= List of flag bearers for Israel at the Olympics =

Israel at the Olympics
- IOC code: ISR
- NOC: Olympic Committee of Israel
- Website: www.olympic.one.co.il (in Hebrew and English)
- Medals: Gold 4 Silver 6 Bronze 10 Total 20

Summer appearances
- 1952; 1956; 1960; 1964; 1968; 1972; 1976; 1980; 1984; 1988; 1992; 1996; 2000; 2004; 2008; 2012; 2016; 2020; 2024

Winter appearances
- 1994; 1998; 2002; 2006; 2010; 2014; 2018; 2022; 2026

This is a list of flag bearers who have represented Israel at the Olympics.

Flag bearers carry the national flag of their country at the opening and closing ceremonies of the Olympic Games.

#	Event year	Season	Opening flag bearer	Sport	Closing flag bearer	Sport
1	1952	Summer	Abraham Shneior	Basketball		
2	1956	Summer	Yoav Ra'anan	Diving		
3	1960	Summer	Gideon Ariel	Athletics		
4	1964	Summer	Gideon Ariel	Athletics		
5	1968	Summer	Gershon Shefa	Swimming		
6	1972	Summer	Henry Herscovici	Shooting		
7	1976	Summer	Esther Roth-Shahamorov	Athletics		
8	1984	Summer	Zehava Shmueli	Athletics		
9	1988	Summer	Itzhak Yonassi	Shooting		
10	1992	Summer	Eldad Amir	Sailing		
11	1994	Winter	Michael Shmerkin	Figure skating		
12	1996	Summer	Lydia Hatuel-Zuckerman	Fencing		
13	1998	Winter	Michael Shmerkin	Figure skating		
14	2000	Summer	Rogel Nachum	Athletics		
15	2002	Winter	Galit Chait	Figure skating		
16	2004	Summer	Ariel Ze'evi	Judo	Gal Fridman	Sailing
17	2006	Winter	Galit Chait	Figure skating	Galit Chait	Figure skating
18	2008	Summer	Michael Kolganov	Canoeing	Shahar Tzuberi	Sailing
19	2010	Winter	Alexandra Zaretsky	Figure skating	Mykhaylo Renzhyn	Alpine skiing
20	2012	Summer	Shahar Tzuberi	Sailing	Neta Rivkin	Gymnastics
21	2014	Winter	Vladislav Bykanov	Short track speed skating	Vladislav Bykanov	Short track speed skating
22	2016	Summer	Neta Rivkin	Gymnastics	Alona Koshevatskiy	Gymnastics
23	2018	Winter	Oleksii Bychenko	Figure skating	Itamar Biran	Alpine skiing
24	2020	Summer	Hanna Knyazyeva-Minenko; Yakov Toumarkin	Athletics; Swimming	Linoy Ashram	Gymnastics
25	2022	Winter	Evgeni Krasnopolski; Noa Szollos	Figure skating Alpine skiing		
26	2024	Summer	Andrea Murez; Peter Paltchik	Swimming; Judo	Romi Paritzki; Tom Reuveny	Gymnastics; Sailing
