= Israel at the 1994 Winter Olympics =

- IOC code: ISR
- NOC: Olympic Committee of Israel
- Website: www.olympicsil.co.il (in Hebrew and English)

in Lillehammer
- Competitors: 1 in 1 sport
- Flag bearer: Michael Shmerkin
- Medals: Gold 0 Silver 0 Bronze 0 Total 0

Winter Olympics appearances (overview)
- 1994; 1998; 2002; 2006; 2010; 2014; 2018; 2022; 2026

Israel competed in the Winter Olympic Games for the first time at the 1994 Winter Olympics in Lillehammer, Norway.

The lone Israeli competitor was Michael Shmerkin in men's figure skating.

== Competitors ==
The following is the list of number of competitors in the Games.

Sport	Men	Women	Total
Figure skating	1	0	1
Total	1	0	1

== Results by event ==
=== Figure skating ===
Gender	Athlete	Final				
Gender	Athlete	Short Program	Rank	Free Skating	Total	Rank
Men's	Michael Shmerkin	7.5	15	17.0	24.5	16
