= Israel at the 1998 Winter Olympics =

- IOC code: ISR
- NOC: Olympic Committee of Israel
- Website: www.olympicsil.co.il (in Hebrew and English)

in Nagano
- Competitors: 3 in 1 sport
- Flag bearer: Michael Shmerkin
- Medals: Gold 0 Silver 0 Bronze 0 Total 0

Winter Olympics appearances (overview)
- 1994; 1998; 2002; 2006; 2010; 2014; 2018; 2022; 2026

Israel competed at the 1998 Winter Olympics in Nagano, Japan.

The Israeli delegation included 3 figure skaters. Michael Shmerkin competed in the men's event, Galit Chait and Sergei Sakhnovski competed in ice dancing.

== Competitors ==
The following is the list of number of competitors in the Games.

Sport	Men	Women	Total
Figure skating	2	1	3
Total	2	1	3

== Figure skating ==
Athlete(s)	Event	CD1	CD2	SP/OD	FS/FD	Total	
Athlete(s)	Event	FP	FP	FP	FP	TFP	Rank
Michael Shmerkin	Men's	—N/a		14 Q	18	25.0	18
Galit Chait & Sergei Sakhnovski	Ice dancing	17	14	14	14	28.6	14
