= List of Israeli records in speed skating =

The following are the national records in speed skating in Israel, maintained by Israel Ice Skating Federation.

== Men ==
Event	Record	Athlete	Date	Meet	Place	Ref
500 meters	37.62	Vladislav Bykanov	22 October 2016	Olympic Oval Invitational	Calgary, Canada	
500 meters × 2						
1000 meters	1:11.69	Vladislav Bykanov	22 October 2016	Olympic Oval Invitational	Calgary, Canada	
1500 meters	1.49.91	Vladislav Bykanov	23 October 2016	Olympic Oval Invitational	Calgary, Canada	
3000 meters	3:54.49	Vladislav Bykanov	5 January 2019	Trainingswedstrijd KNSB- en Topteams	Heerenveen, Netherlands	
5000 meters	6:39.99	Vladislav Bykanov	21 October 2016	Olympic Oval Invitational	Calgary, Canada	
10000 meters						
Team pursuit (8 laps)						
Sprint combination						
Small combination						
Big combination						

== Women ==
Event	Record	Athlete	Date	Meet	Place	Ref
500 meters						
500 meters × 2						
1000 meters						
1500 meters						
3000 meters						
5000 meters						
10000 meters						
Team pursuit (6 laps)						
Sprint combination						
Mini combination						
Small combination						
