= Israel at the 2010 Winter Olympics =

- IOC code: ISR
- NOC: Olympic Committee of Israel
- Website: www.olympicsil.co.il (in Hebrew and English)

in Vancouver
- Competitors: 3 in 2 sports
- Flag bearer (opening): Alexandra Zaretsky
- Flag bearer (closing): Mykhaylo Renzhyn
- Medals: Gold 0 Silver 0 Bronze 0 Total 0

Winter Olympics appearances (overview)
- 1994; 1998; 2002; 2006; 2010; 2014; 2018; 2022; 2026

Israel has participated at the 2010 Winter Olympics in Vancouver, British Columbia, Canada, which occurred from February 12–28, 2010. This was the fifth time Israel took part in the Winter Olympics. The Israeli delegation consisted of alpine skier Mykhaylo Renzhyn and ice dancing duo Alexandra Zaretsky and Roman Zaretsky. Tamar Katz qualified, but the Israeli National Olympic Committee (NOC) did not permit her to compete. They did not bring home a medal during these Olympics.

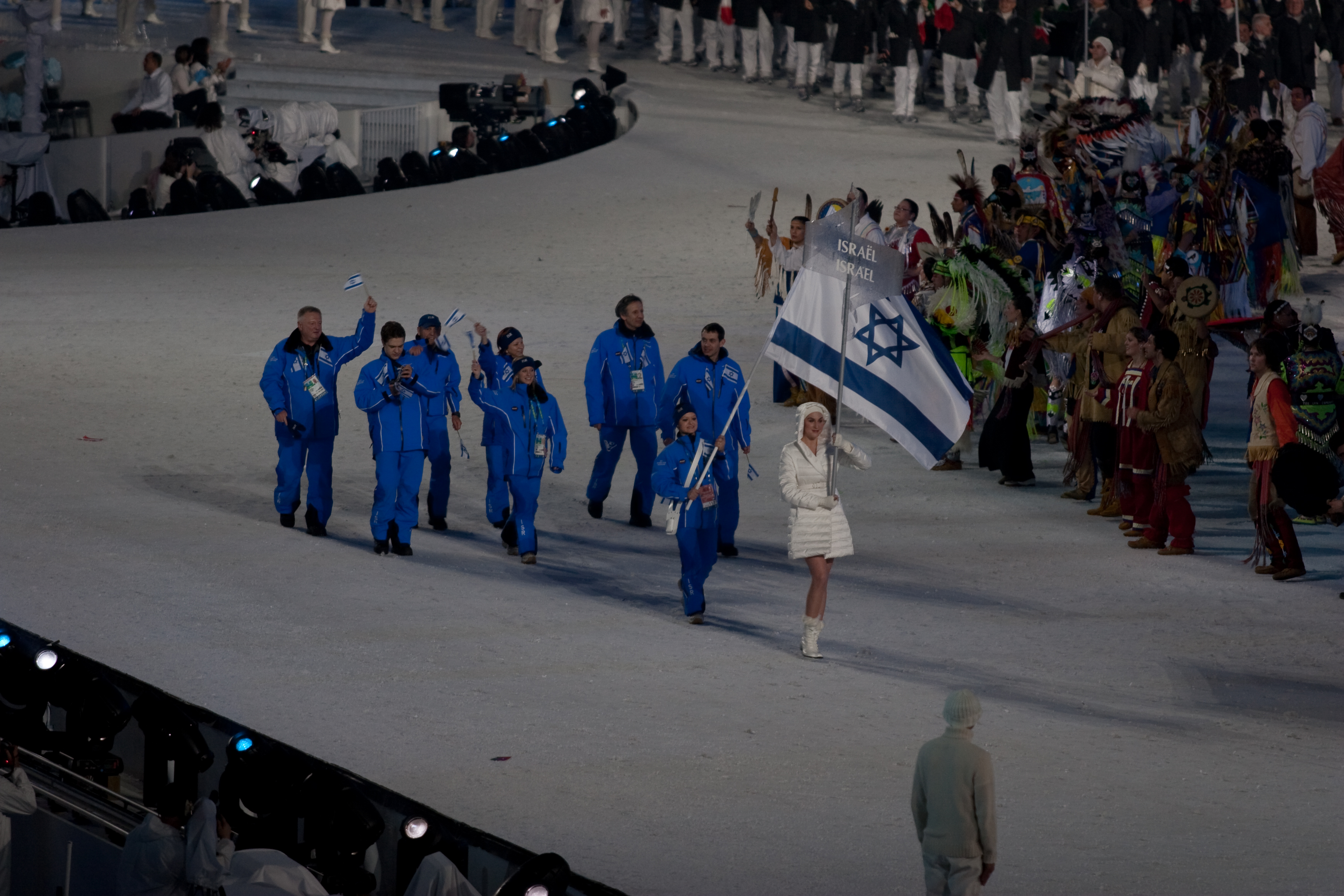
The athletes entering the stadium during the opening ceremonies.

== Background ==
Israel participated in every Winter Olympics since the 1994 Olympics in Norway. The country has never won a Winter Olympics medal.

Three athletes represented Israel in the 2010 Olympics: two in figure skating and one in alpine skiing. Mykhaylo Renzhyn was Israel's first-ever Olympic alpine skiing competitor during the 2006 Winter Games. Brother and sister ice skating duo Alexandra Zaretsky and Roman Zaretsky also competed for Israel at the 2006 Winter Olympics. Alexandra Zaretsky was the flag bearer for the opening ceremonies and Mykhaylo Renzhyn had the honor for the closing ceremonies.

== Alpine skiing ==
Mykhaylo Renzhyn was the lone Israeli alpiner skier. He competed in the men's giant slalom and men's slalom events. He trains in the United States. Renzhyn competed in the men's giant slalom event on February 23, originally scheduled for the 21st. He finished in 55th place, out of 81 competitors that posted a time. He finished the first run in 1:25.77 and the second in 1:28.04, for a total of 2:53.81. He was 15.98 seconds behind the leader. In the slalom event, Renzhyn finished 35th of 48 athletes that completed the event. He posted a time of 52.84 in his first run, and 56.07 in the second. He finished the event 9.59 seconds behind the leader.

Athlete	Event	Run 1	Run 2	Total	Rank
Mykhaylo Renzhyn	Men's giant slalom	1:25.77	1:28.04	2:53.18	55
Mykhaylo Renzhyn	Men's slalom	52.84	56.07	1:48.91	35

== Ice dancing ==
Israel qualified one entrant in ladies singles and two in ice dancing, for a total of three athletes. However, the Olympic Committee of Israel decided on January 24, 2010, to send only Alexandra Zaretsky and Roman Zaretsky in the ice dancing event, and not send Tamar Katz for the ladies event, because she failed to reach the criteria set by Israel NOC. The Israeli NOC said during an interview that they set targets for their athletes ahead of time, and Katz was required to finish in the top 14 at the European Championships (she finished 21st). The Secretary General went on to say that while some countries' goal is to compete, Israel's goal is to win.

The Zaretsky duo was coached by their mother in Israel. They did not get much ice time, and the arena was bombed multiple times. They later moved to the United States and were coached by Galit Chait. They competed in the 2006 Winter Olympics, where they only had two weeks notice but finished 22nd. The competition started with the compulsory dance, and the pair danced to "Tango Romantica", as the rest of the competitors did. The romantic music can be awkward for sibling pairs, but the Zaretskys say they act to get through it. They performed to "Hava Negillah" for the original dance and "Schindler's List" for the free dance. They performed music from Schindler's List for remembrance of the Holocaust, and to pay tribute to their family's history. "Hava Negillah" is more upbeat, and they hoped to have the audience clap along and get involved. They placed tenth in each dance category, and finished tenth overall.

Athlete(s)	Event	CD		OD		FD		Total	
Athlete(s)	Event	Points	Rank	Points	Rank	Points	Rank	Points	Rank
Alexandra Zaretsky / Roman Zaretsky	Ice dancing	34.38	10	55.24	10	90.64	10	180.26	10
