= Israel at the 2018 Winter Olympics =

- Flag of Israel
- IOC code: ISR
- NOC: Olympic Committee of Israel
- Website: www.olympicsil.co.il (in Hebrew and English)

in Pyeongchang, South Korea 9–25 February 2018
- Competitors: 10 (7 men and 3 women) in 4 sports and 10 events
- Flag bearer (opening): Oleksii Bychenko
- Flag bearer (closing): Itamar Biran
- Medals: Gold 0 Silver 0 Bronze 0 Total 0

Winter Olympics appearances (overview)
- 1994; 1998; 2002; 2006; 2010; 2014; 2018; 2022; 2026

Israel competed at the 2018 Winter Olympics in Pyeongchang, South Korea, from 9 to 25 February 2018, with ten competitors in four sports.

== Competitors ==
The following is a list of the number of Israeli competitors participating at the Games per sport/discipline.

Sport	Men	Women	Total
Alpine skiing	1	0	1
Figure skating	4	3	7
Short track speed skating	1	0	1
Skeleton	1	0	1
Total	7	3	10

== Alpine skiing ==
Israel qualified one male alpine skier.

Athlete	Event	Run 1		Run 2		Total	
Athlete	Event	Time	Rank	Time	Rank	Time	Rank
Itamar Biran	Men's giant slalom	1:17.52	58	1:16.19	45	2:33.71	49
Itamar Biran	Men's slalom	DNF					

== Figure skating ==
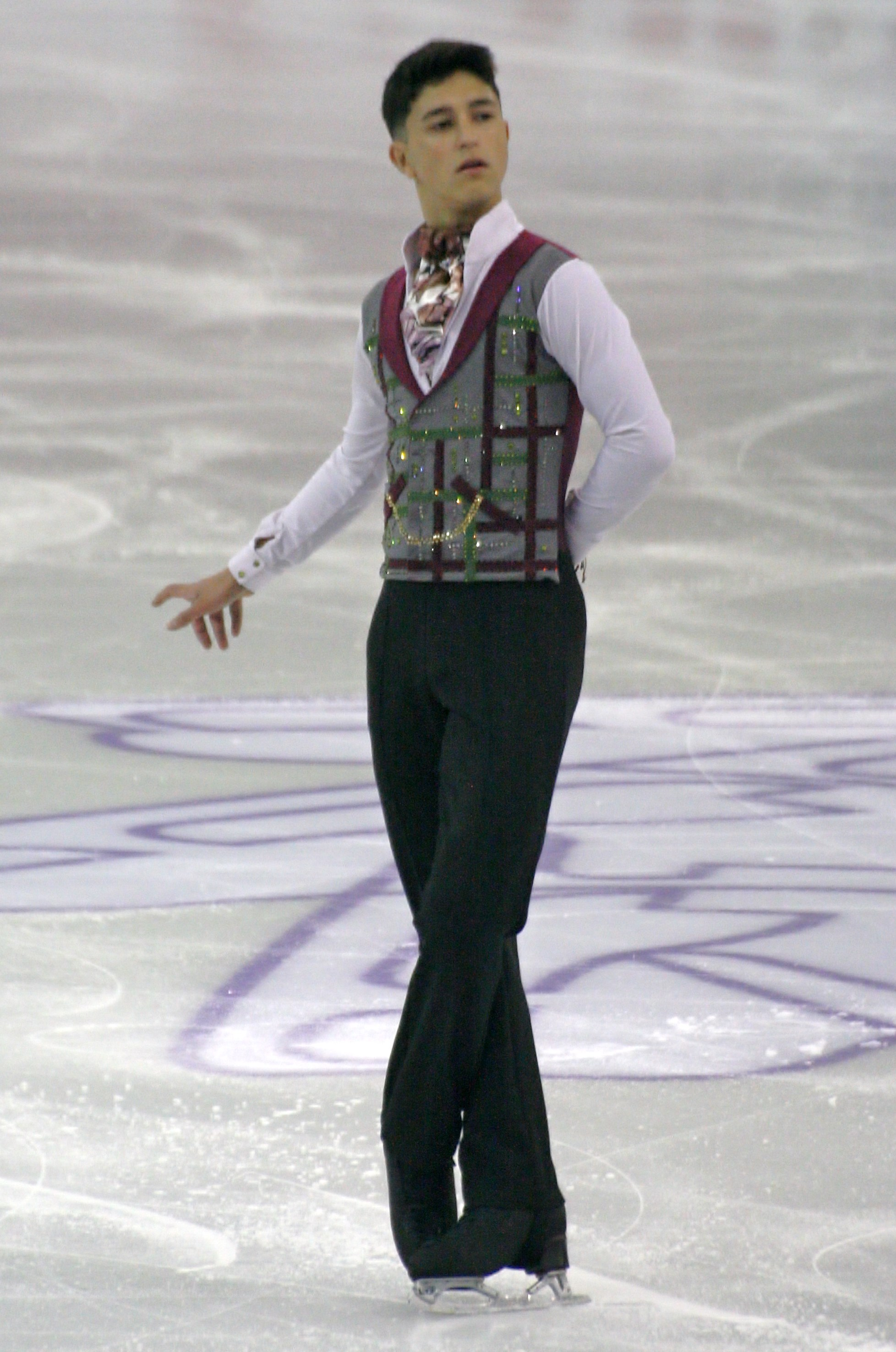
Daniel Samohin

In the 2017 World Figure Skating Championships in Helsinki, Finland, Oleksii Bychenko finished in 10th place with 245.96 points, and earned two quota places for the Israeli delegation in the men's event. Isabella Tobias and Ilia Tkachenko finished in 12th place with 162.67 points, and earned one quota place in the ice dancing event.

In the 2017 CS Nebelhorn Trophy in Oberstdorf, Germany, Evgeni Krasnopolski and Paige Conners finished in 8th place with 171.61 points and earned one quota place in the Pairs event.

Bychenko and Daniel Samohin competed in the Men's singles event. Krasnopolski and Conners competed in the Pairs event. In Ice Dancing, Ronald Zilberberg and Adel Tankova represented Israel after Tkachenko's requests for Israeli citizenship was denied. Aimee Buchanan participated in the Team event in the Ladies contest, after Israel ranked among the top ten countries.

Singles

Athlete	Event	SP/SD		FS/FD		Total	
Athlete	Event	Points	Rank	Points	Rank	Points	Rank
Oleksii Bychenko	Men's singles	84.13	13 Q	172.88	9	257.01	11
Daniel Samohin	Men's singles	80.69	18 Q	170.75	11	251.44	13
Paige Conners / Evgeni Krasnopolski	Pairs	60.35	19	did not advance			
Adel Tankova / Ronald Zilberberg	Ice dancing	46.66	24	did not advance			

Team event

Athlete	Event	Short program/Short dance						Free skate/Free dance					
Athlete	Event	Men's	Ladies'	Pairs	Ice dance	Total	Rank	Men's	Ladies'	Pairs	Ice dance	Total	Rank
Athlete	Event	Points Team points	Points Team points	Points Team points	Points Team points	Total	Rank	Points Team points	Points Team points	Points Team points	Points Team points	Total	Rank
Oleksii Bychenko (M); Aimee Buchanan (L); Paige Conners / Evgeni Krasnopolski (P); Adel Tankova / Ronald Zilberberg (ID)	Team event	88.49; 9	46.30; 1	54.47; 2	44.61; 1	13	8	Did not advance					

== Short track speed skating ==
Israel won a quota after Vladislav Bykanov participated at 2017–18 ISU Short Track Speed Skating World Cup Competitions.

Athlete	Event	Heat		Quarterfinal		Semifinal		Final	
Athlete	Event	Time	Rank	Time	Rank	Time	Rank	Time	Rank
Vladislav Bykanov	Men's 500 m	47.177	4	Did not advance					26
Vladislav Bykanov	Men's 1000 m	PEN		Did not advance					
Vladislav Bykanov	Men's 1500 m	PEN		—N/a		Did not advance			

Qualification legend: ADV – Advanced due to being impeded by another skater; FA – Qualify to medal round; FB – Qualify to consolation round; AA – Advance to medal round due to being impeded by another skater

== Skeleton ==
Adam Edelman earned a spot for Israel through reallocation.

Athlete	Event	Run 1		Run 2		Run 3		Run 4		Total	
Athlete	Event	Time	Rank	Time	Rank	Time	Rank	Time	Rank	Time	Rank
Adam Edelman	Men's	52.48	28	52.43	28	52.35	28	Eliminated		2:37.26	28
