= Figure skating at the 2002 Winter Olympics – Ice dance =

Ice dance at the XIX Olympic Winter Games
- Venue: Salt Lake Ice Center; Salt Lake City, Utah, United States
- Dates: February 15–18, 2002
- Competitors: 24 teams from 17 nations

Medalists
1st place, gold medalist(s)		Marina Anissina and Gwendal Peizerat	France
2nd place, silver medalist(s)		Irina Lobacheva and Ilia Averbukh	Russia
3rd place, bronze medalist(s)		Barbara Fusar-Poli and Maurizio Margaglio	Italy

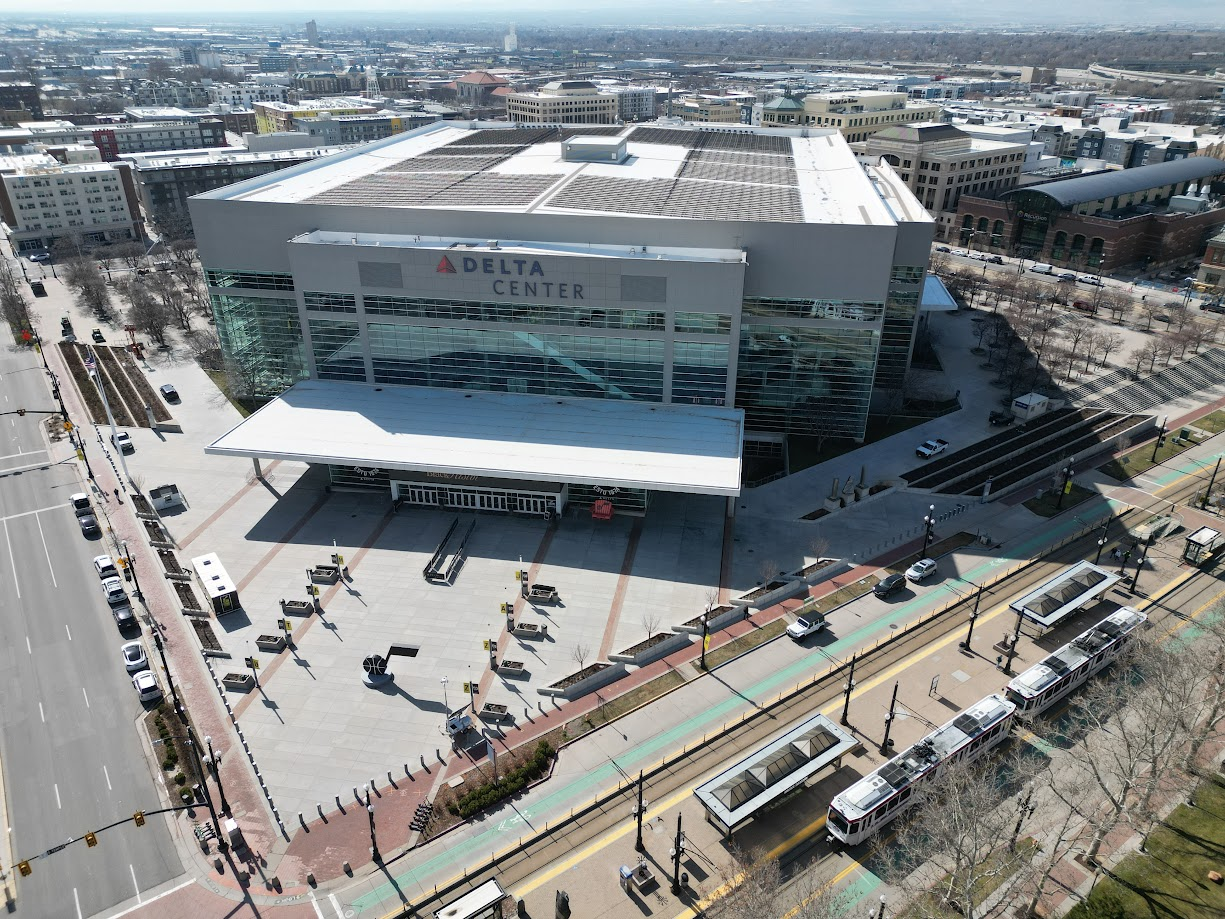
The figure skating events at the 2002 Winter Olympics were held at the Salt Lake Ice Center in Salt Lake City, Utah.

The ice dance competition at the 2002 Winter Olympics was held at the Salt Lake Ice Center in Salt Lake City, Utah, in the United States, between February 15 and 18, 2002, and featured 24 teams from 17 different nations. Marina Anissina and Gwendal Peizerat of France won the gold medals, while Irina Lobacheva and Ilia Averbukh of Russia won the silver, and Barbara Fusar-Poli and Maurizio Margaglio of Italy won the bronze. This marked the first Olympic gold medal for France in figure skating since 1932. Additionally, Fusar-Poli and Margaglio's bronze medals were the first Olympic medals in figure skating for Italy.

This event took place in the wake of the judging scandal in the pairs event, in which the French judge had been implicated in colluding to award the Russian team the gold in the pairs event in exchange for the French team winning the ice dance event. In response to the scandal, the International Skating Union voted in 2004 to abolish the 6.0 judging system. Instead, the ISU Judging System was created, whereby skaters and teams were scored based on a technical grade of execution of their required elements.

== Background ==
The ice dance event was one of four figure skating competitions contested at the 2002 Winter Olympics in Salt Lake City, Utah, in the United States. It was held at the Salt Lake Ice Center over three nights: the compulsory dance took place on February 15, the original dance on February 17, and the free dance on February 18. The competition featured 24 teams representing 17 nations. The couples expected to dominate the competition were Marina Anissina and Gwendal Peizerat of France; Barbara Fusar-Poli and Maurizio Margaglio of Italy; Shae-Lynn Bourne and Victor Kraatz of Canada; and Irina Lobacheva and Ilia Averbukh of Russia. Anissina and Peizerat were the bronze medalists at the 1998 Winter Olympics and the 2000 World Champions, while Fusar-Poli and Margaglio were the 2001 World Champions. Bourne and Kraatz had recently won the 2001 Grand Prix of Figure Skating Final, and while Lobacheva and Averbukh had missed most of the season due to injury, they did win the bronze medals at the 2002 European Figure Skating Championships.

On February 11, Elena Berezhnaya and Anton Sikharulidze of Russia were awarded the gold medals in the pairs event, while Jamie Salé and David Pelletier of Canada were awarded the silver. Reports began circulating in the media almost immediately that the results of the event had been predetermined as part of a deal regarding the ice dance competition. In response to the outcry, Ottavio Cinquanta, president of the International Skating Union (ISU), announced that the ISU would conduct an review of the judging of the pairs event. Cinquanta acknowledged that Ronald Pfenning, the event referee, had alleged that in a meeting with the judges, French judge Marie-Reine Le Gougne had admitted to having been pressured by Didier Gailhaguet, president of the French Federation of Ice Sports, to award the gold to the Russian team. An arrangement had allegedly been struck whereby Le Gougne was to award the gold to the Russian pairs team, while the Russian ice dance judge was to award the gold to the French ice dance team. On February 15, Jacques Rogge, president of the International Olympic Committee (IOC) announced that Salé and Pelletier would also be awarded gold medals, while Berezhnaya and Sikharulidze would be allowed to keep theirs. The medal award ceremony was repeated prior to the original dance on February 17.

Judging in Olympic ice dance had long been mired in scandal. There was usually very little movement between teams' placements from one night of competition to the next. Due to the lack of identifiable elements like jumps or spins, spectators often had difficulty recognizing what was being judged. At the 1992 Winter Olympics, accusations of judging irregularities abounded, with one judge quoted as saying that the results had been determined months earlier. After the 1998 Winter Olympics, Shae-Lynn Bourne and Victor Kraatz alleged that the French and Russian judges had conspired to rig the outcome. Canadian judge Jean Senft later released taped recordings of Ukrainian judge Yuri Balkov that seemed to indicate collusion among at least three judges, with the placements of the top teams determined weeks before the Olympics began. Balkov and Senft were both suspended by the ISU as a result. A photographer from Italy also took a picture of one judge dozing off during the ice dance competition. In December 2001, Richard Pound, former vice president of the IOC, stated in an interview that that IOC had given consideration to dropping ice dance as an Olympic event due to the poor public image the event created with its perceived judging malfeasance. Instead, the IOC ordered the ISU to rein in their judging, to which the ISU responded with a spate of new rules. Due to the heightened scrutiny brought about by the pairs controversy, Mike Penner of the Los Angeles Times wrote that the ice dance judges would have to "wait until after the dancers actually step onto the ice before pushing buttons".

== Qualification ==
Twenty-four teams were eligible to compete in the ice dance event at the 2002 Winter Olympics. Nineteen quota spots were awarded based on the results of the 2001 World Figure Skating Championships. Lithuania had originally qualified two quota spots after the World Championships; however, the Lithuanian Skating Federation returned one spot when they chose to send only one team to the Olympics. That extra spot was also made available at the 2001 Golden Spin of Zagreb along with the five quota spots already allocated. Germany had also originally qualified two quota spots after the World Championships, but ultimately only sent one team to the Olympics.

Great Britain qualified one spot after Marika Humphreys and Vitaliy Baranov finished in third place at the Golden Spin of Zagreb. However, the British Olympic Association (BOA) had previously decreed that they would need to finish either first or second in Zagreb to qualify for the 2002 Olympics. After British Ice Skating filed an appeal with the BOA, they relented and finally granted Humphreys and Baranov clearance to compete.

Qualifying nations in ice dance
Event	Teams per NOC	Qualifying NOCs	Total teams
2001 World Championships	2	Italy; France; Russia; Canada; ~~Lithuania~~; Israel; ~~Germany~~; Ukraine; United States	17
2001 World Championships	1	Bulgaria; Lithuania; Germany	17
2001 Golden Spin of Zagreb	1	Poland; Switzerland; Great Britain; Czech Republic; Azerbaijan; China; South Korea	7
Total			24

== Competition ==
The ice dance competition at the 2002 Winter Olympics consisted of three segments: the compulsory dance, the original dance, and the free dance. Teams were assigned two compulsory patterns: the quickstep and the blues. Teams performed the compulsory dances on February 15. All teams performed the same patterns to the same music. The compulsory dances were worth twenty percent of the final score.

Teams performed their original dances on February 17. The theme of the original dance was a Spanish medley and couples were required to use at least two of the following rhythms: the tango, flamenco, paso doble, or a Spanish-style waltz. Lasting 2 minutes 30 seconds (+/− 10 seconds), the original dance had to include the following elements: two dance lifts, one dance spin, one diagonal step sequence, and one midline step sequence while not in hold. The midline step sequence had to include one set of sequential twizzles. The original dance was worth thirty percent of the final score.

Teams performed their free dances on February 18. the free dance had to include the following elements: between five to seven dance lifts, of which one had to be a rotational lift and one a non-rotational lift; between two to three dance spins; two sets of synchronized twizzles; one circular step sequence; and either one diagonal or one straight line step sequence. The free dance was worth fifty percent of the final score. While music with lyrics had been permitted for original dances during the 1998 Winter Olympics, the 2002 Winter Olympics were the first to allow vocal music for the free dances as well.

== Results ==
Teams received two scores from each judge on a scale from 0 to 6.0: the first for technical merit (TM) and the second for presentation (PR). In Culture on Ice, Ellyn Kestnbaum likened the first score to "how difficult the program was" and the second score to "how well it was performed". Criteria for evaluating the technical merit included the difficulty and quality of the elements, its easiness, sureness, skating quality, and an even distribution of elements in the program. Criteria for evaluating the presentation included the harmoniousness of the program, a full utilization of the ice surface, movements and sureness in time to the music, a variation in speed, carriage, style, originality, and expression. Teams were also ranked by each judge on an ordinal scale from 1 to 24.

=== Compulsory dances ===
Teams performed two compulsory dances each on February 15, 2002. The first was the quickstep and the second was the blues. Marina Anissina and Gwendal Peizerat of France finished in first place after both dances, while Irina Lobacheva and Ilia Averbukh of Russia finished in second, Barbara Fusar-Poli and Maurizio Margaglio of Italy finished in third, and Shae-Lynn Bourne and Victor Kraatz of Canada finished in fourth.

Compulsory dance results (Quickstep)
Pl.	Team	Nation	Pts.	Judges' scores and placements									
Pl.	Team	Nation	Pts.		(Lithuania)	(Azerbaijan)	(Ukraine)	(Germany)	(Bulgaria)	(Russia)	(Switzerland)	(Israel)	(Poland)
1	Marina Anissina; Gwendal Peizerat	France	0.2	TM	5.8	5.6	5.7	5.6	5.7	5.7	5.7	5.7	5.6
1	Marina Anissina; Gwendal Peizerat	France	0.2	PR	5.8	5.8	5.8	5.8	5.8	5.8	5.8	5.9	5.8
1	Marina Anissina; Gwendal Peizerat	France	0.2	Pl.	1	1	1	2	1	1	1	1	1
2	Irina Lobacheva; Ilia Averbukh	Russia	0.4	TM	5.6	5.4	5.6	5.6	5.6	5.6	5.5	5.6	5.5
2	Irina Lobacheva; Ilia Averbukh	Russia	0.4	PR	5.8	5.7	5.7	5.7	5.7	5.7	5.6	5.7	5.6
2	Irina Lobacheva; Ilia Averbukh	Russia	0.4	Pl.	2	2	2	3	2	2	2	3	4
3	Barbara Fusar-Poli; Maurizio Margaglio	Italy	0.6	TM	5.4	5.4	5.6	5.7	5.4	5.5	5.5	5.7	5.6
3	Barbara Fusar-Poli; Maurizio Margaglio	Italy	0.6	PR	5.7	5.6	5.6	5.8	5.6	5.8	5.4	5.8	5.7
3	Barbara Fusar-Poli; Maurizio Margaglio	Italy	0.6	Pl.	4	4	3	1	3	3	3	2	2
4	Shae-Lynn Bourne; Victor Kraatz	Canada	0.8	TM	5.4	5.5	5.5	5.5	5.3	5.5	5.4	5.5	5.5
4	Shae-Lynn Bourne; Victor Kraatz	Canada	0.8	PR	5.6	5.5	5.7	5.8	5.6	5.5	5.5	5.8	5.7
4	Shae-Lynn Bourne; Victor Kraatz	Canada	0.8	Pl.	5	3	4	4	4	5	4	4	3
5	Margarita Drobiazko; Povilas Vanagas	Lithuania	1.0	TM	5.5	5.2	5.3	5.4	5.3	5.4	5.4	5.3	5.4
5	Margarita Drobiazko; Povilas Vanagas	Lithuania	1.0	PR	5.6	5.5	5.6	5.6	5.5	5.7	5.3	5.6	5.6
5	Margarita Drobiazko; Povilas Vanagas	Lithuania	1.0	Pl.	3	6	6	5	5	4	6	6	5
6	Galit Chait; Sergei Sakhnovski	Israel	1.2	TM	5.2	5.3	5.4	5.2	5.3	5.4	5.2	5.4	5.3
6	Galit Chait; Sergei Sakhnovski	Israel	1.2	PR	5.4	5.5	5.6	5.6	5.4	5.6	5.3	5.6	5.5
6	Galit Chait; Sergei Sakhnovski	Israel	1.2	Pl.	8	5	5	8	6	6	9	5	7
7	Albena Denkova; Maxim Staviski	Bulgaria	1.4	TM	5.3	5.0	5.3	5.2	5.2	5.4	5.3	5.3	5.4
7	Albena Denkova; Maxim Staviski	Bulgaria	1.4	PR	5.5	5.1	5.3	5.2	5.5	5.5	5.4	5.4	5.4
7	Albena Denkova; Maxim Staviski	Bulgaria	1.4	Pl.	6	10	8	10	7	7	7	7	6
8	Kati Winkler; René Lohse	Germany	1.6	TM	5.3	5.2	5.2	5.3	5.3	5.3	5.2	5.2	5.3
8	Kati Winkler; René Lohse	Germany	1.6	PR	5.4	5.4	5.2	5.5	5.3	5.5	5.2	5.4	5.4
8	Kati Winkler; René Lohse	Germany	1.6	Pl.	7	7	9	7	8	10	10	8	8
9	Tatiana Navka; Roman Kostomarov	Russia	1.8	TM	5.2	5.0	5.1	5.3	5.0	5.4	5.4	5.1	5.1
9	Tatiana Navka; Roman Kostomarov	Russia	1.8	PR	5.2	5.2	5.2	5.4	5.2	5.4	5.4	5.3	5.2
9	Tatiana Navka; Roman Kostomarov	Russia	1.8	Pl.	10	9	10	9	9	9	5	10	10
10	Elena Grushina; Ruslan Honcharov	Ukraine	2.0	TM	5.0	5.2	5.3	5.1	5.0	5.3	5.1	5.2	4.9
10	Elena Grushina; Ruslan Honcharov	Ukraine	2.0	PR	5.1	5.3	5.4	5.1	5.1	5.6	5.0	5.3	4.8
10	Elena Grushina; Ruslan Honcharov	Ukraine	2.0	Pl.	13	8	7	12	10	8	11	9	13
11	Marie-France Dubreuil; Patrice Lauzon	Canada	2.2	TM	5.1	4.9	5.0	5.4	4.9	5.1	4.7	5.1	5.2
11	Marie-France Dubreuil; Patrice Lauzon	Canada	2.2	PR	5.2	5.1	5.1	5.5	5.2	5.3	4.9	5.2	5.5
11	Marie-France Dubreuil; Patrice Lauzon	Canada	2.2	Pl.	11	11	12	6	11	11	15	11	9
12	Naomi Lang; Peter Tchernyshev	United States	2.4	TM	5.1	4.8	5.0	5.2	4.8	5.1	5.0	5.1	5.2
12	Naomi Lang; Peter Tchernyshev	United States	2.4	PR	5.4	5.2	5.2	5.1	5.1	4.9	4.8	5.0	5.0
12	Naomi Lang; Peter Tchernyshev	United States	2.4	Pl.	9	12	11	11	12	15	13	12	11
13	Sylwia Nowak; Sebastian Kolasiński	Poland	2.6	TM	5.0	4.7	5.0	5.1	4.9	5.0	4.8	4.7	4.8
13	Sylwia Nowak; Sebastian Kolasiński	Poland	2.6	PR	5.2	4.8	5.0	5.0	4.9	5.1	5.0	4.9	5.0
13	Sylwia Nowak; Sebastian Kolasiński	Poland	2.6	Pl.	12	15	13	13	13	14	14	14	12
14	Isabelle Delobel; Olivier Schoenfelder	France	2.8	TM	4.9	4.8	4.9	5.0	4.8	5.0	5.3	4.8	4.7
14	Isabelle Delobel; Olivier Schoenfelder	France	2.8	PR	5.0	5.1	5.0	5.0	5.0	5.2	5.3	4.9	4.9
14	Isabelle Delobel; Olivier Schoenfelder	France	2.8	Pl.	15	13	15	14	14	13	8	13	14
15	Eliane Hugentobler; Daniel Hugentobler	Switzerland	3.0	TM	5.0	4.8	4.9	4.6	4.8	5.1	4.9	4.7	4.8
15	Eliane Hugentobler; Daniel Hugentobler	Switzerland	3.0	PR	5.0	5.0	5.1	4.8	4.8	5.1	5.0	4.8	4.7
15	Eliane Hugentobler; Daniel Hugentobler	Switzerland	3.0	Pl.	14	14	14	15	16	12	12	15	15
16	Marika Humphreys; Vitali Baranov	Great Britain	3.2	TM	4.8	4.4	4.8	4.2	4.6	4.7	4.5	4.5	4.4
16	Marika Humphreys; Vitali Baranov	Great Britain	3.2	PR	5.0	4.9	5.0	4.5	4.9	5.0	4.5	4.8	4.7
16	Marika Humphreys; Vitali Baranov	Great Britain	3.2	Pl.	16	16	16	18	17	16	16	16	16
17	Kristin Fraser; Igor Lukanin	Azerbaijan	3.4	TM	4.6	4.5	4.7	4.2	4.2	4.5	4.1	4.4	4.1
17	Kristin Fraser; Igor Lukanin	Azerbaijan	3.4	PR	4.8	4.7	4.9	4.6	4.4	4.6	4.3	4.5	4.5
17	Kristin Fraser; Igor Lukanin	Azerbaijan	3.4	Pl.	18	17	17	17	19	18	20	18	21
18	Federica Faiella; Massimo Scali	Italy	3.6	TM	4.5	4.4	4.6	4.1	4.4	4.5	4.3	4.4	4.3
18	Federica Faiella; Massimo Scali	Italy	3.6	PR	4.7	4.8	4.8	4.3	4.6	4.7	4.3	4.4	4.7
18	Federica Faiella; Massimo Scali	Italy	3.6	Pl.	20	18	18	19	18	17	18	19	18
19	Natalia Gudina; Alexei Beletski	Israel	3.8	TM	4.6	4.3	4.0	4.3	4.0	4.4	4.2	4.4	4.4
19	Natalia Gudina; Alexei Beletski	Israel	3.8	PR	4.7	4.5	4.3	4.6	4.2	4.6	4.4	4.7	4.6
19	Natalia Gudina; Alexei Beletski	Israel	3.8	Pl.	19	19	21	16	20	19	19	17	17
20	Beata Handra; Charles Sinek	United States	4.0	TM	4.6	4.0	4.3	4.0	4.8	4.3	4.0	4.2	4.4
20	Beata Handra; Charles Sinek	United States	4.0	PR	4.9	4.5	4.7	4.3	4.9	4.6	4.0	4.5	4.3
20	Beata Handra; Charles Sinek	United States	4.0	Pl.	17	21	19	21	15	20	21	20	19
21	Kateřina Kovalová; David Szurman	Czech Republic	4.2	TM	4.1	4.2	3.8	4.0	3.8	4.0	3.9	4.0	4.2
21	Kateřina Kovalová; David Szurman	Czech Republic	4.2	PR	4.3	4.4	4.2	4.4	4.2	4.3	4.1	4.2	4.5
21	Kateřina Kovalová; David Szurman	Czech Republic	4.2	Pl.	21	20	22	20	22	22	22	22	20
22	Julia Golovina; Oleg Voyko	Ukraine	4.4	TM	4.1	4.0	4.1	3.9	3.7	4.2	4.3	4.1	3.8
22	Julia Golovina; Oleg Voyko	Ukraine	4.4	PR	4.2	4.4	4.3	4.4	4.0	4.4	4.4	4.2	4.2
22	Julia Golovina; Oleg Voyko	Ukraine	4.4	Pl.	22	22	20	22	23	21	17	21	24
23	Zhang Weina; Cao Xianming	China	4.6	TM	4.0	4.0	3.6	4.0	3.9	4.0	3.9	4.0	4.1
23	Zhang Weina; Cao Xianming	China	4.6	PR	4.3	4.2	4.0	4.0	4.1	4.2	3.8	4.1	4.3
23	Zhang Weina; Cao Xianming	China	4.6	Pl.	23	24	24	23	21	23	23	23	22
24	Yang Tae-hwa; Lee Chuen-gun	South Korea	4.8	TM	3.9	4.0	3.7	3.9	3.6	3.9	.8	3.8	4.1
24	Yang Tae-hwa; Lee Chuen-gun	South Korea	4.8	PR	4.1	4.3	4.1	4.1	3.9	4.1	3.8	4.0	4.2
24	Yang Tae-hwa; Lee Chuen-gun	South Korea	4.8	Pl.	24	23	23	24	24	24	24	24	23

Compulsory dance results (Blues)
Pl.	Team	Nation	Pts.	Judges' scores and placements									
Pl.	Team	Nation	Pts.		(Russia)	(Ukraine)	(Italy)	(Israel)	(Bulgaria)	(Azerbaijan)	(Poland)	(Switzerland)	(Germany)
1	Marina Anissina; Gwendal Peizerat	France	0.2	TM	5.7	5.8	5.6	5.7	5.8	5.8	5.7	5.8	5.7
1	Marina Anissina; Gwendal Peizerat	France	0.2	PR	5.8	5.8	5.9	5.9	5.8	5.9	5.8	5.8	5.8
1	Marina Anissina; Gwendal Peizerat	France	0.2	Pl.	1	1	2	1	1	1	1	1	1
2	Irina Lobacheva; Ilia Averbukh	Russia	0.4	TM	5.6	5.7	5.5	5.6	5.7	5.6	5.6	5.6	5.7
2	Irina Lobacheva; Ilia Averbukh	Russia	0.4	PR	5.8	5.7	5.7	5.6	5.7	5.8	5.6	5.7	5.6
2	Irina Lobacheva; Ilia Averbukh	Russia	0.4	Pl.	2	3	4	3	2	2	3	2	3
3	Barbara Fusar-Poli; Maurizio Margaglio	Italy	0.6	TM	5.6	5.7	5.7	5.6	5.6	5.4	5.6	5.5	5.6
3	Barbara Fusar-Poli; Maurizio Margaglio	Italy	0.6	PR	5.7	5.8	5.9	5.8	5.7	5.7	5.7	5.5	5.7
3	Barbara Fusar-Poli; Maurizio Margaglio	Italy	0.6	Pl.	3	2	1	2	3	3	2	3	4
4	Shae-Lynn Bourne; Victor Kraatz	Canada	0.8	TM	5.5	5.6	5.5	5.5	5.6	5.3	5.4	5.3	5.6
4	Shae-Lynn Bourne; Victor Kraatz	Canada	0.8	PR	5.7	5.8	5.8	5.7	5.6	5.7	5.7	5.5	5.8
4	Shae-Lynn Bourne; Victor Kraatz	Canada	0.8	Pl.	4	4	3	4	4	4	4	5	2
5	Margarita Drobiazko; Povilas Vanagas	Lithuania	1.0	TM	5.5	5.4	5.4	5.4	5.4	5.3	5.5	5.4	5.6
5	Margarita Drobiazko; Povilas Vanagas	Lithuania	1.0	PR	5.6	5.5	5.5	5.5	5.6	5.5	5.5	5.4	5.6
5	Margarita Drobiazko; Povilas Vanagas	Lithuania	1.0	Pl.	5	6	6	6	5	5	5	4	5
6	Galit Chait; Sergei Sakhnovski	Israel	1.2	TM	5.4	5.4	5.4	5.4	5.2	5.2	5.1	5.3	5.4
6	Galit Chait; Sergei Sakhnovski	Israel	1.2	PR	5.6	5.6	5.6	5.6	5.5	5.4	5.5	5.4	5.5
6	Galit Chait; Sergei Sakhnovski	Israel	1.2	Pl.	6	5	5	5	7	6	11	6	6
7	Albena Denkova; Maxim Staviski	Bulgaria	1.4	TM	5.3	5.2	5.3	5.3	5.3	5.0	5.4	5.3	5.1
7	Albena Denkova; Maxim Staviski	Bulgaria	1.4	PR	5.5	5.4	5.4	5.4	5.5	5.4	5.5	5.2	5.3
7	Albena Denkova; Maxim Staviski	Bulgaria	1.4	Pl.	7	8	7	8	6	8	6	7	9
8	Kati Winkler; René Lohse	Germany	1.6	TM	5.2	5.2	5.2	5.3	5.3	5.2	5.4	5.3	5.3
8	Kati Winkler; René Lohse	Germany	1.6	PR	5.6	5.3	5.5	5.5	5.3	5.3	5.4	5.1	5.4
8	Kati Winkler; René Lohse	Germany	1.6	Pl.	8	9	8	7	8	7	7	9	7
9	Tatiana Navka; Roman Kostomarov	Russia	1.8	TM	5.3	5.1	5.1	5.1	5.2	5.0	5.2	5.2	5.2
9	Tatiana Navka; Roman Kostomarov	Russia	1.8	PR	5.4	5.3	5.3	5.4	5.3	5.1	5.4	5.3	5.3
9	Tatiana Navka; Roman Kostomarov	Russia	1.8	Pl.	9	10	10	10	9	10	10	8	8
10	Elena Grushina; Ruslan Honcharov	Ukraine	2.0	TM	5.2	5.3	5.0	5.2	5.1	5.0	5.0	5.2	5.1
10	Elena Grushina; Ruslan Honcharov	Ukraine	2.0	PR	5.4	5.4	5.1	5.3	5.3	5.2	5.2	5.2	5.1
10	Elena Grushina; Ruslan Honcharov	Ukraine	2.0	Pl.	10	7	13	9	10	9	13	10	12
11	Naomi Lang; Peter Tchernyshev	United States	2.2	TM	5.2	5.1	5.1	5.1	5.0	5.0	5.3	5.1	5.1
11	Naomi Lang; Peter Tchernyshev	United States	2.2	PR	5.3	5.1	5.2	5.3	5.2	5.0	5.4	5.3	5.2
11	Naomi Lang; Peter Tchernyshev	United States	2.2	Pl.	11	12	12	11	12	11	8	11	10
12	Marie-France Dubreuil; Patrice Lauzon	Canada	2.4	TM	5.1	5.1	5.2	5.0	5.1	4.7	5.2	5.1	5.0
12	Marie-France Dubreuil; Patrice Lauzon	Canada	2.4	PR	5.3	5.2	5.3	5.3	5.2	5.0	5.5	5.3	5.3
12	Marie-France Dubreuil; Patrice Lauzon	Canada	2.4	Pl.	12	11	9	12	11	12	9	11	11
13	Sylwia Nowak; Sebastian Kolasiński	Poland	2.6	TM	5.1	5.0	5.0	4.8	4.7	4.4	5.1	4.9	5.0
13	Sylwia Nowak; Sebastian Kolasiński	Poland	2.6	PR	5.2	5.1	5.4	4.9	4.8	4.7	5.1	4.8	5.0
13	Sylwia Nowak; Sebastian Kolasiński	Poland	2.6	Pl.	13	13	11	14	13	15	12	13	13
14	Isabelle Delobel; Olivier Schoenfelder	France	2.8	TM	4.7	4.8	4.7	4.7	4.6	4.6	4.6	4.7	4.6
14	Isabelle Delobel; Olivier Schoenfelder	France	2.8	PR	5.0	5.0	49	4.9	4.9	4.9	4.9	4.9	4.9
14	Isabelle Delobel; Olivier Schoenfelder	France	2.8	Pl.	16	14	14	15	14	13	16	14	16
15	Eliane Hugentobler; Daniel Hugentobler	Switzerland	3.0	TM	4.8	4.7	4.6	4.6	4.5	4.4	4.7	4.6	4.6
15	Eliane Hugentobler; Daniel Hugentobler	Switzerland	3.0	PR	5.1	4.9	4.8	4.8	4.8	4.8	4.9	4.8	5.0
15	Eliane Hugentobler; Daniel Hugentobler	Switzerland	3.0	Pl.	14	15	15	16	15	14	14	15	15
16	Marika Humphreys; Vitali Baranov	Great Britain	3.2	TM	4.8	4.8	4.5	4.8	4.5	4.5	4.7	4.5	4.7
16	Marika Humphreys; Vitali Baranov	Great Britain	3.2	PR	5.0	4.7	4.8	5.0	4.7	4.5	4.8	4.6	4.9
16	Marika Humphreys; Vitali Baranov	Great Britain	3.2	Pl.	15	16	16	13	16	16	15	17	14
17	Kristin Fraser; Igor Lukanin	Azerbaijan	3.4	TM	4.6	4.7	4.4	4.5	4.4	4.4	4.3	4.5	4.6
17	Kristin Fraser; Igor Lukanin	Azerbaijan	3.4	PR	4.7	4.8	4.6	4.6	4.5	4.5	4.6	4.7	4.7
17	Kristin Fraser; Igor Lukanin	Azerbaijan	3.4	Pl.	17	17	18	17	17	17	19	16	17
18	Federica Faiella; Massimo Scali	Italy	3.6	TM	4.5	4.6	4.5	4.3	4.3	4.3	4.5	4.2	4.6
18	Federica Faiella; Massimo Scali	Italy	3.6	PR	4.7	4.9	4.7	4.6	4.6	4.5	4.7	4.4	4.6
18	Federica Faiella; Massimo Scali	Italy	3.6	Pl.	18	18	17	19	18	18	17	19	18
19	Natalia Gudina; Alexei Beletski	Israel	3.8	TM	4.4	4.3	4.4	4.4	4.3	4.3	4.2	4.4	4.4
19	Natalia Gudina; Alexei Beletski	Israel	3.8	PR	4.7	4.5	4.5	4.6	4.4	4.4	4.6	4.5	4.7
19	Natalia Gudina; Alexei Beletski	Israel	3.8	Pl.	19	19	20	18	19	19	21	18	19
20	Beata Handra; Charles Sinek	United States	4.0	TM	4.3	4.3	4.4	4.3	4.0	4.2	4.3	4.1	4.3
20	Beata Handra; Charles Sinek	United States	4.0	PR	4.7	4.4	4.6	4.5	4.3	4.4	4.7	4.2	4.6
20	Beata Handra; Charles Sinek	United States	4.0	Pl.	20	20	18	20	21	20	18	21	21
21	Kateřina Kovalová; David Szurman	Czech Republic	4.2	TM	4.1	4.1	4.3	4.0	4.2	4.0	4.3	4.0	4.4
21	Kateřina Kovalová; David Szurman	Czech Republic	4.2	PR	4.2	4.3	4.5	4.2	4.5	4.3	4.5	4.3	4.6
21	Kateřina Kovalová; David Szurman	Czech Republic	4.2	Pl.	22	22	21	22	20	21	20	22	20
22	Julia Golovina; Oleg Voyko	Ukraine	4.4	TM	4.0	4.1	4.1	4.2	3.6	3.9	3.9	4.1	3.5
22	Julia Golovina; Oleg Voyko	Ukraine	4.4	PR	4.4	4.4	4.4	4.1	3.9	4.2	4.3	4.3	4.2
22	Julia Golovina; Oleg Voyko	Ukraine	4.4	Pl.	21	21	22	21	23	22	23	20	24
23	Zhang Weina; Cao Xianming	China	4.6	TM	4.0	4.0	4.0	4.0	4.0	3.9	4.2	4.1	4.1
23	Zhang Weina; Cao Xianming	China	4.6	PR	4.3	4.1	4.3	4.1	4.2	4.1	4.2	4.1	4.3
23	Zhang Weina; Cao Xianming	China	4.6	Pl.	23	24	23	23	22	23	22	23	22
24	Yang Tae-hwa; Lee Chuen-gun	South Korea	4.8	TM	4.0	4.0	3.8	3.8	3.6	3.8	4.0	3.9	4.0
24	Yang Tae-hwa; Lee Chuen-gun	South Korea	4.8	PR	4.2	4.2	4.1	4.1	3.8	4.0	4.1	4.2	4.1
24	Yang Tae-hwa; Lee Chuen-gun	South Korea	4.8	Pl.	24	23	24	24	24	24	24	24	23

=== Original dance ===
Original dance results
Pl.	Team	Nation	Pts.	Judges' scores and placements									
Pl.	Team	Nation	Pts.		(Poland)	(Italy)	(Lithuania)	(Switzerland)	(Azerbaijan)	(Israel)	(Germany)	(Bulgaria)	(Russia)
1	Marina Anissina; Gwendal Peizerat	France	0.6	TM	5.8	5.9	5.8	5.9	5.9	5.8	5.7	5.8	5.9
1	Marina Anissina; Gwendal Peizerat	France	0.6	PR	5.9	5.9	5.9	5.9	5.9	5.9	5.9	5.9	5.9
1	Marina Anissina; Gwendal Peizerat	France	0.6	Pl.	2	1	1	1	1	1	1	1	1
2	Irina Lobacheva; Ilia Averbukh	Russia	1.2	TM	5.8	5.7	5.7	5.8	5.8	5.8	5.7	5.8	5.8
2	Irina Lobacheva; Ilia Averbukh	Russia	1.2	PR	6.0	5.9	5.7	5.8	5.9	5.8	5.8	5.8	5.9
2	Irina Lobacheva; Ilia Averbukh	Russia	1.2	Pl.	1	3	3	2	2	2	2	2	2
3	Barbara Fusar-Poli; Maurizio Margaglio	Italy	1.8	TM	5.7	5.8	5.7	5.7	5.6	5.7	5.6	5.6	5.6
3	Barbara Fusar-Poli; Maurizio Margaglio	Italy	1.8	PR	5.8	5.9	5.8	5.8	5.8	5.8	5.8	5.8	5.8
3	Barbara Fusar-Poli; Maurizio Margaglio	Italy	1.8	Pl.	3	2	2	3	4	3	3	4	4
4	Shae-Lynn Bourne; Victor Kraatz	Canada	2.4	TM	5.6	5.5	5.6	5.3	5.7	5.6	5.6	5.7	5.7
4	Shae-Lynn Bourne; Victor Kraatz	Canada	2.4	PR	5.6	5.8	5.6	5.6	5.8	5.8	5.7	5.8	5.8
4	Shae-Lynn Bourne; Victor Kraatz	Canada	2.4	Pl.	5	5	5	6	3	4	4	3	3
5	Margarita Drobiazko; Povilas Vanagas	Lithuania	3.0	TM	5.6	5.6	5.6	5.6	5.5	5.5	5.6	5.5	5.6
5	Margarita Drobiazko; Povilas Vanagas	Lithuania	3.0	PR	5.7	5.8	5.7	5.7	5.7	5.6	5.6	5.7	5.6
5	Margarita Drobiazko; Povilas Vanagas	Lithuania	3.0	Pl.	4	4	4	4	6	6	5	5	6
6	Galit Chait; Sergei Sakhnovski	Israel	3.6	TM	5.4	5.4	5.2	5.4	5.6	5.5	5.3	5.4	5.5
6	Galit Chait; Sergei Sakhnovski	Israel	3.6	PR	5.6	5.7	5.5	5.6	5.7	5.7	5.6	5.6	5.7
6	Galit Chait; Sergei Sakhnovski	Israel	3.6	Pl.	6	6	9	5	5	5	6	6	5
7	Albena Denkova; Maxim Staviski	Bulgaria	4.2	TM	5.4	5.4	5.5	5.3	5.4	5.4	5.3	5.5	5.4
7	Albena Denkova; Maxim Staviski	Bulgaria	4.2	PR	5.5	5.3	5.4	5.4	5.6	5.4	5.4	5.5	5.6
7	Albena Denkova; Maxim Staviski	Bulgaria	4.2	Pl.	7	9	7	8	7	9	9	7	7
8	Kati Winkler; René Lohse	Germany	4.8	TM	5.3	5.3	5.3	5.2	5.3	5.4	5.3	5.3	5.4
8	Kati Winkler; René Lohse	Germany	4.8	PR	5.5	5.6	5.5	5.3	5.6	5.5	5.5	5.5	5.4
8	Kati Winkler; René Lohse	Germany	4.8	Pl.	8	7	8	9	9	7	7	8	10
9	Tatiana Navka; Roman Kostomarov	Russia	5.4	TM	5.2	5.2	5.4	5.1	5.2	5.2	5.4	5.4	5.4
9	Tatiana Navka; Roman Kostomarov	Russia	5.4	PR	5.5	5.4	5.5	5.3	5.6	5.5	5.4	5.4	5.5
9	Tatiana Navka; Roman Kostomarov	Russia	5.4	Pl.	9	10	6	10	10	10	8	9	8
10	Elena Grushina; Ruslan Honcharov	Ukraine	6.0	TM	5.0	5.4	4.9	5.2	5.5	5.3	5.0	5.2	5.3
10	Elena Grushina; Ruslan Honcharov	Ukraine	6.0	PR	5.3	5.4	5.1	5.2	5.5	5.5	5.2	5.5	5.5
10	Elena Grushina; Ruslan Honcharov	Ukraine	6.0	Pl.	13	8	14	11	8	8	12	10	9
11	Naomi Lang; Peter Tchernyshev	United States	6.6	TM	5.2	5.2	5.3	5.3	5.2	5.2	5.2	5.1	5.3
11	Naomi Lang; Peter Tchernyshev	United States	6.6	PR	5.4	5.3	5.4	5.5	5.3	5.4	5.3	5.4	5.3
11	Naomi Lang; Peter Tchernyshev	United States	6.6	Pl.	10	11	10	7	11	11	11	11	11
12	Marie-France Dubreuil; Patrice Lauzon	Canada	7.2	TM	5.3	5.1	5.2	4.8	5.0	5.1	5.3	5.2	5.2
12	Marie-France Dubreuil; Patrice Lauzon	Canada	7.2	PR	5.3	5.2	5.4	5.2	5.1	5.4	5.3	5.3	5.3
12	Marie-France Dubreuil; Patrice Lauzon	Canada	7.2	Pl.	11	12	11	12	12	12	10	12	13
13	Sylwia Nowak; Sebastian Kolasiński	Poland	7.8	TM	5.1	5.0	5.1	5.0	4.9	5.0	5.0	5.0	5.1
13	Sylwia Nowak; Sebastian Kolasiński	Poland	7.8	PR	5.3	5.2	5.2	5.0	5.1	5.1	5.1	5.2	5.4
13	Sylwia Nowak; Sebastian Kolasiński	Poland	7.8	Pl.	12	13	12	14	13	14	13	13	12
14	Eliane Hugentobler; Daniel Hugentobler	Switzerland	8.4	TM	4.9	4.7	5.0	4.9	4.7	4.9	4.9	5.0	5.0
14	Eliane Hugentobler; Daniel Hugentobler	Switzerland	8.4	PR	5.0	4.8	5.1	5.1	4.8	5.2	5.0	5.1	5.3
14	Eliane Hugentobler; Daniel Hugentobler	Switzerland	8.4	Pl.	14	14	13	13	14	13	14	15	14
15	Marika Humphreys; Vitali Baranov	Great Britain	9.0	TM	4.9	4.6	4.9	4.7	4.5	4.9	4.8	4.9	4.8
15	Marika Humphreys; Vitali Baranov	Great Britain	9.0	PR	4.9	4.8	5.0	5.0	4.7	5.1	5.0	5.2	5.1
15	Marika Humphreys; Vitali Baranov	Great Britain	9.0	Pl.	15	15	15	15	16	15	15	14	15
16	Isabelle Delobel; Olivier Schoenfelder	France	9.6	TM	4.4	4.4	4.6	4.4	4.5	4.4	4.6	4.6	4.7
16	Isabelle Delobel; Olivier Schoenfelder	France	9.6	PR	4.8	4.8	5.0	4.7	4.8	4.9	4.7	4.9	5.1
16	Isabelle Delobel; Olivier Schoenfelder	France	9.6	Pl.	17	17	16	17	15	16	16	16	16
17	Federica Faiella; Massimo Scali	Italy	10.2	TM	4.7	4.5	4.6	4.5	4.3	4.5	4.3	4.6	4.7
17	Federica Faiella; Massimo Scali	Italy	10.2	PR	5.0	4.8	4.9	4.7	4.7	4.6	4.7	4.6	4.7
17	Federica Faiella; Massimo Scali	Italy	10.2	Pl.	16	16	17	16	18	19	17	18	18
18	Kristin Fraser; Igor Lukanin	Azerbaijan	10.8	TM	4.7	4.2	4.6	4.3	4.5	4.5	4.4	4.5	4.6
18	Kristin Fraser; Igor Lukanin	Azerbaijan	10.8	PR	4.5	4.5	4.8	4.6	4.6	4.7	4.6	4.7	4.8
18	Kristin Fraser; Igor Lukanin	Azerbaijan	10.8	Pl.	19	19	18	18	17	17	18	17	17
19	Natalia Gudina; Alexei Beletski	Israel	11.4	TM	4.5	4.3	3.6	4.3	4.2	4.4	4.4	4.3	4.5
19	Natalia Gudina; Alexei Beletski	Israel	11.4	PR	4.7	4.5	3.8	4.5	4.5	4.7	4.5	4.5	4.7
19	Natalia Gudina; Alexei Beletski	Israel	11.4	Pl.	18	18	24	19	19	18	19	20	19
20	Kateřina Kovalová; David Szurman	Czech Republic	12.0	TM	4.4	4.2	4.4	4.1	4.2	4.2	4.2	4.4	4.5
20	Kateřina Kovalová; David Szurman	Czech Republic	12.0	PR	4.6	4.4	4.5	4.6	4.4	4.4	4.4	4.6	4.4
20	Kateřina Kovalová; David Szurman	Czech Republic	12.0	Pl.	20	21	19	20	20	20	20	19	21
21	Julia Golovina; Oleg Voyko	Ukraine	12.6	TM	4.3	4.1	3.8	4.2	4.1	4.0	4.0	4.3	4.4
21	Julia Golovina; Oleg Voyko	Ukraine	12.6	PR	4.3	4.5	4.0	4.5	4.2	4.2	4.4	4.4	4.5
21	Julia Golovina; Oleg Voyko	Ukraine	12.6	Pl.	21	20	23	21	22	22	21	21	20
22	Beata Handra; Charles Sinek	United States	13.2	TM	4.2	4.1	4.4	4.2	4.1	4.1	4.1	4.3	4.0
22	Beata Handra; Charles Sinek	United States	13.2	PR	4.3	4.3	4.3	4.3	4.3	4.4	4.3	4.3	4.4
22	Beata Handra; Charles Sinek	United States	13.2	Pl.	22	22	20	23	21	21	22	22	23
23	Zhang Weina; Cao Xianming	China	13.8	TM	4.3	3.9	4.0	4.1	3.8	4.0	4.2	4.1	4.2
23	Zhang Weina; Cao Xianming	China	13.8	PR	4.2	4.2	4.1	4.5	4.2	4.1	4.2	4.4	4.4
23	Zhang Weina; Cao Xianming	China	13.8	Pl.	23	23	22	22	24	23	23	23	22
24	Yang Tae-hwa; Lee Chuen-gun	South Korea	14.4	TM	4.1	3.7	4.0	4.1	4.0	3.9	4.0	4.0	4.0
24	Yang Tae-hwa; Lee Chuen-gun	South Korea	14.4	PR	4.2	4.0	4.2	4.2	4.2	4.1	4.1	4.2	4.2
24	Yang Tae-hwa; Lee Chuen-gun	South Korea	14.4	Pl.	24	24	21	24	23	24	24	24	24

=== Free dance ===
Marina Anissina and Gwendal Peizerat of France won the gold medals. It was the first gold-medal victory in figure skating for France since 1932, when Andrée and Pierre Brunet won the pairs event. A Soviet or Russian team had won the ice dance title the previous four Winter Olympics, but Irina Lobacheva and Ilia Averbukh won the silver.

Free dance results
Pl.	Team	Nation	Pts.	Judges' scores and placements									
Pl.	Team	Nation	Pts.		(Russia)	(Switzerland)	(Lithuania)	(Germany)	(Italy)	(Azerbaijan)	(Bulgaria)	(Ukraine)	(Poland)
1	Marina Anissina; Gwendal Peizerat	France	1.0	TM	5.8	5.8	5.7	5.7	5.7	5.8	5.8	5.7	5.7
1	Marina Anissina; Gwendal Peizerat	France	1.0	PR	5.8	5.8	5.9	5.8	5.9	5.9	5.9	5.9	5.9
1	Marina Anissina; Gwendal Peizerat	France	1.0	Pl.	2	2	1	2	2	1	1	1	1
2	Irina Lobacheva; Ilia Averbukh	Russia	2.0	TM	5.7	5.8	5.8	5.6	5.8	5.7	5.8	5.8	5.8
2	Irina Lobacheva; Ilia Averbukh	Russia	2.0	PR	5.9	5.9	5.8	5.9	5.9	5.9	5.8	5.8	5.8
2	Irina Lobacheva; Ilia Averbukh	Russia	2.0	Pl.	1	1	2	1	1	2	2	2	2
3	Barbara Fusar-Poli; Maurizio Margaglio	Italy	3.0	TM	5.5	5.6	5.5	5.5	5.7	5.6	5.6	5.6	5.5
3	Barbara Fusar-Poli; Maurizio Margaglio	Italy	3.0	PR	5.9	5.7	5.8	5.8	5.8	5.8	5.8	5.7	5.8
3	Barbara Fusar-Poli; Maurizio Margaglio	Italy	3.0	Pl.	3	3	4	4	3	3	4	4	3
4	Shae-Lynn Bourne; Victor Kraatz	Canada	4.0	TM	5.4	5.6	5.4	5.6	5.4	5.5	5.7	5.7	5.5
4	Shae-Lynn Bourne; Victor Kraatz	Canada	4.0	PR	5.8	5.6	5.8	5.8	5.8	5.8	5.8	5.7	5.7
4	Shae-Lynn Bourne; Victor Kraatz	Canada	4.0	Pl.	5	5	5	3	5	4	3	3	4
5	Margarita Drobiazko; Povilas Vanagas	Lithuania	5.0	TM	5.6	5.5	5.6	5.6	5.6	5.5	5.6	5.6	5.5
5	Margarita Drobiazko; Povilas Vanagas	Lithuania	5.0	PR	5.8	5.7	5.8	5.7	5.7	5.7	5.7	5.6	5.6
5	Margarita Drobiazko; Povilas Vanagas	Lithuania	5.0	Pl.	4	4	3	5	4	5	5	6	5
6	Galit Chait; Sergei Sakhnovski	Israel	6.0	TM	5.5	5.4	5.4	5.4	5.4	5.5	5.4	5.5	5.4
6	Galit Chait; Sergei Sakhnovski	Israel	6.0	PR	5.7	5.5	5.5	5.6	5.7	5.6	5.7	5.7	5.6
6	Galit Chait; Sergei Sakhnovski	Israel	6.0	Pl.	6	6	8	6	6	6	6	5	6
7	Albena Denkova; Maxim Staviski	Bulgaria	7.0	TM	5.4	5.4	5.5	5.4	5.4	5.4	5.5	5.4	5.5
7	Albena Denkova; Maxim Staviski	Bulgaria	7.0	PR	5.7	5.4	5.5	5.3	5.5	5.6	5.6	5.6	5.5
7	Albena Denkova; Maxim Staviski	Bulgaria	7.0	Pl.	7	7	7	8	7	7	7	7	7
8	Kati Winkler; René Lohse	Germany	8.0	TM	5.3	5.2	5.4	5.3	5.3	5.3	5.3	5.4	5.4
8	Kati Winkler; René Lohse	Germany	8.0	PR	5.6	5.4	5.6	5.5	5.5	5.6	5.5	5.5	5.5
8	Kati Winkler; René Lohse	Germany	8.0	Pl.	10	9	6	7	8	8	10	8	9
9	Elena Grushina; Ruslan Honcharov	Ukraine	9.0	TM	5.5	5.3	5.1	5.1	5.3	5.4	5.3	5.3	5.2
9	Elena Grushina; Ruslan Honcharov	Ukraine	9.0	PR	5.6	5.3	5.4	5.2	5.4	5.5	5.6	5.5	5.4
9	Elena Grushina; Ruslan Honcharov	Ukraine	9.0	Pl.	8	10	10	12	9	9	9	9	11
10	Tatiana Navka; Roman Kostomarov	Russia	10.0	TM	5.4	5.2	5.2	5.3	5.1	5.2	5.4	5.3	5.3
10	Tatiana Navka; Roman Kostomarov	Russia	10.0	PR	5.6	5.5	5.3	5.3	5.5	5.6	5.6	5.4	5.6
10	Tatiana Navka; Roman Kostomarov	Russia	10.0	Pl.	9	8	11	9	10	10	8	10	8
11	Naomi Lang; Peter Tchernyshev	United States	11.0	TM	5.3	5.2	5.4	5.1	5.2	5.3	5.2	5.2	5.2
11	Naomi Lang; Peter Tchernyshev	United States	11.0	PR	5.5	5.3	5.5	5.4	5.4	5.3	5.4	5.4	5.5
11	Naomi Lang; Peter Tchernyshev	United States	11.0	Pl.	11	11	8	10	11	11	12	11	10
12	Marie-France Dubreuil; Patrice Lauzon	Canada	12.0	TM	5.2	5.1	5.2	5.2	5.1	5.0	5.3	5.1	5.3
12	Marie-France Dubreuil; Patrice Lauzon	Canada	12.0	PR	5.3	5.2	5.1	5.2	5.3	5.2	5.4	5.4	5.3
12	Marie-France Dubreuil; Patrice Lauzon	Canada	12.0	Pl.	14	12	13	11	12	14	11	12	12
13	Sylwia Nowak; Sebastian Kolasiński	Poland	13.0	TM	5.2	5.0	5.1	5.1	5.0	5.0	5.0	5.2	5.1
13	Sylwia Nowak; Sebastian Kolasiński	Poland	13.0	PR	5.4	5.1	5.2	5.1	5.2	5.3	5.2	5.2	5.3
13	Sylwia Nowak; Sebastian Kolasiński	Poland	13.0	Pl.	12	14	12	14	13	13	13	13	13
14	Eliane Hugentobler; Daniel Hugentobler	Switzerland	14.0	TM	5.1	5.0	5.1	5.0	4.9	5.2	5.1	5.1	5.0
14	Eliane Hugentobler; Daniel Hugentobler	Switzerland	14.0	PR	5.4	5.2	5.1	5.2	5.1	5.3	5.1	5.2	5.2
14	Eliane Hugentobler; Daniel Hugentobler	Switzerland	14.0	Pl.	13	13	14	13	14	12	14	14	14
15	Marika Humphreys; Vitali Baranov	Great Britain	15.0	TM	5.0	4.8	4.8	4.8	4.7	4.9	4.9	5.0	4.7
15	Marika Humphreys; Vitali Baranov	Great Britain	15.0	PR	5.1	5.0	5.0	5.0	5.0	5.2	5.1	5.2	4.9
15	Marika Humphreys; Vitali Baranov	Great Britain	15.0	Pl.	15	15	15	15	16	15	15	15	17
16	Isabelle Delobel; Olivier Schoenfelder	France	16.0	TM	4.7	4.7	4.7	4.6	4.7	4.8	4.7	4.8	4.8
16	Isabelle Delobel; Olivier Schoenfelder	France	16.0	PR	5.2	5.0	5.0	5.1	5.2	5.2	5.2	5.3	5.2
16	Isabelle Delobel; Olivier Schoenfelder	France	16.0	Pl.	16	16	16	16	15	16	16	16	15
17	Kristin Fraser; Igor Lukanin	Azerbaijan	17.0	TM	4.7	4.7	4.7	4.6	4.6	4.8	4.7	4.6	4.6
17	Kristin Fraser; Igor Lukanin	Azerbaijan	17.0	PR	4.8	4.7	4.9	4.8	4.8	5.0	4.9	4.8	4.8
17	Kristin Fraser; Igor Lukanin	Azerbaijan	17.0	Pl.	17	17	17	18	18	17	17	17	18
18	Federica Faiella; Massimo Scali	Italy	18.0	TM	4.6	4.6	4.6	4.7	4.7	4.6	4.6	4.7	4.8
18	Federica Faiella; Massimo Scali	Italy	18.0	PR	4.8	4.7	4.9	4.8	4.8	4.9	4.9	4.7	5.1
18	Federica Faiella; Massimo Scali	Italy	18.0	Pl.	18	18	18	17	17	18	18	18	16
19	Natalia Gudina; Alexei Beletski	Israel	19.0	TM	4.5	4.5	4.6	4.4	4.5	4.5	4.2	4.3	4.4
19	Natalia Gudina; Alexei Beletski	Israel	19.0	PR	4.7	4.7	4.8	4.6	4.7	4.9	4.5	4.6	4.7
19	Natalia Gudina; Alexei Beletski	Israel	19.0	Pl.	19	19	19	20	19	19	20	19	19
20	Kateřina Kovalová; David Szurman	Czech Republic	20.0	TM	4.5	4.5	4.5	4.7	4.4	4.6	4.7	4.4	4.5
20	Kateřina Kovalová; David Szurman	Czech Republic	20.0	PR	4.5	4.6	4.8	4.7	4.6	4.8	4.8	4.5	4.6
20	Kateřina Kovalová; David Szurman	Czech Republic	20.0	Pl.	21	20	20	19	20	20	19	20	20
21	Zhang Weina; Cao Xianming	China	21.0	TM	4.2	4.1	4.5	4.4	4.4	4.1	4.2	4.1	4.4
21	Zhang Weina; Cao Xianming	China	21.0	PR	4.4	4.4	4.6	4.5	4.5	4.5	4.4	4.4	4.6
21	Zhang Weina; Cao Xianming	China	21.0	Pl.	22	23	21	21	21	22	21	22	21
22	Julia Golovina; Oleg Voyko	Ukraine	22.0	TM	4.4	4.3	4.4	4.3	4.2	4.3	4.3	4.2	4.2
22	Julia Golovina; Oleg Voyko	Ukraine	22.0	PR	4.6	4.5	4.6	4.5	4.4	4.4	4.3	4.5	4.4
22	Julia Golovina; Oleg Voyko	Ukraine	22.0	Pl.	20	21	22	22	22	21	22	21	22
23	Beata Handra; Charles Sinek	United States	23.0	TM	4.0	4.2	4.2	4.0	4.0	4.1	4.2	4.0	4.1
23	Beata Handra; Charles Sinek	United States	23.0	PR	4.4	4.4	4.5	4.3	4.3	4.3	4.3	4.3	4.2
23	Beata Handra; Charles Sinek	United States	23.0	Pl.	23	22	23	23	23	23	23	23	23
24	Yang Tae-hwa; Lee Chuen-gun	South Korea	24.0	TM	4.0	4.0	4.2	4.0	3.8	4.0	4.0	3.8	3.8
24	Yang Tae-hwa; Lee Chuen-gun	South Korea	24.0	PR	4.2	4.2	4.4	4.2	4.1	4.2	4.2	4.1	4.1
24	Yang Tae-hwa; Lee Chuen-gun	South Korea	24.0	Pl.	24	24	24	24	24	24	24	24	24

=== Overall ===
Ice dance results
Rank	Team	Nation	Total	CD1		CD2		OD		FD	
1st place, gold medalist(s)	Marina Anissina; Gwendal Peizerat	France	2.0	1	0.2	1	0.2	1	0.6	1	1.0
2nd place, silver medalist(s)	Irina Lobacheva; Ilia Averbukh	Russia	4.0	2	0.4	2	0.4	2	1.2	2	2.0
3rd place, bronze medalist(s)	Barbara Fusar-Poli; Maurizio Margaglio	Italy	6.0	3	0.6	3	0.6	3	1.8	3	3.0
4	Shae-Lynn Bourne; Victor Kraatz	Canada	8.0	4	0.8	4	0.8	4	2.4	4	4.0
5	Margarita Drobiazko; Povilas Vanagas	Lithuania	10.0	5	1.0	5	1.0	5	3.0	5	5.0
6	Galit Chait; Sergei Sakhnovski	Israel	12.0	6	1.2	6	1.2	6	3.6	6	6.0
7	Albena Denkova; Maxim Staviski	Bulgaria	14.0	7	1.4	7	1.4	7	4.2	7	7.0
8	Kati Winkler; René Lohse	Germany	16.0	8	1.6	8	1.6	8	4.8	8	8.0
9	Elena Grushina; Ruslan Honcharov	Ukraine	19.0	10	2.0	10	2.0	10	6.0	9	9.0
10	Tatiana Navka; Roman Kostomarov	Russia	19.0	9	1.8	9	1.8	9	5.4	10	10.0
11	Naomi Lang; Peter Tchernyshev	United States	22.2	12	2.4	11	2.2	11	6.6	11	11.0
12	Marie-France Dubreuil; Patrice Lauzon	Canada	23.8	11	2.2	12	2.4	12	7.2	12	12.0
13	Sylwia Nowak; Sebastian Kolasiński	Poland	26.0	13	2.6	13	2.6	13	7.8	13	13.0
14	Eliane Hugentobler; Daniel Hugentobler	Switzerland	28.4	15	3.0	15	3.0	14	8.4	14	14.0
15	Marika Humphreys; Vitali Baranov	Great Britain	30.4	16	3.2	16	3.2	15	9.0	15	15.0
16	Isabelle Delobel; Olivier Schoenfelder	France	31.2	14	2.8	14	2.8	16	9.6	16	16.0
17	Kristin Fraser; Igor Lukanin	Azerbaijan	34.6	17	3.4	17	3.4	18	10.8	17	17.0
18	Federica Faiella; Massimo Scali	Italy	35.4	18	3.6	18	3.6	17	10.2	18	18.0
19	Natalia Gudina; Alexei Beletski	Israel	38.0	19	3.8	19	3.8	19	11.4	19	19.0
20	Kateřina Kovalová; David Szurman	Czech Republic	40.4	21	4.2	21	4.2	20	12.0	20	20.0
21	Julia Golovina; Oleg Voyko	Ukraine	43.4	22	4.4	22	4.4	21	12.6	22	22.0
22	Zhang Weina; Cao Xianming	China	44.0	23	4.6	23	4.6	23	13.8	21	21.0
23	Beata Handra; Charles Sinek	United States	44.2	20	4.0	20	4.0	22	13.2	23	23.0
24	Yang Tae-hwa; Lee Chuen-gun	South Korea	48.0	24	4.8	24	4.8	24	14.4	24	24.0

== Aftermath ==
Margarita Drobiazko and Povilas Vanagas of Lithuania filed a complaint with the International Skating Union (ISU) on February 19, 2002, alleging judging irregularities in the ice dance event. Their protest addressed the fact that two teams – Barbara Fusar-Poli and Maurizio Margaglio of Italy, and Shae-Lynn Bourne and Victor Kraatz of Canada – both placed ahead of them even though they each fell during the free dance. The Lithuanian team stated that the judges did not assess the required penalty deduction for each fall, which they believe would have affected the outcome of the competition. Their complaint was rejected by the ISU.

On April 30, 2002, the ISU announced that Marie-Reine Le Gougne and Didier Gailhaguet had both been suspended for three years for their roles in the judging scandal and were also prohibited from any official involvement with the 2006 Winter Olympics. On July 31, 2002, Italian authorities arrested Russian organized crime boss Alimzhan Tokhtakhounov on U.S. charges that he masterminded the scheme at the Olympics. Tokhtakhounov, whose phone had been wiretapped by the Italian Guardia di Finanza over suspicions of money laundering, had been overheard conspiring to fix the outcomes of two Olympic skating competitions: Le Gougne would vote for the Russian team in the pairs event, while the Russian judge would vote for the French team in the ice dance event. Tokhtakhounov had been friends with Marina Anissina and her mother, Irina Cherniaeva. According to transcripts, Tokhtakhounov had assured Chernayeva that Anissina's gold medal in the ice dance event was guaranteed, "even if she [fell]."

In 2004, the ISU voted to retire the 6.0 judging system on grounds that it was too subjective. As a result, the ISU Judging System was created, where each skater or team is scored based on the technical grade of execution of the elements and given a mathematical score. The ISU also adopted a policy of secret judging, where judges' marks were posted anonymously. While the ISU stated that this secrecy freed judges from pressure from their federations, critics responded that instead of preventing judges from cheating, the secrecy prevented the public and media from being able to identify malfeasance. Following the 2014 Winter Olympics, the ISU Congress voted to change this policy, ending anonymous judging to "increase transparency" in the process.

== Works cited ==
- Kestnbaum, Ellyn (2003). Culture on Ice: Figure Skating and Cultural Meaning. Middletown, Connecticut: Wesleyan University Press. ISBN 978-0819566423.
