= Israel at the 2002 Winter Olympics =

- IOC code: ISR
- NOC: Olympic Committee of Israel
- Website: www.olympicsil.co.il (in Hebrew and English)

in Salt Lake City, Utah
- Competitors: 5 (2 men, 3 women) in 2 sports
- Flag bearer: Galit Chait
- Medals: Gold 0 Silver 0 Bronze 0 Total 0

Winter Olympics appearances (overview)
- 1994; 1998; 2002; 2006; 2010; 2014; 2018; 2022; 2026

Israel was represented at the 2002 Winter Olympics in Salt Lake City, Utah, United States by the Olympic Committee of Israel.

In total, five athletes including two men and three woman represented Israel in two different sports including figure skating and short track speed skating.

== Competitors ==
In total, five athletes represented Israel at the 2002 Winter Olympics in Salt Lake City, Utah, United States across two different sports.

Sport	Men	Women	Total
Figure skating	2	2	4
Short track speed skating	0	1	1
Total	2	3	5

== Figure skating ==
In total, four Israeli athletes participated in the figure skating events – Alexei Beletski, Galit Chait, Natalia Gudina and Sergei Sakhnovski in the ice dance.

The ice dance took place on 15, 17 and 18 February 2002. Chait and Sakhnovski were ranked sixth in each of the four dances and finished sixth overall. Gudina and Beletski were ranked 19th in each of the four dances and finished 19th overall.

Athlete(s)	Event	CD1	CD2	SP/OD	FS/FD	Total	
Athlete(s)	Event	FP	FP	FP	FP	TFP	Rank
Galit Chait and Sergei Sakhnovski	Ice dance	6	6	6	6	12.0	6
Natalia Gudina and Alexei Beletski	Ice dance	19	19	19	19	38.0	19

== Short track speed skating ==
In total, one Israeli athlete participated in the short track speed skating events – Olga Danilov in the women's 500 m, the women's 1,000 m and the women's 1,500 m.

The women's 1,500 m took place on 13 February 2002. Danilov finished third in her heat in a time of two minutes 32.458 to advance to the semi-finals. She finished fifth in her semi-final in a time of two minutes 36.114 and did not advance to the finals.

The women's 500 m took place on 16 February 2002. Danilov finished second in her heat in a time of 46.422 to advance to the quarter-finals. She finished fourth in her quarter-final in a time of 46.695 and did not advance to the semi-finals.

Round one for the women's 1,000 m took place on 20 February 2002. Danilov finished third in her heat in a time of one minute 42.767 and did not advance to the quarter-finals.

Gender	Athlete	Event	Heat		Quarterfinal		Semifinal		Final	
Gender	Athlete	Event	Time	Rank	Time	Rank	Time	Rank	Time	Rank
Women's	Olga Danilov	500 m	46.422	2 Q	46.695	4	did not advance			16
Women's	Olga Danilov	1,000 m	1:42.767	3	did not advance					21
Women's	Olga Danilov	1,500 m	2:32.458	3 Q	2:36.114	5	did not finish			14
