= Noa Szőllős =

Hungarian-Israeli alpine skier

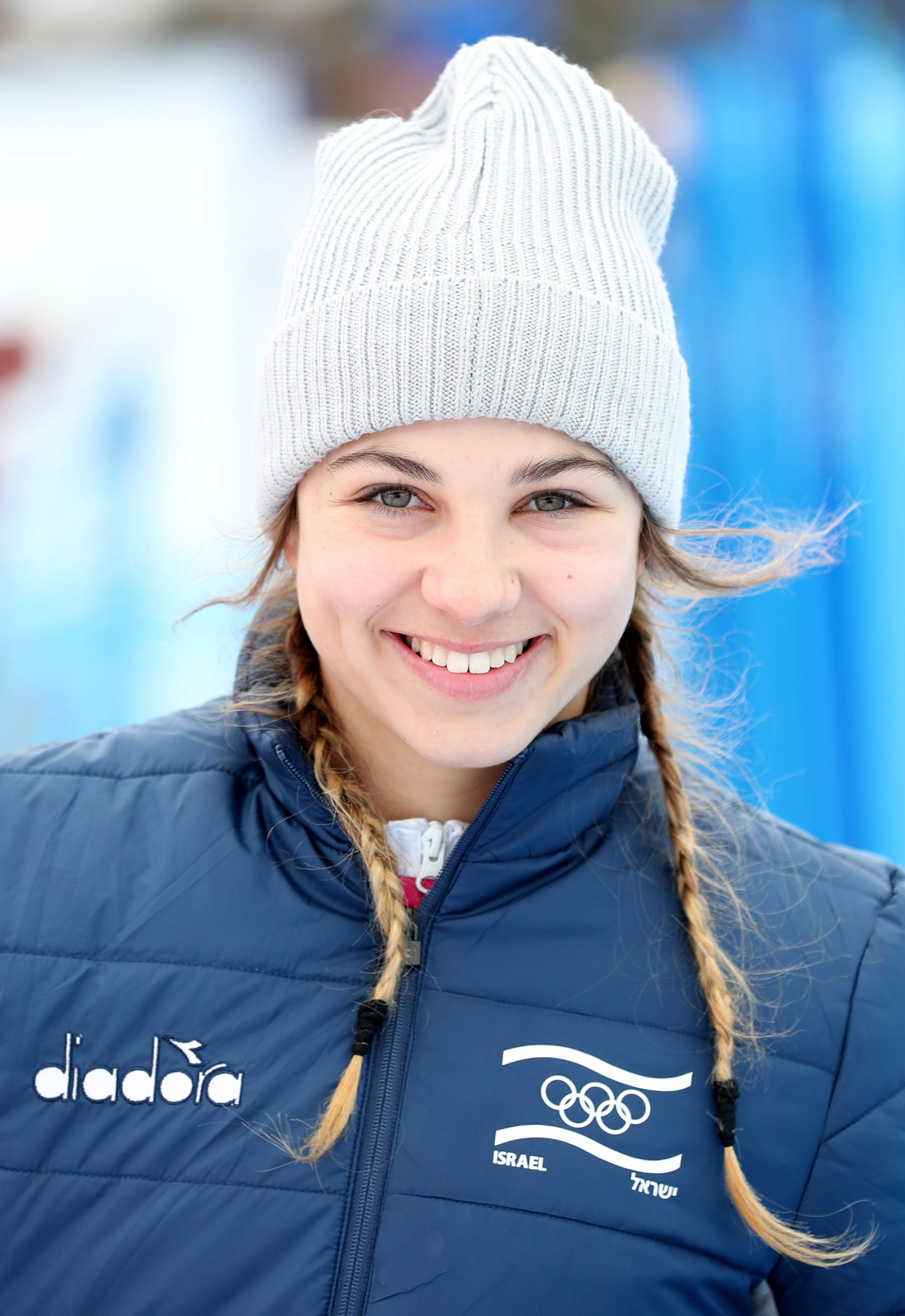
- Szőllős in 2020

Personal information
- Native name: נועה סולוש
- Born: 3 February 2003 (age 23) Budapest, Hungary

Skiing career
- Country: Israel
- Sport: Alpine skiing
- Club: Nivelco Racing Team
- Disciplines: Downhill, super-G, giant slalom, slalom
- World Cup debut: 8 January 2022 (age 18)

Olympics
- Teams: 2 – (2022, 2026)
- Medals: 0

World Championships
- Teams: 3 – (2021, 2023, 2025)
- Medals: 0

World Cup
- Seasons: 5 – (2022–2026)
- Podiums: 0
- Overall titles: 0 – (137th in 2026)
- Discipline titles: 0 – (59th in SL, 2026)
Medal record
Representing Israel
Youth Olympic Games
| Silver medal – second place | 2020 Lausanne | Combined |
| Bronze medal – third place | 2020 Lausanne | Super-G |

Noa Szőllős (Hebrew: נועה סולוש; born 3 February 2003) is a female Hungarian-born Israeli alpine ski racer born in Budapest, Hungary.

== Career ==
Szőllős and her brother, alpine ski racer Barnabás Szőllős, were selected by the Olympic Committee of Israel to compete for Israel in both the Beijing 2022 Winter Olympics and Milano Cortina 2026 Winter Olympics. Noa Szőllős became the youngest Israeli to medal at the 2020 Winter Youth Olympics when she was 16, taking home silver and bronze in alpine events.

Her favorite event in alpine skiing is the giant slalom.

Her oldest brother is fellow alpine ski racer Benjamin Szőllős.

== World Cup results ==
=== Season standings ===
Season
| Season | Age | Overall | Slalom | Giant slalom | Super-G | Downhill |
| 2026 | 23 | 137 | 59 | — | — | — |

== World Championships results ==
Year
| Year | Age | Slalom | Giant slalom | Super-G | Downhill | Combined | Team combined | Parallel | Team event |
| 2021 | 18 | DNF1 | 32 | — | — | DNF1 | —N/a | DNQ | — |
| 2023 | 20 | 37 | DNF1 | 29 | — | 17 | —N/a | — | — |
| 2025 | 22 | DNF1 | DNF2 | — | — | —N/a | — | —N/a | — |

== Olympic results ==
Year
| Year | Age | Slalom | Giant slalom | Super-G | Downhill | Combined | Team combined |
| 2022 | 19 | 41 | DNF2 | 34 | — | — | —N/a |
| 2026 | 23 | DNF1 | 35 | — | — | —N/a | — |
