= Israel at the 2014 Winter Olympics =

- IOC code: ISR
- NOC: Olympic Committee of Israel
- Website: www.olympicsil.co.il (in Hebrew and English)

in Sochi
- Competitors: 5 in 3 sports
- Flag bearers: Vladislav Bykanov (opening and closing)
- Medals: Gold 0 Silver 0 Bronze 0 Total 0

Winter Olympics appearances (overview)
- 1994; 1998; 2002; 2006; 2010; 2014; 2018; 2022; 2026

Israel competed at the 2014 Winter Olympics in Sochi, Russia. The team consisted of five athletes. Vladislav Bykanov was the first male athlete to qualify from Israel in short track speed skating.

The 2014 Games marked the first time an Israeli Olympic team competed in Russia, as Israel and 64 western countries took part at the American-led boycott in the 1980 Summer Olympics held in Moscow due to the Soviet–Afghan War.

== Competitors ==
Sport	Men	Women	Total
Alpine skiing	1	0	1
Figure skating	2	1	3
Short track speed skating	1	0	1
Total	4	1	5

== Alpine skiing ==
According to the quota allocation released on January 20, 2014 Israel had qualified two athletes, however only one athlete was selected to compete. Virgile Vandeput missed both races he was entered in, as he was injured during training.

Athlete	Event	Run 1		Run 2		Total	
Athlete	Event	Time	Rank	Time	Rank	Time	Rank
Virgile Vandeput	Men's giant slalom	DNS					
Virgile Vandeput	Men's slalom	DNS					

== Figure skating ==
Three skaters qualified to represent Israel. Alexei Bychenko finished the men's singles competition in 21st out of 30 competitors. Andrea Davidovich and Evgeni Krasnopolski finished the pairs skating competition in 15th place out of 20 pairs.

Athlete	Event	SP		FS		Total	
Athlete	Event	Points	Rank	Points	Rank	Points	Rank
Alexei Bychenko	Men's singles	62.44	22 Q	114.62	21	177.06	21
Andrea Davidovich / Evgeni Krasnopolski	Pairs skating	53.38	15 Q	94.35	15	147.73	15

== Short track speed skating ==
Israel achieved the following quota place: Vladislav Bykanov failed to advance out of the opening heats in all three of his events.

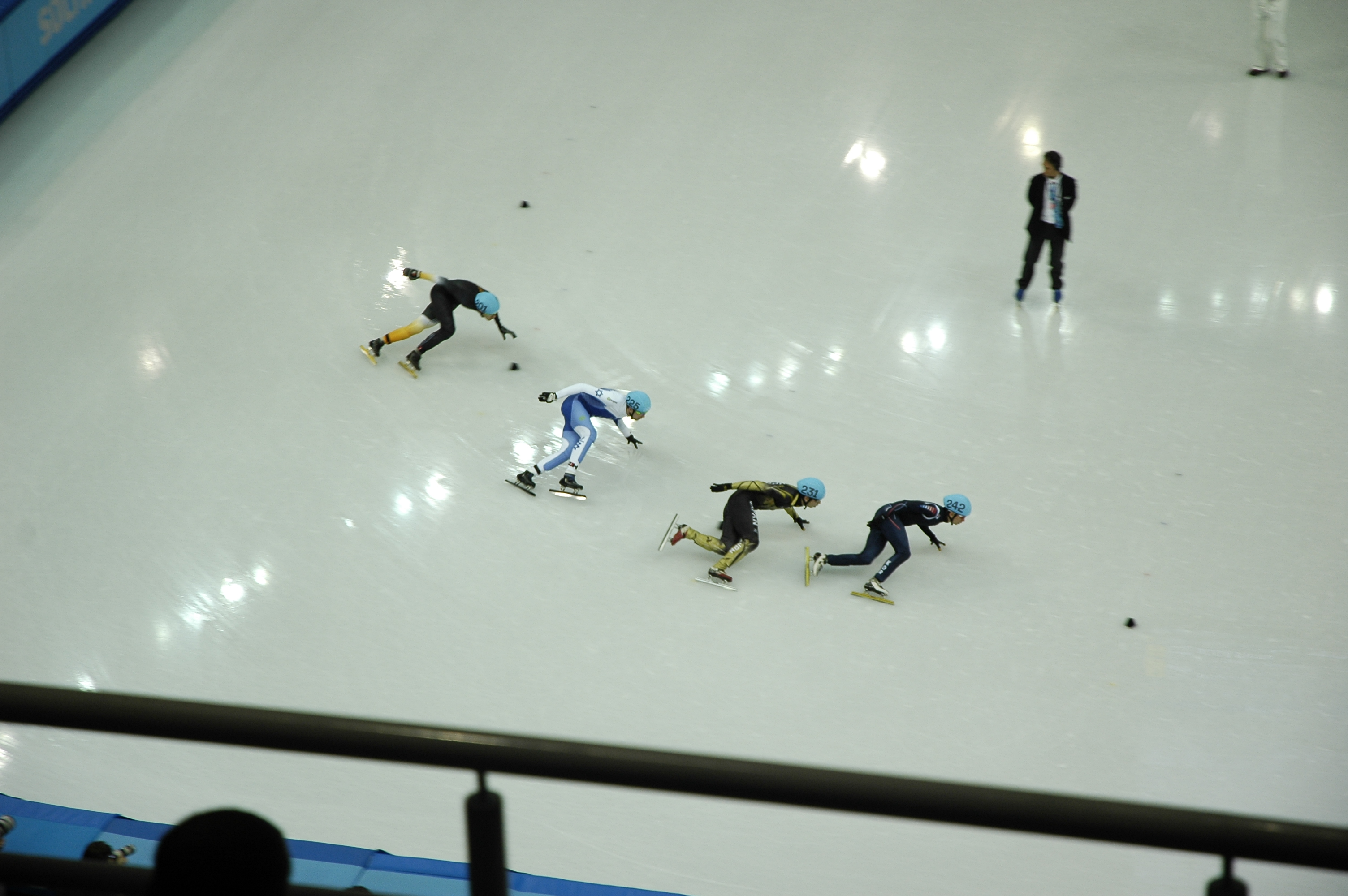
Vladislav Bykanov (second left) competing in the men's 500 m

Men

Athlete	Event	Heat		Quarterfinal		Semifinal		Final	
Athlete	Event	Time	Rank	Time	Rank	Time	Rank	Time	Rank
Vladislav Bykanov	500 m	41.769	3	Did not advance					19
Vladislav Bykanov	1000 m	1:27.796	3	Did not advance					24
Vladislav Bykanov	1500 m	2:21.163	4	—N/a		Did not advance			25

== Non-qualified athletes ==
Bradley Chalupski attempted to qualify in skeleton but had difficulty convincing the Israeli Olympic Committee to allow him to do so. A group of female alpine skiers also competed and qualified, but Israel decided not to use its quota it earned.

== See also ==
- Israel at the 2014 Summer Youth Olympics
