= Israel at the 2022 Winter Olympics =

- Flag of Israel
- IOC code: ISR
- NOC: Olympic Committee of Israel
- Website: www.olympicsil.co.il (in Hebrew and English)

in Beijing, China 4–20 February 2022
- Competitors: 6 (4 men and 2 women) in 3 sports and 13 events
- Flag bearers (opening): Evgeni Krasnopolski; Noa Szőllős
- Flag bearer (closing): Volunteer
- Medals: Gold 0 Silver 0 Bronze 0 Total 0

Winter Olympics appearances (overview)
- 1994; 1998; 2002; 2006; 2010; 2014; 2018; 2022; 2026

Israel competed at the 2022 Winter Olympics in Beijing, China, from 4 to 20 February 2022.

Figure skater Evgeni Krasnopolski and alpine ski racer Noa Szőllős were chosen as the nation's flag bearers at the opening ceremony. A volunteer was the flagbearer during the closing ceremony.

The Israeli delegation did not win any medals at these games. Barnabás Szőllős' sixth-place finish in the men's combined downhill was the best result attained so far by an Israeli athlete at the Winter Olympics.

== Competitors ==
The Israeli delegation included 6 athletes, competing in 3 disciplines.

Sport	Men	Women	Total
Alpine skiing	1	1	2
Figure skating	2	1	3
Short track speed skating	1	0	1
Total	4	2	6

== Alpine skiing ==
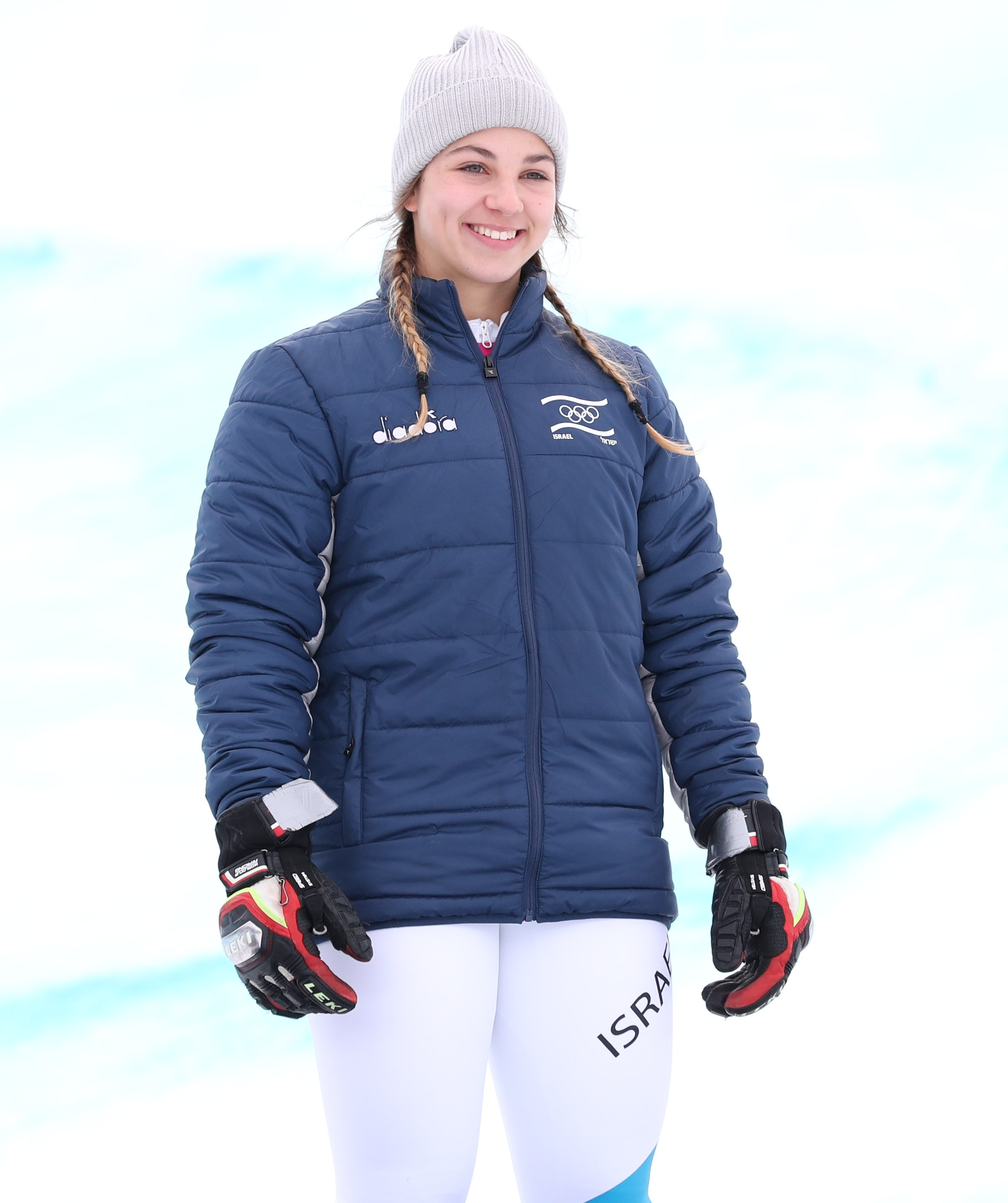
Noa Szőllős, Alpine skier

Israel qualified two male and one female athletes for alpine skiing, but declined one male quota. Noa Szőllős and her brother Barnabás Szőllős were selected by the Olympic Committee of Israel to compete for the country.

Barnabas Szőllős' sixth-place finish overall in the combined Alpine skiing event was Israel's best Olympic skiing result to date.

Athlete	Event	Run 1		Run 2		Total	
Athlete	Event	Time	Rank	Time	Rank	Time	Rank
Barnabás Szőllős	Men's downhill	—N/a				1:46.88	30
Barnabás Szőllős	Men's super-G	—N/a				1:24.28	30
Barnabás Szőllős	Men's combined	1:45.04	11	48.14	2	2:33.18	6
Barnabás Szőllős	Men's giant slalom	1:07.89	28	1:10.04	21	2:17.93	22
Barnabás Szőllős	Men's slalom	56.83	28	51.88	23	1:48.71	23
Noa Szőllős	Women's super-G	—N/a				1:17.94	34
Noa Szőllős	Women's giant slalom	1:04.90	42	DNF			
Noa Szőllős	Women's slalom	58.21	45	59.13	41	1:57.34	41

== Figure skating ==
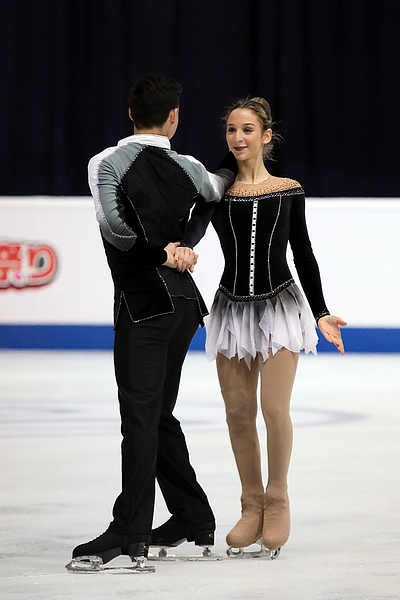
Hailey Kops, figure skater

In the 2021 World Figure Skating Championships in Stockholm, Sweden, Oleksii Bychenko finished in 24th place with 190.45 points, and earned one quota place for the Israeli delegation in the men's event. In the 2021 Nebelhorn Trophy in Oberstdorf, Germany, Hailey Kops and Evgeni Krasnopolski finished in 5th place with 167.08 points, and earned one quota place for the Israeli delegation in the pairs event.

Bychenko, Kops, and Krasnopolski were chosen by the Olympic Committee of Israel to represent Israel at the games. This was Bychenko and Krasnopolski's third appearance at the Olympic Games.

Athlete	Event	SP		FS		Total	
Athlete	Event	Points	Rank	Points	Rank	Points	Rank
Alexei Bychenko	Men's singles	68.01	26	Did not advance			
Hailey Kops; Evgeni Krasnopolski	Pair skating	55.99	15	97.83	15	153.82	15

== Short track speed skating ==
Israel won a quota place after Vladislav Bykanov participated in the 2021–22 ISU Short Track Speed Skating World Cup Competitions according to the Special Olympic Qualification Classification. The Olympic Committee of Israel chose Bykanov to represent Israel at the games. This was Bykanov's third appearance at the Olympic Games.

Bykanov advanced to the semi-finals of the 1500m. It was the first time in eight attempts at the Winter Olympics that he advanced past the first stage.

Men

Athlete	Event	Heat		Quarterfinal		Semifinal		Final	
Athlete	Event	Time	Rank	Time	Rank	Time	Rank	Time	Rank
Vladislav Bykanov	500 m	40.900	2 Q	41.157	3	Did not advance			12
Vladislav Bykanov	1000 m	1:24.875	4	Did not advance					24
Vladislav Bykanov	1500 m	—N/a		2:09.932	4 q	2:13.491	6	Did not advance	17

Qualification legend

- Q – Qualified for the next round
- q – Qualified for the next round as a fastest loser
- ADV – Advanced due to being impeded by another skater
- FA – Qualify to medal round
- FB – Qualify to consolation round
- AA – Advance to medal round due to being impeded by another skater
