= Israel at the 2026 Winter Olympics =

- Flag of Israel
- IOC code: ISR
- NOC: Olympic Committee of Israel
- Website: www.olympicsil.co.il (in Hebrew and English)

in Milan and Cortina d'Ampezzo, Italy 6 February 2026 – 22 February 2026
- Competitors: 9 (7 men and 2 women) in 5 sports and 11 events
- Flag bearers (opening): Jared Firestone (Cortina); Mariia Seniuk (Milan)
- Flag bearer (closing): Barnabás Szőllős
- Medals: Gold 0 Silver 0 Bronze 0 Total 0

Winter Olympics appearances (overview)
- 1994; 1998; 2002; 2006; 2010; 2014; 2018; 2022; 2026

Israel competed at the 2026 Winter Olympics in Milan and Cortina d'Ampezzo, Italy, from 6 to 22 February 2026.

Figure skater Mariia Seniuk and skeleton racer Jared Firestone were the nation's flagbearers at the opening ceremony. Seniuk carried the flag at milan while Firestone carried the flag at cortina. Alpine ski racer Barnabás Szőllős was the nation's flagbearer at the closing ceremony.

The Israeli delegation did not win any medals at these games. Israeli athletes competed for the first time in Cross-country skiing and Bobsleigh.

== Participation controversy ==
Israel's participation in the 2026 Winter Olympics took place amid protests and political criticism related to the Gaza war. Demonstrations in Italy called for Israel to be barred from the Games, with activists arguing that the country should face restrictions similar to those imposed on Russia following its invasion of Ukraine. The IOC ruled that Israel's Olympic team didn't commit any violations against the Palestinian's Olympic team, which was different then when Russia tried to absorb Ukraine's Olympic team.

The Palestinian Olympic Committee and other critics accused the International Olympic Committee (IOC) of applying "double standards" by allowing Israel to compete while sanctioning Russia. The IOC stated that the situations were "not comparable" and maintained that Israeli and Palestinian athletes should both be able to participate in the Olympic Games.

During the Games, Israel's participation also became the subject of a broadcast controversy after a Swiss television commentator questioned the presence of Israeli bobsleigh athlete Adam Edelman in the context of the Gaza war.

== Competitors ==
The Israeli delegation included 9 athletes, competing in 9 disciplines

Sport	Men	Women	Total
Alpine skiing	1	1	2
Bobsleigh	4	0	4
Cross-country skiing	1	0	1
Figure skating	0	1	1
Skeleton	1	0	1
Total	7	2	9

== Alpine skiing ==
Israel qualified one female and one male alpine skier through the basic quota.

Athlete	Event	Run 1		Run 2		Total	
Athlete	Event	Time	Rank	Time	Rank	Time	Rank
Barnabás Szőllős	Men's downhill	—N/a				1:57.03	30
Barnabás Szőllős	Men's super-G	—N/a				1:31.64	33
Barnabás Szőllős	Men's giant slalom	1:23.32	45	1:18.13	44	2:41.45	41
Barnabás Szőllős	Men's slalom	1:03.32	26	1:02.36	27	2:05.68	26
Noa Szőllős	Women's giant slalom	1:06.73	35	1:15.00	38	2:21.73	35
Noa Szőllős	Women's slalom	DNF					

== Bobsleigh ==
Israel national bobsleigh team qualified one sled in the two-man and four-man competitions. Adam Edelman finished 33rd overall in the world ranking and was designated as the first eligible athlete for quota reallocation. Israel received the quota following the reallocation of a spot that was declined by Great Britain. Ward Fawarsy was designated as a reserve athlete for the team.

The Olympic Committee of Israel decided to disqualify the team from further participation in the competition after it had already competed in the first two runs. The decision was made after Uri Zisman admitted to the head of the delegation that he had signed a false medical affidavit. The affidavit was intended to enable a substitution between him and Ward Fawarsy. The Israeli committee has reported the matter to the International Olympic Committee and will conduct a thorough investigation after the Games.

Athlete	Event	Run 1		Run 2		Run 3		Run 4		Total	
Athlete	Event	Time	Rank	Time	Rank	Time	Rank	Time	Rank	Time	Rank
Adam Edelman; Menachem Chen	Two-man	57.38	26	57.22	26	57.64	26	Did not advance		2:52.24	26
Adam Edelman; Menachem Chen; Uri Zisman; Omer Katz	Four-man	55.53	25	55.63	24	DNS		Did not advance		DNS	

== Cross-country skiing ==
Following the completion of the 2025–26 FIS Cross-Country World Cup in the first World Cup period (28 November – 14 December 2025), Israel qualified one male athlete.

Athlete	Event	Final		
Athlete	Event	Time	Deficit	Rank
Attila Mihály Kertész	Men's 10 kilometre freestyle	31:24.4	+10:48.2	110

== Figure skating ==
Mariia Seniuk secured one quota place for the Israeli delegation in the women's single event at the games after finish in the 16th place with 167.10 points at the 2025 World Figure Skating Championships in Boston, the United States.

Athlete	Event	SP/SD		FP/FD		Total	
Athlete	Event	Points	Rank	Points	Rank	Points	Rank
Mariia Seniuk	Women's singles	58.61	22 Q	94.00	24	152.61	24

== Skeleton ==
Israel qualified one sled in the men's competition based on the world ranking, with Jared Firestone finishing 36th overall.

Athlete	Event	Run 1		Run 2		Run 3		Run 4		Total	
Athlete	Event	Time	Rank	Time	Rank	Time	Rank	Time	Rank	Time	Rank
Jared Firestone	Men's	58.15	23	57.74	22	57.83	24	57.63	23	3:51:35	22

== See also ==
- Israel at the 2026 Winter Paralympics
