= Israel at the 2006 Winter Olympics =

- IOC code: ISR
- NOC: Olympic Committee of Israel
- Website: www.olympicsil.co.il (in Hebrew and English)

in Turin
- Competitors: 5 (3 men, 2 women) in 2 sports
- Flag bearers: Galit Chait (opening); Galit Chait (closing)
- Medals: Gold 0 Silver 0 Bronze 0 Total 0

Winter Olympics appearances (overview)
- 1994; 1998; 2002; 2006; 2010; 2014; 2018; 2022; 2026

Israel competed at the 2006 Winter Olympics in Turin, Italy.

Five Israeli athletes participated in the games, the same as in Salt Lake City in 2002, including two ice dance couples: Galit Chait and Sergei Sakhnovski, who were taking part for the third time in the Olympics, and the brother and sister team of Alexandra and Roman Zaretski for whom this was the first Olympics. The fifth member of the team was an alpine skier, Mikail Renzhin, the first Israeli to participate in this sport in the Olympics. He competed in the men's slalom and giant slalom events.

Galit Chait was the flag-bearer in the opening ceremony, as she was in 2002.

== Results by event ==
=== Alpine skiing ===
Athlete	Event	Run 1	Run 2	Total	Rank
Mykhaylo Renzhyn	Men's giant slalom	1:28.97	1:31.44	3:00.41	32
Mykhaylo Renzhyn	Men's slalom	1:01.83	58.90	2:00.73	37

=== Figure skating ===
Event	Athlete	CD		OD		FD		Total	
Event	Athlete	Points	Rank	Points	Rank	Points	Rank	Points	Rank
Ice dance	Galit Chait; Sergei Sakhnovski	31.07	13	55.65	6	94.44	7	181.16	8
Ice dance	Alexandra Zaretski; Roman Zaretski	23.51	24	41.21	23	71.08	20	135.80	22

Key: CD = Compulsory Dance, FD = Free Dance, FS = Free Skate, OD = Original Dance, SP = Short Program
