= Israel at the Olympics =

- IOC code: ISR
- NOC: Olympic Committee of Israel
- Website: www.olympicsil.co.il (in Hebrew and English)
- Medals Ranked 73rd: Gold 4 Silver 6 Bronze 10 Total 20

Summer appearances
- 1952; 1956; 1960; 1964; 1968; 1972; 1976; 1980; 1984; 1988; 1992; 1996; 2000; 2004; 2008; 2012; 2016; 2020; 2024; 2028

Winter appearances
- 1994; 1998; 2002; 2006; 2010; 2014; 2018; 2022; 2026

Israel has competed at the Olympic Games as a nation since 1952. Its National Olympic Committee was formed in 1933, during the British Mandate of Palestine. Israel has sent a team to each Summer Olympic Games since 1952 (except when it participated in the American-led boycott of the 1980 Summer Olympics), and to each Winter Olympic Games since 1994. Israel became a member of the European Olympic Committees (EOC) in 1994. At the 2024 Summer Olympics, Israel won seven Olympic medals, the most up until this point, breaking Israel's record for Olympic medals per Olympics.

== Medal tables ==
=== Medals by Summer Games ===
Games	Athletes	Gold	Silver	Bronze	Total	Rank
(Finland) 1952 Helsinki	25	0	0	0	0	–
(Australia) 1956 Melbourne	3	0	0	0	0	–
(Italy) 1960 Rome	23	0	0	0	0	–
(Japan) 1964 Tokyo	10	0	0	0	0	–
1968 Mexico City	29	0	0	0	0	–
(West Germany) 1972 Munich	15	0	0	0	0	–
(Canada) 1976 Montreal	26	0	0	0	0	–
(Soviet Union) 1980 Moscow	boycotted					
(United States) 1984 Los Angeles	32	0	0	0	0	–
(South Korea) 1988 Seoul	19	0	0	0	0	–
(Spain) 1992 Barcelona	30	0	1	1	2	48
(United States) 1996 Atlanta	25	0	0	1	1	71
(Australia) 2000 Sydney	39	0	0	1	1	71
(Greece) 2004 Athens	36	1	0	1	2	52
(China) 2008 Beijing	43	0	0	1	1	80
(United Kingdom) 2012 London	37	0	0	0	0	–
(Brazil) 2016 Rio de Janeiro	47	0	0	2	2	77
(Japan) 2020 Tokyo	90	2	0	2	4	39
(France) 2024 Paris	88	1	5	1	7	41
(United States) 2028 Los Angeles	future event					
(Australia) 2032 Brisbane	future event					
Total		4	6	10	20	73

=== Medals by Winter Games ===
Games	Athletes	Gold	Silver	Bronze	Total	Rank
(Norway) 1994 Lillehammer	1	0	0	0	0	–
(Japan) 1998 Nagano	3	0	0	0	0	–
(United States) 2002 Salt Lake City	5	0	0	0	0	–
(Italy) 2006 Turin	5	0	0	0	0	–
(Canada) 2010 Vancouver	3	0	0	0	0	–
(Russia) 2014 Sochi	5	0	0	0	0	–
(South Korea) 2018 Pyeongchang	10	0	0	0	0	–
(China) 2022 Beijing	6	0	0	0	0	–
(Italy) 2026 Milano Cortina	9	0	0	0	0	–
(France) 2030 French Alps	future event					
(United States) 2034 Utah	future event					
Total		0	0	0	0	–

=== Medals by summer sport ===
Sports	Gold	Silver	Bronze	Total	Rank
Gymnastics	2	2	0	4	30
Sailing	2	1	2	5	22
Judo	0	3	6	9	39
Canoeing	0	0	1	1	42
Taekwondo	0	0	1	1	39
Total	4	6	10	20	73

=== List of medalists ===
Games	Sport	Event	Medal	Name	Ref.
1992 Barcelona	Judo	Women's ‍–‍61 kg	Silver	Yael Arad	
1992 Barcelona	Judo	Men's ‍–‍71 kg	Bronze	Oren Smadja	
1996 Atlanta	Sailing	Men's Mistral One Design	Bronze	Gal Fridman	
2000 Sydney	Canoeing	Men's K-1 500 metres	Bronze	Michael Kolganov	
2004 Athens	Sailing	Men's Mistral One Design	Gold	Gal Fridman	
2004 Athens	Judo	Men's ‍–‍100 kg	Bronze	Ariel Ze'evi	
2008 Beijing	Sailing	Men's RS:X	Bronze	Shahar Tzuberi	
2016 Rio de Janeiro	Judo	Women's ‍–‍63 kg	Bronze	Yarden Gerbi	
2016 Rio de Janeiro	Judo	Men's +100 kg	Bronze	Or Sasson	
2020 Tokyo	Gymnastics	Men's floor	Gold	Artem Dolgopyat	
2020 Tokyo	Gymnastics	Women's rhythmic individual all-around	Gold	Linoy Ashram	
2020 Tokyo	Taekwondo	Women's ‍–‍49 kg	Bronze	Avishag Semberg	
2020 Tokyo	Judo	Mixed team	Bronze	Israel national judo team: Tohar Butbul; Raz Hershko; Li Kochman; Inbar Lanir; Sagi Muki; Shira Rishony; Baruch Shmailov; Timna Nelson-Levy; Peter Paltchik; Or Sasson; Gili Sharir	
2024 Paris	Sailing	Men's iQFoil	Gold	Tom Reuveny	
2024 Paris	Sailing	Women's iQFoil	Silver	Sharon Kantor	
2024 Paris	Gymnastics	Men's floor	Silver	Artem Dolgopyat	
2024 Paris	Gymnastics	Women's rhythmic group all-around	Silver	Ofir Shaham; Diana Svertsov; Adar Friedmann; Romi Paritzki; Shani Bakanov	
2024 Paris	Judo	Women's ‍–‍78 kg	Silver	Inbar Lanir	
2024 Paris	Judo	Women's +78 kg	Silver	Raz Hershko	
2024 Paris	Judo	Men's ‍–‍100 kg	Bronze	Peter Paltchik	

== History ==
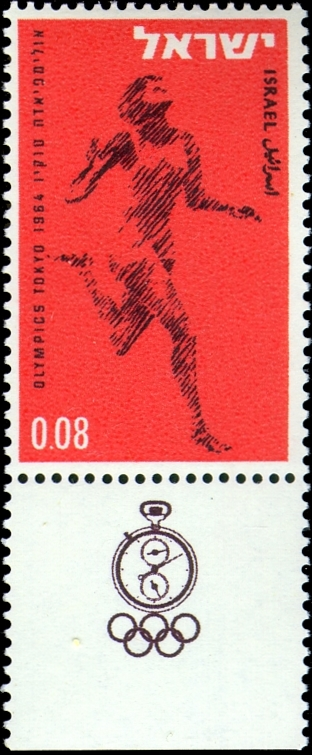
Israeli postal stamp, 1964

In 1933 the Palestine National Olympic Committee was officially formed, and was recognized by the International Olympic Committee in May 1934. It never competed as the 1936 games were held in Nazi Germany and were boycotted by this Jewish Olympic committee, while the 1940 and 1944 games were cancelled due to World War II. Although the Palestine National committee represented Muslims, Jews, and Christians living in British-ruled Mandatory Palestine, its rules stated that they "represent[ed] the Jewish National Home." In 1948, shortly after the State of Israel was established, its request to participate in the 1948 Olympics (symbolically represented by Raya Bronstein and Frieda Berson-Lichtblau) was denied, as Mandatory Palestine had ceased to exist and the newly formed State of Israel wasn't yet recognized by IOC. In 1951 the National Olympic Committee was re-organized and changed the name to the Olympic Committee of Israel, and was recognized by the International Olympic Committee in 1952.

Israel was previously part of the Asian Games Federation until it was disbanded in 1981. In 1982 instead of joining the new Olympic Council of Asia, Israel opted to join the European Olympic Committees.

=== Competing ===
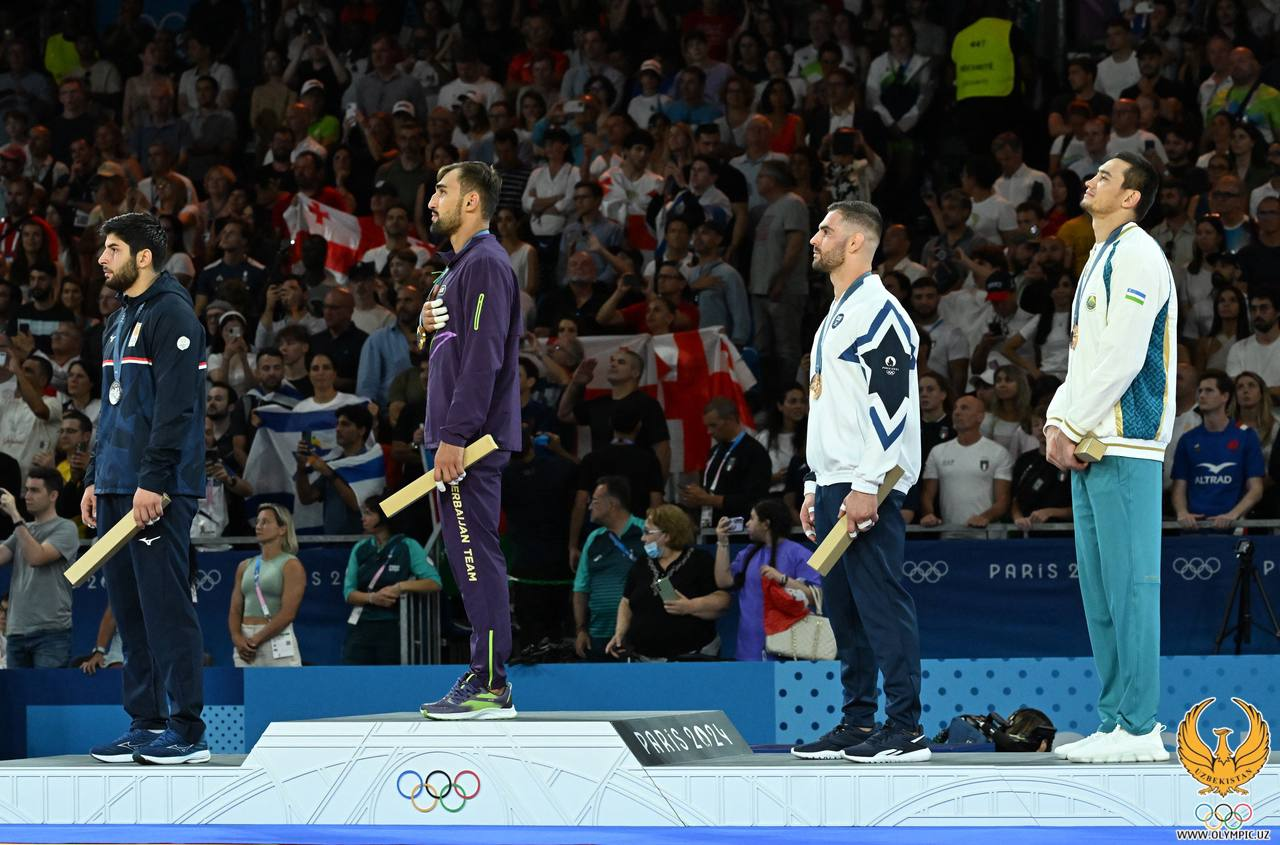
Israeli judoka Peter Paltchik at the 2024 Summer Olympics

Israel won its first Olympic medal in its tenth Olympic appearance, in 1992, in Judo when Yael Arad won a silver medal. She was followed a day later by another judoka, Oren Smadja, who won bronze. Since then, Israel won a bronze medal in five successive Summer Olympics until the streak ended in 2012. Additionally, in 2004, Gal Fridman became Israel's first gold medallist, in men's windsurfing. This was his second medal, following his bronze in 1996, and he became the first individual multi-medallist, followed in 2024 by Artem Dolgopyat. Israel also won 2 bronze medals in 2016. In the postponed 2020 Games Israel received 2 gold medals, won by Artem Dolgopyat in men's gymnastics (floor routine), and Linoy Ashram in women's rhythmic gymnastics (individual all-around), and 2 bronze medals, one won by Avishag Semberg in taekwondo, and 1 won by the judo Mixed team. As a member of the Israel national judo Mixed team, Ori Sasson became Israel's second multi-medalist, while the latter bronze one is a shared one. Through 2022, Israel has not won any medals in the Winter Olympics.

Ágnes Keleti, who immigrated to Israel in 1957, holds more medals than any other Israeli citizen. During the 1952 and 1956 Summer Olympics Ágnes won 10 medals competing for Hungary at the Olympics. The only Jew to hold more medals than Keleti is American swimmer Mark Spitz, who won 11.

Israel has been more successful at the Paralympic Games than at the Olympics, with 375 medals between 1960 and 2016.

== Conflicts with other nations ==
=== 1972 Summer Olympics ===
Eleven members of the Israeli Olympic team were murdered by the Black September Organization during the Munich massacre. The tragedy caused the Israeli delegation to withdraw from the remainder of the Games.

The murdered people were:

- David Berger, 28, weightlifter
- Ze'ev Friedman, 28, weightlifter
- Yossef Gutfreund, 40, wrestling referee
- Eliezer Halfin, 24, wrestler
- Yossef Romano, 32, weightlifter
- Amitzur Shapira, 40, track coach
- Kehat Shorr, 53, shooting coach
- Mark Slavin, 18, wrestler
- Andre Spitzer, 27, fencing coach
- Yakov Springer, 51, weightlifting judge
- Moshe Weinberg, 33, wrestling coach

On 3 August 2016, two days prior to the start of the 2016 Summer Olympics, the International Olympic Committee officially honored the Israelis killed for the first time. They were also honored during the Opening Ceremonies of the 2020 Summer Olympics.

=== 1980 Summer Olympics ===
Israel was one of the countries that boycotted the Moscow Olympics in protest at the Soviet invasion of Afghanistan, but also because of Soviet opposition to Israel and Zionism.

=== 2004 Summer Olympics ===
An Iranian judoka, Arash Miresmaeili, did not compete in a match against Israeli Ehud Vaks during the 2004 Summer Olympics, due to the government of Iran having taken steps to avoid any competition between its athletes and those from Israel. He was officially disqualified for being overweight, however Miresmaeli was awarded US$125,000 in prize money by the Iranian government, an amount paid to all Iranian gold medal winners. The International Judo Federation conducted an investigation to see if he intentionally came in overweight in order to miss the bout. He was officially cleared of intentionally avoiding the bout, but his receipt of the prize money raised suspicion.

=== 2016 Summer Olympics ===
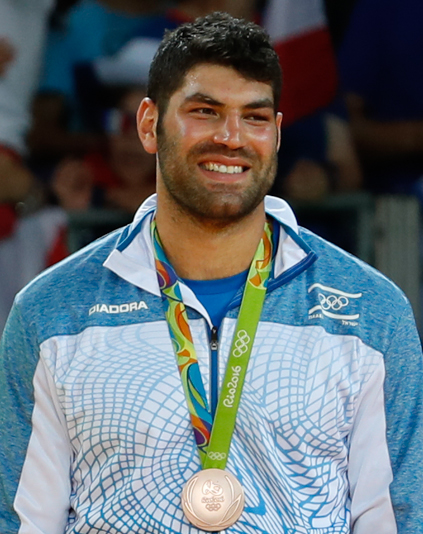
Israeli judoka Ori Sasson

Saudi Arabian judoka, Joud Fahmy, forfeited her match in the 2016 Summer Olympics possibly in order to avoid competing against Israeli Gili Cohen. Later in the 2016 Summer Olympics, Israeli Or Sasson defeated Egyptian judoka Islam El Shahaby in the first round, after the match ended, Sasson tried to shake his opponent's hand, but El Shahaby refused.

Prior to the 2016 opening ceremony, the Lebanese delegation was assigned to ride on the same bus as the Israeli delegation. The head of the Lebanese team, Salim al-Haj Nicolas, admitted that he demanded that the bus door be closed on the Israeli team, and that the Lebanese demanded that the Israeli athletes not board the bus. Udi Gal, an Israeli Olympic sailor, said his team ultimately decided to travel separately to avoid an "international and physical incident" but added "How could they let this happen on the eve of the Olympic Games? Isn't this the opposite of what the Olympics represents?"

=== 2024 Summer Olympics ===
Algerian Judoka Messaoud Dris missed weight in order to avoid facing Israeli judoka Tohar Butbul, leading to an investigation by the IOC.

Nurali Emomali of Tajikistan, as well as Abderrahmane Boushita from Morocco, refused the courtesy hand shake with their Israeli opponent, judoka Baruch Shmailov, following their matches, with Emomali reportedly yelling Allāhu ʾakbar.

== Olympic participants ==
=== Summer Olympics ===
Sport	1952	1956	1960	1964	1968	1972	1976	1984	1988	1992	1996	2000	2004	2008	2012	2016	2020	2024	Total
Archery																	1	2	3
Athletics	7	1	8	5	2	2	1	7		4	4	9	5	4	3	8	9	6	85
Badminton															1	1	2	1	5
Baseball																	24		24
Basketball	13																		13
Boxing								2	3		1								6
Canoeing/Kayaking								1			1	5	3	1					11
Cycling			2													2	2	4	10
Diving	1	1																	2
Equestrian																	4	4	8
Fencing			2			2	1	4		1	3	1	1	3				1	19
Football					19		17											19	55
Golf																1			1
Gymnastics			3				1	5	3	1		1	2	8	10	7	10	8	59
Judo							1	2		4	2	3	5	3	5	7	12	12	62
Sailing						2	1	5	4	5	5	6	6	7	7	6	5	8	67
Shooting	4		2	3	4	2	1		2	3	3	2	2	3	1	1	1	1	35
Surfing																	1	1	2
Swimming	1	1	4	2	6	1	2	3	1	5	4	11	4	9	7	9	13	18	101
Synchronized swimming															2	2	2	2	8
Table tennis													1						1
Taekwondo													1	1		1	1	1	5
Tennis								1	4	1			2	4	3	1			16
Triathlon																1	2	1	4
Weightlifting			2			3	1	1		3	1					1	1		13
Wrestling						3	1		2	4	1	3	3			1			18
Total	26	3	23	10	31	15	27	37	19	31	25	41	35	43	37	47	90	88	628

=== Winter Olympics ===
Sport	1994	1998	2002	2006	2010	2014	2018	2022	Total
Alpine Skiing				1	1	1	1	2	6
Figure Skating	1	3	4	4	2	3	7	3	27
Short Track Speed Skating			1			1	1	1	4
Skeleton							1		1
Total	1	3	5	5	3	5	10	6	38

== See also ==
- Israel at the Paralympics
- List of flag bearers for Israel at the Olympics
- Sport in Israel
- Jewish Olympics
- Antisemitism in the Olympic Games
- Boycotts of Israel in sports
