= Vladislav Bykanov =

Israeli short track speed skater

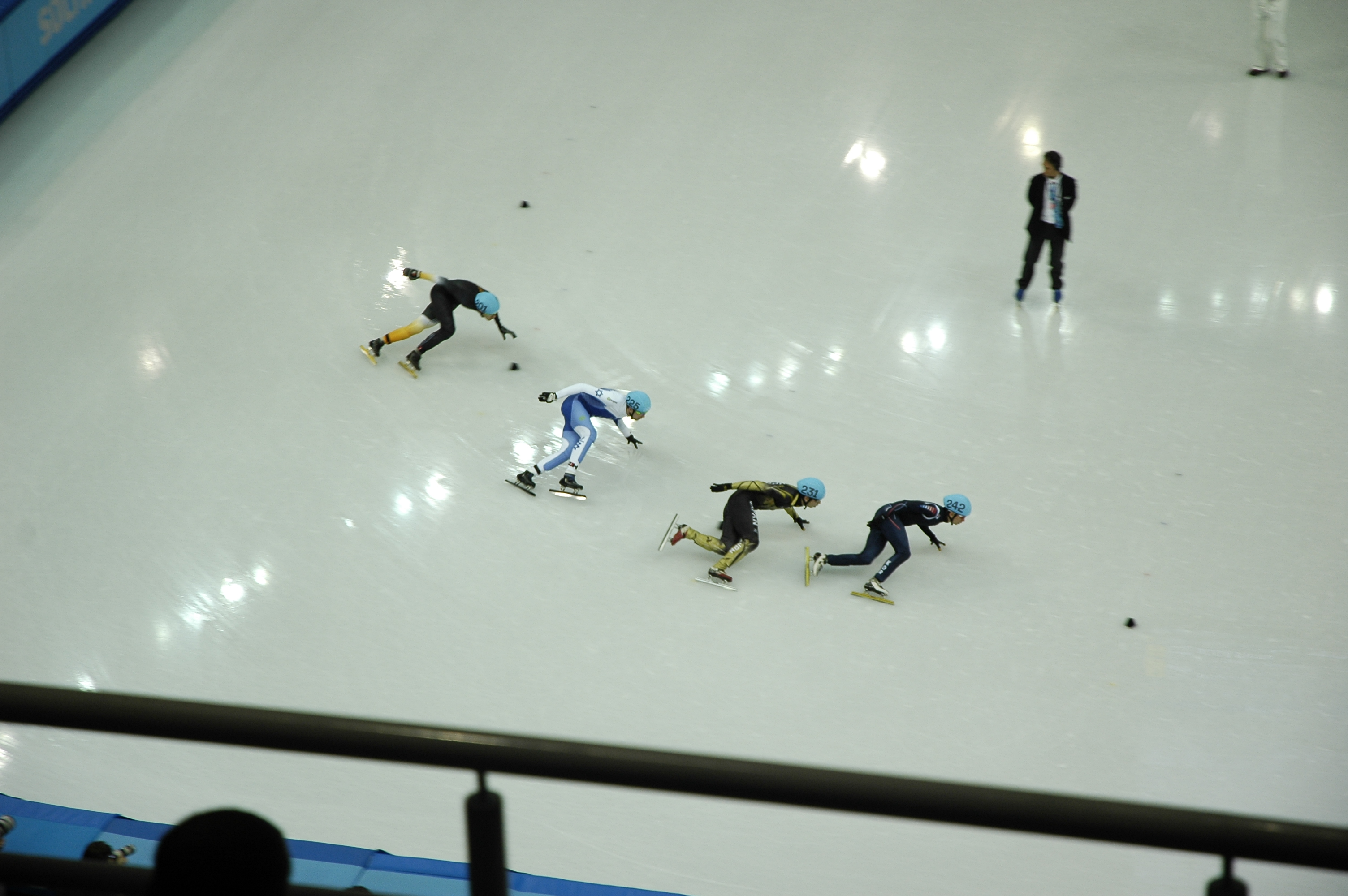
- Bykanov competing at the 2014 Winter Olympics

Personal information
- Native name: ולדיסלב ביקנוב
- Nickname: Vlad
- Born: 19 November 1989 (age 36) Lviv, Ukrainian SSR, URS
- Education: Open University of Israel
- Height: 1.86 m (6 ft 1 in)
- Weight: 80 kg (176 lb)

Sport
- Country: Israel
- Sport: Short Track Speed Skating
- Coached by: Jeroen Otter

Achievements and titles
- Personal bests: 500 meter 40.823 (15/3/14); 1,000 meter 1:23.251 (12/11/16); 1,500 meter 2:10.963 (5/11/16); 3,000 meter 4:54.151 (25/1/15)
Medal record
Short track speed skating
Representing Israel
European Championships
Gold medal – first place	2015 Dordrecht	3000 m SF
Gold medal – first place	2018 Dresden	3000 m SF
Silver medal – second place	2019 Dordrecht	3000 m SF
Silver medal – second place	2018 Dresden	Overall
Bronze medal – third place	2018 Dresden	1500 m
ISU Short Track Speed Skating World Cup
Gold medal – first place	Dordrecht 2016	Men's 1500m

Vladislav Bykanov (Hebrew: ולדיסלב ביקנוב, Ukrainian: Владислав Биканов; born 19 November 1989) is an Israeli Olympic short track speed skater. He won the gold medal in the 3,000m at the 2015 and 2018 European Championships. He competed for Israel at the 2014 and 2018 and 2022 Winter Olympics in Short Track Speed Skating.

== Early and personal life ==
Bykanov was born in Lviv, Ukraine, and is Jewish. He moved to Israel in 1994 and has lived there ever since. Bykanov lives in the northern Israeli city of Kiryat Shmona, and in Heerenveen, the Netherlands. He studied Economics and Management at Open University of Israel. His nickname is Vlad.

== Skating career ==
His coach is Jeroen Otter. Bykanov started skating when he was eight years old, in Northern Israel. In 2007, Bykanov broke an ankle and missed three months. In 2011 he again broke an ankle and missed four months. In 2015 he had hip surgery and was out for eight months; in 2016 he had another hip operation.

Bykanov qualified to compete for Israel at the 2014 Winter Olympics in Sochi, Russia, in all three individual races. By doing so, he became the first male athlete to qualify from Israel in short track speed skating. He was Israel's flag bearer at the opening ceremony. He came in 19th in the 500m, 24th in the 1,000m, and 25th in the 1,500m.

He had his best showing in the 500m in a World Championship in the 2014 World Championship in Montreal, coming in 13th. Bykanov had his other best World Championship showings in the 2016 World Championship in Seoul, coming in 13th in the 1,000m, 15th in the 1,500m, and 15th overall.

Bykanov became the first Israeli short track skater to finish in the top three at the European Championships when he won the gold medal in the 3,000m super final in 2015 in Dordrecht, Netherlands, with a time of 5 minutes 2.882 seconds, ahead of Thibaut Fauconnet of France. At the 2017 European Championships, he won a bronze medal in the 1,500m.

At the January 2018 European Championships in Dresden, Germany, Bykanov won the gold medal in the 3,000m, the silver medal in the Overall competition, and the bronze medal in the 1,500m. He also came in 5th in the 500m, and 21st in the 1,000m.

Bykanov competed for Israel at the 2018 Winter Olympics in Short Track Speed Skating in Pyeongchang, South Korea.

He will compete for Israel at the 2022 Winter Olympics.

== Personal records ==
Distance	Nation	City	Date	Record Time
500 meters	Canada	Montreal	15 March 2014	40.823
1000 meters	United States	Salt Lake City	12 November 2016	1:23.251
1500 meters	Canada	Calgary	5 November 2016	2:10.963
3000 meters	Netherlands	Dordrecht	25 January 2015	4:54.151
