= Michael Shmerkin =

Israeli figure skater

Personal information
- Native name: מיכאל "מישה" שמרקין
- Born: 5 February 1970 (age 56) Odesa, Ukrainian SSR, Soviet Union
- Height: 1.68 m (5 ft 6 in)

Figure skating career
- Country: Israel
- Skating club: Canada Centre, Metulla, ISR
- Retired: 2002

Michael "Misha" Shmerkin (Hebrew: מיכאל "מישה" שמרקין; born 5 February 1970) is an Israeli former competitive figure skater. He is a two-time Skate Canada International silver medalist (1994 and 1995), 1993 Ondrej Nepela Memorial champion, and 1995 Skate Israel champion. He competed in the final segment at two Winter Olympics (1994, 1998), six World Championships, and four European Championships. He is currently a figure skating teacher/coach for many young adults and children . He is located in Brooklyn and Staten Island, New York. He was the first Israeli ever to compete in the Winter Olympics.

== Career ==
Early in his career, Shmerkin competed internationally for the Soviet Union, most notably at the 1984 World Junior Championships, where he placed fifth.

Shmerkin moved with his family to Israel in 1991, and Shmerkin began representing his new country in international competition.

At the 1994 Winter Olympics, where he placed 16th, Shmerkin became the first athlete of any discipline to represent Israel at the Winter Olympic Games. He placed 18th at the 1998 Winter Olympics.

In the late 1990s he skated to Jewish songs and had a tallis and menorah embroidered on his costume.

He retired from competitive skating following the 2001/2002 season.

Shmerkin currently coaches in New York.

== Programs ==
Season	Short program	Free skating
2000–2002	Russian gypsy dance	Swing

== Competitive highlights ==
GP: Champions Series (Grand Prix)

International
Event	88–89 (URS)	90–91 (URS)	91–92 (ISR)	92–93 (ISR)	93–94 (ISR)	94–95 (ISR)	95–96 (ISR)	96–97 (ISR)	97–98 (ISR)	98–99 (ISR)	99–00 (ISR)	00–01 (ISR)	01–02 (ISR)
Olympics					16th				18th				
Worlds				19th	14th	11th	11th	15th	15th		35th	33rd	
Europeans								14th	13th		19th	20th	25th
GP Nations Cup							6th	8th					
GP NHK Trophy								10th					
GP Skate Canada						2nd	2nd						
Golden Spin												8th	5th
Moscow News	9th	2nd											
Nations Cup						5th							
Nepela Memorial					1st								
NHK Trophy						5th							
Piruetten					6th								
Skate America						7th							
Skate Canada						2nd							
Skate Israel							1st		2nd		8th	3rd	
National
Israeli Champ.			1st	1st	1st	1st	1st	1st	1st		1st	1st	1st
Soviet Champ.	5th												

== See also ==
- List of select Jewish figure skaters
