= Olympic Committee of Israel =

National Olympic Committee

Coordinates: 32°6′24.59″N 34°48′55.76″E

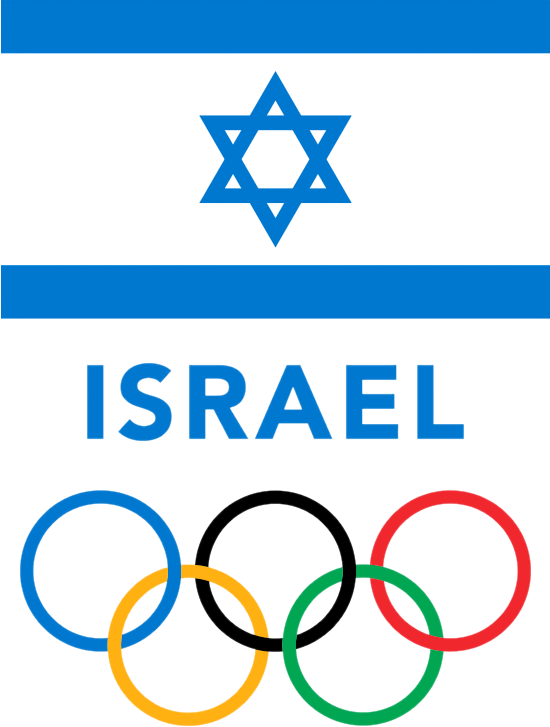
- Country: Israel
- Code: ISR
- Created: 1933
- Recognized: 1952
- Continental Association: EOC
- Headquarters: Tel Aviv, Israel
- President: Yael Arad
- Secretary General: Gilad Lustig
- Website: www.olympicsil.co.il

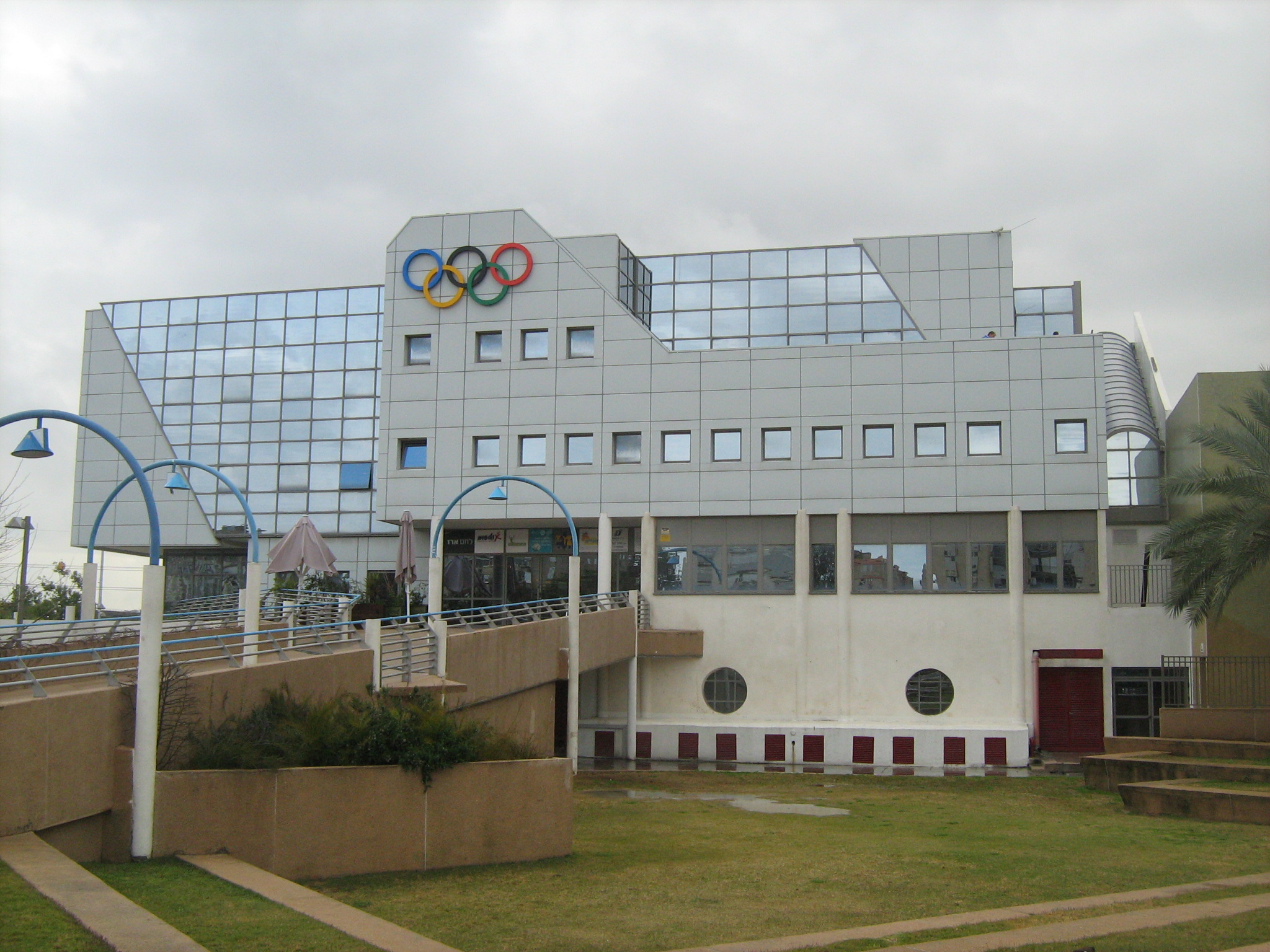
The Olympic Committee of Israel building in the National Sport Center – Tel Aviv

The Olympic Committee of Israel (Hebrew: הוועד האולימפי בישראל; Arabic: اللجنة الأولمبية الإسرائيلية; IOC Code: ISR) is the recognized National Olympic Committee (NOC) of Israel, and the governing body of Olympic sports in Israel. The OCI's headquarters is located at the National Sport Center – Tel Aviv.

== History ==
In 1933 the Palestine National Olympic Committee was officially formed, and was recognized by the International Olympic Committee in May 1934, but never competed. Although this committee represented Jews, Christians and Muslims living in Mandatory Palestine, its rules stated that they "represent[ed] the Jewish National Home." It was, however, controlled exclusively by the Maccabi sports organization and oversaw only clubs affiliated with Maccabi, while neither rival Jewish sports organizations, such as Hapoel, nor non-Jewish sports organizations took part.

Although Palestine was formally invited to participate in the 1936 Olympics in Berlin, it declined the invitation to attend the Games in Nazi Germany. In 1948, shortly after the State of Israel was established, its request to participate in the 1948 Olympics was denied, as the newly formed country wasn't yet recognized by IOC.

== OCI recognition ==
The OCI was re-organized in 1951 under joint-leadership of Maccabi and Hapoel, the two major sports organization in the country. According to the agreement of the two organizations, there were two presidents, one from each. This arrangement continued until 1967, and since then OCI has only one president.

OCI achieved IOC recognition in early 1952, just in time for Israel's Olympic debut at the 1952 Summer Olympics in Helsinki. OCI has sent delegations to all Summer Olympics since then, except for Moscow 1980, which Israel supported the United States in a boycott over the Soviet invasion of Afghanistan. Israel made its debut at the Winter Olympics in 1994, and has become a regular participant since then.

== Continental association ==
Between 1954 and 1974 Israel took part in the Asian Games, but political pressure exerted by Arab countries due to the Arab–Israeli conflict led to Israel's exclusion from the re-organized Olympic Council of Asia in 1981. In the early 1990s Israel was admitted into European sports organizations, and became full member of European Olympic Committees in 1994. Israel has participated in the biannual European Youth Olympic Festival, since 1995, and the European Games since 2015.

== See also ==
- Israel at the Olympics
- Munich massacre
