= Figure skating at the 2018 Winter Olympics – Qualification =

The number of entries for the figure skating events at the Winter Olympics is determined by quotas set by the International Olympic Committee. A total of 148 quota spots were available to athletes to compete in the figure skating events at the 2018 Winter Olympics. There were 30 spots allotted each in men's and women's singles, 20 in pair skating, and 24 in ice dance. Additionally, ten nations qualified for the team event. There is no individual athlete qualification to the Olympics; the choice of whom to send is at the discretion of each country's National Olympic Committee. Each National Olympic Committee could enter up to 18 skaters total, with a maximum of nine men or nine women. Japan and the United States ultimately earned three quota spots each in the men's event; Canada, Russia, and the United States earned three quota spots each in the women's event; Canada, China, and Russia earned three quota spots in the pairs' event; and Canada and the United States earned three quota spots each in the ice dance event.

== Qualification of nations ==
Countries were able to qualify entries to the 2018 Winter Olympics in two ways. Most spots were allocated based on the results of the 2017 World Figure Skating Championships. There, countries were able to qualify up to three entries in each discipline according to a predetermined system. The results of the 2017 World Championships determined 83 total spots: 24 entries each in men's and women's singles, 16 in pairs, and 19 in ice dance.

The remainder of the spots were filled at the 2017 Nebelhorn Trophy in late September 2017. Countries that had already earned an entry to the Olympics were not allowed to qualify additional entries at this final qualifying competition. However, if a country earned two or three spots at the World Championships, but did not have two or three skaters, respectively, qualify for the free skate, then they were allowed to send a skater who did not reach the free segment at World Championships to the Nebelhorn Trophy to qualify the remaining spot(s). Unlike at the World Championships, where countries could qualify more than one spot depending on the placement of their skater(s), at the Nebelhorn Trophy, countries could earn only one spot per discipline, regardless of ranking.

Initially, a total of six spots per singles event, four spots in pairs, and five in ice dance were available at the Nebelhorn Trophy. According to guidelines established by the International Skating Union (ISU), nations had to select skaters and teams who had achieved a minimum Total Elements Score at an ISU-recognized international competition on or before 29 January 2018.

For the team event, scores from the 2016 World Figure Skating Championships and the 2017–18 Grand Prix of Figure Skating season were tabulated to establish the top ten nations. Each nation compiled a score from their top performers in each of the four disciplines. The 2017 Grand Prix of Figure Skating Final was the final event to affect the team event score.

== Qualified nations ==
Number of qualified skaters or teams per nation
Nations	Men's singles	Women's singles	Pairs	Ice dance	Team event	Add.	Total
Australia	1	1	1	0			4
Austria	0	0	1	0			2
Belgium	1	1	0	0			2
Brazil	0	1	0	0			1
Canada	2	3	3	3	Yes		17
China	2	1	3	1	Yes		11
Czech Republic	1	0	1	1			5
Finland	0	1	0	0			1
France	1	1	1	2	Yes		8
Georgia	1	0	0	0			1
Germany	1	1	2	1	Yes		8
Great Britain	0	0	0	1			2
Hungary	0	1	0	0			1
Israel	2	0	1	1	Yes	1 (Note: Aimee Buchanan of Israel competed in the team event, but not the women's individual event.)	7
Italy	1	2	2	2	Yes		11
Japan	3	2	1	1	Yes		9
Kazakhstan	1	2	0	0			3
Latvia	1	1	0	0			2
Malaysia	1	0	0	0			1
North Korea	0	0	1	0			2
Philippines	1	0	0	0			1
Poland	0	0	0	1			2
Olympic Athletes from Russia	2	3	3	2	Yes		15
Slovakia	0	1	0	1			3
South Korea	1	2	1	1	Yes		7
Spain	2	0	0	1			4
Sweden	0	1	0	0			1
Switzerland	0	1	0	0			1
Turkey	0	0	0	1			2
Ukraine	1	1	0	1			4
United States	3	3	1	3	Yes		14
Uzbekistan	1	0	0	0			1
Total: 32 NOCs	30	30	22 teams	24 teams	10 teams	1	153

== Qualification summary ==
=== Men's singles ===
Twenty-four quota spots in the men's event were awarded based on the results at the 2017 World Figure Skating Championships. An additional six quota spots were earned at the 2017 Nebelhorn Trophy. This was the first time that Malaysia had ever qualified for a figure skating event at the Winter Olympics; Julian Yee also served as the country's flag bearer.

While Alexander Majorov earned an Olympic spot for Sweden by finishing third at the Nebelhorn Trophy, the Swedish Olympic Committee declined to send him to the Olympics, as he did not meet their prescribed standards. The Swedish Olympic Committee had required that Majorov finish within the top eight at an international competition and did not count his seventh-place finish at the 2018 European Figure Skating Championships, because it was not a truly international event. That quota spot was re-allocated to the Philippines, who chose to send Michael Christian Martinez.

Qualifying nations in men's singles
Event	Skaters per NOC	Qualifying NOCs	Total skaters
2017 World Championships	3	Japan; United States	24
2017 World Championships	2	China; Spain; Canada (International Olympic Committee) OAR; Israel	24
2017 World Championships	1	Uzbekistan; Georgia; Latvia; Australia; Kazakhstan; France; Czech Republic; Germany	24
2017 Nebelhorn Trophy	1	Belgium; ~~Sweden~~; Italy; South Korea; Malaysia; Ukraine; Philippines	6
Total			**30**

=== Women's singles ===
Twenty-four quota spots in the women's event were awarded based on the results at the 2017 World Championships. An additional six quota spots were earned at the 2017 Nebelhorn Trophy.

Qualifying nations in women's singles
Event	Skaters per NOC	Qualifying NOCs	Total skaters
2017 World Championships	3	(International Olympic Committee) OAR; Canada; United States	24
2017 World Championships	2	Japan; Italy; Kazakhstan; South Korea	24
2017 World Championships	1	China; Belgium; Slovakia; France; Germany; Hungary; Latvia	24
2017 Nebelhorn Trophy	1	Australia; Sweden; Switzerland; Brazil; Finland; Ukraine	6
Total			**30**

=== Pairs ===
Sixteen quota spots in the pairs' event were awarded based on results at the 2017 World Championships. France had originally qualified two quota spots in pair skating at the 2017 World Championships; however, they relinquished one of their spots. The extra quota spot was made available at the 2017 Nebelhorn Trophy along with the other four spots originally allocated.

Although South Korea did not qualify a pairs team through the normal process, as the host nation, they were still able to enter a team in the 2018 Winter Olympics. North Korea originally qualified one quota spot in pair skating after Ryom Tae-ok and Kim Ju-sik finished in sixth place at the 2017 Nebelhorn Trophy. However, after North Korea missed the deadline to submit their entries for the Olympics, their spot was re-allocated to Japan. Following negotiations with South Korea – the first in more than two years – North Korea agreed to "actively cooperate" at the Olympics. and on 20 January, the International Olympic Committee (IOC) announced that, as part of the "Olympic Korean Peninsula Declaration", they had granted accreditation to North Korea for twenty-two athletes to compete at the Olympics and allocated an additional quota spot in pair skating for Ryom and Kim. In addition, the IOC approved the request of the North and South Korean Olympic committees to allow the two delegations to enter the arena together under the name "Korea" during the opening ceremony. Thomas Bach, then-president of the IOC, stated: "The Olympic spirit is about respect, dialogue and understanding. The Olympic Winter Games PyeongChang 2018 are hopefully opening the door to a brighter future on the Korean Peninsula, and inviting the world to join in a celebration of hope."

Qualifying nations in pairs
Event	Teams per NOC	Qualifying NOCs	Total teams
2017 World Championships	3	China (International Olympic Committee) OAR; Canada	15
2017 World Championships	2	Germany; ~~France~~; Italy	15
2017 World Championships	1	France; United States	15
2017 Nebelhorn Trophy	1	Australia; Austria; ~~North Korea~~; Israel; Czech Republic; Japan	5
Host nation privilege	1	South Korea	1
"Olympic Korean Peninsula Declaration"	1	North Korea	1
Total			**22**

=== Ice dance ===
Nineteen quota spots in the ice dance event were awarded based on results at the 2017 World Championships. Denmark had originally qualified one quota spot in ice dance at the 2017 World Championships; however, they relinquished their spot when Laurence Fournier Beaudry was unable to obtain Danish citizenship. The extra quota spot was made available at the 2017 Nebelhorn Trophy along with the other five slots originally allocated.

Qualifying nations in ice dance
Event	Teams per NOC	Qualifying NOCs	Total teams
2017 World Championships	3	Canada; United States	18
2017 World Championships	2	France (International Olympic Committee) OAR; Italy	18
2017 World Championships	1	Israel; ~~Denmark~~; Poland; Ukraine; China; Turkey; Spain	18
2017 Nebelhorn Trophy	1	Great Britain; Japan; Germany; South Korea; Czech Republic; Slovakia	6
Total			**24**

=== Team event ===
In order for a nation to qualify for the team event, it had to have qualified entrants in at least three of the four disciplines (men's singles, women's singles, pair skating, or ice dance). If there were not ten nations that had qualified entrants in all four disciplines, nations with three entrants could use an additional athlete quota to fill their team. These additional athletes were eligible to compete in the team event, but not in the individual Olympic events. The nations which qualified for the team event at the 2022 Winter Olympics are identified with a green check mark ( ✓) in the last column.

Qualification for figure skating team event
Pl.	Nation	M	W	P	D	Total	(International Olympic Committee)
1	Canada	Yes	Yes	Yes	Yes	6084	Yes
2	(International Olympic Committee) OAR	Yes	Yes	Yes	Yes	5924	Yes
3	United States	Yes	Yes	Yes	Yes	5055	Yes
4	Japan	Yes	Yes	Yes	Yes	4345	Yes
5	China	Yes	Yes	Yes	Yes	4231	Yes
6	Italy	Yes	Yes	Yes	Yes	3801	Yes
7	France	Yes	Yes	Yes	Yes	3652	Yes
8	Germany	Yes	Yes	Yes	Yes	2806	Yes
9	Spain	Yes	No	No	Yes	1858	No
10	Israel	Yes	(Note: Although Israel did not qualify a women's singles skater for the team event, they were able to use the Additional Athletes Quota to complete their team.)	Yes	Yes	1521	Yes
11	South Korea	Yes	Yes	(Note: Although South Korea did not qualify a pair skating team through the normal process, as the host nation, they were able to enter a team in the 2018 Winter Olympics.)	Yes	1397	Yes

=== Top four NOCs on waitlist per discipline ===
If a country rejected a quota spot, then the additional quota became available. A country could be eligible for one quota spot per event in the reallocation process. The following list was compiled after the remaining spots were allocated at the 2017 Nebelhorn Trophy. Countries marked in bold with a ● accepted a reallocated quota.

Quota spot waitlist
Men's singles	Women's singles	Pairs	Ice dance
**Philippines ●** Switzerland; Great Britain; Poland	Armenia; Singapore; Chinese Taipei; Philippines	**Japan ●** Belarus; Spain; Great Britain	Lithuania; Armenia; Finland; Belarus
