= List of flag bearers for Malaysia at the Olympics =

Malaysia at the Olympics
- IOC code: MAS
- NOC: Olympic Council of Malaysia
- Website: www.olympic.org.my (in English)
- Medals: Gold 0 Silver 8 Bronze 7 Total 15

Summer appearances
- 1956; 1960; 1964; 1968; 1972; 1976; 1980; 1984; 1988; 1992; 1996; 2000; 2004; 2008; 2012; 2016; 2020; 2024; 2028

Winter appearances
- 2018; 2022; 2026

Other related appearances
- North Borneo (1956)

Below is a list of flag bearers who have represented Malaysia at the Olympics.

Flag bearers carry the national flag of their country at the opening ceremony of the Olympic Games.

#	Event year	Season	Flag bearer	Sport
1	1964	Summer	Kuda Ditta	Athletics
2	1968	Summer	Nashatar Singh Sidhu	Athletics
3	1972	Summer	Ali Bakar	Football
4	1976	Summer	Ahmed Ishtiaq Mubarak	Athletics
5	1984	Summer	Sabiahmad Abdullah Ahad	Shooting
6	1988	Summer	Nordin Mohamed Jadi	Athletics
7	1992	Summer	Razif Sidek	Badminton
8	1996	Summer	Nor Saiful Zaini Nasir-ud-Din	Field hockey
9	2000	Summer	Mirnawan Nawawi	Field hockey
10	2004	Summer	Bryan Nickson Lomas	Diving
11	2008	Summer	Mohd Azizulhasni Awang	Cycling
12	2012	Summer	Pandelela Rinong	Diving
13	2016	Summer	Lee Chong Wei	Badminton
14	2018	Winter	Julian Yee	Figure skating
15	2020	Summer	Goh Liu Ying	Badminton
15	2020	Summer	Lee Zii Jia	Badminton
16	2022	Winter	Aruwin Salehhuddin	Alpine skiing
16	2022	Winter	Jeffrey Webb	Alpine skiing
17	2024	Summer	Nur Shazrin Mohd Latif	Sailing
17	2024	Summer	Bertrand Rhodict Lises	Diving
18	2026	Winter	Aruwin Salehhuddin	Alpine skiing

== See also ==
- Malaysia at the Olympics
