= 2022 Winter Olympics Parade of Nations =

Parade of Nations during the opening ceremony of the XXIV Winter Olympiad

During the Parade of Nations within the Beijing 2022 Winter Olympics opening ceremony on February 4, athletes and officials from each participating country marched in the Beijing National Stadium preceded by their flag and placard bearer bearing the respective country's name. Each flag bearer was chosen either by the nation's National Olympic Committee or by the team of athletes themselves.

== Parade order ==
By tradition, Greece entered first as the originator of the Olympics, and China entered last as host. Per a new rule introduced by the International Olympic Committee at the 2020 Summer Olympics, Italy entered second-to-last as the upcoming host of the 2026 Winter Olympics. All nations in between entered in the collation order of the host nation's language, Mandarin, in Simplified Chinese.

As part of sanctions due to the Russian doping scandal, Russia was not allowed to directly use its name or flag, and entered under the acronym "ROC" after the Russian Olympic Committee and its flag.

Announcers in the stadium read off the names of the marching nations in Mandarin Chinese (the official language of the host country), English, and French (the official languages of the Olympics) with music accompanying the athletes as they marched into the stadium.

According to the current version of the Olympic Charter, during those Games, each nation had the option of having two flag bearers (a man and a woman) in an effort to promote gender equality.

=== Sort order ===
As Chinese characters do not have an alphabetical order, they were sorted based on stroke count. Specifically:

- Characters with fewer strokes march earlier, so San Marino (圣马力诺) marched before Kyrgyzstan (吉尔吉斯斯坦) because 圣 has 5 strokes and 吉 has 6 strokes.
- If the initial characters have the same number of strokes, then the stroke orders of the two characters are grouped in the order 橫竖撇捺折 (horizontal/vertical/left falling/right falling/fold). For example, Denmark (丹麦) marched before Brazil (巴西) because 丹 has four strokes in the order ㇓㇆㇔㇐ (3541), while 巴 has four strokes in the order ㇕丨㇐㇟ (5215).
  - The second characters are not compared, even though 麦 has more strokes than 西.
- While it is possible to have a pair of characters with the same stroke count and the same stroke order groups, this did not occur during the parade. If the initial characters are identical, the second characters of each nation are used, and so on.

== List ==
The following is a list of each country's flag bearer. The list is sorted by the sequence that each nation appeared in the Parade of Nations. The names are given in their official designations by the IOC, and the Chinese names follow their official designations by the Beijing Organizing Committee for the 2022 Olympic and Paralympic Winter Games.

Order	Nation	Chinese name	Pinyin	Flag bearer	Sport/Function	Ref.
1	Greece	希腊	Xīlà	Apostolos Angelis	Cross-country skiing	
1	Greece	希腊	Xīlà	Maria Ntanou	Cross-country skiing	
2	Turkey	土耳其	Tǔěrqí	Furkan Akar	Short track speed skating	
2	Turkey	土耳其	Tǔěrqí	Aysenur Duman	Cross-country skiing	
3	Malta	马耳他	Mǎěrtā	Jenise Spiteri	Snowboarding	
4	Madagascar	马达加斯加	Mǎdájiāsījiā	Mialitiana Clerc	Alpine skiing	
4	Madagascar	马达加斯加	Mǎdájiāsījiā	Mathieu Neumuller	Alpine skiing	
5	Malaysia	马来西亚	Mǎláixīyà	Aruwin Salehhuddin	Alpine skiing	
5	Malaysia	马来西亚	Mǎláixīyà	Jeffrey Webb	Alpine skiing	
6	Ecuador	厄瓜多尔	Èguāduōěr	Sarah Escobar	Alpine skiing	
7	Eritrea	厄立特里亚	Èlìtélǐyà	Shannon-Ogbnai Abeda	Alpine skiing	
8	Jamaica	牙买加	Yámǎijiā	Benjamin Alexander	Alpine skiing	
8	Jamaica	牙买加	Yámǎijiā	Jazmine Fenlator-Victorian	Bobsleigh	
9	Belgium	比利时	Bǐlìshí	Loena Hendrickx	Figure skating	
9	Belgium	比利时	Bǐlìshí	Armand Marchant	Alpine skiing	
10	Japan	日本	Rìběn	Arisa Go	Speed skating	
10	Japan	日本	Rìběn	Akito Watabe	Nordic combined	
11	Chinese Taipei	中华台北	Zhōnghuá Táiběi	Huang Yu-ting	Speed skating	
11	Chinese Taipei	中华台北	Zhōnghuá Táiběi	Ho Ping-jui	Alpine skiing	
12	Hong Kong, China	中国香港	Zhōngguó Xiānggǎng	Sidney Chu	Short track speed skating	
13	Denmark	丹麦	Dānmài	Madeleine Dupont	Curling	
13	Denmark	丹麦	Dānmài	Frans Nielsen	Ice hockey	
14	Ukraine	乌克兰	Wūkèlán	Oleksandr Abramenko	Freestyle skiing	
14	Ukraine	乌克兰	Wūkèlán	Oleksandra Nazarova	Figure skating	
15	Uzbekistan	乌兹别克斯坦	Wūzībiékèsītǎn	Komiljon Tukhtaev	Alpine skiing	
16	Brazil	巴西	Bāxī	Edson Bindilatti	Bobsleigh	
16	Brazil	巴西	Bāxī	Jaqueline Mourão	Cross-country skiing	
17	Pakistan	巴基斯坦	Bājīsītǎn	Muhammad Karim	Alpine skiing	
18	Israel	以色列	Yǐsèliè	Evgeni Krasnopolski	Figure skating	
18	Israel	以色列	Yǐsèliè	Noa Szollos	Alpine skiing	
19	Democratic Republic of Timor-Leste	东帝汶	Dōngdìwèn	Yohan Goutt Gonçalves	Alpine skiing	
20	North Macedonia	北马其顿	Běimǎqídùn	Dardan Dehari	Alpine skiing	
21	Luxembourg	卢森堡	Lúsēnbǎo	Matthieu Osch	Alpine skiing	
21	Luxembourg	卢森堡	Lúsēnbǎo	Gwyneth ten Raa	Alpine skiing	
22	Belarus	白俄罗斯	Báiéluósī	Ignat Golovatsiuk	Speed skating	
22	Belarus	白俄罗斯	Báiéluósī	Hanna Nifantava	Speed skating	
23	India	印度	Yìndù	Arif Khan	Alpine skiing	
24	Lithuania	立陶宛	Lìtáowǎn	Deividas Kizala	Figure skating	
24	Lithuania	立陶宛	Lìtáowǎn	Paulina Ramanauskaitė	Figure skating	
25	Nigeria	尼日利亚	Nírìlìyà	Seun Adigun (Note: Adigun represented Nigeria at the 2018 Winter Olympics in bobsleigh, and was the official team doctor for these games.)	Team official	
26	Ghana	加纳	Jiānà	Carlos Mäder	Alpine skiing	
27	Canada	加拿大	Jiānádà	Charles Hamelin	Short track speed skating	
27	Canada	加拿大	Jiānádà	Marie-Philip Poulin	Ice hockey	
28	San Marino	圣马力诺	Shèng Mǎlìnuò	Matteo Gatti	Alpine skiing	
28	San Marino	圣马力诺	Shèng Mǎlìnuò	Anna Torsani	Alpine skiing	
29	Kyrgyzstan	吉尔吉斯斯坦	Jíěrjísīsītǎn	Maksim Gordeev	Alpine skiing	
30	Armenia	亚美尼亚	Yàměiníyà	Tina Garabedian	Figure skating	
30	Armenia	亚美尼亚	Yàměiníyà	Mikayel Mikayelyan	Cross-country skiing	
31	Spain	西班牙	Xībānyá	Queralt Castellet	Snowboarding	
31	Spain	西班牙	Xībānyá	Ander Mirambell	Skeleton	
32	Liechtenstein	列支敦士登	Lièzhīdūnshìdēng	Stefan Marxer	Team official	
33	Islamic Republic of Iran	伊朗	Yīlǎng	Atefeh Ahmadi	Alpine skiing	
33	Islamic Republic of Iran	伊朗	Yīlǎng	Hossein Saveh-Shemshaki	Alpine skiing	
34	Hungary	匈牙利	Xiōngyálì	Zita Tóth	Alpine skiing	
34	Hungary	匈牙利	Xiōngyálì	Márton Kékesi	Alpine skiing	
35	Iceland	冰岛	Bīngdǎo	Kristrún Guðnadóttir	Cross-country skiing	
35	Iceland	冰岛	Bīngdǎo	Sturla Snær Snorrason	Alpine skiing	
36	Andorra	安道尔	Āndàoěr	Maeva Estevez	Snowboarding	
37	Finland	芬兰	Fēnlán	Valtteri Filppula	Ice hockey	
38	Croatia	克罗地亚	Kèluódìyà	Zrinka Ljutić	Alpine skiing	
38	Croatia	克罗地亚	Kèluódìyà	Marko Skender	Cross-country skiing	
39	Saudi Arabia	沙特	Shātè	Fayik Abdi	Alpine skiing	
40	Albania	阿尔巴尼亚	Āěrbāníyà	Denni Xhepa	Alpine skiing	
41	Argentina	阿根廷	Āgēntíng	Francesca Baruzzi	Alpine skiing	
41	Argentina	阿根廷	Āgēntíng	Franco Dal Farra	Cross-country skiing	
42	Azerbaijan	阿塞拜疆	Āsāibàijiāng	Vladimir Litvintsev	Figure skating	
43	Latvia	拉脱维亚	Lātuōwéiyà	Elīza Tīruma	Luge	
43	Latvia	拉脱维亚	Lātuōwéiyà	Lauris Dārziņš	Ice hockey	
44	Great Britain	英国	Yīngguó	Eve Muirhead	Curling	
44	Great Britain	英国	Yīngguó	Dave Ryding	Alpine skiing	
45	Romania	罗马尼亚	Luōmǎníyà	Raluca Strămăturaru	Luge	
45	Romania	罗马尼亚	Luōmǎníyà	Paul Pepene	Cross-country skiing	
46	ROC (Note: The delegation competed under the flag of the Russian Olympic Committee.)	ROC (Note: ROC is sorted under a Chinese transcription of its English abbreviation, 罗克 (Luōkè). No Chinese name was displayed on the placard. During the Parade of Nations, the ROC was announced in French, English, and Chinese as "Comité olympique russe," "Russian Olympic Committee," and "俄罗斯奥林匹克委员会" (Èluósī àolínpǐkè wěiyuánhuì) respectively.)		Olga Fatkulina	Speed skating	
46	ROC	ROC		Vadim Shipachyov	Ice hockey	
47	France	法国	Fǎguó	Tessa Worley	Alpine skiing	
47	France	法国	Fǎguó	Kevin Rolland	Freestyle skiing	
48	Poland	波兰	Bōlán	Aleksandra Król	Snowboarding	
48	Poland	波兰	Bōlán	Zbigniew Bródka	Speed skating	
49	Puerto Rico	波多黎各	Bōduō Lígè	Kellie Delka	Skeleton	
49	Puerto Rico	波多黎各	Bōduō Lígè	William Flaherty	Alpine skiing	
50	Bosnia and Herzegovina	波黑	Bōhēi	Elvedina Muzaferija	Alpine skiing	
50	Bosnia and Herzegovina	波黑	Bōhēi	Mirza Nikolajev	Luge	
51	Bolivia	玻利维亚	Bōlìwéiyà	Simon Breitfuss Kammerlander	Alpine skiing	
52	Norway	挪威	Nuówēi	Kjetil Jansrud	Alpine skiing	
52	Norway	挪威	Nuówēi	Kristin Skaslien	Curling	
53	Kazakhstan	哈萨克斯坦	Hāsàkèsītǎn	Yekaterina Aidova	Speed skating	
53	Kazakhstan	哈萨克斯坦	Hāsàkèsītǎn	Abzal Azhgaliyev	Short track speed skating	
54	Kosovo	科索沃	Kēsuǒwò	Albin Tahiri	Alpine skiing	
55	Bulgaria	保加利亚	Bǎojiālìyà	Maria Zdravkova	Biathlon	
55	Bulgaria	保加利亚	Bǎojiālìyà	Radoslav Yankov	Snowboarding	
56	United States of America	美国	Měiguó	Brittany Bowe (Note: Bowe replaced Elana Meyers Taylor, who withdrew from the ceremony after testing positive for COVID-19.)	Speed skating	
56	United States of America	美国	Měiguó	John Shuster	Curling	
57	American Samoa	美属萨摩亚	Měishǔ Sàmóyà	Nathan Crumpton	Skeleton	
58	Virgin Islands, US	美属维尔京群岛	Měishǔ Wéiěrjīng Qúndǎo	Volunteer (Note: The Virgin Islands' only competitor, Katie Tannenbaum, was forced to miss the opening ceremony after testing positive for COVID-19.)	Volunteer	
59	Thailand	泰国	Tàiguó	Karen Chanloung	Cross-country skiing	
59	Thailand	泰国	Tàiguó	Nicola Zanon	Alpine skiing	
60	Netherlands	荷兰	Hélán	Lindsay van Zundert	Figure skating	
60	Netherlands	荷兰	Hélán	Kjeld Nuis	Speed skating	
61	Georgia	格鲁吉亚	Gélǔjíyà	Nino Tsiklauri	Alpine skiing	
61	Georgia	格鲁吉亚	Gélǔjíyà	Morisi Kvitelashvili	Figure skating	
62	Colombia	哥伦比亚	Gēlúnbǐyà	Laura Gómez	Speed skating	
62	Colombia	哥伦比亚	Gēlúnbǐyà	Carlos Andres Quintana	Cross-country skiing	
63	Trinidad and Tobago	特立尼达和多巴哥	Tèlìnídá hé Duōbāgē	Andre Marcano	Bobsleigh	
64	Peru	秘鲁	Bìlǔ	Ornella Oettl Reyes	Alpine skiing	
65	Ireland	爱尔兰	Aìěrlán	Elsa Desmond	Luge	
65	Ireland	爱尔兰	Aìěrlán	Brendan Newby	Freestyle skiing	
66	Estonia	爱沙尼亚	Aìshāníyà	Kelly Sildaru	Freestyle skiing	
66	Estonia	爱沙尼亚	Aìshāníyà	Martin Himma	Cross-country skiing	
67	Haiti	海地	Hǎidì	Richardson Viano	Alpine skiing	
68	Czech Republic	捷克	Jiékè	Alena Mills	Ice hockey	
68	Czech Republic	捷克	Jiékè	Michal Březina	Figure skating	
69	Philippines	菲律宾	Fēilǜbīn	Asa Miller	Alpine skiing	
70	Slovenia	斯洛文尼亚	Sīluòwénníyà	Ilka Štuhec	Alpine skiing	
70	Slovenia	斯洛文尼亚	Sīluòwénníyà	Rok Marguč	Snowboarding	
71	Slovakia	斯洛伐克	Sīluòfákè	Marek Hrivik	Ice hockey	
71	Slovakia	斯洛伐克	Sīluòfákè	Katarina Simonakova	Luge	
72	Portugal	葡萄牙	Pútáoyá	Ricardo Brancal	Alpine skiing	
72	Portugal	葡萄牙	Pútáoyá	Vanina Guerillot	Alpine skiing	
73	Republic of Korea	韩国	Hánguó	Kim A-lang (Note: Kim A-lang replaced Kim Min-sun.)	Short track speed skating	
73	Republic of Korea	韩国	Hánguó	Kwak Yoon-gy	Short track speed skating	
74	Montenegro	黑山	Hēishān	Eldar Salihović	Alpine skiing	
74	Montenegro	黑山	Hēishān	Jelena Vujicic	Alpine skiing	
75	Chile	智利	Zhìlì	Dominique Ohaco	Freestyle skiing	
75	Chile	智利	Zhìlì	Henrik von Appen	Alpine skiing	
76	Austria	奥地利	Aòdìlì	Julia Dujmovits	Snowboarding	
76	Austria	奥地利	Aòdìlì	Benjamin Maier	Bobsleigh	
77	Switzerland	瑞士	Ruìshì	Andres Ambühl	Ice hockey	
77	Switzerland	瑞士	Ruìshì	Wendy Holdener	Alpine skiing	
78	Sweden	瑞典	Ruìdiǎn	Oliwer Magnusson	Freestyle skiing	
78	Sweden	瑞典	Ruìdiǎn	Emma Nordin	Ice hockey	
79	Mongolia	蒙古	Měnggǔ	Ariunsanaagiin Enkhtuul	Cross-country skiing	
79	Mongolia	蒙古	Měnggǔ	Batmönkhiin Achbadrakh	Cross-country skiing	
80	New Zealand	新西兰	Xīn Xīlán	Alice Robinson	Alpine skiing	
80	New Zealand	新西兰	Xīn Xīlán	Finn Bilous	Freestyle skiing	
81	Serbia	塞尔维亚	Sàiěrwéiyà	Marko Vukićević	Alpine skiing	
82	Cyprus	塞浦路斯	Sàipǔlùsī	Yianno Kouyoumdjian	Alpine skiing	
83	Mexico	墨西哥	Mòxīgē	Sarah Schleper	Alpine skiing	
83	Mexico	墨西哥	Mòxīgē	Donovan Carrillo	Figure skating	
84	Lebanon	黎巴嫩	Líbānèn	Manon Ouaiss	Alpine skiing	
84	Lebanon	黎巴嫩	Líbānèn	Cesar Arnouk	Alpine skiing	
85	Germany	德国	Déguó	Francesco Friedrich	Bobsleigh	
85	Germany	德国	Déguó	Claudia Pechstein	Speed skating	
86	Republic of Moldova	摩尔多瓦	Móěrduōwǎ	Doina Descalui	Luge	
87	Monaco	摩纳哥	Mónàgē	Arnaud Alessandria	Alpine skiing	
88	Morocco	摩洛哥	Móluògē	Yassine Aouich	Alpine skiing	
89	Australia	澳大利亚	Àodàlìyǎ	Brendan Kerry	Figure skating	
89	Australia	澳大利亚	Àodàlìyǎ	Laura Peel	Freestyle skiing	
90	Italy	意大利	Yìdàlì	Michela Moioli	Snowboarding	
91	People's Republic of China	中国	Zhōngguó	Zhao Dan	Skeleton	
91	People's Republic of China	中国	Zhōngguó	Gao Tingyu	Speed skating	

== See also ==
- 2022 Winter Paralympics Parade of Nations
