= Figure skating at the 2018 Winter Olympics – Men's singles =

Men's singles at the XXIII Olympic Winter Games
- Venue: Gangneung Ice Arena; Gangneung, South Korea
- Dates: 16–17 February 2018
- Competitors: 30 from 21 nations
- Winning score: 317.85 points

Medalists
1st place, gold medalist(s)		Yuzuru Hanyu	Japan
2nd place, silver medalist(s)		Shoma Uno	Japan
3rd place, bronze medalist(s)		Javier Fernández	Spain

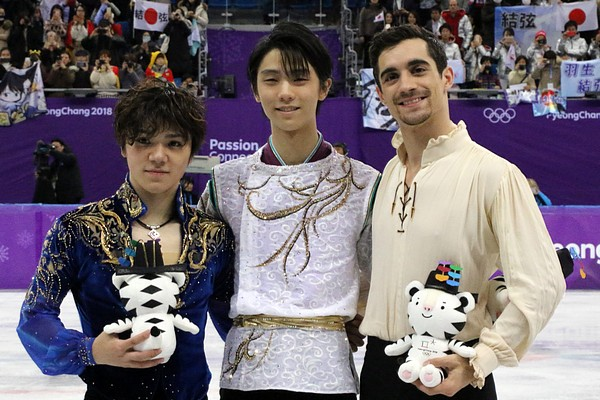
The medalists from the men's event at the 2018 Winter Olympics (from left to right): Shoma Uno of Japan (silver), Yuzuru Hanyu of Japan (gold), and Javier Fernández of Spain (bronze)

The men's singles figure skating competition at the 2018 Winter Olympics was held on 16 and 17 February at the Gangneung Ice Arena in Gangneung, South Korea, and featured 30 skaters from 21 nations. Yuzuru Hanyu and Shoma Uno, both of Japan, won the gold and silver medals, respectively; while Javier Fernández of Spain won the bronze. This was Hanyu's second Olympic gold medal, having also won the men's event at the 2014 Winter Olympics, making him the first men's singles skater to win two consecutive Olympic gold medals since 1952. Fernández' bronze medal was the first ever Olympic medal for Spain in figure skating. Controversy arose after the competition when an investigation by the International Skating Union determined that the Chinese judge in the men's event had given preferential scores to the Chinese skaters, while simultaneously giving low scores to their strongest competitors.

== Background ==
In 2016, an independent report commissioned by the World Anti-Doping Agency confirmed allegations that the Russian Olympic team had been involved in a state-sponsored doping program from at least late 2011 through February 2014, when Russia hosted the Winter Olympics in Sochi. On 5 December 2017, the International Olympic Committee announced that the Russian Olympic Committee had been suspended from the 2018 Winter Olympics. Athletes with no previous drug violations and a consistent history of drug testing were permitted to compete under the Olympic flag as an "Olympic Athlete from Russia" (OAR). Under the terms of the decree, neither the Russian flag nor anthem were to be used at the Olympics; the Olympic flag and Olympic Anthem were used instead.

The men's single skating event was one of five figure skating competitions contested at the 2018 Winter Olympics in Gangneung, South Korea. It was held at the Gangneung Ice Arena over two days: the short program took place on 16 February and the free skating on 17 February. The 2018 Winter Olympics were the first to allow vocal music for all skating disciplines; the International Skating Union modified its policies which had limited skaters to the use of only instrumental music after the 2014 Winter Olympics. Yuzuru Hanyu of Japan was the reigning Olympic champion, having won the gold medal at the 2014 Winter Olympics while setting a new world record in the short program. Hanyu was a two-time world champion and four-time Japanese national champion. However, he had injured his ankle at the 2017 NHK Trophy and withdrawn from public view to recuperate. The 2018 Olympics were his first competition since his injury. Expected to be his biggest challengers were Javier Fernández of Spain, Shoma Uno of Japan, and Nathan Chen of the United States. Fernández was a two-time world champion, six-time European champion, and seven-time Spanish national champion. Uno was the 2017 World Championship silver medalist and two-time Japanese national champion. Chen, nicknamed the "Quad King" for his prowess in performing quadruple jumps, was the first skater to successfully perform five quadruple jumps in a single program (at the 2017 U.S. Championships). He was also the 2017 Four Continents champion, two-time U.S. national champion, and was the last skater to beat Hanyu in competition (at the 2017 Rostelecom Cup).

== Qualification ==
Twenty-four quota spots in the men's event were awarded based on the results at the 2017 World Figure Skating Championships. An additional six quota spots were earned at the 2017 Nebelhorn Trophy. This was the first time that Malaysia had ever qualified for a figure skating event at the Winter Olympics; Julian Yee also served as the country's flag bearer.

While Alexander Majorov earned an Olympic spot for Sweden by finishing third at the Nebelhorn Trophy, the Swedish Olympic Committee declined to send him to the Olympics, as he did not meet their prescribed standards. The Swedish Olympic Committee had required that Majorov finish within the top eight at an international competition and did not count his seventh-place finish at the 2018 European Figure Skating Championships, because it was not a truly international event. That quota spot was re-allocated to the Philippines, who chose to send Michael Christian Martinez.

Qualifying nations in men's singles
Event	Skaters per NOC	Qualifying NOCs	Total skaters
2017 World Championships	3	Japan; United States	24
2017 World Championships	2	China; Spain; Canada (International Olympic Committee) OAR; Israel	24
2017 World Championships	1	Uzbekistan; Georgia; Latvia; Australia; Kazakhstan; France; Czech Republic; Germany	24
2017 Nebelhorn Trophy	1	Belgium; ~~Sweden~~; Italy; South Korea; Malaysia; Ukraine; Philippines	6
Total			30

== Required performance elements ==
Men performed their short programs on 16 February. Lasting 2 minutes 40 seconds (+/− 10 seconds), the short program had to include the following elements: one double or triple Axel; one triple or quadruple jump immediately preceded by connecting steps; one jump combination consisting of a double jump and a triple jump, two triple jumps, or a quadruple jump and a double jump or triple jump; one flying spin; one camel spin or sit spin with a change of foot; one spin combination with a change of foot; and a step sequence using the full ice surface.

The twenty-four highest-scoring skaters after the short program advanced to the free skating, which they performed on 17 February. Lasting 4 minutes 30 seconds (+/− 10 seconds), the free skate had to include the following: eight jump elements, of which one had to be an Axel-type jump; three spins, of which one had to be a spin combination, one a flying spin, and one a spin with only one position; a step sequence; and a choreographic sequence.

== Judging ==
Skaters were judged according to the required technical elements of their program (such as jumps and spins), as well as the overall presentation of their program, based on five program components (skating skills, transitions, performance, composition, and musical interpretation/timing). Each technical element in a figure skating performance was assigned a predetermined base point value and scored by a panel of nine judges on a scale from −3 to +3 based on the quality of its execution. Each Grade of Execution (GOE) from –3 to +3 was assigned a value as indicated on the Scale of Values. For example, a triple Axel was worth a base value of 8.50 points, and a GOE of +3 was worth 3.00 points, so a triple Axel with a GOE of +3 earned 11.50 points. The judging panel's GOE for each element was determined by calculating the trimmed mean (the average after discarding the highest and lowest scores). The panel's scores for all elements were added together to generate a Total Elements Score. At the same time, the judges evaluated each performance based on the five aforementioned program components and assigned each a score from 0.25 to 10 in 0.25-point increments. The judging panel's final score for each program component was also determined by calculating the trimmed mean. Those scores were then multiplied by the factor shown on the chart below; the results were added together to generate a total Program Component Score.

Program component factoring
Discipline	Short program	Free skate
Men	1.00	2.00

Deductions were applied for certain violations, such as time infractions or falls. The Total Elements Score and Program Component Score were then added together, minus any deductions, to generate a final performance score for each skater or team.

== Results ==
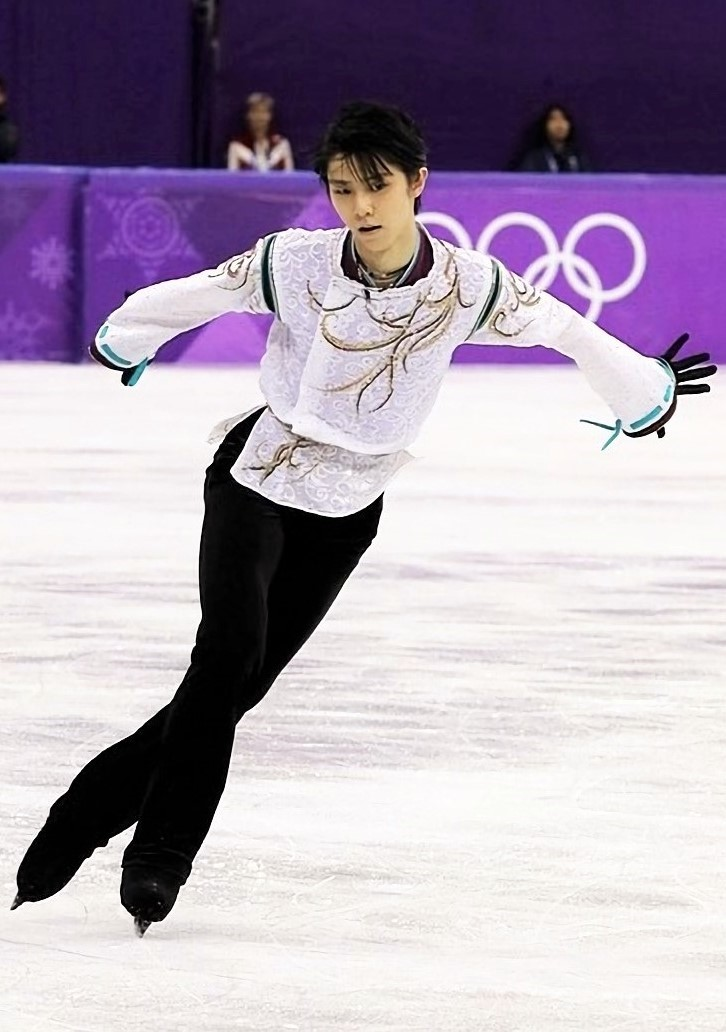
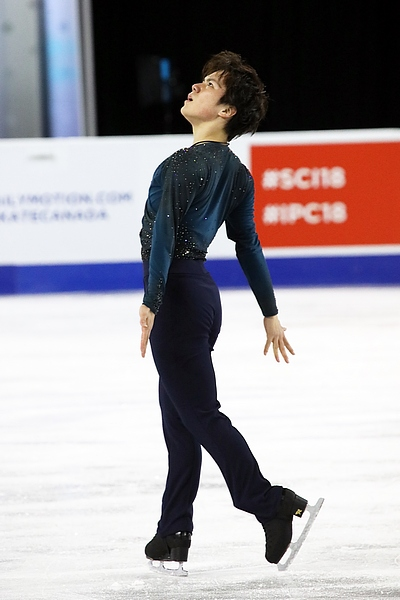
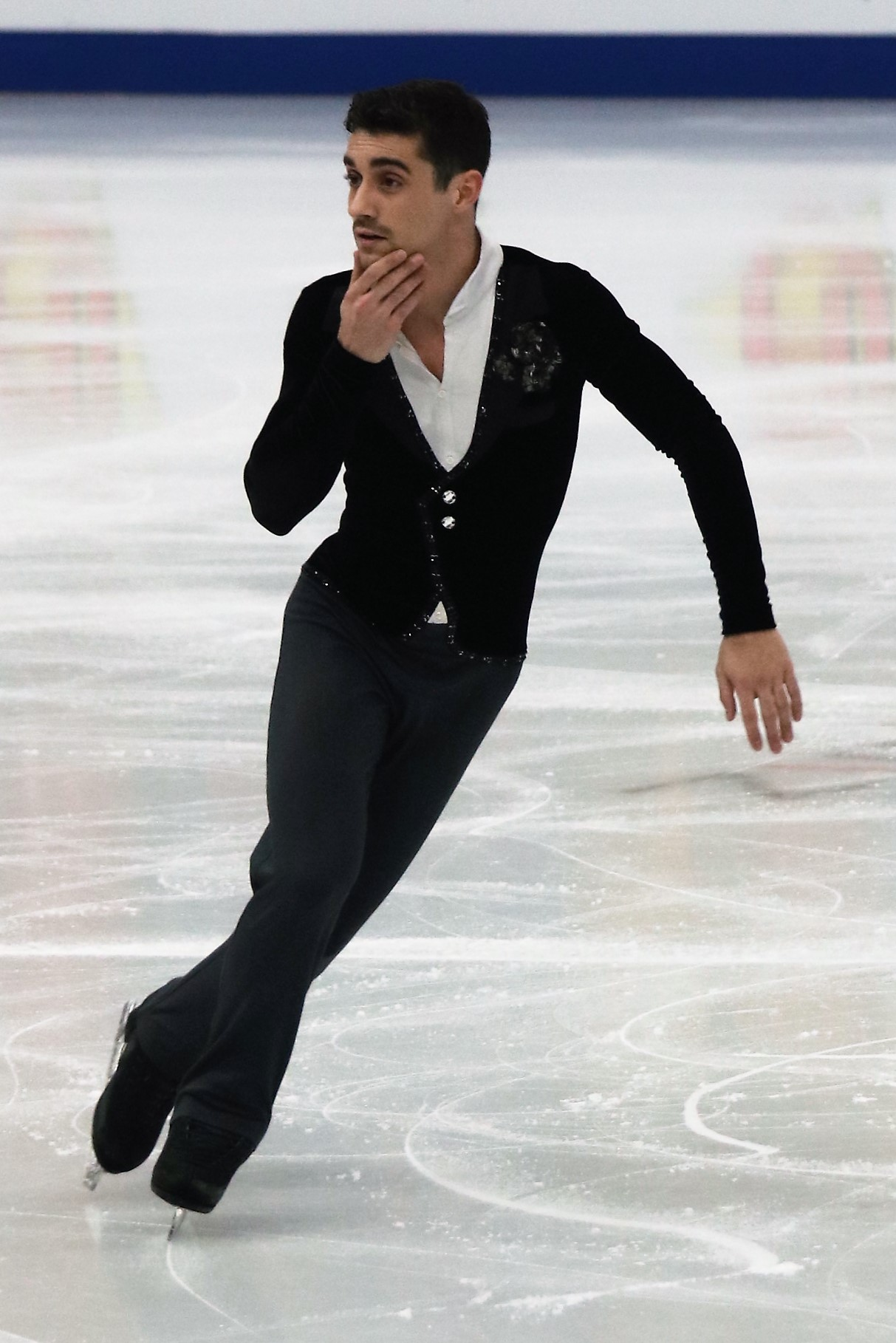
The gold, silver, and bronze medalists from the men's event at the 2022 Winter Olympics (from left to right):
Yuzuru Hanyu of Japan (gold), Shoma Uno of Japan (silver), and Javier Fernández of Spain (bronze)

Code key

- TSS – Total Segment Score
- TES – Total Elements Score
- PCS – Program Component Score
- SS – Skating skills
- TR – Transitions
- PE – Performance
- CO – Composition
- IN – Musical interpretation
- DED – Deductions

=== Short program ===
The men's short program was held on 16 February. Yuzuru Hanyu of Japan finished in first place with a score of 111.68. He successfully performed every element of his program, as did the next three skaters in progression. Javier Fernández of Spain finished in second place, Shoma Uno of Japan, finished in third, and Jin Boyang of China finished in fourth. The performances from all four were described by the Associated Press as "magnificent and spotless". Dmitri Aliev of Russia successfully performed two quadruple jumps, including a quadruple Lutz, earning a new personal best score of 98.93 and finishing in fifth place. Patrick Chan of Canada, competing for the third time in a week, fell on his triple Axel and finished in sixth place. Adam Rippon of the United States, performing without a quadruple jump, finished in seventh place, while his teammate Nathan Chen missed all of his planned jumps and finished seventeenth. Vincent Zhou, also of the United States, successfully performed the first quadruple Lutz ever at the Winter Olympics, although he finished in twelfth place after under-rotating his triple Axel. Dmitri Aliev performed after Zhou, so his quadruple Lutz was the second performed at the Olympics.

Men's short program results
Pl.	Skater	Nation	TSS	TES	PCS	SS	TR	PE	CO	IN	DED
1	Yuzuru Hanyu	Japan	111.68	63.18	48.50	9.71	9.43	9.86	9.75	9.75	0.00
2	Javier Fernández	Spain	107.58	59.79	47.79	9.36	9.36	9.71	9.68	9.68	0.00
3	Shoma Uno	Japan	104.17	58.13	46.04	9.29	9.00	9.25	9.29	9.21	0.00
4	Jin Boyang	China	103.32	60.27	43.05	8.79	8.29	8.82	8.54	8.61	0.00
5	Dmitri Aliev	(International Olympic Committee) OAR	98.98	56.98	42.00	8.43	8.11	8.50	8.50	8.46	0.00
6	Patrick Chan	Canada	90.01	45.08	45.93	9.36	9.07	9.00	9.29	9.21	1.00
7	Adam Rippon	United States	87.95	44.48	43.47	8.57	8.43	8.86	8.68	8.93	0.00
8	Mikhail Kolyada	(International Olympic Committee) OAR	86.69	43.84	43.85	8.96	8.54	8.64	8.82	8.89	1.00
9	Michal Březina	Czech Republic	85.15	44.34	40.81	8.25	7.89	8.25	8.21	8.21	0.00
10	Keegan Messing	Canada	85.11	45.50	40.61	8.04	7.96	8.07	8.29	8.25	1.00
11	Jorik Hendrickx	Belgium	84.74	44.17	40.57	7.96	7.89	8.25	8.18	8.29	0.00
12	Vincent Zhou	United States	84.53	48.50	36.03	7.39	6.96	7.11	7.32	7.25	0.00
13	Alexei Bychenko	Israel	84.13	43.63	40.50	7.93	7.71	8.36	8.18	8.32	0.00
14	Misha Ge	Uzbekistan	83.90	41.75	42.15	8.18	8.18	8.54	8.46	8.79	0.00
15	Cha Jun-hwan	South Korea	83.43	43.79	39.64	7.93	7.68	8.07	8.00	7.96	0.00
16	Brendan Kerry	Australia	83.06	45.49	37.57	7.57	7.36	7.61	7.57	7.46	0.00
17	Nathan Chen	United States	82.27	41.39	41.88	8.46	8.32	8.14	8.57	8.39	1.00
18	Daniel Samohin	Israel	80.69	43.29	38.40	7.79	7.29	7.79	7.71	7.82	1.00
19	Yan Han	China	80.63	40.99	40.64	8.46	8.07	7.86	8.18	8.07	1.00
20	Keiji Tanaka	Japan	80.05	40.30	40.75	8.36	7.86	8.07	8.21	8.25	1.00
21	Deniss Vasiļjevs	Latvia	79.52	39.34	41.18	8.25	8.00	8.18	8.39	8.36	1.00
22	Morisi Kvitelashvili	Georgia	76.56	40.88	36.68	7.46	7.11	7.32	7.43	7.36	1.00
23	Matteo Rizzo	Italy	75.63	39.23	36.40	7.29	7.11	7.29	7.39	7.32	0.00
24	Paul Fentz	Germany	74.73	37.71	37.02	7.46	7.25	7.46	7.46	7.39	0.00
25	Julian Yee	Malaysia	73.58	38.37	35.21	7.07	6.82	7.11	7.14	7.07	0.00
26	Chafik Besseghier	France	72.10	38.41	33.69	6.79	6.29	6.89	6.86	6.86	0.00
27	Denis Ten	Kazakhstan	70.12	30.77	39.35	8.11	7.82	7.46	8.07	7.89	0.00
28	Michael Christian Martinez	Philippines	55.56	26.04	29.52	5.96	5.64	5.96	6.00	5.96	0.00
29	Felipe Montoya	Spain	52.41	22.59	30.82	6.25	6.07	6.00	6.25	6.25	1.00
30	Yaroslav Paniot	Ukraine	46.58	18.68	29.90	6.43	5.79	5.61	6.21	5.86	2.00

=== Free skating ===
The men's free skate was held on 17 February. Yuzuru Hanyu successfully performed four quadruple jumps during his free skate, winning the gold medal with a total score of 317.85 points. Hanyu became the first skater to win back-to-back Olympic gold medals in the men's event since Dick Button in 1952. Shoma Uno won the silver medal after backloading his program; that is, performing jumps in the second half of a routine so as to maximize the bonus points that those jumps could receive. In this case, he performed one quadruple jump and three triple jumps in the last minute of his routine. Javier Fernández won the bronze medal, ultimately finishing just 1.66 points behind Uno. This was the first Olympic medal in figure skating for Spain.

Nathan Chen finished first in the free skate, setting a new personal best score in the free skate with 215.08 points. He also became the first skater to successfully perform five quadruple jumps at the Winter Olympics. Chen had attempted a sixth quadruple jump, but touched the ice on the landing of one of them. After his disastrous short program, Chen decided the only way to remain in the competition was to attempt all six quadruple jumps.

This event was the 1000th medal event in the history of the Winter Olympics.

Men's free skate results
Pl.	Skater	Nation	TSS	TES	PCS	SS	TR	PE	CO	IN	DED
1	Nathan Chen	United States	215.08	127.64	87.44	8.82	8.32	9.04	8.79	8.75	0.00
2	Yuzuru Hanyu	Japan	206.17	109.55	96.62	9.71	9.50	9.64	9.71	9.75	0.00
3	Shoma Uno	Japan	202.73	111.01	92.72	9.36	9.07	9.25	9.32	9.36	1.00
4	Javier Fernández	Spain	197.66	101.52	96.14	9.46	9.43	9.64	9.79	9.75	0.00
5	Jin Boyang	China	194.45	109.69	85.76	8.71	8.21	8.64	8.68	8.64	1.00
6	Vincent Zhou	United States	192.16	112.24	79.92	8.04	7.71	8.25	7.96	8.00	0.00
7	Mikhail Kolyada	(International Olympic Committee) OAR	177.56	91.62	87.94	9.00	8.64	8.68	8.86	8.72	2.00
8	Patrick Chan	Canada	173.42	81.56	91.86	9.32	9.14	8.66	9.29	9.32	0.00
9	Alexei Bychenko	Israel	172.88	89.08	83.80	8.39	8.04	8.61	8.43	8.43	0.00
10	Adam Rippon	United States	171.41	84.47	86.94	8.75	8.54	8.68	8.71	8.79	0.00
11	Daniel Samohin	Israel	170.75	89.03	81.72	8.32	7.75	8.32	8.18	8.29	0.00
12	Keegan Messing	Canada	170.32	84.88	85.44	8.50	8.29	8.61	8.61	8.71	0.00
13	Dmitri Aliev	(International Olympic Committee) OAR	168.53	85.39	85.13	8.64	8.39	8.32	8.61	8.61	2.00
14	Cha Jun-hwan	South Korea	165.16	84.94	81.22	8.21	7.86	8.25	8.11	8.18	1.00
15	Keiji Tanaka	Japan	164.78	85.64	81.14	8.36	7.89	8.00	8.18	8.14	2.00
16	Jorik Hendrickx	Belgium	164.21	81.79	82.42	8.25	7.96	8.36	8.25	8.39	0.00
17	Misha Ge	Uzbekistan	161.04	74.96	86.08	8.46	8.36	8.54	8.75	8.93	0.00
18	Michal Březina	Czech Republic	160.92	76.58	84.34	8.57	8.21	8.39	8.57	8.43	0.00
19	Matteo Rizzo	Italy	156.78	80.86	75.92	7.64	7.32	7.79	7.64	7.57	0.00
20	Deniss Vasiļjevs	Latvia	155.06	76.42	80.64	8.14	7.86	7.96	8.18	8.18	2.00
21	Brendan Kerry	Australia	150.75	73.33	77.42	7.96	7.54	7.68	7.82	7.71	0.00
22	Paul Fentz	Germany	139.82	66.98	72.84	7.50	7.14	7.14	7.39	7.25	0.00
23	Yan Han	China	132.38	53.80	79.58	8.56	7.82	7.57	8.04	8.00	1.00
24	Morisi Kvitelashvili	Georgia	128.01	63.35	70.66	7.34	6.86	6.68	7.32	7.04	6.00

=== Overall ===
Men's results
Rank	Skater	Nation	Total	SP		FS	
1st place, gold medalist(s)	Yuzuru Hanyu	Japan	317.85	1	111.68	2	206.17
2nd place, silver medalist(s)	Shoma Uno	Japan	306.90	3	104.17	3	202.73
3rd place, bronze medalist(s)	Javier Fernández	Spain	305.24	2	107.58	4	197.66
4	Jin Boyang	China	297.77	4	103.32	5	194.45
5	Nathan Chen	United States	297.35	17	82.27	1	215.08
6	Vincent Zhou	United States	276.69	12	84.53	6	192.16
7	Dmitri Aliev	(International Olympic Committee) OAR	267.51	5	98.98	13	168.53
8	Mikhail Kolyada	(International Olympic Committee) OAR	264.25	8	86.69	7	177.56
9	Patrick Chan	Canada	263.43	6	90.01	8	173.42
10	Adam Rippon	United States	259.36	7	87.95	10	171.41
11	Alexei Bychenko	Israel	257.01	13	84.13	9	172.88
12	Keegan Messing	Canada	255.43	10	85.11	12	170.32
13	Daniel Samohin	Israel	251.44	18	80.69	11	170.75
14	Jorik Hendrickx	Belgium	248.95	11	84.74	16	164.21
15	Cha Jun-hwan	South Korea	248.59	15	83.43	14	165.16
16	Michal Březina	Czech Republic	246.07	9	85.15	18	160.92
17	Misha Ge	Uzbekistan	244.94	14	83.90	17	161.04
18	Keiji Tanaka	Japan	244.83	20	80.05	15	164.78
19	Deniss Vasiļjevs	Latvia	234.58	21	79.52	20	155.06
20	Brendan Kerry	Australia	233.81	16	83.06	21	150.75
21	Matteo Rizzo	Italy	232.41	23	75.63	19	156.78
22	Paul Fentz	Germany	214.55	24	74.73	22	139.82
23	Yan Han	China	213.01	19	80.63	23	132.38
24	Morisi Kvitelashvili	Georgia	204.57	22	76.56	24	128.01
25	Julian Yee	Malaysia	73.58	25	73.58	Did not advance to free skate	
26	Chafik Besseghier	France	72.10	26	72.10	Did not advance to free skate	
27	Denis Ten	Kazakhstan	70.12	27	70.12	Did not advance to free skate	
28	Michael Christian Martinez	Philippines	55.56	28	55.56	Did not advance to free skate	
29	Felipe Montoya	Spain	52.41	29	52.41	Did not advance to free skate	
30	Yaroslav Paniot	Ukraine	46.58	30	46.58	Did not advance to free skate	

== Judging investigation ==
The International Skating Union (ISU) launched an investigation into two Chinese judges following the 2018 Winter Olympics: Chen Weiguang, who had been a judge in the men's event, and Huang Feng, who had been a judge in the pairs' event. Both were found to have given "preferential marking" to Chinese skaters and deliberately low scores to their strongest competitors. The investigation into Chen began in April and was concluded in June. Chen had given her highest scores for Grades of Execution and her second highest Program Component Scores to Jin Boyang of China; both sets of scores were noticeably different from the scores awarded by the other judges. Chen had awarded Jin with scores of +3 in six elements, which none of the other judges had done. Chen had also awarded Jin with scores of 9.50 in three separate program components, while other judges had awarded Jin scores of 7.75 for those same components. The ISU concluded that Chen's scoring showed "evidence of preference for the Chinese skater and prejudice against his strongest competitors". As a result, she received a two-year suspension from judging and was barred from judging at the 2022 Winter Olympics in Beijing. The ISU described the behavior of both judges as "one of the most serious ethical offences" that a judge can commit.

== Works cited ==
- "Special Regulations & Technical Rules – Single & Pair Skating and Ice Dance 2016". International Skating Union. p. 24. Archived from the original on 4 January 2018.
