= Alisa Lozko =

Russian former figure skater (born 2002)

Personal information
- Native name: Алиса Вадимовна Лозко
- Full name: Alisa Vadimovna Lozko
- Born: 1 June 2002 (age 24) Izhevsk, Russia
- Home town: Saint Petersburg
- Height: 1.56 m (5 ft 1 1/2 in)

Figure skating career
- Country: Russia
- Skating club: Zvezdnyj Led, St. Petersburg
- Began skating: 2006
- Retired: 2019

Alisa Vadimovna Lozko (Russian: Алиса Вадимовна Лозко; born 1 June 2002) is a Russian former figure skater. She is the 2016 JGP Czech Republic bronze medalist, the 2016 Bavarian Open junior champion, the 2015 Denkova-Staviski Cup junior champion, and the 2016 Sportland Trophy junior champion.

== Personal life ==
Alisa Lozko was born on 1 June 2002 in Izhevsk, Russia.

== Career ==
Lozko started skating in 2006, training in the same rink as Olympic champion Alina Zagitova. Svetlana Nekhroshev coached her until 2012. She was then invited to train in Alexei Mishin's group in Saint Petersburg.

=== 2015–16 season ===
Lozko debuted internationally in the 2015–16 season, winning the 2015 Denkova-Staviski Cup in the junior category. At the Russian Nationals, she was 5th on the junior level. She won the gold medal at the 2016 Bavarian Open and another one at the 2016 Sportland Trophy.

=== 2016–17 season ===
In the 2016–17 season, Lozko made her debut at the Junior Grand Prix. She won the bronze medal in Ostrava, Czech Republic, behind Japan's Rika Kihira and countrymate Anastasiia Gubanova. Lozko then placed fifth in the 2016 JGP Slovenia and failed to qualify for the Junior Grand Prix Final. At the Russian Championships, Lozko debuted in the senior level and finished in 14th in both programs and overall.

Lozko decided to switch coaches going to Moscow to "try her luck" with Eteri Tutberidze, but did not succeed. Mishin, hearing the rumors of his student moving to Tutberidze's group, recommended all the coaches in SKA St. Petersburg to refuse coaching Lozko again. She was then coached by Alina Pisarenko in SKA without Mishin's knowledge. After landing triple Axel and quadruple jumps in practice, Lozko had an injury.

=== Later career ===
After a long recovery of her injury, it was announced that she teamed up with Adian Pitkeev for ice dance and that the team would be coached by Elena Ilinykh. They never competed together.

Lozko works as a coach.

== Programs ==
| Season | Short program | Free skating |
|---|---|---|
| 2016–2017 | Anna Pavlova by Eugen Doga choreo. by Irina Manuilova | Milord by Édith Piaf choreo. by Irina Manuilova |
| 2015–2016 | Anna Pavlova by Eugen Doga choreo. by Irina Manuilova | Icare (from Cirque du Soleil) by René Dupéré; Rachel's Song (from Blade Runner) by Vangelis choreo. by Irina Manuilova |

== Competitive highlights ==
JGP: Junior Grand Prix

International: Junior
| Event | 15–16 | 16–17 |
|---|---|---|
| JGP Czech Republic | | 3rd |
| JGP Slovenia | | 5th |
| Bavarian Open | 1st | |
| Denkova-Staviski | 1st | |
| Sportland Trophy | 1st | |
National
| Russian Champ. | | 14th |
| Russian Junior Champ. | 5th | |
TBD = Assigned; WD = Withdrew
