= Malaysia at the Olympics =

- IOC code: MAS
- NOC: Olympic Council of Malaysia
- Website: www.olympic.org.my (in English)
- Medals Ranked 119th: Gold 0 Silver 8 Bronze 7 Total 15

Summer appearances
- 1956; 1960; 1964; 1968; 1972; 1976; 1980; 1984; 1988; 1992; 1996; 2000; 2004; 2008; 2012; 2016; 2020; 2024; 2028

Winter appearances
- 2018; 2022; 2026

Other related appearances
- North Borneo (1956)

Malaysia first participated at the Olympic Games in 1956, and has sent athletes to compete in every Summer Olympic Games since then, except when Malaysia participated in the American-led boycott of the 1980 Summer Olympics. The nation made its debut at the Winter Olympic Games in 2018.

The Federation of Malaya Olympic Council, the forerunner to the Olympic Council of Malaysia, was recognized by the International Olympic Committee in 1954. The Federation of Malaya (now the states comprising West Malaysia) competed as Malaya (MAL) in the 1956 and 1960 Games. The present day state of Sabah sent an independent team to the 1956 Games as North Borneo, and Singapore also competed at the Olympics from 1948 to 1960. After these British colonies federated to form an independent Malaysia in 1963, the nation competed under that name for the first time at the 1964 Summer Olympics. Malaysia would inherit Malaya's code MAL until 1988 when it started competing under its present code MAS. Singapore would subsequently regain independence from Malaysia in 1965 and compete once again as Singapore from 1968 onwards.

Malaysian athletes have won a total of 15 Olympic medals, 11 in badminton, 2 in diving and 2 in cycling. The first Malaysian Olympians to win Olympic medals were two of the Sidek brothers, Jalani Sidek and Razif Sidek back in the 1992 Summer Olympics. No Malaysian athlete has ever won a gold medal, making Malaysia the country that has won the most Olympic medals without earning gold.

Malaysian athletes first competed at the 2018 Winter Olympics and a female athlete first competed for Malaysia at the 2022 Winter Olympics. Malaysia has competed in alpine skiing and figure skating.

== Timeline of participation ==
Olympic Year/s	Teams		
1948–1952	Singapore (SIN)		
1956	Singapore (SIN)	Malaya (MAL)	North Borneo
1960	Singapore (SIN)	Malaya (MAL)	
1964	Malaysia (MAL)		
1968–1988	Singapore (SIN)	Malaysia (MAL)	
1992–2016	Singapore (SIN)	Malaysia (MAS)	
2020–present	Singapore (SGP)	Malaysia (MAS)	

== Medal tables ==
=== Medals by Summer Games ===
Games	Athletes	Gold	Silver	Bronze	Total	Rank
1956 Melbourne	As Malaya and North Borneo					
1960 Rome	As Malaya					
1964 Tokyo	62	0	0	0	0	–
1968 Mexico City	31	0	0	0	0	–
1972 Munich	45	0	0	0	0	–
1976 Montreal	23	0	0	0	0	–
1980 Moscow	boycotted					
1984 Los Angeles	21	0	0	0	0	–
1988 Seoul	9	0	0	0	0	–
1992 Barcelona	26	0	0	1	1	54
1996 Atlanta	35	0	1	1	2	58
2000 Sydney	40	0	0	0	0	–
2004 Athens	26	0	0	0	0	–
2008 Beijing	32	0	1	0	1	72
2012 London	29	0	1	1	2	65
2016 Rio de Janeiro	32	0	4	1	5	60
2020 Tokyo	30	0	1	1	2	74
2024 Paris	26	0	0	2	2	80
2028 Los Angeles	future event					
2032 Brisbane	future event					
Total		0	8	7	15	119

=== Medals by Winter Games ===
Games	Athletes	Gold	Silver	Bronze	Total	Rank
2018 Pyeongchang	2	0	0	0	0	–
2022 Beijing	2	0	0	0	0	–
2026 Milano Cortina	1	0	0	0	0	–
2030 French Alps	future event					
2034 Utah	future event					
Total		0	0	0	0	−

=== Medals by summer sport ===
Sport	Gold	Silver	Bronze	Total
Badminton	0	6	5	11
Cycling	0	1	1	2
Diving	0	1	1	2
Totals (3 entries)	0	8	7	15

=== Medals of demonstration and exhibition sports ===
*Only for demonstration and exhibition sports medalists

Sport	Gold	Silver	Bronze	Total
Wushu	0	2	3	5
Badminton	0	1	0	1
Taekwondo	0	0	1	1
Totals (3 entries)	0	3	4	7

== List of medalists ==
Medal	Name	Games	Sport	Event
Bronze	Razif Sidek; Jalani Sidek	1992 Barcelona	Badminton	Men's doubles
Silver	Cheah Soon Kit; Yap Kim Hock	1996 Atlanta	Badminton	Men's doubles
Bronze	Rashid Sidek	1996 Atlanta	Badminton	Men's singles
Silver	Lee Chong Wei	2008 Beijing	Badminton	Men's singles
Silver	Lee Chong Wei	2012 London	Badminton	Men's singles
Bronze	Pandelela Rinong	2012 London	Diving	Women's 10 metre platform
Silver	Lee Chong Wei	2016 Rio de Janeiro	Badminton	Men's singles
Silver	Goh V Shem; Tan Wee Kiong	2016 Rio de Janeiro	Badminton	Men's doubles
Silver	Chan Peng Soon; Goh Liu Ying	2016 Rio de Janeiro	Badminton	Mixed doubles
Silver	Cheong Jun Hoong; Pandelela Rinong	2016 Rio de Janeiro	Diving	Women's synchronised 10 metre platform
Bronze	Azizulhasni Awang	2016 Rio de Janeiro	Cycling	Men's keirin
Silver	Azizulhasni Awang	2020 Tokyo	Cycling	Men's keirin
Bronze	Aaron Chia; Soh Wooi Yik	2020 Tokyo	Badminton	Men's doubles
Bronze	Aaron Chia; Soh Wooi Yik	2024 Paris	Badminton	Men's doubles
Bronze	Lee Zii Jia	2024 Paris	Badminton	Men's singles

=== Demonstration sports medalists ===
The following are medalists in official demonstration sports in the Summer Olympic Games.

Medals gained from demonstration sports
Medal	Name	Games	Sport	Event
Silver	Ng Boon Bee; Punch Gunalan	1972 Munich	Badminton	Men's doubles
Bronze	Hii King Hung	1992 Barcelona	Taekwondo	Bantamweight (47–51 kg)
Silver	Lim Yew Fai	2008 Beijing	Wushu	Men's Jianshu / Qiangshu
Silver	Chai Fong Ying	2008 Beijing	Wushu	Men's Taijiquan / Taijijian
Bronze	Pui Fook Chien	2008 Beijing	Wushu	Men's Nanquan / Nangun
Bronze	Chai Fong Wei	2008 Beijing	Wushu	Women's Daoshu / Gunshu
Bronze	Diana Bong Siong Lin	2008 Beijing	Wushu	Women's Nanquan / Nandao

=== Medals by individual ===
According to official data of the International Olympic Committee. This is a list of people who have won two or more Olympic medals for Malaysia.

Athlete	Sport	Years	Games	Gender	1st place, gold medalist(s)	2nd place, silver medalist(s)	3rd place, bronze medalist(s)	Total
Lee Chong Wei	Badminton	2008–2016	Summer	Men	0	3	0	3
Pandelela Rinong	Diving	2012–2016	Summer	Women	0	1	1	2
**Azizulhasni Awang**	Cycling	2016–2020	Summer	Men	0	1	1	2
**Aaron Chia**	Badminton	2020–2024	Summer	Men	0	0	2	2
**Soh Wooi Yik**	Badminton	2020–2024	Summer	Men	0	0	2	2

- **People in bold** are still active competitors.

== See also ==
- Malaysia at the Paralympics
- Malaysia at the Youth Olympics
- List of flag bearers for Malaysia at the Olympics
