= Malaysia at the 2018 Winter Olympics =

- Flag of Malaysia
- IOC code: MAS
- NOC: Olympic Council of Malaysia
- Website: www.olympic.org.my

in PyeongChang, South Korea 9–25 February 2018
- Competitors: 2 in 2 sports
- Flag bearer: Julian Yee (opening)
- Medals: Gold 0 Silver 0 Bronze 0 Total 0

Winter Olympics appearances (overview)
- 2018; 2022; 2026

Malaysia competed at the 2018 Winter Olympics in Pyeongchang, South Korea, from 9 to 25 February 2018. The country's participation in Pyeongchang marked its debut appearance in the Winter Olympics.

Malaysia was represented by two athletes who competed across two sports. Julian Yee served as the country's flag-bearer during the opening ceremony and a volunteer carried the flag during the closing ceremony. Malaysia did not win any medals in the Games.

== Background ==
The Olympic Council of Malaysia was recognized by the International Olympic Committee in 1954. It made its first Olympics appearance as an independent nation at the 1964 Summer Olympics. The current edition marked its debut appearance at the Winter Olympics.

The 2018 Winter Olympics were held in Pyeongchang, South Korea between 9 and 25 February 2018. Malaysia's team consisted of five people: two athletes, two officials and one chef de mission. Julian Yee served as the country's flag-bearer during the opening ceremony, and a volunteer carried the flag during the closing ceremony. He did not win a medal.

== Competitors ==
Two competitors participated at the Games representing the country.

Sport	Men	Women	Total
Alpine skiing	1	0	1
Figure skating	1	0	1
Total	2	0	2

== Alpine skiing ==
Malaysia has qualified a single male athlete for alpine skiing. Jeffrey Webb became the first Malaysian to qualify for the Winter Olympics. Webb was born to an American father and Malaysian mother, allowing him to compete for the country.

The Alpine skiing events were held at the Jeongseon Alpine Centre in Bukpyeong. The course for the events was designed by former Olympic champion Bernhard Russi. The weather was cold and windy during the events, and it was the coldest since the 1994 Winter Olympics at Lillehammer. Webb recorded his best finish in the men's giant slalom event, after he was ranked 68th amongst the 109 competitors. He did not finish the men's slalom event.

Athlete	Event	Run 1		Run 2		Total	
Athlete	Event	Time	Rank	Time	Rank	Time	Rank
Jeffrey Webb	Men's giant slalom	1:23.83	78	1:23.84	70	2:47.67	68
Jeffrey Webb	Men's slalom	DNF					

== Figure skating ==
Figure skater Julian Yee became the second Malaysian to qualify for the Winter Olympic Games by finishing among the top six skaters who had previously yet to secure qualification at the 2017 Nebelhorn Trophy.

The figure skating competitions were held on 16 and 17 February 2018 at the Gangneung Ice Arena, Gangneung Olympic Park, Coastal Cluster, Gangneung. Lee finished 25th in the short program amongst the 30 participants and failed to advance to the freestyle round.

Athlete	Event	SP		FS		Total	
Athlete	Event	Points	Rank	Points	Rank	Points	Rank
Julian Yee	Men's singles	73.58	25	did not advance			

== See also ==
- Malaysia at the 2017 Asian Winter Games
- Malaysia at the 2018 Commonwealth Games
