= Malaysia at the 2022 Winter Olympics =

- Flag of Malaysia
- IOC code: MAS
- NOC: Olympic Council of Malaysia
- Website: www.olympic.org.my

in Beijing, China 4–20 February 2022
- Competitors: 2 (1 man and 1 woman) in 1 sport
- Flag bearers (opening): Jeffrey Webb; Aruwin Salehhuddin
- Flag bearer (closing): Jeffrey Webb
- Medals: Gold 0 Silver 0 Bronze 0 Total 0

Winter Olympics appearances (overview)
- 2018; 2022; 2026

Malaysia competed at the 2022 Winter Olympics in Beijing, China, from 4 to 20 February 2022. This was the country's second appearance at the Winter Olympics and also the second consecutive time since their first appearance at the 2018 Winter Olympics.

Malaysia's team consisted of two alpine skiers (one per gender). These were the first Winter Olympics for Malaysia with a female athlete on the team. Moira Tan Siew See was appointed as the chef-de-mission of the delegation on 25 September 2021 during the 198th Olympic Council of Malaysia (OCM) Executive Council meeting which was held on virtual basis.

Alpine skiers Jeffrey Webb and Aruwin Salehhuddin were the flagbearer during the opening ceremony. Webb was also the flagbearer during the closing ceremony.

== Competitors ==
The following is the list of number of competitors participating at the Games per sport/discipline.

| Sport | Men | Women | Total |
|---|---|---|---|
| Alpine skiing | 1 | 1 | 2 |
| Total | 1 | 1 | 2 |

== Alpine skiing ==
By meeting the basic qualification standards Malaysia qualified one male and one female alpine skier.

| Athlete | Event | Run 1 | | Run 2 | | Total | |
| Athlete | Event | Time | Rank | Time | Rank | Time | Rank |
|---|---|---|---|---|---|---|---|
| Jeffrey Webb | Men's slalom | DNF | | Did not advance | | | |
| Aruwin Salehhuddin | Women's giant slalom | 1:06.13 | 46 | 1:06.15 | 38 | 2:12.28 | 38 |
| Aruwin Salehhuddin | Women's slalom | DNF | | Did not advance | | | |

== See also ==
- Malaysia at the 2022 Commonwealth Games
- Tropical nations at the Winter Olympics
