= Pavel Golovishnikov =

Russian-Polish ice dancer

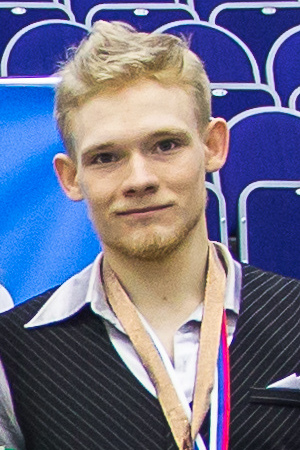
- Pavel Golovishnikov at the 2016 Russian Championships

Personal information
- Native name: Павел Сергеевич Головишников
- Full name: Pavel Sergeyevich Golovishnikov
- Other names: Golovishnokov
- Born: 12 July 1995 (age 30) Belgorod, Russia
- Home town: Toruń, Poland
- Height: 1.80 m (5 ft 11 in)

Figure skating career
- Country: Poland (since 2019); Russia (2012–19)
- Discipline: Ice dance
- Partner: Anastasia Polibina (since 2019); Ludmila Sosnitskaia (2012–19)
- Coach: Natalia Kaliszek-Wasik; Matteo Zanni
- Skating club: MKS Axel Toruń
- Began skating: 1998

Medal record
Representing Poland
Polish Championships
Gold medal – first place	2023 Budapest	Ice dance
Silver medal – second place	2021 Cieszyn	Ice dance
Silver medal – second place	2022 Spišská Nová Ves	Ice dance
Silver medal – second place	2025 Cieszyn	Ice dance
Bronze medal – third place	2020 Ostrava	Ice dance
Bronze medal – third place	2024 Turnov	Ice dance

Pavel Sergeyevich Golovishnikov (Russian: Павел Сергеевич Головишников; born 12 July 1995) is an ice dancer. Skating for Poland with Anastasia Polibina, he is the 2022 Bosphorus Cup champion, 2022 NRW Trophy silver medalist, and 2023 Polish national champion. Earlier in his career, he skated for Russia with Ludmila Sosnitskaia, winning bronze at the 2015 CS Denkova-Staviski Cup.

== Career ==
=== Early years ===
Golovishnikov began learning to skate in 1998. Early in his career, he represented Russia with Ludmila Sosnitskaia. Their partnership started in 2012 and lasted seven seasons. They made their junior international debut in November 2012, at the Grand Prize SNP in Banská Bystrica, Slovakia. Their senior international debut came in October 2014, at the Ice Star in Minsk, Belarus.

Sosnitskaia and Golovishnikov competed at five ISU Challenger Series events. In October 2015, the duo won bronze at the 2015 CS Denkova-Staviski Cup in Sofia, Bulgaria. They appeared at five senior Russian national championships, placing seventh twice and ninth three times.

They trained in Moscow, coached by Svetlana Alekseeva, Elena Kustarova, and Olga Riabinina. Their partnership ended following the 2018–19 season.

=== 2020–21 season ===
In 2020, Golovishnikov teamed up with Russian-born ice dancer Anastasia Polibina, who had started competing for Poland in 2015. The two decided to train in Toruń, under Sylwia Nowak-Trębacka, and to represent Poland. In December 2020, they became the Polish national silver medalists at the Four Nationals in Cieszyn. They had no appearances at ISU events in their first season together.

=== 2021–22 season ===
In October 2021, Polibina/Golovishnikov placed fourth at the Mezzaluna Cup in Italy and then won bronze at the Viktor Petrenko Cup in Odesa, Ukraine. In November, they finished 13th at the 2021 CS Warsaw Cup.

In December, competing at Four Nationals, they repeated as national silver medalists. They were assigned to the 2022 European Championships but withdrew before the event due to a positive test for SARS-CoV-2. They placed 28th at the 2022 World Championships, which took place in March in Montpellier, France.

=== 2022–23 season ===
In November, Polibina and Golovishnikov won the silver medal at the NRW Trophy in Germany. In December, they won gold at the Bosphorus Cup in Turkey and then claimed the Polish national title at the Four National Championships hosted by Hungary. They were subsequently nominated to compete at the 2023 European Championships in Espoo, Finland.

== Programs ==
=== With Polibina ===
Season	Rhythm dance	Free dance
2022–2023	Samba: Magalenha by Sérgio Mendes; Rhumba: Perfidia; Samba: Hip Hip Chin Chin	Feel It; Dad by Michele Morrone; Give 'em Hell by Everybody Loves an Outlaw
2021–2022	Swing: I Won't Dance by Willie Nelson, Diana Krall; Jazz: Love by Nat King Cole	Earned It by The Weeknd; Crazy in Love by Sofia Karlberg; Done for Me by Charlie Puth, Kehlani; Notre-Dame de Paris by Riccardo Cocciante, Luc Plamondon; Les Temps des Cathédrales performed by Richard Charest; Belle performed by Daniel Lavoie; Les Sans-Papiers performed by Luck Mervil

=== With Sosnitskaia ===
Season	Rhythm dance	Free dance
2017–2018	No Me Ames by Jennifer Lopez, Marc Anthony	Tonight by Elton John
2016–2017	Your Heart Is As Black As Night by Beth Hart	
2015–2016		
2014–2015		Les Misérables by Claude-Michel Schönberg

== Competitive highlights ==
- JGP – Event of the ISU Junior Grand Prix Series
- CS – Event of the ISU Challenger Series
- WD – Withdrew from competition

=== Ice dance with Anastasia Polibina (for Poland) ===
Competition placements at senior level
Season	2019–20	2020–21	2021–22	2022–23	2023–24	2024–25
World Championships			28th	22nd		
European Championships				16th		
Polish Championships	3rd	2nd	2nd	1st	3rd	2nd
Four Nationals Championships	3rd	2nd	5th	3rd	7th	7th
CS Budapest Trophy				10th	16th	
CS Denis Ten Memorial					9th	
CS Nepela Memorial				10th		
CS Warsaw Cup			13th	5th	WD	18th
Bosphorus Cup				1st	14th	
Mezzaluna Cup			4th		12th	
NRW Trophy				2nd		9th
Viktor Petrenko Cup			3rd			

=== With Sosnitskaia for Russia ===
International
Event	12–13	13–14	14–15	15–16	16–17	17–18	18–19
CS Denkova-Staviski				3rd			
CS Mordovian				7th			
CS Tallinn Trophy					11th	7th	
CS Volvo Open Cup			8th				
Ice Star			7th				
Volvo Open Cup						6th	
International: Junior
Grand Prize SNP	5th						
Ice Star		5th					
Volvo Open Cup		5th					
National
Russian Champ.			7th	7th	9th	9th	9th
Russian Jr. Champ.		14th					
