= 2015 CS Denkova-Staviski Cup =

2015 Denkova-Staviski Cup
- Type: ISU Challenger Series
- Date: 20 – 25 October 2015
- Season: 2015–16
- Location: Sofia, Bulgaria
- Host: Bulgarian Skating Federation
- Venue: Winter Sports Palace

Champions
- Men's singles: (Uzbekistan) Misha Ge
- Ladies' singles: (Sweden) Isabelle Olsson
- Ice dance: (Turkey) Alisa Agafonova / Alper Uçar

The 2015 Denkova-Staviski Cup was a senior international figure skating competition held in October 2015 at the Winter Sports Palace in Sofia, Bulgaria. It was part of the 2015–16 ISU Challenger Series. Medals were awarded in the disciplines of men's singles, ladies' singles, and ice dancing.

== Entries ==
The preliminary entries were published on 6 October 2015.

Country	Men	Ladies	Ice dance
Armenia	Slavik Hayrapetyan		
Australia		Brooklee Han	
Austria		Kerstin Frank	Barbora Silná / Juri Kurakin
Belarus			Viktoria Kavaliova / Yurii Bieliaiev
Bulgaria	Iassen Petkov	Daniela Stoeva; Hristina Vassileva	
Estonia		Johanna Allik	
Finland		Beata Papp	
France	Romain Ponsart		Mathilde Dias / Jean-Denis Sanchis
Germany	Franz Streubel		
Italy	Dario Betti; Matteo Rizzo	Roberta Rodeghiero; Guia Maria Tagliapietra	Misato Komatsubara / Andrea Fabbri
Kazakhstan	Abzal Rakimgaliev		
Latvia		Angelīna Kučvaļska	Olga Jakushina / Andrey Nevskiy
Malaysia	Julian Zhi Jie Yee		
Norway		Anne Line Gjersem	
Poland	Krzysztof Gała		
Russia			Ludmila Sosnitskaia / Pavel Golovishnikov
South Korea		Kim Kyu-eun; Son Suh-hyun	
Sweden		Isabelle Olsson	
Turkey		Birce Atabey; Sinem Kuyucu	Alisa Agafonova / Alper Uçar
Uzbekistan	Misha Ge		

== Senior results ==
=== Men ===
Rank	Name	Nation	Total	SP		FS	
1	Misha Ge	Uzbekistan	210.14	2	65.65	1	144.49
2	Julian Zhi Jie Yee	Malaysia	197.42	1	67.24	3	130.18
3	Matteo Rizzo	Italy	194.41	4	59.44	2	134.97
4	Franz Streubel	Germany	193.94	3	65.48	4	128.46
5	Dario Betti	Italy	166.48	6	56.52	5	109.96
6	Abzal Rakimgaliev	Kazakhstan	159.75	5	58.98	6	100.77
7	Krzysztof Gała	Poland	146.97	7	47.50	7	99.47
8	Slavik Hayrapetyan	Armenia	145.34	8	47.05	8	98.29
9	Iassen Petkov	Bulgaria	116.66	9	35.76	9	80.90
WD	Romain Ponsart	France	withdrew from competition				

=== Ladies ===
Rank	Name	Nation	Total	SP		FS	
1	Isabelle Olsson	Sweden	164.27	2	55.79	1	108.48
2	Angelīna Kučvaļska	Latvia	163.26	3	55.22	2	108.04
3	Anne Line Gjersem	Norway	156.71	1	56.12	3	100.59
4	Roberta Rodeghiero	Italy	149.81	6	49.50	4	100.31
5	Kerstin Frank	Austria	149.57	4	52.14	5	97.43
6	Brooklee Han	Australia	145.16	5	50.95	6	94.21
7	Son Suh-hyun	South Korea	133.81	9	44.03	7	89.78
8	Johanna Allik	Estonia	130.96	8	44.69	8	86.27
9	Kim Kyu-eun	South Korea	130.85	7	48.67	9	82.18
10	Birce Atabey	Turkey	114.73	10	38.22	10	76.51
11	Beata Papp	Finland	113.93	11	37.67	11	76.26
12	Sinem Kuyucu	Turkey	101.95	13	33.84	12	68.11
13	Hristina Vassileva	Bulgaria	92.44	12	35.20	13	57.24
14	Daniela Stoeva	Bulgaria	76.27	14	26.90	14	49.37
WD	Guia Maria Tagliapietra	Italy	withdrew from competition				

=== Ice dancing ===
Rank	Name	Nation	Total	SD		FD	
1	Alisa Agafonova / Alper Uçar	Turkey	151.74	1	58.76	1	92.98
2	Viktoria Kavaliova / Yurii Bieliaiev	Belarus	148.08	2	57.62	2	90.46
3	Ludmila Sosnitskaia / Pavel Golovishnikov	Russia	136.38	4	52.66	3	83.72
4	Misato Komatsubara / Andrea Fabbri	Italy	130.88	5	48.14	4	82.74
5	Barbora Silná / Juri Kurakin	Austria	129.26	3	56.32	6	72.94
6	Olga Jakushina / Andrey Nevskiy	Latvia	119.40	6	44.94	5	74.46
7	Mathilde Dias / Jean-Denis Sanchis	France	91.26	7	36.70	7	54.56
