= Spain at the 2018 Winter Olympics =

- IOC code: ESP
- NOC: Spanish Olympic Committee
- Website: www.coe.es (in Spanish)

in Pyeongchang, South Korea 9–25 February 2018
- Competitors: 13 (11 men and 2 women) in 5 sports
- Flag bearer: Lucas Eguibar
- Medals Ranked 26th: Gold 0 Silver 0 Bronze 2 Total 2

Winter Olympics appearances (overview)
- 1936; 1948; 1952; 1956; 1960; 1964; 1968; 1972; 1976; 1980; 1984; 1988; 1992; 1994; 1998; 2002; 2006; 2010; 2014; 2018; 2022; 2026

Spain competed at the 2018 Winter Olympics in Pyeongchang, South Korea, from 9 to 25 February 2018.

On 15 February, Regino Hernández became Spain's first Winter Olympic medalist in 26 years (since the 1992 Winter Olympics) when he won the bronze medal in men's snowboard cross. He also became the first ever Olympic medalist in snowboarding for Spain, with all previous Spanish Winter Olympic medals coming from alpine skiing disciplines.

On 17 February, Javier Fernández won Spain's first ever Olympic medal in ice sports when he won the bronze medal in the men's single figure skating competition.

These achievements made this edition Spain's most successful Winter Olympics to date in terms of total medal count. For the first time, both Spanish sports federations in charge of winter sports (Real Federación Española de Deportes de Invierno and Federación Española de Deportes de Hielo) got medals in the same Winter Olympics.

== Medalists ==
Medal	Name	Sport	Event	Date
Bronze	Regino Hernández	Snowboarding	Men's snowboard cross	15 February
Bronze	Javier Fernández	Figure skating	Men's singles	17 February

== Competitors ==
The following is the list of a number of competitors participating in the Games per sport/discipline.

Sport	Men	Women	Total
Alpine skiing	2	0	2
Cross-country skiing	2	0	2
Figure skating	3	1	4
Skeleton	1	0	1
Snowboarding	3	1	4
Total	11	2	13

== Alpine skiing ==
Athlete	Event	Run 1		Run 2		Total	
Athlete	Event	Time	Rank	Time	Rank	Time	Rank
Juan del Campo	Men's giant slalom	1:13.39	39	DNF			
Juan del Campo	Men's slalom	DNF					
Joaquim Salarich	Men's slalom	52.07	33	DNF			

== Cross-country skiing ==
Spain qualified two male athletes.

Distance

Athlete	Event	Classical		Freestyle		Final		
Athlete	Event	Time	Rank	Time	Rank	Time	Deficit	Rank
Imanol Rojo	Men's 15 km freestyle	—N/a				37:35.5	+3:51.6	62
Imanol Rojo	Men's 30 km skiathlon	43:27.4	49	39:05.3	54	1:23:06.5	+6:46.5	49
Imanol Rojo	Men's 50 km classical	—N/a				2:19:10.1	+10:48.0	35
Martí Vigo del Arco	Men's 15 km freestyle	—N/a				DNF		

Sprint

Athlete	Event	Semifinal		Final	
Athlete	Event	Time	Rank	Time	Rank
Imanol Rojo; Martí Vigo del Arco	Men's team sprint	16:59.83	10	Did not advance	

== Figure skating ==
Based on placements in the 2017 World Figure Skating Championships in Helsinki, Finland, Spain qualified 4 athletes (3 male and 1 female) in the men's singles and ice dancing events. One of the men's quotas was directly given to Javier Fernández, the other men's quota and the ice dance quota was decided according to the 2017 CS Golden Spin of Zagreb and the National Championships results.

Athlete	Event	SP / SD		FS / FD		Total	
Athlete	Event	Points	Rank	Points	Rank	Points	Rank
Javier Fernández	Men's singles	107.58	2 Q	197.66	4	305.24	3rd place, bronze medalist(s)
Felipe Montoya	Men's singles	52.41	29	Did not advance			
Sara Hurtado / Kirill Khaliavin	Ice dancing	66.93	12 Q	101.40	11	168.33	12

== Skeleton ==
Spain qualified one male athlete.

Athlete	Event	Run 1		Run 2		Run 3		Run 4		Total	
Athlete	Event	Time	Rank	Time	Rank	Time	Rank	Time	Rank	Time	Rank
Ander Mirambell	Men's	51.64	21	52.06	26	51.59	22	Eliminated		2:35.29	23

== Snowboarding ==
Freestyle

Athlete	Event	Qualification				Final				
Athlete	Event	Run 1	Run 2	Best	Rank	Run 1	Run 2	Run 3	Best	Rank
Queralt Castellet	Women's halfpipe	71.50	45.50	71.50	5 Q	59.75	67.75	43.75	67.75	7

Qualification Legend: Q – Qualify to final

Snowboard cross

Athlete	Event	Seeding						1/8 final	Quarterfinal	Semifinal	Final	
Athlete	Event	Run 1		Run 2		Best	Seed	1/8 final	Quarterfinal	Semifinal	Final	
Athlete	Event	Time	Rank	Time	Rank	Best	Seed	Position	Position	Position	Position	Rank
Lucas Eguibar	Men's snowboard cross	1:18.42	36	1:14.45	2	1:14.45	26	DNF	did not advance			
Regino Hernández	Men's snowboard cross	1:13.67	3	Bye		1:13.67	3	3 Q	1 Q	1 FA	3	3rd place, bronze medalist(s)
Laro Herrero	Men's snowboard cross	1:17.62	35	1:16.97	11	1:16.97	37	5	did not advance			

Qualification legend: Q – Qualify to next round, FA – Qualify to medal round; FB – Qualify to consolation round.
