= Figure skating at the 2018 Winter Olympics =

Figure skating at the XXIII Olympic Winter Games
- Venue: Gangneung Ice Arena; Gangneung, South Korea
- Dates: 9–23 February 2018
- No. of events: 5
- Competitors: 153 (76 men, 77 women) from 32 nations

The figure skating events at the 2018 Winter Olympics took place from 9 to 23 February 2018 at the Gangneung Ice Arena in Gangneung, South Korea, and featured 153 skaters from 32 nations. Medals were awarded in men's singles, women's singles, pair skating, ice dance, and the team event. Yuzuru Hanyu of Japan won the men's event; Alina Zagitova, representing the Olympic Athletes from Russia, won the women's event; Aljona Savchenko and Bruno Massot of Germany won the pairs event; Tessa Virtue and Scott Moir of Canada won the ice dance event; and the team from Canada won the team event. Several world record scores in figure skating were set at the Olympics, including by Savchenko and Massot in the pairs event; Evgenia Medvedeva and Zagitova in the women's event; and both Virtue and Moir, and Gabriella Papadakis and Guillaume Cizeron, in the ice dance event. Virtue and Moir, who had previously won medals in both the ice dance and team events in 2010 and 2014, became the most decorated figure skaters in Olympic history.

== Background ==
In 2016, an independent report commissioned by the World Anti-Doping Agency confirmed allegations that the Russian Olympic team had been involved in a state-sponsored doping program from at least late 2011 through February 2014, when Russia hosted the Winter Olympics in Sochi. On 5 December 2017, the International Olympic Committee announced that the Russian Olympic Committee had been suspended from the 2018 Winter Olympics. Athletes with no previous drug violations and a consistent history of drug testing were allowed to compete under the Olympic flag as an "Olympic Athlete from Russia" (OAR). Under the terms of the decree, neither the Russian flag nor anthem would be allowed at the Olympics; the Olympic flag and Olympic Anthem were used instead.

A total of five figure skating events were contested: men's singles, women's singles, pair skating, ice dance, and the team event. All events were held from 9 to 23 February at the Gangneung Ice Arena in Gangneung, South Korea. The International Skating Union modified its rules after the 2014 Winter Olympics to allow for vocal music in single and pair skating. The 2018 Winter Olympics were the first to feature vocal music in all skating disciplines; performances in ice dance had been permitted to use vocal music since the 1990s.

== Qualification ==
A total of 144 quota spots were available to athletes to compete in figure skating at the 2018 Winter Olympics. Each National Olympic Committee (NOC) was allowed to enter a maximum of 18 skaters, with a maximum of nine men or nine women. The results of the 2017 World Figure Skating Championships determined 83 total spots: 24 entries each in men's and women's singles, 16 in pair skating, and 19 in ice dance. The remaining quota spots were allocated based on the results of the 2017 Nebelhorn Trophy.

Number of qualified skaters or teams per nation
Nations	Men's singles	Women's singles	Pairs	Ice dance	Team event	Add.	Total
Australia	1	1	1	0			4
Austria	0	0	1	0			2
Belgium	1	1	0	0			2
Brazil	0	1	0	0			1
Canada	2	3	3	3	Yes		17
China	2	1	3	1	Yes		11
Czech Republic	1	0	1	1			5
Finland	0	1	0	0			1
France	1	1	1	2	Yes		8
Georgia	1	0	0	0			1
Germany	1	1	2	1	Yes		8
Great Britain	0	0	0	1			2
Hungary	0	1	0	0			1
Israel	2	0	1	1	Yes	1 (Note: Aimee Buchanan of Israel competed in the team event, but not the women's individual event.)	7
Italy	1	2	2	2	Yes		11
Japan	3	2	1	1	Yes		9
Kazakhstan	1	2	0	0			3
Latvia	1	1	0	0			2
Malaysia	1	0	0	0			1
North Korea	0	0	1	0			2
Philippines	1	0	0	0			1
Poland	0	0	0	1			2
Olympic Athletes from Russia	2	3	3	2	Yes		15
Slovakia	0	1	0	1			3
South Korea	1	2	1	1	Yes		7
Spain	2	0	0	1			4
Sweden	0	1	0	0			1
Switzerland	0	1	0	0			1
Turkey	0	0	0	1			2
Ukraine	1	1	0	1			4
United States	3	3	1	3	Yes		14
Uzbekistan	1	0	0	0			1
Total: 32 NOCs	30	30	22 teams	24 teams	10 teams	1	153

=== Team event ===
For the team event, scores from the 2017 World Championships and the 2017–18 Grand Prix of Figure Skating season were tabulated to establish the top ten nations.

Qualification for figure skating team event
Pl.	Nation	M	W	P	D	Total
1	Canada	Yes	Yes	Yes	Yes	6084
2	(International Olympic Committee) OAR	Yes	Yes	Yes	Yes	5924
3	United States	Yes	Yes	Yes	Yes	5055
4	Japan	Yes	Yes	Yes	Yes	4345
5	China	Yes	Yes	Yes	Yes	4231
6	Italy	Yes	Yes	Yes	Yes	3801
7	France	Yes	Yes	Yes	Yes	3652
8	Germany	Yes	Yes	Yes	Yes	2806
9	Israel	Yes	(Note: Although Israel did not qualify a women's singles skater for the team event, they were able to use the Additional Athletes Quota to complete their team.)	Yes	Yes	1521
10	South Korea	Yes	Yes	(Note: Although South Korea did not qualify a pair skating team through the normal process, as the host nation, they were still able to enter a team in the 2018 Winter Olympics.)	Yes	1397

== Entries ==
Countries began announcing their entries following the 2017 World Championships. The International Skating Union published the complete list on 30 January 2018. Skaters or teams denoted with ● were eligible for the team event only. This was the first time that Malaysia had ever qualified for a figure skating event at the Winter Olympics; the Olympic Council of Malaysia chose to send Julian Yee.

North Korea originally qualified one quota spot in pair skating after Ryom Tae-ok and Kim Ju-sik finished in sixth place at the 2017 Nebelhorn Trophy. However, after North Korea missed the deadline to submit their entries for the Olympics, their spot was re-allocated to Japan. Following negotiations with South Korea – the first in more than two years – North Korea agreed to "actively cooperate" at the Olympics. and on 20 January, the International Olympic Committee (IOC) announced that, as part of the "Olympic Korean Peninsula Declaration", they had granted accreditation to North Korea for twenty-two athletes to compete at the Olympics and allocated an additional quota spot in pair skating for Ryom and Kim. In addition, the IOC approved the request of the North and South Korean Olympic committees to allow the two delegations to enter the arena together under the name "Korea" during the opening ceremony. Thomas Bach, then-president of the IOC, stated: "The Olympic spirit is about respect, dialogue and understanding. The Olympic Winter Games PyeongChang 2018 are hopefully opening the door to a brighter future on the Korean peninsula, and inviting the world to join in a celebration of hope."

Entries
Nation	Men	Women	Pairs	Ice dance	Ref.
Australia	Brendan Kerry	Kailani Craine	Ekaterina Alexandrovskaya; Harley Windsor	—N/a	
Austria	—N/a		Miriam Ziegler; Severin Kiefer	—N/a	
Belgium	Jorik Hendrickx	Loena Hendrickx	—N/a		
Brazil	—N/a	Isadora Williams	—N/a		
Canada	Patrick Chan	Larkyn Austman	Meagan Duhamel; Eric Radford	Piper Gilles; Paul Poirier	
Canada	Keegan Messing	Gabrielle Daleman	Kirsten Moore-Towers; Michael Marinaro	Tessa Virtue; Scott Moir	
Canada	—N/a	Kaetlyn Osmond	Julianne Séguin; Charlie Bilodeau	Kaitlyn Weaver; Andrew Poje	
China	Jin Boyang	Li Xiangning	Peng Cheng; Jin Yang	Wang Shiyue; Liu Xinyu	
China	Yan Han	—N/a	Sui Wenjing; Han Cong	—N/a	
China	—N/a	—N/a	Yu Xiaoyu; Zhang Hao	—N/a	
Czech Republic	Michal Březina	—N/a	Anna Dušková; Martin Bidař	Cortney Mansour; Michal Češka	
Finland	—N/a	Emmi Peltonen	—N/a		
France	Chafik Besseghier	Maé-Bérénice Méité	Vanessa James; Morgan Ciprès	Gabriella Papadakis; Guillaume Cizeron	
France	—N/a			Marie-Jade Lauriault; Romain Le Gac	
Georgia	Morisi Kvitelashvili	—N/a			
Germany	Paul Fentz	Nicole Schott	Annika Hocke; Ruben Blommaert	Kavita Lorenz; Joti Polizoakis	
Germany	—N/a		Aljona Savchenko; Bruno Massot	—N/a	
Great Britain	—N/a			Penny Coomes; Nicholas Buckland	
Hungary	—N/a	Ivett Tóth	—N/a		
Israel	Oleksii Bychenko	Aimee Buchanan ●	Paige Conners; Evgeni Krasnopolski	Adel Tankova; Ronald Zilberberg	
Israel	Daniel Samohin	—N/a			
Italy	Matteo Rizzo	Carolina Kostner	Nicole Della Monica; Matteo Guarise	Anna Cappellini; Luca Lanotte	
Italy	—N/a	Giada Russo	Valentina Marchei; Ondřej Hotárek	Charlène Guignard; Marco Fabbri	
Japan	Yuzuru Hanyu	Satoko Miyahara	Miu Suzaki; Ryuichi Kihara	Kana Muramoto; Chris Reed	
Japan	Keiji Tanaka	Kaori Sakamoto	—N/a		
Japan	Shoma Uno	—N/a	—N/a		
Kazakhstan	Denis Ten	Aiza Mambekova	—N/a		
Kazakhstan	—N/a	Elizabet Tursynbaeva	—N/a		
Latvia	Deniss Vasiļjevs	Diāna Ņikitina	—N/a		
Malaysia	Julian Yee	—N/a			
North Korea	—N/a		Ryom Tae-ok; Kim Ju-sik	—N/a	
Olympic Athletes from Russia	Dmitri Aliev	Evgenia Medvedeva	Kristina Astakhova; Alexei Rogonov	Ekaterina Bobrova; Dmitri Soloviev	
Olympic Athletes from Russia	Mikhail Kolyada	Maria Sotskova	Evgenia Tarasova; Vladimir Morozov	Tiffany Zahorski; Jonathan Guerreiro	
Olympic Athletes from Russia	—N/a	Alina Zagitova	Natalia Zabiiako; Alexander Enbert	—N/a	
Philippines	Michael Christian Martinez	—N/a			
Poland	—N/a			Natalia Kaliszek; Maksym Spodyriev	
Slovakia	—N/a	Nicole Rajičová	—N/a	Lucie Myslivečková; Lukáš Csölley	
South Korea	Cha Jun-hwan	Choi Da-bin	Kim Kyu-eun; Alex Kangchan Kam	Yura Min; Alexander Gamelin	
South Korea	—N/a	Kim Ha-nul	—N/a		
Spain	Javier Fernández	—N/a		Sara Hurtado; Kirill Khaliavin	
Spain	Felipe Montoya	—N/a		—N/a	
Sweden	—N/a	Anita Östlund	—N/a		
Switzerland	—N/a	Alexia Paganini	—N/a		
Turkey	—N/a			Alisa Agafonova; Alper Uçar	
Ukraine	Yaroslav Paniot	Anna Khnychenkova	—N/a	Oleksandra Nazarova; Maksym Nikitin	
United States	Nathan Chen	Karen Chen	Alexa Scimeca Knierim; Chris Knierim	Madison Chock; Evan Bates	
United States	Adam Rippon	Mirai Nagasu	—N/a	Madison Hubbell; Zachary Donohue	
United States	Vincent Zhou	Bradie Tennell	—N/a	Maia Shibutani; Alex Shibutani	
Uzbekistan	Misha Ge	—N/a			

== Competition schedule ==
Figure skating events schedule
Date	Time	Event
9 February	10:00	Team event (men's short program)
9 February	10:00	Team event (pairs short program)
11 February	10:00	Team event (ice dance short dance)
11 February	10:00	Team event (women's short program)
11 February	10:00	Team event (pairs free skating)
12 February	10:00	Team event (men's free skating)
12 February	10:00	Team event (women's free skating)
12 February	10:00	Team event (ice dance free dance)
14 February	10:00	Pairs short program
15 February	10:30	Pairs free skating
16 February	10:00	Men's short program
17 February	10:00	Men's free skating
19 February	10:00	Ice dance short dance
20 February	10:00	Ice dance free dance
21 February	10:00	Women's short program
23 February	10:00	Women's free skating
25 February	9:30	Gala exhibition

== Medal summary ==
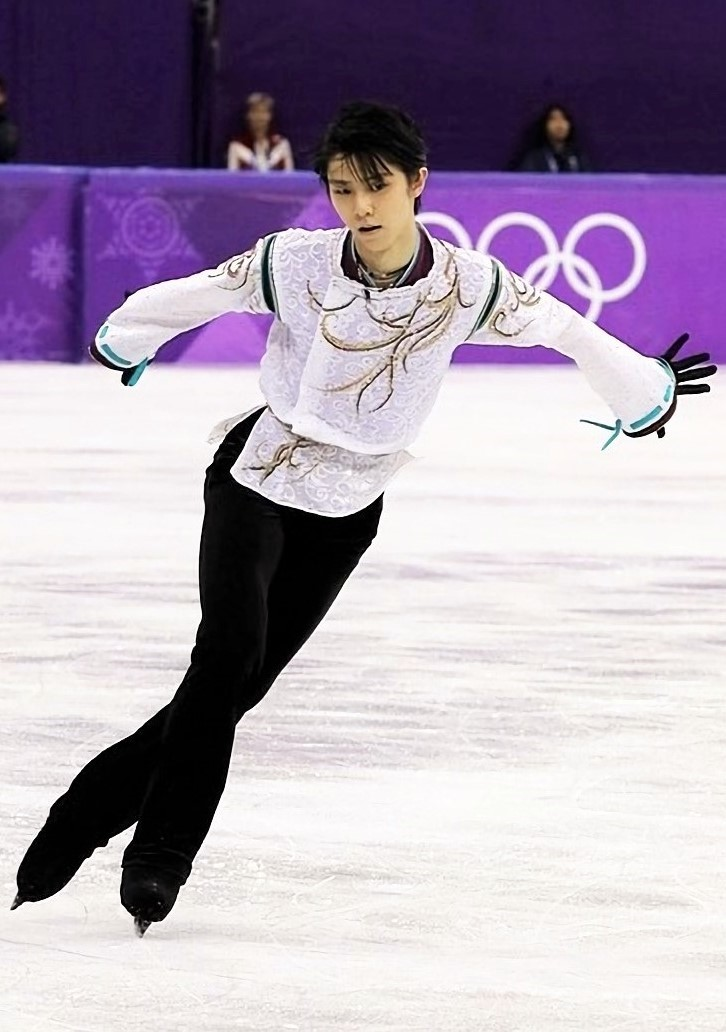
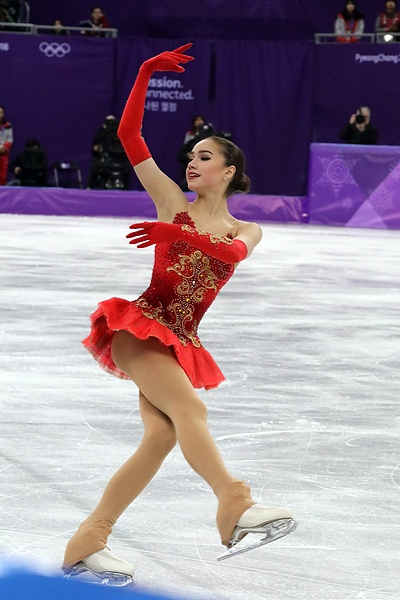
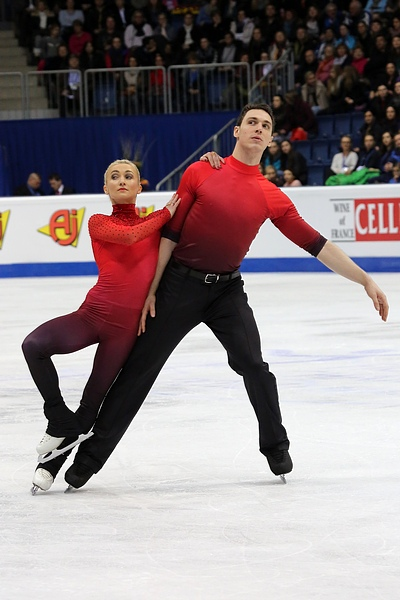
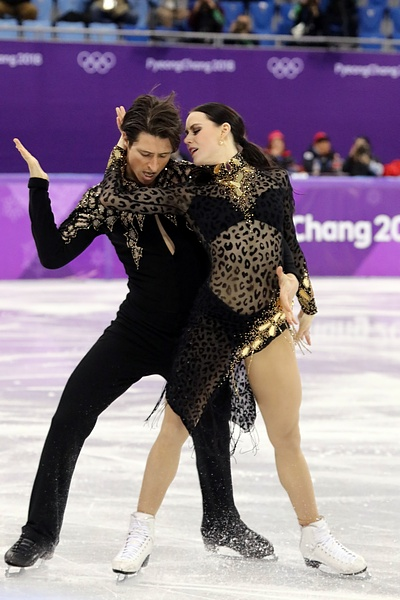
The 2018 Olympic figure skating champions (from left to right):
Yuzuru Hanyu of Japan (men's singles); Alina Zagitova of Russia (women's singles); Aljona Savchenko and Bruno Massot of Germany (pair skating); and Tessa Virtue and Scott Moir of Canada (ice dance)

=== Medalists ===
Javier Fernández's bronze medal was the first ever Olympic medal in figure skating for Spain.

Olympic medalists
Discipline	Gold	Silver	Bronze	Ref.
Men's singles	Yuzuru Hanyu; Japan	Shoma Uno; Japan	Javier Fernández; Spain	
Women's singles	Alina Zagitova (International Olympic Committee) OAR	Evgenia Medvedeva (International Olympic Committee) OAR	Kaetlyn Osmond; Canada	
Pairs	Aljona Savchenko; Bruno Massot; Germany	Sui Wenjing; Han Cong; China	Meagan Duhamel; Eric Radford; Canada	
Ice dance	Tessa Virtue; Scott Moir; Canada	Gabriella Papadakis; Guillaume Cizeron; France	Maia Shibutani; Alex Shibutani; United States	
Team event	Canada; Patrick Chan; Kaetlyn Osmond; Gabrielle Daleman; Meagan Duhamel; Eric Radford; Tessa Virtue; Scott Moir	(International Olympic Committee) OAR; Mikhail Kolyada; Evgenia Medvedeva; Alina Zagitova; Evgenia Tarasova; Vladimir Morozov; Natalia Zabiiako; Alexander Enbert; Ekaterina Bobrova; Dmitri Soloviev	United States; Nathan Chen; Adam Rippon; Bradie Tennell; Mirai Nagasu; Alexa Scimeca Knierim; Chris Knierim; Maia Shibutani; Alex Shibutani	

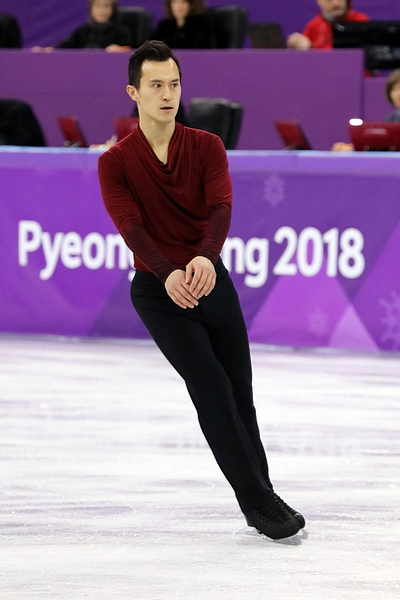
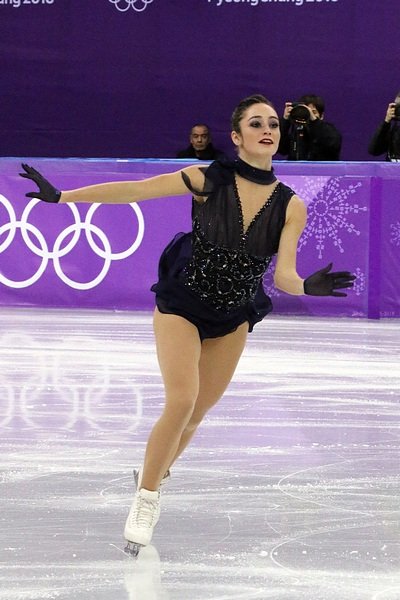
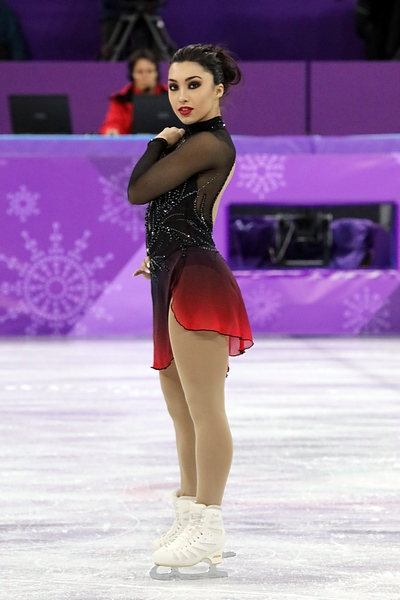
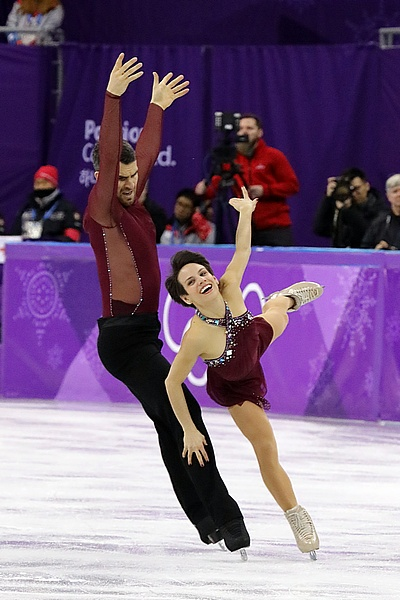
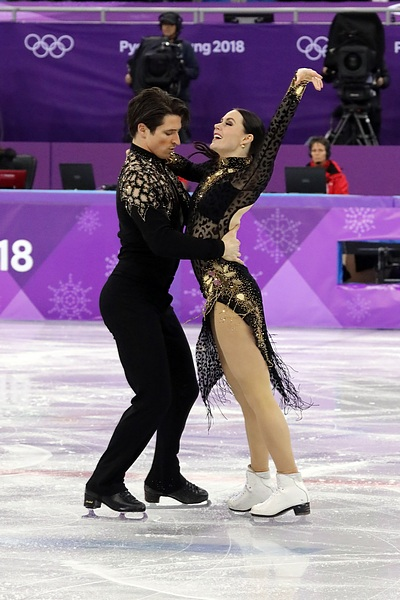
The Canadian figure skating team and gold medalists from the 2018 Winter Olympics (from left to right):
Patrick Chan; Kaetlyn Osmond; Gabrielle Daleman; Meagan Duhamel and Eric Radford; and Tessa Virtue and Scott Moir

=== Medal table ===
Rank	Nation	Gold	Silver	Bronze	Total
1	Canada	2	0	2	4
2	(International Olympic Committee) OAR	1	2	0	3
3	Japan	1	1	0	2
4	Germany	1	0	0	1
5	China	0	1	0	1
5	France	0	1	0	1
7	United States	0	0	2	2
8	Spain	0	0	1	1
Totals (8 entries)		5	5	5	15

== Records ==
The following new record high scores were set during this competition. Additionally, Tessa Virtue and Scott Moir of Canada became the most decorated figure skaters in Olympic history, having won medals in the ice dance event in 2010 and the ice dance and team events in 2014, in addition to their two gold medals in 2018.

Record high scores
Date	Skater(s)	Event	Segment	Score	Ref.
11 February	(International Olympic Committee) Evgenia Medvedeva (OAR)	Team event (Women's singles)	Short program	81.06	
15 February	(Germany); Aljona Savchenko; Bruno Massot	Pair skating	Free skate	159.31	
19 February	(Canada); Tessa Virtue; Scott Moir	Ice dance	Short dance	83.67	
20 February	(France); Gabriella Papadakis; Guillaume Cizeron	Ice dance	Free dance	123.35	
20 February	(France); Gabriella Papadakis; Guillaume Cizeron	Ice dance	Total score	205.28	
20 February	(Canada); Tessa Virtue; Scott Moir	Ice dance	Total score	206.07	
21 February	(International Olympic Committee) Evgenia Medvedeva (OAR)	Women's singles	Short program	81.61	
21 February	(International Olympic Committee) Alina Zagitova (OAR)	Women's singles	Short program	82.92	

== Aftermath ==
Alina Zagitova received criticism for backloading her free skate – that is, waiting until the second half of her program to perform her jumps, because jumps performed in the second half of a program received bonus points. Christine Brennan, a sports reporter for USA Today, described Evgenia Medvedeva as the "best example of a complete skater, a masterful jumper and expressive artist". Conversely, she described Zagitova as the "best example of a physically gifted opportunist, racking up valuable points any which way she can". Brennan further speculated that the International Skating Union (ISU) would likely change their rules to prevent future skaters from doing what Zagitova did. Indeed, at the 57th meeting of the ISU Congress in 2018, the ISU limited the number of jump elements that a skater could execute for a bonus in the back half of a performance to one in the short program and three in the free skate. This has colloquially been referred to as the "Zagitova rule".

The ISU launched an investigation into two Chinese judges following the 2018 Winter Olympics: Chen Weiguang, who had been a judge in the men's event, and Huang Feng, who had been a judge in the pairs event. Both were found to have given "preferential marking" to Chinese skaters and deliberately low scores to their strongest competitors. As a result, Huang received a one-year suspension from judging, while Chen received a two-year suspension and was barred from judging at the 2022 Winter Olympics in Beijing. The ISU described the behavior of both judges as "one of the most serious ethical offences" that a judge can commit.

== Works cited ==
- "Qualification System for the XXIII Olympic Winter Games PyeongChang 2018". International Skating Union. 17 May 2016. Archived from the original on 29 September 2017.
