= Malaysia at the 2026 Winter Olympics =

- Flag of Malaysia
- IOC code: MAS
- NOC: Olympic Council of Malaysia
- Website: www.olympic.org.my

in Milan and Cortina d'Ampezzo, Italy 6 February 2026 – 22 February 2026
- Competitors: 1 (1 woman) in 1 sport
- Flag bearer (opening): Aruwin Salehhuddin
- Flag bearer (closing): Aruwin Salehhuddin
- Medals: Gold 0 Silver 0 Bronze 0 Total 0

Winter Olympics appearances (overview)
- 2018; 2022; 2026

Malaysia competed at the 2026 Winter Olympics in Milan and Cortina d'Ampezzo, Italy, from 6 to 22 February 2026. This was the country's third appearance at the Winter Olympics and also the third consecutive time since their first appearance at the 2018 Winter Olympics.

The Malaysian team consisted of one female alpine skier. Alpine skier Aruwin Salehhuddin was the country's flagbearer during the opening ceremony. Meanwhile, Salehhuddin was also the country's flagbearer during the closing ceremony.

== Competitors ==
The following is the list of number of competitors participating at the Games per sport/discipline.

Sport	Men	Women	Total
Alpine skiing	0	1	1
Total	0	1	1

== Alpine skiing ==
Malaysia qualified one female alpine skier through the basic quota.

Aruwin Salehhuddin got a DNF in run 1 of the Women's giant slalom by going wide of the section of the Pale Di Rumerlo section and therefore was not able to put up a score in the second run.

Athlete	Event	Run 1		Run 2		Total	
Athlete	Event	Time	Rank	Time	Rank	Time	Rank
Aruwin Salehhuddin	Women's giant slalom	DNF					
Aruwin Salehhuddin	Women's slalom	55.09	54	59.73	44	1:54.82	44
