= Julian Yee =

Malaysian figure skater

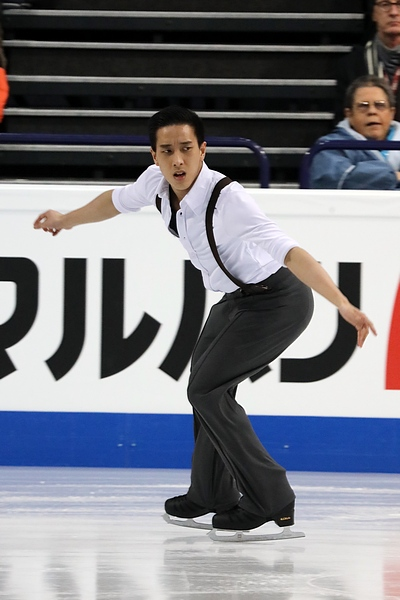
- Yee at the 2017 Worlds

Personal information
- Full name: Julian Yee Zhi Jie
- Other names: Julian Zhi Jie Yee
- Born: 26 May 1997 (age 29) Kuala Lumpur, Malaysia
- Height: 1.67 m (5 ft 6 in)

Figure skating career
- Country: Malaysia
- Coach: Michael Hopfes; Doug Leigh
- Skating club: Ice Skating Association of Malaysia
- Began skating: 2001
Medal record
Representing Malaysia
Men’s figure skating
Southeast Asian Games
Gold medal – first place	2017 Kuala Lumpur	Men’s singles
Gold medal – first place	2019 Philippines	Men’s singles

Julian Yee
- Traditional Chinese: 茹自傑
- Simplified Chinese: 茹自杰
Transcriptions
Standard Mandarin
- Hanyu Pinyin: Rú Zì Jié

Julian Yee Zhi Jie (Chinese: 茹自杰; pinyin: Rú Zì Jié, born 26 May 1997) is a Malaysian figure skater. He is also the first Olympian Malaysian figure skater. He is the 2017 and 2019 Southeast Asian Games gold medalist, 2015 CS Denkova-Staviski Cup silver medalist, 2016 Asian Open Figure Skating Trophy and 2013 Skate Down Under bronze medalist, as well as five-time Malaysian senior national champion (2013–2017). He has competed in the final segment at ten ISU Championships, including four World Championships. He represented Malaysia at the 2018 Winter Olympics.

== Personal life ==
Julian Yee Zhi Jie was born on 26 May 1997 in Kuala Lumpur, Malaysia. His mother, Irene Cheow, served as the deputy president of the Ice Skating Association of Malaysia from 2012 to 2014. He has two brothers, Ian and Ryan Yee Zhi Jwen. Ryan had also competed internationally in figure skating.

== Career ==
=== Early life ===
Julian Yee began learning to skate at age four at the Sunway Pyramid Ice Rink in Malaysia. He and his brothers were introduced to skating by their mother, Irene. Harry Janto Leo became his coach in 2004.

During his early years, Yee competed only in ISI-sanctioned competitions, which were regarded as recreational skating. He won the elementary category at the inaugural Malaysian National Championships and defended his title the following year. He learned all his double jumps by the age of twelve. He was selected by Ice Skating Association of Malaysia to participate in the 2009 Korean Dream Program in PyeongChang.

In 2010, Yee received additional coaching from Chen Lu and Denis Petrov. In 2011, he became the youngest skater to win the Junior Men's category, at age 13 years 10 months, thereby breaking the previous record held by his brother, Ryan Yee Zhi Jwen.

=== 2011–12 to 2012–13 ===
In the 2011–12 season, Yee was selected to represent Malaysia in the ISU Junior Grand Prix. He competed at events in Milan, Italy and Tallinn, Estonia, but failed to reach the free skate.

In 2013, Yee became first Malaysian to obtain the qualifying scores for the World Junior Championships. He finished 34th in the short program and did not qualify for the free skate. He learned most of the triple jumps by sixteen.

=== 2013–14 to 2014–15 ===
In 2014, Yee became the first Malaysian to reach the free skate at a Four Continents Championships. One of the youngest skaters at the event, held in Taipei City from 20–25 January 2014, he qualified for the free skate and finished 23rd overall. At the 2014 Malaysian Open National Championship, Yee held the lead after the short program and defended his title to become only the second Malaysian skater to win the Senior Men's title in consecutive years.

In the 2014–15 JGP season, Yee finished sixth in Aichi, Japan, scoring personal bests in the short program, free skate, and combined total. In March 2015, competing at his fourth World Junior Championships, he qualified for the free skate and finished 19th overall. He also managed to qualify for Malaysia their first ever Youth Winter Olympics spot but he was not able to compete in it as he was over-aged.

=== 2015–16 season ===
Yee started the 2015–16 JGP season with a 7th-place result in Riga, Latvia, scoring personal bests in the short, free skate and combined total (176.79). After placing first in the junior category at the 2015 Skate Canada Summer Skate in Thornhill, he competed at the JGP in Logroño, Spain and finished 4th – the highest result by a Malaysian in the Junior Grand Prix. He won his first ISU Challenger Series medal, silver, at the Denkova-Staviski Cup.

Yee finished 15th at the 2016 Four Continents Championships in Taipei after placing 15th in the short and 14th in the free. In March, he qualified for the free skate at the 2016 World Championships in Boston; he ranked 22nd in the short, 19th in the free, and 21st overall. During the season, he trained in Petaling Jaya and Barrie, Ontario, coached by Michael Hopfes and Doug Leigh.

Yee has also trained in the Elvis Stojko Arena (Toronto, Canada), the Chinese National Arena (Harbin, China), and the Beijing Capital Gymnasium (Beijing, China).

=== 2016–17 season ===
Yee won bronze at the Asian Open Trophy, held in Manila in August 2016. He then relocated to Barrie, Ontario to train full-time, taking a gap year off his university studies. He competed at two ISU Challenger Series events, placing 4th at the 2016 CS Nebelhorn Trophy in September and 5th at the 2016 CS Warsaw Cup in October.

Yee finished 15th overall at the 2017 Four Continents Championships in Pyeongchang, South Korea, and then went directly to Sapporo, Japan to compete at his first Asian Winter Games; he placed 8th with a new personal best of 222.69 points.

In March, he reached the final segment and finished 22nd overall at the 2017 World Championships in Helsinki, Finland.

=== 2017–18 season ===
In August 2017, Yee won gold at the 2017 Southeast Asian Games.

Yee represented Malaysia in the 2018 Pyeongchang Winter Olympics, together with Jeffrey Webb. He got a personal best score of 73.58 in the short program, and barely missed qualifying for the free skate. Yee is the first ever Malaysian figure skater to qualify for this event.

== Programs ==
Season	Short program	Free skating	Exhibition
2019–2020	Everglow by Coldplay	Seven Nation Army by The White Stripes; Highway to Hell by AC/DC; Kings & Queens by Thirty Seconds to Mars	
2018–2019	To Build a Home by Patrick Watson performed by The Cinematic Orchestra	Seven Nation Army by The White Stripes; Highway to Hell by AC/DC; Kings & Queens by Thirty Seconds to Mars	The Janitor: Can't Take My Eyes Off You by Frankie Valli; Fireball by Pitbull (rapper) ft. John Ryan
2017–2018	To Build a Home by Patrick Watson performed by The Cinematic Orchestra	It's a Man's World; Get Up (I Feel Like Being a) Sex Machine; I Feel Good by James Brown	The Janitor: Can't Take My Eyes Off You by Frankie Valli; Fireball by Pitbull (rapper) ft. John Ryan
2016–2017	I Put a Spell on You by Garou	It's a Man's World; Get Up (I Feel Like Being a) Sex Machine; I Feel Good by James Brown	The Janitor: Can't Take My Eyes Off You by Frankie Valli; Fireball by Pitbull (rapper) ft. John Ryan
2015–2016	I Put a Spell on You by Garou	Peter Gunn by Henry Mancini; Fever by John Davenport; Oye Negra by Eddie Cooley, Terry Snyder	
2014–2015	Chambermaid Swing by Parov Stelar; Capone by Ronan Hardiman	Peter Gunn by Henry Mancini; Fever by John Davenport; Oye Negra by Eddie Cooley, Terry Snyder	
2013–2014	Chambermaid Swing by Parov Stelar; Capone by Ronan Hardiman	Sons of Odin by Patrick Doyle; Unstoppable by Gregson and Mullen; Theme from Mission: Impossible by Hans Zimmer	
2012–2013	The Jet Song (from "West Side Story") by Leonard Bernstein	Sons of Odin by Patrick Doyle; Unstoppable by Gregson and Mullen; Theme from Mission: Impossible by Hans Zimmer	
2011–2012	The Jet Song (from "West Side Story") by Leonard Bernstein	Fever; Feeling Good by Michael Bublé; Sing, Sing, Sing by Benny Goodman; The Cotton Club by John Barry	

== Competitive highlights ==
GP: Grand Prix; CS: ISU Challenger Series; JGP: ISU Junior Grand Prix

International
Event	10–11	11–12	12–13	13–14	14–15	15–16	16–17	17–18	18–19	19–20
Olympics								25th		
Worlds						21st	22nd	21st	23rd	C
Four Continents				23rd	22nd	15th	15th	16th	20th	
GP Rostelecom									12th	
GP Skate America									7th	
GP Skate Canada										9th
CS Autumn Classic									7th	
CS Denkova-Staviski						2nd				
CS Nebelhorn						9th	4th	6th		6th
CS Tallinn Trophy								5th		
CS Warsaw Cup							5th			
Asian Games							8th			
Asian Open							3rd			
SEA Games								1st		1st
Skate Down Under				3rd						
International: Junior
Junior Worlds		36th	34th	35th	19th					
JGP Croatia					14th					
JGP Czech Republic				17th						
JGP Estonia		14th								
JGP Italy		22nd								
JGP Japan					6th					
JGP Latvia						7th				
JGP Poland				26th						
JGP Slovenia			21st							
JGP Spain						4th				
Asian Open		8th	6th	4th	2nd					
New Year's Cup			6th							
Skate Helena			1st							
Taipei Open				3rd						
National
Malaysian Champ.	1st J	2nd	1st	1st	1st	1st	1st		1st	
TBD = Assigned; WD = Withdrew; C = Event cancelled; J = Junior level; P = Preliminary round

== Detailed results ==
Further to the introduction of the +5 / -5 GOE for the season 2018/19, all statistics will restart from zero. All previous statistics are now considered historical.

=== Senior level ===
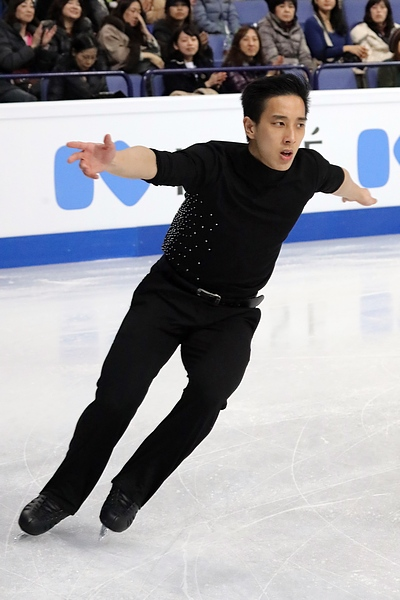
Yee at the 2017 World Championships.

2019–20 season
Date	Event	SP	FS	Total
29 November - 1 December 2019	2019 Southeast Asian Games	1; 63.35	1; 139.27	1; 202.62
25–27 October 2019	2019 Skate Canada International	7; 75.64	10; 135.99	9; 211.63
25–28 September 2019	2019 CS Nebelhorn Trophy	4; 68.87	8; 124.68	6; 193.55
2018–19 season
Date	Event	SP	FS	Total
18–24 March 2019	2019 World Championships	24; 73.63	23; 132.34	23; 205.97
7–10 February 2019	2019 Four Continents Championships	18; 61.23	17; 112.87	20; 174.10
16–18 November 2018	2018 Rostelecom Cup	12; 60.37	12; 118.34	12; 178.71
19–21 October 2018	2018 Skate America	3; 81.52	9; 125.99	7; 207.51
20–22 September 2018	2018 CS Autumn Classic International	5; 74.86	8; 126.43	7; 201.29
2017–18 season
Date	Event	SP	FS	Total
19–25 March 2018	2018 World Championships	21; 72.43	20; 136.60	21; 209.03
14–23 February 2018	2018 Winter Olympics	25; 73.58	DNQ	25
22–27 January 2018	2018 Four Continents Championships	17; 68.45	16; 129.23	16; 197.68
20–26 November 2017	2017 CS Tallinn Trophy	9; 63.70	4; 138.92	5; 202.62
27–30 September 2017	2017 CS Nebelhorn Trophy	6; 71.93	3; 148.74	6; 220.67
26–27 August 2017	2017 Southeast Asian Games	1; 73.03	1; 132.40	1; 205.43
2016–17 season
Date	Event	SP	FS	Total
27 March – 2 April 2017	2017 World Championships	23; 69.74	19; 144.25	22; 213.99
23–26 February 2017	2017 Asian Winter Games	10; 72.75	8; 149.94	8; 222.69
15–19 February 2017	2017 Four Continents Championships	15; 72.21	16; 130.46	15; 202.67
17–20 November 2016	2016 CS Warsaw Cup	2; 71.27	7; 126.48	5; 197.75
22–24 September 2016	2016 CS Nebelhorn Trophy	4; 72.59	5; 139.68	4; 212.27
4–7 August 2016	2016 Asian Open Trophy	3; 63.41	3; 125.60	3; 189.01
2015–16 season
Date	Event	SP	FS	Total
26 March – 3 April 2016	2016 World Championships	22; 67.60	19; 135.34	21; 202.94
16–21 February 2016	2016 Four Continents Championships	15; 59.70	14; 130.62	15; 190.32
20–25 October 2015	2015 CS Denkova-Staviski Cup	1; 67.24	3; 130.18	2; 197.42
24–26 September 2015	2015 CS Nebelhorn Trophy	9; 65.89	7; 125.38	9; 191.27

=== Junior level ===
2015–16 season
Date	Event	Level	SP	FS	Total
30 September – 3 October 2015	2015 JGP Spain	Junior	5; 59.34	4; 120.51	4; 179.85
26–29 August 2015	2015 JGP Latvia	Junior	7; 59.10	6; 117.69	7; 176.79
2014–15 season
Date	Event	Level	SP	FS	Total
March	2015 World Junior Championships	Junior			19
9–15 February 2015	2015 Four Continents Championships	Senior			22
	2014 JGP Croatia	Junior			14
	2014 JGP Japan	Junior			6
August	2014 Asian Open Trophy	Junior			2
2013–14 season
Date	Event	Level	SP	FS	Total
2012–13 season
Date	Event	Level	SP	FS	Total
2011–12 season
Date	Event	Level	SP	FS	Total
March 2012	2012 Malaysian Championships	Senior			2
12–15 October 2011	2011 JGP Estonia	Junior	13; 36.58	13; 76.32	14; 112.90
5–8 October 2011	2011 JGP Italy	Junior	23; 30.91	22; 62.04	22; 92.95
22–26 August 2011	2011 Asian Open Trophy	Junior	9; 33.73	8; 71.42	8; 105.15
2010–11 season
Date	Event	Level	SP	FS	Total
25 March – 2011	2011 Malaysian Junior Championships	Junior	1; 36.89	1; 71.96	1; 108.85

Olympic Games
Preceded by Inaugural	Flagbearer for Malaysia; PyeongChang 2018	Succeeded by Jeffrey Webb; Aruwin Salehhuddin
