= Jeffrey Webb (skier) =

Malaysian alpine skier

Personal information
- Born: 27 October 1998 (age 27) Selangor, Malaysia

Skiing career
- Sport: Alpine skiing
- Disciplines: Slalom, giant slalom

Olympics
- Teams: 2 – (2018, 2022)

Jeffrey Webb (born October 27, 1998) is a Malaysian alpine ski racer. He represented Malaysia at the 2018 and 2022 Winter Olympics. As the first Malaysian to qualify, he was one of the first to compete for Malaysia at the Winter Olympics. He also competed in the 2017 Asian Winter Games.

== Career ==
He competed for Malaysia at the 2017 Asian Winter Games in Sapporo, Japan. This was the first time Malaysia had participated in alpine skiing in the Asian Winter Games. He has also competed in various championships and races throughout North America.

He represented Malaysia at the 2018 Winter Olympics in Pyeongchang, South Korea. He was one of the first Malaysians to participate in the Winter Olympics, the other being Julian Yee.

In 2019 he qualified for the World Junior Alpine Skiing Championships in Val di Fassa, Trentino, Italy, but ultimately did not start.

He competed in the 2022 Winter Olympics in Beijing, China under the Malaysian flag alongside Aruwin Salehhuddin, who also competed in alpine skiing. They were also Malaysia's flagbearers during the opening ceremony. He was the flag bearer during the closing ceremony.

== Asian Winter Games results ==
Year
Year	Age	Slalom	Giant; Slalom	Super G	Downhill	Combined
2017	18	10	15	—N/a		

== Olympic results ==
Year
Year	Age	Slalom	Giant; Slalom	Super G	Downhill	Combined
2018	19	DNF1	68	—	—	—
2022	23	DNF1	—	—	—	—

Olympic Games
Preceded by Julian Yee	Flagbearer for Malaysia; Beijing 2022	Succeeded by Incumbent
