= 2017 CS Nebelhorn Trophy =

- Type: ISU Challenger Series
- Date: September 27 – 30
- Season: 2017–18
- Location: Oberstdorf
- Venue: Eissportzentrum Oberstdorf

Champions
- Men's singles: (Belgium) Jorik Hendrickx
- Ladies' singles: (Australia) Kailani Craine
- Pairs: (Russia) Evgenia Tarasova / Vladimir Morozov
- Ice dance: (United Kingdom) Penny Coomes / Nicholas Buckland
- Previous: 2017 CS Autumn Classic; 2017 CS Ondrej Nepela Trophy
- Next: 2017 CS Finlandia Trophy

The 2017 CS Nebelhorn Trophy was a senior international figure skating competition held in September 2017 in Oberstdorf, Germany. It was part of the 2017–18 ISU Challenger Series. It also served as the final qualification event for the 2018 Winter Olympics. Medals were awarded in the disciplines of men's singles, ladies' singles, pair skating, and ice dance.

== Entries ==
The International Skating Union published the preliminary list of entries on 27 August 2017:

Country	Men	Ladies	Pairs	Ice dance
Armenia	Slavik Hayrapetyan	Anastasia Galustyan		Tina Garabedian / Simon Proulx-Sénécal
Australia		Kailani Craine	Ekaterina Alexandrovskaya / Harley Windsor	Kimberley Hew-Low / Timothy Mckernan
Austria	Luc Maierhofer	Kerstin Frank	Miriam Ziegler / Severin Kiefer	
Azerbaijan	Larry Loupolover	Kim Cheremsky		Anastasia Galyeta / Avidan Brown
Belarus	Yakau Zenko		Tatiana Danilova / Mikalai Kamianchuk	Viktoria Kavaliova / Yurii Bieliaiev
Belgium	Jorik Hendrickx			
Brazil		Isadora Williams		
Bulgaria	Nicky Obreykov	Presiyana Dimitrova		
Canada			Camille Ruest / Andrew Wolfe	Haley Sales / Nikolas Wamsteeker
Chinese Taipei	Chih-i Tsao	Amy Lin		
Croatia	Nicholas Vrdoljak			
Czech Republic		Elizaveta Ukolova	Anna Dušková / Martin Bidař	Cortney Mansour / Michal Češka
Denmark		Pernille Sørensen		
Estonia	Aleksandr Selevko	Kristina Shkuleta-Gromova		Viktoria Semenjuk / Artur Gruzdev
Finland	Valtter Virtanen	Viveca Lindfors		Cecilia Törn / Jussiville Partanen
Germany		Nathalie Weinzierl	Annika Hocke / Ruben Blommaert; Aliona Savchenko / Bruno Massot	Kavita Lorenz / Joti Polizoakis
Greece		Dimitra Korri		
Hong Kong	Harrison Jon-Yen Wong	Joanna So		
Hungary			Darja Beklemiscseva / Mark Magyar	Anna Yanovskaya / Ádám Lukács
Ireland	Conor Stakelum			
Israel		Aimee Buchanan	Paige Conners / Evgeni Krasnopolski	
Italy	Matteo Rizzo			
Japan			Sumire Suto / Francis Boudreau-Audet	Kana Muramoto / Chris Reed
Latvia				Olga Jakushina / Andrey Nevskiy
Liechtenstein		Romana Kaiser		
Lithuania		Aleksandra Golovkina		Allison Reed / Saulius Ambrulevičius
Luxembourg		Fleur Maxwell		
Malaysia	Julian Yee	Aina Sorfina Mohd Aminudin		
Mexico	Donovan Carrillo	Sofia Del Rio		
Netherlands	Thomas Kennes	Niki Wories		
North Korea			Ryom Tae-ok / Kim Ju-sik	
Norway	Sondre Oddvoll Bøe	Anne Line Gjersem		
Philippines	Michael Christian Martinez	Alisson Perticheto		
Poland	Ihor Reznichenko	Elżbieta Gabryszak		
Romania		Julia Sauter		
Russia			Evgenia Tarasova / Vladimir Morozov	
Serbia		Antonina Dubinina		
Singapore		Yu Shuran		
Slovakia	Marco Klepoch			Lucie Myslivečková / Lukáš Csölley
Slovenia		Daša Grm		
South Africa		Kathryn Winstanley		
South Korea	Lee June-hyoung		Kim Su-yeon / Kim Hyung-tae	Yura Min / Alexander Gamelin
Spain			Laura Barquero / Aritz Maestu	
Sweden	Alexander Majorov	Matilda Algotsson		Malin Malmberg / Thomas Nordahl
Switzerland	Stéphane Walker	Alexia Paganini		
Thailand		Thita Lamsam		
Turkey	Engin Ali Artan	Birce Atabey		
Ukraine	Yaroslav Paniot	Anna Khnychenkova		
United Arab Emirates		Zahra Lari		
United Kingdom	Graham Newberry	Natasha McKay	Zoe Jones / Christopher Boyadji	Penny Coomes / Nicholas Buckland
United States	Alexander Johnson		Ashley Cain-Gribble / Timothy LeDuc	Karina Manta / Joseph Johnson

== Result ==
=== Men ===
Rank	Name	Nation	Total points	SP		FS		Olympic Qualification
1	Jorik Hendrickx	Belgium	253.06	1	85.15	1	167.91	Qualified
2	Alexander Johnson	United States	226.04	2	82.55	6	143.49	Already qualified
3	Alexander Majorov	Sweden	225.04	3	77.01	5	148.03	Qualified
4	Matteo Rizzo	Italy	223.27	5	72.97	2	150.30	Qualified
5	Lee June-hyoung	South Korea	222.89	4	74.37	4	148.52	Qualified
6	Julian Zhi Jie Yee	Malaysia	220.67	6	71.93	3	148.74	Qualified
7	Yaroslav Paniot	Ukraine	208.76	7	67.68	7	141.08	Qualified
8	Michael Christian Martinez	Philippines	191.74	8	67.50	9	124.24	
9	Stéphane Walker	Switzerland	190.54	9	66.80	11	123.74	
10	Graham Newberry	United Kingdom	188.71	10	64.83	10	123.88	
11	Ihor Reznichenko	Poland	186.20	15	58.14	8	128.06	
12	Slavik Hayrapetyan	Armenia	179.98	13	60.25	14	119.73	
13	Thomas Kennes	Netherlands	178.20	11	60.82	15	117.38	
14	Donovan Carrillo	Mexico	177.66	19	55.83	12	121.83	
15	Chih-I Tsao	Chinese Taipei	177.61	16	56.97	13	120.64	
16	Nicholas Vrdoljak	Croatia	172.26	18	55.85	16	116.41	
17	Valtter Virtanen	Finland	171.85	14	59.62	17	112.23	
18	Aleksandr Selevko	Estonia	167.06	12	60.63	20	106.43	
19	Harrison Jon-Yen Wong	Hong Kong	164.84	23	54.48	18	110.36	
20	Sondre Oddvoll Bøe	Norway	163.21	20	55.37	19	107.84	
21	Larry Loupolover	Azerbaijan	155.62	21	54.63	21	100.99	
22	Burak Demirboğa	Turkey	153.61	22	54.54	22	99.07	
23	Yakau Zenko	Belarus	151.65	24	53.05	23	98.60	
24	Nicky Obreykov	Bulgaria	144.85	17	56.82	25	88.03	
25	Conor Stakelum	Ireland	139.97	25	47.10	24	92.87	
26	Luc Maierhofer	Austria	130.45	26	46.52	26	83.93	

=== Ladies ===
Rank	Name	Nation	Total points	SP		FS		Olympic Qualification
1	Kailani Craine	Australia	167.45	1	58.02	2	109.43	Qualified
2	Matilda Algotsson	Sweden	167.01	2	56.91	1	110.10	Qualified
3	Alexia Paganini	Switzerland	155.98	6	53.59	3	102.39	Qualified
4	Nathalie Weinzierl	Germany	155.85	3	55.48	5	100.37	Already qualified
5	Isadora Williams	Brazil	154.21	7	53.44	4	100.77	Qualified
6	Viveca Lindfors	Finland	154.10	5	53.75	6	100.35	Qualified
7	Anna Khnychenkova	Ukraine	151.08	4	55.05	8	96.03	Qualified
8	Anastasia Galustyan	Armenia	142.30	15	45.57	7	96.73	
9	Yu Shuran	Singapore	142.23	9	49.94	9	92.29	
10	Amy Lin	Chinese Taipei	140.52	10	49.50	10	91.02	
11	Alisson Krystle Perticheto	Philippines	136.66	12	46.75	11	89.91	
12	Kristina Škuleta-Gromova	Estonia	135.33	11	48.56	13	86.77	
13	Kerstin Frank	Austria	129.99	13	46.73	16	83.26	
14	Daša Grm	Slovenia	129.09	22	40.01	12	89.08	
15	Joanne So	Hong Kong	127.91	14	46.02	17	81.89	
16	Anne Line Gjersem	Norway	125.82	8	50.75	20	75.07	
17	Elizaveta Ukolova	Czech Republic	125.20	21	40.14	14	85.06	
18	Natasha McKay	United Kingdom	124.35	20	40.50	15	83.85	
19	Aleksandra Golovkina	Lithuania	121.91	18	40.98	18	80.93	
20	Kim Cheremsky	Azerbaijan	115.07	16	42.84	22	72.23	
21	Sıla Saygı	Turkey	113.76	24	38.10	19	75.66	
22	Pernille Sørensen	Denmark	112.41	17	41.51	23	70.90	
23	Antonina Dubinina	Serbia	106.54	23	38.50	24	68.04	
24	Elżbieta Gabryszak	Poland	106.02	19	40.69	28	65.33	
25	Romana Kaiser	Liechtenstein	105.88	28	32.63	21	73.25	
26	Niki Wories	Netherlands	103.36	25	37.74	27	65.62	
27	Presiyana Dimitrova	Bulgaria	101.84	26	34.43	25	67.41	
28	Thita Lamsam	Thailand	97.27	31	30.46	26	66.81	
29	Sofia Del Rio	Mexico	95.23	27	34.16	29	61.07	
30	Kathryn Winstanley	South Africa	89.04	29	32.60	30	56.44	
31	Dimitra Korri	Greece	74.15	33	22.88	31	51.27	
32	Aina Sorfina Mohd Aminudin	Malaysia	72.29	32	24.21	32	48.08	
33	Zahra Lari	United Arab Emirates	63.85	34	21.63	33	42.22	
WD	Aimee Buchanan	Israel		30	32.42			
WD	Julia Sauter	Romania						

=== Pairs ===
Rank	Name	Nation	Total points	SP		FS		Olympic Qualification
1	Evgenia Tarasova / Vladimir Morozov	Russia	218.46	1	77.52	1	140.94	Already qualified
2	Aliona Savchenko / Bruno Massot	Germany	211.08	2	72.99	2	138.09	Already qualified
3	Ekaterina Alexandrovskaya / Harley Windsor	Australia	190.31	4	64.51	3	125.80	Qualified
4	Miriam Ziegler / Severin Kiefer	Austria	180.60	3	65.09	8	115.51	Qualified
5	Annika Hocke / Ruben Blommaert	Germany	180.37	8	56.76	4	123.61	Already qualified
6	Ryom Tae-ok / Kim Ju-sik	North Korea	180.09	5	60.19	6	119.90	Qualified
7	Ashley Cain-Gribble / Timothy LeDuc	United States	176.35	10	55.47	5	120.88	Already qualified
8	Paige Conners / Evgeni Krasnopolski	Israel	171.61	9	55.85	7	115.76	Qualified
9	Anna Dušková / Martin Bidař	Czech Republic	169.66	7	58.80	9	110.86	Qualified
10	Camille Ruest / Andrew Wolfe	Canada	169.11	6	59.40	10	109.71	Already qualified
11	Sumire Suto / Francis Boudreau-Audet	Japan	148.42	11	54.36	14	94.06	
12	Tatiana Danilova / Mikalai Kamianchuk	Belarus	147.50	12	49.96	11	97.54	
13	Laura Barquero / Aritz Maestu	Spain	145.10	13	49.78	13	95.32	
14	Zoe Jones / Christopher Boyadji	United Kingdom	142.54	14	45.18	12	97.36	
15	Kim Su-yeon / Kim Hyung-tae	South Korea	129.00	16	40.75	15	88.25	
16	Darja Beklemiscseva / Márk Magyar	Hungary	114.14	15	42.27	16	71.87	

=== Ice dance ===
Rank	Name	Nation	Total points	SD		FD		Olympic Qualification
1	Penny Coomes / Nicholas Buckland	United Kingdom	177.13	1	71.79	1	105.34	Qualified
2	Kana Muramoto / Chris Reed	Japan	159.30	2	62.67	2	96.63	Qualified
3	Kavita Lorenz / Joti Polizoakis	Germany	152.50	3	61.09	3	91.41	Qualified
4	Yura Min / Alexander Gamelin	South Korea	143.80	7	55.94	5	87.86	Qualified
5	Cortney Mansour / Michal Češka	Czech Republic	143.44	9	54.94	4	88.50	Qualified
6	Lucie Myslivečková / Lukáš Csölley	Slovakia	143.22	6	55.97	6	87.25	Qualified
7	Allison Reed / Saulius Ambrulevičius	Lithuania	142.95	4	58.34	8	84.61	
8	Tina Garabedian / Simon Proulx-Sénécal	Armenia	140.98	8	55.05	7	85.93	
9	Cecilia Törn / Jussiville Partanen	Finland	138.45	5	56.32	9	82.13	
10	Haley Sales / Nikolas Wamsteeker	Canada	134.84	10	53.59	10	81.25	Already qualified
11	Viktoria Kavaliova / Yurii Bieliaiev	Belarus	132.61	11	53.27	12	79.34	
12	Anna Yanovskaya / Ádám Lukács	Hungary	130.27	14	49.49	11	80.78	
13	Olga Jakušina / Andrey Nevskiy	Latvia	127.76	13	50.76	13	77.00	
14	Karina Manta / Joseph Johnson	United States	126.48	12	51.91	14	74.57	Already qualified
15	Anastasia Galyeta / Avidan Brown	Azerbaijan	118.20	15	46.57	15	71.63	
16	Viktoria Semenjuk / Artur Gruzdev	Estonia	110.98	16	45.49	16	65.49	
17	Kimberley Hew-Low / Timothy Mckernan	Australia	94.54	17	38.46	17	56.08	
18	Malin Malmberg / Thomas Nordahl	Sweden	82.58	18	34.24	18	48.34	
