= Aruwin Salehhuddin =

Malaysian alpine skier (born 2004)

Personal information
- Born: 14 February 2004 (age 22) Bellingham, Washington, United States

Skiing career
- Country: Malaysia
- Sport: Alpine skiing
- Club: Ski Malaysia
- Disciplines: Slalom, giant slalom

Olympics
- Teams: 2 – (2022, 2026)
- Medals: 0

World Championships
- Teams: 1 – (2025)
- Medals: 0

Aruwin Idami binti Salehhuddin (born February 14, 2004) is a Malaysian alpine ski racer.

== Career ==
She competed at the 2022 Winter Olympics in Beijing, China under the Malaysian flag alongside Jeffrey Webb, who also competed in alpine skiing. Both of them were also the flagbearers for Malaysia. She is also the first female athlete to represent Malaysia at the Winter Olympics. In the giant slalom she finished 38th. She made her second Olympic appearance at the 2026 Milano Cortina games, where she was the only competitor for the Malaysian team.

== Olympic results ==
Year
Year	Age	Slalom	Giant; Slalom	Super G	Downhill	Combined	Team combined
2022	17	DNF1	38	—	—	—	—N/a
2026	21	44	DNF1	—	—	—N/a	—

== World Championships results ==
Year
Year	Age	Slalom	Giant slalom	Super-G	Downhill	Team combined	Team event
2025	20	DNF1	42	—	—	—	—
