= 2017 CS U.S. International Figure Skating Classic =

2017 CS U.S. International Classic
- Type: ISU Challenger Series
- Date: September 13 – 17
- Season: 2017–18
- Location: Salt Lake City, Utah, United States
- Venue: Salt Lake City Sports Complex

Champions
- Men's singles: (United States) Nathan Chen
- Ladies' singles: (Japan) Marin Honda
- Pairs: (Canada) Kirsten Moore-Towers / Michael Marinaro
- Ice dance: (United States) Madison Hubbell / Zachary Donohue
- Previous: 2017 CS Lombardia Trophy
- Next: 2017 CS Autumn Classic; 2017 CS Ondrej Nepela Trophy

The 2017 CS U.S. International Figure Skating Classic were held in September 2017 in Salt Lake City, Utah. It was part of the 2017–18 ISU Challenger Series. Medals were awarded in the disciplines of men's singles, ladies' singles, pair skating, and ice dance.

== Entries ==
The International Skating Union published the list of entries on 21 August 2017.

Country	Men	Ladies	Pairs	Ice dance
Armenia				Tina Garabedian / Simon Proulx-Sénécal
Australia	Andrew Dodds; Jordan Dodds	Brooklee Han	Paris Stephens / Matthew Dodds	
Canada	Liam Firus; Bennet Toman	Michelle Long; Alicia Pineault	Sydney Kolodziej / Maxime Deschamps; Kirsten Moore-Towers / Michael Marinaro	Carolane Soucisse / Shane Firus
Chinese Taipei	Chih-Sheng Chang			
Czech Republic	Michal Březina			
Denmark				Laurence Fournier Beaudry / Nikolaj Sørensen
Israel	Daniel Samohin	Aimee Buchanan	Paige Conners / Evgeni Krasnopolski	Adel Tankova / Ronald Zilberberg
Japan	Takahito Mura; Kazuki Tomono	Marin Honda; Kaori Sakamoto	Sumire Suto / Francis Boudreau-Audet	Kana Muramoto / Chris Reed
Spain				Olivia Smart / Adrià Díaz
Ukraine	Yaroslav Paniot			
United States	Max Aaron; Nathan Chen; Timothy Dolensky; Sean Rabbitt	Mariah Bell; Karen Chen; Mirai Nagasu; Paige Rydberg	Haven Denney / Brandon Frazier; Chelsea Liu / Brian Johnson; Alexa Scimeca Knierim / Chris Knierim; Deanna Stellato / Nathan Bartholomay	Julia Biechler / Damian Dodge; Kaitlin Hawayek / Jean-Luc Baker; Madison Hubbell / Zachary Donohue

Withdrew before starting orders drawn

- Ladies: (Chinese Taipei) Haley Yao, (Chinese Taipei) Stephanie Yuung-Shuh Chang
- Ice dance: (United Kingdom) Robynne Tweedale / Joseph Buckland, (Azerbaijan) Anastasia Galyeta / Avidan Brown

== Senior results ==
=== Men ===
Rank	Name	Nation	Total	SP		FS	
1	Nathan Chen	United States	275.04	1	91.80	1	183.24
2	Max Aaron	United States	261.56	2	86.06	2	175.50
3	Liam Firus	Canada	248.29	3	83.46	3	164.83
4	Yaroslav Paniot	Ukraine	233.16	6	77.20	4	155.96
5	Kazuki Tomono	Japan	225.30	8	69.88	5	155.42
6	Timothy Dolensky	United States	214.94	4	78.75	6	136.19
7	Takahito Mura	Japan	205.38	5	77.44	8	127.94
8	Sean Rabbitt	United States	204.46	9	68.60	7	135.86
9	Michal Březina	Czech Republic	193.95	7	75.78	11	118.17
10	Daniel Samohin	Israel	191.20	11	64.74	9	126.46
11	Bennet Toman	Canada	188.31	10	66.96	10	121.35
12	Jordan Dodds	Australia	152.70	13	51.19	12	101.51
13	Andrew Dodds	Australia	143.24	12	58.44	13	84.80
14	Chih-Sheng Chang	Chinese Taipei	114.68	14	36.40	14	78.28

=== Ladies ===
Rank	Name	Nation	Total	SP		FS	
1	Marin Honda	Japan	198.42	1	66.90	1	131.52
2	Mirai Nagasu	United States	183.54	3	63.81	2	119.73
3	Karen Chen	United States	182.32	2	66.18	3	116.14
4	Kaori Sakamoto	Japan	169.12	5	56.82	4	112.30
5	Mariah Bell	United States	168.66	4	60.68	5	107.98
6	Alicia Pineault	Canada	150.52	6	56.22	6	94.30
7	Brooklee Han	Australia	131.02	8	45.93	7	85.09
8	Michelle Long	Canada	119.98	9	44.67	8	75.31
9	Paige Rydberg	United States	119.71	7	46.54	10	73.17
10	Aimee Buchanan	Israel	107.78	10	33.71	9	74.07

=== Pairs ===
Rank	Name	Nation	Total	SP		FS	
1	Kirsten Moore-Towers / Michael Marinaro	Canada	188.76	1	65.76	2	123.00
2	Alexa Scimeca Knierim / Chris Knierim	United States	186.08	3	61.32	1	124.76
3	Chelsea Liu / Brian Johnson	United States	181.40	2	61.46	3	119.94
4	Haven Denney / Brandon Frazier	United States	168.47	7	55.26	4	113.21
5	Paige Conners / Evgeni Krasnopolski	Israel	165.38	5	57.92	6	107.46
6	Deanna Stellato / Nathan Bartholomay	United States	165.36	4	58.24	7	107.12
7	Sydney Kolodziej / Maxime Deschamps	Canada	164.32	6	55.54	5	108.78
8	Sumire Suto / Francis Boudreau-Audet	Japan	153.60	8	50.60	8	103.00
9	Paris Stephens / Matthew Dodds	Australia	84.84	9	27.32	9	57.52

=== Ice dance ===
Rank	Name	Nation	Total	SP		FS	
1	Madison Hubbell / Zachary Donohue	United States	178.80	1	71.15	1	107.65
2	Kaitlin Hawayek / Jean-Luc Baker	United States	153.55	3	56.65	2	96.90
3	Kana Muramoto / Chris Reed	Japan	151.45	2	60.00	3	91.45
4	Laurence Fournier Beaudry / Nikolaj Sorensen	Denmark	141.71	4	54.23	4	87.48
5	Carolane Soucisse / Shane Firus	Canada	137.43	5	52.16	5	85.27
6	Tina Garabedian / Simon Proulx-Senecal	Armenia	133.26	6	51.60	7	81.66
7	Olivia Smart / Adria Diaz	Spain	132.13	8	48.15	6	83.98
8	Julia Biechler / Damian Dodge	United States	127.12	7	50.36	8	76.76
9	Adel Tankova / Ronald Zilberberg	Israel	102.59	9	40.26	9	62.33
