= Figure skating at the 2018 Winter Olympics – Ice dance =

Ice dance at the XXIII Olympic Winter Games
- Venue: Gangneung Ice Arena; Gangneung, South Korea
- Dates: 19–20 February 2018
- Competitors: 24 teams from 17 nations
- Winning score: 206.07 points

Medalists
1st place, gold medalist(s)		Tessa Virtue and Scott Moir	Canada
2nd place, silver medalist(s)		Gabriella Papadakis and Guillaume Cizeron	France
3rd place, bronze medalist(s)		Maia Shibutani and Alex Shibutani	United States

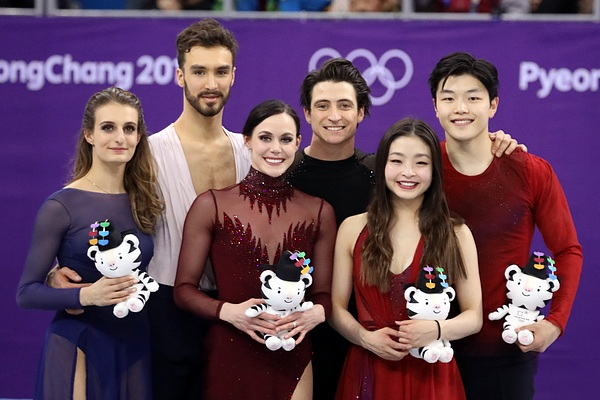
The medalists from the ice dance event at the 2018 Winter Olympics (from left to right): Gabriella Papadakis and Guillaume Cizeron of France (silver); Tessa Virtue and Scott Moir of Canada (gold); and Maia and Alex Shibutani of the United States (bronze)

The ice dance competition at the 2018 Winter Olympics was held on 19 and 20 February at the Gangneung Ice Arena in Gangneung, South Korea, and featured 24 teams from 17 different nations. Tessa Virtue and Scott Moir of Canada won the gold medals, Gabriella Papadakis and Guillaume Cizeron of France won the silver, and siblings Maia Shibutani and Alex Shibutani of the United States won the bronze. In addition to their gold medal victory, Virtue and Moir set new world record scores in the short dance, free dance, and overall total score. This was their fifth Olympic medal win – having previously won medals in both the ice dance and team events in 2010 and 2014, as well as the team event in 2018 – making Virtue and Moir the most decorated figure skaters in Olympic history.

== Background ==
In 2016, an independent report commissioned by the World Anti-Doping Agency confirmed allegations that the Russian Olympic team had been involved in a state-sponsored doping program from at least late 2011 through February 2014, when Russia hosted the Winter Olympics in Sochi. On 5 December 2017, the International Olympic Committee announced that the Russian Olympic Committee had been suspended from the 2018 Winter Olympics. Athletes with no previous drug violations and a consistent history of drug testing were allowed to compete under the Olympic flag as an "Olympic Athlete from Russia" (OAR). Under the terms of the decree, neither the Russian flag nor anthem were to be used at the Olympics; the Olympic flag and Olympic Anthem were used instead.

The ice dance event was one of five figure skating competitions contested at the 2018 Winter Olympics in Gangneung, South Korea. It was held at the Gangneung Ice Arena over two days: the short dance took place on 19 February and the free dance on 20 February. The competition featured 24 teams representing 17 nations. Tessa Virtue and Scott Moir of Canada were the presumptive favorites, having previously won gold medals in ice dance at the 2010 Winter Olympics, silver medals in both the ice dance event and the team event at the 2014 Winter Olympics, and gold again in the team event just one week earlier. Virtue and Moir were three-time world champions, three-time Four Continents champions, and eight-time Canadian national champions. They had retired after the 2014 Olympics, disappointed with their silver-medal finish, but returned after two years to make another go the Olympics. Their greatest rivals were Gabriella Papadakis and Guillaume Cizeron of France. Alice Park of Time magazine described the two couples as "indisputably the top dance teams competing at [the] Olympics". Virtue and Moir had beaten Papadakis and Cizeron at the 2017 World Championships, while Papadakis and Cizeron had beaten Virtue and Moir at the 2017 Grand Prix of Figure Skating Final. Papadakis and Cizeron were two-time world champions, four-time European champions, and four-time French national champions. Both teams trained with Marie-France Dubreuil and Patrice Lauzon at the same academy in Montreal, along with Madison Hubbell and Zachary Donohue of the United States, as well as the national champions of Armenia, Bulgaria, Denmark, and Spain, and a number of other teams.

== Qualification ==
Nineteen quota spots in the ice dance event were awarded based on results at the 2017 World Championships. Denmark had originally qualified one quota spot at the 2017 World Championships; however, they relinquished their spot when Laurence Fournier Beaudry was unable to obtain Danish citizenship. The extra quota spot was made available at the 2017 Nebelhorn Trophy along with the other five slots originally allocated.

Qualifying nations in ice dance
Event	Teams per NOC	Qualifying NOCs	Total teams
2017 World Championships	3	Canada; United States	18
2017 World Championships	2	France (International Olympic Committee) OAR; Italy	18
2017 World Championships	1	Israel; ~~Denmark~~; Poland; Ukraine; China; Turkey; Spain	18
2017 Nebelhorn Trophy	1	Great Britain; Japan; Germany; South Korea; Czech Republic; Slovakia	6
Total			24

== Required performance elements ==
Couples competing in ice dance first performed their short dances on 19 February. Teams had to choose from one of the following rhythms: the cha-cha, rhumba, samba, mambo, meringue, salsa, bachata, or any closely-related Latin American rhythm. The required pattern dance element was the rhumba. Lasting 2 minutes 50 seconds (+/− 10 seconds), the short dance had to include the following elements: the pattern dance element, one dance lift, one pattern dance step sequence while in hold, one step sequence while not touching, and one set of sequential twizzles.

The twenty highest-scoring teams after the short dance performed their free dances on 20 February. Lasting 4 minutes (+/− 10 seconds), the free dance had to include the following: one short lift and one combination lift, or three short lifts; one dance spin; one set of synchronized twizzles; one straight-line step sequence while in hold; one curved step sequence while in hold; and two choreographic elements.

== Judging ==
Skaters were judged according to the required technical elements of their program (such as choreographic elements), as well as the overall presentation of their program, based on five program components (skating skills, transitions, performance, composition, and musical interpretation/timing). Each technical element in a figure skating performance was assigned a predetermined base point value and scored by a panel of nine judges on a scale from −3 to +3 based on the quality of its execution. Each Grade of Execution (GOE) from –3 to +3 was assigned a value as indicated on the Scale of Values. For example, a curve lift (level 4) was worth a base value of 4.50 points, and a GOE of +3 was worth 1.80 points, so a curve lift (level 4) with a GOE of +3 earned 6.30 points. The judging panel's GOE for each element was determined by calculating the trimmed mean (the average after discarding the highest and lowest scores). The panel's scores for all elements were added together to generate a Total Elements Score. At the same time, the judges evaluated each performance based on the five aforementioned program components and assigned each a score from 0.25 to 10 in 0.25-point increments. The judging panel's final score for each program component was also determined by calculating the trimmed mean. Those scores were then multiplied by the factor shown on the chart below; the results were added together to generate a total Program Component Score.

Program component factoring
Discipline	Short dance	Free dance
Ice dance	0.80	1.20

Deductions were applied for certain violations, such as time infractions, stops and restarts, or falls. The Total Elements Score and Program Component Score were then added together, minus any deductions, to generate a final performance score for each skater or team.

== Results ==
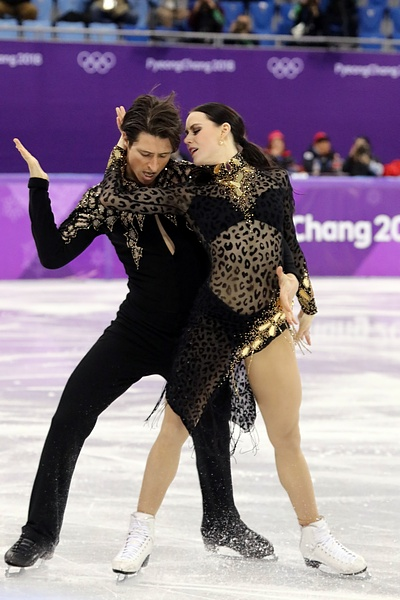
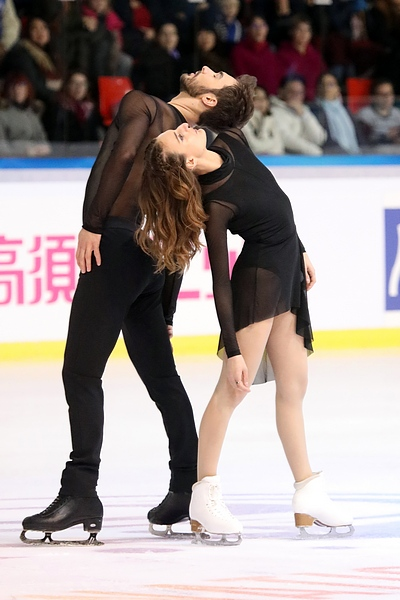
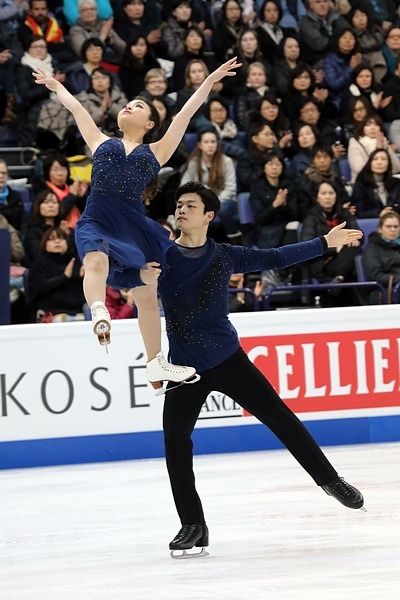
The gold, silver, and bronze medalists from the ice dance event at the 2018 Winter Olympics (from left to right):
Tessa Virtue and Scott Moir of Canada (gold); Gabriella Papadakis and Guillaume Cizeron of France (silver); and Maia Shibutani and Alex Shibutani of the United States (bronze)

Code key

- TSS – Total Segment Score
- TES – Total Elements Score
- PCS – Program Component Score
- SS – Skating skills
- TR – Transitions
- PE – Performance
- CO – Composition
- IN – Musical interpretation/Timing
- DED – Deductions

=== Short dance ===
The short dance was held on 19 February. Tessa Virtue and Scott Moir of Canada finished in first place, setting a new world record score in the process. Their performance, set to music by The Rolling Stones, demonstrated sensuality and sexuality, and included dance elements from the samba, rhumba, and cha-cha-cha. Gabriella Papadakis of France suffered a costume malfunction early in her program when the clasp at the back of her neck came undone. Had she and Guillaume Cizeron stopped for emergency repair, they would have incurred a penalty, so they continued to perform. "It was ... my worst nightmare happening at the Olympics," Papadakis said afterward. Papadakis spent the entire routine trying to hold the top of her dress in place, which hindered some of her movements, especially during the twizzle sequence, and eventually the top of her dress slipped, exposing her breast to the audience. They still finished in second place, within two points of Virtue and Moir, a difference which Cizeron believed was not insurmountable. Madison Hubbell and Zachary Donohue, the reigning U.S. national champions, finished in third place, setting a new personal-best score, while siblings Maia and Alex Shibutani, also of the United States, finished in fourth place. A difference of 0.02 points separated the two American teams.

Short dance results
Pl.	Team	Nation	TSS	TES	PCS	SS	TR	PE	CO	IN	DED
1	Tessa Virtue; Scott Moir	Canada	83.67	44.53	39.14	9.68	9.61	9.93	9.79	9.93	0.00
2	Gabriella Papadakis; Guillaume Cizeron	France	81.93	42.71	39.22	9.71	9.71	9.82	9.89	9.89	0.00
3	Madison Hubbell; Zachary Donohue	United States	77.75	40.98	36.77	9.29	9.04	9.25	9.14	9.25	0.00
4	Maia Shibutani; Alex Shibutani	United States	77.73	40.33	37.40	9.36	9.18	9.46	9.36	9.39	0.00
5	Anna Cappellini; Luca Lanotte	Italy	76.57	40.00	36.57	8.93	8.96	9.32	9.14	9.36	0.00
6	Ekaterina Bobrova; Dmitri Soloviev	(International Olympic Committee) OAR	75.47	38.36	37.11	9.18	9.14	9.46	9.29	9.32	0.00
7	Madison Chock; Evan Bates	United States	75.45	39.39	36.06	8.93	8.86	9.04	9.11	9.14	0.00
8	Kaitlyn Weaver; Andrew Poje	Canada	74.33	37.65	36.68	9.18	8.96	9.29	9.14	9.29	0.00
9	Piper Gilles; Paul Poirier	Canada	69.60	34.95	34.65	8.64	8.46	8.71	8.79	8.71	0.00
10	Penny Coomes; Nicholas Buckland	Great Britain	68.36	34.70	33.66	8.36	8.14	8.50	8.54	8.54	0.00
11	Charlène Guignard; Marco Fabbri	Italy	68.16	34.19	33.97	8.46	8.43	8.50	8.46	8.61	0.00
12	Sara Hurtado; Kirill Khaliavin	Spain	66.93	35.07	31.86	8.00	7.57	8.18	7.86	8.21	0.00
13	Tiffany Zahorski; Jonathan Guerreiro	(International Olympic Committee) OAR	66.47	34.15	32.32	8.04	7.79	8.21	8.07	8.29	0.00
14	Natalia Kaliszek; Maksym Spodyriev	Poland	66.06	34.65	31.41	7.79	7.61	8.04	7.86	7.96	0.00
15	Kana Muramoto; Chris Reed	Japan	63.41	32.87	30.54	7.61	7.46	7.71	7.68	7.71	0.00
16	Yura Min; Alexander Gamelin	South Korea	61.22	32.94	28.28	6.96	6.82	7.21	7.18	7.18	0.00
17	Kavita Lorenz; Joti Polizoakis	Germany	59.99	31.39	28.60	7.21	6.86	7.25	7.21	7.21	0.00
18	Marie-Jade Lauriault; Romain Le Gac	France	59.97	31.18	28.79	7.39	7.00	7.29	7.14	7.18	0.00
19	Lucie Myslivečková; Lukáš Csölley	Slovakia	59.75	31.40	28.35	7.11	6.79	7.25	7.11	7.18	0.00
20	Alisa Agafonova; Alper Uçar	Turkey	59.42	29.64	29.78	7.46	7.32	7.54	7.61	7.29	0.00
21	Oleksandra Nazarova; Maksym Nikitin	Ukraine	57.97	27.26	30.71	7.64	7.46	7.75	7.79	7.75	0.00
22	Wang Shiyue; Liu Xinyu	China	57.81	29.28	29.53	7.39	7.25	7.43	7.43	7.43	1.00
23	Cortney Mansour; Michal Češka	Czech Republic	53.53	29.11	24.42	6.29	5.93	6.14	6.25	5.93	0.00
24	Adel Tankova; Ronald Zilberberg	Israel	46.66	23.85	22.81	5.75	5.61	5.75	5.86	5.54	0.00

=== Free dance ===
The free dance was held on 20 February. While Tessa Virtue and Scott Moir finished second in the free dance, they still finished first overall and won the gold medals. Their performance, set to music from Moulin Rouge!, was described by the Associated Press as "dazzling and dramatic". Their score of 122.40 was a new personal best, and their overall total score of 206.07 was a new world record. It was the second gold medal win for Virtue and Moir at the 2018 Winter Olympics, as they had been part of the Canadian team that had won the team event one week earlier. They had won gold in ice dance at the 2010 Winter Olympics, and silver twice at the 2014 Winter Olympics – one in the ice dance event and one in the team event – making them the most decorated figure skaters in Olympic history. No other figure skater at that point had won more than four Olympic medals, and with their three gold medals, they tied with Gillis Grafström of Sweden, Sonja Henie of Norway, and Irina Rodnina of the Soviet Union for winning the most Olympic gold medals in figure skating.

Gabriella Papadakis and Guillaume Cizeron finished first in the free dance, giving them an overall total score of 205.28, which, at that point, was a new world record. It was then immediately broken by Virtue and Moir. Their free dance score of 123.35 was also a new world record. Papadakis and Cizeron's free dance, set to "Moonlight Sonata" by Ludwig van Beethoven, was described by Gia Kourlas of The New York Times as "a spectacle of position and daring". She wrote that "moving as one, they [were] gossamer as they transform[ed] the ice into air".

Maia and Alex Shibutani, two-time U.S. national champions, leapfrogged over Madison Hubbell and Zachary Donohue to finish in third place. The Shibutanis, who had been part of the American team that had won the bronze medals in the team event, performed what David Brandt of the Associated Press described as a "near-flawless" routine to "Paradise" by Coldplay. Their coach, Marina Zoueva, opined that the Shibutanis had a more difficult job impressing the judges, because, as siblings, their routines lacked the romantic quality that is typical of ice dance performances. "They perform passion," Zoueva explained. "You can see it in choreography; it is not necessary to have love passion; any passion is passion." The Shibutanis praised the performances of Virtue and Moir, and Papadakis and Cizeron, and also hoped that their performance might inspire other siblings and other Asian-Americans to pursue ice dance. Hubbell and Donohue, however, made errors in their free dance, which caused them to finish in fourth place. Likewise, Madison Chock and Evan Bates, also of the United States, had a fall – an unusual occurrence in ice dance – which marred an otherwise strong performance. They ultimately finished in ninth place.

Free dance results
Pl.	Team	Nation	TSS	TES	PCS	SS	TR	PE	CO	IN	DED
1	Gabriella Papadakis; Guillaume Cizeron	France	123.35	63.98	59.37	9.79	9.75	10.00	9.93	10.00	0.00
2	Tessa Virtue; Scott Moir	Canada	122.40	63.35	59.05	9.71	9.61	9.96	9.93	10.00	0.00
3	Maia Shibutani; Alex Shibutani	United States	114.86	59.37	55.49	9.32	9.07	9.36	9.21	9.29	0.00
4	Ekaterina Bobrova; Dmitri Soloviev	(International Olympic Committee) OAR	111.45	56.25	55.20	9.14	8.89	9.29	9.32	9.36	0.00
5	Madison Hubbell; Zachary Donohue	United States	109.04	54.94	56.00	9.29	9.21	9.25	9.46	9.46	1.00
6	Anna Cappellini; Luca Lanotte	Italy	108.34	55.27	54.07	8.93	8.71	9.14	9.07	9.21	1.00
7	Kaitlyn Weaver; Andrew Poje	Canada	107.65	53.48	54.17	8.96	8.75	9.18	9.04	9.21	0.00
8	Piper Gilles; Paul Poirier	Canada	107.31	55.14	52.17	8.68	8.29	8.86	8.68	8.96	0.00
9	Charlène Guignard; Marco Fabbri	Italy	105.31	53.82	51.49	8.57	8.50	8.57	8.57	8.71	0.00
10	Penny Coomes; Nicholas Buckland	Great Britain	101.96	51.66	50.30	8.32	8.21	8.39	8.57	8.43	0.00
11	Sara Hurtado; Kirill Khaliavin	Spain	101.40	51.68	49.72	8.14	8.04	8.43	8.36	8.46	0.00
12	Madison Chock; Evan Bates	United States	100.13	49.04	53.09	8.64	8.71	8.71	9.14	9.04	2.00
13	Kana Muramoto; Chris Reed	Japan	97.22	50.75	46.47	7.64	7.54	7.86	7.75	7.93	0.00
14	Tiffany Zahorski; Jonathan Guerreiro	(International Olympic Committee) OAR	95.77	46.73	49.04	8.14	8.00	8.29	8.14	8.29	0.00
15	Natalia Kaliszek; Maksym Spodyriev	Poland	95.29	48.45	46.84	7.64	7.68	7.89	7.82	8.00	0.00
16	Kavita Lorenz; Joti Polizoakis	Germany	90.50	46.78	43.72	7.29	6.96	7.43	7.32	7.43	0.00
17	Marie-Jade Lauriault; Romain Le Gac	France	89.62	47.04	42.58	7.25	6.82	7.14	7.21	7.07	0.00
18	Alisa Agafonova; Alper Uçar	Turkey	87.76	44.01	43.75	7.25	7.11	7.21	7.50	7.39	0.00
19	Yura Min; Alexander Gamelin	South Korea	86.52	44.61	41.91	6.89	6.68	7.14	6.96	7.25	0.00
20	Lucie Myslivečková; Lukáš Csölley	Slovakia	82.82	41.65	41.17	6.82	6.61	6.82	7.00	7.07	0.00

=== Overall ===
Ice dance results
Rank	Team	Nation	Total	SD		FD	
1st place, gold medalist(s)	Tessa Virtue; Scott Moir	Canada	206.07	1	83.67	2	122.40
2nd place, silver medalist(s)	Gabriella Papadakis; Guillaume Cizeron	France	205.28	2	81.93	1	123.35
3rd place, bronze medalist(s)	Maia Shibutani; Alex Shibutani	United States	192.59	4	77.73	3	114.86
4	Madison Hubbell; Zachary Donohue	United States	187.69	3	77.75	5	109.94
5	Ekaterina Bobrova; Dmitri Soloviev	(International Olympic Committee) OAR	186.92	6	75.47	4	111.45
6	Anna Cappellini; Luca Lanotte	Italy	184.91	5	76.57	6	108.34
7	Kaitlyn Weaver; Andrew Poje	Canada	181.98	8	74.33	7	107.65
8	Piper Gilles; Paul Poirier	Canada	176.91	9	69.60	8	107.31
9	Madison Chock; Evan Bates	United States	175.58	7	75.45	12	100.13
10	Charlène Guignard; Marco Fabbri	Italy	173.47	11	68.16	9	105.31
11	Penny Coomes; Nicholas Buckland	Great Britain	170.32	10	68.36	10	101.96
12	Sara Hurtado; Kirill Khaliavin	Spain	168.33	12	66.93	11	101.40
13	Tiffany Zahorski; Jonathan Guerreiro	(International Olympic Committee) OAR	162.24	13	66.47	14	95.77
14	Natalia Kaliszek; Maksym Spodyriev	Poland	161.35	14	66.06	15	95.29
15	Kana Muramoto; Chris Reed	Japan	160.63	15	63.41	13	97.22
16	Kavita Lorenz; Joti Polizoakis	Germany	150.49	17	59.99	16	90.50
17	Marie-Jade Lauriault; Romain Le Gac	France	149.59	18	59.97	17	89.62
18	Yura Min; Alexander Gamelin	South Korea	147.74	16	61.22	19	86.52
19	Alisa Agafonova; Alper Uçar	Turkey	147.18	20	59.42	18	87.76
20	Lucie Myslivečková; Lukáš Csölley	Slovakia	142.57	19	59.75	20	82.82
21	Oleksandra Nazarova; Maksym Nikitin	Ukraine	57.97	21	57.97	Did not advance to free dance	
22	Wang Shiyue; Liu Xinyu	China	57.81	22	57.81	Did not advance to free dance	
23	Cortney Mansour; Michal Češka	Czech Republic	53.53	23	53.53	Did not advance to free dance	
24	Adel Tankova; Ronald Zilberberg	Israel	46.66	24	46.66	Did not advance to free dance	

== Records ==
The following new record high scores were set during this competition.

Record high scores
Date	Skater(s)	Segment	Score	Ref.
19 February	(Canada); Tessa Virtue; Scott Moir	Short dance	83.67	
20 February	(France); Gabriella Papadakis; Guillaume Cizeron	Free dance	123.35	
20 February	(France); Gabriella Papadakis; Guillaume Cizeron	Total score	205.28	
20 February	(Canada); Tessa Virtue; Scott Moir	Total score	206.07	

== Works cited ==
- "Special Regulations & Technical Rules – Single & Pair Skating and Ice Dance 2016". International Skating Union. p. 24. Archived from the original on 4 January 2018.
