= Aimee Buchanan =

American-Israeli figure skater

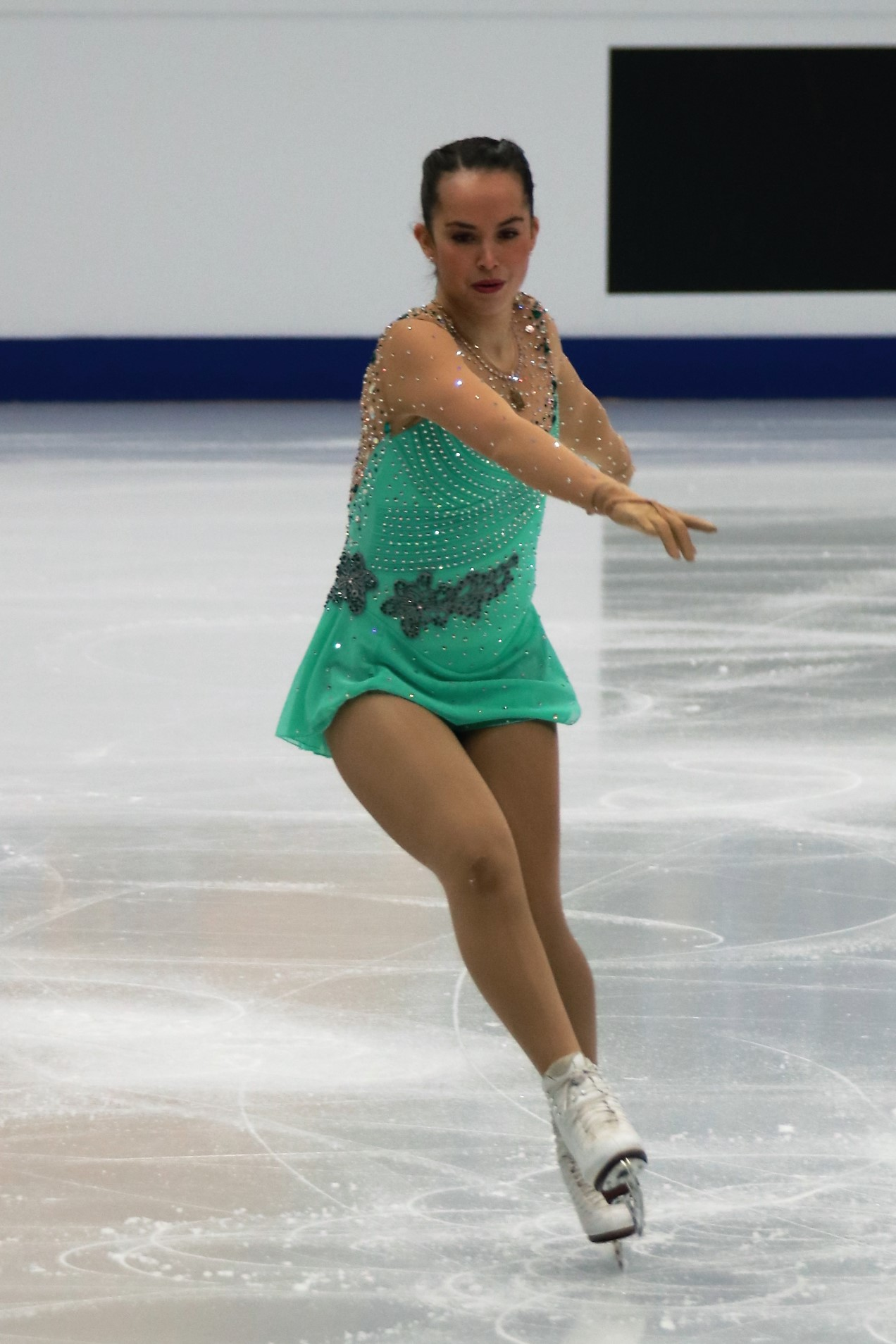
- Aimee Buchanan at the 2018 European Figure Skating Championships

Personal information
- Native name: איימי ביוקנן
- Born: June 11, 1993 (age 33)
- Height: 5 ft 5 in (1.65 m)

Figure skating career
- Country: Israel
- Coach: Peter and Darlene Cain
- Skating club: Team Cain
- Began skating: 1997
- Retired: June 16, 2019

Aimee Buchanan (Hebrew: איימי ביוקנן; born June 11, 1993) is an American-Israeli former competitive figure skater who competed in ladies' singles for Israel. She is a two-time Israeli national champion and competed in the team event at the 2018 Winter Olympics.

== Early life ==
Buchanan was born and grew up in Boston, Massachusetts, and subsequently lived in Lexington, Massachusetts, and Euless, Texas. Buchanan's mother Wendy is Jewish and is from Israel, as are both of her maternal grandparents, and Buchanan is and also identifies as Jewish. She attended synagogue on the High Holidays and Hebrew school for a few years, before sports became too demanding. She attended Endicott College and the United States Sports Academy, studying for a B.S. in Strength and Conditioning. In 2014, she became a dual American-Israeli citizen.

== Skating career ==
Buchanan began figure skating at age 4, but she did not start seriously training until age 19. While she lived in Boston, she trained at the Colonial Figure Skating Club in Boxborough, Massachusetts, with coaches Julie Graham-Eavzan and Chad Brennan, while her programs were choreographed by former Olympian Sheryl Franks. In November 2013, she came in second at the New England Regional Figure Skating Championships Newington, Connecticut.

She relocated to Texas to train with figure skating coaches Peter and Darlene Cain.

Buchanan has represented Israel three times at the European Figure Skating Championships, and was the Israeli national ladies champion in 2016. In August 2017, she had foot surgery to remove a bursa sac. She was not able to enter the Olympics single women's qualifier competition in Germany in 2017, because the qualifier was scheduled to take place on Yom Kippur.

She competed for Israel at the 2018 Winter Olympics in team figure skating in Pyeongchang, South Korea. Buchanan placed 10th in the woman's short program of the team event with a score of 46.30, an improvement of 1.23 points as compared to her personal best before that program. Israel finished in 8th place, ahead of South Korea and France, and did not qualify for the finals of the team event.

Buchanan announced her retirement from competitive skating in June 2019 after having three ankle surgeries and two injections to help with injuries. Doctors subsequently advised her against further training at a competitive level.

== Programs ==
Season	Short program	Free skating
2017–2018	Only Hope by Mandy Moore	Romantic Rhapsody by Alain Lefèvre
2016–2017	It's All Coming Back to Me Now performed by Celine Dion	Mi Mancherai performed by Josh Groban; Illuminations by Secret Garden
2015–2016	One Moment in Time by Whitney Houston	Wind Beneath My Wings performed by Charice; Wind Beneath My Wings performed by Bette Midler
2014–2015	Concierto de Aranjuez by Joaquín Rodrigo	Phantasia by Andrew Lloyd Webber; Music of the Night; Think of Me by Andrew Lloyd Webber performed by Jackie Evancho

== Results ==
CS: Challenger Series; JGP: Junior Grand Prix

=== For Israel ===
International
Event	14–15	15–16	16–17	17–18
Europeans		31st	31st	38th
CS Finlandia			16th	
CS Golden Spin			13th	
CS Ice Challenge		11th		
CS U.S. Classic		13th	8th	10th
CS Volvo Open	19th		15th	
Bavarian Open			18th	
Hellmut Seibt			14th	
Int. Challenge Cup			15th	
Nebelhorn Trophy	16th			
Philadelphia		10th		12th
Tallinn Trophy	11th			
Toruń Cup		13th		
Volvo Open Cup			15th	
National
Israeli Champ.	3rd	2nd	1st	1st
Team events
Olympics				8th T 10th P
T = Team result; P = Personal result. Medals awarded for team result only.

=== For the United States ===
National
Event	2011–12
U.S. Championships	19th

== Detailed results ==
Results in the 2017–18 season
Date	Event	SP		FS		Total	
Date	Event	P	Score	P	Score	P	Score
Aug 3–6, 2017	(United States) 2017 Philadelphia Summer International	13	42.81	13	68.21	12	111.02
Sep 13–17, 2017	(United States) 2017 CS U.S. International Classic	10	33.71	9	74.07	10	107.78
Sep 27–30, 2017	(Germany) 2017 CS Nebelhorn Trophy	30	32.42	–	–	WD	–
Jan 15–21, 2018	(Russia) 2018 European Championships	38	33.87	–	–	38	33.87
Feb 9–12, 2018	(South Korea) 2018 Winter Olympics (Team event)	10	46.40	–	–	8	–

Results in the 2016–17 season
Date	Event	SP		FS		Total	
Date	Event	P	Score	P	Score	P	Score
Sep 14–18, 2016	(United States) 2016 CS U.S. International Classic	10	37.82	7	84.70	8	122.52
Oct 6–9, 2016	(Finland) 2016 CS Finlandia Trophy	15	40.86	17	69.55	16	110.41
Nov 9–13, 2016	(Latvia) 2016 Volvo Open Cup	17	40.78	12	79.71	15	120.49
Dec 7–10, 2016	(Croatia) 2016 Golden Spin of Zagreb	17	42.87	13	85.68	13	128.55
Feb 9–12, 2017	(Slovakia) 2017 European Championships	31	38.49	–	–	31	38.49
Feb 14–19, 2017	(Germany) 2017 Bavarian Open	25	34.81	15	78.89	18	113.70
Feb 23–26, 2017	(Netherlands) 2017 Challenge Cup	16	42.16	16	75.21	15	117.37

Results in the 2015–16 season
Date	Event	SP		FS		Total	
Date	Event	P	Score	P	Score	P	Score
Jul 16–19, 2015	(United States) 2015 Philadelphia Summer International	8	37.56	11	49.20	10	86.76
Sep 16–20, 2015	(United States) 2015 CS U.S. International Classic	13	42.89	14	73.17	13	116.06
Oct 27–31, 2015	(Austria) 2015 Ice Challenge	11	45.07	13	77.76	11	112.83
Jan 6–10, 2015	(Poland) Mentor Toruń Cup	10	44.20	14	78.15	13	122.35
Jan 25–29, 2016	(Czech Republic) 2017 European Championships	31	38.49	–	–	31	38.49
Feb 17–21, 2016	(Germany) 2016 Bavarian Open	9	43.40	–	–	WD	–
Feb 23–27, 2016	(Austria) 2016 Hellmut Seibt Memorial	11	45.17	16	71.89	14	117.06

Results in the 2014–15 season
Date	Event	SP		FS		Total	
Date	Event	P	Score	P	Score	P	Score
Sep 24–27, 2015	(Germany) 2014 CS Nebelhorn Trophy	16	34.47	15	60.66	16	95.13
Nov 5–9, 2014	(Latvia) 2014 CS Volvo Open Cup	18	37.61	18	59.60	19	97.21
Dec 3–7, 2014	(Estonia) 2014 Tallinn Trophy	10	40.35	11	72.66	11	113.01

=== For the United States ===
Results in the 2011–12 season
Date	Event	SP		FS		Total	
Date	Event	P	Score	P	Score	P	Score
Jan 22–29, 2012	(United States) 2012 U.S. Championships	19	37.77	19	64.12	19	101.89
