= Paige Conners =

American-Israeli pair skater

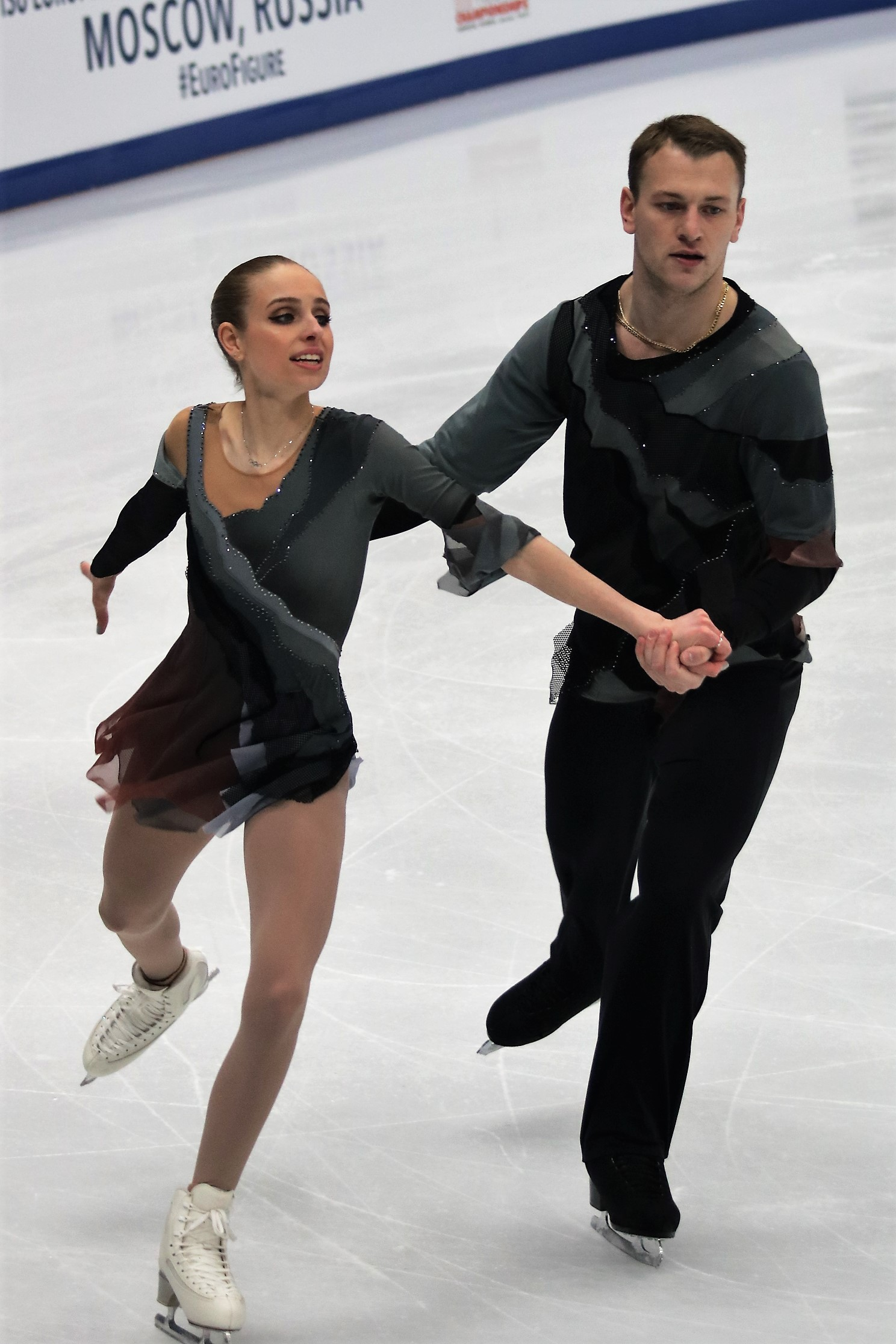
- Conners with Krasnopolski at the 2018 European Championships

Personal information
- Born: 9 April 2000 (age 26) Pittsford, New York, United States
- Home town: Pittsford, New York, United States
- Height: 1.68 m (5 ft 6 in)

Figure skating career
- Country: Israel
- Partner: Evgeni Krasnopolski
- Coach: Galit Chait, Anton Nimenko
- Skating club: Ice Holon Israel
- Began skating: 2003

Paige Conners (born 9 April 2000) is an American-Israeli pair skater. With her skating partner, Evgeni Krasnopolski, she is the 2017 CS Minsk-Arena Ice Star bronze medalist. She competed for Israel at the 2018 Winter Olympics in Figure Skating in pairs skating and a team event in Pyeongchang, South Korea.

== Personal life ==
Conners was born on April 9, 2000, in Pittsford, New York, United States, the daughter of Karen (a reading teacher) and Mark Conners (a dentist) Her mother, who is from Buffalo, has Israeli citizenship. She later moved to Edgewater, New Jersey. She has dual American-Israeli citizenship.

== Career ==
Conners began learning to skate in 2003. Representing Israel in ladies' singles, she placed 27th at the 2017 World Junior Championships in Taipei, Taiwan. She was coached by Galit Chait, Gilberto Viadana, and Michela Boschetto.

Switching to pair skating, Conners teamed up with Israel's Evgeni Krasnopolski in March 2017. The pair decided to train in Hackensack, New Jersey, coached by Galit Chait and Anton Nimenko.

Making their international debut, Conners/Krasnopolski placed 5th at the 2017 CS U.S. Classic in September. Later the same month, they placed 8th at the 2017 CS Nebelhorn Trophy, the final qualifying opportunity for the 2018 Winter Olympics. Due to their result, Israel received a spot in the Olympic pairs event. In October, the two won the bronze medal at the 2017 CS Minsk-Arena Ice Star.

In November 2017, Conners/Krasnopolski were named in Israel's Olympic team. In January 2018, they finished 9th at the 2018 European Championships in Moscow, Russia.

She competed for Israel at the 2018 Winter Olympics in Figure Skating in pair skating (coming in 19th) and a team event in Pyeongchang, South Korea.

== Programs ==
=== Pair skating ===
Season	Short program	Free skating
2017–2018	Ghost the Musical by David A. Stewart, Glen Ballard choreo. by Galit Chait	Schindler's List by John Williams choreo. by Galit Chait

=== Single skating ===
Season	Short program	Free skating
2016–2017	Love Theme (from Cinema Paradiso) by Ennio Morricone choreo. by Galit Chait, Jeffrey Buttle	Now We Are Free (Gladiator) performed by Lisa Gerrard choreo. by Galit Chait, Jeffrey Buttle

== Competitive highlights ==
CS: Challenger Series

=== Pairs with Krasnopolski ===
International
Event	2017–18
Olympics	19th
World Championships	19th
European Championships	9th
CS Ice Star	3rd
CS Nebelhorn Trophy	8th
CS U.S. Classic	5th
Team events
Olympics	8th T 9th P

=== Ladies' singles ===
International
Event	2016–17
World Junior Championships	27th
Bavarian Open	4th J
Santa Claus Cup	3rd J
Tallinn Trophy	5th J
J = Junior level

== See also ==
- List of notable Jewish figure skaters
