= Adel Tankova =

Israeli figure skater

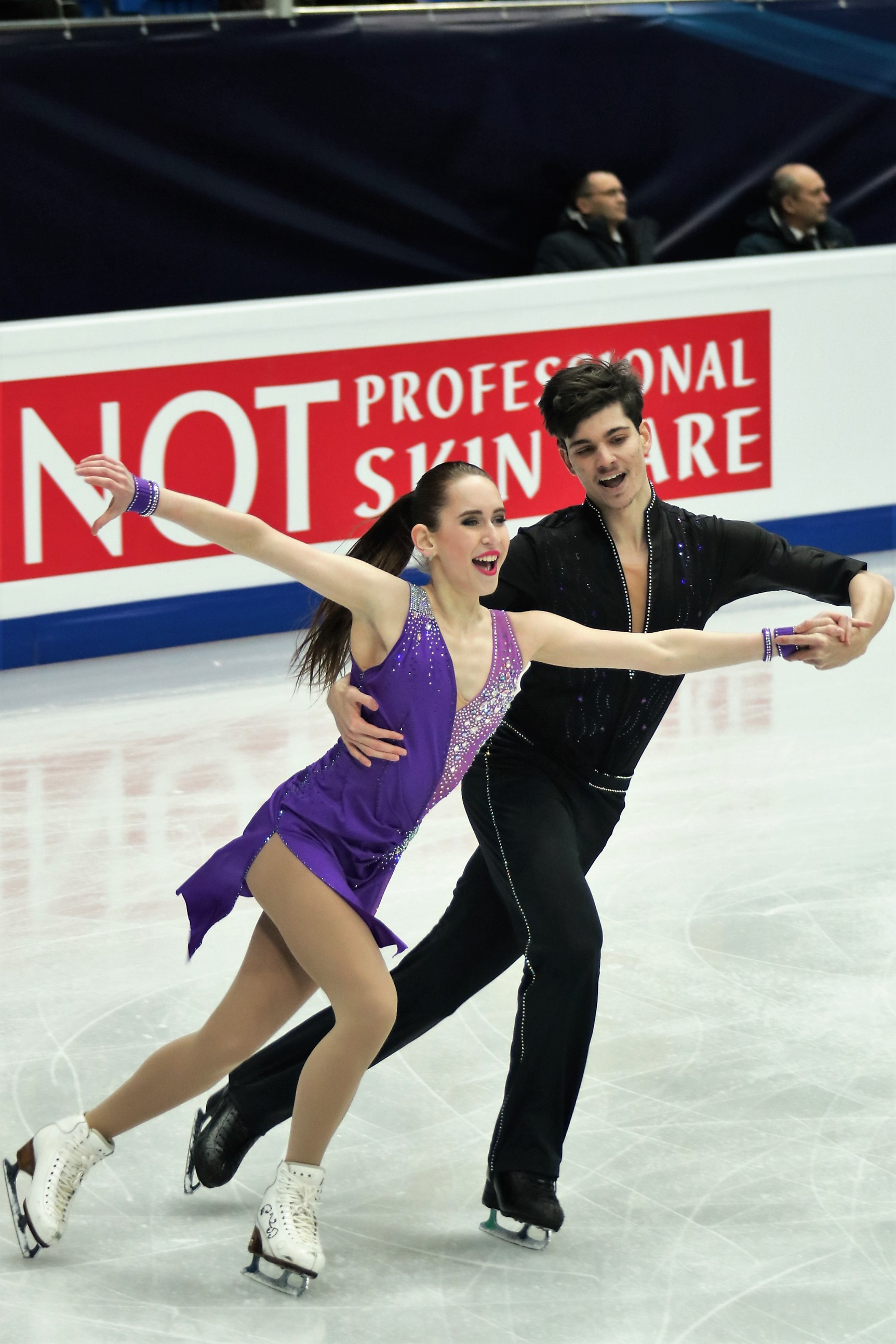

Personal information
- Native name: אדל טנקובה
- Nationality: Israeli
- Born: 22 May 2000 (age 25) Dnipro, Ukraine
- Height: 1.63 m (5 ft 4 in)

Sport
- Country: Israel
- Sport: Figure skating
- Partner: Ronald Zilberberg
- Former partner: Evgeni Krasnopolski
- Coached by: Galit Chait Moracci

Adel Tankova (Note: Hebrew: אדל טנקובה, romanized: Edal Ṭenḳuvah; Ukrainian: Адель Танкова, romanized: Adel Tankova) (Hebrew: אדל טנקובה; born 22 May 2000) is an Israeli Olympic figure skater. She competed for Israel at the 2018 Winter Olympics with Ronald Zilberberg in Figure Skating in ice dancing and a team event in Pyeongchang, South Korea.

== Early and personal life ==
Tankova was born in Dnipro (formerly known as Dnipropetrovsk), Ukraine, and is Jewish. Her hometown is Hackensack, New Jersey.

== Career ==
Tankova began skating in 2004. Her former partner in pairs was Evgeni Krasnopolski. Her current partner is Ronald Zilberberg, with whom she began competing in 2016. Her coach and choreographer is Galit Chait Moracci.

In 2017/2018, the pair won the Israeli National Championship, and came in 28th in the ISU European Ice Dance Championship.

Tankova and Zilberberg competed for Israel at the 2018 Winter Olympics in Figure Skating in ice dancing and a team event in Pyeongchang, South Korea. They scored 46.66 in the short dance event for an overall finish of 24th place.

== Competitive highlights ==
=== With Zilberberg ===
Competition placements at senior level
Season	2016–17	2017–18
Winter Olympics		24th
Winter Olympics (Team event)		8th
World Championships		31st
European Championships	30th	28th
Golden Spin of Zagreb	16th	17th
Ice Star		13th
Tallinn Trophy	18th	
Toruń Cup		8th
U.S International Classic		9th
Volvo Open	5th	

=== With Krasnopolski ===
Competition placements at senior level
Season	2015–16
World Championships	19th
European Championships	13th
CS Mordovian Ornament	7th
CS U.S International Classic	6th
Toruń Cup	4th

== Detailed results ==
=== With Zilberberg ===
Results in the 2017–18 season
Date	Event	SP		FS		Total	
Date	Event	P	Score	P	Score	P	Score
Sep 13–17, 2017	(United States) 2017 CS U.S. International Classic	9	40.26	9	62.33	9	102.59
Oct 26–29, 2017	(Belarus) 2017 CS Ice Star	14	45.11	13	67.34	13	112.45
Dec 6–9, 2017	(Croatia) 2017 CS Golden Spin of Zagreb	18	41.74	17	68.66	17	110.40
Jan 15–21, 2018	(Russia) 2018 European Championships	28	40.20	–	–	28	40.20
Jan 30–Feb 4, 2018	(Poland) 2018 Toruń Cup	6	56.01	9	78.70	8	134.71
Feb 9–12, 2018	(South Korea) 2018 Winter Olympics (Team event)	10	44.61	–	–	8	–
Feb 14–23, 2018	(South Korea) 2018 Winter Olympics	24	46.66	–	–	24	46.66
Mar 19–25, 2018	(Italy) 2018 World Championships	31	43.50	–	–	31	43.50

Results in the 2016–17 season
Date	Event	SP		FS		Total	
Date	Event	P	Score	P	Score	P	Score
Nov 9–13, 2016	(Latvia) 2016 Volvo Open	6	44.54	5	61.23	5	105.77
Nov 19–27, 2016	(Estonia) 2016 CS Tallinn Trophy	16	48.37	19	62.94	18	111.31
Dec 7–10, 2016	(Croatia) 2016 CS Golden Spin of Zagreb	15	41.36	15	69.18	16	110.54
Jan 25–29, 2017	(Czech Republic) 2017 European Championships	30	38.49	–	–	30	38.49

=== With Krasnopolski ===
Results in the 2015–16 season
Date	Event	SP		FS		Total	
Date	Event	P	Score	P	Score	P	Score
Sep 16–20, 2015	(United States) 2015 CS U.S. International Classic	6	36.44	6	65.30	6	101.74
Oct 15–18, 2015	(Russia) 2015 CS Mordovian Ornament	5	40.54	7	78.46	7	119.00
Jan 6–10, 2016	(Poland) 2015 Toruń Cup	4	48.38	4	91.03	4	139.41
Jan 25–29, 2016	(Slovakia) 2016 European Championships	14	37.81	13	76.75	13	114.56
Mar 28–Apr 3, 2016	(United States) 2016 World Championships	19	46.81	–	–	19	46.81
