= Figure skating at the 2018 Winter Olympics – Team event =

Team event at the XXIII Olympic Winter Games
- Venue: Gangneung Ice Arena; Gangneung, South Korea
- Dates: 9–12 February 2018
- Competitors: 70 from 10 nations
- Teams: 10
- Winning score: 73 points

Medalists
| 1st place, gold medalist(s) | | Canada; Patrick Chan, Kaetlyn Osmond, Gabrielle Daleman, Meagan Duhamel, Eric Radford, Tessa Virtue, Scott Moir |
| 2nd place, silver medalist(s) | | Olympic Athletes from Russia; Mikhail Kolyada, Evgenia Medvedeva, Alina Zagitova, Evgenia Tarasova, Vladimir Morozov, Natalia Zabiiako, Alexander Enbert, Ekaterina Bobrova, Dmitri Soloviev |
| 3rd place, bronze medalist(s) | | United States; Nathan Chen, Adam Rippon, Bradie Tennell, Mirai Nagasu, Alexa Scimeca Knierim, Chris Knierim, Maia Shibutani, Alex Shibutani |

The figure skating team event at the 2018 Winter Olympics was held from 9 to 12 February at the Gangneung Ice Arena in Gangneung, South Korea. The team event consisted of competitions in men's singles, women's singles, pair skating, and ice dance. Skaters and teams earned points based on their placements in each event, and the medalists were determined based on the total points earned. Ultimately, the team from Canada won the gold, the team representing the Olympic Athletes from Russia won the silver, and the team from the United States won the bronze. During the course of the competition, Evgenia Medvedeva of Russia set a new world record score in the women's short program.

== Background ==
The team event is the newest Olympic figure skating event and was first contested at the 2014 Winter Olympics. The event combines the four Olympic figure skating disciplines (men's singles, women's singles, pair skating, and ice dance) into a single event; skaters earn points based on their placement in each discipline, and the gold medals are awarded to the team that earns the most placement points. At the 2014 Winter Olympics, the team from Russia won the team event, while the team from Canada finished in second place, and the team from the United States finished third.

In 2016, an independent report commissioned by the World Anti-Doping Agency confirmed allegations that the Russian Olympic team had been involved in a state-sponsored doping program from at least late 2011 through February 2014, when Russia hosted the Winter Olympics in Sochi. On 5 December 2017, the International Olympic Committee announced that the Russian Olympic Committee had been suspended from the 2018 Winter Olympics. Athletes with no previous drug violations and a consistent history of drug testing were permitted to compete under the Olympic flag as an "Olympic Athlete from Russia" (OAR). Under the terms of the decree, neither the Russian flag nor anthem were to be used at the Olympics; the Olympic flag and Olympic Anthem were used instead.

The figure skating team event was one of five figure skating competitions contested at the 2018 Winter Olympics in Gangneung, South Korea. It was held at the Gangneung Ice Arena over three days between 9 and 12 February. The 2018 Winter Olympics were the first to allow vocal music for all skating disciplines; the International Skating Union modified its policies which had limited skaters in single and pair skating to the use of only instrumental music after the 2014 Winter Olympics. The team from Canada was predicted to be the Russians' biggest challenge in defending their gold-medal win from 2014. Patrick Chan, Tessa Virtue, Scott Moir, Meagan Duhamel, and Eric Radford were all members of the Canadian team that had won the silver in 2014. Chan, Virtue, and Moir had all come out of retirement with the express purpose of again competing at the 2018 Winter Olympics. Patrick Chan was at that point a three-time world champion, two-time Four Continents champion, and seven-time Canadian national champion. Tessa Virtue and Scott Moir had already won three Olympic medals – gold in ice dance in 2010 and silver in ice dance in 2014, in addition to the silver from the 2014 team event – and were three-time world champions, three-time Four Continents champions, and eight-time Canadian national champions. Meagan Duhamel and Eric Radford were two-time world champions in pair skating, two-time Four Continents champions, and seven-time Canadian national champions.

== Qualification ==
For the team event, scores from the 2017 World Figure Skating Championships and the 2017–18 Grand Prix Series were tabulated to establish the top ten nations. For a nation to qualify for the team event, it had to have qualified entrants in at least three of the four disciplines (men's singles, women's singles, pair skating, or ice dance). If there were not ten nations that had qualified entrants in all four disciplines, nations with only three entrants could use the ISU's "Additional Athletes Quota" to complete their team. These additional athletes were eligible to compete in the team event but not in the individual Olympic figure skating events.

Qualification for figure skating team event
| Pl. | Nation | M | W | P | D | Total |
|---|---|---|---|---|---|---|
| 1 | Canada | Yes | Yes | Yes | Yes | 6084 |
| 2 | (International Olympic Committee) OAR | Yes | Yes | Yes | Yes | 5924 |
| 3 | United States | Yes | Yes | Yes | Yes | 5055 |
| 4 | Japan | Yes | Yes | Yes | Yes | 4345 |
| 5 | China | Yes | Yes | Yes | Yes | 4231 |
| 6 | Italy | Yes | Yes | Yes | Yes | 3801 |
| 7 | France | Yes | Yes | Yes | Yes | 3652 |
| 8 | Germany | Yes | Yes | Yes | Yes | 2806 |
| 9 | Israel | Yes | (Note: Although Israel did not qualify a women's singles skater for the team event, they were able to use the Additional Athletes Quota to complete their team.) | Yes | Yes | 1521 |
| 10 | South Korea | Yes | Yes | (Note: Although South Korea did not qualify a pair skating team through the normal process, as the host nation, they were still able to enter a team in the 2018 Winter Olympics.) | Yes | 1397 |

== Entries ==
Code key

- SP – Short program
- FS – Free skate
- SD – Short dance
- FD – Free dance

Member nations submitted the following entrants for the indicated segments in each discipline.

Team event entrants
| Country | Men | Women | Pairs | Ice dance | Ref. |
|---|---|---|---|---|---|
| Canada | Patrick Chan (SP/FS) | Kaetlyn Osmond (SP) | Meagan Duhamel; Eric Radford; (SP/FS) | Tessa Virtue; Scott Moir; (SD/FD) | |
| Canada | Patrick Chan (SP/FS) | Gabrielle Daleman (FS) | Meagan Duhamel; Eric Radford; (SP/FS) | Tessa Virtue; Scott Moir; (SD/FD) | |
| China | Yan Han (SP) | Li Xiangning (SP) | Yu Xiaoyu; Zhang Hao; (SP) | Wang Shiyue; Liu Xinyu; (SD) | |
| France | Chafik Besseghier (SP) | Maé-Bérénice Méité (SP) | Vanessa James; Morgan Ciprès; (SP) | Marie-Jade Lauriault; Romain Le Gac; (SD) | |
| Germany | Paul Fentz (SP) | Nicole Schott (SP) | Aliona Savchenko; Bruno Massot; (SP) | Kavita Lorenz; Joti Polizoakis; (SD) | |
| Israel | Alexei Bychenko (SP) | Aimee Buchanan (SP) | Paige Conners; Evgeni Krasnopolski; (SP) | Adel Tankova; Ronald Zilberberg; (SD) | |
| Italy | Matteo Rizzo (SP/FS) | Carolina Kostner (SP/FS) | Nicole Della Monica; Matteo Guarise; (SP) | Anna Cappellini; Luca Lanotte; (SD/FD) | |
| Italy | Matteo Rizzo (SP/FS) | Carolina Kostner (SP/FS) | Valentina Marchei; Ondrej Hotarek; (FS) | Anna Cappellini; Luca Lanotte; (SD/FD) | |
| Japan | Shoma Uno (SP) | Satoko Miyahara (SP) | Miu Suzaki; Ryuichi Kihara; (SP/FS) | Kana Muramoto; Chris Reed; (SD/FD) | |
| Japan | Keiji Tanaka (FS) | Kaori Sakamoto (FS) | Miu Suzaki; Ryuichi Kihara; (SP/FS) | Kana Muramoto; Chris Reed; (SD/FD) | |
| Olympic Athletes from Russia | Mikhail Kolyada (SP/FS) | Evgenia Medvedeva (SP) | Evgenia Tarasova; Vladimir Morozov; (SP) | Ekaterina Bobrova; Dmitri Soloviev; (SD/FD) | |
| Olympic Athletes from Russia | Mikhail Kolyada (SP/FS) | Alina Zagitova (FS) | Natalia Zabiiako; Alexander Enbert; (FS) | Ekaterina Bobrova; Dmitri Soloviev; (SD/FD) | |
| South Korea | Cha Jun-hwan (SP) | Choi Da-bin (SP) | Kim Kyu-eun; Alex Kam; (SP) | Yura Min; Alexander Gamelin; (SD) | |
| United States | Nathan Chen (SP) | Bradie Tennell (SP) | Alexa Scimeca Knierim; Chris Knierim; (SP/FS) | Maia Shibutani; Alex Shibutani; (SD/FD) | |
| United States | Adam Rippon (FS) | Mirai Nagasu (FS) | Alexa Scimeca Knierim; Chris Knierim; (SP/FS) | Maia Shibutani; Alex Shibutani; (SD/FD) | |

== Required performance elements ==
=== Single skating ===
Men competing in the team event performed their short programs on 9 February, while women performed theirs on 11 February. Lasting 2 minutes 40 seconds (+/− 10 seconds), the short program for men and women had to include the following elements:

For men: one double or triple Axel; one triple or quadruple jump immediately preceded by connecting steps; one jump combination consisting of a double jump and a triple jump, two triple jumps, or a quadruple jump and a double jump or triple jump; one flying spin; one camel spin or sit spin with a change of foot; one spin combination with a change of foot; and a step sequence using the full ice surface.

For women: one double or triple Axel; one triple jump immediately preceded by connecting steps; one jump combination consisting of a double jump and a triple jump, or two triple jumps; one layback spin, sideways leaning spin, camel spin, or sit spin without a change of foot; one spin combination with a change of foot; and a step sequence using the full ice surface.

The five teams with the most points after the first round advanced to the final round. Regardless of their scores in the short program, the men and women from the top five teams performed their free skates on 12 February.

For men: Lasting 4 minutes 30 seconds (+/− 10 seconds), the free skate for men had to include the following: eight jump elements, of which one had to be an Axel-type jump; three spins, of which one had to be a spin combination, one a flying spin, and one a spin with only one position; a step sequence; and a choreographic sequence.

For women: Lasting 4 minutes (+/− 10 seconds), the free skate for women had to include the following: seven jump elements, of which one had to be an Axel-type jump; three spins, of which one had to be a spin combination, one a flying spin, and one a spin with only one position; a step sequence; and a choreographic sequence.

=== Pair skating ===
Pairs competing in the team event performed their short programs on 9 February. Lasting 2 minutes 40 seconds (+/− 10 seconds), the short program had to include the following elements: one hip lift, one double or triple twist lift, one double or triple throw jump, one double or triple solo jump, one pair spin combination with a change of foot, one death spiral, and a step sequence using the full ice surface.

The five teams with the most points after the first round advanced to the final round. Regardless of their scores in the short program, the couples from the top five teams performed their free skates on 11 February. Lasting 4 minutes 30 seconds (+/− 10 seconds), the free skate had to include the following: three pair lifts, one twist lift, two different throw jumps, one solo jump, one jump combination or sequence, one pair spin combination, one death spiral; and a choreographic sequence.

=== Ice dance ===
Ice dance couples competing in the team event performed their short dances on 11 February. Lasting 2 minutes 50 seconds (+/− 10 seconds), teams had to choose from one of the following rhythms: cha-cha, rhumba, samba, mambo, meringue, salsa, bachata, or any closely related Latin American rhythm. The required pattern dance element was the rhumba. The short dance had to include the following elements: the pattern dance element, one dance lift, one pattern dance step sequence while in hold, one step sequence while not touching, and one set of sequential twizzles.

The five teams with the most points after the first round advanced to the final round. Regardless of their scores in the short dance, the couples from the top five teams performed their free dances on 12 February. Lasting 4 minutes (+/− 10 seconds), the free dance had to include the following: one short lift and one combination lift, or three short lifts; one dance spin; one set of synchronized twizzles; one straight-line step sequence while in hold; one curved step sequence while in hold; and two choreographic elements.

== Judging ==
Skaters were judged according to the required technical elements of their program (such as jumps and spins), as well as the overall presentation of their program, based on five program components (skating skills, transitions, performance, composition, and musical interpretation/timing). Each technical element in a figure skating performance was assigned a predetermined base point value and scored by a panel of nine judges on a scale from −3 to +3 based on the quality of its execution. Each Grade of Execution (GOE) from –3 to +3 was assigned a value as indicated on the Scale of Values. For example, a triple Axel was worth a base value of 8.50 points, and a GOE of +3 was worth 3.00 points, so a triple Axel with a GOE of +3 earned 11.50 points. The judging panel's GOE for each element was determined by calculating the trimmed mean (the average after discarding the highest and lowest scores). The panel's scores for all elements were added together to generate a Total Elements Score. At the same time, the judges evaluated each performance based on the five aforementioned program components and assigned each a score from 0.25 to 10 in 0.25-point increments. The judging panel's final score for each program component was also determined by calculating the trimmed mean. Those scores were then multiplied by the factor shown on the chart below; the results were added together to generate a total Program Component Score.

Program component factoring
| Discipline | Short program or Short dance | Free skate or Free dance |
|---|---|---|
| Men | 1.00 | 2.00 |
| Women | 0.80 | 1.60 |
| Pairs | 0.80 | 1.60 |
| Ice dance | 0.80 | 1.20 |

Deductions were applied for certain violations, such as time infractions, stops and restarts, or falls. The Total Elements Score and Program Component Score were then added together, minus any deductions, to generate a final performance score for each skater or team.

== Team event scoring ==
The ten skaters or teams in each discipline performed their short programs and short dances first, and they were judged just as they would be at any other figure skating competition. The skater or team in each discipline who received the highest score earned ten points, the next highest score earned nine points, and so on. Once all four events were held, the points earned in each event were totaled, and the five teams with the highest totals moved on to the final round. Teams could elect to substitute up to two skaters or teams at this point. The five skaters or teams in each discipline then performed their free skates and free dances, and again received scores from the judges. The skater or team in each discipline who received the highest score earned ten points, and so on. Once all four events were held, the points earned over both rounds were totaled to determine the medalists.

== Medal summary ==
Medal summary
| Gold | Silver | Bronze |
|---|---|---|
| Canada: Patrick Chan; Kaetlyn Osmond; Gabrielle Daleman; Meagan Duhamel; Eric Radford; Tessa Virtue; Scott Moir | (International Olympic Committee) OAR: Mikhail Kolyada; Evgenia Medvedeva; Alina Zagitova; Evgenia Tarasova; Vladimir Morozov; Natalia Zabiiako; Alexander Enbert; Ekaterina Bobrova; Dmitri Soloviev | United States: Nathan Chen; Adam Rippon; Bradie Tennell; Mirai Nagasu; Alexa Scimeca Knierim; Chris Knierim; Maia Shibutani; Alex Shibutani |

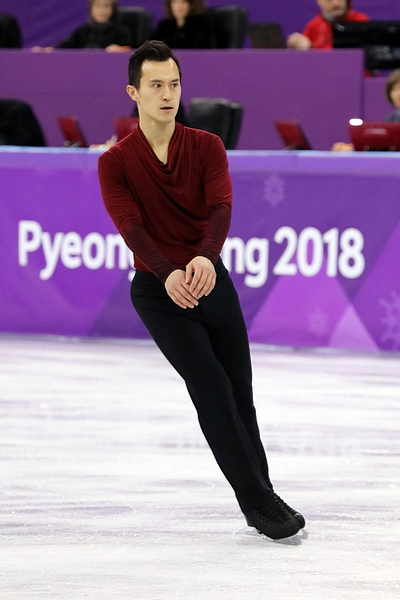
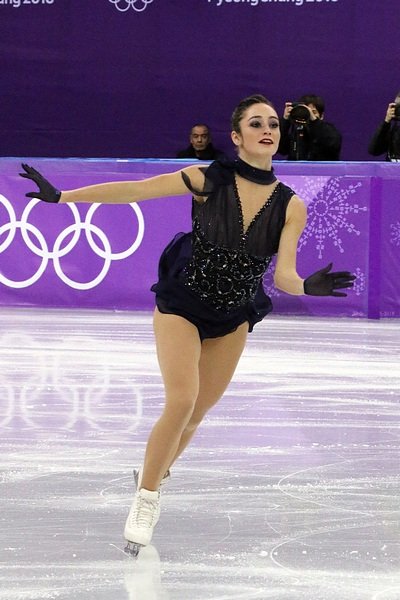
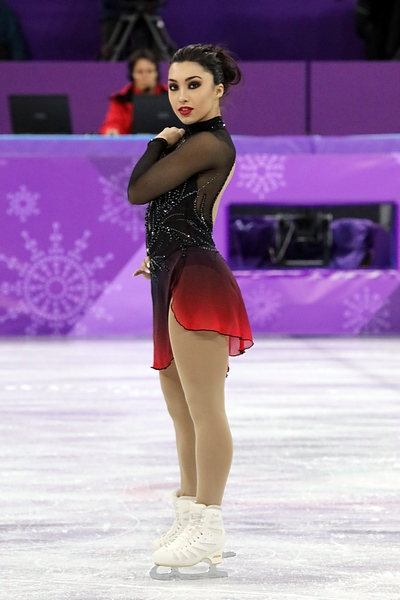
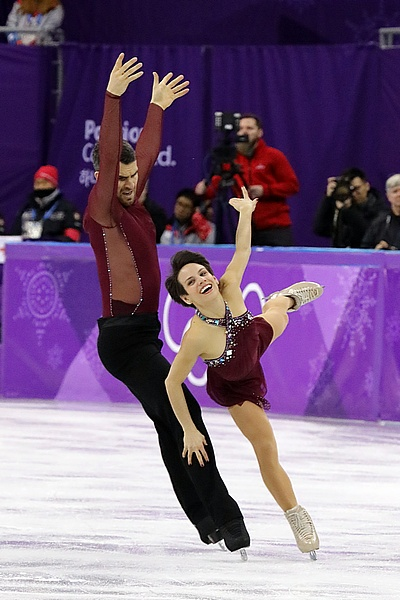
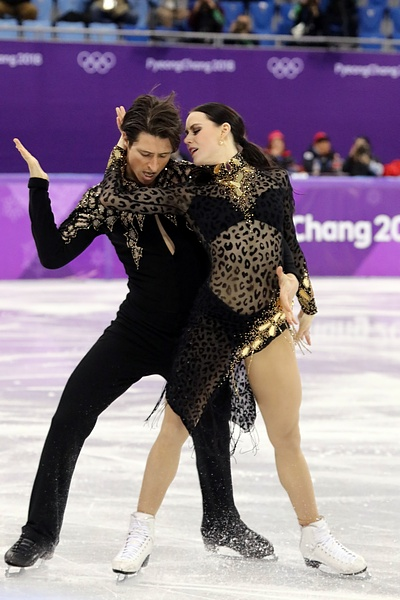
The Canadian figure skating team and gold medalists from the 2018 Winter Olympics (from left to right):
Patrick Chan; Kaetlyn Osmond; Gabrielle Daleman; Meagan Duhamel and Eric Radford; and Tessa Virtue and Scott Moir

== Results (qualifying round) ==
Code key

- TSS – Total Segment Score
- TES – Total Elements Score
- PCS – Program Component Score
- SS – Skating skills
- TR – Transitions
- PE – Performance
- CO – Composition
- IN – Musical interpretation/Timing
- DED – Deductions

=== Men's singles ===
The men's short program was held on 9 February. Shoma Uno of Japan was the only skater in the men's event to deliver a clean performance, which included a quadruple toe loop-triple toe loop jump combination and a triple Axel. Alexei Bychenko of Israel finished in second place, while Patrick Chan of Canada finished third. Chan fell on his opening quadruple jump and then on his triple Axel. Nathan Chen of the United States, who had been heavily favored to win an Olympic medal, made a series of uncharacteristic errors that landed him in fourth place. He fell on his triple Axel and landed his planned quadruple toe loop as a double. Chen cited the early time of the event as a factor in his poor performance: the team events began at ten o'clock in the morning in order to accommodate primetime television viewing in the United States. Mikhail Kolyada of Russia fell twice, once on his quadruple Lutz and then on his quadruple loop, and then landed his planned triple Axel as a single. He ultimately finished in eighth place.

Men's short program results
| Pl. | Skater | Nation | TSS | TES | PCS | SS | TR | PE | CO | IN | DED | Pts. |
|---|---|---|---|---|---|---|---|---|---|---|---|---|
| 1 | Shoma Uno | Japan | 103.25 | 56.64 | 46.61 | 9.36 | 9.25 | 9.25 | 9.39 | 9.36 | 0.00 | 10 |
| 2 | Alexei Bychenko | Israel | 88.49 | 47.59 | 40.90 | 8.07 | 7.82 | 8.43 | 8.29 | 8.29 | 0.00 | 9 |
| 3 | Patrick Chan | Canada | 81.66 | 38.56 | 45.10 | 9.21 | 9.07 | 8.50 | 9.14 | 9.18 | 2.00 | 8 |
| 4 | Nathan Chen | United States | 80.61 | 37.73 | 43.88 | 8.89 | 8.75 | 8.46 | 8.96 | 8.82 | 1.00 | 7 |
| 5 | Matteo Rizzo | Italy | 77.77 | 40.60 | 37.17 | 7.39 | 7.18 | 7.64 | 7.50 | 7.46 | 0.00 | 6 |
| 6 | Cha Jun-hwan | South Korea | 77.70 | 40.71 | 36.99 | 7.46 | 7.25 | 7.46 | 7.46 | 7.36 | 0.00 | 5 |
| 7 | Yan Han | China | 77.10 | 38.28 | 40.82 | 8.46 | 8.07 | 7.71 | 8.29 | 8.29 | 2.00 | 4 |
| 8 | Mikhail Kolyada | (International Olympic Committee) OAR | 74.36 | 33.75 | 42.61 | 8.75 | 8.31 | 8.11 | 8.75 | 8.61 | 2.00 | 3 |
| 9 | Paul Fentz | Germany | 66.32 | 34.54 | 33.78 | 6.96 | 6.61 | 6.39 | 7.00 | 6.82 | 2.00 | 2 |
| 10 | Chafik Besseghier | France | 61.06 | 26.93 | 34.13 | 6.96 | 6.50 | 6.71 | 6.96 | 7.00 | 0.00 | 1 |

=== Pairs ===
The pairs' short program was held on 9 February. Evgenia Tarasova and Vladimir Morozov of Russia finished in first place with a new season's best score, while Meagan Duhamel and Eric Radford of Canada finished in second. Duhamel and Radford's strong performance was enough to put the Canadian team in the lead after the first day, because Tarasova and Morozov's first-place finish was not enough to offset Mikhail Kolyada's eighth-place finish in the men's event. Alexa Scimeca-Knierim and Chris Knierim of the United States finished in fourth place, producing what Madison Hubbell and Zachary Donohue, U.S. national ice dance champions, described as "their best short program ever". The Knierims' only noticeable error was a slip at the end by Alexa Knierim. They successfully performed side-by-side triple flips and a throw triple flip, and put the American team in second place at the end of the first day. The Russian and Japanese teams were at this point tied for third place.

Pairs' short program results
| Pl. | Team | Nation | TSS | TES | PCS | SS | TR | PE | CO | IN | DED | Pts. |
|---|---|---|---|---|---|---|---|---|---|---|---|---|
| 1 | Evgenia Tarasova; Vladimir Morozov | (International Olympic Committee) OAR | 80.92 | 43.78 | 37.14 | 9.43 | 9.07 | 9.39 | 9.32 | 9.21 | 0.00 | 10 |
| 2 | Meagan Duhamel; Eric Radford | Canada | 76.57 | 41.08 | 35.49 | 8.82 | 8.71 | 9.00 | 8.96 | 8.86 | 0.00 | 9 |
| 3 | Aliona Savchenko; Bruno Massot | Germany | 75.36 | 39.33 | 37.03 | 9.21 | 9.18 | 9.21 | 9.36 | 9.32 | 1.00 | 8 |
| 4 | Alexa Scimeca Knierim; Chris Knierim | United States | 69.75 | 38.41 | 31.34 | 7.86 | 7.57 | 7.96 | 7.89 | 7.89 | 0.00 | 7 |
| 5 | Yu Xiaoyu; Zhang Hao | China | 69.17 | 37.20 | 32.97 | 8.29 | 8.14 | 8.07 | 8.43 | 8.29 | 1.00 | 6 |
| 6 | Vanessa James; Morgan Ciprès | France | 68.49 | 34.66 | 33.83 | 8.46 | 8.39 | 8.29 | 8.57 | 8.57 | 0.00 | 5 |
| 7 | Nicole Della Monica; Matteo Guarise | Italy | 67.62 | 35.73 | 31.89 | 7.93 | 7.71 | 8.04 | 8.07 | 8.11 | 0.00 | 4 |
| 8 | Miu Suzaki; Ryuichi Kihara | Japan | 57.42 | 32.13 | 25.29 | 6.54 | 6.07 | 6.39 | 6.25 | 6.36 | 0.00 | 3 |
| 9 | Paige Conners; Evgeni Krasnopolski | Israel | 54.47 | 30.70 | 24.77 | 6.25 | 5.96 | 6.25 | 6.39 | 6.11 | 1.00 | 2 |
| 10 | Kim Kyu-eun; Alex Kam | South Korea | 52.10 | 27.70 | 24.40 | 6.18 | 5.82 | 6.21 | 6.18 | 6.11 | 0.00 | 1 |

=== Ice dance ===
The short dance was held on 11 February. Tessa Virtue and Scott Moir of Canada finished in first place. Their performance, set to a medley of music by the Rolling Stones and the Eagles, was described by the Associated Press as if they were "dancing along the Copacabana beach". Their score was five points higher than that of Maya and Alex Shibutani of the United States, who performed to a medley of music from Pérez Prado. Ekaterina Bobrova and Dmitri Soloviev of Russia finished in third place.

Short dance results
| Pl. | Team | Nation | TSS | TES | PCS | SS | TR | PE | CO | IN | DED | Pts. |
|---|---|---|---|---|---|---|---|---|---|---|---|---|
| 1 | Tessa Virtue; Scott Moir | Canada | 80.51 | 41.61 | 38.90 | 9.61 | 9.54 | 9.86 | 9.79 | 9.82 | 0.00 | 10 |
| 2 | Maia Shibutani; Alex Shibutani | United States | 75.46 | 38.42 | 37.04 | 9.32 | 9.11 | 9.29 | 9.36 | 9.21 | 0.00 | 9 |
| 3 | Ekaterina Bobrova; Dmitri Soloviev | (International Olympic Committee) OAR | 74.76 | 38.11 | 36.65 | 9.14 | 9.00 | 9.18 | 9.29 | 9.21 | 0.00 | 8 |
| 4 | Anna Cappellini; Luca Lanotte | Italy | 72.51 | 37.31 | 36.20 | 8.89 | 8.71 | 9.29 | 9.07 | 9.29 | 1.00 | 7 |
| 5 | Kana Muramoto; Chris Reed | Japan | 62.15 | 32.17 | 29.98 | 7.54 | 7.32 | 7.46 | 7.57 | 7.57 | 0.00 | 6 |
| 6 | Marie-Jade Lauriault; Romain Le Gac | France | 57.94 | 29.08 | 28.86 | 7.25 | 7.11 | 7.21 | 7.25 | 7.25 | 0.00 | 5 |
| 7 | Wang Shiyue; Liu Xinyu | China | 56.98 | 27.75 | 29.23 | 7.29 | 7.11 | 7.39 | 7.39 | 7.36 | 0.00 | 4 |
| 8 | Kavita Lorenz; Joti Polizoakis | Germany | 56.88 | 28.97 | 27.91 | 6.96 | 6.75 | 7.04 | 7.14 | 7.00 | 0.00 | 3 |
| 9 | Yura Min; Alexander Gamelin | South Korea | 51.97 | 24.88 | 27.09 | 6.79 | 6.54 | 6.82 | 6.89 | 6.82 | 0.00 | 2 |
| 10 | Adel Tankova; Ronald Zilberberg | Israel | 44.61 | 22.32 | 22.29 | 5.57 | 5.50 | 5.57 | 5.75 | 5.46 | 0.00 | 1 |

=== Women's singles ===
The women's short program was held on 11 February. Evgenia Medvedeva of Russia set a new world record score of 81.06, easily finishing in first place. Her performance included a triple flip-triple toe loop jump combination, a triple Lutz, a double Axel, and highlighted her athleticism and showmanship. Barry Wilner of the Associated Press wrote that Medvedeva "virtually floated along the ice, nailing every element with a combination of technical skill and artistry that only she has perfected in recent years".

Carolina Kostner of Italy, the bronze medalist from the 2014 Winter Olympics, finished in second place, earning praise for her artistry and spins. Kaetlyn Osmond of Canada finished in third place, which was enough to secure Canada's lead at the end of the first half of the team event. Bradie Tennell of the United States set a new season's best score, although she ultimately finished in fifth place. Tennell successfully performed all of her jumps, which included a triple Lutz-triple toe loop jump combination and a triple loop, and earned praise from Tara Lipinski, who had won the gold medal at the 1998 Winter Olympics.

Women's short program results
| Pl. | Skater | Nation | TSS | TES | PCS | SS | TR | PE | CO | IN | DED | Pts. |
|---|---|---|---|---|---|---|---|---|---|---|---|---|
| 1 | Evgenia Medvedeva | (International Olympic Committee) OAR | 81.06 | 42.83 | 38.23 | 9.54 | 9.43 | 9.57 | 9.56 | 9.68 | 0.00 | 10 |
| 2 | Carolina Kostner | Italy | 75.10 | 36.96 | 38.14 | 9.54 | 9.32 | 9.50 | 9.68 | 9.64 | 0.00 | 9 |
| 3 | Kaetlyn Osmond | Canada | 71.33 | 35.10 | 36.28 | 9.11 | 8.89 | 8.96 | 9.18 | 9.21 | 0.00 | 8 |
| 4 | Satoko Miyahara | Japan | 68.95 | 34.33 | 34.62 | 8.71 | 8.39 | 8.71 | 8.68 | 8.79 | 0.00 | 7 |
| 5 | Bradie Tennell | United States | 68.94 | 38.94 | 30.00 | 7.54 | 7.29 | 7.68 | 7.54 | 7.46 | 0.00 | 6 |
| 6 | Choi Da-bin | South Korea | 65.73 | 37.16 | 28.57 | 7.29 | 6.79 | 7.29 | 7.18 | 7.18 | 0.00 | 5 |
| 7 | Li Xiangning | China | 58.62 | 32.65 | 25.97 | 6.61 | 6.14 | 6.64 | 6.46 | 6.61 | 0.00 | 4 |
| 8 | Nicole Schott | Germany | 55.32 | 29.35 | 26.97 | 6.89 | 6.50 | 6.64 | 6.86 | 6.82 | 1.00 | 3 |
| 9 | Maé-Bérénice Méité | France | 46.62 | 22.79 | 24.83 | 6.29 | 6.00 | 6.04 | 6.32 | 6.39 | 1.00 | 2 |
| 10 | Aimee Buchanan | Israel | 46.30 | 25.07 | 21.23 | 5.32 | 4.96 | 5.36 | 5.39 | 5.50 | 0.00 | 1 |

=== Overall ===
Code key

- M-SP – Men's short program
- P-SP – Pairs' short program
- D-SD – Short dance
- W-SP – Women's short program

Upon completion of the women's short program, the top five teams were cleared to move on to the second round of competition. The Canadian team was in the lead with 35 points, followed by the Russian team, the United States, Italy, and Japan. The bottom five teams – China, Germany, Israel, South Korea, and France – were eliminated from the competition.

Team event results after first round
| Pl. | Nation | M-SP | P-SP | D-SD | W-SP | Pts. | Status |
|---|---|---|---|---|---|---|---|
| 1 | Canada | 8 | 9 | 10 | 8 | 35 | Advanced to final round |
| 2 | (International Olympic Committee) OAR | 3 | 10 | 8 | 10 | 31 | Advanced to final round |
| 3 | United States | 7 | 7 | 9 | 6 | 29 | Advanced to final round |
| 4 | Italy | 6 | 4 | 7 | 9 | 26 | Advanced to final round |
| 5 | Japan | 10 | 3 | 6 | 7 | 26 | Advanced to final round |
| 6 | China | 4 | 6 | 4 | 4 | 18 | Did not advance to final round |
| 7 | Germany | 2 | 8 | 3 | 3 | 16 | Did not advance to final round |
| 8 | Israel | 9 | 2 | 1 | 1 | 13 | Did not advance to final round |
| 9 | South Korea | 5 | 1 | 2 | 5 | 13 | Did not advance to final round |
| 10 | France | 1 | 5 | 5 | 2 | 13 | Did not advance to final round |

== Results (final round) ==
Code key

- TSS – Total Segment Score
- TES – Total Elements Score
- PCS – Program Component Score
- SS – Skating skills
- TR – Transitions
- PE – Performance
- CO – Composition
- IN – Musical interpretation/Timing
- DED – Deductions

=== Pairs ===
The pairs' free skate was held on 11 February. Meagan Duhamel and Eric Radford of Canada finished first in the free skate with their performance to "Hometown Glory" by Adele. The ten points they earned from this segment left Canada with a comfortable lead at the end of the second day of competition. Valentina Marchei and Ondřej Hotárek of Italy finished in second place, two spots ahead of Alexa Scimeca-Knierim and Chris Knierim of the United States. At the end of the day, the Russian team was in second place and the American team was in third, just one point ahead of the Italian team.

Pairs' free skate results
| Pl. | Team | Nation | TSS | TES | PCS | SS | TR | PE | CO | IN | DED | Pts. |
|---|---|---|---|---|---|---|---|---|---|---|---|---|
| 1 | Meagan Duhamel; Eric Radford | Canada | 148.51 | 77.26 | 71.25 | 8.96 | 8.79 | 8.96 | 8.93 | 8.89 | 0.00 | 10 |
| 2 | Valentina Marchei; Ondrej Hotarek | Italy | 138.44 | 72.02 | 67.42 | 8.18 | 8.21 | 8.54 | 8.64 | 8.57 | 1.00 | 9 |
| 3 | Natalia Zabiiako; Alexander Enbert | (International Olympic Committee) OAR | 133.28 | 68.06 | 66.22 | 8.39 | 8.07 | 8.18 | 8.39 | 8.36 | 1.00 | 8 |
| 4 | Alexa Scimeca Knierim; Chris Knierim | United States | 126.56 | 64.82 | 62.74 | 7.82 | 7.68 | 7.82 | 7.96 | 7.93 | 1.00 | 7 |
| 5 | Miu Suzaki; Ryuichi Kihara | Japan | 97.67 | 49.24 | 49.43 | 6.39 | 5.93 | 6.04 | 6.29 | 6.25 | 1.00 | 6 |

=== Men's singles ===
The men's free skate was held on 12 February. Patrick Chan of Canada finished in first place, with a season-best score of 179.75. Although he had difficulty with his triple Axel, he successfully performed two quadruple jumps and a number of jump combinations. Mikhail Kolyada of Russia finished in second place, despite falling on his quadruple Lutz, while Adam Rippon of the United States finished in third. This was Rippon's Olympic debut, though he had already generated a fair amount of press leading up, as he was the first openly gay athlete from the United States to be selected for the Winter Olympics. Although Rippon's performance lacked any quadruple jumps, Helene Elliott of the Los Angeles Times believed it highlighted his superb spins and artistry. Both Rippon and Mirai Nagasu had been passed over for the American team sent to the 2014 Winter Olympics, so they used that frustration and disappointment to drive their motivation, intent on being on the 2018 team.

Men's free skate results
| Pl. | Skater | Nation | TSS | TES | PCS | SS | TR | PE | CO | IN | DED | Pts. |
|---|---|---|---|---|---|---|---|---|---|---|---|---|
| 1 | Patrick Chan | Canada | 179.75 | 87.67 | 93.08 | 9.50 | 9.29 | 8.93 | 9.39 | 9.43 | 1.00 | 10 |
| 2 | Mikhail Kolyada | (International Olympic Committee) OAR | 173.57 | 88.35 | 86.22 | 8.82 | 8.43 | 8.61 | 8.57 | 8.68 | 1.00 | 9 |
| 3 | Adam Rippon | United States | 172.98 | 86.20 | 86.78 | 8.61 | 8.39 | 8.82 | 8.75 | 8.85 | 0.00 | 8 |
| 4 | Matteo Rizzo | Italy | 156.11 | 78.77 | 77.34 | 7.64 | 7.39 | 8.18 | 7.71 | 7.75 | 0.00 | 7 |
| 5 | Keiji Tanaka | Japan | 148.36 | 72.02 | 77.34 | 8.00 | 7.57 | 7.50 | 7.96 | 7.64 | 1.00 | 6 |

=== Women's singles ===
The women's free skate was held on 12 February. Alina Zagitova of Russia finished in first place. Her performance was described as stunning, but her program was backloaded, with her jumps in the second half of her routine, so as to maximize the bonus points she could earn. Mirai Nagasu finished in second place with a new personal best score and becoming the first American woman to successfully perform a triple Axel at the Winter Olympics. Nagasu had finished fourth in the women's event at the 2010 Winter Olympics, but like Adam Rippon, she had been left off the American team at the 2014 Winter Olympics. Determined to earn a spot on the team in 2018, she decided that she needed to do something to make herself stand out. Nagasu became the third American woman to perform a triple Axel, after Tonya Harding and Kimmie Meissner, and only two other women – Midori Ito and Mao Asada, both of Japan – had previously been able to successfully perform a triple Axel at the Olympics. Gabrielle Daleman of Canada finished in third place, giving the Canadian team 63 points to the Russians' 58 points.

Women's free skate results
| Pl. | Skater | Nation | TSS | TES | PCS | SS | TR | PE | CO | IN | Pts. |
|---|---|---|---|---|---|---|---|---|---|---|---|
| 1 | Alina Zagitova | (International Olympic Committee) OAR | 158.08 | 83.06 | 75.02 | 9.21 | 9.29 | 9.57 | 9.39 | 9.43 | 10 |
| 2 | Mirai Nagasu | United States | 137.53 | 73.38 | 64.15 | 8.25 | 7.64 | 8.32 | 7.89 | 8.00 | 9 |
| 3 | Gabrielle Daleman | Canada | 137.14 | 68.86 | 68.28 | 8.71 | 8.18 | 8.71 | 8.50 | 8.57 | 8 |
| 4 | Carolina Kostner | Italy | 134.00 | 59.73 | 74.27 | 9.39 | 9.07 | 9.00 | 9.46 | 9.50 | 7 |
| 5 | Kaori Sakamoto | Japan | 131.91 | 65.51 | 66.40 | 8.32 | 8.11 | 8.32 | 8.39 | 8.36 | 6 |

=== Ice dance ===
The free dance was held on 12 February. Tessa Virtue and Scott Moir finished in first place, although Canada's gold-medal win was already decided. With their fourth Olympic medal, Virtue and Moir tied Gillis Grafström of Sweden and Evgeni Plushenko of Russia for winning the most Olympic medals. Virtue and Moir could have given a very mild performance and Canada would have still been guaranteed the gold, but they performed beautifully, finishing in first place and giving the Canadian team a total of 73 points, well ahead of the other teams.

Free dance results
| Pl. | Team | Nation | TSS | TES | PCS | SS | TR | PE | CO | IN | DED | Pts. |
|---|---|---|---|---|---|---|---|---|---|---|---|---|
| 1 | Tessa Virtue; Scott Moir | Canada | 118.10 | 59.25 | 58.85 | 9.61 | 9.61 | 9.93 | 9.93 | 9.96 | 0.00 | 10 |
| 2 | Maia Shibutani; Alex Shibutani | United States | 112.01 | 56.41 | 55.60 | 9.32 | 9.18 | 9.36 | 9.18 | 9.29 | 0.00 | 9 |
| 3 | Ekaterina Bobrova; Dmitri Soloviev | (International Olympic Committee) OAR | 110.43 | 54.72 | 55.71 | 9.21 | 9.11 | 9.36 | 9.36 | 9.39 | 0.00 | 8 |
| 4 | Anna Cappellini; Luca Lanotte | Italy | 107.00 | 52.70 | 54.30 | 8.96 | 8.79 | 9.07 | 9.14 | 9.29 | 0.00 | 7 |
| 5 | Kana Muramoto; Chris Reed | Japan | 87.88 | 44.69 | 44.19 | 7.32 | 7.29 | 7.14 | 7.68 | 7.39 | 1.00 | 6 |

=== Overall ===
Code key

- M-SP – Men's short program
- P-SP – Pairs short program
- D-SD – Short dance
- W-SP – Women's short program
- P-FS – Pairs free skate
- M-FS – Men's free skate
- W-FS – Women's free skate
- D-FD – Free dance

Patrick Chan, Tessa Virtue and Scott Moir, and Meagan Duhamel and Eric Radford had all announced that they would retire at the end of the season. For Chan, Virtue, and Moir, they had retired after the 2014 Olympics, but come out of retirement expressly to compete at the 2018 Olympics. Afterward, Duhamel spoke about feeling unsatisfied with the team's silver-medal finish in 2014. She and Radford met with Michael Slipchuk, who was at that point the high-performance director for Skate Canada, and they developed a plan to put together the best team possible to compete in the team event. That meant Duhamel and Radford competed in both segments of the pairs' event, Patrick Chan competed in both segments of the men's event, and Tessa Virtue and Scott Moir competed in both segments of the ice dance event, even knowing that they also had two segments each shortly afterward in the individual events. Duhamel explained: "You come to the Olympics in the best shape of your life, mentally, physically, and emotionally. You're on top of your game, and when you're given the opportunity to compete at the Olympics, you compete as much as possible, because it won't happen again".

Team event results after second round
| Pl. | Nation | M-SP | P-SP | D-SD | W-SP | P-FS | M-FS | W-FS | D-FD | Pts. |
|---|---|---|---|---|---|---|---|---|---|---|
| 1st place, gold medalist(s) | Canada | 8 | 9 | 10 | 8 | 10 | 10 | 8 | 10 | 73 |
| 2nd place, silver medalist(s) | (International Olympic Committee) OAR | 3 | 10 | 8 | 10 | 8 | 9 | 10 | 8 | 66 |
| 3rd place, bronze medalist(s) | United States | 7 | 7 | 9 | 6 | 7 | 8 | 9 | 9 | 62 |
| 4 | Italy | 6 | 4 | 7 | 9 | 9 | 7 | 7 | 7 | 56 |
| 5 | Japan | 10 | 3 | 6 | 7 | 6 | 6 | 6 | 6 | 50 |

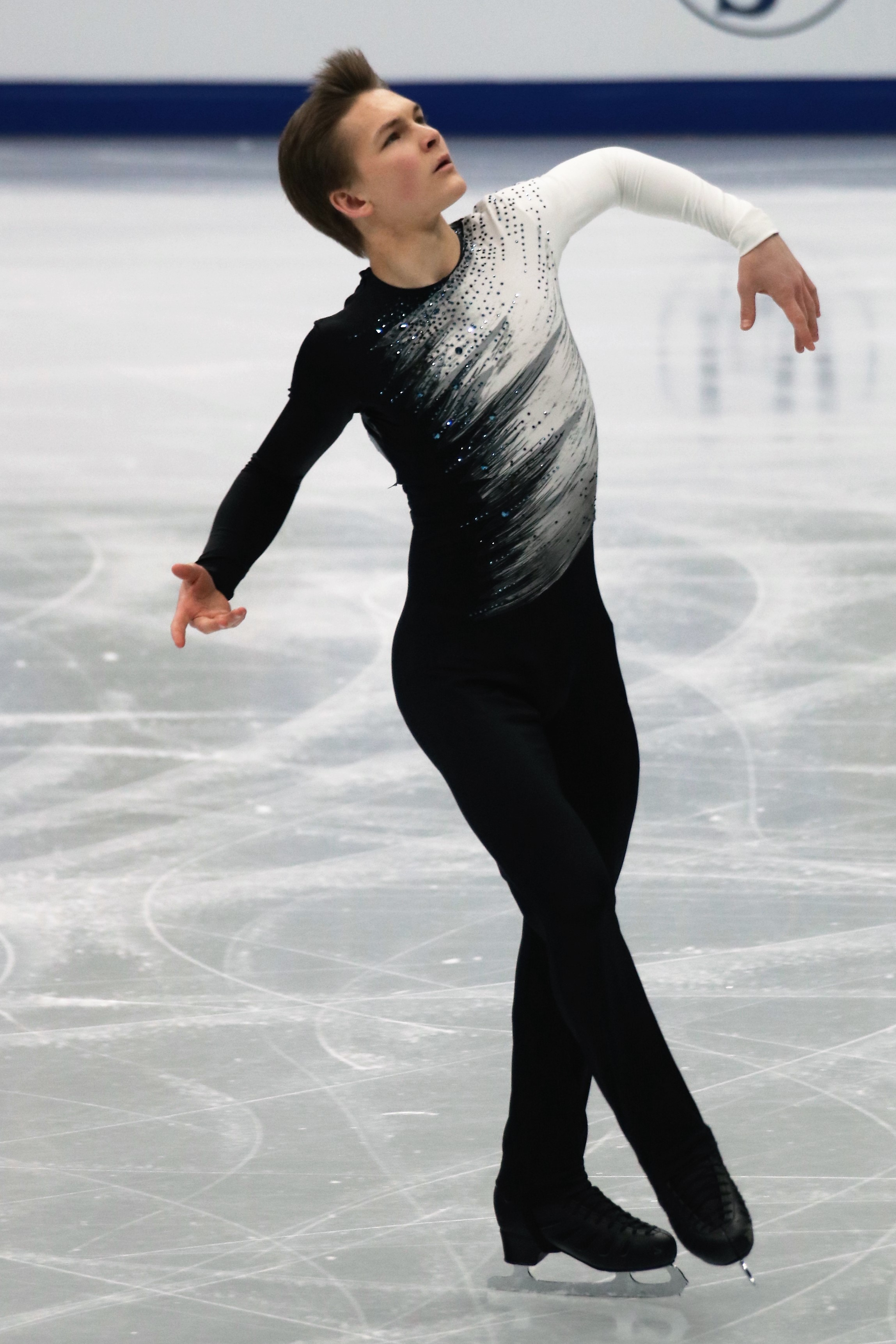
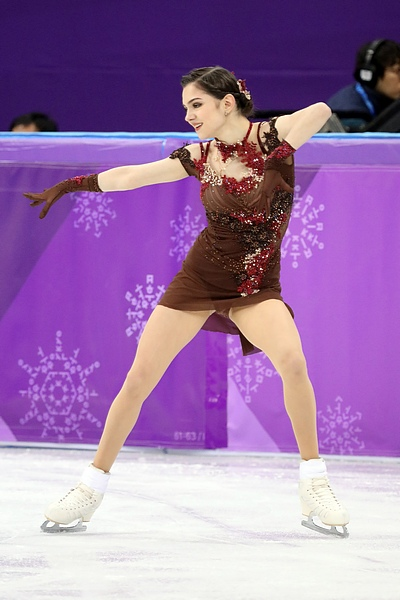
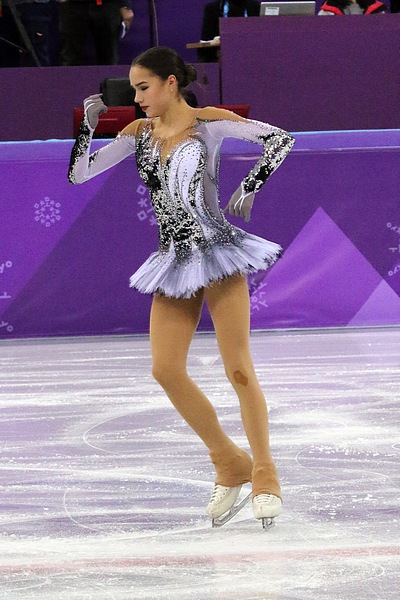
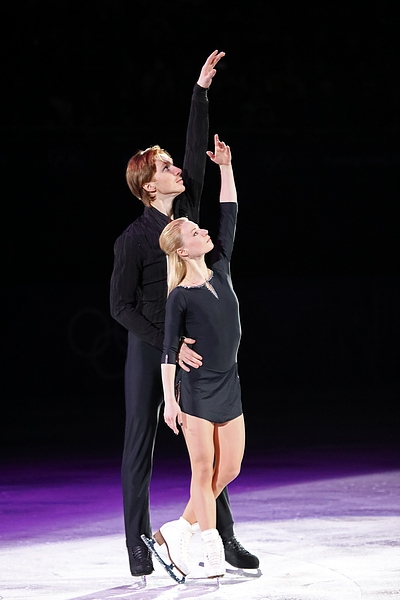
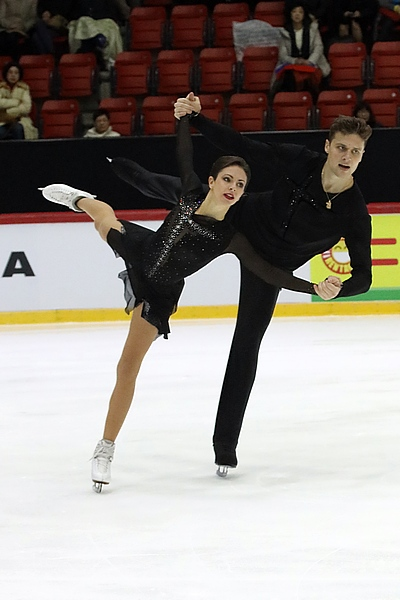
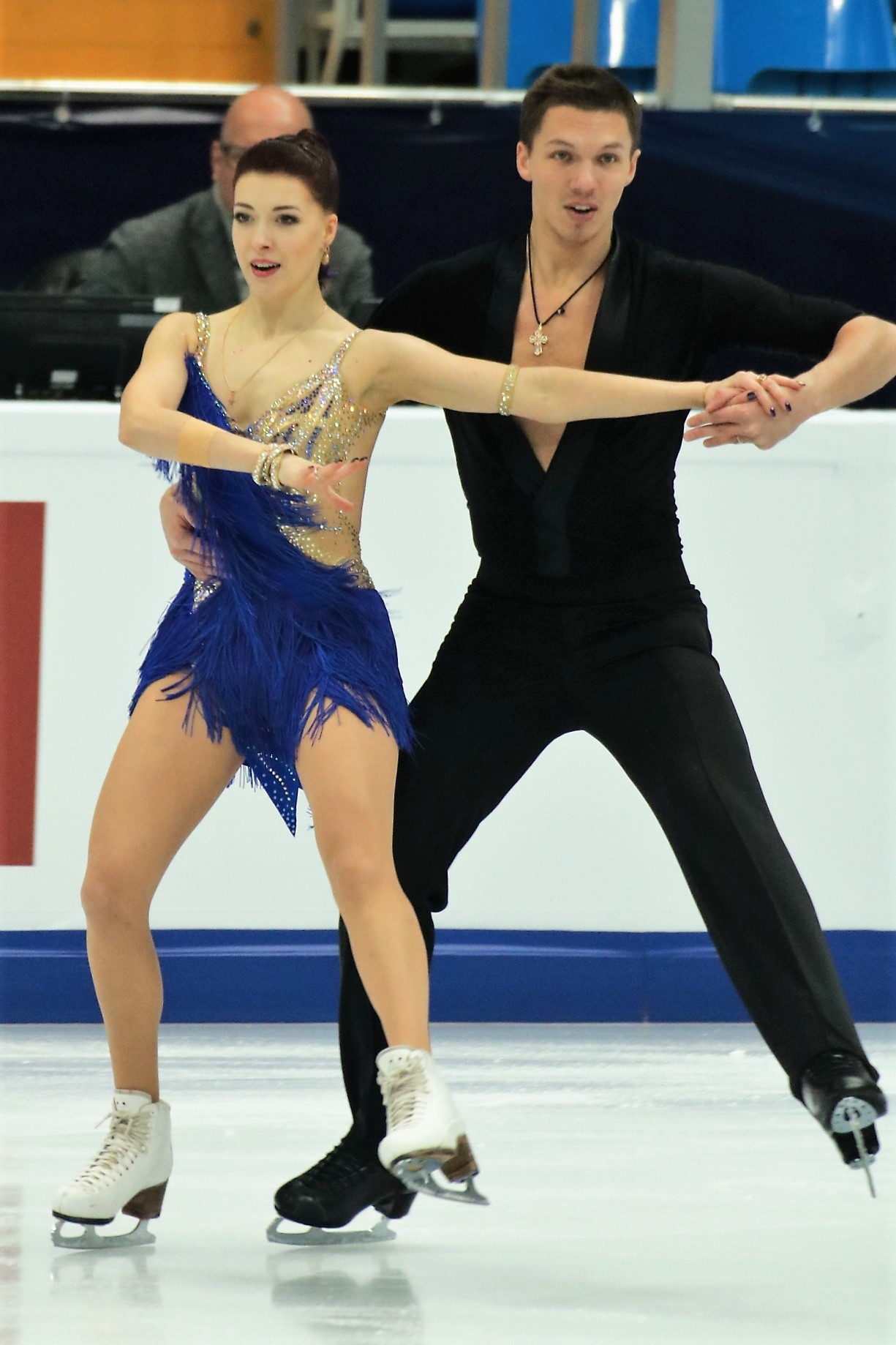
The Russian figure skating team and silver medalists from the 2018 Winter Olympics (from left to right):
Mikhail Kolyada; Evgenia Medvedeva; Alina Zagitova; Evgenia Tarasova and Vladimir Morozov; Natalia Zabiiako and Alexander Enbert; and Ekaterina Bobrova and Dmitri Soloviev
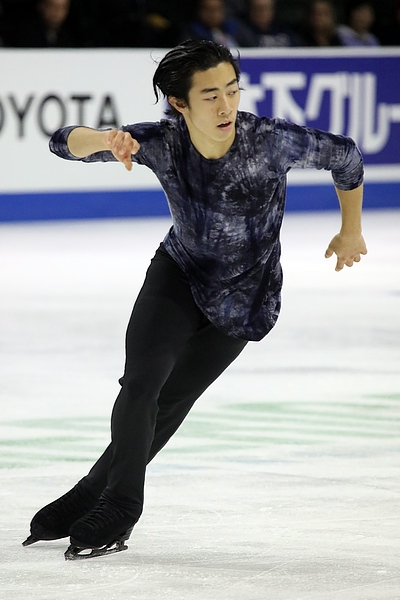
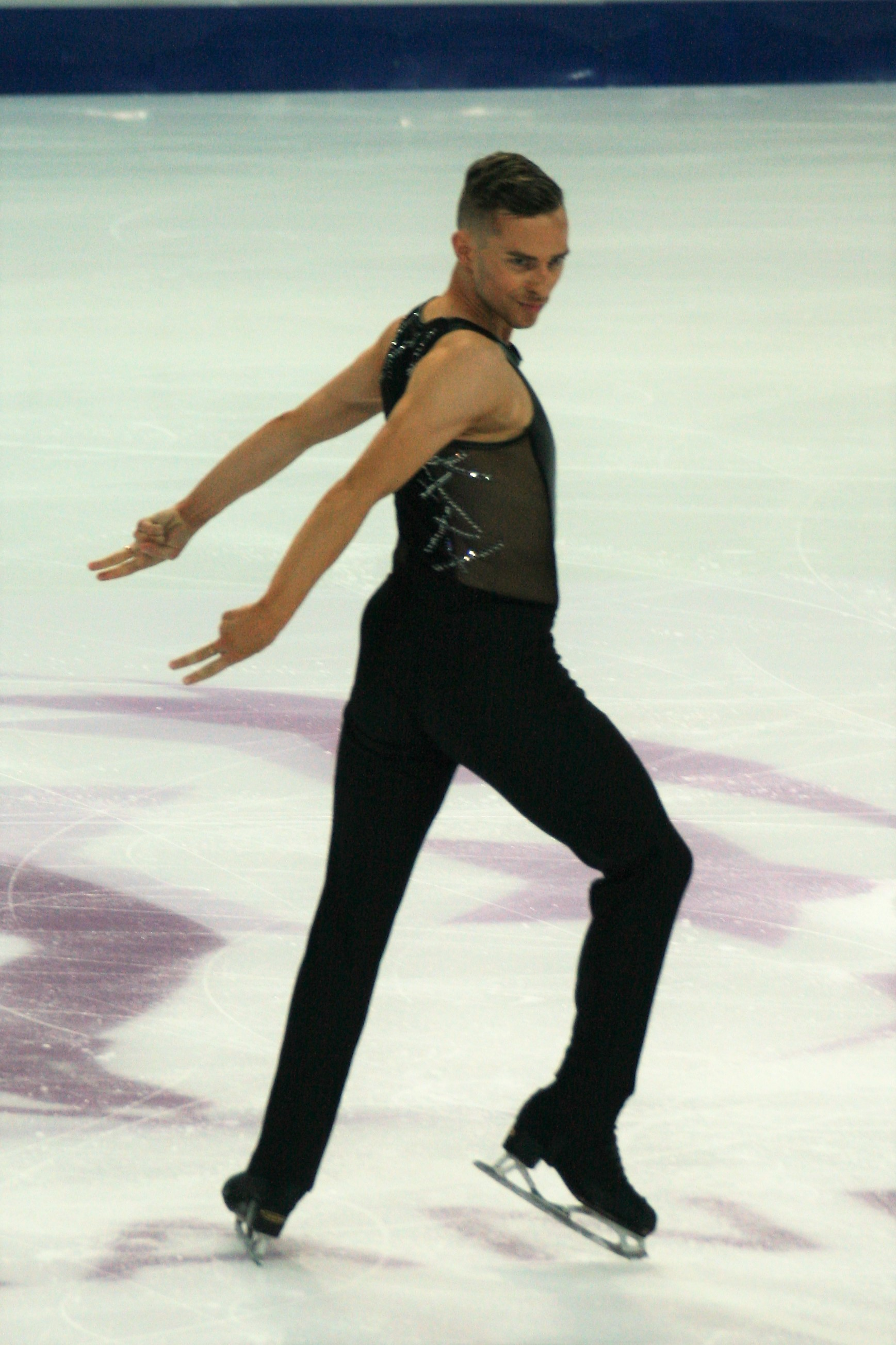
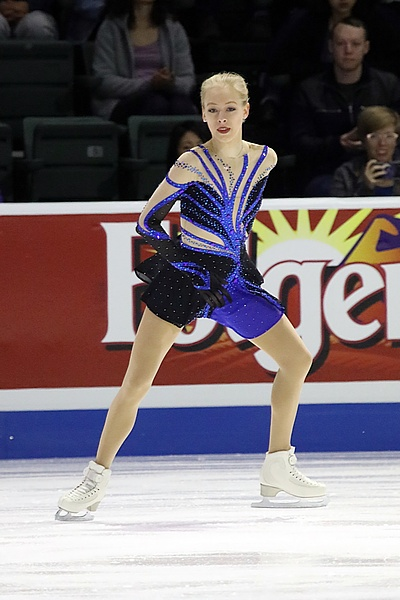
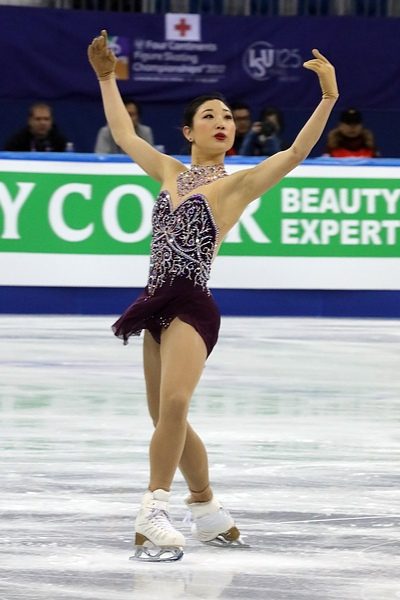
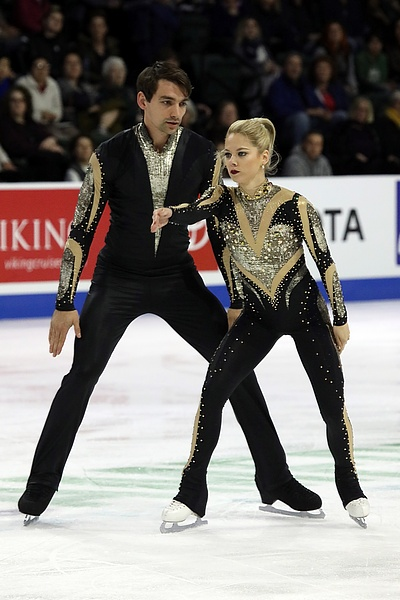
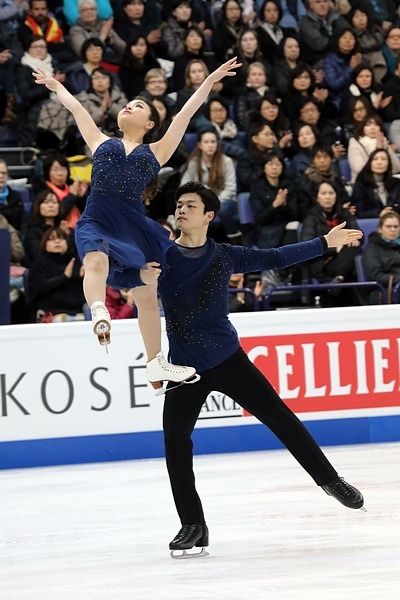
The U.S. figure skating team and bronze medalists from the 2018 Winter Olympics (from left to right):
Nathan Chen; Adam Rippon; Bradie Tennell; Mirai Nagasu; Alexa Scimeca Knierim and Chris Knierim; and Maia Shibutani and Alex Shibutani

== Records ==
The following new record high score was set during this competition.

Record high scores
| Date | Skater(s) | Segment | Score | Ref. |
|---|---|---|---|---|
| 11 February | Evgenia Medvedeva (OAR) | Women's short program | 81.06 | |

== Aftermath ==
Alina Zagitova of Russia received criticism for backloading her free skate – that is, waiting until the second half of her program to perform her jumps, because jumps performed in the second half of a program received bonus points. Christine Brennan, a sports reporter for USA Today, speculated that the International Skating Union would probably change their rules to prevent future skaters from doing what Zagitova did. At the 57th meeting of the ISU Congress in 2018, the ISU limited the number of jump elements that a skater could execute for a bonus in the back half of a performance to one in the short program and three in the free skate. This has colloquially been referred to as the "Zagitova rule".

== Works cited ==
- "Special Regulations & Technical Rules – Single & Pair Skating and Ice Dance 2016". International Skating Union. p. 24. Archived from the original on 4 January 2018.
