= Ronald Zilberberg =

Israeli Olympic figure skater (born 1996)

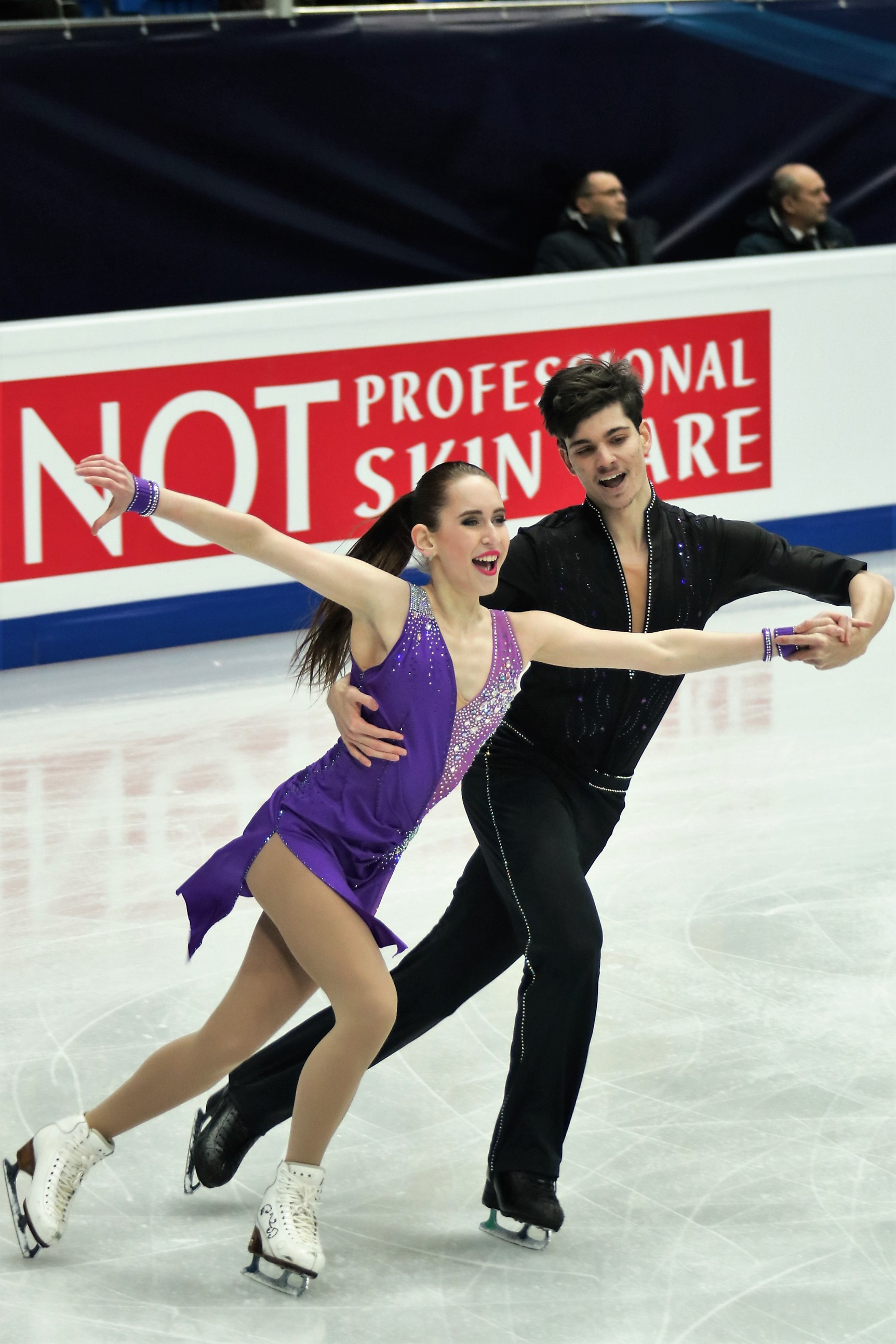

Personal information
- Native name: רונלד זילברברג
- Nickname: Rony
- Nationality: Israeli
- Born: 4 April 1996 (age 29) Kiryat Shmona, Israel
- Height: 1.80 m (5 ft 11 in)

Sport
- Country: Israel
- Sport: Figure skating
- Partner: Elizabeth Bernardini
- Former partner(s): Adel Tankova; Kimberly Berkovich; Anna Bolshem
- Coached by: Galit Chait Moracci

Ronald Zilberberg (Hebrew: רונלד זילברברג; born 4 April 1996) is an Israeli Olympic figure skater. He competed for Israel at the 2018 Winter Olympics with Adel Tankova in Figure Skating in ice dancing and a team event in Pyeongchang, South Korea.

== Early and personal life ==
Zilberberg was born in Kiryat Shmona, Israel, and is Jewish. He lives in Hackensack, New Jersey. His nickname is Roni.

== Skating career ==
Zilberberg started skating in 2005. His club is Israel ISF. His former partners were Kimberly Berkovich and Anna Bolshem. He is coached by Galit Chait Moracci.

In 2017/2018, he and Adel Tankova won the Israeli National Championship, and came in 28th in the ISU European Ice Dance Championship.

Zilberberg and Tankova competed for Israel at the 2018 Winter Olympics in Figure Skating in ice dancing and a team event in Pyeongchang, South Korea. They scored 46.66 for the short dance event for an overall finish of 24th place.
