= Matteo Rizzo =

Italian figure skater (born 1998)

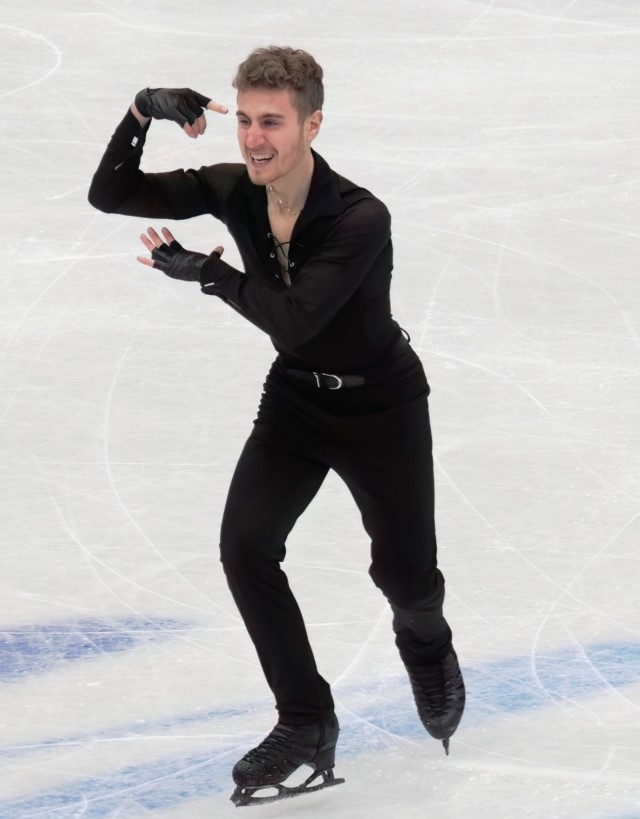
- Rizzo at the 2022 World Championships

Personal information
- Born: 5 September 1998 (age 28) Rome, Italy
- Home town: Sesto San Giovanni, Italy
- Height: 1.71 m (5 ft 7 in)

Figure skating career
- Country: Italy
- Discipline: Men's singles
- Coach: Ondrej Hotarek; Valter Rizzo; Deborah Sacchi
- Skating club: G.S. Fiamme Azzurre
- Began skating: 2006
- Highest WS: 7th (2020–21)

Medal record
| Event | Gold medal – first place | Silver medal – second place | Bronze medal – third place |
| Olympic Games | 0 | 0 | 1 |
| European Championships | 0 | 2 | 2 |
| Italian Championships | 2 | 8 | 0 |
| World Junior Championships | 0 | 0 | 1 |
Medal list
Olympic Games
| Bronze medal – third place | 2026 Milano Cortina | Team |
European Championships
| Silver medal – second place | 2023 Espoo | Singles |
| Silver medal – second place | 2026 Sheffield | Singles |
| Bronze medal – third place | 2019 Minsk | Singles |
| Bronze medal – third place | 2024 Kaunas | Singles |
Italian Championships
| Gold medal – first place | 2018 Milan | Singles |
| Gold medal – first place | 2023 Brunico | Singles |
| Silver medal – second place | 2015 Turin | Singles |
| Silver medal – second place | 2016 Turin | Singles |
| Silver medal – second place | 2017 Egna | Singles |
| Silver medal – second place | 2019 Trento | Singles |
| Silver medal – second place | 2020 Bergamo | Singles |
| Silver medal – second place | 2021 Egna | Singles |
| Silver medal – second place | 2022 Turin | Singles |
| Silver medal – second place | 2026 Begamo | Singles |
World Junior Championships
| Bronze medal – third place | 2018 Sofia | Singles |

Matteo Rizzo (born 5 September 1998) is an Italian figure skater. He is a 2026 Olympic Games Team Event bronze medalist, four-time European Championship medalist (silver in 2023 and 2026, bronze in 2019 and 2024), a four-time Grand Prix bronze medalist, the 2019 Winter Universiade champion, a two-time Italian national champion (2018 and 2023), and an eight-time silver national medalist (2015–17, 2019–22, 2026). He has won thirteen ISU Challenger Series medals, including gold at the 2017 CS Warsaw Cup and 2022 CS Budapest Trophy.

Rizzo represented Italy at the 2018, 2022, and 2026 Winter Olympics.

On the junior level, he is also the 2018 World Junior bronze medalist, the 2017 JGP Italy champion, and the 2014 Italian junior national champion.

== Personal life ==
Rizzo was born on 5 September 1998 in Rome, Italy. His parents, Brunilde Bianchi and Valter Rizzo, and sister, Francesca Rizzo, all competed in ice dance. He previously attended Vita-Salute San Raffaele University.

In addition to being a figure skater, he is also a police officer.

== Career ==
=== Early years ===
Rizzo began learning to skate in 2006. He competed internationally on the novice level in the 2010–2011 and 2011–2012 seasons, winning silver at the Triglav Trophy in April 2012. His junior international debut came in September 2012 at the Ice Star event in Belarus.

=== 2013–2014 season: Junior national title ===
Rizzo debuted on the ISU Junior Grand Prix (JGP) series in September 2013, placing eleventh at an event in Slovakia, and won the Italian national junior title in December. In January–February 2014, making his senior international debut, he finished ninth at the Bavarian Open and fifth at the Dragon Trophy before taking the silver medal at the Hellmut Seibt Memorial. He competed at the 2014 World Junior Championships in Sofia, Bulgaria, but was eliminated after placing thirtieth in the short program.

=== 2014–2015 season ===
Rizzo placed fifteenth at his sole JGP assignment in Germany. Competing on the senior level from November to December, he won silver at the Merano Cup, bronze at the Warsaw Cup – his ISU Challenger Series (CS) debut – gold at the Denkova-Staviski Cup, and silver at the Italian Championships. In January 2015, he placed fourth in Austria at the 2015 European Youth Olympic Winter Festival. His final event of the season was the 2015 World Junior Championships, held in March 2015 in Tallinn, Estonia. Rizzo qualified for the free skate by placing 20th in the short program and finished 22nd overall.

=== 2015–2016 season ===
Rizzo continued on the JGP series, placing fifth at his assignments in Austria and Spain. He earned a bronze medal at the 2015 CS Denkova-Staviski Cup and finished fifth at the 2015 CS Warsaw Cup. He reached the free skate at two ISU Championships – the 2016 Europeans in Bratislava, and the 2016 Junior Worlds in Debrecen, Hungary. He placed thirteenth at both events.

=== 2016–2017 season ===
Rizzo competed at JGP events in Germany and Spain, finishing twelfth and eighth, respectively. He placed eleventh at the 2017 World Junior Championships in Taipei and thirtieth at the 2017 World Championships in Helsinki.

=== 2017–2018 season: First senior national title, Pyeongchang Olympics, World Junior bronze ===
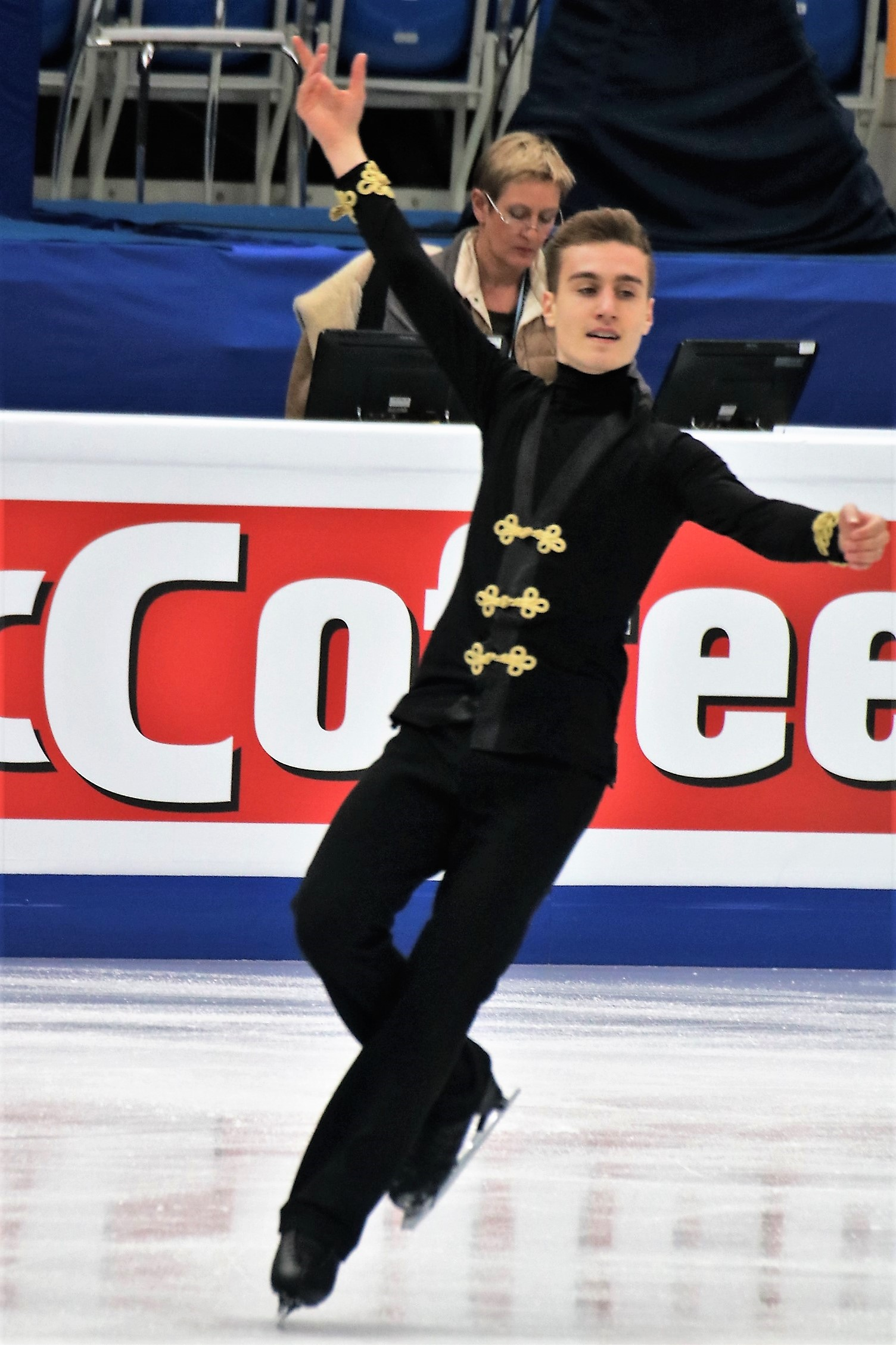
Paganini at the 2018 European Championships

Rizzo began his season in September at two senior-level competitions. After placing fifth at the 2017 CS Lombardia Trophy with a new free skate personal best, he finished fourth at the 2017 CS Nebelhorn Trophy, qualifying Italy for a spot in the men's discipline at the 2018 Winter Olympics.

In October, Rizzo competed at two JGP events. He placed second in the short program at the JGP Poland in Gdańsk, but his placement in the free skate (tenth) dropped him to sixth overall. Ranked second in the short and first in the free, he won the gold medal at JGP Italy in Egna, setting new personal bests for the short program as well as his overall score.

Returning to the senior level, Rizzo won gold at the 2017 CS Warsaw Cup, having placed first in both segments ahead of Switzerland's Stéphane Walker and Canada's Liam Firus. In December, he won the national title and was selected to represent Italy at the 2018 Winter Olympics in South Korea. Rizzo competed in both parts of the team event as part of the Italian team, placing fifth in the short program and fourth in the free skate, while Team Italy finished fourth overall. He finished twenty-first in the men's event.

Returning to the junior level one final time, Rizzo competed at the 2018 World Junior Championships and won the bronze medal after placing sixth in both programs. This was the first World Junior medal for an Italian man. At the 2018 World Championships in Milan, Rizzo placed seventeenth.

=== 2018–2019 season: First Grand Prix medal and European bronze ===
Beginning the season at the 2018 CS Lombardia Trophy, Rizzo ranked fourth in the short program with a personal best score of 85.51 and fourth in the free skate, finishing fourth overall. He then competed at the 2018 CS Finlandia Trophy, where he finished sixth. In his Grand Prix debut event, he placed fourth at 2018 Skate America and third at 2018 NHK Trophy. Rizzo's bronze medal at the NHK Trophy was the first Grand Prix medal for an Italian male skater. In December, he took gold at the 2018 Denkova-Staviski Cup and the silver medal at the 2019 Italian Championships.

Competing at the 2019 European Championships, Rizzo debuted a new free skate to a medley of Queen songs. He placed tenth in the short program and third in the free skate, winning the bronze medal overall with a personal best score of 247.08 points and achieving his first podium finish at a senior-level ISU Championship. In his free skate, he successfully landed a quad toe loop for the first time. Rizzo was the first Italian man to win a European medal since Samuel Contesti in 2009.

Rizzo next participated in the 2019 Winter Universiade in Krasnoyarsk, Russia. Introducing the quad toe loop into the short program, he finished second there and then placed first in the free skate to win the gold medal. At the World Championships in Japan, Rizzo placed fifth in the short program with a new personal best score, tenth in the free, and seventh overall. He concluded the season as part of Team Italy at the 2019 World Team Trophy, where he placed fourth among the men competing and Team Italy finished sixth overall.

=== 2019–2020 season: Second Grand Prix medal ===
In the summer, Rizzo trained at the Toronto Cricket, Skating & Curling Club under Brian Orser, working to acquire more quadruple jumps for the coming season. Rizzo began the season with two Challengers, winning bronze at the 2019 CS Lombardia Trophy and silver at the 2019 CS Ondrej Nepela Memorial. He attempted the quad loop in competition for the first time.

For his first Grand Prix assignment, Rizzo competed at the 2019 Skate Canada International. In the short program, he placed eighth after underrotating his quadruple toe loop and falling on his combination jump. Despite a number of errors in the free skate, he moved up to finish in sixth place overall. At the 2019 Cup of China, Rizzo placed third in the short program despite falling on his triple Lutz and consequently missing his combination. Fourth in the free skate, he remained in third place overall and won the bronze medal.

After winning the silver medal at the Italian Championships, Rizzo competed at the 2020 European Championships, where he placed seventh in the short program after some minor jump errors. Fifth in the free skate, he rose to fifth place overall but remarked that it had been "a tough season for me because it’s between the Olympics." Rizzo was also assigned to compete at the 2020 World Championships, but these were cancelled as a result of the coronavirus pandemic.

=== 2020–2021 season ===
With pandemic-related travel restrictions in place, Rizzo made his season debut at the 2020 CS Nebelhorn Trophy, an event attended by only skaters training in Europe. Third after the short program, he was seventh in the free skate and ended up fifth overall. Following the competition, he announced that he was parting ways with longtime coach Franca Bianconi. On 20 October, Rizzo announced on Instagram that he had relocated his training base to Egna, Italy, to train under coach Lorenzo Magri. He was assigned to compete at the 2020 Internationaux de France, but this event was cancelled due to the pandemic.

After taking the silver medal at the Italian championships, Rizzo was assigned to compete at the 2021 World Championships in Stockholm, where he placed eleventh. Rizzo and Grassl's placements qualified two berths for Italian men at the 2022 Winter Olympics in Beijing. They were both subsequently named to the Italian team for the 2021 World Team Trophy. He announced on April 11 that he had been unable to leave Italy for the event location in Osaka, and therefore withdrew from participation. He subsequently stated that he had withdrawn after a positive COVID-19 test.

=== 2021–2022 season: Beijing Olympics ===
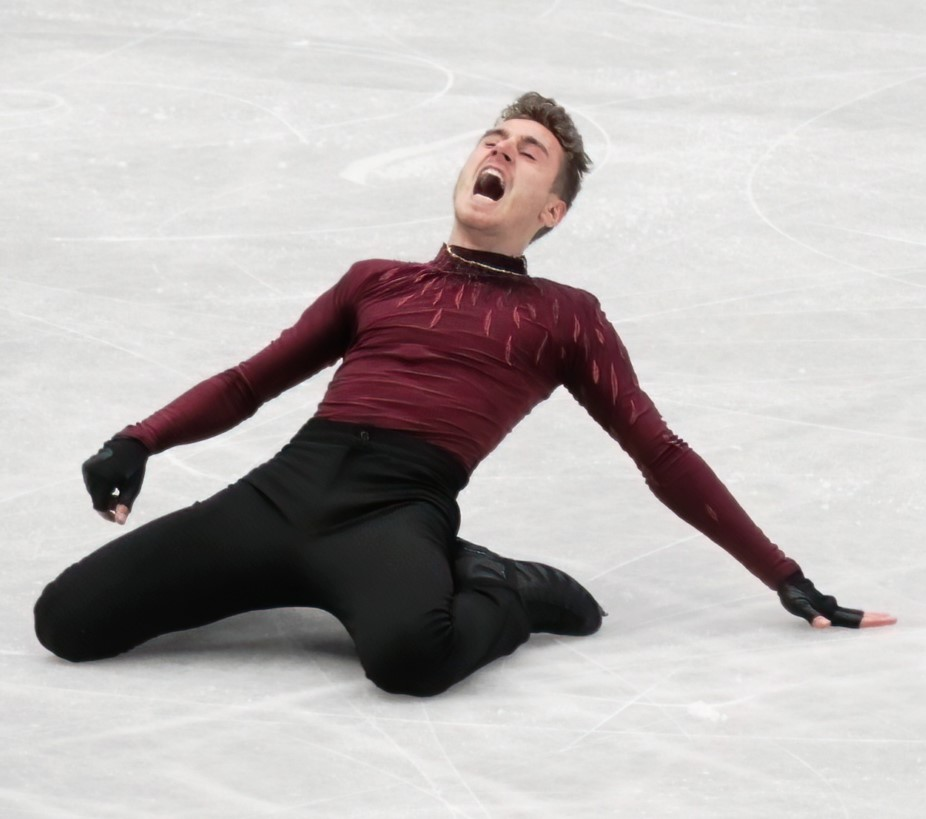
Rizzo performing his signature "knee slide" during the free skate at the 2022 World Championships

Rizzo returned to his former coach Franca Bianconi and also added retired pairs skater Ondřej Hotárek to his team. He made his season debut at the 2021 CS Finlandia Trophy, where he overcame a poor short program to win the free skate and place sixth overall. The following weekend he won the 2021 Budapest Trophy.

On the Grand Prix, Rizzo's first assignment was the 2021 NHK Trophy, where he placed sixth in the short program. He was third in the free skate, rising to fifth place overall despite popping one of his two planned quad jumps. Rizzo expressed satisfaction at receiving a score over 170 points in the free segment with only one quad jump. At the 2021 Rostelecom Cup, he was ninth in the short program and rose to fifth place again after a second-place free skate.

After winning a fourth consecutive silver medal at the Italian championships, Rizzo was named to the Italian Olympic team. He was first forced to withdraw from the 2022 European Championships due to equipment issues. Competing in Beijing, Rizzo placed thirteenth in the short program of the Olympic men's event. Seventeenth in the free skate, he finished sixteenth overall.

Rizzo concluded his season at the 2022 World Championships. He finished tenth overall.

=== 2022–2023 season: Second national title and European silver ===
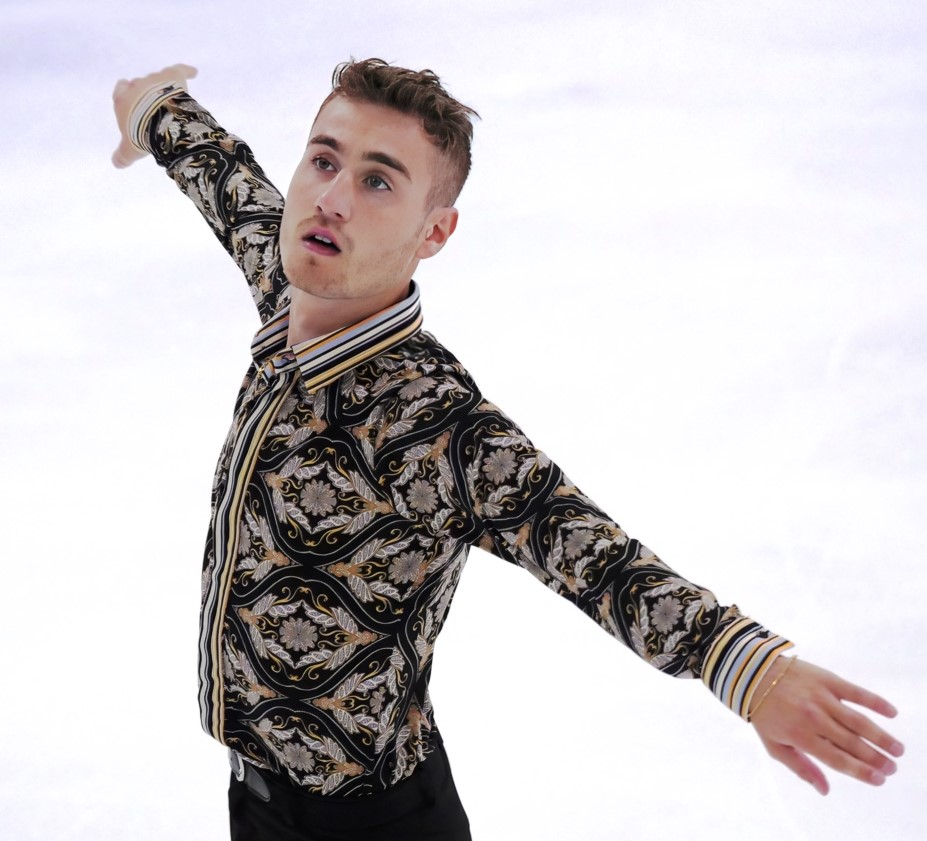
Rizzo during his free skate at the 2022 CS Lombardia Trophy

Rizzo began the season on the Challenger circuit, placing fourth at the 2022 CS Lombardia Trophy before winning the 2022 CS Budapest Trophy. On the Grand Prix, he placed third in the short program at the 2022 Skate Canada International. He was fourth in the free skate but narrowly held onto third overall and won the bronze medal. Rizzo successfully landed a quad loop in his free skate and said that the result "means a lot." He said he hoped to perform a three-quad free skate later in the season. Rizzo went on to finish sixth at the 2022 NHK Trophy.

After winning his second national title, Rizzo competed at the 2023 European Championships, finishing second in the short program, despite underrotating his attempted quad loop. Rizzo said the experience was difficult, as for him the short program was "always like a big wall that I need to crush." In the free skate, he made an error on his opening quad toe loop attempt, but went on to land the quad loop and six triple jumps cleanly, winning a small gold medal for the free skate. He remained in second place overall, winning the silver medal. He reflected that "there were mistakes, but overall I was happy." He was the second Italian man to win multiple European medals, after Carlo Fassi.

Rizzo finished ninth at the 2023 World Championships. He then joined Team Italy for the 2023 World Team Trophy, finishing eighth in the short program despite only performing a quad-double combination and underrotating his attempted quad loop. In the free skate, he scored a new personal best of 187.35, with his only error being a turning out of a triple Axel. He finished second in the free skate, only fractions of a point behind Korea's Cha Jun-hwan. Team Italy finished in fourth place.

=== 2023–2024 season: European bronze ===
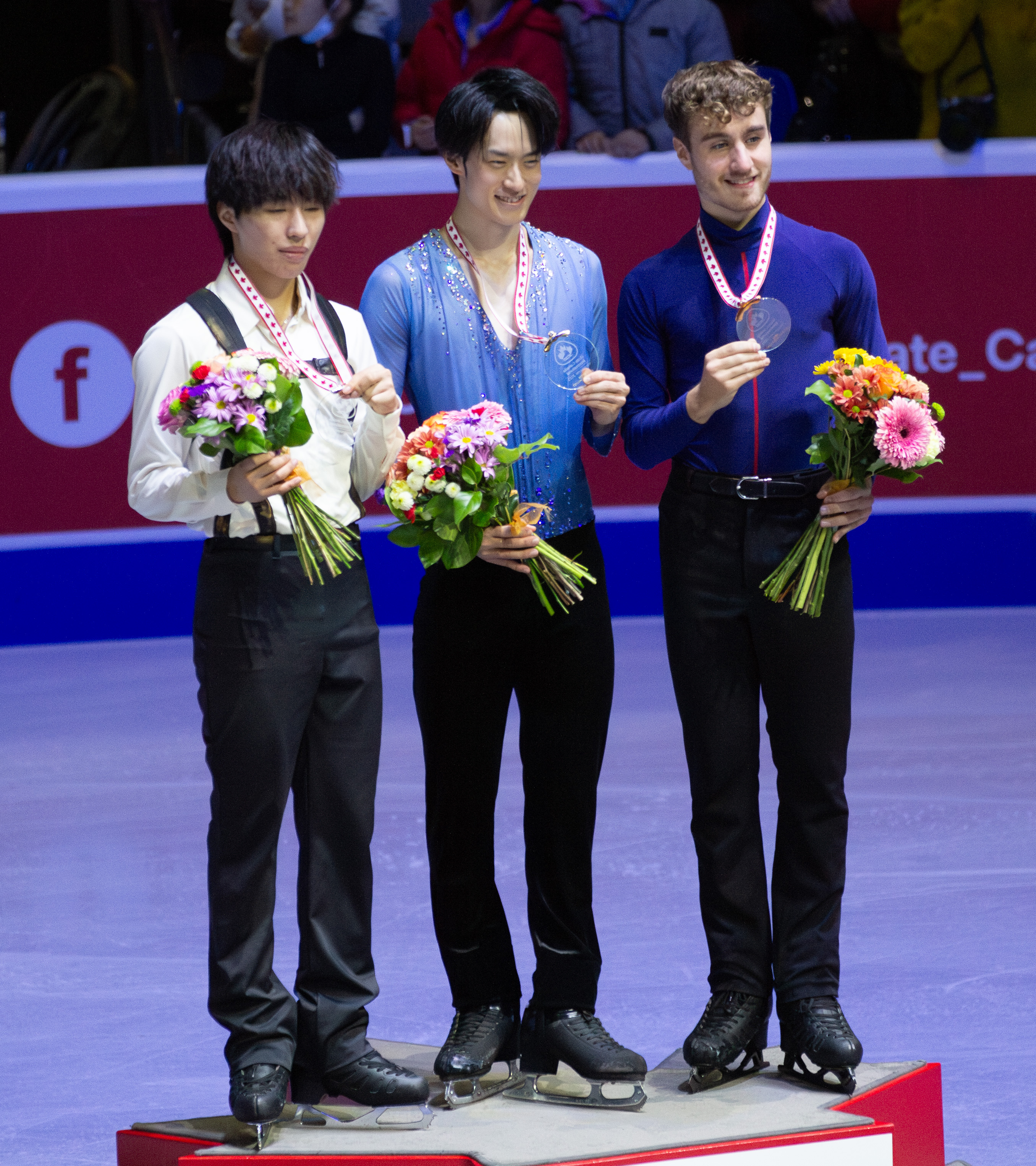
Rizzo (right) during the medal ceremony at 2024 Skate Canada International

Rizzo withdrew from the 2023 CS Lombardia Trophy, opting instead to begin the season at the Shanghai Trophy, where he came fourth. Appearing on the Grand Prix at the 2023 Skate Canada International, he finished seventh in the short program after underrotating both of his attempted quad jumps. In the free skate, he performed cleanly but for a triple Axel stepout, finishing second in the segment and rising to third place overall. He went on to place fourth at the 2023 Grand Prix of Espoo, and expressed frustration at his free skate choreographic sequence being deemed invalid.

After withdrawing from both the 2023 CS Golden Spin of Zagreb and the Italian Championships, Rizzo announced that he required hip surgery that would cause him to miss the 2024 World Championships in Montreal, Quebec, Canada, but that he would compete at the 2024 European Championships in Kaunas, Lithuania. Prior to those championships, Rizzo opted to change his short program from "Dernière danse" to "Two Men in Love," a shortened version of the free program he used for the 2022 Winter Olympics. In Kaunas, he placed sixth in the short program after doubling a planned quad. A second-place free skate with only one mistake, a fall on a triple Axel, lifted him to third overall, and he claimed his third European medal.

Rizzo's surgery was performed in late January.

=== 2024–2025 season: Return to competition post-surgery ===
Rizzo competed at his first competition post-surgery at the 2024 Budapest Trophy in early October, where he won the gold medal. He then went on to compete on the 2024–25 Grand Prix series, finishing fifth at the 2024 NHK Trophy and at the 2024 Cup of China.

On February 1, 2025, Rizzo placed fourth in the short program with a new season's best of 85.68 points at 2025 Europeans. After the short program, he said: "I also want to express my deep condolences to everyone involved in the plane crash and to U.S. Figure Skating. It’s incredibly horrible news. I’ve been following the updates all day, and my heart breaks for my friends in the U.S. I want to send them all my best wishes.” He placed sixth in the free skate and fifth overall. “Honestly, I feel pretty proud of what I’ve done,” said Rizzo after the free skate. “This season has definitely been a roller coaster with a lot of ups and downs. Not everything went to plan today. There were some mistakes, but overall, a top-five finish after last year is something I’m really proud of, and I feel good about it.”

=== 2025–2026 season: Milano Cortina Olympic team event bronze and European silver ===
Rizzo opened the season by competing 2025–26 Challenger Series, finishing eleventh at the 2025 CS Lombardia Trophy and winning silver at both 2025 CS Nepela Memorial. He then won the gold medal at the 2025 Swiss Open.

He placed seventh at both his assigned Grand Prix events, the 2025 NHK Trophy and 2025 Finlandia Trophy. A couple days following the latter event, Rizzo went on to win silver at the 2025 CS Tallinn Trophy.

In December, Rizzo won the silver medal at the 2026 Italian Championships behind Daniel Grassl. The following month, he won the silver medal at the 2026 European Championships behind Nika Egadze. "Obviously I’m happy about everything,” said the 27-year-old after the free skate. “Of course, you always want more, and I know I haven’t skated my best today." The Italian Ice Sports Federation used this event to determine who, between Rizzo and Nikolaj Memola, would be awarded the second men's spot for the 2026 Winter Olympics. Following Rizzo's result, he was ultimately given that Olympic spot.

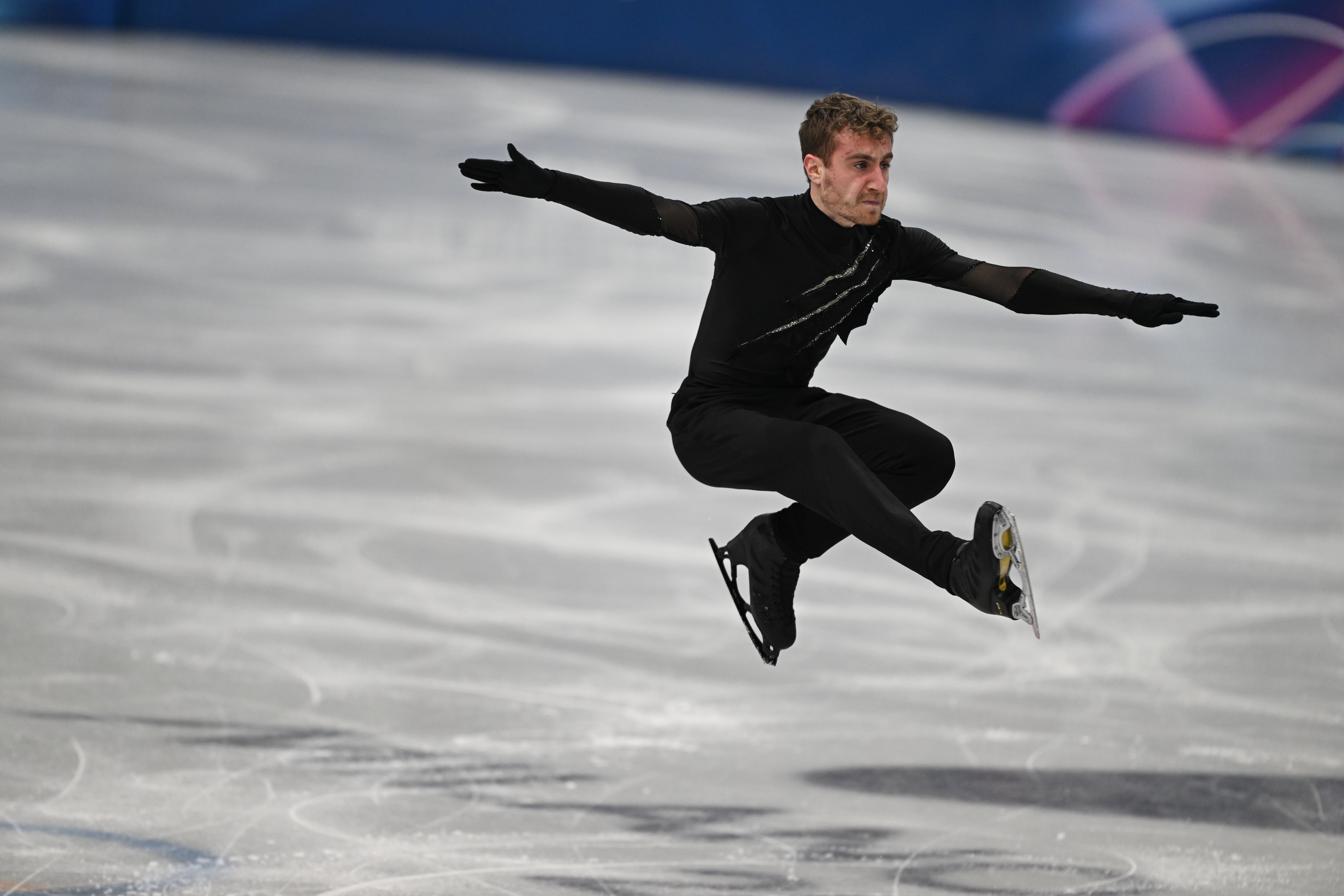
Matteo at the 2026 Winter Olympics

On 8 February 2026, Rizzo competed in the free skate segment of the 2026 Winter Olympic Figure Skating Team Event. Rizzo's performance was meant to determine which team would win the Olympic team bronze medal between Team Italy and Team Georgia. Rizzo skated a flawless free skate, placing third in that segment and helping Team Italy secure that bronze medal. Rizzo and Team Italy's excited reactions following his performance was considered by many to be a standout moment of the 2026 Winter Olympic Games. "I think I will realize this only in a couple of weeks," Rizzo said after being rewarded his medal. "Yeah, but for now, I keep just touching it to feel that it's real. It's out of this world."

On 10 February, Rizzo competed in the short program segment of the Olympic men's singles event, placing sixteenth in that segment. "It was like a rollercoaster," he said following his performance. "I had to finish the team event for our competition, and I did it in the best way possible. I think with a lot of emotions and then the medal. Then I realized that I had 45 hours to compete from point zero, at the Olympics! So it was a challenge for me and my physiotherapists yesterday to let my body recover. I'm 27, I'm not 20 anymore, so I usually need more time. But I was actually feeling good on the ice today... Overall, I think the performance was great, the audience was great. I was not skating full out because I really need to save energy for the free program next, but the crowd was out of this world. I really enjoyed it a lot." Two days later, Rizzo competed in the free skate segment, where he placed fourteenth in the free skate to finish fifteenth overall. "It's hard for me to explain," he said when asked about how he felt about his performance. "I think maybe I lost my focus a little bit in the short program, and I made that [same] mistake again [with the quad toe loop]... I made those awkward mistakes in the spin as well, and I've never had that problem before. I have to work more on this spin. But I'm really happy with the beginning of the program, two quads, two triple axels. I still have some time to work before Worlds."

In early March, it was announced that Rizzo had withdrawn from the 2026 World Championships.

== Programs ==
| Season | Short program | Free skate | Exhibition | Ref. |
|---|---|---|---|---|
| 2025–2026 | Silverlines (Orchestral Version) by Damiano David choreo. by Massimo Scali | Interstellar by Hans Zimmer performed by Imperial Orchestra choreo. by Corrado Giordani; Miserere by Zucchero Fornaciari & Luciano Pavarotti choreo. by Luca Lanotte | 22 Settembre by Ultimo | |
| 2024–2025 | Two Men in Love by The Irrepressibles choreo. by Massimo Scali | Miserere by Zucchero Fornaciari & Luciano Pavarotti choreo. by Luca Lanotte; Fix You by Coldplay choreo. by Luca Lanotte | 22 settembre by Ultimo; Lost but Won (from Rush) by Hans Zimmer; The Hum by Dimitri Vegas & Like Mike & Ummet Ozcan | |
| 2023–2024 | Two Men in Love by The Irrepressibles choreo. by Massimo Scali; Dernière danse by Indila choreo. by Massimo Scali | Fix You by Coldplay choreo. by Luca Lanotte | Hello by Martin Solveig and Dragonette choreo. by Luca Lanotte | |
| 2022–2023 | Le parole lontane; Zitti e buoni by Måneskin choreo. by Massimo Scali, Corrado Giordani | Talking to the Moon by Bruno Mars; That's What I Like by Bruno Mars and Alan Walker choreo. by Massimo Scali | Hello by Martin Solveig and Dragonette choreo. by Luca Lanotte; Two Men in Love by The Irrepressibles choreo. by Massimo Scali, Corrado Giordani; Che cossè l'amor by Vinicio Capossela | |
| 2021–2022 | Le parole lontane; Zitti e buoni by Måneskin choreo. by Massimo Scali, Corrado Giordani | Two Men in Love by The Irrepressibles choreo. by Massimo Scali, Corrado Giordani | | |
| 2020–2021 | Arranged Piece by Luca Longobardi; A chi mi dice by Blue choreo. by Valter Rizzo, Corrado Giordani | The Greatest Showman: From Now On; The Greatest Show performed by Hugh Jackman choreo. by Valter Rizzo, Corrado Giordani | | |
| 2020–2021 | Romanza by Andrea Bocelli choreo. by Valter Rizzo, Corrado Giordani | The Greatest Showman: From Now On; The Greatest Show performed by Hugh Jackman choreo. by Valter Rizzo, Corrado Giordani | | |
| 2019–2020 | Start a Fire (from La La Land) by John Legend choreo. by Shae-Lynn Bourne | Galicia Flamenca by Gino D'Auri choreo. by Corrado Giordano, Massimo Scali | | |
| 2018–2019 | Volare performed by Luca Longobardi choreo. by Corrado Giordani, Massimo Scali | Bohemian Rhapsody; Love of My Life; Don't Stop Me Now by Queen choreo. by Corrado Giordani, Massimo Scali; Angie; Streets of Love; Paint It Black by The Rolling Stones choreo. by Corrado Giordani, Massimo Scali | Ghostbusters by Ray Parker Jr. | |
| 2017–2018 | Torno A Surriento by Il Volo choreo. by Corrado Giordani, Massimo Scali | Come Together by The Beatles; Let It Be performed by Air With Air Rising; Help! by The Beatles choreo. by Carrado Giordani, Massimo Scali | Everybody Needs Somebody to Love by Jerry Wexler, Bert Berns, Solomon Burke performed by The Blues Brothers | |
| 2016–2017 | Malagueña by Ernesto Lecuona performed by Brian Setzer choreo. by Corrado Giordano, Massimo Scali, Vakhtang Murvanidze | Hallelujah, I Love Her So by Ray Charles; Georgia on My Mind by Ray Charles choreo. by Corrado Giordano, Massimo Scali, Vakhtang Murvanidze | | |
| 2015–2016 | Malagueña by Ernesto Lecuona performed by Brian Setzer choreo. by Corrado Giordano, Massimo Scali, Vakhtang Murvanidze | La donna è mobile (from Rigoletto) by Giuseppe Verdi performed by Luciano Pavarotti; Cavalleria rusticana by Pietro Mascagni; Guillaume Tell by Gioachino Rossini choreo. by Corrado Giordano, Massimo Scali, Vakhtang Murvanidze | | |
| 2014–2015 | Neph by Buckjump choreo. by Corrado Giordano, Massimo Scali, Valter Rizzo | The Kid; Meeting the Millionaire (from City Lights); City Lights; Nonsense Song (from Modern Times) by Carl Davis choreo. by Vakhtang Murvanidze, Valter Rizzo | | |
| 2013–2014 | Take Five by Dave Brubeck choreo. by Vakhtang Murvanidze, Valter Rizzo | The Kid; Meeting the Millionaire (from City Lights); City Lights; Nonsense Song (from Modern Times) by Carl Davis choreo. by Vakhtang Murvanidze, Valter Rizzo | | |

== Competitive highlights ==
- GP – Event of the ISU Grand Prix Series
- JGP – Event of the ISU Junior Grand Prix Series
- CS – Event of the ISU Challenger Series
- TBD – Assigned
- WD – Withdrew from competition
- C – Event was cancelled
- Medals at team events are awarded for the team results only. Individual placements at team events are listed in parentheses.

Competition placements at senior level
| Season | 2013–14 | 2014–15 | 2015–16 | 2016–17 | 2017–18 | 2018–19 | 2019–20 | 2020–21 | 2021–22 | 2022–23 | 2023–24 | 2024–25 | 2025–26 | 2026-27 |
|---|---|---|---|---|---|---|---|---|---|---|---|---|---|---|
| Winter Olympics | | | | | 21st | | | | 16th | | | | 15th | |
| Winter Olympics (Team event) | | | | | 4th | | | | | | | | 3rd | |
| World Championships | | | | 30th | 17th | 7th | C | 11th | 10th | 9th | | | WD | |
| European Championships | | | 13th | | 9th | 3rd | 5th | | | 2nd | 3rd | 5th | 2nd | |
| Italian Championships | | 2nd | 2nd | 2nd | 1st | 2nd | 2nd | 2nd | 2nd | 1st | | 4th | 2nd | |
| World Team Trophy | | | | | | 6th (4th) | | | | 4th (5th) | | | | |
| GP Cup of China | | | | | | | 3rd | | | | | 5th | | |
| GP Finland | | | | | | | | | | | 4th | | 7th | |
| GP NHK Trophy | | | | | | 3rd | | | 5th | 6th | | 5th | 7th | |
| GP Rostelecom Cup | | | | | | | | | 5th | | | | | |
| GP Skate America | | | | | | 4th | | | | | | | | |
| GP Skate Canada | | | | | | | 6th | | | 3rd | 3rd | | | |
| CS Budapest Trophy | | | | | | | | | 1st | 1st | | 1st | | |
| CS Denkova-Staviski Cup | | 1st | 3rd | | | 1st | | | | | | | | |
| CS Finlandia Trophy | | | | | | 6th | | | 6th | | | | | |
| CS Golden Spin of Zagreb | | | | | | | | | | 2nd | | | | |
| CS Lombardia Trophy | | | | | 5th | 4th | 3rd | | | 4th | | | 11th | |
| CS Nebelhorn Trophy | | | | | 4th | | 5th | 5th | | | | | | |
| CS Nepela Memorial | | | | | | | 2nd | | | | | | 2nd | |
| CS Tallinn Trophy | | | | | | | | | | | | | 2nd | |
| CS Warsaw Cup | | 3rd | 5th | 6th | 1st | | | | | | | | | |
| Bavarian Open | 9th | | | 5th | | | | | | | | | | |
| Bellu Memorial | | | | | | | | | | | | 1st | | |
| Challenge Cup | | | | | | | | | | 3rd | | | | |
| Cup of Tyrol | | | | | 2nd | | | | | | | | | |
| Dragon Trophy | 5th | | | | | | | | | | | | | |
| Golden Bear of Zagreb | | | | 4th | | | | | | | | | | |
| Hellmut Seibt Memorial | 2nd | 6th | 7th | | | | | | | | | | | |
| Mentor Toruń Cup | | | | 1st | | | | | | | | | | |
| Merano Cup | | 2nd | 2nd | | | | | | | | | | | |
| NRW Trophy | | | | 6th | | | | | | | | | | |
| Shanghai Trophy | | | | | | | 1st | | | | 4th | | | |
| Sonja Henje Trophy | | | | | | | | | | | | 2nd | | |
| Winter Universiade | | | | | | 1st | | | | | | | | |

Competition placements at junior level
| Season | 2011–12 | 2012–13 | 2013–14 | 2014–15 | 2015–16 | 2016–17 | 2017–18 |
|---|---|---|---|---|---|---|---|
| World Junior Championships | | | 30th | 22nd | 13th | 11th | 3rd |
| Italian Championships | 4th | 5th | 1st | | | | |
| JGP Austria | | | | | 5th | | |
| JGP Germany | | | | 15th | | 12th | |
| JGP Italy | | | | | | | 1st |
| JGP Poland | | | | | | | 6th |
| JGP Slovakia | | | 11th | | | | |
| JGP Slovenia | | | | | | 8th | |
| JGP Spain | | | | | 5th | | |
| Bavarian Open | | 4th | | | | | |
| Crystal Skate of Romania | | 6th | | | | | |
| European Youth Olympic Festival | | | | 4th | | | |
| Ice Star | | 4th | | | | | |
| Lombardia Trophy | | | 3rd | 2nd | | | |
| Santa Claus Cup | | 5th | | | | | |

== Detailed results ==
ISU personal best scores in the +5/-5 GOE System
| Segment | Type | Score | Event |
|---|---|---|---|
| Total | TSS | 275.36 | 2023 World Team Trophy |
| Short program | TSS | 93.37 | 2019 World Championships |
| Short program | TES | 52.41 | 2019 World Championships |
| Short program | PCS | 42.88 | 2022 World Championships |
| Free skating | TSS | 187.35 | 2023 World Team Trophy |
| Free skating | TES | 99.24 | 2023 World Team Trophy |
| Free skating | PCS | 88.11 | 2023 World Team Trophy |

ISU personal best scores in the +3/-3 GOE System
| Segment | Type | Score | Event |
|---|---|---|---|
| Total | TSS | 232.98 | 2017 CS Warsaw Cup |
| Short program | TSS | 78.26 | 2018 European Championships |
| Short program | TES | 43.45 | 2017 JGP Italy |
| Short program | PCS | 36.96 | 2018 World Championships |
| Free skating | TSS | 157.34 | 2017 CS Warsaw Cup |
| Free skating | TES | 82.24 | 2017 CS Warsaw Cup |
| Free skating | PCS | 75.92 | 2018 Winter Olympics |

- Small medals for the short program and free skating are only awarded at ISU Championships.
- Medals at team events are awarded for the team result only. Individual placements at team events are listed in parentheses.

=== Senior level ===
Results in the 2014–15 season
| Date | Event | SP | | FS | | Total | |
| Date | Event | P | Score | P | Score | P | Score |
|---|---|---|---|---|---|---|---|
| 20–21 Dec, 2014 | (Italy) 2015 Italian Championships | 3 | 58.46 | 2 | 127.34 | 2 | 185.80 |

Results in the 2015–16 season
| Date | Event | SP | | FS | | Total | |
| Date | Event | P | Score | P | Score | P | Score |
|---|---|---|---|---|---|---|---|
| 16–19 Dec, 2015 | (Italy) 2016 Italian Championships | 3 | 58.97 | 2 | 135.19 | 2 | 194.16 |

Results in the 2016–17 season
| Date | Event | SP | | FS | | Total | |
| Date | Event | P | Score | P | Score | P | Score |
|---|---|---|---|---|---|---|---|
| Oct 27–30, 2016 | (Croatia) 2016 Golden Bear of Zagreb | 8 | 56.29 | 2 | 122.26 | 4 | 178.55 |
| Nov 17–20, 2016 | (Poland) 2016 CS Warsaw Cup | 3 | 66.55 | 6 | 129.48 | 6 | 196.03 |
| Nov 30 – Dec 4, 2016 | (Germany) 2016 NRW Autumn Trophy | 6 | 57.38 | 5 | 122.27 | 6 | 179.65 |
| Dec 14–17, 2016 | (Italy) 2017 Italian Championships | 2 | 74.47 | 2 | 142.27 | 2 | 216.74 |
| Jan 10–15, 2017 | (Poland) 2017 Mentor Toruń Cup | 1 | 73.00 | 1 | 136.21 | 1 | 209.21 |
| Feb 14–19, 2017 | (Germany) 2017 Bavarian Open | 5 | 65.39 | 3 | 129.79 | 5 | 195.18 |
| Mar 29 – Apr 2, 2017 | (Finland) 2017 World Championships | 30 | 63.14 | —N/a | —N/a | 30 | 63.14 |

Results in the 2017–18 season
| Date | Event | SP | | FS | | Total | |
| Date | Event | P | Score | P | Score | P | Score |
|---|---|---|---|---|---|---|---|
| Sep 14–17, 2017 | (Italy) 2017 CS Lombardia Trophy | 6 | 71.67 | 3 | 155.35 | 5 | 227.02 |
| Sep 27–30, 2017 | (Germany) 2017 CS Nebelhorn Trophy | 5 | 72.97 | 2 | 150.30 | 4 | 223.27 |
| Nov 16–19, 2017 | (Poland) 2017 CS Warsaw Cup | 1 | 75.64 | 1 | 157.34 | 1 | 232.98 |
| Nov 22–25, 2017 | (Austria) 2018 Cup of Tyrol | 3 | 73.70 | 2 | 149.73 | 2 | 223.43 |
| Dec 13–16, 2017 | (Italy) 2018 Italian Championships | 1 | 84.82 | 1 | 158.38 | 1 | 243.20 |
| Jan 15–21, 2018 | (Russia) 2018 European Championships | 6 | 78.26 | 9 | 141.17 | 9 | 219.43 |
| Feb 9–12, 2018 | (South Korea) 2018 Winter Olympics (Team event) | 5 | 77.77 | 4 | 156.11 | 4 | —N/a |
| Feb 9–25, 2018 | (South Korea) 2018 Winter Olympics | 23 | 75.63 | 19 | 156.78 | 21 | 232.41 |
| Mar 19–25, 2018 | (Italy) 2018 World Championships | 18 | 77.43 | 17 | 148.01 | 17 | 225.44 |

Results in the 2018–19 season
| Date | Event | SP | | FS | | Total | |
| Date | Event | P | Score | P | Score | P | Score |
|---|---|---|---|---|---|---|---|
| Sep 12–16, 2018 | (Italy) 2018 CS Lombardia Trophy | 4 | 85.51 | 4 | 142.46 | 4 | 227.97 |
| Oct 4–7, 2018 | (Finland) 2018 CS Finlandia Trophy | 6 | 76.53 | 7 | 141.15 | 6 | 217.68 |
| Oct 19–21, 2018 | (United States) 2018 Skate America | 5 | 78.09 | 5 | 147.72 | 4 | 225.81 |
| Nov 9–11, 2018 | (Japan) 2018 NHK Trophy | 4 | 77.00 | 3 | 147.71 | 3 | 224.71 |
| Nov 27 – Dec 2, 2018 | (Bulgaria) 2018 Denkova–Staviski Cup | 1 | 85.52 | 1 | 139.86 | 1 | 225.38 |
| Dec 13–16, 2018 | (Italy) 2019 Italian Championships | 1 | 87.20 | 2 | 154.42 | 2 | 241.62 |
| Jan 21–27, 2019 | (Belarus) 2019 European Championships | 10 | 81.41 | 3 | 165.67 | 3 | 247.08 |
| Mar 7–9, 2019 | (Russia) 2019 Winter Universiade | 2 | 90.78 | 1 | 182.76 | 1 | 273.54 |
| Mar 18–24, 2019 | (Japan) 2019 World Championships | 5 | 93.37 | 10 | 164.29 | 7 | 257.66 |
| Apr 11–14, 2019 | (Japan) 2019 World Team Trophy | 6 | 87.64 | 5 | 172.89 | 6 (4) | 260.53 |

Results in the 2019–20 season
| Date | Event | SP | | FS | | Total | |
| Date | Event | P | Score | P | Score | P | Score |
|---|---|---|---|---|---|---|---|
| Sep 13–15, 2019 | (Italy) 2019 CS Lombardia Trophy | 5 | 71.76 | 3 | 155.62 | 3 | 227.38 |
| Sep 19–21, 2019 | (Slovakia) 2019 CS Ondrej Nepela Memorial | 4 | 75.87 | 1 | 156.83 | 2 | 232.70 |
| Oct 3–5, 2019 | (China) 2019 Shanghai Trophy | 1 | 87.76 | 3 | 160.77 | 1 | 248.53 |
| Oct 25–27, 2019 | 2019 Skate Canada | 9 | 70.12 | 5 | 153.66 | 6 | 223.78 |
| Nov 8–10, 2019 | 2019 Cup of China | 3 | 81.72 | 4 | 160.16 | 3 | 241.88 |
| Dec 12–15, 2019 | (Italy) 2020 Italian Championships | 1 | 82.08 | 2 | 161.68 | 2 | 243.76 |
| Jan 20–26, 2021 | (Austria) 2020 European Championships | 7 | 79.07 | 5 | 157.94 | 5 | 237.01 |

Results in the 2020–21 season
| Date | Event | SP | | FS | | Total | |
| Date | Event | P | Score | P | Score | P | Score |
|---|---|---|---|---|---|---|---|
| Sep 23–26, 2020 | (Germany) 2020 CS Nebelhorn Trophy | 3 | 77.15 | 7 | 136.99 | 5 | 214.14 |
| Dec 12–13, 2020 | (Italy) 2021 Italian Championships | 3 | 74.81 | 2 | 174.13 | 2 | 248.94 |
| Mar 22–28, 2021 | (Sweden) 2021 World Championships | 11 | 83.30 | 11 | 162.07 | 11 | 245.37 |

Results in the 2021–22 season
| Date | Event | SP | | FS | | Total | |
| Date | Event | P | Score | P | Score | P | Score |
|---|---|---|---|---|---|---|---|
| Oct 7–10, 2021 | (Finland) 2021 CS Finlandia Trophy | 19 | 62.57 | 1 | 176.18 | 6 | 238.75 |
| Oct 14–17, 2021 | (Hungary) 2021 Budapest Trophy | 2 | 72.94 | 1 | 161.46 | 1 | 234.40 |
| Nov 12–14, 2021 | (Japan) 2021 NHK Trophy | 6 | 84.78 | 3 | 171.06 | 5 | 255.84 |
| Nov 26–28, 2021 | (Russia) 2021 Rostelecom Cup | 9 | 77.45 | 2 | 173.02 | 5 | 250.47 |
| Dec 4–5, 2021 | (Italy) 2022 Italian Championships | 2 | 96.66 | 2 | 177.30 | 2 | 273.96 |
| Feb 8–10, 2022 | (China) 2022 Winter Olympics | 13 | 88.63 | 17 | 158.90 | 16 | 247.53 |
| Mar 21–27, 2022 | (France) 2022 World Championships | 8 | 91.67 | 10 | 164.08 | 10 | 255.75 |

Results in the 2022–23 season
| Date | Event | SP | | FS | | Total | |
| Date | Event | P | Score | P | Score | P | Score |
|---|---|---|---|---|---|---|---|
| Sep 13–16, 2022 | (Italy) 2022 CS Lombardia Trophy | 5 | 77.72 | 2 | 148.95 | 4 | 226.67 |
| Oct 21–23, 2022 | (Hungary) 2022 CS Budapest Trophy | 2 | 83.13 | 1 | 170.21 | 1 | 253.34 |
| Oct 28–30, 2022 | 2022 Skate Canada International | 3 | 81.18 | 4 | 169.85 | 3 | 251.03 |
| Nov 18–20, 2022 | (Japan) 2022 NHK Trophy | 7 | 78.57 | 5 | 162.19 | 6 | 240.76 |
| Dec 7–10, 2022 | (Croatia) 2022 CS Golden Spin of Zagreb | 6 | 68.79 | 1 | 160.07 | 2 | 228.86 |
| Dec 15–18, 2022 | (Italy) 2023 Italian Championships | 2 | 87.64 | 2 | 158.00 | 1 | 245.64 |
| Jan 25–29, 2023 | (Finland) 2023 European Championships | 2 | 86.46 | 1 | 173.46 | 2 | 259.92 |
| Feb 23–26, 2023 | (Netherlands) 2023 International Challenge Cup | 3 | 82.85 | 3 | 146.14 | 3 | 228.99 |
| Mar 22–26, 2023 | (Japan) 2023 World Championships | 13 | 79.28 | 7 | 176.76 | 9 | 256.04 |
| Apr 13–16, 2023 | (Japan) 2023 World Team Trophy | 8 | 88.01 | 2 | 187.35 | 4 (5) | 275.36 |

Results in the 2023–24 season
| Date | Event | SP | | FS | | Total | |
| Date | Event | P | Score | P | Score | P | Score |
|---|---|---|---|---|---|---|---|
| Oct 3–5, 2023 | (China) 2023 Shanghai Trophy | 4 | 64.27 | 5 | 136.58 | 4 | 200.85 |
| Oct 27–29, 2023 | 2023 Skate Canada International | 8 | 74.99 | 2 | 171.02 | 3 | 246.01 |
| Nov 17–19, 2023 | (Finland) 2023 Grand Prix of Espoo | 6 | 73.37 | 4 | 168.10 | 4 | 241.47 |
| Jan 10–14, 2024 | (Lithuania) 2024 European Championships | 6 | 80.43 | 2 | 170.44 | 3 | 250.87 |

Results in the 2024–25 season
| Date | Event | SP | | FS | | Total | |
| Date | Event | P | Score | P | Score | P | Score |
|---|---|---|---|---|---|---|---|
| Oct 11–13, 2024 | (Hungary) 2024 CS Budapest Trophy | 1 | 84.77 | 1 | 162.49 | 1 | 247.26 |
| Nov 8–10, 2024 | (Japan) 2024 NHK Trophy | 7 | 81.79 | 4 | 164.77 | 5 | 246.56 |
| Nov 22–24, 2024 | 2024 Cup of China | 5 | 84.92 | 6 | 158.90 | 5 | 243.82 |
| Dec 19–21, 2024 | (Italy) 2025 Italian Championships | 2 | 87.46 | 4 | 142.76 | 4 | 230.22 |
| Jan 28 – Feb 2, 2025 | (Estonia) 2025 European Championships | 4 | 85.68 | 6 | 155.53 | 5 | 241.21 |
| Feb 18–23, 2025 | (Romania) 2025 Bellu Memorial | 1 | 87.59 | 1 | 146.52 | 1 | 234.11 |
| Mar 6–9, 2025 | (Norway) 2025 Sonja Henje Trophy | 2 | 76.75 | 2 | 166.32 | 2 | 243.07 |

Results in the 2025–26 season
| Date | Event | SP | | FS | | Total | |
| Date | Event | P | Score | P | Score | P | Score |
|---|---|---|---|---|---|---|---|
| Sep 11–14, 2025 | (Italy) 2025 CS Lombardia Trophy | 15 | 86.60 | 11 | 126.72 | 11 | 213.32 |
| Sep 25–27, 2025 | (Slovakia) 2025 CS Nepela Memorial | 4 | 82.52 | 2 | 166.94 | 2 | 249.46 |
| Nov 7–9, 2025 | (Japan) 2025 NHK Trophy | 7 | 76.11 | 6 | 153.49 | 7 | 229.60 |
| Nov 21–22, 2025 | (Finland) 2025 Finlandia Trophy | 8 | 78.75 | 7 | 150.80 | 7 | 229.55 |
| Nov 25–30, 2025 | (Estonia) 2025 CS Tallinn Trophy | 2 | 78.23 | 1 | 153.22 | 2 | 231.45 |
| Dec 17–20, 2025 | (Italy) 2026 Italian Championships | 2 | 80.61 | 2 | 164.33 | 2 | 244.94 |
| Jan 13–18, 2026 | (United Kingdom) 2026 European Championships | 4 | 88.00 | 2 | 168.37 | 2 | 256.37 |
| Feb 6–8, 2026 | (Italy) 2026 Winter Olympics – Team event | —N/a | —N/a | 3 | 179.62 | 3 | —N/a |
| Feb 10–13, 2026 | (Italy) 2026 Winter Olympics | 16 | 84.30 | 14 | 158.88 | 15 | 243.18 |

=== Junior level ===
Results in the 2011–12 season
| Date | Event | SP | | FS | | Total | |
| Date | Event | P | Score | P | Score | P | Score |
|---|---|---|---|---|---|---|---|
| Dec 15–18, 2011 | (Italy) 2012 Italian Championships (Junior) | 5 | 37.16 | 4 | 76.39 | 4 | 113.55 |

Results in the 2012–13 season
| Date | Event | SP | | FS | | Total | |
| Date | Event | P | Score | P | Score | P | Score |
|---|---|---|---|---|---|---|---|
| Dec 19–22, 2012 | (Italy) 2013 Italian Championships (Junior) | 1 | 46.93 | 6 | 72.48 | 5 | 119.41 |

Results in the 2013–14 season
| Date | Event | SP | | FS | | Total | |
| Date | Event | P | Score | P | Score | P | Score |
|---|---|---|---|---|---|---|---|
| Dec 18–21, 2013 | (Italy) 2014 Italian Championships (Junior) | 1 | 51.84 | 1 | 107.23 | 1 | 159.07 |

Results in the 2012–13 season
| Date | Event | SP | | FS | | Total | |
| Date | Event | P | Score | P | Score | P | Score |
|---|---|---|---|---|---|---|---|
| Oct 30 – Nov 4, 2012 | 2012 Crystal Skate of Romania | 7 | 35.99 | 5 | 79.62 | 6 | 115.61 |
| Feb 6–11, 2013 | (Germany) 2013 Bavarian Open | 5 | 47.97 | 4 | 97.27 | 4 | 145.24 |

Results in the 2013–14 season
| Date | Event | SP | | FS | | Total | |
| Date | Event | P | Score | P | Score | P | Score |
|---|---|---|---|---|---|---|---|
| Sep 12–15, 2013 | 2013 JGP Slovakia | 18 | 44.14 | 11 | 96.95 | 11 | 141.09 |
| Sep 19–22, 2013 | (Italy) 2013 Lombardia Trophy | 4 | 44.00 | 3 | 91.23 | 3 | 135.23 |
| Mar 10–16, 2014 | (Bulgaria) 2014 World Junior Championships | 30 | 46.65 | – | – | 30 | 46.65 |

Results in the 2014–15 season
| Date | Event | SP | | FS | | Total | |
| Date | Event | P | Score | P | Score | P | Score |
|---|---|---|---|---|---|---|---|
| Oct 1–4, 2014 | 2014 JGP Germany | 19 | 42.45 | 10 | 100.03 | 15 | 142.48 |
| Mar 2–8, 2015 | (Estonia) 2015 World Junior Championships | 20 | 55.61 | 21 | 99.01 | 22 | 154.62 |

Results in the 2015–16 season
| Date | Event | SP | | FS | | Total | |
| Date | Event | P | Score | P | Score | P | Score |
|---|---|---|---|---|---|---|---|
| Sep 9–12, 2015 | 2015 JGP Austria | 9 | 53.37 | 4 | 119.08 | 5 | 172.45 |
| Sep 30 – Oct 3, 2015 | 2015 JGP Spain | 6 | 58.89 | 5 | 115.35 | 5 | 174.24 |
| Mar 14–20, 2016 | (Hungary) 2016 World Junior Championships | 11 | 66.79 | 17 | 116.17 | 13 | 182.96 |

Results in the 2016–17 season
| Date | Event | SP | | FS | | Total | |
| Date | Event | P | Score | P | Score | P | Score |
|---|---|---|---|---|---|---|---|
| Sep 21–24, 2016 | 2016 JGP Slovenia | 10 | 55.91 | 8 | 122.17 | 8 | 178.08 |
| Oct 5–8, 2016 | 2016 JGP Germany | 12 | 53.78 | 13 | 105.43 | 12 | 159.21 |
| Mar 15–19, 2017 | (Taiwan) 2017 World Junior Championships | 13 | 68.53 | 11 | 128.94 | 11 | 197.47 |

Results in the 2017–18 season
| Date | Event | SP | | FS | | Total | |
| Date | Event | P | Score | P | Score | P | Score |
|---|---|---|---|---|---|---|---|
| Oct 4–7, 2017 | 2017 JGP Poland | 2 | 74.51 | 10 | 118.28 | 6 | 192.79 |
| Oct 10–14, 2017 | 2017 JGP Italy | 2 | 77.24 | 1 | 151.94 | 1 | 229.18 |
| Mar 5–11, 2018 | (Bulgaria) 2018 World Junior Championships | 6 | 70.24 | 6 | 141.34 | 3 | 211.58 |
