= Bella figlia dell'amore =

Vocal quartet from the opera Rigoletto by Giueseppe Verdi

Bella figlia dell'amore
Enrico Caruso, Bessie Abott, Louise Homer and Antonio Scotti, 1907 Victor Records recording

"Bella figlia dell'amore" ("Beautiful daughter of love") is a vocal quartet from the last act of Giuseppe Verdi's 1851 opera Rigoletto.

It has been described as a "masterful quartet that is an intricate musical depiction of four personalities and their overlapping agendas", and has been performed and recorded by many notable artists.

The plot of the 2012 film Quartet revolves around a performance of this quartet.

Rigoletto Paraphrase (1859, S. 434) is a virtuoso piano arrangement of the quartet by Franz Liszt. Another paraphrase was written by German composer Wilhelm Krüger (1820–1883) as his Op. 61.

== Libretto ==
Italian
DUCA: Un dì, se ben rammentomi,
o bella, t'incontrai...
Mi piacque di te chiedere
e intesi che qui stai.
Or sappi che d'allora
sol te quest'alma adora.

GILDA (da sé): Iniquo!

MADDALENA: Ah! Ah!...e vent'altre appresso
le scorda forse adesso?
Ha un'aria il signorino
da vero libertino.

DUCA: Sì, un mostro son.
GILDA: Ah, padre mio!
MADDALENA: Lasciatemi, stordito!
DUCA: Ah, che fracasso!
MADDALENA: Stia saggio!

DUCA: E tu sii docile,
non farmi tanto, chiasso.
Ogni saggezza chiudesi
nel gaudio e nell'amore.
(Le prende la mano.)
La bella mano candida!

MADDALENA: Scherzate voi, signore.
DUCA: No, no.
MADDALENA: Son brutta.
DUCA: Abbracciami.
GILDA (da sé): Iniquo!
MADDALENA: Ebbro!
DUCA: D'amore ardente.

MADDALENA: Signor l'indifferente,
vi piace canzonar?

DUCA: No, no, ti vo' sposar...

MADDALENA: Ne voglio la parola.
DUCA (ironico): Amabile figliuola!
RIGOLETTO (a Gilda che avrà tutto osservato ed inteso):
E non ti basta ancor?
GILDA: Iniquo traditor!

DUCA: Bella figlia dell'amore,
schiavo son dei vezzi tuoi;
con un detto sol tu puoi
le mie pene consolar.
Vieni e senti del mio core
il frequente palpitar.

MADDALENA: Ah! ah! rido ben di core,
che tai baie costan poco,
quanto valga il vostro gioco,
mel credete, so apprezzar.
Son avvezza, bel signore,
ad un simile scherzar,
mio bel signor!

GILDA: Ah, così parlar d'amore
a me pur l'infame ho udito!
Infelice cor tradito,
per angoscia non scoppiar.

RIGOLETTO: Taci, il piangere non vale,
Ch'ei mentiva sei sicura.
Taci, e mia sarà la cura
la vendetta d'affrettar.
Pronta fia, sarà fatale,
io saprollo fulminar!

Literal translation
DUKE: One day, if I remember well,
oh beautiful, I met you ...
I liked you to ask
and understood that you are here.
Now know that since then
only you this soul adores.

GILDA (to herself): Unfair!

MADDALENA: Ah! Ah! ... and twenty others below,
perhaps you forget them now?
He looks like the young gentleman
like a true libertine.

DUKE: Yes, I am a monster.
GILDA: Ah, my father!
MADDALENA: Leave me stunned!
DUKE: Ah, what a din!
MADDALENA: Be wise!

DUKE: And you be docile,
don't make me so much fuss.
All wisdom closed
in joy and love.
(He takes her hand.)
The beautiful white hand!

MADDALENA: Are you kidding, sir.
DUKE: No, no.
MADDALENA: I'm ugly.
DUKE: Hug me.
GILDA (to herself): Unfair!
MADDALENA: Drunkard!
DUKE: Of burning love.

MADDALENA: Mr. Indifferent,
do you like to make fun?

DUKE: No, no, I want to marry you ...

MADDALENA: I want the word.
DUKE (ironic): Lovable daughter!
RIGOLETTO (to Gilda, who has observed and understood everything):
And isn't that enough for you yet?
GILDA: Unfair traitor!

DUKE: Beautiful daughter of Love,
I am a slave to your charms;
with only one saying you can
console my pains.
Come and feel
the frequent palpitation of my heart.

MADDALENA: Ah! ah! I laugh heartily,
that these bays are cheap,
how much is your game worth,
you believe me, I know how to appreciate.
I am accustomed, handsome gentleman,
to such a joke,
my handsome mister!

GILDA: Ah, so I heard
the infamous talk about love!
Unhappy betrayed heart,
do not burst out of anguish.

RIGOLETTO: Shut up, crying is not worth it,
He was lying, you are sure.
Shut up, and my cure will be
the revenge of hurrying.
Ready to go, it will be fatal
I know how to strike him!
