= Heuvelton, New York =

- Village
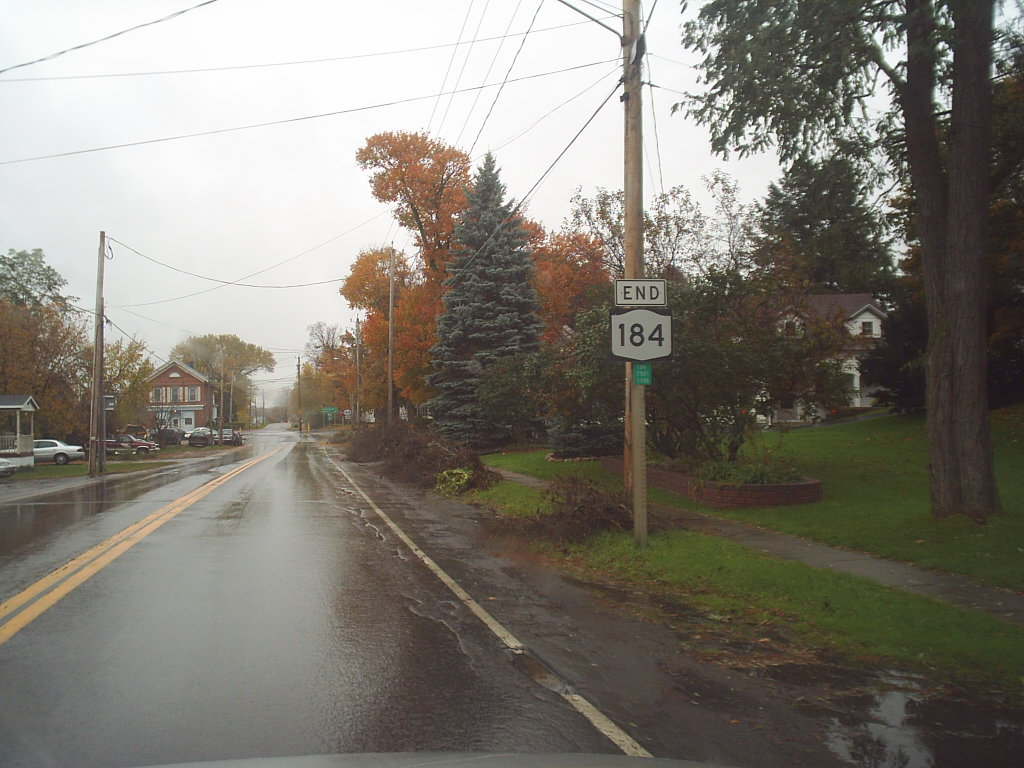

- Location within the state of New York
- Coordinates: 44°37′6″N 75°24′22″W
- Country: United States
- State: New York
- County: St. Lawrence

Government
  - Village Mayor: Barbara Lashua
  - Village Deputy Mayor: Gus Guardino

Area
  - Total: 0.87 sq mi (2.25 km^{2})
  - Land: 0.76 sq mi (1.97 km^{2})
  - Water: 0.11 sq mi (0.28 km^{2})
- Elevation: 315 ft (96 m)

Population (2020)
  - Total: 722
  - Density: 949.1/sq mi (366.44/km^{2})
- Time zone: UTC-5 (EST)
  - Summer (DST): UTC-4 (EDT)
- ZIP codes: 13654
- Area code: 315
- FIPS code: 36-34264
- Website: https://www.heuveltonny.com/

Heuvelton is an incorporated village in St. Lawrence County, New York, United States. It is approximately six miles (9.7 km) southeast of the city of Ogdensburg, in the Town of Oswegatchie. It is the only village in the town. Route 812 bisects the village, and is named State Street within the village boundaries. As of the 2020 census, Heuvelton had a population of 722.

== History ==
The settlement that became Heuvelton was originally named "Fordsburgh" after Nathan Ford, the man who has since become known as the "Father of St. Lawrence County". He is known to have established a second home in the village (principal home in Ogdensburg) and assisted in some of the area's early development. Early on, the location was also called "East Branch," in reference to its location on the east branch of the Oswegatchie River. The current name was assumed in 1832 to honor Jacob Van den Heuvel, an immigrant from The Netherlands, who invested in several extensive improvements including mill construction, marking the first notable economic growth in the early community.

The McCadam Cheese Company was founded in Heuvelton in 1876 by William McCadam. The Heuvelton packaging plant has closed.

== Geography ==
The Oswegatchie River flows through the village, with approximately two-thirds of the village, including the commercial district, lying on the northwest bank.

According to the United States Census Bureau, the village has a total area of 0.9 square miles (2.3 km^{2}), of which 0.8 square miles (2.1 km^{2}) is land and 0.1 square miles (0.26 km^{2}) (10.34%) is water.

== Demographics ==
Historical population
| Census | Pop. | Note | %± |
|---|---|---|---|
| 1880 | 513 | | — |
| 1920 | 559 | | — |
| 1930 | 578 | | 3.4% |
| 1940 | 620 | | 7.3% |
| 1950 | 712 | | 14.8% |
| 1960 | 810 | | 13.8% |
| 1970 | 770 | | −4.9% |
| 1980 | 777 | | 0.9% |
| 1990 | 771 | | −0.8% |
| 2000 | 804 | | 4.3% |
| 2010 | 714 | | −11.2% |
| 2020 | 722 | | 1.1% |
U.S. Decennial Census

As of the census of 2000, there were 804 people, 313 households, and 213 families residing in the village. The population density was 1,042.5 inhabitants per square mile (402.5/km^{2}). There were 332 housing units at an average density of 430.5 per square mile (166.2/km^{2}). The racial makeup of the village was 97.39% White, 0.62% African American, 0.50% Native American, 0.12% Asian, and 1.37% from two or more races. Hispanic or Latino of any race were 0.50% of the population.

There were 313 households, out of which 33.2% had children under the age of 18 living with them, 52.4% were married couples living together, 11.8% had a female householder with no husband present, and 31.9% were non-families. 25.9% of all households were made up of individuals, and 14.4% had someone living alone who was 65 years of age or older. The average household size was 2.49 and the average family size was 2.93.

In the village, the population was spread out, with 24.3% under the age of 18, 6.0% from 18 to 24, 28.7% from 25 to 44, 27.0% from 45 to 64, and 14.1% who were 65 years of age or older. The median age was 40 years. For every 100 females, there were 86.1 males. For every 100 females age 18 and over, there were 88.5 males.

The median income for a household in the village was $34,375, and the median income for a family was $38,056. Males had a median income of $30,114 versus $20,982 for females. The per capita income for the village was $16,276. About 11.3% of families and 13.7% of the population were below the poverty line, including 21.6% of those under age 18 and 10.1% of those age 65 or over.

== Economy ==
Heuvelton encourages tourism, and is a location to purchase locally made goods. There is a cheese producer in Heuvelton.

== Arts and culture ==
Pickens Hall was listed on the National Register of Historic Places in 2004. Pickens General Store is located inside Pickens Hall, and sells local Amish-made goods and non-electric products. The three-story stone structure, built-in 1858 by John Pickens, had a former music hall on the third floor where the builder's twin granddaughters (Bessie and Jessie Pickens) once performed as opera singers under the stage name "The Abbot Sisters".

== Education ==
It is in the Heuvelton Central School District.

Heuvelton Central School is a K-12 school that serves surrounding communities.

== Infrastructure ==
A one-megawatt hydroelectric dam owned by Erie Boulevard Hydropower is located in Heuvelton. Construction of a fish passage around the dam started in 2017
