= Bessie Abott =

American opera singer

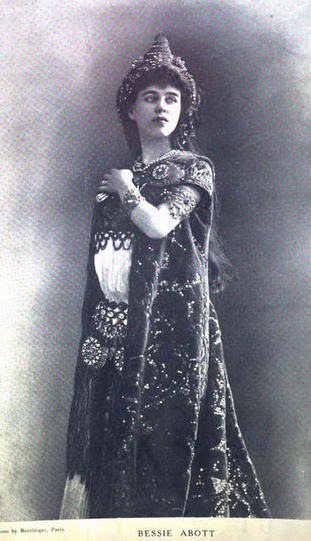

Background information
- Born: Bessie Pickens; 1878; Heuvelton, New York, U.S.
- Died: February 9, 1919 (aged 40–41)
- Genres: Opera

"Bella figlia dell'amore"
Rigoletto, Act 3. A Victor Records recording with Enrico Caruso, Bessie Abott, Louise Homer and Antonio Scotti from 1907.

Bessie Abott (1878 – February 9, 1919) was an American operatic soprano who had an active international career during the early 20th century. She was particularly associated with the Paris Opera and the Metropolitan Opera, and excelled in performances of Italian and French operas of the Romantic Period.

== Biography ==
Bessie Abott was one of twin daughters, Bessie and Jessie, born in Heuvelton, New York as Bessie Pickens to John Pickens Jr., and his wife, Frances Josephine Button. She utilized her grandmother's maiden name, Abbott, as her stage name and later dropped one "b" after she saw a misprinted theater program in Paris.

Abott made her professional stage debut in a vaudeville act with her twin sister Jessie at Pickens Hall, which was built by her grandfather, John Pickens Sr. The act was known as the Abbott Sisters. In 1894 she was hired by Edward E. Rice to star in the American premiere of Ivan Caryll's Little Christopher Columbus at the Garden Theatre in New York. The following year, she was engaged by Rice to star in a successful revival of R. A. Barnet's 1492 Up to Date. While in New York she studied singing with Frida Ashforth.

In 1897 Abott went to London where she performed in operettas in the West End. While there, she drew the attention of Jean de Reszke in 1898 after he saw her perform. He advised her to pursue an opera career, and she briefly studied singing with him. Under de Reszke's advice, she moved to Paris to study singing with Jacques Bouhy, Victor Capoul, and Mathilde Marchesi for the next three years.

Bessie made her professional opera debut at the Palais Garnier in Paris as Juliette in Charles Gounod's Roméo et Juliette. She remained committed to the Paris Opera for the next five years. At the Paris Opera she notably portrayed the Forest Bird in Richard Wagner's Siegfried with her mentor, de Reszke, in the title role. Other roles she sang in Paris included Andreloun in Gounod's Mireille and Zerlina in Mozart's Don Giovanni.

After leaving the Paris Opera, Abott was committed to the Metropolitan Opera in New York City from 1906 to 1908. She made her Met debut as Mimì in Puccini's La boheme under the baton of conductor Arturo Vigna on January 20, 1906. Other roles she sang with the Met included Gilda in Verdi's Rigoletto, Juliette in Gounod's Roméo et Juliette, Lady Harriet in Flotow's Martha, Marguerite in Gounod's Faust, Micaela in Bizet's Carmen, and Violetta in Verdi's La Traviata. Her final performance with the Met was as Philine in an out-of-town performance of Thomas' Mignon on April 24, 1908 in Chicago.

During her years at the Met, Abott also occasionally performed in concerts and operas in other American cities. She notably sang in a production of Carmen with Enrico Caruso in San Francisco's Grand Opera House the night before the 1906 San Francisco earthquake. After leaving the Met she returned to Europe where she appeared in operas in Lisbon, Monte Carlo, Paris, and Petrograd. In 1910–1911 she toured the United States with her own opera company starring in a production of La boheme. Her final performance was as Janet in a 1913 revival of Reginald De Koven's Robin Hood in New York.

Abott married sculptor and poet Waldo Story in 1912 and retired from her career. She was widowed in 1915. She died in 1919, at the age of 40, "after an illness of several years."
