= Gaetano Mares =

Italian conductor

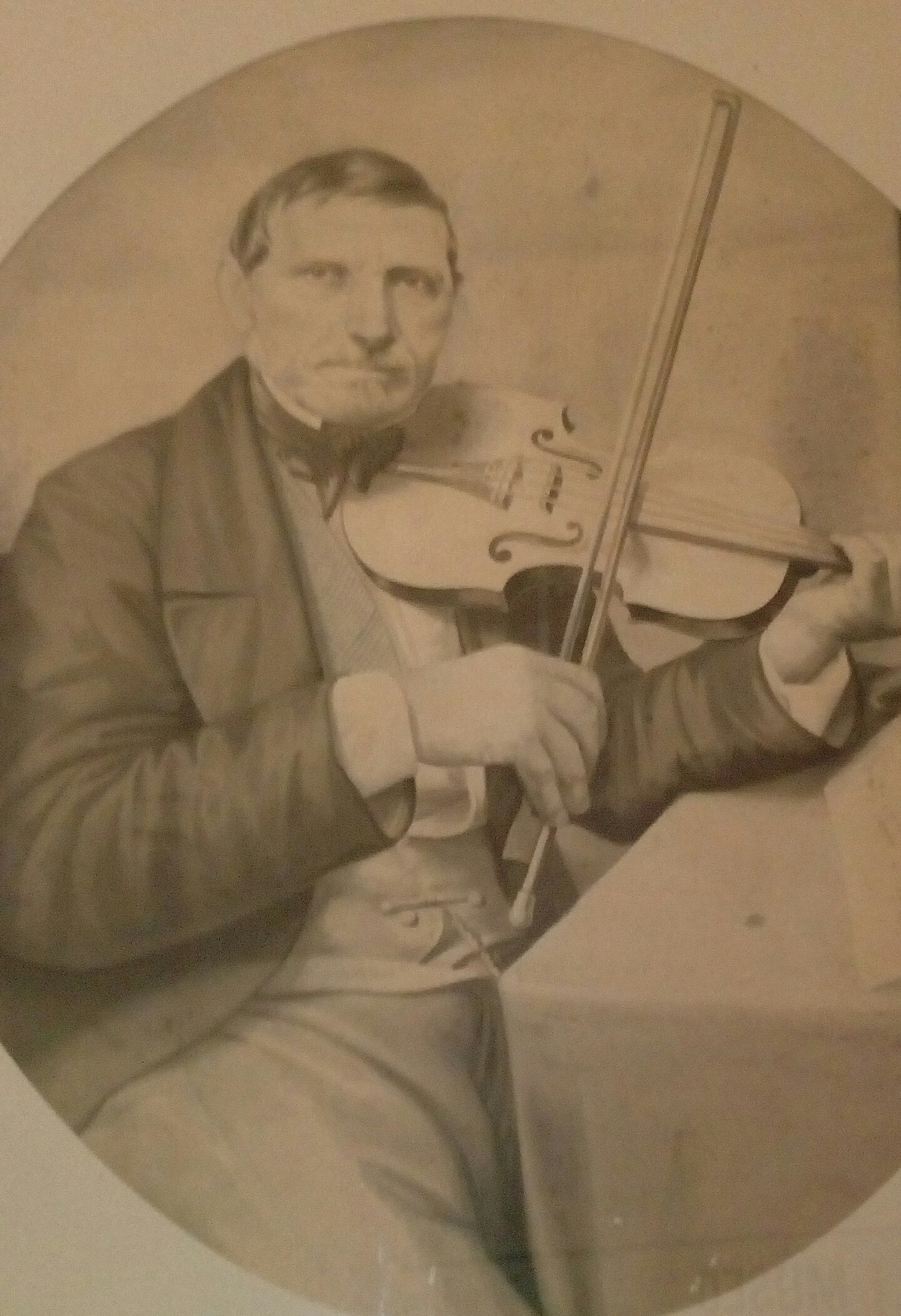
Gaetano Mares

Gaetano Mares (1793–1862) was an Italian conductor. He notably conducted the world premieres of Giuseppe Verdi's Ernani (1844), Attila (opera) (1846), Rigoletto (1851) and La traviata (1853) at La Fenice in Venice.
