= Raffaele Mirate =

Italian opera singer

- Born: 3 September 1815; Naples, Italy
- Died: November 1895
- Occupation: Celebrated Italian operatic tenor
- Years active: 1830s-1860s

Raffaele Mirate (3 September 1815 – November 1895) was a celebrated Italian operatic tenor who had an active career from the 1830s through the 1860s. Known for his intelligent phrasing and bright and powerful vocal timbre, he was regarded as an outstanding interpreter of the tenor roles in the early and middle period operas of Giuseppe Verdi. He notably created the role of the Duke of Mantua in the world premiere of Verdi's Rigoletto in 1851. He was also a highly regarded interpreter of bel canto roles, excelling in the operas of Vincenzo Bellini, Gaetano Donizetti, and Gioachino Rossini.

== Biography ==
Born in Naples, Mirate was a pupil of Alessandro Busti and the famous castrato Girolamo Crescentini at the Regio Collegio di Musica. His first opera performance was in a school production in 1834. His official opera début came three years later at the Teatro Nuovo in Naples as the title hero in Donizetti's Torquato Tasso. From 1836 through 1839 he worked primarily in Naples, although he did appear as a guest performer at the Teatro San Cassiano in Venice as Edgardo in Lucia di Lammermoor.

In 1839 Mirate arrived at the Théâtre Italien in Paris where he attracted wide acclaim singing roles in operas by Donizetti, Rossini, and Bellini. He made his first appearance at La Scala in 1840 as Amenofi in Rossini's Mosè in Egitto to great success. In 1844 he was again a guest at the Théâtre-Italien in Paris. In 1845 he was heard at the Teatro Argentina in Rome as Jacopo in I due Foscari and Charles VII in Giovanna d'Arco. The librettist Francesco Maria Piave, who was a frequent collaborator with Verdi, was in attendance at these Rome performances and likened Mirate's voice to the great lyric tenor, Napoleone Moriani.

During the late 1840s and early 1850s, Mirate was busy singing at the opera houses of Venice, Genoa and Milan. In 1848 he participated in the world premiere of Carlo Boniforti's Giovanna di Fiandra at La Scala. By 1850 he was the highest paid singer at La Fenice, and it is at this house that he portrayed the role with which he became most identified, the Duke in Verdi's Rigoletto. His performance of the bravura aria "La donna è mobile" was hailed as the highlight of the opera's premiere performance on 11 March 1851. A more commanding Duke than some subsequent tenors, he went on to perform the role over 190 times during the rest of his career.

Mirate sang at several more premieres at La Fenice, including portraying Don Carlo in Antonio Buzzolla's Elisabetta di Valois (1850), Don Alvaro in Francesco Malipiero's Fernando Cortez (1851), and Arminio in Giovanni Pacini's La punizione (1854). He also appeared in numerous world premieres at the Teatro di San Carlo in Naples during the 1850s, including Admeto in Giuseppe Staffa's Alceste (1852), the title role in Nicola De Giosa's Guido Colmar (1852), Cassandro in Saverio Mercadante's Statira (1853), the title role in Ferdinando Tommasi's Guido Colmar (1855), and a role in the premiere of Giovanni Pacini's Margherita Pusterla (1856). In 1857 he portrayed Casimiro in the premiere of Emanuele Muzio's La sorrentina at the Teatro Comunale di Bologna.

From 1854 to 1855, Mirate performed with great success at La Scala, notably singing Manrico in Verdi's Il trovatore to the approval of the composer. He sang in Boston and New York in 1856 and then at the Teatro Colón in Buenos Aires during that house's first season in 1857. He returned to Buenos Aires in 1860, also making appearances in Montevideo and Rio de Janeiro while he was in South America. He retired in 1861, but came out of retirement two year later to sing at the Teatro di San Carlo from 1863 to 1866. While there he sang in two world premieres, portraying Rodrigo in Errico Petrella's Celinda and Icilio in Mercadante's Virginia. He died in Sorrento in 1895 at the age of 80.
