= Rigoletto =

1851 opera by Giuseppe Verdi

- Opera by Giuseppe Verdi
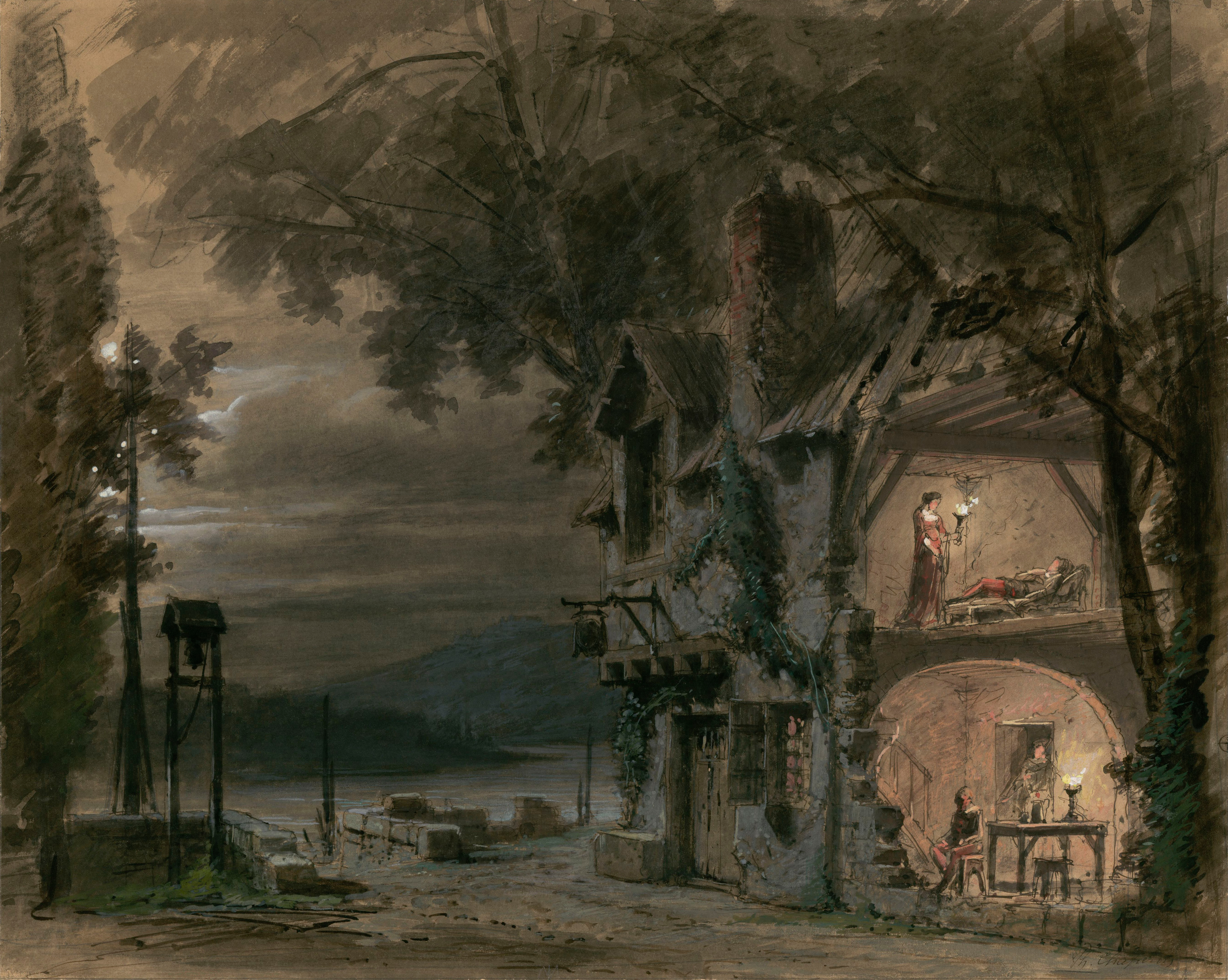
- Set design by Philippe Chaperon
- Librettist: Francesco Maria Piave
- Language: Italian
- Based on: Le roi s'amuse by Victor Hugo
- Premiere: 11 March 1851; La Fenice, Venice

Rigoletto is an opera in three acts (Note: Some scores, such as the Schirmer piano-vocal score, present the opera in four acts, with the two scenes which normally constitute act 1 appearing as separate acts.) by Giuseppe Verdi. The Italian libretto was written by Francesco Maria Piave based on the 1832 play Le roi s'amuse by Victor Hugo. Despite serious initial problems with the Austrian censors who had control over northern Italian theatres at the time, the opera had a triumphant premiere at La Fenice in Venice on 11 March 1851.

The work, Verdi's sixteenth in the genre, is widely considered to be the first of the operatic masterpieces of Verdi's middle-to-late career. Its tragic story revolves around the licentious Duke of Mantua, his hunch-backed court jester Rigoletto, and Rigoletto's daughter Gilda. The opera's original title, La maledizione (The Curse), refers to a curse placed on both the Duke and Rigoletto by the Count Monterone, whose daughter the Duke has seduced with Rigoletto's encouragement. The curse comes to fruition when Gilda falls in love with the Duke and sacrifices her life to save him from the assassin hired by her father.

== Composition history ==
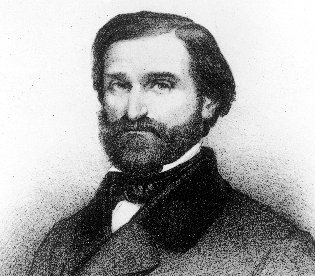
Verdi c. 1850

La Fenice of Venice commissioned Verdi in 1850 to compose a new opera. He was prominent enough by this time to enjoy some freedom in choosing texts to set to music. He initially asked Francesco Maria Piave (with whom he had already created Ernani, I due Foscari, Macbeth, Il corsaro and Stiffelio) to examine the play Kean by Alexandre Dumas, père, but soon came to believe that they needed to find a more energetic subject.

That came in the form of Victor Hugo's controversial five-act play Le roi s'amuse ("The king amuses himself"). Verdi later explained that "The subject is grand, immense, and there is a character that is one of the greatest creations that the theatre can boast of, in any country and in all history." However, Hugo's depiction of a venal, cynical, womanizing king (Francis I of France) was considered unacceptably scandalous. The play had been banned in France following its premiere nearly twenty years earlier (not to be staged again until 1882); now it was to come before the Austrian Board of Censors (as Austria at that time directly controlled much of Northern Italy.)

From the beginning, both composer and librettist knew this step would not be easy. As Verdi wrote in a letter to Piave: "Use four legs, run through the town and find me an influential person who can obtain the permission for making Le Roi s'amuse." Guglielmo Brenna, secretary of La Fenice, promised the duo that they would not have problems with the censors. He was wrong, and rumours began to spread in early summer that the production would be forbidden. In August, Verdi and Piave retired to Busseto, Verdi's hometown, to prepare a defensive scheme as they continued work on the opera. Despite their best efforts, including frantic correspondence with La Fenice, the Austrian censor De Gorzkowski emphatically denied consent to the production of "La Maledizione" (its working title) in a December 1850 letter, calling the opera "a repugnant [example of] immorality and obscene triviality."

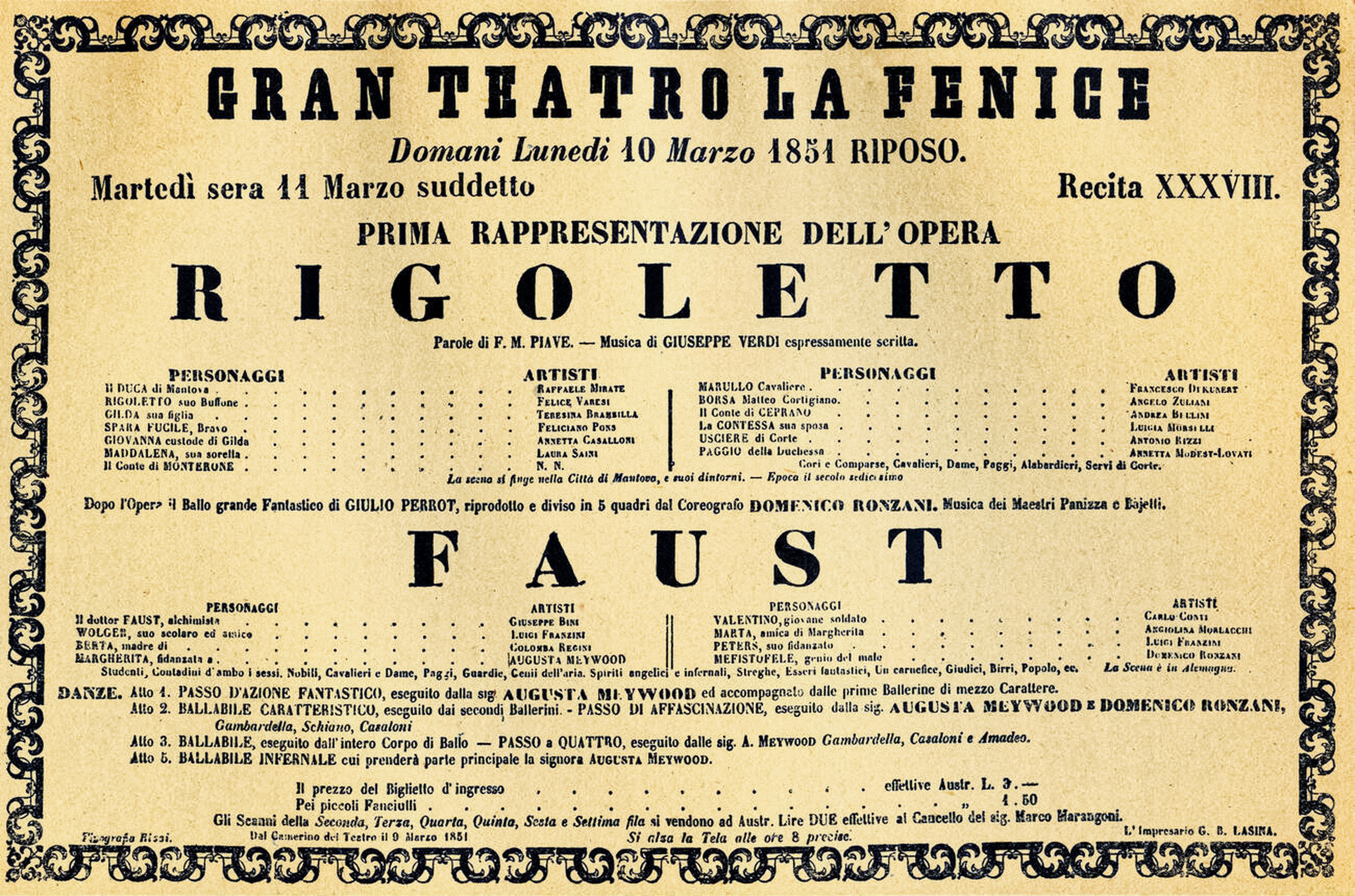
La Fenice's poster for the world premiere of Rigoletto

Piave set to work revising the libretto, eventually pulling from it another opera, Il Duca di Vendome, in which the sovereign was a duke and both the hunchback and the curse disappeared. Verdi was completely against this proposed solution, preferring to negotiate directly with the censors over each and every point of the work. Brenna, La Fenice's sympathetic secretary, mediated the dispute by showing the Austrians some letters and articles depicting the bad character, but great value, of the artist. By January 1851 the parties had settled on a compromise: the action of the opera would be moved, and some of the characters would be renamed. In the new version, the Duke would preside over Mantua and belong to the Gonzaga family. (The house of Gonzaga had long been extinct by the mid-19th century, and the dukedom of Mantua no longer existed.) The scene in which he retired to Gilda's bedroom would be deleted, and his visit to the Taverna (inn) would no longer be intentional, but the result of a trick. The hunchbacked jester (originally called Triboulet) was renamed Rigoletto (Note: Rigoler is French for "to laugh" or "to lark", and rigolo is Italian for "funny".) from a parody of a comedy by Jules-Édouard Alboize de Pujol: Rigoletti, ou Le dernier des fous (Rigoletti, or The last of the jesters) of 1835. By 14 January, the opera's definitive title had become Rigoletto.

Verdi finally completed the composition on 5 February 1851, a little more than a month before the premiere. Piave had already arranged for the sets to be designed while Verdi was still working on the final stages of act 3. The singers were given some of their music to learn on 7 February. However, Verdi kept at least a third of the score at Busseto. He brought it with him when he arrived in Venice for the rehearsals on 19 February, and would continue refining the orchestration throughout the rehearsal period. For the première, La Fenice had cast Felice Varesi as Rigoletto, the tenor Raffaele Mirate as the Duke, and Teresa Brambilla as Gilda (although Verdi would have preferred Teresa De Giuli Borsi). Due to a high risk of unauthorised copying, Verdi demanded extreme secrecy from all his singers and musicians, particularly Mirate: the "Duke" had the use of his score for only a few evenings before the première, and was made to swear that he would not sing or even whistle the tune of "La donna è mobile" except during rehearsal.

== Performance history ==
Felice Varesi, the first Rigoletto

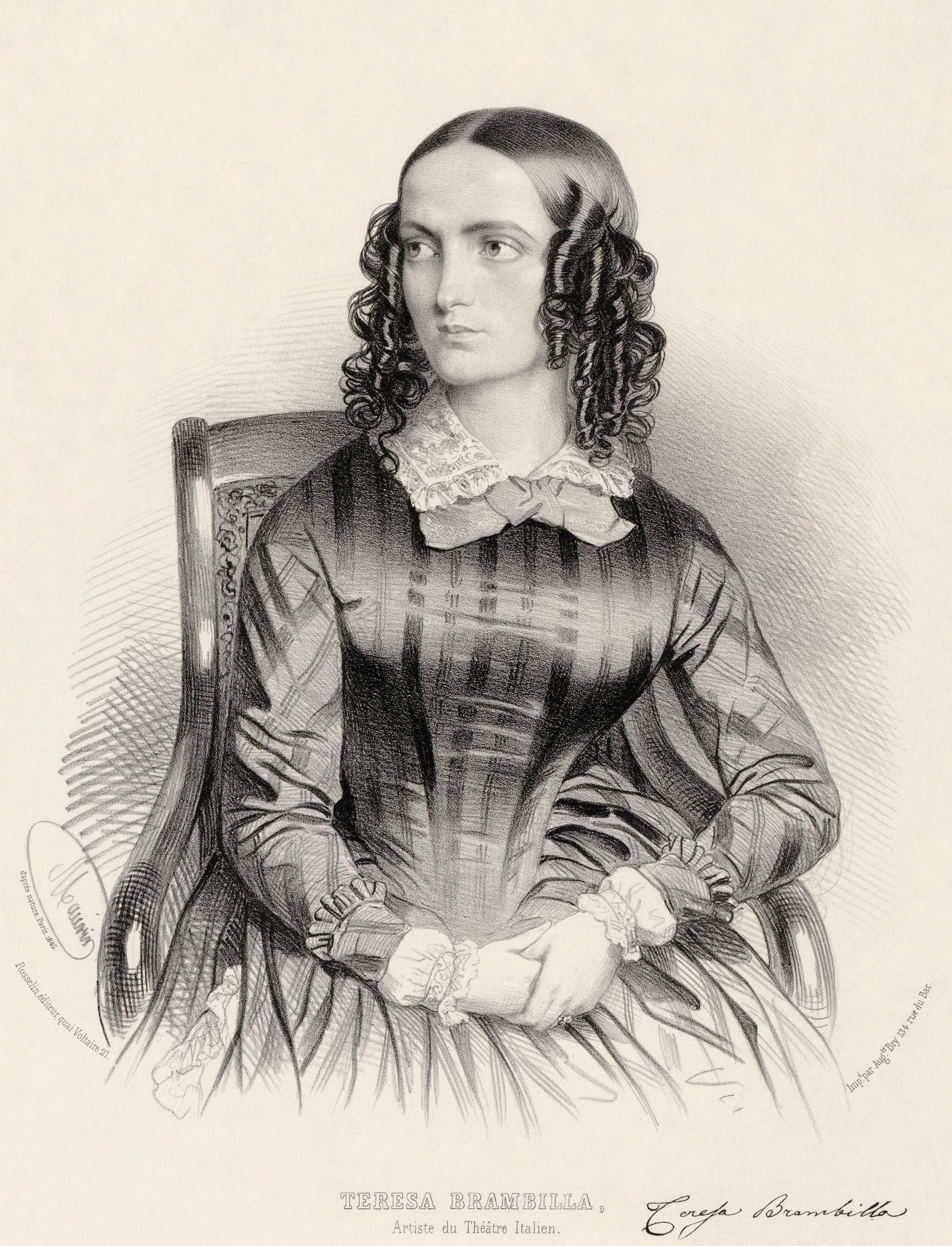
Teresa Brambilla, the first Gilda

=== 19th-century productions ===
Rigoletto premiered on 11 March 1851 in a sold-out La Fenice as the first part of a double bill with Giacomo Panizza's ballet Faust. Gaetano Mares conducted, and the sets were designed and executed by Giuseppe Bertoja and Francesco Bagnara. The opening night was a complete triumph, especially the scena drammatica and the Duke's cynical aria, "La donna è mobile", which was sung in the streets the next morning. Verdi had maximised the aria's impact by only revealing it to the cast and orchestra a few hours before the premiere, and forbidding them to sing, whistle or even think of the melody outside of the theatre. Many years later, Giulia Cora Varesi, the daughter of Felice Varesi (the original Rigoletto), described her father's performance at the premiere. Varesi was very uncomfortable with the false hump he had to wear; he was so uncertain that, even though he was quite an experienced singer, he had a panic attack when it was his turn to enter the stage. Verdi immediately realised he was paralysed and roughly pushed him on the stage, so he appeared with a clumsy tumble. The audience, thinking it was an intentional gag, was very amused.

Rigoletto was a great box-office success for La Fenice and Verdi's first major Italian triumph since the 1847 premiere of Macbeth in Florence. It initially had a run of 13 performances and was revived in Venice the following year, and again in 1854. Despite a rather disastrous production in Bergamo shortly after its initial run at La Fenice, the opera soon entered the repertory of Italian theatres. By 1852, it had premiered in all the major cities of Italy, although sometimes under different titles due to the vagaries of censorship (e.g. as Viscardello, Lionello, and Clara de Perth). (Note: The opera was performed as Viscardello in Bologna and as both Lionello and Clara de Perth in Naples.) From 1852, it also began to be performed in major cities worldwide, as far afield as Alexandria and Constantinople in 1854 and both Montevideo and Havana in 1855. The UK premiere took place on 14 May 1853 at what is now the Royal Opera House, Covent Garden in London, with Giovanni Matteo Mario as the Duke of Mantua and Giorgio Ronconi as Rigoletto, conducted by Michael Costa. In the US, the opera was first performed on 19 February 1855 at New York's Academy of Music by the Max Maretzek Italian Opera Company.

=== 20th century and beyond ===
Several modern productions have radically changed the original setting. These include Jonathan Miller's 1982 production for the English National Opera, which is set amongst the Mafia in New York City's Little Italy during the 1950s; Doris Dörrie's 2005 production for the Bavarian State Opera, where the Court of Mantua became The Planet of the Apes; director Linda Brovsky's production for Seattle Opera, placing the story in Mussolini's fascist Italy, in 2004 (repeated in 2014); and Michael Mayer's 2013 production for the Metropolitan Opera, which is set in a casino in 1960s Las Vegas. Different characters portray different archetypes from the Rat Pack era, with the Duke becoming a Frank Sinatra-type character and Rigoletto becoming Don Rickles. In March 2014, Lindy Hume, artistic director of Australia's Opera Queensland staged the opera set in the party-going world of disgraced former Italian prime minister Silvio Berlusconi.

== Roles ==
Costumes for the Duke of Mantua and Gilda published by Casa Ricordi shortly after the 1851 premiere

Roles, voice types, premiere cast
Role	Voice type	Premiere cast, 11 March 1851 Conductor: Gaetano Mares
Rigoletto, the Duke's jester	baritone	Felice Varesi
Gilda, his daughter	soprano	Teresa Brambilla
Duke of Mantua	tenor	Raffaele Mirate
Sparafucile, a murderer for hire	bass	Paolo Damini
Maddalena, his sister	contralto	Annetta Casaloni
Giovanna, Gilda's Nurse	mezzo-soprano	Laura Saini
Count Ceprano	bass	Andrea Bellini
Countess Ceprano, his wife	mezzo-soprano	Luigia Morselli
Matteo Borsa, a courtier	tenor	Angelo Zuliani
Count Monterone	baritone	Feliciano Ponz
Marullo	baritone	Francesco De Kunnerth
A Court Usher	bass	Giovanni Rizzi
A Page	mezzo-soprano	Annetta Modes Lovati
Male Chorus: the Duke's courtiers and guests

== Synopsis ==
Place: Mantua
Time: the sixteenth century

The opera duration is 2 hours 45 minutes, with two intermissions.

=== Act 1 ===
Scene 1: Mantua. A magnificent hall in the ducal palace. Doors at the back open into other rooms, splendidly lit up. A crowd of lords and ladies in grand costumes are seen walking about in the rear rooms; page boys come and go. The festivities are at their height. Music is heard from offstage. The Duke and Borsa enter from a door in the back.

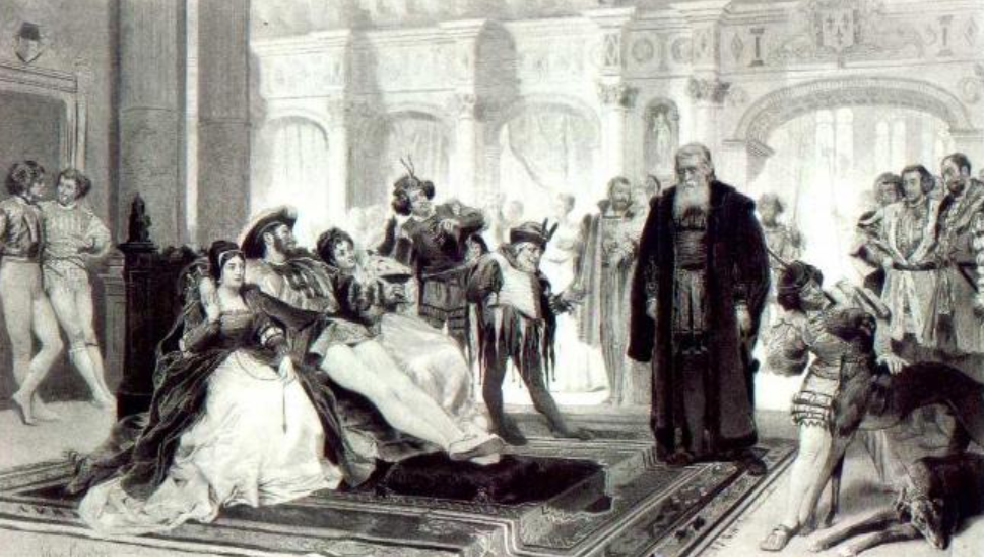
Act 1, scene 1: Victor Hugo's Le Roi s'amuse

At a ball in his palace, the Duke sings of a life of pleasure with as many women as possible, and mentions that he particularly enjoys cuckolding his courtiers: "Questa o quella" ("This woman or that"). He mentions to Borsa that he has seen an unknown beauty in church and desires to possess her, but he also wishes to seduce the Countess of Ceprano. Rigoletto, the Duke's hunchbacked court jester, mocks the husbands of the ladies to whom the Duke is paying attention, including the Count Ceprano. He humorously advises the Duke to get rid of Count Ceprano by prison, exile, or death. The Duke laughs indulgently, but Ceprano is not amused. Marullo, one of the guests at the ball, informs the courtiers that Rigoletto has a "lover", which astonishes them (Marullo is not aware that the "lover" is actually Rigoletto's daughter). The courtiers, at Ceprano's suggestion, resolve to take vengeance on Rigoletto for making fun of them. The festivities are interrupted by the arrival of the elderly Count Monterone, whose daughter the Duke had seduced. Rigoletto provokes him further by making fun of his helplessness to avenge his daughter's honor. Monterone confronts the Duke, and is immediately arrested by the Duke's guards. Before being led off to prison, Monterone curses both the Duke for the attack on his daughter and Rigoletto for having mocked his righteous anger. The curse terrifies Rigoletto, who believes the popular superstition that an old man's curse has real power.

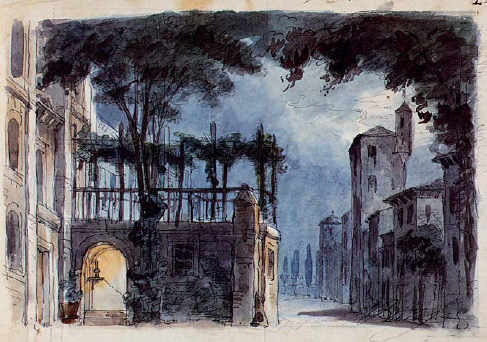
Act 1, scene 2 stage set by Giuseppe Bertoja for the world premiere of Rigoletto

Scene 2: The end of a dead-end street. On the left, a house of discreet appearance with one small courtyard surrounded by walls. In the yard there is one tall tree and a marble seat; in the wall, a door that leads to the street; above the wall, a terrace supported by arches. The second floor door opens on to the said terrace, which can also be reached by a staircase in front. To the right of the street is the very high wall of the garden and a side of the Ceprano palace. It is night.

Preoccupied with the old man's curse, Rigoletto approaches the house where he is concealing his daughter from the world and is accosted by the assassin Sparafucile, who walks up to him and offers his services. Rigoletto declines for the moment, but leaves open the possibility of hiring Sparafucile later, should the need arise. Sparafucile wanders off, after repeating his own name a few times. Rigoletto contemplates the similarities between the two of them: "Pari siamo!" ("We are alike!"); Sparafucile kills men with his sword, and Rigoletto uses "a tongue of malice" to stab his victims. Rigoletto opens a door in the wall and embraces his daughter Gilda. They greet each other warmly: "Figlia!" "Mio padre!" ("Daughter!" "My father!"). Rigoletto has been concealing his daughter from the Duke and the rest of the city, and she does not know her father's occupation. Since he has forbidden her to appear in public, she has been nowhere except to church and does not even know her own father's name.

When Rigoletto has gone, the Duke appears and overhears Gilda confess to her nurse Giovanna that she feels guilty for not having told her father about a young man she had met at the church. She says that she fell in love with him, but that she would love him even more if he were a student and poor. As she declares her love, the Duke enters, overjoyed. Gilda, alarmed, calls for Giovanna, unaware that the Duke had given her money to go away. Pretending to be a student, the Duke convinces Gilda of his love: "È il sol dell'anima" ("Love is the sunshine of the soul"). When she asks for his name, he hesitantly calls himself Gualtier Maldè. Hearing sounds and fearing that her father has returned, Gilda sends the Duke away after they quickly trade vows of love: "Addio, addio" ("Farewell, farewell"). Alone, Gilda meditates on her love for the Duke, who she believes is a student: "Gualtier Maldè!... Caro nome che il mio cor" ("Dearest name").

Later, Rigoletto returns: "Riedo!... perché?" ("I've returned!... why?"), while the hostile courtiers outside the walled garden (believing Gilda to be the jester's mistress, unaware she is his daughter) get ready to abduct the helpless girl. They tell Rigoletto that they are actually abducting the Countess Ceprano. He sees that they are masked and asks for a mask for himself; while they are tying the mask onto his face, they also blindfold him. Blindfolded and deceived, he holds the ladder steady while they climb up to Gilda's room: Chorus: "Zitti, zitti" ("Softly, softly"). With her father's unknowing assistance Gilda is carried away by the courtiers. Left alone, Rigoletto removes his mask and blindfold, and realizes that it was in fact Gilda who was carried away. He collapses in despair, remembering the old man's curse.

=== Act 2 ===
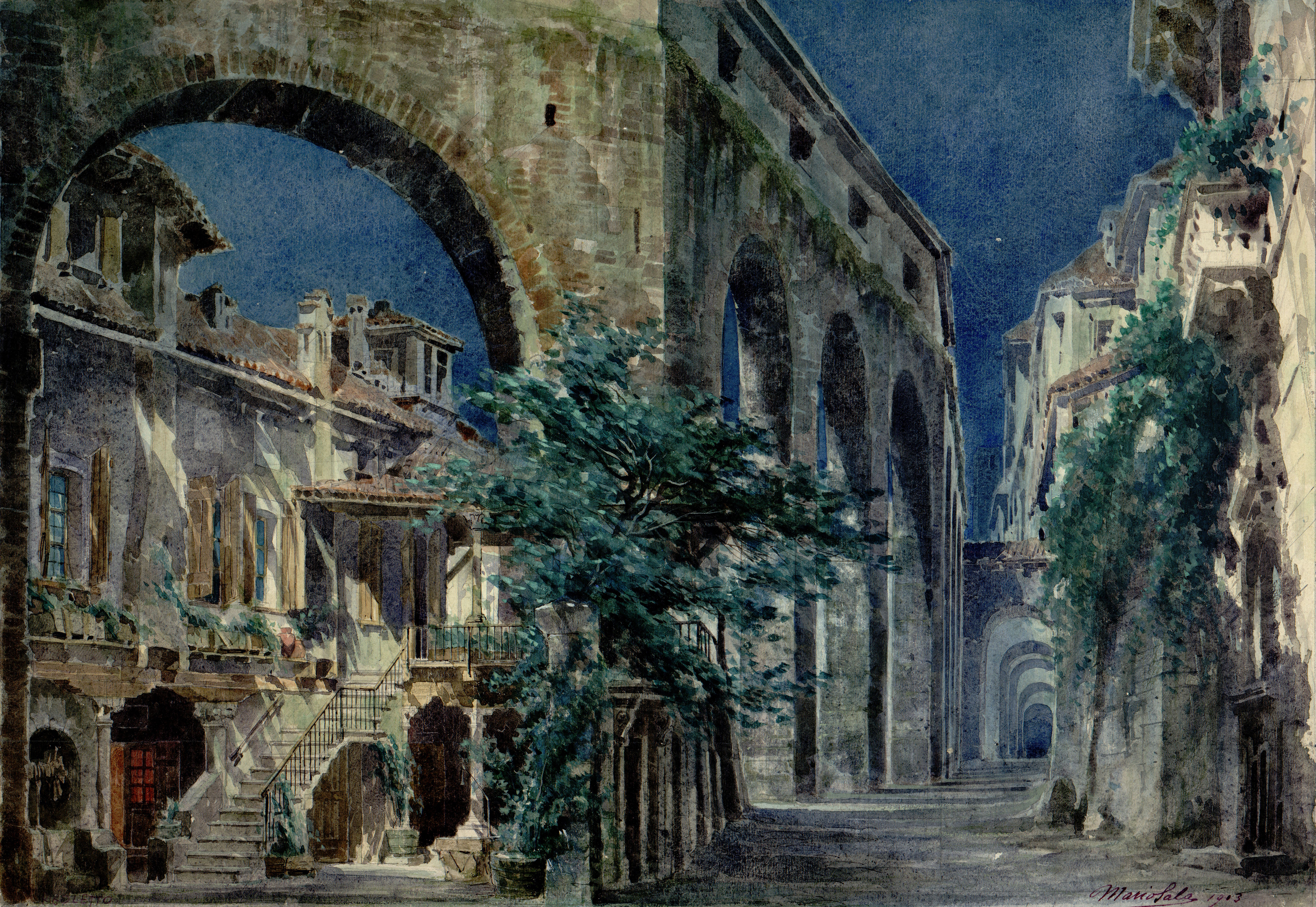
Set design for Rigoletto act 1, scene 2 (1903)

"Cortigiani, vil razza dannata""
Sung by Titta Ruffo

A room in the ducal palace. There are doors on both sides as well as a larger one at the far end by the sides of which hang full length portraits of the Duke and his wife. There is one high-backed chair at a table covered with velvet and other furnishings.

The Duke is concerned that Gilda has disappeared: "Ella mi fu rapita!" ("She was stolen from me!") and "Parmi veder le lagrime" ("I seem to see tears"). The courtiers then enter and inform him that they have captured Rigoletto's mistress: Chorus: "Scorrendo uniti" ("We went together at nightfall"). By their description, he recognizes it to be Gilda and rushes off to the room where she is held: "Possente amor mi chiama" ("Mighty love beckons me"). Rigoletto enters singing and feigning nonchalance, but also looking anxiously for any trace of Gilda, who he fears may have fallen into the hands of the Duke. The courtiers pretend not to notice his anxiety, but quietly laugh at him with each other. A page arrives with a message from the Duke's wife – the Duchess wishes to speak to her husband – but the courtiers reply suggestively that the Duke cannot be disturbed at the moment. Rigoletto realizes this must mean that Gilda is with the Duke. To the courtiers' surprise, he reveals that Gilda is his daughter. He first demands, then tearfully pleads with the courtiers to return her to him: "Cortigiani, vil razza dannata" ("Accursed race of courtiers"). Rigoletto attempts to run into the room in which Gilda is being held, but the courtiers block his way. After a time, Gilda enters, and Rigoletto orders the courtiers to leave him alone with her. The courtiers leave the room, believing Rigoletto has gone mad. Gilda describes to her father what has happened to her in the palace: "Tutte le feste al tempio" ("On all the holy days") and he attempts to console her. Monterone is led across the room on the way to prison and pauses in front of the portrait of the Duke to regret that his curse on the libertine has had no effect. As the guards lead Monterone away, Rigoletto mutters that the old man is mistaken; he, Rigoletto, the dishonored buffoon, shall make thunder and lightning rain from heaven onto the offender's head. He repeats this vow as Gilda pleads for mercy for her lover the Duke: Duet: "Sì! Vendetta, tremenda vendetta!" ("Yes! Revenge, terrible revenge!").

=== Act 3 ===
The right bank of the river Mincio. On the left is a two-story house, half ruined. Through a large arch on the ground floor a rustic tavern can be seen as well as a rough stone staircase that leads to an attic room with a small bed which is in full view as there are no shutters. In the wall downstairs that faces the street is a door that opens to the inside. The wall is so full of holes and cracks that everything that happens inside is easily seen from the exterior. At the back of the stage are deserted areas by the river which flows behind a parapet that has half collapsed into ruins. Beyond the river is Mantua. It is night. Gilda and Rigoletto, both uneasy, are standing in the road; Sparafucile is seated at a table in the tavern.

"La donna è mobile"
Enrico Caruso singing "La donna è mobile" (C. 1906)

"Bella figlia dell'amore"
Enrico Caruso, Bessie Abott, Louise Homer and Antonio Scotti's 1907 Victor Records recording

A portion of Sparafucile's house is seen, with two rooms open to the view of the audience. Rigoletto and Gilda arrive outside. The Duke's voice can be heard from inside, singing "La donna è mobile" ("Woman is fickle"). Sparafucile's sister, Maddalena, has lured him to the house. Rigoletto and Gilda listen from outside as the Duke flirts with Maddalena. Gilda laments that the Duke is unfaithful; Rigoletto assures her that he is arranging revenge: "Bella figlia dell'amore" ("Beautiful daughter of love").

Rigoletto orders Gilda to put on a man's clothes to prepare to leave for Verona and tells her that he plans to follow later. After she leaves, he completes his bargain with the assassin, who is ready to murder his guest for 20 scudi. Rigoletto then withdraws.

With falling darkness, a thunderstorm approaches and the Duke decides to spend the rest of the night in the house. Sparafucile directs him to the upstairs sleeping quarters, resolving to kill him in his sleep.

Gilda, who still loves the Duke despite knowing him to be unfaithful, returns dressed as a man and stands outside the house. Maddalena, who is smitten with the Duke, begs Sparafucile to spare his life: "È amabile invero cotal giovinotto/ Ah, più non ragiono!". Sparafucile, a man of his word, is reluctant but promises her that if by midnight another victim can be found, he will kill the other instead of the Duke. Gilda, overhearing this exchange, resolves to sacrifice herself for the Duke, and enters the house: "Trio: Se pria ch'abbia il mezzo la notte toccato". Sparafucile stabs her and she collapses, mortally wounded.

At midnight, when Rigoletto arrives with money, he receives a corpse wrapped in a sack, and rejoices in his triumph. Weighting it with stones, he is about to cast the sack into the river when he hears the voice of the Duke, sleepily singing a reprise of his "La donna è mobile" aria. Bewildered, Rigoletto opens the sack and, to his despair, discovers his dying daughter. For a moment, she revives and declares she is glad to die for her beloved: "V'ho ingannato" ("Father, I deceived you"). She dies in his arms. Rigoletto cries out in horror ("La maledizione!" ("The curse!")) because Count Monterone's curse has been fulfilled.

== Instrumentation ==
The orchestra calls for 2 flutes (Flute 2 doubles piccolo), 2 oboes (Oboe 2 doubles English horn), 2 clarinets, 2 bassoons, 4 horns in E♭, D, C, A♭, G, and F, 2 trumpets in C, D, and E♭, 3 trombones, cimbasso, timpani, bass drum and cymbals, strings

- Offstage: Banda, bass drum, 2 bells, thunder machine
- Onstage: Violins I and II, violas, and contrabasses

== Music ==
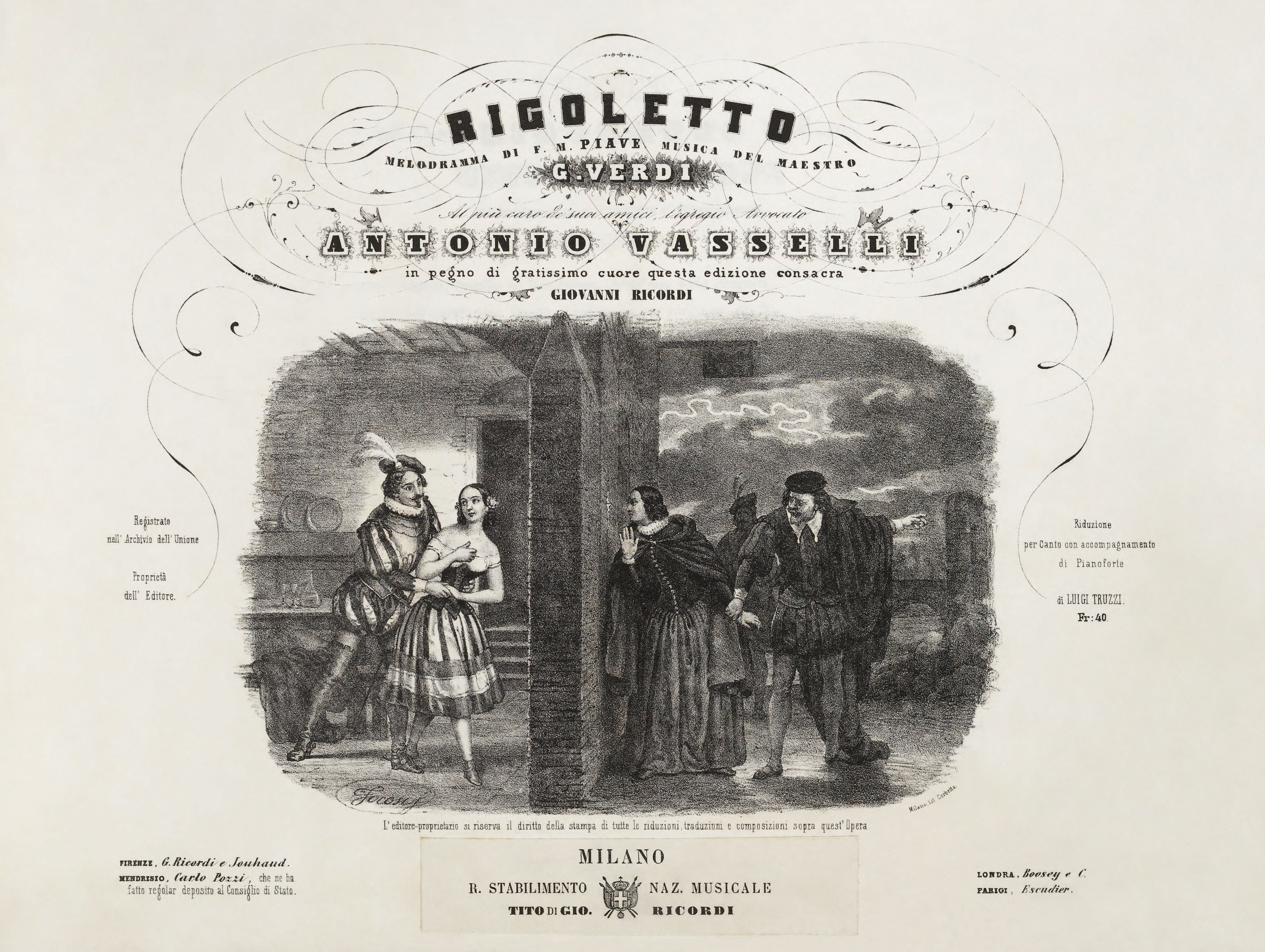
"Bella figlia dell'amore" scene, depicted by Roberto Focosi in an early edition of the vocal score

The short orchestral preludio is based on the theme of the curse, intoned quietly on brass at first and building in intensity until it bursts into a passionate outcry by the full orchestra, subsiding once more and ending with repeated drum rolls alternating with brass, cumulatively increasing in volume to come to a somber conclusion. At curtain rise, great contrast is immediately felt as jolly dance music is played by an offstage band while the Duke and his courtiers have a lighthearted conversation. The Duke sings the cynical "Questa o quella" to a flippant tune and then further contrast is again achieved as he attempts to seduce the Countess Ceprano while the strings of a chamber orchestra onstage play an elegant minuet. The off stage dance music resumes as an ensemble builds between Rigoletto, the angry courtiers and the Duke, interrupted by the furious entry of Monterone. Slithery effects in the strings accompany Rigoletto as he brutally mocks the old man, who responds with his curse, leading to a final dramatic ensemble.

In its great variety of tone and texture, its use of instrumental resources (the orchestra in the pit, an offstage band, and a chamber ensemble of strings on the stage), its dramatic pacing and the way the music is continuous rather than consisting of one "number" after another, this concise opening scene is unprecedented in Italian opera.

The duet between Rigoletto and Sparafucile that opens the second scene of the first act is also unprecedented in its structure, being a free-ranging dialogue with melodies not in the voices but in the orchestra, on a solo cello, solo bass, and low woodwinds to create a distinctive sinister atmosphere.

The famous quartet in act three is actually a double duet with each of the characters given a musical identity—the ardent wooing of the Duke, with the main melody, as Maddalena laughingly puts him off, while outside Gilda has a sobbing figure in her vocal line and her father implacably urges revenge.

Victor Hugo resented his play, which had been banned in France, being transformed into an Italian opera and considered it plagiarism (there were no copyright restrictions against this at the time). When Hugo attended a performance of the opera in Paris, however, he marveled at the way Verdi's music in the quartet allowed the emotions of the four different characters to be heard together and yet distinguished clearly from each other at the same time and wished that he could achieve such an effect in a spoken drama.

The section following the quartet, marked "Scena e Terzetto Tempesta" (scene and storm trio) is also, as Julian Budden has written,"without any antecedent". Very different from the storm music that can be heard in Rossini's Il barbiere di Siviglia or La Cenerentola, that of the storm in Rigoletto is not an interlude between acts or scenes, but is totally integrated into the unfolding of the plot, with its strings in the bass register, its interventions of oboe and piccolo, and especially the male chorus behind the scenes humming through closed mouths to create the sound of the wind, a completely original effect. Composer and professor of experimental music Dieter Schnebel (1930–2018) wrote of this scene

The central storm scene is, so to speak, a film with sound, whose moving images show an exterior and interior drama. The furtive encounters between people in the darkness, irregularly broken by lightning, are exposed by the empty fifths, the tremolos of strings, the brief breakthroughs of the wind instruments, the thunderclaps and the sinister sighs of the chorus, which express as well an external process that is internal: death arrives with thunderclaps. The music always passes in this scene from jerky recitatives to fluid arias...

Musicologist Julian Budden regards the opera as "revolutionary", just as Beethoven' Eroica Symphony was: "the barriers between formal melody and recitative are down as never before. In the whole opera, there is only one conventional double aria [...and there are...] no concerted act finales." Verdi used that same word—"revolutionary"—in a letter to Piave, and Budden also refers to a letter which Verdi wrote in 1852 in which the composer states that "I conceived Rigoletto almost without arias, without finales but only an unending string of duets."

Budden's conclusions about this opera and its place in Verdi's output are summed up by noting that:

Just after 1850 at the age of 38 Verdi closed the door on a period of Italian opera with Rigoletto. The so-called ottocento in music is finished. Verdi will continue to draw on certain of its forms for the next few operas, but in a totally new spirit.

== Critical reception ==
Although immensely successful with audiences from the beginning, many critics in various countries condemned the work for its dark and bitterly tragic plot combined with a succession of mere popular tunes, as they thought of the music. After the first performance in Venice in 1851 the Gazzetta ufficiale di Venezia deplored the fact that in his opinion the libretto was inspired by "the Satanic school" and Verdi and Piave had sought beauty from the "deformed and repulsive".

Typical of critical reaction in Britain, Austria and Germany was the review in the Frankfurter Nachrichten of 24 July 1859: "It is well known that this shoddy work presents all the vices and virtues of Verdi's music: light music, pleasant dance rhythms for frightful scenes; that death and corruption are represented as in all the works of this composer by galops and party favours."

In the second half of the twentieth century and into the twenty-first, Rigoletto has received high praise even from avant-garde and experimental composers such as Luigi Dallapiccola, Luciano Berio and Ernst Krenek. Igor Stravinsky wrote "I say that in the aria 'La donna è mobile', for example, which the elite thinks only brilliant and superficial, there is more substance and feeling than in the whole of Wagner's Ring cycle."

== Recordings and adaptations ==
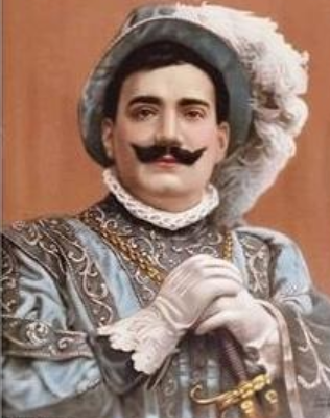
Enrico Caruso in the role of the Duke

There have been dozens of commercial recordings of Rigoletto. The earliest ones include the 1912 performance in French with François Ruhlmann conducting the orchestra and chorus of the Opéra Comique (Pathé) and the 1916 performance in Italian with Lorenzo Molajoli conducting the orchestra and chorus of La Scala (Columbia Records). The first LP edition of Rigoletto (also the first opera recording on LP) was released by RCA Victor in 1950 conducted by Renato Cellini and featured Leonard Warren in the title role. The opera has also been recorded in German with Wilhelm Schüchter conducting the orchestra and chorus of the Berlin State Opera in a 1953 recording for EMI Records and in English with Mark Elder conducting the orchestra and chorus of the English National Opera in a 1983 recording for EMI.

In the 21st century there have been several live performances released on DVD including a 2001 performance from London's Royal Opera House with Paolo Gavanelli as Rigoletto and Marcelo Álvarez as the Duke (BBC/Opus Arte) and a 2006 performance at the Opernhaus Zürich with Leo Nucci as Rigoletto and Piotr Beczała as The Duke (ArtHaus Musik). The Duke of Mantua's arias, particularly "La donna è mobile" and "Questa o quella", have long been showcases for the tenor voice and appear on numerous recital discs. Amongst Enrico Caruso's earliest recordings are both these arias, recorded with piano accompaniment in 1902 and again in 1908 with orchestra. Luciano Pavarotti, who recorded the arias for several recital discs, also sings the role of the Duke on three complete studio recordings of the opera: Decca (1971) conducted by Richard Bonynge; Decca (1989) conducted by Riccardo Chailly and Deutsche Grammophon (1993) conducted by James Levine.

Rigoletto has been a popular subject for movies since the silent film era. On 15 April 1923, Lee de Forest presented 18 short films in his sound-on-film process Phonofilm, including an excerpt of act 2 of Rigoletto with Eva Leoni and Company. One of the most famous films based on the opera is the 1987 film by Jean-Pierre Ponnelle starring Pavarotti as The Duke and Ingvar Wixell as Rigoletto. Jonathan Miller reimagined Rigoletto in 1950s Little Italy, the "world of the godfather and the Mafia". His reimagining was well-received.

Some film versions are based on the opera's plot, but do not use Verdi's music. Curtiss Clayton's 2003 film Rick, set in modern-day New York, has a plot based on Rigoletto, but apart from "La donna è mobile" heard in the background during a restaurant scene, does not include any other music from the opera. In the 21st century, the opera was filmed as Giuseppe Verdi's Rigoletto Story directed by Vittorio Sgarbi with costumes by Vivienne Westwood. First screened at the Venice Biennale in 2004, it subsequently received two Grammy nominations. In September 2010, RAI Television filmed the opera on location in Mantua with the court scenes taking place in the Palazzo Te. The film faithfully followed Verdi's original specification for the action to take place over two days, and each act was performed at the time of day indicated in the libretto. Broadcast live to 148 countries, the film starred Plácido Domingo in the title role, and Vittorio Grigolo as The Duke. The plot of the film Quartet revolves around the quartet "Bella figlia dell'amore", with which the film concludes.

Adaptations of the opera's music include Liszt's Rigoletto Paraphrase, a piano transcription of "Bella figlia dell'amore", a Fantasia on Rigoletto (Op. 82) by Sigismond Thalberg which was published in Paris in the 1860s, Josef Strauss Neue Melodien – Quadrille (Op. 254) based on motives from Rigoletto, Il Trovatore, La Traviata, and other operas from Bellini and Donizetti and Mats Lidström's Rigoletto Fantasy from 2009.

== Notes and references ==
Notes

Sources

- Budden, Julian (1984). The Operas of Verdi. Vol. 1: From Oberto to Rigoletto. London: Cassell. ISBN 0-304-31058-1.
- Casaglia, Gherardo (2005). "Rigoletto". L'Almanacco di Gherardo Casaglia (in Italian).
- Downes, Olin (1918). The Lure of Music: Depicting the Human Side of Great Composers. New York and London: Harper & Brothers – via Internet Archive.
- Hugo, Adèle (1863). Victor Hugo. Translated by Charles Edwin Wilbour. New York: Carleton.
- Kimbell, David (1985). Verdi in the Age of Italian Romanticism. Cambridge: Cambridge University Press Archive. ISBN 0-521-31678-2.
- Kimbell, David (2001). Holden, Amanda (ed.). The New Penguin Opera Guide. New York: Penguin Putnam. ISBN 0-14-029312-4.
- Loomis, George (29 June 2005). "The Peter Jonas touch: A home for 'interpretive' opera in Munich". International Herald Tribune. Archived from the original on 10 June 2014 – via HighBeam Research.
- Martin, George Whitney (2011). Verdi in America: Oberto Through Rigoletto. Rochester: University of Rochester Press. ISBN 978-1-58046-388-1.
- Melitz, Leo (1913). The Opera Goer's Complete Guide. New York: Dodd, Mead.
- O'Connor, John (23 February 1989). "Jonathan Miller's Mafia Rigoletto". The New York Times.
- Ozorio, Anne (8 September 2010). "Unique Rigoletto live from Mantua". Opera Today.
- Parker, Roger (2001). "Rigoletto". In Sadie, Stanley; Tyrrell, John (eds.). The New Grove Dictionary of Music and Musicians (2nd ed.). London: Macmillan. ISBN 978-1-56159-239-5.
- Phillips-Matz, Mary Jane (1993). Verdi: A Biography. London & New York: Oxford University Press. ISBN 0-19-313204-4.
