= Imperial Orchestra =

New Orleans dance band

The Imperial Orchestra was a New Orleans dance band active from around 1900 or 1901 to around 1912.

Led by Manuel Perez, who had joined the Onward Brass Band in 1900 (and would go on to lead it from 1903 until it disbanded in 1930), the Imperial Orchestra was admired by early jazz musicians for its polished performances, with the group playing from written arrangements.

Members of the ensemble, some of whom also performed with the [Onward Brass Band, at various times included clarinetists Sydney Bechet, Lorenzo Tio, George Baquet, Big Eye Nelson and Alphonse Picou, violinists Armand Piron and James A. Palao, trombonist George Filhe, double bass player Billy Marrero, baritone horn player Adolphe Alexander, Sr., and drummer Jean Vigne.
