= La donna è mobile =

Tenor aria from Verdi's opera Rigoletto

"La donna è mobile" (pronounced [la ˈdɔnna ˌɛ mˈmɔːbile]; "Woman is fickle") is the Duke of Mantua's canzone from the beginning of act 3 of Giuseppe Verdi's opera Rigoletto (1851). The canzone is famous as a showcase for tenors. Raffaele Mirate's performance of the bravura aria at the opera's 1851 premiere was hailed as the highlight of the evening. Before the opera's first public performance in Venice, "La donna è mobile" was rehearsed under tight secrecy, as the aria proved to be incredibly catchy and soon after its premiere it became popular to sing among Venetian gondoliers.

As the opera progresses, the reprise of the tune in the following scenes contributes to Rigoletto's confusion as he realizes from the sound of the Duke's lively voice coming from the tavern (offstage) that the body in the sack over which he had grimly triumphed was not that of the Duke after all; Rigoletto had paid Sparafucile, an assassin, to kill the Duke, but Sparafucile had deceived Rigoletto by indiscriminately killing Gilda, Rigoletto's beloved daughter, instead.

== Music ==
"La donna è mobile"
Performed by Enrico Caruso in 1908

"La donna è mobile" (2:42)
Javier Camarena, Gran Teatre del Liceu (2017)

The aria is in the key of B major with a time signature of 3/8 and a tempo mark of allegretto. The vocal range extends from F♯_{3} to B_{4} with a tessitura from F♯_{3} to F♯_{4}. Eight bars form the orchestral introduction, followed by a one-bar general rest. Each verse and the refrain covers eight bars; the whole aria is 87 bars long.

The almost comical-sounding theme of "La donna è mobile" is introduced immediately. The theme is repeated several times in the approximately two to three minutes it takes to perform the aria, but with the important—and obvious—omission of the last bar. This has the effect of driving the music forward as it creates the impression of being incomplete and unresolved, which it is, ending not on the tonic (B) or dominant (F♯) but on the submediant (G♯). Once the Duke has finished singing, however, the theme is once again repeated; this time, it includes the last—and conclusive—bar and finally resolves to the tonic of B major. The song is in strophic form with an orchestral ritornello.

== Libretto ==
The lyrics are based on a phrase by King Francis I of France, Souvent femme varie, bien fol qui s'y fie. [Women are fickle, and who trusts them is a fool.], that he, deceived by one of his numerous mistresses, reputedly engraved on a window pane. Victor Hugo used this phrase verbatim in his play Le roi s'amuse, on which Rigoletto is based. Fleury François Richard depicted in an 1804 oil painting Francis engraving the lines.

La donna è mobile
Qual piuma al vento,
muta d'accento
e di pensiero.

Sempre un amabile,
leggiadro viso,
in pianto o in riso,
è menzognero.

Refrain
La donna è mobil'.
Qual piuma al vento,
muta d'accento
e di pensier'!

È sempre misero
chi a lei s'affida,
chi le confida
mal cauto il cuore!

Pur mai non sentesi
felice appieno
chi su quel seno
non liba amore!

Refrain
La donna è mobil'
Qual piuma al vento,
muta d'accento
e di pensier'!

Woman is flighty.
Like a feather in the wind,
she changes in voice
and in thought.

Always a lovely,
pretty face,
in tears or in laughter,
it is untrue.

Refrain
Woman is fickle.
Like a feather in the wind,
she changes her words
and her thoughts!

Always miserable
is he who trusts her,
he who confides in her
his unwary heart!

Yet one never feels
fully happy
who from that bosom
does not drink love!

Refrain
Woman is fickle.
Like a feather in the wind,
she changes her words,
and her thoughts!

Poetic adaptation
Plume in the summerwind
Waywardly playing
Ne'er one way swaying
Each whim obeying;

Thus heart of womankind
Ev'ry way bendeth,
Woe who dependeth
On joy she spendeth!

Refrain
Yes, heart of woman
Ev'ry way bendeth
Woe who dependeth
On joy she spends.

Sorrow and misery
Follow her smiling,
Fond hearts beguiling,
falsehood assoiling!

Yet all felicity
Is her bestowing,
No joy worth knowing
Is there but wooing.

Refrain
Yes, heart of woman
Ev'ry way bendeth
Woe who dependeth
On joy she spends.

== In popular culture ==
The tune has been used in popular culture for a long time and for many occasions and purposes. Verdi knew that he had written a catchy tune, so he provided the score to the singer at the premiere, Raffaele Mirate, only shortly before the premiere and had him swear not to sing or whistle the song outside rehearsals. And indeed, people sang the tune the next day in the streets. Early on, it became a barrel organ staple and was later used extensively in television advertisements. Football fans chanted new words to the tune of the melody.

When all of Italy was under lockdown due to the COVID-19 pandemic, a video of opera singer Maurizio Marchini performing "La donna è mobile" and other arias and songs from his balcony in Florence went viral.
