= Pickens Hall =

- U.S. National Register of Historic Places
- Location within New York Location within the United States
- Location: 83 State St., Heuvelton, New York
- Coordinates: 44°37′10″N 75°24′22″W
- Area: less than one acre
- Built: 1858
- Architectural style: Italianate
- NRHP reference No.: 04001205
- Added to NRHP: October 27, 2004

Pickens Hall was a vaudeville venue at Heuvelton in St. Lawrence County, New York. It was built in 1858 and is a three-story, rectangular stone building, 65 feet wide and 74 feet deep. It is an Italianate style building with commercial space on the first floor and office/storage rooms on the second floor. There is a General Store on the first floor, function space on the second, and a newly restored Opera House on the third floor which serves as a venue for various performances. The $2.75 million restoration project just received an "Excellence in Historic Preservation" award from the Preservation League of NY State.

It is listed on the National Register of Historic Places in 2004.

In 2007 The Heuvelton Historical Association received a $50,000 state grant to restore Pickens Hall which is now open as Pickens General Store.
