= Choi Seung-yeon =

South Korean CrossFitter (born 1999)

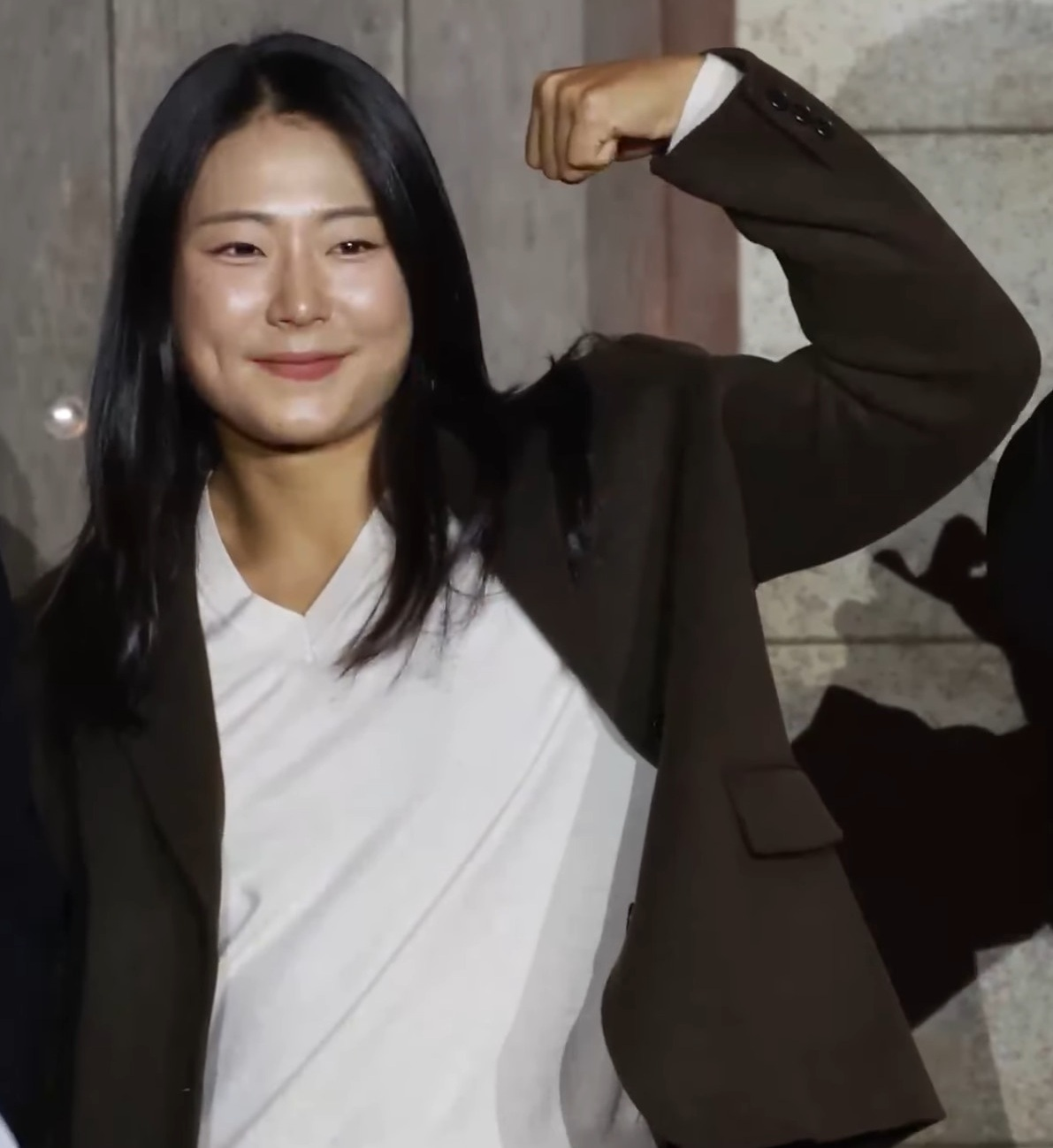
- Choi in October 2025 for Physical: Asia

Personal information
- Native name: Korean: 최승연
- Nationality: South Korea
- Born: 17 April 1999 (age 27) Jeju Province, South Korea
- Height: 1.68 m (5 ft 6 in)
- Weight: 155 lb (70 kg)

Choi Seung-yeon (Korean: 최승연; born April 17, 1999) is a South Korean CrossFitter, YouTuber and participant in the Netflix's show Physical: Asia.

== Biography ==
Choi was born on April 17, 1999 in Jeju Island, South Korea.

She began training in CrossFit at 18 years old.

== Crossfit career ==
In 2018, Choi competed in the 2018 CrossFit Open, her first crossfit competition, and placed 13th for the women's division in South Korea, 64th in the women's division for the Asia region, and then 4822nd for the women's division worldwide. The next year, Choi placed 8th overall for the women's division in South Korea at the 2019 CrossFit Open. At the 2020 CrossFit Open, Choi placed 4th in the women's division in South Korea and 740th for the women's division worldwide.

In 2021, Choi competed in the 2021 CrossFit Open and was 1st in the women's division for South Korea, 1st for the women's division in the Asia region, and then 44th for the women's division for South Korea worldwide. Choi qualified for the CrossFit Asia Invitational Semifinal and came in 2nd in the women's division. Choi was the only athlete from South Korea to qualify for the 2021 CrossFit Games in Madison, Wisconsin. She took 34th for the women's division at the 2021 CrossFit Games.

In 2022, Choi competed at the 2022 CrossFit Open and placed 1st in the women's division for South Korea and 3rd in the women's division for the Asia region. Choi came in 26th at the 2022 CrossFit Games.

In 2023, Choi did not compete in the 2023 CrossFit Open or 2023 CrossFit Games due to a shoulder injury.

On February 4, 2024, Choi started her YouTube account where she posts workout videos and vlogs about her crossfit competitions. In August 2024, Choi came in 24th at the 2024 CrossFit Games.

In April 2025, Choi placed 3rd at Wodland Fest and qualified for the 2025 CrossFit Games In August of that year, Choi came in 25th at the 2025 CrossFit Games. In that same year, Choi participated as a member of Team Korea in Netflix's show Physical: Asia, which premiered on October 28, 2025. Choi's team members were Kim Dong-hyun, Amotti, Jang Eun-sil, Kim Min-jae, and Yun Sung-bin

Choi has been affiliated with CrossFit Limelight gym since 2021.

== Filmography ==
=== Web shows ===
Year	Title	Role	Notes	Ref.
2025	Physical: Asia	Contestant	Netflix	
