= Bayarsaikhan =

Bayarsaikhan is a Mongolian surname. Notable people with the surname include:

- Gana Bayarsaikhan (fl. 2014), Mongolian actress and model
- Namjilyn Bayarsaikhan (born 1965), Mongolian boxer
- Orkhonbayar Bayarsaikhan (born 1998), Mongolian wrestler
