= Kim Min-ji (hurdler) =

South Korean athlete (born 1996)

Kim Min-gee
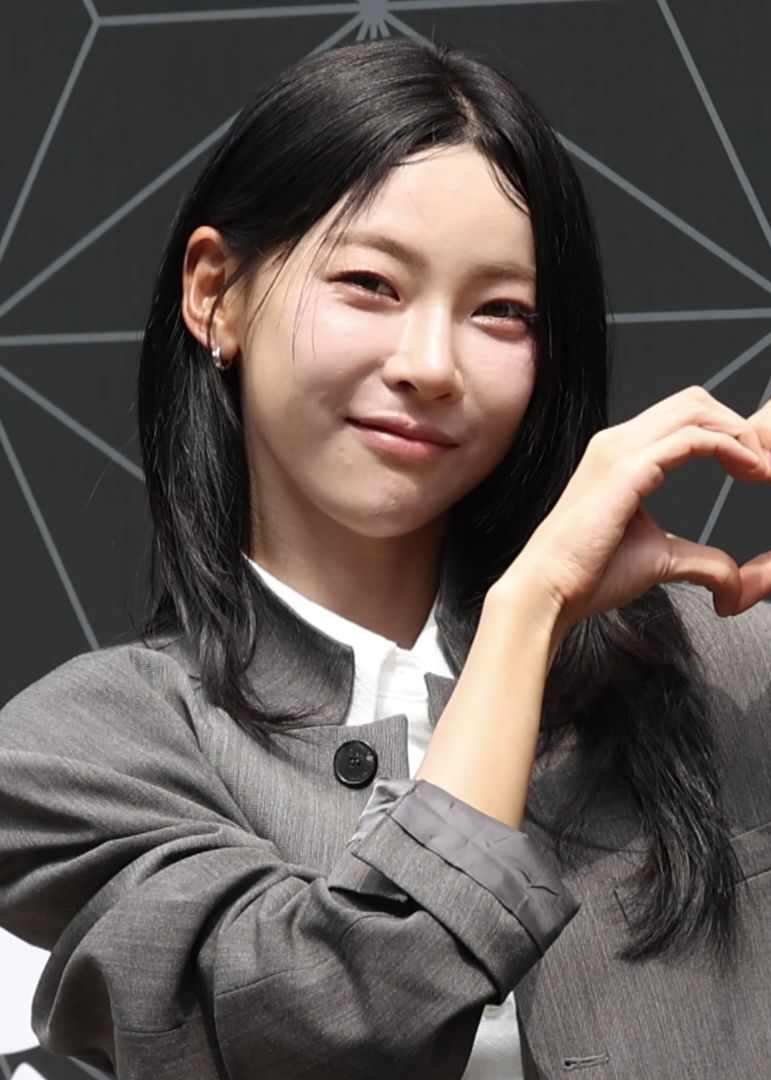
- Kim in June 2026

Personal information
- Nationality: South Korean
- Born: April 5, 1996 (age 30) Goesan County, North Chungcheong, South Korea
- Height: 173 cm (5 ft 8 in)
- Weight: 54 kg (119 lb)

Korean name
- Hangul: 김민지
- RR: Gim Minji
- MR: Kim Minji

Sport
- Sport: Athletics
- Events: 400 metres, 400 metres hurdles
- Club: Hwaseong City Hall (2024–present)
- Team: Jincheon County Office (2019–2023)

Kim Min-gee (Korean: 김민지; born April 5, 1996) is a South Korean track and field athlete and media personality. Specializing in the 400-meter sprint and 400-meter hurdles, she earned the nicknames "Karina of Track and Field" and the "track and field goddess". Since 2023, she has successfully transitioned into broadcasting, appearing on popular variety programs such as Kick a Goal and Single's Inferno 5.

== Early life and education ==
Kim was born on April 5, 1996, in Goesan County, North Chungcheong Province, South Korea. She is the middle child of four siblings (two older sisters and one younger brother). She began her athletic career in the first year of middle school at the recommendation of her physical education teacher. She graduated from Chungbuk Sports High School and later attended Changwon National University, where she earned a bachelor's degree in physical education. She subsequently completed a master's degree in physical education at Inha University's Graduate School of Education.

== Athletic career ==
Kim competed primarily in the 400m and 400m hurdles. Her first major breakthrough occurred in 2014 when she won the 400-meter hurdles at the 43rd Spring National Middle and High School Athletics Championships. During her collegiate years, she was a dominant force, winning the 400m title at the National Sports Festival four times (2014, 2017, 2018 and 2019).

In 2018, she also won the 400 metres at the 73rd National University Athletics Championships and the 72nd National Inter-University Track and Field Championships, and placed first in the 400 metres hurdles at the 47th National Individual Athletics Championships.

In 2020, despite a reduced competition schedule due to the COVID-19 pandemic, she remained active in domestic events. She finished second in the 400 metres at the 49th National Individual Athletics Championships, and was part of the gold-medal-winning 4 × 400 metres mixed relay team at the 48th KBS Cup National Athletics Championships.

She has also participated in football- and baseball-related activities. In 2022, she threw a ceremonial first pitch at a KBO League game between the Hanwha Eagles and the NC Dinos in Daejeon.

Kim represented Jincheon County from 2019 to 2023 before joining Hwaseong City Hall in 2024 on a two-year contract. Her later career has been affected by an Achilles tendon injury sustained in late 2023. During her first season with Hwaseong City Hall in 2024, Kim was eliminated in the heats of the women’s 400 metres at the KTFL National Corporate Track and Field Championships. Later that year, she was appointed as a public relations ambassador and social contribution ambassador for Hwaseong City.

== Entertainment career ==
Kim became widely known in July 2022 after a video of her competing at a national athletics event without her usual goggles spread online. In October 2022, she signed an exclusive management contract with Bonboo Entertainment, which manages athletes and sports personalities.

She later began appearing regularly on South Korean television. In 2023, she joined the SBS sports-variety program Kick a Goal as a member of FC National Family, where she played as a sprinter-type player. She also appeared in multiple seasons of Kick a Goal (seasons 4–6), participated in both editions of the SBS Cup, and made guest appearances on Knowing Bros and King of Masked Singer.

In 2024, Kim appeared as a contestant on TV Chosun's physical competition program King of Survival: Tribal War.

In late 2025, she joined Channel A's baseball variety program Baseball Queen.

In January 2026, she participated in the fifth season of the reality dating show Single's Inferno, which led to increased public recognition.

== Filmography ==
=== Television show ===
Year	Title	Network / Platform	Role	Notes	Ref.
2022	Idol Star Athletics Championships	MBC	Commentator		
2023–present	Kick a Goal	SBS	Cast member		
2024	King of Survival: Tribal War	TV Chosun	Contestant		
2025	Baseball Queen	Channel A	Cast member		
2026	Single's Inferno	Netflix	Contestant	Season 5	
