= Physical: Asia =

South Korean reality television series

- Also known as: Physical: 100 – Season 3
- Hangul: 피지컬: 아시아
- RR: Pijikeol: Asia
- MR: P'ijik'ŏl: Asia
- Genre: Reality competition; Survival; Variety show
- Created by: Jang Ho-gi
- Written by: Kang Sook-kyuno
- Directed by: Jang Ho-gi
- Music by: Kim Sung-soo
- Country of origin: South Korea
- Original languages: Korean; English; Mongolian; Japanese; Turkish; Filipino; Indonesian; Thai
- No. of episodes: 12

Production
- Executive producer: Choi Sung-yoon
- Producers: Yeom Hye-jung; Choi Ah-hyun; Heo Jung-min
- Cinematography: Jung Jang-soo; Kim Chan-hong; Park Jae-young
- Editor: Nam Na-yeong
- Running time: 56–106 minutes
- Production company: Teo

Original release
- Network: Netflix
- Release: October 28 – November 18, 2025

Related
- Physical: 100; Physical 100: USA; Physical 100: Italy

Physical: Asia (Korean: 피지컬: 아시아) is a South Korean reality competition series on Netflix. It is a spin-off of Physical: 100 and was announced following the conclusion of the second season. The series featured 48 contestants from eight countries across the Asia-Pacific. They competed for the title of the ideal physique and a grand prize of ₩1 billion (approximately US$700,000 as of October 2025). Following the announcement of Physical: Asia, the franchise's expansion continued with plans for local adaptations in other territories, including the United States and Italy.

A spin-off of the show, Physical: Welcome to Mongolia, was released in the beginning of 2026, featuring Korean and Mongolian team members reuniting in Mongolia for travel.

== Format ==
Following the format of the original series, competitors from across Asia, all known for their well-developed physical attributes and physique, go head-to-head in various individual and team challenges, or 'quests' of strength, balance, agility, endurance, willpower and strategy. The competition is formatted like a tournament. After each quest, participants are eliminated until only one team remains to win a grand cash prize.

Every participant has a plaster cast of their torso on the set; when they are eliminated, they must destroy the cast with a sledgehammer, a signature element of the original series.

== Participants ==
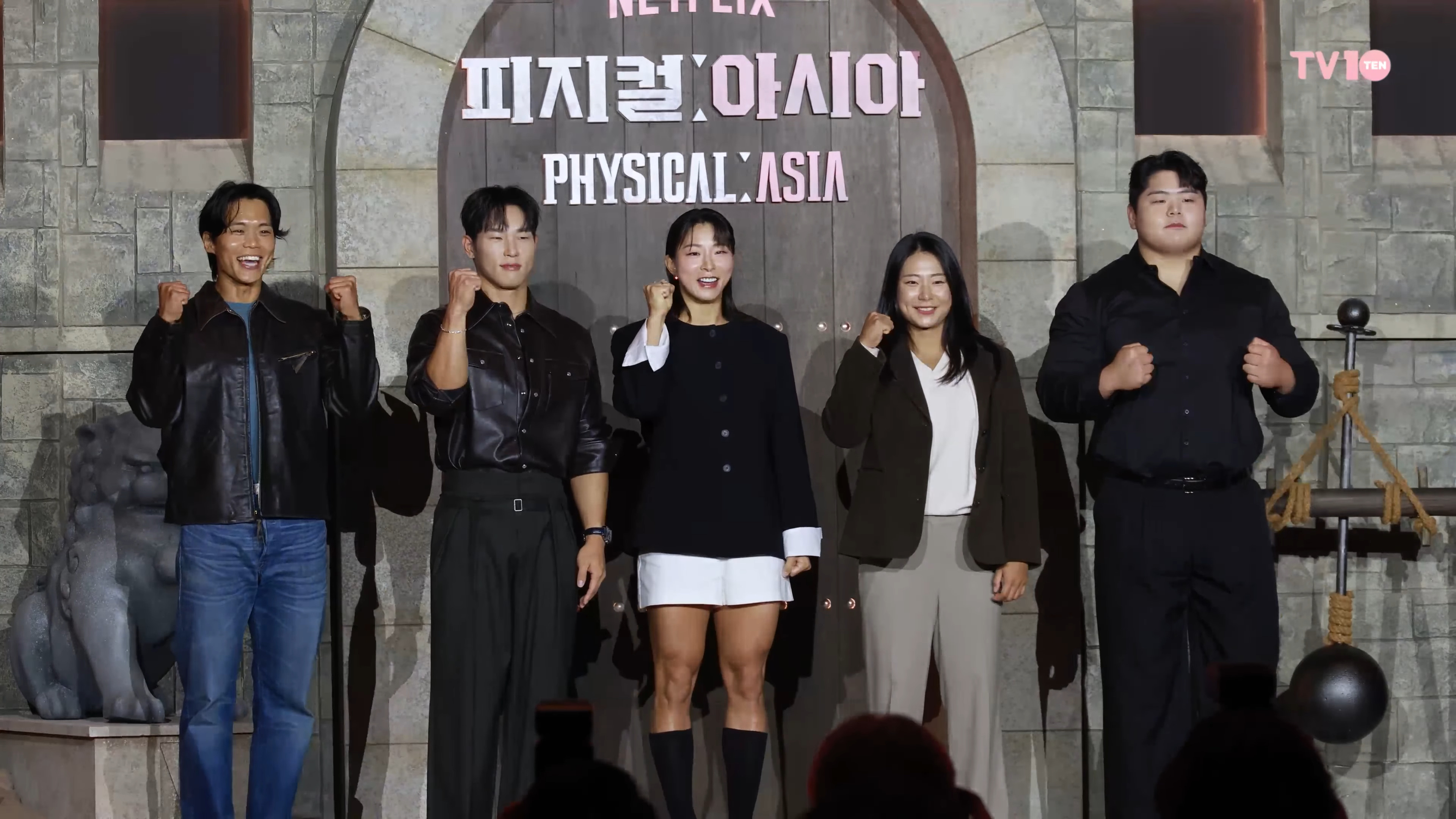
Team Korea (from left: Amotti, Yun Sung-bin, Jang Eun-sil, Choi Seung-yeon, and Kim Min-jae)

The show features 48 contestants from 8 different Asian countries. As with previous seasons, the contestants are a mix of professional athletes, fitness influencers, military personnel, and other individuals renowned for their physical prowess.

Teams
Team	Team South Korea	Team Japan	Team Thailand	Team Mongolia	Team Indonesia	Team Turkey	Team Australia	Team Philippines
Captain	Kim Dong-hyun (MMA Fighter)	Yushin Okami (MMA Fighter)	Superbon (Muay Thai Fighter)	Orkhonbayar Bayarsaikhan (Wrestler)	Igedz Executioner (Bodybuilder)	Recep Kara (Wrestler)	Robert Whittaker (MMA Fighter)	Manny Pacquiao (Boxer)
Members	Amotti (CrossFitter)	Kana Watanabe (MMA fighter)	Anucha Yospanya (Wrestler)	Adiyasuren Amarsaikhan (Judoka)	Fina Philippe (Jiu-Jitsu Fighter)	Ali Sofuoğlu (Karate fighter)	Alexandra Milne (Fitness coach)	Justin Coveney (Rugby player)
Members	Choi Seung-yeon (CrossFitter)	Katsumi Nakamura (Swimmer)	James Rusameekae (Volleyballer)	Dulguun Enkhbat (Basketball player )	Glenn Victor (Swimmer)	Anıl Berk Baki (Sailor)	Dom Tomato (Traceur)	Lara Lorraine Deang Liwanag (CrossFitter)
Members	Jang Eun-sil (Wrestler)	Nonoka Ozaki (Wrestler)	Jar Uracha Teerawanitsan (CrossFitter)	Enkh-Orgil Baatarkhuu (MMA fighter)	Jeremiah Lakhwani (Fitness Influencer)	Nefise Karatay (Track athlete)	Eddie Williams (Strongman)	Mark Mugen (MMA fighter)
Members	Kim Min-jae (Wrestler)	Soichi Hashimoto (Judoka)	Ploy Nuannaree Olsen (Bodybuilder)	Khandsuren Gantogtokh (Volleyball player)	Marcus Gideon (Badminton player)	Ogeday Girisken (Rower)	Eloni Vunakece (Rugby player)	Ray Jefferson Querubin (Strongman)
Members	Yun Sung-bin (Skeleton racer)	Yoshio Itoi (Baseball player)	Sunny Kerdkao Wechokittikorn (Rugby player)	Lkhagva-Ochir Erdene-Ochir (Acrobat)	Maria Selena (Basketball player)	Yasemin Adar Yiğit (Wrestler)	Katelin van Zyl (Hockey player and CrossFitter)	Robyn Lauren Brown (Hurdler)
Substitute					Isai Kesek (replaced Marcus Gideon on EP4)			Justin Hernandez (replaced Manny Pacquiao EP5)
Team colour								

== Quests ==
The quests follow a similar structure to the original Physical: 100 series, featuring challenges that test different aspects of physicality, including strength, endurance, agility, and strategy.

=== Quest 1: Territorial Conquest ===
In this team-based challenge, all teams compete simultaneously to capture and hold one of four raised platforms on a sand dune. The challenge is conducted over three rounds:

- Round 1: Eight teams compete for four available platforms.
- Round 2: The four winning teams compete for two available platforms.
- Round 3: The two winning teams compete for a single platform.

Each round lasts for two minutes. At the end of the time limit, the team with the most members standing on a platform wins the round. If teams have an equal number of members on a platform, a rematch is held. The final winning team earns the reward of deciding the matchups for the next quest.

Result
Round 1	Round 2	Round 3
Australia	Australia	
Japan	Japan	Japan
Turkey	Turkey	Turkey
South Korea	South Korea	
Indonesia
Mongolia
Philippines
Thailand

=== Quest 2: Shipwreck Salvage ===
Teams compete in head-to-head matches as determined by the previous quest's winner. The challenge requires teams to haul salvaged cargo from a shipwreck to a designated collection point within a 20-minute time limit. The team that accumulates the greatest total weight of cargo by the end of the time limit wins the match and advances to the next round, while the losing team is eliminated.

Result
Groups	Team 1	Cargo Weight	Team 2	Cargo Weight
A	Australia	2100 kg	Japan	1820 kg
B	Philippines	1290 kg	Mongolia	2000 kg
C	Thailand	1380 kg	South Korea	2120 kg
D	Indonesia	1480 kg	Turkey	1990 kg

=== Quest 2.5: Revival Challenge ===
Among the losing teams from Quest 2, the team with the highest score was granted the privilege of choosing its opponent for the elimination match. The challenge, similar to the Ball Possession match featured in Physical: 100, is titled a Deathmatch.

The challenge consists of five rounds (best of five), with the first team to win three rounds declared the winner and allowed to remain in the competition. The losing team is eliminated. Matches are conducted in both 1 vs 1 and 2 vs 2 formats, alternating each round. The objective is to place the ball inside the opponent's box within three minutes. The first team to score wins the round.

If neither team scores within the time limit, a one-minute rematch is held. In the rematch, victory is awarded to the team that maintains possession of the ball on the opponent's side of the field when time expires.

Thailand vs Philippines
Rounds Teams	Round 1	Round 2	Round 3	Round 4	Round 5	Result
Thailand	Sunny Kerdkao Wechokittikorn	Superbon & James Rusameekae	Anucha Yospanya	Jar Uracha Teerawanitsan & Ploy Nuannaree Olsen	—	Eliminated
Philippines	Mark Mugen	Manny Pacquiao & Ray Jefferson Querubin	Justin Coveney	Lara Lorraine Deang Liwanag & Robyn Lauren Brown	—	Advanced

Japan vs Indonesia
Rounds Teams	Round 1	Round 2	Round 3	Round 4	Round 5	Result
Japan	Soichi Hashimoto	Yoshio Itoi & Katsumi Nakamura	Yushin Okami	—	—	Advanced
Indonesia	Glenn Victor	Igedz Executioner & Fina Philippe	Jeremiah Lakhwani	—	—	Eliminated

=== Quest 3: Team Representative Challenge ===
In Quest 3, titled the Team Representative Challenge, the six remaining teams were divided into two groups of three teams each. Based on the overall rankings from the Shipwreck challenge, teams drew lots to determine their group assignments.

Quest 3 consisted of four individual game challenges, each testing strength, endurance, and agility:

- Sack Toss: One player from each team tossed a 14 kg sack over a 4-meter hurdle repeatedly within 30 seconds until the other two competitors failed. After every ten laps, the sack's weight increased and the time limit was shortened.
- Hanging Endurance: One player from each team hung from fabric strips for as long as possible.
- Stone Totem Endurance: Two players from each team stood back-to-back, supporting two stone totems weighing 135 kg each.
- Pillar Vaulting: Two runners from each team completed ten vault laps, with the second runner finishing by grabbing a flag.

In each game, the first-place team earned 3 points, the second-place team earned 2 points, and the third-place team earned 1 point. After all four games, the team with the lowest total score was eliminated. In the event of a tie, the Pillar Vaulting challenge was held again as a tiebreaker. Additionally, each member of a team was required to participate in at least one game.

A Group Matchups
Games Teams	Pillar Vaulting	Place	Stone Totem Endurance	Place	Hanging Endurance	Place	Sack Toss	Place	Total Score	Result
Australia	Dom Tomato & Katelin van Zyl	1st	Robert Whittaker & Eloni Vunakece	1st	Alexandra Milne	2nd	Eddie Williams	1st/2nd^{Note A}	10.5 pts	Advanced
South Korea	Yun Sung-bin & Kim Dong-hyun	2nd	Kim Min-jae & Jang Eun-sil	2nd	Choi Seung-yeon	3rd	Amotti	1st/2nd^{Note A}	7.5 pts	Advanced
Philippines	Robyn Lauren Brown & Lara Lorraine Deang Liwanag	3rd	Justin Coveney & Ray Jefferson Querubin	3rd	Mark Mugen	1st	Justin Hernandez	3rd	6 pts	Eliminated

B Group Matchups
Games Teams	Pillar Vaulting	Place	Stone Totem Endurance	Place	Hanging Endurance	Place	Sack Toss	Place	Total Score	Result
Mongolia	Dulguun Enkhbat & Khandsuren Gantogtokh	3rd	Adiyasuren Amarsaikhan & Enkh-Orgil Baatarkhuu	1st	Lkhagva-Ochir Erdene-Ochir	1st	Orkhonbayar Bayarsaikhan	1st/2nd^{Note C}	9.5 pts	Advanced
Japan	Soichi Hashimoto & Kana Watanabe	1st	Yushin Okami & Katsumi Nakamura	3rd^{Note B}	Nonoka Ozaki	3rd	Yoshio Itoi	1st/2nd^{Note C}	7.5 pts	Advanced
Turkey	Nefise Karatay & Ali Sofuoglu	2nd	Recep Kara & Yasemin Adar Yiğit	2nd	Anıl Berk Baki	2nd	Ogeday Girisken	3rd	7 pts	Eliminated

=== Mini Games ===
Following Quest 3, the remaining four teams took part in a series of friendly mini-challenges intended to showcase their abilities and assess their competitors. These events were exhibition-based and had no impact on the outcome of the main competition.

The first event was a one-on-one push-and-pull match, with participants chosen through a survey conducted by the production team. During filming, contestants were asked which opponents from other teams they would least like to face in a one-on-one match, and the two most-mentioned members from each team were selected to compete.

Round 1
(Australia) Eddie Williams	W
(South Korea) Kim Min-jae	L
Group A
(Mongolia) Orkhonbayar Bayarsaikhan	W
(Japan) Yoshio Itoi	L
(Australia) Robert Whittaker	L
(South Korea) Amotti	W
Group B
(Mongolia) Enkh-Orgil Baatarkhuu	L
(Japan) Yushin Okami	W

Round 2
(Australia) Eddie Williams	W
(Mongolia) Orkhonbayar Bayarsaikhan	L
(South Korea) Amotti	L
(Japan) Yushin Okami	W

Final
(Australia) Eddie Williams	W
(Japan) Yushin Okami	L

One-on-one push-and-pull match

For the vertical jump challenge, each team selected one representative.

Vertical Jump Matchup
Participant Height	(Japan) Katsumi Nakamura	(Australia) Eloni Vunakece	(Mongolia) Dulguun Enkhbat	(South Korea) Yun Sung-bin
3 meter	Cleared	Cleared	Cleared	Cleared
3.2 meter	Failed	Cleared	Failed	Failed

=== Quest 4: Battle Rope Relay ===
In Quest 4, the remaining four teams competed in a Battle Rope Relay, designed to test strength, endurance, coordination, and speed. Each team selected three representatives to participate. The event consisted of two rounds, with the team achieving the highest total score advancing directly to the semifinals, while the remaining teams competed in a Death Match for survival.

- Round 1: One player from each team struck targets with two battle ropes, switching with a teammate every 60 seconds, for 5 minutes total.
- Round 2: The two best-placed teams from round 1 competed in the same manner again, but this time for 4 minutes total.

Battle Rope Relay Result
Teams	Participants	Round 1		Round 2		Result
Teams	Participants	Count	Place	Count	Place	Result
Japan	Soichi Hashimoto, Yushin Okami, Yoshio Itoi	1194	2nd	1116	1st	Advanced
Australia	Robert Whittaker, Eddie Williams, Eloni Vunakece	1336	1st	961	2nd	Deathmatch participation
Mongolia	Dulguun Enkhbat, Enkh-Orgil Baatarkhuu, Lkhagva-Ochir Erdene-Ochir	1143	3rd	—N/a	—N/a	Deathmatch participation
South Korea	Choi Seung-yeon, Yun Sung-bin, Jang Eun-sil	763	4th	—N/a	—N/a	Deathmatch participation

=== Quest 4.5: Death Match ===
The three teams that did not advance competed in a Pillar Push Death Match, a challenge designed to eliminate one team before the semifinals. In this event, teams were required to push a 1,200 kg steel pillar for 100 laps. The first two teams to finish would advance. Additionally, three members from each team who did not participate in the previous match were required to compete in this event.

Pillar push
Teams	Participants	Laps	Placed	Result
South Korea	Kim Dong-hyun, Amotti, Kim Min-jae	100	1st	Advanced
Australia	Dom Tomato, Katelin van Zyl, Alexandra Milne	96	3rd	Eliminated
Mongolia	Orkhonbayar Bayarsaikhan, Adiyasuren Amarsaikhan, Khandsuren Gantogtokh	100	2nd	Advanced

=== Quest 5: Castle Conquest ===
In the fifth quest, titled "Castle Conquest," the three remaining teams each attempted a continuous objective separately, with their completion times compared to determine the winner. The challenge was designed to test teamwork, adaptability, and quick thinking within a realistic castle siege environment.

Teams were required to transport an 800 kg, four-wheeled carriage loaded with 1.4 tonnes of cargo. The sequence of tasks was as follows:

- Pull the heavy carriage across a sand-covered approach.
- Breach the castle's main door by breaking it down, using either the provided log or any other tools or methods they could devise.
- Cross a designated finish line inside the castle with the carriage, ensuring all 1.4 tonnes of cargo were still loaded.
- Fully raise the castle's 880 kg bridge gate using a rope system to secure the entrance.

The winner was the team that completed the entire sequence in the shortest time, provided it was under the one-hour limit. If two or more teams failed to complete all tasks within the hour, the team that managed to cross the finish line with the loaded carriage in the shortest time would be declared the winner.

Result
Teams	Finished Time	Placed	Result
South Korea	17 Minutes 52 Seconds	1st	Advanced
Mongolia	25 Minutes 15 Seconds	2nd	Advanced
Japan	Failed	3rd	Eliminated

=== Quest 6: Final Quest ===
The finale was a best-of-three series between the last two teams. The first team to win two games was crowned the overall winner.

==== Game 1: Wall Pushing Match ====
This game was a best-of-three rounds. Teams competed to push weighted boxes on three parallel lanes (100 kg, 200 kg, and 300 kg) against their opponents. Each round had a three-minute time limit, and winning a round required securing two of the three lanes by pushing the boxes into the opponent's territory.

Wall Pushing Result
Teams	Round 1		Round 2		Round 3		Result
Teams	Score	Result	Score	Result	Score	Result	Result
Mongolia	2	Won	1	Lost	1	Lost	Lost the Game
South Korea	1	Lost	2	Won	2	Won	Won the Game

==== Game 2: Iron Ball Dragging ====
In this game, all six team members were connected to heavy load of multiple hanging iron balls. Their goal was to work together to drag this shared load a set distance within a three-minute time limit. The challenge was played over five rounds, with teams taking turns. The total weight increased each round, scaled proportionally to each team's average weight. A single failure in any round meant losing the entire game. If both teams succeeded in all five rounds, a final, simultaneous tie-breaker round determined the winner by speed.

Iron Ball Dragging Result
Teams	Round 1	Round 2	Round 3	Round 4	Round 5	Final Round	Result
Mongolia	Cleared	Cleared	Cleared	Cleared	Cleared	Failed	Lost
South Korea	Cleared	Cleared	Cleared	Cleared	Cleared	1st	Won the Game

==== Game 3: Infinite Tail Tag Match ====
The third game was a simultaneous relay race. Both teams started on opposite sides of a track. The objective was for a team's runners to complete laps fast enough to successfully pass three runners from the opposing team. The first team to achieve this "three-pass" victory won the game.

Infinite Tail Tag Result
Teams	Result
South Korea	Match not held
Mongolia	Match not held

== Production ==
The production set required approximately 1,200 tons of sand and 40 tons of steel, covering an area roughly equivalent to five football fields. The filming environment was designed to highlight aspects of Korean culture, featuring a partial replica of Gyeongbokgung Palace as part of the set design.

== Reception ==
=== Pre-release anticipation ===
The announcement of Physical: Asia generated significant interest from fans of the original series, who are eager to see a pan-Asian competition and the inclusion of elite athletes from different countries.

=== Critical response ===
Physical: Asia received a positive review from The Guardian, which awarded it 4 out of 5 stars. The reviewer praised the series for retaining the "winning formula" of the original, highlighting the "super-strong contestants" and the show's "gleeful celebration of the magnificent human form." The review noted that the spin-off successfully delivers on the franchise's promise of "barrels wrapped in muscles and hair being put through their paces."

The review also commended the show's ability to create compelling narratives, stating it "makes heroes and villains, builds underdog stories and creates satisfying arcs over its run." It specifically highlighted the "territorial conquest" challenge as a standout, describing it as "a brutal, brilliant opening team game." While the critic felt the final challenge was slightly less compelling than the team-based quests, the review concluded that the series remains "utterly compelling television" and a "glorious, global celebration of strength in all its forms."

== Controversy ==
After the finale of Physical: Asia, some viewers and online commentators questioned the fairness of the competition, suggesting that certain production decisions appeared to advantage the South Korean team. According to reporting from the International Business Times, concerns were raised about several elements, including abrupt changes to challenge rules, unclear explanations regarding time adjustments, and technical issues that occurred during key events. Equipment malfunctions affecting non-Korean teams were also cited by critics as contributing to perceptions of unequal treatment.

The show’s outcome, which saw Team Korea win the season, further fueled debate among audiences who believed that the production environment—being entirely filmed in South Korea—might have contributed to structural advantages. These criticisms, however, have not been formally addressed by the producers, and no independent evidence has confirmed that the competition was manipulated.

== Notes ==
Note A. Australia had already secured advancement based on its first three matches. The final game became a decisive showdown between the Philippines and South Korea, both sitting at five points.

Note B. Due to technical issues, Japan completed the Stone Totem Endurance separately after Quest 3. Because Japan was 1 point ahead of Turkey and held the tiebreaker from Pillar Vaulting, they were guaranteed to survive Quest 3 even before their placement on Stone Totem Endurance was determined.

Note C. Similar to the Group A matchups, Turkey failed the challenge and was eliminated. Because of a tie, the winners of this game each earned 2.5 points.
