= King of Survival: Tribal War =

South Korean television show

- Promotional poster
- Hangul: 생존왕: 부족전쟁
- RR: Saengjonwang: bujokjeonjaeng
- MR: Saengjonwang: pujokchŏnjaeng
- Genre: Game show Reality show
- Directed by: Yun Jong-ho
- Starring: See below
- Country of origin: South Korea
- Original language: Korean
- No. of seasons: 1
- No. of episodes: 10

Production
- Producer: Lee Seung-hoon
- Production locations: South Korea; Malaysia
- Running time: 130 minutes
- Production companies: TV CHOSUN E&M

Original release
- Network: TV Chosun
- Release: October 7 – December 9, 2024

King of Survival: Tribal War (Korean: 생존왕: 부족전쟁; RR: Saengjonwang: bujokjeonjaeng) is a South Korean television program produced by TV CHOSUN E&M and broadcast on TV Chosun channel. The show features Kim Byung-man, Choo Sung-hoon, Lee Seung-gi, Park Tae-hwan, Jung Ji-hyun, Kim Dong-jun, Kim Dong-hyun, Park Ha-yan, Kang Min-ho, Amotti, Jong Tae-se, and Kim Min-ji.

The show was set in the remote jungles in Sabah, Malaysia.

The show aired every Monday at 22:00 (KST) from October 7 to December 9, 2024. It made available on Netflix and Astro Go on selected regions.

== Synopsis ==
King of Survival is a competition program that seeks to crown the ultimate survival champion in Korea. The contestants face off using their survival skills, physical strength, mental fortitude, and strategic abilities. 12 of the elite participants are divided into 4 teams and must endure 10 days of self-sufficient living in a remote jungle. In the end, only one will emerge as the strongest survivor.

== Cast ==
Team Jungle

- Kim Byung-man
- Jung Ji-hyun
- Kim Dong-jun

Team Fighter

- Choo Sung-hoon
- Kim Dong-hyun
- Park Ha-yan

Team Soldier

- Lee Seung-gi
- Kang Min-ho
- Amotti

Team National team

- Park Tae-hwan
- Jong Tae-se
- Kim Min-ji

== Production ==
On September 23, 2024, it was reported that the 12 contestants had departed for Malaysia, where they filmed the show for a 10 days period.
