= Cho Jung-myung =

South Korean luger (born 1993)

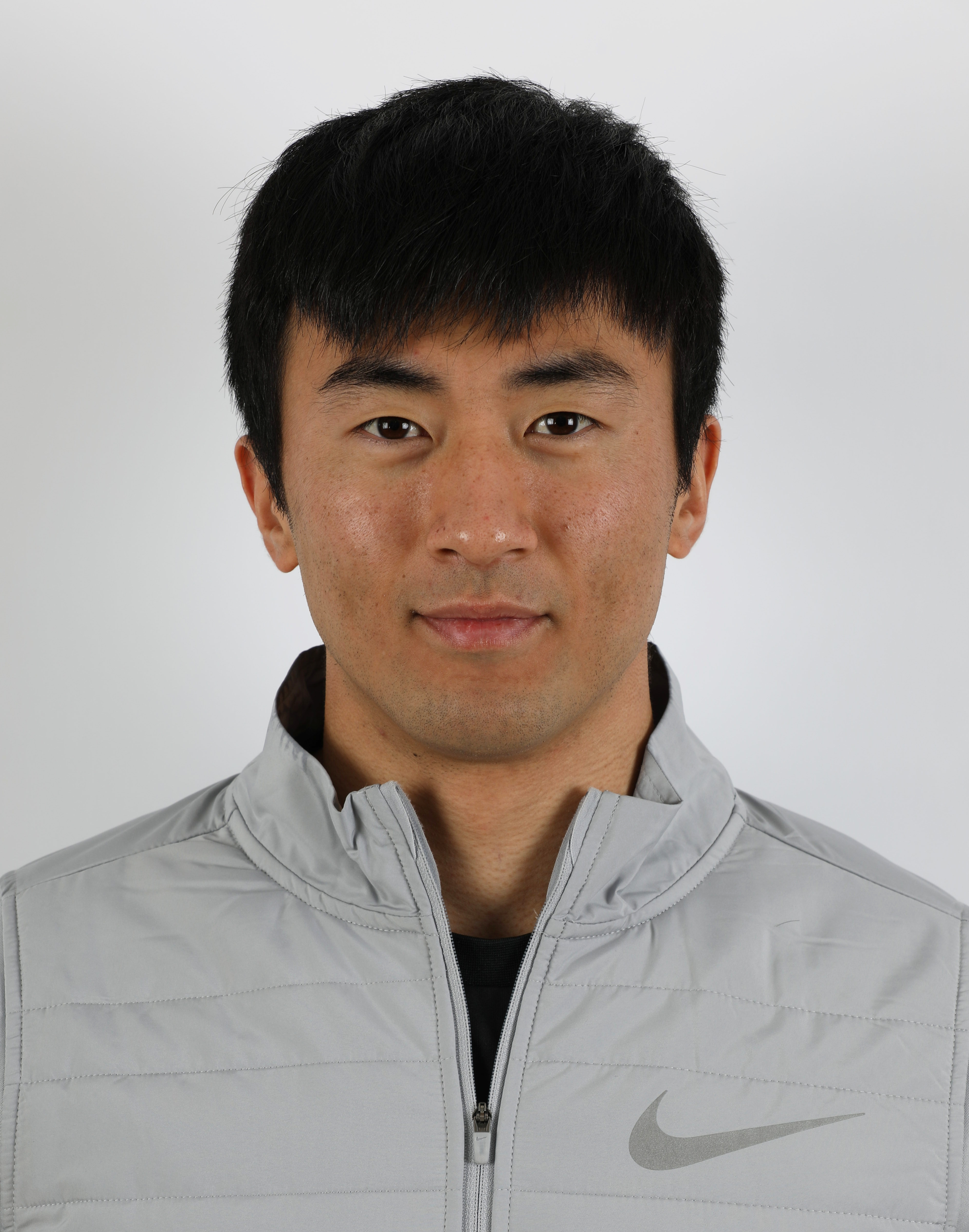
- Cho in 2018

Korean name
- Hangul: 조정명
- RR: Jo Jeongmyeong
- MR: Cho Chŏngmyŏng

Cho Jung-myung (Korean: 조정명; born 24 December 1993 in Seoul) is a South Korean luger. He competed at the 2014 Winter Olympics.

Cho was a contestant in the 2023 Netflix reality competition Physical: 100, as was his national luge doubles partner Park Jin-yong, who finished the show in 3rd place among the 100 participants.
