= Kim Kyung-hyun =

South Korean bobsledder

Kim Kyung-Hyun
Personal information
- Nationality: South Korean
- Born: 28 April 1994 (age 31) Ansan, South Korea
- Height: 1.79 m (5 ft 10 in)
- Weight: 98 kg (216 lb)

Sport
- Country: South Korea
- Sport: Bobsleigh

Kim Kyung-Hyun (born April 28, 1994 in Ansan) is a South Korean bobsledder.

Kim competed at the 2014 Winter Olympics for South Korea. He teamed with driver Kim Dong-Hyun, Kim Sik and Oh Jea-Han as the South Korea-2 sled in the four-man event, finishing 28th.

Kim made his Bobsleigh World Cup debut in December 2013. As of April 2014, his best World Cup finish is 25th, in 2013-14 at Lake Placid.
