= Oh Jea-han =

South Korean bobsledder

Oh Jea-Han
Personal information
- Nationality: South Korean
- Born: 12 April 1991 (age 34) Namyangju, South Korea
- Height: 1.80 m (5 ft 11 in)
- Weight: 95 kg (209 lb)

Sport
- Country: South Korea
- Sport: Bobsleigh

Oh Jea-Han (born April 12, 1991 in Namyangju) is a South Korean bobsledder.

Oh competed at the 2014 Winter Olympics for South Korea. He teamed with driver Kim Dong-Hyun, Kim Sik and Kim Kyung-Hyun in the South Korea-2 sled in the four-man event, finishing 28th.

Oh made his World Cup debut in December 2013. As of April 2014, his best World Cup finish is 25th, in 2013-14 at Lake Placid.
