= Physical: 100 =

South Korean reality television series

- Also known as: Physical: 100 Season 2 – Underground
- Hangul: 피지컬: 100
- RR: Pijikeol: 100
- MR: P'ijik'ŏl: 100
- Genre: Reality competition; Survival; Variety show
- Created by: Jang Ho-gi
- Written by: Kang Sook-kyung; Jo Geun-ae
- Directed by: Jang Ho-gi; Jeon Seo-jin; Lee Jong-il
- Music by: Yeeset; Kim Sung-soo
- Country of origin: South Korea
- Original language: Korean
- No. of seasons: 2
- No. of episodes: 18

Production
- Executive producer: Kim Hyun-gi
- Producers: Yoon Kwon-soo; Yang Hae-ji
- Cinematography: Jung Jang-soo; Kim Chan-hong; Park Jae-young
- Running time: 51–96 minutes
- Production companies: MBC; Luyworks Media; Galaxy Corporation

Original release
- Network: Netflix
- Release: January 24, 2023 – March 19, 2024

Related
- Physical: Asia (2025); Physical 100: Italy (2026); Physical 100: Mexico (2026); Physical 100: USA; Physical 100: Sweden; 100% Physique: France

Physical: 100 (Korean: 피지컬: 100) is a South Korean reality competition series on Netflix created by MBC producer Jang Ho-gi. The first season premiered on January 24, 2023. The second season premiered on March 19, 2024. After the second season ended, a spin-off titled, Physical: Asia, was announced, and would include people from many countries in Asia.

The show's premise is to find the ideal human physique based on performance.

== Format ==
100 competitors, all known for their well-developed physical attributes and physique, go head-to-head in various individual and team challenges, or 'quests' of strength, balance, agility, endurance, willpower and strategy. The competition is formatted like a tournament. After each quest, participants are eliminated until only one remains to win the prize of ₩300 million (≈ US$240,000 (Note: Different conversions estimate the total at US$230–250 thousand.)). Every participant has a plaster cast of their torso on the set; when they are eliminated, they must destroy the cast with a sledgehammer.

The show has often been compared to Squid Game, a 2021 South Korean survival drama television series, for their similarities in the large scale competition-elimination format with elaborate challenges and set, as well as the same nation of origin.

== Participants ==
=== Season 1 ===
The show started off with 100 participants, 77 men and 23 women, with some being eliminated each episode. Many of the contestants were professional sportspeople for South Korea's national teams and fitness influencers.

List of season 1 participants
Name	Occupation / known for
Agent H	Korea Navy UDT/SEAL reservist (petty officer first class) and YouTuber
Caro	Fitness vlogger
Cha Hyun-seung	Dancer and model
Cho Jung-myung	Luger
Choi Hyun-mi	Boxer
Choo Sung-hoon	Former judoka and MMA fighter, television personality
Dustin Nippert	Baseball player
Hong Beom-seok	Retired firefighter and Korea Army Special Forces (707th Special Mission Group) master sergeant reservist
Jang Seong-min	Rugby player
Jeong Bo-kyeong	Judoka
Jjang Jae	Korea Navy UDT/SEAL reservist (petty officer first class) and YouTuber
Kang Han	Bobsledder
Kim Kang-min	Bodybuilder
Kim Sik	National team skeleton coach
Kim Seong-hun	Trainer
Kim Seong-jun	Fitness model
Kim Ye-hyun	Fencer
Lee Yong-seung	Bodybuilder
Nam Kyung-jin	Wrestler
Park Jin-yong	Luger
Park Seon-kwan	Swimmer
Shim Eu-ddeum	Pilates instructor and YouTuber
Son Hee-chan	Ssireum wrestler
Son Hee-dong	Wrestler
Song A-reum	Bodybuilder
Woo Jin-yong	CrossFitter and snowboarder
Yang Hak-seon	Artistic gymnast, 2012 Summer Olympics gold medalist
Yun Sung-bin	Skeleton racer, 2018 Winter Olympics gold medalist
Kim Ji-han	Volleyball player
Yun Seok-hwan	Swimmer
Kim Gyeong-jin	Farmer
YoYo	Model
Kwak Myung-sik	CrossFitter and MMA fighter
Carlos	CrossFitter
Park Jung-ho	Prison guard
Kim Chun-ri	Bodybuilder
Kkang Mi	Korea Army Special Forces (707th Special Mission Group) reservist (sergeant first class)
An Da-jeong	Bodybuilder
Park Min-ji	Ssireum wrestler
Jang Eun-sil	Wrestler
Bbulkup	Restaurant owner and YouTuber
Ma Sun-ho	Bodybuilder
Kang Chun-il	Dancer, model and stage actor
Park Hyung-geun	MMA fighter
Jo Jin-hyeong	Strongman and car dealer
Miracle Nelson Chinonso	Dancer and model
Kim Ji-wook	Diver
Seong Chi-hyeon	Casino employee
Yoo Sang-hun	MMA fighter
Joo Dong-jo	MMA fighter
Lee Guk-young	Musical actor
Lee Ju-hyung	Ice hockey player
Seo Ha-yan	CrossFitter
Choi Gyu-tae	Ballerino
Choi Min-yong	Marathon runner
Choi In-ho	Trainer
Florian Krapf	Advertisement model
Gil Hwan	Scuba diver
Kim Min-cheol	Ice climber, Korea National Park mountain rescue ranger
Kim Byeong-jin	Taekwondo practitioner
Kim Sang-wook	MMA fighter, Korea Navy UDT/SEAL reservist (sergeant)
Kim Eun-ji	Fitness coach
Kim Jeong-uk	Restaurant owner
Vita Mikju	Pole dancer
Park Jong-hyeok	Illustrator
Park Seong-hyeok	Trainer
Bang Ji-hoon	Bodybuilder
Hoju Tarzan	Travel YouTuber
Seol Ki-kwan	Bodybuilder
Shin Dong-guk	Firefighter, Korea Army Special Forces reservist
Shin Bo-mi-rae	Boxer
Shin Se-gye	Stuntman
Dbo	Rapper
Austin Kang	Chef
Yu Ga-ram	Rollerskater
Yun Jun-hyeoup	Model
Lee Da-yeon	Ssireum wrestler
Lee Dae-won	Trot singer and MMA fighter
Lee So-yeong	Fitness model
Lee Jun-myeong	Calisthenics coach
Miho	Fitness coach
Elaine Yuki Wong	Actress
Jeon Min-seok	Coast guard
Jeon Young	Film choreographer and stuntman
Jeong Han-saem	Musical actor
Jung Hae-min	Track cyclist
OVAN	Singer
Chae Wan-ki	Jiu-jitsu fighter
Ha Je-yong	Power lifter and arm-wrestling champion
Hwang Bit-yeo-ul	CrossFitter
Kim Kyung-baek	Korea Navy UDT/SEAL instructor
Kim Da-young	Stuntwoman
Lee Min-woo	Chef
Lee Ye-ji	MMA fighter
Im Jeong-yun	Sports student
Jo Yeon-joo	Cheerleader
Jo I-taek	Actor
Choi Sung-hyeok	Pole dancer
Ko Da-young	Pilates instructor
Park Ji-su	Rugby player

=== Season 2 ===
The show started out with a 100 contestants, 72 men and 28 women. Most of the contestants are sportspeople for South Korea influence. The list is broken down into 5 groups: warriors, national representatives, natural body competitors, superstars, athletic celebrities.

List of season 2 participants
Name	Occupation/known for
Kim Dong-hyun	MMA Fighter
Hong Beom-seok	Former firefighter and Physical: 100 season 1 contestant
Sim Yu-ri	MMA Fighter
Kang Cheong-myeong	Korea Coast Guard Officer
Lim Soo-jin	Bodybuilder
Ku Sung-hoe	Reserve Sergeant First Class
Ko Jong-hun	Special Operation Unit Member
Gibson	U.S. Army Major
Park Woo-jin	Korea Coast Guard Officer
Seol Young-ho	MMA Fighter
Jo Sung-bin	MMA Fighter
Ham Young-jin	Police Officer
Hunter Lee	FBI Diplomat
Hwang Mun-kyeong	Firefighter/Paramedic
Jang Sung-yeop	Bodybuilder
Lee Hyun-woo	Bodybuilder
Kang Eun-hee	Bodybuilder
Kim Nam-wook	Bodybuilder
Kim Min-su	Bodybuilder
Jung Ji-hyun	Wrestler
Jung You-in	Swimmer
Shin Soo-ji	Rhythmic Athlete
Lee Won-hee	Judo Athlete
Park Seung-hi	Short-Track Speed Skater
Mo Tae-bum	Speed Skater
Andre Jin	Rugby Team Athlete
Kim Do-hyeon	Boxer
Kim Dong-hyun	Bobsledder
Kim Jee-hyuk	Rowing Team Athlete
Kim Hyeong-kyu	Boxer
Kim Hye-bin	Wushu Sandy Team Athlete
Kang Min-su	Sports Climber
Park Da-sol	Judo Athlete
Park Yeon-su	Powerlifter
Park Hee-jun	Karate Athlete
Seo Young-woo	Bobsledder
Kang Young-seo	Alpine Skier
Eom Dae-hyun	Parkour Athlete
Lee Ye-joo	Kurash Athlete
Lee Jang-kun	Kabaddi Team Athlete
Chang Yong-heung	Rugby Athlete
Lee Hyun-jeong	Education Teacher
Jo Ha-rang	Handball Team Player
Joo Min-kyung	Arm Wrestler
Choi Won-jae	Cheerleading Team Athlete
Heo Kyung-hee	Rugby Team Athlete
Hwang Choong-won	Professional CrossFitter
Lee Hyun-jin	Actor
Ko Hyo-joo	Skateboarder
Hong Da-eun	Arborist
Power Who Yami	Cosplayer
Kim Ki-hyuk	Announcer
Kim Amugae	YouTuber
Ahn Sung-hwan	CEO of a Food Service Company
Sim Sung-eon	Nurse
Son Yeong-seok	Officer Worker
Wi Sung-oh	Trainer
Yoon Han-jin	College Student (Special PhysEd)
Jang Yoon-sung	CEO of a Food Company Service
Jeon Hee-jeong	Stunt Performer
Jo Han	College Student (Sports and Leisure)
Ju Sung-min	Doctor of Korean Medicine
Juyang	CEO of an Apparel Company
Kim Hee-hyun	Ballerino
Kim Bong-yun	Carpenter
Kang Ji-kun	Jige Porter
Park Ha-yan	Handball Player
Chong Te-se	Soccer Player
Kim Ji-eun	Track and Field Athlete
Hwang Chan-seob	Ssireum Athlete
Kim Dam-bi	Weightlifter
Go Min-jung	Professional CrossFitter
Kim Yeong-chan	Taekkyon Athlete
Ryu Si-hyun	Street Lifting Athlete
Amber Yang	Professional CrossFitter
Lee Jun-ha	American Football Player
Im Su-jeong	Ssireum Athlete
Kim Min-ho	Professional Wrestler
Jang Jun-hyuk	Wrestler
Choi Soo-in	Brazilian Jiu-jitsu Athlete
Hong Hyeon-jun	Long Driver Golfer
Ha Moo-kyung	Handball Player
Lee Jae-yoon	Canadian Actor
Kang So-yeon	TV Personality
Amotti	CrossFitter
Knucks	Dancer
Kwon Ga-young	Fitness Model
Lee Jang-jun	Lead Singer and Rapper of K-Pop Group Golden Child
Park Kwang-jae	Actor
Lee Kyu-ho	Actor
GPT	YouTuber
Noh Sung-yul	Martial Arts Tricker
Lee Ho-yeon	Model
Justin Harvey	Actor
Jeon Jong-hyeok	Singer
Jung Dae-jin	Sports Model
Kang Seung-min	YouTuber
Kim Woo-joo	Fashion Model
Emmanuel	Fitness Model
No Seung-Hyuk	Dance Artist

== Quests ==
Each quest differs regarding both the physical challenge as well as the number of contestants at risk of elimination.

=== Season 1 ===
==== Quest 0: Hanging challenge ====
The 100 contestants were split into two groups of 50 (based on a chosen number) and competed to hang from a bar raised above water for as long as they could. The contestants were ranked according to how long they hung onto the bar before falling into the water.

- Winner from Group 1 – Kim Kyung-baek, Korea Navy UDT/SEAL instructor
- Winner from Group 2 – Kim Min-cheol, ice climber and Korea National Park mountain rescue ranger

==== Quest 1: Death match challenge ====
Contestants compete one-on-one to gain possession of a ball. The contestant with possession of the ball at the 3-minute mark proceeded to the next Quest, while the other contestant was eliminated.

Before the quest, contestants were ranked based on their Quest 0 timing, and contestants that were ranked higher had the benefit to choose their opponent and the type of Battle Arena they want to compete in:

- Battle Arena A included many obstacles, emphasizing contestant agility and speed.
- Battle Arena B was simpler, with a large flat area of sand with a pool of water in the middle, emphasizing contestant strength and grappling ability.

If neither contestant had possession after three minutes, the game was restarted with one minute on the clock. Half of the contestants were eliminated in the process (50).

==== Quest 2: Moving sand challenge ====
Before Quest 2, the remaining 50 contestants were required to choose three contestants with whom they wanted to team up. The ten contestants with the most votes were declared team leaders and were ranked based on the numbers of votes they received.

- Team Leader 1 – Yun Sung-bin, skeleton racer, 2018 Winter Olympics gold medalist
- Team Leader 2 – Nam Kyung-jin, wrestler
- Team Leader 3 – Kwak Myung-sik, crossfitter and MMA fighter
- Team Leader 4 – Choo Sung-hoon, former judoka and MMA fighter, television personality
- Team Leader 5 – Hoju Tarzan, travel YouTuber
- Team Leader 6 – Kim Sang-wook, MMA fighter, Korea Navy UDT/SEAL reservist (sergeant)
- Team Leader 7 – Ma Sun-ho, bodybuilder
- Team Leader 8 – Jo Jin-hyeong, strongman and car dealer
- Team Leader 9 – Jang Seong-min, rugby player
- Team Leader 10 – Jang Eun-sil, wrestler

Contestants lined up for the team leader they wanted to join. In order of their number of votes, each team leader picked four members to form a team of five. Contestants who were not chosen had to pick another team.

Teams
Team	Team 1	Team 2	Team 3	Team 4	Team 5	Team 6	Team 7	Team 8	Team 9	Team 10
Leader	Yun Sung-bin	Nam Kyung-jin	Kwak Myung-sik	Choo Sung-hoon	Hoju Tarzan	Kim Sang-wook	Ma Sun-ho	Jo Jin-hyeong	Jang Seong-min	Jang Eun-sil
Members	Kim Sik	Jjang Jae	Kang Han	Shin Bo-mi-rae	Dbo	OVAN	Kim Kang-min	Jung Hae-min	Kim Ye-hyun	Seo Ha-yan
Members	Cha Hyun-seung	Park Ji-su	Lee Jun-myeong	Kim Min-cheol	Shim Eu-ddeum	Joo Dong-jo	Jeong Han-saem	Park Jin-yong	Seong Chi-hyun	Miho
Members	Son Hee-dong	Son Hee-chan	Lee Min-woo	Woo Jin-yong	Im Jeong-yun	An Da-jeong	Miracle Nelson	Cho Jung-myung	Choi Sung-hyuk	Yang Hak-seon
Members	Seol Ki-kwan	Hwang Bit-yeo-ul	Park Jong-hyeok	Dustin Nippert	Bang Seong-Hyeok	Bang Ji-hoon	Song A-reum	Kim Da-young	Lee Guk-young	Park Hyung-geun
Team colour										

After selecting their team members, team leaders picked the team that they would like to compete against, not knowing what the quest challenge would be.

For Quest 2, each team of five had to work together to build a bridge, and then carry bags of sand across the bridge. Teams were not allowed to pass bags of sand to another team member; they had to carry the bags of sand individually to the other end. After twelve minutes, the team with the least amount of sand accumulated was eliminated.

Quest 2 Challenge Results
	Winning team	Losing team
Match #1	Team 10: Jang Eun-sil; Seo Ha-yan; Yang Hak-seon; Miho; Park Hyung-geun	Team 2: Nam Kyung-jin; Jjang Jae; Park Ji-su; Son Hee-chan; Hwang Bit-yeo-ul
Match #2	Team 7: Ma Sun-ho; Kim Kang-min; Jeong Han-saem; Miracle Nelson; Song A-reum	Team 6: Kim Sang-wook; OVAN; Joo Dong-jo; An Da-jeong; Bang Ji-hoon
Match #3	Team 1: Yun Sung-bin; Son Hee-dong; Cha Hyun-seung; Seol Ki-kwan; Kim Sik	Team 9: Jang Seong-min; Kim Ye-hyun; Seong Chi-hyun; Choi Sung-hyeok; Lee Guk-young
Match #4	Team 4: Choo Sung-hoon; Shin Bo-mi-rae; Woo Jin-yong; Kim Min-cheol; Dustin Nippert	Team 5: Hoju Tarzan; Dbo; Shim Eu-ddeum; Im Jeong-yun; Bang Seong-hyeok
Match #5	Team 8: Jo Jin-hyeong; Jung Hae-min; Park Jin-yong; Cho Jung-myung; Kim Da-young	Team 3: Kwak Myung-sik; Kang Han; Lee Jun-myeong; Lee Min-woo; Park Jong-hyeok

==== Quest 2.5: Revival challenge ====
Exclusively for those who were eliminated in Quest 2, contestants were taken to another room, where they found their torsos hanging from the ceiling.

The game required all contestants to hold onto a rope connected to their torso, with 40% of the contestant's total body weight added, for as long as possible to prevent it from falling to the ground and breaking apart. The last five contestants holding their rope re-entered the competition for Quest 3.

Winners

- Kim Sang-wook, who was elected as leader of the surviving team
- Seong Chi-hyun
- Choi Sung-hyuk
- Shim Eu-ddeum
- Lee Jun-myeong

==== Quest 3: Ship moving challenge ====
In Quest 3, the six teams had to join forces to create three teams of ten. The teams spent some time debating how they would join, with the last two excluded teams being joined by default.

The combined teams of ten had to each work together to dig up oak barrels from the sand and load them onto a 1.5-tonne ship. The additional weight of the oak barrels was 0.5-tonne, meaning the combined load weighed 2.0 tonnes. The teams then had to drag/push the ship off a wooden platform onto logs in the sand, across the sand-filled arena on the logs, then up a wooden ramp until they could pull a mooring rope over an iron stake.

The two teams with the fastest time progressed to the next Quest, while the team with the slowest time was eliminated.

Quest 3 Challenge Results
	Team 1	Team 2	Team 3
Team Members	Choo Sung-hoon; Shin Bo-mi-rae; Woo Jin-yong; Kim Min-cheol; Dustin Nippert; Jo Jin-hyeong; Jung Hae-min; Park Jin-yong; Cho Jung-myung; Kim Da-young	Ma Sun-ho; Kim Kang-min; Jeong Han-saem; Miracle Nelson; Song A-reum; Yun Sung-bin; Son Hee-dong; Cha Hyun-seung; Seol Ki-kwan; Kim Sik	Jang Eun-sil; Seo Ha-yan; Yang Hak-seon; Miho; Park Hyung-geun; Kim Sang-wook; Seong Chi-hyun; Choi Sung-hyeok; Shim Eu-ddeum; Lee Jun-myeong
Time	13:34	19:55	22:15

Team 1 and Team 2 won with times of 13:34 and 19:55 respectively. Team 3 lost with a time of 22:15 and was eliminated.

==== Quest 4: Team delegate challenge ====
The remaining 20 contestants returned to their original teams of five, deciding who among them would compete in each of five different games based on ancient mythology. The winner of each game would advance to the final, while the remaining contestants would be eliminated.

===== Game 1: Punishment of Atlas =====
The Punishment of Atlas had contestants hold a 50 kg (110.2 lb) rock for as long as possible, until only one was left standing.

Winner

- Jo Jin-hyeong

Eliminations

- Shin Bo-mi-rae
- Kim Kang-min
- Kim Sik

Shin Bo-mi-rae was unable to lift the stone above her shoulders at all. Kim Kang-min dropped out after about 15 minutes. At just past the two hour mark, Kim Sik also dropped out, leaving Jo Jin-hyeong as the winner. Jo later commented that he was near his own breaking point.

===== Game 2: Fire of Prometheus =====
The Fire of Prometheus had contestants running through an obstacle course in repetition to grab a torch; the person holding the last torch would win.

Winner

- Park Jin-yong

Eliminations

- Dustin Nippert
- Seol Ki-kwan
- Miracle Nelson

Nippert stumbled on the first obstacle in the first rep, and never regained the pace of the other three. The remaining matches were closer, hinging on Park Jin-yong scaling the obstacle cleanly and landing in a position to immediately begin running, while Miracle's body was twisting as he came over, leaving him just a moment slower to start running towards the torches.

===== Game 3: Wings of Icarus =====
The Wings of Icarus had contestants climb a rope and endure climbing for as long as possible, until only one contestant remained.

Winner

- Kim Min-cheol

Eliminations

- Song A-reum
- Kim Da-young
- Son Hee-dong

Song A-reum and Kim Da-young, the last two women in the competition, dropped out first. Son Hee-dong lasted a little bit longer, but ice climber Kim Min-cheol was easily able to secure victory.

===== Game 4: Tail of Ouroboros =====
The Tail of Ouroboros had contestants chase each other around a track in a bid to tag out the person ahead of them, until only one remained.

Winner

- Woo Jin-yong

Eliminations

- Cha Hyun-seung
- Cho Jung-myung
- Jeong Han-saem

===== Game 5: Punishment of Sisyphus =====
The Punishment of Sisyphus had contestants push a 100 kg boulder up and over a hill every 40 seconds, as many times as possible, until only one remained.

Winner

- Jung Hae-min

Eliminations

- Ma Sun-ho
- Choo Sung-hoon
- Yun Sung-bin

All four were able to push the boulder over the hill many times, with the winner having the greatest stamina and cardio endurance.

==== Quest 5: The final quest ====
The five survivors who competed in the final quest of Physical: 100 were Jo Jin-hyeong, Park Jin-yong, Kim Min-cheol, Woo Jin-yong, and Jung Hae-min. They competed in four games, with one contestant being eliminated in each game. The contestants started in a pentagonal formation, reducing at each stage until it became a dot.

===== Game 1 =====
The first game was a five-way tug of war, with all contestants trying to secure a key in front of them in order to unlock their padlock. Kim Min-cheol and Woo Jin-yong were the last two to unlock their padlocks, and did so nearly simultaneously.

Replays showed that Woo unlocked himself about a second before Kim did, resulting in Kim being eliminated even though he was a favourite to win following his victories in many of the prior quests.

===== Game 2 =====
The second game was a "square flip" challenge. The remaining four contestants split into teams of two and tried to flip as many tiles as possible for five minutes. The playing field contained 66 tiles, with 33 of each colour facing up to begin the match. One side of each tile was white and the other was black, and the team with most tiles flipped to their colour won. The losing team had to compete with each other one on one for three minutes.

Jung Hae-min, as the first competitor to release himself in the tug-of-war game, was allowed to select his partner. After first selecting Woo Jin-yong, he changed his mind and instead selected Park Jin-yong. This team won the first team round by a score of 37–29. This left Jo Jin-hyeong and Woo Jin-yong to go head-to-head to progress to the third game. The smaller and quicker Woo easily won the head-to-head round 48–18, meaning Jo Jin-hyeong was eliminated.

===== Game 3 =====
The third game was a triangular shuttle run, with the remaining three contestants forced to run back and forth between their start point and the "next apex" before the next start signal. As the game progresses, the time to complete the shuttle runs gets shorter.

The contestant who could not make it back to their original point before the next signal lost the game. After 85 reps, done without cease, Park Jin-yong collapsed at his starting position, which led to his elimination.

===== Game 4 =====
The fourth and final game was infinite rope-pulling. The two contestants had to pull their rope until it was loose, grab the other end of the rope, and then destroy their opponent's torso.

Woo Jin-yong won the final game and thus won Physical: 100, while Jung Hae-min was eliminated. Woo was personally covered in both Insider and The Straits Times after his victory on the show.

=== Season 2 ===
==== Quest 0: Treadmill Run ====
Contests ran on manual treadmills for 10 minutes. 50 contestants with the highest total distance ran for an additional 7 minutes. From that group, 10 contestants with the highest total distance ran for a final 5 minutes. Contests were then ranked from 1 to 100 with 1 assigned to contestant who ran the farthest distance, and 100 assigned to contestant who ran the shortest distance.

==== Quest 1: Death Match Challenge ====
Same as season 1 except for changes to the arenas - there are now 3 arenas to choose from:

- Playground
- Water
- UFC cage

==== Quest 2: Maze Race ====
Before Quest 2, the remaining 50 contestants were required to choose three contestants with whom they wanted to team up. The ten contestants with the most votes were declared team leaders and were ranked based on the numbers of votes they received.

The ten team leaders have the authority to pick their teammates. In the order of number of votes, the team leaders will be picking one teammate at a time, out of the 40 contestants.

Teams
Team	Team 1	Team 2	Team 3	Team 4	Team 5	Team 6	Team 7	Team 8	Team 9	Team 10
Leader	Kim Dong-hyun (MMA fighter)	Hong Beom-seok	Amotti	Lee Won-hee	Jung Ji-hyun	Kim Min-su	Lee Jae-yoon	Andre Jin	Hwang Choong-won	Lee Jang-kun
Members	Jung Dae-jin	Gibson	Kim Jee-Hyuk	Park Da-sol	Seo Young-woo	Chong Te-se	Jo Sung-bin	Chang Young-Heung	Kim Dong-hyun (bobsledder)	Kim Hyeong-kyu
Members	Ko Jong-hun	Kang Cheong-myeong	Kim Do-hyeon	Ham Young-jin	Ha Moo-kyoung	Jang Sung-yeop	Lee Hyun-jeong	Park Woo-jin	Sim Yu-ri	Kim Amugae
Members	Lee Ho-yeon	Seol Young-ho	Kang Young-seo	Lim Soo-jin	Kim Ji-eun	Eom Dae-hyun	Justin Harvey	Power Who Yami	Lee Jun-ha	Go Min-jung
Members	Wi Sung-oh	Park Ha-yan	Kim Ki-hyuk	Kim Yeong-chan	Jang Jun-hyuk	Kim Dam-bi	Joo Min-kyung	Jung You-in	Jo Ha-rang	Hong Da-eun

After selecting their team members, team leaders picked the team that they would like to compete against, not knowing what the quest challenge would be.

Quest 2 in Season 2 is similarly a five-on-five death match, except in this case sand in bags ranging from six kilograms to 20 kilograms are placed in the center of a maze, special supplies weigh more and are hiding in the corners of the maze. Three balancing scales are distributed across the maze. The team with control of 2 out of 3 scales by the end of 15 minutes wins the match and the other team is eliminated.

==== Quest 2.5: Pillar Challenge ====
Contestants eliminated during quest 2 are given an opportunity for redemption. Contests must secure one of 1 to 10 poles by hugging it and being in control of the pole by the end of each 3 minute round. A single winner chose 4 fellow contestants to return to the game as a 6th 5-member team.

==== Quest 3: Mine Challenge ====
Teams select who to participate in each of 4 rounds. First place team in each round earns 3 points, second place earns 2 points, and third place earns 1 point. Every team member must participate at least once. The team with the lowest points at the end of the 4 rounds is eliminated. In case of a tie in points, the team with the higher overall time is eliminated.

===== Round 1 =====
Two contestants take turns pushing mine carts down a track, loading it with sand bags weighing 40 kilograms each, and pushing the loaded mine cart back to the starting position. The total weight is 2 metric tons.

===== Round 2 =====
A single contestant uses the same mine carts and track to transport 1.2 metric tons of sandbags.

===== Round 3 =====
Two contestants participate in a relay race where each contestant must travel the length of the course on monkey bars while pushing a bag on a sliding track.

===== Round 4 =====
A single contestant completes both laps on their own.

==== Quest 4: Hi-Roller Challenge ====
Team members compete with each other in a survival race. For each team, each team member must run to one end of course and drag a roller weighing 150 kilogram back to the start. They repeat this for a second roller before running across the course one last time. The slowest contestant is eliminated and the race is repeated until only one team member remains. This is repeated until only one team member remains per team. Lee Hyun-Jeong, Park Ha-Yan, and Jung You-In were the remaining 3 women in the competition and were the first ones to drop out in each heat.

==== Quest 5: World's Strongest Man ====
The Final Four athletes compete for the title with one athlete being eliminated in each round. This challenge is called World's Strongest Man. It consists challenges for 3 rounds, torso hoist, infinity coal squat, and clockwise pole push (2 out 3 rounds).

===== Round 1 =====
Similar to the redemption challenge in Season 1, each contest holds a rope connected to a pulley and their plaster torso plus additional weight adding up to 40% of their body weight. The first person to drop their plaster torso is eliminated.

Justin John Harvey was eliminated.

===== Round 2 =====
Contestants must squat increasingly heavy weights in response to a timer. The contestant who fails first is eliminated.

Andre Jin was eliminated.

===== Round 3 =====
Contestants must push a bar from opposing ends to knock over a pole. Best 2 out of 3 wins the title.

Hong Beom-seok won the first round. Amotti won the second round. Amotti won the third round.

Hong Beom-seok was eliminated.

Amotti won the title of Physical 100 Champion.

== Reception ==
=== Viewership ===
The show rose to be the most popular non-English show on Netflix on the third and fourth week after its release.

=== Critical response ===
The show received positive remarks from critics for destroying misconceptions around Oriental bodies and expanding the definitions of strength. Some critics praised the show for "shattering the gender barrier" by showing women competing on par with elite male athletes, though others, such as Rachael Joo, an associate professor of American studies at Middlebury College, pointed out that the show coincided with a heightened attitude against gender equality in South Korea by designing stages favorable to those with a male body.

=== Controversies ===
While the production team stated that there was no rematch in the final game, semi-finalist Jung Hae-min claimed that the final game was filmed twice. In the initial match, the game was halted by Woo's complaints of the equipment and again halted by the production team to oil the machines. When Jung was about to win again, the production team asked to move to a different location, citing issues with audio recording.

Many viewers alleged on social media that there was steroid use among the contestants. Some viewers also alleged that one of the contestants, Kim Da-young, was a school bully, and claimed that it was ironic for her to appear on a show that is not supposed to condone violence.

=== In popular culture ===
On February 15, 2023, Netflix posted a tweet commending the women appearing on the show.

A TikTok challenge called the "hanging challenge", inspired by Quest 0 of the show, encourages participants to hang from a bar to test how long they can hold on. Participants often use the same hanging style of the show's contestants to hold on for a longer time.

== Accolades ==
=== Awards and nominations ===
Name of the award ceremony, year presented, category, nominee of the award, and the result of the nomination
Award ceremony	Year	Category	Nominee / Work	Result	Ref.
Baeksang Arts Awards	2023	Best Entertainment Program	Physical: 100	Nominated	
Asia Contents Awards & Global OTT Awards	2023	Best Reality & Variety	Physical: 100	Won	
Oriental Academy Creative Awards	2023	Best Non-Scripted Entertainment (Grand Final Winners)	Physical: 100	Won	
Oriental Academy Creative Awards	2023	Best Direction – Non-Fiction (National Winners – Korea)	Jang Ho-gi	Won	
Oriental Academy Creative Awards	2023	Best Non-Scripted Entertainment (National Winners – Korea)	Physical: 100	Won	

=== Listicles ===
Name of publisher, year listed, name of listicle, and placement
Publisher	Year	Listicle	Placement	Ref.
Entertainment Weekly	2025	The 21 best Korean shows on Netflix to watch now	Top 21	

== Adaptations ==
Title	Release date	Winner(s)	Ref.
Physical 100: Italy	September 11, 2026	Emanuele Bruno (Judo Champion)	
Physical 100: Mexico	September 16, 2026	Angel Quintero (Obstacle course racer)	
Physical 100: USA	TBA	TBA	
100% Physique France	TBA	TBA	
Physical 100: Sweden	TBA	TBA	
