= Physical 100: Italy =

Italian reality competition series

- Italian: Physical Italia: da 100 a 1
- Literally: Physical Italy: From 100 to 1
- Genre: Reality competition
- Based on: Physical: 100 by Jang Ho-gi
- Directed by: Alessio Pollacci
- Creative director: Tommaso Marazza
- Country of origin: Italy
- Original language: Italian
- No. of seasons: 1
- No. of episodes: 8

Production
- Executive producers: Luca Pennisi; Giampaolo Toselli
- Producer: Roberta Briguglia
- Cinematography: Ivan Pierri
- Editor: Enrico Marchese
- Production company: Endemol Shine Italy

Original release
- Network: Netflix
- Release: 11 September – 2 October 2026

Related
- Physical: 100; Physical: Asia; Physical 100: USA

Physical 100: Italy (Italian: Physical Italia: da 100 a 1) is an Italian reality competition series developed as a spin-off of Netflix's Physical: 100 franchise. The series follows 100 Italian participants competing in escalating physical challenges to determine a single winner. It premiered on Netflix on September 11, 2026.

== Participants ==
The casting process for Physical: 100: Italy involved a broad selection phase, comprising over 1,000 contacted candidates, 130 hours of Zoom auditions across 187 interviews, and 137 in-person callbacks. The final lineup features 100 contestants ranging in age from 22 to 60, representing a diverse mix of everyday backgrounds, fitness professionals, and high-profile public figures. Notable participants include Olympic gold medalist swimmer Federica Pellegrini, Olympic gymnast Jury Chechi, Olympic diver Tania Cagnotto, Olympic wrestling champion Andrea Minguzzi, former rugby international Mirco Bergamasco, television personality and former rugby player Alvise Rigo, actress and media personality Elisabetta Canalis, and content creator Luis Sal. Competitors span a wide variety of specialized athletic disciplines—ranging from triathlon, wrestling, and skeleton to niche and traditional sports such as Hyrox, American football, and Calcio storico fiorentino.

List of participants
Name	Occupation / known for
Sarah Abdessalem	Personal Trainer
Jessica Allegretti	Beach Volleyball · National Team
Noah Asemota	Fitness Trainer
Marco Begalli	Windsurfing Champion
Anastasia Bagaglini	Football Freestyle
Benedetto Ernesto Beltrame	Beach Volleyball Player
Beatrice Beni	Bodybuilder
Mirco Bergamasco	Rugby · National Team
Emanuele Biviano	CrossFit Athlete
Gianmarco Bollaro	Bodybuilder
Emanuele Bruno (Winner)	Judo Champion
Tania Cagnotto	Diving · Olympic Medalist
Giampaolo Calvaresi	Calisthenics Athlete
Elisabetta Canalis	Showgirl · Kickboxing
Francesco Casolari	Olympic Baseball Champion
Marco Cavanna	Fitness Trainer
Federica Cesarini	Rowing · Olympic Gold
Pietro Checchi	Stuntman & Influencer
Jury Chechi	Gymnast
Paola Ciabattoni	Padel Champion
Georgian Cimpeanu	Kickboxing · World Champion
Andrea Cingolani	Gymnast
Guglielmo Coiro	Bodybuilder
Camilla Contesso	Hyrox Athlete
Nicholas Cornia	Fitness Influencer
Sofia Costantini	Influencer
Riccardo Croci	Bodybuilding Champion
Elisabetta D'Ambruoso	German Teacher & Opera Singer
Lorenzo Dalle Piagge	American Football · Former National Team
Jobel De Castro	Calcio Storico Fiorentino Player
Valentina De Gregori	Bodybuilder and Powerlifter
Raffaele Del Piano	Fitness Influencer
Sara Del Prete	Personal Trainer
Manuel Di Bernardo	Model
Gabriele Di Via	Factory Worker & Bodybuilder
Giulio Domi	DJ
Simone Etere	Calisthenics Athlete
Giulia Fabbo	Handball
Gennaro Farella	Personal Trainer
Martina Farina	Italy Rugby National Team
Alessandra Fior	Triathlete (Ironman)
Rosalba Forciniti	Judo · Olympic Medalist
Sonia Fracassi	Boxer
Tommaso Fragassi	Mr. Universe
Elisa Fuliano	CrossFit · Italian Champion
Sabrina Giungi	Judo Champion
Paolo Innocenti	Personal Trainer
Andrea Invernizzi	Italian Strongman Champion
Abou Kane	Dancer
Sara Lisanti	Trapeze Artist
Manuel Lombardo	Judo
Erik Lugli	Calisthenics Athlete
Stefano Malaguti	CrossFit
Valentina Margaglio	Skeleton · National Team
Paolo Masella	Butcher
Giovanni Masiero	Influencer
Ithocor Meloni	Runner
Andrea Miccio	Bodybuilding · World Champion
Stefano Migliorini	CrossFit Games Athlete
Andrea Minguzzi	Olympic Gold · Wrestling
Cristian Bilardi	Breakdance
Federica Murgia	Personal Trainer
Tommaso Nisi	Firefighter
Sebastiano Occhipinti	Truck Driver
Mauro Oldani	Powerlifter
Veronica Paladino	CrossFit Athlete
Luca Palla	Hyrox Athlete
Tommaso Pampinella	Stand-Up Paddle Champion
Edoardo Papa	Italian Surf Champion
Federica Pellegrini	Swimming
Luca Pescollderungg	Spartan Race · World Champion
Elisa Piccicuto	Military Coach
Caterina Piccirilli	Sports Influencer
Filippo Pici	Calisthenics & Powerlifting Athlete
Simone Ponti	Former Paratrooper
Sofia Pronesti	StuntWoman
Semiljana Rexhepi	Hyrox Athlete
Alvise Rigo	Rugby · TV Personality
Sebastian Denham Rodwell	Calcio Storico Fiorentino Player
Samuele Rossi	Swimmer
Federico Rotoni	MMA Fighter
Luis Sal	Content Creator
Ivano Salerno	MMA Fighter
Giuseppe Santamaria	Fire Juggler
Matteo Sartori	Footballer
Daniele Scatizzi	MMA Fighter
Valentina Scatizzi	MMA Fighter
Mattia Schinco	Breakdancer
Assunta "Susy" Scutto	Judo · World Champion
Chiara Sergi	Dancer
Alice Sganzerla	Fitness Trainer
Claudio Sona	Fitness Influencer
Sara Sordini	Fitness Trainer
Stefania Susca	Sports Influencer
Matteo Tedesco	Bodybuilder
Mauro Tommasi	DJ
Luigi Osagie Turetti	Dancer
Alice Veniani	Powerlifter
Valentina Vernia	Model • Dancer
Gaggi Yatarov	Calisthenics Athlete

== Premise ==
The series will follow the format of the original South Korean version, featuring 100 Italian contestants from various athletic backgrounds competing in a series of demanding physical challenges. The goal is to be the last competitor standing, claiming a cash prize and the title of possessing the "most perfect body".

== Production ==
=== Development ===
On July 28, 2025, Netflix officially announced the Italian adaptation of Physical: 100 through its official media platform, About Netflix. The announcement was reported by major entertainment industry publications including Deadline. The Italian version is part of Netflix's broader expansion of the Physical: 100 franchise following the success of the original Korean series and other international adaptations.

== Release ==
Physical: 100: Italy premiered on Netflix on 11 September 2026.

== See also ==
- Physical: 100
- Physical 100: USA
- Physical: Asia
