= Justin John Harvey =

South African actor (born 1991)

- Born: March 27, 1991 (age 35); Bloemfontein, South Africa
- Education: Law School of University of Pretoria
- Occupations: Actor; Model
- Years active: 2019–present
- Agent: Andmarq
- Website: agent's website

Justin John Harvey (Korean: 저스틴 하비; born March 27, 1991) is a South African model, actor and television personality based in South Korea. He is known for Season 2 of Netflix show Physical: 100.

He obtained a law degree before relocating to South Korea at the age of 24 to pursue modeling. He has since become active in entertainment, films and commercials. Harvey is most recognized for his role in Park Hoon-jung's 2022 film The Witch: Part 2 - The Other One. He has also appeared in Ashfall (2020) and The Childe (2023). He has also made appearances on various variety shows, including the popular television shows Welcome, First Time in Korea? and South Korean Foreigners.

== Early life ==
Justin John Harvey was born on March 27, 1991, in Bloemfontein, South Africa. When he was six, Harvey and his mother moved to the East Rand in Gauteng following his parents' divorce. Harvey enjoyed playing rugby and cricket as a child. His interest in acting began at the age of seven through school plays in elementary school. In high school, he choreographed and directed plays. However, Harvey chose law as major at the University of Pretoria, thinking it was a safer career path. However, his dream of becoming an actor remained.

== Career ==
Harvey arrived in South Korea at the age of 24, intending a short-term visit. He became captivated by the country and decided to stay permanently. He enrolled in a formal Korean language school for a month before deciding to teach himself the language, fully immersing himself in the process. Even when learning new skills such as yoga or scuba diving, he opted for lessons conducted in Korean.

In 2019, Harvey made his television debut on the MBC Every 1 reality show "Welcome, First Time in Korea". The show, along with "South Korean Foreigners", aired in 2020. "Welcome, First Time in Korea" features a foreigner living in South Korea who invites friends from their home country to visit for the first time, while "South Korean Foreigners" pits 10 non-Koreans against five Koreans in a competition. These programs have helped many foreigners gain recognition and become TV personalities in South Korea.

In the same year, while walking along the Han River banks with his parents, Harvey saw a citizen jump into the river. He immediately jumped in and saved the person's life before the rescue team arrived. For this action, the Yeongdeungpo Fire Department awarded him a Civilian Meritorious Service Award.

In 2021, based on the same lifesaving actions, Harvey was recommended for another commendation. That year, on December 1, he was granted an honorary citizenship by the then-mayor of Seoul, Oh Se-hoon, at the '2021 Foreigner Honourable Citizen Certificate Award Ceremony' held at Seoul City Hall. Out of 32 foreigner nominees from 24 countries, he was one of the 9 winners selected for this honor after a review process by the judging committee. He made history as first South African receiving the honor.

In 2022, following years of modeling and television appearances, he secured a role in the sci-fi horror film The Witch: Part 2 - The Other One. Initially, Harvey believed he got the role of Tom due to his Korean language abilities, despite his limited experience. However, director Park Hoon-jung later revealed that Harvey embodied the Tom he had envisioned, even though Harvey had to gain 10 kilograms for the role. Harvey worked again with Director Park Hoon-jung in his 2023 action film The Childe as a Western man who makes Marco an offer in a bar.

In 2024, Harvey appeared in Netflix entertainment show Physical: 100 Season 2 - Underground, a competition featuring 100 individuals showcasing their physical strength to determine the ultimate champion with the most perfect physique. Harvey showed his strength by landing in the TOP 4 after a fierce competition in the first-come, first-served roller race.

== Filmography ==
=== Feature film ===
Feature films
Year	Title		Role	Ref.
Year	English	Korean	Role	Ref.
2022	Ashfall	백두산	Sniper	
2022	The Witch: Part 2. The Other One	마녀 2: the other one	Tom	
2023	The Childe	귀공자		

=== Web series ===
Web series credit
Year	Title		Role	Ref.
Year	English	Korean	Role	Ref.
2024	The Tyrant	폭군	Crocodile 1, Paul's enhanced, super-human right hand	
2025	Newtopia	뉴토피아	Chef Paolo	

=== Television and web shows ===
Year	Title	Role	Notes	Ref.
2019–2020	MBC every1 South Korean Foreigners	Contestant		
2021	MBC every1 Welcome, First Time in Korea?	Cast member		
2022	MBC every1 Welcome, First Time in Korea life?	Cast Member		
2024	Physical: 100	Contestant	Season 2, Rank 4th	
2024	Zombieverse: New blood	Contestant	Season 2	
2025	Knowing International High School	Cast member		

== Accolades ==
=== State honors ===
Name of country, award ceremony, year given, and name of honor
Country	Award Ceremony	Year	Honor	Ref.
South Korea	Yeongdeungpo Fire Departement	2019	Civilian Meritorious Service Award	
South Korea	The Seoul Metropolitan Government's; Foreigner Honorary Citizenship (Note: The Seoul Metropolitan Government's Foreigner Honorary Citizenship System began in 1958 by awarding 'Citizens of Merit' to foreigners who helped rebuild the city. A total of 891 honorary citizens from 100 countries have been selected so far. Candidates for the honorary citizenship certificate are recommended through embassies, heads of public institutions, heads of social organizations, and petitions from 30 or more citizens, and are then selected after an independent review committee's review and the final approval of the Seoul Metropolitan Council.)	2021	Seoul Honorary Citizen	
