= Extreme Tour (TV program) =

South Korean television show

- Promotional poster
- Hangul: 극한투어
- RR: Geukhan tueo
- MR: Kŭkhan t'uŏ
- Genre: Travel, Reality show
- Written by: Jeong Ji-sook; Bae Gu-seul
- Directed by: Yoo Soo-yeon; Baek Soo-jin
- Starring: Park Myung-soo; Cho Sae-ho; Lee Eun-ji; Kang Ji-young
- Country of origin: South Korea
- Original language: Korean
- No. of seasons: 1
- No. of episodes: 8

Production
- Running time: 90 minutes
- Production company: NAKA

Original release
- Network: JTBC
- Release: September 22 – November 10, 2024

Extreme Tour (Korean: 극한투어; RR: Geukhan tueo) is a South Korean television program produced by NAKA Company and broadcast on JTBC channel.

The show aired every Sunday at 22:30 (KST) from September 22 to October 6, 2024, and then changed its time slot to 21:00 (KST) from October 13 to November 10, 2024.

== Overview ==
Extreme Tour is a program that showcases the fun of traveling to extreme destinations hidden around the world that are usually only seen on social media, alternating between extreme hell and extreme paradise. The main hosts are Park Myung-soo, Cho Sae-ho, Lee Eun-ji, and JTBC's announcer Kang Ji-young. The cast choose their own destinations and travel companions to enjoy a high-stimulation experimental trip.

== Episodes ==
Ep.	Original broadcast date	Location	Cast	Ref.
1	September 22, 2024	Chongqing, China	Park Myung-soo; Gabee	
1	September 22, 2024	Bangkok, Thailand	Lee Eun-ji; Lip J	
2	September 29, 2024	Bangkok, Chiang Mai, Thailand	Lee Eun-ji; Lip J	
2	September 29, 2024	Taipei, Taiwan	Nam Hee-doo; Lee Na-yeon	
3	October 6, 2024	Ankara, Istanbul, Turkey	Cho Sae-ho; Jang Wooyoung	
3	October 6, 2024	Chongqing, China	Park Myung-soo; Gabee	
4	October 13, 2024	Chiang Mai, Thailand	Lee Eun-ji; Lip J	
4	October 13, 2024	Ankara, Istanbul, Turkey	Cho Sae-ho; Jang Wooyoung	
5	October 20, 2024	Colombo, Sri Lanka	Kang Ji-young	
5	October 20, 2024	Istanbul, Turkey	Cho Sae-ho; Jang Wooyoung	
6	October 27, 2024	Dambulla, Sri Lanka	Kang Ji-young; Jay (world traveler)	
6	October 27, 2024	Laguna, Philippines	Lee Gwan-hee; Amotti	
7	November 3, 2024	Haputale, Sri Lanka	Kang Ji-young; Jay (world traveler)	
7	November 3, 2024	Istanbul, Turkey	Cho Sae-ho; Jang Wooyoung	
8	November 10, 2024	Laguna, Philippines	Lee Gwan-hee; Amotti	
8	November 10, 2024	Taichung, Taiwan	Nam Hee-doo; Lee Na-yeon	

== Ratings ==
Ep.	Original broadcast date	Average audience share (Nielsen Korea)
Ep.	Original broadcast date	Nationwide
1	September 22, 2024	1.792%
2	September 29, 2024	1.270%
3	October 6, 2024	1.531%
4	October 13, 2024	1.36%
5	October 20, 2024	2.148%
6	October 27, 2024	1.424%
7	November 3, 2024	1.687%
8	November 10, 2024	1.085%
Average		1.537%
In the table above, the blue numbers represent the lowest ratings and the red numbers represent the highest ratings.; This show airs on a cable channel/pay TV which normally has a relatively smaller audience compared to free-to-air TV/public broadcasters (KBS, SBS, MBC & EBS).
