= Jason Tan =

English mixed martial arts fighter

- Born: 1982 (age 43–44); Liverpool, England
- Height: 5 ft 10 in (1.78 m)
- Weight: 170 lb (77 kg; 12 st)
- Division: Welterweight
- Reach: 69 in (180 cm)
- Fighting out of: Liverpool, England
- Team: The MMA Academy
- Rank: Black belt in Brazilian Jiu-Jitsu
- Years active: 2005–2008

Mixed martial arts record
- Total: 8
- Wins: 5
- By knockout: 1
- By submission: 2
- By decision: 2
- Losses: 3
- By knockout: 2
- By decision: 1

Other information
- Mixed martial arts record from Sherdog

Jason Tan (born 1982) is an English retired mixed martial artist and head coach of MMA academy Liverpool. He formerly competed in the welterweight division of the Ultimate Fighting Championship.

== Biography ==
Tan started out in kickboxing at the age of 15 before studying Brazilian jiu-jitsu and MMA. It is said in previous interviews that Tan's inspiration to study Jiu Jitsu and MMA was through watching Rickson Gracie's Choke documentary.

Tan has travelled extensively to pursue training in mixed martial arts. He has trained with Brazilian jiu-jitsu black belt and Pride Veteran Chris Brennan at the original Next Generation Fighting Academy, California. On his return to the United Kingdom, Tan co-created Next Generation MMA UK in Liverpool. Tan currently teaches and trains at The MMA Academy Liverpool with Thai Boxing Champion Peter Davies.

On 5 December 2012, Tan was awarded his black belt in Brazilian jiu-jitsu from SBGi Vice President and BJJ Black Belt Karl Tanswell of SBG Mainline, Manchester.

== Mixed martial arts career ==
Tan began his career on the local show in Liverpool, known as Cage Fighting Championships & Cage Gladiators, defeating opponents such as Joey Van Wanrooy and Leslee Ojugbana. At this time Tan was not a prominent figure on the British MMA scene as he was only fighting in local shows. However this changed when he agreed to fight London's Alex Reid at the Manchester Evening News Arena on the "WCFC: No Guts, No Glory" event. Tan took the fight on two hours notice and some interviews state that he was actually in the middle of a McDonald's feast when he received the call. Tan dominated the fight both standing and on the ground earning a decision victory. Tan's first defeat came against Jim Wallhead who hails from Leicester and is a part of Team Rough House in Nottingham. Over a tough three round battle the judges scored a split decision victory for Wallhead.

Tan had to take time off after the Wallhead fight due to a knee injury and was not able to compete until mid-2007. Tan signed with the UFC in 2007. In his debut he fought at UFC 72 against former pro boxer Marcus Davis. Tan came out with sharp Muay Thai skills landing leg kicks and high kicks on Davis. However a brief exchange from the pair saw Tan get dropped by a right hook which prompted Davis to land further shots before referee Yves Lavigne stopped the bout at 1:15 of the first round.

Tan came back stronger defeating Brazilian jiu-jitsu black belt Alexandre Izidro. Izidro was a recognized fighter in the UK and the former Cage Warriors Lightweight Champion. Tan dominated the fight outstriking Izidro on the feet and landing effective ground and pound from the top on the ground, where he had him in an armbar. Tan took a unanimous decision.

Tan returned to the UFC in 2008, facing undefeated Korean fighter Dong Hyun Kim at UFC 84. He lost via TKO (elbows) in the third round. He then gave up his fighting career after just three years, deciding it wasn't worth the physical injury.

== Mixed martial arts record ==
Professional record breakdown
8 matches	5 wins	3 losses
By knockout	1	2
By submission	2	0
By decision	2	1

Res.	Record	Opponent	Method	Event	Date	Round	Time	Location	Notes
Loss	5–3	Dong Hyun Kim	KO (elbows)	UFC 84	24 May 2008	3	0:25	Las Vegas, Nevada, United States	
Win	5–2	Alexandre Izidro	Decision (unanimous)	CG 4 – Cage Gladiators 4	5 August 2007	3	5:00	Liverpool, England	
Loss	4–2	Marcus Davis	KO (punch)	UFC 72	16 June 2007	1	1:15	Belfast, Northern Ireland	
Loss	4–1	Jim Wallhead	Decision (split)	CG II – The Next Generation	3 September 2006	3	5:00	Liverpool, England	
Win	4–0	Joey Van Wanrooij	Submission (triangle choke)	CG 1 – Cage Gladiators 1	22 May 2006	1	1:46	Liverpool, England	
Win	3–0	Alex Reid	Decision (split)	WCFC – No Guts No Glory	18 March 2006	3	5:00	Manchester, England	
Win	2–0	Leslee Ojugbana	Submission (triangle choke)	CFC 4 – Cage Carnage	3 July 2005	1	4:56	Liverpool, England	
Win	1–0	Brian Moore	TKO (punches)	CFC 3 – Cage Carnage	6 March 2005	1	N/A	Liverpool, England	
