= Park Jin-yong =

South Korean luger (born 1993)

Park Jin-yong l
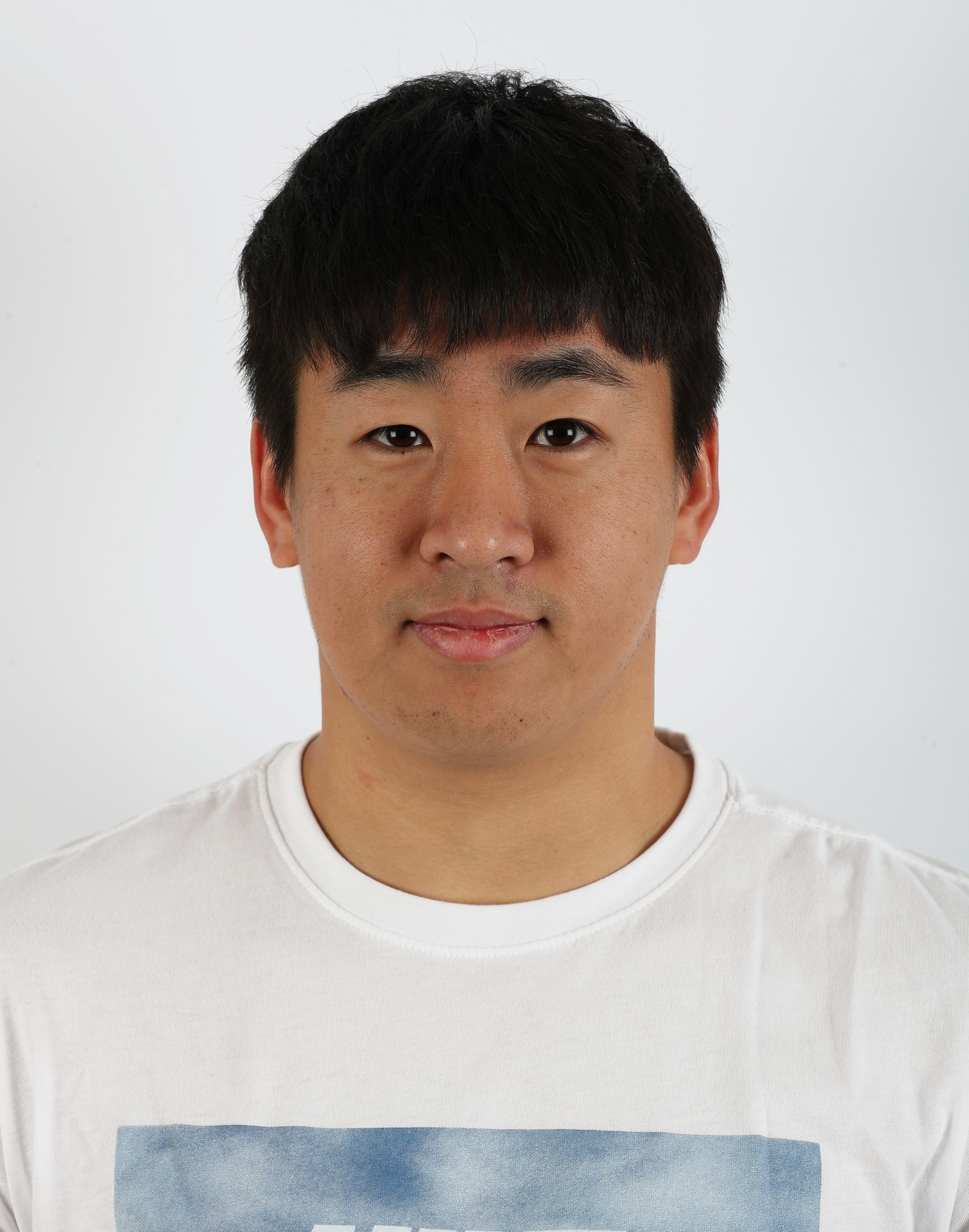
- Park in 2018

Personal information
- Nationality: South Korean
- Born: 17 November 1993 (age 32) Muju, South Korea
- Height: 1.79 m (5 ft 10 in)
- Weight: 90 kg (198 lb)

Sport
- Country: South Korea
- Sport: Luge
- Event: Doubles

Korean name
- Hangul: 박진용
- RR: Bak Jinyong
- MR: Pak Chinyong

Park Jin-yong (born 17 November 1993 in Muju) is a South Korean luger.

Park competed at the 2014 Winter Olympics for South Korea. In the men's doubles event he competed with Cho Jung-myung, finishing 18th. He was also a part of the South Korean relay team, which finished 12th.

As of September 2014, Park's best performance at the FIL World Luge Championships is 23rd, in the 2013 Championships.

As of September 2014, Park's best Luge World Cup overall finish is 30th in 2013–14.

Park was a contestant in the 2023 Netflix reality competition Physical: 100. He was one of the five survivors who competed in the final quest and finished in third place.

== Education ==
- Muju Sulchon High School
