= Physical 100: USA =

American reality competition television series

- Genre: Reality competition; Survival; Variety show
- Created by: Jang Ho-gi
- Based on: Physical: 100 by Jang Ho-gi
- Country of origin: United States
- Original language: English

Production
- Executive producers: Arthur Smith; David Friedman; Anthony Storm; Eli Baldrige
- Production company: A. Smith & Co. Productions

Original release
- Network: Netflix

Related
- Physical: 100; Physical: Asia; Physical 100: Italy

Physical 100: USA is an upcoming American reality competition series based on the South Korean series of the same name. The series will feature 100 contestants competing in various challenges to win a cash prize and claim the title of the most perfect physique.

== Premise ==
Similar to the original South Korean version, Physical 100: USA will pit 100 contestants from diverse athletic backgrounds against each other in a series of grueling challenges designed to test their physical prowess, strength, endurance, agility, and strategy. The contestants will compete to survive elimination and be the last one standing, winning a cash prize.

== Production ==
=== Development ===
On May 8, 2024, Netflix officially announced the development of an American version of its hit South Korean survival show, Physical: 100, during its upfront presentation to advertisers. The announcement confirmed that the series would join Netflix's expanding slate of global reality franchises.

=== Casting ===
Open casting calls for the series were announced concurrently with the series' development announcement. Netflix is seeking "incredible American athletes and physical specimens" for the show.

== Shooting ==
Shooting began in late July 2026 in Toronto, Canada.

== Release ==
Physical: 100: USA is scheduled to be released on the streaming service Netflix. A specific release date has not yet been announced.

== See also ==
- Physical: 100
- List of Netflix original programming
