= Muscle Farmers =

South Korean television show

- Promotional poster
- Hangul: 헬스파머
- RR: Helseu pameo
- MR: Helsŭ p'amŏ
- Genre: Variety, Reality show
- Written by: Choi Jin-su
- Directed by: Park Sang-hyuk; Kim Kwan-tae
- Starring: Choo Sung-hoon; Heo Kyung-hwan; Jong Tae-se; Amotti; Baekho
- Country of origin: South Korea
- Original language: Korean
- No. of seasons: 1
- No. of episodes: 9

Production
- Producer: Kim Baek-sun
- Running time: 90 minutes
- Production companies: tvN, CJ ENM

Original release
- Network: tvN
- Release: December 21, 2025 – February 15, 2026

Muscle Farmers (Korean: 헬스파머; RR: Helseu pameo) is a South Korean television program produced by CJ ENM and airs on tvN. About five physical strength entertainers help with farming work by harvesting various crops. It stars Choo Sung-hoon, Heo Kyung-hwan, Jong Tae-se, Amotti, and Baekho.

The program aired on Sunday at 19:40 (KST) from December 21, 2025, to February 15, 2026.

== Synopsis ==
Due to labor shortages in rural areas caused by rapid population aging, the show follows physically fit Korean celebrities as they leave their gym routines behind to take part in hands-on farming projects, providing manual labor in places where machinery cannot fully replace human work.

== Cast ==
- Choo Sung-hoon
- Heo Kyung-hwan
- Jong Tae-se
- Amotti
- Baekho

== Episodes ==
Ep.	Original broadcast date	Location	Guest	Ref.
1	December 21, 2025	Jeongseon, Gangwon		
2	December 28, 2025	Jeongseon, Gangwon		
3	January 4, 2026	Jangheung, South Jeolla	Park Hae-jin	
4	January 11, 2026	Goseong, South Gyeongsang	Yoon Shi-yoon	
5	January 18, 2026	Goseong, South Gyeongsang	Yoon Shi-yoon	
6	January 25, 2026	Uiseong, Gyeongsangbuk-do	Joon Park	
7	February 1, 2026	Uiseong, Gyeongsangbuk-do	Kim Jae-joong	
8	February 8, 2026	Yeoju, Gyeonggi	Lee Joon	
9	February 15, 2026	Siheung, Gyeonggi	Lee Joon	

== Ratings ==
Ep.	Original broadcast date	Average audience share (Nielsen Korea)	
Ep.	Original broadcast date	Nationwide	Seoul
1	December 21, 2025	1.816%	1.386%
2	December 28, 2025	1.7%	1.52%
3	January 4, 2026	1.3%	-
4	January 11, 2026	1.3%	-
5	January 18, 2026	1%	-
6	January 25, 2026	1.3%	1.359%
7	February 1, 2026	1.582%	1.65%
8	February 8, 2026	1.781%	1.874%
9	February 15, 2026	1.2%	-
Average		1.44%	0.87%
In the table above, the blue numbers represent the lowest ratings and the red numbers represent the highest ratings.; This show airs on a cable channel/pay TV which normally has a relatively smaller audience compared to free-to-air TV/public broadcasters (KBS, SBS, MBC & EBS).
