= Kim Sik =

South Korean bobsledder

Personal information
- Nationality: South Korean
- Born: 17 November 1985 (age 40) Jangheung-gun, South Korea
- Height: 1.84 m (6 ft 0 in)
- Weight: 100 kg (220 lb)

Sport
- Country: South Korea
- Sport: Bobsleigh

Kim Sik (born November 17, 1985 in Jangheung-gun) is a South Korean bobsledder.

Kim competed at the 2014 Winter Olympics for South Korea. He teamed with driver Kim Dong-hyun, Kim Kyung-hyun and Oh Jea-han as the South Korea-2 sled in the four-man event, finishing 28th.

As of April 2014, his best showing at the World Championships is 17th, in the four-man event in 2012.

Kim made his World Cup debut in February 2012. As of April 2014, his best World Cup finish is 13th, in 2011-12 at Whistler.

Kim was a contestant in the 2023 Netflix reality competition Physical: 100.
