= Amotti =

South Korean CrossFitter (born 1992)

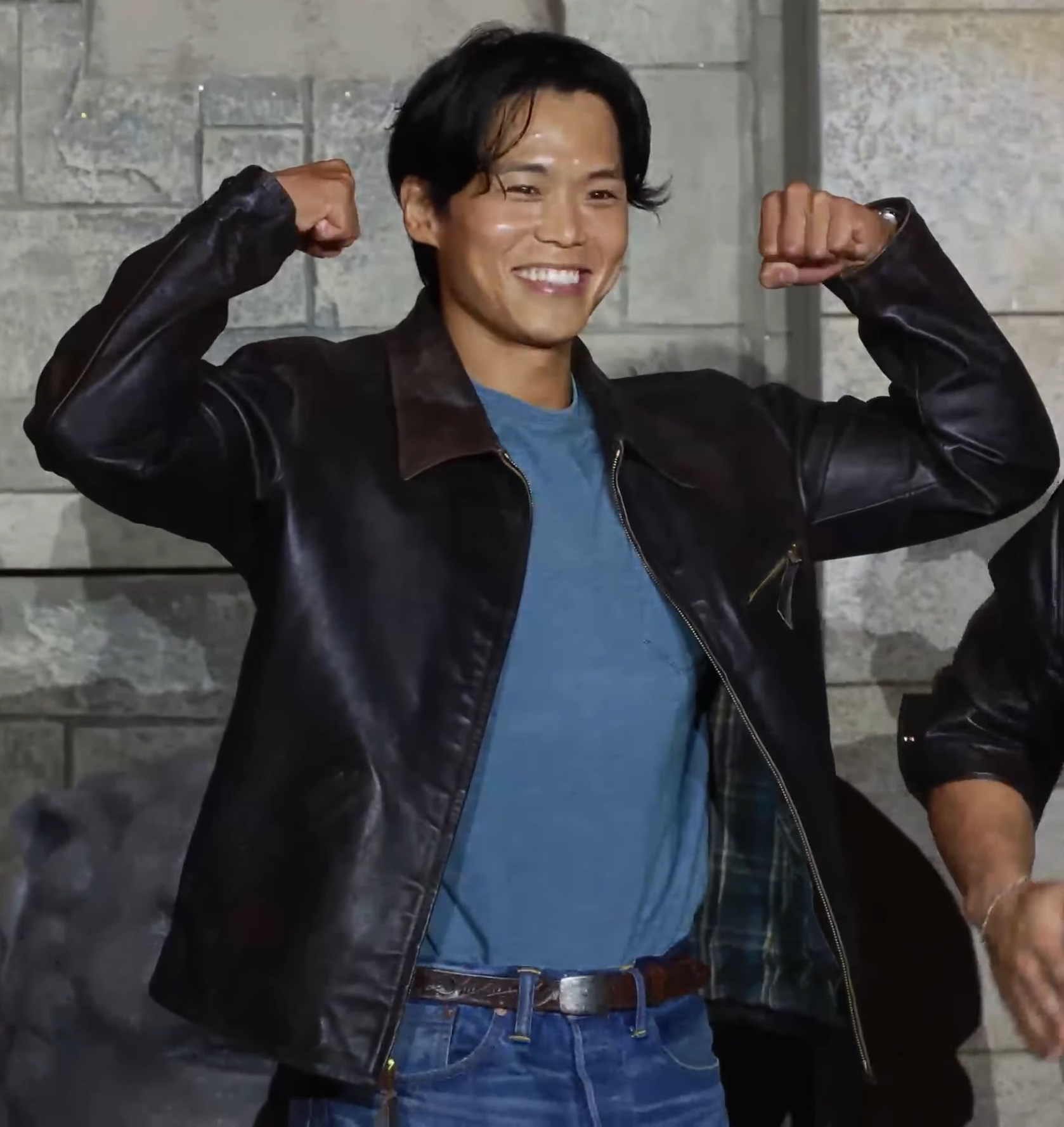
- Amotti in October 2025 for Physical: Asia
- Born: Kim Jae-hong; November 9, 1992 (age 33); Daegu, South Korea
- Other name: Amotti
- Education: Yeungnam University (College of Physical Education)
- Occupations: YouTuber; Entertainer
- Years active: 2024–present
- Agent: BONBOOENT

YouTube information
- Channel: 아모띠 amotti
- Subscribers: 402,000
- Views: 89 million
- Last updated: 8 June 2026
- Website: www.bonbooent.com/artists/amotti/profile.html

Kim Jae-hong (Korean: 김재홍; born November 9, 1992) better known as Amotti (아모띠) is a former South Korean CrossFitter, YouTuber and the winner of Netflix show Physical: 100 Season 2 – Underground (2024)

== Biography ==
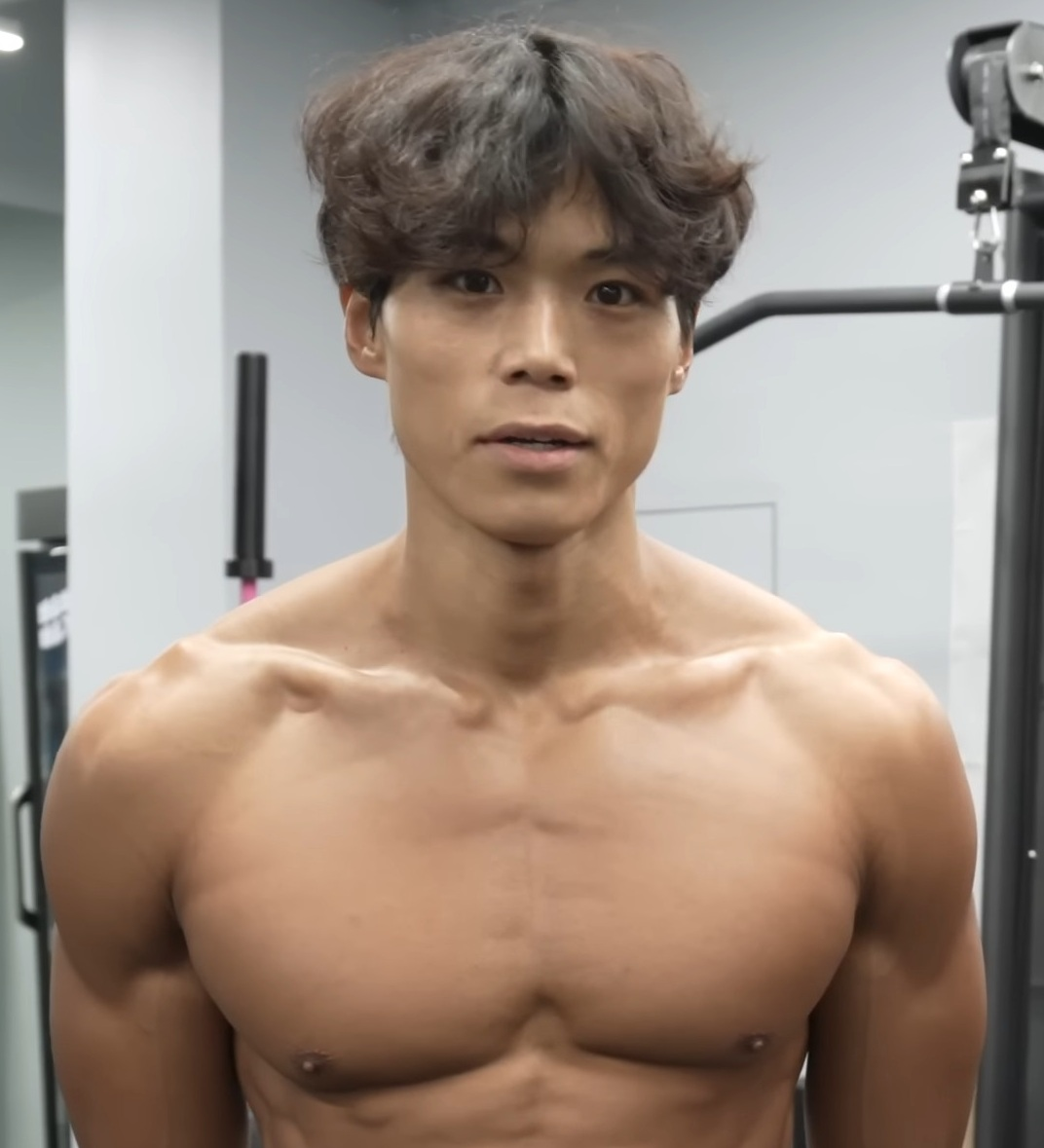
Amotti in December 2022

Amotti was born on November 9, 1992 in Daegu, South Korea. He graduated from the College of Physical Education at Yeungnam University. He served mandatory military service in the Republic of Korea Marine Corps and was discharged in 2013.

On August 17, 2024, Amotti held a wedding ceremony with his non-celebrity girlfriend in Seoul, South Korea. On May 19, 2026, the couple welcomed their daughter, Kim San-ha.

=== Career ===
In December 2013, Amotti started CrossFit after his military service. In 2019, Amotti placed 6th in the CrossFit Open and finished 2nd in the Asia Championship. On May 26, 2020, Amotti launched his YouTube channel, where he began uploading vlog videos focusing on exercising and his daily life. In 2021, Amotti was cast in the reality show Steel Troops, but he had to withdraw after being involved in a car accident 2 weeks before filming began. Amotti has been working with Lululemon since 2021; in June 2024, he was announced as a South Korean brand ambassador for that company.

After a car accident in January 2021, he retired from Crossfitter and competition and transitioned into being a fitness YouTuber. In 2023, Amotti won the bodybuilding competition Show Me the Body, receiving a prize of 20 million won. He was nearly selected to participate in Physical: 100 Season 1 but did not make the final cast. In 2024, Amotti participated in the Netflix show Physical: 100 Season 2. Although he was eliminated in Quest 2: Maze Race, he was brought back into the competition after being chosen by Jung Ji-hyun from Quest 2.5: Pillar Challenge. He made it to the final round and won the show against Hong Beom-seok. On April 3, Amotti signed an exclusive contract with BONBOOENT, joining a lineup that includes Chu Sung-hoon, Kim Dong-hyun and others.

In 2025, Amotti joined Netflix show, Physical: Asia in Team South Korea and tvN new variety show, Muscle Farmers. He is set to appear in another tvN survival show, Synchro Game, teamed up with Lee Si-won.

== Filmography ==
=== Television shows ===
Year	Title	Role	Notes	Ref.
2024	King of Survival: Tribal War	Cast Member		
2024	Extreme Tour	Cast Member		
2025	Muscle Farmers	Cast Member		
2026	Synchro Game	Contestant		

=== Web shows ===
Year	Title	Role	Notes	Ref.
2024	Physical: 100 Season 2 – Underground	Contestant	Winner	
2025	Physical: Asia	Contestant	Winner	
2025	Physical: Welcome to Mongolia	Cast Member		
