= Erdene-Ochiryn Lkhagva-Ochir =

Mongolian contortionist

- Born: 14 October 1987 (age 38); Mongolia
- Occupations: model; actor; contortionist
- Website: https://www.lkhagvaochir.com/about

Erdene-Ochiryn Lkhagva-Ochir (Mongolian: Эрдэнэ-Очирын Лхагва-Очир ᠡᠷᠳᠡᠨᠢ-ᠸᠴᠢᠷ ᠤ᠋ᠨ ᡀᠠᠭᠪᠠ-ᠸᠴᠢᠷ; born 14 October 1987) is a Mongolian model, actor, Cirque du Soleil performer and contortionist.

== Career ==
He is featured in the Netflix 2025 series Physical: Asia, where he represented Team Mongolia.

In 2024, Lkhagva-Ochir received the Golden Star Trophy at the 22nd Festival International du Cirque de Grenoble, held in Grenoble, France. He performed a complex chair balancing routine at a height of 11 metres.

In 2021, he also won a gold medal at the 12th World Bodybuilding and Physique Sports Championships, Men’s Fitness Physique - Open Category, in the Republic of Uzbekistan.

In 2012, Lkhagva-Ochir received the Golden Trophy at the 4th International Circus Festival, held in Hanoi, Vietnam.

== Filmography ==
=== Web shows ===
Year	Title	Role	Notes	Ref.
2025	Physical: Asia	Contestant	Netflix	
