= UFC 84 =

UFC mixed martial arts event in 2008

UFC 84: Ill Will
- The poster for UFC 84: Ill Will
- Promotion: Ultimate Fighting Championship
- Date: May 24, 2008
- Venue: MGM Grand Garden Arena
- City: Paradise, Nevada
- Attendance: 14,773 (13,448 paid)
- Total gate: $3,732,000
- Buyrate: 475,000

Event chronology
UFC 83: Serra vs St-Pierre 2	UFC 84: Ill Will	UFC 85: Bedlam

UFC 84: Ill Will was a mixed martial arts event held by the Ultimate Fighting Championship (UFC) on May 24, 2008, at the MGM Grand Garden Arena in the Las Vegas suburb of Paradise, Nevada.

== Background ==
The card featured the return of Sean Sherk, who was suspended and stripped of his UFC Lightweight Championship after he tested positive for steroids at UFC 73.

This event also marked the last appearance of Tito Ortiz in the UFC for well over a year, as he was at the end of his contract and due to his feud with Dana White was not expected to re-sign at the time.

This event also marked the UFC debut of future UFC Interim Heavyweight Champion Shane Carwin.

This event was awarded Sherdog's 2008 Event of the Year.

== Results ==
Main card (PPV)
Weight class				Method	Round	Time	Notes
Lightweight	B.J. Penn (c)	def.	Sean Sherk	TKO (flying knee and punches)	3	5:00	(Note: For the UFC Lightweight Championship.)
Light Heavyweight	Wanderlei Silva	def.	Keith Jardine	KO (punches)	1	0:36
Light Heavyweight	Goran Reljic	def.	Wilson Gouveia	TKO (punches)	2	3:15
Light Heavyweight	Lyoto Machida	def.	Tito Ortiz	Decision (unanimous) (30–27, 30–27, 30–27)	3	5:00
Light Heavyweight	Thiago Silva	def.	Antonio Mendes	TKO (punches)	1	2:24
Preliminary card
Middleweight	Rousimar Palhares	def.	Ivan Salaverry	Submission (armbar)	1	2:36
Light Heavyweight	Rameau Thierry Sokoudjou	def.	Kazuhiro Nakamura	TKO (leg injury)	1	5:00
Lightweight	Rich Clementi	def.	Terry Etim	Decision (unanimous) (29–28, 29–28, 29–28)	3	5:00
Welterweight	Yoshiyuki Yoshida	def.	Jon Koppenhaver	Technical Submission (anaconda choke)	1	0:56
Welterweight	Kim Dong-hyun	def.	Jason Tan	TKO (elbows)	3	0:25
Heavyweight	Shane Carwin	def.	Christian Wellisch	TKO (punch)	1	0:44

== Bonus awards ==
The following fighters received $75,000 bonuses.

- Fight of the Night: Wilson Gouveia vs. Goran Reljic
- Knockout of the Night: Wanderlei Silva
- Submission of the Night: Rousimar Palhares

== Reported payout ==
- B.J. Penn ($250,000) def. Sean Sherk ($35,000)
- Wanderlei Silva ($150,000) def. Keith Jardine ($10,000)
- Lyoto Machida ($100,000) def. Tito Ortiz ($210,000)
- Goran Reljic ($6,000) def. Wilson Gouveia ($18,000)
- Sokoudjou ($80,000) def. Kazuhiro Nakamura ($20,000)
- Thiago Silva ($50,000) def. Antonio Mendes ($4,000)
- Rousimar Palhares ($10,000) def. Ivan Salaverry ($20,000)
- Yoshiyuki Yoshida ($12,000) def. Jon Koppenhaver ($8,000)
- Rich Clementi ($40,000) def. Terry Etim ($10,000)
- Dong Hyun Kim ($40,000) def. Jason Tan ($3,000)
- Shane Carwin ($12,000) def. Christian Wellisch ($10,000)

This does not include fighter bonuses

Total: $1,098,000

== See also ==
- Ultimate Fighting Championship
- List of UFC champions
- List of UFC events
- 2008 in UFC
