= Fina Phillipe =

Indonesian athlete and television personality (born 1990)

Personal information
- Full name: La Tania Finanda Phillipe Putri
- Nationality: Indonesian
- Born: 8 May 1990 (age 36) Jakarta, Indonesia

Sport
- Sport: Brazilian jiu-jitsu
- Rank: Purple belt in Brazilian jiu-jitsu
- Team: Kemang Jiu Jitsu (Grappling Fighting Team Indonesia)

Fina Phillipe (born 8 May 1990) is an Indonesian Brazilian jiu-jitsu athlete, television personality, and actor.

== Biography ==
Phillipe, whose full name is La Tania Finanda Phillipe Putri was born on 8 May 1990 in Jakarta, Indonesia. She has indonesian and Filipino ancestry. She graduated from the University of Indonesia.

== Career ==
In 2014, Phillipe began her career as a TV presenter. In 2015, Phillipe starred in the Indonesian film Silent Hero(es).

=== Jiujitsu career ===
Phillipe started learning jiujitsu to defend herself against crime. She participated in the 2019 Brazilian jiu-jitsu Open

On 12 November 2021, she participated in the world championship at the 2021 World Master International Brazilian Jiu-Jitsu Federation (BJJF) Jiu-Jitsu Championship held in Las Vegas, Nevada.

In 2022, Phillipe was a guest on Deddy Corbuzier's podcast and YouTube channel, where she demonstrated various self-defense tactics she learned from jiujitsu.

In 2023, Phillipe placed second at the Abu Dhabi Combat Club (ADCC) Southeast Asia 2023 competition in the beginner female 55kg division.

On 25 February 2024, Phillipe was promoted by Italo Lins to purple belt status. On 14 September 2024, Phillipe competed in the AJP Tour Jakarta International Jiu-Jitsu Championship 2024 GI & NO-GI and placed first in the Women's GI / Purple / Professional / 55 kg division. In November of that year, she competed at the Copa da Malasia XX and placed second.

On 17 May 2025, Phillipe competed at the Combat Sport Championship 2025 – BJJ GI & NOGI and placed second in the Female Gi / Purple / Master 1 (30+) / -58,5 kg (Feather) division.

In 2025, Phillipe participated as a member of Team Indonesia in Netflix's show Physical: Asia, which premiered on 28 October 2025. Phillipe's team members were bodybuilder Igedz Executioner, Swimmer Glenn Victor, fitness instructor Jeremiah Lakhwani, basketball player Maria Selena, badminton player Marcus Gideon and his replacement, bodybuilder Isai Kesek. She has stated she had recommended Deddy Corbuzier as a potential contestant for the show.

Phillipe is affiliated with the academy Kemang Jiu Jitsu (Grapping Fighting Team Indonesia).

== Filmography ==
=== Web shows ===
Year	Title	Role	Notes	Ref.
2025	Physical: Asia	Contestant	Netflix	
