= Orkhonbayar Bayarsaikhan =

Mongolian wrestler

Orkhonbayar Bayarsaikhan ᠪᠠᠶᠠᠷᠰᠠᠢᠬᠠᠨ ᠤ᠋ ᠣᠷᠬᠤᠨᠪᠠᠶᠠᠷ
Personal information
- Native name: Баярсайханы Орхонбаяр
- Nationality: Mongolia
- Born: 1 July 1998 (age 28) Tsagaannuur, Selenge Province, Mongolia
- Education: Teacher Education and Coaching
- Employer: Mongolian Armed Forces: Senior Lieutenant
- Height: 1.82 m (6 ft 0 in)
- Spouse: Munkhtsetseg Shagdarsuren

Sport
- Country: Mongolia
- Sport: Mongolian wrestling
- Rank: State Wide Champion
- University team: Avarga University (2016–2020)
- Club: Tavan Khan; Aldar Sports Committee
- Coached by: Gantumur Luvsan (2012–2014); Usukh-Ireedui Tuvdendorj (2015–present); Adyaakhuu Bayarsaikhan (2015–present)

Achievements and titles
- National finals: (gold) (2026)
Medal record
Mongolian wrestling
Representing Mongolia
National Festival
| Gold medal – first place | 2026 Ulaanbaatar |
| Silver medal – second place | 2024 Ulaanbaatar |
| Silver medal – second place | 2022 Ulaanbaatar |
Tsagaan Sar
| Bronze medal – third place | 2025 Ulaanbaatar |
President’s Cup
| Gold medal – first place | 2025 Ulaanbaatar |
| Gold medal – first place | 2022 Ulaanbaatar |
Provincial Festival
| Gold medal – first place | 2019 Selenge |
| Gold medal – first place | 2018 Selenge |
Sum Festival
| Gold medal – first place | 2024 Tsagaannuur |
| Gold medal – first place | 2017 Tsagaannuur |

Orkhonbayar Bayarsaikhan (Mongolian: Баярсайханы Орхонбаяр, born 30 June 1998) is a Mongolian wrestler who competes in traditional Mongolian wrestling (Bökh). He holds the title of State Wide Champion and became the 26th State Wide Champion in the history of the National Naadam Festival.

== Work and Business ==
- Since 2019, he has been affiliated with and serving under the “Aldar” Sports Committee of the Mongolian Armed Forces, holding the military rank of Senior Lieutenant.
- Since 2022, he has been a shareholder of “Mongolian Standard Development Group” LLCshareholder and ultimate beneficial owner.
- Since 2026, he has been a shareholder of “Standard Network” LLC shareholder and ultimate beneficial owner.

== Education ==
In 2020, he graduated from Avarga University with a Bachelor’s degree in Education, specializing in Teacher Education and Coaching.

== Career ==
A fan of wrestling and judo as a kid, Bayarsaikhan started wrestling in 2014 at the age at the age of 16 where he started training in Bökh and freestyle wrestling. In 2017 he won an youth freestyle wrestling championship, but had to take a year off due to a leg injury. In 2018 he won a provincial Bökh tournament, and competed in his first Naadam competition and reached 5th round, earning the title rank of Mongolian Bökh Nachin (falcon). In 2022, he won the Naadam competition, as well as several other national Bökh competitions. In 2023, sustained a shoulder injury that required several surgeries, before coming back to competitive Bökh wrestling in 2025. In March 2025, he won the Nauryz, a 128-man wrestling tournament. In 2025, he appeared as the captain of Team Mongolia on the Netflix competition series Physical: Asia, which premiered on 28 October 2025.

== Mongolian Wrestling Record ==
Orkhonbayar Bayarsaikhan
| Year | Level | Participants | Rank | Wins | Earned title | Notes |
|---|---|---|---|---|---|---|
| 2026 | State | 1024 | State Lion | 10 | State Wide Champion | Promoted directly to Dayan Avaraga under new law after winning all 10 rounds in the expanded 1024-wrestler tournament. |
| 2025 | State | 512 | State Lion | 5 | Ulam Nemekh | |
| 2024 | State | 512 | State Lion | 8 | Ulemj Badrakh | |
| 2023 | State | 512 | State Lion | 5 | Usukh Ider | |
| 2022 | State | 1024 | State Hawk | 9 | State Lion | |
| 2021 | | | State Falcon | | State Hawk | Retroactive promotion. |
| 2021 | Cancelled | | State Falcon | | | The tournament cancelled due to covid. |
| 2020 | State | 512 | State Falcon | 5 | Usukh Ider | |
| 2019 | State | 512 | Lion of Aimag | 5 | State Falcon | |
State Naadam Winner Won at least 5 rounds in State Naadam Aimag/Sum Naadam Promotion

== Filmography ==
=== Web shows ===
| Year | Title | Role | Notes | Ref. |
|---|---|---|---|---|
| 2025 | Physical: Asia | Contestant | Netflix | |
| 2025 | Physical: Welcome to Mongolia | Cast Member | Netflix | |
