= Dong Hyun Kim =

South Korean mixed martial artist (born 1981)

Kim Dong-hyun
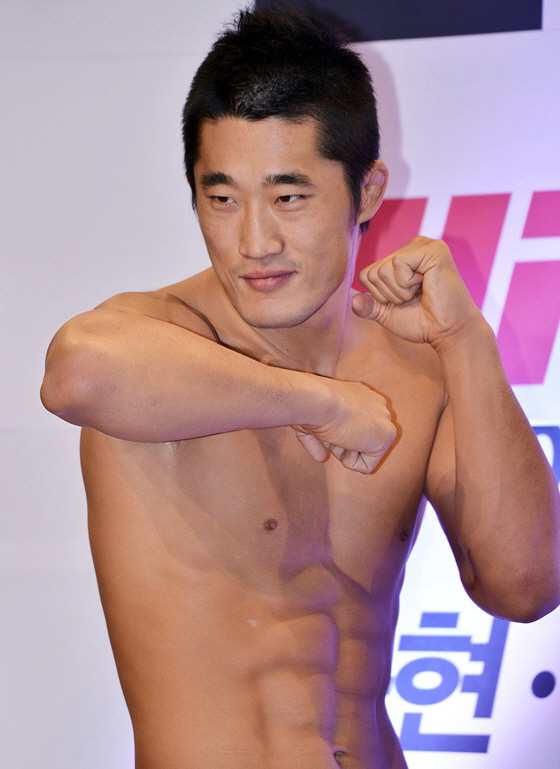
- Kim in 2012
- Born: Kim Bong; November 17, 1981 (age 44); Suwon, South Korea
- Other names: Stun Gun
- Height: 6 ft 1 in (185 cm)
- Weight: 170 lb (77 kg; 12 st 2 lb)
- Division: Welterweight (2007–2017); Lightweight (2004–2007)
- Reach: 76 in (193 cm)
- Stance: Southpaw
- Fighting out of: Busan, South Korea
- Team: Busan Team MAD
- Rank: 4th dan black belt in Judo; 3rd dan black belt in Taekwondo; 1st dan black belt in Hapkido; Brown belt in Brazilian jiu-jitsu
- Years active: 2004–2017

Mixed martial arts record
- Total: 28
- Wins: 22
- By knockout: 9
- By submission: 2
- By decision: 11
- Losses: 4
- By knockout: 3
- By decision: 1
- Draws: 1
- No contests: 1

Other information
- Spouse: Song Ha-yul (m. 2018)
- Children: 3
- Mixed martial arts record from Sherdog

Korean name
- Hangul: 김동현
- Hanja: 金東炫
- RR: Gim Donghyeon
- MR: Kim Tonghyŏn

Dong Hyun Kim

YouTube information
- Channel: 매미킴
- Years active: 2019
- Subscribers: 1,080,000
- Views: 657 million
- Last updated: 28 November 2025

Kim Dong-hyun (Korean: 김동현; born November 17, 1981), anglicized as Dong Hyun Kim, is a South Korean retired mixed martial artist who most notably fought in the UFC's welterweight division. He was signed by the UFC after fighting in the Japanese promotion DEEP and in the South Korean promotion Spirit MC.

Kim is also prominent as a regular cast member in variety shows Master in the House, DoReMi Market, The Return of Superman, and Strong Heart.

== Early life ==
Kim was born in Suwon, South Korea. He is of the Gimhae Kim clan. He moved to Daejeon when he was a primary school student, where he took up Inline speed skating. He began training in Judo when he was 14 years old, and trained in Taekwondo and Hapkido together in his late teens for his interest in martial arts. And later Kim began to practice Judo professionally at Yong-In University, which led him to reignite his MMA career. Kim began training at Wajyutsu Keisyukai, a renowned Japanese gym frequented by a number of top Japanese fighters. As one of the largest members of the gym, Kim became a regular sparring partner of middleweight Yushin Okami. At this time he competed in Sambo. He completed his mandatory military service in the Republic of Korea Marine Corps in 2001. Later he became a fighter for Spirit MC, but retired in 2004 for economic reasons. He mentioned during Law of the Jungle that he spent four months in Auckland, New Zealand working in 3 concurrent part-time roles (kitchenhand and sashimi chef/poissonnier, bricklayer and construction labourer). His job situation didn’t improve upon returning to Korea until his parents finally allowed him to train again. He has trained with Busan Team MAD since 2007. He teaches self defence classes. One of his students is Hani of Korean girl group EXID.

== Career ==
=== Filmography ===
He is a regular guest on Korean variety and talk shows. He has appeared on more than seventy TV shows since 2010. On June 16, 2013, he featured as the 'Hulk' on Running Man episode 150 (SBS Sunday night show). On that episode he led the character that transformed into Hulk mode in Running Man Avengers. On March 22, 2015, Kim reappeared on Running Man in episode 239 as a guest. Kim was also featured along with fellow UFC fighter Yoshihiro Akiyama in the Korean boy band MYNAME's dramatic music video for their single "Baby I'm Sorry". On June 26, 2016, Kim returned as a guest on Running Man in episode 305. Kim is regular cast member of Great Escape Season 1 of 2018 and Season 2 of 2019. In 2019, he guest-starred on Not the Person You Used To Know, where he appeared as one of the friends of Hani of EXID.

In September 2018, he announced his marriage to Song Ha-ryul on several variety shows, and then revealed her pregnancy on the February 14, 2019, episode of Amazing Saturday.

=== Early career ===
Kim gained recognition after signing with the Japanese DEEP organization, earning a succession of wins before knocking out DEEP welterweight champion Hidehiko Hasegawa in a non-title bout in 2007. Kim and Hasegawa later fought to a controversial draw in a title fight at DEEP 32nd Impact, leaving defending champion Hasegawa with the title. Kim departed from DEEP to sign a contract with PRIDE Fighting Championships, but the UFC purchased and dismantled PRIDE before Kim could fight in the organization. Kim's performances attracted the attention of World Extreme Cagefighting (WEC) talent scouts, who offered him a contract. However, because the WEC is not televised in Korea, Kim's management pushed for and received a contract with the Ultimate Fighting Championship (UFC), which airs on Korean cable television.

Kim's original nickname is "Stun Gun", then a lot of Korean fans started calling him "Maemi", which means Cicada in Korean. The nickname was given to Kim from his fighting style where he likes to take his opponents to the ground, grapple with them and never let them escape like a Cicada on a tree.

=== Ultimate Fighting Championship ===
Kim made his UFC debut at UFC 84 against Jason Tan, methodically breaking down his opponent and ultimately winning by technical knockout in the third round. With his performance and victory, Kim became the actual first fighter from South Korea to fight in the UFC, although both UFC and the media at times mistakenly label the former American fighter, Joe Son, as the first Korean UFC fighter, most likely because of Son's ethnicity. Kim's appearance drew considerable attention in South Korea, since his UFC debut was in 2008, which was five years after when MMA was introduced and popularized in South Korea by Spirit MC, the country's pioneering MMA organization. One week before the event, a prime time, hour-long special about Kim was aired on Korean television. Though Kim's bout did not air on the UFC pay-per-view, it aired live on Korean television, and was then replayed twice more before the regular event coverage resumed.

He made his second octagon appearance at UFC 88, capturing a split decision over The Ultimate Fighter 7 alumnus Matt Brown. During this fight, Kim's conditioning was very poor due to jet lag, and visa problems prevented him from bringing a coach. In the first round, Kim threatened Brown with a standing rear-naked choke and took Brown's back on numerous occasions but became exhausted in the second. In the third, Kim used some effective ground-and-pound and cut Brown with an elbow. All three judges scored the bout 29–28, two in Kim's favor and one in Brown's favor. The decision was contested by the crowd in attendance with noticeable booing.

Kim returned to the octagon in Las Vegas, Nevada, on January 31, 2009, as he faced off against fellow judo practitioner Karo Parisyan at UFC 94. With Frank Mir in his corner who served as his boxing coach prior to the fight. Kim lost to Parisyan on split decision although fans in attendance booed the decision, and former UFC champions Matt Hughes, Randy Couture and UFC president Dana White commented that they thought Kim won the fight. Afterwards, however, Parisyan tested positive for three banned pain killers: Hydrocodone, Hydromorphone and Oxymorphone, leading the Nevada Athletic Commission to declare the match a No Contest, and a nine month suspensuon for Parisyan. Later, on March 5, 2009, Kim signed a four fight extension with the UFC.

Kim defeated T. J. Grant at UFC 100, winning by a unanimous decision, threatening with a guillotine choke midway through the second round. He was scheduled to fight Dan Hardy on November 14, 2009, at UFC 105, but was forced to withdraw due to ligament injuries in his right knee incurred while sparring with Kazuhiro Nakamura and was subsequently replaced on the card by Mike Swick.

Kim was expected to face Chris Lytle on February 21, 2010, at UFC 110. However, Kim was forced off the card after suffering another knee injury. Brian Foster stepped in as his replacement.

Kim next faced The Ultimate Fighter season 7 winner, Amir Sadollah on May 29, 2010, at UFC 114 and won via unanimous decision, dominating Sadollah with far superior judo.

Kim was then expected to face fellow undefeated fighter John Hathaway at UFC 120, but was later replaced by Mike Pyle due to an elbow ligament injury incurred during his training.

Kim defeated The Ultimate Fighter season 5 winner, Nate Diaz on January 1, 2011, at UFC 125 via unanimous decision. Kim used his judo to control rounds 1 and 2. Diaz mounted a remarkable attack in Round 3, but it was not enough and Kim won a decision over Diaz. After the fight Kim called out then-current UFC welterweight champion, Georges St-Pierre, whom he considered a hero and role model as a mixed martial artist. Later on January 10, 2011, Kim signed a four fight extension with the UFC.

Kim lost to Carlos Condit on July 2, 2011, at UFC 132 via first-round KO due to a flying knee. This loss was the first of his professional MMA career.

Kim fought Sean Pierson on December 30, 2011, at UFC 141. Kim used superior striking to control Pierson throughout the fight and win a unanimous decision, even landing a leaping front-kick to the face in the second round that wobbled Pierson.

Kim lost to Demian Maia at UFC 148 on July 7, 2012 by TKO. The bout was stopped in forty-seven seconds in the first round by referee Mario Yamasaki, after Maia took Kim down and ended up in the mounted position. Many observers, including UFC commentator Joe Rogan, thought that Kim had broken a rib during the bout, but it was later revealed that he suffered a major muscle spasm while defending Maia's takedown attempts.

Kim faced Paulo Thiago on November 10, 2012, at UFC on Fuel TV 6. He dominated Thiago on the ground for all three rounds, ending the bout with a wild display of ground and pound reminiscent of Kazushi Sakuraba. He won via unanimous decision (30–26, 30–27, and 30–27).

Kim fought Siyar Bahadurzada on March 3, 2013, at UFC on Fuel TV 8. He earned a unanimous victory.

Kim then faced Erick Silva on October 9, 2013, at UFC Fight Night 29. He won via knockout at 3:01 of the second round, earning him his first Knockout of the Night bonus award. Later on October 30, 2013, Kim signed a four fight extension with the UFC.

Kim faced John Hathaway on March 1, 2014, at The Ultimate Fighter: China Finale. Kim defeated Hathaway via third-round knockout, earning him his first Performance of the Night honors.

Kim was expected to face Hector Lombard on August 23, 2014, at UFC Fight Night 48. However, Lombard pulled out of the bout and was replaced by Tyron Woodley. Kim lost the fight via TKO in the first round.

Kim faced Josh Burkman on May 23, 2015, at UFC 187. Kim won the fight via submission in the third round.

Kim was expected to face Jorge Masvidal on November 28, 2015, at UFC Fight Night 79. However, on November 14, it was announced that Masvidal would instead face Benson Henderson at the event after his scheduled opponent Thiago Alves pulled out of their fight. Kim instead faced Dominic Waters. Kim won the fight via technical knockout in the first round.

Kim was expected to face Neil Magny on August 20, 2016, at UFC 202. However, Kim was removed from the fight on July 12 and replaced by Lorenz Larkin.

Kim was expected to face Gunnar Nelson on November 19, 2016, at UFC Fight Night 99. However, on October 21, it was announced that Nelson had pulled out due to an injury and the fight was off. In turn, Kim was removed from the card and was expected to be rescheduled for a future event.

Kim next faced Tarec Saffiedine on December 30, 2016, at UFC 207. He was awarded a victory by split decision.

Kim faced Colby Covington on June 17, 2017, at UFC Fight Night 111. He lost the fight by unanimous decision.

After that, Kim retired from MMA.

== Championships and accomplishments ==
=== Mixed martial arts ===
- Ultimate Fighting Championship
  - First spinning elbow knockout in UFC history vs. John Hathaway
  - Performance of the Night (One time) vs. John Hathaway
  - Knockout of the Night (One time) vs. Erick Silva
  - UFC.com Awards
    - 2014: Knockout of the Year vs. John Hathaway
- World MMA Awards
  - Knockout of the Year (2014) nomination vs. John Hathaway
- Bleacher Report
  - Knockout of the Year (2014) vs. John Hathaway
  - 5 Best Foreign UFC Fighters #4 the other 4 fighters: Alexander Gustafsson
    Khabib Nurmagomedov, Conor McGregor, Rory MacDonald
- Fox Sports
  - Knockout of the Year (2014) vs. John Hathaway
- MMA Junkie
  - Knockout of the Year (2014) vs. John Hathaway
  - Knockout of the Month (2014 March) vs. John Hathaway
  - Knockout of the Year #3 (2013) vs. Erick Silva
- Sherdog
  - Knockout of the Year (2014) vs. John Hathaway
- MMA Mania
  - Knockout of the Year (2014) vs. John Hathaway
- LowKick MMA
  - Knockout of the Year (2014) vs. John Hathaway
- MMA Fighting
  - Knockout of the Year #2 (2014) vs. John Hathaway
- Bloody Elbow
  - Knockout of the Year #2 (2014) vs. John Hathaway
- Sports Net
  - Knockout of the Year #3 (2014) vs. John Hathaway
  - Knockout of the Year #7 (2013) vs. Erick Silva

=== Grappling ===
- 2013 ADCC Korea 88 kg: 1st place

=== Entertainment ===
- 2018 6th Korean Art And Cultural Awards - Sportainer
- 2019 Korea First Brand Awards - Sportainer
- 2020 Brand Of The Year Awards - Sportainer
- 2020 2020 SBS Entertainment Awards - Excellence Award in Show/Variety Category

== Filmography ==
=== Television shows ===
Year	Title	Role	Notes	Ref.
2015	Law of the Jungle	Cast Member	in Nicaragua (Episode 178–185)	
2018–present	Great Escape	Cast Member	Season 1–4	
2018–present	DoReMi Market	Cast Member		
2019–2020	Player 7	Cast Member	Season 1–2	
2019–2021	The Gentlemen's League	Cast Member	a.k.a Let's Play Soccer (뭉쳐야 찬다)	
2019–present	Same Age Trainer	Main Host		
2020–2023	Master in the House	Cast Member		
2021	Let's Play Basketball	Cast Member	Let's Play Soccer spin-off	
2021	Steel Troops	Fixed moderator		
2021	Lanson Marketplace	Host		
2021	Becoming Smarter	Host		
2021	The Strong Man 2	Team leader		
2021	Hogu's Secret Tutoring	Host		
2021	Superhero	Host		
2021–2023	The Gentlemen's League 2	Cast Member	a.k.a. Let's Play Soccer 2 (뭉쳐야 찬다 2)	
2022	National University is National University	Host		
2022	Steel Troops	Panelist	Season 2	
2022	Naked Korean History	Cast Member		
2022–present	The Return of Superman	Cast Member		
2022	Steel Ball	Host	Steel Troops spin-off	
2022	Sports Golden Bell	Contestant	Chuseok Special	
2022	The King of Ssireum	Contestant	Spinoff	
2022–2023	Fighter	Mentor		
2023	My Friends Are Smarter Than Me	Host		
2023	World's First Merchant	Contestant	Season 2	
2023	Carefree Travellers Returns	Cast Member	Episode 9–16	
2023–2024	The Gentlemen's League 3	Cast Member	a.k.a Let's Play Soccer 3 (뭉쳐야 찬다 3)	
2024	When I Opened My Eyes	Cast Member		
2024	Iron Girls	Cast Member		
2024	The Iron Squad W	Host		
2024	King of Survival: Tribal War	Cast Member		
2024	The Pork Fighter	Cast Member		
2024	Hidden Eye	Cast Member		
2024–present	Handsome Guys	Cast Member		
2025	Iron Girls 2	Cast Member		

=== Web shows ===
Year	Title	Role	Notes	Ref.
2024	Physical 100: Season 2 - Underground	Contestant	Season 2	
2024	The Zone: Survival Mission 3	Cast Member	Season 3	
2025	Physical: Asia	Contestant		
2025	Physical: Welcome to Mongolia	Cast Member		

== Mixed martial arts record ==
Professional record breakdown
28 matches	22 wins	4 losses
By knockout	9	3
By submission	2	0
By decision	11	1
Draws	1	
No contests	1	

Res.	Record	Opponent	Method	Event	Date	Round	Time	Location	Notes
Loss	22–4–1 (1)	Colby Covington	Decision (unanimous)	UFC Fight Night: Holm vs. Correia	June 17, 2017	3	5:00	Kallang, Singapore	
Win	22–3–1 (1)	Tarec Saffiedine	Decision (split)	UFC 207	December 30, 2016	3	5:00	Las Vegas, Nevada, United States	
Win	21–3–1 (1)	Dominic Waters	TKO (punches)	UFC Fight Night: Henderson vs. Masvidal	November 28, 2015	1	3:11	Seoul, South Korea	
Win	20–3–1 (1)	Joshua Burkman	Submission (arm-triangle choke)	UFC 187	May 23, 2015	3	2:13	Las Vegas, Nevada, United States	
Loss	19–3–1 (1)	Tyron Woodley	TKO (punches)	UFC Fight Night: Bisping vs. Le	August 23, 2014	1	1:01	Macau, SAR, China	
Win	19–2–1 (1)	John Hathaway	KO (spinning elbow)	The Ultimate Fighter China Finale: Kim vs. Hathaway	March 1, 2014	3	1:02	Macau, SAR, China	Performance of the Night. Knockout of the Year.
Win	18–2–1 (1)	Erick Silva	KO (punch)	UFC Fight Night: Maia vs. Shields	October 9, 2013	2	3:01	Barueri, Brazil	Knockout of the Night.
Win	17–2–1 (1)	Siyar Bahadurzada	Decision (unanimous)	UFC on Fuel TV: Silva vs. Stann	March 3, 2013	3	5:00	Saitama, Japan	
Win	16–2–1 (1)	Paulo Thiago	Decision (unanimous)	UFC on Fuel TV: Franklin vs. Le	November 10, 2012	3	5:00	Macau, SAR, China	
Loss	15–2–1 (1)	Demian Maia	TKO (rib injury)	UFC 148	July 7, 2012	1	0:47	Las Vegas, Nevada, United States	
Win	15–1–1 (1)	Sean Pierson	Decision (unanimous)	UFC 141	December 30, 2011	3	5:00	Las Vegas, Nevada, United States	
Loss	14–1–1 (1)	Carlos Condit	KO (flying knee and punches)	UFC 132	July 2, 2011	1	2:58	Las Vegas, Nevada, United States	
Win	14–0–1 (1)	Nate Diaz	Decision (unanimous)	UFC 125	January 1, 2011	3	5:00	Las Vegas, Nevada, United States	
Win	13–0–1 (1)	Amir Sadollah	Decision (unanimous)	UFC 114	May 29, 2010	3	5:00	Las Vegas, Nevada, United States	
Win	12–0–1 (1)	T. J. Grant	Decision (unanimous)	UFC 100	July 11, 2009	3	5:00	Las Vegas, Nevada, United States	
NC	11–0–1 (1)	Karo Parisyan	NC (overturned)	UFC 94	January 31, 2009	3	5:00	Las Vegas, Nevada, United States	Originally a split decision win for Parisyan; overturned after he tested positive for banned painkillers.
Win	11–0–1	Matt Brown	Decision (split)	UFC 88	September 6, 2008	3	5:00	Atlanta, Georgia, United States	
Win	10–0–1	Jason Tan	TKO (elbows)	UFC 84	May 24, 2008	3	0:25	Las Vegas, Nevada, United States	
Draw	9–0–1	Hidehiko Hasegawa	Draw	Deep: 32 Impact	October 9, 2007	3	5:00	Tokyo, Japan	For the Deep Welterweight Championship.
Win	9–0	Hidehiko Hasegawa	KO (slam and punches)	Deep: 31 Impact	August 5, 2007	3	4:57	Tokyo, Japan	Welterweight debut.
Win	8–0	Yukiharu Maejima	KO (punches)	Deep: CMA Festival 2	July 23, 2007	1	0:11	Tokyo, Japan	
Win	7–0	Hidenobu Koike	KO (punch)	Deep: 28 Impact	February 16, 2007	2	4:33	Tokyo, Japan	
Win	6–0	Jun Ando	TKO (punches)	Deep: 27 Impact	December 20, 2006	2	0:44	Tokyo, Japan	
Win	5–0	Kousei Kubota	KO (knee)	Deep: 26 Impact	October 10, 2006	1	2:46	Tokyo, Japan	
Win	4–0	Tomoyoshi Iwamiya	Decision (unanimous)	Deep: 25 Impact	August 4, 2006	2	5:00	Tokyo, Japan	
Win	3–0	Mitsunori Tanimura	Submission (rear-naked choke)	Deep: CMA Festival	May 24, 2006	1	4:28	Tokyo, Japan	
Win	2–0	Hyung-Kwang Kim	Decision (unanimous)	Spirit MC 5: 2004 GP Unlimited	September 11, 2004	3	5:00	Seoul, South Korea	
Win	1–0	Young-Ahm Noh	Decision (unanimous)	Spirit MC 3: I Will Be Back!!!	April 10, 2004	3	5:00	Seoul, South Korea	

== See also ==
- List of male mixed martial artists
