= Short-track speed skating at the 2018 Winter Olympics – Men's 500 metres =

Men's 500 metres at the XXIII Olympic Winter Games
- Venue: Gangneung Ice Arena; Gangneung, South Korea
- Dates: 20 February 2018 (heats); 22 February 2018 (quarterfinals, semifinals, finals)
- Competitors: 33 from 16 nations
- Winning time: 39.584

Medalists
1st place, gold medalist(s)		Wu Dajing	China
2nd place, silver medalist(s)		Hwang Dae-heon	South Korea
3rd place, bronze medalist(s)		Lim Hyo-jun	South Korea

The men's 500 metres in short track speed skating at the 2018 Winter Olympics took place on 20 and 22 February 2018 at the Gangneung Ice Arena in Gangneung, South Korea. Wu Dajing of China set an Olympic record (heat) and 2 world records (quarterfinal and final) while leading wire-to-wire in all 3 contests en route to capturing the gold.

== Records ==
Prior to this competition, the existing world and Olympic records were as follows.

World record	J. R. Celski (USA)	39.937	Calgary, Canada	21 October 2012
Olympic record	Charles Hamelin (CAN)	40.770	Vancouver, Canada	26 February 2010

Three Olympic records and two world records were set during the competition.

Date	Round	Athlete	Country	Time	Record	Ref
20 February	Heat 1	Wu Dajing	China	40.264	OR	
22 February	Quarterfinal 2	Wu Dajing	China	39.800	WR, OR	
22 February	Final A	Wu Dajing	China	39.584	WR, OR	

== Results ==
=== Heats ===
Q – qualified for the quarterfinals
ADV – advanced
PEN – penalty

Rank	Heat	Name	Country	Time	Notes
1	1	Wu Dajing	China	40.264	Q, OR
2	1	Bartosz Konopko	Poland	41.039	Q
3	1	Andy Jung	Australia	1:03.137	
4	1	Thibaut Fauconnet	France	1:04.756	
	1	Aaron Tran	United States		PEN
1	2	Samuel Girard	Canada	40.493	Q
2	2	Roberts Zvejnieks	Latvia	40.563	Q
3	2	Yuri Confortola	Italy	40.869	
4	2	Vladislav Bykanov	Israel	47.177	
1	3	Seo Yi-ra	South Korea	40.438	Q
2	3	Dylan Hoogerwerf	Netherlands	40.657	Q
3	3	Sébastien Lepape	France	40.900	
4	3	Viktor Knoch	Hungary	1:06.040	
1	4	Lim Hyo-jun	South Korea	40.418	Q
2	4	Daan Breeuwsma	Netherlands	40.806	Q
3	4	Denis Nikisha	Kazakhstan	41.436	ADV
	4	Charles Hamelin	Canada		PEN
1	5	Ren Ziwei	China	40.294	Q
2	5	Aleksandr Shulginov	Olympic Athletes from Russia	40.585	Q
3	5	Nurbergen Zhumagaziyev	Kazakhstan	40.748	ADV
	5	Sjinkie Knegt	Netherlands		PEN
1	6	Shaoang Liu	Hungary	40.526	Q
2	6	Ryosuke Sakazume	Japan	40.658	Q
3	6	Abzal Azhgaliyev	Kazakhstan	43.388	ADV
	6	Pavel Sitnikov	Olympic Athletes from Russia		PEN
1	7	Hwang Dae-heon	South Korea	40.758	Q
2	7	Keita Watanabe	Japan	41.678	Q
3	7	Thomas Hong	United States	43.096	
	7	Jong Kwang-bom	North Korea		PEN
1	8	Shaolin Sándor Liu	Hungary	40.650	Q
2	8	Han Tianyu	China	40.744	Q
3	8	Semion Elistratov	Olympic Athletes from Russia	40.829	
4	8	John-Henry Krueger	United States	41.008	

=== Quarterfinals ===
Q – qualified for the semifinals
ADV – advanced
PEN – penalty

Rank	Heat	Name	Country	Time	Notes
1	1	Ren Ziwei	China	40.032	Q
2	1	Shaolin Sándor Liu	Hungary	40.471	Q
3	1	Denis Nikisha	Kazakhstan	40.806	
4	1	Aleksandr Shulginov	Olympic Athletes from Russia	54.498	
5	1	Bartosz Konopko	Poland	1:10.996	
1	2	Wu Dajing	China	39.800	Q, WR, OR
2	2	Hwang Dae-heon	South Korea	40.861	Q
3	2	Roberts Zvejnieks	Latvia	40.904	
4	2	Keita Watanabe	Japan	41.354	
5	2	Nurbergen Zhumagaziyev	Kazakhstan	DNF	
1	3	Samuel Girard	Canada	40.477	Q
2	3	Ryosuke Sakazume	Japan	40.563	Q
3	3	Han Tianyu	China	1:14.891	
4	3	Seo Yi-ra	South Korea	1:17.779	
1	4	Lim Hyo-jun	South Korea	40.400	Q
2	4	Daan Breeuwsma	Netherlands	40.677	Q
3	4	Dylan Hoogerwerf	Netherlands	41.007	
4	4	Abzal Azhgaliyev	Kazakhstan	41.616	ADV
	4	Shaoang Liu	Hungary		PEN

=== Semifinals ===
QA – qualified for Final A
QB – qualified for Final B

Rank	Heat	Name	Country	Time	Notes
1	1	Wu Dajing	China	40.087	QA
2	1	Samuel Girard	Canada	40.185	QA
3	1	Shaolin Sándor Liu	Hungary	40.399	QB
4	1	Daan Breeuwsma	Netherlands	40.775	QB
5	1	Abzal Azhgaliyev	Kazakhstan	40.835	
1	2	Hwang Dae-heon	South Korea	40.108	QA
2	2	Lim Hyo-jun	South Korea	40.132	QA
3	2	Ren Ziwei	China	40.418	QB
4	2	Ryosuke Sakazume	Japan	40.434	QB

=== Final B ===
Rank	Name	Country	Time	Notes
5	Shaolin Sándor Liu	Hungary	40.651	
6	Ren Ziwei	China	40.694	
7	Daan Breeuwsma	Netherlands	40.835	
8	Ryosuke Sakazume	Japan	40.985	

=== Final A ===
The final was held on 22 February 2018 at 20:15.

Rank	Name	Country	Time	Notes
1st place, gold medalist(s)	Wu Dajing	China	39.584	WR, OR
2nd place, silver medalist(s)	Hwang Dae-heon	South Korea	39.854	
3rd place, bronze medalist(s)	Lim Hyo-jun	South Korea	39.919	
4	Samuel Girard	Canada	39.987	
