= Short-track speed skating at the 2018 Winter Olympics – Men's 1500 metres =

Men's 1500 metres at the XXIII Olympic Winter Games
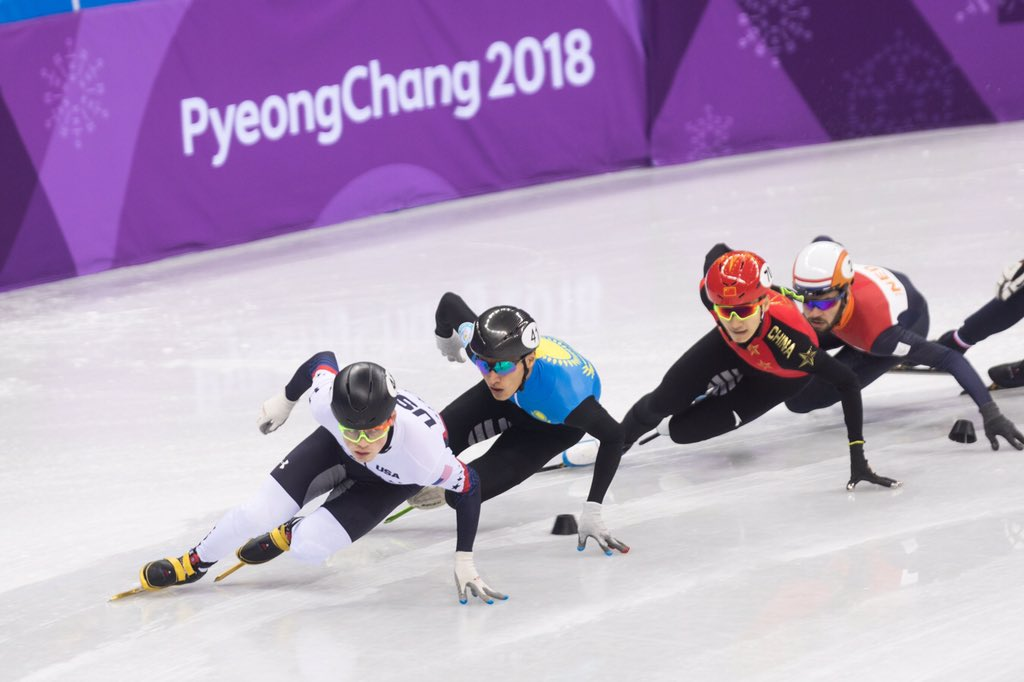
- Venue: Gangneung Ice Arena
- Dates: 10 February 2018
- Competitors: 37 from 18 nations
- Winning time: 2:10.485

Medalists
1st place, gold medalist(s)		Lim Hyo-jun	South Korea
2nd place, silver medalist(s)		Sjinkie Knegt	Netherlands
3rd place, bronze medalist(s)		Semion Elistratov	Olympic Athletes from Russia

The men's 1500 metres in short track speed skating at the 2018 Winter Olympics took place at the Gangneung Ice Arena in Gangneung, South Korea.

In the victory ceremony, the medals were presented by Irena Szewińska, member of the International Olympic Committee, accompanied by Myong-Hi Chang, ISU honorary member.

== History ==
South Korea has historically performed well in short-track speed skating, with 42 of their 53 medals coming from the event.

== Event ==
There were 12,000 spectators for the event.

== Records ==
Prior to this competition, the existing world and Olympic records were as follows.

World record	Sjinkie Knegt (NED)	2:07.943	Salt Lake City, United States	13 November 2016
Olympic record	Lee Jung-su (KOR)	2:10.949	Vancouver, Canada	13 February 2010

One Olympic record was set during the competition.

Date	Round	Athlete	Country	Time	Record	Ref
10 February 2018	Final A	Lim Hyo-jun	South Korea	2:10.485	OR	

== Results ==
=== Heats ===
Q – qualified for the semifinals
ADV – advanced
PEN – penalty

Rank	Heat	Name	Country	Time	Notes
1	1	Sándor Liu Shaolin	Hungary	2:12.835	Q
2	1	Samuel Girard	Canada	2:12.923	Q
3	1	Semion Elistratov	Olympic Athletes from Russia	2:13.087	Q
4	1	Hiroki Yokoyama	Japan	2:13.323	
5	1	Ward Pétré	Belgium	2:17.362	
	1	Farrell Treacy	Great Britain	DNF	
1	2	Charles Hamelin	Canada	2:12.130	Q
2	2	Jens Almey	Belgium	2:12.998	Q
3	2	Aaron Tran	United States	2:14.133	Q
4	2	Andy Jung	Australia	2:16.995	ADV
5	2	Han Tianyu	China	2:38.865	ADV
	2	Yuri Confortola	Italy		PEN
1	3	Hwang Dae-heon	South Korea	2:15.561	Q
2	3	Itzhak de Laat	Netherlands	2:15.691	Q
3	3	Wu Dajing	China	2:15.823	Q
4	3	Tommaso Dotti	Italy	2:16.177	
5	3	Pascal Dion	Canada	2:16.856	ADV
6	3	Choe Un-song	North Korea	2:18.213	
	3	Vladislav Bykanov	Israel		PEN
1	4	Lim Hyo-jun	South Korea	2:13.891	Q
2	4	Sébastien Lepape	France	2:13.965	Q
3	4	Shaoang Liu	Hungary	2:14.160	Q
4	4	Denis Nikisha	Kazakhstan	2:14.847	
5	4	Maksim Siarheyeu	Belarus	2:15.242	
	4	Kazuki Yoshinaga	Japan		PEN
1	5	Seo Yi-ra	South Korea	2:18.750	Q
2	5	Roberto Puķītis	Latvia	2:18.825	Q
3	5	J. R. Celski	United States	2:19.028	Q
4	5	Keita Watanabe	Japan	2:19.205	
5	5	Csaba Burján	Hungary	2:19.284	
6	5	Aleksandr Shulginov	Olympic Athletes from Russia	2:19.308	
1	6	John-Henry Krueger	United States	2:15.671	Q
2	6	Thibaut Fauconnet	France	2:15.768	Q
3	6	Sjinkie Knegt	Netherlands	2:15.949	Q
4	6	Pavel Sitnikov	Olympic Athletes from Russia	2:33.653	
5	6	Xu Hongzhi	China	2:35.641	ADV
6	6	Nurbergen Zhumagaziyev	Kazakhstan	DNF	

=== Semifinals ===
QA – qualified for Final A
QB – qualified for Final B
ADV – advanced
PEN – penalty

Rank	Heat	Name	Country	Time	Notes
1	1	Semion Elistratov	Olympic Athletes from Russia	2:11.003	QA
2	1	Charles Hamelin	Canada	2:11.124	QA
3	1	Seo Yi-ra	South Korea	2:11.126	QB
4	1	Roberto Puķītis	Latvia	2:11.165	QB
5	1	Andy Jung	Australia	2:11.183	
6	1	Samuel Girard	Canada	DNF	ADV
	1	J. R. Celski	United States		PEN
1	2	Sjinkie Knegt	Netherlands	2:11.900	QA
2	2	Thibaut Fauconnet	France	2:12.049	QA
3	2	Pascal Dion	Canada	2:12.640	QB
4	2	Aaron Tran	United States	2:13.487	QB
5	2	Sándor Liu Shaolin	Hungary	2:45.709	ADV
6	2	Jens Almey	Belgium	DNF	
	2	John-Henry Krueger	United States		PEN
1	3	Lim Hyo-jun	South Korea	2:11.389	QA
2	3	Hwang Dae-heon	South Korea	2:11.469	QA
3	3	Itzhak de Laat	Netherlands	2:11.781	ADV
4	3	Han Tianyu	China	2:11.827	QB
5	3	Sébastien Lepape	France	2:11.967	
6	3	Xu Hongzhi	China	2:19.310	
	3	Shaoang Liu	Hungary		PEN
	3	Wu Dajing	China		PEN

=== Finals ===
==== Final B (classification round) ====
In this race, six skaters race for placement.

Rank	Name	Country	Time	Notes
8	Han Tianyu	China	2:26.281	
9	Seo Yi-ra	South Korea	2:26.346	
10	Pascal Dion	Canada	2:26.412	
11	Roberto Puķītis	Latvia	2:26.525	
12	Aaron Tran	United States	2:27.127	

==== Final A (medal round) ====
In the final heat of the event, Hwang Dae-heon collided with Thibaut Fauconnet, with Fauconnet receiving a skate to the face. Defending champion Charles Hamelin did not finish the race. South Korean Lim Hyo-jun finished in first winning by about two blade lengths. He followed closely by Sjinkie Knegt and Semion Elistratov, finishing in second and third respectively. Lim said, "I was nervous in the preliminaries but I liked the quality of the ice. I knew if I made it to the final I had good chances".

The official podium ceremony was the next day, but there was a venue ceremony at the event. The competitors were presented with a plush-tiger Soohorang, one of the Olympic mascots.

Rank	Name	Country	Time	Notes
1st place, gold medalist(s)	Lim Hyo-jun	South Korea	2:10.485	OR
2nd place, silver medalist(s)	Sjinkie Knegt	Netherlands	2:10.555	
3rd place, bronze medalist(s)	Semion Elistratov	Olympic Athletes from Russia	2:10.687	
4	Samuel Girard	Canada	2:11.176	
5	Sándor Liu Shaolin	Hungary	2:11.520	
6	Itzhak de Laat	Netherlands	2:12.362	
7	Thibaut Fauconnet	France	2:53.150	
13	Charles Hamelin	Canada		PEN
14	Hwang Dae-heon	South Korea	DNF	
