= Short-track speed skating at the 2014 Winter Olympics – Men's 1500 metres =

Men's 1500 metres at the XXII Olympic Winter Games
- Pictogram for short track
- Venue: Iceberg Skating Palace; Sochi, Russia
- Dates: 10 February 2014 (qualifying heats, semifinal, and final)
- Competitors: 36 from 18 nations
- Winning time: 2:14.985

Medalists
1st place, gold medalist(s)		Charles Hamelin	Canada
2nd place, silver medalist(s)		Han Tianyu	China
3rd place, bronze medalist(s)		Viktor Ahn	Russia

The men's 1500 metres in short track speed skating at the 2014 Winter Olympics was held on 10 February 2014 at the Iceberg Skating Palace in Sochi, Russia.

The qualifying heats, semifinal, and the final were held on 10 February.

The defending Olympic Champion was Lee Jung-su of South Korea, while the defending World Champion was Sin Da-woon also of South Korea.

== Records ==
World record	Noh Jin-kyu (KOR)	2:09.041	Shanghai, China	10 December 2011
Olympic record	Lee Jung-su (KOR)	2:10.949	Vancouver, Canada	13 February 2010

== Qualification ==
Countries were assigned quotas using a combination of the four special Olympic Qualification classifications that were held at two world cups in November 2013. A nation may enter a maximum of three athletes per event. For this event a total of 36 athletes representing 18 nations qualified to compete.

== Results ==
The final results:

=== Preliminaries ===
==== Heats ====
Q – qualified for the semifinals
ADV – advanced
PEN – penalty
YC – yellow card

Rank	Heat	Name	Country	Time	Notes
1	1	Jack Whelbourne	Great Britain	2:14.091	Q
2	1	Yuri Confortola	Italy	2:14.143	Q
3	1	Sjinkie Knegt	Netherlands	2:14.249	Q
4	1	Robert Seifert	Germany	2:16.555	
5	1	Roberto Puķītis	Latvia	2:30.671	ADV
–	1	Yuzo Takamido	Japan		PEN
1	2	Viktor Ahn	Russia	2:20.865	Q
2	2	Han Tianyu	China	2:20.911	Q
3	2	Park Se-yeong	South Korea	2:21.087	Q
4	2	Vladislav Bykanov	Israel	2:21.163	
5	2	Pan-To Barton Lui	Hong Kong	2:22.139	
6	2	Viktor Knoch	Hungary	2:47.714	
1	3	Sin Da-woon	South Korea	2:15.530	Q
2	3	J. R. Celski	United States	2:15.675	Q
3	3	Sébastien Lepape	France	2:15.806	Q
4	3	Ryosuke Sakazume	Japan	2:17.985	
5	3	Maksim Siarheyeu	Belarus	2:19.505	
6	3	Shi Jingnan	China	2:51.512	
1	4	Charles Hamelin	Canada	2:16.903	Q
2	4	Semen Elistratov	Russia	2:16.904	Q
3	4	Eduardo Alvarez	United States	2:17.532	Q
4	4	Maxime Chataignier	France	2:17.938	
5	4	Aidar Bekzhanov	Kazakhstan	2:19.713	
6	4	Bence Béres	Hungary	2:20.327	
1	5	Niels Kerstholt	Netherlands	2:13.848	Q, NR
2	5	François Hamelin	Canada	2:13.935	Q
3	5	Thibaut Fauconnet	France	2:14.054	Q
4	5	Sándor Liu Shaolin	Hungary	2:14.055	
5	5	Vojtěch Loudín	Czech Republic	2:14.906	
6	5	Denis Nikisha	Kazakhstan	2:16.452	
1	6	Lee Han-bin	South Korea	2:16.412	Q
2	6	Michael Gilday	Canada	2:16.468	Q
3	6	Chen Dequan	China	2:16.535	Q
4	6	Christopher Creveling	United States	2:16.553	
5	6	Tommaso Dotti	Italy	2:17.300	
6	6	Satoshi Sakashita	Japan	2:18.298	

==== Semifinals ====
QA – qualified for Final A
QB – qualified for Final B
ADV – advanced
PEN – penalty
YC – yellow card

Rank	Heat	Name	Country	Time	Notes
1	1	Han Tianyu	China	2:15.858	QA
2	1	Viktor Ahn	Russia	2:16.000	QA
3	1	Park Se-yeong	South Korea	2:16.241	QB
4	1	François Hamelin	Canada	2:16.473	QB
5	1	Roberto Puķītis	Latvia	2:16.961	
6	1	Niels Kerstholt	Netherlands	2:17.134	
–	1	Thibaut Fauconnet	France		PEN
1	2	J. R. Celski	United States	2:21.603	QA
2	2	Chen Dequan	China	2:21.697	QA
3	2	Sébastien Lepape	France	2:23.995	QB
4	2	Sin Da-woon	South Korea	2:52.061	QB
5	2	Lee Han-bin	South Korea	3:11.810	ADV
–	2	Michael Gilday	Canada		PEN
1	3	Charles Hamelin	Canada	2:14.480	QA
2	3	Jack Whelbourne	Great Britain	2:14.635	QA
3	3	Sjinkie Knegt	Netherlands	2:14.677	QB
4	3	Semen Elistratov	Russia	2:14.783	QB
5	3	Yuri Confortola	Italy	2:19.086	
–	3	Eduardo Alvarez	United States		PEN

=== Finals ===
==== Final B (classification round) ====
Rank	Name	Country	Time	Notes
8	Sébastien Lepape	France	2:21.483	
9	François Hamelin	Canada	2:21.592	
10	Sin Da-woon	South Korea	2:22.066	
11	Semen Elistratov	Russia	2:24.352	
12	Sjinkie Knegt	Netherlands	2:39.581	
–	Park Se-yeong	South Korea		PEN

==== Final A (medal round) ====
Rank	Name	Country	Time	Notes
1st place, gold medalist(s)	Charles Hamelin	Canada	2:14.985	
2nd place, silver medalist(s)	Han Tianyu	China	2:15.055	
3rd place, bronze medalist(s)	Viktor Ahn	Russia	2:15.062	
4	J. R. Celski	United States	2:15.624	
5	Chen Dequan	China	2:15.626	
6	Lee Han-bin	South Korea	2:16.466	
7	Jack Whelbourne	Great Britain		no time

== Final standings ==
The final overall standings were:

Rank	Name	Country
1st place, gold medalist(s)	Charles Hamelin	Canada
2nd place, silver medalist(s)	Han Tianyu	China
3rd place, bronze medalist(s)	Viktor Ahn	Russia
4	J. R. Celski	United States
5	Chen Dequan	China
6	Lee Han-bin	South Korea
7	Jack Whelbourne	Great Britain
8	Sébastien Lepape	France
9	François Hamelin	Canada
10	Sin Da-woon	South Korea
11	Semen Elistratov	Russia
12	Sjinkie Knegt	Netherlands
13	Park Se-yeong	South Korea
14	Yuri Confortola	Italy
15	Roberto Puķītis	Latvia
16	Niels Kerstholt	Netherlands
17	Michael Gilday	Canada
18	Sébastien Lepape	France
19	Eduardo Alvarez	United States
20	Sándor Liu Shaolin	Hungary
21	Christopher Creveling	United States
22	Robert Seifert	Germany
23	Maxime Chataignier	France
24	Ryosuke Sakazume	Japan
25	Vladislav Bykanov	Israel
26	Vojtěch Loudín	Czech Republic
27	Tommaso Dotti	Italy
28	Maksim Siarheyeu	Belarus
29	Aidar Bekzhanov	Kazakhstan
30	Pan-To Barton Lui	Hong Kong
31	Denis Nikisha	Kazakhstan
32	Satoshi Sakashita	Japan
33	Bence Béres	Hungary
34	Viktor Knoch	Hungary
35	Shi Jingnan	China
–	Yuzo Takamido	Japan
