= Short-track speed skating at the 2018 Winter Olympics – Men's 1000 metres =

Men's 1000 metres at the XXIII Olympic Winter Games
- Venue: Gangneung Ice Arena; Gangneung, South Korea
- Dates: 13 February 2018 (heats); 17 February 2018 (quarterfinals, semifinals, final)
- Competitors: 32 from 14 nations
- Winning time: 1:24.650

Medalists
1st place, gold medalist(s)		Samuel Girard	Canada
2nd place, silver medalist(s)		John-Henry Krueger	United States
3rd place, bronze medalist(s)		Seo Yi-ra	South Korea

The men's 1000 metres in short track speed skating at the 2018 Winter Olympics took place on 13 and 17 February 2018 at the Gangneung Ice Arena in Gangneung, South Korea. Samuel Girard won gold, John-Henry Krueger took the silver medal, and Seo Yi-ra won bronze. For all of them, this was their first Olympic medal.

Charles Hamelin set an Olympic record in the heats but was disqualified in semifinals. In Final A, Sándor Liu Shaolin, trying to pass from the inside, interfered with one of the competitors, which resulted in the fall of both Lim Hyo-jun and Seo Yi-ra. The two remaining contenders, Girard and Krueger, became gold and silver medalists. Liu Shaolin was disqualified, and Seo Yi-ra won the bronze medal by standing after the fall and crossing the finish line first.

== Records ==
Prior to this competition, the existing world and Olympic records were as follows.

World record	Hwang Dae-heon (KOR)	1:20.875	Salt Lake City, United States	12 November 2016
Olympic record	Lee Jung-su (KOR)	1:23.747	Vancouver, Canada	20 February 2010

One Olympic record was set during the competition.

Date	Round	Athlete	Country	Time	Record	Ref
13 February	Heat 5	Charles Hamelin	Canada	1:23.407	OR	

== Results ==
=== Heats ===
Q – qualified for the quarterfinals
ADV – advanced
PEN – penalty
YC – yellow card
OR - olympic record

Rank	Heat	Name	Country	Time	Notes
1	1	John-Henry Krueger	United States	1:25.913	Q
2	1	Farrell Treacy	Great Britain	1:26.762	Q
3	1	Ryosuke Sakazume	Japan	DNF	ADV
	1	Shaoang Liu	Hungary		PEN
1	2	Lim Hyo-jun	South Korea	1:23.971	Q
2	2	Kazuki Yoshinaga	Japan	1:24.030	Q
3	2	Charle Cournoyer	Canada	1:24.051	
4	2	Daan Breeuwsma	Netherlands	1:24.429	
1	3	Samuel Girard	Canada	1:23.894	Q
2	3	Semion Elistratov	Olympic Athletes from Russia	1:23.979	Q
3	3	Keita Watanabe	Japan	1:24.078	
4	3	Nurbergen Zhumagaziyev	Kazakhstan	1:24.271	
1	4	Sjinkie Knegt	Netherlands	1:23.823	Q
2	4	Thibaut Fauconnet	France	1:24.381	Q
3	4	Roberts Zvejnieks	Latvia	1:26.408	ADV
	4	Ren Ziwei	China		PEN
1	5	Charles Hamelin	Canada	1:23.407	Q, OR
2	5	Wu Dajing	China	1:23.463	Q
3	5	Sébastien Lepape	France	1:23.489	
4	5	Aleksandr Shulginov	Olympic Athletes from Russia	1:31.133	
1	6	Itzhak de Laat	Netherlands	1:24.639	Q
2	6	Seo Yi-ra	South Korea	1:24.734	Q
3	6	Tommaso Dotti	Italy	1:25.369	
	6	Han Tianyu	China		PEN
1	7	Hwang Dae-heon	South Korea	1:24.457	Q
2	7	Yuri Confortola	Italy	1:25.297	Q
3	7	Josh Cheetham	Great Britain	1:26.223	
	7	Vladislav Bykanov	Israel		PEN
1	8	Sándor Liu Shaolin	Hungary	1:31.547	Q
2	8	Roberto Puķītis	Latvia	1:31.635	Q
3	8	J. R. Celski	United States	1:31.812	
	8	Pavel Sitnikov	Olympic Athletes from Russia		PEN

=== Quarterfinals ===
Q – qualified for Semifinals
ADV – advanced
PEN – penalty
YC – yellow card

Rank	Heat	Name	Country	Time	Notes
1	1	Seo Yi-ra	South Korea	1:24.053	Q
2	1	Lim Hyo-jun	South Korea	1:24.095	Q
3	1	Thibaut Fauconnet	France	1:24.344	
	1	Hwang Dae-heon	South Korea		PEN
1	2	Samuel Girard	Canada	1:24.289	Q
2	2	Yuri Confortola	Italy	1:24.383	Q
3	2	Itzhak de Laat	Netherlands	1:24.423	
4	2	Kazuki Yoshinaga	Japan	1:24.649	
1	3	Semion Elistratov	Olympic Athletes from Russia	1:23.893	Q
2	3	Ryosuke Sakazume	Japan	1:24.099	Q
3	3	John-Henry Krueger	United States	1:24.598	ADV
4	3	Farrell Treacy	Great Britain	1:25.080	
	3	Sjinkie Knegt	Netherlands		PEN
1	4	Sándor Liu Shaolin	Hungary	1:24.012	Q
2	4	Charles Hamelin	Canada	1:24.015	Q
3	4	Roberto Puķītis	Latvia	1:24.022	
4	4	Roberts Zvejnieks	Latvia	1:24.306	
	4	Wu Dajing	China		PEN

=== Semifinals ===
QA – qualified for Final A
QB – qualified for Final B
ADV – advanced
PEN – penalty
YC – yellow card

Rank	Heat	Name	Country	Time	Notes
1	1	Lim Hyo-jun	South Korea	1:26.463	QA
2	1	Sándor Liu Shaolin	Hungary	1:26.488	QA
3	1	Yuri Confortola	Italy	1:26.626	QB
4	1	Semion Elistratov	Olympic Athletes from Russia	1:26.773	QB
1	2	John-Henry Krueger	United States	1:24.187	QA
2	2	Seo Yi-ra	South Korea	1:24.252	QA
3	2	Ryosuke Sakazume	Japan	1:24.317	QB
4	2	Samuel Girard	Canada	1:25.102	ADV
	2	Charles Hamelin	Canada		PEN

=== Final B ===
Rank	Name	Country	Time	Notes
5	Ryosuke Sakazume	Japan	1:27.522	
6	Semion Elistratov	Olympic Athletes from Russia	1:27.621	
7	Yuri Confortola	Italy	1:27.712	

=== Final A ===
The final was held on 17 February 2018 at 21:24.

Rank	Name	Country	Time	Notes
1st place, gold medalist(s)	Samuel Girard	Canada	1:24.650	
2nd place, silver medalist(s)	John-Henry Krueger	United States	1:24.864	
3rd place, bronze medalist(s)	Seo Yi-ra	South Korea	1:31.619	
4	Lim Hyo-jun	South Korea	1:33.312	
8	Sándor Liu Shaolin	Hungary		PEN
