= Short-track speed skating at the 2014 Winter Olympics – Men's 1000 metres =

Men's 1000 metres at the XXII Olympic Winter Games
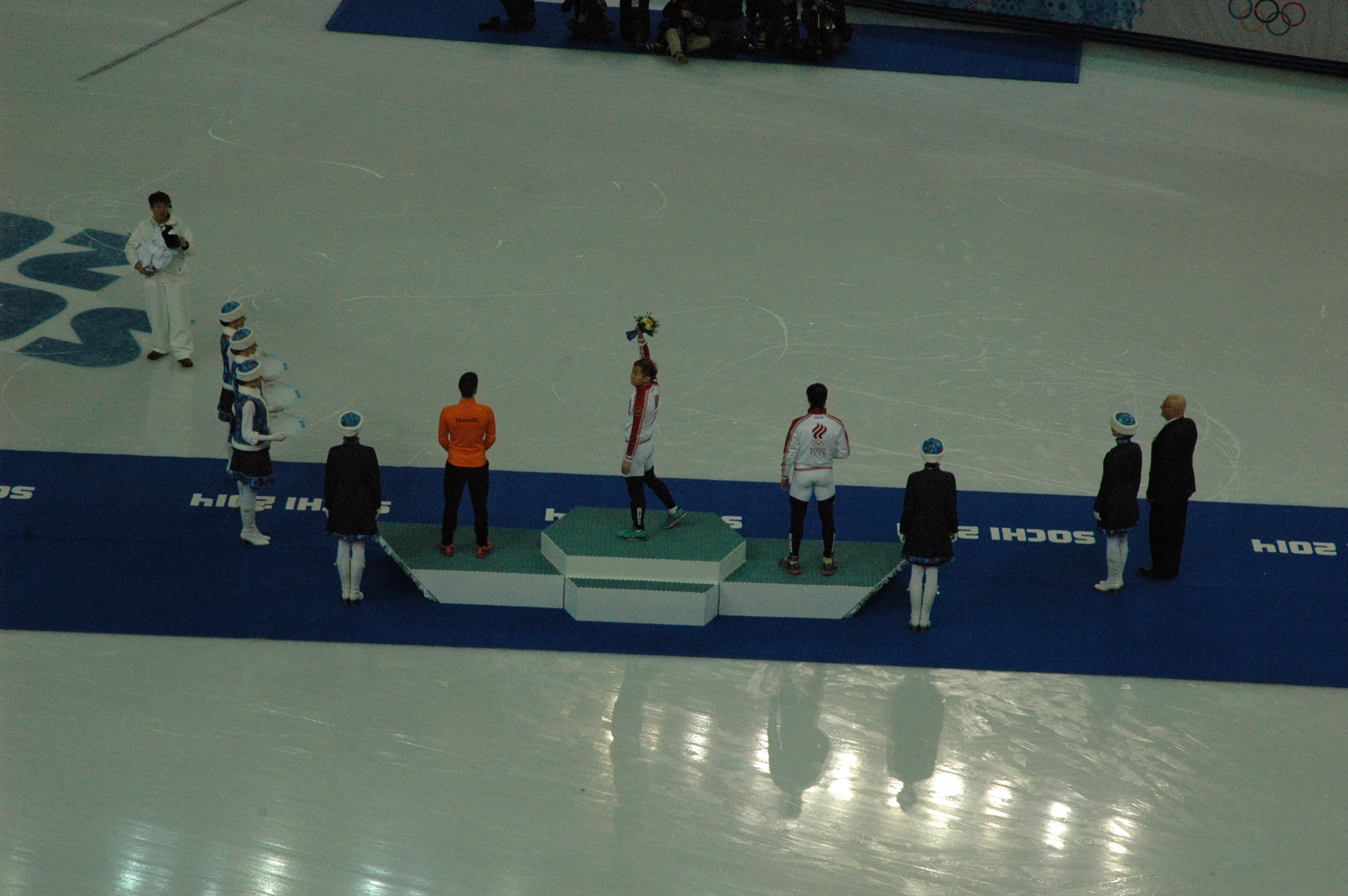
- Podium
- Venue: Iceberg Skating Palace; Sochi, Russia
- Dates: 13 February 2014 (qualifying heats); 15 February 2014 (quarterfinal, semifinal, and final)
- Competitors: 32 from 14 nations
- Winning time: 1:25.325

Medalists
1st place, gold medalist(s)		Viktor Ahn	Russia
2nd place, silver medalist(s)		Vladimir Grigorev	Russia
3rd place, bronze medalist(s)		Sjinkie Knegt	Netherlands

The men's 1000 metres in short track speed skating at the 2014 Winter Olympics was held between 13–15 February 2014 at the Iceberg Skating Palace in Sochi, Russia.

The qualifying heats were held on 13 February with the quarterfinal, the semifinal and the final were held on 15 February.

The 2010 Olympic Champion was Lee Jung-Su of South Korea, who did not run. The defending World Champion was Sin Da-woon, also of South Korea. He did not win a medal.

Viktor Ahn and Vladimir Grigorev, both of Russia, won the gold and the silver medals, respectively. Sjinkie Knegt of the Netherlands became third. The medals of Ahn and Grigorev became the first ever gold and silver medals of Russia in short track speed skating, whereas the medal of Knegt became the first ever medal of the Netherlands in short track speed skating.

Gold medal won in this event featured Chelyabinsk meteor fragment to commemorate at first anniversary of this meteor strike.

== Qualification ==
Countries were assigned quotas using a combination of the four special Olympic Qualification classifications that were held at two world cups in November 2013. A nation may enter a maximum of three athletes per event. For this event a total of 32 athletes representing 14 nations qualified to compete.

== Results ==
The final results:

=== Preliminaries ===
Q – qualified for Quarterfinals
ADV – advanced
PEN – penalty

Rank	Heat	Name	Country	Time	Notes
1	1	Charle Cournoyer	Canada	1:24.787	Q
2	1	Chris Creveling	United States	1:25.069	Q
3	1	Niels Kerstholt	Netherlands	1:25.695	
4	1	Jon Eley	Great Britain	1:25.748	
1	2	Olivier Jean	Canada	1:26.089	Q
2	2	Sjinkie Knegt	Netherlands	1:26.091	Q
3	2	Mackenzie Blackburn	Chinese Taipei	1:26.814	
4	2	Bence Béres	Hungary	1:27.735	
1	3	Vladimir Grigorev	Russia	1:26.422	Q
2	3	Han Tianyu	China	1:26.530	Q
3	3	Vladislav Bykanov	Israel	1:27.796	
4	3	Richard Shoebridge	Great Britain	1:27.806	
1	4	Wu Dajing	China	1:24.950	Q
2	4	Viktor Knoch	Hungary	1:25.426	Q
3	4	Sébastien Lepape	France	1:49.311	ADV
–	4	Freek van der Wart	Netherlands		PEN
1	5	Charles Hamelin	Canada	1:25.742	Q
2	5	Eddy Alvarez	United States	1:26.070	Q
3	5	Jack Whelbourne	Great Britain	1:26.086	
4	5	Liang Wenhao	China	1:28.065	
1	6	J. R. Celski	United States	1:25.428	Q
2	6	Semion Elistratov	Russia	1:26.121	Q
3	6	Ryosuke Sakazume	Japan	1:26.468	
4	6	Maxime Chataignier	France	2:20.479	
1	7	Viktor Ahn	Russia	1:25.834	Q
2	7	Sin Da-woon	South Korea	1:25.893	Q
3	7	Yuzo Takamido	Japan	1:25.905	
4	7	Robert Seifert	Germany	1:29.468	
1	8	Lee Han-bin	South Korea	1:26.502	Q
2	8	Yuri Confortola	Italy	1:26.956	Q
3	8	Sándor Liu Shaolin	Hungary	1:35.935	ADV
4	8	Thibaut Fauconnet	France	2:00.795	

==== Quarterfinal ====
Q – qualified for the semifinals
ADV – advanced
PEN – penalty
YC – yellow card

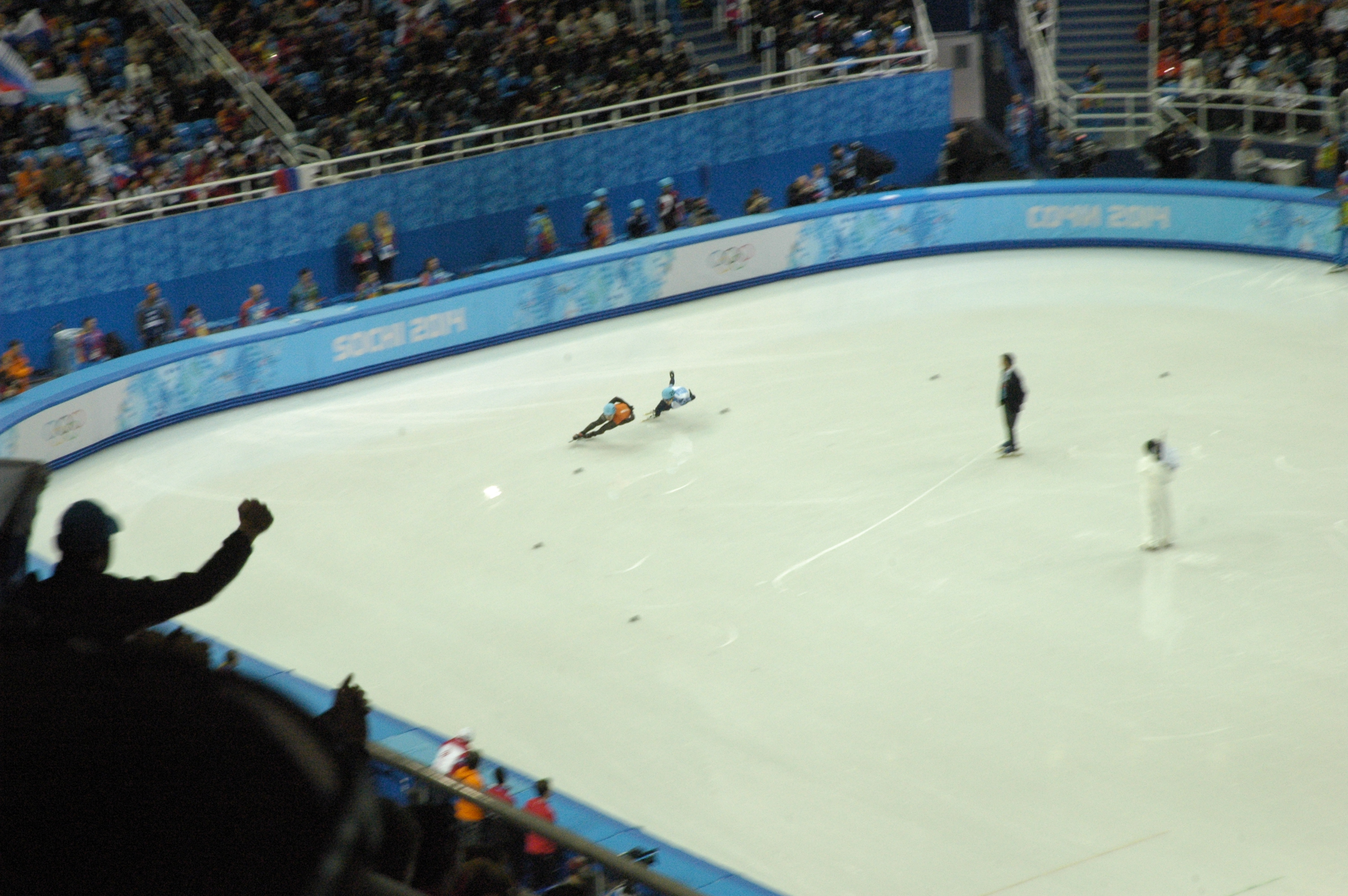
Quarterfinal 3

Rank	Quarterfinal	Name	Country	Time	Notes
1	1	Lee Han-bin	South Korea	1:24.444	Q
2	1	Han Tianyu	China	1:24.490	Q
3	1	Chris Creveling	United States	1:24.691	
4	1	Sándor Liu Shaolin	Hungary	1.24.966	
5	1	Charle Cournoyer	Canada	1:25.204	
1	2	Wu Dajing	China	1:24.753	Q
2	2	Vladimir Grigorev	Russia	1:24.868	Q
3	2	Sébastien Lepape	France	1:25.368	
4	2	Yuri Confortola	Italy	1:25.428	
5	2	Viktor Knoch	Hungary	1:25.673	
1	3	Viktor Ahn	Russia	1:25.666	Q
2	3	Sjinkie Knegt	Netherlands	1:25.695	Q
3	3	Eddy Alvarez	United States	1:39.092	
4	3	Charles Hamelin	Canada	1:40.408	
1	4	Sin Da-woon	South Korea	1:24.215	Q
2	4	Semion Elistratov	Russia	1:24.239	Q
3	4	Olivier Jean	Canada	1:24.935	
–	4	J. R. Celski	United States	DNF	

==== Semifinals ====
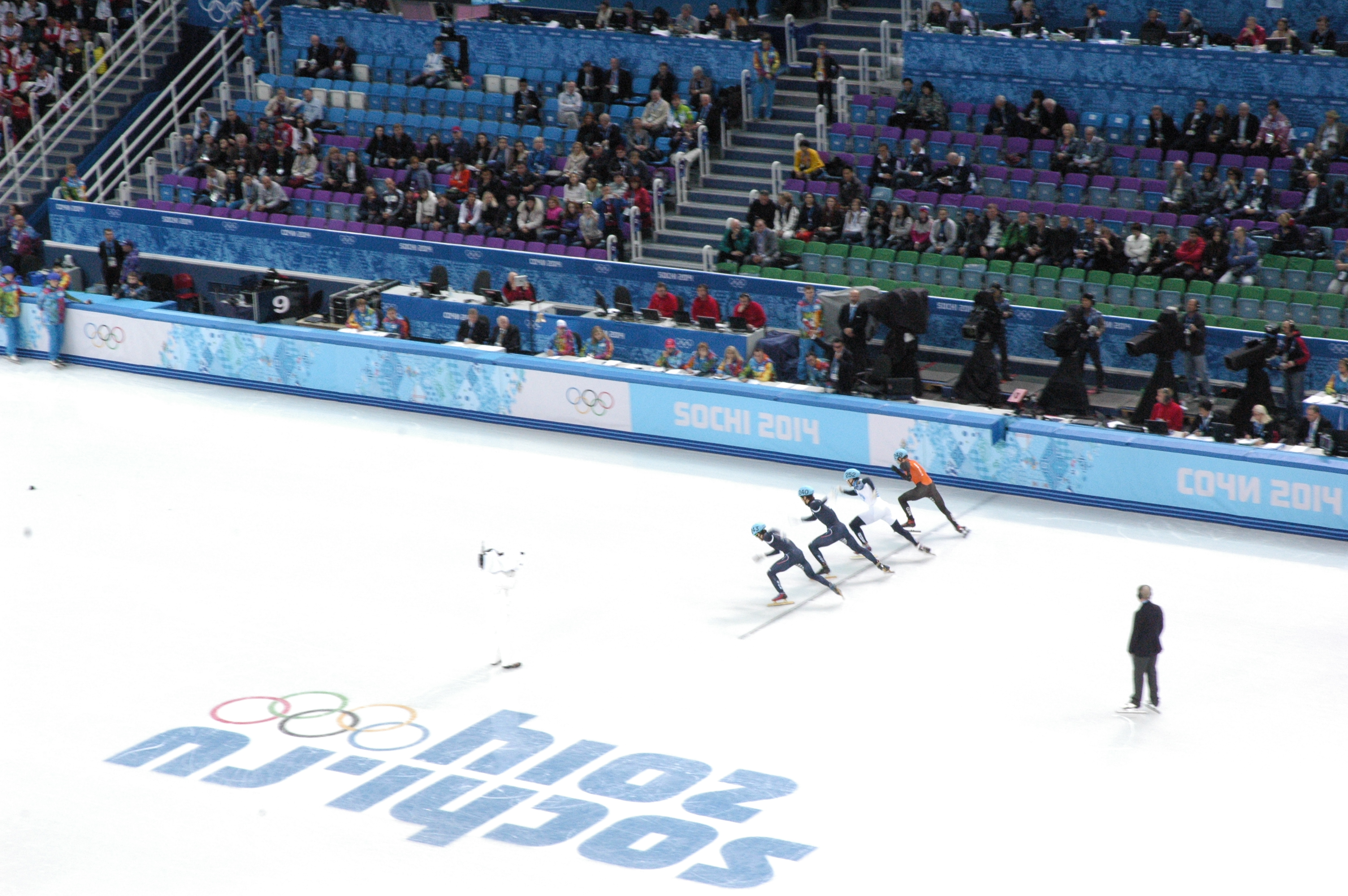
Semifinal 1

Rank	Semifinal	Name	Country	Time	Notes
1	1	Vladimir Grigorev	Russia	1:25.346	QA
2	1	Sin Da-woon	South Korea	1:25.564	QA
3	1	Sjinkie Knegt	Netherlands	1:27.258	ADV
–	1	Lee Han-bin	South Korea		PEN
1	2	Viktor Ahn	Russia	1:24.102	QA
2	2	Wu Dajing	China	1:24.239	QA
3	2	Semion Elistratov	Russia	1:24.275	QB
4	2	Han Tianyu	China	1:24.611	QB

=== Finals ===
==== Final B (Classification Round) ====
Rank	Name	Country	Time	Notes
5	Han Tianyu	China	1:29.334	
6	Semion Elistratov	Russia	1:29.429	

==== Final A (Medal Round) ====
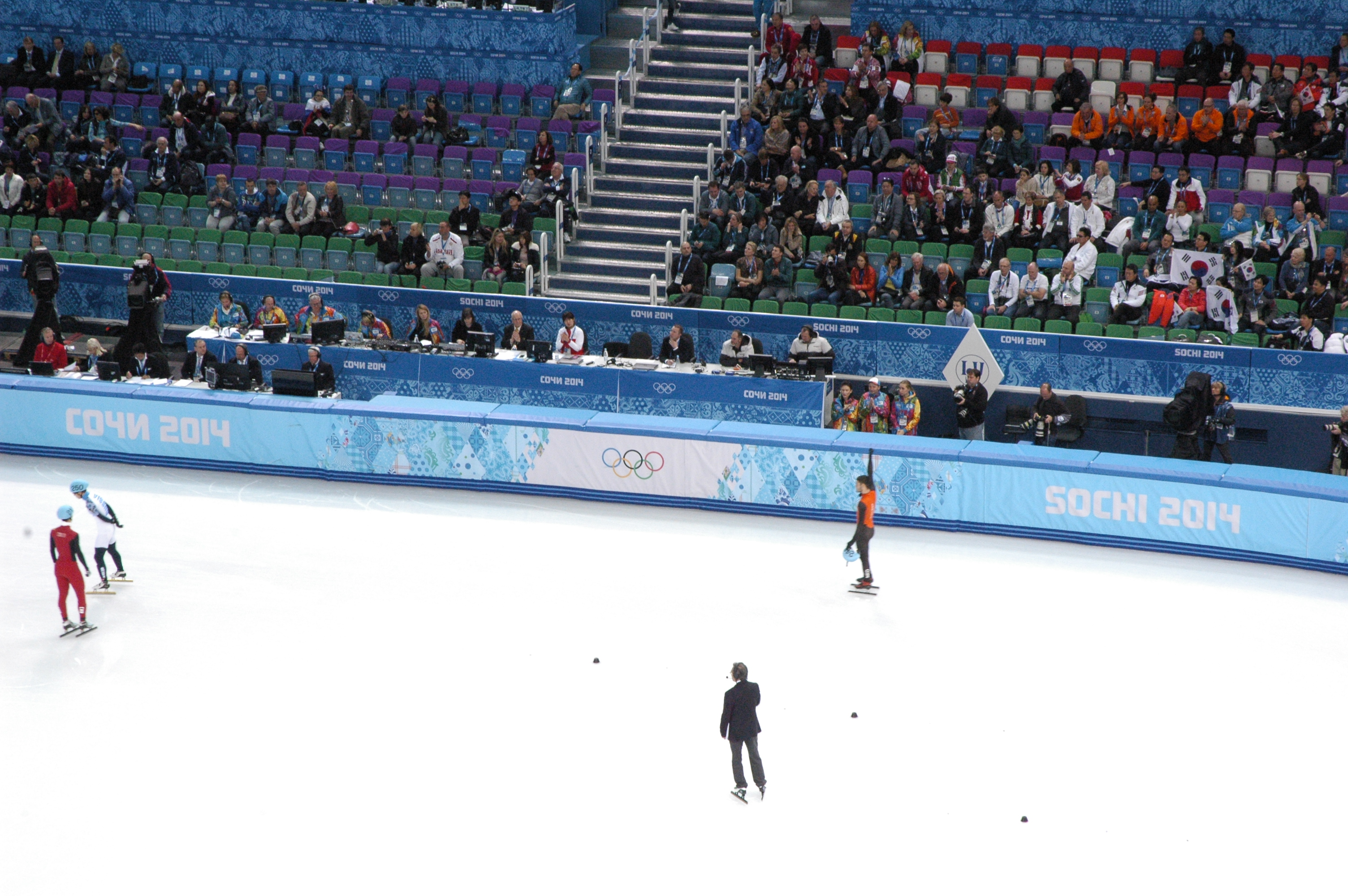
Sjinkie Knegt celebrating his bronze medal

Rank	Name	Country	Time	Notes
1st place, gold medalist(s)	Viktor Ahn	Russia	1:25.325	
2nd place, silver medalist(s)	Vladimir Grigorev	Russia	1:25.399	
3rd place, bronze medalist(s)	Sjinkie Knegt	Netherlands	1:25.611	
4	Wu Dajing	China	1:25.772	
–	Sin Da-woon	South Korea		PEN

== Final standings ==
The final overall standings were:

Rank	Name	Country
1st place, gold medalist(s)	Viktor Ahn	Russia
2nd place, silver medalist(s)	Vladimir Grigorev	Russia
3rd place, bronze medalist(s)	Sjinkie Knegt	Netherlands
4	Wu Dajing	China
5	Han Tianyu	China
6	Semion Elistratov	Russia
7	Sin Da-woon	South Korea
8	Lee Han-bin	South Korea
9	Olivier Jean	Canada
10	Chris Creveling	United States
11	Eddy Alvarez	United States
12	Sébastien Lepape	France
13	J. R. Celski	United States
14	Charles Hamelin	Canada
15	Yuri Confortola	Italy
16	Sándor Liu Shaolin	Hungary
17	Charle Cournoyer	Canada
18	Viktor Knoch	Hungary
19	Niels Kerstholt	Netherlands
20	Yuzo Takamido	Japan
21	Jack Whelbourne	Great Britain
22	Ryosuke Sakazume	Japan
23	Mackenzie Blackburn	Chinese Taipei
24	Vladislav Bykanov	Israel
25	Jon Eley	Great Britain
26	Bence Béres	Hungary
27	Richard Shoebridge	Great Britain
28	Liang Wenhao	China
29	Robert Seifert	Germany
30	Thibaut Fauconnet	France
31	Maxime Chataignier	France
–	Freek van der Wart	Netherlands
