= Short-track speed skating at the 2018 Winter Olympics – Qualification =

The following is about the qualification rules and the quota allocation for the short track speed skating at the 2018 Winter Olympics.

== Qualification rules ==
A total quota of 120 athletes were allowed to compete at the Games (60 men and 60 women). Countries were assigned quotas based on their performance during the 2017–18 ISU Short Track Speed Skating World Cup. Each nation was permitted to enter a maximum of five athletes per gender if it qualified a relay team and three if it did not. Hosts South Korea were guaranteed the full quota of ten athletes. There were a maximum of thirty-two qualifiers for the 500m and 1000m events; thirty-six for the 1500m events; and eight for the relays.

== Quota allocation ==
Final quotas were published by the ISU on 23 November 2017. North Korea was allowed to add two entries on 20 January 2018.

Nations	Men's 500m	Men's 1000m	Men's 1500m	Men's relay	Women's 500m	Women's 1000m	Women's 1500m	Women's relay	Athletes
Australia	1		1			1	1		2
Belarus			1						1
Belgium			2						2
Canada	2	3	3	X	3	3	3	X	10
China	3	3	3	X	3	3	3	X	10
Czech Republic							1		1
France	2	2	2		2	1	2		4
Germany			~~1~~		2	2	2		2
Great Britain		2	1		3	3	3		5
Hungary	3	2	3	X	2	2	2	X	10
Israel	1	1	1						1
Italy	1	2	2		3	2	2	X	7
Japan	2	3	3	X	1	2	3	X	10
Kazakhstan	3	1	2	X	1	2	2		7
Latvia	1	2	1						2
Netherlands	3	3	2	X	3	3	2	X	10
North Korea	1		1						2
Poland	1				2	1	1		3
Olympic Athletes from Russia	3	3	3		2	2	2	X	7
Singapore							1		1
South Korea	3	3	3	X	3	3	3	X	10
~~Sweden~~			~~1~~						~~1~~
United States	3	2	3	X	2	2	3		8
Total: 22 NOCs	33	32	37	8	32	32	36	8	115 (59 men/56 women)

Great Britain and Kazakhstan received reallocated spots in the men's 1500m and Kazakhstan received the men's relay spot initially awarded to OAR. Team OAR remained qualified in the women's relay, but only used four of the available five quotas.

== Relays ==
Nations could compete in four world cup races, and were ranked by their three best scores. Bolded nations are qualified.

=== Men's ===
	Vacancies	Athletes per team	Nation
	8	5	**Canada**; **South Korea**; **United States**; **China**; **Netherlands**; **Japan**; ~~Olympic Athletes from Russia~~; **Hungary**; **Kazakhstan**; Belgium; France; Italy; Great Britain; Latvia
Total	8	40	

=== Women's ===
	Vacancies	Athletes per team	Nation
	8	5	**South Korea**; **China**; **Canada**; **Olympic Athletes from Russia**; **Netherlands**; **Italy**; **Japan**; **Hungary**; France; Germany; United States; Poland; Kazakhstan; Great Britain
Total	8	40	

== Individual distances ==
The first placed racer (per nation) was ranked based on the three best world cup results, out of four, for each race. This means that multiple skaters could have a part in that score, and ranking. The second and third best were ranked in the same way. For the 500m and 1000m the top 32 qualified, and for the 1500m the top 36 qualified. The next best six nations for each race are shown.

Indicates the second best qualifier for a nation
Indicates the third best qualifier for a nation

=== 500 Meters ===
World cup rank	Men's team
1	China
2	Hungary
3	South Korea
4	Canada
5	South Korea
6	Netherlands
7	Hungary
8	China
9	South Korea
10	Kazakhstan
11	United States
12	Japan
13	Canada
14	Netherlands
15	Olympic Athletes from Russia
16	Israel
17	Poland
18	Australia
19	Latvia
20	United States
21	Kazakhstan
22	Japan
23	France
24	Olympic Athletes from Russia
25	China
26	Kazakhstan
27	Netherlands
28	Olympic Athletes from Russia
29	Italy
30	France
31	Hungary
32	United States
33	Canada
34	France
35	Great Britain
36	Japan
37	Germany
38	Belarus

World cup rank	Women's team
1	Canada
2	Italy
3	South Korea
4	Canada
5	Great Britain
6	China
7	Netherlands
8	Italy
9	South Korea
10	United States
11	Olympic Athletes from Russia
12	Poland
13	Netherlands
14	Hungary
15	France
16	Italy
17	China
18	Great Britain
19	Canada
20	Netherlands
21	Poland
22	Germany
23	Japan
24	Kazakhstan
25	Hungary
26	South Korea
27	China
28	France
29	United States
30	Olympic Athletes from Russia
31	Germany
32	Great Britain
33	Japan
34	United States
35	Australia
36	Sweden
37	Kazakhstan
38	Hungary

=== 1000 Meters ===
World cup rank	Men's team
1	South Korea
2	China
3	Hungary
4	Canada
5	Netherlands
6	South Korea
7	United States
8	China
9	Olympic Athletes from Russia
10	Canada
11	Hungary
12	Israel
13	Italy
14	Japan
15	South Korea
16	Latvia
17	France
18	China
19	Olympic Athletes from Russia
20	United States
21	Canada
22	Japan
23	Olympic Athletes from Russia
24	Great Britain
25	Netherlands
26	Italy
27	France
28	Japan
29	Great Britain
30	Kazakhstan
31	Latvia
32	Netherlands
33	United States
34	Kazakhstan
35	Hungary
36	North Korea
37	Turkey
38	Kazakhstan

World cup rank	Women's team
1	South Korea
2	Canada
3	Netherlands
4	South Korea
5	Canada
6	Great Britain
7	Netherlands
8	Italy
9	Olympic Athletes from Russia
10	Netherlands
11	China
12	United States
13	Japan
14	Canada
15	Australia
16	Kazakhstan
17	France
18	Hungary
19	South Korea
20	Olympic Athletes from Russia
21	Poland
22	China
23	Great Britain
24	Great Britain
25	United States
26	Germany
27	Hungary
28	Kazakhstan
29	China
30	Germany
31	Japan
32	Italy
33	Japan
34	France
35	Poland
36	Olympic Athletes from Russia
37	Belgium
38	Lithuania

=== 1500 Meters ===
World cup rank	Men's team
1	South Korea
2	Netherlands
3	Canada
4	South Korea
5	Hungary
6	South Korea
7	China
8	United States
9	Hungary
10	Canada
11	France
12	Israel
13	Netherlands
14	France
15	Olympic Athletes from Russia
16	Italy
17	United States
18	Olympic Athletes from Russia
19	Japan
20	China
21	Latvia
22	Canada
23	Japan
24	Kazakhstan
25	Hungary
26	Belgium
27	China
28	Italy
29	Japan
30	Olympic Athletes from Russia
31	United States
32	Australia
33	Belarus
34	Belgium
35	~~Sweden~~
36	~~Germany~~
37	**Great Britain**
38	**Kazakhstan**
39	France
40	Australia
41	Chinese Taipei
42	Turkey

World cup rank	Women's team
1	South Korea
2	Canada
3	South Korea
4	Canada
5	South Korea
6	Australia
7	Great Britain
8	Netherlands
9	China
10	Italy
11	Canada
12	Olympic Athletes from Russia
13	Hungary
14	China
15	United States
16	Kazakhstan
17	Netherlands
18	France
19	Great Britain
20	Germany
21	Olympic Athletes from Russia
22	Japan
23	Kazakhstan
24	United States
25	Japan
26	Hungary
27	Poland
28	United States
29	Czech Republic
30	Great Britain
31	Singapore
32	Italy
33	China
34	Japan
35	Germany
36	France
37	Bulgaria
38	Olympic Athletes from Russia
39	Belgium
40	Czech Republic
41	Netherlands
42	Lithuania
