= Zvejnieks =

Family name

Origin
- Origin: Latvian
- Meaning: "fisherman"

Zvejnieks (Old orthography: Sweineek(s); feminine: Zvejniece) is a Latvian occupational surname, derived from the Latvian word for "fisherman". Notable people with the surname include:

- Alberts Zvejnieks, Latvian wrestler
- Kristaps Zvejnieks (born 1992), an Alpine ski racer and inline Alpine slalom race;
- Roberts Zvejnieks (born 1997), a short track speed skater.

== See also ==
- Zvejnieks Liepāja, Latvian football club
