= Eddy Alvarez =

American speed skater and baseball player (born 1990)

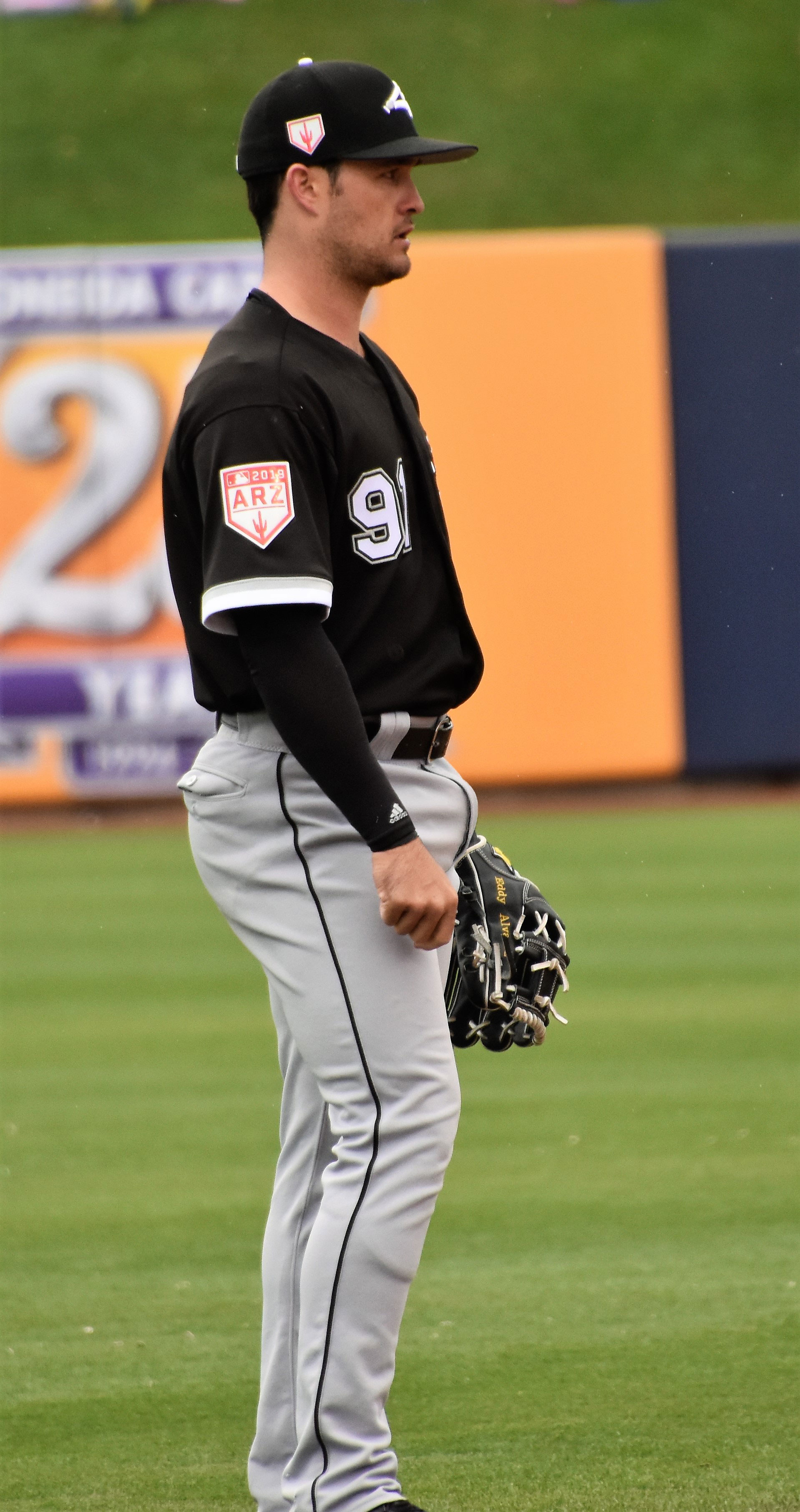
- Alvarez with the Chicago White Sox in 2019 spring training
- Utility player
- Born: January 30, 1990 (age 36); Miami, Florida, U.S.
- Batted: Left Threw: Right

MLB debut
- August 5, 2020, for the Miami Marlins

Last MLB appearance
- September 30, 2024, for the New York Mets

MLB statistics
- Batting average: .170
- Home runs: 1
- Runs batted in: 11
- Stats at Baseball Reference

Teams
- Miami Marlins (2020–2021); Los Angeles Dodgers (2022); New York Mets (2024)

Career highlights and awards
- Tokyo 2020 All-Olympic Baseball Team (2021)
Medals
Men's baseball
Representing the United States
Olympic Games
Silver medal – second place	2020 Tokyo	Team

Eddy Alvarez
Personal information
- Nickname: Eddy the Jet
- Born: January 30, 1990 (age 36) Miami, Florida, U.S.
- Height: 5 ft 9 in (175 cm)
- Weight: 160 lb (73 kg)

Sport
- Country: United States
- Sport: Short track speed skating
- Coached by: Stephen Gough
Medal record
Men's short track speed skating
Representing the United States
Olympic Games
Silver medal – second place	2014 Sochi	5000 m relay

Eduardo Cortes Alvarez (born January 30, 1990) is an American former professional baseball utility player and short track speed skater. He played in Major League Baseball (MLB) for the Miami Marlins, Los Angeles Dodgers, and New York Mets. He represented the United States and medaled at the 2014 Winter Olympics in short track speed skating. He also medaled as a baseball player at the 2020 Summer Olympics. He is the sixth athlete and third American ever to medal in both the Summer and Winter Olympics in different disciplines. After his MLB debut on August 5, 2020, Alvarez became the first Winter Olympics athlete and the first non-baseball Olympian since Jim Thorpe to play in MLB. They are also the only MLB players to win an Olympic medal in a different sport.

The son of Cuban immigrants, Alvarez grew up in Miami, Florida. He took up roller skating at age five, began ice speed skating at age seven, and at eleven he won national age-level titles in inline, long track, and short track speed skating. In high school, Alvarez took a break from skating to concentrate on his other passion—baseball. He played well enough to earn a college scholarship, but instead quit the sport to pursue his Olympic dream.

Alvarez made the 2008 and 2009 World Junior Short Track Speed Skating Championships, winning a gold medal in 2009. After missing the 2010 Olympics, he returned to baseball in an attempt to give his knees a break after years of chronic pain. He became an All-Conference shortstop, but his knees did not improve. In early 2012, Alvarez underwent surgery to repair badly torn patellar tendons that left him completely immobile for four weeks. He returned to the National Team in July, but was too weak to navigate stairs, let alone skate competitively.

After intense physical therapy, Alvarez made the United States' World Cup Team in December 2012. He finished the season as the country's third highest ranked skater. During the 2013–14 World Cup season, Alvarez won three medals. At the 2014 Olympic Trials, he placed second in the 500 meters, second in the 1,500 meters, and third in the 1,000 meters. The performance made him the first Cuban-American male speed skater to make a U.S. Olympic team. At the Olympics, he won a silver medal in the 5,000 meter relay after failing to medal in his three individual events. Prior to the Olympics, Alvarez said he planned to give up speed skating after the Games to concentrate on baseball.

== Early life ==
The son of Cuban immigrants, Eduardo Alvarez was born January 30, 1990, to Mabel and Walter Alvarez. He grew up in Miami, graduating from Christopher Columbus High School.

At age five, Alvarez was given a pair of plastic roller skates. He quickly found he had a talent and passion for the sport, performing tricks such as jumping over boxes for weekend crowds in South Beach. At age seven, his coach, Bob Manning, introduced him to the ice. Taking inspiration from fellow Manning student and Miami resident Jennifer Rodriguez, Alvarez commit himself to one day making the Olympics. At age eleven, "Eddy the Jet", as he was becoming known as, won the triple crown: national age-level titles in inline speed skating, long track speed skating, and short track speed skating.

As a child, Alvarez spent so much time at the Pettit National Ice Center in Milwaukee that his parents bought a home within walking distance.

During high school, Alvarez put his skating career on hold to focus on his other love, baseball. He played well enough to earn a full athletic scholarship to St. Thomas University as a shortstop. However, the idea of competing in the Olympics drew him back to speed skating, so he declined the scholarship. "Basically my senior year I went up to the head coach and I was like, 'listen I've always had this goal, or a dream, and I want to go back to skating.'" he recalled. "So I dropped baseball and went back to skating."

== Skating career ==
Alvarez made the 2008 and 2009 World Junior Short Track Speed Skating Championships, winning a gold medal in the 3,000 meter relay at the 2009 edition. Hampered by a stomach virus, Alvarez placed seventh at the 2010 Olympic Trials and missed the team. After the Trials, he decided to take a break from skating to give his knees a break after years of chronic pain. "It got to a point where I couldn't finish workouts. I would come home and cry", he recalled. "But I would tell myself to push through it because it was the Olympic season and I had nothing to lose."

For the 2011 season, Alvarez walked on to the Salt Lake Community College baseball team. He became the starting shortstop, batted .303, and was named to the All-Conference team for the season. However, his knees did not improve and he finally decided to have them checked out. His doctor found that Alvarez had multiple tears, twelve total, in the patellar tendons of both knees.

Alvarez underwent five plasma injections before resorting to a surgery that could have ended any chance of a skating comeback. He had surgery in March 2012 and was completely immobile the next four weeks. "That was a tough time," he recalled. "My all-time low. I was ready to quit." His father persuaded Alvarez to persevere and, by July, Alvarez was ready to return to the National Team. He returned as the team was falling apart in the aftermath of accusations that head coach Jae Su Chun had mentally and physically abused athletes. Chun was forced out and formed his own skating club, taking half the National Team with him. Alvarez stayed with the official team. "I went back into the national racing program because the only way I could do it was with support", he explained. "I couldn't do it on my own. I had to do what was best for me." Alvarez's muscles were so weak from disuse that he could not even navigate a set of stairs without help. While his teammates worked on their skating skills, he underwent intense physical therapy to rehabilitate his leg muscles.

By December 2012, Alvarez had recovered enough to qualify for the World Cup team. After the 2013 US National Championships in January, he was ranked fourth overall on the US team. He made the World Championships, and moved up to third by the end of the season. During the 2013–14 ISU Short Track Speed Skating World Cup, he won a gold (at Kolomna) and a silver (at Seoul) in the 5,000 meter relay. He also won a bronze (at Shanghai) in the 500 meters.

Alvarez opened the 2014 Winter Olympic Trials by placing second in the 1,500 meters. He followed it up with a second-place finish in the 500 meters, securing a spot on the Olympic team. He became first Cuban-American male speed skater to make a U.S. Olympic team. "This was a dream, a goal of mine since I was a kid. I want to stand on that podium. I want to represent my country and my background, my family, my parents". Alvarez concluded the trials by placing third in the 1,000 meters.

Alvarez opened the Olympics with a disqualification in the 1,500 meters after running into an Italian skater. In the 1,000 meters, he fell when a Canadian skater slipped in front of him. He was taken down by a South Korean in the qualification round of the 5,000 meter relay, but his team advanced when a judge ruled the South Korean had impeded Alvarez. In a 500-meter heat, Alvarez again fell, this time on his own, when he slipped on soft ice. Commenting on all the falls, he joked that he should get a medal for his skill at hitting the protective padding at the edge of the rink. Alvarez finished strong, as he and his teammates won the silver medal in the 5,000 meter relay final, finishing 0.271 seconds behind Russia.

Prior to the Olympics, Alvarez said he would return to baseball after the Games in the hopes of being drafted. He said he is 95% sure he will not return to the ice again.

== Professional baseball career ==
=== Chicago White Sox ===
The Chicago White Sox signed Alvarez to a minor league contract on June 11, 2014. He made his professional debut with the Arizona White Sox of the Rookie-level Arizona League, where he played 27 games. He was promoted to the Kannapolis Intimidators of the Single-A South Atlantic League on August 12.

Alvarez began the 2015 season with Kannapolis. After a successful stint with Kannapolis, Alvarez was promoted to the Winston-Salem Dash of the High-A Carolina League on July 22, 2015. In 2016, he began the season with the Birmingham Barons of the Double-A Southern League, and was promoted to the Charlotte Knights of the Triple-A International League. On the season, he logged a .265/.341/.365 slash line with 6 home runs and 65 RBI. In 2017, Alvarez split the year between Birmingham and Charlotte, posting a .235/.347/.310 batting line with 4 home runs and 39 RBI in 126 games. In 101 games for Charlotte in 2018, Alvarez slashed .253/.348/.435 with a career-high 8 home runs and 37 RBI.

=== Miami Marlins ===
On March 27, 2019, Alvarez was traded to the Miami Marlins. He split the 2019 season between the Triple-A New Orleans Baby Cakes, Double-A Jacksonville Jumbo Shrimp, and High-A Jupiter Hammerheads, accumulating a .324/.408/.559 batting line with a career-high 12 home runs and 44 RBI in 70 games between the three affiliates.

On August 3, 2020, the Marlins selected Alvarez's contract to the 40-man roster and promoted him to the major leagues for the first time. On August 5, he made his MLB debut against the Baltimore Orioles. Alvarez was designated for assignment by the Marlins on September 13, after going 7-for-37 (.189), in 12 games.

Alvarez was assigned to the Triple-A Jacksonville Jumbo Shrimp to begin the 2021 season. He left the minors during the 2021 season to compete in the Olympics. After being called up in September, Alvarez hit his first major league home run on September 11. He hit .188 with one home run and six RBI in 24 appearances for the team during the year. On October 21, Alvarez elected free agency.

=== Los Angeles Dodgers ===
On January 1, 2022, Alvarez signed a minor league contract with the Los Angeles Dodgers. During spring training, he was assigned to the Triple A Oklahoma City Dodgers. He was recalled to the majors on June 3. Alvarez was optioned back to the Triple A Oklahoma City Dodgers on July 3. In 14 games with the Dodgers, he had four hits in 25 at-bats (.160 average) while he hit .322 with eight homers and 29 RBI for Oklahoma City in 47 games. He was designated for assignment on August 30. On September 5, the Dodgers released Alvarez.

=== Milwaukee Brewers ===
On December 3, 2022, the Milwaukee Brewers signed Alvarez to a minor league contract that included an invitation to spring training. Wearing tights and Rollerblades, he skated around the clubhouse when he was introduced during a team meeting. He played in 63 games for the Triple-A Nashville Sounds in 2023, hitting .283/.397/.473 with 7 home runs, 31 RBI, and 16 stolen bases. On July 13, 2023, the Brewers released Alvarez.

=== Boston Red Sox ===
On July 26, 2023, Alvarez signed a minor league contract with the Boston Red Sox organization. After playing in one game for the Triple-A Worcester Red Sox, Alvarez announced that he had suffered a fractured foot that would sideline him for the remainder of the season. Breaking the navicular bone meant he had to have it surgically repaired with a bone graft from his hip. In December 2023, he was named a non-roster invitee to the team's 2024 spring training.

Alvarez began the 2024 campaign with Worcester, playing in 114 games and slashing .247/.348/.463 with 18 home runs, 77 RBI, and 18 stolen bases.

=== New York Mets ===
On September 8, 2024, Alvarez was traded to the New York Mets for cash. The next day, the Mets selected Alvarez's contract, adding him to their active roster following the loss of second baseman Jeff McNeil, who suffered a broken wrist when he was hit by a pitch. On October 1, Alvarez was designated for assignment by the Mets after the promotion of Max Kranick. In 13 games for New York in 2024, Alvarez went 0-for-9 with no RBI. He cleared waivers and was sent outright to Triple-A on October 3. Alvarez elected free agency on October 21.

=== Atlanta Braves ===
On January 6, 2025, Alvarez signed a minor league contract with the Atlanta Braves. On May 20, he joined the Triple-A Gwinnett Stripers, playing in 51 games and hitting .176/.323/.302 with five home runs, 14 RBI, and 10 stolen bases. Alvarez retired from professional baseball on June 29.

== International baseball ==
In May 2021, Alvarez was named to the roster of the United States national baseball team for qualifying for 2020 Summer Olympics. After the team qualified, Alvarez was named to the Olympics roster on July 2. On July 21, Alvarez was chosen to be a flag bearer for the U.S. in the Olympics opening ceremony alongside basketball player Sue Bird. Alvarez was the first baseball player to be selected as a flag bearer for the U.S. The baseball team went on to win silver, losing to host Japan in the gold-medal game. Alvarez became the 135th athlete to compete in both the Winter and Summer Olympics and only the sixth to medal at both the Winter and Summer Olympics. Eddie Eagan and Lauryn Williams are the only other Americans to earn medals at both the Winter and Summer games.

== Personal life ==
Alvarez and his wife, Gaby, have two sons. Their older son is named Jett.

Alvarez's older brother, Nick, played professional baseball for seven years in the Dodgers system, reaching Triple-A in 2006. His sister, Nicole, is a radio DJ in Los Angeles.

Alvarez views fellow short track speed skater J.R. Celski as being like another brother. He says training with Celski, whom he has known since age six, has been the biggest factor in his success as a speed skater. "In California we'd be going up the sand dunes and he'd see me coming closer and he would just hit the jets," he recalls. "We're competitive. Everything we do is a competition."

After one surgery, Alvarez learned to play guitar to keep himself occupied.

== See also ==
- List of athletes with Olympic medals in different sports
- List of multi-sport athletes
- List of Olympic medalists in baseball
- List of Olympic medalists in short track speed skating
- List of people from Miami

Olympic Games
Preceded by Erin Hamlin	Flagbearer for United States (with Sue Bird); Tokyo 2020	Succeeded by LeBron James; Coco Gauff; París 2024
