= Kazakhstan at the 2018 Winter Olympics =

- Flag of Kazakhstan
- IOC code: KAZ
- NOC: National Olympic Committee of the Republic of Kazakhstan
- Website: www.olympic.kz (in Kazakh, Russian, and English)

in PyeongChang, South Korea 9–25 February 2018
- Competitors: 46 in 9 sports
- Flag bearer: Abzal Azhgaliyev (opening)
- Medals Ranked 28th: Gold 0 Silver 0 Bronze 1 Total 1

Winter Olympics appearances (overview)
- 1994; 1998; 2002; 2006; 2010; 2014; 2018; 2022; 2026; 2030

Other related appearances
- Soviet Union (1956–1988); Unified Team (1992)

Kazakhstan competed at the 2018 Winter Olympics in PyeongChang, South Korea, from 9 to 25 February 2018.

On January 9, 2018, short track speed skater Abzal Azhgaliyev was named as the country's flag bearer during the opening ceremony.

== Medalists ==
Medal	Name	Sport	Event	Date
Bronze	Yuliya Galysheva	Freestyle skiing	Women's moguls	11 February

== Competitors ==
The following is the list of number of competitors participating at the Games per sport/discipline.

Sport	Men	Women	Total
Alpine skiing	1	1	2
Biathlon	5	5	10
Cross-country skiing	4	3	7
Figure skating	1	2	3
Freestyle skiing	3	6	9
Luge	1	0	1
Short track speed skating	5	2	7
Ski jumping	1	0	1
Speed skating	5	1	6
Total	26	20	46

== Alpine skiing ==
Kazakhstan qualified one male and one female athlete.

Athlete	Event	Run 1		Run 2		Total	
Athlete	Event	Time	Rank	Time	Rank	Time	Rank
Igor Zakurdayev	Men's downhill	—				1:45.01	39
Igor Zakurdayev	Men's super-G	—				1:29.96	41
Igor Zakurdayev	Men's combined	1:22.29	42	53.18	32	2:15.47	31
Igor Zakurdayev	Men's giant slalom	1:18.78	62	1:16.29	46	2:35.07	51
Igor Zakurdayev	Men's slalom	DNF					
Mariya Grigorova	Women's giant slalom	1:22.42	57	1:18.77	51	2:41.19	51
Mariya Grigorova	Women's slalom	1:02.49	54	1:01.88	51	2:04.37	51

== Biathlon ==
Based on their Nations Cup rankings in the 2016–17 Biathlon World Cup, Kazakhstan qualified a team of 5 men and 5 women.

Men

Athlete	Event	Time	Misses	Rank
Maxim Braun	Sprint	27:46.7	4 (3+1)	85
Maxim Braun	Individual	53:50.7	2 (0+1+0+1)	61
Timur Khamitgatin	Individual	54:52.7	2 (0+2+0+0)	72
Vassiliy Podkorytov	Sprint	26:34.7	1 (1+0)	80
Vassiliy Podkorytov	Individual	53:52.5	2 (1+0+1+0)	62
Vladislav Vitenko	Sprint	26:32.7	4 (2+2)	79
Vladislav Vitenko	Individual	57:11.3	7 (2+2+1+2)	83
Roman Yeremin	Sprint	25:21.9	2 (1+1)	43
Roman Yeremin	Pursuit	38:51.1	8 (2+1+2+3)	52
Maxim Braun; Vassiliy Podkorytov; Vladislav Vitenko; Roman Yeremin	Team relay	LAP	12 (5+7)	17

Women

Athlete	Event	Time	Misses	Rank
Darya Klimina	Sprint	23:47.7	3 (2+1)	58
Darya Klimina	Pursuit	38:00.0	8 (1+1+3+3)	57
Darya Klimina	Individual	46:44.4	3 (2+0+1+0)	51
Olga Poltoranina	Sprint	23:59.6	2 (0+2)	63
Olga Poltoranina	Individual	46:36.5	2 (0+0+1+1)	46
Alina Raikova	Sprint	24:33.8	3 (0+3)	71
Alina Raikova	Individual	46:37.4	3 (0+1+0+2)	47
Galina Vishnevskaya	Sprint	22:52.2	2 (2+0)	30
Galina Vishnevskaya	Pursuit	33:05.9	1 (0+0+1+0)	20
Galina Vishnevskaya	Individual	46:23.4	3 (0+2+1+0)	45
Darya Klimina; Olga Poltoranina; Alina Raikova; Galina Vishnevskaya	Team relay	1:14:18.0	10 (2+8)	14

Mixed

Athlete	Event	Time	Misses	Rank
Maxim Braun; Roman Yeremin; Alina Raikova; Galina Vishnevskaya	Team relay	1:14:13.7	10 (7+3)	18

== Cross-country skiing ==
Kazakhstan qualified a total of 6 male and female athletes for cross-country skiing and received one additional quota place based on the reallocation process. Four male and three female competitors were announced on January 29.

Distance
Men

Athlete	Event	Classical		Freestyle		Final		
Athlete	Event	Time	Rank	Time	Rank	Time	Deficit	Rank
Alexey Poltoranin	50 km classical	—				2:13:37.1	+5:15.0	15
Vitaliy Pukhalo	15 km freestyle	—				36:57.4	+3:13.5	54
Vitaliy Pukhalo	30 km skiathlon	42:27.0	40	36:45.9	30	1:19:46.7	+3:26.7	34
Vitaliy Pukhalo	50 km classical	—				2:27:10.6	+18:48.5	52
Yevgeniy Velichko	15 km freestyle	—				37:28.6	+3:44.7	61
Yevgeniy Velichko	30 km skiathlon	41:47.4	33	38:44.4	51	1:21:03.9	+4:43.9	43
Yevgeniy Velichko	50 km classical	—				2:21:43.2	+13:21.1	39
Denis Volotka	15 km freestyle	—				37:39.8	+3:55.9	64
Denis Volotka	50 km classical	—				DNS		
Alexey Poltoranin; Vitaliy Pukhalo; Yevgeniy Velichko; Denis Volotka	4×10 km relay	—				1:36:36.3	+3:31.4	8

Women

Athlete	Event	Classical		Freestyle		Final		
Athlete	Event	Time	Rank	Time	Rank	Time	Deficit	Rank
Yelena Kolomina	10 km freestyle	—				29:13.0	+4:12.5	63
Yelena Kolomina	15 km skiathlon	24:12.1	56	21:38.6	54	46:28.5	+5:43.6	54
Yelena Kolomina	30 km classical	—				1:35:38.4	+13:20.8	33
Anna Shevchenko	10 km freestyle	—				28:56.9	+3:56.4	56
Anna Shevchenko	15 km skiathlon	22:52.3	32	20:59.9	39	44:25.1	+3:40.2	36
Anna Shevchenko	30 km classical	—				1:35:36.1	+13:18.5	31
Valeriya Tyuleneva	10 km freestyle	—				28:20.7	+3:20.2	47
Valeriya Tyuleneva	15 km skiathlon	23.41.6	47	DNF				
Valeriya Tyuleneva	30 km classical	—				1:35:38.0	+13:20.4	32

Sprint

Athlete	Event	Qualification		Quarterfinal		Semifinal		Final	
Athlete	Event	Time	Rank	Time	Rank	Time	Rank	Time	Rank
Alexey Poltoranin	Men's sprint	3:14.43	13 Q	3:12.60	4	did not advance			
Denis Volotka	Men's sprint	3:22.52	51	did not advance					
Alexey Poltoranin; Denis Volotka	Men's team sprint	—				16:30.10	8	did not advance	
Yelena Kolomina	Women's sprint	3:39.22	55	did not advance					
Anna Shevchenko	Women's sprint	3:23.27	27 Q	3:23.56	6	did not advance			
Anna Shevchenko; Valeriya Tyuleneva	Women's team sprint	—				17:57.04	10	did not advance	

== Figure skating ==
Kazakhstan qualified one male and two female figure skaters, based on its placement at the 2017 World Figure Skating Championships in Helsinki, Finland.

Athlete	Event	SP		FS		Total	
Athlete	Event	Points	Rank	Points	Rank	Points	Rank
Denis Ten	Men's singles	70.12	27	did not advance			
Aiza Mambekova	Ladies' singles	44.40	30	did not advance			
Elizabet Tursynbayeva	Ladies' singles	57.95	15 Q	118.30	13	177.12	12

== Freestyle skiing ==
Aerials

Athlete	Event	Qualification				Final					
Athlete	Event	Jump 1		Jump 2		Jump 1		Jump 2		Jump 3	
Athlete	Event	Points	Rank	Points	Rank	Points	Rank	Points	Rank	Points	Rank
Ildar Badrutdinov	Men's aerials	89.18	19	94.47	15	did not advance					
Marzhan Akzhigit	Women's aerials	79.17	14	70.20	12	did not advance					
Zhanbota Aldabergenova	Women's aerials	81.07	12	85.36	7	did not advance					
Akhmarzhan Kalmurzayeva	Women's aerials	58.58	21	47.32	16	did not advance					
Ayana Zholdas	Women's aerials	51.01	23	57.98	18	did not advance					

Moguls

Athlete	Event	Qualification								Final											
Athlete	Event	Run 1				Run 2				Run 1				Run 2				Run 3			
Athlete	Event	Time	Points	Total	Rank	Time	Points	Total	Rank	Time	Points	Total	Rank	Time	Points	Total	Rank	Time	Points	Total	Rank
Pavel Kolmakov	Men's moguls	13.74	66.24	79.98	7 Q	Bye				25.88	64.35	78.22	11 Q	25.39	61.58	76.10	7	did not advance			
Dmitriy Reiherd	Men's moguls	25.08	66.30	81.23	3 Q	Bye				24.70	64.34	79.77	6 Q	23.85	42.09	58.64	8	did not advance			
Ayaulum Amrenova	Women's moguls	35.15	44.39	52.78	26	35.25	30.40	38.68	17	Did not advance											
Yuliya Galysheva	Women's moguls	30.51	62.74	76.36	7 Q	Bye				30.62	61.61	75.10	7 Q	30.65	63.35	76.81	6 Q	30.14	63.37	77.40	3rd place, bronze medalist(s)

== Luge ==
Athlete	Event	Run 1		Run 2		Run 3		Run 4		Total	
Athlete	Event	Time	Rank	Time	Rank	Time	Rank	Time	Rank	Time	Rank
Nikita Kopyrenko	Men's singles	50.147	35	50.327	38	49.244	34	Eliminated		2:29.718	36

== Short track speed skating ==
According to the ISU Special Olympic Qualification Rankings, Kazakhstan qualified 3 men and 2 women. During reallocation process got 2 additional quotas: 1 quota for 1500 meters men's event and 1 quota for men's relay.

Men

Athlete	Event	Heat		Quarterfinal		Semifinal		Final	
Athlete	Event	Time	Rank	Time	Rank	Time	Rank	Time	Rank
Abzal Azhgaliyev	500 m	43.388	3 ADV	41.616	4 ADV	40.835	5	did not advance	
Denis Nikisha	500 m	41.436	3 ADV	40.806	3	did not advance			
Denis Nikisha	1500 m	2:14.847	4	—		did not advance			
Nurbergen Zhumagaziyev	500 m	40.748	3 ADV	DNF		did not advance			
Nurbergen Zhumagaziyev	1000 m	1:24.271	4	did not advance					
Nurbergen Zhumagaziyev	1500 m	DNF		—		did not advance			
Abzal Azhgaliyev; Denis Nikisha; Yerkebulan Shamukhanov; Mersaid Zhaxybayev; Nurbergen Zhumagaziyev	5000 m relay	—				6:47.727	3 FB	6:52.791	6

Women

Athlete	Event	Heat		Quarterfinal		Semifinal		Final	
Athlete	Event	Time	Rank	Time	Rank	Time	Rank	Time	Rank
Kim Iong-a	1000 m	1:29.703	3	did not advance					
Kim Iong-a	1500 m	2:29.875	4	—		did not advance			
Anastassiya Krestova	500 m	43.821	4	did not advance					
Anastassiya Krestova	1000 m	1:31.557	3	did not advance					
Anastassiya Krestova	1500 m	PEN		—		did not advance			

== Ski jumping ==
Kazakhstan qualified one ski jumper.

Athlete	Event	Qualification			First round			Final			Total	
Athlete	Event	Distance	Points	Rank	Distance	Points	Rank	Distance	Points	Rank	Points	Rank
Sergey Tkachenko	Men's normal hill	84.0	83.7	51	did not advance							
Sergey Tkachenko	Men's large hill	111.0	70.9	47 Q	107.5	73.5	49	did not advance				

== Speed skating ==
Individual

Athlete	Event	Race	
Athlete	Event	Time	Rank
Artyom Krikunov	Men's 500 m	35.34	25
Roman Krech	Men's 500 m	35.92	35
Denis Kuzin	Men's 1000 m	1:10.13	27
Denis Kuzin	Men's 1500 m	1:49.14	30
Fyodor Mezentsev	Men's 1000 m	1:10.62	33
Fyodor Mezentsev	Men's 1500 m	1:48.23	28
Stanislav Palkin	Men's 500 m	35.33	24
Stanislav Palkin	Men's 1000 m	1:10.149	29
Yekaterina Aydova	Women's 500 m	38.96	21
Yekaterina Aydova	Women's 1000 m	1:17.09	24
Yekaterina Aydova	Women's 1500 m	1:59.05	18

Mass start

Athlete	Event	Semifinal			Final		
Athlete	Event	Points	Time	Rank	Points	Time	Rank
Fyodor Mezentsev	Men's mass start	0	8:43.26	11	did not advance		

== See also ==
- Kazakhstan at the 2017 Asian Winter Games
- Kazakhstan at the 2017 Winter Universiade
