= Latvia at the 2018 Winter Olympics =

- Flag of Latvia
- IOC code: LAT
- NOC: Latvian Olympic Committee
- Website: www.olimpiade.lv (in Latvian)

in Pyeongchang, South Korea 9–25 February 2018
- Competitors: 34 (25 men and 9 women) in 9 sports
- Flag bearer: Daumants Dreiškens
- Medals Ranked 28th: Gold 0 Silver 0 Bronze 1 Total 1

Winter Olympics appearances (overview)
- 1924; 1928; 1932; 1936; 1948–1988; 1992; 1994; 1998; 2002; 2006; 2010; 2014; 2018; 2022; 2026

Other related appearances
- Soviet Union (1956–1988)

Latvia competed at the 2018 Winter Olympics in Pyeongchang, South Korea, from 9 to 25 February 2018, with 34 competitors in 9 sports. They won one bronze medal in two-man bobsleigh and ranked 28th in the medal table.

== Medalists ==
Medals by sport
Sport	1st place, gold medalist(s)	2nd place, silver medalist(s)	3rd place, bronze medalist(s)	Total
Bobsleigh	0	0	1	1
Total	0	0	1	1

Medal	Name	Sport	Event	Date
Bronze	Jānis Strenga; Oskars Melbārdis	Bobsleigh	Two-man	19 February

== Competitors ==
The following is the list of number of competitors participating at the Games per sport/discipline.

Sport	Men	Women	Total
Alpine skiing	1	1	2
Biathlon	2	1	3
Bobsleigh	8	0	8
Cross-country skiing	1	2	3
Figure skating	1	1	2
Luge	7	3	10
Short track speed skating	2	0	2
Skeleton	2	1	3
Speed skating	1	0	1
Total	25	9	34

== Alpine skiing ==
Athlete	Event	Run 1		Run 2		Total	
Athlete	Event	Time	Rank	Time	Rank	Time	Rank
Kristaps Zvejnieks	Men's combined	1:23.02	51	48.74	14	2:11.76	26
Kristaps Zvejnieks	Men's giant slalom	1:13.81	41	1:14.46	38	2:28.27	35
Lelde Gasūna	Women's giant slalom	1:18.65	47	1:15.30	42	2:33.95	43
Lelde Gasūna	Women's slalom	54.50	39	54.81	37	1:49.31	37

== Biathlon ==
Based on their Nations Cup ranking in the 2016–17 Biathlon World Cup, Latvia has qualified 2 men, and 1 woman.

Athlete	Event	Time	Misses	Rank
Andrejs Rastorgujevs	Men's sprint	24:34.4	3 (1+2)	24
Andrejs Rastorgujevs	Men's pursuit	34:29.3	4 (1+0+1+2)	12
Andrejs Rastorgujevs	Men's individual	53:41.8	6 (1+1+3+1)	59
Andrejs Rastorgujevs	Men's mass start	38:47.4	3 (0+1+0+2)	28
Oskars Muižnieks	Men's sprint	25:56.3	2 (1+1)	66
Oskars Muižnieks	Men's individual	52:06.0	3 (0+2+0+1)	42
Baiba Bendika	Women's sprint	23:14.6	4 (3+1)	39
Baiba Bendika	Women's pursuit	33:59.4	3 (1+0+2+0)	33
Baiba Bendika	Women's individual	45:32.8	4 (0+1+1+2)	39

== Bobsleigh ==
Based on their rankings in the 2017–18 Bobsleigh World Cup, Latvia has qualified 4 sleds.

Athlete	Event	Run 1		Run 2		Run 3		Run 4		Total	
Athlete	Event	Time	Rank	Time	Rank	Time	Rank	Time	Rank	Time	Rank
Jānis Strenga; Oskars Melbārdis*	Two-man	49.08 TR	1	49.54	10	49.08	2	49.21	1	3:16.91	3rd place, bronze medalist(s)
Oskars Ķibermanis*; Matīss Miknis	Two-man	49.21	4	49.57	12	49.32	6	49.70	14	3:17.80	9
Daumants Dreiškens; Oskars Melbārdis*; Jānis Strenga; Arvis Vilkaste	Four-man	48.82	4	49.39	12	48.91	5	49.53	2	3:16.65	5
Jānis Jansons; Oskars Ķibermanis*; Helvijs Lūsis; Matīss Miknis	Four-man	49.18	15	49.26	=7	49.34	11	49.63	9	3:17.41	10

- Intars Dambis (reserve man)

* – Denotes the driver of each sled

== Cross-country skiing ==
Distance

Athlete	Event	Final		
Athlete	Event	Time	Deficit	Rank
Indulis Bikše	Men's 15 km freestyle	37:44.7	+4:00.8	65
Indulis Bikše	Men's 50 km classical	2:31:07.5	+22:45.4	57
Patrīcija Eiduka	Women's 10 km freestyle	28:13.6	+3:13.1	44
Inga Paškovska	Women's 10 km freestyle	31:34.9	+6:34.4	80

Sprint

Athlete	Event	Qualification		Quarterfinals		Semifinals		Final	
Athlete	Event	Time	Rank	Time	Rank	Time	Rank	Time	Rank
Indulis Bikše	Men's sprint	3:30.53	63	did not advance					
Patrīcija Eiduka	Women's sprint	3:49.70	62	did not advance					

== Figure skating ==
Latvia has qualified one male and female figure skater, based on its placement at the 2017 World Figure Skating Championships in Helsinki, Finland.

Individual

Athlete	Event	SP		FS		Total	
Athlete	Event	Points	Rank	Points	Rank	Points	Rank
Deniss Vasiļjevs	Men's singles	79.52	21 Q	155.06	20	234.58	19
Diāna Ņikitina	Ladies' singles	51.12	26	did not advance			

== Luge ==
Based on the results from the World Cups during the 2017–18 Luge World Cup season, Latvia qualified 8 sleds.

Men

Athlete	Event	Run 1		Run 2		Run 3		Run 4		Total	
Athlete	Event	Time	Rank	Time	Rank	Time	Rank	Time	Rank	Time	Rank
Kristers Aparjods	Singles	47.822	6	47.834	6	47.858	13	47.942	17	3:11.456	11
Artūrs Dārznieks	Singles	48.305	21	48.671	29	48.602	28	Eliminated		2:25.578	24
Inārs Kivlenieks	Singles	48.274	20	48.370	22	48.066	20	48.112	20	3:12.822	20
Oskars Gudramovičs; Pēteris Kalniņš	Doubles	46.890	17	46.317	9	—N/a				1:33.207	14
Andris Šics; Juris Šics	Doubles	46.336	9	46.106	4	—N/a				1:32.442	6

Women

Athlete	Event	Run 1		Run 2		Run 3		Run 4		Total	
Athlete	Event	Time	Rank	Time	Rank	Time	Rank	Time	Rank	Time	Rank
Kendija Aparjode	Singles	48.103	27	46.927	21	47.296	21	Eliminated		2:22.326	22
Elīza Cauce	Singles	47.458	25	46.477	10	46.624	10	47.092	16	3:07.651	16
Ulla Zirne	Singles	46.471	9	46.409	7	47.327	22	46.895	14	3:07.102	12

Mixed team relay

Athlete	Event	Run 1		Run 2		Run 3		Total	
Athlete	Event	Time	Rank	Time	Rank	Time	Rank	Time	Rank
Kristers Aparjods; Andris Šics; Juris Šics; Ulla Zirne	Team relay	47.369	8	48.891	7	49.055	3	2:25.315	6

== Short track speed skating ==
Latvia has qualified two skaters for men's events for the Olympics during the four World Cup events in November 2017.

Athlete	Event	Heat		Quarterfinal		Semifinal		Final	
Athlete	Event	Time	Rank	Time	Rank	Time	Rank	Time	Rank
Roberto Puķītis	Men's 1000 m	1:31.635	2 Q	1:24.022	3	did not advance			11
Roberto Puķītis	Men's 1500 m	2:18.825	2 Q	—N/a		2:11.165	4 FB	2:26.525	11
Roberts Zvejnieks	Men's 500 m	40.563	2 Q	40.904	3	did not advance			10
Roberts Zvejnieks	Men's 1000 m	1:26.408	3 ADV	1:24.306	4	did not advance			15

Qualification legend: ADV – Advanced due to being impeded by another skater; FA – Qualify to medal round; FB – Qualify to consolation round; AA – Advance to medal round due to being impeded by another skater

== Skeleton ==
Based on the world rankings, Latvia qualified 3 sleds. Martins Dukurs, the sports' most decorated athlete, had previously meddled in Vancouver and Sochi. He was a favorite to win a medal in pyeongchang but fell short. Originally both Martins and Tomass had announced plans to retire following the 2018 Olympics, but after failing to secure a medal in pyeongchang reversed their decision.

Athlete	Event	Run 1		Run 2		Run 3		Run 4		Total	
Athlete	Event	Time	Rank	Time	Rank	Time	Rank	Time	Rank	Time	Rank
Martins Dukurs	Men's	50.85	5	50.38	2	50.32	2	50.76	5	3:22.31	4
Tomass Dukurs	Men's	50.88	7	50.58	5	50.65	6	50.63	4	3:22.74	5
Lelde Priedulēna	Women's	52.14	7	52.17	5	52.09	9	52.09	8	3:28.49	7

== Speed skating ==
Individual

Athlete	Event	Race	
Athlete	Event	Time	Rank
Haralds Silovs	Men's 1000 m	1:09.50	15
Haralds Silovs	Men's 1500 m	1:45.25	4

Mass start

Athlete	Event	Semifinal			Final		
Athlete	Event	Points	Time	Rank	Points	Time	Rank
Haralds Silovs	Men's mass start	3	8:28.93	9	did not advance		
