= 2019 European Short Track Speed Skating Championships =

- Location: Dordrecht, Netherlands
- Venue: Sportboulevard Dordrecht
- Dates: 11–13 January
- Competitors: 125 from 24 nations

The 2019 European Short Track Speed Skating Championships took place, for the fourth time, from 11 to 13 January 2019 in Dordrecht, Netherlands.

== Medal summary ==
=== Medal table ===
* Host nation (Netherlands)

Rank	Nation	Gold	Silver	Bronze	Total
1	Hungary (HUN)	4	4	1	9
2	Netherlands (NED)*	3	1	1	5
3	Russia (RUS)	2	2	6	10
4	Poland (POL)	1	0	0	1
5	Great Britain (GBR)	0	1	2	3
6	France (FRA)	0	1	0	1
6	Italy (ITA)	0	1	0	1
Totals (7 entries)		10	10	10	30

== Men's events ==
The results of the Championships:

Event	Gold		Silver		Bronze	
500 metres	Shaoang Liu; Hungary	41.120	Shaolin Sándor Liu; Hungary	41.202	Pavel Sitnikov; Russia	41.338
1000 metres	Semion Elistratov; Russia	1:24.624	Shaolin Sándor Liu; Hungary	1:24.702	Denis Ayrapetyan; Russia	1:24.816
1500 metres	Shaolin Sándor Liu; Hungary	2:13.579	Shaoang Liu; Hungary	2:13.665	Semion Elistratov; Russia	2:13.740
5000 metre relay	Hungary; Csaba Burján; Cole Krueger; Shaoang Liu; Sándor Liu Shaolin; Alex Varnyú	6:54.168	Netherlands; Daan Breeuwsma; Jasper Brunsmann; Itzhak de Laat; Dennis Visser	6:54.249	Russia; Denis Ayrapetyan; Semion Elistratov; Alexander Shulginov; Pavel Sitnikov; Konstantin Ivliev	6:59.609
Overall Classification	Shaolin Sándor Liu Hungary	84 pts	Shaoang Liu Hungary	71 pts	Semion Elistratov Russia	55 pts

== Women's events ==
The results of the Championships:

Event	Gold		Silver		Bronze	
500 metres	Natalia Maliszewska; Poland	42.842	Martina Valcepina; Italy	43.241	Lara van Ruijven; Netherlands	43.507
1000 metres	Sofia Prosvirnova; Russia	1:29.045	Tifany Huot-Marchand; France	1:29.101	Elise Christie; Great Britain	1:29.247
1500 metres	Suzanne Schulting; Netherlands	2:29.181	Elise Christie; Great Britain	2:29.416	Sofia Prosvirnova; Russia	2:29.706
3000 metre relay	Netherlands; Rianne de Vries; Suzanne Schulting; Yara van Kerkhof; Lara van Ruijven; Tineke den Dulk	4:09.396	Russia; Ekaterina Efremenkova; Ekaterina Konstantinova; Emina Malagich; Sofia Prosvirnova; Evgeniya Zakharova	4:10.446	Hungary; Sára Luca Bácskai; Petra Jászapáti; Marta Knoch; Barbara Somogyi	4:14.412
Overall Classification	Suzanne Schulting Netherlands	76 pts	Sofia Prosvirnova Russia	57 pts	Elise Christie Great Britain	47 pts

== Participating nations ==
- Austria (2)
- Belgium (6)
- Bosnia and Herzegovina (1)
- Belarus (8)
- Bulgaria (3)
- Croatia (6)
- Czech Republic (6)
- France (9)
- Great Britain (7)
- Germany (6)
- Hungary (9)
- Ireland (2)
- Israel (1)
- Italy (9)
- Latvia (4)
- Luxembourg (1)
- Netherlands (10)
- Poland (9)
- Russia (10)
- Slovenia (1)
- Serbia (1)
- Slovakia (2)
- Turkey (4)
- Ukraine (8)

== See also ==
- Short track speed skating
- European Short Track Speed Skating Championships
