= 2018 European Short Track Speed Skating Championships =

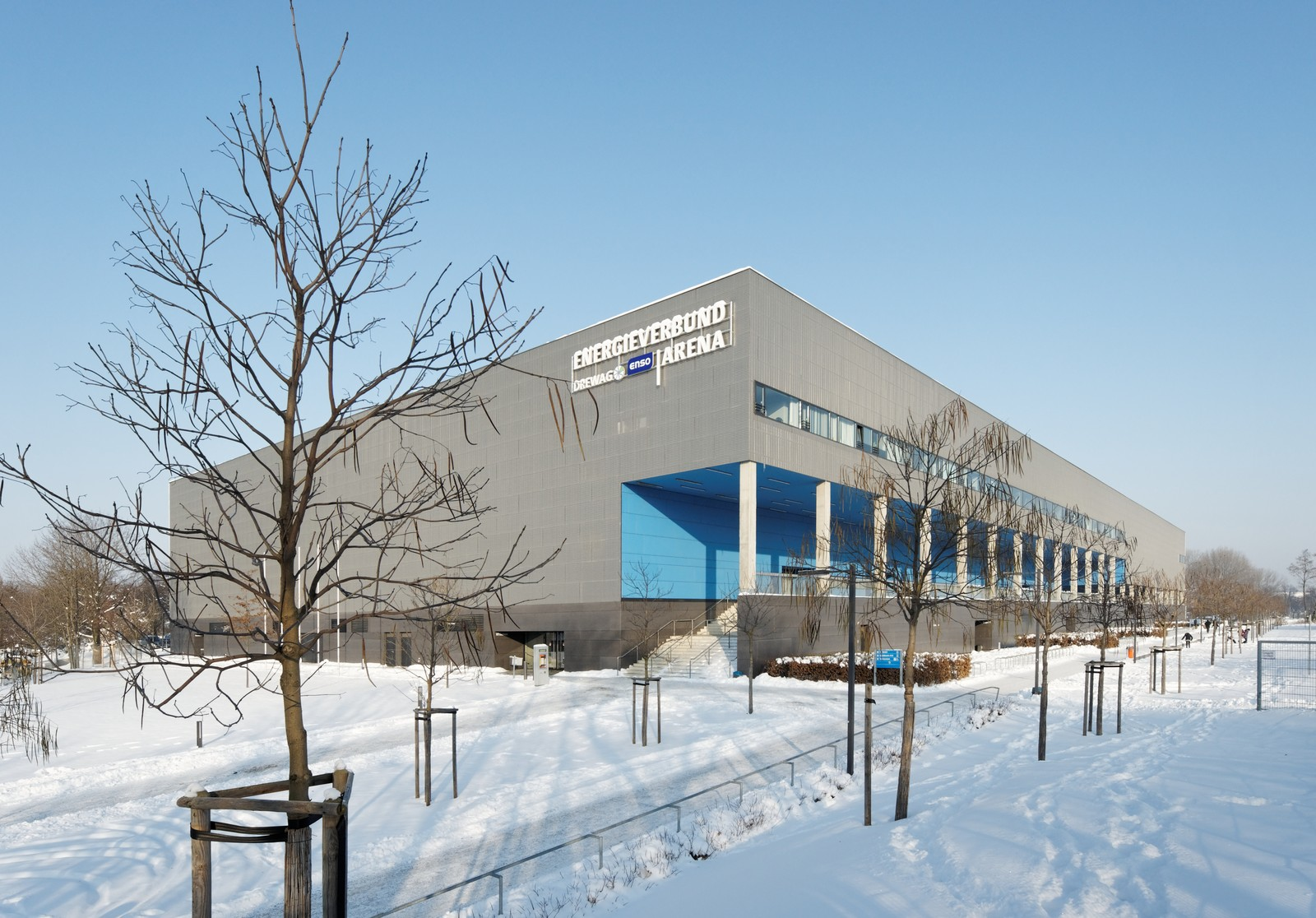
- Venue: EnergieVerbund Arena, Dresden, Germany
- Dates: 12–14 January
- Competitors: 134 from 26 nations

The 2018 European Short Track Speed Skating Championships took place, for the third time, from 12 to 14 January 2018 in Dresden, Germany.

== Medal summary ==
=== Medal table ===
* Host nation (Germany)

Rank	Nation	Gold	Silver	Bronze	Total
1	Netherlands (NED)	5	2	0	7
2	Italy (ITA)	4	2	0	6
3	Russia (RUS)	1	4	3	8
4	Hungary (HUN)	0	1	2	3
5	Israel (ISR)	0	1	1	2
6	France (FRA)	0	0	2	2
7	Germany (GER)*	0	0	1	1
7	Latvia (LAT)	0	0	1	1
Totals (8 entries)		10	10	10	30

=== Men's events ===
The results of the Championships:

Event	Gold		Silver		Bronze	
500 metres	Sjinkie Knegt; Netherlands	41.377	Victor An; Russia	41.441	Sébastien Lepape; France	41.608
1000 metres	Sjinkie Knegt; Netherlands	1:27.898	Semion Elistratov; Russia	1:28.119	Roberto Puķītis; Latvia	1:28.140
1500 metres	Sjinkie Knegt; Netherlands	2:14.886	Semion Elistratov; Russia	2:14.942	Vladislav Bykanov; Israel	2:15.432
5000 metre relay	Netherlands; Daan Breeuwsma; Sjinkie Knegt; Itzhak de Laat; Dennis Visser; Dylan Hoogerwerf	6:36.198	Russia; Semion Elistratov; Denis Ayrapetyan; Victor An; Alexander Shulginov; Pavel Sitnikov	6:36.273	Hungary; Viktor Knoch; Csaba Burján; Sándor Liu Shaolin; Shaoang Liu; Cole Krueger	6:36.348
Overall Classification	Sjinkie Knegt Netherlands	107 pts.	Vladislav Bykanov Israel	52 pts.	Semion Elistratov Russia	43 pts.

=== Women's events ===
The results of the Championships:

Event	Gold		Silver		Bronze	
500 metres	Martina Valcepina; Italy	42.805	Arianna Fontana; Italy	42.852	Sofia Prosvirnova; Russia	43.141
1000 metres	Arianna Fontana; Italy	1:31.921	Suzanne Schulting; Netherlands	1:31.942	Anna Seidel; Germany	1:32.417
1500 metres	Martina Valcepina; Italy	2:36.889	Yara van Kerkhof; Netherlands	2:37.373	Sára Luca Bácskai; Hungary	2:37.689
3000 metre relay	Russia; Tatiana Borodulina; Emina Malagich; Sofia Prosvirnova; Ekaterina Efremenkova; Ekaterina Konstantinova	4:11.462	Hungary; Bernadett Heidum; Andrea Keszler; Zsófia Kónya; Petra Jászapáti; Sára Bácskai	4:11.582	France; Veronique Pierron; Tifany Hout-Marchand; Selma Poutsma; Gwendoline Daudet	4:18.935
Overall Classification	Arianna Fontana Italy	84 pts.	Martina Valcepina Italy	70 pts.	Sofia Prosvirnova Russia	49 pts.

== Participating nations ==
- Austria
- Belarus
- Bosnia & Herzegovina
- Belgium
- Bulgaria
- Croatia
- Czech Republic
- France
- Great Britain
- Germany
- Hungary
- Ireland
- Israel
- Italy
- Latvia
- Lithuania
- Netherlands
- Norway
- Poland
- Romania
- Russia
- Slovenia
- Slovak Republic
- Sweden
- Turkey
- Ukraine

== See also ==
- Short track speed skating
- European Short Track Speed Skating Championships
