= Ryosuke Sakazume =

Japanese short track speed skater (born 1990)

Personal information
- Born: 21 March 1990 (age 36)

Sport
- Country: Japan
- Sport: Short track speed skating
Medal record
World Championships
Bronze medal – third place	2018 Montréal	5000 m Relay
Asian Winter Games
Bronze medal – third place	2017 Sapporo	5000 m relay

Ryosuke Sakazume (坂爪 亮介, Sakazume Ryōsuke; born 21 March 1990) is a Japanese short track speed skater. He competed at the 2014 Winter Olympics in the men's 1000 metres and the men's 1500 metres events. He also competed at the 2018 Winter Olympics in the men's 1000 metres and men's 5000 metre relay.
