= Roberto Puķītis =

Latvian short-track speed skater

Personal information
- Born: 16 December 1994 (age 31) Ventspils, Latvia
- Height: 171 cm (5 ft 7 in)
- Weight: 71 kg (157 lb)

Sport
- Country: Latvia
- Sport: Short track speed skating
Medal record
European Championships
Bronze medal – third place	2018 Dresden	1000 m

Roberto Puķītis (born 16 December 1994, in Ventspils) is a Latvian male short track speed skater. He competed at the 2014 Winter Olympics on 1500 metres and at the 2018 Winter Olympics on 1000 metres and 1500 metres.
