= Jens Almey =

Belgian short track speed skater (born 1996)

Personal information
- Full name: Jens Maurits Almey
- Nationality: Belgian
- Born: 3 July 1996 (age 28); Deinze, Belgium
- Height: 1.89 m (6 ft 2 in)
- Weight: 80 kg (176 lb)

Sport
- Country: Belgium
- Sport: Short track speed skating

Jens Maurits Almey (born 3 July 1996) is a Belgian short track speed skater. He competed in the 2018 Winter Olympics.
