= Vladislav Vitenko =

Kazakhstani biathlete

Personal information
- Nationality: Kazakhstani
- Born: 18 March 1995 (age 31)

Sport
- Sport: Biathlon

Vladislav Vitenko (Владислав Олегович Витенко, born 18 March 1995) is a Kazakhstani biathlete. He competed in the 2018 Winter Olympics.

== Biathlon results ==
All results are sourced from the International Biathlon Union.

=== Olympic Games ===
0 medals

Event	Individual	Sprint	Pursuit	Mass start	Relay	Mixed relay
(South Korea) 2018 Pyeongchang	83rd	79th	—	—	17th	—

=== World Championships ===
0 medals

Event	Individual	Sprint	Pursuit	Mass start	Relay	Mixed relay	Single mixed relay
(Austria) 2017 Hochfilzen	84th	—	—	—	—	—	—
(Sweden) 2019 Östersund	—	—	—	—	—	22nd	—

*During Olympic seasons competitions are only held for those events not included in the Olympic program.
**The single mixed relay was added as an event in 2019.
