= Vojtěch Loudín =

Czech short track speed skater

Personal information
- Born: 11 November 1990 (age 35) Mladá Boleslav, Czechoslovakia
- Height: 185 cm (6 ft 1 in)
- Weight: 79 kg (174 lb)

Sport
- Country: Czech Republic
- Sport: Short track speed skating

Vojtěch Loudín (born 11 November 1990, in Mladá Boleslav) is a Czech short track speed skater.
