= Maksim Siarheyeu =

Belarusian short track speed skater

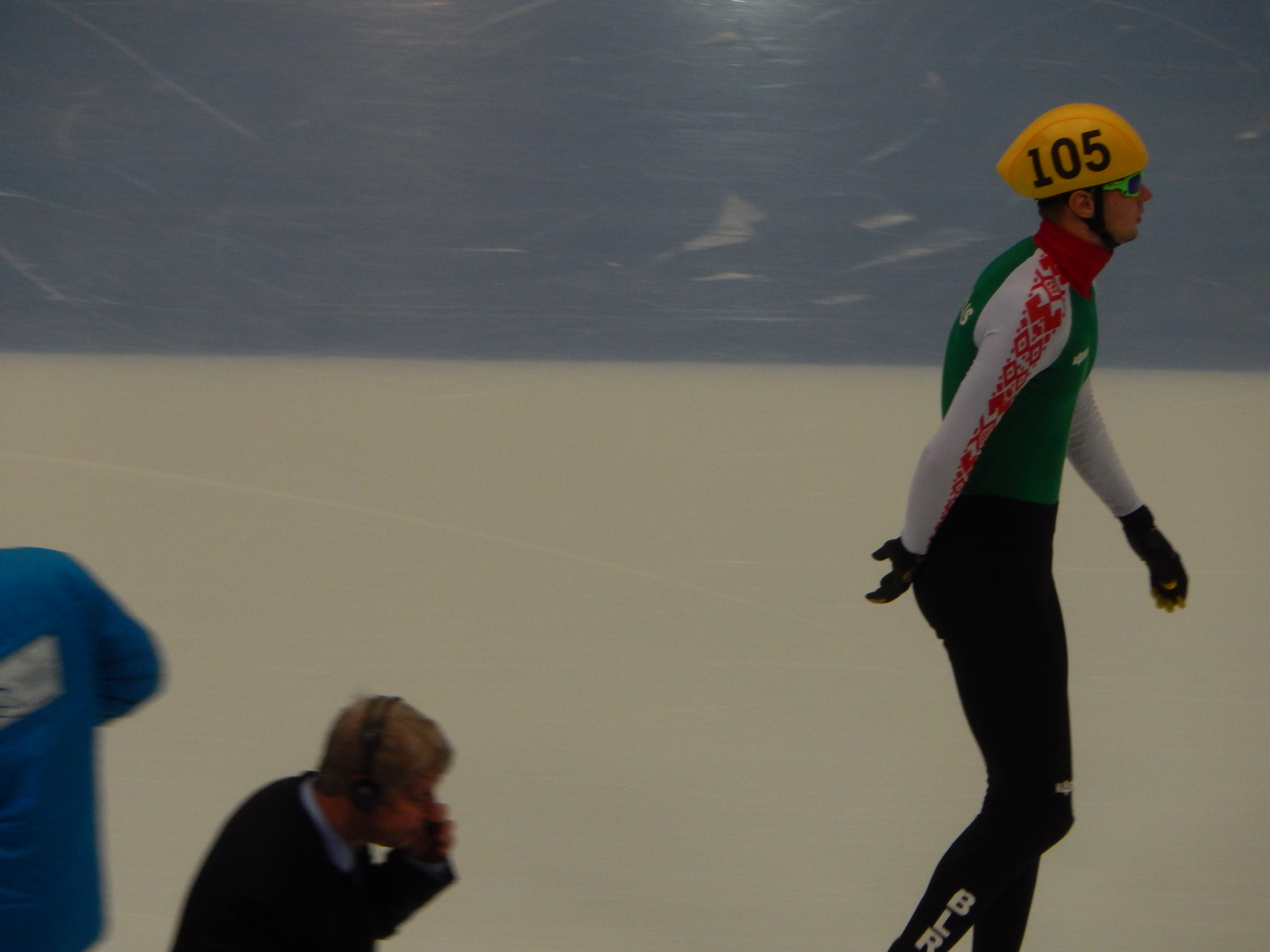
- Siarheyeu in 2015

Personal information
- Born: July 15, 1991 (age 34); Vitebsk, Byelorussian SSR, Soviet Union
- Height: 185 cm (6 ft 1 in)
- Weight: 75 kg (165 lb)

Sport
- Country: Belarus
- Sport: Short track speed skating

Maksim Siarheyeu (born 15 July 1991 in Vitebsk) is a Belarusian male short track speed skater.
