= Aaron Tran =

American short track speed skater (born 1996)

Personal information
- Born: July 24, 1996 (age 30) Federal Way, Washington, U.S.
- Height: 1.70 m (5 ft 7 in)
- Weight: 73 kg (161 lb)

Sport
- Sport: Short track speed skating

Aaron Tran (born July 24, 1996) is an American short track speed skater. He competed in the 2018 Winter Olympics.
