= John-Henry Krueger =

Hungarian-American short-track speed skater

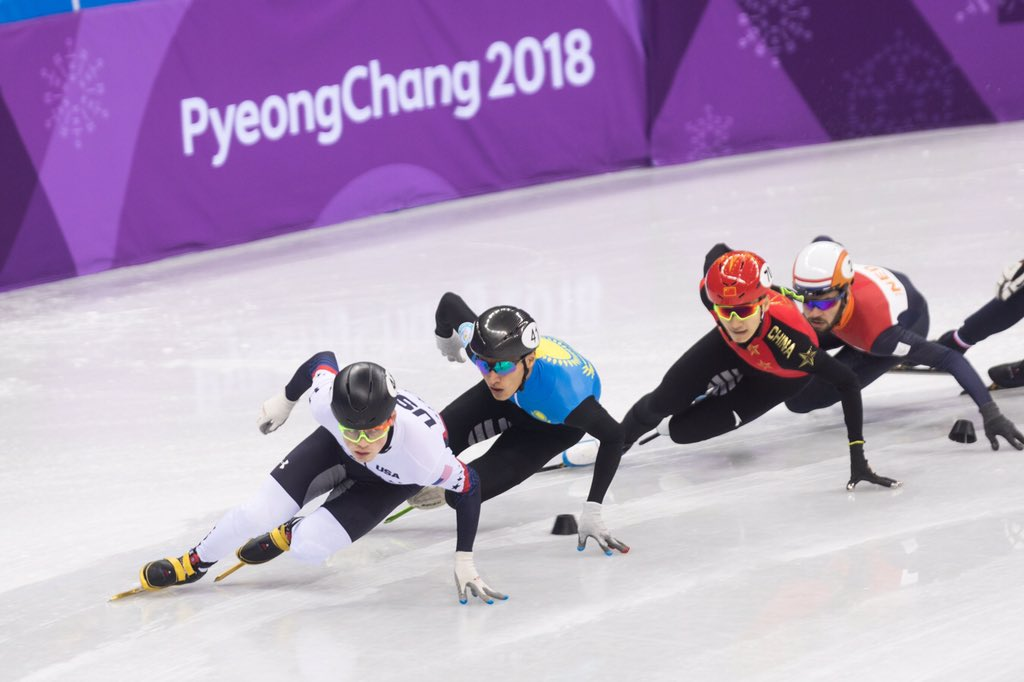
- Krueger (front), skating in 2018

Personal information
- Nicknames: Yuehan; JH
- Nationality: dual American, Hungarian [naturalised]
- Born: March 27, 1995 (age 31) Pittsburgh, Pennsylvania, U.S.
- Home town: Mt. Lebanon, Pennsylvania, U.S.
- Height: 178 cm (5 ft 10 in) [as of February 2018]
- Weight: 75 kg (165 lb) [as of February 2018]
- Parent(s): Heidi Weisenbacher-Krueger; Bryan Krueger

Sport
- Country: Hungary (res. Budapest)
- Sport: Short-track speed skating
- Club: Ferencvárosi Torna Club
- Coached by: Ákos Bánhidi (Hungary); Jae Su Chun (U.S.)

Achievements and titles
- Olympic finals: 2018 Pyeongchang; 2022 Beijing
- Personal bests: 500m: 40.588 (2012); 1000m: 1:23.714 (2017); 1500m: 2:11.501 (2016); 3000m: 4:59.28 (2015)
Medal record
Representing United States
Olympic Games
Silver medal – second place	2018 Pyeongchang	1000 m
Representing Hungary
Olympic Games
Bronze medal – third place	2022 Beijing	2000 m mixed relay
World Championships
Silver medal – second place	2021 Dordrecht	5000 m relay
European Championships
Silver medal – second place	2021 Gdansk	1000 m

John-Henry Krueger (born March 27, 1995) is an American-born, naturalised Hungarian that has represented both countries in his sporting events in short-track speed skating. He was an American national champion in the 500-, 1,000-, and 1,500-meter events. He competed for the U.S. in the 2018 Winter Olympics in Pyeongchang in all men's individual events and in the 5,000-meter team relay event, winning the silver medal in the men's 1,000-meter event. He left U.S. Speedskating after a history of tensions for the stated reason of unmet financial need, switching his allegiance to Hungary in 2018 in time to qualify for Olympic participation in 2022. He earned silver medals for Hungary at the European Championships in Gdansk in the 1,000-meter men's individual event and at the World Championships in Dordrecht in the 5,000-meter relay event (both in 2021). He is competing for Hungary in the 2022 Olympic Games in Beijing, where as of February 11, he had earned a bronze medal in the 2000-meter mixed relay.

== Early life and education ==
John-Henry Krueger was born in Pittsburgh, Pennsylvania on March 27, 1995, to Heidi Weisenbacher-Krueger, a competitive figure skating coach, and Bryan Krueger, a corporate accountant. He grew up near Mount Lebanon, a Pittsburgh suburb, graduating from Peters Township High School near where his parents still reside. He began skating at the Mount Lebanon Ice Center, when he was 5 years old. He has an older sibling, a brother Cole, also a competitive skater, and they joined the Pittsburgh Speedskating Club, also when they were very young.

Cole, about three years older than his brother, struggled at a national competition in Milwaukee, Wisconsin (John-Henry being about age 7 at the time), and their mother sought the advice of Olympian Eric Flaim and began commuting with her sons a few times a week to Washington, D.C. for short-track speed skating coaching, in particular, from Korean coach Jimmy Jang. To save money, they either camped or searched for last-minute hotel deals.

== Career ==
=== Junior career ===
Krueger's major achievements as a U.S. junior competitor include a bronze medal at the 2011-2012 World Junior Championships in the 3000-meter relay, after 6th and 7th-place finishes in 2009-2010 and 2010–2011, respectively; his final two junior competitions in this event, in 2012-2013 and 2013–2014, were 4th and 8th-place finishes (other teammates for these races, unknown). His overall junior world standings for the 2010-2014 period were, sequentially for these years, 24th, 4th, 48th, and 30th.

Over these same years (2011–2014), Krueger began competing in adult World Cup events as a junior, with notable placings in the 5000-meter relay, including firsts in 2013–2014 at Kolomna and Shanghai, a second in 2013–2014 at Montreal, and a third in 2012–2013 at Montreal (other teammates for these races, again, unknown). As well, in World Cup individual events, Krueger posted seconds for the 1,500-meter in 2011–2012 at Moscow and in 2013–2014 at Turin, and a third for the 500-meter in 2012–2013 at Calgary. His overall World Cup standings for the 2011-2014 period were, sequentially for these years, 10th, 39th, and 9th for the 1,500-meter; DNP, 28th, and 51st for the 1,000-meter; and 30th, 20th, and 51st for the 500-meter.

=== Adult career ===
Krueger "emerged as the men’s overall [U.S.] national champion" in his events in 2015. By 2017 he was being described as one of the "top short-track speedskaters", and in November 2017, the U.S. team of Keith Carroll Jr., J.R. Celski, Thomas Hong, and Krueger, competing in Shanghai at a World Cup event, set a short track speed skating world record for the 5,000-meter relay of 6:29.052, a full second faster than the previous record of Canada set in 2012 in Calgary. By 2018, he had been a member for short track speed skating of Team USA for the ISU Speed Skating World Cup for two years.

As a member of the U.S. team, Krueger trained at times in Salt Lake City, the base of U.S. Speedskating. In the lead up to the 2018 Winter Olympics in Pyeongchang, Krueger chose to live and train in South Korea, apart from Team USA’s coaches, where he said "the training environment [would] give him the best chance to win a medal for the U.S." In competitions in that period, he won the men's 500-, 1,000-, and 1,500-meter U.S. Olympic Team trial events, medaling with gold and bronze at the 2017-2018 ISU World Cup Speed Skating competitions in the men's 5,000-meter relay event in Shanghai and Seoul, respectively (the gold being the world record run, see above); and fifth and seventh in the 1,000-meter individual event in Shanghai and Dordrecht, respectively. On the advice of coach Jae Su Chun, after a brief return home at Christmastime in 2017, Krueger joined the National Short Track Training Selection program in Heerenveen in the Netherlands, under the leadership of Dutch national coach Jeroen Otter, for the six week run up to the 2018 games (for the experience of "skat[ing] with a Dutch team").

Krueger's performance at the U.S. Olympic trials qualified him for the 500-, 1,000-, and 1,500-meter individual events, and the 5,000-meter team relay event at the 2018 Winter Olympics in Pyeongchang. He went on to compete at Pyeongchang in all four short track events, relay included. He finished 25th in the 500-meter, and as a result of a penalty during the semifinals of the 1,500-meter, he did not proceed to the finals of that event either. He and his teammates finished 5th in the 5,000-meter relay, and Krueger won the silver medal in the men's individual 1,000-meter event. By April 2018, Krueger was being described as "the most promising member of the U.S. short-track speedskating team".

At the end of April 2018, after his medal at the Olympic Winter Games in Pyeongchang, John-Henry Krueger announced his intent to formally seek release from U.S. Speedskating and the USOC, and to accept an offer to reside and skate in future for the nation of Hungary. His move to Budapest "reunited [him] with his older brother Cole, who left the US team" in 2016. and his formal competitions for the Hungarian national team began in 2020. En route to qualifying for the 2022 Winter Olympic Games in Beijing, Krueger earned silver medals for Hungary at the European Championships in Gdansk in the 1,000-meter men's individual event, and at the World Championships in Dordrecht in the 5,000-meter relay event (both in 2021). He is competing for Hungary in the 2022 Games in Beijing under national team coach Akos Banhidi, where as of February 11, he had earned a bronze medal in the 2000-meter mixed relay.

=== Olympic performance summary ===
Competing for the U.S., after qualifying for all short track events at the 2018 Winter Olympics in Pyeongchang—the only American to do so (among both men or women)—Krueger went on to win the silver medal in the men's 1,000-meter event, the first individual speed skating medal in short or long track for an American since the 2010 games, and the only short-track medal for the U.S. at 2018 games. He and his teammates finished 5th in the 5,000-meter relay, and Krueger was 25th in the 500-meter, and was eliminated in the semifinals via penalty in 1,500-meter.

As of February 11, 2022, competing for Hungary in the 2022 Winter Olympics in Beijing, Krueger had earned a bronze medal in the 2000-meter mixed relay.

== Issues with U.S. Speedskating ==
Multiple reports confirm a longstanding contentious relationship existed between U.S. Speedskating and the Kruegers—him, his brother Cole, and their parents—a rift that was broadly perceived in competitive skating circles. Krueger was "a promising prospect" for the 2014 Olympic team, but with no provision in U.S. Speedskating's rules for discretionary selection of team members, a bout of Swine flu led Krueger to withdraw from the U.S. trials, and so to his missing the 2014 Winter Olympics in Sochi. His being "at odds with the sport’s governing body" continued from that point, and included his conclusion that "he was better-served training elsewhere" (away from the Salt Lake City-based U.S. Speedskating), including in South Korea and the Netherlands. Citing earlier reporting from The Wall Street Journal, Rick Maese of the Washington Post catalogs a conflict dating back "several years", leading first to the 2016 departure by older brother Cole; issues included the organisation's role in the 2012 departure of U.S. national team coach Jae Su Chun (a coach that the Krueger brothers would both choose to follow); its requirement that the skaters represent the organisation's chosen sponsors (rather than seeking their own sponsors); a conflict over the organisation's athlete agreement; and its later "threa[t] to withhold a monthly stipend" for Krueger's "declin[ing] to wear a heart-rate monitor and share the data with U.S. coaches". Per The Wall Street Journal, the sponsorship issue, with its financial implications, rose to the level of the brothers "peel[ing] sponsor logos off their suits" and "turn[ing] jackets inside out… [on a] podium at a World Cup".

== Change of national affiliation ==
After the 2015-2016 competitive skating season, Krueger's brother Cole left the U.S. team to begin training with the Hungarian national team, "previously [having] made the switch to represent…" that country. As of March 2018, Cole was reported to be living in Hungary, and solely competing as a short-track speed skater with the Hungarian team. (Cole Krueger did not qualify for that nation's 2018 Olympic team.) At the end of April, following the Olympic Winter Games in Pyeongchang in 2018, John-Henry Krueger announced that he too had made the decision to represent Hungary, rather than the U.S., in future athletic competitions, for reasons related to the lack of athlete financial support in his sport and events. He was naturalised as a Hungarian citizen, also in 2018, where his family has indicated that his citizenship would be dual. While having "some ancestry" there, Krueger is not from Hungary, but could compete for them in future Olympics (after a wait of three years), given Olympic rules that allow this and "countries to grant citizenship as they see fit". In Olympic competition, it is not unheard of for athletes of one nation to compete for another, but known U.S. examples are "usually because they [don’t] qualify for the U.S. team," with the case of Olympians medaling earlier that change citizenship being rare.

USA Today was the first to report the news of the Krueger decision, which was made on Krueger's behalf by his mother, Heidi Weisenbacher-Krueger, via a Facebook post. Communicating with Martin Rogers of USA Today via email, at the time of the announcement, Krueger stated that he was

proud to have represented the United States during my career but have been faced with an unsustainable situation where if I continue pursuing my career with the US team I will bankrupt myself and my family... Overall the financial costs necessary for me to perform competitively at the international level are unsustainable with the lack of sufficient financial support from US Speedskating... Hungary supports its achieving athletes on a level above and beyond anything I have asked for or would ever ask for... I will be able to pay for basic necessities like groceries, rent, apartment furnishings, clothes and equipment without putting myself and my family in debt. The coaching and team in Hungary is competitive with any in the world. I am excited to see what I can achieve when these negative variables are removed.

Weisenbacher-Krueger was less restrained, stating that "[John-Henry] did not leave his country, but is leaving the federation that callously abandoned him on so many fronts long ago and then refused to thoughtfully consider any of [his] concerns, opinions, and requirements".

Despite the record of issues with U.S. Speedskating, in follow-up to the announcement, Krueger made clear that the decision was "largely financially motivated", and his spokesperson for the announcement, Weisenbacher-Krueger, made clear that their "US skating friends [would] always be… friends", but that with Kruger's having medaled for the U.S. in 2018, that "it [was] time to move on and make choices that [would] help him be the best skater he [could] be in 2022." In Hungary, he would be reunited with his older brother Cole, who left the US team after the 2015/2016 season. The view has been expressed that Krueger's absence would "certainly be felt by the U.S. short-track team" as their "biggest talent… and also the most promising skater heading into the 2022 Olympics in Beijing", with Rick Maese of the Washington Post noting Krueger's silver being the only U.S. short-track medal of 2018 and the first American individual Olympic medal since 2010.

He was kicked out of the Hungarian team in July 2022, due to misbehaving.

== Personal life ==
At the time of the Pyeongchang Olympics in 2018, Krueger was stating (to the NBC Olympics news organisation) that he someday "aspire[d] to teach English in a different country."
