= Lee Han-bin =

South Korean speed skater

Personal information
- Born: September 25, 1988 (age 37)

Sport

Korean name
- Hangul: 이한빈
- RR: I Hanbin
- MR: I Hanbin
Medal record
Men's short track speed skating
Representing South Korea
World Junior Championships
Bronze medal – third place	2008 Bolzano	Overall
World Championships
Silver medal – second place	2014 Montreal	5000 m relay

Lee Han-bin (born September 25, 1988) is a South Korean short track speed skater. He won the bronze medal by becoming third overall at the 2008 World Junior Championships in Bolzano.

== Education ==
- Korea National Sport University
- Seongnam Seohyun High School
- Seongnam Hatap Middle School
