= Bence Béres =

Hungarian speed skater

Bence Béres (born 26 August 1992 in Komárom) is a short track speed skater set to represent Hungary at the 2014 Winter Olympics.
