= Roberts Zvejnieks =

Short-track speed skater

Personal information
- Full name: Roberts Jānis Zvejnieks
- Born: 22 November 1997 (age 28) Ventspils, Latvia
- Height: 180 cm (5 ft 11 in)
- Weight: 68 kg (150 lb)

Sport
- Country: Latvia
- Sport: Short track speed skating

Roberts Jānis Zvejnieks (born 22 November 1997) is a short track speed skater who competed for Latvia at the 2018 Winter Olympics.
