= Sjinkie Knegt =

Dutch short-track speed-skater

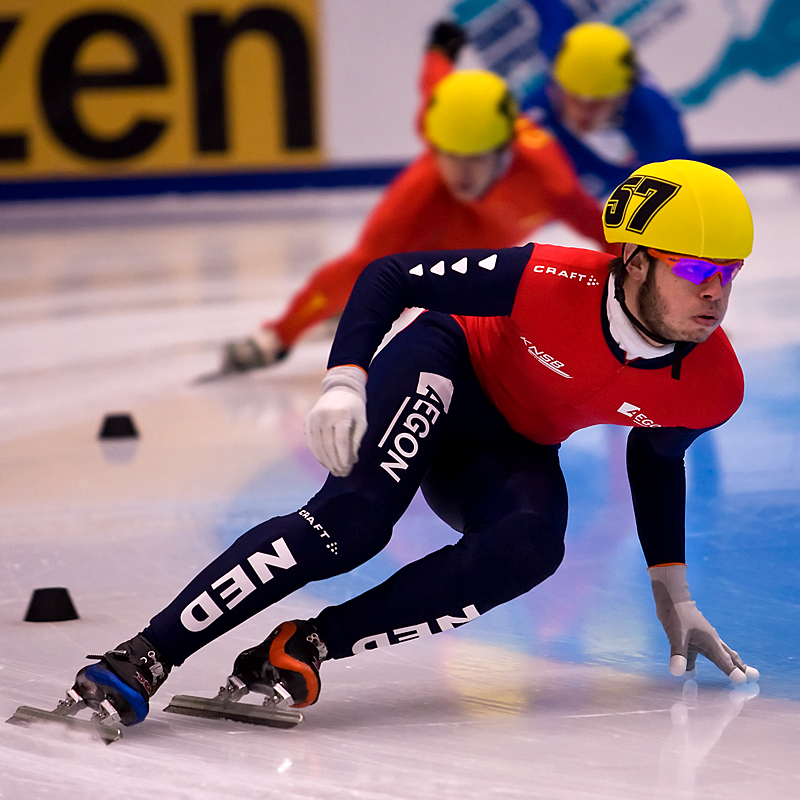
- Knegt in 2009

Personal information
- Nationality: Dutch
- Born: 5 July 1989 (age 37) Bantega, Netherlands
- Height: 1.72 m (5 ft 8 in)
- Weight: 70 kg (154 lb)

Sport
- Country: Netherlands
- Sport: Short track speed skating
- Club: Shorttrack Club Thialf

Achievements and titles
- Personal bests: 500 m: 40.263 (2018); 1000 m: 1:22.413 (2018); 1500 m: 2:07.943 WR (2016); 3000 m: 4:38.905 (2002)
Medal record
Olympic Games
| Silver medal – second place | 2018 Pyeongchang | 1500 m |
| Bronze medal – third place | 2014 Sochi | 1000 m |
World Championships
| Gold medal – first place | 2014 Montreal | 5000 m relay |
| Gold medal – first place | 2015 Moscow | Overall |
| Gold medal – first place | 2017 Rotterdam | 500 m |
| Gold medal – first place | 2017 Rotterdam | 5000 m relay |
| Gold medal – first place | 2021 Dordrecht | 5000 m relay |
| Silver medal – second place | 2012 Shanghai | 5000 m relay |
| Silver medal – second place | 2013 Debrecen | 1000 m |
| Silver medal – second place | 2014 Montreal | 1000 m |
| Silver medal – second place | 2015 Moscow | 1500 m |
| Silver medal – second place | 2017 Rotterdam | Overall |
| Silver medal – second place | 2022 Montreal | 5000 m relay |
| Bronze medal – third place | 2013 Debrecen | 5000 m relay |
| Bronze medal – third place | 2015 Moscow | 5000 m relay |
| Bronze medal – third place | 2018 Montreal | 1000 m |
European Championships
| Gold medal – first place | 2011 Heerenveen | 1500 m |
| Gold medal – first place | 2011 Heerenveen | 5000 m relay |
| Gold medal – first place | 2012 Mladá Boleslav | Overall |
| Gold medal – first place | 2012 Mladá Boleslav | 1000 m |
| Gold medal – first place | 2012 Mladá Boleslav | 1500 m |
| Gold medal – first place | 2012 Mladá Boleslav | 5000 m relay |
| Gold medal – first place | 2013 Malmö | 1500 m |
| Gold medal – first place | 2015 Dordrecht | Overall |
| Gold medal – first place | 2015 Dordrecht | 1000 m |
| Gold medal – first place | 2015 Dordrecht | 1500 m |
| Gold medal – first place | 2016 Sochi | 500 m |
| Gold medal – first place | 2016 Sochi | 5000 m relay |
| Gold medal – first place | 2017 Turin | 500 m |
| Gold medal – first place | 2017 Turin | 5000 m relay |
| Gold medal – first place | 2018 Dresden | 500 m |
| Gold medal – first place | 2018 Dresden | 1000 m |
| Gold medal – first place | 2018 Dresden | 1500 m |
| Gold medal – first place | 2018 Dresden | Overall |
| Gold medal – first place | 2018 Dresden | 5000 m relay |
| Gold medal – first place | 2021 Gdansk | 5000 m relay |
| Silver medal – second place | 2009 Turin | 5000 m relay |
| Silver medal – second place | 2011 Heerenveen | Overall |
| Silver medal – second place | 2013 Malmö | Overall |
| Silver medal – second place | 2013 Malmö | 500 m |
| Silver medal – second place | 2013 Malmö | 5000 m relay |
| Silver medal – second place | 2014 Dresden | 500 m |
| Silver medal – second place | 2014 Dresden | 5000 m relay |
| Silver medal – second place | 2015 Dordrecht | 500 m |
| Silver medal – second place | 2025 Dresden | 2000 m mixed relay |
| Bronze medal – third place | 2011 Heerenveen | 500 m |
| Bronze medal – third place | 2015 Dordrecht | 5000 m relay |
| Bronze medal – third place | 2017 Turin | Overall |
| Bronze medal – third place | 2021 Gdansk | 1500 m |

Sjinkie Knegt (Dutch pronunciation: [ˈɕɪŋki ˈknɛxt]; born 5 July 1989) is a Dutch short track speed skater.

== Career ==
He competed for the Netherlands at the 2010 Winter Olympics in the men's 500 m, 1000 m, and 1500m. At the January 2014 European Short Track Speed Skating Championships, he was disqualified from the 5000m relay final after making an obscene hand gesture at first-place finisher Victor Ahn of Russia. At the 2014 Sochi Olympics, he won a bronze medal in the 1000 meter race. This was the first medal for the Netherlands at the Olympics in short track.

In 2015 Knegt won both the European and world titles in the overall competition.

At the 2018 Pyeongchang Olympics, Knegt won the silver medal in the men's 1500 metres race.
