= Aleksandr Shulginov =

Russian speed skater

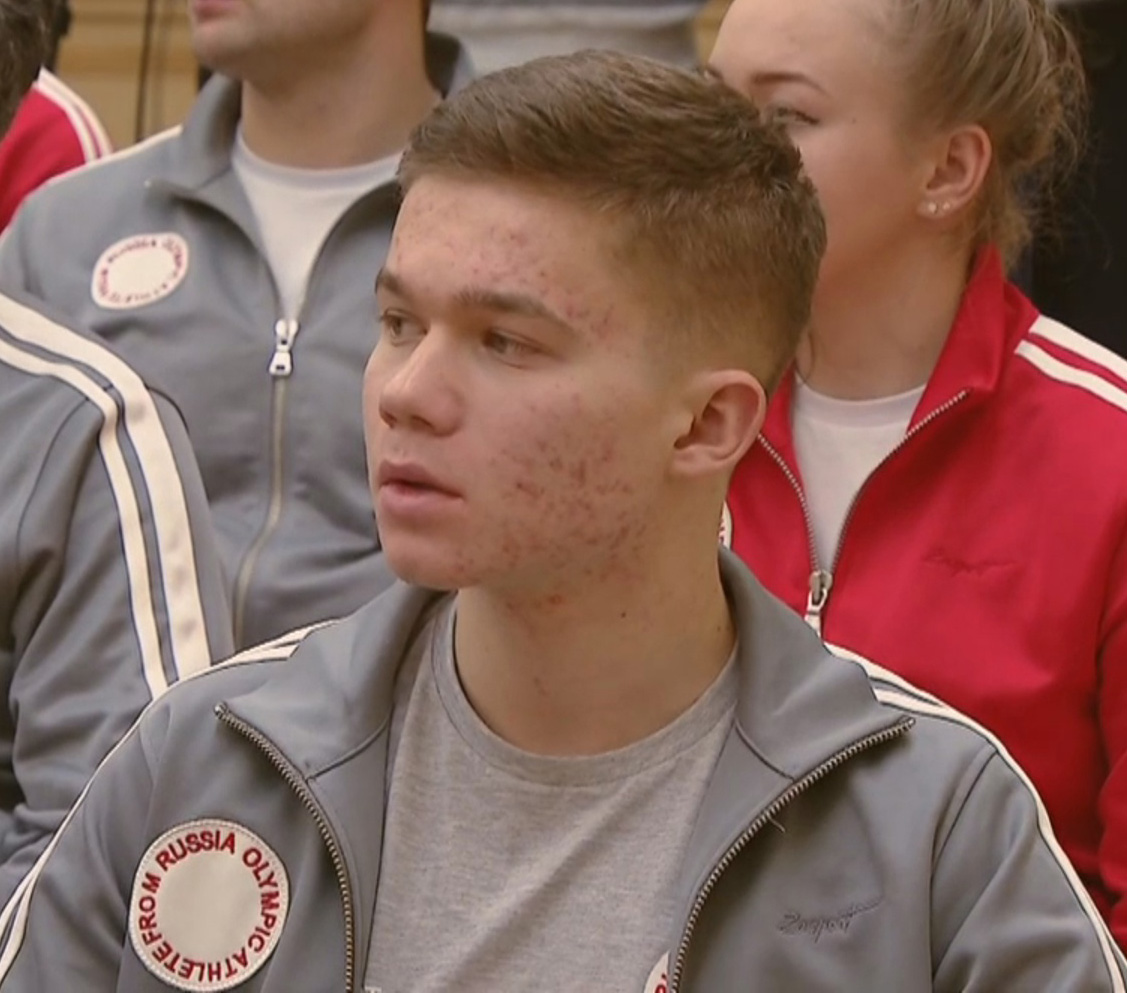

Personal information
- Full name: Aleksandr Valeryevich Shulginov
- Nationality: Russian
- Born: 1 March 1998 (age 28) Klin, Russia
- Height: 1.78 m (5 ft 10 in)
- Weight: 75 kg (165 lb)

Sport
- Country: Russia
- Sport: Short track speed skating
Medal record
Men's short track speed skating
Representing Russia
European Championships
Gold medal – first place	2020 Debrecen	5000 m relay
Silver medal – second place	2017 Torino	5000 m relay
Silver medal – second place	2018 Dresden	5000 m relay
Bronze medal – third place	2019 Dordrecht	5000 m relay

Aleksandr Valeryevich Shulginov (Russian: Александр Валерьевич Шульгинов; born 1 March 1998) is a Russian short track speed skater. He competed in the 2018 Winter Olympics.
