= Pavel Sitnikov =

Russian short-track speed skater

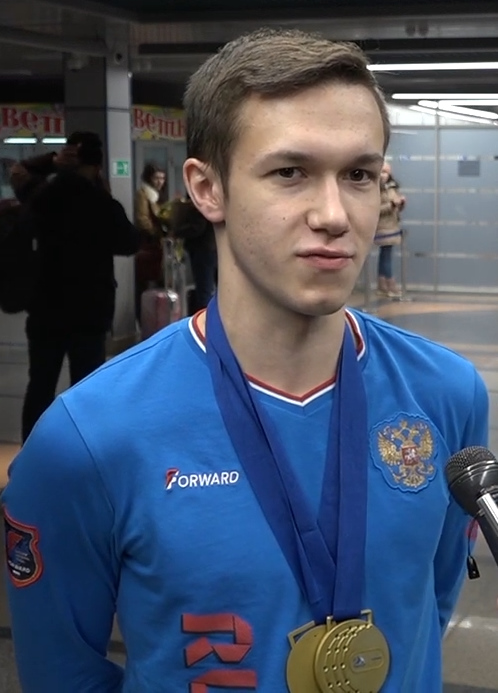
- Sitnikov in 2019

Personal information
- Full name: Pavel Vladimirovich Sitnikov
- Nationality: Russian
- Born: 5 August 1998 (age 27) Omsk, Russia
- Height: 1.75 m (5 ft 9 in)
- Weight: 65 kg (143 lb)

Sport
- Country: Russia
- Sport: Short track speed skating
Medal record
Men's short track speed skating
Representing Russia
European Championships
Gold medal – first place	2020 Debrecen	5000 m relay
Silver medal – second place	2018 Dresden	5000 m relay
Bronze medal – third place	2019 Dordrecht	500 m
Bronze medal – third place	2019 Dordrecht	5000 m relay
Bronze medal – third place	2021 Gdańsk	5000 m relay

Pavel Vladimirovich Sitnikov (Russian: Павел Владимирович Ситников; born 5 August 1998) is a Russian short track speed skater. He competed in the 2018 Winter Olympics and the 2022 Winter Olympics.
