= Sébastien Lepape =

French short-track speed skater

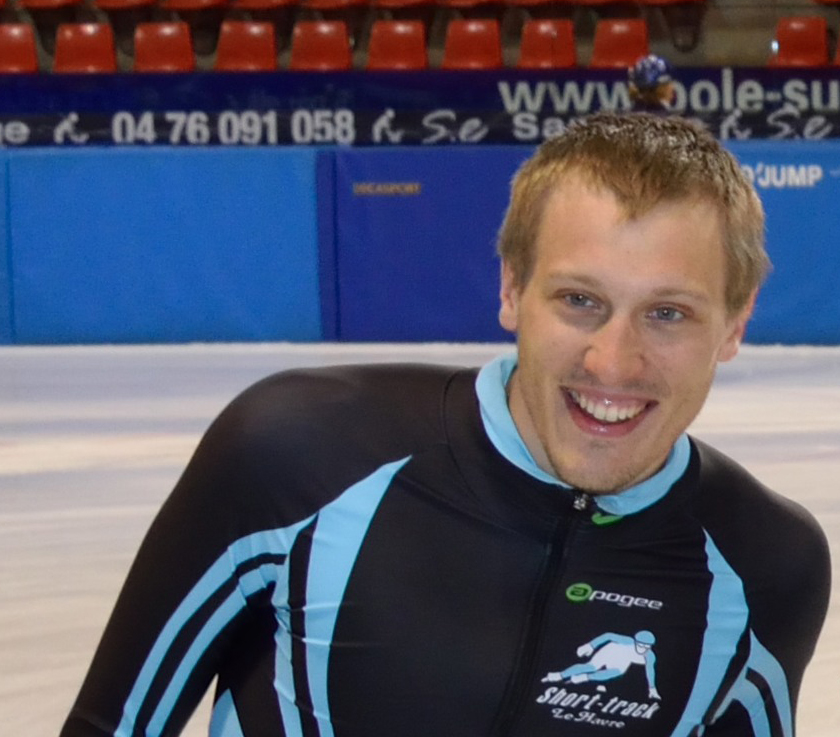
- Lepape in 2017

Personal information
- Born: 4 July 1991 (age 34) Montivilliers, France
- Height: 189 cm (6 ft 2 in)
- Weight: 82 kg (181 lb)

Sport
- Country: France
- Sport: Short track speed skating
- Coached by: Cho Hangmin
Medal record
European Championships
Bronze medal – third place	2018 Dresden	500 m
Bronze medal – third place	2018 Dresden	3000 m SF

Sébastien Lepape (born 4 July 1991 in Montivilliers) is a French male short track speed skater.
