= List of flag bearers for South Korea at the Olympics =

South Korea at the Olympics
- IOC code: KOR
- NOC: Korean Olympic Committee
- Website: www.sports.or.kr (in Korean and English)
- Medals: Gold 142 Silver 130 Bronze 127 Total 399

Summer appearances
- 1948; 1952; 1956; 1960; 1964; 1968; 1972; 1976; 1980; 1984; 1988; 1992; 1996; 2000; 2004; 2008; 2012; 2016; 2020; 2024; 2028

Winter appearances
- 1948; 1952; 1956; 1960; 1964; 1968; 1972; 1976; 1980; 1984; 1988; 1992; 1994; 1998; 2002; 2006; 2010; 2014; 2018; 2022; 2026

Other related appearances
- Korea (2018)

This is a list of flag bearers who have represented South Korea at the Olympics.

Flag bearers carry the national flag of their country at the opening ceremony of the Olympic Games.

| # | Event year | Season | Flag bearer | Sport |
|---|---|---|---|---|
| 1 | 1948 | Summer | An Byeong-seok (Note: Other sources on this page list Son Gi-Jeong as the 1948 flag bearer) | Basketball |
| 2 | 1972 | Summer | Kim Ji-Hak | Coach |
| 3 | 1984 | Summer | Ha Hyung-Joo | Judo |
| 4 | 1988 | Winter | Hong Kun-Pyo | Cross-country skiing |
| 5 | 1988 | Summer | Cho Yong-Chul | Judo |
| 6 | 1992 | Winter | Lee Young-ha | Speed skating |
| 7 | 1994 | Winter | Lee Joon-ho | Short track speed skating |
| 8 | 1996 | Summer | Choi Cheon-Sik | Volleyball |
| 9 | 1998 | Winter | Hur Seung-Wook | Alpine skiing |
| 10 | 2000 | Summer | Chung Eun-soon (Note: Team marched with North Korea under the Korean Unification Flag) | Basketball |
| 11 | 2002 | Winter | Hur Seung-Wook | Alpine skiing |
| 12 | 2004 | Summer | Ku Min-jung | Volleyball |
| 13 | 2006 | Winter | Lee Bo-ra | Speed skating |
| 14 | 2008 | Summer | Jang Sung-ho | Judo |
| 15 | 2010 | Winter | Kang Kwang-bae | Bobsleigh |
| 16 | 2012 | Summer | Yoon Kyung-shin | Handball |
| 17 | 2014 | Winter | Lee Kyou-hyuk | Speed skating |
| 18 | 2016 | Summer | Gu Bon-gil | Fencing |
| 19 | 2018 | Winter | Won Yun-jong (Note: South Korea didn't march at the Parade of Nations. Its delegates along with North Korea's marched in the opening ceremony as "Korea". South Korean bobsleigher Won Yun-jong along with North Korean ice hockey player Hwang Chung-gum were the flagbearers of the unified Korea team.) | Bobsleigh |
| 20 | 2020 | Summer | Hwang Sun-woo | Swimming |
| 20 | 2020 | Summer | Kim Yeon-koung | Volleyball |
| 21 | 2022 | Winter | Kim A-lang | Short track speed skating |
| 21 | 2022 | Winter | Kwak Yoon-gy | Short track speed skating |
| 22 | 2024 | Summer | Kim Seo-yeong | Swimming |
| 22 | 2024 | Summer | Woo Sang-hyeok | Athletics |
| 23 | 2026 | Winter | Cha Jun-hwan | Figure skating |
| 23 | 2026 | Winter | Park Ji-woo | Speed skating |

== See also ==
- South Korea at the Olympics
