= South Korea at the 1992 Winter Olympics =

- IOC code: KOR
- NOC: Korean Olympic Committee
- Website: www.sports.or.kr (in Korean and English)

in Albertville
- Competitors: 23 in 6 sports
- Flag bearer: Lee Yeong-ha
- Officials: 25
- Medals Ranked 10th: Gold 2 Silver 1 Bronze 1 Total 4

Winter Olympics appearances (overview)
- 1948; 1952; 1956; 1960; 1964; 1968; 1972; 1976; 1980; 1984; 1988; 1992; 1994; 1998; 2002; 2006; 2010; 2014; 2018; 2022; 2026

Other related appearances
- Korea (2018)

South Korea was represented at the 1992 Winter Olympics in Albertville, France by the Korean Olympic Committee.

In total, 23 athletes including 19 men and four women represented South Korea in six different sports including alpine skiing, biathlon, cross-country skiing, figure skating, short track speed skating and speed skating.

South Korea won four medals at the games, all in short track speed skating, after Kim Ki-hoon won gold in the women's 500 m, the men's relay team won gold in the men's 5,000 m relay and Kim Yoon-man and Lee Joon-ho won silver and bronze respectively in the men's 1,000 m.

== Competitors ==
In total, 23 athletes represented South Korea at the 1992 Winter Olympics in Albertville, France across six different sports.

Sport	Men	Women	Total
Alpine skiing	2	0	2
Biathlon	4	0	4
Cross-country skiing	4	0	4
Figure skating	1	1	2
Short track speed skating	4	2	6
Speed skating	4	1	5
Total	19	4	23

== Medalists ==
South Korea won a total of four medals at the games including two golds, one silver and one bronze.

Medal	Name	Sport	Event	Date
Gold	Kim Ki-hoon	Short track speed skating	Men's 1,000 metres	20 February
Gold	Kim Ki-hoon; Lee Joon-ho; Mo Ji-soo; Song Jae-kun	Short track speed skating	Men's 5,000 metre relay	22 February
Silver	Kim Yoon-man	Speed skating	Men's 1,000 metres	18 February
Bronze	Lee Joon-ho	Short track speed skating	Men's 1,000 metres	20 February

== Alpine skiing ==
In total, two South Korean athletes participated in the alpine skiing events – Choi Yong-hee and Huh Sung-wook.

Athlete	Event	Record	Rank
Choi Yong-hee	Downhill	2:04.85	39
Choi Yong-hee	Combined Downhill	1:55.68	47
Choi Yong-hee	Combined Slalom	2:00.97	33
Choi Yong-hee	Giant Slalom	did not finish	-
Choi Yong-hee	Slalom	2:03.73	27
Choi Yong-hee	Super G	1:22.75	63
Huh Sung-wook	Combined Downhill	1:55.27	46
Huh Sung-wook	Combined Slalom	did not finish	-
Huh Sung-wook	Giant Slalom	Disqualified	-
Huh Sung-wook	Slalom	did not finish	-
Huh Sung-wook	Super G	1:20.96	54

== Biathlon ==
In total, four South Korean athletes participated in the biathlon events – Hong Byung-sik, Jang Dong-lin, Kim Woon-ki and Han Myung-hee.

Athlete	Event	Record	Rank
Hong Byung-sik	10 km	32:59.2	84
Hong Byung-sik	20 km	1:15:06.7	87
Jang Dong-lin	10 km	34:44.2	88
Jang Dong-lin	20 km	1:17:06.9	88
Kim Woon-ki	10 km	35:05.8	89
Han Myung-hee	10 km	35:48.9	90
Han Myung-hee	20 km	1:19:28.1	89
Kim Woon-ki; Hong Byung-sik; Jang Dong-lin; Han Myung-hee	4 × 7.5 km Relay	1:47:24.4	21

== Cross-country skiing ==
In total, four South Korean athletes participated in the cross-country skiing events – Park Byung-chul, An Jin-soo, Kim Kwang-rae and Wi Jae-wook.

Athlete	Event	Record	Rank
Park Byung-chul	10 km	31:10.0	40
Park Byung-chul	15 km	45:20.4	51
Park Byung-chul	30 km	1:33:01.8	55
An Jin-soo	10 km	34:26.4	77
An Jin-soo	15 km	53:14.2	79
An Jin-soo	30 km	1:40:24.7	70
Kim Kwang-rae	10 km	35:26.8	85
Kim Kwang-rae	15 km	53:51.4	81
Kim Kwang-rae	30 km	1:41:34.4	71
Wi Jae-wook	10 km	36:53.7	95
Wi Jae-wook	15 km	55:39.1	86
Wi Jae-wook	30 km	did not finish	-
Park Byung-chul; An Jin-soo; Kim Kwang-rae; Wi Jae-wook	4 × 10 km Relay	2:01:01.4	15

== Figure skating ==
In total, two South Korean athletes participated in the figure skating events – Jung Sung-il and Lee Eun-hee.

Athlete	Event	Rank
Jung Sung-il	Single	21

Athlete	Event	Rank
Lee Eun-hee	Single	27

== Short track speed skating ==
In total, six South Korean athletes participated in the short track speed skating events – Kim Ki-hoon, Lee Joon-ho, Song Jae-kun, Mo Ji-soo, Chun Lee-kyung and Kim So-hee.

Athlete	Event	Heats		Quarterfinals		Semifinals		Final	
Athlete	Event	Time	Rank	Time	Rank	Time	Rank	Time	Rank
Kim Ki-hoon	1000 metres	1:33.79	1st	1:32.67	1st	1:32.12	1st	1:30.76	1st place, gold medalist(s)
Lee Joon-ho	1000 metres	1:39.30	2nd	1:33.51	1st	1:31.27	1st	1:31.16	3rd place, bronze medalist(s)
Song Jae-kun	1000 metres	1:37.86	3rd	Ranking Round					20th
Kim Ki-hoon; Lee Joon-ho; Song Jae-kun; Mo Ji-soo	5000 metres Relay			7:14.07	1st	7:20.57	1st	7:14.02	1st place, gold medalist(s)

Athlete	Event	Heats		Quarterfinals		Semifinals		Final	
Athlete	Event	Time	Rank	Time	Rank	Time	Rank	Time	Rank
Chun Lee-kyung	500 metres	48.18	2nd	48.25	3rd	Ranking Round			12th
Kim So-hee	500 metres	50.99	1st	54.90	3rd	Ranking Round			9th

== Speed skating ==
In total, five South Korean athletes participated in the speed skating events – Kim Yoon-man, Jegal Sung-ryeol, Lee In-hun, Oh Yeong-seok and Yoo Seon-hee.

Athlete	Event	Record	Rank
Kim Yoon-man	500m	37.60	10
Kim Yoon-man	1000m	1:14.86	2nd place, silver medalist(s)
Jegal Sung-ryeol	500m	37.71	12
Jegal Sung-ryeol	1000m	1:17.34	T26
Lee In-hun	500m	38.74	31
Lee In-hun	1000m	1:19.08	39
Oh Yeong-seok	1500m	2:02.17	39

Athlete	Event	Record	Rank
Yoo Seon-hee	500m	41.28	9
Yoo Seon-hee	1000m	1:23.49	11
