= South Korea at the 1980 Winter Olympics =

- IOC code: KOR
- NOC: Korean Olympic Committee
- Website: www.sports.or.kr (in Korean and English)

in Lake Placid
- Competitors: 10 in 4 sports
- Officials: 10
- Medals: Gold 0 Silver 0 Bronze 0 Total 0

Winter Olympics appearances (overview)
- 1948; 1952; 1956; 1960; 1964; 1968; 1972; 1976; 1980; 1984; 1988; 1992; 1994; 1998; 2002; 2006; 2010; 2014; 2018; 2022; 2026

Other related appearances
- Korea (2018)

South Korea, as Republic of Korea, competed at the 1980 Winter Olympics in Lake Placid, United States.

== Alpine skiing ==
Men

Athlete	Event	Record	Rank
Hong In-Gi	Downhill	2:03.08	40
Hong In-Gi	Giant Slalom	3:20.80	49
Hong In-Gi	Slalom	Did Not Finish	-

== Cross-country skiing ==
Men

Athlete	Event	Record	Rank
Kim Dong-Hwan	15 km	Did Not Finish	-
Kim Dong-Hwan	30 km	1:51:13.35	51
Kim Nam-Young	15 km	0:53:05.55	58
Kim Nam-Young	30 km	Did Not Finish	-
Hwang Byung-Dae	15 km	0:53:05.60	59
Hwang Byung-Dae	30 km	Did Not Finish	-

== Figure skating ==
Women

Athlete	Points	Places	Rank
Shin Hye-Sook	128.18	186	20

== Speed skating ==
Men

Athlete	Event	Record	Rank
Lee Young-Ha	500m	39.33	19
Lee Young-Ha	1000m	1:20.04	22
Lee Young-Ha	1500m	2:02.37	22
Ra Yoon-Soo	1500m	2:06.65	26
Ra Yoon-Soo	5000m	7:39.62	24
Ra Yoon-Soo	10000m	16:00.41	23

Women

Athlete	Event	Record	Rank
Lee Nam-Soon	500m	43.85	14
Lee Nam-Soon	1000m	1:31.30	26
Lee Seong-Ae	1000m	1:32.04	30
Lee Seong-Ae	1500m	2:20.67	26
Lee Seong-Ae	3000m	4:58.77	24
Kim Young-Hee	1000m	1:34.17	34
Kim Young-Hee	1500m	2:20.23	25
Kim Young-Hee	3000m	4:58.41	22
