= South Korea at the 1960 Winter Olympics =

- IOC code: KOR
- NOC: Korean Olympic Committee
- Website: www.sports.or.kr (in Korean and English)

in Squaw Valley
- Competitors: 7 in 3 sports
- Officials: 3
- Medals: Gold 0 Silver 0 Bronze 0 Total 0

Winter Olympics appearances (overview)
- 1948; 1952; 1956; 1960; 1964; 1968; 1972; 1976; 1980; 1984; 1988; 1992; 1994; 1998; 2002; 2006; 2010; 2014; 2018; 2022; 2026

Other related appearances
- Korea (2018)

South Korea, as Republic of Korea, competed at the 1960 Winter Olympics in Squaw Valley, United States.

== Alpine skiing ==
Men

Athlete	Event	Record	Rank
Yim Kyung-Soon	Giant Slalom	Disqualified	-
Yim Kyung-Soon	Downhill	3:34.4	61
Yim Kyung-Soon	Slalom	4:56.1	40

== Cross-country skiing ==
Men

Athlete	Event	Record	Rank
Kim Ha-Yoon	15 km	1:15:26.5	54

== Speed skating ==
Men

Athlete	Event	Record	Rank
Chang Yeong	500m	50.0	44
Chang Yeong	1500m	2:25.3	41
Choi Young-Bae	1500m	2:26.7	42
Choi Young-Bae	5000m	8:57.8	34
Choi Young-Bae	10000m	18:15.5	28
Chang Rin-Won	1500m	2:30.7	44
Chang Rin-Won	5000m	9:01.6	35
Chang Rin-Won	10000m	17:45.7	26

Women

Athlete	Event	Record	Rank
Kim Kyung-Hoi	500m	53.2	21
Kim Kyung-Hoi	1000m	Did not finish	-
Kim Kyung-Hoi	1500m	2:48.6	21
Kim Kyung-Hoi	3000m	6:08.2	20
Han Hye-Ja	500m	53.8	22
Han Hye-Ja	1000m	1:48.8	20
Han Hye-Ja	1500m	2:55.6	23
