= South Korea at the 1964 Winter Olympics =

- IOC code: KOR
- NOC: Korean Olympic Committee
- Website: www.sports.or.kr (in Korean and English)

in Innsbruck
- Competitors: 7 in 3 sports
- Officials: 4
- Medals: Gold 0 Silver 0 Bronze 0 Total 0

Winter Olympics appearances (overview)
- 1948; 1952; 1956; 1960; 1964; 1968; 1972; 1976; 1980; 1984; 1988; 1992; 1994; 1998; 2002; 2006; 2010; 2014; 2018; 2022; 2026

Other related appearances
- Korea (2018)

South Korea, as Republic of Korea, competed at the 1964 Winter Olympics in Innsbruck, Austria.

== Alpine skiing ==
Men

Athlete	Event	Record	Rank
Cho Jeong-Soo	Giant Slalom	2:55.74	77
Kim Dong-Bok	Giant Slalom	Disqualified	-

== Cross-country skiing ==
Men

Athlete	Event	Record	Rank
Yang Yong-Ok	15 km	Disqualified	-
Yang Yong-Ok	30 km	2:28:54.7	66
Yang Yong-Ok	50 km	Did Not Finish	-

== Speed skating ==
Men

Athlete	Event	Record	Rank
Choi Young-Bae	500m	44.8	42
Choi Young-Bae	1500m	2:20.3	40
Choi Young-Bae	5000m	8:03.4	17
Choi Young-Bae	10000m	17:31.3	31
Choi Nam-Youn	1500m	2:30.2	52
Choi Nam-Youn	5000m	8:28.0	36

Women

Athlete	Event	Record	Rank
Kim Hye-Sook	500m	49.6	20
Kim Hye-Sook	1000m	1:45.1	26
Kim Kui-Chin	1500m	2:39.7	27
Kim Kui-Chin	3000m	5:41.6	19
