= South Korea at the 1956 Winter Olympics =

- IOC code: KOR (COR used at these Games)
- NOC: Korean Olympic Committee
- Website: www.sports.or.kr (in Korean and English)

in Cortina d'Ampezzo
- Competitors: 4 in 1 sport
- Officials: 1
- Medals: Gold 0 Silver 0 Bronze 0 Total 0

Winter Olympics appearances (overview)
- 1948; 1952; 1956; 1960; 1964; 1968; 1972; 1976; 1980; 1984; 1988; 1992; 1994; 1998; 2002; 2006; 2010; 2014; 2018; 2022; 2026

Other related appearances
- Korea (2018)

South Korea, as Republic of Korea, competed at the 1956 Winter Olympics in Cortina d'Ampezzo, Italy. The nation returned to the Winter Games after missing the 1952 Winter Olympics due to Korean War.

== Speed skating ==
Athlete	Event	Record	Rank
Chang Yeong	500m	43.5	28
Chang Yeong	1500m	2:16.7	29
Chang Yeong	5000m	8:17.6	23
Cho Youn-Sik	500m	44.0	34
Cho Youn-Sik	1500m	2:20.0	T42
Kim Chong-Soon	1500m	2:20.5	44
Kim Chong-Soon	5000m	8:34.3	36
Kim Chong-Soon	10000m	17:52.6	30
Pyung Chang-Nam	1500m	2:23.5	T51
Pyung Chang-Nam	5000m	8:36.7	37
