= South Korea at the 1998 Winter Olympics =

- IOC code: KOR
- NOC: Korean Olympic Committee
- Website: www.sports.or.kr (in Korean and English)

in Nagano
- Competitors: 37 (26 men and 11 women) in 8 sports
- Flag bearer: Hur Seung-Wook
- Officials: 25
- Medals Ranked 9th: Gold 3 Silver 1 Bronze 2 Total 6

Winter Olympics appearances (overview)
- 1948; 1952; 1956; 1960; 1964; 1968; 1972; 1976; 1980; 1984; 1988; 1992; 1994; 1998; 2002; 2006; 2010; 2014; 2018; 2022; 2026

Other related appearances
- Korea (2018)

South Korea, as Republic of Korea, competed at the 1998 Winter Olympics in Nagano, Japan.

== Medalists ==
| Medal | Name | Sport | Event | Date |
|---|---|---|---|---|
| Gold | Kim Dong-Sung | Short track speed skating | Men's 1000 metres | 17 February |
| Gold | Chun Lee-Kyung; Won Hye-Kyung; An Sang-Mi; Kim Yoon-Mi | Short track speed skating | Women's 3000 metre relay | 17 February |
| Gold | Chun Lee-Kyung | Short track speed skating | Women's 1000 metres | 21 February |
| Silver | Chae Ji-Hoon; Lee Jun-Hwan; Lee Ho-Eung; Kim Dong-Sung | Short track speed skating | Men's 5000 metre relay | 21 February |
| Bronze | Chun Lee-Kyung | Short track speed skating | Women's 500 metres | 19 February |
| Bronze | Won Hye-Kyung | Short track speed skating | Women's 1000 metres | 21 February |

== Competitors ==
The following is the list of number of competitors in the Games.

| Sport | Men | Women | Total |
|---|---|---|---|
| Alpine skiing | 2 | 0 | 2 |
| Biathlon | 1 | 0 | 1 |
| Cross-country skiing | 4 | 0 | 4 |
| Figure skating | 1 | 0 | 1 |
| Luge | 3 | 0 | 3 |
| Short track speed skating | 4 | 5 | 9 |
| Ski jumping | 4 | – | 4 |
| Speed skating | 7 | 6 | 13 |
| Total | 26 | 11 | 37 |

== Alpine skiing ==
Men

| Athlete | Event | Record | Rank |
|---|---|---|---|
| Hur Sung-Wook | Giant Slalom | 2:52.27 | 33 |
| Hur Sung-Wook | Slalom | 1:58.01 | 23 |
| Byun Jong-Moon | Giant Slalom | Did not finish | - |
| Byun Jong-Moon | Slalom | Did not finish | - |

== Biathlon ==
Men

| Athlete | Event | Record | Penalty | Rank |
|---|---|---|---|---|
| Jeon Jae-Won | 10 km | 35:09.5 | 6 | 70 |
| Jeon Jae-Won | 20 km | 1:15:17.8 | 13 | 71 |

== Cross-country skiing ==
Men

| Athlete | Event | Record | Rank |
|---|---|---|---|
| Park Byeong-ju | 10 km | 30:42.1 | 53 |
| Park Byeong-ju | 15 km | Did not finish | - |
| Park Byeong-ju | 30 km | 1:47:41.5 | 55 |
| An Jin-Soo | 10 km | 31:55.5 | 74 |
| An Jin-Soo | 15 km | 1:18:51.4 | 66 |
| An Jin-Soo | 30 km | 1:54:12.2 | 63 |
| Park Byung-Joo | 10 km | 32:46.1 | 79 |
| Park Byung-Joo | 15 km | 1:19:19.8 | 67 |
| Shin Doo-Sun | 50 km | 2:33:27.3 | 61 |
| Park Byeong-ju; An Jin-Soo; Shin Doo-Sun; Park Byung-Joo | 4 × 10 km Relay | 1:55:17.1 | 20 |

== Figure skating ==
Men

| Athlete | Event | TFP | Rank |
|---|---|---|---|
| Lee Kyu-Hyun | Single | 35.5 | 24 |

== Luge ==
Men

| Athlete | Event | Record | Rank |
|---|---|---|---|
| Lee Gi-Ro | Single | 3:34.721 | 29 |
| Kang Kwang-Bae | Single | 3:35.958 | 31 |
| Lee Yong | Single | 3:40.407 | 32 |

== Short track speed skating ==
Men

| Athlete | Event | Heats | | Quarterfinals | | Semifinals | | Final | |
| Athlete | Event | Time | Rank | Time | Rank | Time | Rank | Time | Rank |
|---|---|---|---|---|---|---|---|---|---|
| Kim Dong-Sung | 500 metres | 43.653 | 2nd | 43.810 | 2nd | 43.096 | 3rd | 43.090 | 8th |
| Kim Dong-Sung | 1000 metres | 1:33.039 | 2nd | 1:32.423 | 2nd | 1:32.036 | 1st | 1:32.375 | 1st place, gold medalist(s) |
| Lee Jun-Hwan | 500 metres | 43.840 | 1st | 44.417 | 4th | Ranking Round | | | 12th |
| Lee Jun-Hwan | 1000 metres | 1:32.879 | 1st | 1:38.115 | 3rd | 1:32.634 | 4th | 1:33.131 | 7th |
| Chae Ji-Hoon | 500 metres | 43.011 | 2nd | 43.622 | 2nd | 43.864 | 4th | 42.832 | 5th |
| Chae Ji-Hoon | 1000 metres | 1:35.240 | 1st | 1:34.902 | 2nd | DQ | - | Ranking Round | 10th |
| Chae Ji-Hoon; Kim Dong-Sung; Lee Jun-Hwan; Lee Ho-Eung | 5000 metres Relay | | | | | 7:07.457 | 1st | 7:06.776 | 2nd place, silver medalist(s) |

Women

| Athlete | Event | Heats | | Quarterfinals | | Semifinals | | Final | |
| Athlete | Event | Time | Rank | Time | Rank | Time | Rank | Time | Rank |
|---|---|---|---|---|---|---|---|---|---|
| Chun Lee-Kyung | 500 metres | 48.024 | 1st | 46.163 | 2nd | 46.168 | 4th | 46.335 | 3rd place, bronze medalist(s) |
| Chun Lee-Kyung | 1000 metres | 1:39.107 | 1st | 1:38.068 | 1st | 1:34.789 | 2nd | 1:42.776 | 1st place, gold medalist(s) |
| Kim Yoon-Mi | 500 metres | 48.184 | 2nd | 46.640 | 2nd | 47.337 | 5th | Ranking Round | 10th |
| Kim Yoon-Mi | 1000 metres | 1:39.042 | 1st | 1:32.097 | 2nd | 1:38.420 | 4th | 1:37.777 | 6th |
| Choi Min-Kyung | 500 metres | 46.126 | 2nd | 46.033 | 1st | 46.000 | 3rd | 46.504 | 4th |
| Won Hye-Kyung | 1000 metres | 1:44.005 | 1st | 1:36.210 | 1st | 1:35.606 | 1st | 1:43,361 | 3rd place, bronze medalist(s) |
| An Sang-Mi; Chun Lee-Kyung; Kim Yoon-Mi; Won Hye-Kyung | 3000 metres Relay | | | | | 4:21.510 | 1st | 4:16.260 | 1st place, gold medalist(s) |

== Ski jumping ==
Men

| Athlete | Event | Record | Rank |
|---|---|---|---|
| Choi Heung-Chul | K90 Individual | 77.5 | 46 |
| Choi Heung-Chul | K120 Individual | 89.1 | 40 |
| Kim Hyun-Ki | K90 Individual | 61.5 | 59 |
| Kim Hyun-Ki | K120 Individual | 72.9 | 51 |
| Kim Heung-Soo | K90 Individual | 59.5 | 61 |
| Kim Heung-Soo | K120 Individual | 9.9 | 62 |
| Choi Yong-Jik | K90 Individual | 69.0 | 53 |
| Choi Yong-Jik | K120 Individual | 66.6 | 53 |
| Choi Heung-Chul; Kim Hyun-Ki; Kim Heung-Soo; Choi Yong-Jik | K120 Team | 373.8 | 13 |

== Speed skating ==
Men

| Athlete | Event | Record | Rank |
|---|---|---|---|
| Kim Yoon-Man | 500 m | 1:12.36 | 7 |
| Kim Yoon-Man | 1000 m | 1:12.50 | 20 |
| Lee Kyu-Hyuk | 500 m | 1:12.55 | 8 |
| Lee Kyu-Hyuk | 1000 m | 1:12.05 | 13 |
| Jegal Seong-Ryeol | 500 m | 1:12.97 | T16 |
| Jegal Seong-Ryeol | 1000 m | 1:13.09 | 30 |
| Kim Jin-su | 500 m | 1:14.32 | 34 |
| Chun Joo-Hyun | 1000 m | 1:12.55 | T21 |
| Chun Joo-Hyun | 1500 m | 1:51.65 | 15 |
| Choi Jae-Bong | 1500 m | 1:51.47 | 12 |
| Choi Jae-Bong | 5000 m | 6:54.62 | 29 |
| Jeong Jin-Wook | 1500 m | 1:55.02 | 39 |

Women

| Athlete | Event | Record | Rank |
|---|---|---|---|
| Choi Seung-yong | 500 m | 1:20.79 | T24 |
| Choi Seung-yong | 1000 m | 1:21.28 | 24 |
| Chun Hee-Joo | 500 m | 1:21.62 | 29 |
| Chun Hee-Joo | 1000 m | 1:22.06 | 30 |
| Kang Mi-Young | 500 m | 1:22.25 | 30 |
| Kang Mi-Young | 1000 m | 1:24.18 | 38 |
| Kim Ju-Hyun | 500 m | 1:22.79 | T33 |
| Kim Ju-Hyun | 1000 m | 1:23.18 | 35 |
| Baek Eun-Bi | 1500 m | 2:05.23 | 25 |
| Baek Eun-Bi | 3000 m | 4:24.50 | 23 |
| Lee Kyeong-Nam | 1500 m | 2:05.59 | 26 |
| Lee Kyeong-Nam | 3000 m | 4:21.10 | 20 |
