= South Korea at the 1984 Winter Olympics =

- IOC code: KOR
- NOC: Korean Olympic Committee
- Website: www.sports.or.kr (in Korean and English)

in Sarajevo
- Competitors: 15 in 5 sports
- Officials: 8
- Medals: Gold 0 Silver 0 Bronze 0 Total 0

Winter Olympics appearances (overview)
- 1948; 1952; 1956; 1960; 1964; 1968; 1972; 1976; 1980; 1984; 1988; 1992; 1994; 1998; 2002; 2006; 2010; 2014; 2018; 2022; 2026

Other related appearances
- Korea (2018)

South Korea, as Republic of Korea, competed at the 1984 Winter Olympics in Sarajevo, Yugoslavia.

== Alpine skiing ==
Men

Athlete	Event	Record	Rank
Park Byung-ro	Downhill	1:59.74	52
Park Byung-ro	Giant slalom	Disqualified	–
Park Byung-ro	Slalom	Did not finish	–
Kim Jin-hae	Downhill	2:01.96	57
Kim Jin-hae	Giant slalom	Disqualified	–
Kim Jin-hae	Slalom	2:17.45	31
Yoo Woo-youn	Downhill	2:02.67	58
Yoo Woo-youn	Giant slalom	Disqualified	–
Yoo Woo-youn	Slalom	2:21.45	35

== Biathlon ==
Men

Athlete	Event	Record	Penalty	Rank
Hwang Byung-dae	10 km	44:43.2	6	62
Hwang Byung-dae	20 km	1:49:49.9	15	60

== Cross-country skiing ==
Men

Athlete	Event	Record	Rank
Park Ki-ho	15 km	48:55.6	62
Park Ki-ho	30 km	1.45:41.9	60
Kim Bo-nam	15 km	52:04.4	72
Cho Sung-hoon	15 km	DNQ	–
Cho Sung-hoon	30 km	1.50:32.1	67

== Figure skating ==
Men

Athlete	Event	Factored places	Rank
Cho Jae-hyung	Single	46.0	23

Women

Athlete	Event	Factored places	Rank
Kim Hae-sung	Single	45.4	23

== Speed skating ==
Men

Athlete	Event	Record	Rank
Lee Young-ha	500 m	39.90	28
Lee Young-ha	1000 m	1:19.55	28
Lee Young-ha	1500 m	2:02.45	23
Lee Young-ha	5000 m	7:39.17	27
Lee Young-ha	10000 m	15:34.48	27
Na Yoon-soo	500 m	40.35	31
Na Yoon-soo	1000 m	1:19.94	30
Na Yoon-soo	1500 m	2:03.90	30
Na Yoon-soo	5000 m	7:42.45	30
Bae Ki-tae	1500 m	2:04.18	32
Bae Ki-tae	5000 m	7:50.82	39

Women

Athlete	Event	Record	Rank
Lee Yeon-ju	500 m	43.75	23
Lee Yeon-ju	1000 m	1:29.80	31
Lee Yeon-ju	1500 m	2:18.34	28
Choi Seung-yun	500 m	44.79	29
Choi Seung-yun	1000 m	1:32.31	35
Choi Seung-yun	1500 m	2:17.80	26
Lee Kyung-ja	1000 m	1:31.11	34
Lee Kyung-ja	1500 m	2:17.96	27
Lee Kyung-ja	3000 m	5:07.12	24
