= South Korea at the 1976 Winter Olympics =

- IOC code: KOR
- NOC: Korean Olympic Committee
- Website: www.sports.or.kr (in Korean and English)

in Innsbruck
- Competitors: 3 in 2 sports
- Officials: 11
- Medals: Gold 0 Silver 0 Bronze 0 Total 0

Winter Olympics appearances (overview)
- 1948; 1952; 1956; 1960; 1964; 1968; 1972; 1976; 1980; 1984; 1988; 1992; 1994; 1998; 2002; 2006; 2010; 2014; 2018; 2022; 2026

Other related appearances
- Korea (2018)

South Korea, as Republic of Korea, competed at the 1976 Winter Olympics in Innsbruck, Austria.

== Figure skating ==
Women

Athlete	Event	Points	Places	Rank
Yoon Hyo-Jin	Single	159.64	158	17

== Speed skating ==
Men

Athlete	Event	Record	Rank
Lee Young-Ha	500m	41.08	22
Lee Young-Ha	1000m	1:22.88	15
Lee Young-Ha	1500m	2:05.25	18
Lee Young-Ha	5000m	7:44.21	11

Women

Athlete	Event	Record	Rank
Lee Nam-Soon	500m	46.33	25
Lee Nam-Soon	1000m	1:35.58	25
Lee Nam-Soon	1500m	2:26.24	25
Lee Nam-Soon	3000m	5:08.34	24
