= Lee Eun-hee =

Lee Eun-hee may refer to:

- Lee Eun-hee (judoka)
- Lee Eun-hee (figure skater)
- Lee Eun-hee (table tennis)
- Lee Eun-hee (swimmer)
