= South Korea at the 1948 Winter Olympics =

- IOC code: KOR
- NOC: Korean Olympic Committee
- Website: www.sports.or.kr (in Korean and English)

in St. Moritz
- Competitors: 3 in 1 sport
- Officials: 2
- Medals: Gold 0 Silver 0 Bronze 0 Total 0

Winter Olympics appearances (overview)
- 1948; 1952; 1956; 1960; 1964; 1968; 1972; 1976; 1980; 1984; 1988; 1992; 1994; 1998; 2002; 2006; 2010; 2014; 2018; 2022; 2026

Other related appearances
- Korea (2018)

Southern Korea, as Korea, competed in the Winter Olympic Games for the first time as an independent nation at the 1948 Winter Olympics in St. Moritz, Switzerland.

== Speed skating ==
Athlete	Event	Record	Rank
Choi Yong-Jin	500m	45.7	T21
Choi Yong-Jin	1500m	2:29.8	31
Lee Chong-Kook	1500m	2:30.9	T36
Lee Chong-Kook	5000m	9:36.7	38
Lee Hyo-Chang	500m	45.9	T23
Lee Hyo-Chang	1500m	2:23.3	19
Lee Hyo-Chang	5000m	9:05.4	25
