= Kim Ha-yun =

Kim Ha-yun may refer to:

- Kim Ha-yun (skier)
- Kim Ha-yun (judoka)
