= South Korea at the 2002 Winter Olympics =

- IOC code: KOR
- NOC: Korean Olympic Committee
- Website: www.sports.or.kr (in Korean and English)

in Salt Lake City
- Competitors: 48 in 9 sports
- Flag bearer: Hur Seung-Wook
- Officials: 27
- Medals Ranked 14th: Gold 2 Silver 2 Bronze 0 Total 4

Winter Olympics appearances (overview)
- 1948; 1952; 1956; 1960; 1964; 1968; 1972; 1976; 1980; 1984; 1988; 1992; 1994; 1998; 2002; 2006; 2010; 2014; 2018; 2022; 2026

Other related appearances
- Korea (2018)

South Korea, as Republic of Korea, competed at the 2002 Winter Olympics in Salt Lake City, United States.

== Medalists ==
Medal	Name	Sport	Event
Gold	Ko Gi-Hyun	Short track speed skating	Women's 1500 metres
Gold	Choi Min-Kyung; Joo Min-Jin; Park Hye-Won; Choi Eun-Kyung	Short track speed skating	Women's 3000 metre relay
Silver	Ko Gi-Hyun	Short track speed skating	Women's 1000 metres
Silver	Choi Eun-Kyung	Short track speed skating	Women's 1500 metres

== Alpine skiing ==
Men

Athlete	Event	Final				
Athlete	Event	Run 1	Run 2	Run 3	Total	Rank
Byun Jong Moon	Men's slalom	58.38	1:03.20	n/a	2:01.58	31
Byun Jong Moon	Men's giant slalom	1:19.49	1:17.71	n/a	2:37.20	47
Kang Min Heuk	Men's slalom	58.01	1:00.47	n/a	1:58.48	30
Kang Min Heuk	Men's giant slalom	1:19.11	1:17.99	n/a	2:37.10	46
Hur Seung Wook	Men's slalom	56.70	DQ	n/a	Did not finish	
Hur Seung Wook	Men's giant slalom	1:19.32	DNF	n/a	Did not finish	
Lee Ki-hyun	Men's slalom	DNF	–	n/a	Did not finish	

Women

Athlete	Event	Final				
Athlete	Event	Run 1	Run 2	Run 3	Total	Rank
Yoo Hye Min	Women's giant slalom	DNF	n/a	Did not finish		

== Biathlon ==
Men

Athlete	Event	Record	Penalty	Rank
Shin Byung-Kook	10 km	29:51.1	2	80
Shin Byung-Kook	20 km	1:00:58.1	4	75

Women

Athlete	Event	Record	Penalty	Rank
Kim Ja-Youn	7.5 km sprint	26:45.2	3	69
Kim Ja-Youn	15 km	1:01:13.8	7	66

== Cross-country skiing ==
Men

Athlete	Event	Record	Rank
Park Byeong-ju	10 km classical	30:15.6	69
Park Byeong-ju	15 km	45:51.4	62
Park Byeong-ju	30 km	1:20:57.5	57
Shin Doo-Sun	10 km classical	29:54.5	65
Shin Doo-Sun	30 km	1:23:03.0	61
Shin Doo-Sun	Sprint	3:11.89	57
Jung Eui-Myung	10 km classical	32:15.1	76
Jung Eui-Myung	30 km	Did Not Finish	-
Choi Im-Hun	15 km	46:13.3	64

Women

Athlete	Event	Record	Rank
Lee Chae-Won	Sprint	3:41.06	52
Lee Chae-Won	5 km classical	16:13.1	68
Lee Chae-Won	10 km	34:04.1	56
Lee Chae-Won	15 km	45:37.9	47

== Figure skating ==
Men

Athlete	Event	Short Program	Free Skating	Rank
Lee Kyu-Hyun	Single	28th	Final not Reached	28th

Women

Athlete	Event	Short Program	Free Skating	Rank
Park Bit-Na	Single	26th	Final not Reached	26th

Mixed

Athlete	Event	TFP	Rank
Yang Tae-Hwa; Lee Chuen-Gun	Ice Dancing	48.0	24th

== Luge ==
Men

Athlete	Event	Record	Rank
Lee Hak-Jin	Single	3:07.199	36
Kim Min-Kyu	Single	3:13.805	42
Lee Chang-yong	Single	Did Not Finish	-

== Short track speed skating ==
Men

Athlete	Event	Heats		Quarterfinals		Semifinals		Final	
Athlete	Event	Time	Rank	Time	Rank	Time	Rank	Time	Rank
Kim Dong-Sung	500 metres	42.834	1st	41.806	1st	41.990	3rd	42.076	6th
Kim Dong-Sung	1000 metres	1:32.901	1st	1:27.429	1st	1:52.645	4th	1:35.582	5th
Kim Dong-Sung	1500 metres	2:22.133	1st			2:15.942	1st	Disqualified	12th
Lee Seung-Jae	500 metres	Disqualified	-	Did Not Advance					
Ahn Hyun-Soo	1000 metres	1:30.252	1st	1:27.201	2nd	1:27.469	2nd	1:32.519	4th
Ahn Hyun-Soo	1500 metres	2:23.287	1st			Disqualified	-	Did Not Advance	13th
Kim Dong-Sung; Lee Seung-Jae; Min Ryoung; Oh Se-Jong	5000 metres Relay					Disqualified	-	Did Not Advance	8th

Women

Athlete	Event	Heats		Quarterfinals		Semifinals		Final	
Athlete	Event	Time	Rank	Time	Rank	Time	Rank	Time	Rank
Joo Min-Jin	500 metres	45.547	1st	44.992	2nd	1:08.184	4th	46.893	9th
Choi Eun-Kyung	500 metres	45.395	1st	44.846	1st	44.647	5th	45.383	7th
Choi Eun-Kyung	1000 metres	1:37.609	1st	1:34.842	1st	1:38.523	4th	1:34.808	6th
Choi Eun-Kyung	1500 metres	2:29.460	1st			2:21.069	1st	2:31.610	2nd place, silver medalist(s)
Ko Gi-Hyun	1000 metres	1:42.093	1st	1:31.349	2nd	1:35.172	2nd	1:36.427	2nd place, silver medalist(s)
Ko Gi-Hyun	1500 metres	2:26.980	1st			2:31.120	2nd	2:31.581	1st place, gold medalist(s)
Joo Min-Jin; Choi Eun-Kyung; Choi Min-Kyung; Park Hye-Won	3000 metres Relay					4:14.977	1st	4:12.793	1st place, gold medalist(s)

== Skeleton ==
Men

Athlete	Run 1	Run 2	Total	Rank
Kang Kwang-Bae	52.11	52.40	1:44.51	20

== Ski jumping ==
Men

Athlete	Event	Qualification Point	Final Point	Rank
Choi Heung-Chul	K90 Individual	105.5	216.0	30
Choi Heung-Chul	K120 Individual	73.1	Did not qualify	41
Kim Hyun-Ki	K90 Individual	106.5	106.0	36
Kim Hyun-Ki	K120 Individual	102.7	108.5	31
Kang Chil-Gu	K90 Individual	101.5	96.0	46
Kang Chil-Gu	K120 Individual	81.0	83.2	47
Choi Yong-Jik	K90 Individual	111.0	109.0	34
Choi Yong-Jik	K120 Individual	85.8	86.7	46
Choi Heung-Chul; Kim Hyun-Ki; Kang Chil-Gu; Choi Yong-Jik	K120 Team		801.6	8

== Speed skating ==
Men

Athlete	Event	Record	Rank
Lee Kyu-Hyuk	500 m	1:09.59	5
Lee Kyu-Hyuk	1000 m	1:08.37	8
Lee Kyu-Hyuk	1500 m	1:45.82	8
Choi Jae-Bong	500 m	1:10.57	17
Choi Jae-Bong	1000 m	1:08.81	12
Choi Jae-Bong	1500 m	1:47.26	21
Park Jae-Man	500 m	1:11.96	25
Park Jae-Man	1000 m	1:10.67	32
Kim Chul-Soo	500 m	1:48.46	33
Kim Chul-Soo	1000 m	1:09.79	25
Mun Jun	1500 m	1:48.58	33
Yeo Sang-Yeop	1500 m	1:50.70	42
Lee Seung-Hwan	5000 m	6:37.67	28

Women

Athlete	Event	Record	Rank
Choi Seung-yong	500 m	1:17.14	18
Choi Seung-yong	1000 m	1:18.88	32
Jo Seon-Yeon	500 m	1:18.79	25
Jo Seon-Yeon	1000 m	1:18.36	29
Lee Yong-Ju	500 m	1:19.78	29
Lee Yong-Ju	1000 m	1:18.79	31
Baek Eun-Bi	1500 m	2:03.87	33
Baek Eun-Bi	3000 m	4:18.15	25
Choi Yoon-Sook	1500 m	2:01.39	T29
