= South Korea at the 1968 Winter Olympics =

- IOC code: KOR
- NOC: Korean Olympic Committee
- Website: www.sports.or.kr (in Korean and English)

in Grenoble
- Competitors: 8 (6 men, 2 women) in 4 sports
- Officials: 7
- Medals: Gold 0 Silver 0 Bronze 0 Total 0

Winter Olympics appearances (overview)
- 1948; 1952; 1956; 1960; 1964; 1968; 1972; 1976; 1980; 1984; 1988; 1992; 1994; 1998; 2002; 2006; 2010; 2014; 2018; 2022; 2026

Other related appearances
- Korea (2018)

South Korea, as Republic of Korea, competed at the 1968 Winter Olympics in Grenoble, France. It consists of 2 women & 6 men.

== Alpine skiing ==
Men

Athlete	Event	Race 1		Race 2		Total	
Athlete	Event	Time	Rank	Time	Rank	Time	Rank
Uoe Jae-Sik	Giant Slalom	2:45.53	92	2:21:45	83	5:06:98	88

Men's slalom

Athlete	Heat 1		Heat 2		Final					
Athlete	Time	Rank	Time	Rank	Time 1	Rank	Time 2	Rank	Total	Rank
Uoe Jae-Sik	DSQ	–	DSQ	–	did not advance					

== Cross-country skiing ==
Men

Event	Athlete	Race	
Event	Athlete	Time	Rank
15 km	Choon-Kie Kim	1'00:04.8	66
15 km	Chong-Ihm Yoon	58:28.2	62
30 km	Choon-Kie Kim	2'11:51.3	63
30 km	Chong-Ihm Yoon	DNF	–
50 km	Choon-Kie Kim	DNS	–
50 km	Chong-Ihm Yoon	3'27:22.5	47

== Figure skating ==
Men

Athlete	CF	FS	Points	Places	Rank
Lee Kwang-Young	28	28	1360.3	250	28

Women

Athlete	CF	FS	Points	Places	Rank
Hyun-Joo Lee	30	30	1359.9	271	30
Hae-Kyung Kim	32	31	1336.2	277	31

== Speed skating ==
Men

Athlete	Event	Record	Rank
Lee Ik-Hwan	1500m	2:17.5	51
Lee Ik-Hwan	5000m	8:28.2	38

Women

Athlete	Event	Record	Rank
Kim Kui-Chin	1500m	2.36.7	27
Kim Kui-Chin	3000m	5.29.5	T22
