= South Korea at the 2014 Winter Olympics =

- IOC code: KOR
- NOC: Korean Olympic Committee
- Website: www.sports.or.kr (in Korean and English)

in Sochi
- Competitors: 71 in 13 sports
- Flag bearers: Lee Kyou-hyuk (opening and closing)
- Medals Ranked 13th: Gold 3 Silver 3 Bronze 2 Total 8

Winter Olympics appearances (overview)
- 1948; 1952; 1956; 1960; 1964; 1968; 1972; 1976; 1980; 1984; 1988; 1992; 1994; 1998; 2002; 2006; 2010; 2014; 2018; 2022; 2026

Other related appearances
- Korea (2018)

South Korea competed at the 2014 Winter Olympics in Sochi, Russia from 7 to 23 February 2014. The team consisted of 71 athletes and 49 officials. This marks an increase of 25 athletes from four years prior. Originally 64 athletes were named to the team but reallocations brought the final team size to 71 athletes.

The 2014 Games marked the first time a South Korean Olympic team competed in Russia, as South Korea and 64 western countries did not take part at the American-led boycott in the 1980 Summer Olympics held in Moscow due to the Soviet–Afghan War.

South Korea left Sochi with a total of 8 medals (3 gold, 3 silver, and 2 bronze), its lowest total at the Winter Olympics since 2002; female athletes won seven of these medals. With Pyeongchang being the host city of the 2018 Winter Olympics, a Korean segment was performed at the closing ceremony.

== Medalists ==
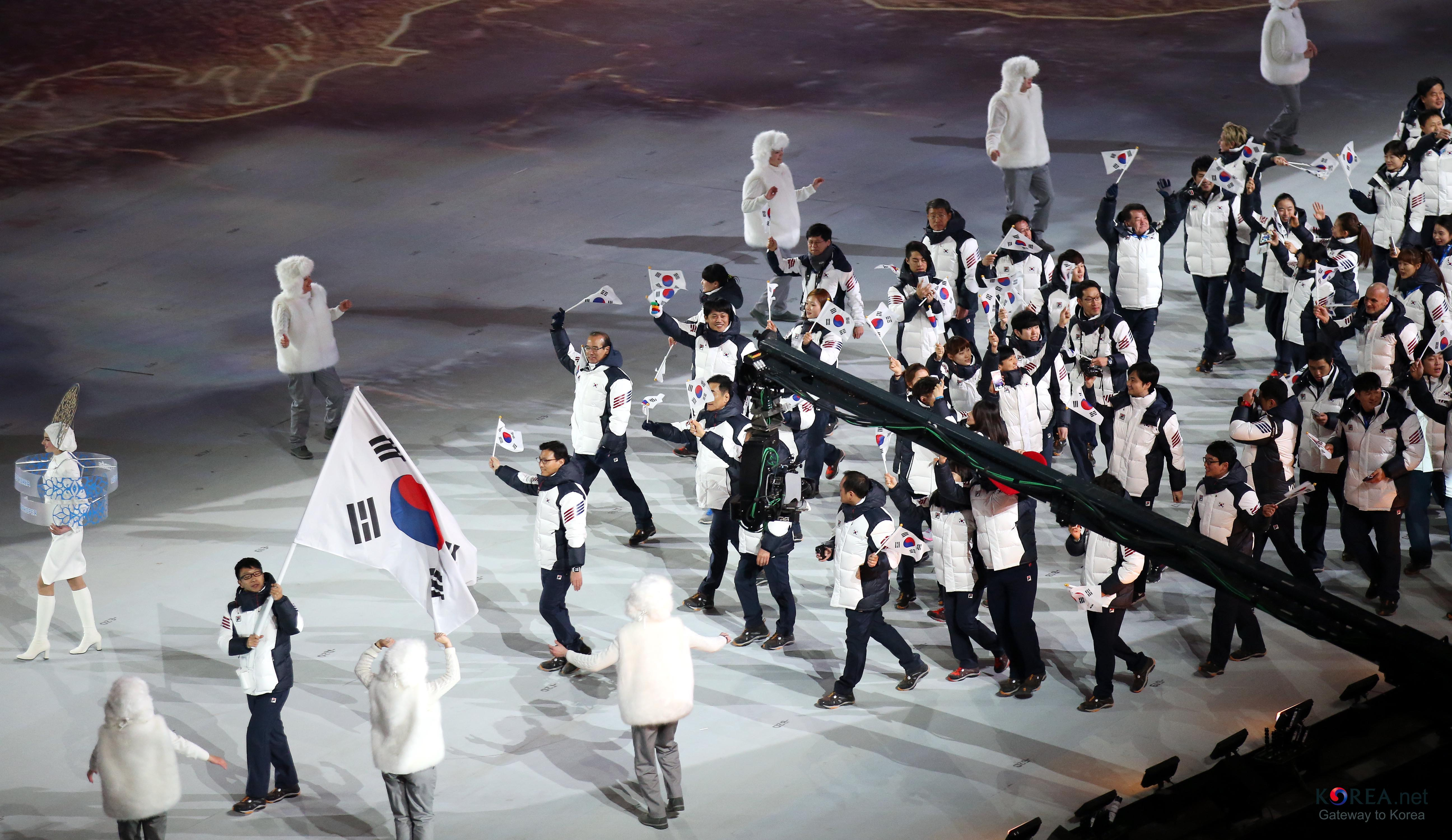
The South Korean delegation on parade at the opening ceremony

Medal	Name	Sport	Event	Date
Gold	Lee Sang-hwa	Speed skating	Women's 500 metres	11 February
Gold	Cho Ha-ri; Kim A-lang; Kong Sang-jeong; Park Seung-hi; Shim Suk-hee	Short track speed skating	Women's 3000 metre relay	18 February
Gold	Park Seung-hi	Short track speed skating	Women's 1000 metres	21 February
Silver	Shim Suk-hee	Short track speed skating	Women's 1500 metres	15 February
Silver	Yuna Kim	Figure skating	Ladies' singles	20 February
Silver	Joo Hyong-jun; Kim Cheol-min; Lee Seung-hoon	Speed skating	Men's team pursuit	22 February
Bronze	Park Seung-hi	Short track speed skating	Women's 500 metres	13 February
Bronze	Shim Suk-hee	Short track speed skating	Women's 1000 metres	21 February

== Alpine skiing ==
According to the quota allocation released on 27 January 2014, South Korea has qualified a total quota of five athletes in alpine skiing.

Athlete	Event	Run 1		Run 2		Total	
Athlete	Event	Time	Rank	Time	Rank	Time	Rank
Jung Dong-hyun	Men's giant slalom	1:26.72	44	1:28.54	41	2:55.26	41
Jung Dong-hyun	Men's slalom	DNF					
Kyung Sung-hyun	Men's giant slalom	1:34.03	66	1:41.17	70	3:15.20	66
Kyung Sung-hyun	Men's slalom	DNF					
Park Je-yun	Men's giant slalom	DNF					
Park Je-yun	Men's slalom	DNF					
Gim So-hui	Women's giant slalom	1:31.47	59	1:30.36	52	3:01.83	53
Gim So-hui	Women's slalom	DNF					
Kang Young-seo	Women's slalom	1:18.84	59	1:17.61	49	2:36.45	49

== Biathlon ==
Based on their performance at the 2012 and 2013 Biathlon World Championships South Korea qualified 1 man and 1 woman.

Athlete	Event	Time	Misses	Rank
Lee In-bok	Men's sprint	28:35.9	1 (0+1)	82
Lee In-bok	Men's individual	57:29.0	1 (0+1+0+0)	73
Mun Ji-hee	Women's sprint	24:32.0	1 (0+1)	74
Mun Ji-hee	Women's individual	54:06.7	3 (0+0+2+1)	69

== Bobsleigh ==
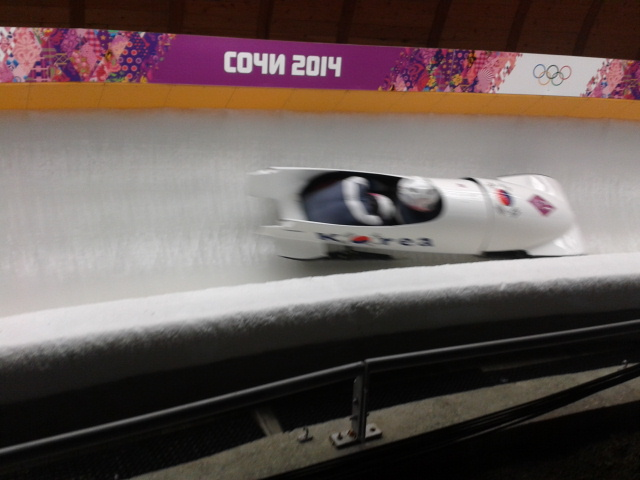
Two-man

Athlete	Event	Run 1		Run 2		Run 3		Run 4		Total	
Athlete	Event	Time	Rank	Time	Rank	Time	Rank	Time	Rank	Time	Rank
Kim Dong-hyun*; Jun Jung-lin	Two-man	57.78	25	57.76	24	57.73	24	Did not advance		2:53.27	25
Seo Young-woo; Won Yun-jong*	Two-man	57.41	18	57.20	18	57.58	21	57.08	=16	3:49.27	18
Jun Jung-lin; Seo Young-woo; Suk Young-jin; Won Yun-jong*	Four-man	55.82	21	55.97	20	56.25	22	55.88	=17	3:44.22	20
Kim Dong-hyun*; Kim Kyung-hyun; Kim Sik; Oh Jea-han	Four-man	56.98	30	56.77	29	56.89	29	Did not advance		2:50.64	28
Kim Sun-ok; Shin Mi-hwa	Two-woman	1:00.09	19	1:00.02	18	1:00.44	18	1:00.26	18	4:00.81	18

* – Denotes the driver of each sled

== Cross-country skiing ==
According to the quota allocation released on 27 January 2014, South Korea has qualified a total quota of two athletes, each of them will compete only in classical events.

Athlete	Event	Classical		Freestyle		Final		
Athlete	Event	Time	Rank	Time	Rank	Time	Deficit	Rank
Hwang Jun-ho	Men's 15 km classical	—N/a				44:34.8	+6:05.1	68
Hwang Jun-ho	Men's 30 km skiathlon	41:22.6	67	LAP	68	LAP		68
Lee Chae-won	Women's 10 km classical	—N/a				32:16.9	+3:59.1	48
Lee Chae-won	Women's 15 km skiathlon	22:41.1	59	20:51.3	41	44:17.2	+5:43.6	54
Lee Chae-won	Women's 30 km freestyle	—N/a				1:16:38.2	+5:33.0	36

== Curling ==
Based on results from 2012 World Women's Curling Championship and the 2013 World Women's Curling Championship, South Korea has qualified their women's team as one of the seven highest ranked nations.

- Women's Event – 1 team of 5 athletes
- Kim Ji-sun
- Lee Seul-bee
- Shin Mi-sung
- Gim Un-chi
- Um Min-ji

Final round robin standings
Team	Skip	Pld	W	L	PF	PA	EW	EL	BE	SE	S%	Qualification
Canada	Jennifer Jones	9	9	0	72	40	43	27	12	14	86%	Playoffs
Sweden	Margaretha Sigfridsson	9	7	2	58	52	37	35	13	7	80%	Playoffs
Switzerland	Mirjam Ott	9	5	4	63	60	37	38	13	7	78%	Playoffs
Great Britain	Eve Muirhead	9	5	4	74	58	39	35	9	11	80%	Playoffs
Japan	Ayumi Ogasawara	9	4	5	59	67	39	41	4	10	76%	
Denmark	Lene Nielsen	9	4	5	57	56	34	40	12	9	78%	
China	Wang Bingyu	9	4	5	58	62	36	38	10	4	81%	
South Korea	Kim Ji-sun	9	3	6	60	65	35	37	10	6	79%	
Russia	Anna Sidorova	9	3	6	48	56	33	35	19	6	82%	
United States	Erika Brown	9	1	8	42	75	33	40	8	5	76%	

Round-robin

South Korea has a bye in draws 1, 5 and 9.

Draw 2

Monday, February 11, 9:00

Sheet D	1	2	3	4	5	6	7	8	9	10	Final
South Korea (Kim)	0	2	0	2	0	3	0	2	1	2	12
Japan (Ogasawara) 🔨	2	0	1	0	2	0	2	0	0	0	7

Draw 3

Tuesday, February 11, 19:00

Sheet B	1	2	3	4	5	6	7	8	9	10	Final
South Korea (Kim) 🔨	0	1	0	1	0	0	2	0	2	0	6
Switzerland (Ott)	0	0	0	0	2	3	0	2	0	1	8

Draw 4

Wednesday, February 12, 14:00

Sheet C	1	2	3	4	5	6	7	8	9	10	Final
South Korea (Kim) 🔨	0	1	0	1	0	1	0	0	1	X	4
Sweden (Sigfridsson)	0	0	1	0	3	0	1	2	0	X	7

Draw 6

Thursday, February 13, 19:00

Sheet B	1	2	3	4	5	6	7	8	9	10	Final
Russia (Sidorova) 🔨	1	0	1	0	1	0	0	1	0	X	4
South Korea (Kim)	0	2	0	2	0	0	3	0	1	X	8

Draw 7

Friday, February 14, 14:00

Sheet A	1	2	3	4	5	6	7	8	9	10	Final
South Korea (Kim)	0	0	2	0	0	1	0	0	X	X	3
China (Wang) 🔨	0	3	0	0	3	0	3	2	X	X	11

Draw 8

Saturday, February 15, 9:00

Sheet D	1	2	3	4	5	6	7	8	9	10	Final
Great Britain (Muirhead)	0	3	0	1	1	0	2	0	0	3	10
South Korea (Kim) 🔨	2	0	0	0	0	2	0	2	2	0	8

Draw 10

Sunday, February 16, 14:00

Sheet A	1	2	3	4	5	6	7	8	9	10	Final
Denmark (Nielsen)	0	0	0	1	0	2	3	0	1	0	7
South Korea (Kim) 🔨	0	1	0	0	1	0	0	1	0	1	4

Draw 11

Monday, February 17, 9:00

Sheet B	1	2	3	4	5	6	7	8	9	10	Final
South Korea (Kim) 🔨	4	1	0	2	2	0	2	X	X	X	11
United States (Brown)	0	0	1	0	0	1	0	X	X	X	2

Draw 12

Monday, February 17, 19:00

Sheet C	1	2	3	4	5	6	7	8	9	10	Final
Canada (Jones)	0	1	0	2	1	0	1	2	2	X	9
South Korea (Kim) 🔨	2	0	2	0	0	0	0	0	0	X	4

== Figure skating ==
South Korea has achieved the following quota places: Three athletes were named to the team.

Athlete	Event	SP		FS		Total	
Athlete	Event	Points	Rank	Points	Rank	Points	Rank
Kim Hae-jin	Ladies' singles	54.37	18 Q	95.11	17	149.48	16
Yuna Kim	Ladies' singles	74.92	1 Q	144.19	2	219.11	2nd place, silver medalist(s)
Park So-youn	Ladies' singles	49.14	23 Q	93.83	19	142.97	21

== Freestyle skiing ==
Halfpipe

Athlete	Event	Qualification				Final			
Athlete	Event	Run 1	Run 2	Best	Rank	Run 1	Run 2	Best	Rank
Kim Kwang-jin	Men's halfpipe	45.40	34.40	45.40	25	Did not advance			
Park Hee-jin	Women's halfpipe	42.40	20.40	42.40	21	Did not advance			

Moguls

Athlete	Event	Qualification								Final											
Athlete	Event	Run 1				Run 2				Run 1				Run 2				Run 3			
Athlete	Event	Time	Points	Total	Rank	Time	Points	Total	Rank	Time	Points	Total	Rank	Time	Points	Total	Rank	Time	Points	Total	Rank
Choi Jae-woo	Men's moguls	24.61	14.16	20.56	15	26.08	16.2	21.9	2 Q	25.27	16.03	22.11	10 Q	DNF				Did not advance			
Seo Jee-won	Women's moguls	33.49	11.30	15.95	24	33.02	10.56	15.4	13	Did not advance											
Seo Jung-hwa	Women's moguls	DNS				33.56	9.54	14.16	14	Did not advance											

== Luge ==
Based on their performance at the 2013–14 Luge World Cup, South Korea has achieved a total quota of four athletes and a spot in the mixed team relay due to allocation.

Athlete	Event	Run 1		Run 2		Run 3		Run 4		Total	
Athlete	Event	Time	Rank	Time	Rank	Time	Rank	Time	Rank	Time	Rank
Kim Dong-hyeon	Men's singles	54.207	36	54.603	36	53.795	34	53.780	37	3:36.385	35
Cho Jung-myung; Park Jin-yong	Men's doubles	51.643	18	51.475	17	—N/a				1:43.118	18
Sung Eun-ryung	Women's singles	52.173	30	51.960	31	52.486	31	52.124	29	3:28.743	29
Cho Jung-myung; Kim Dong-hyeon; Park Jin-yong; Sung Eun-ryung	Mixed team relay	56.174	12	57.986	12	58.469	11	—N/a		2:52.629	12

== Short track speed skating ==
Based on their performance at the two World Cup events in November 2013 South Korea qualified a full team of 5 men and 5 women.

Noh Jin-kyu qualified for the team but broke his elbow on 14 January 2014 and will miss the Olympics. His replacement was named as Lee Ho-suk. Due to a conflict with or lack of support from the South Korean coaches and national short-track administrators, Ahn Hyun-soo, one of South Korea's best skaters, left the Korean team and competed for Russia in these Olympics. He defeated the Korean skaters in all four short track events and the Korean men were completely shut out of medals in these Olympics.

Men

Athlete	Event	Heat		Quarterfinal		Semifinal		Final	
Athlete	Event	Time	Rank	Time	Rank	Time	Rank	Time	Rank
Sin Da-woon	1000 m	1:25.893	2 Q	1:24.215	1 Q	1:25.564	2 FA	PEN	7
Sin Da-woon	1500 m	2:15.530	1 Q	—N/a		2:52.061	4 FB	2:22.066	10
Lee Han-bin	500 m	41.982	2 Q	41.471	3	Did not advance			11
Lee Han-bin	1000 m	1:26.502	1 Q	1:24.444	1 Q	PEN		Did not advance	8
Lee Han-bin	1500 m	2:16.412	1 Q	—N/a		3:11.810	5 AA	2:16.466	6
Park Se-yeong	500 m	41.566	1 Q	PEN		Did not advance			14
Park Se-yeong	1500 m	2:21.087	3 Q	—N/a		2:16.241	3 FB	PEN	13
Lee Han-bin; Lee Ho-suk; Kim Yun-jae; Park Se-yeong; Sin Da-woon	5000 m relay	—N/a				6:48.206	3 FB	6:43.921	7

Women

Athlete	Event	Heat		Quarterfinal		Semifinal		Final	
Athlete	Event	Time	Rank	Time	Rank	Time	Rank	Time	Rank
Cho Ha-ri	1500 m	2:27.629	1 Q	—N/a		PEN		Did not advance	19
Kim A-lang	500 m	43.919	2 Q	43.673	3	Did not advance			10
Kim A-lang	1000 m	1:31.640	1 Q	1:32.154	3	Did not advance			10
Kim A-lang	1500 m	2:22.864	2 Q	—N/a		2:22.928	2 FA	PEN	13
Park Seung-hi	500 m	44.18	1 Q	43.392	1 Q	43.611	1 FA	54.207	3rd place, bronze medalist(s)
Park Seung-hi	1000 m	1:31.883	1 Q	1:30.801	2 Q	1:30.182	1 FA	1:30.761	1st place, gold medalist(s)
Shim Suk-hee	500 m	44.197	2 Q	43.572	4	Did not advance			14
Shim Suk-hee	1000 m	1:31.046	1 Q	1:29.356	1 Q	1:31.237	1 FA	1:31.027	3rd place, bronze medalist(s)
Shim Suk-hee	1500 m	2:24.765	1 Q	—N/a		2:18.966	2 FA	2:19.239	2nd place, silver medalist(s)
Cho Ha-ri; Kim A-lang; Kong Sang-jeong; Park Seung-hi; Shim Suk-hee	3000 m relay	—N/a				4:08.052	1 FA	4:09.498	1st place, gold medalist(s)

Qualification legend: ADV – Advanced due to being impeded by another skater; FA – Qualify to medal round; FB – Qualify to consolation round; AA – Advance to medal round due to being impeded by another skater

== Skeleton ==
South Korea has qualified two spots in the men's event for the first time in history on its fourth consecutive Olympics.

Athlete	Event	Run 1		Run 2		Run 3		Run 4		Total	
Athlete	Event	Time	Rank	Time	Rank	Time	Rank	Time	Rank	Time	Rank
Lee Han-sin	Men's	58.41	25	58.12	22	58.64	24	Did not advance		2:55.17	24
Yun Sung-bin	Men's	57.54	15	57.02	9	57.90	20	57.11	15	3:49.57	16

== Ski jumping ==
South Korea has received the following start quotas:

Athlete	Event	Qualification			First round			Final			Total	
Athlete	Event	Distance	Points	Rank	Distance	Points	Rank	Distance	Points	Rank	Points	Rank
Choi Heung-chul	Men's normal hill	90.0	105.9	34 Q	95.0	109.1	42	Did not advance				
Choi Heung-chul	Men's large hill	116.0	88.6	37 Q	121.5	99.0	44	Did not advance				
Choi Seo-woo	Men's normal hill	96.5	113.7	18 Q	95.0	116.2	33	Did not advance				
Choi Seo-woo	Men's large hill	117.0	97.7	29 Q	122.0	106.4	39	Did not advance				
Kang Chil-ku	Men's normal hill	89.0	99.3	42	Did not advance							
Kang Chil-ku	Men's large hill	104.5	78.8	45	Did not advance							
Kim Hyun-ki	Men's normal hill	96.0	114.4	16 Q	92.5	109.2	41	Did not advance				
Kim Hyun-ki	Men's large hill	111.0	80.3	44	Did not advance							
Choi Heung-chul; Choi Seo-woo; Kang Chil-ku; Kim Hyun-ki	Men's team large hill	—N/a			476.5	402.0	11	Did not advance				

== Snowboarding ==
Alpine

Athlete	Event	Qualification		Round of 16	Quarterfinal	Semifinal	Final	
Athlete	Event	Time	Rank	Opposition Time	Opposition Time	Opposition Time	Opposition Time	Rank
Kim Sang-kyum	Men's giant slalom	1:40.27	17	Did not advance				
Kim Sang-kyum	Men's slalom	1:02.35	26	Did not advance				
Shin Bong-shik	Men's giant slalom	1:43.43	26	Did not advance				
Shin Bong-shik	Men's slalom	1:00.32	23	Did not advance				

Freestyle

Athlete	Event	Qualification				Semifinal				Final			
Athlete	Event	Run 1	Run 2	Best	Rank	Run 1	Run 2	Best	Rank	Run 1	Run 2	Best	Rank
Kim Ho-jun	Men's halfpipe	61.75	20.00	61.75	14	Did not advance							
Lee Kwang-ki	Men's halfpipe	27.00	69.50	69.50	11	Did not advance							

Qualification Legend: QF – Qualify directly to final; QS – Qualify to semifinal

== Speed skating ==
Based on the results from the fall World Cups during the 2013–14 ISU Speed Skating World Cup season, South Korea has earned the following start quotas:

On 11 February 2014, Lee Sang-hwa won the gold medal for the women's 500m longtrack speedskating race, having previously won the one at the 2010 Games. She became the first woman since Catriona Le May Doan at the 2002 Games to defend her gold at the event. She became the third woman to win back-to-back golds at the 500m, and hence the first Korean woman to do so.

Men

Athlete	Event	Race 1		Race 2		Final	
Athlete	Event	Time	Rank	Time	Rank	Time	Rank
Joo Hyong-jun	1500 m	—N/a				1:48.59	29
Kim Cheol-min	5000 m	—N/a				6:37.28	24
Kim Jun-ho	500 m	35.43	25	35.42	21	70.85	21
Kim Tae-yun	1000 m	—N/a				1:10.81	30
Lee Kang-seok	500 m	35.45	26	35.42	22	70.87	22
Lee Kyou-hyuk	500 m	35.16	12	35.48	23	70.65	18
Lee Kyou-hyuk	1000 m	—N/a				1:10.04	21
Lee Seung-hoon	5000 m	—N/a				6:25.61	12
Lee Seung-hoon	10000 m	—N/a				13:11.68	4
Mo Tae-bum	500 m	34.84	4	34.84	5	69.68	4
Mo Tae-bum	1000 m	—N/a				1:09.37	12

Women

Athlete	Event	Race 1		Race 2		Final	
Athlete	Event	Time	Rank	Time	Rank	Time	Rank
Kim Bo-reum	1500 m	—N/a				1:59.78	21
Kim Bo-reum	3000 m	—N/a				4:12.08	13
Kim Hyun-yung	500 m	39.19	24	39.04	24	78.23	24
Kim Hyun-yung	1000 m	—N/a				1:18.10	28
Lee Bo-ra	500 m	38.93	20	38.82	21	77.75	20
Lee Bo-ra	1000 m	—N/a				1:57.49	35
Lee Sang-hwa	500 m	37.42	1	37.28	1	74.70 OR	1st place, gold medalist(s)
Lee Sang-hwa	1000 m	—N/a				1:15.94	12
Noh Seon-yeong	1500 m	—N/a				2:01.07	29
Noh Seon-yeong	3000 m	—N/a				4:19.02	25
Park Seung-ju	500 m	39.207	26	39.11	26	78.31	26
Park Seung-ju	1000 m	—N/a				1:18.94	31
Yang Shin-young	1500 m	—N/a				2:04.13	36
Yang Shin-young	3000 m	—N/a				4:23.67	27

Team pursuit

Athlete	Event	Quarterfinal	Semifinal	Final	
Athlete	Event	Opposition Time	Opposition Time	Opposition Time	Rank
Joo Hyong-jun; Kim Cheol-min; Lee Seung-hoon	Men's team pursuit	Russia; W 3:40.84	Canada; W 3:42.32	Final A Netherlands; L 3:40.85	2nd place, silver medalist(s)
Kim Bo-reum; Noh Seon-yeong; Yang Shin-young	Women's team pursuit	Japan; L 3:05.28	Did not advance	Final D Norway; L 3:11.54	8

== See also ==
- South Korea at the 2014 Summer Youth Olympics
- South Korea at the 2014 Winter Paralympics
