= Gim So-hui =

South Korean alpine skier (born 1996)

Personal information
- Born: August 19, 1996 (age 29) Gangwon, South Korea
- Height: 165 cm (5 ft 5 in)
- Weight: 65 kg (143 lb)

Skiing career
- Country: South Korea
- Sport: Alpine skiing
- Disciplines: Giant slalom, slalom
- World Cup debut: 6 March 2021 (age 24)

Olympics
- Teams: 4 – (2014–2026)
- Medals: 0

World Cup
- Seasons: 5 – (2021, 2023–2026)
Medal record
Women's alpine skiing
Representing South Korea
Asian Games
Silver medal – second place	2025 Harbin	Slalom

Korean name
- Hangul: 김소희
- Hanja: 金昭希
- RR: Gim Sohui
- MR: Kim Sohŭi

Gim So-hui (Korean: 김소희; born August 19, 1996 in Gangwon, South Korea) is an alpine skier from South Korea.

== Career ==
She competed for South Korea at the 2014, 2018, 2022 and 2026 Winter Olympics in the alpine skiing events.

== Biography ==
At first grade in elementary school, her talent was noticed by her maternal grandmother who was a pastor and ski instructor in Pyeongchang. She was a student at Doam Middle School. She went to Sangji Daegwallyeong High School. She went to Cheonan campus of Dankook University.

== Personal life ==
She is a Christian.

== Olympic results ==
Year
Year	Age	Slalom	Giant slalom	Super-G	Downhill	Combined	Team combined	Team event
2014	17	DNF1	53	—	—	—	—N/a	—N/a
2018	21	DNF1	45	—	—	—	—N/a	9
2022	25	39	33	—	—	—	—N/a	—
2026	29	DNF1	42	—	—	—N/a	—	—N/a
