= South Korea at the 2022 Winter Olympics =

- Flag of South Korea
- IOC code: KOR
- NOC: Korean Olympic Committee
- Website: www.sports.or.kr (in Korean)

in Beijing, China February 4–20, 2022
- Competitors: 64 (34 men and 30 women) in 13 sports
- Flag bearers (opening): Kim A-lang; Kwak Yoon-gy
- Flag bearer (closing): Cha Min-kyu
- Medals Ranked 14th: Gold 2 Silver 5 Bronze 2 Total 9

Winter Olympics appearances (overview)
- 1948; 1952; 1956; 1960; 1964; 1968; 1972; 1976; 1980; 1984; 1988; 1992; 1994; 1998; 2002; 2006; 2010; 2014; 2018; 2022; 2026

Other related appearances
- Korea (2018)

South Korea competed at the 2022 Winter Olympics in Beijing, China, from 4 to 20 February 2022.

On January 25, 2022, the Korean team of 63 athletes (34 men and 29 women) competing in 13 sports was announced. South Korea will not have any athletes in ice hockey or ski jumping.

On January 28, 2022 long track speed skater Kim Min-sun and short track speed skater Kwak Yoon-gy were named as the Korean flagbearers during the opening ceremony. Short track speed skater Kim A-lang later replaced Kim Min-sun as one of the flagbearers. Meanwhile short track speed skater Cha Min-kyu was the flagbearer during the closing ceremony.

== Competitors ==
The following is the list of number of competitors participating at the Games per sport/discipline.

Sport	Men	Women	Total
Alpine skiing	1	2	3
Biathlon	1	2	3
Bobsleigh	8	1	9
Cross-country skiing	2	3	5
Curling	0	5	5
Figure skating	2	2	4
Freestyle skiing	1	2	3
Luge	3	1	4
Nordic combined	1	—N/a	1
Short track speed skating	5	5	10
Skeleton	2	1	3
Snowboarding	2	2	4
Speed skating	6	4	10
Total	34	30	64

== Medalists ==
The following South Korean competitors won medals at the games. In the by discipline sections below, medalists' names are bolded.

Medal	Name	Sport	Event	Date
Gold	Hwang Dae-heon	Short track speed skating	Men's 1500m	9 February
Gold	Choi Min-jeong	Short track speed skating	Women's 1500 metres	16 February
Silver	Choi Min-jeong	Short track speed skating	Women's 1000 metres	11 February
Silver	Cha Min-kyu	Speed skating	Men's 500 metres	12 February
Silver	Choi Min-jeong; Kim A-lang; Lee Yu-bin; Seo Whi-min	Short track speed skating	Women's 3000 metre relay	13 February
Silver	Lee June-seo; Kim Dong-wook; Hwang Dae-heon; Kwak Yoon-gy; Park Jang-hyuk	Short track speed skating	Men's 5000 metre relay	15 February
Silver	Chung Jae-won	Speed skating	Men's Mass start	19 February
Bronze	Kim Min-seok	Speed skating	Men's 1500m	8 February
Bronze	Lee Seung-hoon	Speed skating	Men's Mass start	19 February

== Alpine skiing ==
By meeting the basic qualification standards South Korea qualified one male and one female alpine skier.

Athlete	Event	Run 1		Run 2		Total	
Athlete	Event	Time	Rank	Time	Rank	Time	Rank
Jung Dong-hyun	Men's giant slalom	DNF		Did not advance			
Jung Dong-hyun	Men's slalom	56.85	29	50.84	16	1:47.69	21
Gim So-hui	Women's giant slalom	1:04.12	38	1:03.10	32	2:07.22	33
Kang Young-seo	Women's giant slalom	DNF		Did not advance			
Gim So-hui	Women's slalom	57.31	42	56.80	39	1:54.11	39
Kang Young-seo	Women's slalom	DNF		Did not advance			

== Biathlon ==
South Korea qualified one male and two female biathletes.

Athlete	Event	Time	Misses	Rank
Timofey Lapshin	Men's individual	57:13.0	5 (1+1+2+1)	76
Timofey Lapshin	Men's sprint	27:30.8	2 (1+1)	82
Ekaterina Avvakumova	Women's individual	52:31.4	6 (3+0+2+1)	73
Kim Seon-su	Women's individual	56:37.5	6 (3+0+3+0)	84
Ekaterina Avvakumova	Women's pursuit	LAP		
Ekaterina Avvakumova	Women's sprint	23:19.4	2 (2+0)	49
Kim Seon-su	Women's sprint	25:18.2	1 (1+0)	83

== Bobsleigh ==
South Korea qualified two sleds in each of the two man and four man events, along with one quota in the women's monobob. This means South Korea can enter 9 athletes (eight men and one woman).

Men

Athlete	Event	Run 1		Run 2		Run 3		Run 4		Total	
Athlete	Event	Time	Rank	Time	Rank	Time	Rank	Time	Rank	Time	Rank
Suk Young-jin; Kim Hyeong-geun	Two-man	1:00.28	23	1:00.46	22	1:00.52	24	Did not advance		3:01.26	24
Won Yun-jong; Kim Jin-su	Two-man	59.89	14	1:00.28	17	1:00.10	14	1:00.97	20	4:01.24	19
Jang Ki-kun; Jung Hyun-woo; Kim Dong-hyun; Kim Hyeong-geun	Four-man	59.74	25	1:00.31	26	59.91	25	—N/a		2:59.96	25
Kim Jin-su; Kim Tae-yang; Suk Young-jin; Won Yun-jong	Four-man	59.45	19	59.60	16	59.38	16	59.59	15	3:58.02	18

Women

Athlete	Event	Run 1		Run 2		Run 3		Run 4		Total	
Athlete	Event	Time	Rank	Time	Rank	Time	Rank	Time	Rank	Time	Rank
Kim Yoo-ran	Monobob	1:06.68	20	1:07.02	18	1:06.41	14	1:06.41	13	4:26.52	18

== Cross-country skiing ==
South Korea qualified two male and three female cross-country skiers.

Distance

Athlete	Event	Classical		Freestyle		Final		
Athlete	Event	Time	Rank	Time	Rank	Time	Deficit	Rank
Jeong Jong-won	Men's 15 km classical	—N/a				46:34.6	+8:39.8	82
Kim Min-woo	Men's 15 km classical	—N/a				45:21.6	+7:26.8	79
Jeong Jong-won	Men's 30 km skiathlon	LAP						66
Kim Min-woo	Men's 30 km skiathlon	46:24.3	61	LAP				62
Lee Chae-won	Women's 10 km classical	—N/a				34:45.5	+6:39.2	75
Lee Eui-jin	Women's 10 km classical	—N/a				34:07.9	+6:01.6	72
Han Da-som	Women's 15 km skiathlon	29:52.3	63	DNF				-
Lee Chae-won	Women's 15 km skiathlon	28:01.6	61	27:01.7	61	55:52.6	+11:38.9	61

Sprint

Athlete	Event	Qualification		Quarterfinal		Semifinal		Final	
Athlete	Event	Time	Rank	Time	Rank	Time	Rank	Time	Rank
Jeong Jong-won	Men's	3:16.15	81	Did not advance					
Kim Min-woo	Men's	3:19.76	82	Did not advance					
Jeong Jong-won; Kim Min-woo	Men's team	—N/a				22:56.16	13	Did not advance	25
Lee Chae-won	Women's	DNS		Did not advance					
Lee Eui-jin	Women's	3:52.05	77	Did not advance					
Han Da-som; Lee Eui-jin	Women's team	—N/a				26:55.52	11	Did not advance	22

== Curling ==
Summary

Team	Event	Group stage										Semifinal	Final / BM	
Team	Event	Opposition Score	Opposition Score	Opposition Score	Opposition Score	Opposition Score	Opposition Score	Opposition Score	Opposition Score	Opposition Score	Rank	Opposition Score	Opposition Score	Rank
Kim Eun-jung; Kim Kyeong-ae; Kim Cho-hi; Kim Seon-yeong; Kim Yeong-mi	Women's tournament	CAN; **L** 7–12	GBR; **W** 9–7	ROC; **W** 9–5	CHN; **L** 5–6	USA; **L** 6–8	JPN; **W** 10–5	SUI; **L** 4–8	DEN; **W** 8–7	SWE; **L** 4–8	8	Did not advance		

=== Women's tournament ===
South Korea qualified their women's team (five athletes), by finishing third in the 2021 Olympic Qualification Event. Team Kim Eun-jung qualified as South Korean representatives by winning the 2021 Korean Curling Championships, finishing the tournament with an unmatched 11–1 record.

Final Round Robin Standings
Team	Skip	Pld	W	L	W–L	PF	PA	EW	EL	BE	SE	S%	DSC	Qualification
Switzerland	Silvana Tirinzoni	9	8	1	–	67	46	44	36	4	12	81.6%	19.14	Playoffs
Sweden	Anna Hasselborg	9	7	2	–	64	49	39	35	6	12	82.0%	25.02	Playoffs
Great Britain	Eve Muirhead	9	5	4	1–1	63	47	39	33	4	9	80.6%	35.27	Playoffs
Japan	Satsuki Fujisawa	9	5	4	1–1	64	62	40	36	2	13	82.3%	36.00	Playoffs
Canada	Jennifer Jones	9	5	4	1–1	71	59	42	41	1	14	80.4%	45.44	
United States	Tabitha Peterson	9	4	5	2–0	60	64	40	39	2	12	79.5%	33.87	
China	Han Yu	9	4	5	1–1	56	67	38	41	3	10	79.6%	30.06	
South Korea	Kim Eun-jung	9	4	5	0–2	62	66	40	42	3	10	80.8%	27.79	
Denmark	Madeleine Dupont	9	2	7	–	50	68	33	41	7	0	77.2%	23.36	
ROC	Alina Kovaleva	9	1	8	–	50	79	34	45	2	7	78.9%	29.34	

Round robin

South Korea had a bye in draws 1, 5 and 9.

Draw 2

Thursday, 10 February, 20:05

Sheet A	1	2	3	4	5	6	7	8	9	10	Final
**Canada (Jones)**	0	2	0	3	1	0	3	0	1	2	**12**
South Korea (Kim) 🔨	1	0	3	0	0	2	0	1	0	0	**7**

Draw 3

Friday, 11 February, 14:05

Sheet D	1	2	3	4	5	6	7	8	9	10	Final
**South Korea (Kim) 🔨**	0	0	2	1	0	2	0	0	4	0	**9**
Great Britain (Muirhead)	0	1	0	0	2	0	1	2	0	1	**7**

Draw 4

Saturday, 12 February, 9:05

Sheet B	1	2	3	4	5	6	7	8	9	10	Final
**South Korea (Kim) 🔨**	1	0	2	1	2	0	2	0	1	X	**9**
ROC (Kovaleva)	0	2	0	0	0	1	0	2	0	X	**5**

Draw 6

Sunday, 13 February, 14:05

Sheet C	1	2	3	4	5	6	7	8	9	10	11	Final
South Korea (Kim)	2	0	0	1	0	1	0	0	0	1	0	**5**
**China (Han) 🔨**	0	1	1	0	1	0	0	2	0	0	1	**6**

Draw 7

Monday, 14 February, 9:05

Sheet D	1	2	3	4	5	6	7	8	9	10	Final
**United States (Peterson)**	0	0	1	0	1	3	0	2	0	1	**8**
South Korea (Kim) 🔨	0	1	0	1	0	0	2	0	2	0	**6**

Draw 8

Monday, 14 February, 20:05

Sheet C	1	2	3	4	5	6	7	8	9	10	Final
Japan (Fujisawa) 🔨	0	2	0	0	2	0	0	1	0	X	**5**
**South Korea (Kim)**	1	0	3	1	0	2	1	0	2	X	**10**

Draw 10

Wednesday, 16 February, 9:05

Sheet B	1	2	3	4	5	6	7	8	9	10	Final
**Switzerland (Tirinzoni) 🔨**	0	0	1	0	3	0	0	0	2	2	**8**
South Korea (Kim)	0	1	0	1	0	1	1	0	0	0	**4**

Draw 11

Wednesday, 16 February, 20:05

Sheet A	1	2	3	4	5	6	7	8	9	10	Final
**South Korea (Kim)**	0	2	0	1	0	2	0	1	0	2	**8**
Denmark (Dupont) 🔨	1	0	1	0	3	0	1	0	1	0	**7**

Draw 12

Thursday, 17 February, 14:05

Sheet D	1	2	3	4	5	6	7	8	9	10	Final
South Korea (Kim)	0	2	0	1	0	0	1	0	0	0	**4**
**Sweden (Hasselborg) 🔨**	0	0	1	0	1	1	0	2	1	2	**8**

== Figure skating ==
In the 2021 World Figure Skating Championships in Stockholm, Sweden, South Korea secured one quota in the men's and two quotas in the ladies competitions. A second men's quota was secured at the 2021 CS Nebelhorn Trophy.

Athlete	Event	SP		FS		Total	
Athlete	Event	Points	Rank	Points	Rank	Points	Rank
Cha Jun-hwan	Men's singles	99.51	4 **Q**	182.87	7	282.38	5
Lee Si-hyeong	Men's singles	65.69	27	Did not advance			
Kim Ye-lim	Women's singles	67.78	9 **Q**	134.85	11	202.63	9
You Young	Women's singles	70.34	6 **Q**	142.75	4	213.09	6

== Freestyle skiing ==
Freeski

Athlete	Event	Qualification					Final				
Athlete	Event	Run 1	Run 2	Run 3	Best	Rank	Run 1	Run 2	Run 3	Best	Rank
Lee Seung-hun	Men's halfpipe	49.75	56.75	—N/a	56.75	16	Did not advance				
Jang Yu-jin	Women's halfpipe	3.75	4.25	—N/a	4.25	20	Did not advance				
Kim Da-eun	Women's halfpipe	44.50	45.50	—N/a	45.50	17	Did not advance				

== Luge ==
South Korea qualified one sled in each event, and a spot in the mixed relay. This means South Korea can enter three men and one woman.

Athlete	Event	Run 1		Run 2		Run 3		Run 4		Total	
Athlete	Event	Time	Rank	Time	Rank	Time	Rank	Time	Rank	Time	Rank
Lim Nam-kyu	Men's singles	1:02.438	34	59.794	30	59.538	28	Did not advance		3:01.770	33
Cho Jung-myung; Park Jin-yong	Open doubles	59.361	10	59.366	12	—N/a				1:58.727	12
Aileen Christina Frisch	Women's singles	59.776	23	59.642	20	59.055	18	1:01.811	19	4:00.284	19

Mixed

Athlete	Event	Run 1		Run 2		Run 3		Total	
Athlete	Event	Time	Rank	Time	Rank	Time	Rank	Time	Rank
Aileen Frisch; Lim Nam-kyu; Park Jin-yong / Cho Jung-myung	Team relay	1:02.682	14	1:05.265	14	1:03.291	8	3:11.238	13

== Nordic combined ==
Athlete	Event	Ski jumping			Cross-country		Total	
Athlete	Event	Distance	Points	Rank	Time	Rank	Time	Rank
Park Je-un	Large hill/10 km	107.0	67.9	39	30:08.5	47	34:56.5	44
Park Je-un	Normal hill/10 km	90.0	82.3	36	29:11.3	43	32:34.3	42

== Skeleton ==
South Korea qualified three athletes in skeleton (two male and one female).

Athlete	Event	Run 1		Run 2		Run 3		Run 4		Total	
Athlete	Event	Time	Rank	Time	Rank	Time	Rank	Time	Rank	Time	Rank
Jung Seung-gi	Men's	1:01.18	11	1:01.04	10	1:00.69	9	1:00.83	9	4:03.74	10
Yun Sung-bin	Men's	1:01.26	13	1:01.17	13	1:01.03	12	1:00.63	7	4:04.09	12
Kim Eun-ji	Women's	1:03.28	22	1:03.68	23	1:02.83	22	Did not advance		3:09.79	23

== Snowboarding ==
Parallel

Athlete	Event	Qualification		Round of 16	Quarterfinal	Semifinal	Final	
Athlete	Event	Time	Rank	Opposition Time	Opposition Time	Opposition Time	Opposition Time	Rank
Kim Sang-kyum	Men's giant slalom	1:23.81	24	Did not advance				
Lee Sang-ho	Men's giant slalom	1:20.54	1 **Q**	Bagozza (ITA); **W**	Wild (ROC); **L** +0.01	Did not advance		5
Jeong Hae-rim	Women's giant slalom	1:29.10	18	Did not advance				

Freestyle

Athlete	Event	Qualification				Final				
Athlete	Event	Run 1	Run 2	Best	Rank	Run 1	Run 2	Run 3	Best	Rank
Lee Chae-un	Men's Halfpipe	26.00	35.00	35.00	18	Did not advance				
Lee Na-yoon	Women's Halfpipe	31.00	34.50	34.50	20	Did not advance				

== Short track speed skating ==
South Korea qualified in all three relays with the maximum of five athletes in both genders. South Korean officials alleged systemic bias in favor of China in the short track speed skating competitions after disqualifications of several leaders.

Men

Athlete	Event	Heat		Quarterfinal		Semifinal		Final	
Athlete	Event	Time	Rank	Time	Rank	Time	Rank	Time	Rank
Hwang Dae-heon	500 m	40.971	2 **Q**	40.636	2 **Q**	**PEN**		Did not advance	10
Lee June-seo	500 m	**PEN**		Did not advance					
Hwang Dae-heon	1000 m	1:23.042 **OR**	1 **Q**	1:24.693	1 **Q**	**PEN**		Did not advance	8
Lee June-seo	1000 m	1:24.698	1 **Q**	1:23.682	1 **Q**	**PEN**		Did not advance	9
Park Jang-hyuk	1000 m	1:24.081	1 **Q**	-	3 **ADV**	DNS		Did not advance	10
**Hwang Dae-heon**	1500 m	—N/a		2:14.910	1 **Q**	2:13.188	1 **QA**	2:09.219	1st place, gold medalist(s)
Lee June-seo	1500 m	—N/a		2:18.630	1 **Q**	2:16.586	1 **QA**	2:09.622	5
Park Jang-hyuk	1500 m	—N/a		2:12.116	3 **Q**	2:12.751	2 **QA**	2:10.176	7
**Hwang Dae-heon**; **Kim Dong-wook**; **Kwak Yoon-gy**; **Lee June-seo**; **Park Jang-hyuk**	5000 m relay	—N/a				6:37.879	1 **QA**	6:41.679	2nd place, silver medalist(s)

Women

Athlete	Event	Heat		Quarterfinal		Semifinal		Final	
Athlete	Event	Time	Rank	Time	Rank	Time	Rank	Time	Rank
Choi Min-jeong	500 m	42.853	1 **Q**	1:04.939	4	Did not advance			14
Lee Yu-bin	500 m	43.141	4	Did not advance					26
**Choi Min-jeong**	1000 m	1:28.053	1 **Q**	1:28.722	2 **Q**	1:26.850	3 **QA**	1:28.443	2nd place, silver medalist(s)
Lee Yu-bin	1000 m	1:27.862	2 **Q**	1:29.120	1 **Q**	1:28.170	3 **QB**	1:29.739	6
Kim A-lang	1000 m	1:28.680	3	Did not advance					22
**Choi Min-jeong**	1500 m	—N/a		2:20.846	1 **Q**	2:16.831 **OR**	1 **QA**	2:17.789	1st place, gold medalist(s)
Lee Yu-bin	1500 m	—N/a		2:17.851	2 **Q**	2:22.157	1 **QA**	2:18.825	6
Kim A-lang	1500 m	—N/a		2:32.879	1 **Q**	2:22.420	4 **QB**	2:45.707	13
**Choi Min-jeong**; **Kim A-lang**; **Lee Yu-bin**; **Seo Whi-min**	3000 m relay	—N/a				4:05.904	2 **QA**	4:03.627	2nd place, silver medalist(s)

Mixed

Athlete	Event	Quarterfinal		Semifinal		Final	
Athlete	Event	Time	Rank	Time	Rank	Time	Rank
Choi Min-jeong; Hwang Dae-heon; Lee Yu-bin; Park Jang-hyuk	2000 m relay	2:48.308	3	Did not advance			9

Legend
ADV: Advanced due to being impeded by another skater; OR: Olympic record; PEN: Penalty; Q: Qualified; QA: Qualified to medal round; QB: Qualified to consolation round

== Speed skating ==
South Korea qualified four men and six women.

Men

Athlete	Event	Time	Rank
**Cha Min-kyu**	500 m	34.39	2nd place, silver medalist(s)
Kim Jun-ho	500 m	34.54	6
Cha Min-kyu	1000 m	1:09.69	18
Kim Min-seok	1000 m	1:10.08	24
**Kim Min-seok**	1500 m	1:44.24	3rd place, bronze medalist(s)
Park Seong-hyeon	1500 m	1:47.59	21

Women

Athlete	Event	Time	Rank
Kim Min-sun	500 m	37.60	7
Kim Hyun-yung	1000 m	1:17.50	25
Kim Min-sun	1000 m	1:16.49	16
Park Ji-woo	1000 m	1:19.39	30

Mass start

Athlete	Event	Semifinals			Finals		
Athlete	Event	Points	Time	Rank	Points	Time	Rank
**Chung Jae-won**	Men's	12	7:56.76	4 **Q**	40	7:47.18	2nd place, silver medalist(s)
**Lee Seung-hoon**	Men's	40	7:43.63	2 **Q**	20	7:47.20	3rd place, bronze medalist(s)
Kim Bo-reum	Women's	40	8:34.23	2 **Q**	6	8:16.81	5
Park Ji-woo	Women's	0	8:53.64	13	Did not advance		26

Team Pursuit

Athlete	Event	Quarterfinal		Semifinal		Final	
Athlete	Event	Time	Rank	Opposition Time	Rank	Opposition Time	Rank
Chung Jae-won; Kim Min-seok; Lee Seung-hoon	Men's	3:41.89	6	Did not advance		Final C Canada; **L** 3:53.77	6
