= South Korea at the 1988 Winter Olympics =

- IOC code: KOR
- NOC: Korean Olympic Committee
- Website: www.sports.or.kr (in Korean and English)

in Calgary
- Competitors: 22 in 5 sports
- Flag bearer: Hong Kun-Pyo
- Officials: 18
- Medals: Gold 0 Silver 0 Bronze 0 Total 0

Winter Olympics appearances (overview)
- 1948; 1952; 1956; 1960; 1964; 1968; 1972; 1976; 1980; 1984; 1988; 1992; 1994; 1998; 2002; 2006; 2010; 2014; 2018; 2022; 2026

Other related appearances
- Korea (2018)

South Korea, as Republic of Korea, competed at the 1988 Winter Olympics in Calgary, Alberta, Canada.

== Competitors ==
The following is the list of number of competitors in the Games.

Sport	Men	Women	Total
Alpine skiing	4	0	4
Biathlon	5	–	5
Cross-country skiing	5	0	5
Figure skating	1	1	2
Speed skating	3	3	6
Total	18	4	22

== Alpine skiing ==
Men

Athlete	Event	Record	Rank
Kang Nak-Youn	Giant Slalom	2:33.18	51
Kang Nak-Youn	Slalom	2:03.73	27
Kang Nak-Youn	Super G	Did Not Finish	-
Nam Won-Gi	Giant Slalom	2:31.78	48
Nam Won-Gi	Slalom	2:04.29	28
Nam Won-Gi	Super G	Did Not Finish	-
Park Jae-Hyuk	Giant Slalom	Did Not Finish	-
Park Jae-Hyuk	Slalom	2:04.30	29
Park Jae-Hyuk	Super G	1:53.89	40
Huh Sung-Wook	Giant Slalom	Did Not Finish	-
Huh Sung-Wook	Slalom	Did Not Finish	-
Huh Sung-Wook	Super G	1:55.13	41

== Biathlon ==
Men

Athlete	Event	Record	Rank
Shin Yong-Sun	10 km	33:05.4	64
Shin Yong-Sun	20 km	1:17:44.5	66
Joo Young-Dai	10 km	34:50.4	66
Joo Young-Dai	20 km	1:14:27.5	63
Kim Yong-Woon	10 km	35:18.6	67
Kim Yong-Woon	20 km	1:17:23.0	65
Jeong Young-Suk	10 km	35:31.3	69
Hong Byung-Sik	20 km	1:14:03.2	62
Hong Byung-Sik; Joo Young-Dai; Kim Yong-Woon; Shin Yong-Sun	4 x 7.5 km Relay	1:51.42.7	16

== Cross-country skiing ==
Men

Athlete	Event	Record	Rank
Park Ki-Ho	15 km	47:44.3	54
Park Ki-Ho	30 km	1:36.43.9	55
Park Ki-Ho	50 km	2:22:36.4	50
Jeon Yeung-Hae	15 km	48:22.3	59
Jeon Yeung-Hae	30 km	1:38.05.3	60
Jeon Yeung-Hae	50 km	2:20:50.8	48
Hong Kun-Pyo	15 km	50:21.4	71
Hong Kun-Pyo	30 km	1:43.26.4	73
Hong Kun-Pyo	50 km	2:23:13.6	51
Cho Sung-Hoon	15 km	51:31.1	75
Cho Sung-Hoon	30 km	1:43.30.3	75
Park Byung-Woo	50 km	Did Not Finish	-
Hong Kun-Pyo; Park Ki-Ho; Cho Sung-Hoon; Jeon, Yeung-Hae	4 × 10 km Relay	1:59:00.4	15

== Figure skating ==
Men

Athlete	Event	Rank
Jung Sung-Il	Single	22

Women

Athlete	Event	Rank
Byun Sung-Jin	Single	DNQ

== Speed skating ==
Men

Athlete	Event	Record	Rank
Bae Ki-Tae	500m	36.90	5
Bae Ki-Tae	1000m	1:14.36	9
Hwang Ik-Hwan	1500m	1:56.50	26
Hwang Ik-Hwan	5000m	7:10.65	36
Kim Kwan-Kyu	1500m	1:56.85	29
Kim Kwan-Kyu	5000m	7:02.13	29
Kim Kwan-Kyu	10000m	14:34.65	22

Women

Athlete	Event	Record	Rank
Yoo Seon-Hee	500m	40.92	13
Yoo Seon-Hee	1000m	1:22.35	17
Kim Young-ok	1000m	2:11.95	24
Kim Young-ok	3000m	4:30.60	22
Kim Young-ok	5000m	7:46.51	17
Choi Hye-Sook	1000m	2:12.96	28
Choi Hye-Sook	3000m	4:42.26	22

== Short track speed skating (Demonstration sport) ==
Men

Athlete	Event	Heats		Quarterfinals		Semifinals		Final	
Athlete	Event	Time	Rank	Time	Rank	Time	Rank	Time	Rank
Kim Ki-hoon	500m	46.21	2nd	45.92	1st	45.15	3rd	48.82	7th
Kim Ki-hoon	1000m			1:39.10	1st	1:34.30	3rd	1:37.20	8th
Kim Ki-hoon	1500m			2:32.17	1st	2:25.39	2nd	2:26.68	1st
Kim Ki-hoon	3000m			5:41.32	6th	Not qualified			
Lee Joon-ho	500m	47.27	1st	47.24	4th	Not qualified			
Lee Joon-ho	1000m			1:34.89	1st	1:35.04	2nd	Didqualified	7th
Lee Joon-ho	1500m			2:31.89	3rd	2:36.41	3rd	2:38.19	7th
Lee Joon-ho	3000m			5:29.13	1st	5:30.37	4th	5:21.63	1st
Mo Ji-Soo	500m	Didqualified	-	Not qualified					
Mo Ji-Soo	1000m			1:35.73	2nd	1:59.63	6th	Not qualified	
Mo Ji-Soo	1500m			3:13.11	5th	Not qualified			
Mo Ji-Soo	3000m			5:22.60	2nd	5:26.18	4th	5:32.24	6th

Women

Athlete	Event	Heats		Quarterfinals		Semifinals		Final	
Athlete	Event	Time	Rank	Time	Rank	Time	Rank	Time	Rank
Hong Ho-Kyung	500m	52.31	4th	Not qualified					
Hong Ho-Kyung	1000m			1:49.20	5th	Not qualified			
Hong Ho-Kyung	1500m			2:50.10	4th	Not qualified			
Hong Ho-Kyung	3000m			5:41,30	6th	Not qualified			
Lee Yeon-Sook	500m	51.91	4th	Not qualified					
Lee Yeon-Sook	1000m			1:44.99	2nd	1:43.56	5th	Not qualified	
Lee Yeon-Sook	1500m			2:46.02	3rd	2:43.20	4th	2:44.04	9th
Lee Yeon-Sook	3000m			5:54,50	5th	Not qualified			
Yoo Boo-Won	500m	49.49	4th	Not qualified					
Yoo Boo-Won	1000m			Didqualified	-	Not qualified			
Yoo Boo-Won	1500m			2:44.14	2nd	2:43.40	4th	2:44.28	10th
Yoo Boo-Won	3000m			6:14,44	3rd	6:18,31	5th	Not qualified	
