= South Korea at the 1994 Winter Olympics =

- IOC code: KOR
- NOC: Korean Olympic Committee
- Website: www.sports.or.kr (in Korean and English)

in Lillehammer
- Competitors: 21 in 5 sports
- Flag bearer: Lee Joon-ho
- Officials: 21
- Medals Ranked 6th: Gold 4 Silver 1 Bronze 1 Total 6

Winter Olympics appearances (overview)
- 1948; 1952; 1956; 1960; 1964; 1968; 1972; 1976; 1980; 1984; 1988; 1992; 1994; 1998; 2002; 2006; 2010; 2014; 2018; 2022; 2026

Other related appearances
- Korea (2018)

South Korea, as Republic of Korea, competed at the 1994 Winter Olympics in Lillehammer, Norway.

== Medalists ==
Medal	Name	Sport	Event	Date
Gold	Kim Ki-hoon	Short track speed skating	Men's 1000 metres	22 February
Gold	Chun Lee-kyung; Kim So-hee; Kim Yoon-mi; Won Hye-kyung	Short track speed skating	Women's 3000 metre relay	22 February
Gold	Chun Lee-kyung	Short track speed skating	Women's 1000 metres	26 February
Gold	Chae Ji-hoon	Short track speed skating	Men's 500 metres	26 February
Silver	Chae Ji-hoon	Short track speed skating	Men's 1000 metres	22 February
Bronze	Kim So-hee	Short track speed skating	Women's 1000 metres	26 February

== Competitors ==
The following is the list of number of competitors in the Games.

Sport	Men	Women	Total
Alpine skiing	1	0	1
Cross-country skiing	2	0	2
Figure skating	1	1	2
Short track speed skating	3	4	7
Speed skating	4	5	9
Total	11	10	21

== Alpine skiing ==
Men

Athlete	Event	Record	Rank
Huh Sung-wook	Giant Slalom	3:07.75	33
Huh Sung-wook	Slalom	2:13.66	21

== Cross-country skiing ==
Men

Athlete	Event	Record	Rank
Park Byung-chul	10 km	28:47.3	77
Park Byung-chul	15 km pursuit	1:09:56.3	65
Park Byung-chul	30 km	1:24:16.0	56
An Jin-soo	10 km	28:42.9	75
An Jin-soo	15 km pursuit	1:11:16.1	68
An Jin-soo	30 km	1:23:21.4	51

== Figure skating ==
Men

Athlete	Event	Place Point	Rank
Jung Sung-il	Single	25.0	17

Women

Athlete	Event	Place Point	Rank
Lee Yoon-jung	Single	32.0	21

== Short track speed skating ==
Men

Athlete	Event	Heats		Quarterfinals		Semifinals		Final	
Athlete	Event	Time	Rank	Time	Rank	Time	Rank	Time	Rank
Chae Ji-hoon	500 metres	44.36	1st	44.69	1st	43.72	2nd	43.45	1st place, gold medalist(s)
Chae Ji-hoon	1000 metres	1:32.11	1st	1:31.40	1st	1:31.56	1st	1:34.92	2nd place, silver medalist(s)
Kim Ki-hoon	500 metres	45.32	2nd	44.04	3rd	Ranking Round			12th
Kim Ki-hoon	1000 metres	1:33.63	1st	1:30.89	2nd	1:31.69	1st	1:34.57	1st place, gold medalist(s)
Lee Joon-ho	500 metres	45.41	2nd	45.27	2nd	45.97	3rd	45.13	6th
Lee Joon-ho	1000 metres	1:33.67	1st	1:29.58	1st	1:31.93	3rd	1:44.99	5th

Women

Athlete	Event	Heats		Quarterfinals		Semifinals		Final	
Athlete	Event	Time	Rank	Time	Rank	Time	Rank	Time	Rank
Won Hye-kyung	500 metres	48.08	2nd	48.87	2nd	47.63	2nd	47.60	4th
Won Hye-kyung	1000 metres	1:42.75	1st	1:39.03	3rd	Ranking Round			9th
Kim So-hee	500 metres	47.77	2nd	46.97	1st	46.36	3rd	49.01	5th
Kim So-hee	1000 metres	1:43.76	1st	1:38.61	1st	1:37.17	1st	1:37.09	3rd place, bronze medalist(s)
Chun Lee-kyung	500 metres	47.14	2nd	1:09.56	4th	Ranking Round			15th
Chun Lee-kyung	1000 metres	1:40.49	2nd	1:40.30	2nd	1:55.07	2nd	1:36.87	1st place, gold medalist(s)
Chun Lee-kyung; Kim So-hee; Kim Yoon-mi; Won Hye-kyung	3000 metres relay					4:27.15	2nd	4:26.64	1st place, gold medalist(s)

== Speed skating ==
Men

Athlete	Event	Record	Rank
Kim Yoon-man	500m	37.10	14
Kim Yoon-man	1000m	1:14.97	18
Jegal Sung-ryeol	500m	37.90	30
Jegal Sung-ryeol	1000m	1:16.64	39
Lee Jae-sik	500m	38.10	T34
Lee Jae-sik	1000m	1:16.96	40
Lee Jae-sik	1500m	2:20.60	41
Lee Kyu-hyuk	500m	38.14	36
Lee Kyu-hyuk	1000m	1:15.92	32

Women

Athlete	Event	Record	Rank
Yoo Seon-hee	500m	39.92	5
Yoo Seon-hee	1000m	1:21.40	15
Kang Mi-young	500m	41.96	28
Kang Mi-young	1000m	1:24.19	32
Jeong Bae-young	500m	42.63	31
Jeong Bae-young	1000m	1:25.93	36
Chun Hee-joo	500m	43.05	32
Chun Hee-joo	1000m	1:25.67	35
Chun Hee-joo	1500m	2:12.14	30
Baek Eun-bi	3000m	4:34.86	23

== Sources ==
- Official Olympic Reports
- International Olympic Committee results database
