= South Korea at the 1972 Winter Olympics =

- IOC code: KOR
- NOC: Korean Olympic Committee
- Website: www.sports.or.kr (in Korean) www.sports.or.kr/eng/index.do (in English)

in Sapporo
- Competitors: 5 in 2 sports
- Officials: 8
- Medals: Gold 0 Silver 0 Bronze 0 Total 0

Winter Olympics appearances (overview)
- 1948; 1952; 1956; 1960; 1964; 1968; 1972; 1976; 1980; 1984; 1988; 1992; 1994; 1998; 2002; 2006; 2010; 2014; 2018; 2022; 2026

Other related appearances
- Korea (2018)

South Korea, as Republic of Korea, competed at the 1972 Winter Olympics in Sapporo, Japan.

== Figure skating ==
Women

Athlete	Event	Points	Places	Rank
Chang Myung-Soo	Single	2117.0	171	19

== Speed skating ==
Men

Athlete	Event	Record	Rank
Jeong Chung-Ku	500m	41.42	22
Jeong Chung-Ku	1500m	2:17.36	35

Women

Athlete	Event	Record	Rank
Choi Jung-Hee	500m	46.74	22
Choi Jung-Hee	1000m	1:37.57	31
Choi Jung-Hee	1500m	2:29.79	22
Choi Jung-Hee	3000m	Did Not Start	-
Jeon Seon-Ok	500m	Did Not Start	-
Jeon Seon-Ok	1000m	1:36.24	25
Jeon Seon-Ok	1500m	2:32.06	28
Jeon Seon-Ok	3000m	5:22.27	19
Lee Kyeong-Hee	500m	47.45	26
Lee Kyeong-Hee	1000m	1:36.50	26
