= South Korea at the Olympics =

- IOC code: KOR
- NOC: Korean Olympic Committee
- Website: www.sports.or.kr (in Korean and English)
- Medals Ranked 18th: Gold 145 Silver 134 Bronze 130 Total 409

Summer appearances
- 1948; 1952; 1956; 1960; 1964; 1968; 1972; 1976; 1980; 1984; 1988; 1992; 1996; 2000; 2004; 2008; 2012; 2016; 2020; 2024; 2028

Winter appearances
- 1948; 1952; 1956; 1960; 1964; 1968; 1972; 1976; 1980; 1984; 1988; 1992; 1994; 1998; 2002; 2006; 2010; 2014; 2018; 2022; 2026

Other related appearances
- Korea (2018)

The Republic of Korea (commonly known as South Korea) first participated at the Olympic Games in 1948, and has sent athletes to compete in every Summer Olympic Games since then, except for 1980 which they boycotted. South Korea has also participated in every Winter Olympic Games since 1948, except for the 1952 games. The National Olympic Committee for South Korea is the Korean Sport & Olympic Committee, which was founded in 1946 and recognized in 1947.

The first ethnic Korean athletes to win medals did so at the 1936 Summer Olympics in Berlin, when Sohn Kee-chung and Nam Sung-yong won gold and bronze respectively in the men's marathon as members of the Japanese team. As Korea was under Japanese rule at that time, making them both Japanese subjects, the IOC credits both medals to Japan.

South Korea won its first medals as an independent nation at its first appearance in 1948, and won its first gold medal in 1976. South Korean athletes have won a total of 287 medals at the Summer Games, with the most gold medals won in archery, and 79 medals at the Winter Games, a majority in short track speed skating. The nation has won more medals in this winter sport than any other nation since it was introduced to the Olympic program in 1992. During the Sunshine Policy eras, South Korea and North Korea symbolically marched as one team at the opening ceremonies of the 2000, 2004 and 2006 Olympics, but competed separately. At the 2018 Winter Olympics, North Korean and South Korean athletes unified to form the Korea women's national ice hockey team.

Male athletes receive an exemption from mandatory active-duty military service by winning any medal at the Olympic Games. They instead complete basic military training and a short period of community service, a policy designed to reward achievements that raise national prestige. Introduced in 1973 by the dictator Park Chung Hee, the policy has faced increasing domestic debate regarding civic equity and whether athletic achievements merit exemption from national duty.

== Timeline of participation ==
Olympic Year/s	Teams		
1912–1936	Japan		
1948–1960		South Korea	Japan
1964 W	North Korea (NKO)	South Korea	Japan
1964 S–1968		South Korea	Japan
1972–present	North Korea (PRK)	South Korea	Japan

== Hosted games ==
South Korea has hosted the Games on two occasions:

Games	Host city	Dates	Nations	Participants	Events
1988 Summer Olympics	Seoul	17 September – 2 October	160	8,391	263
2018 Winter Olympics	Pyeongchang	9 – 25 February	92	2,952	102

=== Unsuccessful bids ===
Games	City	Winner of bid
2010 Winter Olympics	Pyeongchang	Vancouver, Canada
2014 Winter Olympics	Pyeongchang	Sochi, Russia

== Medal tables ==
=== Medals by Summer Games ===
Host country

Games	Athletes	Gold	Silver	Bronze	Total	Rank
1912–1936	as part of Japan					
(United Kingdom) 1948 London	50	0	0	2	2	32
(Finland) 1952 Helsinki	19	0	0	2	2	37
(Australia) 1956 Melbourne	35	0	1	1	2	29
(Italy) 1960 Rome	36	0	0	0	0	–
(Japan) 1964 Tokyo	154	0	2	1	3	27
1968 Mexico City	54	0	1	1	2	36
(West Germany) 1972 Munich	42	0	1	0	1	33
(Canada) 1976 Montreal	50	1	1	4	6	19
(Soviet Union) 1980 Moscow	boycotted					
(United States) 1984 Los Angeles	175	6	6	7	19	10
(South Korea) 1988 Seoul	401	12	10	11	33	4
(Spain) 1992 Barcelona	226	12	5	12	29	7
(United States) 1996 Atlanta	300	7	15	5	27	10
(Australia) 2000 Sydney	281	8	10	10	28	12
(Greece) 2004 Athens	264	9	12	9	30	9
(China) 2008 Beijing	267	13	11	8	32	7
(United Kingdom) 2012 London	248	13	9	9	31	5
(Brazil) 2016 Rio de Janeiro	204	9	3	9	21	8
(Japan) 2020 Tokyo	237	6	4	10	20	16
(France) 2024 Paris	144	13	9	10	32	8
(United States) 2028 Los Angeles	future event					
(Australia) 2032 Brisbane	future event					
Total (19/30)	3,187	109	100	111	320	15

=== Medals by Winter Games ===
Host country

Games	Athletes	Gold	Silver	Bronze	Total	Rank
1928–1936	as part of Japan					
(Switzerland) 1948 St. Moritz	3	0	0	0	0	–
(Norway) 1952 Oslo	did not participate					
(Italy) 1956 Cortina d'Ampezzo	4	0	0	0	0	–
(United States) 1960 Squaw Valley	7	0	0	0	0	–
(Austria) 1964 Innsbruck	7	0	0	0	0	–
(France) 1968 Grenoble	8	0	0	0	0	–
(Japan) 1972 Sapporo	5	0	0	0	0	–
(Austria) 1976 Innsbruck	3	0	0	0	0	–
(United States) 1980 Lake Placid	10	0	0	0	0	–
(Socialist Federal Republic of Yugoslavia) 1984 Sarajevo	15	0	0	0	0	–
(Canada) 1988 Calgary	22	0	0	0	0	–
(France) 1992 Albertville	23	2	1	1	4	10
(Norway) 1994 Lillehammer	21	4	1	1	6	6
(Japan) 1998 Nagano	37	3	1	2	6	9
(United States) 2002 Salt Lake City	48	2	2	0	4	14
(Italy) 2006 Turin	40	6	3	2	11	7
(Canada) 2010 Vancouver	46	6	6	2	14	5
(Russia) 2014 Sochi	71	3	3	2	8	13
(South Korea) 2018 Pyeongchang	122	5	8	4	17	7
(China) 2022 Beijing	64	2	5	2	9	14
(Italy) 2026 Milano Cortina	71	3	4	3	10	13
(France) 2030 French Alps	future event					
(United States) 2034 Utah	future event					
Total (20/25)	627	36	34	19	89	15

=== Medals by summer sport ===
Leading in that sport

Sport	Gold	Silver	Bronze	Total
Archery	32	10	8	50
Taekwondo	14	3	8	25
Judo	11	19	21	51
Wrestling	11	11	14	36
Shooting	10	12	1	23
Badminton	7	8	7	22
Fencing	7	4	8	19
Boxing	3	7	11	21
Weightlifting	3	7	7	17
Table tennis	3	3	14	20
Gymnastics	2	4	5	11
Handball	2	4	1	7
Swimming	1	3	1	5
Athletics	1	1	0	2
Baseball	1	0	1	2
Golf	1	0	0	1
Field hockey	0	3	0	3
Basketball	0	1	0	1
Modern pentathlon	0	0	2	2
Football	0	0	1	1
Volleyball	0	0	1	1
Totals (21 entries)	109	100	111	320

=== Medals by winter sport ===
Sport	Gold	Silver	Bronze	Total
Short track speed skating	28	19	13	60
Speed skating	5	10	5	20
Snowboarding	1	2	1	4
Figure skating	1	1	0	2
Skeleton	1	0	0	1
Bobsleigh	0	1	0	1
Curling	0	1	0	1
Totals (7 entries)	36	34	19	89

== Most successful Olympians ==
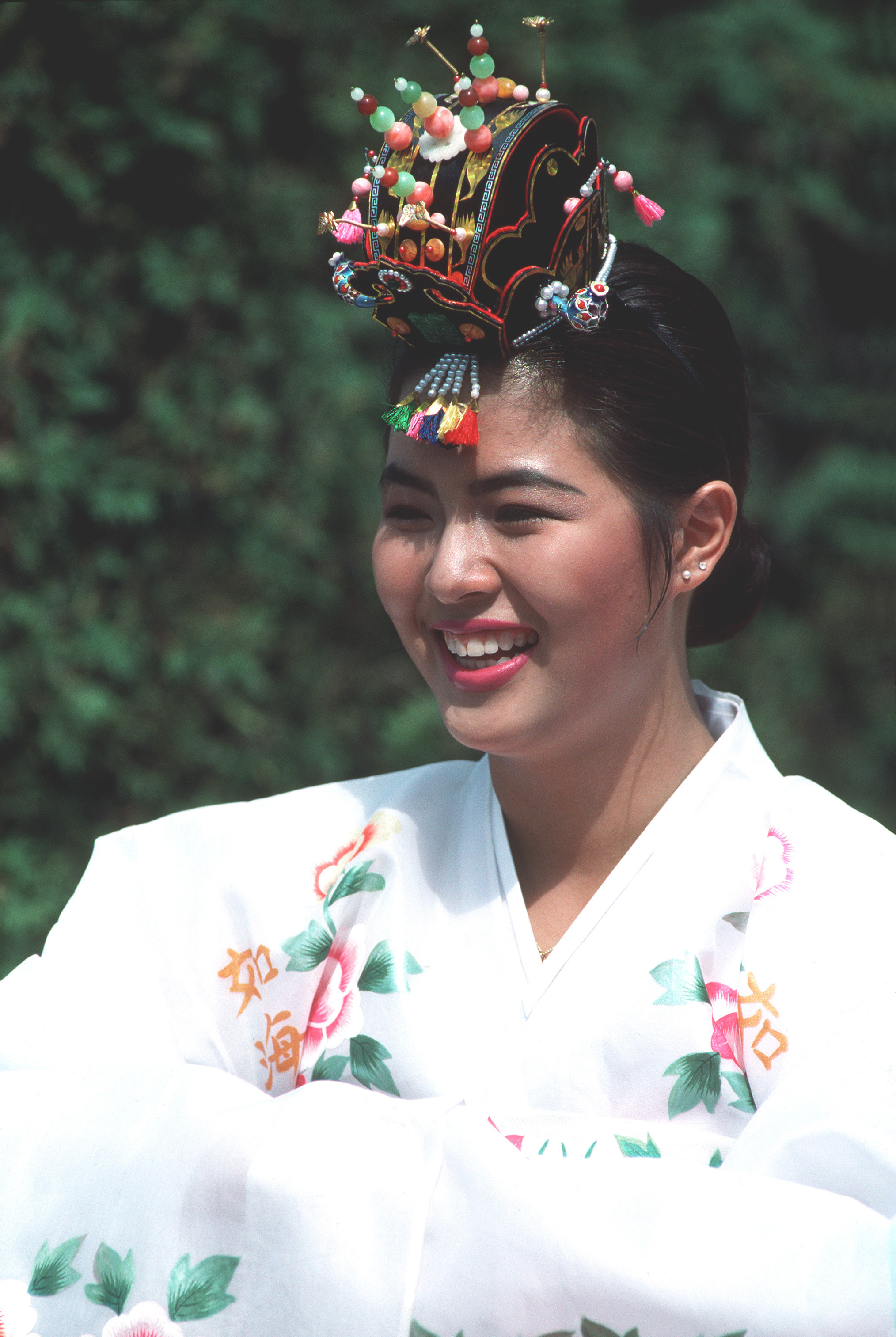
A South Korean volunteer at the Games of the XXIV Olympiad in 1988.

Athlete	Sport	Type	Olympics	Gold	Silver	Bronze	Total
Kim Woo-jin	Archery	Summer	2016, 2020, 2024	5	0	0	5
Choi Min-jeong	Short track speed skating	Winter	2018, 2022, 2026	4	3	0	7
Jin Jong-oh	Shooting	Summer	2004, 2008, 2012, 2016	4	2	0	6
Kim Soo-nyung	Archery	Summer	1988, 1992, 2000	4	1	1	6
Chun Lee-kyung	Short track speed skating	Winter	1992, 1994, 1998	4	0	1	5
Shim Suk-hee	Short track speed skating	Winter	2014, 2018, 2026	3	1	1	6
Park Sung-hyun	Archery	Summer	2004, 2008	3	1	0	4
Ahn Hyun-soo	Short track speed skating	Winter	2002, 2006	3	0	1	4
Ki Bo-bae	Archery	Summer	2012, 2016	3	0	1	4
Lim Si-hyeon	Archery	Summer	2024	3	0	0	3
Kim Je-deok	Archery	Summer	2020, 2024	3	0	0	3
Oh Sang-uk	Fencing	Summer	2020, 2024	3	0	0	3
Gu Bon-gil	Fencing	Summer	2012, 2020, 2024	3	0	0	3
An San	Archery	Summer	2020	3	0	0	3
Jin Sun-yu	Short track speed skating	Winter	2006	3	0	0	3
Yun Mi-jin	Archery	Summer	2000, 2004	3	0	0	3
Kim Ki-hoon	Short track speed skating	Winter	1992, 1994	3	0	0	3

=== Notes ===
On 11 February 2014, Lee Sang-hwa won the gold medal for the women's 500m longtrack speedskating race at the 2014 Sochi Winter Olympics, having previously won the one at the 2010 Games. She became the third woman and first Korean woman to win back-to-back golds at the 500m.

== Participated event by competition ==
=== Summer Olympics ===
Nation	48	52	56	60	64	68	72	76	84	88	92	96	00	04	08	12	16	20
Archery									•	•	•	•	•	•	•	•	•	
Athletics	•	•	•	•	•	•	•		•	•	•	•	•	•	•	•	•	
Badminton							d			e	•	•	•	•	•	•	•	
Baseball		d	d		d				d	d		•	•		•			
Basketball	•		•		•	•			•	•		•	•	•	•			
Bowling										d								
Boxing	•	•	•	•	•	•	•	•	•	•	•	•	•	•	•	•	•	
Canoeing and kayaking									•	•	•	•	•		•	•	•	
Cycling	•	•	•	•	•	•			•	•	•	•	•	•	•	•	•	
Diving				•	•	•			•	•		•	•		•	•	•	
Equestrian		•		•	•					•	•			•	•		•	
Fencing					•				•	•	•	•	•	•	•	•	•	
Field hockey										•	•	•	•	•	•	•	•	
Football	•				•					•	•	•	•	•	•	•	•	
Golf																	•	
Gymnastics				•	•	•			•	•	•	•	•	•	•	•	•	
Handball									•	•	•	•	•	•	•	•	•	
Judo					•		•	•	•	•	•	•	•	•	•	•	•	
Modern pentathlon					•				•	•	•	•		•	•	•	•	
Rowing					•				•	•	•	•	•	•	•	•	•	
Sailing									•	•	•	•	•	•	•	•	•	
Shooting			•	•	•	•	•	•	•	•	•	•	•	•	•	•	•	
Swimming					•	•	•		•	•	•	•	•	•	•	•	•	
Synchronized swimming										•			•	•		•		
Table tennis										•	•	•	•	•	•	•	•	
Taekwondo										d	d		•	•	•	•	•	
Tennis						d			d	•	•	•	•	•	•			
Triathlon																•		
Volleyball					•	•	•	•	•	•	•	•	•	•		•	•	
Water polo										•								
Weightlifting	•	•	•	•	•	•	•		•	•	•	•	•	•	•	•	•	
Wrestling	•	•	•	•	•	•	•	•	•	•	•	•	•	•	•	•	•	

- d : demonstration sports
- e : exhibition sports

=== Winter Olympics ===
Event	48	56	60	64	68	72	76	80	84	88	92	94	98	02	06	10	14	18	22
Alpine skiing			•	•	•			•	•	•	•	•	•		•	•	•	•	
Biathlon									•	•	•		•	•	•	•	•	•	
Bobsleigh																•	•	•	
Cross country skiing			•	•	•			•	•	•	•	•	•	•	•	•	•	•	
Curling																	•	•	
Figure skating					•	•	•	•	•	•	•	•	•	•		•	•	•	
Freestyle skiing															•	•	•	•	
Ice hockey																		•	
Luge													•	•	•	•	•	•	
Nordic combined																		•	
Short track speed skating										d	•	•	•	•	•	•	•	•	
Skeleton														•	•	•	•	•	
Ski jumping													•	•	•	•	•	•	
Snowboarding																•	•	•	
Speed skating	•	•	•	•	•	•	•	•	•	•	•	•	•	•	•	•	•	•	

- d : demonstration sports

== Hosted Olympic logos and mottos ==
=== 1988 Summer Olympics ===
The 1988 Summer Olympics, held in the capital of Seoul, marked the first time the Olympics were held in South Korea.

The logo consists of a rounded tricolor which represents the Olympic rings. The motto of the games was Harmony and Progress (화합과 전진).

=== 2018 Winter Olympics ===
The 2018 Winter Olympics saw the Olympics return to Korea when it was held in Pyeongchang.

The logo consists of five intertwined wings which represent the continents (Africa, America, Asia, Europe and Oceania). The motto of the games was Passion. Connected. (하나된 열정; Hanadoen, Yeoljeong).

== See also ==
- South Korea at the Paralympics
- List of flag bearers for South Korea at the Olympics
- Category:Olympic competitors for South Korea
- South Korea at the Asian Games
