= Kim Woon-ki =

South Korean biathlete (born 1970)

Personal information
- Nationality: South Korean
- Born: 23 August 1970 (age 54)

Sport
- Sport: Biathlon

Kim Woon-ki (born 23 August 1970) is a South Korean biathlete. He competed in the men's sprint event at the 1992 Winter Olympics.
