= Lee Sung-ae =

South Korean speed skater

Personal information
- Nationality: South Korean
- Born: 2 December 1962 (age 63) Chuncheon, South Korea

Korean name
- Hangul: 이성애
- RR: I Seongae
- MR: I Sŏngae

Sport
- Sport: Speed skating

Lee Sung-ae (Korean: 이성애; born 2 December 1962) is a South Korean speed skater. She competed in three events at the 1980 Winter Olympics.
