= Han Myung-hee =

South Korean biathlete

Personal information
- Nationality: South Korean
- Born: 24 April 1970 (age 54)

Sport
- Sport: Biathlon

Han Myung-hee (born 24 April 1970) is a South Korean biathlete. He competed in the men's 20 km individual event at the 1992 Winter Olympics.
