= Lee Jong-guk =

South Korean speed skater

Personal information
- Nationality: South Korean
- Born: 15 December 1921

Sport
- Sport: Speed skating

Lee Jong-guk (born 15 December 1921) was a South Korean speed skater. He competed in two events at the 1948 Winter Olympics.
