= Choi Nam-yeon =

South Korean speed skater

Personal information
- Nationality: South Korean
- Born: 17 January 1943 (age 82); Seoul, Korea

Sport
- Sport: Speed skating

Choi Nam-yeon (born 17 January 1943) is a South Korean speed skater. He competed in two events at the 1964 Winter Olympics.
