= Jang Dong-lin =

South Korean biathlete

Personal information
- Nationality: South Korean
- Born: 17 April 1968 (age 56)

Sport
- Sport: Biathlon

Jang Dong-lin (born 17 April 1968) is a South Korean biathlete. He competed in the men's 20 km individual event at the 1992 Winter Olympics.
