= An Jin-su =

South Korean handball player (born 1961)

Personal information
- Nationality: South Korean
- Born: 26 December 1961 (age 63)

Sport
- Sport: Handball

An Jin-su (born 26 December 1961) is a South Korean handball player. He competed in the men's tournament at the 1984 Summer Olympics.
