= Jo Yun-sik =

South Korean speed skater

Personal information
- Nationality: South Korean
- Born: 24 July 1931 (age 93)

Sport
- Sport: Speed skating

Jo Yun-sik (born 24 July 1931) is a South Korean speed skater. He competed in two events at the 1956 Winter Olympics.
