= Pyeon Chang-nam =

South Korean speed skater

Personal information
- Nationality: South Korean
- Born: 11 January 1922

Sport
- Sport: Speed skating

Pyeon Chang-nam (born 11 January 1922) was a South Korean speed skater. He competed in two events at the 1956 Winter Olympics.
