= Lee Nam-soon =

South Korean speed skater

Personal information
- Nationality: South Korean
- Born: 14 April 1961 (age 63); Chuncheon, South Korea

Sport
- Sport: Speed skating

Lee Nam-soon (Korean: 이남순; Hanja: 李南順; RR: Yi Namsun, born 14 April 1961) is a South Korean speed skater. She competed at the 1976 Winter Olympics and the 1980 Winter Olympics.
