= Jang Yeong =

South Korean speed skater

Personal information
- Nationality: South Korean
- Born: 12 February 1934 (age 91)

Sport
- Sport: Speed skating

Jang Yeong (born 12 February 1934) is a South Korean speed skater. He competed at the 1956 Winter Olympics and the 1960 Winter Olympics.
