= Kim Gwi-jin =

South Korean speed skater

Personal information
- Nationality: South Korean
- Born: 5 October 1945 (age 79); Seoul, South Korea

Sport
- Sport: Speed skating

Kim Gwi-jin (born 5 October 1945) is a South Korean speed skater. She competed at the 1964 Winter Olympics and the 1968 Winter Olympics.
