= Kim Ha-yun (skier) =

South Korean cross-country skier

Personal information
- Nationality: South Korean

Sport
- Sport: Cross-country skiing

Kim Ha-yun is a South Korean cross-country skier. He competed in the men's 15 kilometre event at the 1960 Winter Olympics.
