= Hwang Byung-dae =

South Korean skier (born 1960)

Personal information
- Nationality: South Korean
- Born: 14 November 1960 (age 64)

Sport
- Sport: Biathlon, cross-country skiing

Hwang Byung-dae (born 14 November 1960) is a South Korean skier. He competed in the 20 km individual event at the 1984 Winter Olympics.
