= Lee Eun-hee (figure skater) =

South Korean figure skater

Personal information
- Nationality: South Korean
- Born: 15 August 1975 (age 51)

Sport
- Sport: Figure skating

Lee Eun-hee (born 15 August 1975) is a South Korean figure skater. She competed in the ladies' singles event at the 1992 Winter Olympics.

Lee finished 8th at the 1989 Grand Prix International St. Gervais. It was only the 2nd time that a Korean figure skater placed top 10 in an international competition of that caliber.
