= Choi Yeong-bae =

South Korean speed skater

Personal information
- Nationality: South Korean
- Born: 9 November 1938 (age 86); Seoul, Korea

Sport
- Sport: Speed skating

Choi Yeong-bae (born 9 November 1938) is a South Korean speed skater. He competed at the 1960 Winter Olympics and the 1964 Winter Olympics.
