= Kang Kwang-bae =

South Korean sportsman

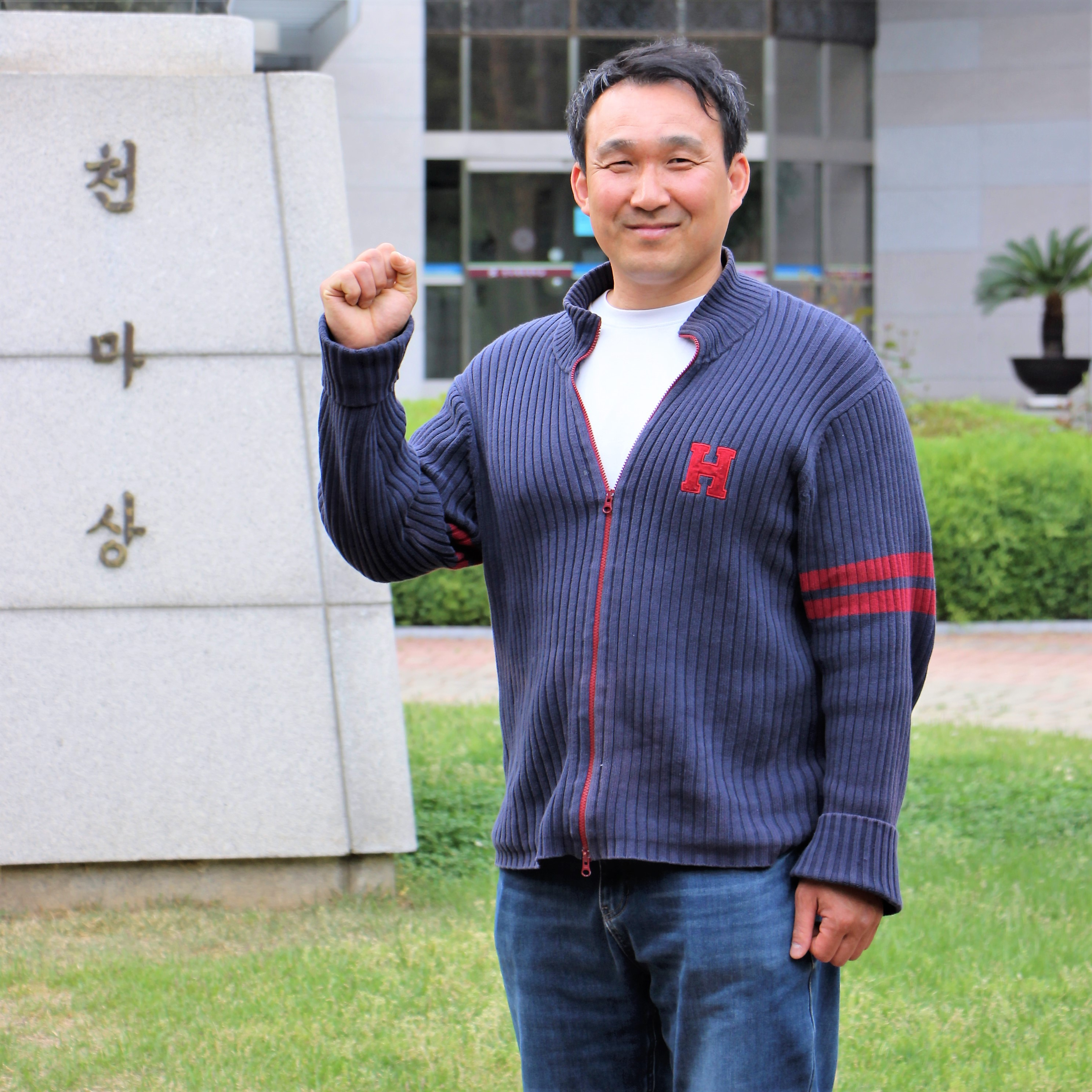

Kang Kwang-bae (Korean: 강광배; Hanja: 姜光倍, born July 29, 1973) is a South Korean retired bobsledder, skeleton racer, and luger. Competing in four Winter Olympics, he earned his best finish of 19th in the four-man bobsleigh event at Vancouver in the 2010 games.

Kang's best finish at the IBSF World Championships was 26th in four-man bobsleigh at Königssee in the 2004 competition.

Kang was flag bearer for South Korea at the 2010 Winter Olympics.
