= Lee Young-ha (speed skater) =

South Korean speed skater

Personal information
- Nationality: South Korean
- Born: 10 November 1956 Seoul, South Korea
- Died: February 25, 2019 (aged 62) Seoul, South Korea

Korean name
- Hangul: 이영하
- RR: I Yeongha
- MR: I Yŏngha

Sport
- Sport: Speed skating

Lee Young-ha (Korean: 이영하; 10 November 1956 – 25 February 2019) was a South Korean speed skater. He competed at the 1976 Winter Olympics, the 1980 Winter Olympics and the 1984 Winter Olympics.

He died in 2019 from gallbladder cancer.
