= Korean Sport & Olympic Committee =

Sports body of South Korea

- Country: South Korea
- Code: KOR
- Created: 1920, as Joseon Sports Council
- Recognized: 1947
- Headquarters: 424, Olympic-ro, Songpa-gu, Seoul, South Korea
- President: Ryu Seung-min
- Secretary General: Choongryul Jeon
- Website: www.sports.or.kr

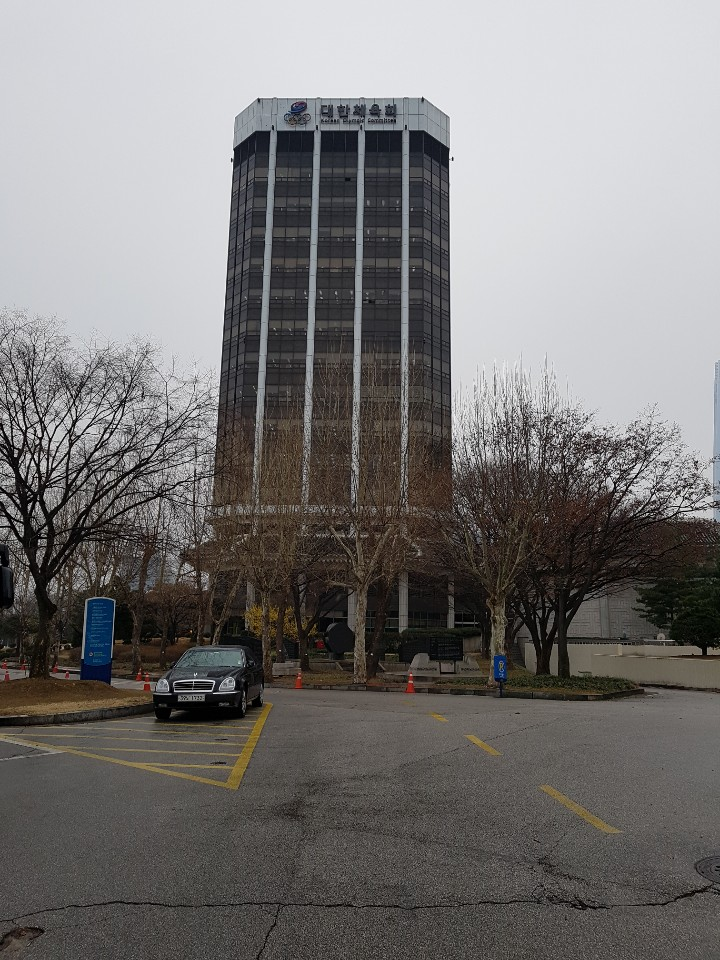
The Korean Sport & Olympic Committee

The Korean Sport & Olympic Committee (Korean: 대한체육회; Hanja: 大韓體育會, abbr. KSOC) is the National Olympic Committee of Republic of Korea (competing as Korea) for the Olympic Games movement and inbound sports issue. It is a non-profit organization that selects players and teams to represent the nation, and raises funds to send them to Olympic events organized by the International Olympic Committee (IOC).

== History ==
The Joseon Sports Council was established on 13 July 1920, and it made Korean national competitions of each sport including All Joseon Football Tournament. The competitions were combined as the All Joseon Sport Games (currently Korean National Sports Festival) in 1934, and the combined competition was held every autumn. However, the Joseon Sports Council was forcibly dissolved by Japan on 4 July 1938, and Korean sporting activities were restricted until the end of the Japanese occupation.

The council was revived after Korean independence in 1945, and joined the IOC on 20 June 1947. It also established the Korean Olympic Committee (KOC) to prepare for the Olympic Games in that year. The council was renamed the Korea Amateur Sports Association (KASA) in 1954, and the Korea Sports Council (KSC) in 1994. The KASA succeeded in hosting the 1988 Summer Olympics in Seoul, and South Korea finished fourth in that edition, which was its best ever result in Olympics. The KOC was merged into the KSC on 24 June 2009, but the organization used KOC as its name. It once again merged with the Korea Council of Sport for All in March 2016, and named the current "Korean Sport & Olympic Committee" in November 2016, but the emblem of the committee is remaining the same as previous.

On 2 November 2018, officials from both North and South Korea announced that their countries would participate at the 2020 Summer Olympics, held in Tokyo, Japan, as a unified team. The officials from both Koreas also announced that the letters they would send to the IOC regarding their bids for hosting the 2032 Summer Olympics would also consist of co-host bids so that the Olympic activities would take place in both nations if their bids were accepted as well.

== Presidents ==
President	Career
Lyuh Woon-hyung	1947
Jung Hwan-bum	1948
Sin Ik-hui	1948–1949
Sin Hung-woo	1949–1951
Jo Ok-Byeng	1951–1952
Lee Ki-poong	1952–1960
Kim Dong-ha	1961–1962
Lee Ju-Il	1962
Lee Hyo	1962–1964
Lee Sang-beck	1964–1966
Chang Ki-young	1966–1968
Min Kwan-sik	1968–1970
Kim Yong-woo	1971
Kim Taek-soo	1974–1976
Park Chong-kyu	1979–1980
Jo Sang-ho	1980–1982
Jung Ju-young	1982–1984
Roh Tae-woo	1984–1985
Kim Jong-ha	1985–1989
Kim Jong-yeol	1989–1993
Kim Un-yong	1993–2002
Lee Yun-taek	2002–2005
Kim Jung-gil	2005–2008
Lee Yun-taek	2008–2009
Park Yong-sung	2009–2013
Kim Jung-haeng	2013–2016
Lee Kee-heung	2016–2025
Ryu Seung-min	2025–present

== IOC members ==
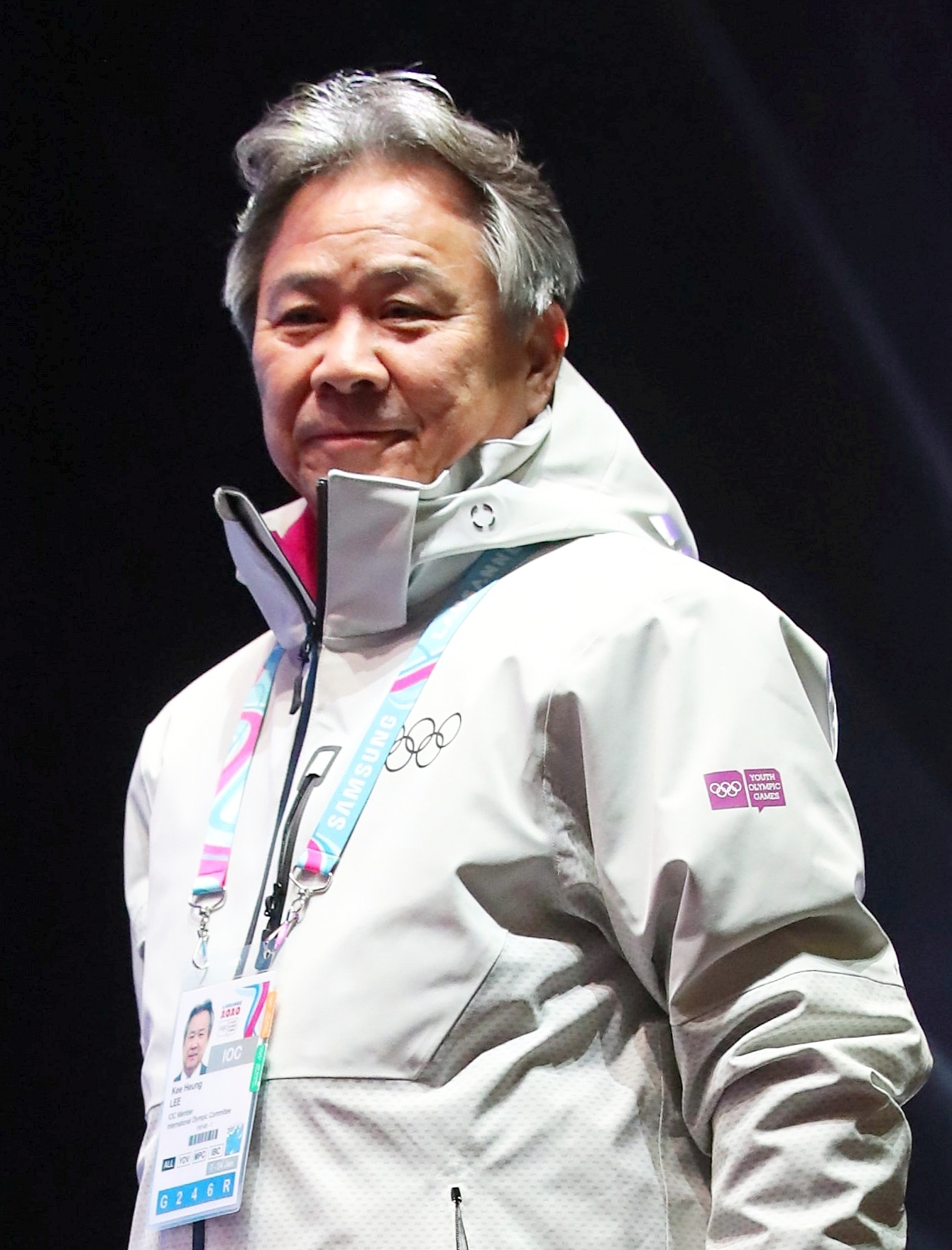
Lee Kee-heung in his function as an IOC member at the 2020 Winter Youth Olympics

Member	Career
Lee Ki-poong	1955–1960
Lee Sang-baek	1964–1960
Chang Ki-young	1967–1977
Kim Taek-soo	1977–1983
Park Chong-kyu	1984–1985
Kim Un-yong	1986–2005
Lee Kun-hee	1996–2017
Park Yong-sung	2002–2007
Moon Dae-sung	2008–2016
Ryu Seung-min	2016–2024
Lee Kee-heung	2019–2025

== Logos ==
Korea Sports Council

Korean Olympic Committee

== Korean Sports Hall of Fame ==
Olympic sports
Non-Olympic sports
Administration

Year	Inductee	Gender	Sport	Title(s)
2011	Sohn Kee-chung	Man	Athletics	Marathon champion at the 1936 Summer Olympics.; First Korean player to win an Olympic gold medal.
2011	Kim Seong-jip	Man	Weightlifting	Light heavyweight champion at the 1954 Asian Games.; First Korean national player to win an Olympic medal.
2014	Suh Yun-bok	Man	Athletics	Champion at the 1947 Boston Marathon.; First Asian player to win a major marathon.
2014	Chang Chang-sun	Man	Wrestling	Freestyle flyweight champion at the 1966 World Wrestling Championships.
2014	Min Kwan-sik	Man	—	KASA president who constructed the Korea National Training Center.
2015	Yang Jung-mo	Man	Wrestling	Freestyle featherweight champion at the 1976 Summer Olympics.; First Korean national player to win an Olympic gold medal.
2015	Park Shin-ja	Woman	Basketball	Most Valuable Player at the 1967 FIBA World Championship for Women.
2015	Kim Un-yong	Man	—	IOC member who contributed to hosting the 1988 Summer Olympics and the 2002 FIFA World Cup in South Korea.
2016	Kim Yuna	Woman	Figure skating	Singles champion at the 2010 Winter Olympics.
2017	Cha Bum-kun	Man	Football	One of champions at the 1979–80 and 1987–88 UEFA Cups.
2018	Kim Jin-ho	Woman	Archery	Champion of both individual and team events at the 1979 and 1983 World Archery Championships.
2018	Kim Il	Man	Professional wrestling	One of WWA World Heavyweight champions.
2019	Um Hong-gil	Man	Mountaineering	Climber who reached 16 highest points including all 14 eight-thousanders.
2020	Jo O-ryeon	Man	Swimming	Champion of both 400 m freestyle and 1500 m freestyle at the 1970 and 1974 Asian Games.
2021	Kim Hong-bin	Man	Mountaineering	First disabled person to reach all 14 eight-thousanders.
2022	Lee Bong-ju	Man	Athletics	Champion at the 2001 Boston Marathon.
2023	Nam Sung-yong	Man	Athletics	One of the first Korean players to win an Olympic medal (alongside Sohn Kee-chung).
2024	Ha Hyung-joo	Man	Judo	Half heavyweight champion at the 1984 Summer Olympics.

== See also ==
- Team Korea
- Korean Paralympic Committee
- Sport in South Korea
- South Korea at the Olympics
- South Korea at the Asian Games
- Ministry of Culture, Sports and Tourism
- Gallup Korea's Athlete of the Year
