= Chronological summary of the 2018 Winter Olympics =

This is a chronological summary of the major events of the 2018 Winter Olympics in Pyeongchang County, South Korea. Two events, the curling mixed doubles tournament and the men's normal hill ski jumping competition, held their preliminary rounds on 8 February. The opening ceremony took place one day later on 9 February. The last day of competition and the closing ceremony was on 25 February.

The games featured 102 events in 15 sports, making it the first Winter Olympics to surpass 100 medal events. Four new disciplines in existing sports were introduced to the Winter Olympic programme in Pyeongchang, including big air snowboarding, mixed doubles curling, mass start speed skating, and mixed team alpine skiing.

A Unified Korea women's ice hockey team competed under a separate IOC country code designation (COR); in all other sports, there was a separate North Korea team and a separate South Korea team. As a result of the suspension of the Russian Olympic Committee due to the Russian doping scandal, Russian athletes competed as "Olympic Athletes from Russia" (OAR) under a neutral flag and with the Olympic anthem playing in any ceremony, in place of the Russian national anthem.

All dates and times are KST (UTC+9)

== Calendar ==
All dates are KST (UTC+9)

OC	Opening ceremony	●	Event competitions	1	Event finals	EG	Exhibition gala	CC	Closing ceremony

February	8th Thu	9th Fri	10th Sat	11th Sun	12th Mon	13th Tue	14th Wed	15th Thu	16th Fri	17th Sat	18th Sun	19th Mon	20th Tue	21st Wed	22nd Thu	23rd Fri	24th Sat	25th Sun	Events
Ceremonies		OC																CC	—N/a
Alpine skiing						1		2	2	1	1			1	2		1		11
Biathlon			1	1	2			2		1	1		1		1	1			11
Bobsleigh											●	1	●	1			●	1	3
Cross-country skiing			1	1		2		1	1	1	1			2			1	1	12
Curling	●	●	●	●	●	1	●	●	●	●	●	●	●	●	●	●	1	1	3
Figure skating		●		●	1		●	1	●	1		●	1	●		1		EG	5
Freestyle skiing		●		1	1			●	1	1	2	●	1	1	1	1			10
Ice hockey			●	●	●	●	●	●	●	●	●	●	●	●	1	●	●	1	2
Luge			●	1	●	1	1	1											4
Nordic combined							1						1		1				3
Short track speed skating			1			1				2			1		3				8
Skeleton								●	1	1									2
Ski jumping	●		1		1				●	1		1							4
Snowboarding			●	1	1	1	1	1	1			●		●	1		3		10
Speed skating			1	1	1	1	1	1	1		1	1		2		1	2		14
Daily medal events	0	0	5	6	7	8	4	9	7	9	6	3	5	7	10	4	8	4	102
Cumulative total	0	0	5	11	18	26	30	39	46	55	61	64	69	76	86	90	98	102	102
February	8th Thu	9th Fri	10th Sat	11th Sun	12th Mon	13th Tue	14th Wed	15th Thu	16th Fri	17th Sat	18th Sun	19th Mon	20th Tue	21st Wed	22nd Thu	23rd Fri	24th Sat	25th Sun	Total events

Medals used in the games

Bronze medal	Silver medal	Gold medal

== Medal table ==
* Host nation (South Korea)

2018 Winter Olympics medal table (Note: Figures in table reflect all official changes in medal standings.)
Rank	NOC	Gold	Silver	Bronze	Total
1	Norway	14	14	11	39
2	Germany	14	10	7	31
3	Canada	11	8	10	29
4	United States	9	8	6	23
5	Netherlands	8	6	6	20
6	Sweden	7	6	1	14
7	South Korea*	5	8	4	17
8	Switzerland	5	6	4	15
9	France	5	4	6	15
10	Austria	5	3	6	14
11	Japan	4	5	4	13
12	Italy	3	2	5	10
13	Olympic Athletes from Russia (Note: Olympic Athletes from Russia was the IOC designation of select Russian athletes permitted to participate in the 2018 Winter Olympics. The designation was instigated following the suspension of the Russian Olympic Committee after the Russian doping scandal.)	2	6	9	17
14	Czech Republic	2	2	3	7
15	Belarus	2	1	0	3
16	China	1	6	2	9
17	Slovakia	1	2	0	3
18	Finland	1	1	4	6
19	Great Britain	1	0	4	5
20	Poland	1	0	1	2
21	Hungary	1	0	0	1
21	Ukraine	1	0	0	1
23	Australia	0	2	1	3
24	Slovenia	0	1	1	2
25	Belgium	0	1	0	1
26	New Zealand	0	0	2	2
26	Spain	0	0	2	2
28	Kazakhstan	0	0	1	1
28	Latvia	0	0	1	1
28	Liechtenstein	0	0	1	1
Totals (30 entries)		103	102	102	307

== Day (−1) — Thursday 8 February ==
Curling

- This was the first day of matches in the round robin stage of the mixed doubles tournament.

Ski jumping

- The qualification round of the men's normal hill individual was held, with Andreas Wellinger of Germany taking the top spot with a total score of 133.5. By participating, Japan's Noriaki Kasai became the first athlete in history to participate in eight different Winter Olympics.

== Day 0 — Friday 9 February ==
Curling

- This was the second day of matches in the round robin stage of the mixed doubles tournament.

Figure skating

- The men's short and the pairs short in the team event were held, with the day finishing with Canada in the lead with 17 points.

Freestyle skiing

- The qualifying rounds of both the men's moguls and the women's moguls took place, with Canada's Mikaël Kingsbury and France's Perrine Laffont taking the top spots, respectively.

Opening ceremony

- The opening ceremony at Pyeongchang Olympic Stadium began at 20:00 KST. Yuna Kim, figure skater gold medalist in 2010 and silver medalist in 2014, lit the Olympic cauldron.

== Day 1 — Saturday 10 February ==
=== Detailed results (day 1) ===
Biathlon

- In the women's sprint, Germany's Laura Dahlmeier recorded a time of 21:06.2 with no penalties to win the gold, Norway's Marte Olsbu had 21:30.4 to win the silver, and Veronika Vítková of the Czech Republic finished in 21:32.0 to win the bronze.

Cross-country skiing

- In the women's skiathlon, Sweden's Charlotte Kalla won the gold with a time of 40:44.9, Marit Bjørgen of Norway was 7.8 seconds back to win the silver, and Krista Pärmäkoski of Finland won the bronze at 10.1 back.

Curling

- This was the third day of matches in the round robin stage of the mixed doubles tournament.

Ice hockey

- This was the first day of matches in the group stage of the women's tournament.

Luge

- The first two runs in the men's singles were held, with Germany's Felix Loch leading at the end of the day with a total time of 1:35.299.

Short track speed skating

- South Korea's Lim Hyo-jun set an Olympic record time of 2:10.485 in the final race of the men's 1500m to win the gold. Sjinkie Knegt of the Netherlands had a time of 2:10.555 to win the silver, and Semion Elistratov of Russia had a time of 2:10.687 to win the bronze.
- In the qualifying heats of the women's 500m, Elise Christie of Great Britain set an Olympic record time of 42.872, only to be beaten in a later heat by South Korea's Choi Min-jeong by 0.002 seconds.
- In the qualifying heats of the women's 3000m relay were held, the South Korean team set an Olympic record time of 4:06.387, which was then beaten by China with a time of 4:05.315.

Ski jumping

- In the final of the men's normal hill individual, Andreas Wellinger of Germany won the gold finishing with a total score of 259.1. Johann André Forfang of Norway finished second with 250.9 points and Robert Johansson finished third with 249.7 points.

Snowboarding

- The qualification round of the men's slopestyle were held, with Norway's Marcus Kleveland and Canada's Maxence Parrot winning the two heats with times of 83.71 and 87.36, respectively.

Speed skating

- The Netherlands had a podium sweep, winning all three medals in the women's 3000m: Carlijn Achtereekte finished first with a time of 3:59.21, Ireen Wüst was second at 0.08 back, and Antoinette de Jong was third at 0.81 back.

=== Summary table (day 1) ===
Sport	Event	Gold medalist(s)			Silver medalist(s)		Bronze medalist(s)		Ref
Sport	Event	Competitor(s)	NOC	Rec	Competitor(s)	NOC	Competitor(s)	NOC	Ref
Biathlon	Women's sprint	Laura Dahlmeier	Germany		Marte Olsbu	Norway	Veronika Vítková	Czech Republic	
Cross-country skiing	Women's skiathlon	Charlotte Kalla	Sweden		Marit Bjørgen	Norway	Krista Pärmäkoski	Finland	
Short track speed skating	Men's 1500 m	Lim Hyo-jun	South Korea	OR	Sjinkie Knegt	Netherlands	Semion Elistratov	Olympic Athletes from Russia	
Ski jumping	Men's normal hill individual	Andreas Wellinger	Germany		Johann André Forfang	Norway	Robert Johansson	Norway	
Speed skating	Women's 3000 m	Carlijn Achtereekte	Netherlands		Ireen Wüst	Netherlands	Antoinette de Jong	Netherlands	

== Day 2 — Sunday 11 February ==
=== Detailed results (day 2) ===
Alpine skiing

- The men's downhill was originally scheduled to take place, but was postponed until Thursday 15 February due to high winds.

Biathlon

- In the men's sprint, Germany's Arnd Peiffer recorded a time of 23:38.8 with no penalties to win the gold, Michal Krčmář of the Czech Republic had 23:43.2 to win the silver, and Dominik Windisch of Italy finished at 23:46.5 to win the bronze.

Cross-country skiing

- In the men's skiathlon, Norway completed a podium sweep, with Simen Hegstad Krüger (1:16:20.0), Martin Johnsrud Sundby (1:16:28.0) and Hans Christer Holund (1:16:29.9) winning the gold, silver and bronze respectively.

Curling

- The mixed doubles tournament:
  - The fourth and final day of the round robin stage.
  - Tie-breaker match: China 7–9 Norway

Figure skating

- The ice dancing short, the ladies' short, and the pairs free program in the team event were held. The day finished with Canada leading with 45 points. Russian Evgenia Medvedeva set a new best score of 81.06 in the ladies' short program.

Freestyle skiing

- In final medal round of the women's moguls, France's Perrine Laffont won the gold with a score of 78.65, Canada's Justine Dufour-Lapointe won the silver with a score of 78.56, and Yuliya Galysheva of Kazakhstan won the bronze with a score of 77.40.

Ice hockey

- This was the second day of matches in the group stage of the women's tournament.

Luge

- In the men's singles, Austria's David Gleirscher had a total time of 3:10.702 to win the gold, Chris Mazdzer of the United States was 0.026 back to finish in second, and Germany's Johannes Ludwig was 0.230 back to win the bronze.

Snowboarding

- In the men's slopestyle, Redmond Gerard of the United States won the gold (87.16), Canada's Maxence Parrot won the silver (86.00), and Canada's Mark McMorris won the bronze (85.20).
- The qualification round of the women's slopestyle was cancelled due to high winds. All competitors will compete in a two-run final round instead of the typical two-run qualification round and three-run final round.

Speed skating

- In the men's 5000m, Sven Kramer of the Netherlands set an Olympic record time of 6:09.76 to win the gold. Canada's Ted-Jan Bloemen finished at 6:11.616 to win the silver and Norway's Sverre Lunde Pedersen finished at 6:11.618 to win the bronze.

=== Summary table (day 2) ===
Sport	Event	Gold medalist(s)			Silver medalist(s)		Bronze medalist(s)		Ref
Sport	Event	Competitor(s)	NOC	Rec	Competitor(s)	NOC	Competitor(s)	NOC	Ref
Alpine skiing	Men's downhill	Event postponed until 15 February							
Biathlon	Men's sprint	Arnd Peiffer	Germany		Michal Krčmář	Czech Republic	Dominik Windisch	Italy	
Cross-country skiing	Men's skiathlon	Simen Hegstad Krüger	Norway		Martin Johnsrud Sundby	Norway	Hans Christer Holund	Norway	
Freestyle skiing	Women's moguls	Perrine Laffont	France		Justine Dufour-Lapointe	Canada	Yuliya Galysheva	Kazakhstan	
Luge	Men's singles	David Gleirscher	Austria		Chris Mazdzer	United States	Johannes Ludwig	Germany	
Snowboarding	Men's slopestyle	Redmond Gerard	United States		Max Parrot	Canada	Mark McMorris	Canada	
Speed skating	Men's 5000 m	Sven Kramer	Netherlands	OR	Ted-Jan Bloemen	Canada	Sverre Lunde Pedersen	Norway	

== Day 3 — Monday 12 February ==
=== Detailed results (day 3) ===
Alpine skiing

- The women's giant slalom was originally scheduled to take place, but was postponed until Thursday 15 February due to high winds.

Biathlon

- The men's pursuit was won by Martin Fourcade of France in a time of 32:51.7 with one penalty round, while silver went to Sebastian Samuelsson of Sweden with a time of 33:03.7 and one penalty round, and bronze went to Benedikt Doll of Germany with a time of 33:06.8 and one penalty round.
- The women's pursuit was won by Laura Dahlmeier of Germany, the winner of the sprint event, in a time of 30:35.3 with one penalty round, while silver went to Anastasiya Kuzmina of Slovakia with a time of 31:04.7 and four penalty rounds, and bronze went to Anaïs Bescond of France with a time of 31:04.9 and one penalty round.

Curling

- The mixed doubles tournament semi-finals:
  - Canada 8–4 Norway
  - Switzerland 7–5 Olympic Athletes from Russia

Figure skating

- The final day of the team event was held, featuring the men's free program, the ladies' free program, and the ice dancing free program. Canada won the gold with 73 points, the Olympic Athletes from Russia won the silver with 66 points, and the United States won the bronze with 62 points.

Freestyle skiing

- The final rounds of the men's moguls. Mikaël Kingsbury of Canada scored 86.63 to win the gold, Matt Graham of Australia won the silver with a score of 82.57, and Japan's Daichi Hara won the bronze with an 82.19 score.

Ice hockey

- The third day of matches in the group stage of the women's tournament.

Luge

- The first two runs in the women's singles were held, with Germany's Natalie Geisenberger leading at the end of the day with a total time of 1:32.454.

Ski jumping

- The women's normal hill individual was won by Norway's Maren Lundby with 264.6 points, while silver went to Katharina Althaus of Germany with 252.6 points, and bronze went to Japan's Sara Takanashi with 243.8 points.

Snowboarding

- Under the women's slopestyle two-run final round that was held due to the high winds on the previous day, Jamie Anderson of the United States recorded a score of 83.00 to win the gold, Laurie Blouin of Canada won the silver with a 76.33 score, and Finland's Enni Rukajärvi had a 75.38 to finish with the bronze.
- The qualification round of the women's halfpipe was held, with Chloe Kim (United States) recording the best score of 95.50.

Speed skating

- The women's 1500 m was won by Ireen Wüst of the Netherlands in a time of 1:54.35. Silver went to Japan's Miho Takagi in a time of 1:54.55, while bronze went to Marrit Leenstra of the Netherlands in a time of 1:55.26.

=== Summary table (day 3) ===
Sport	Event	Gold medalist(s)			Silver medalist(s)		Bronze medalist(s)		Ref
Sport	Event	Competitor(s)	NOC	Rec	Competitor(s)	NOC	Competitor(s)	NOC	Ref
Alpine skiing	Women's giant slalom	Event postponed until 15 February							
Biathlon	Men's pursuit	Martin Fourcade	France		Sebastian Samuelsson	Sweden	Benedikt Doll	Germany	
Biathlon	Women's pursuit	Laura Dahlmeier	Germany		Anastasiya Kuzmina	Slovakia	Anaïs Bescond	France	
Figure skating	Team event	Patrick Chan; Kaetlyn Osmond; Gabrielle Daleman; Meagan Duhamel; Eric Radford; Tessa Virtue; Scott Moir	Canada		Mikhail Kolyada; Evgenia Medvedeva; Alina Zagitova; Evgenia Tarasova; Vladimir Morozov; Natalia Zabiiako; Alexander Enbert; Ekaterina Bobrova; Dmitri Soloviev	Olympic Athletes from Russia	Nathan Chen; Adam Rippon; Bradie Tennell; Mirai Nagasu; Alexa Scimeca Knierim; Chris Knierim; Maia Shibutani; Alex Shibutani	United States	
Freestyle skiing	Men's moguls	Mikaël Kingsbury	Canada		Matt Graham	Australia	Daichi Hara	Japan	
Ski jumping	Women's normal hill individual	Maren Lundby	Norway		Katharina Althaus	Germany	Sara Takanashi	Japan	
Snowboarding	Women's slopestyle	Jamie Anderson	United States		Laurie Blouin	Canada	Enni Rukajärvi	Finland	
Speed skating	Women's 1500 m	Ireen Wüst	Netherlands		Miho Takagi	Japan	Marrit Leenstra	Netherlands	

== Day 4 — Tuesday 13 February ==
=== Detailed results (day 4) ===
Alpine skiing

- The men's combined was won by Austria's Marcel Hirscher in a time of 2:06.52. Silver and bronze went to Alexis Pinturault and Victor Muffat-Jeandet of France with times of 2:06.75 and 2:07.54, respectively.

Cross-country skiing

- The men's individual sprint was won by Norway's Johannes Høsflot Klæbo in a time of 3:05.75, followed by Italy's Federico Pellegrino with a time of 3:07.09 and Aleksandr Bolshunov of the Olympic Athletes from Russia with a time of 3:07.11.
- The women's individual sprint was won by Sweden's Stina Nilsson in a time of 3:03.84, followed by Norway's Maiken Caspersen Falla with a time of 3:06.87 and Yulia Belorukova of the Olympic Athletes from Russia with a time of 3:07.21.

Curling

- The mixed doubles tournament:
  - Bronze medal game: Olympic Athletes from Russia 8–4 Norway
    - The Russian team would later be stripped of their bronze medals on 22 February, after Aleksandr Krushelnitskiy failed a doping test. The medals were then awarded to the Norwegian team instead.
  - Gold medal game: Canada 10–3 Switzerland

Ice hockey

- The fourth day of matches in the group stage of the women's tournament.

Luge

- The final runs in the women's singles were won by Germany's Natalie Geisenberger in a time of 3:05.232, ahead of fellow German Dajana Eitberger with a time of 3:05.599 and Alex Gough of Canada with a time of 3:05.644.

Short track speed skating

- The final heats of the women's 500 m were won by Arianna Fontana of Italy in a time of 42.569. Silver went to Yara van Kerkhof of the Netherlands with a time of 43.256, while bronze went to Canada's Kim Boutin with a time of 43.881.
- The qualifying heats of the men's 1000 m were held. Canada's Charles Hamelin set a new Olympic record time of 1:23.407.
- The qualifying heats of the men's 5000 m relay took place. The South Korean team qualified for the final in the fastest time, setting an Olympic record of 6:34.510.

Snowboarding

- The finals of the women's halfpipe were won by Chloe Kim of the United States with a score of 98.25. Silver went to China's Liu Jiayu with a score of 89.75, while bronze went to Arielle Gold of the United States with a score of 85.75.
- The qualification round of the men's halfpipe.

Speed skating

- The men's 1500 m was won by Kjeld Nuis of the Netherlands in a time of 1:44.01, followed by his compatriot Patrick Roest with a time of 1:44.86 and South Korea's Kim Min-seok with a time of 1:44.93.

=== Summary table (day 4) ===
Sport	Event	Gold medalist(s)			Silver medalist(s)		Bronze medalist(s)		Ref
Sport	Event	Competitor(s)	NOC	Rec	Competitor(s)	NOC	Competitor(s)	NOC	Ref
Alpine skiing	Men's combined	Marcel Hirscher	Austria		Alexis Pinturault	France	Victor Muffat-Jeandet	France	
Cross-country skiing	Men's individual sprint	Johannes Høsflot Klæbo	Norway		Federico Pellegrino	Italy	Aleksandr Bolshunov	Olympic Athletes from Russia	
Cross-country skiing	Women's individual sprint	Stina Nilsson	Sweden		Maiken Caspersen Falla	Norway	Yulia Belorukova	Olympic Athletes from Russia	
Curling	Mixed doubles tournament	Kaitlyn Lawes; John Morris	Canada		Jenny Perret; Martin Rios	Switzerland	Kristin Skaslien; Magnus Nedregotten	Norway (Note: Awarded after the original medalist(s) were disqualified for doping.)	
Luge	Women's singles	Natalie Geisenberger	Germany		Dajana Eitberger	Germany	Alex Gough	Canada	
Short track speed skating	Women's 500 m	Arianna Fontana	Italy		Yara van Kerkhof	Netherlands	Kim Boutin	Canada	
Snowboarding	Women's halfpipe	Chloe Kim	United States		Liu Jiayu	China	Arielle Gold	United States	
Speed skating	Men's 1500 m	Kjeld Nuis	Netherlands		Patrick Roest	Netherlands	Kim Min-seok	South Korea	

== Day 5 — Wednesday 14 February ==
=== Detailed results (day 5) ===
Alpine skiing

- The women's slalom was originally scheduled to take place, but was postponed to Friday 16 February due to high winds.

Biathlon

- The women's individual was originally scheduled to take place, but was postponed to Thursday 15 February due to high winds.

Curling

- The first day of matches in the round robin stage of the men's tournament.
- The first day of matches in the round robin stage of the women's tournament.

Figure skating

- The pairs skating short program took place, with the Chinese pair of Wenjing Sui and Cong Han leading at this stage with a score of 82.89.

Ice hockey

- The first day of matches in the group stage of the men's tournament.
- The fourth day of matches in the group stage of the women's tournament.

Luge

- The doubles were won by Tobias Wendl and Tobias Arlt of Germany in a time of 1:31.697, followed by Peter Penz and Georg Fischler of Austria with a time of 1:31.785, and Toni Eggert and Sascha Benecken of Germany with a time of 1:31.987.

Nordic combined

- The individual normal hill/10 km was won by Germany's Eric Frenzel in a time of 24:51.4, ahead of Japan's Akito Watabe with a time of 24:56.2 and Austria's Lukas Klapfer with a time of 25:09.5.

Snowboarding

- The finals of the men's halfpipe was won by Shaun White of the United States with a score of 97.75. Silver went to Japan's Ayumu Hirano with a score of 95.25, while bronze went to Australia's Scott James with a score of 92.00.

Speed skating

- The women's 1000 m was won by Jorien ter Mors of the Netherlands in an Olympic record time of 1:13.56. Silver went to Japan's Nao Kodaira with a time of 1:13.82, while bronze went to her compatriot Miho Takagi with a time of 1:13.98.

=== Summary table (day 5) ===
Sport	Event	Gold medalist(s)			Silver medalist(s)		Bronze medalist(s)		Ref
Sport	Event	Competitor(s)	NOC	Rec	Competitor(s)	NOC	Competitor(s)	NOC	Ref
Alpine skiing	Women's slalom	Event postponed until 16 February							
Biathlon	Women's individual	Event postponed until 15 February							
Luge	Doubles	Tobias Wendl; Tobias Arlt	Germany		Peter Penz; Georg Fischler	Austria	Toni Eggert; Sascha Benecken	Germany	
Nordic combined	Individual normal hill/10 km	Eric Frenzel	Germany		Akito Watabe	Japan	Lukas Klapfer	Austria	
Snowboarding	Men's halfpipe	Shaun White	United States		Ayumu Hirano	Japan	Scott James	Australia	
Speed skating	Women's 1000 m	Jorien ter Mors	Netherlands	OR	Nao Kodaira	Japan	Miho Takagi	Japan	

== Day 6 — Thursday 15 February ==
=== Detailed results (day 6) ===
Alpine skiing

- Because of high winds on Sunday 11 February, the men's downhill was moved to this day. The race was won by Norway's Aksel Lund Svindal in a time of 1:40.25, followed by his compatriot Kjetil Jansrud with a time of 1:40.37, and Beat Feuz of Switzerland with a time of 1:40.43.
- The men's super-G, originally scheduled on this day, was postponed to Friday 16 February to make room for the men's downhill competition.
- Because of high winds on Monday 12 February, the women's giant slalom was moved to this day. The race was won by Mikaela Shiffrin of the United States in a time of 2:20.02, followed by Norway's Ragnhild Mowinckel with a time of 2:20.41, and Italy's Federica Brignone with a time of 2:20.48.

Biathlon

- The men's individual was won by Johannes Thingnes Bø of Norway in a time of 48:03.8 with two penalties, followed by Slovenia's Jakov Fak with a time of 48:09.3 and no penalties, and Austria's Dominik Landertinger with a time of 48:18.0 and no penalties.
- The women's individual was moved to this day due to high winds on the original day (Wednesday 14 February). Gold went to Hanna Öberg of Sweden with a time of 41:07.2 and no penalties. Silver went to Slovakia's Anastasiya Kuzmina with a time of 41:31.9 and two penalties, while bronze went to Germany's Laura Dahlmeier with a time of 41:48.4 and one penalty.

Cross-country skiing

- The women's 10 km freestyle was won by Ragnhild Haga of Norway in a time of 25:00.5. Silver went to Sweden's Charlotte Kalla with a time of 25:20.8, while bronze was shared by Norway's Marit Bjørgen and Finland's Krista Pärmäkoski with an identical time of 25:32.4.

Curling

- The second day of matches in the round robin stage of the men's tournament.
- The second day of matches in the round robin stage of the women's tournament.

Figure skating

- The pairs skating free program was won by Aljona Savchenko and Bruno Massot of Germany with a score of 235.90. Silver went to Sui Wenjing and Han Cong of China with a score of 235.47, while bronze went to Meagan Duhamel and Eric Radford of Canada with a score of 230.15.

Freestyle skiing

- The qualifying rounds of the women's aerials took place. The best qualifying score came from Alla Tsuper of Belarus, with a score of 99.37.

Ice hockey

- The second day of matches in the group stage of the men's tournament.
- The fifth day of matches in the group stage of the women's tournament.

Luge

- The team relay was won by the German team in a time of 2:24.517, followed by the Canadian team with a time of 2:24.872 and the Austrian team with a time of 2:24.988.

Skeleton

- The first two runs of the men's skeleton took place, with Yun Sung-bin (South Korea) leading at this stage with a total time of 1:40.35.

Snowboarding

- The men's snowboard cross final was won by Pierre Vaultier of France, ahead of Australia's Jarryd Hughes and Spain's Regino Hernández.

Speed skating

- The men's 10,000 m was won by Ted-Jan Bloemen of Canada with an Olympic record time of 12:39.77. Silver went to Jorrit Bergsma of the Netherlands with a time of 12:41.98, while bronze went to Italy's Nicola Tumolero with a time of 12:54.32.

=== Summary table (day 6) ===
Sport	Event	Gold medalist(s)			Silver medalist(s)		Bronze medalist(s)		Ref
Sport	Event	Competitor(s)	NOC	Rec	Competitor(s)	NOC	Competitor(s)	NOC	Ref
Alpine skiing	Men's super-G	Event postponed until 16 February							
Alpine skiing	Men's downhill	Aksel Lund Svindal	Norway		Kjetil Jansrud	Norway	Beat Feuz	Switzerland	
Alpine skiing	Women's giant slalom	Mikaela Shiffrin	United States		Ragnhild Mowinckel	Norway	Federica Brignone	Italy	
Biathlon	Men's individual	Johannes Thingnes Bø	Norway		Jakov Fak	Slovenia	Dominik Landertinger	Austria	
Biathlon	Women's individual	Hanna Öberg	Sweden		Anastasiya Kuzmina	Slovakia	Laura Dahlmeier	Germany	
Cross-country skiing	Women's 10 km freestyle	Ragnhild Haga	Norway		Charlotte Kalla	Sweden	Marit Bjørgen	Norway	
Cross-country skiing	Women's 10 km freestyle	Ragnhild Haga	Norway		Charlotte Kalla	Sweden	Krista Pärmäkoski	Finland	
Figure skating	Pairs skating	Aljona Savchenko; Bruno Massot	Germany		Sui Wenjing; Han Cong	China	Meagan Duhamel; Eric Radford	Canada	
Luge	Team relay	Natalie Geisenberger; Johannes Ludwig; Tobias Wendl; Tobias Arlt	Germany		Alex Gough; Samuel Edney; Tristan Walker; Justin Snith	Canada	Madeleine Egle; David Gleirscher; Peter Penz; Georg Fischler	Austria	
Snowboarding	Men's snowboard cross	Pierre Vaultier	France		Jarryd Hughes	Australia	Regino Hernández	Spain	
Speed skating	Men's 10,000 m	Ted-Jan Bloemen	Canada	OR	Jorrit Bergsma	Netherlands	Nicola Tumolero	Italy	

== Day 7 — Friday 16 February ==
=== Detailed results (day 7) ===
Alpine skiing

- The men's super-G was moved to this day due to the rescheduling of the men's downhill competition. It was won by Matthias Mayer of Austria in a time of 1:24.44. Silver went to Switzerland's Beat Feuz with a time of 1:24.57, while bronze went to Norway's Kjetil Jansrud with a time of 1:24.62.
- The women's slalom was moved to this day due to high winds on the original day (Wednesday 14 February). It was won by Frida Hansdotter of Sweden in a time of 1:38.63, ahead of Switzerland's Wendy Holdener with a time of 1:38.68 and Austria's Katharina Gallhuber with a time of 1:38.95.

Cross-country skiing

- The men's 15 km freestyle was won by Dario Cologna of Switzerland in a time of 33:43.9, followed by Norway's Simen Hegstad Krüger with a time of 34:02.2 and Denis Spitsov of the Olympic Athletes from Russia with a time of 34:06.9.

Curling

- The third day of matches in the round robin stage of the men's tournament.
- The third day of matches in the round robin stage of the women's tournament.

Figure skating

- The men's singles short program.

Freestyle skiing

- The finals of the women's aerials were won by Hanna Huskova of Belarus with a score of 96.14. Silver went to China's Zhang Xin with a score of 95.52, while bronze went to her compatriot Kong Fanyu with a score of 70.14.

Ice hockey

- The third day of matches in the group stage of the men's tournament.

Skeleton

- The final two runs of the men's skeleton. The event was won by Yun Sung-bin of South Korea in a time of 3:20.55, followed by Nikita Tregubov of the Olympic Athletes from Russia with a time of 3:22.18 and Dominic Parsons of Great Britain with a time of 3:22.20.
- The first two runs of the women's skeleton.

Ski jumping

- The qualification round of the men's large hill individual.

Snowboarding

- The women's snowboard cross was won by Michela Moioli of Italy. Silver went to France's Julia Pereira de Sousa Mabileau, while bronze went to Eva Samková of the Czech Republic.

Speed skating

- The women's 5000 m was won by Esmee Visser of the Netherlands in a time of 6:50.23, ahead of Martina Sáblíková of the Czech Republic with a time of 6:51.85 and Natalya Voronina of the Olympic Athletes from Russia with a time of 6:53.98.

=== Summary table (day 7) ===
Sport	Event	Gold medalist(s)			Silver medalist(s)		Bronze medalist(s)		Ref
Sport	Event	Competitor(s)	NOC	Rec	Competitor(s)	NOC	Competitor(s)	NOC	Ref
Alpine skiing	Men's super-G	Matthias Mayer	Austria		Beat Feuz	Switzerland	Kjetil Jansrud	Norway	
Alpine skiing	Women's slalom	Frida Hansdotter	Sweden		Wendy Holdener	Switzerland	Katharina Gallhuber	Austria	
Cross-country skiing	Men's 15 km freestyle	Dario Cologna	Switzerland		Simen Hegstad Krüger	Norway	Denis Spitsov	Olympic Athletes from Russia	
Freestyle skiing	Women's aerials	Hanna Huskova	Belarus		Zhang Xin	China	Kong Fanyu	China	
Skeleton	Men's	Yun Sung-bin	South Korea		Nikita Tregubov	Olympic Athletes from Russia	Dominic Parsons	Great Britain	
Snowboarding	Women's snowboard cross	Michela Moioli	Italy		Julia Pereira de Sousa Mabileau	France	Eva Samková	Czech Republic	
Speed skating	Women's 5000 m	Esmee Visser	Netherlands		Martina Sáblíková	Czech Republic	Natalya Voronina	Olympic Athletes from Russia	

== Day 8 — Saturday 17 February ==
=== Detailed results (day 8) ===
Alpine skiing

- The women's super-G was won by Ester Ledecká of the Czech Republic in a time of 1:21.11, ahead of Austria's Anna Veith with a time of 1:21.12 and Liechtenstein's Tina Weirather with a time of 1:21.22.

Biathlon

- The women's mass start was won by Anastasiya Kuzmina of Slovakia with a time of 35:23.0. Darya Domracheva of Belarus was 18.8 back to win silver and Tiril Eckhoff of Norway was 27.7 back to win the bronze.

Cross-country skiing

- The women's 4 × 5 km relay was won by the Norwegian team in a time of 51:24.3, ahead of Sweden with a time of 51:26.3 and the Olympic Athletes from Russia with a time of 52:07.6.

Curling

- The fourth day of matches in the round robin stage of the men's tournament.
- The fourth day of matches in the round robin stage of the women's tournament.

Figure skating

- The men's singles free program. The competition was won by Yuzuru Hanyu of Japan with a score of 317.85. Silver went to his compatriot Shoma Uno with a score of 306.90, while bronze went to Spain's Javier Fernández with a score of 305.24.

Freestyle skiing

- The women's slopestyle was won by Sarah Höfflin of Switzerland with a score of 91.20. Silver went to her compatriot Mathilde Gremaud with a score of 88.00, while bronze went to Great Britain's Isabel Atkin with a score of 84.60.
- The qualifying rounds of the men's aerials took place, with the Olympic Athlete from Russia Ilia Burov recording the best qualifying score of 126.55.

Ice hockey

- The women's tournament quarter-finals:
  - Olympic Athletes from Russia 6–2 Switzerland
  - Finland 7–2 Sweden
- The fourth day of matches in the group stage of the men's tournament.

Short track speed skating

- Canada's Samuel Girard won the final of the men's 1000 m with a time of 1:24.650 to the gold. John-Henry Krueger of the United States finished second with 1:24.864, and South Korea's Seo Yi-ra finished third at 1:31.619.
- The final of the women's 1500 m was won by South Korea's Choi Min-jeong with a time of 2:24.948. China's Li Jinyu finished second at 2:25.703 and Canada's Kim Boutin finished third at 2:25.834.

Skeleton

- Lizzy Yarnold of Great Britain won the gold in the women's skeleton with a total time of 3:27.28. Germany's Jacqueline Lölling was second with a total time of 3:27.73, and Great Britain's Laura Deas was third with 3:27.90.

Ski jumping

- The final round of the men's large hill individual was won by Kamil Stoch of Poland with a total score of 285.7. Germany's Andreas Wellinger won the silver with a score of 282.3 and Robert Johansson of Norway had a total of 275.3 to win the bronze.

=== Summary table (day 8) ===
Sport	Event	Gold medalist(s)			Silver medalist(s)		Bronze medalist(s)		Ref
Sport	Event	Competitor(s)	NOC	Rec	Competitor(s)	NOC	Competitor(s)	NOC	Ref
Alpine skiing	Women's super-G	Ester Ledecká	Czech Republic		Anna Veith	Austria	Tina Weirather	Liechtenstein	
Biathlon	Women's mass start	Anastasiya Kuzmina	Slovakia		Darya Domracheva	Belarus	Tiril Eckhoff	Norway	
Cross-country skiing	Women's 4 × 5 km relay	Ingvild Flugstad Østberg; Astrid Uhrenholdt Jacobsen; Ragnhild Haga; Marit Bjørgen	Norway		Anna Haag; Charlotte Kalla; Ebba Andersson; Stina Nilsson	Sweden	Natalia Nepryaeva; Yulia Belorukova; Anastasia Sedova; Anna Nechaevskaya	Olympic Athletes from Russia	
Figure skating	Men's singles	Yuzuru Hanyu	Japan		Shoma Uno	Japan	Javier Fernández	Spain	
Freestyle skiing	Women's slopestyle	Sarah Höfflin	Switzerland		Mathilde Gremaud	Switzerland	Isabel Atkin	Great Britain	
Short track speed skating	Men's 1000 m	Samuel Girard	Canada		John-Henry Krueger	United States	Seo Yi-ra	South Korea	
Short track speed skating	Women's 1500 m	Choi Min-jeong	South Korea		Li Jinyu	China	Kim Boutin	Canada	
Skeleton	Women's	Lizzy Yarnold	Great Britain		Jacqueline Lölling	Germany	Laura Deas	Great Britain	
Ski jumping	Men's large hill individual	Kamil Stoch	Poland		Andreas Wellinger	Germany	Robert Johansson	Norway	

== Day 9 — Sunday 18 February ==
=== Detailed results (day 9) ===
Alpine skiing

- The men's giant slalom was won by Marcel Hirscher of Austria in a time of 2:18.04. Silver went to Norway's Henrik Kristoffersen with a time of 2:19.31, while bronze went to France's Alexis Pinturault with a time of 2:19.35.

Biathlon

- The men's mass start was won by Martin Fourcade of France in a photo finish ahead of Germany's Simon Schempp, both with a time of 35:47.3. Bronze went to Norway's Emil Hegle Svendsen with a time of 35:58.5.

Bobsleigh

- The first two runs of the two-man took place, with Germany's Nico Walther and Christian Poser leading at this stage with a total time of 1:38.39.

Cross-country skiing

- The men's 4 × 10 km relay was won by the Norwegian team in a time of 1:33:04.9, ahead of the Olympic Athletes from Russia with a time of 1:33:14.3 and France with a time of 1:33:41.8.

Curling

- The fifth day of matches in the round robin stage of the men's tournament.
- The fifth day of matches in the round robin stage of the women's tournament.

Freestyle skiing

- The men's slopestyle was won by Øystein Bråten of Norway with a score of 95.00. Silver went to Nick Goepper of the United States with a score of 93.60. The bronze medal went to Alex Beaulieu-Marchand of Canada with a score of 92.40.
- The finals of the men's aerials were won by Oleksandr Abramenko of Ukraine with a score of 128.51. Silver went to China's Jia Zongyang with a score of 128.05, while bronze went to Ilya Burov of the Olympic Athletes from Russia with a score of 122.17.

Ice hockey

- The women's tournament 5–8th place semi-finals:
  - Switzerland 2–0 Korea
  - Sweden 1–2 Japan
- The fifth day of matches in the group stage of the men's tournament.

Speed skating

- The qualification heats of the men's team pursuit took place, with the South Korean team recording the best time of 3:38.29.
- The women's 500 m was won by Nao Kodaira of Japan in an Olympic record time of 36.94. Silver went to South Korea's Lee Sang-hwa with a time of 37.33, while bronze went to the Czech Republic's Karolína Erbanová with a time of 37.34.

=== Summary table (day 9) ===
Sport	Event	Gold medalist(s)			Silver medalist(s)		Bronze medalist(s)		Ref
Sport	Event	Competitor(s)	NOC	Rec	Competitor(s)	NOC	Competitor(s)	NOC	Ref
Alpine skiing	Men's giant slalom	Marcel Hirscher	Austria		Henrik Kristoffersen	Norway	Alexis Pinturault	France	
Biathlon	Men's mass start	Martin Fourcade	France		Simon Schempp	Germany	Emil Hegle Svendsen	Norway	
Cross-country skiing	Men's 4 × 10 km relay	Didrik Tønseth; Martin Johnsrud Sundby; Simen Hegstad Krüger; Johannes Høsflot Klæbo	Norway		Andrey Larkov; Aleksandr Bolshunov; Aleksey Chervotkin; Denis Spitsov	Olympic Athletes from Russia	Jean-Marc Gaillard; Maurice Manificat; Clément Parisse; Adrien Backscheider	France	
Freestyle skiing	Men's slopestyle	Øystein Bråten	Norway		Nick Goepper	United States	Alex Beaulieu-Marchand	Canada	
Freestyle skiing	Men's aerials	Oleksandr Abramenko	Ukraine		Jia Zongyang	China	Ilya Burov	Olympic Athletes from Russia	
Speed skating	Women's 500 m	Nao Kodaira	Japan	OR	Lee Sang-hwa	South Korea	Karolína Erbanová	Czech Republic	

== Day 10 — Monday 19 February ==
=== Detailed results (day 10) ===
Bobsleigh

- The final two runs of the two-man. The gold medal was shared by Justin Kripps and Alexander Kopacz of Canada and Francesco Friedrich and Thorsten Margis of Germany with an identical time of 3:16.86. Bronze went to Oskars Melbārdis and Jānis Strenga of Latvia with a time of 3:16.91.

Curling

- The sixth day of matches in the round robin stage of the men's tournament.
- The sixth day of matches in the round robin stage of the women's tournament.

Figure skating

- The ice dancing short program took place, with the Canadian pair of Tessa Virtue and Scott Moir leading at this stage with a score of 83.67.

Freestyle skiing

- The qualifying rounds of the women's halfpipe took place. Canadian Cassie Sharpe qualified with the best score of 93.40.

Ice hockey

- The women's tournament semi-finals:
  - United States 5–0 Finland
  - Canada 5–0 Olympic Athletes from Russia

Ski jumping

- The men's large hill team was won by the Norwegian team with a score of 1098.5. Silver went to the German team with a score of 1075.7, while bronze went to the Polish team with a score of 1072.4.

Snowboarding

- The qualification round of the women's big air took place, with Austrian Anna Gasser qualifying with the best score of 98.00.

Speed skating

- The qualification heats of the women's team pursuit took place. The Netherlands qualified with the fastest time, setting a new Olympic record of 2:55.61.
- The men's 500 m was won by Håvard Holmefjord Lorentzen of Norway in an Olympic record time of 34.41, ahead of South Korea's Cha Min-kyu with a time of 34.42 and China's Gao Tingyu with a time of 34.65.

=== Summary table (day 10) ===
Sport	Event	Gold medalist(s)			Silver medalist(s)		Bronze medalist(s)		Ref
Sport	Event	Competitor(s)	NOC	Rec	Competitor(s)	NOC	Competitor(s)	NOC	Ref
Bobsleigh	Two-man	Justin Kripps; Alexander Kopacz	Canada		Not awarded due to a tie for gold		Oskars Melbārdis; Jānis Strenga	Latvia	
Bobsleigh	Two-man	Francesco Friedrich; Thorsten Margis	Germany		Not awarded due to a tie for gold		Oskars Melbārdis; Jānis Strenga	Latvia	
Ski jumping	Men's large hill team	Daniel-André Tande; Andreas Stjernen; Johann André Forfang; Robert Johansson	Norway		Karl Geiger; Stephan Leyhe; Richard Freitag; Andreas Wellinger	Germany	Maciej Kot; Stefan Hula; Dawid Kubacki; Kamil Stoch	Poland	
Speed skating	Men's 500 m	Håvard Holmefjord Lorentzen	Norway	OR	Cha Min-kyu	South Korea	Gao Tingyu	China	

== Day 11 — Tuesday 20 February ==
=== Detailed results (day 11) ===
Biathlon

- The mixed relay was won by the French team in a time of 1:08:34.3, ahead of the Norwegian team with a time of 1:08:55.2 and the Italian team with a time of 1:09:01.2.

Bobsleigh

- The first two runs of the two-woman.

Curling

- The seventh day of matches in the round robin stage of the men's tournament.
- The seventh day of matches in the round robin stage of the women's tournament.

Figure skating

- The ice dancing free program was held. The competition was won by Tessa Virtue and Scott Moir of Canada, who set a world record total score of 206.07. Gabriella Papadakis and Guillaume Cizeron of France won silver with 205.28. Maia Shibutani and Alex Shibutani of the United States were third with 192.59.

Freestyle skiing

- In the final of the women's halfpipe, Canada's Cassie Sharpe won the gold with a score of 95.80, France's Marie Martinod scored a 92.60 to win the silver, and Brita Sigourney of the United States finished third with 91.60.
- The qualifying rounds of the men's halfpipe were held. Aaron Blunck (United States) qualified with the best score of 94.40.

Ice hockey

- The women's tournament:
  - Seventh place game: Sweden 6–1 Korea
  - Fifth place game: Switzerland 1–0 Japan
- The men's tournament qualification playoffs:
  - United States 5–1 Slovakia
  - Slovenia 1–2 OT Norway
  - Finland 5–2 South Korea
  - Switzerland 1–2 OT Germany

Nordic combined

- In the individual large hill/10 km, Germany achieved a podium sweep, with gold going to Johannes Rydzek with a time of 23:52.5, silver going to Fabian Rießle with a time of 23:52.9, and bronze going to Eric Frenzel with a time of 23:53.3.

Short track speed skating

- The final heats of the women's 3000 m relay were won by the South Korean team in a time of 4:07.361, ahead of the Italian team (4:15.901). After the Chinese and Canadian teams were disqualified in the A final, the bronze medal was awarded to the Dutch team, who finished the B final (originally to determine fifth place) in a world record time of 4:03.471.
- The qualifying heats of the women's 1000 m took place. The fastest time in any heat, 1:29.519, was recorded by Dutch skater Suzanne Schulting.
- The qualifying heats of the men's 500 m took place. Dajing Wu (China) set a new Olympic record time of 40.264.

=== Summary table (day 11) ===
Sport	Event	Gold medalist(s)			Silver medalist(s)		Bronze medalist(s)			Ref
Sport	Event	Competitor(s)	NOC	Rec	Competitor(s)	NOC	Competitor(s)	NOC	Rec	Ref
Biathlon	Mixed relay	Marie Dorin Habert; Anaïs Bescond; Simon Desthieux; Martin Fourcade	France		Marte Olsbu; Tiril Eckhoff; Johannes Thingnes Bø; Emil Hegle Svendsen	Norway	Lisa Vittozzi; Dorothea Wierer; Lukas Hofer; Dominik Windisch	Italy		
Figure skating	Ice dancing	Tessa Virtue; Scott Moir	Canada	WR	Gabriella Papadakis; Guillaume Cizeron	France	Maia Shibutani; Alex Shibutani	United States		
Freestyle skiing	Women's halfpipe	Cassie Sharpe	Canada		Marie Martinod	France	Brita Sigourney	United States		
Nordic combined	Individual large hill/10 km	Johannes Rydzek	Germany		Fabian Rießle	Germany	Eric Frenzel	Germany		
Short track speed skating	Women's 3000 m relay	Shim Suk-hee; Choi Min-jeong; Kim Ye-jin; Kim A-lang	South Korea		Arianna Fontana; Lucia Peretti; Cecilia Maffei; Martina Valcepina	Italy	Suzanne Schulting; Yara van Kerkhof; Lara van Ruijven; Jorien ter Mors	Netherlands	WR (Note: The Netherlands made the world record in the B Final (classification round) of the women's 3000 metre relay in short track speed skating originally to determine fifth place, and was then awarded bronze as a result of both China and Canada's disqualification in the A Final (medal round).)	

== Day 12 — Wednesday 21 February ==
=== Detailed results (day 12) ===
Alpine skiing

- The women's downhill was won by Italy's Sofia Goggia in a time of 1:39.22, followed by Norway's Ragnhild Mowinckel with a time of 1:39.31, and Lindsey Vonn of the United States with a time of 1:39.69.

Bobsleigh

- The final two runs of the two-woman were won by Mariama Jamanka and Lisa Buckwitz of Germany in a time of 3:22.45. Silver went to Elana Meyers Taylor and Lauren Gibbs of the United States with a time of 3:22.52, while bronze went to Canada's Kaillie Humphries and Phylicia George with a time of 3:22.89.

Cross-country skiing

- The men's team sprint was won by the Norwegian team in a time of 15:56.26, ahead of the team composed of Olympic Athletes from Russia with a time of 15:57.97 and the French team with a time of 15:58.28.
- The women's team sprint was won by the United States team in a time of 15:56.47, ahead of the Swedish team with a time of 15:56.66 and the Norwegian team with a time of 15:59.44.

Curling

- The eighth day of matches in the round robin stage of the men's tournament.
- The eighth day of matches in the round robin stage of the women's tournament.

Figure skating

- The ladies' singles short program took place, with Alina Zagitova (an Olympic Athlete from Russia) recording the best score of 82.92.

Freestyle skiing

- The men's ski cross was won by Brady Leman of Canada, followed by Switzerland's Marc Bischofberger and the Olympic Athlete from Russia Sergey Ridzik.

Ice hockey

- The women's tournament bronze medal game:
  - Finland 3–2 Olympic Athletes from Russia
- The men's tournament quarter-finals:
  - Czech Republic 3–2 GWS United States
  - Olympic Athletes from Russia 6–1 Norway
  - Canada 1–0 Finland
  - Sweden 3–4 OT Germany

Snowboarding

- The qualification round of the men's big air took place. Carlos Garcia Knight (New Zealand) qualified with the best score of 97.50.

Speed skating

- The final heats of the men's team pursuit was won by the Norwegian team in a time of 3:37.32, ahead of the South Korean team with a time of 3:38.52. Bronze went to the Netherlands, who won the bronze race in a time of 3:38.40, ahead of New Zealand's 3:43.54.
- The final heats of the women's team pursuit was won by the Japanese team in an Olympic record time of 2:53.89, ahead of the Dutch team with a time of 2:55.48. Bronze went to the United States, who won the bronze race in a time of 2:59.27, ahead of Canada's 2:59.72.

=== Summary table (day 12) ===
Sport	Event	Gold medalist(s)			Silver medalist(s)		Bronze medalist(s)		Ref
Sport	Event	Competitor(s)	NOC	Rec	Competitor(s)	NOC	Competitor(s)	NOC	Ref
Alpine skiing	Women's downhill	Sofia Goggia	Italy		Ragnhild Mowinckel	Norway	Lindsey Vonn	United States	
Bobsleigh	Two-woman	Mariama Jamanka; Lisa Buckwitz	Germany		Elana Meyers Taylor; Lauren Gibbs	United States	Kaillie Humphries; Phylicia George	Canada	
Cross-country skiing	Men's team sprint	Martin Johnsrud Sundby; Johannes Høsflot Klæbo	Norway		Denis Spitsov; Aleksandr Bolshunov	Olympic Athletes from Russia	Maurice Manificat; Richard Jouve	France	
Cross-country skiing	Women's team sprint	Kikkan Randall; Jessie Diggins	United States		Charlotte Kalla; Stina Nilsson	Sweden	Marit Bjørgen; Maiken Caspersen Falla	Norway	
Freestyle skiing	Men's ski cross	Brady Leman	Canada		Marc Bischofberger	Switzerland	Sergey Ridzik	Olympic Athletes from Russia	
Speed skating	Men's team pursuit	Håvard Bøkko; Simen Spieler Nilsen; Sverre Lunde Pedersen	Norway		Lee Seung-hoon; Chung Jae-won; Kim Min-seok	South Korea	Patrick Roest; Jan Blokhuijsen; Sven Kramer	Netherlands	
Speed skating	Women's team pursuit	Miho Takagi; Ayano Sato; Nana Takagi	Japan	OR	Marrit Leenstra; Ireen Wüst; Antoinette de Jong	Netherlands	Heather Bergsma; Brittany Bowe; Mia Manganello	United States	

== Day 13 — Thursday 22 February ==
=== Detailed results (day 13) ===
Alpine skiing

- The men's slalom was won by Sweden's André Myhrer with a total time of 1:38.99. Switzerland's Ramon Zenhäusern won the silver with a total time of 1:39.33, and Austria's Michael Matt was third with a total time of 1:39.66.
- Because of expected high winds on Friday 23 February, the women's combined was moved to this day. Michelle Gisin of Switzerland won the gold with a time of 2:20.90, Mikaela Shiffrin of the United States won silver with a time of 2:21.87, and Wendy Holdener of Switzerland was third with 2:22.34.

Biathlon

- The women's relay was won by Belarus with a time of 1:12:03.4. Sweden finished in second with 1:12:14.1 and France was third with 1:12:21.0.

Curling

- It was announced that as a result of Russian curlier Alexander Krushelnitskiy failing a doping test for meldonium, he and his partner Anastasia Bryzgalova were stripped of their bronze medals for the mixed doubles tournament. The medals were then awarded to Kristin Skaslien and Magnus Nedregotten of Norway, who had lost to the Russian team in the bronze medal game.
- The men's tournament:
  - Tie-breaker match: Great Britain 5–9 Switzerland
  - Semi-finals:
    - Sweden 9–3 Switzerland
    - Canada 3–5 United States

Freestyle skiing

- In the final of the men's halfpipe, David Wise of the United States won the gold with a score of 97.20, Alex Ferreira of the United States was second with 96.40, and Nico Porteous of New Zealand had a 94.80 to finish with the bronze.

Ice hockey

- The women's tournament gold medal game:
  - Canada 2–3 GWS United States

Nordic combined

- The team large hill/4 × 5 km was won by the German team in a time of 46:09.8, ahead of the Norwegian team with a time of 47:02.5 and the Austrian team with a time of 47:17.6.

Short track speed skating

- In the final of the women's 1000 m, Suzanne Schulting of the Netherlands won gold with a time of 1:29.778, Canada's Kim Boutin finished at 1:29.956 to win silver, and Italy's Arianna Fontana finished third at 1:30.656.
- China's Wu Dajing set a world record in the final of the men's 500 m with a time of 39.584. Korea's Hwang Dae-heon and Lim Hyo-jun finished second and third with times of 39.854 and 39.919, respectively.
- In the final of the men's 5000 m relay, the Hungarian team set an Olympic record time of 6:31.971 to win the gold. China finished second (6:32.035) and Canada finished third (6:32.282).

Snowboarding

- The qualification round of the men's parallel giant slalom was originally scheduled for this day, but was postponed to Saturday 24 February due to high winds.
- The qualification round of the women's parallel giant slalom was originally scheduled for this day, but was postponed to Saturday 24 February due to high winds.
- Because of expected high winds on Friday 23 February, the final round of the women's big air was moved to this day. Anna Gasser of Austria won the gold with a score of 185.00, Jamie Anderson of the United States won the silver with 177.25, and Zoi Sadowski-Synnott of New Zealand was third with 157.50.

=== Summary table (day 13) ===
Sport	Event	Gold medalist(s)			Silver medalist(s)		Bronze medalist(s)		Ref
Sport	Event	Competitor(s)	NOC	Rec	Competitor(s)	NOC	Competitor(s)	NOC	Ref
Alpine skiing	Men's slalom	André Myhrer	Sweden		Ramon Zenhäusern	Switzerland	Michael Matt	Austria	
Alpine skiing	Women's combined	Michelle Gisin	Switzerland		Mikaela Shiffrin	United States	Wendy Holdener	Switzerland	
Biathlon	Women's relay	Nadezhda Skardino; Iryna Kryuko; Dzinara Alimbekava; Darya Domracheva	Belarus		Linn Persson; Mona Brorsson; Anna Magnusson; Hanna Öberg	Sweden	Anaïs Chevalier; Marie Dorin Habert; Justine Braisaz; Anaïs Bescond	France	
Freestyle skiing	Men's halfpipe	David Wise	United States		Alex Ferreira	United States	Nico Porteous	New Zealand	
Ice hockey	Women's tournament	United States women's team	United States		Canada women's team	Canada	Finland women's team	Finland (Note: Bronze medalist(s) determined on the previous day.)	
Nordic combined	Team large hill/4 × 5 km	Vinzenz Geiger; Fabian Rießle; Eric Frenzel; Johannes Rydzek	Germany		Jan Schmid; Espen Andersen; Jarl Magnus Riiber; Jørgen Graabak	Norway	Wilhelm Denifl; Lukas Klapfer; Bernhard Gruber; Mario Seidl	Austria	
Short track speed skating	Women's 1000 m	Suzanne Schulting	Netherlands		Kim Boutin	Canada	Arianna Fontana	Italy	
Short track speed skating	Men's 500 m	Wu Dajing	China	WR	Hwang Dae-heon	South Korea	Lim Hyo-jun	South Korea	
Short track speed skating	Men's 5000 m relay	Shaoang Liu; Shaolin Sándor Liu; Viktor Knoch; Csaba Burján	Hungary	OR	Wu Dajing; Han Tianyu; Ren Ziwei; Xu Hongzhi	China	Samuel Girard; Charles Hamelin; Charle Cournoyer; Pascal Dion	Canada	
Snowboarding	Women's big air	Anna Gasser	Austria		Jamie Anderson	United States	Zoi Sadowski-Synnott	New Zealand	

== Day 14 — Friday 23 February ==
=== Detailed results (day 14) ===
Alpine skiing

- The women's combined was originally scheduled to take place, but was moved back to Thursday 22 February due to high winds being expected.

Biathlon

- The men's relay was won by the Swedish team in a time of 1:15:16.5, ahead of the Norwegian team with a time of 1:16:12.0 and the German team with a time of 1:17:23.6.

Curling

- The men's tournament bronze medal game.
  - Canada 5–7 Switzerland
- The women's tournament semi-finals.
  - South Korea 8–7 Japan
  - Sweden 10–5 Great Britain

Figure skating

- The ladies' singles free program was held. The competition was won by Russian Alina Zagitova with a total score of 239.57, Russian Evgenia Medvedeva won silver with 238.26, and Canadian Kaetlyn Osmond was third with 231.02.

Freestyle skiing

- The qualification round of the women's ski cross was originally scheduled for this day, but was moved back to Thursday 22 February due to high winds.
- The women's ski cross was won by Kelsey Serwa of Canada, followed by Canada's Brittany Phelan and Switzerland's Fanny Smith.

Ice hockey

- The men's tournament semi-finals:
  - Czech Republic 0–3 Olympic Athletes from Russia
  - Canada 3–4 Germany

Snowboarding

- The final round of the women's big air was originally scheduled to take place, but was moved back to Thursday 22 February due to high winds being expected.

Speed skating

- The men's 1000 m was won by Kjeld Nuis of the Netherlands in a time of 1:07.95. Silver went to Norway's Håvard Holmefjord Lorentzen with a time of 1:07.99, while bronze went to South Korea's Kim Tae-yun with a time of 1:08.22.

=== Summary table (day 14) ===
Sport	Event	Gold medalist(s)			Silver medalist(s)		Bronze medalist(s)		Ref
Sport	Event	Competitor(s)	NOC	Rec	Competitor(s)	NOC	Competitor(s)	NOC	Ref
Alpine skiing	Women's combined	Event moved to 22 February							
Biathlon	Men's relay	Peppe Femling; Jesper Nelin; Sebastian Samuelsson; Fredrik Lindström	Sweden		Lars Helge Birkeland; Tarjei Bø; Johannes Thingnes Bø; Emil Hegle Svendsen	Norway	Erik Lesser; Benedikt Doll; Arnd Peiffer; Simon Schempp	Germany	
Figure skating	Ladies' singles	Alina Zagitova	Olympic Athletes from Russia		Evgenia Medvedeva	Olympic Athletes from Russia	Kaetlyn Osmond	Canada	
Freestyle skiing	Women's ski cross	Kelsey Serwa	Canada		Brittany Phelan	Canada	Fanny Smith	Switzerland	
Snowboarding	Women's big air	Event moved to 22 February							
Speed skating	Men's 1000 m	Kjeld Nuis	Netherlands		Håvard Holmefjord Lorentzen	Norway	Kim Tae-yun	South Korea	

== Day 15 — Saturday 24 February ==
=== Detailed results (day 15) ===
Alpine skiing

- In the mixed team, the Swiss team defeated Austria, 3–1, in the gold medal final. The bronze medal final between Norway and France ended in a 2–2 tie, with Norway being awarded the bronze based on total time (41.17 to 41.29).

Bobsleigh

- The first two runs of the four-man.

Cross-country skiing

- The men's 50 km classical was won by Finland's Iivo Niskanen in a time of 2:08:22.1, ahead of Aleksandr Bolshunov and Andrey Larkov of the Olympic Athletes from Russia with times of 2:08:40.8 and 2:10:59.6, respectively.

Curling

- The men's tournament gold medal game.
  - Sweden 7–10 United States
- The women's tournament bronze medal game.
  - Great Britain 3–5 Japan

Ice hockey

- The men's tournament bronze medal game.
  - Czech Republic 4–6 Canada

Snowboarding

- In the final round of the men's big air, Canada's Sebastien Toutant won gold with a total score of 174.25. Kyle Mack of the United States was second with 168.75 and Great Britain's Billy Morgan won bronze with 168.00.
- The men's parallel giant slalom: The qualification rounds, originally scheduled for Thursday 22 February, was moved to this day to precede the final rounds of this event. In the gold medal race, Nevin Galmarini of Switzerland beat Lee Sang-ho of South Korea by 0.43 seconds. In the bronze medal race, Slovenia's Žan Košir beat France's Sylvain Dufour by 1.49 seconds.
- The women's parallel giant slalom: The qualification round, originally scheduled for Thursday 22 February, was moved to this day to precede the final rounds of this event. Ester Ledecká of the Czech Republic beat Selina Jörg of Germany in the gold medal race by 0.46 seconds. In the bronze medal race, Germany's Ramona Theresia Hofmeister beat Russia's Alena Zavarzina by 4.07 seconds.
  - Ledecká, who also won gold in the Alpine skiing women's super-G, became the first woman to win gold in two different sports during the same Winter Olympics.

Speed skating

- The men's mass start was won by Lee Seung-hoon of South Korea with 60 points, ahead of Belgium's Bart Swings with 40 points and Koen Verweij of the Netherlands with 20 points.
- The women's mass start was won by Japan's Nana Takagi with 60 points, ahead of South Korea's Kim Bo-reum with 40 points and Irene Schouten of the Netherlands with 20 points.

=== Summary table (day 15) ===
Sport	Event	Gold medalist(s)			Silver medalist(s)		Bronze medalist(s)		Ref
Sport	Event	Competitor(s)	NOC	Rec	Competitor(s)	NOC	Competitor(s)	NOC	Ref
Alpine skiing	Mixed team	Luca Aerni; Denise Feierabend; Wendy Holdener; Daniel Yule; Ramon Zenhäusern	Switzerland		Stephanie Brunner; Manuel Feller; Katharina Gallhuber; Katharina Liensberger; Michael Matt; Marco Schwarz	Austria	Sebastian Foss-Solevåg; Nina Haver-Løseth; Kristin Lysdahl; Leif Kristian Nestvold-Haugen; Jonathan Nordbotten; Maren Skjøld	Norway	
Cross-country skiing	Men's 50 km classical	Iivo Niskanen	Finland		Aleksandr Bolshunov	Olympic Athletes from Russia	Andrey Larkov	Olympic Athletes from Russia	
Curling	Men's tournament	John Shuster; Tyler George; Matt Hamilton; John Landsteiner; Joe Polo	United States		Niklas Edin; Oskar Eriksson; Rasmus Wranå; Christoffer Sundgren; Henrik Leek	Sweden	Benoît Schwarz; Claudio Pätz; Peter de Cruz; Valentin Tanner; Dominik Märki	Switzerland	
Snowboarding	Men's big air	Sebastien Toutant	Canada		Kyle Mack	United States	Billy Morgan	Great Britain	
Snowboarding	Men's parallel giant slalom	Nevin Galmarini	Switzerland		Lee Sang-ho	South Korea	Žan Košir	Slovenia	
Snowboarding	Women's parallel giant slalom	Ester Ledecká	Czech Republic		Selina Jörg	Germany	Ramona Theresia Hofmeister	Germany	
Speed skating	Men's mass start	Lee Seung-hoon	South Korea		Bart Swings	Belgium	Koen Verweij	Netherlands	
Speed skating	Women's mass start	Nana Takagi	Japan		Kim Bo-reum	South Korea	Irene Schouten	Netherlands	

== Day 16 — Sunday 25 February ==
=== Detailed results (day 16) ===
Bobsleigh

- The final two runs of the four-man were held. The competition was won by the German team of Francesco Friedrich, Candy Bauer, Martin Grothkopp, and Thorsten Margis with a total time of 3:15.85. The silver was shared by another German team (Nico Walther, Kevin Kuske, Alexander Rödiger, and Eric Franke) and a South Korean team (Won Yun-jong, Jun Jung-lin, Seo Young-woo, and Kim Dong-hyun) with identical total time of 3:16.38.

Cross-country skiing

- Norway's Marit Bjørgen won the women's 30 km classical with a time of 1:22:17.6. Finland's Krista Pärmäkoski finished second at 1:24:07.1 and Sweden's Stina Nilsson finished third at 1:24:16.5.

Curling

- The women's tournament gold medal game:
  - South Korea 3–8 Sweden

Figure skating

- The exhibition gala, featuring performances by the individual gold medalists and many others.

Ice hockey

- The men's tournament gold medal game.
  - Olympic Athletes from Russia 4–3 OT Germany

Closing ceremony

- The closing ceremony took place at Pyeongchang Olympic Stadium at 20:00 KST. It included the traditional handover to Beijing, the host city of the next Winter Olympics in 2022.

=== Summary table (day 16) ===
Sport	Event	Gold medalist(s)			Silver medalist(s)		Bronze medalist(s)		Ref
Sport	Event	Competitor(s)	NOC	Rec	Competitor(s)	NOC	Competitor(s)	NOC	Ref
Bobsleigh	Four-man	Francesco Friedrich; Candy Bauer; Martin Grothkopp; Thorsten Margis	Germany		Nico Walther; Kevin Kuske; Alexander Rödiger; Eric Franke	Germany	Not awarded due to a tie for silver		
Bobsleigh	Four-man	Francesco Friedrich; Candy Bauer; Martin Grothkopp; Thorsten Margis	Germany		Won Yun-jong; Jun Jung-lin; Seo Young-woo; Kim Dong-hyun	South Korea	Not awarded due to a tie for silver		
Cross-country skiing	Women's 30 km classical	Marit Bjørgen	Norway		Krista Pärmäkoski	Finland	Stina Nilsson	Sweden	
Curling	Women's tournament	Anna Hasselborg; Sara McManus; Agnes Knochenhauer; Sofia Mabergs; Jennie Wåhlin	Sweden		Kim Eun-jung; Kim Kyeong-ae; Kim Seon-yeong; Kim Yeong-mi; Kim Cho-hi	South Korea	Satsuki Fujisawa; Chinami Yoshida; Yumi Suzuki; Yurika Yoshida; Mari Motohashi	Japan	
Ice hockey	Men's tournament	OAR men's team	Olympic Athletes from Russia		Germany men's team	Germany	Canada men's team	Canada	
