= List of flag bearers for North Korea at the Olympics =

North Korea at the Olympics
- IOC code: PRK
- NOC: Olympic Committee of the Democratic People's Republic of Korea
- Medals: Gold 16 Silver 19 Bronze 28 Total 63

Summer appearances
- 1972; 1976; 1980; 1984–1988; 1992; 1996; 2000; 2004; 2008; 2012; 2016; 2020; 2024; 2028

Winter appearances
- 1964; 1968; 1972; 1976–1980; 1984; 1988; 1992; 1994; 1998; 2002; 2006; 2010; 2014; 2018; 2022–2026

Other related appearances
- Korea (2018)

This is a list of flag bearers who have represented North Korea at the Olympics.

Flag bearers carry the national flag of their country at the opening ceremony of the Olympic Games.

#	Event year	Season	Flag bearer	Sport
1	1972	Summer	Kim Man-dok	
2	1984	Winter	Im Ri-bin	
3	1988	Winter	Im Ri-bin	
4	1992	Summer	Kim Gil-nam	
5	1996	Summer	Chae Ra-u	
6	1998	Winter	Yun Chol	
7	2000	Summer	Pak Jung-chul	
8	2004	Summer	Kim Song-ho	
9	2006	Winter	Han Jong-in	
10	2008	Summer	Pang Mun-il	
11	2010	Winter	Ri Song-chol	
12	2012	Summer	Pak Song-Chol	Athletics
13	2016	Summer	Choe Jon-wi	Weightlifting
14	2018	Winter	Hwang Chung-gum (Note: South Korea didn't march at the Parade of Nations. Its delegates along with North Korea's marched in the opening ceremony as "Korea". South Korean bobsleigher Won Yun-jong along with North Korean ice hockey player Hwang Chung-gum were the flagbearers of the unified Korea team.)	Ice Hockey
15	2024	Summer	Mun Song-hui	Judo
15	2024	Summer	Im Yong-myong	Diving

== See also ==
- North Korea at the Olympics
