= North Korea at the 2018 Winter Olympics =

- Flag of North Korea
- IOC code: PRK
- NOC: Olympic Committee of the Democratic People's Republic of Korea

in Pyeongchang, South Korea 9–25 February 2018
- Competitors: 10 in 4 sports
- Flag bearer: None (Note: North Korea did not march as a separate country at the Parade of Nations. The North Korean delegates joined with those from South Korea to participate in the opening ceremony as "Korea". The flagbearers of the unified Korea team were North Korean ice hockey player Hwang Chung-gum and South Korean bobsleigher Won Yun-jong.)
- Medals: Gold 0 Silver 0 Bronze 0 Total 0

Winter Olympics appearances (overview)
- 1964; 1968; 1972; 1976–1980; 1984; 1988; 1992; 1994; 1998; 2002; 2006; 2010; 2014; 2018; 2022–2026

Other related appearances
- Korea (2018)

North Korea competed in the 2018 Winter Olympics in Pyeongchang, South Korea. Pair skaters Ryom Tae-ok and Kim Ju-sik qualified for the Games, but the North Korean National Olympic Committee failed to enter them by the 30 October 2017 deadline. On 9 January 2018, North Korea agreed in negotiations with South Korea to send both athletes and a delegation to the Winter Olympics.

PyeongChang 2018 marked the first time the North Korean Olympic team competed in South Korea as North Korea did not attend the 1988 Summer Olympics in Seoul due to the North Korean boycott.

The teams representing North Korea and South Korea entered the Opening Ceremony marching under the Korean Unification Flag, while in women's ice hockey there was a single united Korean team.

== Competitors ==
The following is the list of number of competitors participating in the North Korean delegation per sport.

Sport	Men	Women	Total
Alpine skiing	2	1	3
Cross-country skiing	2	1	3
Figure skating	1	1	2
Ice hockey	0	0^{[a]}	0
Short track speed skating	2	0	2
Total	7	3	10

^{a} Twelve members of the North Korea women's ice hockey team formed part of a unified Korea women's team which competed under a different country code (COR).

== Lead up to the Games ==
The International Olympic Committee (IOC) was keen for North Korean athletes to participate at the 2018 Winter Olympics. In order to increase their chances of qualification, the IOC offered to support them with equipment, accommodation, and travel to qualification events.

North Korean short track speed skaters and cross-country skiers did not qualify for the Games. A wild card arrangement was considered for the eventuality that no North Korean athlete managed to qualify.

The host nation South Korea had proposed a unified team of the two Koreas at the Games. The team would participate at least in the women's ice hockey event and possibly more disciplines. North Korea rejected this proposal in June 2017 on the grounds of time constraints.

Similarly, South Korea had suggested that North Korea could co-host some of the skiing events at the Masikryong Ski Resort. This suggestion came after Moon Jae-in was elected President of South Korea in 2017. Earlier in December 2014, the organizers had denied the possibility of sharing any part of their bid with the North. Like the unified team proposal, the new co-hosting proposal was refused by the North. North Korea, however, supported South Korea's Olympic bid for the 2018 Games. This was unlike in 1988, when North Korea was willing to co-host the 1988 Summer Olympics in Seoul, but once those plans had failed, it instead boycotted the Games and orchestrated the bombing of Korean Air Flight 858, in what is believed to have been an attempt to sabotage the Games.

=== Qualification ===
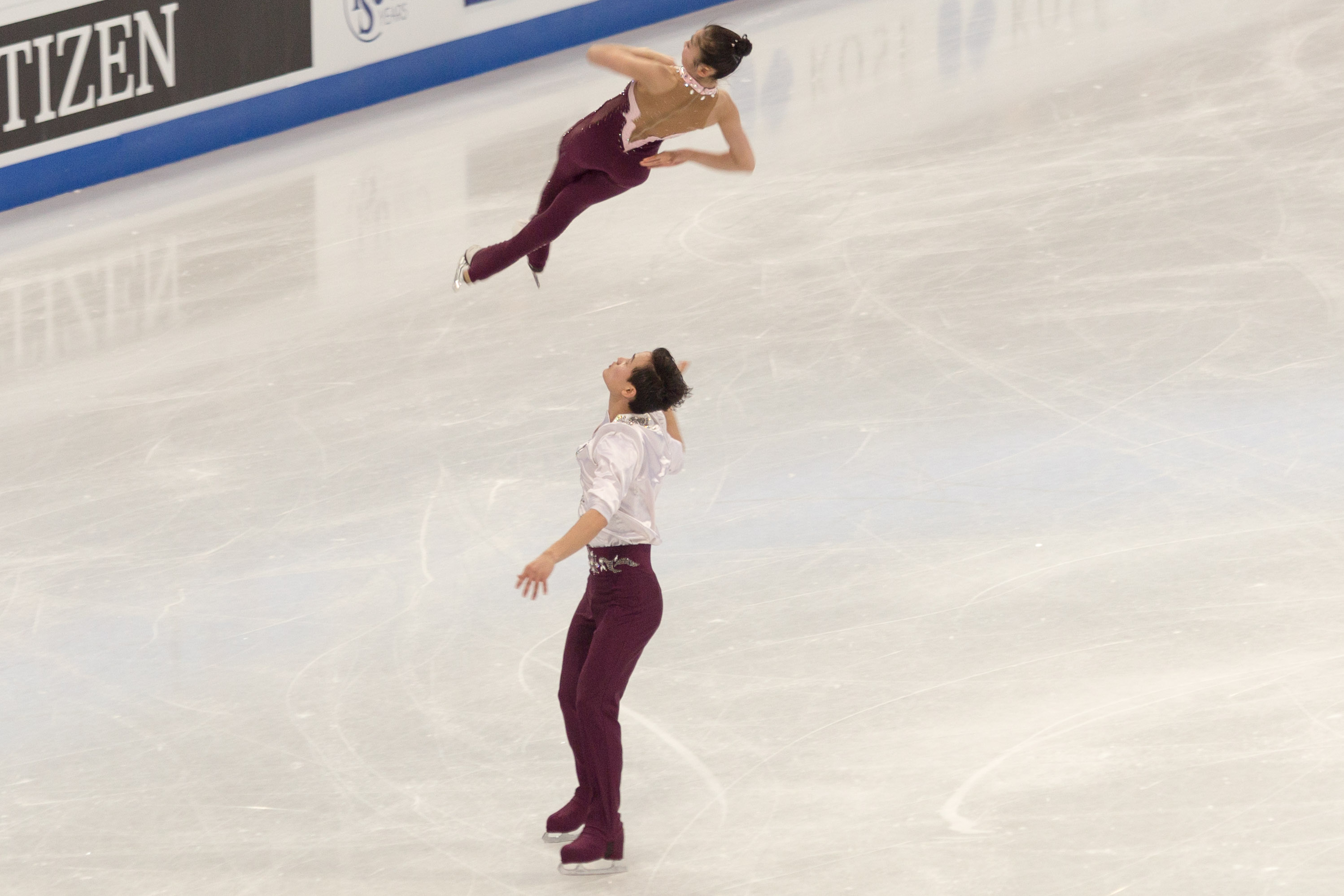
Ryom Tae-ok and Kim Ju-sik in 2017

Ryom Tae-ok and Kim Ju-sik qualified for the Games on 29 September 2017 at the 2017 CS Nebelhorn Trophy in Oberstdorf, Germany. Their successful free skating program was to the tune of "Je ne suis qu'une chanson" by Ginette Reno, and their short program on the day before was to the music of The Beatles. They took one of the five available qualification spots for pair skaters at the event, as had previously been anticipated.

The qualification was seen as a positive development, since it could alleviate fears of the escalation of the 2017–18 North Korea crisis that might have otherwise jeopardized the Games.

The International Skating Union confirmed Ryom and Kim's qualification, but the North Korean National Olympic Committee still needed to approve their participation. Chang Ung, a North Korean member of the IOC, said he found this likely, adding: "I am quite sure that politics is one thing and Olympics is another thing. So I don't see any big problem for the Pyeongchang Olympics." Despite this, the North Korean NOC failed to accept the two athletes by the deadline of 30 October.

=== Failure to enter athletes ===
When the North Korean NOC failed to enter its only qualified athletes to the Games, North Korea's participation remained uncertain. The North Korean spot went to the runners up, Sumire Suto and Francis Boudreau-Audet representing Japan. They needed to accept the spot by 21 December 2017, which did not happen. North Korea could still have requested its quota be confirmed, in which case the IOC would have deliberated on the matter. An IOC spokesperson stated, "[W]e would of course be flexible if they expressed a desire to come." A wild card option remained on the table.

Organizers of the Games did not expect the final decision on North Korea's participation to be made until the very last opportunity, and Moon Jae-in had given North Korea the chance to make the decision at any time before the start of the Games.

=== High-level talks ===
The impasse ended when North Korea's leader Kim Jong Un signaled in his New Year's speech for 2018, a possibility of sending athletes to the Games after all, saying "North Korea's participation in the Winter Games will be a good opportunity to showcase the national pride and we wish the Games will be a success. Officials from the two Koreas may urgently meet to discuss the possibility". The announcement was followed by South Korean agreement to participate in the first high-level talks with the North since December 2015; the talks were scheduled for 9 January 2018. North Korea was also prepared to talk to the IOC that week. In preparation for the North–South talks, the two countries restored the Seoul–Pyongyang hotline, which had been inactive for almost two years, and exchanged related documents via fax. After these developments, North Korea's IOC member Chang Ung said that the participation of North Korean figure skaters again looked likely. After the discussions on 9 January 2018, North Korea announced that they would send athletes to compete along with a delegation to attend the Winter Olympics.

These moves were met with public opposition in South Korea, including protests and online petitions; critics argued that the government was attempting to use the Olympics to spread pro-North Korean sentiment, and that the idea of a unified hockey team was ill-conceived. A rap video entitled "The Regret for Pyeongchang" (평창유감), echoing this criticism and labeling the event the "Pyongyang Olympics", went viral in the country. Japan's foreign affairs minister Tarō Kōno warned South Korea to be wary of North Korea's "charm offensive", and not to ease its pressure on the country.

== Diplomacy at the Games ==
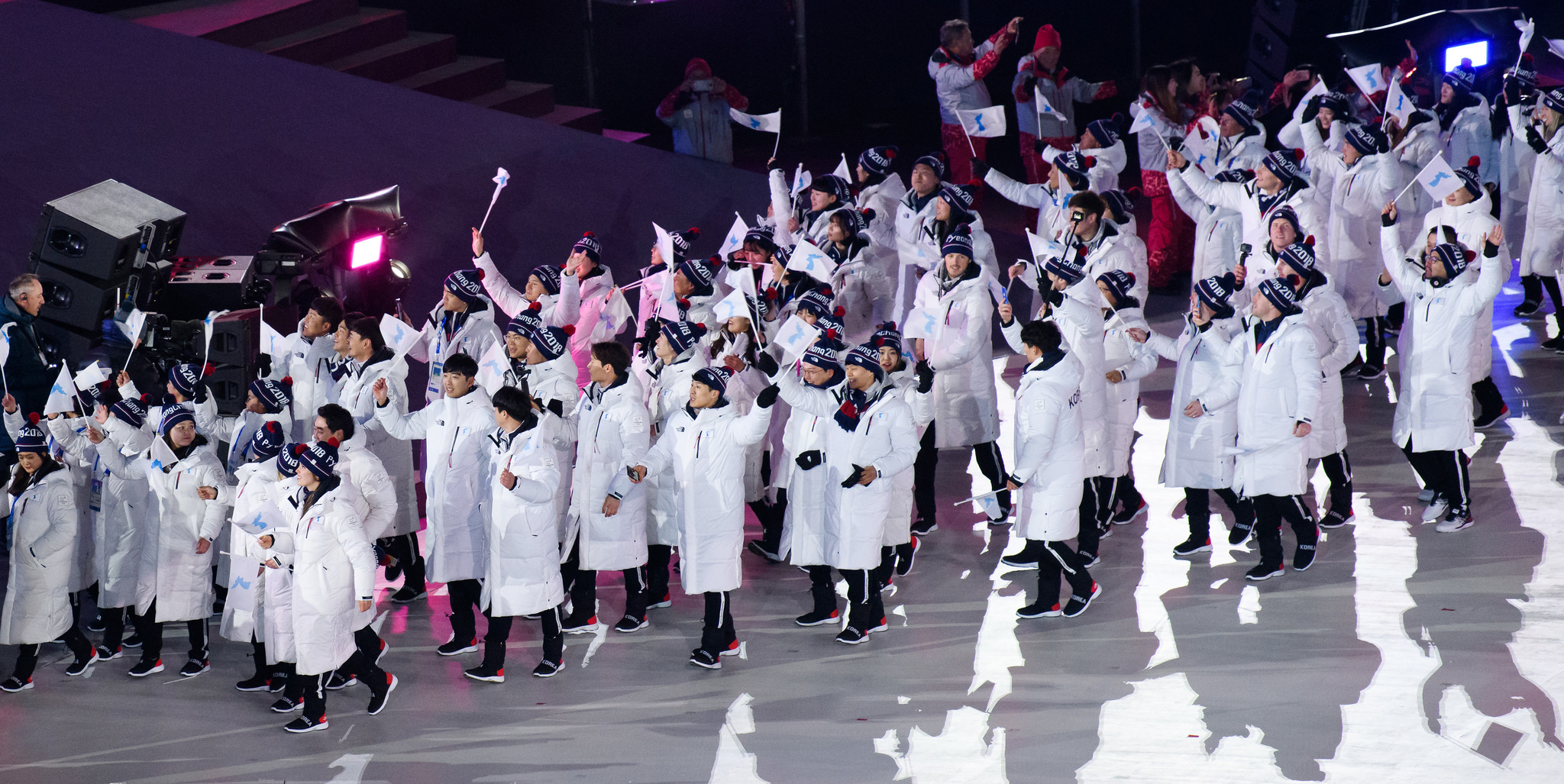
North Korean and South Korean athletes at the opening ceremony

The athletes from North and South Korea marched under the Korean unification flag in the opening ceremony. South Korean Won Yun-jong and North Korean Hwang Chung-gum both held the flagpole.

As well as the athletes, North Korea sent an unprecedented high-level delegation, headed by Kim Yo Jong (sister of the Supreme Leader Kim Jong Un) and President Kim Yong-nam, and including performers like the Samjiyon Orchestra. The delegation handed over an invitation to the South Korean President, Moon Jae-in, to visit North Korea.

President Moon shook hands with Kim Yo Jong at the start of the Olympics. This was the first time since the Korean War that a member of the ruling Kim dynasty had visited South Korea. In contrast, US Vice President Mike Pence met North Korean defectors in PyeongChang joined by Fred Warmbier, whose son Otto died the year before after being released from North Korean captivity. American officials said that North Korea canceled a meeting with Pence at the last minute.

The apparent softening of relations between the two countries was marred by North Korea dispatching general Kim Yong-chol to head the North Korean delegation present at the closing ceremony. The arrival of Kim, held responsible by South Korea for the deaths of dozens of South Korean navy personnel, was met with hostility but the government did not oppose his presence at the Olympics. The general ended up being seated in the same stand as Ivanka Trump, the daughter of the US president.

== Alpine skiing ==
Athlete	Event	Run 1		Run 2		Total		Ref
Athlete	Event	Time	Rank	Time	Rank	Time	Rank	Ref
Choe Myong-gwang	Men's giant slalom	1:38.67	85	1:33.34	75	3:12.01	75	
Choe Myong-gwang	Men's slalom	1:09.42	51	1:13.39	43	2:22.81	43	
Kang Song-il	Men's giant slalom	1:32.03	84	1:29.99	74	3:02.02	74	
Kang Song-il	Men's slalom	1:11.43	52	DNF				
Kim Ryon-hyang	Women's giant slalom	1:40.22	67	DSQ		DNF		
Kim Ryon-hyang	Women's slalom	1:18.17	59	1:19.81	54	2:37.98	54	

== Cross-country skiing ==
Distance

Athlete	Event	Final			Ref
Athlete	Event	Time	Deficit	Rank	Ref
Han Chun-gyong	Men's 15 km freestyle	42:29.2	+8:45.3	97	
Pak Il-chol	Men's 15 km freestyle	43:43.4	+9:59.5	103	
Ri Yong-gum	Women's 10 km freestyle	36:40.4	+11:39.9	89	

== Figure skating ==
Athlete	Event	SP		FS		Total		Ref
Athlete	Event	Points	Rank	Points	Rank	Points	Rank	Ref
Ryom Tae-ok; Kim Ju-sik	Pairs	69.4	11	124.23	12	193.63	13	

== Women's ice hockey tournament ==
In January 2018, it was announced that the North Korean team would be amalgamated with a group of South Korean players to form a single Korean team in the women's ice hockey tournament. In this unified team, at least three North Korean players were to be selected for each game. The South Korea women's national ice hockey team qualified as the host.

== Short track speed skating ==
Athlete	Event	Heat		Quarterfinal		Semifinal		Final		Ref
Athlete	Event	Time	Rank	Time	Rank	Time	Rank	Time	Rank	Ref
Jong Kwang-bom	Men's 500 m	PEN		did not advance						
Choe Un-song	Men's 1500 m	2:18.213	6	—N/a		did not advance				

== See also ==
- Concerns and controversies at the 2018 Winter Olympics
- Korean conflict
- North Korea at the 2017 Asian Winter Games
- North Korea–South Korea relations
- North Korea women's national ice hockey team
- Politics and sports
