= Suk Young-jin =

South Korean bobsledder (born 1990)

Suk Young-Jin
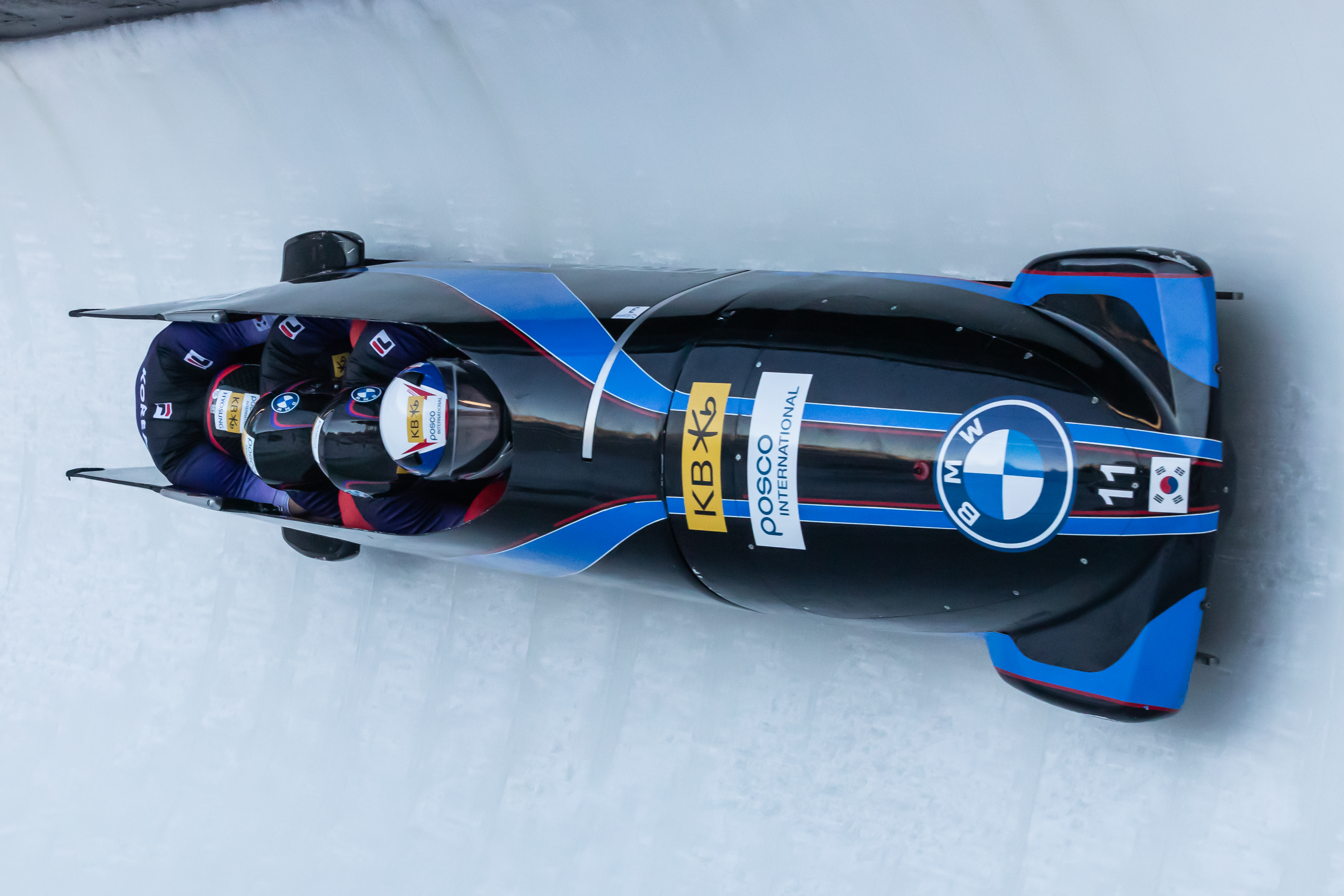
- IBSF World Championships, 2021

Personal information
- Nationality: South Korean
- Born: 30 August 1990 (age 36) Pohang, South Korea
- Height: 1.76 m (5 ft 9 in)
- Weight: 98 kg (216 lb)

Sport
- Country: South Korea
- Sport: Bobsleigh

Suk Young-Jin (Korean: 석영진; born August 30, 1990 in Pohang) is a South Korean bobsledder.

Suk competed at the 2014 Winter Olympics for South Korea. He teamed with driver Won Yun-Jong, Jun Jung-Lin and Seo Young-Woo in the South Korea-1 sled in the four-man event, finishing 20th.

Suk made his World Cup debut in February 2012. As of April 2014, his best World Cup finish is 17th, in 2012-13 at Whistler.
