= Ri Song-chol =

North Korean figure skater

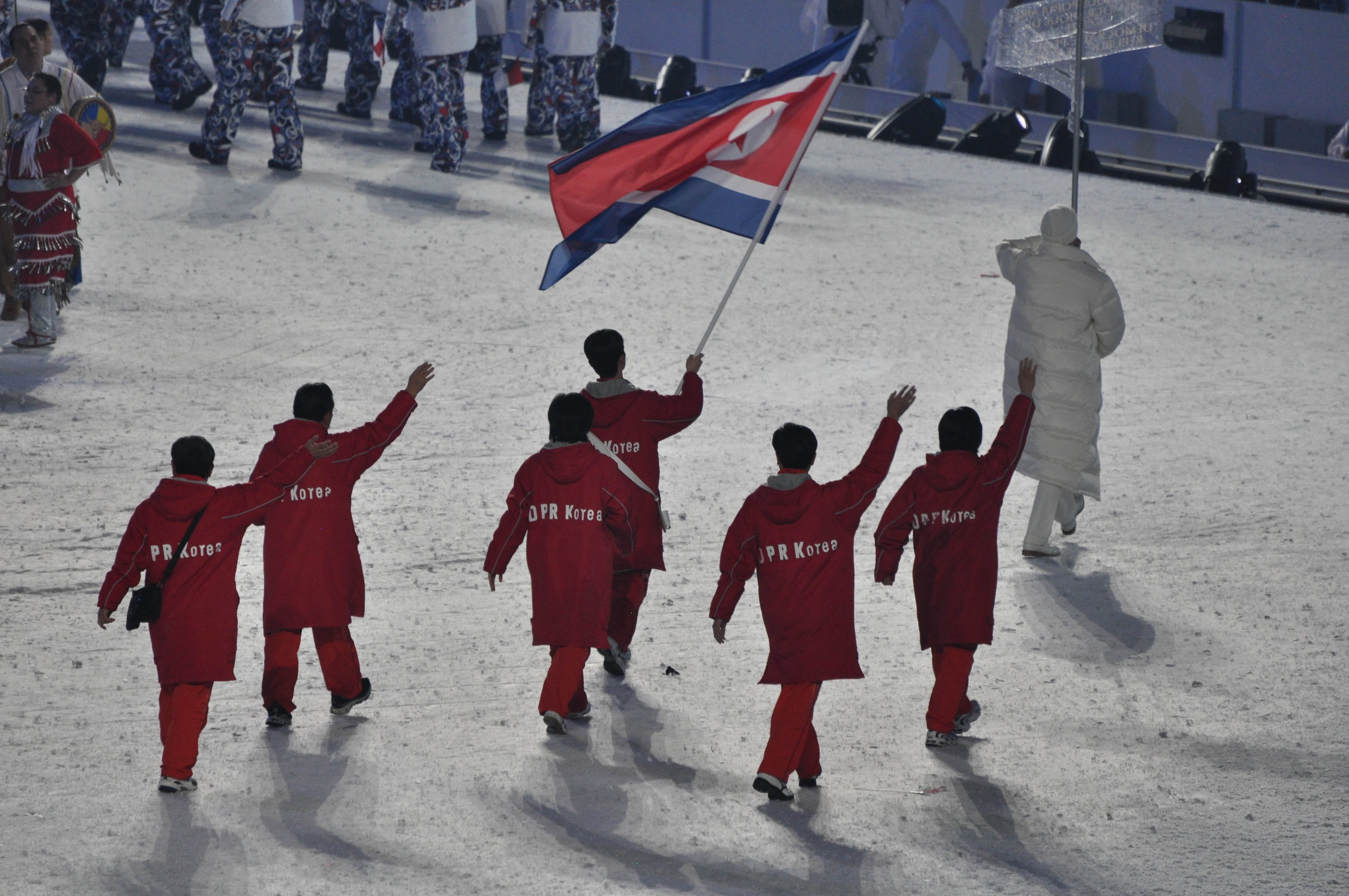
- Ri with the flag at the 2010 Winter Olympics opening ceremony

Personal information
- Born: April 5, 1986 (age 40) Pyongyang, North Korea
- Height: 1.68 m (5 ft 6 in)

Figure skating career
- Country: North Korea
- Coach: Jon Il-gyu; Paek Un-yong
- Skating club: Pyongchol Club
- Began skating: 1994
- Retired: 2011
Medal record
Representing North Korea
Figure skating: Men's singles
Asian Figure Skating Trophy
Gold medal – first place	2008 Asian Trophy	Hong Kong

- Ri Song-chol
- Hangul: 리성철
- RR: Ri Seongcheol
- MR: Ri Sŏngch'ŏl

Ri Song-chol (born April 5, 1986) is a North Korean former competitive figure skater and politician. He is the 2008 Asian Figure Skating Trophy champion and a five-time North Korean national champion (2003, 2007, 2008, 2009, and 2010). He competed at the 2010 Winter Olympics in Vancouver, British Columbia, Canada, where he was the flag bearer for North Korea at the opening ceremony.

Ri was elected to North Korea's Supreme People's Assembly in the 2009 North Korean parliamentary election, representing the 418th Electoral District. He did not renew his seat in the following elections.

== Programs ==
Season	Short program	Free skating
2009–2010	Whistle Wind by I. T. Kim	The Four Seasons by Antonio Vivaldi

== Competitive highlights ==
JGP: Junior Grand Prix

International
Event	00–01	02–03	03–04	04–05	05–06	06–07	07–08	08–09	09–10	10–11
Winter Olympics									25th	
Nebelhorn Trophy									11th	
Asian Games		9th				6th				8th
Asian Trophy								1st		
Ice Challenge										6th
International: Junior
JGP China				8th						
JGP Serbia		3rd								
Triglav Trophy			2nd J							
National
North Korea	4th	1st	2nd	2nd	2nd	1st	1st	1st	1st	

Olympic Games
Preceded by (North Korea) Han Jong-in	Flagbearer for North Korea; 2010 Vancouver	Succeeded by Hwang Chung-gum with Won Yun-jong for Korea
