= Sergio Rigoni =

Italian cross-country skier

Personal information
- Nationality: Italy
- Born: 27 April 1986 (age 40) Asiago, Italy

Sport
- Sport: Skiing
- Club: Fiamme Oro

World Cup career
- Seasons: 6 – (2009, 2012, 2014, 2016–2018)
- Indiv. starts: 18
- Indiv. podiums: 0
- Team starts: 1
- Team podiums: 0
- Overall titles: 0
- Discipline titles: 0

Sergio Rigoni (born 27 April 1986) is an Italian cross-country skier who competes internationally.

Rigoni is an athlete of the G.S. Fiamme Oro.

== Biography ==
He represented Italy at the 2018 Winter Olympics.

== Cross-country skiing results ==
All results are sourced from the International Ski Federation (FIS).

=== Olympic Games ===
Year	Age	15 km individual	30 km skiathlon	50 km mass start	Sprint	4 × 10 km relay	Team sprint
2018	31	72	48	—	—	—	—

=== World Championships ===
Year	Age	15 km individual	30 km skiathlon	50 km mass start	Sprint	4 × 10 km relay	Team sprint
2017	30	—	45	46	—	—	—

=== World Cup ===
==== Season standings ====
Season	Age	Discipline standings			Ski Tour standings			
Season	Age	Overall	Distance	Sprint	Nordic Opening	Tour de Ski	World Cup Final	Ski Tour Canada
2009	22	NC	NC	NC	—N/a	—	—	—N/a
2012	25	NC	—	NC	—	—	—	—N/a
2014	27	NC	NC	NC	—	—	—	—N/a
2016	29	NC	NC	NC	—	—	—N/a	—
2017	30	NC	NC	NC	—	—	—	—N/a
2018	31	NC	NC	—	—	—	—	—N/a
