= Matías Zuloaga =

Argentine cross-country skier

Personal information
- Born: 23 December 1997 (age 28) Ushuaia, Argentina

Sport
- Country: Argentina
- Sport: Cross-country skiing
- Club: Club Andino Ushuaia

Matías Zuloaga (Latin American Spanish: [maˈti.as suloˈaɣa]; born 23 December 1997) is an Argentine cross-country skier. He competed in the men's 15 kilometre freestyle at the 2018 Winter Olympics.

== Personal life ==
He is related to the Argentine biathletes María Giró who competed in the 1992 Winter Olympics and 1994 Winter Olympics, and Gustavo Giró who competed at the 1998 Winter Olympics.

== Sports career ==
He started skiing when he was 3 years old, influenced by his family. He also competed in biathlon and Mountain biking.

In 2017, he won the Argentine Championship in 10 km freestyle and every single competence organized by the International Ski Federation in Cerro Catedral and Cerro Castor. That same year, he competed in the Junior World Championship in the United States, finishing in the 60th place in skiathlon and 67th place in 10 km freestyle.

=== Pyeongchang 2018 ===
At the 2018 Winter Olympics, he competed for the first time in the cross-country 15 km freestyle event, after qualifying due to the score accumulation of Austria and Germany. He finished in the 100th place with a time of 42:27.5.

His coach, Sebastián Menci, participated in the 1992 Winter Olympics.
