= Seo Young-woo =

South Korean bobsledder

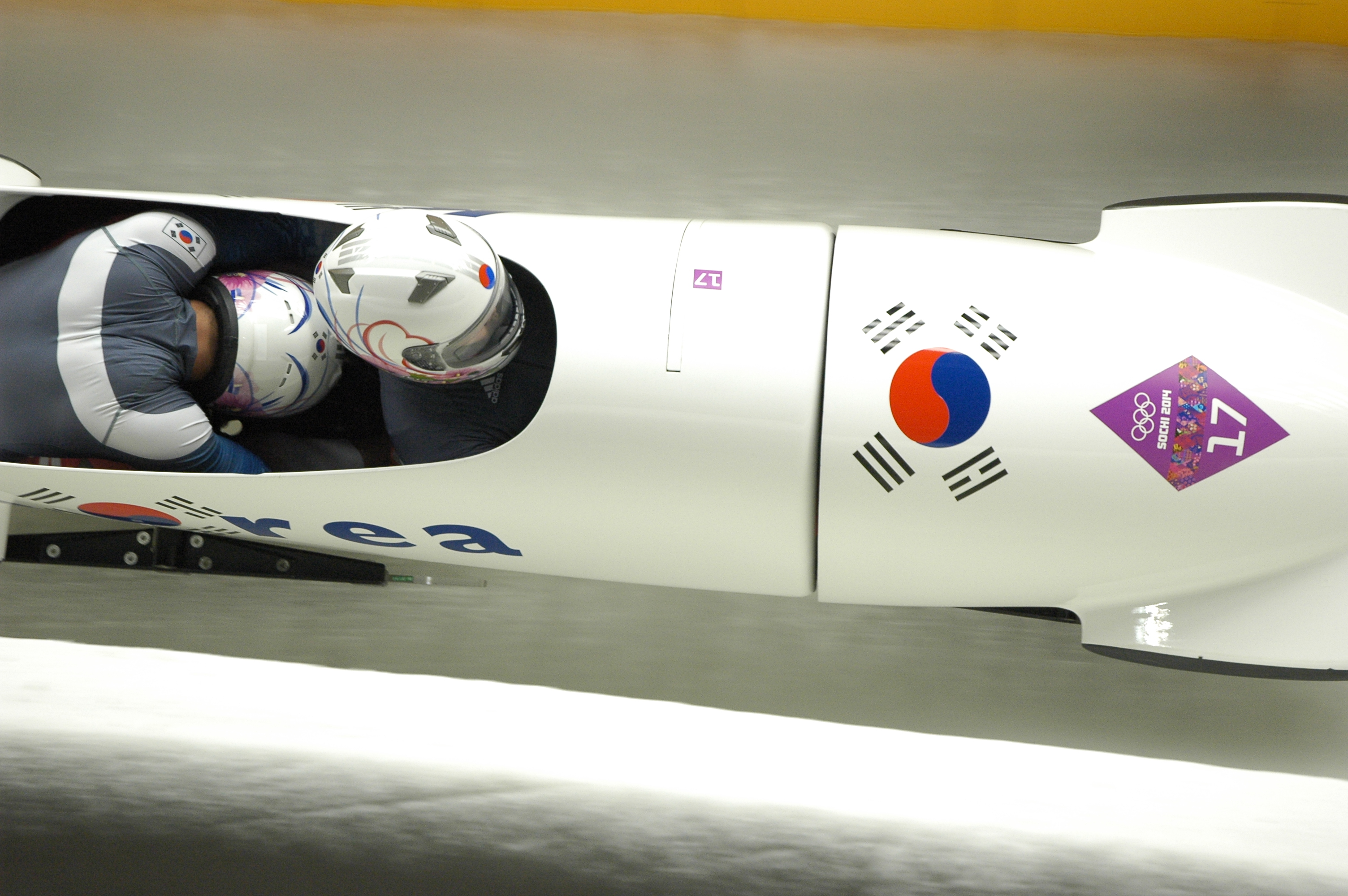
- Seo (brakeman) and Won (pilot) in 2-man event at 2014 Winter Olympics

Personal information
- Nationality: South Korean
- Born: 27 October 1991 (age 34) Seosan, South Korea
- Height: 1.80 m (5 ft 11 in)
- Weight: 97 kg (214 lb)

Sport
- Country: South Korea
- Sport: Bobsleigh
Medal record
Olympic Games
Silver medal – second place	2018 Pyeongchang	Four-man

Seo Young-woo (Korean: 서영우, born 27 October 1991) is a South Korean bobsledder who competes as the brakeman for the two-man bobsled piloted by Won Yun-jong as well as a push crewman for the four-man bobsled also piloted by Won Yun-jong.

== Career ==
Seo previously competed in track & field as a high school athlete. As a freshman at Sungkyul University, he was selected for the South Korean national bobsleigh team in early 2010 and made his first international appearance at the North American Cup in Park City in November 2010.

Seo competed at the 2014 Winter Olympics for South Korea. He teamed with pilot Won Yun-jong in the South Korea-1 sled in the two-man event, finishing 18th, and with Won, Jun Jung-lin and Suk Young-jin in the four-man, finishing 20th.

His best showing at the IBSF World Championships is fifth, in the two-man event in 2015.

Seo made his World Cup debut in December 2010, as a brakeman for mediocre driver Kang Kwang-bae. After a couple of rocky seasons with different pilots, Seo temporarily quit bobsleigh to focus on studying in college. Seo teamed up with promising pilot Won Yun-jong in 2013 when Seo returned to the national team, and his team outperformed expectations. Following a respectable 11th-place finish in 2014–15 World Cup season series, Seo & Won became the overall champion in the 2015–2016 World Cup season, clinching five medals including two gold medals at Whistler and Konigssee.

Their performances gradually deteriorated in the 2016–17 season when the duo began to use the domestic sled that was manufactured by the Hyundai Motor Company, South Korea's largest automaker. Seo and Won never stood on a podium in any race during the World Cup series and dipped to an IBSF ranking of 46th. Prior to the 2018 Winter Olympics, the duo eventually decided to use Larvia's BTC sled again that they became the World Cup overall champion with.

Seo along with pilot Won placed sixth out of 30 teams in the two-man event at the 2018 Winter Olympics in Pyeongchang on February 19, recording an overall time of 3:17.40 in four runs. Although they failed to win a medal, it was the best Olympic result by an Asian bobsleigh team. The following week, on February 25, the South Korean four-man team of Seo, Won, Kim Dong-hyun and Jun Jung-lin won a surprising silver medal in the four-man event, tying with a German team led by Nico Walther. With the silver medal, South Korea became the first Asian nation to claim an Olympic medal in a bobsleigh event.

== Filmography ==
=== Television show ===
Year	Title	Role	Notes	Ref.
2023	World's First Merchant	Contestant	Season 2	
