= Hwang Chung-gum =

North Korean ice hockey player (born 1995)

- Born: September 11, 1995 (age 30) North Korea
- Height: 163 cm (5 ft 4 in)
- Weight: 59 kg (130 lb; 9 st 4 lb)
- Position: Defence
- Shoots: Left
- team: Taesongsan Sports Club
- National team: North Korea and Korea
- Playing career: 2014–present

Korean name
- Hangul: 황충금
- RR: Hwang Chunggeum
- MR: Hwang Ch'unggŭm

Hwang Chung-gum (Korean: 황충금; born 11 September 1995) is an ice hockey player of North Korea representing the Taesongsan Sports Club.

== Career ==
Hwang began playing in 2005, in the Taesongsan Sports Club.

=== Pyeongchang 2018 ===
Hwang was one of the two flag bearers for the Unified Korea team at the 2018 Winter Olympics Parade of Nations with Won Yun-jong.

Hwang is one of 12 North Korean female ice hockey players chosen to be admitted to the Unified Korea team to accompany South Korean players. Rules set by the International Olympic Committee mandate that for each game, three players of the team must be North Korean. Hwang was picked for all three games against Switzerland, Sweden, and Japan by Sarah Murray, the team's coach.

Olympic Games
Preceded by (South Korea) Lee Kyou-hyuk (North Korea) Ri Song-chol	Flagbearer for Korea; 2018 Pyeongchang (with Won Yun-jong)	Succeeded by Incumbent
