= Concerns and controversies at the 2018 Winter Olympics =

A number of notable controversies and concerns associated with the 2018 Winter Olympics in PyeongChang, South Korea, emerged which were the subject of public debate and media commentary.

== Russian doping ==
=== Official sanctions ===
Approved OAR logo

On 5 December 2017, the IOC announced that the Russian Olympic Committee had been suspended effective immediately from the 2018 Winter Olympics. Athletes who had no previous drug violations and a consistent history of drug testing were to be allowed to compete under the Olympic Flag as an "Olympic Athlete from Russia" (OAR). Under the terms of the decree, Russian government officials were barred from the Games, and neither the country's flag nor anthem would be present. The Olympic Flag and Olympic Anthem will be used instead, and on 20 December 2017 the IOC proposed an alternate logo for the uniforms (seen at right). IOC President Thomas Bach said that "after following due process [the IOC] has issued proportional sanctions for this systematic manipulation while protecting the clean athletes."

As of January 2018, the IOC had sanctioned 43 Russian athletes from the 2014 Winter Olympics and banned them from competing in the 2018 edition and all other future Olympic Games as part of the Oswald Commission. All but one of these athletes appealed against their bans to the Court of Arbitration for Sport (CAS). The court overturned the sanctions on 28 athletes meaning that their Sochi medals and results are reinstated but decided that there was sufficient evidence against 11 athletes to uphold their Sochi sanctions. The IOC said in a statement that "the result of the CAS decision does not mean that athletes from the group of 28 will be invited to the Games. Not being sanctioned does not automatically confer the privilege of an invitation" and that "this [case] may have a serious impact on the future fight against doping". The IOC found it important to note that CAS Secretary General "insisted that the CAS decision does not mean that these 28 athletes are innocent" and that they would consider an appeal against the court's decision. The court also decided that none of the 39 athletes should be banned from all future Olympic Games, but only the 2018 Games. Three Russian athletes are still waiting for their hearing, which will be conducted after the 2018 Games. After the CAS decision was announced, the four-time Olympic champion in biathlon Alexander Tikhonov demanded to call to account the President of the IOC for "false accusations". Russia's sports minister Pavel Kolobkov wanted the IOC to ensure the participation of these Russian athletes at the Olympics in Pyeongchang.

An original pool of 500 Russian athletes was put forward for consideration for the games and 111 were immediately removed from consideration. The remaining athletes had to meet pre-games conditions such as further pre-games tests and reanalysis from stored samples. Only if these requirements are met, can the athletes be considered for invitation to the games. None of the athletes who had been sanctioned by the Oswald Commission were still in the pool. The final number of neutral Russian athletes invited to compete was 169.

On 22 February Alexander Krushelnitskiy of the Olympic Athletes from Russia team was stripped of his bronze medal in mixed doubles curling after testing positive for meldonium.

=== Reaction in Russia ===
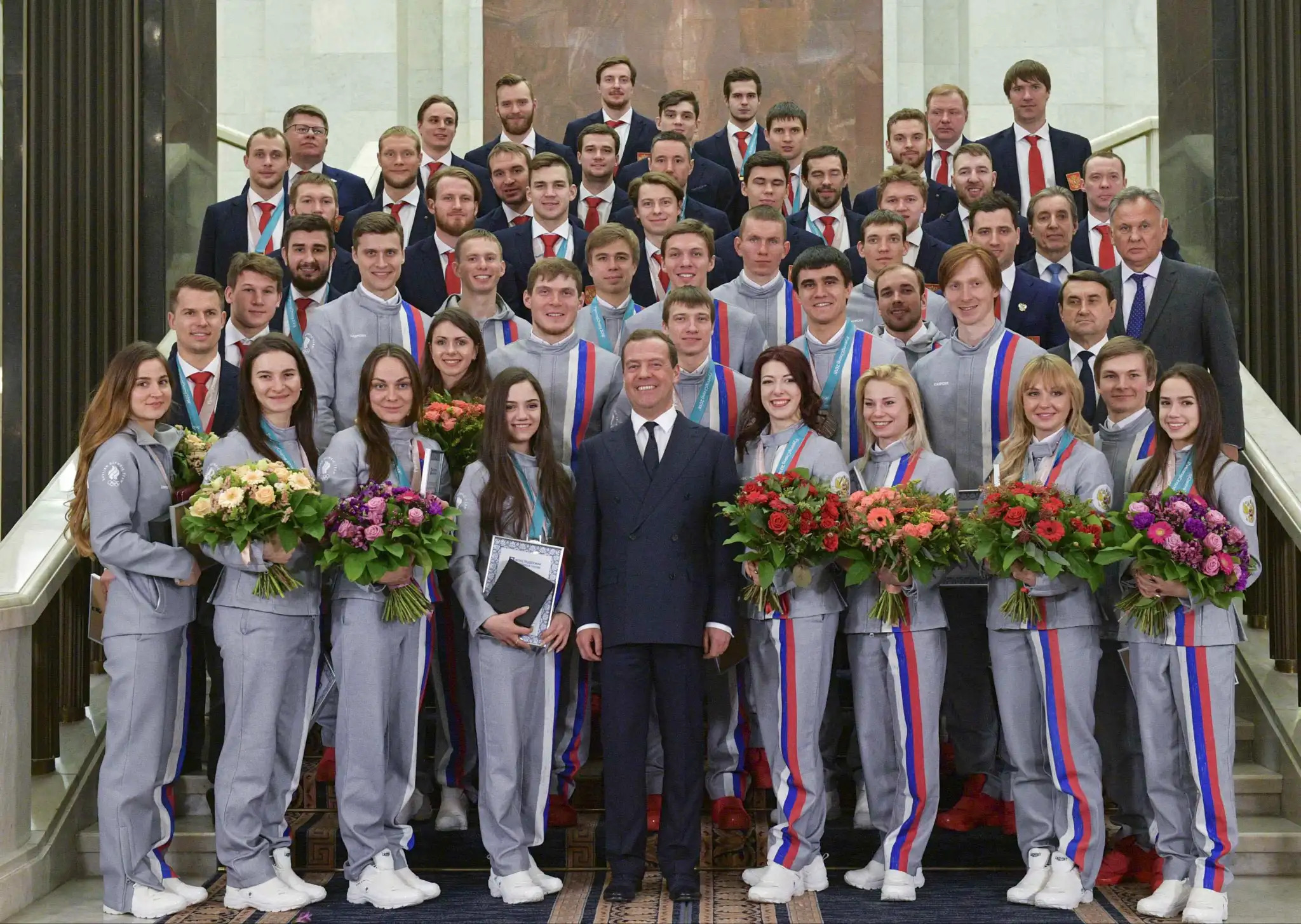
Russian Prime Minister Dmitry Medvedev with medal winners from Russia, 28 February 2018

In the past, Vladimir Putin, the President of Russia, and other officials had said that it would be a humiliation for Russia if its athletes were not allowed to compete under the Russian flag. However, his spokesman later said that no boycott had been discussed. After the IOC decision was announced, Ramzan Kadyrov, the head of Chechnya, announced that no Chechen athletes would participate under a neutral flag. On 6 December, Putin stated that the Russian government would not prevent any athletes from participating at the Games as individuals, but there were calls from other politicians for a boycott. Gennady Zyuganov, a leader of the Communist Party of the Russian Federation, proposed to send fans with a Soviet Victory Banner. Russian Minister of Foreign Affairs Sergey Lavrov has said that the United States "fears honest competition", affirming Vladimir Putin's position who had said that the United States used its influence within the International Olympic Committee to "orchestrate the doping scandal". According to Komsomolskaya Pravda, a popular Russian newspaper, 86% of the Russian population oppose participating in the Olympics under a neutral flag, and many Russian fans attended the Games wearing the Russian colours and chanting "Russia!" in unison, in an act of defiance against the ban.

=== International reactions ===
The IOC's decision was criticized by Jack Robertson, primary investigator of the Russian doping program on behalf of the World Anti-Doping Agency, who said that the IOC has issued "a non-punitive punishment meant to save face while protecting the [IOC’s] and Russia’s commercial and political interests". He also emphasized that Russian whistleblowers provided empirical evidence that "99 percent of [their] national-level teammates were doping." According to Robertson, "[WADA] has discovered that when a Russian athlete [reaches] the national level, he or she [has] no choice in the matter: [it is] either dope, or you’re done". "There is currently no intelligence I have seen or heard about that indicates the state-sponsored doping program has ceased", he added. It was also reported that Russian officials intensively lobbied US politicians in an apparent attempt to achieve Grigory Rodchenkov's (main whistleblower) extradition to Russia.

Justin Peters of Slate magazine wrote that the IOC "ended up with a situation that seemed to negate the entire point of the sanctions against Russia. The IOC did not want there to be a Russian Olympic team at the Pyeongchang Games. And yet the hockey, curling, and figure-skating arenas are full of teams of Russian Olympians ... [this is] a half-hearted wrist slap issued by an entity that appears more interested in saving face than in protecting athletes".

The Court of Arbitration for Sport decision to overturn life bans of 28 Russian athletes and restore their medals met fierce criticism among Olympic officials, including IOC president Thomas Bach who had said this decision is "extremely disappointing and surprising." Grigory Rodchenkov's lawyer has said that "the CAS decision would allow doped athletes to escape without punishment". "[CAS decision] provides yet another ill-gotten gain for the corrupt Russian doping system generally, and Putin specifically", – he added.

== Security ==
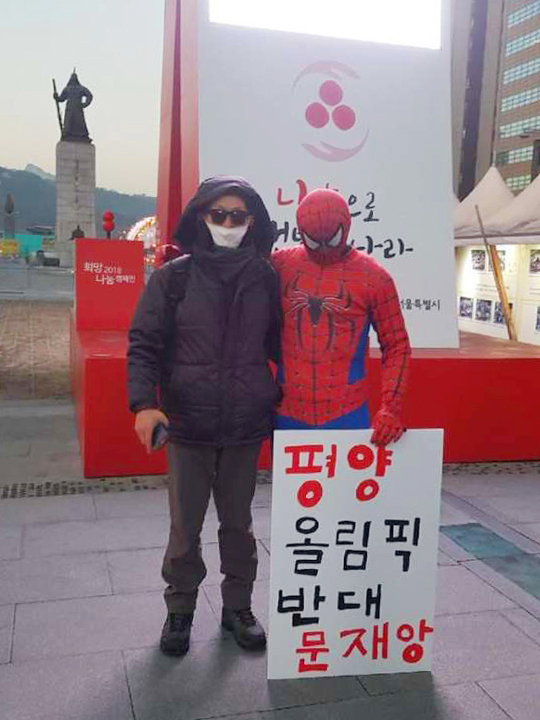
Protesters at Gwanghwamun Plaza criticizing game's pro-North Korean measures, calling it the "Pyongyang Olympics"

On 20 September 2017, South Korea's President Moon Jae-in said the country is pushing to ensure security at Pyeongchang Winter Olympic Games amid rising tensions over nuclear tests and a series of missile launches conducted by North Korea during the summer. However, on the next day, French Minister of Youth Affairs and Sports Laura Flessel-Colovic said France's Winter Olympics team will boycott the games unless South Korea's security is guaranteed.

On 22 September 2017, Austria and Germany joined France in considering not attending the Games. Karl Stoss, head of Austria's national Olympic committee, said that, "if the situation worsens and the security of our athletes is no longer guaranteed, we will not go to South Korea." Several days later, Laura Flessel-Colovic reaffirmed France's participation in the games. Austria and Germany did not boycott the Games.

Kim Yo-jong, the younger sister of dictator Kim Jong-un, attended the opening ceremony and shook hands with the South Korean President Moon Jae-in. This marked the first time since the Korean War that a member of the ruling Kim dynasty had visited South Korea.

== During the Games ==
=== Scheduling and crowds ===
To accommodate primetime broadcasts in the Americas, figure skating events were scheduled with morning start times; figure skating is one of the most popular Winter Olympic sports among U.S. viewers (due to the substantial fees NBC has paid for rights to the Olympics, the IOC has allowed NBC to have influence on event scheduling to maximize U.S. television ratings when possible; NBC agreed to a $7.75 billion contract extension on 7 May 2014, to air the Olympics through the 2032 games, is also one of the major sources of revenue for the IOC). This scheduling practice affected the events themselves, including skaters having to adjust to the modified schedule, as well as the attendance levels of the sessions.

Conversely, and somewhat controversially, eight of the eleven biathlon events were scheduled at night, making it necessary for competitors to ski and shoot under floodlights, with colder temperatures and blustery winds.

=== NBC analyst comment ===
During the opening ceremony, NBC analyst Joshua Cooper Ramo noted that Japan occupied Korea from 1910 to 1945, and then added, "But every Korean will tell you that Japan is a cultural and technological and economic example that has been so important to their own transformation." The Korea Times called the comment "incorrect and insensitive." While Norman Pearlstine, former Time Inc. Editor-in-Chief, stated his opinion that Ramo's comments contained elements of truth, but that he also engaged in needless hyperbole, American media outlets were overwhelmingly critical of Ramo's statements, denouncing them as "clueless", "false", and containing "endless generalities".

In response to this backlash, NBC issued an on-air apology and Ramo was fired from his job at NBC the next day.

=== High winds ===
Many snow events were plagued by high winds, causing dangerous conditions. An opening ceremony took place in extreme cold with a wind chill temperature of −22 °C and some visitors left early because of the harsh cold.

Dutchman Niek van der Velden broke his arm due to a fall caused by the wind and in a training run for the men's slopestyle event. Due to the high winds, many events were delayed. Snowboarding, freestyle skiing, alpine skiing, ski jumping, and biathlon sessions were postponed or even cancelled. On 14 February, the fifth day of the Games, only one Alpine skiing event had been contested (Men's combined) out of the original four.

After the qualification of the women's slopestyle was cancelled, there were still massive winds in the final session. Of the 25 participants, only five managed to stay on their feet during the first run. No snowboarders recorded two clear runs. Several snowboarders said that the final was "irresponsible", "too dangerous" and "should never have been held". According to the FIS, the conditions were "within the norm".

On 14 February there was such a strong wind on the Olympic Park, that spectators were sent inside to shelter for the wind and all activities of the Olympic park were postponed. Parts of tents became detached and temporary structures and Coca-Cola fridges were broken. The media tents had been closed as well due to high winds.

== Other ==
=== Ecological issues at Jeongseon Alpine Centre ===
Environmental groups have raised concerns surrounding the deforestation from the slopes of Gariwang mountain to build the Jeongseon Alpine Centre. Officials claim it is necessary as it is the only slope that will accommodate Olympic requirements, but the Environmental groups disagreed and filed a complaint to the IOC. The South Korean government leased the mountain for the events on the condition that the forest will be restored after the games are done. Environmental groups are skeptical as the forest includes old growth of ancient and rare species.

=== World map omitting Japan ===
The official website of the 2018 PyeongChang Winter Olympic Games posted a world map without the Japanese archipelago. Japanese Chief Cabinet Secretary Suga Yoshihide requested an immediate correction of the map. The PyeongChang organizing committee corrected the map and said it was a "simple mistake".

=== Exclusion of Samsung smartphones to Iranian and North Korean athletes ===
Both the International Olympic Committee and the PyeongChang Organizing Committee decided to exclude Iranian and North Korean athletes from their free giveaway of Samsung Galaxy Note 8 smartphones. The decision was due to the concern and delay over confirming whether giving away mobile devices to Iranian and North Korean athletes would violate the UN sanctions against Iran and North Korea. In response, the Iranian government summoned the South Korean envoy to complain about the situation.

As the IOC confirmed that distributing mobile devices would not violate the UN sanction of Iran, which is being uplifted after Iran's JCPOA in 2015, all participating athletes were given the Galaxy Note 8 regardless of their nationalities. However, due to the still active UN sanction, North Korean athletes were given the smart phones on the condition that they would return the devices to the organizing committee before going back to their home country.

=== Dog meat trade ===
The Winter Olympics have again caused comments about the dog meat trade issue in Korea. Speed skater Jan Blokhuijsen made a comment during a press conference to the host South Koreans to "treat dogs better in this country", criticizing dog meat eating culture of South Korea. However Blokhuijsen apologized soon after he was criticized by public. In the run-up to the Olympics, South Korea closed its biggest dog meat market. More than 800,000 dogs were being kept in the market which accounts for about a third of the country's dog meat consumption.

=== Kim Jong-un impersonator ===
On 14 February 2018, a man impersonating Kim Jong-un was ejected from the stands after walking through the North Korean cheerleading squad.

=== Violence by IOC member ===
On 15 February 2018, IOC member Adam Pengilly was not allowed to enter the parking lot, since the route was only for buses, not pedestrians. Denied by security, Pengilly blamed and shoved security. According to security, Pengilly said to the security "If you report this incident to authority, you won't be able to work in Korea.". After the investigation, Pengilly was sent home from the Pyeongchang Winter Olympics and apologised for his action, but denied a confrontation. IOC President Thomas Bach met with the security official on 17 February to apologize in person.

=== Canada’s Kim Boutin receiving online death threats from South Korean fans ===
Kim Boutin won the bronze medal in the 500-metre short-track speed skating event after South Korea's Choi Min-jeong was disqualified for interfering with Boutin. Shortly after, Boutin's social media accounts were inundated with hateful comments and death threats from angry South Korean fans. The International Olympic Committee issued a statement urging everyone to respect the athletes and their performances.

=== South Korean skaters skip a lyric to avoid offending Japan ===
South Korean ice dancers Yura Min and Alexander Gamelin performed their routine containing Sohyang's rendition of Arirang Alone by Seo Yu-seok with an omitted line. A spokesman from the Korea Skating Union told the skaters to "prepare a version without the lyrics to avoid political controversy", a line in the lyrics containing a reference to the disputed islands of the Liancourt Rocks (known as Dokdo in Korean and Takeshima in Japanese), over which both nations, as well as North Korea, claim sovereignty. The pair omitted the lyric without any problems.
