= Kim Dong-hyun (bobsledder) =

South Korean bobsledder (born 1987)

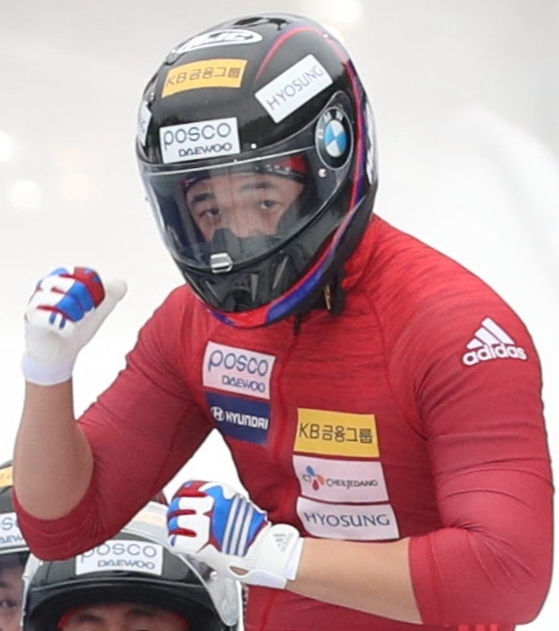

Personal information
- Nationality: South Korean
- Born: 12 November 1987 (age 38) Seoul, South Korea
- Height: 1.84 m (6 ft 0 in)
- Weight: 103 kg (227 lb)

Sport
- Country: South Korea
- Sport: Bobsleigh
Medal record
Olympic Games
Silver medal – second place	2018 Pyeongchang	Four-man

- Kim Dong-hyun
- Hangul: 김동현
- RR: Gim Donghyeon
- MR: Kim Tonghyŏn

Kim Dong-hyun (Korean: 김동현; born 12 November 1987) is a South Korean bobsledder who has competed since 2008. At the 2010 Winter Olympics in Vancouver, he finished 19th in the four-man event.

== Career ==
Kim finished 30th in the two-man event at the FIBT World Championships 2009 in Lake Placid, New York. His best World Cup finish was 26th in the two-man event at Whistler, British Columbia in 2009.

At the 2018 Winter Olympics in Pyeongchang, the South Korean four-man team of Seo Young-woo, Won Yun-jong, Jun Jung-lin, and Kim Dong-hyun won a surprising silver medal in the four-man event, tying with a German team led by Nico Walther. With the silver medal, South Korea became the first Asian nation to claim an Olympic medal in a bobsleigh event.
