= Han Chun-gyong =

North Korean cross-country skier (born 1994)

Personal information
- Nationality: North Korean
- Born: 28 March 1994 (age 32)

Sport
- Sport: Cross-country skiing

Han Chun-gyong (Korean: 한춘경, born 28 March 1994) is a North Korean cross-country skier. He competed in the men's 15 kilometre freestyle at the 2018 Winter Olympics.
