= Cross-country skiing at the 2018 Winter Olympics – Men's 15 kilometre freestyle =

Men's 15 kilometre freestyle at the XXIII Olympic Winter Games
- Cross-country skiing
- Venue: Alpensia Cross-Country Skiing Centre
- Dates: 16 February 2018
- Competitors: 119 from 62 nations
- Winning time: 33:43.9

Medalists
1st place, gold medalist(s)		Dario Cologna	Switzerland
2nd place, silver medalist(s)		Simen Hegstad Krüger	Norway
3rd place, bronze medalist(s)		Denis Spitsov	Olympic Athletes from Russia

The men's 15 kilometre freestyle cross-country skiing competition at the 2018 Winter Olympics was held on 16 February 2018 at 15:00 KST at the Alpensia Cross-Country Skiing Centre in Pyeongchang, South Korea.

In the victory ceremony, the medals were presented by Gian-Franco Kasper, member of the Executive Board of the International Olympic Committee, accompanied by Urs Lehmann, President of the Swiss Ski Association.

== Qualification ==
A total of up to 310 cross-country skiers qualified across all eleven events. Athletes qualified for this event by having met the A qualification standard, which meant having 100 or less FIS Points or meeting the B standard, which meant 300 or less FIS points in the distance classification. Countries not meeting the A standard were allowed to enter a maximum of one B standard athlete per gender. The Points list takes into average the best results of athletes per discipline during the qualification period (1 July 2016 to 21 January 2018). Countries received additional quotas by having athletes ranked in the top 30 of the FIS Olympics Points list (two per gender maximum, overall across all events). Countries also received an additional quota (one per gender maximum) if an athlete was ranked in the top 300 of the FIS Olympics Points list. After the distribution of B standard quotas, the remaining quotas were distributed using the Olympic FIS Points list, with each athlete only counting once for qualification purposes. A country could only enter a maximum of four athletes for the event.

== Competition schedule ==
All times are (UTC+9).

Date	Time	Event
16 February	15:00	Final

== Results ==
The race was started at 15:00.

Rank	Bib	Name	Country	Time	Deficit
1st place, gold medalist(s)	68	Dario Cologna	Switzerland	33:43.9	—
2nd place, silver medalist(s)	60	Simen Hegstad Krüger	Norway	34:02.2	+18.3
3rd place, bronze medalist(s)	48	Denis Spitsov	Olympic Athletes from Russia	34:06.9	+23.0
4	62	Martin Johnsrud Sundby	Norway	34:08.8	+24.9
5	70	Maurice Manificat	France	34:10.9	+27.0
6	64	Hans Christer Holund	Norway	34:18.4	+34.5
7	66	Alex Harvey	Canada	34:19.4	+35.5
8	52	Marcus Hellner	Sweden	34:22.6	+38.7
9	44	Calle Halfvarsson	Sweden	34:44.5	+1:00.6
10	42	Matti Heikkinen	Finland	34:45.4	+1:01.5
11	50	Daniel Rickardsson	Sweden	34:55.1	+1:11.2
12	20	Roman Furger	Switzerland	34:56.3	+1:12.4
13	38	Keishin Yoshida	Japan	34:59.1	+1:15.2
14	31	Andrey Melnichenko	Olympic Athletes from Russia	35:02.1	+1:18.2
15	33	Lucas Bögl	Germany	35:04.7	+1:20.8
16	39	Martin Jakš	Czech Republic	35:05.2	+1:21.3
17	29	Adrien Backscheider	France	35:12.0	+1:28.1
18	46	Finn Hågen Krogh	Norway	35:14.4	+1:30.5
19	36	Jens Burman	Sweden	35:15.7	+1:31.8
20	54	Andrey Larkov	Olympic Athletes from Russia	35:25.1	+1:41.2
21	27	Scott Patterson	United States	35:28.0	+1:44.1
DSQ	25	Karel Tammjärv	Estonia	35:29.4	+1:45.5
22	58	Jean-Marc Gaillard	France	35:35.2	+1:51.3
23	55	Petr Knop	Czech Republic	35:35.5	+1:51.6
24	28	Andreas Katz	Germany	35:38.3	+1:54.4
25	40	Clément Parisse	France	35:39.0	+1:55.1
26	22	Irineu Esteve Altimiras	Andorra	35:40.7	+1:56.8
27	56	Andrew Musgrave	Great Britain	35:51.0	+2:07.1
DSQ	23	Max Hauke	Austria	35:57.5	+2:13.6
28	6	Aleš Razým	Czech Republic	35:59.0	+2:15.1
29	37	Lari Lehtonen	Finland	36:01.8	+2:17.9
30	7	Sebastian Eisenlauer	Germany	36:03.8	+2:19.9
31	69	Dominik Bury	Poland	36:11.1	+2:27.2
32	34	Toni Livers	Switzerland	36:14.5	+2:30.6
33	21	Perttu Hyvärinen	Finland	36:17.2	+2:33.3
34	13	Veselin Tzinzov	Bulgaria	36:17.3	+2:33.4
35	19	Paul Constantin Pepene	Romania	36:19.1	+2:35.2
36	5	Graeme Killick	Canada	36:23.3	+2:39.4
37	49	Bernhard Tritscher	Austria	36:24.7	+2:40.8
38	15	Michail Semenov	Belarus	36:25.8	+2:41.9
39	35	Erik Bjornsen	United States	36:28.6	+2:44.7
DSQ	9	Dominik Baldauf	Austria	36:31.2	+2:47.3
40	74	Alin Florin Cioancă	Romania	36:31.9	+2:48.0
41	4	Mirco Bertolina	Italy	36:33.5	+2:49.6
42	71	Kim Magnus	South Korea	36:39.0	+2:55.1
43	1	Michal Novák	Czech Republic	36:42.4	+2:58.5
44	89	Krešimir Crnković	Croatia	36:44.7	+3:00.8
45	14	Noah Hoffman	United States	36:45.2	+3:01.3
46	32	Alexey Vitsenko	Olympic Athletes from Russia	36:46.4	+3:02.5
47	26	Candide Pralong	Switzerland	36:47.7	+3:03.8
48	18	Anssi Pentsinen	Finland	36:54.9	+3:11.0
49	90	Martin Vögeli	Liechtenstein	36:57.0	+3:13.1
50	65	Edi Dadić	Croatia	36:57.2	+3:13.3
51	11	Vitaliy Pukhkalo	Kazakhstan	36:57.4	+3:13.5
52	16	Yury Astapenka	Belarus	37:04.0	+3:20.1
53	12	Snorri Einarsson	Iceland	37:05.6	+3:21.7
54	57	Andrew Young	Great Britain	37:13.1	+3:29.2
DSQ	10	Andreas Veerpalu	Estonia	37:16.2	+3:32.3
55	3	Raido Ränkel	Estonia	37:21.9	+3:38.0
56	67	Stefan Zelger	Italy	37:27.9	+3:44.0
57	17	Yevgeniy Velichko	Kazakhstan	37:28.6	+3:44.7
58	61	Imanol Rojo	Spain	37:35.5	+3:51.6
59	76	Thomas Hjalmar Westgård	Ireland	37:36.6	+3:52.7
60	59	Denis Volotka	Kazakhstan	37:39.8	+3:55.9
61	72	Indulis Bikše	Latvia	37:44.7	+4:00.8
62	94	Thierry Langer	Belgium	37:45.0	+4:01.1
63	73	Peter Mlynár	Slovakia	37:46.2	+4:02.3
64	2	Damir Rastić	Serbia	37:47.5	+4:03.6
65	80	Knute Johnsgaard	Canada	37:48.5	+4:04.6
66	83	Callum Watson	Australia	37:53.9	+4:10.0
67	24	Devon Kershaw	Canada	38:01.5	+4:17.6
68	8	Sergio Rigoni	Italy	38:03.0	+4:19.1
69	53	Aliaksandr Voranau	Belarus	38:05.5	+4:21.6
70	43	Tyler Kornfield	United States	38:17.9	+4:34.0
71	87	Callum Smith	Great Britain	38:20.9	+4:37.0
72	82	Mladen Plakalović	Bosnia and Herzegovina	38:27.7	+4:43.8
73	81	Phillip Bellingham	Australia	38:36.2	+4:52.3
74	77	Kamil Bury	Poland	38:38.7	+4:54.8
75	98	Mark Chanloung	Thailand	38:40.8	+4:56.9
76	85	Miroslav Šulek	Slovakia	38:44.0	+5:00.1
77	79	Apostolos Angelis	Greece	38:56.4	+5:12.5
78	97	Maciej Staręga	Poland	38:58.9	+5:15.0
79	91	Mikayel Mikayelyan	Armenia	39:01.4	+5:17.5
80	47	Oleksiy Krasovsky	Ukraine	39:05.3	+5:21.4
81	95	Kim Eun-ho	South Korea	39:07.9	+5:24.0
82	45	Andriy Orlyk	Ukraine	39:11.3	+5:27.4
83	84	Andrej Segeč	Slovakia	39:13.4	+5:29.5
84	86	Miha Šimenc	Slovenia	39:16.9	+5:33.0
85	96	Ádám Kónya	Hungary	39:27.2	+5:43.3
86	99	Martin Møller	Denmark	39:35.4	+5:51.5
87	78	Seyed Sattar Seyd	Iran	39:39.1	+5:55.2
88	63	Hamza Dursun	Turkey	40:05.3	+6:21.4
89	51	Ömer Ayçiçek	Turkey	40:28.7	+6:44.8
90	92	Mantas Strolia	Lithuania	40:31.4	+6:47.5
91	41	Yordan Chuchuganov	Bulgaria	40:39.6	+6:55.7
92	102	Modestas Vaičiulis	Lithuania	40:53.0	+7:09.1
93	100	Achbadrakh Batmunkh	Mongolia	41:40.4	+7:56.5
94	104	Sun Qinghai	China	41:55.7	+8:11.8
95	93	Stavre Jada	Macedonia	42:14.2	+8:30.3
96	103	Matías Zuloaga	Argentina	42:27.5	+8:43.6
97	117	Han Chun-gyong	North Korea	42:29.2	+8:45.3
98	101	Yonathan Jesús Fernández	Chile	42:49.9	+9:06.0
99	116	Jagdish Singh	India	43:00.3	+9:16.4
100	106	Tucker Murphy	Bermuda	43:05.7	+9:21.8
101	111	Timo Juhani Grönlund	Bolivia	43:18.4	+9:34.5
102	109	Nicolae Gaiduc	Moldova	43:43.3	+9:59.4
103	118	Pak Il-chol	North Korea	43:43.4	+9:59.5
104	119	Syed Human	Pakistan	45:19.1	+11:35.2
105	108	Samer Tawk	Lebanon	47:03.4	+13:19.5
106	105	Victor Santos	Brazil	47:09.9	+13:26.0
107	113	Samir Azzimani	Morocco	47:39.9	+13:56.0
108	107	Klaus Jungbluth	Ecuador	53:30.1	+19:46.2
109	112	Kequyen Lam	Portugal	54:34.1	+20:50.2
110	110	Pita Taufatofua	Tonga	56:41.1	+22:57.2
111	114	Sebastián Uprimny	Colombia	58:08.1	+24:24.2
112	115	Germán Madrazo	Mexico	59:35.4	+25:51.5
	30	Dietmar Nöckler	Italy	DNF	
	75	Martí Vigo del Arco	Spain	DNF	
	88	Wang Qiang	China	DSQ	
