= Pak Il-chol =

North Korean cross-country skier

Personal information
- Nationality: North Korean
- Born: 26 March 1996 (age 29)

Sport
- Sport: Cross-country skiing

Pak Il-chol (Korean: 박일철, born 26 March 1996) is a North Korean cross-country skier. He competed in the men's 15 kilometre freestyle at the 2018 Winter Olympics.
