= Han Jong-in =

North Korean figure skater (born 1978)

Personal information
- Born: August 9, 1978 (age 47) Pyongyang, North Korea
- Height: 171 cm (5.61 ft)

Figure skating career
- Country: North Korea
- Coach: Paek Un-yong
- Skating club: Pyongyang City Club

Korean name
- Hangul: 한정인
- RR: Han Jeongin
- MR: Han Chŏngin

Han Jong-in (born August 9, 1978) is a North Korean figure skater. He represented unified Korea at the 2006 Winter Olympics, where he had the honor of bearing the special Unification Flag alongside South Korean speed skater, Lee Bo-ra.

At the Olympics, he placed last in the short program and did not advance to the free skating.

== Results ==
Event	1995–96	2000–01	2002–03	2003–04	2004–05	2005–06
Winter Olympic Games						30th
Asian Championships	7th					
North Korean Championships		1st	2nd	1st	1st	1st
Trophée Lalique		12th	11th			
Karl Schäfer Memorial						4th
Triglav Trophy				2nd		
