= Jun Jung-lin =

South Korean bobsledder

Personal information
- Nationality: South Korean
- Born: 27 January 1989 (age 37) Busan, South Korea
- Height: 1.84 m (6 ft 0 in)
- Weight: 100 kg (220 lb)

Sport
- Country: South Korea
- Sport: Bobsleigh
- Position: Brakeman (two-man); Pusher (four-man)
- Coached by: (Canada) Pierre Lueders
Medal record
Olympic Games
Silver medal – second place	2018 Pyeongchang	Four-man

Korean name
- Hangul: 전정린
- RR: Jeon Jeongrin
- MR: Chŏn Chŏngnin

Jun Jung-lin (born 27 January 1989) is a South Korean bobsledder who competes as the brakeman for the two-man bobsled piloted by Kim Dong-hyun as well as a push crewman for the four-man bobsled piloted by Won Yun-jong.

== Career ==
Jun became interested in bobsleigh as a junior at Yonsei University in 2011 when fellow Yonsei alumnus and bobsled pilot Kim Dong-hyun suggested he give it a try. In May 2012 Jun participated in a South Korean national bobsleigh team try-out and was selected for the national team.

After a five-month training, Jun made his World Cup debut at Lake Placid in November 2012. Jun, along with pilot Won Yun-jong, finished 21st out of 27 teams in the two-man event and 22nd out of 24 teams in the four-man event, as the brakeman.

Jun teamed up with South Korea's second-string pilot Kim Dong-hyun, and won his first international gold medal at the 2013 North American Cup, finishing 0.12 seconds ahead of the Monegasque duo of Patrice Servelle and Sébastien Gattuso. Although Jun along with Kim earned a spot on the 2013–14 World Cup tour, the duo failed to make an impact like they did in the previous second-tier competitions, finishing 32nd in the overall standings.

Jun competed at the 2014 Winter Olympics for South Korea. He teamed with pilot Kim in the South Korea-2 sled in the two-man event, finishing 23rd, and with pilot Won Yun-jong, Seo Young-woo and Suk Young-jin in the four-man, finishing 18th.

Jun & Kim flourished after the 2014 Winter Olympics under the leadership of British coach Malcolm "Gomer" Lloyd who vastly improved the South Korean bobsleigh team by implementing customized training methods. Following a respectable 16th-place finish in 2015–16 World Cup season series, Jun & Kim had back-to-back top-10 finishes on the first two events at Whistler and Lake Placid in the 2016–17 World Cup season. But if anything, their performances gradually deteriorated in the second half of the 2016–17 season when the duo began to use the domestic sled that was manufactured by the Hyundai Motor Company, South Korea's largest automaker. Following coach Lloyd's sudden death from cancer in 2016, South Korean national team hired numerous bobsled experts. However, they failed to fill the leadership void left by Lloyd, and Jun & Kim struggled to bounce back from the slump throughout the remainder of the season.

Jun & Kim opted to miss the two-man competitions at the 2017–18 World Cup season in order to focus on the four-man event at the 2018 Winter Olympics. At the Olympics in Pyeongchang on 25 February 2018, the South Korean four-man team of Jun, Kim, Seo Young-woo and pilot Won Yun-jong won a surprising silver medal in the four-man event, tying with a German team led by Nico Walther. With the silver medal, South Korea became the first Asian nation to claim an Olympic medal in a bobsleigh event.
