= Won Yun-jong =

South Korean bobsledder

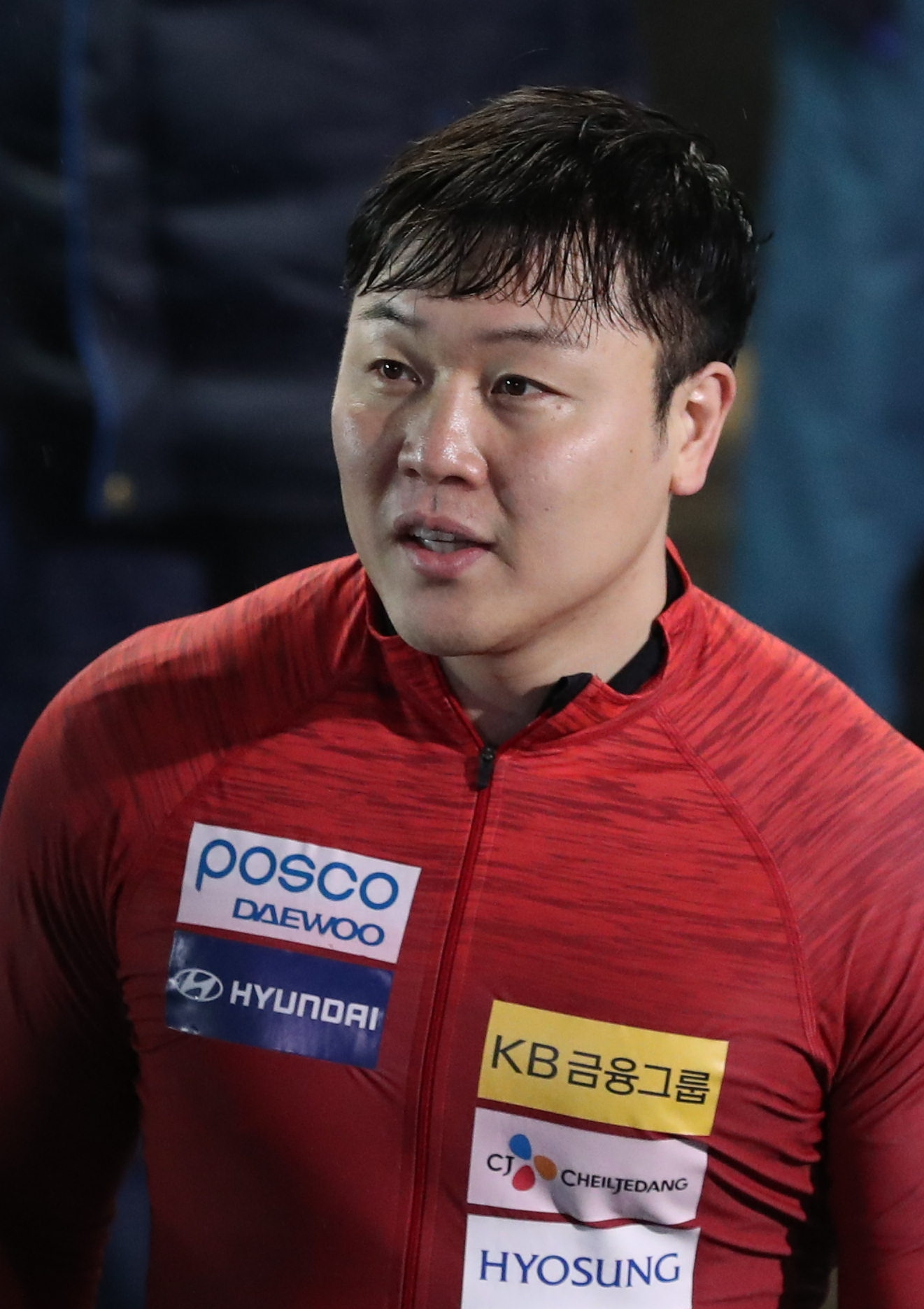

Personal information
- Nationality: South Korean
- Born: 17 June 1985 (age 41) Jungnang-gu, Seoul, South Korea
- Height: 1.82 m (6 ft 0 in)
- Weight: 107 kg (236 lb)

Korean name
- Hangul: 원윤종
- Hanja: 元潤鐘
- RR: Won Yunjong
- MR: Wŏn Yunjong

Sport
- Country: South Korea
- Sport: Bobsleigh (driver)
Medal record
Olympic Games
Silver medal – second place	2018 Pyeongchang	Four-man

Won Yun-jong (born 17 June 1985) is a South Korean bobsledder.

Won competed at the 2014 Winter Olympics for South Korea. He teamed with brakeman Seo Young-woo in the South Korea-1 sled in the two-man event, finishing 18th, and with Seo, Jun Jung-lin and Suk Young-ji in the four-man, finishing 20th.

As of 2017, his best showing at the World Championships is 5th, in the two-man event in 2015.

Won made his World Cup debut in December 2010. As of 2017, his best World Cup finish is 1st, in 2015-16 at Whistler and Konigssee, Germany. He was the overall champion of the 2015-16 season for the two-man category.

Along with teammate Seo, Won placed sixth out of 30 teams in the two-man event at the 2018 Winter Olympics in Pyeongchang on 19 February, recording an overall time of 3:17.40 in four runs. Although they failed to win a medal, it was the best Olympic result by an Asian bobsleigh team. The following week, on 25 February, the South Korean four-man team of pilot Won, Seo, Kim Dong-hyun and Jun Jung-lin won a surprising silver medal in the four-man event, tying with a German team led by Nico Walther. With the silver medal, South Korea became the first Asian nation to claim an Olympic medal in a bobsleigh event.

Olympic Games
Preceded by (South Korea) Lee Kyou-hyuk (North Korea) Ri Song-chol	Flagbearer for Korea; 2018 Pyeongchang (with Hwang Chung-gum)	Succeeded by Incumbent
