= 2018 Winter Olympics closing ceremony flag bearers =

During the closing ceremony of the 2018 Winter Olympics in Pyeongchang, the flag bearers of 92 National Olympic Committees (NOCs) arrived into Pyeongchang Olympic Stadium on February 25. The flag bearers from each participating country entered the stadium informally in single file, and behind them marched all the athletes. The flags of each country were not necessarily carried by the same flag bearer as in the opening ceremony. The flag-bearers entered in ganada order of the Korean alphabet.

Unlike the opening ceremony, North and South Korea used their own flags in addition to the Korean Unification Flag. Thus there were a total of 93 flag bearers representing 92 NOCs, with the North Korean flag and Korean Unification Flag appearing earlier in the parade order, and the South Korean flag appearing last.

== Countries and flagbearers ==
The following is a list of each country's flag bearer. The list is sorted by the order in which each nation appears in the parade of nations. Names are given as were officially designated by the International Olympic Committee (IOC).

| Order | Nation | Hangul | Roman Transliteration (in RR) | Flag bearer | Sport |
|---|---|---|---|---|---|
| 1 | Greece | 그리스 | Geuriseu | Ioannis Antoniou | Alpine skiing |
| 2 | Ghana | 가나 | Gana | Akwasi Frimpong | Skeleton |
| 3 | Nigeria | 나이지리아 | Naijiria | Simidele Adeagbo | Skeleton |
| 4 | South Africa | 남아프리카 공화국 | Nam-Apeurika Gonghwaguk | Connor Wilson | Alpine skiing |
| 5 | Netherlands | 네덜란드 | Nedeollandeu | Ireen Wüst | Speed skating |
| 6 | Norway | 노르웨이 | Noreuwei | Marit Bjørgen | Cross-country skiing |
| 7 | New Zealand | 뉴질랜드 | Nyujillaendeu | Zoi Sadowski-Synnott | Snowboarding |
| 8 | Denmark | 덴마크 | Denmakeu | Viktor Hald Thorup | Speed skating |
| 9 | Germany | 독일 | Dogil | Christian Ehrhoff | Ice hockey |
| 10 | Timor-Leste | 동티모르 | Dong-Timoreu | Yohan Goutt Gonçalves | Alpine skiing |
| 11 | Latvia | 라트비아 | Rateubia | Haralds Silovs | Speed skating |
| 12 | Lebanon | 레바논 | Rebanon | POCOG Volunteer | N/A |
| 13 | Romania | 루마니아 | Rumania | Raluca Strămăturaru | Luge |
| 14 | Luxembourg | 룩셈부르크 | Ruksembureukeu | Matthieu Osch | Alpine skiing |
| 15 | Lithuania | 리투아니아 | Rituania | Andrej Drukarov | Alpine skiing |
| 16 | Liechtenstein | 리히텐슈타인 | Rihitensyutain | POCOG Volunteer | N/A |
| 17 | Madagascar | 마다가스카르 | Madagaseukareu | Mialitiana Clerc | Alpine skiing |
| 18 | Malaysia | 말레이시아 | Malleisia | Julian Yee | Figure skating |
| 19 | Mexico | 멕시코 | Meksiko | Rodolfo Dickson | Alpine skiing |
| 20 | Monaco | 모나코 | Monako | Boris Vain | Bobsleigh |
| 21 | Morocco | 모로코 | Moroko | Adam Lamhamedi | Alpine skiing |
| 22 | Montenegro | 몬테네그로 | Montenegeuro | Eldar Salihović | Alpine skiing |
| 23 | Moldova | 몰도바 | Moldoba | Nicolae Gaiduc | Cross-country skiing |
| 24 | Malta | 몰타 | Molta | Élise Pellegrin | Alpine skiing |
| 25 | Mongolia | 몽골 | Monggol | Chinbatyn Otgontsetseg | Cross-country skiing |
| 26 | United States | 미국 | Miguk | Jessie Diggins | Cross-country skiing |
| 27 | Bermuda | 버뮤다 | Beomyuda | Tucker Murphy | Cross-country skiing |
| 28 | Belgium | 벨기에 | Belgie | Bart Swings | Speed skating |
| 29 | Belarus | 벨라루스 | Bellaruseu | Darya Domracheva | Biathlon |
| 30 | Bosnia and Herzegovina | 보스니아 헤르체고비나 | Boseunia Hereuchegobina | Elvedina Muzaferija | Alpine skiing |
| 31 | Bolivia | 볼리비아 | Bollibia | Timo Grönlund | Cross-country skiing |
| 32 | Bulgaria | 불가리아 | Bulgaria | Yordan Chuchuganov | Cross-country skiing |
| 33 | Brazil | 브라질 | Beurajil | Isadora Williams | Figure skating |
| 34 | San Marino | 산마리노 | Sanmarino | Alessandro Mariotti | Alpine skiing |
| 35 | Serbia | 세르비아 | Sereubia | Nevena Ignjatović | Alpine skiing |
| 36 | Sweden | 스웨덴 | Seuweden | Charlotte Kalla | Cross-country skiing |
| 37 | Switzerland | 스위스 | Seuwiseu | Ramon Zenhäusern | Alpine skiing |
| 38 | Spain | 스페인 | Seupein | Javier Fernández | Figure skating |
| 39 | Slovakia | 슬로바키아 | Seullobakia | Petra Vlhová | Alpine skiing |
| 40 | Slovenia | 슬로베니아 | Seullobenia | Filip Flisar | Freestyle skiing |
| 41 | Singapore | 싱가포르 | Singgaporeu | POCOG Volunteer | N/A |
| 42 | Armenia | 아르메니아 | Areumenia | Mikayel Mikayelyan | Cross-country skiing |
| 43 | Argentina | 아르헨티나 | Areuhentina | Verónica María Ravenna | Luge |
| 44 | Iceland | 아이슬란드 | Aiseullandeu | Snorri Einarsson | Cross-country skiing |
| 45 | Ireland | 아일랜드 | Aillaendeu | Brendan Newby | Freestyle skiing |
| 46 | Azerbaijan | 아제르바이잔 | Ajereubaijan | POCOG Volunteer | N/A |
| 47 | Andorra | 안도라 | Andora | Irineu Altimiras | Cross-country skiing |
| 48 | Albania | 알바니아 | Albania | Suela Mëhilli | Alpine skiing |
| 49 | Eritrea | 에리트레아 | Eriteurea | Shannon-Ogbnai Abeda | Alpine skiing |
| 50 | Estonia | 에스토니아 | Eseutonia | Saskia Alusalu | Speed skating |
| 51 | Ecuador | 에콰도르 | Ekwadoreu | Klaus Jungbluth | Cross-country skiing |
| 52 | Great Britain | 영국 | Yeongguk | Billy Morgan | Snowboarding |
| 53 | Australia | 오스트레일리아 | Oseuteureillia | Jarryd Hughes | Snowboarding |
| 54 | Austria | 오스트리아 | Oseuteuria | Madeleine Egle | Luge |
| 55 | Olympic Athletes from Russia | 러시아 출신 올림픽 선수 | Reosia Chulsin Ollimpik Seonsu | POCOG Volunteer | N/A |
| 56 | Uzbekistan | 우즈베키스탄 | Ujeubekiseutan | POCOG Volunteer | N/A |
| 57 | Ukraine | 우크라이나 | Ukeuraina | Oleksandr Abramenko | Freestyle skiing |
| 58 | Iran | 이란 | Iran | POCOG Volunteer | N/A |
| 59 | Italy | 이탈리아 | Itallia | Carolina Kostner | Figure skating |
| 60 | Israel | 이스라엘 | Iseura'el | Itamar Biran | Alpine skiing |
| 61 | India | 인도 | Indo | POCOG Volunteer | N/A |
| 62 | Japan | 일본 | Ilbon | Nao Kodaira | Speed skating |
| 63 | Jamaica | 자메이카 | Jameika | Carrie Russell | Bobsleigh |
| 64 | North Korea | 조선민주주의인민공화국 | Joseonminjujuuiinmingonghwagugk | Kim Ju-sik | Figure skating |
| 65 | Georgia | 조지아 | Jojia | Iason Abramashvili | Alpine skiing |
| 66 | China | 중국 | Jungguk | Wu Dajing | Short track speed skating |
| 67 | Czech Republic | 체코 | Cheko | Ester Ledecká | Snowboarding; Alpine skiing |
| 68 | Chile | 칠레 | Chille | Claudia Salcedo | Cross-country skiing |
| 69 | Kazakhstan | 카자흐스탄 | Kajaheuseutan | Abzal Azhgaliyev | Short track speed skating |
| 70 | Canada | 캐나다 | Kaenada | Kim Boutin | Short track speed skating |
| 71 | Kenya | 케냐 | Kenya | POCOG Volunteer | N/A |
| 72 | Korea | 코리아 | Koria | POCOG Volunteer | N/A |
| 73 | Kosovo | 코소보 | Kosobo | Albin Tahiri | Alpine skiing |
| 74 | Colombia | 콜롬비아 | Kollombia | Michael Poettoz | Alpine skiing |
| 75 | Croatia | 크로아티아 | Keuroatia | Dražen Silić | Bobsleigh |
| 76 | Kyrgyzstan | 키르기스스탄 | Kireugiseuseutan | Evgeniy Timofeev | Alpine skiing |
| 77 | Cyprus | 키프로스 | Kipeuroseu | Dinos Lefkaritis | Alpine skiing |
| 78 | Chinese Taipei | 차이니스 타이베이 | Chainiseu Taibei | Huang Yu-Ting | Speed skating |
| 79 | Thailand | 태국 | Taeguk | Mark Chanloung | Cross-country skiing |
| 80 | Turkey | 터키 | Teoki | Hamza Dursun | Cross-country skiing |
| 81 | Togo | 토고 | Togo | Mathilde-Amivi Petitjean | Cross-country skiing |
| 82 | Tonga | 통가 | Tongga | Pita Taufatofua | Cross-country skiing |
| 83 | Pakistan | 파키스탄 | Pakiseutan | Muhammad Karim | Alpine skiing |
| 84 | Portugal | 포르투갈 | Poreutugal | Arthur Hanse | Alpine skiing |
| 85 | Poland | 폴란드 | Pollandeu | Mateusz Luty | Bobsleigh |
| 86 | Puerto Rico | 푸에르토리코 | Puereutoriko | Charles Flaherty | Alpine skiing |
| 87 | France | 프랑스 | Peurangseu | Gabriella Papadakis; Guillaume Cizeron | Figure skating |
| 88 | Macedonia | 구유고슬라비아 마케도니아 공화국 | Gu-Yugoseullabia Makedonia Gonghwaguk | POCOG Volunteer | N/A |
| 89 | Finland | 핀란드 | Pillandeu | Mika Poutala | Speed skating |
| 90 | Philippines | 필리핀 | Pillipin | Asa Miller | Alpine skiing |
| 91 | Hungary | 헝가리 | Heonggari | POCOG Volunteer | N/A |
| 92 | Hong Kong | 홍콩 차이나 | Hongkong Chaina | POCOG Volunteer | N/A |
| 93 | South Korea | 대한민국 | Daehanmingguk | Lee Seung-hoon | Speed skating |
