= Speed skating at the 2018 Winter Olympics =

Speed skating at the XXIII Olympic Winter Games
- Speed skating pictogram at the 2018 Winter Olympics
- Venue: Gangneung Oval
- Dates: 10–24 February 2018
- No. of events: 14 (7 men, 7 women)
- Competitors: 184 from 29 nations

Speed skating at the 2018 Winter Olympics was held at the Gangneung Oval in Gangneung, South Korea between 10 and 24 February 2018.

== Qualification ==
A total quota of 180 athletes were allowed to compete at the Games (maximum 100 men and 80 women). Countries were assigned quotas based on the results of the entire 2017–18 ISU Speed Skating World Cup in the autumn of 2017. Each nation was permitted to enter a maximum of three athletes per gender for all events apart from the 5000m, 10,000m and mass start events, for which they could enter a maximum of two athletes per event.

== Competition schedule ==
The following was the competition schedule for all speed skating events. With the exception of the Team pursuit events, all rounds of each event were concluded within a single session.

All times are (UTC+9).

Day	Date	Start	Event
Day 1	Saturday, 10 February 2018	20:00	Women's 3000 metres
Day 2	Sunday, 11 February 2018	16:00	Men's 5000 metres
Day 3	Monday, 12 February 2018	21:30	Women's 1500 metres
Day 4	Tuesday, 13 February 2018	20:00	Men's 1500 metres
Day 5	Wednesday, 14 February 2018	19:00	Women's 1000 metres
Day 6	Thursday, 15 February 2018	20:00	Men's 10,000 metres
Day 7	Friday, 16 February 2018	20:00	Women's 5000 metres
Day 9	Sunday, 18 February 2018	20:00	Team pursuit men – Heats
Day 9	Sunday, 18 February 2018	20:00	Women's 500 metres
Day 10	Monday, 19 February 2018	20:00	Team pursuit women – Heats
Day 10	Monday, 19 February 2018	20:00	Men's 500 metres
Day 12	Wednesday, 21 February 2018	20:00	Team pursuit men – Finals
Day 12	Wednesday, 21 February 2018	20:00	Team pursuit women – Finals
Day 14	Friday, 23 February 2018	19:00	Men's 1000 metres
Day 15	Saturday, 24 February 2018	20:00	Mass start men
Day 15	Saturday, 24 February 2018	20:00	Mass start women

== Medal summary ==
=== Medal table ===
* Host nation (South Korea)

Rank	Nation	Gold	Silver	Bronze	Total
1	Netherlands	7	4	5	16
2	Japan	3	2	1	6
3	Norway	2	1	1	4
4	South Korea*	1	4	2	7
5	Canada	1	1	0	2
6	Czech Republic	0	1	1	2
7	Belgium	0	1	0	1
8	China	0	0	1	1
8	Italy	0	0	1	1
8	Olympic Athletes from Russia	0	0	1	1
8	United States	0	0	1	1
Totals (11 entries)		14	14	14	42

=== Men's events ===
Event	Gold		Silver		Bronze	
500 metres	Håvard Holmefjord Lorentzen; Norway	34.41 OR	Cha Min-kyu; South Korea	34.42	Gao Tingyu; China	34.65
1000 metres	Kjeld Nuis; Netherlands	1:07.95	Håvard Holmefjord Lorentzen; Norway	1:07.99	Kim Tae-yun; South Korea	1:08.22
1500 metres	Kjeld Nuis; Netherlands	1:44.01	Patrick Roest; Netherlands	1:44.86	Kim Min-seok; South Korea	1:44.93
5000 metres	Sven Kramer; Netherlands	6:09.76 OR	Ted-Jan Bloemen; Canada	6:11.616	Sverre Lunde Pedersen; Norway	6:11.618
10,000 metres	Ted-Jan Bloemen; Canada	12:39.77 OR	Jorrit Bergsma; Netherlands	12:41.98	Nicola Tumolero; Italy	12:54.32
Mass start	Lee Seung-hoon; South Korea	60	Bart Swings; Belgium	40	Koen Verweij; Netherlands	20
Team pursuit	Norway; Håvard Bøkko; Simen Spieler Nilsen; Sverre Lunde Pedersen; Sindre Henriksen^{[a]}	3:37.32	South Korea; Lee Seung-hoon; Chung Jae-won; Kim Min-seok	3:38.52	Netherlands; Jan Blokhuijsen; Sven Kramer; Patrick Roest; Koen Verweij^{[a]}	3:38.40

=== Women's events ===
Event	Gold		Silver		Bronze	
500 metres	Nao Kodaira; Japan	36.94 OR	Lee Sang-hwa; South Korea	37.33	Karolína Erbanová; Czech Republic	37.34
1000 metres	Jorien ter Mors; Netherlands	1:13.56 OR	Nao Kodaira; Japan	1:13.82	Miho Takagi; Japan	1:13.98
1500 metres	Ireen Wüst; Netherlands	1:54.35	Miho Takagi; Japan	1:54.55	Marrit Leenstra; Netherlands	1:55.26
3000 metres	Carlijn Achtereekte; Netherlands	3:59.21	Ireen Wüst; Netherlands	3:59.29	Antoinette de Jong; Netherlands	4:00.02
5000 metres	Esmee Visser; Netherlands	6:50.23	Martina Sáblíková; Czech Republic	6:51.85	Natalya Voronina; Olympic Athletes from Russia	6:53.98
Mass start	Nana Takagi; Japan	60	Kim Bo-reum; South Korea	40	Irene Schouten; Netherlands	20
Team pursuit	Japan; Ayano Sato; Miho Takagi; Nana Takagi; Ayaka Kikuchi^{[a]}	2:53.89 OR	Netherlands; Antoinette de Jong; Marrit Leenstra; Ireen Wüst; Lotte van Beek^{[a]}	2:55.48	United States; Heather Bergsma; Brittany Bowe; Mia Manganello; Carlijn Schoutens^{[a]}	2:59.27

^{a} Skaters who did not participate in the final of the team pursuit event, but received medals as part of the team, having taken part in an earlier round.

== Records ==
=== World & Olympic records ===
Eight Olympic records (OR) and five Sea level world bests (WB) were set during the competition.

Event	Date	Round	Athlete	Country	Time	Record	Ref
Men's 5000 metres	11 February	Pair 10	Sven Kramer	Netherlands	6:09.76	OR	
Women's 1000 metres	14 February	Pair 12	Jorien ter Mors	Netherlands	1:13.56	OR; WB (sea level)	
Men's 10,000 metres	15 February	Pair 5	Ted-Jan Bloemen	Canada	12:39.77	OR	
Women's 500 metres	18 February	Pair 14	Nao Kodaira	Japan	36.94	OR; WB (sea level)	
Women's team pursuit	19 February	Quarterfinal 1	Antoinette de Jong; Marrit Leenstra; Ireen Wüst	Netherlands	2:55.61	OR; WB (sea level)	
Men's 500 metres	19 February	Pair 16	Håvard Holmefjord Lorentzen	Norway	34.41	OR	
Men's team pursuit	21 February	Semifinal 2	Håvard Bøkko; Simen Spieler Nilsen; Sverre Lunde Pedersen	Norway	3:37.08	OR; WB (sea level)	
Women's team pursuit	21 February	Final	Ayano Sato; Miho Takagi; Nana Takagi	Japan	2:53.89	OR; WB (sea level)	

=== Other records ===
The Netherlands won the gold, silver and bronze medals in the women's 3000m event, making it a Dutch podium sweep.

== Participating nations ==
A total of 184 athletes from 29 nations (including the IOC's designation of Olympic Athletes from Russia) were scheduled to participate (the numbers of athletes are shown in parentheses). Colombia was scheduled to make its debut in the sport. A record number of nations qualified to compete in these games, with the previous high being 25 at the 1998 Winter Olympics.

- Australia (1)
- Austria (2)
- Belarus (4)
- Belgium (3)
- Canada (19)
- China (13)
- Chinese Taipei (3)
- Colombia (2)
- Czech Republic (3)
- Denmark (3)
- Estonia (2)
- Finland (3)
- France (1)
- Germany (9)
- Hungary (1)
- Italy (9)
- Japan (16)
- Kazakhstan (6)
- Latvia (1)
- Netherlands (20)
- New Zealand (3)
- Norway (9)
- Olympic Athletes from Russia (4)
- Poland (14)
- Romania (1)
- South Korea (16)
- Sweden (1)
- Switzerland (2)
- United States (13)
