= Short-track speed skating at the 2018 Winter Olympics – Women's 1000 metres =

Women’s 1000 metres at the XXIII Olympic Winter Games
- Venue: Gangneung Ice Arena; Gangneung, South Korea
- Dates: 20 February 2018 (heats); 22 February 2018 (quarterfinals, semifinals, final)
- Competitors: 32 from 15 nations
- Winning time: 1:29.778

Medalists
1st place, gold medalist(s)		Suzanne Schulting	Netherlands
2nd place, silver medalist(s)		Kim Boutin	Canada
3rd place, bronze medalist(s)		Arianna Fontana	Italy

The Women's 1000 metres in short track speed skating at the 2018 Winter Olympics took place on 20 and 22 February 2018 at the Gangneung Ice Arena in Gangneung, South Korea.

== Records ==
Prior to this competition, the existing world and Olympic records were as follows.

World record	Shim Suk-hee (KOR)	1:26.661	Calgary, Canada	21 October 2012
Olympic record	Valérie Maltais (CAN)	1:28.771	Sochi, Russia	18 February 2014

No new records were established during the competition.

== Results ==
=== Heats ===
Q – qualified for the quarterfinals
ADV – advanced
PEN – penalty
YC – yellow card

Rank	Heat	Name	Country	Time	Notes
1	1	Shim Suk-hee	South Korea	1:34.940	Q
2	1	Véronique Pierron	France	1:35.299	Q
3	1	Bianca Walter	Germany	1:36.128	ADV
	1	Han Yutong	China		PEN
1	2	Choi Min-jeong	South Korea	1:31.190	Q
2	2	Qu Chunyu	China	1:31.279	Q
3	2	Anastassiya Krestova	Kazakhstan	1:31.557	
	2	Deanna Lockett	Australia		PEN
1	3	Suzanne Schulting	Netherlands	1:29.519	Q
2	3	Ekaterina Efremenkova	Olympic Athletes from Russia	1:29.598	Q
3	3	Kim Iong-a	Kazakhstan	1:29.703	
4	3	Petra Jászapáti	Hungary	1:29.838	
1	4	Arianna Fontana	Italy	1:30.676	Q
2	4	Valérie Maltais	Canada	1:30.773	Q
3	4	Jessica Kooreman	United States	1:31.657	
4	4	Kathryn Thomson	Great Britain	1:32.150	
1	5	Lara van Ruijven	Netherlands	1:30.896	Q
2	5	Magdalena Warakomska	Poland	1:31.259	Q
3	5	Andrea Keszler	Hungary	1:31.446	ADV
	5	Elise Christie	Great Britain		YC
1	6	Li Jinyu	China	1:32.335	Q
2	6	Yara van Kerkhof	Netherlands	1:43.364	Q
	6	Sofia Prosvirnova	Olympic Athletes from Russia		PEN
	6	Anna Seidel	Germany		PEN
1	7	Kim A-lang	South Korea	1:30.459	Q
2	7	Marianne St-Gelais	Canada	1:30.512	Q
3	7	Sumire Kikuchi	Japan	1:30.970	
	7	Lana Gehring	United States		PEN
1	8	Kim Boutin	Canada	1:32.402	Q
2	8	Hitomi Saito	Japan	1:32.457	Q
3	8	Charlotte Gilmartin	Great Britain	1:32.899	
4	8	Cynthia Mascitto	Italy	1:32.926	

=== Quarterfinals ===
Q – qualified for Semifinals

Rank	Heat	Name	Country	Time	Notes
1	1	Kim Boutin	Canada	1:30.013	Q
2	1	Kim A-lang	South Korea	1:30.137	Q
3	1	Marianne St-Gelais	Canada	1:30.180	
4	1	Véronique Pierron	France	1:30.323	
5	1	Bianca Walter	Germany	1:31.085	
1	2	Arianna Fontana	Italy	1:30.074	Q
2	2	Valérie Maltais	Canada	1:30.131	Q
3	2	Li Jinyu	China	1:30.175	
4	2	Hitomi Saito	Japan	1:30.804	
1	3	Choi Min-jeong	South Korea	1:30.940	Q
2	3	Qu Chunyu	China	1:31.284	Q
3	3	Magdalena Warakomska	Poland	1:31.698	
4	3	Lara van Ruijven	Netherlands	1:31.754	
1	4	Shim Suk-hee	South Korea	1:29.159	Q
2	4	Suzanne Schulting	Netherlands	1:29.377	Q
3	4	Ekaterina Efremenkova	Olympic Athletes from Russia	1:29.466	
4	4	Yara van Kerkhof	Netherlands	1:29.670	
5	4	Andrea Keszler	Hungary	1:30.642	

=== Semifinals ===
QA – qualified for Final A
QB – qualified for Final B
ADV – advanced
PEN – penalty

Rank	Heat	Name	Country	Time	Notes
1	1	Kim Boutin	Canada	1:29.065	QA
2	1	Arianna Fontana	Italy	1:29.156	QA
3	1	Kim A-lang	South Korea	1:29.212	QB
	1	Valérie Maltais	Canada		PEN
1	2	Suzanne Schulting	Netherlands	1:30.949	QA
2	2	Shim Suk-hee	South Korea	1:30.974	QA
3	2	Choi Min-jeong	South Korea	1:31.131	ADV
	2	Qu Chunyu	China		PEN

=== Final ===
Final B was scratched as Kim A-lang (5th overall) was the only athlete who qualified for it. The final was held on 22 February 2018 at 20:29.

Rank	Name	Country	Time	Notes
1st place, gold medalist(s)	Suzanne Schulting	Netherlands	1:29.778	
2nd place, silver medalist(s)	Kim Boutin	Canada	1:29.956	
3rd place, bronze medalist(s)	Arianna Fontana	Italy	1:30.656	
4	Choi Min-jeong	South Korea	1:42.434	
6	Shim Suk-hee	South Korea		PEN
