= Speed skating at the 2018 Winter Olympics – Men's mass start =

Men's mass start at the XXIII Olympic Winter Games
- Venue: Gangneung Oval, Gangneung, South Korea
- Date: 24 February 2018
- Competitors: 24 from 18 nations
- Winning points: 60

Medalists
1st place, gold medalist(s)		Lee Seung-hoon	South Korea
2nd place, silver medalist(s)		Bart Swings	Belgium
3rd place, bronze medalist(s)		Koen Verweij	Netherlands

The men's mass start speed skating competition of the 2018 Winter Olympics was held on 24 February 2018 at Gangneung Oval in Gangneung This was the first time the mass start has been introduced to the Olympics. The competition was held as a points race.

== Format ==
There were 12 skaters in each semifinal. The eight best finishers from each of two semi-finals competed in the final. Each race consisted of 16 laps. Three leaders after last 16th lap received 60, 40 and 20 points respectively. Three intermediate sprints award points to the first three competitors (5 points, 3 points, 1 point) after 4th, 8th and 12th laps. Event rankings were based on points gained in sprints, then by finish time for athletes with equal points. In the Gangneung Oval, the accurate distance of 16 laps of the warm-up lane, is 5,695.175 m (355.948 m each lap).

== Results ==
All races were skated on the same day, 24 February 2018. The first semifinal was held at 20:45, the second at 21:00. The final was on the same day at 22:00.

=== Semifinals ===
Rank	Semifinal	Name	Country	Points	Time	Notes
1	1	Linus Heidegger	Austria	60	8:20.46	Q
2	1	Andrea Giovannini	Italy	41	8:24.41	Q
3	1	Shane Williamson	Japan	20	8:25.44	Q
4	1	Viktor Hald Thorup	Denmark	5	8:34.06	Q
5	1	Koen Verweij	Netherlands	5	8:44.90	Q
6	1	Lee Seung-hoon	South Korea	5	8:45.37	Q
7	1	Olivier Jean	Canada	4	8:42.31	Q
8	1	Alexis Contin	France	3	8:28.70	Q
9	1	Haralds Silovs	Latvia	3	8:28.93	
10	1	Brian Hansen	United States	1	8:34.47	
11	1	Fyodor Mezentsev	Kazakhstan	0	8:43.26	
12	1	Reyon Kay	New Zealand	0	9:17.99	
1	2	Peter Michael	New Zealand	60	7:55.10	Q
2	2	Stefan Due Schmidt	Denmark	40	7:55.22	Q
3	2	Vitali Mikhailau	Belarus	20	7:55.25	Q
4	2	Sven Kramer	Netherlands	6	8:24.51	Q
5	2	Bart Swings	Belgium	5	8:13.57	Q
6	2	Chung Jae-won	South Korea	5	8:17.02	Q
7	2	Livio Wenger	Switzerland	5	8:17.17	Q
8	2	Joey Mantia	United States	3	8:00.54	Q
9	2	Sverre Lunde Pedersen	Norway	2	7:58.65	
10	2	Konrad Niedźwiedzki	Poland	1	8:24.73	
11	2	Ryosuke Tsuchiya	Japan	0	7:55.77	
12	2	Wang Hongli	China	0	8:00.97	

=== Final ===
Rank	Name	Country	Points	Time	Notes
1st place, gold medalist(s)	Lee Seung-hoon	South Korea	60	7:43.97	
2nd place, silver medalist(s)	Bart Swings	Belgium	40	7:44.08	
3rd place, bronze medalist(s)	Koen Verweij	Netherlands	20	7:44.24	
4	Livio Wenger	Switzerland	11	8:13.08	
5	Viktor Hald Thorup	Denmark	8	7:57.10	
6	Linus Heidegger	Austria	6	7:52.38	
7	Vitali Mikhailau	Belarus	1	7:53.38	
8	Chung Jae-won	South Korea	1	8:32.71	
9	Joey Mantia	United States	0	7:45.21	
10	Alexis Contin	France	0	7:45.64	
11	Shane Williamson	Japan	0	7:46.19	
12	Andrea Giovannini	Italy	0	7:46.83	
13	Stefan Due Schmidt	Denmark	0	7:47.53	
14	Olivier Jean	Canada	0	7:49.30	
15	Peter Michael	New Zealand	0	7:49.33	
16	Sven Kramer	Netherlands	0	8:13.95	
