= Speed skating at the 2018 Winter Olympics – Men's 10,000 metres =

Men's 10,000 metres at the XXIII Olympic Winter Games
- Venue: Gangneung Oval
- Date: 15 February 2018
- Competitors: 12 from 8 nations
- Winning time: 12:39.77

Medalists
1st place, gold medalist(s)		Ted-Jan Bloemen	Canada
2nd place, silver medalist(s)		Jorrit Bergsma	Netherlands
3rd place, bronze medalist(s)		Nicola Tumolero	Italy

The men's 10,000 metres speed skating competition of the 2018 Winter Olympics was held on 15 February 2018 at Gangneung Oval in Gangneung, South Korea.

== Summary ==
The event was won by Ted-Jan Bloemen, the world record holder at this distance. Defending champion Jorrit Bergsma was second, and Nicola Tumolero won the bronze medal. During the competition, first Bergsma and then Bloemen set Olympic records. This was the first skating event at the 2018 Olympics not won by a Dutch skater. For Tumolero, this was his first Olympic medal; for Bloemen the gold followed his silver medal at the 5000 m distance a few days earlier.

In the victory ceremony, the medals were presented by Ivan Dibos, member of the International Olympic Committee, accompanied by Nick Thometz, ISU Speed Skating Technical Committee member.

== Records ==
Prior to this competition, the existing world, Olympic and track records were as follows.

World record	Ted-Jan Bloemen (CAN)	12:36.30	Salt Lake City, United States	21 November 2015
Olympic record	Jorrit Bergsma (NED)	12:44.45	Sochi, Russia	18 February 2014
Track record	Sven Kramer (NED)	12:38.89		11 February 2017

The following record was set during this competition.

Date	Round	Athlete	Country	Time	Record
15 February	Pair 5	Ted-Jan Bloemen	Canada	12:39.77	OR

OR = Olympic record

== Results ==
The race was held at 20:00, local time (UTC+9).

Rank	Pair	Lane	Name	Country	Time	Time behind	Notes
1st place, gold medalist(s)	5	O	Ted-Jan Bloemen	Canada	12:39.77	—	OR
2nd place, silver medalist(s)	4	I	Jorrit Bergsma	Netherlands	12:41.98	+2.21	
3rd place, bronze medalist(s)	5	I	Nicola Tumolero	Italy	12:54.32	+14.55	
4	3	O	Lee Seung-hoon	South Korea	12:55.54	+15.77	
5	2	O	Jordan Belchos	Canada	12:59.51	+19.74	
6	6	O	Sven Kramer	Netherlands	13:01.02	+21.25	
7	6	I	Patrick Beckert	Germany	13:01.94	+22.17	
8	1	O	Bart Swings	Belgium	13:03.53	+23.76	
9	3	I	Moritz Geisreiter	Germany	13:06.35	+26.58	
10	1	I	Ryosuke Tsuchiya	Japan	13:10.31	+30.54	
11	2	I	Håvard Bøkko	Norway	13:17.47	+37.70	
12	4	O	Davide Ghiotto	Italy	13:27.09	+47.32	
