= Speed skating at the 2018 Winter Olympics – Women's 1000 metres =

Women's 1000 metres at the XXIII Olympic Winter Games
- Venue: Gangneung Oval
- Date: 14 February 2018
- Competitors: 31 from 15 nations
- Winning time: 1:13.56 OR

Medalists
1st place, gold medalist(s)		Jorien ter Mors	Netherlands
2nd place, silver medalist(s)		Nao Kodaira	Japan
3rd place, bronze medalist(s)		Miho Takagi	Japan

The women's 1000 metres speed skating competition of the 2018 Winter Olympics was held at Gangneung Oval in Gangneung on 14 February 2018.

== Summary ==
Jorien ter Mors became the Olympic champion, continuing the trend that all 2018 Olympic gold medals in speed skating up to this event were won by Dutch skaters. Nao Kodaira became second, and Miho Takagi was third, two days after her silver medal in the 1500m event.

The defending champion was Zhang Hong, and the 2014 silver medalist, Ireen Wüst, was also competing. Wüst took an early lead in 4th pair, and stayed on top until in 12th pair Jorien ter Mors skated an olympic record, and the time of Brittany Bowe in the same pair was still better than that of Wüst. In 14th pair, Miho Takagi posted the time between these of ter Mors and Bowe, shifting Bowe to the bronze medal position. In 15th pair Nao Kodaira, the world record holder at this distance, had a time behind than of ten Mors but below the former Olympic record of Chris Witty, shifting Takagi to the bronze medal position. There was one pair to go, but Marrit Leenstra only finished sixth, not changing the order of medals.

== Records ==
Prior to this competition, the existing world and Olympic records were as follows.

World record	Nao Kodaira (JPN)	1:12.09	Salt Lake City, United States	10 December 2017
Olympic record	Chris Witty (USA)	1:13.83	Salt Lake City, United States	17 February 2002
Track record	Heather Bergsma (USA)	1:13.94		11 February 2017

The following records were set during this competition.

Date	Round	Athlete	Country	Time	Record
14 February	Pair 12	Jorien ter Mors	Netherlands	1:13.56	OR; WB (sea level), TR

OR = Olympic record, TR = track record

== Results ==
The competition started at 19:00.

Rank	Pair	Lane	Name	Country	Time	Time behind	Notes
1st place, gold medalist(s)	12	I	Jorien ter Mors	Netherlands	1:13.56	—	OR, TR
2nd place, silver medalist(s)	15	O	Nao Kodaira	Japan	1:13.82	+0.26	
3rd place, bronze medalist(s)	14	I	Miho Takagi	Japan	1:13.98	+0.42	
4	12	O	Brittany Bowe	United States	1:14.36	+0.80	
5	15	I	Vanessa Herzog	Austria	1:14.47	+0.91	
6	16	I	Marrit Leenstra	Netherlands	1:14.85	+1.29	
7	14	O	Karolína Erbanová	Czech Republic	1:14.95	+1.39	
8	16	O	Heather Bergsma	United States	1:15.15	+1.59	
9	4	I	Ireen Wüst	Netherlands	1:15.32	+1.76	
10	7	O	Ida Njåtun	Norway	1:15.43	+1.87	
11	11	O	Zhang Hong	China	1:15.67	+2.11	
12	11	I	Natalia Czerwonka	Poland	1:15.77	+2.21	
13	10	I	Arisa Go	Japan	1:15.84	+2.28	
14	13	I	Hege Bøkko	Norway	1:15.98	+2.42	
15	9	I	Gabriele Hirschbichler	Germany	1:16.03	+2.47	
16	9	O	Park Seung-hi	South Korea	1:16.11	+2.55	
17	5	I	Yu Jing	China	1:16.361	+2.80	
18	7	I	Kim Hyun-yung	South Korea	1:16.366	+2.80	
19	2	O	Nikola Zdráhalová	Czech Republic	1:16.43	+2.87	
20	13	O	Huang Yu-ting	Chinese Taipei	1:16.44	+2.88	
21	6	I	Tian Ruining	China	1:16.69	+3.13	
22	8	O	Angelina Golikova	Olympic Athletes from Russia	1:16.85	+3.29	
23	8	I	Kaylin Irvine	Canada	1:16.90	+3.34	
24	6	O	Yekaterina Aydova	Kazakhstan	1:17.09	+3.53	
25	10	O	Heather McLean	Canada	1:17.25	+3.69	
26	5	O	Judith Dannhauer	Germany	1:17.41	+3.85	
27	3	O	Francesca Bettrone	Italy	1:17.83	+4.27	
28	3	I	Jerica Tandiman	United States	1:18.02	+4.46	
29	2	I	Karolina Bosiek	Poland	1:18.53	+4.97	
30	4	O	Yvonne Daldossi	Italy	1:19.33	+5.77	
31	1	I	Michelle Uhrig	Germany	1:20.81	+7.25	
