= Netherlands at the 2018 Winter Olympics =

- Flag of the Netherlands
- IOC code: NED
- NOC: Dutch Olympic Committee*; Dutch Sports Federation
- Website: www.nocnsf.nl/en

in Pyeongchang, South Korea 9–25 February 2018
- Competitors: 33 (16 men and 17 women) in 4 sports
- Flag bearer (opening): Jan Smeekens (speed skating)
- Flag bearer (closing): Ireen Wüst (speed skating)
- Medals Ranked 5th: Gold 8 Silver 6 Bronze 6 Total 20

Winter Olympics appearances (overview)
- 1928; 1932; 1936; 1948; 1952; 1956; 1960; 1964; 1968; 1972; 1976; 1980; 1984; 1988; 1992; 1994; 1998; 2002; 2006; 2010; 2014; 2018; 2022; 2026

The Netherlands competed at the 2018 Winter Olympics in Pyeongchang, South Korea, between 9 and 25 February 2018. Speed skater Jan Smeekens was appointed as flag bearer for the opening ceremony, which was attended by King Willem Alexander, Queen Máxima and Prime Minister Mark Rutte, who also observed the sporting events that featured Dutch competitors.

The goal for the Dutch team was to win fifteen medals, as declared by Chef de mission Jeroen Bijl; they exceeded this goal by five medals, with a total of twenty, which placed the Netherlands fifth in the medal table. Most notably, the Dutch team dominated the individual speed skating events, winning seven of the ten gold medals awarded; they also won four medals in short track speed skating including their first ever gold medal in this discipline, won by Suzanne Schulting.

== Highlights ==
=== Day 1 ===
Netherlands completed a podium sweep in the women's 3000 metres speed skating event – Carlijn Achtereekte won gold, Ireen Wüst won silver and Antoinette de Jong won bronze. A few minutes after the podium sweep, Sjinkie Knegt won the silver medal in the men's 1500 metres short track speed skating event.

=== Day 2 ===
Sven Kramer won the gold medal in the men's 5000 metres speed skating event. Kramer became the first man ever to win a gold medal in the same speed skating event at three consecutive Winter Olympics.

=== Day 3 ===
Netherlands took three of the top four places in the women's 1500 metres speed skating event; Ireen Wüst won the gold medal and Marrit Leenstra took bronze, only 0.01 seconds ahead of Lotte van Beek. On winning the gold medal, Wüst had succeeded in achieving gold medal wins at four consecutive Winter Olympics, exactly twelve years after winning her first gold medal in the 3000 metres in 2006. With a total of ten medals, including five golds, Wüst became the best ever Olympic speed skater (male or female) and the seventh-best Winter Olympic athlete overall.

=== Day 4 ===
Olympic debutant Kjeld Nuis won the gold medal in the men's 1500 metres speed skating event. Patrick Roest, also an Olympic debutant, won the silver medal. Koen Verweij, one of the favorites for the win, finished in eleventh place. In short track speed skating, Yara van Kerkhof unexpectedly won the silver medal in the women's 500 metres event, benefiting from the disqualification of the Korean Choi Min-jeong after initially finishing in third.

== Medalists ==
Medal	Name	Sport	Event	Date
Gold	Carlijn Achtereekte	Speed skating	Women's 3000 metres	10 February
Gold	Sven Kramer	Speed skating	Men's 5000 metres	11 February
Gold	Ireen Wüst	Speed skating	Women's 1500 metres	12 February
Gold	Kjeld Nuis	Speed skating	Men's 1500 metres	13 February
Gold	Jorien ter Mors	Speed skating	Women's 1000 metres	14 February
Gold	Esmee Visser	Speed skating	Women's 5000 metres	16 February
Gold	Kjeld Nuis	Speed skating	Men's 1000 metres	23 February
Gold	Suzanne Schulting	Short track speed skating	Women's 1000 metres	22 February
Silver	Ireen Wüst	Speed skating	Women's 3000 metres	10 February
Silver	Patrick Roest	Speed skating	Men's 1500 metres	13 February
Silver	Jorrit Bergsma	Speed skating	Men's 10,000 metres	15 February
Silver	Antoinette de Jong; Marrit Leenstra; Ireen Wüst; Lotte van Beek	Speed skating	Women's team pursuit	21 February
Silver	Sjinkie Knegt	Short track speed skating	Men's 1500 metres	10 February
Silver	Yara van Kerkhof	Short track speed skating	Women's 500 metres	13 February
Bronze	Antoinette de Jong	Speed skating	Women's 3000 metres	10 February
Bronze	Marrit Leenstra	Speed skating	Women's 1500 metres	12 February
Bronze	Jan Blokhuijsen; Sven Kramer; Koen Verweij; Patrick Roest	Speed skating	Men's team pursuit	21 February
Bronze	Irene Schouten	Speed skating	Women's mass start	24 February
Bronze	Koen Verweij	Speed skating	Men's mass start	24 February
Bronze	Yara van Kerkhof; Jorien ter Mors; Lara van Ruijven; Suzanne Schulting	Short track speed skating	Women's 3000 metre relay	20 February

Medals by sport
Sport	1st place, gold medalist(s)	2nd place, silver medalist(s)	3rd place, bronze medalist(s)	Total
Speed skating	7	4	5	16
Short track speed skating	1	2	1	4
Total	8	6	6	20

Medals by date
Day	Date	1st place, gold medalist(s)	2nd place, silver medalist(s)	3rd place, bronze medalist(s)	Total
Day 1	10 February	1	2	1	4
Day 2	11 February	1	0	0	1
Day 3	12 February	1	0	1	2
Day 4	13 February	1	2	0	3
Day 5	14 February	1	0	0	1
Day 6	15 February	0	1	0	1
Day 7	16 February	1	0	0	1
Day 8	17 February	0	0	0	0
Day 9	18 February	0	0	0	0
Day 10	19 February	0	0	0	0
Day 11	20 February	0	0	1	1
Day 12	21 February	0	1	1	2
Day 13	22 February	1	0	0	1
Day 14	23 February	1	0	0	1
Day 15	24 February	0	0	2	2
Day 16	25 February	0	0	0	0
Total		8	6	6	20

== Competitors ==
The following is the list of number of competitors participating at the Games per sport/discipline.

Sport	Men	Women	Total
Short track speed skating	5	5	10
Skeleton	0	1	1
Snowboarding	1^{[a]}	2	3
Speed skating	10	10	20
Total	16	17^{[b]}	33^{[b]}

^{a} Niek van der Velden was the only male snowboarder on the team, but did not compete due to a broken shoulder.
^{b} Jorien ter Mors competed in both short track and long track speed skating (hence the totals appear to be one short).

== Short track speed skating ==
According to the ISU Special Olympic Qualification Rankings, the Netherlands have qualified a full squad of five men and five women each.

Athlete	Event	Heat		Quarterfinal		Semifinal		Final	
Athlete	Event	Time	Rank	Time	Rank	Time	Rank	Time	Rank
Daan Breeuwsma	500 m	40.806	2 Q	40.677	2 Q	40.775	4 FB	40.835	7
Daan Breeuwsma	1000 m	1:24.429	4	Did not advance					
Dylan Hoogerwerf	500 m	40.657	2 Q	41.007	3	Did not advance			
Sjinkie Knegt	500 m	PEN		Did not advance					
Sjinkie Knegt	1000 m	1:23.823	1 Q	PEN		Did not advance			
Sjinkie Knegt	1500 m	2:15.949	3 Q	—N/a		2:11.900	1 FA	2:10.555	2nd place, silver medalist(s)
Itzhak de Laat	1000 m	1:24.639	1 Q	1:24.423	3	Did not advance			
Itzhak de Laat	1500 m	2:15.691	2 Q	—N/a		2:11.781	3 AA	2:12.362	6
Daan Breeuwsma; Sjinkie Knegt; Itzhak de Laat; Dennis Visser ^{[c]}	5000 m relay	—N/a				PEN		Did not advance	

^{c} Dylan Hoogerwerf was also part of the relay team, but did not compete.

Women

Athlete	Event	Heat		Quarterfinal		Semifinal		Final	
Athlete	Event	Time	Rank	Time	Rank	Time	Rank	Time	Rank
Yara van Kerkhof	500 m	43.430	2 Q	43.197	2 Q	43.192	1 FA	43.256	2nd place, silver medalist(s)
Yara van Kerkhof	1000 m	1:43.364	2 Q	1:29.670	4	Did not advance			
Jorien ter Mors	1500 m	2:28.587	2 Q	—N/a		2:34.385	1 FA	2:25.955	5
Lara van Ruijven	500 m	43.771	3	Did not advance					
Lara van Ruijven	1000 m	1:30.896	1 Q	1:31.754	4	Did not advance			
Suzanne Schulting	500 m	DNF		Did not advance					
Suzanne Schulting	1000 m	1:29.519	1 Q	1:29.377	2 Q	1:30.949	1 FA	1:29.778	1st place, gold medalist(s)
Suzanne Schulting	1500 m	2:27.730	1 Q	—N/a		2:34.632	4 FB	2:37.163	10
Yara van Kerkhof; Jorien ter Mors; Lara van Ruijven; Suzanne Schulting ^{[d]}	3000 m relay	—N/a				4:05.977	3 FB	4:03.471 WR	3rd place, bronze medalist(s)

^{d} Rianne de Vries was also part of the relay team, but did not compete.

Key: AA = Advanced to medal round due to being impeded by another skater; DNF = Did not finish; FA = Qualified to medal round; FB = Qualified to consolation round; PEN = Penalty; Q = Qualified to next round; WR = World record

== Skeleton ==
Based on the world rankings, the Netherlands qualified two sleds. However, they elected to nominate only one athlete, Kimberley Bos, who was the first Dutch skeleton athlete ever to qualify for the Olympics. Although Bos met the international qualification criteria by virtue of her performance during the World Cup skeleton 2017–18, in which she finished in 13th place overall, she was not initially selected because she did not meet the NOC*NSF's own requirement (a top-12 place). However, NOC*NSF argued that Russian athlete Jelena Nikitina should be eliminated from the World Cup classification, as she had been excluded by the IOC from participating in the Olympics. When this was agreed, Bos rose to 12th place on the clean list for the World Cup classification, thereby fulfilling the NOC*NSF requirement, and her nomination was secured.

Athlete	Event	Run 1		Run 2		Run 3		Run 4		Total	
Athlete	Event	Time	Rank	Time	Rank	Time	Rank	Time	Rank	Time	Rank
Kimberley Bos	Women's	52.33	8	52.26	7	51.99	6	52.01	7	3:28.59	8

== Snowboarding ==
Niek van der Velden was unable to compete because of a broken shoulder caused by a crash in the final training for the slopestyle.

Cheryl Maas fell in both runs of the women's slopestyle, so she did not play an important role in the final. Strong winds during the final caused many of the athletes to fall; Maas called the conditions "irresponsible".

Freestyle

Athlete	Event	Qualification				Final				
Athlete	Event	Run 1	Run 2	Best	Rank	Run 1	Run 2	Run 3	Best	Rank
Niek van der Velden	Men's slopestyle	Withdrew due to injury								
Niek van der Velden	Men's big air	Withdrew due to injury								
Cheryl Maas	Women's slopestyle	CAN				31.71	35.30	CAN	35.30	23
Cheryl Maas	Women's big air	65.00	44.75	65.00	20	did not advance				

Parallel

Athlete	Event	Qualification		Round of 16	Quarterfinal	Semifinal	Final / BM	
Athlete	Event	Time	Rank	Opposition Time	Opposition Time	Opposition Time	Opposition Time	Rank
Michelle Dekker	Women's giant slalom	1:33.60	17	Did not advance				

== Speed skating ==
The Dutch Olympic Committee selected the maximum allowed delegation of ten men and ten women, largely based on the results of the Olympic qualification tournament, held in December 2017. Kai Verbij was added for the 1000 metre event, because he was injured during the qualification race.

Men

Athlete	Event	Race	
Athlete	Event	Time	Rank
Jorrit Bergsma	10000 m	12:41.98	2nd place, silver medalist(s)
Jan Blokhuijsen	5000 m	6:14.75	7
Sven Kramer	5000 m	6:09.76 OR	1st place, gold medalist(s)
Sven Kramer	10000 m	13:01.02	6
Ronald Mulder	500 m	34.839	7
Kjeld Nuis	1000 m	1:07.95	1st place, gold medalist(s)
Kjeld Nuis	1500 m	1:44.01	1st place, gold medalist(s)
Patrick Roest	1500 m	1:44.86	2nd place, silver medalist(s)
Jan Smeekens	500 m	34.930	10
Kai Verbij	500 m	34.90	9
Kai Verbij	1000 m	1:08.61	6
Koen Verweij	1000 m	1:09.14	9
Koen Verweij	1500 m	1:46.26	11
Bob de Vries	5000 m	6:22.26	15

Women

Athlete	Event	Race	
Athlete	Event	Time	Rank
Carlijn Achtereekte	3000 m	3:59.21	1st place, gold medalist(s)
Lotte van Beek	1500 m	1:55.27	4
Lotte van Beek	500 m	39.18	23
Anice Das	500 m	38.75	19
Antoinette de Jong	3000 m	4:00.02	3rd place, bronze medalist(s)
Marrit Leenstra	1000 m	1:14.85	6
Marrit Leenstra	1500 m	1:55.26	3rd place, bronze medalist(s)
Jorien ter Mors	500 m	37.539	6
Jorien ter Mors	1000 m	1:13.56 OR	1st place, gold medalist(s)
Esmee Visser	5000 m	6:50.23	1st place, gold medalist(s)
Annouk van der Weijden	5000 m	6:54.17	4
Ireen Wüst	1000 m	1:15.32	9
Ireen Wüst	1500 m	1:54.35	1st place, gold medalist(s)
Ireen Wüst	3000 m	3:59.29	2nd place, silver medalist(s)

Mass start

Athlete	Event	Semifinal			Final		
Athlete	Event	Points	Time	Rank	Points	Time	Rank
Sven Kramer	Men's mass start	6	8:24.51	4 Q	0	8:13.95	16
Koen Verweij	Men's mass start	5	8:44.90	5 Q	20	7:44.24	3rd place, bronze medalist(s)
Irene Schouten	Women's mass start	5	8:54.94	4 Q	20	8:33.02	3rd place, bronze medalist(s)
Annouk van der Weijden	Women's mass start	40	8:32.31	2 Q	0	8:42.19	14

Team pursuit

Athlete	Event	Quarterfinal		Semifinal		Final	
Athlete	Event	Opposition Time	Rank	Opposition Time	Rank	Opposition Time	Rank
Jan Blokhuijsen; Sven Kramer; Koen Verweij; Patrick Roest	Men's team pursuit	United States; W 3:40.03	2 Q	Norway; L 3:38.46	2 FB	New Zealand; W 3:38.40	3rd place, bronze medalist(s)
Antoinette de Jong; Marrit Leenstra; Ireen Wüst; Lotte van Beek	Women's team pursuit	South Korea; W 2:55.61 OR	1 Q	United States; W 3:00.41	1 FA	Japan; L 2:55.48	2nd place, silver medalist(s)

Key: FA = Qualified to gold medal round; FB = Qualified to bronze medal round; L = Lost; OR = Olympic record; Q = Qualified to next round; W = Won
