= Jeroen Bijl =

Dutch volleyball player (born 1966)

Jeroen Bijl (born 5 September 1966 in Rotterdam) is a Dutch former volleyball player who played for the Netherlands men's national volleyball team and Piet Zoomers Dynamo.

Bijl played a total of 57 international matches with the Dutch national team. With his club Piet Zoomers Dynamo he became five times national champion and three times the national cup winner.

After his sport career he became president of PEC Zwolle and was chef de mission for the Dutch team at the 2018 Winter Olympics.

== Volleyball career ==
Bijl played volleyball with Piet Zoomers Dynamo in Apeldoorn. He became in 1991 the main setter of the team after Wim Jonker became injured. In late 1991 he couldn't play due to an ankle injury.

He was a member of the Netherlands men's national volleyball team that won the silver medal at the 1993 Men's European Volleyball Championship, where he was stand-in for main player Peter Blangé. In 1994 he left the Netherlands men's national volleyball team for his social career, as he was able to became manager of FC Zwolle. However he was able to combine the job and returend in February 1995. However soon afterwards the team had problems due to his absence as he suffered a strain injury until May.

During his career he lived in a room with volleyball team mate and friend Bas van de Goor.

== Professional career ==
Bijl studied public administration. Next to playing volleyball with Dynamo he became manager of football team FC Zwolle from June 1994, via his job with Rijnconsult in Oosterbeek. He became later president of the club, and worked with FC Zwolle for nine years.

He became the head coach of Piet Zoomers Dynamo from 2003. From May 2005 he became the head of Dutch elite sports development with NOC*NSF at Papendal. He afterwards became chef de mission of NOC*NSF and was within this function the main person responsible for the Dutch team at the 2018 Winter Olympics.

== Honors ==
For his works within Volleyball he received the gold pin of the Vereniging Topvolleybal (VTV).
