= Speed skating at the 2018 Winter Olympics – Women's 3000 metres =

Women's 3000 metres at the XXIII Olympic Winter Games
- Venue: Gangneung Oval, Gangneung, South Korea
- Date: 10 February 2018
- Competitors: 24 from 13 nations
- Winning time: 3:59.21

Medalists
1st place, gold medalist(s)		Carlijn Achtereekte	Netherlands
2nd place, silver medalist(s)		Ireen Wüst	Netherlands
3rd place, bronze medalist(s)		Antoinette de Jong	Netherlands

The women's 3000 metres speed skating competition of the 2018 Winter Olympics was held at Gangneung Oval in Gangneung on 10 February 2018.

== Summary ==
Competitors included reigning 2014 champion Ireen Wüst (also the 2006 gold medallist), 2010 champion Martina Sáblíková (also the 2014 silver medallist), and 2002 victor Claudia Pechstein. The 2014 bronze medallist Olga Graf qualified for the event but decided not to compete.

Skating in the 5th pair, Carlijn Achtereekte posted the then-fastest time and remained in the gold medal position throughout the event. In the 9th pair Ireen Wüst held a lead over Achtereekte's time for most of her race, but ultimately finished 0.08 seconds behind to take second place. In the 11th pair Antoinette de Jong posted the third fastest time, and in the final pair Martina Sáblíková came up half a second short of the bronze medal position, finishing fourth. There was a podium sweep for the Netherlands.

In the victory ceremony, the medals were presented by Mamadou Diagna Ndiaye, member of the International Olympic Committee; accompanied by Sergio Anesi, ISU council member.

== Records ==
Prior to this competition, the existing world, Olympic and track records were as follows.

World record	Cindy Klassen (CAN)	3:53.34	Calgary, Canada	18 March 2006
Olympic record	Claudia Pechstein (GER)	3:57.70	Salt Lake City, United States	20 February 2002
Track record	Ireen Wüst (NED)	3:59.05		9 February 2017

No new records were set during the competition.

== Results ==
The races were started at 20:00.

Rank	Pair	Lane	Name	Country	Time	Time behind	Notes
1st place, gold medalist(s)	5	I	Carlijn Achtereekte	Netherlands	3:59.21	—	
2nd place, silver medalist(s)	9	I	Ireen Wüst	Netherlands	3:59.29	+0.08	
3rd place, bronze medalist(s)	11	O	Antoinette de Jong	Netherlands	4:00.02	+0.81	
4	12	O	Martina Sáblíková	Czech Republic	4:00.54	+1.33	
5	11	I	Miho Takagi	Japan	4:01.35	+2.14	
6	10	I	Ivanie Blondin	Canada	4:04.14	+4.93	
7	9	O	Isabelle Weidemann	Canada	4:04.26	+5.05	
8	3	O	Ayano Sato	Japan	4:04.35	+5.14	
9	10	O	Claudia Pechstein	Germany	4:04.49	+5.28	
10	12	I	Natalya Voronina	Olympic Athletes from Russia	4:05.85	+6.64	
11	8	O	Maryna Zuyeva	Belarus	4:05.96	+6.75	
12	1	I	Ida Njåtun	Norway	4:06.67	+7.46	
13	6	I	Francesca Lollobrigida	Italy	4:08.58	+9.37	
14	3	I	Luiza Złotkowska	Poland	4:09.69	+10.48	
15	2	O	Nikola Zdráhalová	Czech Republic	4:11.36	+12.15	
16	5	O	Karolina Bosiek	Poland	4:12.44	+13.23	
17	4	O	Katarzyna Bachleda-Curuś	Poland	4:12.57	+13.36	
18	1	O	Kim Bo-reum	South Korea	4:12.79	+13.58	
19	8	I	Ayaka Kikuchi	Japan	4:13.25	+14.04	
20	7	O	Brianne Tutt	Canada	4:13.70	+14.49	
21	6	O	Hao Jiachen	China	4:15.56	+16.35	
22	7	I	Carlijn Schoutens	United States	4:15.60	+16.39	
23	4	I	Roxanne Dufter	Germany	4:16.87	+17.66	
24	2	I	Liu Jing	China	4:20.95	+21.74	
