= Poland at the 2018 Winter Olympics =

- Flag of Poland
- IOC code: POL
- NOC: Polish Olympic Committee
- Website: www.olimpijski.pl (in Polish)

in Pyeongchang, South Korea 9–25 February 2018
- Competitors: 62 (36 men and 26 women) in 12 sports
- Flag bearer: Zbigniew Bródka
- Medals Ranked 20th: Gold 1 Silver 0 Bronze 1 Total 2

Winter Olympics appearances (overview)
- 1924; 1928; 1932; 1936; 1948; 1952; 1956; 1960; 1964; 1968; 1972; 1976; 1980; 1984; 1988; 1992; 1994; 1998; 2002; 2006; 2010; 2014; 2018; 2022; 2026

Poland competed at the 2018 Winter Olympics in Pyeongchang, South Korea, from 9 to 25 February 2018. It was the nation's 23rd appearance at the Winter Olympics, having competed at every Games since their inception in 1924. The Polish team consisted of 62 athletes in 12 sports, which was the largest ever Polish team, surpassing the 59 athletes that competed in 2014. Polish ski jumpers won one gold and one bronze medal, earning the 20th place at the medal table.

== Medalists ==
Medal	Name	Sport	Event	Date
Gold	Kamil Stoch	Ski jumping	Men's large hill individual	17 February
Bronze	Maciej Kot; Stefan Hula Jr. Dawid Kubacki; Kamil Stoch	Ski jumping	Men's large hill team	19 February

== Competitors ==
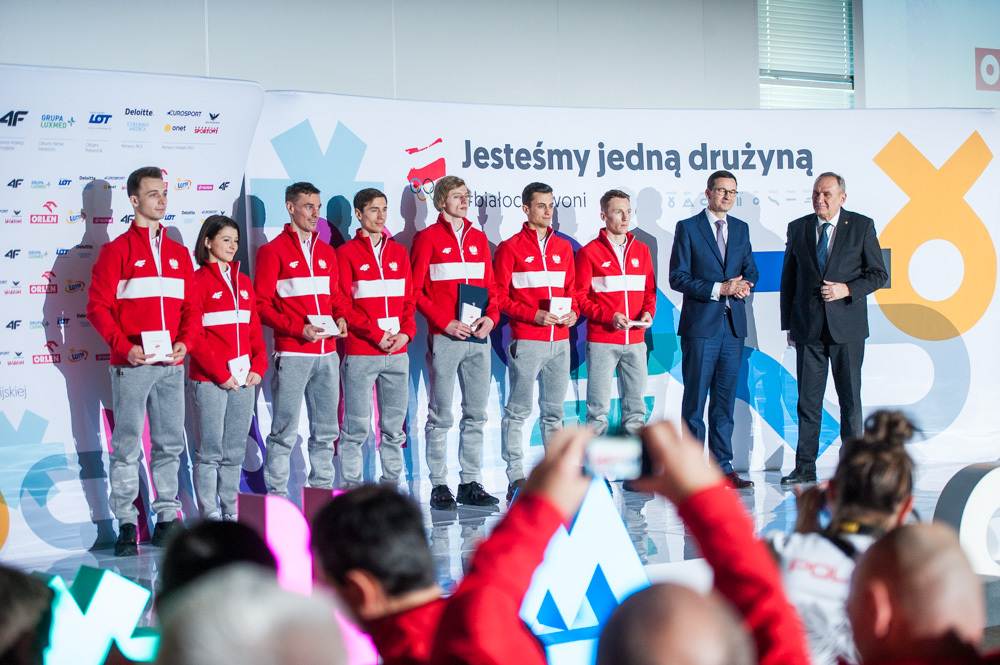

The following is the list of number of competitors participating at the Games per sport/discipline.

Sport	Men	Women	Total
Alpine skiing	2	1	3
Biathlon	2	5	7
Bobsleigh	4	0	4
Cross-country skiing	3	4	7
Figure skating	1	1	2
Freestyle skiing	0	1	1
Luge	4	2	6
Nordic combined	4	0	4
Short track speed skating	1	2	3
Ski jumping	5	0	5
Snowboarding	2	4	6
Speed skating	8	6	14
Total	36	26	62

== Alpine skiing ==
Poland qualified three athletes, two males and one female.

Athlete	Event	Run 1		Run 2		Total	
Athlete	Event	Time	Rank	Time	Rank	Time	Rank
Michał Jasiczek	Men's slalom	51.64	30	DNF			
Michał Kłusak	Men's downhill	—				1:45.42	42
Michał Kłusak	Men's super-G	—				DNF	
Michał Kłusak	Men's combined	1:22.64	46	DNF			
Maryna Gąsienica-Daniel	Women's downhill	—				1:43.30	24
Maryna Gąsienica-Daniel	Women's super-G	—				1:23.21	26
Maryna Gąsienica-Daniel	Women's giant slalom	1:13.89	24	1:11.80	28	2:25.69	27
Maryna Gąsienica-Daniel	Women's combined	1:44.35	19	42.84	13	2:27.19	16

== Biathlon ==
Based on their Nations Cup ranking in the 2016–17 Biathlon World Cup, Poland has qualified 5 women and 2 men.

Men

Athlete	Event	Time	Misses	Rank
Grzegorz Guzik	Sprint	25:52.2	2 (0+2)	59
Grzegorz Guzik	Pursuit	39:07.3	6 (2+1+2+1)	56
Grzegorz Guzik	Individual	51:51.8	2 (0+0+1+1)	33
Andrzej Nędza-Kubiniec	Sprint	25:59.2	2 (2+0)	67
Andrzej Nędza-Kubiniec	Individual	55:39.9	5 (2+1+1+1)	79

Women

Athlete	Event	Time	Misses	Rank
Magdalena Gwizdoń	Sprint	23:35.7	3 (0+3)	56
Magdalena Gwizdoń	Pursuit	36:07.0	5 (1+2+2+0)	49
Magdalena Gwizdoń	Individual	51:49.7	8 (1+2+3+2)	83
Krystyna Guzik	Sprint	22:43.3	1 (1+0)	28
Krystyna Guzik	Pursuit	34:24.3	4 (1+1+1+1)	36
Krystyna Guzik	Individual	46:49.5	4 (1+0+2+1)	52
Monika Hojnisz	Sprint	23:20.6	3 (1+2)	45
Monika Hojnisz	Pursuit	35:05.6	4 (1+1+2+0)	43
Monika Hojnisz	Individual	43:02.0	1 (0+1+0+0)	6
Monika Hojnisz	Mass start	36:59.2	0 (0+0+0+0)	15
Weronika Nowakowska	Sprint	23:03.2	2 (1+1)	34
Weronika Nowakowska	Pursuit	33:46.2	2 (0+1+1+0)	30
Weronika Nowakowska	Individual	44:34.6	2 (0+0+0+2)	21
Krystyna Guzik; Magdalena Gwizdoń; Monika Hojnisz; Weronika Nowakowska	Team relay	1:12:47.0	15 (8+7)	7

Mixed

Athlete	Event	Time	Misses	Rank
Grzegorz Guzik; Andrzej Nędza-Kubiniec; Magdalena Gwizdoń; Kamila Żuk	Team relay	1:12:17.9	8 (4+4)	16

== Bobsleigh ==
Based on their Nations Cup ranking in the 2017–18 Bobsleigh World Cup, Poland has qualified Two man and Four man received the reallocated quota place.

Athlete	Event	Run 1		Run 2		Run 3		Run 4		Total	
Athlete	Event	Time	Rank	Time	Rank	Time	Rank	Time	Rank	Time	Rank
Mateusz Luty * Krzysztof Tylkowski	Two-man	49.87	21	50.10	23	49.92	24	Eliminated		2:29.89	24
Mateusz Luty * Grzegorz Kossakowski; Łukasz Miedzik; Arnold Zdebiak	Four-man	49.04	7	49.59	18	49.46	12	49.80	17	3:17.89	13

* – Denotes the driver of each sled

== Cross-country skiing ==
Poland qualified six athletes, two male and two female and two yet to be determined.

Men

Athlete	Event	Classical		Freestyle		Final		
Athlete	Event	Time	Rank	Time	Rank	Time	Deficit	Rank
Dominik Bury	15 km freestyle	—				36:11.1	+2:27.2	33
Dominik Bury	30 km skiathlon	21:38.9	59	38:44.4	51	1:23:20.3	+7:00.3	52
Kamil Bury	15 km freestyle	—				38:38.7	+4:54.8	78
Maciej Staręga	15 km freestyle	—				38:58.9	+5:15.0	82

Women

Athlete	Event	Classical		Freestyle		Final		
Athlete	Event	Time	Rank	Time	Rank	Time	Deficit	Rank
Martyna Galewicz	10 km freestyle	—				29:23.3	+4:22.8	64
Martyna Galewicz	15 km skiathlon	24:06.4	42	20:44.9	34	44:51.3	+4:06.4	41
Sylwia Jaśkowiec	10 km freestyle	—				27:21.5	+2:21.0	24
Sylwia Jaśkowiec	15 km skiathlon	23:22.5	31	20:33.8	29	43:56.3	+3:11.4	30
Justyna Kowalczyk	15 km skiathlon	22:01.1	13	20:29.7	25	42:30.8	+1:45.9	17
Justyna Kowalczyk	30 km classical	—				1:27:21.8	+5:04.2	14
Ewelina Marcisz	10 km freestyle	—				28:10.0	+3:09.5	42
Ewelina Marcisz	15 km skiathlon	23:21.9	30	20:34.8	30	43:56.7	+3:11.8	31
Martyna Galewicz; Sylwia Jaśkowiec; Justyna Kowalczyk; Ewelina Marcisz	4×5 km relay	—				54:30.9	+3:06.6	10

Sprint

Athlete	Event	Qualification		Quarterfinal		Semifinal		Final	
Athlete	Event	Time	Rank	Time	Rank	Time	Rank	Time	Rank
Kamil Bury	Men's sprint	3:17.15	28 Q	3:25.79	6	Did not advance			
Maciej Staręga	Men's sprint	3:19.42	38	Did not advance					
Kamil Bury; Maciej Staręga	Men's team sprint	—				16:21.83	7	Did not advance	
Sylwia Jaśkowiec	Women's sprint	3:27.94	37	Did not advance					
Justyna Kowalczyk	Women's sprint	3:20.00	22 Q	3:17.47	5	Did not advance			
Ewelina Marcisz	Women's sprint	3:28.11	38	Did not advance					
Sylwia Jaśkowiec; Justyna Kowalczyk	Women's team sprint	—				16:35.19	5 q	16:32.48	7

== Figure skating ==
Poland qualified one ice dancing pair, based on its placement at the 2017 World Figure Skating Championships in Helsinki, Finland. This marks the country's reappearance in the sport at the Winter Olympics, after missing the last edition in 2014.

Athlete	Event	SD		FD		Total	
Athlete	Event	Points	Rank	Points	Rank	Points	Rank
Natalia Kaliszek / Maksym Spodyriev	Ice dancing	66.06	14 Q	95.29	15	161.35	14

== Freestyle skiing ==
According to the quota allocation released on 22 January 2018, Poland qualified one athlete. On February 10, 2018 was announced that Karolina Riemen-Żerebecka won't be able to compete in the Games due to surgery of her spine.

Ski cross

Athlete	Event	Seeding		Round of 16	Quarterfinal	Semifinal	Final	
Athlete	Event	Time	Rank	Position	Position	Position	Position	Rank
Karolina Riemen-Żerebecka	Women's ski cross	Did not start						

== Luge ==
Based on the results from the fall World Cups during the 2017–18 Luge World Cup season, Poland earned the following start quotas:

Athlete	Event	Run 1		Run 2		Run 3		Run 4		Total	
Athlete	Event	Time	Rank	Time	Rank	Time	Rank	Time	Rank	Time	Rank
Maciej Kurowski	Men's singles	48.103	18	48.467	24	48.158	22	47.885	16	3:12.613	19
Mateusz Sochowicz	Men's singles	49.047	26	48.203	19	48.930	31	Eliminated		2:26.180	27
Wojciech Chmielewski; Jakub Kowalewski	Men's doubles	46.609	13	46.478	14	—				1:33.087	12
Ewa Kuls-Kusyk	Women's singles	47.037	20	46.933	22	47.212	19	Eliminated		2:21.182	20
Natalia Wojtuściszyn	Women's singles	49.133	29	46.736	17	47.290	17	Eliminated		2:23.159	25

Mixed team relay

Athlete	Event	Run 1		Run 2		Run 3		Total	
Athlete	Event	Time	Rank	Time	Rank	Time	Rank	Time	Rank
Ewa Kuls-Kusyk; Maciej Kurowski; Wojciech Chmielewski; Jakub Kowalewski	Team relay	47.711	10	49.134	8	49.568	9	2:26.413	8

== Nordic combined ==
Poland qualified four athletes and a spot in the team relay.

Athlete	Event	Ski jumping			Cross-country		Total	
Athlete	Event	Distance	Points	Rank	Time	Rank	Time	Rank
Adam Cieślar	Normal hill/10 km	81.0	68.7	44	25:30.7	39	29:38.7	42
Adam Cieślar	Large hill/10 km	119.0	89.8	33	24:07.4	21	27:23.4	33
Szczepan Kupczak	Normal hill/10 km	97.0	96.8	20	26:47.6	45	29:02.6	39
Szczepan Kupczak	Large hill/10 km	129.0	122.1	12	25:34.3	42	26:41.3	25
Wojciech Marusarz	Normal hill/10 km	79.5	61.3	45	26:50.5	46	31:27.5	47
Wojciech Marusarz	Large hill/10 km	114.0	82.3	39	Did not finish			
Paweł Słowiok	Normal hill/10 km	92.5	88.3	32	24:37.6	12	27:26.6	22
Paweł Słowiok	Large hill/10 km	119.5	93.2	32	24:13.3	25	27:16.3	29
Adam Cieślar; Szczepan Kupczak; Wojciech Marusarz; Paweł Słowiok	Team large hill/4×5 km	472.5	337.2	8	48:28.8	10	51:24.8	9

== Short track speed skating ==
Poland has qualified one skater for men's 500 m events and two skaters for women's 500 m, 1000 m and 1500 m events for the Olympics during the four World Cup events in November 2017.

Athlete	Event	Heat		Quarterfinal		Semifinal		Final	
Athlete	Event	Time	Rank	Time	Rank	Time	Rank	Time	Rank
Bartosz Konopko	Men's 500 m	41.039	2 Q	1:10.996	5	Did not advance			
Natalia Maliszewska	Women's 500 m	43.725	2 Q	43.384	3	Did not advance			
Magdalena Warakomska	Women's 500 m	44.311	4	Did not advance					
Magdalena Warakomska	Women's 1000 m	1:31.259	2 Q	1:31.698	3	Did not advance			
Magdalena Warakomska	Women's 1500 m	2:23.693	4	—		Did not advance			

Qualification legend: ADV – Advanced due to being impeded by another skater; FA – Qualify to medal round; FB – Qualify to consolation round

== Ski jumping ==
According to the quota allocation released on 22 January 2018, Poland qualified five athletes. However Piotr Żyła did not start in any.

Athlete	Event	Qualification			First round			Final			Total	
Athlete	Event	Distance	Points	Rank	Distance	Points	Rank	Distance	Points	Rank	Points	Rank
Stefan Hula	Men's normal hill	100.5	122.7	9 Q	111.0	131.8	1 Q	105.5	117.0	11	248.8	5
Maciej Kot	Men's normal hill	99.0	122.0	11 Q	99.0	109.6	20 Q	102.0	107.4	19	217.0	19
Dawid Kubacki	Men's normal hill	104.5	129.6	3 Q	88.0	92.0	35	Did not advance				
Kamil Stoch	Men's normal hill	104.0	131.7	2 Q	106.5	125.9	2 Q	105.5	123.4	6	249.3	4
Stefan Hula	Men's large hill	127.0	110.4	18 Q	132.0	131.2	12 Q	129.5	122.2	16	253.4	15
Maciej Kot	Men's large hill	138.0	124.8	8 Q	128.5	124.2	17 Q	129.5	120.4	18	244.6	19
Dawid Kubacki	Men's large hill	127.0	114.7	14 Q	134.5	137.4	5 Q	126.0	120.6	17	258.0	10
Kamil Stoch	Men's large hill	131.5	125.6	7 Q	135.0	143.8	1 Q	136.5	141.9	3	285.7	1st place, gold medalist(s)
Maciej Kot; Stefan Hula; Dawid Kubacki; Kamil Stoch	Men's team large hill	—			537.0	540.9	3 Q	536.0	531.5	3	1072.4	3rd place, bronze medalist(s)

== Snowboarding ==
According to the quota allocation released on 22 January 2018, Poland qualified five athletes.

Parallel

Athlete	Event	Qualification		Round of 16	Quarterfinal	Semifinal	Final / BM	
Athlete	Event	Time	Rank	Opposition Time	Opposition Time	Opposition Time	Opposition Time	Rank
Oskar Kwiatkowski	Men's giant slalom	1:25.72	13 Q	Dufour (FRA); L +0.10	Did not advance			
Weronika Biela	Women's giant slalom	1:35.92	24	Did not advance				
Aleksandra Król	Women's giant slalom	1:33.13	10 Q	Zogg (SUI); L +0.70	Did not advance			
Karolina Sztokfisz	Women's giant slalom	DSQ		Did not advance				

Snowboard cross

Athlete	Event	Seeding						1/8 final	Quarterfinal	Semifinal	Final	
Athlete	Event	Run 1		Run 2		Best	Seed	1/8 final	Quarterfinal	Semifinal	Final	
Athlete	Event	Time	Rank	Time	Rank	Best	Seed	Position	Position	Position	Position	Rank
Mateusz Ligocki	Men's snowboard cross	1:19.48	37	1:19.22	13	1:19.22	39	3	5	Did not advance		
Zuzanna Smykała	Women's snowboard cross	1:23.41	22	1:23.44	9	1:23.41	23	—	5	Did not advance		

== Speed skating ==
Based on the results from the fall World Cups during the 2017–18 ISU Speed Skating World Cup season, Poland earned the following start quotas:

Men

Athlete	Event	Final	
Athlete	Event	Time	Rank
Zbigniew Bródka	1500 m	1:46.31	12
Sebastian Klosinski	1000 m	1:09.59	17
Piotr Michalski	500 m	35.64	33
Piotr Michalski	1000 m	1:10.17	31
Konrad Niedźwiedzki	1000 m	1:10.026	23
Konrad Niedźwiedzki	1500 m	1:47.07	20
Artur Nogal	500 m	58.71	36
Jan Szymański	1500 m	1:46.48	16
Artur Waś	500 m	35.02	13
Adrian Wielgat	5000 m	6:31.71	22

Women

Athlete	Event	Final	
Athlete	Event	Time	Rank
Katarzyna Bachleda-Curuś	1500 m	1:58.53	13
Katarzyna Bachleda-Curuś	3000 m	4:12.57	17
Karolina Bosiek	1000 m	1:18.53	29
Karolina Bosiek	3000 m	4:12.44	16
Natalia Czerwonka	1000 m	1:15.77	12
Natalia Czerwonka	1500 m	1:57.85	9
Luiza Złotkowska	1500 m	1:58.99	17
Luiza Złotkowska	3000 m	4:09.69	14
Kaja Ziomek	500 m	39.26	25

Mass start

Athlete	Event	Semifinal			Final		
Athlete	Event	Points	Time	Rank	Points	Time	Rank
Konrad Niedźwiedzki	Men's mass start	1	8:24.73	10	Did not advance		
Magdalena Czyszczoń	Women's mass start	0	8:56.66	11	Did not advance		
Luiza Złotkowska	Women's mass start	3	9:08.41	8 Q	1	8:47.34	9

Team pursuit

Athlete	Event	Quarterfinal		Semifinal		Final	
Athlete	Event	Opposition Time	Rank	Opposition Time	Rank	Opposition Time	Rank
Katarzyna Bachleda-Curuś; Karolina Bosiek; Natalia Czerwonka; Luiza Złotkowska	Women's team pursuit	United States; L 3:04.80	8	Did not advance		Final D South Korea; W 3:03.11	7
