= Short-track speed skating at the 2018 Winter Olympics – Women's 500 metres =

Women’s 500 metres at the XXIII Olympic Winter Games
- Venue: Gangneung Ice Arena; Gangneung, South Korea
- Dates: 10 February 2018 (heats); 13 February 2018 (quarterfinals, semifinals, final)
- Competitors: 32 from 14 nations
- Winning time: 42.569

Medalists
1st place, gold medalist(s)		Arianna Fontana	Italy
2nd place, silver medalist(s)		Yara van Kerkhof	Netherlands
3rd place, bronze medalist(s)		Kim Boutin	Canada

The Women’s 500 metres in short track speed skating at the 2018 Winter Olympics took place from 10 to 13 February 2018 at the Gangneung Ice Arena in Gangneung, South Korea.

== Summary ==
The defending champion from 2014, Li Jianrou, had retired, but the 2014 silver medalist Arianna Fontana competed and eventually won the event. Elise Christie and Choi Min-jeong, who set two Olympic records each in heats and quarterfinals, were considered heavy favorites. They both qualified to the final, but Christie crashed out and finished fourth, and Choi was disqualified for interference after initially finishing second. Fontana became the Olympic champion, with Yara van Kerkhof, who was advanced to the final, winning the silver, and Kim Boutin bronze. Fontana's gold medal was the first gold medal in women's short track speed skating won by a European athlete since 1988 (when Monique Velzeboer and the Italian relay team took gold).

== Records ==
Prior to this competition, the existing world and Olympic records were as follows.

World record	Elise Christie (GBR)	42.335	Salt Lake City, United States	13 November 2016
Olympic record	Wang Meng (CHN)	42.985	Vancouver, Canada	17 February 2010

Three Olympic records were set during the competition.

Date	Round	Athlete	Country	Time	Record	Ref
10 February	Heat 8	Choi Min-jeong	South Korea	42.870	OR	
13 February	Quarterfinal 2	Elise Christie	Great Britain	42.703	OR	
13 February	Semifinal 1	Choi Min-jeong	South Korea	42.422	OR	

== Results ==
=== Heats ===
Q – qualified for Quarterfinals
PEN – penalty

Rank	Heat	Name	Country	Time	Notes
1	1	Kim Boutin	Canada	43.634	Q
2	1	Natalia Maliszewska	Poland	43.725	Q
3	1	Lana Gehring	United States	43.825	
4	1	Lucia Peretti	Italy	43.994	
1	2	Arianna Fontana	Italy	43.214	Q
2	2	Andrea Keszler	Hungary	43.274	Q
3	2	Kathryn Thomson	Great Britain	1:08.896	
4	2	Suzanne Schulting	Netherlands	DNF	
1	3	Sofia Prosvirnova	Olympic Athletes from Russia	43.376	Q
2	3	Yara van Kerkhof	Netherlands	43.430	Q
3	3	Bianca Walter	Germany	43.541	
4	3	Sumire Kikuchi	Japan	44.838	
1	4	Elise Christie	Great Britain	42.872	Q
2	4	Qu Chunyu	China	42.971	Q
3	4	Shim Suk-hee	South Korea	43.048	
4	4	Veronique Pierron	France	43.148	
1	5	Fan Kexin	China	43.350	Q
2	5	Maame Biney	United States	43.665	Q
3	5	Kim A-lang	South Korea	43.724	
4	5	Anastassiya Krestova	Kazakhstan	43.821	
1	6	Martina Valcepina	Italy	43.698	Q
2	6	Han Yutong	China	43.719	Q
3	6	Tifany Huot-Marchand	France	44.659	
	6	Jamie Macdonald	Canada		PEN
1	7	Marianne St-Gelais	Canada	43.437	Q
2	7	Anna Seidel	Germany	43.742	Q
3	7	Lara van Ruijven	Netherlands	43.771	
4	7	Magdalena Warakomska	Poland	44.311	
1	8	Choi Min-jeong	South Korea	42.870	Q, OR
2	8	Petra Jászapáti	Hungary	55.670	Q
3	8	Emina Malagich	Olympic Athletes from Russia	56.830	
	8	Charlotte Gilmartin	Great Britain		PEN

=== Quarterfinals ===
Q – qualified for Semifinals
PEN – penalty

Rank	Heat	Name	Country	Time	Notes
1	1	Arianna Fontana	Italy	43.128	Q
2	1	Yara van Kerkhof	Netherlands	43.197	Q
3	1	Natalia Maliszewska	Poland	43.384	
	1	Marianne St-Gelais	Canada		PEN
1	2	Elise Christie	Great Britain	42.703	Q, OR
2	2	Kim Boutin	Canada	42.789	Q
3	2	Andrea Keszler	Hungary	43.053	
4	2	Anna Seidel	Germany	44.325	
1	3	Sofia Prosvirnova	Olympic Athletes from Russia	43.466	Q
2	3	Fan Kexin	China	43.485	Q
3	3	Han Yutong	China	43.627	
4	3	Maame Biney	United States	44.772	
1	4	Qu Chunyu	China	42.954	Q
2	4	Choi Min-jeong	South Korea	42.996	Q
3	4	Martina Valcepina	Italy	43.023	
4	4	Petra Jászapáti	Hungary	43.043	

=== Semifinals ===
QA – qualified for Final A
QB – qualified for Final B
ADV – advanced
PEN – penalty

Rank	Semifinal	Name	Country	Time	Notes
1	1	Choi Min-jeong	South Korea	42.422	QA, OR
2	1	Arianna Fontana	Italy	42.635	QA
3	1	Sofia Prosvirnova	Olympic Athletes from Russia	43.219	QB
	1	Fan Kexin	China		PEN
1	2	Yara van Kerkhof	Netherlands	43.182	QA
2	2	Elise Christie	Great Britain	43.184	QA
3	2	Kim Boutin	Canada	43.234	ADV
	2	Qu Chunyu	China		PEN

=== Final ===
Final B was scratched as Sofia Prosvirnova (5th place overall) was the only athlete who qualified for it.

Rank	Name	Country	Time	Notes
1st place, gold medalist(s)	Arianna Fontana	Italy	42.569	
2nd place, silver medalist(s)	Yara van Kerkhof	Netherlands	43.256	
3rd place, bronze medalist(s)	Kim Boutin	Canada	43.881	
4	Elise Christie	Great Britain	1:23.063	
	Choi Min-jeong	South Korea		PEN
