= Speed skating at the 2018 Winter Olympics – Men's 5000 metres =

Men's 5000 metres at the XXIII Olympic Winter Games
- Venue: Gangneung Oval
- Date: 11 February 2018
- Competitors: 22 from 14 nations
- Winning time: 6:09.76 OR

Medalists
1st place, gold medalist(s)		Sven Kramer	Netherlands
2nd place, silver medalist(s)		Ted-Jan Bloemen	Canada
3rd place, bronze medalist(s)		Sverre Lunde Pedersen	Norway

The men's 5000 metres speed skating competition of the 2018 Winter Olympics was held at Gangneung Oval in Gangneung on 11 February 2018.

== Summary ==
The event was won by two-time defending champion Sven Kramer in an Olympic record time of 6:09:76. In doing so, he became the first man to win three gold medals in a speed skating event in three consecutive editions of the Olympics. Ted-Jan Bloemen won the silver medal, and Sverre Lunde Pedersen won the bronze medal. Bloemen and Pedersen skated in the same pair, posted the same time, and were separated by the photo finish data. Both won their first Olympic medal.

The field also included 2014 silver medalist Jan Blokhuijsen and 2010 silver medalist Lee Seung-hoon. In the 5th pair, Lee, skating against Bart Swings, posted the best time, with Swings being tentatively second. In the 8th pair, Blokhuijsen took on Peter Michael. Though trailing for most of the distance, Michael came out on top, posting the then-fastest time 0.08 seconds ahead of Lee. Blokhuijsen failed to maintain his initial pace and came home fourth. In the 9th pair, Bloemen and Pedersen crossed the finish line simultaneously, propelling them into the lead. The finish photo showed an 0.002 advantage for Bloemen, setting Pedersen back to second. In the 10th pair, Sven Kramer set a new Olympic record of 6:09:76, becoming Olympic champion in the process as the final pair of Nicola Tumolero and Moritz Geisreiter failed to challenge.

In the victory ceremony, the medals were presented by Pierre-Olivier Beckers-Vieujant, member of the International Olympic Committee accompanied by Jan Dijkema, ISU president.

== Records ==
Prior to this competition, the existing world and Olympic records were as follows.

World record	Ted-Jan Bloemen (CAN)	6:01.86	Salt Lake City, United States	10 December 2017
Olympic record	Sven Kramer (NED)	6:10.76	Sochi, Russia	8 February 2014
Track record	Sven Kramer (NED)	6:06.82		9 February 2017

The following record was set during this competition.

Date	Round	Athlete	Country	Time	Record
11 February	Pair 10	Sven Kramer	Netherlands	6:09.76	OR

OR = Olympic record

== Results ==
The races were started at 16:00.

Rank	Pair	Lane	Name	Country	Time	Time behind	Notes
1st place, gold medalist(s)	10	I	Sven Kramer	Netherlands	6:09.76	—	OR
2nd place, silver medalist(s)	9	I	Ted-Jan Bloemen	Canada	6:11.616	+1.85	
3rd place, bronze medalist(s)	9	O	Sverre Lunde Pedersen	Norway	6:11.618	+1.85	
4	8	O	Peter Michael	New Zealand	6:14.07	+4.31	
5	5	I	Lee Seung-hoon	South Korea	6:14.15	+4.39	
6	5	O	Bart Swings	Belgium	6:14.57	+4.81	
7	8	I	Jan Blokhuijsen	Netherlands	6:14.75	+4.99	
8	11	I	Nicola Tumolero	Italy	6:15.48	+5.72	
9	3	O	Seitaro Ichinohe	Japan	6:16.55	+6.79	
10	10	O	Patrick Beckert	Germany	6:17.91	+8.15	
11	7	O	Alexis Contin	France	6:18.13	+8.37	
12	11	O	Moritz Geisreiter	Germany	6:18.34	+8.58	
13	4	I	Simen Spieler Nilsen	Norway	6:18.39	+8.63	
14	1	O	Nils van der Poel	Sweden	6:19.06	+9.30	
15	4	O	Bob de Vries	Netherlands	6:22.26	+12.50	
16	2	O	Ryousuke Tsuchiya	Japan	6:22.45	+12.69	
17	3	I	Livio Wenger	Switzerland	6:24.16	+14.40	
18	6	O	Håvard Bøkko	Norway	6:24.50	+14.74	
19	7	I	Davide Ghiotto	Italy	6:29.25	+19.49	
20	6	I	Andrea Giovannini	Italy	6:30.71	+20.95	
21	2	I	Emery Lehman	United States	6:31.16	+21.40	
22	1	I	Adrian Wielgat	Poland	6:31.71	+21.95	

OR = Olympic record, TR = track record
