= Speed skating at the 2018 Winter Olympics – Women's 1500 metres =

Women's 1500 metres at the XXIII Olympic Winter Games
- Venue: Gangneung Oval, Gangneung, South Korea
- Date: 12 February 2018
- Competitors: 27 from 14 nations
- Winning time: 1:54.35

Medalists
1st place, gold medalist(s)		Ireen Wüst	Netherlands
2nd place, silver medalist(s)		Miho Takagi	Japan
3rd place, bronze medalist(s)		Marrit Leenstra	Netherlands

The women's 1500 metres speed skating competition of the 2018 Winter Olympics was held at the Gangneung Oval in Gangneung on 12 February 2018.

Dutch skater Ireen Wüst, silver medalist at the previous Winter Olympics in this discipline, won the gold medal, Miho Takagi from Japan won the silver medal and Marrit Leenstra from the Netherlands won bronze, only 0.01 seconds ahead of her fellow countrywoman Lotte van Beek. On winning the gold medal Wüst became the first athlete to win gold medals at four consecutive Winter Olympics, exactly twelve years after her first Olympic medal in the 3000 metres in 2006, and with a total of ten medals, including five golds, Wüst takes the seventh position in the list of best Winter Olympic athlete ever. Wüst also became the most decorated Olympic skater in terms of the total number of medals. For Japan's Miho Takagi, it was her first Olympic medal.

In the victory ceremony, the medals were presented by Hayley Wickenheiser, member of the International Olympic Committee accompanied by Patricia St. Peter, ISU council member.

== Summary ==
The race started at 21.30 local time. Wüst was the first of the medal candidates to set a time. She began with a false start, then at the first cross she had to slow down a little because her competitor Brianne Tutt was riding in front of her. In the first 1.5 laps she was slower compared to the previous fastest time of the American Brittany Bowe. After a quick second lap, she was faster and finished with a time of 1:54.35. Marrit Leenstra of the Netherlands, often fourth in big tournaments, was the first to challenge the time set by Wüst. The Dutch record holder, who trains with the Italian team, was at 1100 meters still below the time of Wüst, but slowed down in the final round and set a time of 1:55.26.

Lotte van Beek of the Netherlands, who won bronze in 2014 in this discipline, had a good start but with an overall time of 1:55.27 she finished just 0.01 behind Leenstra, eventually earning fourth place.

In the last race there were two main favourites, Miho Takagi from Japan who had won all races she started in this discipline in the current season, and American Heather Bergsma-Richardson, the world record holder who had won gold at the 2017 World Single Distances Championships at the Gangneung Oval. They began with a false start, then they went very fast with good intermediate times through to the end. Finally Takagi could not beat the time of Wüst and won silver in a time of 1:54.55.

== Records ==
Prior to this competition, the existing world, Olympic and track records were as follows.

World record	Heather Richardson-Bergsma (USA)	1:50.85	Salt Lake City, United States	21 November 2015
Olympic record	Jorien ter Mors (NED)	1:53.51	Sochi, Russia	16 February 2014
Track record	Heather Bergsma (USA)	1:54.08		12 February 2017

== Results ==
The race was held at 21:30.

Rank	Pair	Lane	Name	Country	Time	Time behind	Notes
1st place, gold medalist(s)	11	O	Ireen Wüst	Netherlands	1:54.35	—	
2nd place, silver medalist(s)	14	O	Miho Takagi	Japan	1:54.55	+0.20	
3rd place, bronze medalist(s)	12	I	Marrit Leenstra	Netherlands	1:55.26	+0.91	
4	13	I	Lotte van Beek	Netherlands	1:55.27	+0.92	
5	7	O	Brittany Bowe	United States	1:55.54	+1.19	
6	2	O	Nao Kodaira	Japan	1:56.11	+1.76	
7	10	I	Ida Njåtun	Norway	1:56.46	+2.11	
8	14	I	Heather Bergsma	United States	1:56.74	+2.39	
9	7	I	Natalia Czerwonka	Poland	1:57.85	+3.50	
10	4	O	Francesca Lollobrigida	Italy	1:57.94	+3.59	
11	8	I	Nikola Zdráhalová	Czech Republic	1:58.03	+3.68	
12	6	I	Gabriele Hirschbichler	Germany	1:58.24	+3.89	
13	12	O	Katarzyna Bachleda-Curuś	Poland	1:58.53	+4.16	
14	5	O	Noh Seon-yeong	South Korea	1:58.75	+4.40	
15	11	I	Brianne Tutt	Canada	1:58.77	+4.42	
16	13	O	Ayaka Kikuchi	Japan	1:58.92	+4.57	
17	8	O	Luiza Złotkowska	Poland	1:58.99	+4.64	
18	5	I	Yekaterina Aydova	Kazakhstan	1:59.05	+4.70	
19	9	O	Kali Christ	Canada	1:59.42	+5.07	
20	10	O	Hao Jiachen	China	1:59.58	+5.23	
21	1	I	Josie Morrison	Canada	1:59.77	+5.42	
22	4	I	Mia Manganello	United States	1:59.93	+5.58	
23	3	I	Tian Ruining	China	2:00.29	+5.94	
24	9	I	Roxanne Dufter	Germany	2:00.33	+5.98	
25	2	I	Francesca Bettrone	Italy	2:00.43	+6.08	
26	6	O	Huang Yu-ting	Chinese Taipei	2:18.84	+24.49	
	3	O	Maryna Zuyeva	Belarus	DQ		
