= Alexander Glavatsky-Yeadon =

British freestyle skier

Personal information
- Nationality: British Hong Kong
- Born: 24 February 1994 (age 31)
- Height: 189 cm (6 ft 2 in)

Sport
- Sport: Freestyle skiing

Alexander Glavatsky-Yeadon (born 24 February 1994) is a British freestyle skier. He competed in the 2018 Winter Olympics.

Alexander Glavatsky-Yeadon co-founded the Young Soy Gallery in Hong Kong.
