= Great Britain at the 2018 Winter Olympics =

- Flag of the United Kingdom
- IOC code: GBR
- NOC: British Olympic Association
- Website: www.teamgb.com

in Pyeongchang, South Korea 9–25 February 2018
- Competitors: 58 (34 men and 24 women) in 11 sports
- Flag bearers: Lizzy Yarnold (opening); Billy Morgan (closing)
- Medals Ranked 19th: Gold 1 Silver 0 Bronze 4 Total 5

Winter Olympics appearances (overview)
- 1924; 1928; 1932; 1936; 1948; 1952; 1956; 1960; 1964; 1968; 1972; 1976; 1980; 1984; 1988; 1992; 1994; 1998; 2002; 2006; 2010; 2014; 2018; 2022; 2026

Great Britain competed at the 2018 Winter Olympics in Pyeongchang, South Korea, from 9 to 25 February 2018, with 58 competitors in 11 sports. They won five medals in total, one gold and four bronze, ranking 19th in the medal table.

== Medallists ==
Medals by sport
Sport	1st place, gold medalist(s)	2nd place, silver medalist(s)	3rd place, bronze medalist(s)	Total
Skeleton	1	0	2	3
Freestyle skiing	0	0	1	1
Snowboarding	0	0	1	1
Total	1	0	4	5

Medals by date
Day	Date	1st place, gold medalist(s)	2nd place, silver medalist(s)	3rd place, bronze medalist(s)	Total
Day 1	10 February	0	0	0	0
Day 2	11 February	0	0	0	0
Day 3	12 February	0	0	0	0
Day 4	13 February	0	0	0	0
Day 5	14 February	0	0	0	0
Day 6	15 February	0	0	0	0
Day 7	16 February	0	0	1	1
Day 8	17 February	1	0	2	3
Day 9	18 February	0	0	0	0
Day 10	19 February	0	0	0	0
Day 11	20 February	0	0	0	0
Day 12	21 February	0	0	0	0
Day 13	22 February	0	0	0	0
Day 14	23 February	0	0	0	0
Day 15	24 February	0	0	1	1
Day 16	25 February	0	0	0	0
Total		1	0	4	5

Medals by gender
Gender	1st place, gold medalist(s)	2nd place, silver medalist(s)	3rd place, bronze medalist(s)	Total
Male	0	0	2	2
Female	1	0	2	3
Mixed	0	0	0	0
Total	1	0	4	5

Medal	Name	Sport	Event	Date
Gold	Lizzy Yarnold	Skeleton	Women's	17 February
Bronze	Dominic Parsons	Skeleton	Men's	16 February
Bronze	Izzy Atkin	Freestyle skiing	Women's Slopestyle	17 February
Bronze	Laura Deas	Skeleton	Women's	17 February
Bronze	Billy Morgan	Snowboarding	Men's Big Air	24 February

There were a number of notable firsts for Great Britain at the Winter Olympics:

- Day 8 (17 February) was the most successful day for Great Britain at any Winter Olympics, with three medals won.
- Lizzy Yarnold was the first British athlete to retain a Winter Olympic title and, in doing so, became Great Britain's most successful Winter Olympic athlete by surpassing the single gold and bronze medals won by Jeannette Altwegg, Christopher Dean and Jayne Torvill.
- Yarnold and Laura Deas were the first British athletes to win medals in the same event at the same Winter games.
- Izzy Atkin won Great Britain's first-ever medal on skis.
- On Day 15 (24 February) Great Britain won a fifth medal at a single Winter Olympics for the first time. (Note: The GBR-1 team in the Four-man bobsleigh at the 2014 Winter Olympics retrospectively received a bronze medal following disqualifications of two Russian crews, giving Great Britain five medals from that Olympics.)

== Records ==
Date	Sport	Event	Round	Athlete	Time	Record	Ref
10 February	Short track speed skating	Women's 500 metres	Heat 4	Elise Christie	42.872	OR	

== Competitors ==
The following is the list of number of competitors participating at the Games per sport/discipline. (Note: The final team selected for the Games had numbered 59, but snowboarder Katie Ormerod was forced to withdraw after suffering a broken heel in training the day before the opening ceremony.)

Sport	Men	Women	Total
Alpine skiing	2	2	4
Biathlon	0	1	1
Bobsleigh	8	2	10
Cross-country skiing	3	1	4
Curling	5	5	10
Figure skating	1	1	2
Freestyle skiing	6	5	11
Luge	2	0	2
Short track speed skating	2	3	5
Skeleton	2	2	4
Snowboarding	3	2	5
Total	34	24	58

== Medal and performance targets ==
On 9 January 2018, the funding body UK Sport announced their medal targets for Team GB at the 2018 Winter Olympic Games in Pyeongchang with the target to win at least five medals which if achieved would be a record-breaking haul for a Winter Olympic Games. Although the target was set at three medals the funding body predicted that Great Britain had the potential to win as many as ten medals, this total was not widely expected to be reached.

Key	✗ target missed	✓ target met	✓ ✓ target exceeded

Sport	Minimum target	Reach target	Medals or Best Result	Performance relative to targets
Bobsleigh	Top five	1	8th	✗
Curling	1	2	4th	✗
Figure skating	Top eight	1	11th	✗
Short track speed skating	1	2	4th	✗
Skeleton	Top eight	1	Gold Lizzy Yarnold; Bronze Laura Deas; Bronze Dominic Parsons	✓ ✓
Ski and snowboard	2	3	Bronze Izzy Atkin; Bronze Billy Morgan	✓
Total	4	10	5	✓
Total gold	n/a	n/a	1	n/a

=== UK Sport funding ===
In the Winter Olympic Cycle running from 2014 to 2018 the UK government body UK Sport allocated a record budget of over £28 million to fund Team GB for the individual athletes as well as the bobsleigh and curling teams for the 2018 Winter Olympics in Pyeongchang. The sports receiving the highest funding were bobsleigh, curling and skeleton, whilst speed skating, ski and snowboard, and figure skating also received funding, but all other winter sports where British athletes were competing did not receive any funding from the body.

Sport	Funding
Bobsleigh	£5,003,476
Curling	£5,655,150
Figure skating	£1,235,593
Short track speed skating	£4,764,006
Skeleton	£6,549,617
Ski and snowboard	£5,145,293
Total	£28,353,135

== Alpine skiing ==
Athlete	Event	Run 1		Run 2		Total	
Athlete	Event	Time	Rank	Time	Rank	Time	Rank
Dave Ryding	Men's slalom	49.09	13	51.07	9	1:40.16	9
Laurie Taylor	Men's slalom	51.08	27	52.33	25	1:43.41	26
Charlie Guest	Women's slalom	55.44	42	52.82	30	1:48.26	33
Alex Tilley	Women's giant slalom	DNF					
Alex Tilley	Women's slalom	DNF					

Mixed

Athlete	Event	Round of 16	Quarterfinals	Semifinals	Final / BM	
Athlete	Event	Opposition Result	Opposition Result	Opposition Result	Opposition Result	Rank
Dave Ryding; Laurie Taylor; Charlie Guest; Alex Tilley	Team	United States; W 2*–2	Norway; L 2–2*	did not advance		

* = decided on tie-break (combined time)

== Biathlon ==
On 22 January 2018, the British Olympic Association announced Amanda Lightfoot as the selection for their solitary representative in the Biathlon competitions. Lightfoot finished 67th in the sprint event, failing to qualify for the pursuit in which only the top 60 sprint athletes took part.

Athlete	Event	Time	Misses	Rank
Amanda Lightfoot	Women's sprint	24:15.3	3 (2+1)	67
Amanda Lightfoot	Women's individual	49:14.7	6 (2+1+0+3)	73

== Bobsleigh ==
Based on their rankings in the 2017-18 World Cup, Great Britain qualified 4 sleds.

Athlete	Event	Run 1		Run 2		Run 3		Run 4		Total	
Athlete	Event	Time	Rank	Time	Rank	Time	Rank	Time	Rank	Time	Rank
Brad Hall*; Joel Fearon	Two-man	49.37	7	49.50	8	49.67	17	49.80	16	3:18.34	12
Brad Hall*; Greg Cackett; Joel Fearon; Nick Gleeson	Four-man	49.25	19	49.68	14	49.64	17	49.69	12	3:18.26	17
Lamin Deen*; Andrew Matthews; Toby Olubi; Ben Simons	Four-man	49.44	16	49.45	19	49.66	=18	49.74	15	3:18.29	18
Mica McNeill*; Mica Moore	Two-woman	50.77	6	50.95	6	51.16	11	51.19	7	3:24.07	8

* – Denotes the driver of each sled
Sam Blanchet and Montell Douglas were travelling reserves

== Cross-country skiing ==
Andrew Musgrave's seventh place in the men's 30 km skiathlon was the best performance by a Briton in an Olympic cross country event.

Distance

Athlete	Event	Classical		Freestyle		Final		
Athlete	Event	Time	Rank	Time	Rank	Time	Deficit	Rank
Andrew Musgrave	Men's 15 km freestyle	—N/a				35:51.0	+2:07.1	28
Callum Smith	Men's 15 km freestyle	—N/a				38:20.9	+4:37.0	75
Andrew Young	Men's 15 km freestyle	—N/a				37:13.1	+3:29.2	57
Andrew Musgrave	Men's 30 km skiathlon	40:34.9	12	35:38.9	9	1:16:45.7	+25.7	7
Callum Smith	Men's 30 km skiathlon	44:47.1	61	38:29.6	45	1:23:49.9	+7:29.9	57
Andrew Musgrave	Men's 50 km classical	—N/a				2:20:57.9	+12:35.8	37
Callum Smith	Men's 50 km classical	—N/a				2:27:56.3	+19:34.2	54
Annika Taylor	Women's 10 km freestyle	—N/a				30:52.9	+5:52.4	75
Annika Taylor	Women's 15 km skiathlon	25:08.0	60	22:29.6	59	48:09.1	+7:24.2	60

Sprint

Athlete	Event	Qualification		Quarterfinal		Semifinal		Final	
Athlete	Event	Time	Rank	Time	Rank	Time	Rank	Time	Rank
Andrew Young	Men's sprint	3:21.50	45	did not advance					
Andrew Musgrave; Andrew Young	Men's team sprint	—N/a				16:30.62	15	did not advance	

== Curling ==
Great Britain qualified a men's and women's team for a total of 10 athletes (five of each gender). The teams were officially announced on 22 June 2017. Outside of the Olympic Games, Great Britain competes under the flags of its constituent home nations, Scotland, England and Wales (Northern Irish players compete for a combined Ireland); Scotland results are treated as Great Britain for the purposes of Olympic qualification.

Summary

Team	Event	Group Stage										Tiebreaker	Semifinal	Final / BM	
Team	Event	Opposition Score	Opposition Score	Opposition Score	Opposition Score	Opposition Score	Opposition Score	Opposition Score	Opposition Score	Opposition Score	Rank	Opposition Score	Opposition Score	Opposition Score	Rank
Kyle Smith; Thomas Muirhead; Kyle Waddell; Cameron Smith; Glen Muirhead	Men's tournament	(Switzerland) SUI; W 6–5	(Canada) CAN; L 4–6	(Japan) JPN; W 6–5	(Sweden) SWE; L 6–8	(South Korea) KOR; L 5–11	(Italy) ITA; W 7–6	(Denmark) DEN; W 7–6	(Norway) NOR; W 10–3	(United States) USA; L 4–10	4 TB	SUI; L 5–9	did not advance		5
Eve Muirhead; Anna Sloan; Vicki Adams; Lauren Gray; Kelly Schafer	Women's tournament	(International Olympic Committee) OAR; W 10–3	(United States) USA; L 4–7	(China) CHN; W 8–7	(Denmark) DEN; W 7–6	(South Korea) KOR; L 4–7	(Sweden) SWE; L 6–8	(Switzerland) SUI; W 8–7	(Japan) JPN; W 8–6	(Canada) CAN; W 6–5	3 Q	Bye	(Sweden) SWE; L 5–10	(Japan) JPN; L 3–5	4

=== Men's tournament ===
Based on results from the 2016 and 2017 World Championships obtained by Scotland, Great Britain qualified a men's team, consisting of five athletes, as one of the seven highest ranked nations.

Team

Position	Curler
Skip	Kyle Smith
Third	Cammy Smith
Second	Thomas Muirhead
Lead	Kyle Waddell
Alternate	Glen Muirhead

Final round robin standings
Team	Skip	Pld	W	L	PF	PA	EW	EL	BE	SE	S%	Qualification
Sweden	Niklas Edin	9	7	2	62	43	34	28	13	8	87%	Playoffs
Canada	Kevin Koe	9	6	3	56	46	36	34	14	8	87%	Playoffs
United States	John Shuster	9	5	4	67	63	37	39	4	6	80%	Playoffs
Great Britain	Kyle Smith	9	5	4	55	60	40	37	8	7	82%	Tiebreaker
Switzerland	Peter de Cruz	9	5	4	60	55	39	37	10	6	83%	Tiebreaker
Norway	Thomas Ulsrud	9	4	5	52	56	34	39	7	8	82%	
South Korea	Kim Chang-min	9	4	5	65	63	39	39	8	8	82%	
Japan	Yusuke Morozumi	9	4	5	48	56	33	35	13	5	81%	
Italy	Joël Retornaz	9	3	6	50	56	37	38	15	7	81%	
Denmark	Rasmus Stjerne	9	2	7	53	70	36	39	12	5	83%	

Round-robin

Great Britain had a bye in draws 4, 7 and 11

Draw 1

Wednesday 14 February, 09:05

Sheet D	1	2	3	4	5	6	7	8	9	10	11	Final
Switzerland (de Cruz)	0	0	0	1	0	2	0	1	0	1	0	5
Great Britain (Smith) 🔨	0	0	1	0	1	0	1	0	2	0	1	6

Draw 2

Wednesday 14 February, 20:05

Sheet A	1	2	3	4	5	6	7	8	9	10	Final
Canada (Koe) 🔨	2	0	2	0	0	0	1	0	0	1	6
Great Britain (Smith)	0	1	0	0	1	1	0	1	0	0	4

Draw 3

Thursday 15 February, 14:05

Sheet C	1	2	3	4	5	6	7	8	9	10	Final
Great Britain (Smith) 🔨	1	0	2	0	0	1	0	1	0	1	6
Japan (Morozumi)	0	1	0	0	1	0	2	0	1	0	5

Draw 5

Friday 16 February, 20:05

Sheet B	1	2	3	4	5	6	7	8	9	10	Final
Sweden (Edin) 🔨	1	0	0	2	0	3	0	0	2	X	8
Great Britain (Smith)	0	2	1	0	2	0	0	1	0	X	6

Draw 6

Saturday 17 February, 14:05

Sheet A	1	2	3	4	5	6	7	8	9	10	Final
South Korea (Kim) 🔨	0	2	1	0	2	2	0	3	1	X	11
Great Britain (Smith)	2	0	0	1	0	0	2	0	0	X	5

Draw 8

Sunday 18 February, 20:05

Sheet C	1	2	3	4	5	6	7	8	9	10	11	Final
Italy (Retornaz)	0	0	1	0	0	2	0	2	0	1	0	6
Great Britain (Smith) 🔨	2	0	0	1	0	0	2	0	1	0	1	7

Draw 9

Monday 19 February, 14:05

Sheet D	1	2	3	4	5	6	7	8	9	10	Final
Great Britain (Smith)	0	1	0	1	0	2	0	1	0	2	7
Denmark (Stjerne) 🔨	1	0	1	0	2	0	1	0	1	0	6

Draw 10

Tuesday 20 February, 09:05

Sheet A	1	2	3	4	5	6	7	8	9	10	Final
Great Britain (Smith) 🔨	3	1	0	2	0	3	1	X	X	X	10
Norway (Ulsrud)	0	0	2	0	1	0	0	X	X	X	3

Draw 12

Wednesday 21 February, 14:05

Sheet B	1	2	3	4	5	6	7	8	9	10	Final
Great Britain (Smith)	0	1	1	1	0	1	0	0	X	X	4
United States (Shuster) 🔨	2	0	0	0	3	0	1	4	X	X	10

Tiebreaker

Having finished tied for fourth with the same record in the round robin stage the Great Britain men's team faced a tiebreaker against Switzerland for a place in the semifinals.

Thursday February 22, 9:05

Sheet D	1	2	3	4	5	6	7	8	9	10	Final
Great Britain (Smith) 🔨	2	0	0	2	0	0	0	1	0	X	5
Switzerland (de Cruz)	0	1	0	0	2	1	0	0	5	X	9

=== Women's tournament ===
Based on results from the 2016 and 2017 World Women's Curling Championships, Great Britain qualified a women's team, consisting of five athletes, as one of the seven highest ranked nations.

Team

Position	Curler
Skip	Eve Muirhead
Third	Anna Sloan
Second	Vicki Adams
Lead	Lauren Gray
Alternate	Kelly Schafer

Final round robin standings
Team	Skip	Pld	W	L	PF	PA	EW	EL	BE	SE	S%	Qualification
South Korea	Kim Eun-jung	9	8	1	75	44	41	34	5	15	79%	Playoffs
Sweden	Anna Hasselborg	9	7	2	64	48	42	34	14	13	83%	Playoffs
Great Britain	Eve Muirhead	9	6	3	61	56	39	38	12	6	79%	Playoffs
Japan	Satsuki Fujisawa	9	5	4	59	55	38	36	10	13	75%	Playoffs
China	Wang Bingyu	9	4	5	57	65	35	38	12	5	78%	
Canada	Rachel Homan	9	4	5	68	59	40	36	10	12	81%	
Switzerland	Silvana Tirinzoni	9	4	5	60	55	34	37	12	7	78%	
United States	Nina Roth	9	4	5	56	65	38	39	7	6	78%	
Olympic Athletes from Russia	Victoria Moiseeva	9	2	7	45	76	34	40	8	6	76%	
Denmark	Madeleine Dupont	9	1	8	50	72	32	41	10	6	73%	

Round-robin

Great Britain had a bye in draws 4, 8 and 12

Draw 1

Wednesday 14 February, 14:05

Sheet B	1	2	3	4	5	6	7	8	9	10	Final
Olympic Athletes from Russia (Moiseeva)	0	1	0	0	2	0	0	X	X	X	3
Great Britain (Muirhead) 🔨	3	0	2	1	0	0	4	X	X	X	10

Draw 2

Thursday 15 February, 09:05

Sheet D	1	2	3	4	5	6	7	8	9	10	Final
Great Britain (Muirhead) 🔨	1	0	0	2	0	0	0	1	0	0	4
United States (Roth)	0	0	2	0	0	2	0	0	1	2	7

Draw 3

Thursday 15 February, 20:05

Sheet A	1	2	3	4	5	6	7	8	9	10	11	Final
China (Wang)	0	1	0	3	0	1	0	1	0	1	0	7
Great Britain (Muirhead) 🔨	1	0	1	0	1	0	2	0	2	0	1	8

Draw 5

Saturday 17 February, 09:05

Sheet D	1	2	3	4	5	6	7	8	9	10	Final
Denmark (Dupont)	1	0	1	0	1	0	1	0	1	1	6
Great Britain (Muirhead) 🔨	0	2	0	1	0	2	0	2	0	0	7

Draw 6

Saturday 17 February, 20:05

Sheet C	1	2	3	4	5	6	7	8	9	10	Final
South Korea (Kim)	0	0	0	1	1	0	0	2	2	1	7
Great Britain (Muirhead) 🔨	0	0	1	0	0	1	2	0	0	0	4

Draw 7

Sunday 18 February, 14:05

Sheet B	1	2	3	4	5	6	7	8	9	10	11	Final
Great Britain (Muirhead)	0	0	0	2	1	0	0	1	0	2	0	6
Sweden (Hasselborg) 🔨	0	2	1	0	0	1	0	0	2	0	2	8

Draw 9

Monday 19 February, 20:05

Sheet A	1	2	3	4	5	6	7	8	9	10	Final
Great Britain (Muirhead) 🔨	2	0	0	1	0	2	0	1	0	2	8
Switzerland (Tirinzoni)	0	0	2	0	1	0	2	0	2	0	7

Draw 10

Tuesday 20 February, 14:05

Sheet C	1	2	3	4	5	6	7	8	9	10	Final
Great Britain (Muirhead) 🔨	1	0	1	1	0	3	0	1	1	0	8
Japan (Fujisawa)	0	3	0	0	0	0	2	0	0	1	6

Draw 11

Wednesday 21 February, 09:05

Sheet D	1	2	3	4	5	6	7	8	9	10	Final
Canada (Homan)	0	2	1	0	0	1	0	0	1	0	5
Great Britain (Muirhead) 🔨	1	0	0	1	0	0	0	2	0	2	6

Semifinal

Friday 23 February, 20:05

Sheet C	1	2	3	4	5	6	7	8	9	10	Final
Sweden (Hasselborg) 🔨	0	2	0	1	0	2	3	0	2	X	10
Great Britain (Muirhead)	0	0	1	0	2	0	0	2	0	X	5

Bronze Medal Game

Saturday 24 February, 20:05

Sheet B	1	2	3	4	5	6	7	8	9	10	Final
Great Britain (Muirhead) 🔨	1	0	1	0	1	0	0	0	0	0	3
Japan (Fujisawa)	0	1	0	1	0	0	0	1	1	1	5

== Figure skating ==
Athlete	Event	SD		FD		Total	
Athlete	Event	Points	Rank	Points	Rank	Points	Rank
Nicholas Buckland / Penny Coomes	Ice dancing	68.36	10 Q	101.96	10	170.32	11

== Freestyle skiing ==
Aerials

Athlete	Event	Qualification				Final					
Athlete	Event	Jump 1		Jump 2		Jump 1		Jump 2		Jump 3	
Athlete	Event	Points	Rank	Points	Rank	Points	Rank	Points	Rank	Points	Rank
Lloyd Wallace	Men's aerials	73.06	24	100.03	14	did not advance					

Halfpipe

Athlete	Event	Qualification				Final				
Athlete	Event	Run 1	Run 2	Best	Rank	Run 1	Run 2	Run 3	Best	Rank
Murray Buchan	Men's halfpipe	66.00	65.40	66.00	14	did not advance				
Alexander Glavatsky-Yeadon	Men's halfpipe	10.80	15.00	15.00	26	did not advance				
Peter Speight	Men's halfpipe	3.80	64.60	64.60	15	did not advance				
Rowan Cheshire	Women's halfpipe	74.00	71.40	74.00	9	75.40	17.80	13.60	75.40	7
Molly Summerhayes	Women's halfpipe	60.80	66.00	66.00	17	did not advance				

Ski cross

Athlete	Event	Seeding		Round of 16	Quarterfinal	Semifinal	Final	
Athlete	Event	Time	Rank	Position	Position	Position	Position	Rank
Emily Sarsfield	Women's ski cross	1:18.25	22	2 Q	4	did not advance		

Qualification legend: FA – Qualify to medal round; FB – Qualify to consolation round

Slopestyle

Athlete	Event	Qualification				Final				
Athlete	Event	Run 1	Run 2	Best	Rank	Run 1	Run 2	Run 3	Best	Rank
Tyler Harding	Men's slopestyle	20.00	21.00	21.00	29	did not advance				
James Woods	Men's slopestyle	90.20	19.60	90.20	8	29.20	91.00	90.00	91.00	4
Isabel Atkin	Women's slopestyle	13.20	86.80	86.80	4	68.40	79.40	84.60	84.60	3rd place, bronze medalist(s)
Katie Summerhayes	Women's slopestyle	75.80	77.60	77.60	10	61.40	71.40	23.20	71.40	7

== Luge ==
On 18 January 2018, the British Olympic Association announced the selection of the athletes who will compete for Team GB in the luge in Pyeongchang. American-born Adam Rosen competed in the luge for Great Britain in his third Olympics.

Athlete	Event	Run 1		Run 2		Run 3		Run 4		Total	
Athlete	Event	Time	Rank	Time	Rank	Time	Rank	Time	Rank	Time	Rank
Adam Rosen	Men's singles	48.477	25	48.410	23	48.280	23	Eliminated		2:25.167	22
Rupert Staudinger	Men's singles	49.626	33	49.259	35	48.957	32	Eliminated		2:27.842	33

== Short track speed skating ==
Great Britain qualified five short track speed skaters (two male and three female) based on results at the 2017–18 ISU Short Track Speed Skating World Cup.

Athlete	Event	Heat		Quarterfinal		Semifinal		Final	
Athlete	Event	Time	Rank	Time	Rank	Time	Rank	Time	Rank
Joshua Cheetham	Men's 1000 m	1:26.223	3	did not advance					
Farrell Treacy	Men's 1000 m	1:26.762	2 Q	1:25.080	4	did not advance			
Farrell Treacy	Men's 1500 m	—	6	—N/a		did not advance			
Elise Christie	Women's 500 m	42.872	1 Q	42.703 OR	1 Q	43.184	2 FA	1:23.063	4
Elise Christie	Women's 1000 m	YC	—	did not advance					
Elise Christie	Women's 1500 m	2:29.316	1 Q	—N/a		PEN	5	did not advance	
Charlotte Gilmartin	Women's 500 m	PEN	4	did not advance					
Charlotte Gilmartin	Women's 1000 m	1:32.899	3	did not advance					
Charlotte Gilmartin	Women's 1500 m	2:29.005	3 Q	—N/a		3:00.691	5	did not advance	
Kathryn Thomson	Women's 500 m	1:08.896	3	did not advance					
Kathryn Thomson	Women's 1000 m	1:32.150	4	did not advance					
Kathryn Thomson	Women's 1500 m	2:32.891	4	—N/a		did not advance			

Qualification Legend: FA = Qualify to final (medal); Q = Qualify to next round; OR = Olympic record

== Skeleton ==
Based on the world rankings, Great Britain qualified 4 sleds.

Athlete	Event	Run 1		Run 2		Run 3		Run 4		Total	
Athlete	Event	Time	Rank	Time	Rank	Time	Rank	Time	Rank	Time	Rank
Dominic Parsons	Men's	50.85	5	50.41	3	50.33	3	50.61	3	3:22.20	3rd place, bronze medalist(s)
Jerry Rice	Men's	51.06	11	51.15	13	51.04	11	50.99	10	3:24.24	10
Laura Deas	Women's	52.00	6	52.03	2	51.96	5	51.91	5	3:27.90	3rd place, bronze medalist(s)
Lizzy Yarnold	Women's	51.66	1	52.30	9	51.86	2	51.46	1	3:27.28	1st place, gold medalist(s)

== Snowboarding ==
Freestyle

Athlete	Event	Qualification				Final				
Athlete	Event	Run 1	Run 2	Best	Rank	Run 1	Run 2	Run 3	Total/Best	Rank
Rowan Coultas	Men's big air	81.00	84.50	84.50	8	did not advance				
Rowan Coultas	Men's slopestyle	23.20	23.58	23.58	18	did not advance				
Billy Morgan	Men's big air	87.50	90.50	90.50	6 Q	JNS	82.50	85.50	168.00	3rd place, bronze medalist(s)
Billy Morgan	Men's slopestyle	56.40	37.55	56.40	10	did not advance				
Jamie Nicholls	Men's big air	30.00	81.25	81.25	11	did not advance				
Jamie Nicholls	Men's slopestyle	71.56	36.90	71.56	8	did not advance				
Aimee Fuller	Women's big air	25.00	14.25	25.00	25	did not advance				
Aimee Fuller	Women's slopestyle	Cancelled				34.63	41.43	CAN	41.43	17

Snowboard cross

Athlete	Event	Seeding						Quarterfinal	Semifinal	Final	
Athlete	Event	Run 1		Run 2		Best	Seed	Quarterfinal	Semifinal	Final	
Athlete	Event	Time	Rank	Time	Rank	Best	Seed	Position	Position	Position	Rank
Zoe Gillings-Brier	Women's snowboard cross	1:20.99	14	1:20.84	5	1:20.84	17	4	did not advance		

Qualification legend: FA – Qualify to medal round; FB – Qualify to consolation round NB: Katie Ormerod qualified for both the big air and slopestyle competitions, but was forced to withdraw after suffering a broken heel in training prior to the start of the games.
