= Nicola Tumolero =

Italian speed skater

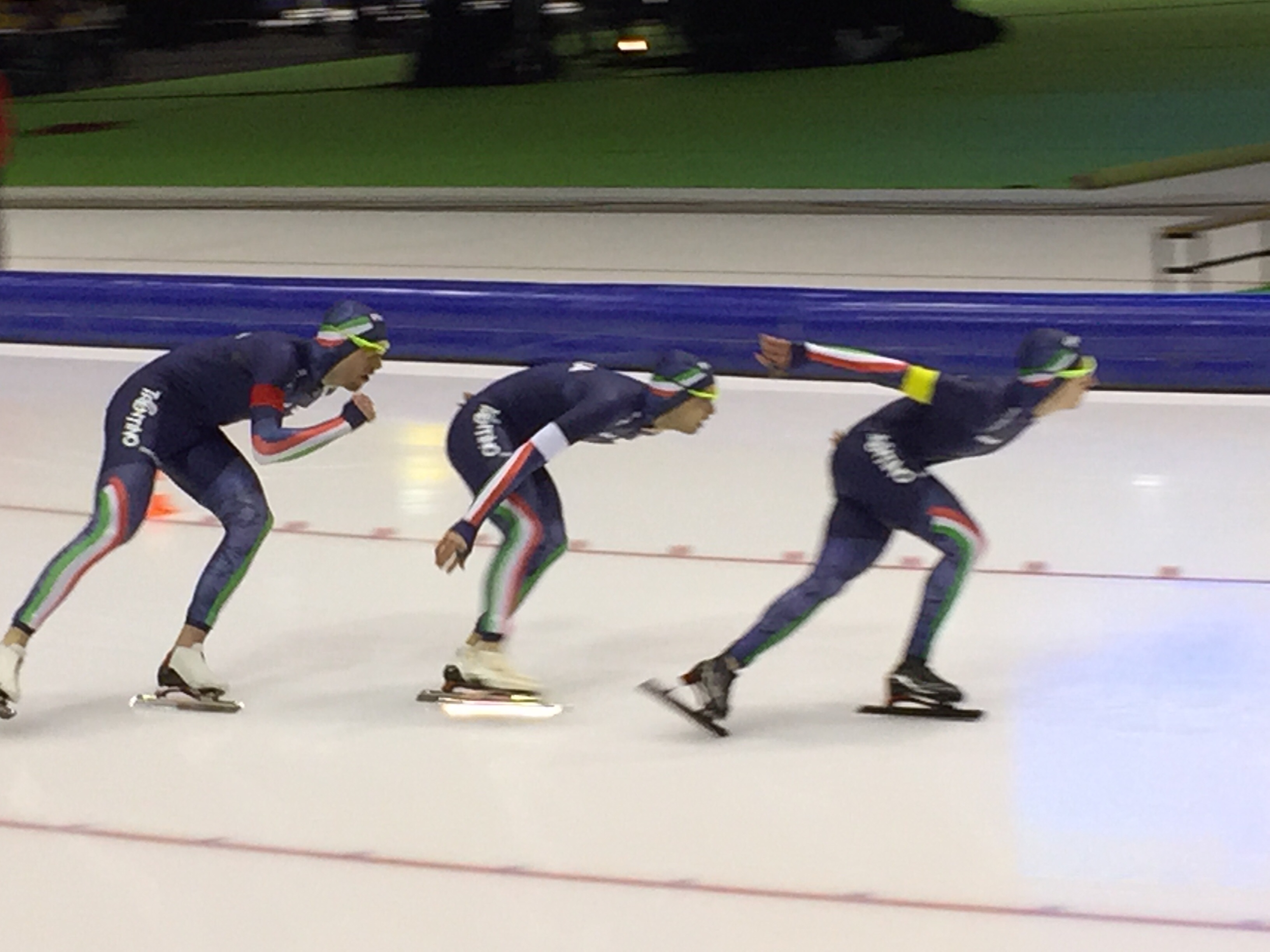

Personal information
- Nationality: Italian
- Born: 24 September 1994 (age 32) Asiago, Italy
- Height: 1.70 m (5 ft 7 in)
- Weight: 65 kg (143 lb)

Sport
- Country: Italy
- Sport: Speed skating
- Club: Fiamme Oro
- Turned pro: 2014
Medal record
Olympic Games
Bronze medal – third place	2018 Pyeongchang	10,000 m
European Championships
Gold medal – first place	2018 Kolomma	5,000 m

Nicola Tumolero (born 24 September 1994) is an Italian speed skater.

== Skating career ==
Tumolero won gold in the 5,000 meters at the 2018 European Speed Skating Championships. This was Italy's second-ever gold at the European championships, following the all-around win by Enrico Fabris 12 years earlier.

== Personal life ==
Tumolero is a police officer in Asiago.

== Personal records ==
Personal records
Men's speed skating
Event	Result	Date	Location	Notes
500 m	37:12	5 March 2016	Berlin	
1000 m	1.11.22	20 October 2017	Eisstadion Inzell, Inzell	
1500 m	1:45.07	9 December 2017	Utah Olympic Oval, Salt Lake City	
3000 m	3:39.38	21 October 2017	Eisstadion Inzell, Inzell	
5000 m	6:07.50	10 December 2017	Utah Olympic Oval, Salt Lake City	
10000 m	12:54.32	15 February 2018	Gangneung Oval, Gangneung	

He is currently in 20th position in the adelskalender.
