= Kathryn Thomson =

British speed skater

Personal information
- Born: 26 January 1996 (age 30) Irvine, Scotland
- Height: 153 cm (5 ft 0 in)
- Weight: 54 kg (119 lb)

Sport
- Country: Great Britain
- Sport: Short track speed skating

Achievements and titles
- Olympic finals: 2018, 2022
Medal record
Women's short-track speed skating
Representing Great Britain
European Championships
Silver medal – second place	2014 Dresden	3000 metre relay
European Youth Olympic Winter Festival
Silver medal – second place	2013 Brașov	500 metre

Kathryn Thomson (born 26 January 1996) is a British short track speed skater who competed in the 2018 Winter Olympics in Pyeongchang, South Korea, and the 2022 Winter Olympics in Beijing, People's Republic of China.

== Early life ==
Thomson was born in Irvine, Scotland, and raised in Kilmarnock. She attended Wellington School in Ayr and Grange Academy in Kilmarnock, before leaving full-time education at the age of 16 to pursue her career in short track speed skating.

== Career ==
In 2009, Thomson competed at the "Future Champions Trophy" in Amsterdam, Netherlands. At the time, she was training on the ice twice a week. Thomson moved to Nottingham, England in 2012, to become a full-time athlete. She is based at the National Ice Centre in Nottingham. Thomson won a silver medal in the 500 metres event at the 2013 European Youth Olympic Winter Festival. She crashed out of her 1500 metres semi-final at the Festival. At the start of the 2016–17 season, Thomson set her personal best in a World Cup event in Calgary, Canada.

Thomson qualified to compete at the 2018 Winter Olympics in the 500, 1000 and 1500 metres events. Thomson finished fourth in her 1500 metres heat, and did not qualify for the final. She finished third in her 500 metres heat, and did not qualify for the quarter final, and fourth in her 1,000 metres heat, again not qualifying for the quarter final. She was part of the British team that came third in the mixed team relay at the 2018–19 ISU Short Track Speed Skating World Cup event in Dresden. During the COVID-19 pandemic, Thomson moved in with her parents and worked in a Dunelm furniture store to fund her participation in short track speed skating; the sport did not receive funding for the 2018–2022 funding cycle, and it cost Thomson £22,000 to compete in the 2021–22 season.

At the British trials for the 2022 Winter Olympics, Thomson won the 7-lap time trial, 1 lap with a flying start, 1.5 laps from standing start and 500 metres events. She tied for first in the 1,500 metres event with Elise Christie. Thomson was selected for the 2022 Games in the 500, 1000 and 1500 metres events. In the 500 and 1000 metres events, she finished last in her heat. She withdrew on medical grounds from the 1500 metre event before her first heat.
