= Kim Boutin =

Canadian speed skater (born 1994)

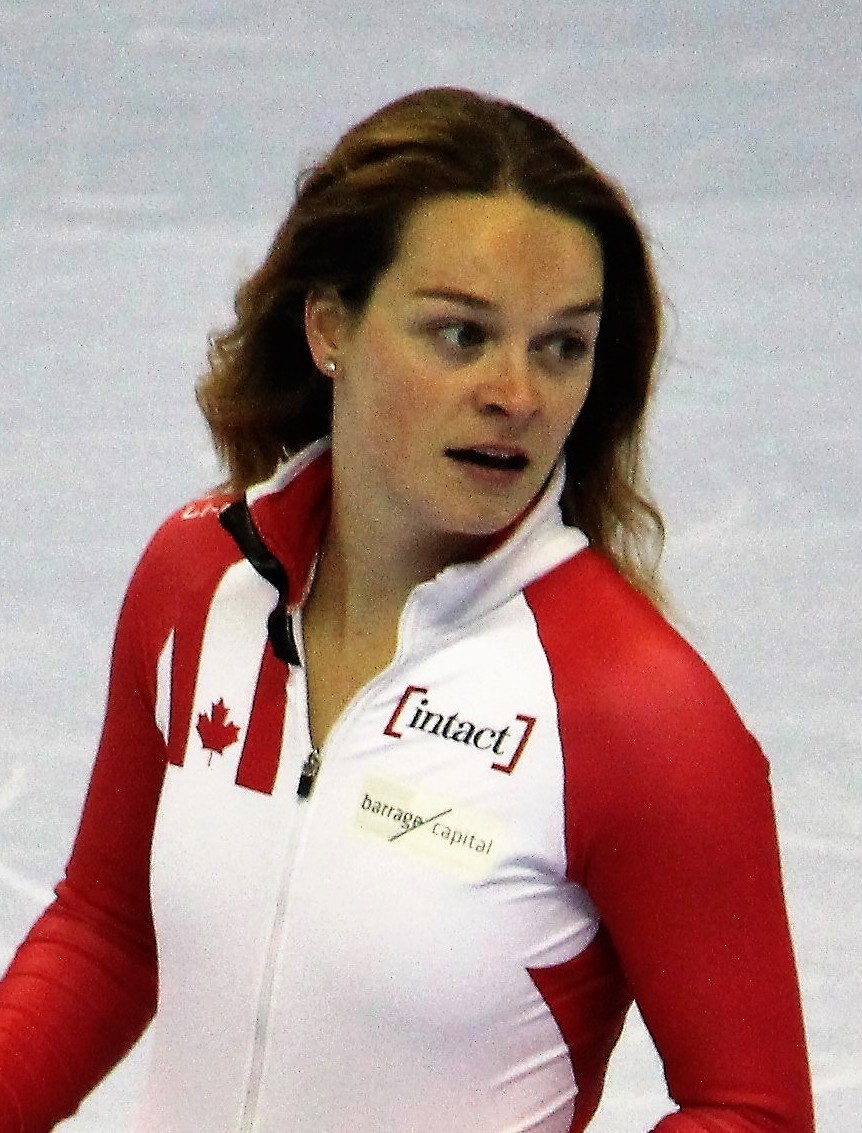
- Boutin in 2017

Personal information
- Born: December 16, 1994 (age 31) Sherbrooke, Quebec, Canada
- Height: 1.65 m (5 ft 5 in)
- Weight: 58 kg (128 lb)

Sport
- Country: Canada
- Sport: Short track speed skating
- Club: CPV Sherbrooke

Achievements and titles
- Personal bests: 500 m: 41.936 WR (2019); 1000 m: 1:28.788 (2017); 1500 m: 2:18.474 (2016); 3000 m: 5:00.068 (2018)
Medal record
Women's short-track speed skating
Representing Canada
Event	1st	2nd	3rd
Olympic Games	0	2	4
World Championships	3	6	8
World Junior Championships	0	1	0
Total	3	9	12
Olympic Games
Silver medal – second place	2018 Pyeongchang	1000 m
Silver medal – second place	2026 Milano Cortina	Mixed 2000 m relay
Bronze medal – third place	2018 Pyeongchang	500 m
Bronze medal – third place	2018 Pyeongchang	1500 m
Bronze medal – third place	2022 Beijing	500 m
Bronze medal – third place	2026 Milano Cortina	3000 m relay
World Championships
Gold medal – first place	2024 Rotterdam	500 m
Gold medal – first place	2025 Beijing	3000 m relay
Gold medal – first place	2025 Beijing	2000 m mixed relay
Silver medal – second place	2019 Sofia	1500 m
Silver medal – second place	2022 Montreal	Overall
Silver medal – second place	2022 Montreal	500 m
Silver medal – second place	2022 Montreal	1000 m
Silver medal – second place	2022 Montreal	1500 m
Silver medal – second place	2022 Montreal	3000 m relay
Bronze medal – third place	2018 Montreal	1500 m
Bronze medal – third place	2018 Montreal	3000 m relay
Bronze medal – third place	2019 Sofia	Overall
Bronze medal – third place	2019 Sofia	1000 m
Bronze medal – third place	2019 Sofia	3000 m relay
Bronze medal – third place	2023 Seoul	1500 m
Bronze medal – third place	2023 Seoul	3000 m relay
Bronze medal – third place	2024 Rotterdam	3000 m relay

Kim Boutin (French pronunciation: [butɛ̃]; born December 16, 1994) is a Canadian short track speed skater. Boutin won silver in the 1,000 m and bronze in the 500 m and 1,500 m events at the 2018 Winter Olympics at Pyeonchang, Korea. She was the first Canadian female short track speed skater to win three individual Olympic medals in a single Olympics and the first Canadian woman to win an Olympic medal in the 1,500 m. As a result of her three medal performance she was named the flag bearer for Canada at the closing ceremonies for the 2018 Winter Olympics. Boutin has also won junior and senior world championships and World Cup medals.

On November 3, 2019, she set a new world-record time of 41.936 seconds in the women's 500m event, becoming the first woman to skate the 500 in under 42 seconds.

== Career ==
=== 2018 Winter Olympics ===
Boutin participated as part of Canada's team at the 2018 Winter Olympics. She came in 4th in the Women's 500 m, but following the judge's disqualification of South Korean Choi Min-jeong who finished 2nd in a photo finish, Boutin was awarded the bronze. Reports initially suggested the disqualification was due to contact with race winner Arianna Fontana but were later stated to be due to earlier contact with Boutin. The following day, it was announced that Boutin had been receiving negative comments from South Koreans, including reports of death threats. The Canadian Olympic Committee took the threats very seriously and the Royal Canadian Mounted Police were investigating the incidents. It was an emotional and painful experience for the skater, and upon receiving her medal, she was photographed in tears. She said later of it all that "it was pretty tough. I'm a sensitive person."

Boutin started in the 1,500 m heats with the threats still looming over her. She said that "of course, it scared me, and just after my warm-up, I cried. I cried a lot because I was scared. But I have a pretty awesome team behind me." She would put that fear behind her in the final of the 1,500 m when she skated out in front and led the pack until the second last lap when she was passed by Choi but hung on for the bronze medal. This was her second individual medal of the games and made her the first female Canadian short track speed skater to win two individual medals in a single Olympics. Boutin would go on to win silver in the 1,000m race a few days later, earning a medal in all three individual distances. The Canadian team made the relay finals but after being tripped up by the Korean team and the chaos that followed the Canadian women finished off the Olympic relay podium for the first time ever. As a result of her three individual short track medals, the first time ever by a Canadian female short track speed skater, Boutin was named the flag bearer for the closing ceremonies.

=== 2022 Winter Olympics ===
On January 18, 2022, Boutin was named to Canada's 2022 Olympic team. At the Olympics, Boutin won the bronze medal in the 500 metres event, matching her performance from four years prior. Later in the season, Boutin would win a silver medal in the 500 m and 1500 m at the 2022 World Short Track Speed Skating Championships.

=== 2026 Winter Olympics ===
On December 17, 2025, Boutin was named to Canada's 2026 Olympic team. In February 2026, she won a silver medal in the mixed 2000-metre relay.
