= Short-track speed skating at the 2018 Winter Olympics =

Short track speed skating at the XXIII Olympic Winter Games
- Short track speed skating pictogram at the 2018 Winter Olympics
- Venue: Gangneung Ice Arena
- Dates: 10–22 February 2018
- No. of events: 8 (4 men, 4 women)
- Competitors: 115 from 22 nations

Short track speed skating at the 2018 Winter Olympics was held at the Gangneung Ice Arena in Gangneung, South Korea. The eight events were scheduled to take place between 10 and 22 February 2018.

== Qualification ==
A total quota of 120 athletes were allowed to compete at the Games (60 men and 60 women). Countries were assigned quotas using the results of the entire 2017–18 World Cup in the autumn of 2017. Each nation was permitted to enter a maximum of five athletes per gender if it qualified a relay team and three if it did not. There were a maximum of thirty-two qualifiers for the 500m and 1000m events; thirty-six for the 1500m events; and eight for the relays.

== Competition schedule ==
The following was the competition schedule for all eight events. Sessions that included the event finals are shown in bold.

All times are (UTC+9).

Date	Time	Event
10 February	19:00	Women's 3000 metre relay
10 February	19:00	Women's 500 metres
10 February	19:00	**Men's 1500 metres**
13 February	19:00	Men's 5000 metre relay
13 February	19:00	Men's 1000 metres
13 February	19:00	**Women's 500 metres**
17 February	19:00	**Women's 1500 metres**
17 February	19:00	**Men's 1000 metres**
20 February	19:00	Women's 1000 metres
20 February	19:00	Men's 500 metres
20 February	19:00	**Women's 3000 metre relay**
22 February	19:00	**Women's 1000 metres**
22 February	19:00	**Men's 500 metres**
22 February	19:00	**Men's 5000 metre relay**

== Medal summary ==
=== Medal table ===
* Host nation (South Korea)

Rank	Nation	Gold	Silver	Bronze	Total
1	South Korea*	3	1	2	6
2	Netherlands	1	2	1	4
3	China	1	2	0	3
4	Canada	1	1	3	5
5	Italy	1	1	1	3
6	Hungary	1	0	0	1
7	United States	0	1	0	1
8	Olympic Athletes from Russia	0	0	1	1
Totals (8 entries)		**8**	**8**	**8**	**24**

=== Men's events ===
Event	Gold		Silver		Bronze	
500 metres	Wu Dajing; China	39.584 **WR**	Hwang Dae-heon; South Korea	39.854	Lim Hyo-jun; South Korea	39.919
1000 metres	Samuel Girard; Canada	1:24.650	John-Henry Krueger; United States	1:24.864	Seo Yi-ra; South Korea	1:31.619
1500 metres	Lim Hyo-jun; South Korea	2:10.485	Sjinkie Knegt; Netherlands	2:10.555	Semion Elistratov; Olympic Athletes from Russia	2:10.687
5000 metres relay	Hungary; Shaoang Liu; Sándor Liu Shaolin; Viktor Knoch; Csaba Burján	6:31.971 **OR**	China; Wu Dajing; Han Tianyu; Xu Hongzhi; Chen Dequan; Ren Ziwei^{[a]}	6:32.035	Canada; Samuel Girard; Charles Hamelin; Charle Cournoyer; Pascal Dion	6:32.282

=== Women's events ===
Event	Gold		Silver		Bronze	
500 metres	Arianna Fontana; Italy	42.569	Yara van Kerkhof; Netherlands	43.256	Kim Boutin; Canada	43.881
1000 metres	Suzanne Schulting; Netherlands	1:29.778	Kim Boutin; Canada	1:29.956	Arianna Fontana; Italy	1:30.656
1500 metres	Choi Min-jeong; South Korea	2:24.948	Li Jinyu; China	2:25.703	Kim Boutin; Canada	2:25.834
3000 metre relay	South Korea; Shim Suk-hee; Choi Min-jeong; Kim Ye-jin; Kim A-lang; Lee Yu-bin^{[a]}	4:07.361	Italy; Arianna Fontana; Lucia Peretti; Cecilia Maffei; Martina Valcepina	4:15.901	Netherlands; Suzanne Schulting; Yara van Kerkhof; Lara van Ruijven; Jorien ter Mors	4:03.471 **WR**^{[b]}

^{a} Skaters who did not participate in the final, but received medals.
^{b} The Netherlands set a world record despite not winning gold. They won bronze by default when Canada and China were both disqualified from the medal round (Final A) leaving only two teams to take gold and silver (South Korea and Italy); Netherlands had already won the previous race, the classification round (Final B), in world record time.

== Records ==
Twelve Olympic records (OR) and three world records (WR) were set during the competition.

Event	Date	Round	Athlete	Country	Time	Record	Ref
Men's 500 metres	20 February	Heat 1	Wu Dajing	China	40.264	OR	
Men's 500 metres	22 February	Quarterfinal 2	Wu Dajing	China	39.800	OR, WR	
Men's 500 metres	22 February	Final A	Wu Dajing	China	39.584	OR, WR	
Men's 1000 metres	13 February	Heat 5	Charles Hamelin	Canada	1:23.407	OR	
Men's 1500 metres	10 February	Final A	Lim Hyo-jun	South Korea	2:10.485	OR	
Men's 5000 metre relay	13 February	Semifinal 2	Hwang Dae-heon; Kim Do-kyoum; Kwak Yoon-gy; Lim Hyo-jun	South Korea	6:34.510	OR	
Men's 5000 metre relay	22 February	Final A	Shaoang Liu; Shaolin Sándor Liu; Viktor Knoch; Csaba Burján	Hungary	6:31.971	OR	
Women's 500 metres	10 February	Heat 8	Choi Min-jeong	South Korea	42.870	OR	
Women's 500 metres	13 February	Quarterfinal 2	Elise Christie	Great Britain	42.703	OR	
Women's 500 metres	13 February	Semifinal 1	Choi Min-jeong	South Korea	42.422	OR	
Women's 3000 metre relay	10 February	Semifinal 2	Fan Kexin; Han Yutong; Qu Chunyu; Zhou Yang	China	4:05.315	OR	
Women's 3000 metre relay	20 February	Final B	Suzanne Schulting; Jorien ter Mors; Lara van Ruijven; Yara van Kerkhof	Netherlands	4:03.471	OR, WR	

== Participating nations ==
A total of 115 athletes from 22 nations (including the IOC's designation of Olympic Athletes from Russia) were scheduled to participate (the numbers of athletes are shown in parentheses).

- Australia (2)
- Belarus (1)
- Belgium (2)
- Canada (10)
- China (10)
- Czech Republic (1)
- France (4)
- Germany (2)
- Great Britain (5)
- Hungary (10)
- Israel (1)
- Italy (7)
- Japan (10)
- Kazakhstan (7)
- Latvia (2)
- Netherlands (10)
- North Korea (2)
- Olympic Athletes from Russia (7)
- Poland (3)
- Singapore (1)
- South Korea (10)
- United States (8)
