= Magdalena Warakomska =

Polish short track speed skater

Personal information
- Nationality: Polish
- Born: 27 March 1997 (age 28); Białystok, Poland

Sport
- Country: Poland
- Sport: Short track speed skating

Magdalena Warakomska (born 27 March 1997) is a Polish short track speed skater. She competed in the women's 500 metres at the 2018 Winter Olympics.
