= Gangneung Oval =

Speed skating venue in South Korea

Coordinates: 37°46′44″N 128°54′00″E

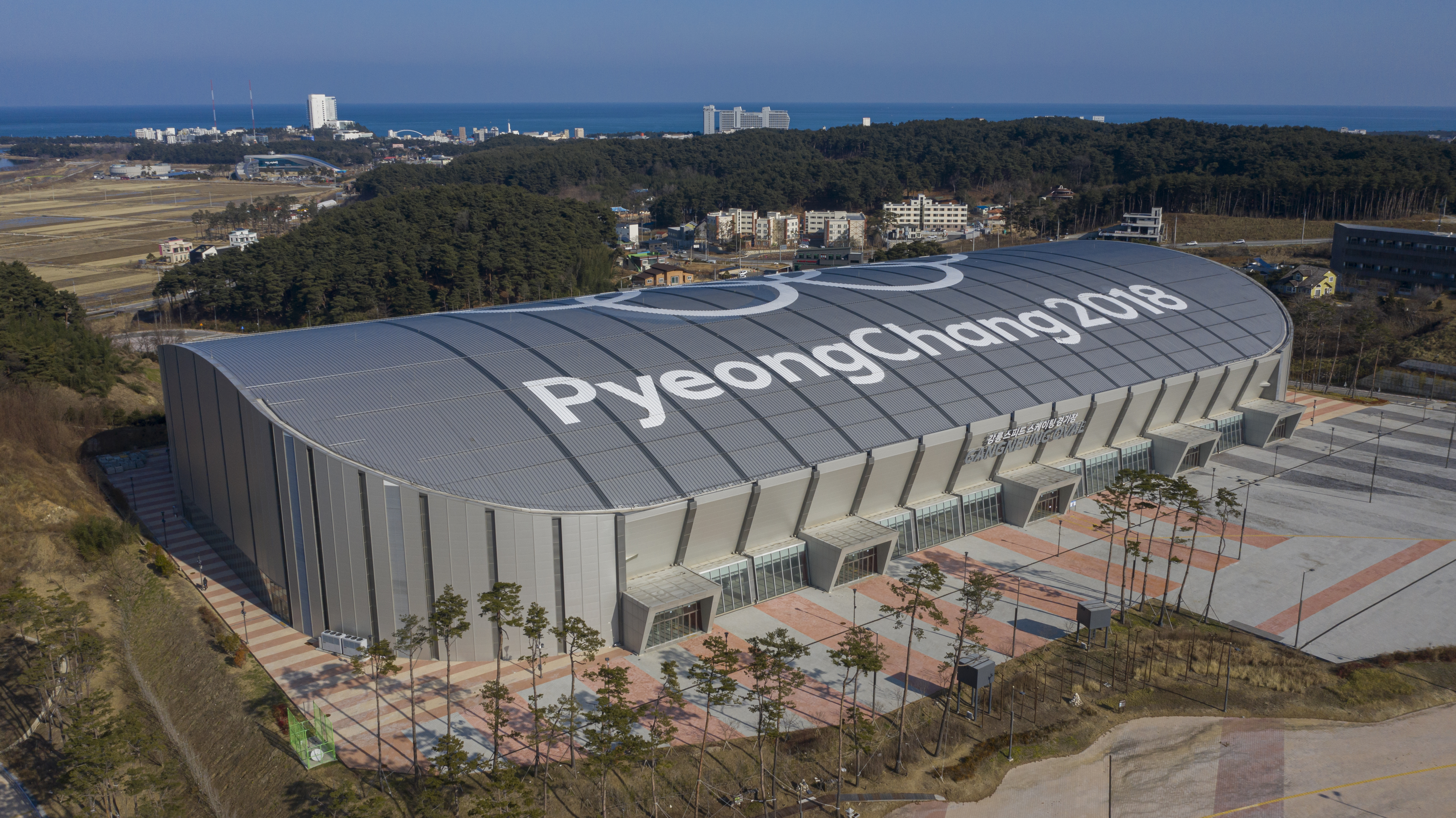
- Aerial view of the Gangneung Oval
- Interactive map of Gangneung Oval
- Capacity: 8,000 seats

Construction
- Groundbreaking: September 2013
- Opened: January 2017

Tenants
- 2017 World Single Distance Speed Skating Championships; 2018 Winter Olympics

The Gangneung Oval (Korean: 강릉 스피드 스케이팅 경기장) is a speed skating oval in South Korea, which was used for the speed skating competitions at the 2018 Winter Olympics. The building of the oval was started in September 2013. The venue consists of a double track 400 metre rink and has a capacity of 8000 seats. It has three floors above ground and two underground levels. The original plan was to build the venue at the Gangneung Science Park, but because there was limited space due to the number of local businesses taking the opportunity to relocate, the oval was built in the Gangneung Olympic Park, in the vicinity of the Gangneung Ice Arena and Gangneung Hockey Centre.

Construction of the facility was started on 29 October 2014. The speed skating rink was delivered by January 2017, in time for the first event in February: 2017 World Single Distance Speed Skating Championships.

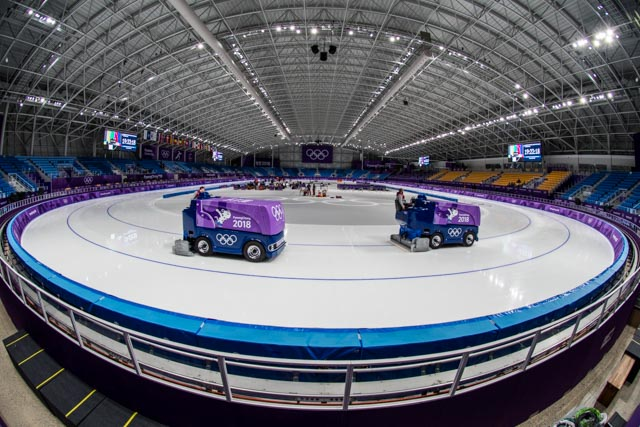

== Track records ==
=== Men ===
Event	Time	Name	Country	Date	Meet	Ref
500 metres	34.41	Håvard Holmefjord Lorentzen	Norway	19 February 2018	Olympic Games	
1000 metres	1:07.95	Kjeld Nuis	Netherlands	23 February 2018	Olympic Games	
1500 metres	1:44.01	Kjeld Nuis	Netherlands	13 February 2018	Olympic Games	
3000 metres	3:38.64	Sven Kramer	Netherlands	5 February 2018	Test Competition	
5000 metres	6:06.82	Sven Kramer	Netherlands	9 February 2017	World Single Distance Championships	
10000 metres	12:38.89	Sven Kramer	Netherlands	11 February 2017	World Single Distance Championships	
Team pursuit (8 laps)	3:37.08	Håvard Bøkko; Simen Spieler Nilsen; Sverre Lunde Pedersen	Norway	21 February 2018	Olympic Games	

=== Women ===
Event	Time	Name	Country	Date	Meet	Ref
500 metres	36.94	Nao Kodaira	Japan	18 February 2018	Olympic Games	
1000 metres	1:13.56	Jorien ter Mors	Netherlands	14 February 2018	Olympic Games	
1500 metres	1:54.08	Heather Bergsma	United States	12 February 2017	World Single Distance Championships	
3000 metres	3:59.05	Ireen Wüst	Netherlands	9 February 2017	World Single Distance Championships	
5000 metres	6:50.23	Esmee Visser	Netherlands	16 February 2018	Olympic Games	
Team pursuit (6 laps)	2:53.89	Ayano Sato; Miho Takagi; Nana Takagi	Japan	21 February 2018	Olympic Games	
