= Freestyle skiing at the 2018 Winter Olympics – Qualification =

The following is about the qualification rules and the quota allocation for the freestyle skiing events at the 2018 Winter Olympics.

== Qualification standard ==
An athlete must have placed in the top 30 in at a World Cup event after July 2016 or at the 2017 World Championships in that respective event and also have a minimum number of FIS points; 80 for all aerials, moguls, and ski-cross or 50 for halfpipe and slopestyle.

A total of 282 quota spots are available to athletes to compete at the games. A maximum of 30 athletes can be entered by a National Olympic Committee, with a maximum of 16 men or 16 women.

== Allocation of quotas ==
At the end of the qualification period of 22 January 2018 quotas will be awarded using the Olympic Quota Allocation List (which includes all results of the World Cups from July 2016 and the results of the 2017 World Championship). The spots will be awarded to each country per athlete appearing on the list starting at number one per event until a maximum for each event is reached. Once an NOC has reached the maximum of 4 quota spots in an event, it will no longer be counted for the allocation of quotas. If a nation goes over the total of 16 per sex or 30 total it is up to that nation to select its team to meet the rules by 24 January 2018. Any vacated spots will be then awarded in that event starting from the first athlete not to be awarded a quota

Current summary

(as of 5 February 2018)

NOC	Men					Women					Total
NOC	Moguls	Aerials	Ski cross	Halfpipe	Slopestyle	Moguls	Aerials	Ski cross	Halfpipe	Slopestyle	Total
Australia	4	1	1		1	4	4	1			**16**
Austria			4	3		1		2	1	1	**12**
Belarus		3					3				**6**
Canada	~~4~~ 3	~~3~~ 2	4	~~4~~ 3	4	4	1	4	~~4~~ 2	3	**30**
Chile								1		1	**2**
China		4		2		2	4		3		**15**
Czech Republic								~~2~~ 1			**1**
Denmark									1		**1**
Finland	2				1					1	**4**
France	3		4	~~3~~ 2	2	2		3	2	2	20
Germany			~~4~~ 3			~~3~~ 2		~~4~~ 2	1	1	**9**
Great Britain		1		3	2			~~2~~ 1	~~3~~ 2	~~3~~ 2	**11**
Hungary									1		**1**
Ireland				1							**1**
Italy			2					2			**4**
Japan	4	1		~~2~~ 0	1	~~4~~ 1		1	3		11
Kazakhstan	2	1				2	4				9
Mexico					1						**1**
New Zealand			1	4	~~3~~ 2				2		**9**
Norway	~~2~~ 1				4	1		**1** 0		2	**8**
Poland								1			**1**
Olympic Athletes from Russia	~~2~~ 1	4	4	~~2~~ 1		3	4	2	~~2~~ 1	2	**22**
Slovenia			1								**1**
South Korea	3			1		2	1		1	1	**9**
Sweden	3		3		4			2		2	**14**
Switzerland	~~1~~	4	4	3	4	1		4		~~3~~ 2	**22**
Ukraine		1				1	~~2~~ 1				3
United States	4	~~4~~ 3	~~1~~ 0	4	4	4	3	~~1~~ 0	4	4	**30**
Total: 28 NOCs	30	25	31	27	30	30	25	27	24	24	273

- Stricken out numbers indicated refused allocations

=== Next eligible NOC per event ===
If a country rejects a quota spot or reduces its team (in the case of Canada, and the United States) then additional quotas become available. Here the top 10 eligible countries per event (some events have less). A country can be eligible for more than one quota spot per event in the reallocation process. Bold indicates the acceptance of a quota, while a strike through indicates refusal.

Men

Quota remaining to reallocate

Moguls (4 confirmed)	Aerials (2 confirmed)	Ski Cross (1 confirmed, 1 unused)	Halfpipe (2 confirmed, 3 unused)	Slopestyle (1 confirmed)
**Australia**; **South Korea**; ~~France~~; **Australia**; ~~Olympic Athletes from Russia~~; ~~Olympic Athletes from Russia~~; **South Korea**; Sweden; Finland; Germany	**Switzerland**; **Kazakhstan**; Belarus; Kazakhstan; Japan; Kazakhstan; ~~Canada~~	~~United States~~; **Australia**; ~~Italy~~; ~~Sweden~~	**Ireland**; ~~Switzerland~~; ~~Japan~~; ~~South Korea~~; ~~France~~; **China**; ~~Olympic Athletes from Russia~~	**France**; Italy; Finland; Netherlands; Austria; Finland; Austria; Austria; Ireland; France

Women

Quota remaining to reallocate :

Moguls (4 confirmed)	Aerials (1 confirmed)	Ski Cross (2 confirmed, 5 unused)	Halfpipe (4 confirmed)	Slopestyle (2 confirmed)
**China** ~~Norway~~; **China**; ~~Great Britain~~; **Kazakhstan**; ~~South Korea~~; ~~Olympic Athletes from Russia~~; ~~Norway~~; **Ukraine**	**Kazakhstan**; ~~United States~~; ~~United States~~; Switzerland; ~~United States~~; Japan; Germany; ~~United States~~; Belarus	~~France~~; ~~Italy~~; **Switzerland**; **Chile**; ~~Olympic Athletes from Russia~~; ~~Olympic Athletes from Russia~~; ~~Great Britain~~; ~~United States~~; ~~Great Britain~~; ~~United States~~	~~Estonia~~; **Denmark**; **China**; **China**; **Hungary**; ~~Olympic Athletes from Russia~~; Netherlands; New Zealand; South Korea; New Zealand	~~Canada~~; ~~Italy~~; **Germany**; ~~Estonia~~; ~~France~~; ~~Slovakia~~; ~~New Zealand~~; **Finland**; Chile; Austria
