= Biathlon at the 2018 Winter Olympics – Women's pursuit =

Women's pursuit at the XXIII Olympic Winter Games
- Venue: Alpensia Biathlon Centre in Pyeongchang, South Korea
- Date: 12 February 2018
- Competitors: 58 from 24 nations
- Winning time: 30:35.3

Medalists
| 1st place, gold medalist(s) | | Laura Dahlmeier | Germany |
| 2nd place, silver medalist(s) | | Anastasiya Kuzmina | Slovakia |
| 3rd place, bronze medalist(s) | | Anaïs Bescond | France |

The women's 10 km pursuit biathlon competition of the Pyeongchang 2018 Olympics was held on 12 February 2018 at the Alpensia Biathlon Centre in Pyeongchang, South Korea. The field consisted of the top 60 finishers in the sprint event, held two days earlier, with competitors' starting times dependent on their final time in the sprint event. Laura Dahlmeier, who was the champion in the sprint, won a second title, becoming the first female biathlete to win an Olympic sprint-pursuit double. Anastasiya Kuzmina finished second, and Anaïs Bescond was third. This was Bescond's first Olympic medal.

== Summary ==
Dahlmeier started first, and hit all targets at her first prone shoots. The sprint silver medallist Marte Olsbu missed a target, and between the prone shoots Dalmeier was followed by Veronika Vítková and Anastasiya Kuzmina, who overtook Vítková, and by the second prone shoot closed the gap to Dahlmeier by 10 seconds. Dahlmeier, Kuzmina, and Vítková all missed a target at the second prone shoot, and Anaïs Bescond and Irene Cadurisch, who did not miss, came into contention. By 5 km, Kuzmina was leading, with Dahlmeier 0.7 seconds behind her, followed by Bescond and Cadurisch half a minute behind. In the first standing shoot, Kuzmina missed two targets, Bescond missed one, and Cadurisch missed three and dropped out of medal contention. Dahlmeier did not miss, the only one of the leading group who shot clear, and took a 40 second lead over Kuzmina. Vítková was third, followed by Bescond: all other competitors were more than a minute behind. In the second standing shoot, Dahlmeier and Bescond shot clear, whereas Kuzmina missed once, dropping almost a minute behind Dahlmeier and a second ahead of Bescond. Vítková missed two targets and dropped out of medal contention. Other competitors trailed Kuzmina and Bescond by at least 30 seconds. The only question left at this point was who would win the silver medal. Kuzmina and Bescond ran together until the finish, where Kuzmina won the silver, leaving Bescond with bronze.

In the victory ceremony, the medals were presented by Danka Barteková, member of the International Olympic Committee, accompanied by Olle Dahlin, IBU Vice President of Development.

== Schedule ==
All times are (UTC+9).

| Date | Time | Round |
|---|---|---|
| 12 February | 19:10 | Final |

== Results ==
The race was started at 19:10.

| Rank | Bib | Name | Country | Start | Time | Penalties (P+P+S+S) | Deficit |
|---|---|---|---|---|---|---|---|
| 1st place, gold medalist(s) | 1 | Laura Dahlmeier | Germany | 0:00 | 30:35.3 | 1 (0+1+0+0) | — |
| 2nd place, silver medalist(s) | 13 | Anastasiya Kuzmina | Slovakia | 0:54 | 31:04.7 | 4 (0+1+2+1) | +29.4 |
| 3rd place, bronze medalist(s) | 19 | Anaïs Bescond | France | 1:15 | 31:04.9 | 1 (0+0+1+0) | +29.6 |
| 4 | 2 | Marte Olsbu | Norway | 0:24 | 31:42.6 | 4 (1+2+0+1) | +1:07.3 |
| 5 | 7 | Hanna Öberg | Sweden | 0:41 | 31:44.2 | 3 (1+2+0+0) | +1:08.9 |
| 6 | 21 | Denise Herrmann | Germany | 1:20 | 31:54.7 | 2 (1+0+0+1) | +1:19.4 |
| 7 | 3 | Veronika Vítková | Czech Republic | 0:26 | 32:12.6 | 3 (0+1+0+2) | +1:37.3 |
| 8 | 26 | Lena Häcki | Switzerland | 1:34 | 32:16.8 | 3 (1+1+1+0) | +1:41.5 |
| 9 | 24 | Tiril Eckhoff | Norway | 1:26 | 32:23.1 | 5 (0+2+3+0) | +1:47.8 |
| 10 | 27 | Mona Brorsson | Sweden | 1:36 | 32:29.8 | 1 (0+0+1+0) | +1:54.5 |
| 11 | 6 | Lisa Vittozzi | Italy | 0:41 | 32:34.6 | 4 (1+2+0+1) | +1:59.3 |
| 12 | 12 | Franziska Hildebrand | Germany | 0:54 | 32:36.5 | 3 (2+1+0+0) | +2:01.2 |
| 13 | 5 | Vanessa Hinz | Germany | 0:40 | 32:41.4 | 4 (1+1+2+0) | +2:06.1 |
| 14 | 36 | Nadezhda Skardino | Belarus | 2:02 | 32:42.7 | 1 (0+0+1+0) | +2:07.4 |
| 15 | 18 | Dorothea Wierer | Italy | 1:14 | 32:48.4 | 5 (2+2+1+0) | +2:13.1 |
| 16 | 8 | Irene Cadurisch | Switzerland | 0:46 | 32:52.8 | 4 (0+0+3+1) | +2:17.5 |
| 17 | 17 | Iryna Kryuko | Belarus | 1:11 | 32:54.0 | 2 (1+0+0+1) | +2:18.7 |
| 18 | 14 | Vita Semerenko | Ukraine | 0:55 | 32:54.4 | 4 (2+1+1+0) | +2:19.1 |
| 19 | 53 | Rosanna Crawford | Canada | 2:23 | 33:03.0 | 2 (0+0+1+1) | +2:27.7 |
| 20 | 30 | Galina Vishnevskaya | Kazakhstan | 1:46 | 33:05.9 | 1 (0+0+1+0) | +2:30.6 |
| 21 | 37 | Linn Persson | Sweden | 2:05 | 33:21.7 | 3 (1+0+1+1) | +2:46.4 |
| 22 | 25 | Kaisa Mäkäräinen | Finland | 1:30 | 33:22.2 | 6 (0+3+3+0) | +2:46.9 |
| 23 | 23 | Jessica Jislová | Czech Republic | 1:23 | 33:24.3 | 3 (0+1+1+1) | +2:49.0 |
| 24 | 16 | Anaïs Chevalier | France | 1:09 | 33:28.0 | 5 (3+0+0+2) | +2:52.7 |
| 25 | 15 | Markéta Davidová | Czech Republic | 0:57 | 33:29.8 | 6 (1+2+1+2) | +2:54.5 |
| 26 | 22 | Johanna Talihärm | Estonia | 1:21 | 33:34.7 | 4 (0+1+2+1) | +2:59.4 |
| 27 | 4 | Marie Dorin Habert | France | 0:33 | 33:37.8 | 7 (2+0+2+3) | +3:02.5 |
| 28 | 40 | Julia Ransom | Canada | 2:08 | 33:38.3 | 1 (0+0+0+1) | +3:03.0 |
| 29 | 35 | Elisabeth Högberg | Sweden | 2:00 | 33:45.1 | 2 (1+0+1+0) | +3:09.8 |
| 30 | 34 | Weronika Nowakowska | Poland | 1:57 | 33:46.2 | 2 (0+1+1+0) | +3:10.9 |
| 31 | 20 | Tatiana Akimova | Olympic Athletes from Russia | 1:18 | 33:50.8 | 4 (1+1+0+2) | +3:15.5 |
| 32 | 43 | Eva Puskarčíková | Czech Republic | 2:14 | 33:53.8 | 3 (2+1+0+0) | +3:18.5 |
| 33 | 39 | Baiba Bendika | Latvia | 2:08 | 33:59.4 | 3 (1+0+2+0) | +3:24.1 |
| 34 | 10 | Justine Braisaz | France | 0:48 | 34:08.0 | 7 (0+2+1+4) | +3:32.7 |
| 35 | 31 | Elisa Gasparin | Switzerland | 1:46 | 34:11.2 | 5 (2+2+1+0) | +3:35.9 |
| 36 | 28 | Krystyna Guzik | Poland | 1:37 | 34:24.3 | 4 (1+1+1+1) | +3:49.0 |
| 37 | 9 | Darya Domracheva | Belarus | 0:46 | 34:26.8 | 6 (0+1+1+4) | +3:51.5 |
| 38 | 11 | Paulína Fialková | Slovakia | 0:51 | 34:33.6 | 8 (2+2+2+2) | +3:58.3 |
| 39 | 41 | Selina Gasparin | Switzerland | 2:12 | 34:40.2 | 5 (2+2+1+0) | +4:04.9 |
| 40 | 29 | Katharina Innerhofer | Austria | 1:45 | 34:41.2 | 5 (1+2+0+2) | +4:05.9 |
| 41 | 50 | Synnøve Solemdal | Norway | 2:18 | 34:45.5 | 4 (1+0+2+1) | +4:10.2 |
| 42 | 59 | Ingrid Landmark Tandrevold | Norway | 2:43 | 34:56.8 | 4 (0+3+1+0) | +4:21.5 |
| 43 | 45 | Monika Hojnisz | Poland | 2:14 | 35:05.6 | 4 (1+1+2+0) | +4:30.3 |
| 44 | 52 | Nadzeya Pisarava | Belarus | 2:23 | 35:10.3 | 3 (2+0+0+1) | +4:35.0 |
| 45 | 38 | Zhang Yan | China | 2:08 | 35:16.7 | 3 (3+0+0+0) | +4:41.4 |
| 46 | 55 | Anastasiya Merkushyna | Ukraine | 2:26 | 35:30.4 | 5 (0+2+2+1) | +4:55.1 |
| 47 | 51 | Emily Dreissigacker | United States | 2:21 | 35:36.7 | 4 (0+1+1+2) | +5:01.4 |
| 48 | 44 | Nicole Gontier | Italy | 2:14 | 35:37.6 | 7 (3+1+1+2) | +5:02.3 |
| 49 | 56 | Magdalena Gwizdoń | Poland | 2:30 | 36:07.0 | 5 (1+2+2+0) | +5:31.7 |
| 50 | 32 | Anna Frolina | South Korea | 1:51 | 36:14.2 | 8 (1+2+2+3) | +5:38.9 |
| 51 | 47 | Anja Eržen | Slovenia | 2:15 | 36:22.6 | 7 (0+2+2+3) | +5:47.3 |
| 52 | 33 | Uliana Kaisheva | Olympic Athletes from Russia | 1:52 | 36:33.6 | 5 (0+2+2+1) | +5:58.3 |
| 53 | 54 | Emma Lunder | Canada | 2:24 | 36:52.1 | 4 (0+1+1+2) | +6:16.8 |
| 54 | 49 | Sari Furuya | Japan | 2:15 | 37:02.1 | 5 (2+1+1+1) | +6:26.8 |
| 55 | 60 | Emilia Yordanova | Bulgaria | 2:44 | 37:04.3 | 6 (2+1+3+0) | +6:29.0 |
| 56 | 42 | Fuyuko Tachizaki | Japan | 2:14 | 37:07.9 | 7 (2+0+2+3) | +6:32.6 |
| 57 | 58 | Darya Klimina | Kazakhstan | 2:42 | 38:00.0 | 8 (1+1+3+3) | +7:24.7 |
| 58 | 48 | Dunja Zdouc | Austria | 2:15 | 38:39.1 | 8 (1+3+1+3) | +8:03.8 |
| | 46 | Valentyna Semerenko | Ukraine | 2:15 | DNS | | |
| | 57 | Megan Tandy | Canada | 2:37 | DNS | | |
