= Biathlon at the 2018 Winter Olympics – Women's mass start =

Women's mass start at the XXIII Olympic Winter Games
- Venue: Alpensia Biathlon Centre in Pyeongchang, South Korea
- Date: 17 February 2018
- Competitors: 30 from 13 nations
- Winning time: 35:23.0

Medalists
1st place, gold medalist(s)		Anastasiya Kuzmina	Slovakia
2nd place, silver medalist(s)		Darya Domracheva	Belarus
3rd place, bronze medalist(s)		Tiril Eckhoff	Norway

The women's 12.5 km mass start biathlon competition of the Pyeongchang 2018 Olympics was held on 17 February 2018 at the Alpensia Biathlon Centre in Pyeongchang, South Korea. Anastasiya Kuzmina won the gold medal, the defending champion Darya Domracheva took the silver, and Tiril Eckhoff replicated her 2014 bronze medal success.

== Summary ==
Kuzmina was leading from the start, and was skiing alone after the second shooting, with Domracheva ten seconds behind. In the first standing shooting, Domracheva missed a target, and Kuzmina, despite a missed target in the second standing shooting, was never seriously challenged for first place. Domracheva did not miss a target in the last shooting and went on to finish second. Eckhoff missed one target in the first prone shooting and one in the first standing shooting, and for most of the race was skiing in the middle of the field. However, in the last shooting all of her direct competitors missed, and she left the shooting range in third place and went on to take the bronze medal.

== Schedule ==
All times are (UTC+9).

Date	Time	Round
17 February	20:15	Final

== Results ==
The race was started at 20:15.

Rank	Bib	Name	Country	Time	Penalties (P+P+S+S)	Deficit
1st place, gold medalist(s)	4	Anastasiya Kuzmina	Slovakia	35:23.0	1 (0+0+0+1)	—
2nd place, silver medalist(s)	9	Darya Domracheva	Belarus	35:41.8	1 (0+0+1+0)	+18.8
3rd place, bronze medalist(s)	18	Tiril Eckhoff	Norway	35:50.7	2 (1+0+1+0)	+27.7
4	13	Lisa Vittozzi	Italy	36:08.6	2 (1+0+0+1)	+45.6
5	2	Hanna Öberg	Sweden	36:09.5	1 (0+0+1+0)	+46.5
6	8	Dorothea Wierer	Italy	36:10.3	1 (0+0+0+1)	+47.3
7	19	Nadezhda Skardino	Belarus	36:10.9	0 (0+0+0+0)	+47.9
8	3	Marte Olsbu	Norway	36:14.6	1 (0+1+0+0)	+51.6
9	21	Marie Dorin Habert	France	36:20.9	2 (0+1+0+1)	+57.9
10	7	Kaisa Mäkäräinen	Finland	36:23.9	2 (0+1+0+1)	+1:00.9
11	10	Denise Herrmann	Germany	36:27.2	2 (0+0+2+0)	+1:04.2
12	28	Franziska Preuß	Germany	36:38.9	1 (0+0+1+0)	+1:15.9
13	17	Mona Brorsson	Sweden	36:55.3	1 (0+0+1+0)	+1:32.3
14	5	Veronika Vítková	Czech Republic	36:57.8	1 (0+0+0+1)	+1:34.8
15	30	Monika Hojnisz	Poland	36:59.2	0 (0+0+0+0)	+1:36.2
16	1	Laura Dahlmeier	Germany	37:10.1	2 (1+1+0+0)	+1:47.1
17	6	Anaïs Bescond	France	37:23.5	4 (1+0+2+1)	+2:00.5
18	29	Markéta Davidová	Czech Republic	37:23.8	3 (0+1+1+1)	+2:00.8
19	14	Valj Semerenko	Ukraine	37:39.9	1 (1+0+0+0)	+2:16.9
20	11	Justine Braisaz	France	37:49.6	5 (0+1+3+1)	+2:26.6
21	16	Paulína Fialková	Slovakia	37:52.6	4 (1+2+0+1)	+2:29.6
22	25	Linn Persson	Sweden	37:54.5	2 (1+0+0+1)	+2:31.5
23	23	Lena Häcki	Switzerland	38:22.3	4 (1+2+0+1)	+2:59.3
24	12	Vita Semerenko	Ukraine	38:25.3	3 (0+0+3+0)	+3:02.3
25	15	Vanessa Hinz	Germany	38:52.4	4 (2+1+0+1)	+3:29.4
26	26	Iryna Kryuko	Belarus	39:04.0	4 (3+1+0+0)	+3:41.0
27	27	Elisa Gasparin	Switzerland	39:21.0	5 (0+2+1+2)	+3:58.0
28	20	Irene Cadurisch	Switzerland	39:44.7	4 (2+1+1+0)	+4:21.7
29	24	Anaïs Chevalier	France	40:39.7	6 (2+3+1+0)	+5:16.7
30	22	Tatiana Akimova	Olympic Athletes from Russia	41:32.4	6 (0+0+5+1)	+6:09.4
