= France at the 2018 Winter Olympics =

- Flag of France
- IOC code: FRA
- NOC: French National Olympic and Sports Committee
- Website: www.franceolympique.com (in French)

in Pyeongchang, South Korea 9–25 February 2018
- Competitors: 106 (63 men and 44 women) in 11 sports
- Flag bearer: Martin Fourcade
- Medals Ranked 9th: Gold 5 Silver 4 Bronze 6 Total 15

Winter Olympics appearances (overview)
- 1924; 1928; 1932; 1936; 1948; 1952; 1956; 1960; 1964; 1968; 1972; 1976; 1980; 1984; 1988; 1992; 1994; 1998; 2002; 2006; 2010; 2014; 2018; 2022; 2026

France competed at the 2018 Winter Olympics in Pyeongchang, South Korea, from 9 to 25 February 2018, with 106 competitors in 11 sports. They won 15 medals in total, five gold, four silver and six bronze, ranking 9th in the medal table.

Biathlete Martin Fourcade was the country's flag bearer during the opening ceremony, and its most successful athlete with three gold medals. Biathletes Anaïs Bescond and Marie Dorin-Habert, alpine skier Alexis Pinturault and ski racer Maurice Manificat also won multiple medals on the games.

== Medalists ==
Medal	Name	Sport	Event	Date
Gold	Perrine Laffont	Freestyle skiing	Women's moguls	11 February
Gold	Martin Fourcade	Biathlon	Men's pursuit	12 February
Gold	Pierre Vaultier	Snowboarding	Men's snowboard cross	15 February
Gold	Martin Fourcade	Biathlon	Men's mass start	18 February
Gold	Marie Dorin-Habert; Anaïs Bescond; Simon Desthieux; Martin Fourcade	Biathlon	Mixed relay	20 February
Silver	Alexis Pinturault	Alpine skiing	Men's combined	13 February
Silver	Julia Pereira de Sousa-Mabileau	Snowboarding	Women's snowboard cross	16 February
Silver	Gabriella Papadakis; Guillaume Cizeron	Figure skating	Ice dancing	20 February
Silver	Marie Martinod	Freestyle skiing	Women's halfpipe	20 February
Bronze	Anaïs Bescond	Biathlon	Women's pursuit	12 February
Bronze	Victor Muffat-Jeandet	Alpine skiing	Men's combined	13 February
Bronze	Alexis Pinturault	Alpine skiing	Men's giant slalom	18 February
Bronze	Adrien Backscheider; Jean-Marc Gaillard; Maurice Manificat; Clément Parisse	Cross-country skiing	Men's 4×10 km relay	18 February
Bronze	Maurice Manificat; Richard Jouve	Cross-country skiing	Men's team sprint	21 February
Bronze	Anaïs Chevalier; Marie Dorin-Habert; Justine Braisaz; Anaïs Bescond	Biathlon	Women's relay	22 February

Medals by sport
Sport	1st place, gold medalist(s)	2nd place, silver medalist(s)	3rd place, bronze medalist(s)	Total
Biathlon	3	0	2	5
Snowboarding	1	1	0	2
Freestyle skiing	1	1	0	2
Alpine skiing	0	1	2	3
Figure skating	0	1	0	1
Cross-country skiing	0	0	2	2
Total	5	4	6	15

Medals by date
Day	Date	1st place, gold medalist(s)	2nd place, silver medalist(s)	3rd place, bronze medalist(s)	Total
Day 1	10 February	0	0	0	0
Day 2	11 February	1	0	0	1
Day 3	12 February	1	0	1	2
Day 4	13 February	0	1	1	2
Day 5	14 February	0	0	0	0
Day 6	15 February	1	0	0	1
Day 7	16 February	0	1	0	1
Day 8	17 February	0	0	0	0
Day 9	18 February	1	0	2	3
Day 10	19 February	0	0	0	0
Day 11	20 February	1	2	0	3
Day 12	21 February	0	0	1	1
Day 13	22 February	0	0	1	1
Day 14	23 February	0	0	0	0
Day 15	24 February	0	0	0	0
Day 16	25 February	0	0	0	0

Medals by gender
Gender	1st place, gold medalist(s)	2nd place, silver medalist(s)	3rd place, bronze medalist(s)	Total
Male	3	1	4	8
Female	1	2	2	5
Mixed	1	1	0	2
Total	5	4	6	15

Multiple medalists
Name	Sport	1st place, gold medalist(s)	2nd place, silver medalist(s)	3rd place, bronze medalist(s)	Total
Martin Fourcade	Biathlon	3	0	0	3
Anaïs Bescond	Biathlon	1	0	2	3
Marie Dorin-Habert	Biathlon	1	0	1	2
Alexis Pinturault	Alpine skiing	0	1	1	2
Maurice Manificat	Cross-country skiing	0	0	2	2

== Competitors ==
The following is the list of number of competitors participating at the Games per sport/discipline.

Sport	Men	Women	Total
Alpine skiing	13	9	22
Biathlon	6	6	12
Bobsleigh	5	0	5
Cross-country skiing	9	4	13
Figure skating	4	4	8
Freestyle skiing	11	8	20
Nordic combined	5	0	5
Short track speed skating	2	2	4
Ski jumping	2	2	4
Snowboarding	5	8	13
Speed skating	1	0	1
Total	63	43	106

The list of competitors:

== Alpine skiing ==
Men

Athlete	Event	Run 1		Run 2		Total	
Athlete	Event	Time	Rank	Time	Rank	Time	Rank
Johan Clarey	Downhill	—N/a				1:42.39	18
Mathieu Faivre	Giant slalom	1:09.06	5	1:10.93	20	2:19.99	7
Thomas Fanara	Giant slalom	1:09.22	6	1:10.61	16	2:19.83	5
Blaise Giezendanner	Super-G	—N/a				1:24.82	4
Jean-Baptiste Grange	Slalom	DNF					
Thomas Mermillod-Blondin	Combined	1:20.89	17	47.13	6	2:08.02	6
Victor Muffat-Jeandet	Combined	1:21.57	29	45.97	2	2:07.54	3rd place, bronze medalist(s)
Victor Muffat-Jeandet	Giant slalom	1:09.44	8	1:10.41	10	2:19.85	6
Victor Muffat-Jeandet	Slalom	48.54	6	51.18	11	1:39.72	5
Maxence Muzaton	Downhill	—N/a				1:42.96	=23
Maxence Muzaton	Super-G	—N/a				1:26.08	18
Maxence Muzaton	Combined	1:20.58	14	DNF			
Clément Noël	Slalom	48.58	7	51.12	10	1:39.70	4
Alexis Pinturault	Combined	1:20.28	10	46.47	3	2:06.75	2nd place, silver medalist(s)
Alexis Pinturault	Giant slalom	1:08.90	2	1:10.45	12	2:19.35	3rd place, bronze medalist(s)
Alexis Pinturault	Slalom	48.34	3	51.41	14	1:39.75	6
Brice Roger	Downhill	—N/a				1:41.39	8
Brice Roger	Super-G	—N/a				1:26.10	19
Adrien Théaux	Downhill	—N/a				1:42.99	26
Adrien Théaux	Super-G	—N/a				1:25.76	15

Women

Athlete	Event	Run 1		Run 2		Total	
Athlete	Event	Time	Rank	Time	Rank	Time	Rank
Adeline Baud-Mugnier	Giant slalom	1:12.89	17	1:11.04	26	2:23.93	20
Adeline Baud-Mugnier	Slalom	52.65	31	DNF			
Taïna Barioz	Giant slalom	1:13.54	23	1:10.06	15	2:23.60	19
Anne Sophie Barthet	Combined	DNS					
Laura Gauché	Downhill	—N/a				1:42.29	22
Laura Gauché	Combined	1:42.15	11	42.64	12	2:24.79	12
Tiffany Gauthier	Downhill	—N/a				1:41.04	13
Tiffany Gauthier	Super-G	—N/a				1:22.56	22
Romane Miradoli	Downhill	—N/a				1:41.64	18
Romane Miradoli	Super-G	—N/a				1:22.36	19
Romane Miradoli	Combined	1:41.83	9	DNF			
Nastasia Noens	Slalom	51.84	23	50.44	13	1:42.28	20
Jennifer Piot	Downhill	—N/a				1:41.17	16
Jennifer Piot	Super-G	—N/a				1:22.38	20
Tessa Worley	Super-G	—N/a				1:23.54	28
Tessa Worley	Giant slalom	1:12.06	14	1:09.00	2	2:21.06	7

Mixed

Athlete	Event	Round of 16	Quarterfinals	Semifinals	Final / BM	
Athlete	Event	Opposition Result	Opposition Result	Opposition Result	Opposition Result	Rank
Julien Lizeroux; Clément Noël; Alexis Pinturault; Adeline Baud Mugnier; Nastasia Noens; Tessa Worley	Team	Canada; W 2*–2	Italy; W 3–1	Switzerland; L 1–3	Norway; L 2–2*	4

== Biathlon ==
Based on their Nations Cup rankings in the 2016–17 Biathlon World Cup, France has qualified a full team of 6 men and 6 women.

Men

Athlete	Event	Time	Misses	Rank
Simon Desthieux	Sprint	24:11.1	2 (2+0)	12
Simon Desthieux	Pursuit	33:55.4	3 (1+0+1+1)	7
Simon Desthieux	Individual	51:03.6	4 (0+2+1+1)	27
Simon Desthieux	Mass start	37:45.9	5 (1+2+2+0)	22
Quentin Fillon Maillet	Sprint	25:28.1	4 (3+1)	48
Quentin Fillon Maillet	Pursuit	37:57.2	7 (3+0+2+2)	44
Quentin Fillon Maillet	Mass start	38:57.5	7 (3+2+2+0)	29
Martin Fourcade	Sprint	24:00.9	3 (3+0)	8
Martin Fourcade	Pursuit	32:51.7	1 (1+0+0+0)	1st place, gold medalist(s)
Martin Fourcade	Individual	48:46.2	2 (0+0+0+2)	5
Martin Fourcade	Mass start	35:47.3	2 (1+0+0+1)	1st place, gold medalist(s)
Antonin Guigonnat	Sprint	24:37.5	3 (1+2)	27
Antonin Guigonnat	Pursuit	35:27.9	5 (2+1+0+2)	19
Antonin Guigonnat	Individual	50:33.5	2 (0+2+0+0)	23
Antonin Guigonnat	Mass start	37:15.3	5 (1+0+2+2)	19
Émilien Jacquelin	Individual	55:26.1	7 (2+2+2+1)	77
Simon Desthieux; Martin Fourcade; Antonin Guigonnat; Émilien Jacquelin	Team relay	1:18:43.1	3+12	5

Women

Athlete	Event	Time	Misses	Rank
Célia Aymonier	Individual	46:40.3	5 (2+1+0+2)	48
Anaïs Bescond	Sprint	22:20.8	2 (0+2)	19
Anaïs Bescond	Pursuit	31:04.9	1 (0+0+1+0)	3rd place, bronze medalist(s)
Anaïs Bescond	Individual	45:10.9	3 (2+0+1+0)	31
Anaïs Bescond	Mass start	37:23.5	4 (1+0+2+1)	17
Justine Braisaz	Sprint	21:54.1	2 (1+1)	10
Justine Braisaz	Pursuit	34:08.0	7 (0+2+1+4)	34
Justine Braisaz	Individual	46:57.2	5 (1+2+2+0)	55
Justine Braisaz	Mass start	37:49.6	5 (0+1+3+1)	20
Anaïs Chevalier	Sprint	22:15.6	2 (1+1)	16
Anaïs Chevalier	Pursuit	33:28.0	5 (3+0+0+2)	24
Anaïs Chevalier	Individual	45:01.9	3 (1+1+1+0)	28
Anaïs Chevalier	Mass start	40:39.7	6 (2+3+1+0)	29
Marie Dorin-Habert	Sprint	21:39.3	1 (1+0)	4
Marie Dorin-Habert	Pursuit	33:37.8	7 (2+0+2+3)	27
Marie Dorin-Habert	Mass start	36:20.9	2 (0+1+0+1)	9
Anaïs Bescond; Justine Braisaz; Anaïs Chevalier; Marie Dorin Habert	Team relay	1:12:21.0	0+14	3rd place, bronze medalist(s)

Mixed

Athlete	Event	Time	Misses	Rank
Anaïs Bescond; Simon Desthieux; Marie Dorin Habert; Martin Fourcade	Team relay	1:08:34.3	0+4	1st place, gold medalist(s)

== Bobsleigh ==
Based on their rankings in the 2017–18 Bobsleigh World Cup, France has qualified 2 sleds.

Athlete	Event	Run 1		Run 2		Run 3		Run 4		Total	
Athlete	Event	Time	Rank	Time	Rank	Time	Rank	Time	Rank	Time	Rank
Dorian Hauterville; Romain Heinrich	Two-man	49.74	18	49.73	18	49.55	12	49.46	7	3:18.48	13
Vincent Castell; Loïc Costerg; Dorian Hauterville; Vincent Ricard	Four-man	49.09	=12	49.36	11	49.19	10	49.92	20	3:17.56	11

* – Denotes the driver of each sled

== Cross-country skiing ==
Distance
Men

Athlete	Event	Classical		Freestyle		Total		
Athlete	Event	Time	Rank	Time	Rank	Time	Deficit	Rank
Adrien Backscheider	15 km freestyle	—N/a				35:12.0	+1:28.1	17
Jean-Marc Gaillard	15 km freestyle	—N/a				35:35.2	+1:51.3	23
Jean-Marc Gaillard	30 km skiathlon	40:32.6	6	37:49.1	38	1:18:48.5	+2:28.5	28
Jean-Marc Gaillard	50 km classical	—N/a				2:14:31.4	+6:09.3	18
Jules Lapierre	30 km skiathlon	41:13.0	24	35:33.2	8	1:17:19.1	+59.1	15
Maurice Manificat	15 km freestyle	—N/a				34:10.9	+27.0	5
Maurice Manificat	30 km skiathlon	40:33.6	8	35:30.6	6	1:16:34.2	+14.2	5
Clément Parisse	15 km freestyle	—N/a				35:39.0	+1:55.1	26
Clément Parisse	30 km skiathlon	40:48.9	17	35:51.7	13	1:17:08.6	+48.6	13
Clément Parisse	50 km classical	—N/a				2:17:25.4	+9:03.3	24
Adrien Backscheider; Jean-Marc Gaillard; Maurice Manificat; Clément Parisse	4×10 km relay	—N/a				1:33:41.8	+36.9	3rd place, bronze medalist(s)

Women

Athlete	Event	Classical		Freestyle		Total		
Athlete	Event	Time	Rank	Time	Rank	Time	Deficit	Rank
Delphine Claudel	10 km freestyle	—N/a				28:58.9	+3:58.4	57
Anouk Faivre-Picon	10 km freestyle	—N/a				27:42.8	+2:42.3	35
Anouk Faivre-Picon	15 km skiathlon	21:45.5	20	19:47.3	13	42:03.8	+1:18.9	13
Coraline Hugue	10 km freestyle	—N/a				26:37.9	+1:37.4	14
Coraline Hugue	15 km skiathlon	23:43.8	49	19:41.2	11	43:56.2	+3:11.3	29
Aurore Jéan	10 km freestyle	—N/a				27:12.6	+2:12.1	22
Aurore Jéan	15 km skiathlon	22:20.6	26	20:05.6	19	43:00.8	+2:15.9	23
Delphine Claudel; Anouk Faivre-Picon; Coraline Hugue; Aurore Jéan	4×5 km relay	—N/a				55:50.2	+4:25.9	12

Sprint

Athlete	Event	Qualification		Quarterfinals		Semifinals		Final	
Athlete	Event	Time	Rank	Time	Rank	Time	Rank	Time	Rank
Lucas Chanavat	Men's sprint	3:18.46	33	did not advance					
Baptiste Gros	Men's sprint	3:16.27	20 Q	3:18.62	2 Q	3:27.44	6	did not advance	
Richard Jouve	Men's sprint	3:17.69	29 Q	3:12.40	3	did not advance			
Richard Jouve; Maurice Manificat	Men's team sprint	—N/a				16:04.45	2 Q	15:58.28	3rd place, bronze medalist(s)
Aurore Jéan	Women's sprint	3:32.45	46	did not advance					
Coraline Hugue; Aurore Jéan	Women's team sprint	—N/a				16:40.40	6 q	16:32.49	8

== Figure skating ==
France qualified eight figure skates (four men and four female), based on its placement at the 2017 World Figure Skating Championships in Helsinki, Finland. They announced part of their team on 18 December 2017.

Athlete	Event	SP		FS		Total	
Athlete	Event	Points	Rank	Points	Rank	Points	Rank
Chafik Besseghier	Men's singles	72.10	26	Did not advance			
Maé-Bérénice Méité	Ladies' singles	53.67	22 Q	106.25	18	159.92	19
Vanessa James / Morgan Ciprès	Pairs	75.34	6 Q	143.19	5	218.53	5
Gabriella Papadakis / Guillaume Cizeron	Ice dancing	81.93	2 Q	123.35	1	205.28	2nd place, silver medalist(s)
Marie-Jade Lauriault / Romain Le Gac	Ice dancing	59.97	18 Q	89.62	17	149.59	17

Team event

Athlete	Event	Short program/Short dance						Free skate/Free dance					
Athlete	Event	Men's	Ladies'	Pairs	Ice dance	Total		Men's	Ladies'	Pairs	Ice dance	Total	
Athlete	Event	Points Team points	Points Team points	Points Team points	Points Team points	Points	Rank	Points Team points	Points Team points	Points Team points	Points Team points	Points	Rank
Chafik Besseghier (M); Maé-Bérénice Méité (L); Vanessa James / Morgan Ciprès (P); Marie-Jade Lauriault / Romain Le Gac (ID)	Team event	61.06; 1	46.62; 2	68.49; 5	57.94; 5	13	10	Did not advance					

== Freestyle skiing ==
Halfpipe

Athlete	Event	Qualification				Final				
Athlete	Event	Run 1	Run 2	Best	Rank	Run 1	Run 2	Run 3	Best	Rank
Thomas Krief	Men's halfpipe	74.40	25.80	74.40	10 Q	9.80	DNS		9.80	10
Kevin Rolland	Men's halfpipe	87.80	37.80	87.80	6 Q	6.40	6.40	5.60	6.40	11
Anais Caradeux	Women's halfpipe	25.00	72.80	72.80	12 Q	Did not start				
Marie Martinod	Women's halfpipe	91.60	92.00	92.00	2 Q	92.20	92.60	23.20	92.60	2nd place, silver medalist(s)

Moguls

Athlete	Event	Qualification								Final											
Athlete	Event	Run 1				Run 2				Run 1				Run 2				Run 3			
Athlete	Event	Time	Points	Total	Rank	Time	Points	Total	Rank	Time	Points	Total	Rank	Time	Points	Total	Rank	Time	Points	Total	Rank
Anthony Benna	Men's moguls	25.48	61.88	76.28	12	25.45	45.86	60.30	6 Q	24.85	51.20	76.43	13	Did not advance							
Benjamin Cavet	Men's moguls	26.40	59.55	72.74	21	25.42	56.55	71.03	15	Did not advance											
Sacha Theocharis	Men's moguls	24.89	61.37	76.55	10 QF	Bye				23.97	60.70	77.09	12 Q	25.40	19.98	34.49	9	Did not advance			
Camille Cabrol	Women's moguls	31.96	56.91	68.89	16	DNF		68.89	12	Did not advance											
Perrine Laffont	Women's moguls	28.87	64.25	79.72	1 QF	Bye				29.33	60.81	75.76	6 Q	29.78	63.42	77.86	3 Q	29.36	63.74	78.65	1st place, gold medalist(s)

Ski cross

Athlete	Event	Seeding		Round of 16	Quarterfinal	Semifinal	Final	
Athlete	Event	Time	Rank	Position	Position	Position	Position	Rank
Arnaud Bovolenta	Men's ski cross	1:10.12	14	2 Q	2 Q	3 FB	2	6
Jean-Frédéric Chapuis	Men's ski cross	1:09.84	7	2 Q	4	Did not advance		
François Place	Men's ski cross	1:10.26	18	1 Q	3	Did not advance		
Térence Tchiknavorian	Men's ski cross	1:10.41	24	DNF	Did not advance			
Alizée Baron	Women's ski cross	1:14.11	6	1 Q	2 Q	DNF FB	1	5
Marielle Berger Sabbatel	Women's ski cross	1:15.60	12	2 Q	3	Did not advance		

Qualification legend: FA – Qualify to medal round; FB – Qualify to consolation round

Slopestyle

Athlete	Event	Qualification				Final				
Athlete	Event	Run 1	Run 2	Best	Rank	Run 1	Run 2	Run 3	Best	Rank
Antoine Adelisse	Men's slopestyle	10.00	17.60	17.60	30	Did not advance				
Benoit Buratti	Men's slopestyle	67.00	62.00	67.00	21	Did not advance				
Lou Barin	Women's slopestyle	50.60	38.40	50.60	19	Did not advance				
Tess Ledeux	Women's slopestyle	69.40	28.40	69.40	15	Did not advance				

== Nordic combined ==
Athlete	Event	Ski jumping			Cross-country		Total	
Athlete	Event	Distance	Points	Rank	Time	Rank	Time	Rank
François Braud	Normal hill/10 km	101.5	108.6	12	25:12.5	30	26:40.5	15
François Braud	Large hill/10 km	121.0	112.6	17	23:39.6	12	25:24.6	15
Antoine Gérard	Normal hill/10 km	96.5	92.9	24	25:05.8	26	27:36.8	26
Antoine Gérard	Large hill/10 km	108.0	85.5	36	23:46.3	14	27:20.3	32
Maxime Laheurte	Normal hill/10 km	104.5	110.7	10	24:54.5	21	26:14.5	11
Maxime Laheurte	Large hill/10 km	128.5	122.6	11	24:17.8	27	25:22.8	14
Jason Lamy-Chappuis	Normal hill/10 km	96.0	97.7	19	25:36.9	35	27:48.9	31
Jason Lamy-Chappuis	Large hill/10 km	118.5	94.9	31	24:21.5	28	27:17.5	30
François Braud; Antoine Gérard; Maxime Laheurte; Jason Lamy-Chappuis; Laurent Muhlethaler	Team large hill/4×5 km	517.0	417.9	5	47:28.0	6	48:37.0	5

== Short track speed skating ==
According to the ISU Special Olympic Qualification Rankings, France has qualified 2 men and 2 women each.

Athlete	Event	Heat		Quarterfinal		Semifinal		Final	
Athlete	Event	Time	Rank	Time	Rank	Time	Rank	Time	Rank
Thibaut Fauconnet	Men's 500 m	1:04.756	4	Did not advance					
Thibaut Fauconnet	Men's 1000 m	1:24.381	2 Q	1:24.344	3	Did not advance			
Thibaut Fauconnet	Men's 1500 m	2:15.768	2 Q	—N/a		2:12.049	2 FA	2:53.150	7
Sébastien Lepape	Men's 500 m	40.900	3	Did not advance					
Sébastien Lepape	Men's 1000 m	1:23.489	3	Did not advance					
Sébastien Lepape	Men's 1500 m	2:13.965	2 Q	—N/a		2:11.967	5	Did not advance	
Tifany Huot-Marchand	Women's 500 m	44.659	3	Did not advance					
Tifany Huot-Marchand	Women's 1500 m	2:29.996	4	—N/a		Did not advance			
Véronique Pierron	Women's 500 m	43.148	4	Did not advance					
Véronique Pierron	Women's 1000 m	1:35.299	2 Q	1:30.323	4	Did not advance			
Véronique Pierron	Women's 1500 m	2:22.119	3 Q	—N/a		2:28.023	5	Did not advance	

Qualification legend: ADV – Advanced due to being impeded by another skater; FA – Qualify to medal round; FB – Qualify to consolation round

== Ski jumping ==
Athlete	Event	Qualification			First round			Final			Total	
Athlete	Event	Distance	Points	Rank	Distance	Points	Rank	Distance	Points	Rank	Points	Rank
Jonathan Learoyd	Men's normal hill	94.5	106.7	30 Q	98.5	104.1	25 Q	100.5	103.8	21	207.9	27
Jonathan Learoyd	Men's large hill	124.0	92.1	34 Q	119.5	100.1	41	did not advance				
Vincent Descombes Sevoie	Men's normal hill	86.5	92.1	44 Q	90.0	82.4	43	Did not advance				
Vincent Descombes Sevoie	Men's large hill	114.0	69.9	48 Q	105.0	75.9	50	did not advance				
Léa Lemare	Women's normal hill	—N/a			74.5	62.3	29 Q	93.5	84.5	19	146.8	28
Lucile Morat	Women's normal hill	—N/a			86.5	79.7	19 Q	86.5	75.1	27	154.8	21

== Snowboarding ==
Freestyle

Athlete	Event	Qualification				Final				
Athlete	Event	Run 1	Run 2	Best	Rank	Run 1	Run 2	Run 3	Best	Rank
Lucile Lefevre	Women's slopestyle	Canceled				28.35	17.31	CAN	28.35	25
Clémence Grimal	Women's halfpipe	14.25	13.00	14.25	24	Did not advance				
Sophie Rodriguez	Women's halfpipe	65.00	13.50	65.00	9 Q	50.50	14.75	13.75	50.50	10
Mirabelle Thovex	Women's halfpipe	62.25	64.25	64.25	10 Q	59.50	30.25	63.00	63.00	9

Parallel

Athlete	Event	Qualification		Round of 16	Quarterfinal	Semifinal	Final / BM	
Athlete	Event	Time	Rank	Opposition Time	Opposition Time	Opposition Time	Opposition Time	Rank
Sylvain Dufour	Men's giant slalom	1:25.27	4 Q	Kwiatkowski (POL); W –0.10	Coratti (ITA); W –0.19	Galmarini (SUI); L DNF	Košir (SLO); L +1.49	4

Snowboard cross

Athlete	Event	Seeding						1/8 final	Quarterfinal	Semifinal	Final	
Athlete	Event	Run 1		Run 2		Best	Seed	1/8 final	Quarterfinal	Semifinal	Final	
Athlete	Event	Time	Rank	Time	Rank	Best	Seed	Position	Position	Position	Position	Rank
Loan Bozzolo	Men's snowboard cross	1:16.15	31	1:16.11	=8	1:16.11	35	3 Q	DNF	Did not advance		
Merlin Surget	Men's snowboard cross	1:13.82	5	Bye		1:13.82	5	3 Q	DNF	Did not advance		
Pierre Vaultier	Men's snowboard cross	1:13.14	1	Bye		1:13.14	1	2 Q	1 Q	3 FA	1	1st place, gold medalist(s)
Ken Vuagnoux	Men's snowboard cross	1:14.29	10	Bye		1:14.29	10	2 Q	DNF	Did not advance		
Charlotte Bankes	Women's snowboard cross	1:18.18	5	Bye		1:18.18	5	—N/a	3 Q	DNF FB	1	7
Nelly Moenne-Loccoz	Women's snowboard cross	1:20.23	8	Bye		1:20.23	8	—N/a	3 Q	5 FB	4	10
Julia Pereira	Women's snowboard cross	1:21.72	18	1:20.17	3	1:20.17	15	—N/a	2 Q	2 FA	2	2nd place, silver medalist(s)
Chloé Trespeuch	Women's snowboard cross	1:18.51	6	Bye		1:18.51	6	—N/a	1 Q	2 FA	5	5

Qualification legend: FA – Qualify to medal round; FB – Qualify to consolation round

== Speed skating ==
France qualified one speed skater.

Individual

Athlete	Event	Final	
Athlete	Event	Time	Rank
Alexis Contin	Men's 1500 m	1:47.33	22
Alexis Contin	Men's 5000 m	6:18.13	11

Mass start

Athlete	Event	Semifinal			Final		
Athlete	Event	Points	Time	Rank	Points	Time	Rank
Alexis Contin	Men's mass start	3	8:28.70	8 Q	0	7:45.64	10
