= Biathlon at the 2018 Winter Olympics – Women's sprint =

Women's sprint at the XXIII Olympic Winter Games
- Venue: Alpensia Biathlon Centre in Pyeongchang, South Korea
- Date: 10 February 2018
- Competitors: 87 from 27 nations
- Winning time: 21:06.2

Medalists
1st place, gold medalist(s)		Laura Dahlmeier	Germany
2nd place, silver medalist(s)		Marte Olsbu	Norway
3rd place, bronze medalist(s)		Veronika Vítková	Czech Republic

The women's 7.5 km sprint competition of the Pyeongchang 2018 Olympics was held on 10 February 2018 at the Alpensia Biathlon Centre in Pyeongchang, South Korea.

== Summary ==
The field included the defending champion Anastasiya Kuzmina (who also won gold in 2010), the 2014 bronze medalist Vita Semerenko, and the 2010 bronze medalist Marie Dorin Habert. None of them returned to the podium, although Dorin Habert finished in the 4th position.

Kuzmina had the best time in the first 2.5 km but missed twice in the prone shooting and was out of medal contention after that. After the shooting, Dorothea Wierer was leading, closely followed by several athletes, but she missed twice at the standing shooting and dropped out of contention as well. After the second shooting, Laura Dahlmeier was the only athlete in the leading group who had not missed any targets. She had a lead of 13 seconds over Veronika Vítková and Marte Olsbu, and more than 20 seconds over other athletes. However, Vítková and Olsbu were early starters, and Dahlmeier did not have difficulties preserving the lead and eventually finishing in first position. Olsbu, who started just before Vítková, and after the second shooting was behind her by 0.1 seconds, won over a second on the last stretch, which was sufficient for an eventual silver medal. Vítková remained in the bronze medal position. Lisa Vittozzi, Irene Cadurisch, and Paulína Fialková were all losing about 10 seconds to Vítková and Olsbu after the second shooting (and all started after them and after Dahlmeier), but ran slower than they did. Dorin Habert was losing 13 seconds to Vítková and ran faster, but came to the finish in fourth position, 8 seconds behind Olsbu.

In the victory ceremony, the medals were presented by Valeriy Borzov, member of the International Olympic Committee, accompanied by Anders Besseberg, president of the IBU.

== Schedule ==
All times are (UTC+9).

Date	Time	Round
10 February	20:15	Final

== Results ==
The race was started at 20:15.

Rank	Bib	Name	Country	Time	Penalties (P+S)	Deficit
1st place, gold medalist(s)	23	Laura Dahlmeier	Germany	21:06.2	0 (0+0)	–
2nd place, silver medalist(s)	11	Marte Olsbu	Norway	21:30.4	1 (1+0)	+24.2
3rd place, bronze medalist(s)	12	Veronika Vítková	Czech Republic	21:32.0	1 (0+1)	+25.8
4	28	Marie Dorin Habert	France	21:39.3	1 (1+0)	+33.1
5	39	Vanessa Hinz	Germany	21:46.5	1 (0+1)	+40.3
6	48	Lisa Vittozzi	Italy	21:46.7	1 (0+1)	+40.5
7	2	Hanna Öberg	Sweden	21:47.0	1 (0+1)	+40.8
8	87	Irene Cadurisch	Switzerland	21:51.7	1 (1+0)	+45.5
9	15	Darya Domracheva	Belarus	21:52.4	2 (1+1)	+46.2
10	35	Justine Braisaz	France	21:54.1	2 (1+1)	+47.9
11	55	Paulína Fialková	Slovakia	21:56.8	1 (1+0)	+50.6
12	14	Franziska Hildebrand	Germany	21:59.9	1 (0+1)	+53.7
13	25	Anastasiya Kuzmina	Slovakia	22:00.1	3 (2+1)	+53.9
14	33	Vita Semerenko	Ukraine	22:00.7	1 (0+1)	+54.5
15	71	Markéta Davidová	Czech Republic	22:03.3	1 (1+0)	+57.1
16	52	Anaïs Chevalier	France	22:15.6	2 (1+1)	+1:09.4
17	5	Iryna Kryuko	Belarus	22:17.4	1 (0+1)	+1:11.2
18	57	Dorothea Wierer	Italy	22:20.3	2 (0+2)	+1:14.1
19	8	Anaïs Bescond	France	22:20.8	2 (0+2)	+1:14.6
20	17	Tatiana Akimova	Olympic Athletes from Russia	22:24.2	0 (0+0)	+1:18.0
21	3	Denise Herrmann	Germany	22:25.8	2 (0+2)	+1:19.6
22	13	Johanna Talihärm	Estonia	22:27.0	1 (0+1)	+1:20.8
23	36	Jessica Jislová	Czech Republic	22:29.1	1 (1+0)	+1:22.9
24	59	Tiril Eckhoff	Norway	22:32.4	4 (3+1)	+1:26.2
25	19	Kaisa Mäkäräinen	Finland	22:36.4	3 (2+1)	+1:30.2
26	62	Lena Häcki	Switzerland	22:39.7	3 (1+2)	+1:33.5
27	30	Mona Brorsson	Sweden	22:42.2	2 (1+1)	+1:36.0
28	50	Krystyna Guzik	Poland	22:43.3	1 (1+0)	+1:37.1
29	34	Katharina Innerhofer	Austria	22:51.5	1 (0+1)	+1:45.3
30	18	Galina Vishnevskaya	Kazakhstan	22:52.2	2 (2+0)	+1:46.0
31	29	Elisa Gasparin	Switzerland	22:52.4	2 (0+2)	+1:46.2
32	45	Anna Frolina	South Korea	22:56.9	3 (2+1)	+1:50.7
33	44	Uliana Kaisheva	Olympic Athletes from Russia	22:58.5	2 (1+1)	+1:52.3
34	10	Weronika Nowakowska	Poland	23:03.2	2 (1+1)	+1:57.0
35	83	Elisabeth Högberg	Sweden	23:05.9	1 (0+1)	+1:59.7
36	38	Nadezhda Skardino	Belarus	23:07.8	3 (2+1)	+2:01.6
37	69	Linn Persson	Sweden	23:11.5	3 (1+2)	+2:05.3
38	70	Zhang Yan	China	23:14.0	1 (1+0)	+2:07.8
39	58	Baiba Bendika	Latvia	23:14.6	4 (3+1)	+2:08.4
40	49	Julia Ransom	Canada	23:15.0	1 (0+1)	+2:08.8
41	9	Selina Gasparin	Switzerland	23:18.4	4 (3+1)	+2:12.2
42	16	Fuyuko Tachizaki	Japan	23:19.7	1 (0+1)	+2:13.5
43	24	Eva Puskarčíková	Czech Republic	23:19.8	3 (2+1)	+2:13.6
44	4	Nicole Gontier	Italy	23:20.0	3 (2+1)	+2:13.8
45	77	Monika Hojnisz	Poland	23:20.6	3 (1+2)	+2:14.4
46	26	Valentyna Semerenko	Ukraine	23:20.9	3 (2+1)	+2:14.7
46	27	Anja Eržen	Slovenia	23:20.9	3 (2+1)	+2:14.7
48	76	Dunja Zdouc	Austria	23:21.0	0 (0+0)	+2:14.8
49	53	Sari Furuya	Japan	23:21.5	2 (1+1)	+2:15.3
50	86	Synnøve Solemdal	Norway	23:23.9	3 (1+2)	+2:17.7
51	81	Emily Dreissigacker	United States	23:27.2	1 (0+1)	+2:21.0
52	67	Nadzeya Pisarava	Belarus	23:29.1	2 (0+2)	+2:22.9
53	22	Rosanna Crawford	Canada	23:29.2	3 (1+2)	+2:23.0
54	61	Emma Lunder	Canada	23:30.4	2 (0+2)	+2:24.2
55	7	Anastasiya Merkushyna	Ukraine	23:32.3	3 (2+1)	+2:26.1
56	68	Magdalena Gwizdoń	Poland	23:35.7	3 (0+3)	+2:29.5
57	80	Megan Tandy	Canada	23:42.8	2 (1+1)	+2:36.6
58	82	Darya Klimina	Kazakhstan	23:47.7	3 (2+1)	+2:41.5
59	72	Ingrid Landmark Tandrevold	Norway	23:49.1	4 (2+2)	+2:42.9
60	46	Emilia Yordanova	Bulgaria	23:50.0	1 (1+0)	+2:43.8
61	47	Clare Egan	United States	23:51.6	3 (1+2)	+2:45.4
62	1	Lisa Hauser	Austria	23:58.9	4 (3+1)	+2:52.7
63	43	Olga Poltoranina	Kazakhstan	23:59.6	2 (0+2)	+2:53.4
64	21	Mari Laukkanen	Finland	24:00.6	5 (3+2)	+2:54.4
65	75	Diana Rasimovičiūtė	Lithuania	24:00.8	1 (1+0)	+2:54.6
66	6	Susan Dunklee	United States	24:13.1	5 (1+4)	+3:06.9
67	51	Amanda Lightfoot	Great Britain	24:15.3	3 (2+1)	+3:09.1
68	78	Yurie Tanaka	Japan	24:21.6	2 (1+1)	+3:15.4
69	31	Federica Sanfilippo	Italy	24:30.1	3 (2+1)	+3:23.9
70	40	Tang Jialin	China	24:30.3	3 (1+2)	+3:24.1
71	73	Alina Raikova	Kazakhstan	24:33.8	3 (0+3)	+3:27.6
72	37	Daniela Kadeva	Bulgaria	24:39.2	3 (2+1)	+3:33.0
73	42	Iryna Varvynets	Ukraine	24:48.1	5 (1+4)	+3:41.9
74	66	Ivona Fialková	Slovakia	24:48.6	5 (2+3)	+3:42.4
75	56	Urška Poje	Slovenia	24:52.8	4 (0+4)	+3:46.6
76	65	Desislava Stoyanova	Bulgaria	24:54.3	5 (2+3)	+3:48.1
77	41	Laura Toivanen	Finland	24:55.4	1 (0+1)	+3:49.2
78	84	Ko Eun-jung	South Korea	25:12.1	2 (1+1)	+4:05.9
79	60	Venla Lehtonen	Finland	25:13.7	3 (3+0)	+4:07.5
80	54	Natalija Kočergina	Lithuania	25:16.2	5 (1+4)	+4:10.0
81	32	Éva Tófalvi	Romania	25:20.0	4 (2+2)	+4:13.8
82	20	Mun Ji-hee	South Korea	25:26.6	6 (2+4)	+4:20.4
83	79	Terézia Poliaková	Slovakia	25:32.2	5 (1+4)	+4:26.0
84	85	Milena Todorova	Bulgaria	25:33.6	2 (1+1)	+4:27.4
85	74	Rina Mitsuhashi	Japan	25:53.1	5 (3+2)	+4:46.9
86	64	Joanne Reid	United States	26:18.8	7 (4+3)	+5:12.6
87	63	Ekaterina Avvakumova	South Korea	26:24.9	6 (3+3)	+5:18.7
