= Alpine skiing at the 2018 Winter Olympics – Women's downhill =

Women's downhill at the XXIII Olympic Winter Games
- Alpine skiing
- Venue: Jeongseon Alpine Centre, Gangwon Province, South Korea
- Date: 21 February 2018
- Competitors: 39 from 20 nations
- Winning time: 1:39.22

Medalists
1st place, gold medalist(s)		Sofia Goggia	Italy
2nd place, silver medalist(s)		Ragnhild Mowinckel	Norway
3rd place, bronze medalist(s)		Lindsey Vonn	United States

Women's Downhill
- Location: Jeongseon Alpine Centre
- Vertical: 730 m (2,395 ft)
- Top elevation: 1,275 m (4,183 ft)
- Base elevation: 545 m (1,788 ft)

The women's downhill competition of the PyeongChang 2018 Olympics was held at the Jeongseon Alpine Centre in PyeongChang on Wednesday, 21 February.

Italy's Sofia Goggia won the gold medal, Ragnhild Mowinckel of Norway took the silver, and the bronze medalist was Lindsey Vonn of the United States.

The race course was 2.775 km (1.72 mi) in length, with a vertical drop of 730 m (2,395 ft) from a starting elevation of 1,275 m (4,183 ft) above sea level. Goggia's winning time of 99.22 seconds yielded an average speed of 100.685 km/h (62.6 mph) and an average vertical descent rate of 7.357 m/s (24.1 ft/s).

== Qualification ==
A total of up to 320 alpine skiers qualified across all eleven events. Athletes qualified for this event by having met the A qualification standard only, which meant having 80 or less FIS Points and being ranked in the top 500 in the Olympic FIS points list. The Points list takes into average the best results of athletes per discipline during the qualification period (1 July 2016 to 21 January 2018). Countries received additional quotas by having athletes ranked in the top 30 of the current World Cup season (two per gender maximum, overall across all events). After the distribution of B standard quotas (to nations competing only in the slalom and giant slalom events), the remaining quotas were distributed using the Olympic FIS Points list, with each athlete only counting once for qualification purposes. A country could only enter a maximum of four athletes for the event.

== Results ==
The race was started at 11:00 local time, (UTC+9). At the starting gate, the skies were mostly clear, the temperature was −8.5 °C (17 °F), and the snow condition was hard.

Rank	Bib	Name	Country	Time	Deficit
1st place, gold medalist(s)	5	Sofia Goggia	Italy	1:39.22	—
2nd place, silver medalist(s)	19	Ragnhild Mowinckel	Norway	1:39.31	+0.09
3rd place, bronze medalist(s)	7	Lindsey Vonn	United States	1:39.69	+0.47
4	3	Tina Weirather	Liechtenstein	1:39.85	+0.63
5	14	Alice McKennis	United States	1:40.24	+1.02
6	2	Corinne Suter	Switzerland	1:40.29	+1.07
7	8	Breezy Johnson	United States	1:40.34	+1.12
8	13	Michelle Gisin	Switzerland	1:40.55	+1.33
9	15	Viktoria Rebensburg	Germany	1:40.64	+1.42
10	12	Ramona Siebenhofer	Austria	1:40.98	+1.76
11	6	Kira Weidle	Germany	1:41.01	+1.79
12	17	Nicole Schmidhofer	Austria	1:41.02	+1.80
13	4	Tiffany Gauthier	France	1:41.04	+1.82
13	1	Cornelia Hütter	Austria	1:41.04	+1.82
15	10	Laurenne Ross	United States	1:41.10	+1.88
16	23	Jennifer Piot	France	1:41.17	+1.95
17	30	Lisa Hörnblad	Sweden	1:41.63	+2.41
18	29	Romane Miradoli	France	1:41.64	+2.42
19	24	Maruša Ferk	Slovenia	1:42.00	+2.78
20	26	Greta Small	Australia	1:42.07	+2.85
21	22	Valérie Grenier	Canada	1:42.13	+2.91
22	25	Laura Gauché	France	1:42.29	+3.07
23	27	Roni Remme	Canada	1:42.80	+3.58
24	34	Maryna Gąsienica-Daniel	Poland	1:43.30	+4.08
25	35	Noelle Barahona	Chile	1:44.24	+5.02
26	32	Kateřina Pauláthová	Czech Republic	1:44.69	+5.47
27	28	Alexandra Coletti	Monaco	1:45.04	+5.82
28	36	Ania Monica Caill	Romania	1:45.06	+5.84
29	37	Barbara Kantorová	Slovakia	1:45.99	+6.77
30	38	Kim Vanreusel	Belgium	1:46.51	+7.29
31	39	Elvedina Muzaferija	Bosnia and Herzegovina	1:46.80	+7.58
	9	Lara Gut	Switzerland	DNF	
	11	Stephanie Venier	Austria	DNF	
	16	Nadia Fanchini	Italy	DNF	
	18	Federica Brignone	Italy	DNF	
	20	Jasmine Flury	Switzerland	DNF	
	21	Nicol Delago	Italy	DNF	
	31	Petra Vlhová	Slovakia	DNF	
	33	Candace Crawford	Canada	DNF	
