= Alpine skiing at the 2018 Winter Olympics – Women's combined =

Women's combined at the XXIII Olympic Winter Games
- Alpine skiing
- Venue: Jeongseon Alpine Centre, Gangwon Province, South Korea; Yongpyong Alpine Centre, Pyeongchang, South Korea
- Date: 22 February 2018
- Competitors: 28 from 16 nations
- Winning time: 2:20.90

Medalists
1st place, gold medalist(s)		Michelle Gisin	Switzerland
2nd place, silver medalist(s)		Mikaela Shiffrin	United States
3rd place, bronze medalist(s)		Wendy Holdener	Switzerland

The women's combined competition of the PyeongChang 2018 Olympics was held on 22 February 2018 at the Jeongseon Alpine Centre and the Yongpyong Alpine Centre at the Alpensia Sports Park in PyeongChang.

== Qualification ==
A total of up to 320 alpine skiers qualified across all eleven events. Athletes qualified for this event by having met the A qualification standard only, which meant having 140 or less FIS Points and being ranked in the top 500 in the Olympic FIS points list. The Points list takes into average the best results of athletes per discipline during the qualification period (1 July 2016 to 21 January 2018). Athletes were also required to have 80 or less FIS points in the downhill. Countries received additional quotas by having athletes ranked in the top 30 of the 2017–18 FIS Alpine Ski World Cup (two per gender maximum, overall across all events). After the distribution of B standard quotas (to nations competing only in the slalom and giant slalom events), the remaining quotas were distributed using the Olympic FIS Points list, with each athlete only counting once for qualification purposes. A country could only enter a maximum of four athletes for the event.

== Results ==
The downhill race started at 11:30 and the slalom race at 15:00.

Rank	Bib	Name	Nation	Downhill	Rank	Slalom	Rank	Total	Behind
1st place, gold medalist(s)	1	Michelle Gisin	Switzerland	1:40.14	3	40.76	4	2:20.90	—
2nd place, silver medalist(s)	19	Mikaela Shiffrin	United States	1:41.35	6	40.52	3	2:21.87	+0.97
3rd place, bronze medalist(s)	3	Wendy Holdener	Switzerland	1:42.11	10	40.23	1	2:22.34	+1.44
4	6	Ragnhild Mowinckel	Norway	1:40.11	2	42.52	11	2:22.63	+1.73
5	2	Petra Vlhová	Slovakia	1:42.58	13	40.41	2	2:22.99	+2.09
6	18	Valérie Grenier	Canada	1:41.79	8	41.65	8	2:23.44	+2.54
7	15	Ramona Siebenhofer	Austria	1:40.34	4	43.11	15	2:23.45	+2.55
8	5	Federica Brignone	Italy	1:42.51	12	41.02	6	2:23.53	+2.63
9	11	Denise Feierabend	Switzerland	1:43.04	17	40.90	5	2:23.94	+3.04
10	7	Marta Bassino	Italy	1:42.61	14	41.63	7	2:24.24	+3.34
11	20	Ana Bucik	Slovenia	1:42.77	15	41.99	9	2:24.76	+3.86
12	10	Laura Gauché	France	1:42.15	11	42.64	12	2:24.79	+3.89
13	12	Ricarda Haaser	Austria	1:41.75	7	43.06	14	2:24.81	+3.91
14	8	Nevena Ignjatović	Serbia	1:42.88	16	42.23	10	2:25.11	+4.21
15	24	Alice Merryweather	United States	1:43.17	18	43.73	16	2:26.90	+6.00
16	26	Maryna Gąsienica-Daniel	Poland	1:44.35	19	42.84	13	2:27.19	+6.29
17	30	Kateřina Pauláthová	Czech Republic	1:44.83	20	44.26	17	2:29.09	+8.19
18	27	Barbara Kantorová	Slovakia	1:45.58	21	44.36	18	2:29.94	+9.04
	4	Romane Miradoli	France	1:41.83	9	DNF	—N/a		
	13	Lindsey Vonn	United States	1:39.37	1	DNF	—N/a		
	23	Elvedina Muzaferija	Bosnia and Herzegovina	1:46.62	22	DNF	—N/a		
	9	Maruša Ferk	Slovenia	1:40.98	5	DSQ	—N/a		
	22	Johanna Schnarf	Italy	DNF	—N/a				
	25	Greta Small	Australia	DNF	—N/a				
	28	Candace Crawford	Canada	DNF	—N/a				
	29	Kim Vanreusel	Belgium	DNF	—N/a				
	31	Noelle Barahona	Chile	DNF	—N/a				
	32	Roni Remme	Canada	DNF	—N/a				
	14	Stephanie Venier	Austria	DNS	—N/a				
	16	Sofia Goggia	Italy	DNS	—N/a				
	17	Anne-Sophie Barthet	France	DNS	—N/a				
	21	Alexandra Coletti	Monaco	DNS	—N/a				
