= Biathlon World Championships 2021 – Men's sprint =

Men's sprint at the Biathlon World Championships 2021
- Location: Pokljuka, Slovenia
- Date: 12 February
- Competitors: 104 from 35 nations
- Winning time: 24:41.1

Medalists
gold medal	Martin Ponsiluoma	Sweden
silver medal	Simon Desthieux	France
bronze medal	Émilien Jacquelin	France

The Men's sprint competition at the Biathlon World Championships 2021 was held on 12 February 2021 at 14:30 local time.

== Results ==
Rank	Bib	Name	Nationality	Penalties (P+S)	Time	Deficit
1st place, gold medalist(s)	6	Martin Ponsiluoma	Sweden	0 (0+0)	24:41.1	—
2nd place, silver medalist(s)	62	Simon Desthieux	France	0 (0+0)	24:52.3	+11.2
3rd place, bronze medalist(s)	33	Émilien Jacquelin	France	1 (1+0)	24:54.0	+12.9
4	59	Johannes Dale	Norway	1 (0+1)	25:03.5	+22.4
5	28	Johannes Thingnes Bø	Norway	2 (2+0)	25:03.6	+22.5
6	16	Quentin Fillon Maillet	France	1 (1+0)	25:05.0	+23.9
7	9	Sturla Holm Lægreid	Norway	0 (0+0)	25:06.8	+25.7
8	26	Sebastian Samuelsson	Sweden	1 (0+1)	25:07.8	+26.7
9	13	Tarjei Bø	Norway	1 (0+1)	25:09.3	+28.2
10	50	Eduard Latypov	RBU	1 (0+1)	25:14.4	+33.3
11	52	Michal Krčmář	Czech Republic	0 (0+0)	25:18.8	+37.7
12	24	Jake Brown	United States	0 (0+0)	25:25.9	+44.8
13	2	Lukas Hofer	Italy	1 (0+1)	25:28.7	+47.6
14	89	Antonin Guigonnat	France	1 (0+1)	25:30.1	+49.0
15	21	Andrejs Rastorgujevs	Latvia	1 (0+1)	25:35.0	+53.9
16	20	Simon Eder	Austria	0 (0+0)	25:37.5	+56.4
17	48	Christian Gow	Canada	0 (0+0)	25:39.0	+57.9
18	22	Jesper Nelin	Sweden	1 (0+1)	25:41.2	+1:00.1
19	4	Matvey Eliseev	RBU	0 (0+0)	25:42.7	+1:01.6
20	93	Artem Pryma	Ukraine	1 (1+0)	25:42.9	+1:01.8
21	37	Didier Bionaz	Italy	0 (0+0)	25:44.1	+1:03.0
22	5	Florent Claude	Belgium	0 (0+0)	25:45.5	+1:04.4
23	46	Dmytro Pidruchnyi	Ukraine	2 (1+1)	25:46.1	+1:05.0
24	103	Maksim Varabei	Belarus	1 (0+1)	25:51.8	+1:10.7
25	15	Miha Dovžan	Slovenia	0 (0+0)	25:56.0	+1:14.9
26	12	Alexander Loginov	RBU	2 (1+1)	25:56.1	+1:15.0
27	87	Thomas Bormolini	Italy	1 (0+1)	25:58.8	+1:17.7
28	32	Tero Seppälä	Finland	2 (0+2)	26:00.2	+1:19.1
29	39	Olli Hiidensalo	Finland	1 (1+0)	26:00.7	+1:19.6
30	97	Bogdan Tsymbal	Ukraine	0 (0+0)	26:01.5	+1:20.4
31	64	Peppe Femling	Sweden	1 (0+1)	26:02.0	+1:20.9
32	36	Sergey Bocharnikov	Belarus	1 (0+1)	26:08.0	+1:26.9
33	66	Anton Smolski	Belarus	2 (2+0)	26:15.6	+1:34.5
34	10	Dominik Windisch	Italy	3 (1+2)	26:16.6	+1:35.5
35	23	Jakov Fak	Slovenia	2 (1+1)	26:18.1	+1:37.0
36	18	Arnd Peiffer	Germany	2 (0+2)	26:18.3	+1:37.2
37	27	Michal Šíma	Slovakia	0 (0+0)	26:21.4	+1:40.3
38	98	David Komatz	Austria	1 (0+1)	26:24.1	+1:43.0
39	31	Benedikt Doll	Germany	4 (2+2)	26:24.8	+1:43.7
40	14	Karol Dombrovski	Lithuania	1 (0+1)	26:26.5	+1:45.4
41	35	Fabien Claude	France	3 (1+2)	26:27.1	+1:46.0
42	30	Mihail Usov	Moldova	1 (0+1)	26:29.0	+1:47.9
43	61	Rene Zahkna	Estonia	0 (0+0)	26:29.3	+1:48.2
44	88	Martin Jäger	Switzerland	2 (0+2)	26:30.4	+1:49.3
45	70	Johannes Kühn	Germany	4 (0+4)	26:38.4	+1:57.3
46	83	Leif Nordgren	United States	1 (0+1)	26:40.2	+1:59.1
47	81	Tuomas Harjula	Finland	1 (1+0)	26:40.6	+1:59.5
48	95	Trevor Kiers	Canada	1 (1+0)	26:41.2	+2:00.1
49	63	Dimitar Gerdzhikov	Bulgaria	1 (1+0)	26:41.3	+2:00.2
50	100	Niklas Hartweg	Switzerland	2 (1+1)	26:42.6	+2:01.5
51	56	Rok Tršan	Slovenia	0 (0+0)	26:43.4	+2:02.3
52	54	Felix Leitner	Austria	3 (1+2)	26:44.2	+2:03.1
53	76	Anton Babikov	RBU	1 (0+1)	26:47.5	+2:06.4
54	91	Klemen Bauer	Slovenia	1 (1+0)	26:47.9	+2:06.8
55	73	Ondřej Moravec	Czech Republic	1 (0+1)	26:49.1	+2:08.0
56	86	Adam Runnalls	Canada	2 (0+2)	26:49.3	+2:08.2
57	29	Vladimir Iliev	Bulgaria	3 (3+0)	26:52.3	+2:11.2
59	34	Tsukasa Kobonoki	Japan	1 (0+1)	26:55.5	+2:14.4
59	55	Thierry Langer	Belgium	3 (0+3)	26:55.6	+2:14.5
60	44	George Buta	Romania	1 (1+0)	26:56.5	+2:15.4
61	60	Krešimir Crnković	Croatia	1 (1+0)	26:56.6	+2:15.5
62	11	Benjamin Weger	Switzerland	3 (2+1)	26:57.1	+2:16.0
63	43	Vytautas Strolia	Lithuania	3 (1+2)	26:58.9	+2:17.8
64	96	Said Karimulla Khalili	RBU	2 (2+0)	27:00.1	+2:19.0
65	8	Grzegorz Guzik	Poland	2 (2+0)	27:01.2	+2:20.1
66	41	Erik Lesser	Germany	2 (0+2)	27:02.7	+2:21.6
67	78	Julian Eberhard	Austria	4 (1+3)	27:04.7	+2:23.6
68	19	Jakub Štvrtecký	Czech Republic	3 (1+2)	27:08.3	+2:27.2
69	69	Tomáš Hasilla	Slovakia	2 (0+2)	27:10.4	+2:29.3
70	80	Vladislav Kireyev	Kazakhstan	0 (0+0)	27:11.5	+2:30.4
71	75	Anton Sinapov	Bulgaria	3 (2+1)	27:21.2	+2:40.1
72	101	Paul Schommer	United States	2 (2+0)	27:22.6	+2:41.5
73	57	Jeremy Finello	Switzerland	4 (1+3)	27:22.9	+2:41.8
74	51	Pavel Magazeev	Moldova	1 (1+0)	27:25.3	+2:44.2
75	49	Campbell Wright	New Zealand	3 (1+2)	27:26.9	+2:45.8
76	82	Tomas Kaukenas	Lithuania	3 (1+2)	27:30.1	+2:49.0
77	3	Scott Gow	Canada	5 (3+2)	27:38.2	+2:57.1
78	7	Anton Dudchenko	Ukraine	3 (2+1)	27:38.8	+2:57.7
79	68	Sean Doherty	United States	4 (2+2)	27:42.9	+3:01.8
80	74	Šimon Bartko	Slovakia	4 (3+1)	27:47.5	+3:06.4
81	25	Alexandr Mukhin	Kazakhstan	3 (2+1)	27:49.6	+3:08.5
82	84	Antonio Flore	Romania	2 (2+0)	27:55.2	+3:14.1
83	42	Kosuke Ozaki	Japan	3 (1+2)	27:55.8	+3:14.7
84	102	Mikuláš Karlík	Czech Republic	5 (2+3)	28:04.1	+3:23.0
85	17	Cornel Puchianu	Romania	4 (1+3)	28:08.1	+3:27.0
86	92	Dzmitry Lazouski	Belarus	1 (0+1)	28:13.3	+3:32.2
87	104	Danil Beletskiy	Kazakhstan	1 (0+1)	28:14.7	+3:33.6
88	40	Andrzej Nędza-Kubiniec	Poland	3 (1+2)	28:17.5	+3:36.4
89	53	Edgars Mise	Latvia	3 (2+1)	28:19.7	+3:38.6
90	90	Raido Ränkel	Estonia	4 (2+2)	28:21.9	+3:40.8
91	71	Damir Rastić	Serbia	2 (0+2)	28:22.0	+3:40.9
92	1	Kalev Ermits	Estonia	3 (1+2)	28:22.4	+3:41.3
93	99	Blagoy Todev	Bulgaria	3 (0+3)	28:23.0	+3:41.9
94	94	Tom Lahaye-Goffart	Belgium	3 (1+2)	28:56.6	+4:15.5
95	85	Roberts Slotiņš	Latvia	4 (3+1)	28:59.5	+4:18.4
96	47	Kim Yong-gyu	South Korea	2 (1+1)	29:06.4	+4:25.3
97	79	Kim Sang-rea	South Korea	0 (0+0)	29:42.1	+5:01.0
98	38	Apostolos Angelis	Greece	4 (2+2)	29:45.0	+5:03.9
99	72	Marcin Szwajnos	Poland	4 (1+3)	29:49.7	+5:08.6
100	65	Vinny Fountain	Great Britain	4 (1+3)	29:51.8	+5:10.7
101	45	Roberto Piqueras	Spain	4 (2+2)	30:09.7	+5:28.6
102	77	Nikolaos Tsourekas	Greece	3 (1+2)	30:46.5	+6:05.4
103	67	Soma Gyallai	Hungary	6 (3+3)	32:23.2	+7:42.1
104	58	Stavre Jada	North Macedonia	3 (3+0)	32:56.5	+8:15.4
