= Biathlon at the 2018 Winter Olympics – Mixed relay =

Mixed relay at the XXIII Olympic Winter Games
- Pictogram for biathlon
- Venue: Alpensia Biathlon Centre in Pyeongchang, South Korea
- Date: 20 February 2018
- Competitors: 80 from 20 nations
- Winning time: 1:08:34.3

Medalists
1st place, gold medalist(s)		Marie Dorin Habert; Anaïs Bescond; Simon Desthieux; Martin Fourcade	France
2nd place, silver medalist(s)		Marte Olsbu; Tiril Eckhoff; Johannes Thingnes Bø; Emil Hegle Svendsen	Norway
3rd place, bronze medalist(s)		Lisa Vittozzi; Dorothea Wierer; Lukas Hofer; Dominik Windisch	Italy

The mixed relay biathlon competition of the Pyeongchang 2018 Olympics was held on 20 February 2018 at the Alpensia Biathlon Centre in Pyeongchang, South Korea.

== Schedule ==
All times are (UTC+9).

Date	Time	Round
20 February	20:15	Final

== Results ==
The race was started at 20:15.

Rank	Bib	Country	Time	Penalties (P+S)	Deficit
1st place, gold medalist(s)	7	France Marie Dorin Habert; Anaïs Bescond; Simon Desthieux; Martin Fourcade	1:08:34.3; 15:51.1; 16:46.4; 17:58.4; 17:58.4	0+1 0+3; 0+0 0+0; 0+1 0+3; 0+0 0+0; 0+0 0+0	–
2nd place, silver medalist(s)	1	Norway Marte Olsbu; Tiril Eckhoff; Johannes Thingnes Bø; Emil Hegle Svendsen	1:08:55.2; 16:16.9; 16:55.1; 17:24.4; 18:18.8	0+5 1+6; 0+2 0+1; 0+2 1+3; 0+0 0+1; 0+1 0+1	+20.9
3rd place, bronze medalist(s)	2	Italy Lisa Vittozzi; Dorothea Wierer; Lukas Hofer; Dominik Windisch	1:09:01.2; 15:44.1; 16:34.4; 18:17.4; 18:25.3	0+1 0+6; 0+0 0+0; 0+0 0+3; 0+0 0+1; 0+1 0+2	+26.9
4	3	Germany Vanessa Hinz; Laura Dahlmeier; Erik Lesser; Arnd Peiffer	1:09:01.5; 15:46.3; 16:02.3; 18:14.7; 18:58.2	0+2 1+5; 0+0 0+0; 0+0 0+1; 0+0 0+1; 0+2 1+3	+27.2
5	11	Belarus Nadezhda Skardino; Darya Domracheva; Sergey Bocharnikov; Vladimir Chepelin	1:09:29.8; 16:10.7; 16:10.5; 18:29.8; 18:38.8	0+2 0+1; 0+0 0+0; 0+0 0+1; 0+1 0+0; 0+1 0+0	+55.5
6	8	Finland Laura Toivanen; Kaisa Mäkäräinen; Tero Seppälä; Olli Hiidensalo	1:09:38.2; 16:46.6; 16:01.2; 18:30.6; 18:19.8	0+1 0+2; 0+0 0+1; 0+0 0+0; 0+1 0+1; 0+0 0+0	+1:03.9
7	10	Ukraine Iryna Varvynets; Yuliia Dzhima; Dmytro Pidruchnyi; Artem Pryma	1:09:46.4; 16:18.6; 16:29.6; 18:22.9; 18:35.3	0+3 0+2; 0+1 0+0; 0+1 0+0; 0+1 0+1; 0+0 0+1	+1:12.1
8	13	Czech Republic Veronika Vítková; Markéta Davidová; Ondřej Moravec; Michal Krčmář	1:10:13.6; 16:07.4; 16:54.6; 18:24.4; 18:47.2	0+5 0+3; 0+2 0+1; 0+3 0+0; 0+0 0+1; 0+0 0+1	+1:39.3
9	6	Olympic Athletes from Russia Uliana Kaisheva; Tatiana Akimova; Anton Babikov; Matvey Eliseev	1:10:49.1; 16:20.9; 16:41.9; 18:16.9; 19:29.4	0+6 0+4; 0+2 0+1; 0+0 0+1; 0+1 0+1; 0+3 0+1	+2:14.8
10	18	Austria Lisa Hauser; Katharina Innerhofer; Simon Eder; Julian Eberhard	1:10:56.3; 16:53.8; 17:09.9; 18:11.5; 18:41.1	0+6 0+8; 0+1 0+3; 0+2 0+3; 0+1 0+0; 0+2 0+2	+2:22.0
11	5	Sweden Mona Brorsson; Hanna Öberg; Jesper Nelin; Fredrik Lindström	1:11:07.5; 17:37.5; 16:23.7; 18:29.5; 18:36.8	0+2 2+6; 0+0 2+3; 0+0 0+1; 0+2 0+1; 0+0 0+1	+2:33.2
12	15	Canada Rosanna Crawford; Julia Ransom; Brendan Green; Christian Gow	1:11:11.0; 16:18.8; 17:14.5; 18:57.9; 18:39.8	0+2 0+7; 0+1 0+1; 0+0 0+2; 0+1 0+2; 0+0 0+2	+2:36.7
13	9	Switzerland Elisa Gasparin; Lena Häcki; Benjamin Weger; Serafin Wiestner	1:11:31.4; 16:48.1; 17:21.8; 18:02.7; 19:18.8	1+6 0+7; 0+1 0+3; 1+3 0+2; 0+1 0+0; 0+1 0+2	+2:57.1
14	12	Slovenia Urška Poje; Anja Eržen; Klemen Bauer; Jakov Fak	1:11:55.6; 16:55.3; 17:59.5; 18:05.0; 18:55.8	0+0 1+7; 0+0 0+2; 0+0 1+3; 0+0 0+0; 0+0 0+2	+3:21.3
15	19	United States Susan Dunklee; Joanne Reid; Tim Burke; Lowell Bailey	1:12:05.4; 16:07.9; 18:50.7; 18:29.1; 18:37.7	0+3 3+6; 0+2 0+0; 0+0 3+3; 0+0 0+3; 0+1 0+0	+3:31.1
16	14	Poland Magdalena Gwizdoń; Kamila Żuk; Andrzej Nędza-Kubiniec; Grzegorz Guzik	1:12:17.9; 16:10.0; 16:38.8; 19:39.3; 19:49.8	0+4 0+4; 0+1 0+0; 0+0 0+2; 0+0 0+1; 0+3 0+1	+3:43.6
17	16	Bulgaria Emilia Yordanova; Daniela Kadeva; Krasimir Anev; Vladimir Iliev	1:12:31.7; 16:49.9; 17:46.0; 18:56.2; 18:59.6	0+7 0+4; 0+1 0+0; 0+2 0+1; 0+1 0+3; 0+3 0+0	+3:57.4
18	20	Kazakhstan Galina Vishnevskaya; Alina Raikova; Roman Yeremin; Maxim Braun	1:14:13.7; 16:09.1; 17:39.5; 20:12.0; 20:13.1	3+4 0+3; 0+0 0+1; 0+0 0+1; 3+3 0+0; 0+1 0+1	+5:39.4
19	17	Lithuania Natalija Kočergina; Diana Rasimovičiūtė; Tomas Kaukėnas; Vytautas Strolia	LAP; 18:16.3; LAP	0+4 1+3; 0+2 1+3; 0+2 0+0	
20	4	Slovakia Paulína Fialková; Anastasiya Kuzmina; Matej Kazár; Martin Otčenáš	LAP; 21:33.9; LAP	4+6 1+4; 4+3 1+3; 0+3 0+1	
