= Coraline Hugue =

French cross-country skier (born 1984)

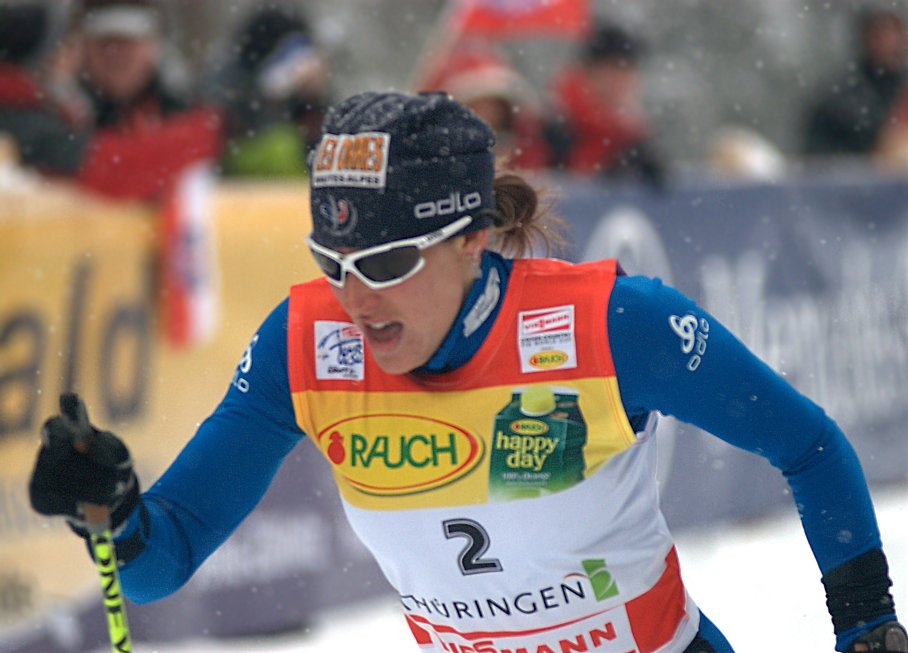
- Hugue in 2010

Personal information
- Full name: Coraline Thomas Hugue
- Nationality: France
- Born: 11 March 1984 (age 42) Embrun, France

Sport
- Sport: Skiing

World Cup career
- Seasons: 13 – (2005–2016, 2018)
- Indiv. starts: 126
- Indiv. podiums: 0
- Team starts: 12
- Team podiums: 0
- Overall titles: 0 – (39th in 2015)
- Discipline titles: 0
Medal record
Women's cross-country skiing
Representing France
U23 World Championships
Silver medal – second place	2005 Oberstdorf	15 km skiathlon
Silver medal – second place	2005 Oberstdorf	10 km freestyle
Silver medal – second place	2007 Tarvisio	15 km skiathlon

Coraline Hugue (born 11 March 1984), also known as Coraline Thomas Hugue, is a French former cross-country skier. She competed for France at the 2014 Winter Olympics in Sochi, in skiathlon and women's classical. She also competed for France at the 2018 Winter Olympics in Pyeongchang.

== Cross-country skiing results ==
All results are sourced from the International Ski Federation (FIS).

=== Olympic Games ===
Year	Age	10 km individual	15 km skiathlon	30 km mass start	Sprint	4 × 5 km relay	Team sprint
2014	29	—	21	7	—	4	—
2018	33	14	29	—	—	12	8

=== World Championships ===
Year	Age	10 km individual	15 km skiathlon	30 km mass start	Sprint	4 × 5 km relay	Team sprint
2009	24	—	34	14	—	8	—
2013	28	10	32	—	—	6	10
2015	30	12	—	—	—	8	6

=== World Cup ===
==== Season standings ====
Season	Age	Discipline standings			Ski Tour standings			
Season	Age	Overall	Distance	Sprint	Nordic Opening	Tour de Ski	World Cup Final	Ski Tour Canada
2005	20	NC	NC	—	—N/a	—N/a	—N/a	—N/a
2006	21	118	85	—	—N/a	—N/a	—N/a	—N/a
2007	22	NC	NC	NC	—N/a	DNF	—N/a	—N/a
2008	23	60	35	NC	—N/a	—	24	—N/a
2009	24	55	38	NC	—N/a	—	27	—N/a
2010	25	112	91	NC	—N/a	40	—	—N/a
2011	26	NC	NC	—	—	—	—	—N/a
2012	27	84	62	NC	46	45	—	—N/a
2013	28	48	33	NC	50	29	36	—N/a
2014	29	53	34	70	39	26	—	—N/a
2015	30	39	31	NC	45	18	—N/a	—N/a
2016	31	80	55	NC	—	DNF	—N/a	—
2018	33	66	43	NC	—	DNF	38	—N/a
