= Italy at the 2018 Winter Olympics =

- Flag of Italy
- IOC code: ITA
- NOC: Italian National Olympic Committee
- Website: www.coni.it/en

in Pyeongchang, South Korea 9–25 February 2018
- Competitors: 120 (71 men and 49 women) in 14 sports
- Flag bearer: Arianna Fontana
- Medals Ranked 12th: Gold 3 Silver 2 Bronze 5 Total 10

Winter Olympics appearances (overview)
- 1924; 1928; 1932; 1936; 1948; 1952; 1956; 1960; 1964; 1968; 1972; 1976; 1980; 1984; 1988; 1992; 1994; 1998; 2002; 2006; 2010; 2014; 2018; 2022; 2026

Italy competed at the 2018 Winter Olympics in Pyeongchang, South Korea, from 9 to 25 February 2018, with 120 competitors in 14 sports. They won ten medals in total, three gold, two silver and five bronze, ranking 12th in the medal table. Short-track speed skater Arianna Fontana, who was also the flag bearer at the opening ceremony, was the country's most successful athlete, having won three medals, one of each color.

== Medalists ==
Medal	Name	Sport	Event	Date
Gold	Arianna Fontana	Short track speed skating	Women's 500 metres	13 February
Gold	Michela Moioli	Snowboarding	Women's snowboard cross	16 February
Gold	Sofia Goggia	Alpine skiing	Women's downhill	21 February
Silver	Federico Pellegrino	Cross-country skiing	Men's sprint	13 February
Silver	Arianna Fontana; Lucia Peretti; Cecilia Maffei; Martina Valcepina	Short track speed skating	Women's 3000 metre relay	20 February
Bronze	Dominik Windisch	Biathlon	Men's sprint	11 February
Bronze	Federica Brignone	Alpine skiing	Women's giant slalom	15 February
Bronze	Nicola Tumolero	Speed skating	Men's 10000 meters	15 February
Bronze	Lisa Vittozzi; Dorothea Wierer; Lukas Hofer; Dominik Windisch	Biathlon	Mixed relay	20 February
Bronze	Arianna Fontana	Short track speed skating	Women's 1000 metres	22 February

Medals by sport
Sport	1st place, gold medalist(s)	2nd place, silver medalist(s)	3rd place, bronze medalist(s)	Total
Alpine skiing	1	0	1	2
Biathlon	0	0	2	2
Cross-country skiing	0	1	0	1
Short track	1	1	1	3
Snowboarding	1	0	0	1
Speed skating	0	0	1	1
Total	3	2	5	10

Medals by date
Day	Date	1st place, gold medalist(s)	2nd place, silver medalist(s)	3rd place, bronze medalist(s)	Total
Day 1	February 10	0	0	0	0
Day 2	February 11	0	0	1	1
Day 3	February 12	0	0	0	0
Day 4	February 13	1	1	0	2
Day 5	February 14	0	0	0	0
Day 6	February 15	0	0	2	2
Day 7	February 16	1	0	0	1
Day 8	February 17	0	0	0	0
Day 9	February 18	0	0	0	0
Day 10	February 19	0	0	0	0
Day 11	February 20	0	1	1	2
Day 12	February 21	1	0	0	1
Day 13	February 22	0	0	1	1
Day 14	February 23	0	0	0	0
Total		3	2	5	10

Medals by gender
Gender	1st place, gold medalist(s)	2nd place, silver medalist(s)	3rd place, bronze medalist(s)	Total
Male	0	1	2	3
Female	3	1	2	6
Mixed	0	0	1	1
Total	3	2	5	10

== Competitors ==
The following is the list of number of competitors participating at the Games per sport/discipline.

Sport	Men	Women	Total
Alpine skiing	11	9	20
Biathlon	5	6	11
Bobsleigh	4	0	4
Cross-country skiing	8	7	15
Curling	5	0	5
Figure skating	5	6	11
Freestyle skiing	2	2	4
Luge	7	2	9
Nordic combined	4	0	4
Short track speed skating	2	5	7
Skeleton	1	0	1
Ski jumping	4	4	8
Snowboarding	9	3	12
Speed skating	6	3	9
Total	71	49	120

== Alpine skiing ==
Men

Athlete	Event	Run 1		Run 2		Total	
Athlete	Event	Time	Rank	Time	Rank	Time	Rank
Emanuele Buzzi	Downhill	—N/a				1:42.84	22
Luca De Aliprandini	Giant slalom	DSQ					
Florian Eisath	Giant slalom	1:10.46	17	1:10.72	18	2:21.18	14
Peter Fill	Downhill	—N/a				1:41.08	6
Peter Fill	Super-G	—N/a				DNF	
Peter Fill	Combined	1:19.92	6	DNF			
Stefano Gross	Slalom	49.27	14	51.44	16	1:40.71	16
Christof Innerhofer	Downhill	—N/a				1:42.23	17
Christof Innerhofer	Super-G	—N/a				1:25.90	16
Christof Innerhofer	Combined	1:19.77	5	49.98	25	2:09.75	14
Matteo Marsaglia	Super-G	—N/a				1:26.11	20
Manfred Mölgg	Giant slalom	1:10.03	15	1:11.01	21	2:21.04	13
Manfred Mölgg	Slalom	48.40	4	51.84	23	1:40.24	12
Dominik Paris	Downhill	—N/a				1:40.79	4
Dominik Paris	Super-G	—N/a				1:25.18	7
Dominik Paris	Combined	1:20.01	8	DNF			
Riccardo Tonetti	Combined	1:21.99	38	48.22	12	2:09.75	18
Riccardo Tonetti	Giant slalom	1:09.02	4	DNF			
Riccardo Tonetti	Slalom	DNF					
Alex Vinatzer	Slalom	DNF					

Women

Athlete	Event	Run 1		Run 2		Total	
Athlete	Event	Time	Rank	Time	Rank	Time	Rank
Marta Bassino	Combined	1:42.61	14	41.63	7	2:24.24	10
Marta Bassino	Giant slalom	1:11.19	5	1:09.50	7	2:20.69	5
Marta Bassino	Slalom	DNF					
Federica Brignone	Downhill	—N/a				DNF	
Federica Brignone	Super-G	—N/a				1:21.49	=6
Federica Brignone	Combined	1:42.51	12	41.02	6	2:23.53	8
Federica Brignone	Giant slalom	1:10.91	3	1:09.57	8	2:20.48	3rd place, bronze medalist(s)
Chiara Costazza	Slalom	49.83	7	50.77	17	1:40.60	9
Irene Curtoni	Slalom	51.15	14	49.89	7	1:41.04	10
Nicol Delago	Downhill	—N/a				DNF	
Nadia Fanchini	Downhill	—N/a				DNF	
Nadia Fanchini	Super-G	—N/a				1:21.88	12
Sofia Goggia	Downhill	—N/a				1:39.22	1st place, gold medalist(s)
Sofia Goggia	Super-G	—N/a				1:21.65	11
Sofia Goggia	Combined	DNF					
Sofia Goggia	Giant slalom	1:11.64	10	1:10.16	18	2:21.80	11
Manuela Mölgg	Giant slalom	1:10.62	1	1:10.58	23	2:21.20	8
Manuela Mölgg	Slalom	51.40	17	51.35	25	1:42.75	23
Johanna Schnarf	Super-G	—N/a				1:21.27	5
Johanna Schnarf	Combined	DNF					

Mixed

Athlete	Event	Round of 16	Quarterfinals	Semifinals	Final / BM	
Athlete	Event	Opposition Result	Opposition Result	Opposition Result	Opposition Result	Rank
Stefano Gross; Riccardo Tonetti; Alex Vinatzer; Federica Brignone; Chiara Costazza; Irene Curtoni	Team	Czech Republic; W 3–1	France; L 1–3	did not advance		

== Biathlon ==
Based on their Nations Cup rankings in the 2016–17 Biathlon World Cup, Italy has qualified a team of 5 men and 6 women.

Men

Athlete	Event	Time	Misses	Rank
Thomas Bormolini	Sprint	25:39.3	2 (1+1)	51
Thomas Bormolini	Pursuit	38:10.7	6 (1+0+4+1)	48
Thomas Bormolini	Individual	53:26.6	4 (0+1+2+1)	56
Lukas Hofer	Sprint	24:09.8	2 (1+1)	10
Lukas Hofer	Pursuit	34:24.4	3 (1+1+1+0)	10
Lukas Hofer	Individual	53:54.1	5 (1+2+1+1)	63
Lukas Hofer	Mass start	37:07.7	4 (1+1+0+2)	18
Giuseppe Montello	Sprint	25:35.3	2 (0+2)	50
Giuseppe Montello	Pursuit	37:21.7	3 (0+0+2+1)	39
Giuseppe Montello	Individual	52:01.9	3 (1+1+0+1)	40
Dominik Windisch	Sprint	23:46.5	1 (0+1)	3rd place, bronze medalist(s)
Dominik Windisch	Pursuit	34:57.9	5 (2+0+0+3)	16
Dominik Windisch	Individual	52:54.3	5 (2+0+3+0)	50
Dominik Windisch	Mass start	37:07.7	4 (0+1+2+1)	17
Thomas Bormolini; Lukas Hofer; Giuseppe Montello; Dominik Windisch	Team relay	1:21:35.6	20 (6+14)	12

Women

Athlete	Event	Time	Misses	Rank
Nicole Gontier	Sprint	23:20.0	3 (2+1)	44
Nicole Gontier	Pursuit	35:37.6	7 (3+1+1+2)	48
Nicole Gontier	Individual	45:32.5	4 (1+1+1+1)	38
Alexia Runggaldier	Individual	45:15.0	2 (0+0+1+1)	33
Federica Sanfilippo	Sprint	24:30.1	3 (2+1)	69
Lisa Vittozzi	Sprint	21:46.7	1 (0+1)	6
Lisa Vittozzi	Pursuit	32:34.6	4 (1+2+0+1)	11
Lisa Vittozzi	Individual	45:11.8	3 (0+2+0+1)	32
Lisa Vittozzi	Mass start	36:08.6	2 (1+0+0+1)	4
Dorothea Wierer	Sprint	22:20.3	2 (0+2)	18
Dorothea Wierer	Pursuit	32:48.4	5 (2+2+1+0)	15
Dorothea Wierer	Individual	43:15.8	2 (0+1+0+1)	7
Dorothea Wierer	Mass start	36:10.3	1 (0+0+0+1)	6
Nicole Gontier; Federica Sanfilippo; Lisa Vittozzi; Dorothea Wierer	Team relay	1:13:07.5	17 (9+8)	9

Mixed

Athlete	Event	Time	Misses	Rank
Lukas Hofer; Dominik Windisch; Lisa Vittozzi; Dorothea Wierer	Team relay	1:09:01.2	7 (0+7)	3rd place, bronze medalist(s)

== Bobsleigh ==
Based on their rankings in the 2017–18 Bobsleigh World Cup, Italy has qualified 1 sled.

Athlete	Event	Run 1		Run 2		Run 3		Run 4		Total	
Athlete	Event	Time	Rank	Time	Rank	Time	Rank	Time	Rank	Time	Rank
Simone Bertazzo*; Lorenzo Bilotti; Simone Fontana; Mattia Variola	Four-man	49.92	27	49.94	=24	50.02	24	Eliminated		2:29.88	27

* – Denotes the driver of each sled

== Cross-country skiing ==
Italy has qualified 15 athletes, 8 men and 7 women.

Distance
Men

Athlete	Event	Classical		Freestyle		Total		
Athlete	Event	Time	Rank	Time	Rank	Time	Deficit	Rank
Mirco Bertolina	15 km freestyle	—N/a				36:33.5	+2:49.6	44
Francesco de Fabiani	30 km skiathlon	41:11.4	22	36:13.5	20	1:17:54.9	+1:34.9	20
Francesco de Fabiani	50 km classical	—N/a				2:17:14.3	+8:52.2	22
Dietmar Nöckler	15 km freestyle	—N/a				DNF		
Dietmar Nöckler	30 km skiathlon	41:15.2	28	38:05.5	40	1:19:55.5	+3:35.5	37
Dietmar Nöckler	50 km classical	—N/a				2:16:29.2	+8:07.1	21
Sergio Rigoni	15 km freestyle	—N/a				38:03.0	+4:19.1	72
Sergio Rigoni	30 km skiathlon	42:41.7	46	39:40.6	57	1:22:54.9	+6:34.9	48
Maicol Rastelli	50 km classical	—N/a				2:15:10.0	+6:47.9	19
Giandomenico Salvadori	30 km skiathlon	40:47.8	16	37:20.9	36	1:18:36.9	+2:16.9	26
Giandomenico Salvadori	50 km classical	—N/a				2:13:45.4	+5:23.3	16
Stefan Zelger	15 km freestyle	—N/a				37:27.9	+3:44.0	60
Francesco de Fabiani; Federico Pellegrino; Maicol Rastelli; Giandomenico Salvadori	4 × 10 km relay	—N/a				1:35:40.1	+2:35.2	7

Women

Athlete	Event	Classical		Freestyle		Total		
Athlete	Event	Time	Rank	Time	Rank	Time	Deficit	Rank
Elisa Brocard	10 km freestyle	—N/a				27:34.8	+2:34.3	29
Elisa Brocard	15 km skiathlon	22:34.5	27	20:12.8	21	43:17.6	+2:32.7	26
Elisa Brocard	30 km classical	—N/a				1:33:33.5	+11:15.9	27
Anna Comarella	15 km skiathlon	22:50.7	30	21:06.1	41	44:25.9	+3:41.0	37
Anna Comarella	30 km classical	—N/a				1:35:48.7	+13:31.1	34
Ilaria Debertolis	10 km freestyle	—N/a				27:41.2	+2:40.7	31
Ilaria Debertolis	15 km skiathlon	23:38.7	46	21:24.6	50	45:44.6	+4:59.7	49
Sara Pellegrini	10 km freestyle	—N/a				28:01.5	+3:01.0	38
Sara Pellegrini	15 km skiathlon	23:03.7	33	20:40.7	31	44:16.3	+3:31.4	35
Sara Pellegrini	30 km classical	—N/a				1:36:07.3	+13:49.7	35
Lucia Scardoni	10 km freestyle	—N/a				28:04.1	+3:03.6	39
Lucia Scardoni	30 km classical	—N/a				1:40:26.3	+18:08.7	41
Elisa Brocard; Anna Comarella; Ilaria Debertolis; Lucia Scardoni	4 × 5 km relay	—N/a				54:22.0	+2:57.7	9

Sprint
Men

Athlete	Event	Qualification		Quarterfinal		Semifinal		Final	
Athlete	Event	Time	Rank	Time	Rank	Time	Rank	Time	Rank
Mirco Bertolina	Sprint	3:20.18	40	did not advance					
Federico Pellegrino	Sprint	3:13.18	9 Q	3:10.55	1 Q	3:06.17	2 Q	3:07.09	2nd place, silver medalist(s)
Maicol Rastelli	Sprint	3:11.32	4 Q	3:14.38	6	did not advance			
Stefan Zelger	Sprint	3:20.18	41	did not advance					
Dietmar Nöckler; Federico Pellegrino	Team sprint	—N/a				16:07.19	4 q	16:14.81	5

Women

Athlete	Event	Qualification		Quarterfinal		Semifinal		Final	
Athlete	Event	Time	Rank	Time	Rank	Time	Rank	Time	Rank
Greta Laurent	Sprint	3:25.54	32	did not advance					
Lucia Scardoni	Sprint	3:23.32	28	3:22.49	5	did not advance			
Gaia Vuerich	Sprint	3:19.01	18 Q	3:21.65	5	did not advance			
Elisa Brocard; Gaia Vuerich	Team sprint	—N/a				17:13.04	8	did not advance	

== Curling ==
Italy qualified a men's team by qualifying via the qualification event in Plzeň, Czech Republic.

Summary

Team	Event	Group Stage										Tiebreaker	Semifinal	Final / BM	
Team	Event	Opposition Score	Opposition Score	Opposition Score	Opposition Score	Opposition Score	Opposition Score	Opposition Score	Opposition Score	Opposition Score	Rank	Opposition Score	Opposition Score	Opposition Score	Rank
Amos Mosaner; Joël Retornaz; Simone Gonin; Daniele Ferrazza; Andrea Pilzer	Men's tournament	(Canada) CAN; L 3–5	(Switzerland) SUI; W 7–4	(United States) USA; W 10–9	(Denmark) DEN; L 4–6	(Japan) JPN; L 5–6	(United Kingdom) GBR; L 6–7	(South Korea) KOR; L 6–8	(Sweden) SWE; L 3–7	(Norway) NOR; W 6–4	9	did not advance			

=== Men's tournament ===
Final round robin standings
Team	Skip	Pld	W	L	PF	PA	EW	EL	BE	SE	S%	Qualification
Sweden	Niklas Edin	9	7	2	62	43	34	28	13	8	87%	Playoffs
Canada	Kevin Koe	9	6	3	56	46	36	34	14	8	87%	Playoffs
United States	John Shuster	9	5	4	67	63	37	39	4	6	80%	Playoffs
Great Britain	Kyle Smith	9	5	4	55	60	40	37	8	7	82%	Tiebreaker
Switzerland	Peter de Cruz	9	5	4	60	55	39	37	10	6	83%	Tiebreaker
Norway	Thomas Ulsrud	9	4	5	52	56	34	39	7	8	82%	
South Korea	Kim Chang-min	9	4	5	65	63	39	39	8	8	82%	
Japan	Yusuke Morozumi	9	4	5	48	56	33	35	13	5	81%	
Italy	Joël Retornaz	9	3	6	50	56	37	38	15	7	81%	
Denmark	Rasmus Stjerne	9	2	7	53	70	36	39	12	5	83%	

Round-robin

Italy has a bye in draws 5, 7 and 12.

Draw 1

Wednesday, 14 February, 09:05

Sheet B	1	2	3	4	5	6	7	8	9	10	Final
Canada (Koe)	0	0	0	0	1	1	0	2	0	1	5
Italy (Retornaz) 🔨	0	0	0	1	0	0	1	0	1	0	3

Draw 2

Wednesday, 14 February, 20:05

Sheet C	1	2	3	4	5	6	7	8	9	10	Final
Switzerland (de Cruz)	0	0	1	0	0	0	1	0	2	0	4
Italy (Retornaz) 🔨	1	1	0	1	0	1	0	1	0	2	7

Draw 3

Thursday, 15 February, 14:05

Sheet A	1	2	3	4	5	6	7	8	9	10	Final
United States (Shuster)	0	1	0	3	2	0	0	2	1	0	9
Italy (Retornaz) 🔨	1	0	5	0	0	3	0	0	0	1	10

Draw 4

Friday, 16 February, 09:05

Sheet B	1	2	3	4	5	6	7	8	9	10	Final
Italy (Retornaz)	0	1	0	0	1	1	0	0	0	1	4
Denmark (Stjerne) 🔨	2	0	2	0	0	0	0	0	2	0	6

Draw 6

Saturday, 17 February, 14:05

Sheet D	1	2	3	4	5	6	7	8	9	10	Final
Japan (Morozumi) 🔨	2	0	1	0	2	0	0	0	0	1	6
Italy (Retornaz)	0	1	0	2	0	0	0	1	1	0	5

Draw 8

Sunday, 18 February, 20:05

Sheet C	1	2	3	4	5	6	7	8	9	10	11	Final
Italy (Retornaz)	0	0	1	0	0	2	0	2	0	1	0	6
Great Britain (Smith) 🔨	2	0	0	1	0	0	2	0	1	0	1	7

Draw 9

Monday, 19 February, 14:05

Sheet A	1	2	3	4	5	6	7	8	9	10	Final
Italy (Retornaz)	0	1	0	2	0	1	0	1	1	0	6
South Korea (Kim) 🔨	3	0	1	0	1	0	2	0	0	1	8

Draw 10

Tuesday, 20 February, 09:05

Sheet D	1	2	3	4	5	6	7	8	9	10	Final
Italy (Retornaz)	0	0	0	1	1	0	0	1	0	X	3
Sweden (Edin) 🔨	3	1	1	0	0	1	0	0	1	X	7

Draw 11

Tuesday, 20 February, 20:05

Sheet B	1	2	3	4	5	6	7	8	9	10	Final
Norway (Ulsrud)	0	0	1	1	0	0	0	1	0	1	4
Italy (Retornaz) 🔨	0	1	0	0	0	1	1	0	3	0	6

== Figure skating ==
Athlete	Event	SP/OD		FS/FD		Total	
Athlete	Event	Points	Rank	Points	Rank	Points	Rank
Matteo Rizzo	Men's singles	75.63	23 Q	156.78	19	232.41	21
Carolina Kostner	Ladies' singles	73.15	6 Q	139.29	5	212.44	5
Giada Russo	Ladies' singles	50.88	27	did not advance			
Nicole Della Monica / Matteo Guarise	Pairs	74.00	9 Q	128.74	10	202.74	10
Valentina Marchei / Ondřej Hotárek	Pairs	74.50	7 Q	142.09	6	216.59	6
Anna Cappellini / Luca Lanotte	Ice dancing	76.57	5 Q	108.34	6	184.91	6
Charlène Guignard / Marco Fabbri	Ice dancing	68.16	11 Q	105.31	9	173.47	10

Team event

Athlete	Event	Short program/Short dance						Free skate/Free dance					
Athlete	Event	Men's	Ladies'	Pairs	Ice dance	Total		Men's	Ladies'	Pairs	Ice dance	Total	
Athlete	Event	Points Team points	Points Team points	Points Team points	Points Team points	Points	Rank	Points Team points	Points Team points	Points Team points	Points Team points	Points	Rank
Matteo Rizzo (M); Carolina Kostner (L); Nicole Della Monica / Matteo Guarise (P) (SP); Valentina Marchei / Ondřej Hotárek (P) (FS); Anna Cappellini / Luca Lanotte (ID)	Team event	77.77; 6	75.10; 9	67.62; 4	72.51; 7	26	4	156.11; 7	134.0; 7	138.44; 9	107.0; 7	56	4

== Freestyle skiing ==
Ski cross

Athlete	Event	Seeding		Round of 16	Quarterfinal	Semifinal	Final	
Athlete	Event	Time	Rank	Position	Position	Position	Position	Rank
Siegmar Klotz	Men's ski cross	1:10.15	15	3	did not advance			
Stefan Thanei	Men's ski cross	1:10.10	12	3	did not advance			
Lucrezia Fantelli	Women's ski cross	Withdrew due to injury						
Debora Pixner	Women's ski cross	1:15.72	14	2 Q	3	did not advance		

Qualification legend: FA – Qualify to medal round; FB – Qualify to consolation round

== Luge ==
Based on the results from the World Cups during the 2017–18 Luge World Cup season, Italy qualified 7 sleds.

Men

Athlete	Event	Run 1		Run 2		Run 3		Run 4		Total	
Athlete	Event	Time	Rank	Time	Rank	Time	Rank	Time	Rank	Time	Rank
Dominik Fischnaller	Singles	47.930	10	47.967	16	47.562	3	47.475	1	3:10.934	4
Kevin Fischnaller	Singles	47.853	8	47.793	5	47.596	5	47.812	8	3:11.054	7
Emanuel Rieder	Singles	48.040	14	48.047	17	47.972	18	48.082	18	3:12.141	17
Fabian Malleier; Ivan Nagler	Doubles	46.320	8	46.243	7	—N/a				1:32.563	7
Patrick Rastner; Ludwig Rieder	Doubles	46.709	14	46.567	15	—N/a				1:33.276	15

Women

Athlete	Event	Run 1		Run 2		Run 3		Run 4		Total	
Athlete	Event	Time	Rank	Time	Rank	Time	Rank	Time	Rank	Time	Rank
Sandra Robatscher	Singles	46.620	12	47.116	24	47.083	17	46.746	9	3:07.565	14
Andrea Vötter	Singles	46.577	10	46.483	11	46.907	15	46.892	13	3:06.859	10

Mixed team relay

Athlete	Event	Run 1		Run 2		Run 3		Total	
Athlete	Event	Time	Rank	Time	Rank	Time	Rank	Time	Rank
Andrea Vötter; Dominik Fischnaller; Fabian Malleier; Ivan Nagler	Team relay	47.078	2	48.827	6	49.188	6	2:25.093	5

== Nordic combined ==
Italy has qualified 4 athletes.

Athlete	Event	Ski jumping			Cross-country		Total	
Athlete	Event	Distance	Points	Rank	Time	Rank	Time	Rank
Raffaele Buzzi	Normal hill/10 km	88.0	74.6	40	25:29.1	33	29:13.1	40
Raffaele Buzzi	Large hill/10 km	117.5	87.9	35	24:02.5	18	27:26.5	34
Aaron Kostner	Normal hill/10 km	93.5	89.2	30	25:44.4	36	28:30.4	37
Aaron Kostner	Large hill/10 km	105.5	71.2	47	25:17.5	38	29:48.5	44
Alessandro Pittin	Normal hill/10 km	89.0	77.4	38	23:48.9	1	27:21.9	19
Alessandro Pittin	Large hill/10 km	109.0	82.2	40	23:13.9	1	27:00.9	27
Lukas Runggaldier	Normal hill/10 km	85.0	73.6	41	24:03.2	5	27:51.2	32
Lukas Runggaldier	Large hill/10 km	110.0	77.9	45	23:32.7	11	27:36.7	36
Raffaele Buzzi; Aaron Kostner; Alessandro Pittin; Lukas Runggaldier	Team large hill/4 x 5 km	447.5	291.8	10	47:17.1	4	51:14.1	8

== Short track speed skating ==
According to the ISU Special Olympic Qualification Rankings, Italy has qualified 2 men and 5 women.

Men

Athlete	Event	Heat		Quarterfinal		Semifinal		Final	
Athlete	Event	Time	Rank	Time	Rank	Time	Rank	Time	Rank
Yuri Confortola	500 m	40.869	3	did not advance					
Yuri Confortola	1000 m	1:25.297	2 Q	1:24.383	2 Q	1:26.626	3 FB	1:27.712	7
Yuri Confortola	1500 m	PEN		—N/a		did not advance			
Tommaso Dotti	1000 m	1:25.369	3	did not advance					
Tommaso Dotti	1500 m	2:16.177	4	—N/a		did not advance			

Women

Athlete	Event	Heat		Quarterfinal		Semifinal		Final	
Athlete	Event	Time	Rank	Time	Rank	Time	Rank	Time	Rank
Arianna Fontana	500 m	43.214	1 Q	43.128	1 Q	42.635	2 Q	42.569	1st place, gold medalist(s)
Arianna Fontana	1000 m	1:30.676	1 Q	1:30.074	1 Q	1:29.156	2 FA	1:30.656	3rd place, bronze medalist(s)
Arianna Fontana	1500 m	2:28.494	1 Q	—N/a		2:34.489	2 FA	2:27.475	7
Cynthia Mascitto	1000 m	1:32.926	4	did not advance					
Lucia Peretti	500 m	43.994	4	did not advance					
Martina Valcepina	500 m	43.698	1 Q	43.023	3	did not advance			
Martina Valcepina	1500 m	2:31.370	3 Q	—N/a		2:24.171	4 FB	PEN	12
Arianna Fontana; Cecilia Maffei; Cynthia Mascitto; Lucia Peretti; Martina Valcepina	3000 m relay	—N/a				4:05.918	2 FA	4:15.901	2nd place, silver medalist(s)

Qualification legend: ADV – Advanced due to being impeded by another skater; FA – Qualify to medal round; FB – Qualify to consolation round; AA – Advance to medal round due to being impeded by another skater

== Skeleton ==
Based on the world rankings, Italy qualified 1 sled.

Athlete	Event	Run 1		Run 2		Run 3		Run 4		Total	
Athlete	Event	Time	Rank	Time	Rank	Time	Rank	Time	Rank	Time	Rank
Joseph Luke Cecchini	Men's	51.88	24	51.80	25	51.96	26	Eliminated		2:35.64	27

== Ski jumping ==
Italy has qualified 8 athletes, 4 men and 4 women.

Men

Athlete	Event	Qualification			First round			Final			Total	
Athlete	Event	Distance	Points	Rank	Distance	Points	Rank	Distance	Points	Rank	Points	Rank
Davide Bresadola	Normal hill	88.0	95.8	37 Q	95.0	92.0	=35	did not advance				
Davide Bresadola	Large hill	117.0	80.0	42 Q	124.0	89.1	47	did not advance				
Federico Cecon	Normal hill	86.0	87.9	49 Q	85.5	72.3	48	did not advance				
Federico Cecon	Large hill	100.5	50.3	54	did not advance							
Sebastian Colloredo	Normal hill	91.0	97.9	36 Q	91.0	83.8	42	did not advance				
Sebastian Colloredo	Large hill	107.5	68.1	50 Q	121.0	102.7	40	did not advance				
Alex Insam	Normal hill	94.0	101.9	33 Q	84.0	76.9	45	did not advance				
Alex Insam	Large hill	123.0	93.1	32 Q	127.5	118.0	22 Q	125.0	114.4	22	232.4	23
Davide Bresadola; Federico Cecon; Sebastian Colloredo; Alex Insam	Team large hill	—N/a			453.5	364.5	11	did not advance				

Women

Athlete	Event	First round			Final			Total	
Athlete	Event	Distance	Points	Rank	Distance	Points	Rank	Points	Rank
Evelyn Insam	Normal hill	72.0	46.4	34	did not advance				
Lara Malsiner	Normal hill	88.5	90.2	16 Q	92.5	89.3	15	179.5	15
Manuela Malsiner	Normal hill	86.5	79.6	20 Q	89.0	83.8	22	163.4	18
Elena Runggaldier	Normal hill	71.5	48.8	33	did not advance				

== Snowboarding ==
Freestyle

Athlete	Event	Qualification				Final				
Athlete	Event	Run 1	Run 2	Best	Rank	Run 1	Run 2	Run 3	Best	Rank
Alberto Maffei	Men's big air	77.50	36.25	77.50	12	did not advance				

Parallel

Athlete	Event	Qualification		Round of 16	Quarterfinal	Semifinal	Final	
Athlete	Event	Time	Rank	Opposition Time	Opposition Time	Opposition Time	Opposition Time	Rank
Edwin Coratti	Men's giant slalom	1:25.70	12 Q	Payer (AUT); W –0.33	Dufour (FRA); L +0.19	did not advance		
Mirko Felicetti	Men's giant slalom	1:27.56	29	did not advance				
Roland Fischnaller	Men's giant slalom	1:25.44	8 Q	Wild (OAR); W –0.93	Galmarini (SUI); L +0.06	did not advance		
Aaron March	Men's giant slalom	1:26.58	23	did not advance				
Nadya Ochner	Women's giant slalom	1:33.80	18	did not advance				

Snowboard cross

Athlete	Event	Seeding						1/8 final	Quarterfinal	Semifinal	Final	
Athlete	Event	Run 1		Run 2		Best	Seed	1/8 final	Quarterfinal	Semifinal	Final	
Athlete	Event	Time	Rank	Time	Rank	Best	Seed	Position	Position	Position	Position	Rank
Michele Godino	Men's snowboard cross	1:20.88	38	1:14.96	4	1:14.96	28	3 Q	DNF	did not advance		
Emanuel Perathoner	Men's snowboard cross	1:14.62	18	Bye		1:14.62	18	4	did not advance			
Lorenzo Sommariva	Men's snowboard cross	1:14.36	13	Bye		1:14.36	13	4	did not advance			
Omar Visintin	Men's snowboard cross	1:13.25	2	Bye		1:13.25	2	4	did not advance			
Raffaella Brutto	Women's snowboard cross	DNF		1:21.14	7	1:21.14	19	—N/a	3 Q	DNF FB	2	8
Michela Moioli	Women's snowboard cross	1:16.97	2	Bye		1:16.97	2	—N/a	1 Q	1 FA	1	1st place, gold medalist(s)

Qualification legend: FA – Qualify to medal round; FB – Qualify to consolation round

== Speed skating ==
Men

Athlete	Event	Race	
Athlete	Event	Time	Rank
Davide Ghiotto	5000 m	6:29.25	19
Davide Ghiotto	10000 m	13:27.09	12
Andrea Giovannini	1500 m	1:47.82	27
Andrea Giovannini	5000 m	6:30.71	20
Mirko Nenzi	500 m	35.51	30
Mirko Nenzi	1000 m	1:10.16	30
Nicola Tumolero	5000 m	6:15.48	8
Nicola Tumolero	10000 m	12:54.32	3rd place, bronze medalist(s)

Women

Athlete	Event	Race	
Athlete	Event	Time	Rank
Francesca Bettrone	500 m	39.52	29
Francesca Bettrone	1000 m	1:17.83	27
Francesca Bettrone	1500 m	2:00.43	25
Yvonne Daldossi	500 m	39.28	26
Yvonne Daldossi	1000 m	1:19.33	30
Francesca Lollobrigida	1500 m	1:57.94	10
Francesca Lollobrigida	3000 m	4:08.58	13

Mass start

Athlete	Event	Semifinal			Final		
Athlete	Event	Points	Time	Rank	Points	Time	Rank
Andrea Giovannini	Men's mass start	41	8:24.41	2 Q	0	7:46.83	12
Francesca Bettrone	Women's mass start	5	8:38.69	6 Q	0	9:04.82	16
Francesca Lollobrigida	Women's mass start	68	8:54.19	1 Q	1	8:33.30	7

Team pursuit

Athlete	Event	Quarterfinal		Semifinal		Final	
Athlete	Event	Opposition Time	Rank	Opposition Time	Rank	Opposition Time	Rank
Riccardo Bugari; Davide Ghiotto; Andrea Giovannini; Michele Malfatti; Nicola Tumolero	Men's team pursuit	South Korea; L 3:41.64	6 FC	did not advance		Final C Japan; L DSQ	6

== See also ==
- Italy national alpine ski team
