= Simon Desthieux =

French biathlete (born 1991)

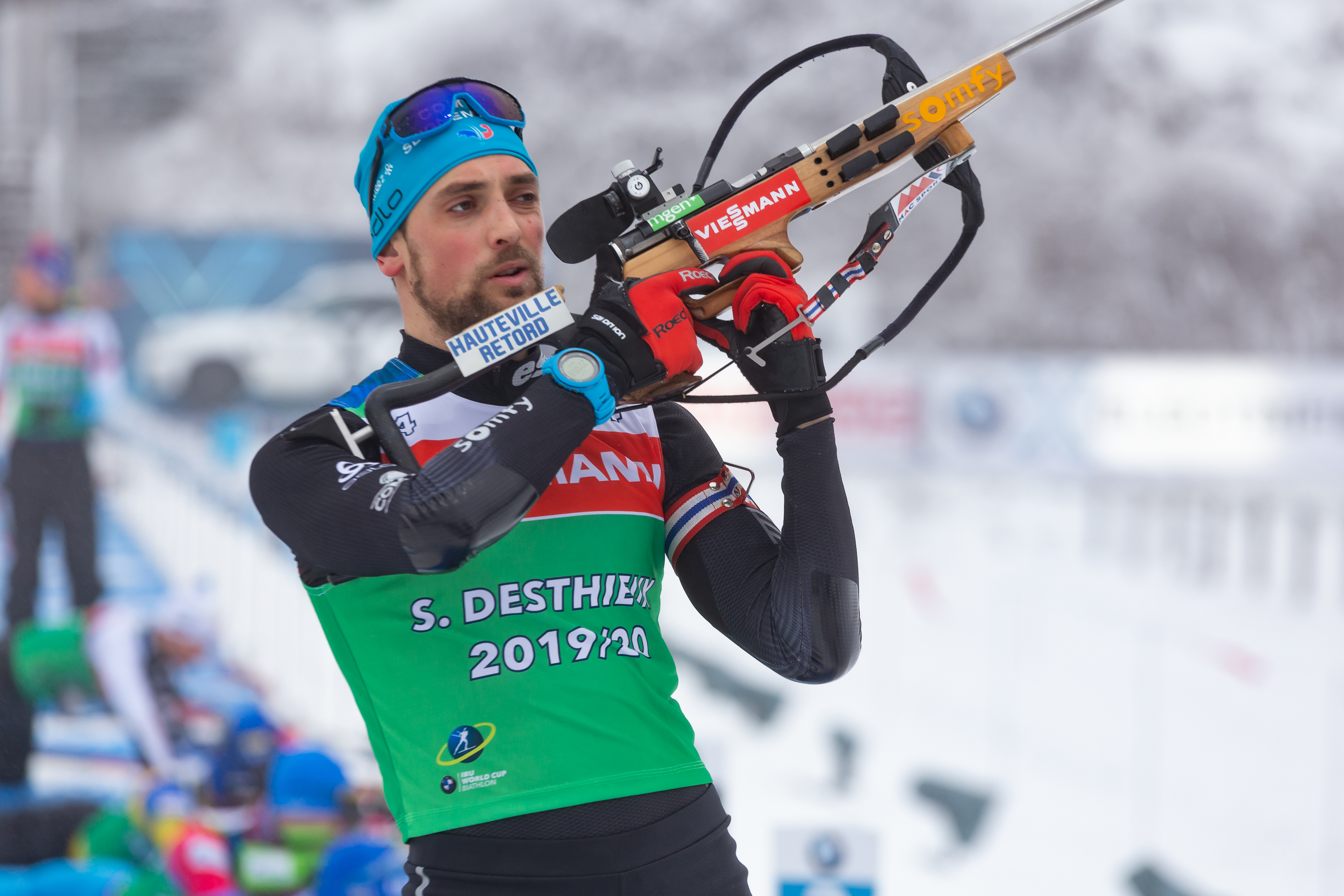
- Desthieux in 2020

Personal information
- Nationality: French
- Born: 3 December 1991 (age 34) Belley, France
- Height: 1.75 m (5 ft 9 in)
- Weight: 67 kg (148 lb)

Sport

Professional information
- Sport: Biathlon
- Club: Lompnes
- World Cup debut: 2012

Olympic Games
- Teams: 3 (2014, 2018, 2022)
- Medals: 2 (1 gold)

World Championships
- Teams: 7 (2013–2021)
- Medals: 3 (1 gold)

World Cup
- Seasons: 10 (2012/13–2021/22)
- Individual victories: 2
- All victories: 13
- Individual podiums: 8
- All podiums: 31
- Overall titles: 0
- Discipline titles: 0
Medal record
Men's biathlon
Representing France
Olympic Games
Gold medal – first place	2018 Pyeongchang	Mixed relay
Silver medal – second place	2022 Beijing	4 × 7.5 km relay
World Championships
Gold medal – first place	2020 Antholz	4 × 7.5 km relay
Silver medal – second place	2017 Hochfilzen	4 × 7.5 km relay
Silver medal – second place	2021 Pokljuka	10 km sprint
Junior World Championships
Gold medal – first place	2011 Nové Město	15 km individual
Bronze medal – third place	2012 Kontiolahti	10 km sprint
Bronze medal – third place	2012 Kontiolahti	4 × 7.5 km relay
Youth World Championships
Silver medal – second place	2010 Torsby	3 × 7.5 km relay

Simon Desthieux (French pronunciation: [simɔ̃ dɛstjø]; born 3 December 1991) is a French retired biathlete, both an Olympic and world champion.

He competed in the 2014 Winter Olympics for France, where he finished 45th in the sprint and 21st in the pursuit. Desthieux won his first World Championship medal in Hochfilzen 2017 when he was a part of men's relay team that became second. Next year he was a part of France's mixed relay team in the 2018 Winter Olympics and won his first Olympic gold medal. In Antholz-Anterselva 2020 won his first World Championship title with men's relay.

He announced his retirement after the 2021/22 season.

== Biathlon results ==
=== Olympic Games ===
2 medals (1 gold, 1 silver)

Event	Individual	Sprint	Pursuit	Mass start	Relay	Mixed relay
(Russia) 2014 Sochi	—	45th	21st	—	8th	—
(South Korea) 2018 Pyeongchang	27th	12th	7th	22nd	5th	Gold
(China) 2022 Beijing	17th	24th	7th	16th	Silver	—

=== World Championships ===
3 medals (1 gold, 2 silver)

Event	Individual	Sprint	Pursuit	Mass start	Relay	Mixed relay	Single mixed relay
(Czech Republic) 2013 Nové Město	—	67th	—	—	—	—	—N/a
(Finland) 2015 Kontiolahti	49th	—	—	—	—	—	—N/a
(Norway) 2016 Oslo Holmenkollen	28th	12th	6th	24th	9th	—	—N/a
(Austria) 2017 Hochfilzen	51st	34th	27th	—	Silver	—	—N/a
(Sweden) 2019 Östersund	6th	5th	32nd	11th	6th	8th	—
(Italy) 2020 Antholz-Anterselva	59th	18th	8th	5th	Gold	—	—
(Slovenia) 2021 Pokljuka	27th	Silver	5th	13th	4th	—	—

*The single mixed relay was added as an event in 2019.

=== World Cup ===
World Cup rankings

Season	Overall		Individual		Sprint		Pursuit		Mass start	
Season	Points	Position	Points	Position	Points	Position	Points	Position	Points	Position
2012–13	–	57th	—	—	–	48th	–	57th	—	—
2013–14	–	20th	–	19th	–	22nd	–	26th	–	5th
2014–15	–	56th	–	65th	–	51st	–	43rd	—	—
2015–16	–	16th	–	26th	–	21st	–	20th	–	10th
2016–17	–	25th	–	42nd	–	19th	–	23rd	–	27th
2017–18	–	8th	–	10th	–	6th	–	10th	–	11th
2018–19	–	4th	–	6th	–	3rd	–	4th	–	6th
2019–20	–	6th	–	11th	–	5th	–	7th	–	9th
2020–21	–	9th	–	22nd	–	8th	–	9th	–	11th
2021–22	–	7th	–	3rd	–	10th	–	6th	–	11th

Individual victories

2 victories (1 Sp, 1 MS)

No.	Season	Date	Location	Discipline	Level
1	2020–21	6 March 2021	(Czech Republic) Nové Město	10 km Sprint	Biathlon World Cup
2	2020–21	21 March 2021	(Sweden) Östersund	15 km Mass start	Biathlon World Cup

Relay victories

11 victories; victories at Winter Olympics are not counted as World Cup victories but are listed here.

No.	Season	Date	Location	Discipline	Level	Team
1	2016–17	11 December 2016	(Slovenia) Pokljuka	Relay	Biathlon World Cup	Béatrix / Fillon Maillet / Desthieux / Fourcade
2	2016–17	5 March 2017	(South Korea) Pyeongchang	Relay	Biathlon World Cup	Béatrix / S.Fourcade / Desthieux / Fourcade
3	2016–17	12 March 2017	(Finland) Kontiolahti	Mixed Relay	Biathlon World Cup	Dorin Habert / Bescond / Desthieux / Fillon Maillet
4	2017–18	20 February 2018	(South Korea) Pyeongchang	Mixed Relay	Winter Olympic Games	Dorin Habert / Bescond / Desthieux / Fourcade
5	2018–19	2 December 2018	(Slovenia) Pokljuka	Mixed Relay	Biathlon World Cup	Bescond / Braisaz / Fourcade / Desthieux
6	2018–19	17 February 2019	(United States) Salt Lake City	Mixed Relay	Biathlon World Cup	Fillon Maillet / Desthieux / Aymonier / Chevalier
7	2019–20	18 January 2020	(Germany) Ruhpolding	Relay	Biathlon World Cup	Jacquelin / Fourcade / Desthieux / Fillon Maillet
8	2019–20	25 January 2020	(Slovenia) Pokljuka	Mixed Relay	Biathlon World Cup	Fillon Maillet / Desthieux / Braisaz / Simon
9	2019–20	22 February 2020	(Italy) Antholz-Anterselva	Relay	Biathlon World Championships	Jacquelin / Fourcade / Desthieux / Fillon Maillet
10	2020–21	15 January 2021	(Germany) Oberhof	Relay	Biathlon World Cup	Desthieux / Fillon Maillet / Claude / Jacquelin
11	2020–21	23 January 2021	(Italy) Antholz-Anterselva	Relay	Biathlon World Cup	Guigonnat / Fillon Maillet / Desthieux / Jacquelin

=== Junior World Championships ===
Event	Individual	Sprint	Pursuit	Relay
(Sweden) 2010 Torsby	15th	42nd	15th	2nd
(Czech Republic) 2011 Nové Město	1st	7th	5th	5th
(Finland) 2012 Kontiolahti	9th	3rd	10th	3rd
