= Anaïs Bescond =

French biathlete (born 1987)

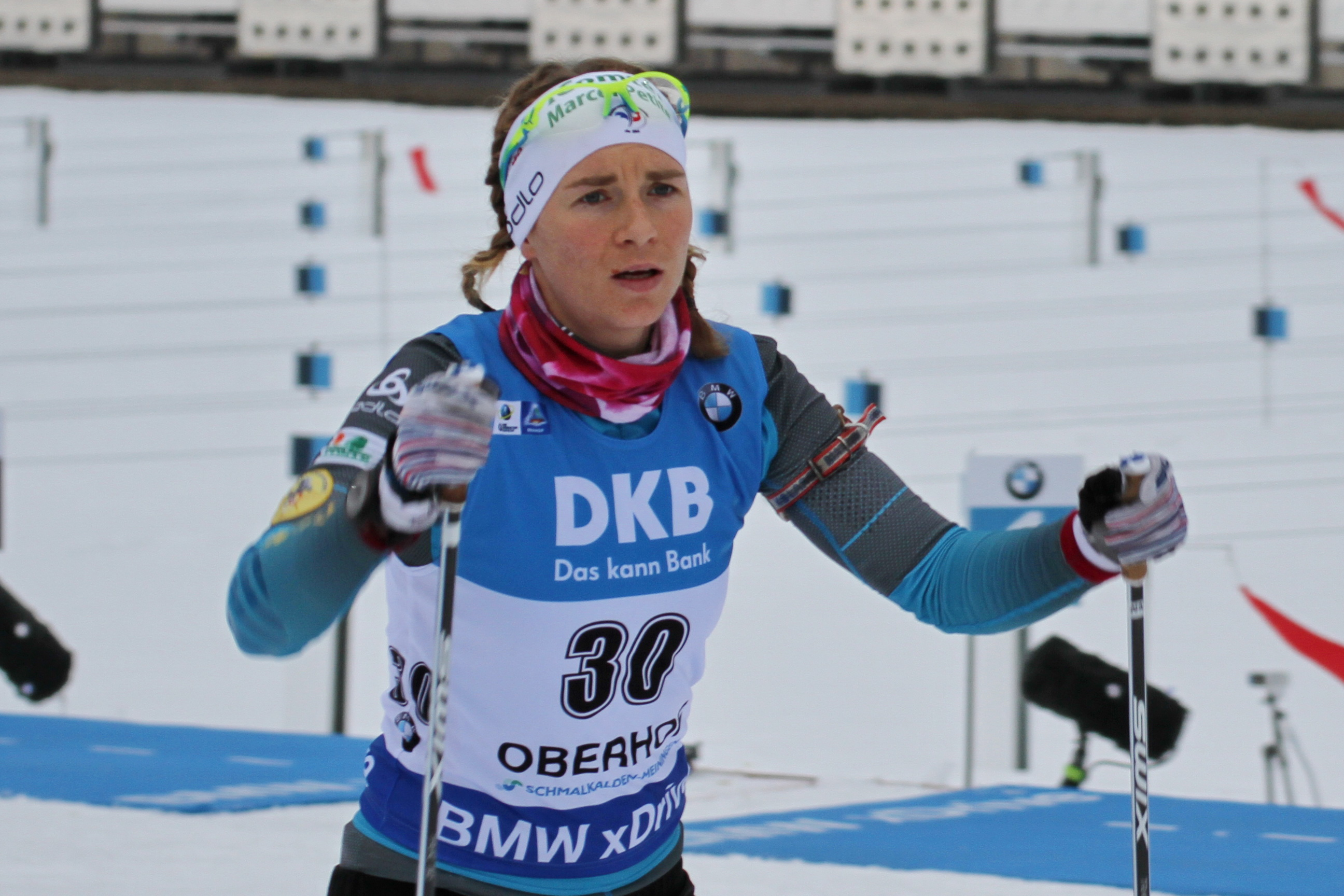
- Bescond in 2018

Personal information
- Born: 15 May 1987 (age 39) Aunay-sur-Odon, France
- Height: 1.71 m (5 ft 7 in)

Sport
- Country: France
- Sport: Biathlon

Professional information
- Club: EMHM-Morbier

Olympic Games
- Teams: 3 (2014, 2018, 2022)
- Medals: 3 (1 gold)

World Championships
- Teams: 9 (2011–2021)
- Medals: 8 (1 gold)

World Cup
- Seasons: 13 (2009/10–2021/22)
- Individual victories: 1
- All victories: 13
Medal record
Women's biathlon
Representing France
Olympic Games
Gold medal – first place	2018 Pyeongchang	Mixed relay
Bronze medal – third place	2018 Pyeongchang	10 km pursuit
Bronze medal – third place	2018 Pyeongchang	4 × 6 km relay
World Championships
Gold medal – first place	2016 Oslo	Mixed relay
Silver medal – second place	2011 Khanty-Mansiysk	4 x 6 km relay
Silver medal – second place	2012 Ruhpolding	4 x 6 km relay
Silver medal – second place	2015 Kontiolahti	4 x 6 km relay
Silver medal – second place	2015 Kontiolahti	Mixed relay
Silver medal – second place	2016 Oslo	15 km individual
Silver medal – second place	2016 Oslo	4 × 6 km relay
Bronze medal – third place	2020 Antholz	Single mixed relay
Junior World Championships
Silver medal – second place	2007 Martell	3 × 6 km relay
Silver medal – second place	2008 Ruhpolding	3 × 6 km relay
Bronze medal – third place	2007 Martell	12.5 km individual
Bronze medal – third place	2007 Martell	7.5 km sprint
Youth World Championships
Gold medal – first place	2005 Kontiolahti	3 × 6 km relay

Anaïs Bescond (French pronunciation: [anais bɛskɔ̃]; born 15 May 1987) is a French retired biathlete, both an Olympic and world champion. She is also a non-commissioned officer.

== Career ==
Bescond was born in Aunay-sur-Odon. She moved to Morbier, in the Jura region, with her family and began skiing. She competed at the Biathlon World Championships 2011, and won a silver medal in the relay with the French team, a result repeated at the Biathlon World Championships 2012.

She won her first victory on the World Cup biathlon sprint at Antholz-Anterselva, played on 16 January 2014.

Bescond competed in the Sochi 2014 Winter Olympics for France. Her best performance was two 5th places in the individual and sprint.

At the Pyeongchang 2018 Winter Olympics, she finished at the 3rd place in the pursuit, claimed gold with the French Team in the mixed relay and took bronze in the relay.

She announced her retirement after the 2021/22 season.

== Biathlon results ==
=== Olympic Games ===
3 medals (1 gold, 2 bronze)

Event	Individual	Sprint	Pursuit	Mass start	Relay	Mixed relay
(Russia) 2014 Sochi	5th	5th	12th	10th	DNF	6th
(South Korea) 2018 Pyeongchang	31st	19th	Bronze	17th	Bronze	Gold
(China) 2022 Beijing	30th	9th	27th	29th	6th	—

=== World Championships ===
8 medals (1 gold, 6 silver, 1 bronze)

Event	Individual	Sprint	Pursuit	Mass start	Relay	Mixed relay	Single mixed relay
(Russia) 2011 Khanty-Mansiysk	16th	39th	21st	22nd	Silver	—	—N/a
(Germany) 2012 Rupholding	53rd	19th	28th	17th	Silver	—	—N/a
(Czech Republic) 2013 Nové Město	48th	20th	23rd	14th	6th	—	—N/a
(Finland) 2015 Kontiolahti	7th	56th	—	9th	Silver	Silver	—N/a
(Norway) 2016 Oslo	Silver	12th	12th	5th	Silver	Gold	—N/a
(Austria) 2017 Hochfilzen	53rd	—	—	—	—	—	—N/a
(Sweden) 2019 Östersund	(did not race due to illness)						
(Italy) 2020 Antholz-Anterselva	52nd	20th	11th	10th	14th	—	Bronze
(Slovenia) 2021 Pokljuka	18th	34th	36th	23rd	8th	—	—

*The single mixed relay was added as an event in 2019.

=== World Cup ===
World Cup rankings

Season	Overall		Individual		Sprint		Pursuit		Mass start	
Season	Points	Position	Points	Position	Points	Position	Points	Position	Points	Position
2009–10	76	55th	12	61st	37	54th	27	45th	—	—
2010–11	343	25th	47	31st	163	20th	86	27th	47	31st
2011–12	251	30th	22	39th	119	30th	86	29th	24	39th
2012–13	499	17th	13	50th	168	19th	170	18th	148	11th
2013–14	360	21st	12	45th	171	14th	114	28th	63	18th
2014–15	545	12th	67	16th	163	19th	149	14th	166	7th
2015–16	666	9th	107	5th	234	8th	161	15th	164	6th
2016–17	501	14th	58	18th	203	11th	165	17th	79	23rd
2017–18	582	7th	51	11th	219	9th	216	6th	123	14th
2018–19	423	22nd	36	32nd	142	22nd	147	20th	100	20th
2019–20	450	15th	48	20th	138	18th	92	17th	172	5th
2020–21	442	18th	61	12th	133	24th	118	22nd	89	21st
2021–22	-	14th	-	48th	-	8th	-	6th	-	26th

Individual victories

1 victory (1 Sp)

No.	Season	Date	Event	Competition	Level
1	2013–14	16 January 2014	(Italy) Antholz	7.5 km Sprint	Biathlon World Cup

Relay victories

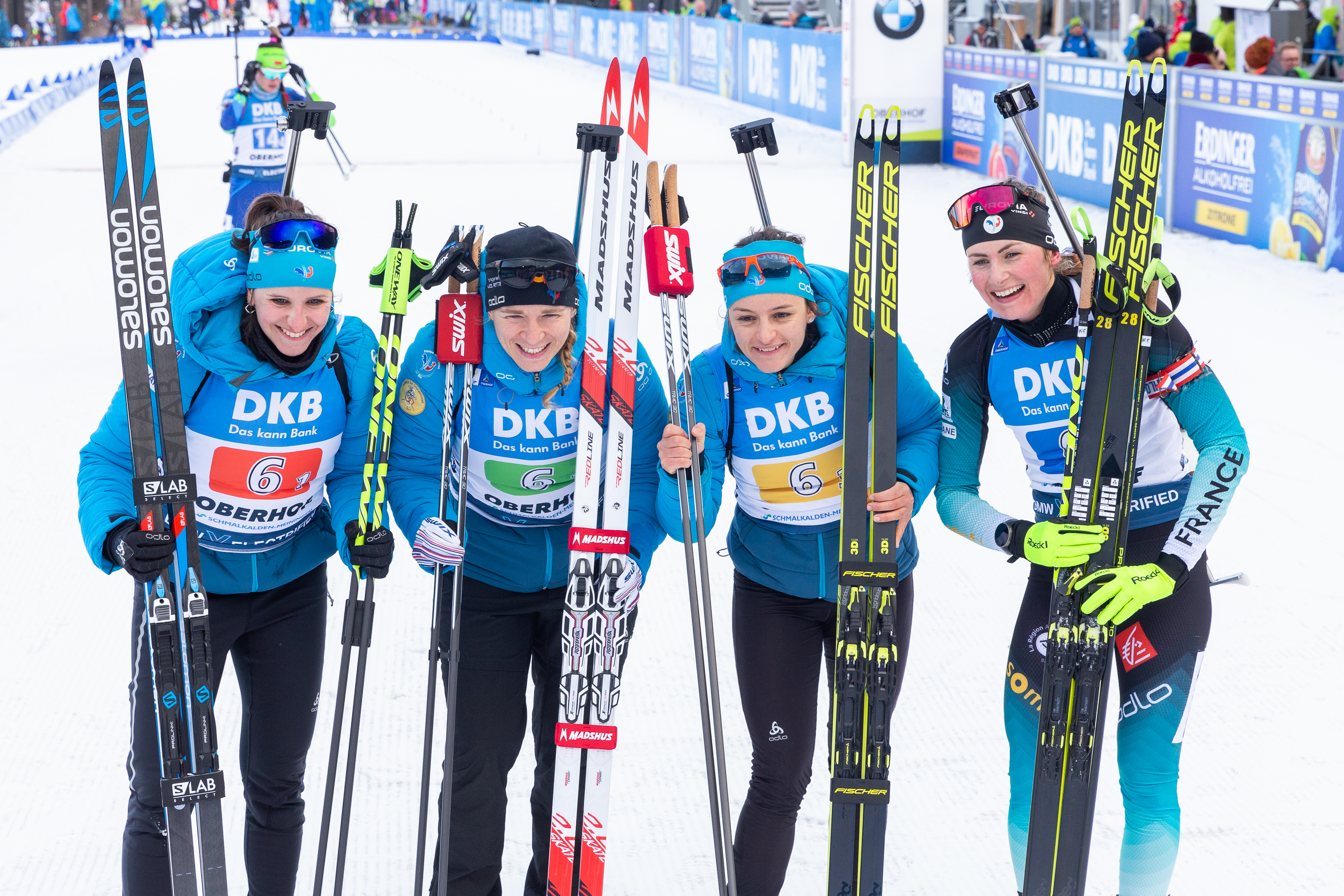
Simon / Bescond / Aymonier / Braisaz finishing 3rd at Oberhof on 11th January 2020

13 victories

No.	Season	Date	Location	Discipline	Level	Team
1	2011–12	21 January 2012	(Italy) Antholz-Anterselva	Relay	Biathlon World Cup	Brunet / Boilley / Bescond / Dorin Habert
2	2011–12	10 February 2012	(Finland) Kontiolahti	Mixed Relay	Biathlon World Cup	Boilley / Bescond / Béatrix / Jay
3	2014–15	30 November 2014	(Sweden) Östersund	Mixed Relay	Biathlon World Cup	Bescond / Chevalier / S.Fourcade / Fourcade
4	2015–16	24 January 2016	(Italy) Antholz-Anterselva	Relay	Biathlon World Cup	Braisaz / Bescond / Chevalier / Dorin Habert
5	2015–16	3 March 2016	(Norway) Oslo Holmenkollen	Mixed Relay	World Championships	Bescond / Dorin Habert / Fillon Maillet / Fourcade
6	2016–17	12 March 2017	(Finland) Kontiolahti	Mixed Relay	Biathlon World Cup	Dorin Habert / Bescond / Desthieux / Fillon Maillet
7	2017–18	7 January 2018	(Germany) Oberhof	Relay	Biathlon World Cup	Bescond / Chevalier / Aymonier / Braisaz
8	2017–18	20 February 2018	(South Korea) Pyeongchang	Mixed Relay	Winter Olympic Games	Dorin Habert / Bescond / Desthieux / Fourcade
9	2017–18	17 March 2018	(Norway) Oslo Holmenkollen	Relay	Biathlon World Cup	Chevalier / Aymonier / Dorin Habert / Bescond
10	2018–19	2 December 2018	(Slovenia) Pokljuka	Mixed Relay	Biathlon World Cup	Bescond / Braisaz / Fourcade / Desthieux
11	2018–19	19 January 2019	(Germany) Ruhpolding	Relay	Biathlon World Cup	Simon / Bescond / Braisaz / Chevalier
12	2019–20	25 January 2020	(Slovenia) Pokljuka	Single Mixed Relay	Biathlon World Cup	Jacquelin / Bescond
13	2021–22	5 December 2021	(Sweden) Östersund	Relay	Biathlon World Cup	Bescond / Chevalier / Simon / Braisaz
