= Speed skating at the 2018 Winter Olympics – Qualification =

The following is about the qualification rules and the quota allocation for the speed skating at the 2018 Winter Olympics.

== Qualification rules ==
A total quota of 180 athletes were allowed to compete at the Games (max. 100 men and max. 80 women). Countries were assigned quotas based on their performance during the 2017–18 ISU Speed Skating World Cup in the autumn of 2017. Each nation was permitted to enter a maximum of three athletes per gender for all events apart from the 5000m, 10000m and mass start events, for which they could enter a maximum of two athletes per event.

== Qualification times ==
The following requisite qualification times were released in June 2017.

Event	Men	Women
500 metres	35.70	39.50
1000 metres	1:10.50	1:18.00
1500 metres	1:48.00	1:59.50
3000 metres	—N/a	4:12.00
5000 metres	6:30.00	7:20.00 or 4:08.00 (3000 m)
Mass start	1:57.50 (1500 m)	2:10.00 (1500 m)
10,000 metres	13:30.00 or 6:25.00 (5000 m)	—N/a

== Quota allocation ==
Final Standings after World Cup 4 on 10 December 2017. The "total" column began with 257 based on the maximum which the nation could be allocated from the individual distance allotments, and shrank to 184 by national team nominations and reallocation. On 5 February, the final breakdown of 184 quotas was announced.

NOC	Men							Women							Total
NOC	500m	1,000m	1500m	5,000m	10,000m	Team pursuit	Mass start	500m	1,000m	1500m	3,000m	5,000m	Team pursuit	Mass start	Total
Australia	1	1													1
Austria							1	1	1	1				1	2
Belarus	1	1					1	1	1	1	1	1		1	5
Belgium	1	1	1	1			1			1		1			3
Canada	3	3	3	1	2	X	1	~~3~~ 2	~~3~~ 2	3	3	2	X	2	19
China	3	1	1				1	3	3	3	2		X	2	13
Chinese Taipei	1		1					1	1	1					3
Colombia	1	1												1	2
Czech Republic								1	2	2	2	1		1	3
Denmark							2							1	3
Estonia		1	1											1	2
Finland	2	2						1							3
France			1	1			1								1
Germany	2	2	1	2	2			2	3	2	2	1	X	1	9
Hungary		1	1												1
Italy	1	1	2	3	2	X	1	2	1	1	1			2	9
Japan	3	3	3	2	1	X	2	3	3	3	3	2	X	2	16
Kazakhstan	3	3	2				1	1	1	1					6
Latvia		1	1	~~1~~			1								1
Netherlands	3	3	3	3	2	X	2	3	3	3	3	2	X	2	20
New Zealand			2	1	1	X	2								3
Norway	~~3~~ 2	2	3	3	1	X	1	1	2	2	1				9
Poland	3	3	3	2			1	1	1	3	3		X	2	14
Olympic Athletes from Russia	~~3~~	~~3~~	~~3~~ 1	~~3~~	~~1~~		~~2~~	~~3~~ 2	~~3~~ 2	~~3~~ 1	2	~~2~~ 1	~~X~~	~~2~~	3
Romania								1							1
South Korea	3	3	2	1	1	X	2	3	3	1			X	2	16
Sweden			~~1~~	1											1
Switzerland			1	1			1							1	2
United States	3	3	3	2		X	2	3	3	3	1	1	X	2	13
Total: 29 NOCs	36	36	36	24	12	8	24	32	32	32	24	12	8	24	(184) 180

== Reserves ==
If a country rejects a quota spot or reduces its team then additional quotas become available. In case of reallocation of unused quotas places, priority will be given to NOC's that have not yet been allocated a quota place for the event. The NOCs that will thus have priority for reallocation of quota places for the respective events are marked with an asterisk (*) in the table below.

Men

Quota remaining to reallocate

500m (4 confirmed)	1000m (3 confirmed)	1500m (3 confirmed)	5000m (2 confirmed)	10,000m (1 confirmed)	Mass start (2 confirmed)
Kazakhstan; China; Belgium * ~~Finland~~; ~~Sweden~~ * Germany	Finland; ~~Sweden~~ * Germany; Norway; Belgium * China *	Germany; South Korea; China * Estonia * Belgium; Chinese Taipei *	Canada; Poland * United States * Canada; Japan; Poland	Japan * ~~Olympic Athletes from Russia~~; Belgium * Norway; France * Sweden *	Italy; Kazakhstan * Austria; Poland; Belarus * Colombia *

Women

Quota remaining to reallocate

500m (2 confirmed)	1000m (2 confirmed)	1500m (2 confirmed)	3000m	5000m (1 confirmed)	Mass start (2 confirmed)
Belarus * Norway; Czech Republic; Norway; Romania * Poland	Italy * Poland; Italy; Belarus * Czech Republic; Norway	Italy * South Korea * Germany; Italy; Belarus; South Korea	China; South Korea * Germany; ~~Olympic Athletes from Russia~~; Belgium * United States	Belgium * Czech Republic; Italy * Germany; Poland * Norway *	Poland; Great Britain * Czech Republic; Austria; Colombia * Belarus

Team Pursuit events

Unused Team Pursuit quota places may be provisionally reallocated to the next best placed team based on the Team Pursuit SOQC (Special Olympic Qualifying Classification), as per Rule 209, paragraph 2 d), as follows :

Men Team Pursuit	Women Team Pursuit (1 confirmed)
Poland; ~~Olympic Athletes from Russia~~; China	United States; Czech Republic; Italy
