= Ski jumping at the 2018 Winter Olympics – Qualification =

The following is about the qualification rules and the quota allocation for the ski jumping events at the 2018 Winter Olympics.

== Qualification rules ==
=== Host quota ===
The host, South Korea, will be allowed to enter at least one male and one female competitor provided they meet minimum standards. They must have at least 1 career World Cup or Grand Prix point, or have 1 Continental Cup point during the qualification timeline.

=== Quotas ===
The quotas will be allocated using the Olympic Quota Allocation List, which is calculated using the FIS World Cup standings and Continental Cup Standings from seasons 2016/17 and 2017/18 added together. The quotas will be distributed by assigning one quota place per athlete downwards on the list until the total of 60 male and 35 female competitors is reached (including the host nation quota). When a nation has received the maximum of five male or four female quotas, its athletes won't count on the allocation list. After the 60 male and 35 female quotas are distributed, if there are less than 12 NOCs with at least four male competitors allocated quota places, the next nation with three allocated quota places will be allocated an additional quota place. This will continue until there are 12 NOCs with four competitors. Any remaining quotas will be distributed to nations not yet represented, with a maximum of one each, until the quota limit of 65 is reached.

== Quota allocation ==
Allocation as of 25 January 2018.

=== Final summary ===
NOC	Athletes			Total
NOC	Men	Women	Men's team	Total
Austria	5	3	X	8
Bulgaria	1			1
Canada	1	1		2
China		1		1
Czech Republic	5		X	5
Estonia	3			3
Finland	5	1	X	6
France	2	2		4
Germany	5	4	X	9
Italy	4^{1}	4	X	8
Japan	5	4	X	9
Kazakhstan	1			1
Norway	5	2	X	7
Poland	5		X	5
Romania		1		1
Olympic Athletes from Russia	~~5~~ 4	4	X	8
Slovenia	5	4	X	9
South Korea	4^{2}	1^{2}	X	5
Switzerland	~~4~~ 2			2
Turkey	1			1
United States	4^{1}	3	X	7
Total: 21 NOCs	67	35	12	102

1. ITA, and USA awarded one men's allocation for the team event.
2. One host allocation was being used in the men's and women's competition. Two additional host athletes were permitted to compete in the team competition.

=== Next eligible NOC per event ===
Two nations rejected a total of three male quotas. A country can be eligible for more than one quota spot per event in the reallocation process. A line through the nation indicates they passed on the quota, while bolding indicates acceptance.

Men's	Women's
~~France~~; Estonia; ~~France~~; South Korea; Estonia; Kazakhstan; France; Kazakhstan; Turkey; Ukraine	France; United States; Norway; France; Canada; Canada; China; Canada; Norway; Austria
