= Speed skating at the 2018 Winter Olympics – Men's 1500 metres =

Men's 1500 metres at the XXIII Olympic Winter Games
- Venue: Gangneung Oval
- Date: 13 February 2018
- Competitors: 35 from 19 nations

Medalists
1st place, gold medalist(s)		Kjeld Nuis	Netherlands
2nd place, silver medalist(s)		Patrick Roest	Netherlands
3rd place, bronze medalist(s)		Kim Min-seok	South Korea

The men's 1500 metres speed skating competition of the 2018 Winter Olympics was held on 13 February 2018 at the Gangneung Oval in Gangneung. Kjeld Nuis posted a time 0.06 seconds short of the Olympic record and won the gold medal. Patrick Roest won silver, and Kim Min-seok bronze, becoming the first Asian athlete to ever medal in this event. For all three of them, it was their first Olympic race and first Olympic medal. The defending champion Zbigniew Bródka, as well as the 2014 silver, Koen Verweij, and bronze, Denny Morrison, medalists participated in the event but finished outside of the top 10.

== Records ==
Prior to this competition, the existing world, Olympic and track records were as follows.

World record	Denis Yuskov (RUS)	1:41.02	Salt Lake City, United States	9 December 2017
Olympic record	Derek Parra (USA)	1:43.95	Salt Lake City, United States	19 February 2002
Track record	Kjeld Nuis (NED)	1:44.36		12 February 2017

The following records were set during this competition.

Date	Round	Athlete	Country	Time	Record
13 February	Pair 14	Kjeld Nuis	Netherlands	1:44.01	TR

== Results ==
The races were held at 20:00.

Rank	Pair	Lane	Name	Country	Time	Time behind	Notes
1st place, gold medalist(s)	14	O	Kjeld Nuis	Netherlands	1:44.01	—	TR
2nd place, silver medalist(s)	4	I	Patrick Roest	Netherlands	1:44.86	+0.85	
3rd place, bronze medalist(s)	15	I	Kim Min-seok	South Korea	1:44.93	+0.92	
4	15	O	Haralds Silovs	Latvia	1:45.25	+1.24	
5	14	I	Takuro Oda	Japan	1:45.44	+1.43	
6	10	O	Bart Swings	Belgium	1:45.49	+1.48	
7	17	I	Sindre Henriksen	Norway	1:45.64	+1.63	
8	18	O	Joey Mantia	United States	1:45.86	+1.85	
9	18	I	Sverre Lunde Pedersen	Norway	1:46.12	+2.11	
10	8	O	Shane Williamson	Japan	1:46.21	+2.20	
11	16	O	Koen Verweij	Netherlands	1:46.26	+2.25	
12	11	O	Zbigniew Bródka	Poland	1:46.31	+2.30	
13	13	O	Denny Morrison	Canada	1:46.36	+2.35	
14	9	I	Peter Michael	New Zealand	1:46.39	+2.38	
15	11	I	Brian Hansen	United States	1:46.44	+2.43	
16	12	I	Jan Szymański	Poland	1:46.48	+2.47	
17	5	O	Joo Hyong-jun	South Korea	1:46.65	+2.64	
18	7	O	Sergey Trofimov	Olympic Athletes from Russia	1:46.69	+2.68	
19	10	I	Shani Davis	United States	1:46.74	+2.73	
20	13	I	Konrad Niedźwiedzki	Poland	1:47.07	+3.06	
21	17	O	Vincent De Haître	Canada	1:47.32	+3.31	
22	2	O	Alexis Contin	France	1:47.33	+3.32	
23	5	I	Mathias Vosté	Belgium	1:47.34	+3.33	
24	3	O	Shota Nakamura	Japan	1:47.38	+3.37	
25	9	O	Livio Wenger	Switzerland	1:47.76	+3.75	
26	4	O	Reyon Kay	New Zealand	1:47.81	+3.80	
27	12	O	Andrea Giovannini	Italy	1:47.82	+3.81	
28	7	I	Fyodor Mezentsev	Kazakhstan	1:48.23	+4.22	
29	6	I	Konrád Nagy	Hungary	1:49.01	+5.00	
30	3	I	Denis Kuzin	Kazakhstan	1:49.14	+5.13	
31	8	I	Ben Donnelly	Canada	1:49.68	+5.67	
32	6	O	Xiakaini Aerchenghazi	China	1:50.16	+6.15	
33	1	I	Marten Liiv	Estonia	1:50.23	+6.22	
34	2	I	Tai William	Chinese Taipei	1:50.63	+6.62	
	16	I	Allan Dahl Johansson	Norway	DNF		
