= China at the 2018 Winter Olympics =

- Flag of China
- IOC code: CHN
- NOC: Chinese Olympic Committee
- Website: www.olympic.cn (in Chinese and English)

in PyeongChang, South Korea February 9–25, 2018
- Competitors: 80 in 12 sports
- Flag bearers: Zhou Yang (opening); Wu Dajing (closing)
- Medals Ranked 16th: Gold 1 Silver 6 Bronze 2 Total 9

Winter Olympics appearances (overview)
- 1980; 1984; 1988; 1992; 1994; 1998; 2002; 2006; 2010; 2014; 2018; 2022; 2026

China competed at the 2018 Winter Olympics in PyeongChang, South Korea, from 9 to 25 February 2018. China competed in 12 sports, participating in bobsleigh, skeleton, and ski jumping for the first time. China won 9 medals in total.

Liu Jiayu won a silver medal in the Women's halfpipe, the first-ever medal in snowboarding for China. Gao Tingyu won a bronze medal in the Men's 500m speed skating event and became the first male speed skater from China to win a medal in Olympic speed skating. Wu Dajing won a gold medal in the Men's 500 m short track speed skating event and became the first male short track speed skater from China to win a gold medal in Olympic short track speed skating. He also broke the world record.

With Beijing being the host of the 2022 Winter Olympics, a Chinese segment directed by Zhang Yimou was performed at the closing ceremony. Those 2022 Winter Olympics made Beijing the first city to host both Winter and Summer Olympics, after they hosted the 2008 Summer Olympics.

== Medalists ==
Medal	Name	Sport	Event	Date
Gold	Wu Dajing	Short track speed skating	Men's 500 metres	22 February
Silver	Liu Jiayu	Snowboarding	Women's halfpipe	13 February
Silver	Sui Wenjing; Han Cong	Figure skating	Pairs	15 February
Silver	Zhang Xin	Freestyle skiing	Women's aerials	16 February
Silver	Li Jinyu	Short track speed skating	Women's 1500 metres	17 February
Silver	Jia Zongyang	Freestyle skiing	Men's aerials	18 February
Silver	Chen Dequan; Han Tianyu; Wu Dajing; Xu Hongzhi; Ren Ziwei	Short track speed skating	Men's 5000 metre relay	22 February
Bronze	Kong Fanyu	Freestyle skiing	Women's aerials	16 February
Bronze	Gao Tingyu	Speed skating	Men's 500 m	19 February

Medals by sport
Sport	1st place, gold medalist(s)	2nd place, silver medalist(s)	3rd place, bronze medalist(s)	Total
Short track speed skating	1	2	0	3
Freestyle skiing	0	2	1	3
Figure skating	0	1	0	1
Snowboarding	0	1	0	1
Speed skating	0	0	1	1
Total	1	6	2	9

Medals by date
Day	Date	1st place, gold medalist(s)	2nd place, silver medalist(s)	3rd place, bronze medalist(s)	Total
Day 1	February 10	0	0	0	0
Day 2	February 11	0	0	0	0
Day 3	February 12	0	0	0	0
Day 4	February 13	0	1	0	1
Day 5	February 14	0	0	0	0
Day 6	February 15	0	1	0	1
Day 7	February 16	0	1	1	2
Day 8	February 17	0	1	0	1
Day 9	February 18	0	1	0	1
Day 10	February 19	0	0	1	1
Day 11	February 20	0	0	0	0
Day 12	February 21	0	0	0	0
Day 13	February 22	1	1	0	2
Day 14	February 23	0	0	0	0
Day 15	February 24	0	0	0	0
Day 16	February 25	0	0	0	0
Total		1	6	2	9

Medals by gender
Gender	1st place, gold medalist(s)	2nd place, silver medalist(s)	3rd place, bronze medalist(s)	Total
Male	1	2	1	4
Female	0	3	1	4
Mixed	0	1	0	1
Total	1	6	2	9

== Records ==
Sport	Event	Date	Round	Athlete	Time	Record	Ref
Short track speed skating	Men's 500 metres	20 February	Heat 1	Wu Dajing	40.264	OR	
Short track speed skating	Men's 500 metres	22 February	Quarterfinal 2	Wu Dajing	39.800	OR, WR	
Short track speed skating	Men's 500 metres	22 February	Final A	Wu Dajing	39.584	OR, WR	
Short track speed skating	Women's 3000 metre relay	10 February	Semifinal 2	Fan Kexin; Han Yutong; Qu Chunyu; Zhou Yang	4:05.315	OR	

== Competitors ==
The following is the list of number of competitors that participated in the Games per sport/discipline.

Sport	Men	Women	Total
Alpine skiing	1	1	2
Biathlon	0	2	2
Bobsleigh	5	0	5
Cross-country skiing	2	2	4
Curling	1	6	7
Figure skating	6	5	11
Freestyle skiing	6	9	15
Short track speed skating	5	5	10
Skeleton	1	0	1
Ski jumping	0	1	1
Snowboarding	2	7	9
Speed skating	5	8	13
Total	34	46	80

== Alpine skiing ==
China qualified one male and one female alpine skier.

Athlete	Event	Run 1		Run 2		Total	
Athlete	Event	Time	Rank	Time	Rank	Time	Rank
Zhang Yangming	Men's giant slalom	1:25.73	79	1:22.95	69	2:48.68	69
Kong Fanying	Women's giant slalom	1:26.30	61	1:23.58	56	2:49.88	55
Kong Fanying	Women's slalom	DNF					

== Biathlon ==
China qualified two female biathletes.

Athlete	Event	Time	Misses	Rank
Tang Jialin	Women's sprint	24:30.3	3 (1+2)	70
Tang Jialin	Women's individual	48:12.0	2 (1+1+0+0)	66
Zhang Yan	Women's sprint	23:14.0	1 (1+0)	38
Zhang Yan	Women's pursuit	35:16.7	3 (3+0+0+0)	45
Zhang Yan	Women's individual	47:29.6	4 (1+2+0+1)	59

== Bobsleigh ==
Based on their rankings in the 2017–18 Bobsleigh World Cup, China had qualified 3 sleds.

Athlete	Event	Run 1		Run 2		Run 3		Run 4		Total	
Athlete	Event	Time	Rank	Time	Rank	Time	Rank	Time	Rank	Time	Rank
Li Chunjian*; Wang Sidong	Two-man	50.13	26	50.21	27	50.15	27	Eliminated		2:30.49	26
Jin Jian*; Shi Hao	Two-man	50.47	29	50.17	26	50.33	28	Eliminated		2:30.97	29
Shao Yijun*; Shi Hao; Li Chunjian; Wang Sidong	Four-man	49.79	26	50.01	27	49.94	23	Eliminated		2:29.74	26

* – Denotes the driver of each sled

- Wang Chao was the teams alternate and did not compete.

== Cross-country skiing ==
China qualified two male and two female cross-country skiers.

Distance

Athlete	Event	Classical		Freestyle		Final		
Athlete	Event	Time	Rank	Time	Rank	Time	Deficit	Rank
Sun Qinghai	Men's 15 km freestyle	—N/a				41:55.7	+8:11.8	98
Wang Qiang	Men's 15 km freestyle	—N/a				DSQ		
Wang Qiang	Men's 30 km skiathlon	47:03.8	64	LAP				
Wang Qiang	Men's 50 km classical	—N/a				2:34:43.0	+26:20.9	59
Chi Chunxue	Women's 10 km freestyle	—N/a				28:49.7	+3:49.2	55
Chi Chunxue	Women's 15 km skiathlon	24:16.1	57	21:47.2	56	46:39.0	+5:54.1	55
Chi Chunxue	Women's 30 km classical	—N/a				1:42:03.2	+19:45.6	44
Li Xin	Women's 10 km freestyle	—N/a				27:44.5	+2:44.0	36
Li Xin	Women's 15 km skiathlon	23:51.7	52	21:31.3	51	46:01.9	+5:17.0	51
Li Xin	Women's 30 km classical	—N/a				1:38:04.9	+15:47.3	37

Sprint

Athlete	Event	Qualification		Quarterfinals		Semifinals		Final	
Athlete	Event	Time	Rank	Time	Rank	Time	Rank	Time	Rank
Sun Qinghai	Men's sprint	DSQ		Did not advance					
Wang Qiang	Men's sprint	3:31.56	66	Did not advance					
Sun Qinghai; Wang Qiang	Men's team sprint	—N/a				18:11.95	14	Did not advance	
Chi Chunxue	Women's sprint	3:42.70	57	Did not advance					
Li Xin	Women's sprint	3:33.61	49	Did not advance					
Chi Chunxue; Li Xin	Women's team sprint	—N/a				17:35.94	9	Did not advance	

== Curling ==
Summary

Team	Event	Group stage										Tiebreaker	Semifinal	Final / BM	
Team	Event	Opposition Score	Opposition Score	Opposition Score	Opposition Score	Opposition Score	Opposition Score	Opposition Score	Opposition Score	Opposition Score	Rank	Opposition Score	Opposition Score	Opposition Score	Rank
Wang Bingyu; Zhou Yan; Liu Jinli; Ma Jingyi; Jiang Xindi	Women's tournament	(Switzerland) SUI; W 7–2	(International Olympic Committee) OAR; L 6–7	(United Kingdom) GBR; L 7–8	(Japan) JPN; W 7–6	(Denmark) DEN; W 10–7	(South Korea) KOR; L 5–12	(United States) USA; L 4–10	(Canada) CAN; W 7–5	(Sweden) SWE; L 4–8	5	Did not advance			
Wang Rui; Ba Dexin	Mixed doubles	(Switzerland) SUI; L 5–7	(South Korea) KOR; W 8–7	(Canada) CAN; L 4–10	(International Olympic Committee) OAR; L 5–6	(United States) USA; W 6–4	(Finland) FIN; W 10–5	(Norway) NOR; W 9–3	—N/a		4 TB	(Norway) NOR; L 7–9	Did not advance		4

=== Women's tournament ===
China qualified a women's team by qualifying via the qualification event in Plzeň, Czech Republic.

Final round robin standings
Team	Skip	Pld	W	L	PF	PA	EW	EL	BE	SE	S%	Qualification
South Korea	Kim Eun-jung	9	8	1	75	44	41	34	5	15	79%	Playoffs
Sweden	Anna Hasselborg	9	7	2	64	48	42	34	14	13	83%	Playoffs
Great Britain	Eve Muirhead	9	6	3	61	56	39	38	12	6	79%	Playoffs
Japan	Satsuki Fujisawa	9	5	4	59	55	38	36	10	13	75%	Playoffs
China	Wang Bingyu	9	4	5	57	65	35	38	12	5	78%	
Canada	Rachel Homan	9	4	5	68	59	40	36	10	12	81%	
Switzerland	Silvana Tirinzoni	9	4	5	60	55	34	37	12	7	78%	
United States	Nina Roth	9	4	5	56	65	38	39	7	6	78%	
Olympic Athletes from Russia	Victoria Moiseeva	9	2	7	45	76	34	40	8	6	76%	
Denmark	Madeleine Dupont	9	1	8	50	72	32	41	10	6	73%	

Round-robin

China had a bye in draws 4, 8, and 12.

Draw 1

Wednesday, 14 February, 14:05

Sheet D	1	2	3	4	5	6	7	8	9	10	Final
Switzerland (Tirinzoni)	1	0	0	0	0	1	0	0	X	X	2
China (Wang) 🔨	0	2	1	1	0	0	0	3	X	X	7

Draw 2

Thursday, 15 February, 09:05

Sheet C	1	2	3	4	5	6	7	8	9	10	11	Final
China (Wang)	0	2	1	0	0	1	0	2	0	0	0	6
Olympic Athletes from Russia (Moiseeva) 🔨	1	0	0	2	0	0	1	0	0	2	1	7

Draw 3

Thursday, 15 February, 20:05

Sheet A	1	2	3	4	5	6	7	8	9	10	11	Final
China (Wang)	0	1	0	3	0	1	0	1	0	1	0	7
Great Britain (Muirhead) 🔨	1	0	1	0	1	0	2	0	2	0	1	8

Draw 5

Saturday, 17 February, 09:05

Sheet C	1	2	3	4	5	6	7	8	9	10	11	Final
Japan (Fujisawa) 🔨	2	1	0	1	0	1	0	0	0	1	0	6
China (Wang)	0	0	2	0	1	0	0	3	0	0	1	7

Draw 6

Saturday, 17 February, 20:05

Sheet B	1	2	3	4	5	6	7	8	9	10	Final
China (Wang) 🔨	4	0	0	1	0	0	1	0	4	X	10
Denmark (Dupont)	0	1	3	0	2	0	0	1	0	X	7

Draw 7

Sunday, 18 February, 14:05

Sheet D	1	2	3	4	5	6	7	8	9	10	Final
China (Wang)	0	1	0	1	0	2	1	0	X	X	5
South Korea (Kim) 🔨	3	0	3	0	4	0	0	2	X	X	12

Draw 9

Monday, 19 February, 20:05

Sheet C	1	2	3	4	5	6	7	8	9	10	Final
China (Wang)	0	1	0	2	0	0	0	1	X	X	4
United States (Roth) 🔨	3	0	4	0	2	0	1	0	X	X	10

Draw 10

Tuesday, 20 February, 14:05

Sheet A	1	2	3	4	5	6	7	8	9	10	Final
Canada (Homan) 🔨	0	0	1	2	0	1	0	0	1	0	5
China (Wang)	0	2	0	0	3	0	0	1	0	1	7

Draw 11

Wednesday, 21 February, 09:05

Sheet B	1	2	3	4	5	6	7	8	9	10	Final
Sweden (Hasselborg) 🔨	0	2	1	0	2	0	0	3	0	X	8
China (Wang)	0	0	0	1	0	2	0	0	1	X	4

=== Mixed doubles tournament ===
Based on results from the 2016 World Mixed Doubles Curling Championship and 2017 World Mixed Doubles Curling Championship, China had qualified their mixed doubles as the highest ranked nations.

Final round robin standings
Team	Athletes	Pld	W	L	PF	PA	EW	EL	BE	SE	S%	Qualification
Canada	Kaitlyn Lawes / John Morris	7	6	1	52	26	28	20	0	9	80%	Playoffs
Switzerland	Jenny Perret / Martin Rios	7	5	2	45	40	29	26	0	10	71%	Playoffs
Olympic Athletes from Russia	Anastasia Bryzgalova / Alexander Krushelnitskiy	7	4	3	36	44	26	27	1	7	67%	Playoffs
Norway	Kristin Skaslien / Magnus Nedregotten	7	4	3	39	43	26	25	1	8	74%	Tiebreaker
China	Wang Rui / Ba Dexin	7	4	3	47	42	27	27	1	6	72%	Tiebreaker
South Korea	Jang Hye-ji / Lee Ki-jeong	7	2	5	40	40	23	29	1	7	67%	
United States	Rebecca Hamilton / Matt Hamilton	7	2	5	37	43	26	25	0	9	74%	
Finland	Oona Kauste / Tomi Rantamäki	7	1	6	35	53	23	29	0	6	67%	

Draw 1

Thursday, February 8, 9:05

Sheet D	1	2	3	4	5	6	7	8	9	Final
China (Wang / Ba) 🔨	1	0	0	2	0	1	0	1	0	5
Switzerland (Perret / Rios)	0	1	1	0	1	0	2	0	2	7

Draw 2

Thursday, February 8, 20:04

Sheet B	1	2	3	4	5	6	7	8	9	Final
South Korea (Jang / Lee)	0	1	0	0	4	0	2	0	0	7
China (Wang / Ba) 🔨	2	0	3	1	0	1	0	0	1	8

Draw 3

Friday, February 9, 8:35

Sheet C	1	2	3	4	5	6	7	8	Final
China (Wang / Ba)	0	2	0	1	0	1	0	X	4
Canada (Lawes / Morris) 🔨	3	0	4	0	1	0	2	X	10

Draw 4

Friday, February 9, 13:35

Sheet B	1	2	3	4	5	6	7	8	9	Final
China (Wang / Ba)	0	0	0	3	0	0	1	1	0	5
Olympic Athletes from Russia (Bryzgalova / Krushelnitskiy) 🔨	1	1	1	0	1	1	0	0	1	6

Draw 5

Saturday, February 10, 9:05

Sheet A	1	2	3	4	5	6	7	8	Final
China (Wang / Ba) 🔨	0	1	0	1	1	1	0	2	6
United States (R. Hamilton / M. Hamilton)	2	0	1	0	0	0	1	0	4

Draw 6

Saturday, February 10, 20:04

Sheet D	1	2	3	4	5	6	7	8	Final
Finland (Kauste / Rantamäki) 🔨	0	3	0	1	0	1	0	X	5
China (Wang / Ba)	3	0	1	0	4	0	2	X	10

Draw 7

Sunday, February 11, 9:05

Sheet A	1	2	3	4	5	6	7	8	Final
Norway (Skaslien / Nedregotten)	0	1	1	0	1	0	X	X	3
China (Wang / Ba) 🔨	1	0	0	3	0	5	X	X	9

Tiebreaker

Sunday, February 11, 20:05

Team	1	2	3	4	5	6	7	8	Final
China (Wang / Ba) 🔨	2	0	1	0	2	0	2	0	7
Norway (Skaslien / Nedregotten)	0	3	0	1	0	4	0	1	9

== Figure skating ==
China qualified 11 figure skaters (6 men and 5 women), based on its placement at the 2017 World Figure Skating Championships in Helsinki, Finland.

Individual

Athlete	Event	SP		FS		Total	
Athlete	Event	Points	Rank	Points	Rank	Points	Rank
Jin Boyang	Men's singles	103.32	4 Q	194.45	5	297.77	4
Yan Han	Men's singles	80.63	19 Q	132.38	23	213.01	23
Li Xiangning	Ladies' singles	52.46	24 Q	101.97	20	154.43	22

Mixed

Athlete	Event	SP / SD		FS / FD		Total	
Athlete	Event	Points	Rank	Points	Rank	Points	Rank
Peng Cheng / Jin Yang	Pairs	62.61	17	Did not advance			
Sui Wenjing / Han Cong	Pairs	82.39	1 Q	153.08	3	235.47	2nd place, silver medalist(s)
Yu Xiaoyu / Zhang Hao	Pairs	75.58	5 Q	128.52	11	204.10	8
Wang Shiyue / Liu Xinyu	Ice dancing	57.81	22	Did not advance			

Team event

Athlete	Event	Short program/Short dance						Free skate/Free dance					
Athlete	Event	Men's	Ladies'	Pairs	Ice dance	Total		Men's	Ladies'	Pairs	Ice dance	Total	
Athlete	Event	Points Team points	Points Team points	Points Team points	Points Team points	Points	Rank	Points Team points	Points Team points	Points Team points	Points Team points	Points	Rank
Yan Han (M); Li Xiangning (L); Yu Xiaoyu / Zhang Hao (P); Wang Shiyue / Liu Xinyu (I)	Team event	77.10; 4	58.62; 4	69.17; 6	56.98; 4	18	6	Did not advance					

== Freestyle skiing ==
China qualified six male and nine female freestyle skiers.

Aerials

Athlete	Event	Qualification				Final					
Athlete	Event	Jump 1		Jump 2		Jump 1		Jump 2		Jump 3	
Athlete	Event	Points	Rank	Points	Rank	Points	Rank	Points	Rank	Points	Rank
Jia Zongyang	Men's aerials	126.55	3 QF	Bye		118.55	9 Q	128.76	1 Q	128.05	2nd place, silver medalist(s)
Liu Zhongqing	Men's aerials	107.08	16	123.08	4 Q	119.47	8 Q	94.57	9	Did not advance	
Qi Guangpu	Men's aerials	126.70	2 QF	Bye		127.44	1 Q	122.17	7	Did not advance	
Wang Xindi	Men's aerials	121.24	10	96.38	8	Did not advance					
Kong Fanyu	Women's aerials	89.77	7	95.12	2 Q	89.77	4 Q	97.29	1 Q	70.14	3rd place, bronze medalist(s)
Xu Mengtao	Women's aerials	99.37	3 QF	Bye		91.00	2 Q	59.25	9	Did not advance	
Yan Ting	Women's aerials	80.95	13	82.94	9	Did not advance					
Zhang Xin	Women's aerials	90.24	6 QF	Bye		87.25	6 Q	94.11	2 Q	95.52	2nd place, silver medalist(s)

Halfpipe

Athlete	Event	Qualification				Final				
Athlete	Event	Run 1	Run 2	Best	Rank	Run 1	Run 2	Run 3	Best	Rank
Kong Xiangrui	Men's halfpipe	47.40	50.80	50.80	23	Did not advance				
Mao Bingqiang	Men's halfpipe	53.00	54.60	54.60	20	Did not advance				
Chai Hong	Women's halfpipe	58.00	63.60	63.60	19	Did not advance				
Wu Meng	Women's halfpipe	53.40	61.00	61.00	20	Did not advance				
Zhang Kexin	Women's halfpipe	80.60	81.00	81.00	8 Q	73.00	55.40	71.00	73.00	9

Moguls

Athlete	Event	Qualification								Final											
Athlete	Event	Run 1				Run 2				Run 1				Run 2				Run 3			
Athlete	Event	Time	Points	Total	Rank	Time	Points	Total	Rank	Time	Points	Total	Rank	Time	Points	Total	Rank	Time	Points	Total	Rank
Guan Ziyan	Women's moguls	36.30	41.02	48.11	28	35.50	43.80	51.80	18	Did not advance											
Wang Jin	Women's moguls	34.87	42.59	51.29	27	35.01	34.51	51.29	19	Did not advance											

== Short track speed skating ==
According to the ISU Special Olympic Qualification Rankings, China had qualified a full squad of 5 men and 5 women each.

Men

Athlete	Event	Heat		Quarterfinal		Semifinal		Final	
Athlete	Event	Time	Rank	Time	Rank	Time	Rank	Time	Rank
Han Tianyu	500 m	40.744	2 Q	1:14.891	3	Did not advance			
Han Tianyu	1000 m	PEN		Did not advance					
Han Tianyu	1500 m	2:38.865	5 ADV	—N/a		2:11.827	4 FB	2:26.281	8
Ren Ziwei	500 m	40.294	1 Q	40.032 OR	1 Q	40.418	3 FB	40.694	6
Ren Ziwei	1000 m	PEN		Did not advance					
Wu Dajing	500 m	40.264 OR	1 Q	39.800 WR	1 Q	40.087	1 FA	39.584 WR	1st place, gold medalist(s)
Wu Dajing	1000 m	1:23.463	2 Q	PEN		Did not advance			
Wu Dajing	1500 m	2:15.823	3 Q	—N/a		PEN		Did not advance	
Xu Hongzhi	1500 m	2:35.641	5 ADV	—N/a		2:19.310	6	Did not advance	
Chen Dequan; Han Tianyu; Ren Ziwei; Wu Dajing; Xu Hongzhi	5000 m relay	—N/a				6:36.605 OR	1 FA	6:32.035	2nd place, silver medalist(s)

Women

Athlete	Event	Heat		Quarterfinal		Semifinal		Final	
Athlete	Event	Time	Rank	Time	Rank	Time	Rank	Time	Rank
Fan Kexin	500 m	43.350	1 Q	43.485	2 Q	PEN		Did not advance	
Han Yutong	500 m	43.719	2 Q	43.627	3	Did not advance			
Han Yutong	1000 m	PEN		Did not advance					
Han Yutong	1500 m	2:31.158	1 Q	—N/a		2:22.826	3 FB	2:36.548	9
Li Jinyu	1000 m	1:32.335	1 Q	1:30.175	3	Did not advance			
Li Jinyu	1500 m	2:25.034	3 Q	—N/a		2:33.005	4 AA	2:25.703	2nd place, silver medalist(s)
Qu Chunyu	500 m	42.971	2 Q	42.954	1 Q	PEN		Did not advance	
Qu Chunyu	1000 m	1:31.279	2 Q	1:31.284	2 Q	PEN		Did not advance	
Zhou Yang	1500 m	2:29.587	2 Q	—N/a		2:23.485	3 FB	2:35.241	8
Fan Kexin; Han Yutong; Li Jinyu; Qu Chunyu; Zhou Yang	3000 m relay	—N/a				4:05.315 OR	1 FA	PEN	

Qualification legend: ADV – Advanced due to being impeded by another skater; FA – Qualify to medal round; FB – Qualify to consolation round; OR – Olympic record; WR – World record

== Skeleton ==
China qualified one male skeleton athlete, Wenqiang Geng. This marked the country's Winter Olympics debut in the sport.

Athlete	Event	Run 1		Run 2		Run 3		Run 4		Total	
Athlete	Event	Time	Rank	Time	Rank	Time	Rank	Time	Rank	Time	Rank
Geng Wenqiang	Men's	51.51	15	50.87	7	51.18	15	51.09	12	3:24.65	13

== Ski jumping ==
China had qualified one female ski jumper.

Athlete	Event	First round			Final			Total	
Athlete	Event	Distance	Points	Rank	Distance	Points	Rank	Points	Rank
Chang Xinyue	Women's normal hill	83.0	69.6	26 Q	84.5	85.3	18	154.9	20

== Snowboarding ==
Freestyle

Athlete	Event	Qualification				Final				
Athlete	Event	Run 1	Run 2	Best	Rank	Run 1	Run 2	Run 3	Best	Rank
Shi Wancheng	Men's halfpipe	10.00	11.75	11.75	29	Did not advance				
Zhang Yiwei	Men's halfpipe	32.50	74.00	74.00	15	Did not advance				
Cai Xuetong	Women's halfpipe	65.75	69.00	69.00	6 Q	20.50	41.25	76.50	76.50	5
Li Shuang	Women's halfpipe	24.50	9.25	24.50	22	Did not advance				
Liu Jiayu	Women's halfpipe	87.75	41.00	87.75	2 Q	85.50	89.75	49.00	89.75	2nd place, silver medalist(s)
Qiu Leng	Women's halfpipe	50.75	53.75	53.75	16	Did not advance				

Qualification Legend: QF – Qualify directly to final; QS – Qualify to semifinal

Parallel

Athlete	Event	Qualification		Round of 16	Quarterfinal	Semifinal	Final	
Athlete	Event	Time	Rank	Opposition Time	Opposition Time	Opposition Time	Opposition Time	Rank
Gong Naiying	Women's giant slalom	1:36.36	26	Did not advance				
Xu Xiaoxiao	Women's giant slalom	DSQ		Did not advance				
Zang Ruxin	Women's giant slalom	1:35.26	22	Did not advance				

Qualification Legend: W – Winner; L – Loser

== Speed skating ==
China earned the following quotas at the conclusion of the four World Cups used for qualification.

Men

Athlete	Event	Race	
Athlete	Event	Time	Rank
Gao Tingyu	500 m	34.65	3rd place, bronze medalist(s)
Xiakaini Aerchenghazi	1500 m	1:50.16	32
Xie Jiaxuan	500 m	35.545	31
Yang Tao	500 m	35.41	27
Yang Tao	1000 m	1:10.10	26

Women

Athlete	Event	Race	
Athlete	Event	Time	Rank
Hao Jiachen	1500 m	1:59.58	20
Hao Jiachen	3000 m	4:15.56	21
Liu Jing	3000 m	4:20.95	24
Tian Ruining	500 m	38.86	20
Tian Ruining	1000 m	1:16.69	21
Tian Ruining	1500 m	2:00.29	23
Yu Jing	500 m	37.81	9
Yu Jing	1000 m	1:16.36	17
Zhang Hong	500 m	38.39	15
Zhang Hong	1000 m	1:15.67	11

Mass start

Athlete	Event	Semifinal			Final		
Athlete	Event	Points	Time	Rank	Points	Time	Rank
Wang Hongli	Men's mass start	0	8:00.97	12	Did not advance		
Guo Dan	Women's mass start	43	8:54.20	2 Q	0	8:33.90	10
Li Dan	Women's mass start	24	8:32.49	3 Q	6	8:50.48	5

Team pursuit

Athlete	Event	Quarterfinal		Semifinal		Final	
Athlete	Event	Opposition Time	Rank	Opposition Time	Rank	Opposition Time	Rank
Han Mei; Hao Jiachen; Li Dan; Guo Dan (reserve); Liu Jing (reserve)	Women's team pursuit	Japan; L 3:00.01	5 FC	Did not advance		Germany; W 3:00.04	5

== See also ==
- China at the 2017 Asian Winter Games
- China at the 2018 Winter Paralympics
