= Aileen Frisch =

South Korean luger

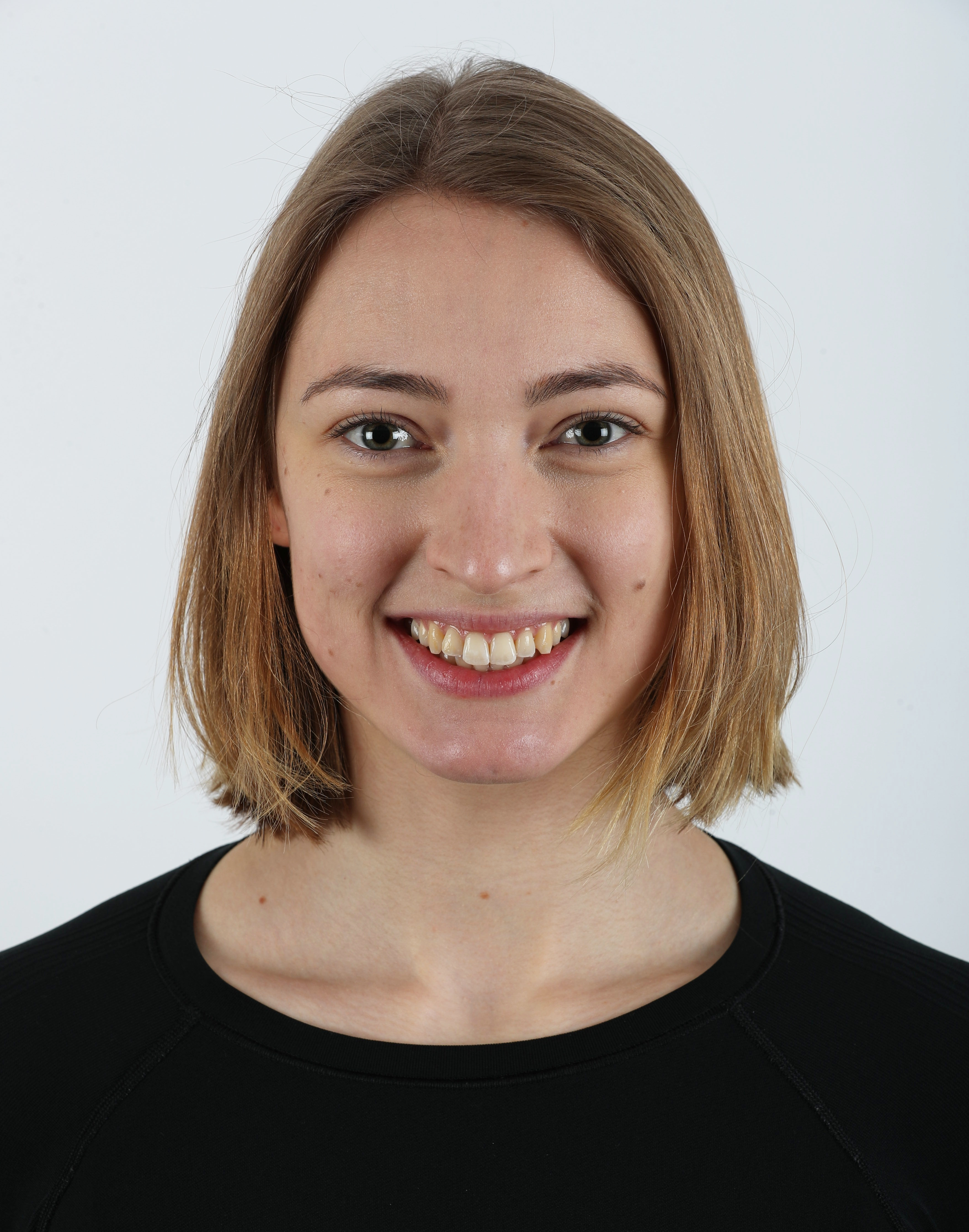
- Frisch in 2018

Personal information
- Full name: Aileen Christina Frisch
- Nationality: (South Korea) South Korean
- Born: 25 August 1992 (age 34) Lebach, Germany
- Height: 1.75 m (5 ft 9 in)
- Weight: 69 kg (152 lb)

Sport
- Country: Germany (-2015); South Korea (2016-)
- Sport: Luge
- Event: Singles
- Coached by: Steffen Sartor (GER)

Korean name
- Hangul: 프리쉐아일린크리스티나
- RR: Peuriswe Ailrinkeuriseutina
- MR: P'ŭriswe Aillink'ŭrisŭt'ina

Aileen Christina Frisch (born 25 August 1992) is a South Korean luger. Frisch competed at the 2018 Winter Olympics and 2022 Winter Olympics for South Korea.

== Sports career ==
In 2012, Frisch became the world junior female singles luge champion, competing as a German.

Frisch failed to make the German luge team for the 2014 Winter Olympics.

She retired from luging in 2015 at age 22. After her retirement, she was contacted by German coaches hired by South Korea to become a naturalized South Korean and join the South Korean luge team. At first, she refused, but in 2016, she consented and acceded to a second request when she started missing the competitions. In December 2016, she became a South Korean citizen so she could legally compete on the South Korea team at the 2018 Winter Olympics. She also competed at the 2022 Winter Olympics.

== See also ==
- South Korea at the 2018 Winter Olympics
