= Short-track speed skating at the 2018 Winter Olympics – Women's 1500 metres =

Women’s 1500 metres at the XXIII Olympic Winter Games
- Venue: Gangneung Ice Arena; Gangneung, South Korea
- Dates: 17 February 2018
- Competitors: 36 from 17 nations
- Winning time: 2:24.948

Medalists
1st place, gold medalist(s)		Choi Min-jeong	South Korea
2nd place, silver medalist(s)		Li Jinyu	China
3rd place, bronze medalist(s)		Kim Boutin	Canada

The Women's 1500 metres in short track speed skating at the 2018 Winter Olympics took place on 17 February 2018 at the Gangneung Ice Arena in Gangneung, South Korea.

In the victory ceremony, the medals were presented by Uğur Erdener, member of the International Olympic Committee, accompanied by Jan Dijkema, President of the International Skating Union.

== Records ==
Prior to this competition, the existing world and Olympic records were as follows.

World record	Choi Min-jeong (KOR)	2:14.354	Salt Lake City, United States	12 November 2016
Olympic record	Zhou Yang (CHN)	2:16.993	Vancouver, Canada	20 February 2010

No new records were established during the competition.

== Results ==
=== Heats ===
Q – qualified for the semifinals
ADV – advanced
PEN – penalty

Rank	Heat	Name	Country	Time	Notes
1	1	Arianna Fontana	Italy	2:28.494	Q
2	1	Jorien ter Mors	Netherlands	2:28.587	Q
3	1	Sumire Kikuchi	Japan	2:29.665	Q
4	1	Kim Iong-a	Kazakhstan	2:29.875	
5	1	Shim Suk-hee	South Korea	2:39.984	
	1	Sára Bácskai	Hungary		PEN
1	2	Han Yutong	China	2:31.158	Q
2	2	Marianne St-Gelais	Canada	2:31.274	Q
3	2	Martina Valcepina	Italy	2:31.370	Q
4	2	Kathryn Thomson	Great Britain	2:32.891	
5	2	Anna Seidel	Germany	2:56.976	ADV
	2	Jessica Kooreman	United States		PEN
1	3	Suzanne Schulting	Netherlands	2:27.730	Q
2	3	Deanna Lockett	Australia	2:28.996	Q
3	3	Charlotte Gilmartin	Great Britain	2:29.005	Q
4	3	Michaela Sejpalová	Czech Republic	2:30.012	
5	3	Cheyenne Goh	Singapore	2:36.971	
	3	Ekaterina Efremenkova	Olympic Athletes from Russia		PEN
1	4	Kim A-lang	South Korea	2:20.891	Q
2	4	Kim Boutin	Canada	2:21.149	Q
3	4	Véronique Pierron	France	2:22.119	Q
4	4	Magdalena Warakomska	Poland	2:23.693	
	4	Anastassiya Krestova	Kazakhstan		PEN
	4	Yuki Kikuchi	Japan		PEN
1	5	Elise Christie	Great Britain	2:29.316	Q
2	5	Zhou Yang	China	2:29.587	Q
3	5	Valérie Maltais	Canada	2:29.877	Q
4	5	Tifany Huot-Marchand	France	2:29.996	
5	5	Bianca Walter	Germany	2:30.819	
6	5	Maame Biney	United States	2:31.819	
1	6	Choi Min-jeong	South Korea	2:24.595	Q
2	6	Petra Jászapáti	Hungary	2:25.022	Q
3	6	Li Jinyu	China	2:25.034	Q
4	6	Sofia Prosvirnova	Olympic Athletes from Russia	2:25.553	
5	6	Lana Gehring	United States	2:27.336	
6	6	Shione Kaminaga	Japan	2:28.719	

=== Semifinals ===
QA – qualified for Final A
QB – qualified for Final B
ADV – advanced
PEN – penalty

Rank	Semifinal	Name	Country	Time	Notes
1	1	Kim A-lang	South Korea	2:22.691	QA
2	1	Kim Boutin	Canada	2:22.799	QA
3	1	Han Yutong	China	2:22.826	QB
4	1	Martina Valcepina	Italy	2:24.171	QB
5	1	Veronique Pierron	France	2:28.023	
6	1	Anna Seidel	Germany	3:00.658	
	1	Marianne St-Gelais	Canada		PEN
1	2	Jorien ter Mors	Netherlands	2:34.385	QA
2	2	Arianna Fontana	Italy	2:34.489	QA
3	2	Sumire Kikuchi	Japan	2:34.526	QB
4	2	Suzanne Schulting	Netherlands	2:34.632	QB
5	2	Charlotte Gilmartin	Great Britain	3:00.691	
6	2	Deanna Lockett	Australia	3:01.928	
1	3	Choi Min-jeong	South Korea	2:22.295	QA
2	3	Petra Jászapáti	Hungary	2:23.210	QA
3	3	Zhou Yang	China	2:23.485	QB
4	3	Li Jinyu	China	2:33.005	ADV
	3	Valérie Maltais	Canada		PEN
	3	Elise Christie	Great Britain		PEN

=== Final B ===
Rank	Name	Country	Time	Notes
8	Zhou Yang	China	2:35.241	
9	Han Yutong	China	2:36.548	
10	Suzanne Schulting	Netherlands	2:37.163	
11	Sumire Kikuchi	Japan	2:54.450	
12	Martina Valcepina	Italy		PEN

=== Final A ===
The final was held at 21:09.

Rank	Name	Country	Time	Notes
1st place, gold medalist(s)	Choi Min-jeong	South Korea	2:24.948	
2nd place, silver medalist(s)	Li Jinyu	China	2:25.703	
3rd place, bronze medalist(s)	Kim Boutin	Canada	2:25.834	
4	Kim A-lang	South Korea	2:25.941	
5	Jorien ter Mors	Netherlands	2:25.955	
6	Petra Jászapáti	Hungary	2:26.138	
7	Arianna Fontana	Italy	2:27.475	
