= Speed skating at the 2018 Winter Olympics – Women's mass start =

Women's mass start at the XXIII Olympic Winter Games
- Venue: Gangneung Oval, Gangneung, South Korea
- Date: 24 February 2018
- Competitors: 24 from 15 nations
- Winning points: 60

Medalists
1st place, gold medalist(s)		Nana Takagi	Japan
2nd place, silver medalist(s)		Kim Bo-reum	South Korea
3rd place, bronze medalist(s)		Irene Schouten	Netherlands

The women's mass start speed skating competition of the 2018 Winter Olympics was held 24 February 2018 at Gangneung Oval in Gangneung. This was the first time the mass start has been introduced to the Olympics. The competition was held as a points race.

== Format ==
There were 12 skaters in each semifinal. The eight best finishers from each of two semi-finals competed in the final. Each race consisted of 16 laps. Three leaders after last 16th lap received 60, 40 and 20 points respectively. Three intermediate sprints award points to the first three competitors (5 points, 3 points, 1 point) after 4th, 8th and 12th laps. Event rankings were based on points gained in sprints, then by finish time for athletes with equal points. In the Gangneung Oval, the accurate distance of 16 laps of the warm-up lane, is 5,695.175 m (355.948 m each lap).

== Results ==
All races were skated on the same day, 24 February 2018. The first semifinal was held at 20:00, the second at 20:15. The final was on the same day at 21:30.

=== Semifinals ===
Rank	Semifinal	Name	Country	Points	Time	Notes
1	1	Francesca Lollobrigida	Italy	68	8:54.19	Q
2	1	Guo Dan	China	43	8:54.20	Q
3	1	Keri Morrison	Canada	21	8:54.25	Q
4	1	Irene Schouten	Netherlands	5	8:54.94	Q
5	1	Nana Takagi	Japan	5	8:55.14	Q
6	1	Kim Bo-reum	South Korea	4	9:22.21	Q
7	1	Mia Manganello	United States	1	8:54.52	Q
8	1	Maryna Zuyeva	Belarus	0	8:54.38	Q
9	1	Elena Møller Rigas	Denmark	0	8:54.39	
10	1	Laura Gómez	Colombia	0	8:54.99	
11	1	Magdalena Czyszczoń	Poland	0	8:56.66	
12	1	Ramona Härdi	Switzerland	0	DNF	
1	2	Nikola Zdráhalová	Czech Republic	60	8:32.22	Q
2	2	Annouk van der Weijden	Netherlands	40	8:32.31	Q
3	2	Li Dan	China	24	8:32.49	Q
4	2	Claudia Pechstein	Germany	5	8:35.59	Q
5	2	Heather Bergsma	United States	5	8:38.19	Q
6	2	Francesca Bettrone	Italy	5	8:38.69	Q
7	2	Saskia Alusalu	Estonia	3	8:35.58	Q
8	2	Luiza Złotkowska	Poland	3	9:08.41	Q
9	2	Park Ji-woo	South Korea	1	8:33.43	
10	2	Ivanie Blondin	Canada	1	8:53.92	
11	2	Tatsiana Mikhailava	Belarus	0	8:33.93	
12	2	Ayano Sato	Japan	0	DNF	

=== Final ===
Rank	Name	Country	Points	Time	Notes
1st place, gold medalist(s)	Nana Takagi	Japan	60	8:32.87	
2nd place, silver medalist(s)	Kim Bo-reum	South Korea	40	8:32.99	
3rd place, bronze medalist(s)	Irene Schouten	Netherlands	20	8:33.02	
4	Saskia Alusalu	Estonia	15	8:47.46	
5	Li Dan	China	6	8:50.48	
6	Maryna Zuyeva	Belarus	3	8:41.73	
7	Francesca Lollobrigida	Italy	1	8:33.30	
8	Nikola Zdráhalová	Czech Republic	1	8:41.35	
9	Luiza Złotkowska	Poland	1	8:47.34	
10	Guo Dan	China	0	8:33.90	
11	Heather Bergsma	United States	0	8:35.80	
12	Keri Morrison	Canada	0	8:41.38	
13	Claudia Pechstein	Germany	0	8:41.45	
14	Annouk van der Weijden	Netherlands	0	8:42.19	
15	Mia Manganello	United States	0	8:54.40	
16	Francesca Bettrone	Italy	0	9:04.82	
