= Li Jinyu (speed skater) =

Chinese short-track speed skater

Personal information
- Nationality: China
- Born: 30 January 2001 (age 25) Heilongjiang, China
- Height: 1.61 m (5 ft 3 in)
- Weight: 58 kg (128 lb)

Sport
- Country: China
- Sport: Short track speed skating
Medal record
Olympic Games
Silver medal – second place	2018 Pyeongchang	1500 m
World Championships
Silver medal – second place	2018 Montreal	3000 m
Bronze medal – third place	2018 Montreal	Overall
Bronze medal – third place	2018 Montreal	1000 m

Li Jinyu
- Chinese: 李靳宇
Transcriptions
Standard Mandarin
- Hanyu Pinyin: Lǐ Jìnyǔ
- IPA: [lì tɕîn ỳ]

Li Jinyu (born 30 January 2001 in Heilongjiang) is a female Chinese short track speed skater. Most notably, she competed at the 2018 Winter Olympics for China.
