= Japan at the 2018 Winter Olympics =

- Flag of Japan
- IOC code: JPN
- NOC: Japanese Olympic Committee
- Website: www.joc.or.jp

in Pyeongchang, South Korea February 9–25, 2018
- Competitors: 124 in 13 sports
- Flag bearer: Noriaki Kasai (opening)
- Medals Ranked 11th: Gold 4 Silver 5 Bronze 4 Total 13

Winter Olympics appearances (overview)
- 1928; 1932; 1936; 1948; 1952; 1956; 1960; 1964; 1968; 1972; 1976; 1980; 1984; 1988; 1992; 1994; 1998; 2002; 2006; 2010; 2014; 2018; 2022; 2026

Japan competed at the 2018 Winter Olympics in Pyeongchang, South Korea, from 9 to 25 February 2018, with 124 competitors in 13 sports. They won 13 medals in total, four gold, five silver and four bronze, ranking 11th in the medal table. Six medals of those were won in the speed skating events.

Ski jumper Noriaki Kasai was chosen to be the flag bearer during the opening ceremony. On 9 February 2018, on the opening day of the Games, he became the first athlete in history to participate in 8 different Winter Olympics. The previous record was from the Russian luger Albert Demchenko, with 7 participations.

== Medalists ==
| Medal | Name | Sport | Event | Date |
|---|---|---|---|---|
| Gold | Yuzuru Hanyu | Figure skating | Men's singles | 17 February |
| Gold | Nao Kodaira | Speed skating | Women's 500 metres | 18 February |
| Gold | Miho Takagi; Ayaka Kikuchi; Ayano Sato; Nana Takagi | Speed skating | Women's team pursuit | 21 February |
| Gold | Nana Takagi | Speed skating | Women's mass start | 24 February |
| Silver | Miho Takagi | Speed skating | Women's 1500 metres | 12 February |
| Silver | Akito Watabe | Nordic combined | Individual normal hill/10 km | 14 February |
| Silver | Ayumu Hirano | Snowboarding | Men's halfpipe | 14 February |
| Silver | Nao Kodaira | Speed skating | Women's 1000 metres | 14 February |
| Silver | Shoma Uno | Figure skating | Men's singles | 17 February |
| Bronze | Daichi Hara | Freestyle skiing | Men's moguls | 12 February |
| Bronze | Sara Takanashi | Ski jumping | Women's normal hill individual | 12 February |
| Bronze | Miho Takagi | Speed skating | Women's 1000 metres | 14 February |
| Bronze | Satsuki Fujisawa; Chinami Yoshida; Yumi Suzuki; Yurika Yoshida; Mari Motohashi | Curling | Women's curling | 24 February |

Medals by sport
| Sport | 1st place, gold medalist(s) | 2nd place, silver medalist(s) | 3rd place, bronze medalist(s) | Total |
| Speed skating | 3 | 2 | 1 | 6 |
| Figure skating | 1 | 1 | 0 | 2 |
| Nordic combined | 0 | 1 | 0 | 1 |
| Snowboarding | 0 | 1 | 0 | 1 |
| Curling | 0 | 0 | 1 | 1 |
| Freestyle skiing | 0 | 0 | 1 | 1 |
| Ski jumping | 0 | 0 | 1 | 1 |
| Total | 4 | 5 | 4 | 13 |

== Competitors ==
The following is the list of the number of competitors participating at the Games per sport/discipline.

| Sport | Men | Women | Total |
|---|---|---|---|
| Alpine skiing | 2 | 2 | 4 |
| Biathlon | 1 | 5 | 6 |
| Cross-country skiing | 1 | 1 | 2 |
| Curling | 5 | 5 | 10 |
| Figure skating | 5 | 4 | 9 |
| Freestyle skiing | 6 | 5 | 11 |
| Ice hockey | 0 | 23 | 23 |
| Nordic combined | 5 | 0 | 5 |
| Short track speed skating | 5 | 5 | 10 |
| Skeleton | 2 | 1 | 3 |
| Ski jumping | 5 | 4 | 9 |
| Snowboarding | 7 | 9 | 16 |
| Speed skating | 8 | 8 | 16 |
| Total | 52 | 72 | 124 |

== Alpine skiing ==
| Athlete | Event | Run 1 | | Run 2 | | Total | |
| Athlete | Event | Time | Rank | Time | Rank | Time | Rank |
|---|---|---|---|---|---|---|---|
| Tomoya Ishii | Men's giant slalom | 1:12.43 | 35 | 1:12.35 | 29 | 2:24.78 | 30 |
| Naoki Yuasa | Men's slalom | 52.89 | 36 | DNF | | | |
| Asa Ando | Women's slalom | DNF | | | | | |
| Haruna Ishikawa | Women's giant slalom | 1:16.49 | 33 | 1:12.50 | 31 | 2:28.99 | 33 |

== Biathlon ==
Based on their Nations Cup ranking in the 2016–17 Biathlon World Cup, Japan has qualified 1 man and 5 women.

| Athlete | Event | Time | Misses | Rank |
|---|---|---|---|---|
| Mikito Tachizaki | Men's sprint | 27:27.1 | 3 (0+3) | 84 |
| Mikito Tachizaki | Men's individual | 54:11.5 | 3 (0+1+2+0) | 64 |
| Sari Furuya | Women's sprint | 23:21.5 | 2 (1+1) | 49 |
| Sari Furuya | Women's pursuit | 37:02.1 | 5 (2+1+1+1) | 54 |
| Sari Furuya | Women's individual | 53:11.0 | 9 (2+2+3+2) | 85 |
| Asuka Hachisuka | Women's individual | 50:30.2 | 4 (1+1+1+1) | 81 |
| Rina Mitsuhashi | Women's sprint | 25:53.1 | 5 (3+2) | 85 |
| Fuyuko Tachizaki | Women's sprint | 23:19.7 | 1 (0+1) | 42 |
| Fuyuko Tachizaki | Women's pursuit | 37:07.9 | 7 (2+0+2+3) | 56 |
| Fuyuko Tachizaki | Women's individual | 50:06.9 | 7 (3+1+2+1) | 76 |
| Yurie Tanaka | Women's sprint | 24:21.6 | 2 (1+1) | 68 |
| Yurie Tanaka | Women's individual | 50:28.0 | 5 (2+2+0+1) | 80 |
| Sari Furuya; Rina Mitsuhashi; Fuyuko Tachizaki; Yurie Tanaka | Women's team relay | 1:15:47.7 | 11 (2+9) | 17 |

== Cross-country skiing ==
| Athlete | Event | Classical | | Freestyle | | Total | | |
| Athlete | Event | Time | Rank | Time | Rank | Time | Deficit | Rank |
|---|---|---|---|---|---|---|---|---|
| Keishin Yoshida | Men's 15 km freestyle | —N/a | | | | 34:59.1 | +1:15.2 | 13 |
| Keishin Yoshida | Men's 30 km skiathlon | 41:11.9 | 23 | 36:37.5 | 27 | 1:18:23.0 | +2:03.0 | 25 |
| Keishin Yoshida | Men's 50 km classical | —N/a | | | | 2:17:21.9 | +8:59.8 | 23 |
| Masako Ishida | Women's 10 km freestyle | —N/a | | | | 27:03.5 | +2:03.0 | 18 |
| Masako Ishida | Women's 15 km skiathlon | 21:39.2 | 15 | 19:54.4 | 17 | 42:04.1 | +1:19.2 | 14 |
| Masako Ishida | Women's 30 km classical | —N/a | | | | 1:26:38.4 | +4:20.8 | 10 |

== Curling ==
Japan has qualified their men's and women's team (five athletes per gender), by finishing in the top seven teams in Olympic Qualification points.

Summary

| Team | Event | Group Stage | | | | | | | | | | Tiebreaker | Semifinal | Final / BM | |
| Team | Event | Opposition Score | Opposition Score | Opposition Score | Opposition Score | Opposition Score | Opposition Score | Opposition Score | Opposition Score | Opposition Score | Rank | Opposition Score | Opposition Score | Opposition Score | Rank |
|---|---|---|---|---|---|---|---|---|---|---|---|---|---|---|---|
| Yusuke Morozumi; Tetsuro Shimizu; Tsuyoshi Yamaguchi; Kosuke Morozumi; Kohsuke Hirata | Men's tournament | (Norway) NOR; W 6–4 | (United Kingdom) GBR; L 5–6 | (Switzerland) SUI; L 5–6 | (Italy) ITA; W 6–5 | (United States) USA; W 8–2 | (Sweden) SWE; L 4–11 | (Canada) CAN; L 4–8 | (Denmark) DEN; W 6–4 | (South Korea) KOR; L 4–10 | 8 | Did not advance | | | |
| Satsuki Fujisawa; Chinami Yoshida; Yumi Suzuki; Yurika Yoshida; Mari Motohashi | Women's tournament | (United States) USA; W 10-5 | (Denmark) DEN; W 8–5 | (South Korea) KOR; W 7–5 | (China) CHN; L 6–7 | (International Olympic Committee) OAR; W 10–5 | (Canada) CAN; L 3–8 | (Sweden) SWE; W 5–4 | (United Kingdom) GBR; L 6–8 | (Switzerland) SUI; L 4–8 | 4 Q | BYE | (South Korea) KOR; L 7–8 | (United Kingdom) GBR; W 5–3 | 3rd place, bronze medalist(s) |

=== Men's tournament ===
Final round robin standings
| Team | Skip | Pld | W | L | PF | PA | EW | EL | BE | SE | S% | Qualification |
|---|---|---|---|---|---|---|---|---|---|---|---|---|
| Sweden | Niklas Edin | 9 | 7 | 2 | 62 | 43 | 34 | 28 | 13 | 8 | 87% | Playoffs |
| Canada | Kevin Koe | 9 | 6 | 3 | 56 | 46 | 36 | 34 | 14 | 8 | 87% | Playoffs |
| United States | John Shuster | 9 | 5 | 4 | 67 | 63 | 37 | 39 | 4 | 6 | 80% | Playoffs |
| Great Britain | Kyle Smith | 9 | 5 | 4 | 55 | 60 | 40 | 37 | 8 | 7 | 82% | Tiebreaker |
| Switzerland | Peter de Cruz | 9 | 5 | 4 | 60 | 55 | 39 | 37 | 10 | 6 | 83% | Tiebreaker |
| Norway | Thomas Ulsrud | 9 | 4 | 5 | 52 | 56 | 34 | 39 | 7 | 8 | 82% | |
| South Korea | Kim Chang-min | 9 | 4 | 5 | 65 | 63 | 39 | 39 | 8 | 8 | 82% | |
| Japan | Yusuke Morozumi | 9 | 4 | 5 | 48 | 56 | 33 | 35 | 13 | 5 | 81% | |
| Italy | Joël Retornaz | 9 | 3 | 6 | 50 | 56 | 37 | 38 | 15 | 7 | 81% | |
| Denmark | Rasmus Stjerne | 9 | 2 | 7 | 53 | 70 | 36 | 39 | 12 | 5 | 83% | |

Round-robin

Japan has a bye in draws 1, 4 and 9.

Draw 2

Wednesday, 14 February, 20:05

| Sheet D | 1 | 2 | 3 | 4 | 5 | 6 | 7 | 8 | 9 | 10 | Final |
|---|---|---|---|---|---|---|---|---|---|---|---|
| Norway (Ulsrud) 🔨 | 1 | 0 | 0 | 0 | 1 | 1 | 0 | 1 | 0 | X | 4 |
| Japan (Morozumi) | 0 | 1 | 1 | 1 | 0 | 0 | 2 | 0 | 1 | X | 6 |

Draw 3

Thursday, 15 February, 14:05

| Sheet C | 1 | 2 | 3 | 4 | 5 | 6 | 7 | 8 | 9 | 10 | Final |
|---|---|---|---|---|---|---|---|---|---|---|---|
| Great Britain (Smith) 🔨 | 1 | 0 | 2 | 0 | 0 | 1 | 0 | 1 | 0 | 1 | 6 |
| Japan (Morozumi) | 0 | 1 | 0 | 0 | 1 | 0 | 2 | 0 | 1 | 0 | 5 |

Draw 5

Friday, 16 February, 20:05

| Sheet A | 1 | 2 | 3 | 4 | 5 | 6 | 7 | 8 | 9 | 10 | Final |
|---|---|---|---|---|---|---|---|---|---|---|---|
| Japan (Morozumi) | 0 | 2 | 0 | 1 | 0 | 0 | 0 | 2 | 0 | 0 | 5 |
| Switzerland (de Cruz) 🔨 | 3 | 0 | 1 | 0 | 0 | 1 | 0 | 0 | 0 | 1 | 6 |

Draw 6

Saturday, 17 February, 14:05

| Sheet D | 1 | 2 | 3 | 4 | 5 | 6 | 7 | 8 | 9 | 10 | Final |
|---|---|---|---|---|---|---|---|---|---|---|---|
| Japan (Morozumi) 🔨 | 2 | 0 | 1 | 0 | 2 | 0 | 0 | 0 | 0 | 1 | 6 |
| Italy (Retornaz) | 0 | 1 | 0 | 2 | 0 | 0 | 0 | 1 | 1 | 0 | 5 |

Draw 7

Sunday, 18 February, 09:05

| Sheet B | 1 | 2 | 3 | 4 | 5 | 6 | 7 | 8 | 9 | 10 | Final |
|---|---|---|---|---|---|---|---|---|---|---|---|
| United States (Shuster) | 0 | 0 | 0 | 0 | 2 | 0 | 0 | X | X | X | 2 |
| Japan (Morozumi) 🔨 | 2 | 1 | 1 | 0 | 0 | 2 | 2 | X | X | X | 8 |

Draw 8

Sunday, 18 February, 20:05

| Sheet A | 1 | 2 | 3 | 4 | 5 | 6 | 7 | 8 | 9 | 10 | Final |
|---|---|---|---|---|---|---|---|---|---|---|---|
| Sweden (Edin) 🔨 | 3 | 0 | 2 | 0 | 0 | 1 | 0 | 5 | X | X | 11 |
| Japan (Morozumi) | 0 | 1 | 0 | 0 | 1 | 0 | 2 | 0 | X | X | 4 |

Draw 10

Tuesday, 20 February, 09:05

| Sheet B | 1 | 2 | 3 | 4 | 5 | 6 | 7 | 8 | 9 | 10 | Final |
|---|---|---|---|---|---|---|---|---|---|---|---|
| Japan (Morozumi) | 0 | 2 | 0 | 0 | 1 | 0 | 1 | 0 | 0 | X | 4 |
| Canada (Koe) 🔨 | 1 | 0 | 2 | 1 | 0 | 2 | 0 | 1 | 1 | X | 8 |

Draw 11

Tuesday, 20 February, 20:05

| Sheet C | 1 | 2 | 3 | 4 | 5 | 6 | 7 | 8 | 9 | 10 | Final |
|---|---|---|---|---|---|---|---|---|---|---|---|
| Japan (Morozumi) | 0 | 0 | 3 | 0 | 0 | 2 | 0 | 0 | 0 | 1 | 6 |
| Denmark (Stjerne) 🔨 | 1 | 0 | 0 | 1 | 0 | 0 | 0 | 2 | 0 | 0 | 4 |

Draw 12

Wednesday, 21 February, 14:05

| Sheet D | 1 | 2 | 3 | 4 | 5 | 6 | 7 | 8 | 9 | 10 | Final |
|---|---|---|---|---|---|---|---|---|---|---|---|
| South Korea (Kim) 🔨 | 1 | 0 | 2 | 0 | 0 | 4 | 0 | 3 | X | X | 10 |
| Japan (Morozumi) | 0 | 1 | 0 | 2 | 0 | 0 | 1 | 0 | X | X | 4 |

=== Women's tournament ===
Final round robin standings
| Team | Skip | Pld | W | L | PF | PA | EW | EL | BE | SE | S% | Qualification |
|---|---|---|---|---|---|---|---|---|---|---|---|---|
| South Korea | Kim Eun-jung | 9 | 8 | 1 | 75 | 44 | 41 | 34 | 5 | 15 | 79% | Playoffs |
| Sweden | Anna Hasselborg | 9 | 7 | 2 | 64 | 48 | 42 | 34 | 14 | 13 | 83% | Playoffs |
| Great Britain | Eve Muirhead | 9 | 6 | 3 | 61 | 56 | 39 | 38 | 12 | 6 | 79% | Playoffs |
| Japan | Satsuki Fujisawa | 9 | 5 | 4 | 59 | 55 | 38 | 36 | 10 | 13 | 75% | Playoffs |
| China | Wang Bingyu | 9 | 4 | 5 | 57 | 65 | 35 | 38 | 12 | 5 | 78% | |
| Canada | Rachel Homan | 9 | 4 | 5 | 68 | 59 | 40 | 36 | 10 | 12 | 81% | |
| Switzerland | Silvana Tirinzoni | 9 | 4 | 5 | 60 | 55 | 34 | 37 | 12 | 7 | 78% | |
| United States | Nina Roth | 9 | 4 | 5 | 56 | 65 | 38 | 39 | 7 | 6 | 78% | |
| Olympic Athletes from Russia | Victoria Moiseeva | 9 | 2 | 7 | 45 | 76 | 34 | 40 | 8 | 6 | 76% | |
| Denmark | Madeleine Dupont | 9 | 1 | 8 | 50 | 72 | 32 | 41 | 10 | 6 | 73% | |

Round-robin

Japan has a bye in draws 4, 7 and 11.

Draw 1

Wednesday, 14 February, 14:05

| Sheet A | 1 | 2 | 3 | 4 | 5 | 6 | 7 | 8 | 9 | 10 | Final |
|---|---|---|---|---|---|---|---|---|---|---|---|
| Japan (Fujisawa) | 2 | 2 | 3 | 0 | 1 | 0 | 0 | 1 | 1 | X | 10 |
| United States (Roth) 🔨 | 0 | 0 | 0 | 1 | 0 | 3 | 1 | 0 | 0 | X | 5 |

Draw 2

Thursday, 15 February, 09:05

| Sheet B | 1 | 2 | 3 | 4 | 5 | 6 | 7 | 8 | 9 | 10 | Final |
|---|---|---|---|---|---|---|---|---|---|---|---|
| Denmark (Dupont) | 0 | 0 | 0 | 3 | 0 | 1 | 0 | 0 | 1 | X | 5 |
| Japan (Fujisawa) 🔨 | 0 | 2 | 1 | 0 | 0 | 0 | 3 | 2 | 0 | X | 8 |

Draw 3

Thursday, 15 February, 20:05

| Sheet D | 1 | 2 | 3 | 4 | 5 | 6 | 7 | 8 | 9 | 10 | Final |
|---|---|---|---|---|---|---|---|---|---|---|---|
| South Korea (Kim) 🔨 | 0 | 2 | 0 | 1 | 0 | 1 | 1 | 0 | 0 | 0 | 5 |
| Japan (Fujisawa) | 1 | 0 | 1 | 0 | 1 | 0 | 0 | 1 | 2 | 1 | 7 |

Draw 5

Saturday, 17 February, 09:05

| Sheet C | 1 | 2 | 3 | 4 | 5 | 6 | 7 | 8 | 9 | 10 | 11 | Final |
|---|---|---|---|---|---|---|---|---|---|---|---|---|
| Japan (Fujisawa) 🔨 | 2 | 1 | 0 | 1 | 0 | 1 | 0 | 0 | 0 | 1 | 0 | 6 |
| China (Wang) | 0 | 0 | 2 | 0 | 1 | 0 | 0 | 3 | 0 | 0 | 1 | 7 |

Draw 6

Saturday, 17 February, 20:05

| Sheet A | 1 | 2 | 3 | 4 | 5 | 6 | 7 | 8 | 9 | 10 | Final |
|---|---|---|---|---|---|---|---|---|---|---|---|
| Olympic Athletes from Russia (Moiseeva) 🔨 | 1 | 0 | 2 | 0 | 1 | 0 | 0 | 1 | 0 | X | 5 |
| Japan (Fujisawa) | 0 | 2 | 0 | 2 | 0 | 1 | 3 | 0 | 2 | X | 10 |

Draw 8

Monday, 19 February, 09:05

| Sheet B | 1 | 2 | 3 | 4 | 5 | 6 | 7 | 8 | 9 | 10 | Final |
|---|---|---|---|---|---|---|---|---|---|---|---|
| Japan (Fujisawa) 🔨 | 0 | 1 | 0 | 0 | 0 | 2 | 0 | X | X | X | 3 |
| Canada (Homan) | 1 | 0 | 0 | 1 | 4 | 0 | 2 | X | X | X | 8 |

Draw 9

Monday, 19 February, 20:05

| Sheet D | 1 | 2 | 3 | 4 | 5 | 6 | 7 | 8 | 9 | 10 | Final |
|---|---|---|---|---|---|---|---|---|---|---|---|
| Japan (Fujisawa) 🔨 | 0 | 1 | 0 | 0 | 1 | 0 | 0 | 0 | 2 | 1 | 5 |
| Sweden (Hasselborg) | 0 | 0 | 1 | 1 | 0 | 1 | 0 | 1 | 0 | 0 | 4 |

Draw 10

Tuesday, 20 February, 14:05

| Sheet C | 1 | 2 | 3 | 4 | 5 | 6 | 7 | 8 | 9 | 10 | Final |
|---|---|---|---|---|---|---|---|---|---|---|---|
| Great Britain (Muirhead) 🔨 | 1 | 0 | 1 | 1 | 0 | 3 | 0 | 1 | 1 | 0 | 8 |
| Japan (Fujisawa) | 0 | 3 | 0 | 0 | 0 | 0 | 2 | 0 | 0 | 1 | 6 |

Draw 12

Wednesday, 21 February, 20:05

| Sheet B | 1 | 2 | 3 | 4 | 5 | 6 | 7 | 8 | 9 | 10 | Final |
|---|---|---|---|---|---|---|---|---|---|---|---|
| Switzerland (Tirinzoni) 🔨 | 0 | 2 | 0 | 4 | 0 | 0 | 0 | 1 | 1 | X | 8 |
| Japan (Fujisawa) | 0 | 0 | 1 | 0 | 2 | 0 | 1 | 0 | 0 | X | 4 |

Semifinal

Friday, 23 February, 20:05

| Sheet A | 1 | 2 | 3 | 4 | 5 | 6 | 7 | 8 | 9 | 10 | 11 | Final |
|---|---|---|---|---|---|---|---|---|---|---|---|---|
| South Korea (Kim) 🔨 | 3 | 0 | 1 | 0 | 2 | 0 | 0 | 1 | 0 | 0 | 1 | 8 |
| Japan (Fujisawa) | 0 | 2 | 0 | 1 | 0 | 1 | 0 | 0 | 2 | 1 | 0 | 7 |

Bronze Medal Game

Saturday, 24 February, 20:05

| Sheet B | 1 | 2 | 3 | 4 | 5 | 6 | 7 | 8 | 9 | 10 | Final |
|---|---|---|---|---|---|---|---|---|---|---|---|
| Great Britain (Muirhead) 🔨 | 1 | 0 | 1 | 0 | 1 | 0 | 0 | 0 | 0 | 0 | 3 |
| Japan (Fujisawa) | 0 | 1 | 0 | 1 | 0 | 0 | 0 | 1 | 1 | 1 | 5 |

== Figure skating ==
| Athlete | Event | SP/OD | | FS/FD | | Total | |
| Athlete | Event | Points | Rank | Points | Rank | Points | Rank |
|---|---|---|---|---|---|---|---|
| Yuzuru Hanyu | Men's singles | 111.68 | 1 Q | 206.17 | 2 | 317.85 | 1st place, gold medalist(s) |
| Keiji Tanaka | Men's singles | 80.05 | 20 Q | 164.78 | 15 | 244.83 | 18 |
| Shoma Uno | Men's singles | 104.17 | 3 Q | 202.73 | 3 | 306.90 | 2nd place, silver medalist(s) |
| Satoko Miyahara | Ladies' singles | 75.94 | 4 Q | 146.44 | 4 | 222.38 | 4 |
| Kaori Sakamoto | Ladies' singles | 73.18 | 5 Q | 136.53 | 6 | 209.71 | 6 |
| Miu Suzaki / Ryuichi Kihara | Pairs | 57.74 | 21 | Did not advance | | | |
| Kana Muramoto / Chris Reed | Ice dancing | 63.41 | 15 Q | 97.22 | 13 | 160.63 | 15 |

Team event

| Athlete | Event | Short program/Short dance | | | | | | Free skate/Free dance | | | | | |
| Athlete | Event | Men's | Ladies' | Pairs | Ice dance | Total | | Men's | Ladies' | Pairs | Ice dance | Total | |
| Athlete | Event | Points Team points | Points Team points | Points Team points | Points Team points | Points | Rank | Points Team points | Points Team points | Points Team points | Points Team points | Points | Rank |
|---|---|---|---|---|---|---|---|---|---|---|---|---|---|
| Shoma Uno (M) (SP); Keiji Tanaka (M) (FS); Satoko Miyahara (L) (SP); Kaori Sakamoto (L) (FS); Miu Suzaki / Ryuichi Kihara (P); Kana Muramoto / Chris Reed (ID) | Team event | 103.25; 10 | 68.95; 7 | 57.42; 3 | 62.15; 6 | 26 | 4 | 148.36; 6 | 131.91; 6 | 97.67; 6 | 87.88; 6 | 50 | 5 |

== Freestyle skiing ==
Aerials

| Athlete | Event | Qualification | | | | Final | | | | | |
| Athlete | Event | Jump 1 | | Jump 2 | | Jump 1 | | Jump 2 | | Jump 3 | |
| Athlete | Event | Points | Rank | Points | Rank | Points | Rank | Points | Rank | Points | Rank |
|---|---|---|---|---|---|---|---|---|---|---|---|
| Naoya Tabara | Men's aerials | 103.98 | 17 | 78.73 | 13 | Did not advance | | | | | |

Halfpipe

| Athlete | Event | Qualification | | | | Final | | | | |
| Athlete | Event | Run 1 | Run 2 | Best | Rank | Run 1 | Run 2 | Run 3 | Best | Rank |
|---|---|---|---|---|---|---|---|---|---|---|
| Ayana Onozuka | Women's halfpipe | 74.60 | 84.80 | 84.80 | 5 Q | 50.80 | 77.20 | 82.20 | 82.20 | 5 |
| Saori Suzuki | Women's halfpipe | 69.20 | 71.80 | 71.80 | 14 | Did not advance | | | | |
| Yurie Watabe | Women's halfpipe | 21.20 | 56.60 | 56.60 | 22 | Did not advance | | | | |

Moguls

| Athlete | Event | Qualification | | | | | | | | Final | | | | | | | | | | | |
| Athlete | Event | Run 1 | | | | Run 2 | | | | Run 1 | | | | Run 2 | | | | Run 3 | | | |
| Athlete | Event | Time | Points | Total | Rank | Time | Points | Total | Rank | Time | Points | Total | Rank | Time | Points | Total | Rank | Time | Points | Total | Rank |
|---|---|---|---|---|---|---|---|---|---|---|---|---|---|---|---|---|---|---|---|---|---|
| Sho Endo | Men's moguls | 24.92 | 60.59 | 75.73 | 13 | 25.19 | 60.60 | 75.38 | 7 Q | 24.42 | 66.92 | 82.72 | 1 Q | DNF | | | | Did not advance | | | |
| Daichi Hara | Men's moguls | 25.06 | 65.06 | 80.01 | 6 QF | Bye | | | | 24.75 | 65.93 | 81.29 | 3 Q | 24.41 | 66.49 | 82.30 | 1 Q | 24.90 | 67.03 | 82.19 | 3rd place, bronze medalist(s) |
| Ikuma Horishima | Men's moguls | 23.95 | 63.93 | 80.35 | 5 QF | Bye | | | | 24.09 | 63.41 | 79.64 | 7 Q | DNF | | | | Did not advance | | | |
| Nobuyuki Nishi | Men's moguls | 24.74 | 59.79 | 75.17 | 16 | 25.35 | 60.58 | 75.15 | 9 Q | 25.14 | 31.19 | 46.04 | 19 | Did not advance | | | | | | | |
| Arisa Murata | Women's moguls | 29.90 | 59.83 | 74.13 | 9 QF | Bye | | | | 30.51 | 67.15 | 70.77 | 18 | Did not advance | | | | | | | |

Ski cross

| Athlete | Event | Seeding | | Round of 16 | Quarterfinal | Semifinal | Final | |
| Athlete | Event | Time | Rank | Position | Position | Position | Position | Rank |
|---|---|---|---|---|---|---|---|---|
| Reina Umehara | Women's ski cross | 1:17.81 | 21 | 3 | Did not advance | | | |

Qualification legend: FA – Qualify to medal round; FB – Qualify to consolation round

Slopestyle

| Athlete | Event | Qualification | | | | Final | | | | |
| Athlete | Event | Run 1 | Run 2 | Best | Rank | Run 1 | Run 2 | Run 3 | Best | Rank |
|---|---|---|---|---|---|---|---|---|---|---|
| Taisei Yamamoto | Men's slopestyle | 56.00 | 70.40 | 70.40 | 20 | Did not advance | | | | |

== Ice hockey ==
Summary

Key:

- OT – Overtime
- GWS – Match decided by penalty-shootout

| Team | Event | Group Stage | | | | Quarterfinal | Semifinal / Pl. | Final / BM / Pl. | |
| Team | Event | Opposition Score | Opposition Score | Opposition Score | Rank | Opposition Score | Opposition Score | Opposition Score | Rank |
|---|---|---|---|---|---|---|---|---|---|
| Japan women's | Women's tournament | Sweden; L 1–2 | Switzerland; L 1–3 | Korea; W 4–1 | 3 | —N/a | Sweden; W 2–1 OT | Switzerland; L 0–1 | 6 |

=== Women's tournament ===
Japan women's national ice hockey team qualified by winning the final qualification tournament in Tomakomai, Japan.

Team roster

- Women's team event – 1 team of 23 players

Preliminary round

| Pos | Team | Pld | W | OTW | OTL | L | GF | GA | GD | Pts | Qualification |
|---|---|---|---|---|---|---|---|---|---|---|---|
| 1 | Switzerland | 3 | 3 | 0 | 0 | 0 | 13 | 2 | +11 | 9 | Quarterfinals |
| 2 | Sweden | 3 | 2 | 0 | 0 | 1 | 11 | 3 | +8 | 6 | Quarterfinals |
| 3 | Japan | 3 | 1 | 0 | 0 | 2 | 6 | 6 | 0 | 3 | Classification |
| 4 | Korea (H) | 3 | 0 | 0 | 0 | 3 | 1 | 20 | −19 | 0 | Classification |

Source: IIHF
(H) Host

| 10 February 2018; 16:40 | Japan | 1–2 (0–1, 1–0, 0–1) | Sweden | Kwandong Hockey Centre, Gangneung; Attendance: 3,762 |

Game reference

Nana Fujimoto
Goalies
Sara Grahn
Referees:
(United States) Katie Guay
(United States) Melissa Szkola
Linesmen:
(Slovenia) Nataša Pagon
(Czech Republic) Zuzana Svobodová

| | 0–1 | 02:21 – Rask (Küller, Carlsson) |
| Ukita (Kubo) – 36:52 | 1–1 |
| | 1–2 | 41:53 – Hjalmarsson (Grahm) |

2 min
Penalties
8 min
31
Shots
26

| 12 February 2018; 16:40 | Switzerland | 3–1 (0–0, 2–0, 1–1) | Japan | Kwandong Hockey Centre, Gangneung; Attendance: 4,033 |

Game reference

Florence Schelling
Goalies
Nana Fujimoto
Referees:
(Sweden) Gabriella Gran
(Norway) Aina Hove
Linesmen:
(Finland) Jenni Heikkinen
(Slovenia) Natasa Pagon

| S. Benz (Rüegg, L. Benz) (PP) – 30:19 | 1–0 |
| S. Benz (Meier) (PP) – 33:10 | 2–0 |
| Müller – 44:27 | 3–0 |
| | 3–1 | 47:33 – Kubo (Hori, H. Toko) |

10 min
Penalties
8 min
18
Shots
38

| 14 February 2018; 16:40 | Korea | 1–4 (0–2, 1–0, 0–2) | Japan | Kwandong Hockey Centre, Gangneung; Attendance: 4,110 |

Game reference

Shin So-jung
Goalies
Akane Konishi
Referees:
(Switzerland) Drahomira Fialova
(Germany) Nicole Hertrich
Linesmen:
(United States) Jessica Leclerc
(Czech Republic) Zuzana Svobodová

| | 0–1 | 01:07 – Kubo (H. Toko, Ukita) |
| | 0–2 | 03:58 – Ono (Koike, Yoneyama) (PP) |
| Griffin (Park Yo.) – 29:31 | 1–2 |
| | 1–3 | 51:42 – Koike (Hosoyamada, Yoneyama) (PP) |
| | 1–4 | 58:33 – Ukita (ENG) |

6 min
Penalties
4 min
13
Shots
44

5–8th place semifinal

| 18 February 2018; 16:40 | Sweden | 1–2 OT (0–0, 1–1, 0–0) (OT: 0–1) | Japan | Kwandong Hockey Centre, Gangneung; Attendance: 3,554 |

Game reference

Sara Grahn
Goalies
Nana Fujimoto
Referees:
(United States) Dina Allen
(Norway) Aina Hove
Linesmen:
(United States) Jessica Leclerc
(Canada) Justine Todd

| | 0–1 | 21:43 – Koike (Yoneyama, Ono) |
| Johansson (SH) – 26:25 | 1–1 |
| | 1–2 | 63:16 – A. Toko (Osawa) |

8 min
Penalties
8 min
29
Shots
37

Fifth place game

| 20 February 2018; 16:40 | Switzerland | 1–0 (1–0, 0–0, 0–0) | Japan | Kwandong Hockey Centre, Gangneung; Attendance: 3,958 |

Game reference
| Florence Schelling | Goalies | Nana Fujimoto | Referees: (Sweden) Gabriella Gran (Sweden) Katarina Timglas; Linesmen: (France) Charlotte Girard-Fabre (Sweden) Veronica Johansson |
| Raselli – 03:19 / 1–0 | | | Referees: (Sweden) Gabriella Gran (Sweden) Katarina Timglas; Linesmen: (France) Charlotte Girard-Fabre (Sweden) Veronica Johansson |
| 6 min | Penalties | 4 min | Referees: (Sweden) Gabriella Gran (Sweden) Katarina Timglas; Linesmen: (France) Charlotte Girard-Fabre (Sweden) Veronica Johansson |
| 14 | Shots | 20 | Referees: (Sweden) Gabriella Gran (Sweden) Katarina Timglas; Linesmen: (France) Charlotte Girard-Fabre (Sweden) Veronica Johansson |

== Nordic combined ==
| Athlete | Event | Ski jumping | | | Cross-country | | Total | |
| Athlete | Event | Distance | Points | Rank | Time | Rank | Time | Rank |
|---|---|---|---|---|---|---|---|---|
| Hideaki Nagai | Normal hill/10 km | 101.0 | 104.2 | 14 | 24:44.5 | 16 | 26:30.5 | 14 |
| Hideaki Nagai | Large hill/10 km | 134.0 | 121.0 | 13 | 24:08.2 | 22 | 25:20.2 | 12 |
| Akito Watabe | Normal hill/10 km | 105.5 | 123.7 | 3 | 24:28.2 | 2 | 24:56.2 | 2nd place, silver medalist(s) |
| Akito Watabe | Large hill/10 km | 134.0 | 138.9 | 1 | 24:05.0 | 20 | 24:05.0 | 5 |
| Yoshito Watabe | Normal hill/10 km | 104.0 | 114.3 | 8 | 25:11.2 | 29 | 26:16.2 | 12 |
| Yoshito Watabe | Large hill/10 km | 121.0 | 110.6 | 20 | 24:14.9 | 26 | 26:07.9 | 20 |
| Go Yamamoto | Normal hill/10 km | 97.5 | 104.0 | 15 | 26:11.1 | 42 | 27:57.1 | 33 |
| Go Yamamoto | Large hill/10 km | 127.5 | 124.5 | 8 | 24:34.2 | 32 | 25:32.2 | 16 |
| Hideaki Nagai; Akito Watabe; Yoshito Watabe; Takehiro Watanabe; Go Yamamoto | Team large hill/4×5 km | 525.0 | 455.3 | 3 | 47:59.6 | 7 | 48:18.6 | 4 |

== Short track speed skating ==
According to the ISU Special Olympic Qualification Rankings, Japan has qualified 5 men and 5 women.

On 13 February 2018, Japanese short-track speedskater Kei Saito, a reserve on the 5,000-meter relay team, has tested positive for a banned diuretic acetazolamide, and has been suspended from Winter Olympics for doping.

Men

| Athlete | Event | Heat | | Quarterfinal | | Semifinal | | Final | |
| Athlete | Event | Time | Rank | Time | Rank | Time | Rank | Time | Rank |
|---|---|---|---|---|---|---|---|---|---|
| Ryosuke Sakazume | 500 m | 40.658 | 2 Q | 40.563 | 2 Q | 40.434 | 4 FB | 40.985 | 8 |
| Ryosuke Sakazume | 1000 m | DNF | 3 ADV | 1:24.099 | 2 Q | 1:24.317 | 3 FB | 1:27.522 | 5 |
| Keita Watanabe | 500 m | 41.678 | 2 Q | 41.354 | 4 | Did not advance | | | |
| Keita Watanabe | 1000 m | 1:24.078 | 3 | Did not advance | | | | | |
| Keita Watanabe | 1500 m | 2:19.205 | 4 | —N/a | | Did not advance | | | |
| Hiroki Yokoyama | 1500 m | 2:13.323 | 4 | —N/a | | Did not advance | | | |
| Kazuki Yoshinaga | 1000 m | 1:24.030 | 2 Q | 1:24.649 | 4 | Did not advance | | | |
| Kazuki Yoshinaga | 1500 m | PEN | | —N/a | | Did not advance | | | |
| Ryosuke Sakazume; Keita Watanabe; Hiroki Yokoyama; Kazuki Yoshinaga | 5000 m relay | —N/a | | | | 6:42.655 | 4 FB | 7:02.554 | 7 |

Women

| Athlete | Event | Heat | | Quarterfinal | | Semifinal | | Final | |
| Athlete | Event | Time | Rank | Time | Rank | Time | Rank | Time | Rank |
|---|---|---|---|---|---|---|---|---|---|
| Shione Kaminaga | 1500 m | 2:28.719 | 6 | —N/a | | Did not advance | | | |
| Sumire Kikuchi | 500 m | 44.838 | 4 | Did not advance | | | | | |
| Sumire Kikuchi | 1000 m | 1:30.970 | 3 | Did not advance | | | | | |
| Sumire Kikuchi | 1500 m | 2:29.665 | 3 Q | —N/a | | 2:34.526 | 3 FB | 2:54.450 | 11 |
| Yuki Kikuchi | 1500 m | PEN | | —N/a | | Did not advance | | | |
| Hitomi Saito | 1000 m | 1:32.457 | 2 Q | 1:30.804 | 4 | Did not advance | | | |
| Ayuko Ito; Shione Kaminaga; Sumire Kikuchi; Yuki Kikuchi; Hitomi Saito | 3000 m relay | —N/a | | | | 4:12.664 | 4 FB | 4:13.072 | 6 |

Qualification legend: ADV – Advanced due to being impeded by another skater; FA – Qualify to medal round; FB – Qualify to consolation round; OR – Olympic record

== Skeleton ==
Based on the world rankings, Japan qualified 3 sleds.

| Athlete | Event | Run 1 | | Run 2 | | Run 3 | | Run 4 | | Total | |
| Athlete | Event | Time | Rank | Time | Rank | Time | Rank | Time | Rank | Time | Rank |
|---|---|---|---|---|---|---|---|---|---|---|---|
| Katsuyuki Miyajima | Men's | 51.63 | 20 | 52.15 | 27 | 51.80 | 24 | Eliminated | | 2:35.58 | 26 |
| Hiroatsu Takahashi | Men's | 52.00 | 27 | 51.50 | 21 | 51.19 | 16 | Eliminated | | 2:34.69 | 22 |
| Takako Oguchi | Women's | 53.82 | 19 | 53.41 | 18 | 53.62 | 19 | 53.11 | 18 | 3:33.96 | 19 |

== Ski jumping ==
Men

| Athlete | Event | Qualification | | | First round | | | Final | | | Total | |
| Athlete | Event | Distance | Points | Rank | Distance | Points | Rank | Distance | Points | Rank | Points | Rank |
|---|---|---|---|---|---|---|---|---|---|---|---|---|
| Daiki Ito | Normal hill | 93.5 | 106.0 | 31 Q | 103.0 | 110.3 | 19 Q | 102.0 | 104.4 | 20 | 214.7 | 20 |
| Noriaki Kasai | Normal hill | 98.0 | 117.7 | 20 Q | 104.5 | 113.9 | 16 Q | 99.0 | 99.4 | 26 | 213.3 | 21 |
| Noriaki Kasai | Large hill | 122.5 | 104.2 | 22 Q | 121.0 | 107.9 | 33 | Did not advance | | | | |
| Junshirō Kobayashi | Normal hill | 101.0 | 118.4 | 18 Q | 93.0 | 98.0 | 31 | Did not advance | | | | |
| Junshirō Kobayashi | Large hill | 115.0 | 89.5 | 37 Q | 122.0 | 114.8 | 26 | 122.0 | 110.0 | 24 | 224.8 | 24 |
| Ryoyu Kobayashi | Normal hill | 98.0 | 115.3 | 21 Q | 108.0 | 120.2 | 9 Q | 108.0 | 120.6 | 7 | 240.8 | 7 |
| Ryoyu Kobayashi | Large hill | 143.5 | 127.6 | 3 Q | 135.5 | 134.0 | 7 Q | 128.0 | 124.0 | 15 | 258.0 | 12 |
| Taku Takeuchi | Large hill | 120.5 | 98.5 | 27 Q | 124.0 | 114.1 | 27 Q | 125.5 | 120.1 | 19 | 234.2 | 22 |
| Daiki Ito; Noriaki Kasai; Ryoyu Kobayashi; Taku Takeuchi | Team large hill | —N/a | | | 506.5 | 475.5 | 6 Q | 501.0 | 465.0 | 6 | 940.5 | 6 |

Women

| Athlete | Event | First round | | | Final | | | Total | |
| Athlete | Event | Distance | Points | Rank | Distance | Points | Rank | Points | Rank |
|---|---|---|---|---|---|---|---|---|---|
| Yuki Ito | Normal hill | 94.0 | 105.1 | 9 | 93.0 | 98.8 | 10 | 203.9 | 9 |
| Kaori Iwabuchi | Normal hill | 93.5 | 98.2 | 11 | 89.0 | 90.1 | 13 | 188.3 | 12 |
| Yuka Seto | Normal hill | 93.0 | 90.3 | 15 | 89.0 | 81.7 | 24 | 172.0 | 17 |
| Sara Takanashi | Normal hill | 103.5 | 120.3 | 3 | 103.5 | 123.5 | 3 | 243.8 | 3rd place, bronze medalist(s) |

== Snowboarding ==
Freestyle
Men

| Athlete | Event | Qualification | | | | Final | | | | |
| Athlete | Event | Run 1 | Run 2 | Best | Rank | Run 1 | Run 2 | Run 3 | Best | Rank |
|---|---|---|---|---|---|---|---|---|---|---|
| Hiroaki Kunitake | Big air | 37.25 | 36.75 | 37.25 | 17 | Did not advance | | | | |
| Hiroaki Kunitake | Slopestyle | 39.45 | 43.16 | 43.16 | 14 | Did not advance | | | | |
| Yuri Okubo | Big air | 84.25 | 44.25 | 84.25 | 9 | Did not advance | | | | |
| Yuri Okubo | Slopestyle | 24.45 | 75.05 | 75.05 | 8 | Did not advance | | | | |
| Ayumu Hirano | Halfpipe | 87.50 | 95.25 | 95.25 | 3 Q | 35.25 | 95.25 | 43.25 | 95.25 | 2nd place, silver medalist(s) |
| Taku Hiraoka | Halfpipe | 26.00 | 75.75 | 75.75 | 13 | Did not advance | | | | |
| Raibu Katayama | Halfpipe | 85.50 | 90.75 | 90.75 | 5 Q | 85.75 | 25.00 | 87.00 | 87.00 | 7 |
| Yuto Totsuka | Halfpipe | 80.00 | 65.25 | 80.00 | 10 Q | 39.25 | 7.00 | DNS | 39.25 | 11 |

Women

| Athlete | Event | Qualification | | | | Final | | | | |
| Athlete | Event | Run 1 | Run 2 | Best | Rank | Run 1 | Run 2 | Run 3 | Best | Rank |
|---|---|---|---|---|---|---|---|---|---|---|
| Yuka Fujimori | Big air | 82.00 | 94.25 | 94.25 | 2 Q | 82.25 | 40.50 | JNS | 122.75 | 7 |
| Yuka Fujimori | Slopestyle | Canceled | | | | 63.73 | 48.51 | CAN | 63.73 | 9 |
| Asami Hirono | Big air | 27.50 | 37.75 | 37.75 | 24 | Did not advance | | | | |
| Asami Hirono | Slopestyle | Canceled | | | | 49.80 | 27.26 | CAN | 49.80 | 12 |
| Reira Iwabuchi | Big air | 80.00 | 92.75 | 92.75 | 3 Q | 79.75 | 67.75 | JNS | 147.50 | 4 |
| Reira Iwabuchi | Slopestyle | Canceled | | | | 48.33 | 31.06 | CAN | 48.33 | 14 |
| Miyabi Onitsuka | Big air | 81.75 | 86.50 | 86.50 | 7 Q | 78.75 | JNS | 40.25 | 119.00 | 8 |
| Miyabi Onitsuka | Slopestyle | Canceled | | | | 33.25 | 39.55 | CAN | 39.55 | 19 |
| Kurumi Imai | Halfpipe | 54.75 | 50.00 | 54.75 | 15 | Did not advance | | | | |
| Haruna Matsumoto | Halfpipe | 80.75 | 84.25 | 84.25 | 3 Q | 70.00 | 46.25 | 65.75 | 70.00 | 6 |
| Hikaru Oe | Halfpipe | 10.00 | 51.00 | 51.00 | 17 | Did not advance | | | | |
| Sena Tomita | Halfpipe | 59.50 | 66.75 | 66.75 | 7 Q | 65.25 | 34.50 | 60.50 | 65.25 | 8 |

Parallel

| Athlete | Event | Qualification | | Round of 16 | Quarterfinal | Semifinal | Final | |
| Athlete | Event | Time | Rank | Opposition Time | Opposition Time | Opposition Time | Opposition Time | Rank |
|---|---|---|---|---|---|---|---|---|
| Masaki Shiba | Men's giant slalom | 1:26.91 | 27 | Did not advance | | | | |
| Tomoka Takeuchi | Women's giant slalom | 1:32.86 | 6 Q | Dujmovits (AUT); W –0.17 | Jörg (GER); L +0.62 | Did not advance | | |

== Speed skating ==
Men

| Athlete | Event | Race | |
| Athlete | Event | Time | Rank |
|---|---|---|---|
| Tsubasa Hasegawa | 500 m | 35.08 | 14 |
| Tsubasa Hasegawa | 1000 m | 1:09.83 | 20 |
| Seitaro Ichinohe | 5000 m | 6:16.55 | 9 |
| Joji Kato | 500 m | 34.831 | 6 |
| Shota Nakamura | 1500 m | 1:47.38 | 24 |
| Takuro Oda | 1000 m | 1:08.568 | 5 |
| Takuro Oda | 1500 m | 1:45.44 | 5 |
| Ryousuke Tsuchiya | 5000 m | 6:22.45 | 16 |
| Ryousuke Tsuchiya | 10000 m | 13:10.31 | 10 |
| Shane Williamson | 1500 m | 1:46.21 | 10 |
| Daichi Yamanaka | 500 m | 34.78 | 5 |
| Daichi Yamanaka | 1000 m | 1:10.027 | 24 |

Women

| Athlete | Event | Race | |
| Athlete | Event | Time | Rank |
|---|---|---|---|
| Arisa Go | 500 m | 37.67 | 8 |
| Arisa Go | 1000 m | 1:15.84 | 13 |
| Erina Kamiya | 500 m | 38.255 | 13 |
| Ayaka Kikuchi | 1500 m | 1:58.92 | 16 |
| Ayaka Kikuchi | 3000 m | 4:13.25 | 19 |
| Nao Kodaira | 500 m | 36.94 OR | 1st place, gold medalist(s) |
| Nao Kodaira | 1000 m | 1:13:82 | 2nd place, silver medalist(s) |
| Nao Kodaira | 1500 m | 1:56.11 | 6 |
| Misaki Oshigiri | 5000 m | 7:07.71 | 9 |
| Ayano Sato | 3000 m | 4:04.35 | 8 |
| Miho Takagi | 1000 m | 1:13:98 | 3rd place, bronze medalist(s) |
| Miho Takagi | 1500 m | 1:54.55 | 2nd place, silver medalist(s) |
| Miho Takagi | 3000 m | 4:01.35 | 5 |
| Nana Takagi | 5000 m | 7:17.45 | 12 |

Mass start

| Athlete | Event | Semifinal | | | Final | | |
| Athlete | Event | Points | Time | Rank | Points | Time | Rank |
|---|---|---|---|---|---|---|---|
| Ryousuke Tsuchiya | Men's mass start | 0 | 7:55.77 | 11 | Did not advance | | |
| Shane Williamson | Men's mass start | 20 | 8:25.44 | 3 Q | 0 | 7:46.19 | 11 |
| Ayano Sato | Women's mass start | 0 | 4:49.19 | 12 | Did not advance | | |
| Nana Takagi | Women's mass start | 5 | 8:55.14 | 5 Q | 60 | 8:32.87 | 1st place, gold medalist(s) |

Team pursuit

| Athlete | Event | Quarterfinal | | Semifinal | | Final | |
| Athlete | Event | Opposition Time | Rank | Opposition Time | Rank | Opposition Time | Rank |
|---|---|---|---|---|---|---|---|
| Seitaro Ichinohe; Shota Nakamura; Ryosuke Tsuchiya; Shane Williamson | Men's team pursuit | Canada; W 3:41.62 | 5 FC | Did not advance | | Final C Italy; W 3:41.62 | 5 |
| Miho Takagi; Ayaka Kikuchi; Ayano Sato; Nana Takagi | Women's team pursuit | China; W 2:56.09 | 2 Q | Canada; W 2:58.94 | 1 FA | Netherlands; W 2:53.89 OR | 1st place, gold medalist(s) |

== See also ==
- Japan at the 2017 Asian Winter Games
