= South Korea at the 2018 Winter Olympics =

- Flag of South Korea
- IOC code: KOR
- NOC: Korean Olympic Committee
- Website: www.sports.or.kr (in Korean)

in Pyeongchang, South Korea February 9–25, 2018
- Competitors: 122^{[a]} in 15 sports
- Flag bearers: None (opening)^{[b]} and Lee Seung-hoon (closing)
- Medals Ranked 7th: Gold 5 Silver 8 Bronze 4 Total 17

Winter Olympics appearances (overview)
- 1948; 1952; 1956; 1960; 1964; 1968; 1972; 1976; 1980; 1984; 1988; 1992; 1994; 1998; 2002; 2006; 2010; 2014; 2018; 2022; 2026

Other related appearances
- Korea (2018)

South Korea competed at the 2018 Winter Olympics in Pyeongchang, from 9 to 25 February 2018, as the host nation. It was represented by 122 competitors^{[a]} in all 15 disciplines (15 sports).

In January 2018, following inter-governmental talks, the teams representing South Korea and North Korea entered the Opening Ceremony marching under the Korean Unification Flag, while in women's ice hockey there was a single united Korean team.

South Korea won a total of seventeen medals – five gold, eight silver and four bronze – making these Games the most successful in South Korea's history in terms of total medals won, and earning the country 6th place in the overall medal table. Thirteen of the medals were won in long-track and short-track speed skating events. For the first time in their history, South Korean athletes also won medals in sliding sports (bobsleigh and skeleton), in a team event (curling) and in a snow event (snowboarding).

== Medalists ==
The following South Korean competitors won medals at the Games. In the by discipline sections below, medalists' names are bolded.

Medal	Name	Sport	Event	Date
Gold	Lim Hyo-jun	Short track speed skating	Men's 1500 metres	10 February
Gold	Yun Sung-bin	Skeleton	Men's	16 February
Gold	Choi Min-jeong	Short track speed skating	Women's 1500 metres	17 February
Gold	Choi Min-jeong; Kim A-lang; Kim Ye-jin; Lee Yu-bin; Shim Suk-hee	Short track speed skating	Women's 3000 metre relay	20 February
Gold	Lee Seung-hoon	Speed skating	Men's mass start	24 February
Silver	Lee Sang-hwa	Speed skating	Women's 500 metres	18 February
Silver	Cha Min-kyu	Speed skating	Men's 500 metres	19 February
Silver	Lee Seung-hoon; Chung Jae-won; Kim Min-seok	Speed skating	Men's team pursuit	21 February
Silver	Hwang Dae-heon	Short track speed skating	Men's 500 metres	22 February
Silver	Lee Sang-ho	Snowboarding	Men's parallel giant slalom	24 February
Silver	Kim Bo-reum	Speed skating	Women's mass start	24 February
Silver	Kim Eun-jung; Kim Kyeong-ae; Kim Seon-yeong; Kim Yeong-mi; Kim Cho-hi	Curling	Women's tournament	25 February
Silver	Jun Jung-lin; Kim Dong-hyun; Seo Young-woo; Won Yun-jong	Bobsleigh	Four-man	25 February
Bronze	Kim Min-seok	Speed skating	Men's 1500 metres	13 February
Bronze	Seo Yi-ra	Short track speed skating	Men's 1000 metres	17 February
Bronze	Lim Hyo-jun	Short track speed skating	Men's 500 metres	22 February
Bronze	Kim Tae-yun	Speed skating	Men's 1000 metres	23 February

Medals by sport
Sport	1st place, gold medalist(s)	2nd place, silver medalist(s)	3rd place, bronze medalist(s)	Total
Short track speed skating	3	1	2	**6**
Speed skating	1	4	2	**7**
Skeleton	1	0	0	**1**
Bobsleigh	0	1	0	**1**
Curling	0	1	0	**1**
Snowboarding	0	1	0	**1**
Total	5	8	4	17

Medals by date
Day	Date	1st place, gold medalist(s)	2nd place, silver medalist(s)	3rd place, bronze medalist(s)	Total
Day 1	10 February	1	0	0	**1**
Day 2	11 February	0	0	0	**0**
Day 3	12 February	0	0	0	**0**
Day 4	13 February	0	0	1	**1**
Day 5	14 February	0	0	0	**0**
Day 6	15 February	0	0	0	**0**
Day 7	16 February	1	0	0	**1**
Day 8	17 February	1	0	1	**2**
Day 9	18 February	0	1	0	**1**
Day 10	19 February	0	1	0	**1**
Day 11	20 February	1	0	0	**1**
Day 12	21 February	0	1	0	**1**
Day 13	22 February	0	1	1	**2**
Day 14	23 February	0	0	1	**1**
Day 15	24 February	1	2	0	**3**
Day 16	25 February	0	2	0	**2**
Total		5	8	4	17

Medals by gender
**Gender**	1st place, gold medalist(s)	2nd place, silver medalist(s)	3rd place, bronze medalist(s)	**Total**
Male	3	5	4	**12**
Female	2	3	0	**5**
Total	5	8	4	17

== Records ==
Sport	Event	Date	Round	Athlete	Time	Record	Ref
Short track speed skating	Men's 1500 metres	10 February	Final A	Lim Hyo-jun	2:10.485	OR	
Short track speed skating	Men's 5000 metre relay	13 February	Semifinal 2	Hwang Dae-heon; Kim Do-kyoum; Kwak Yoon-gy; Lim Hyo-jun	6:34.510	OR	
Short track speed skating	Women's 500 metres	10 February	Heat 8	Choi Min-jeong	42.870	OR	
Short track speed skating	Women's 500 metres	13 February	Semifinal 1	Choi Min-jeong	42.422	OR	

== Competitors ==
The following is the list of number of competitors participating at the Games per sport/discipline.

Sport	Men	Women	Total
Alpine skiing	2	2	4
Biathlon	1	5	6
Bobsleigh	4	2	6
Cross-country skiing	2	2	4
Curling	6	6	12
Figure skating	3	4	7
Freestyle skiing	4	5	9
Ice hockey	25	0^{$}	48
Luge	3	2	5
Nordic combined	1	0	1
Short track speed skating	5	5	10
Skeleton	2	1	3
Ski jumping	4	1	5
Snowboarding	7	3	10
Speed skating	9	7	16
Total	78	45	123

^{$} Additionally, 23 athletes of the women's ice hockey team formed part of a unified Korea women's team which competed under a different country code (COR).

== Alpine skiing ==
South Korea qualified a total of two male and two female athletes for alpine skiing.

Athlete	Event	Run 1		Run 2		Total	
Athlete	Event	Time	Rank	Time	Rank	Time	Rank
Jung Dong-hyun	Men's giant slalom	DNF					
Jung Dong-hyun	Men's slalom	51.79	31	53.28	28	1:45.07	27
Kim Dong-woo	Men's downhill	—N/a				1:47.99	48
Kim Dong-woo	Men's super-G	—N/a				1:31.64	44
Kim Dong-woo	Men's combined	1:24.02	56	53.02	31	2:17.04	33
Kim Dong-woo	Men's giant slalom	1:14.49	43	1:15.56	41	2:30.05	39
Kim Dong-woo	Men's slalom	DNF					
Gim So-hui	Women's giant slalom	1:19.13	48	1:16.24	45	2:35.37	45
Gim So-hui	Women's slalom	DNF					
Kang Young-seo	Women's giant slalom	1:19.67	50	1:17.39	48	2:37.06	47
Kang Young-seo	Women's slalom	DNF					

Mixed

Athlete	Event	Round of 16	Quarterfinals	Semifinals	Final / BM	
Athlete	Event	Opposition Result	Opposition Result	Opposition Result	Opposition Result	Rank
Jung Dong-hyun; Kim Dong-woo; Gim So-hui; Kang Young-seo	Team	Austria; L 0–4	did not advance			

== Biathlon ==
Based on their Nations Cup ranking in the 2016–17 Biathlon World Cup, South Korea qualified five women and received one men spot.

Athlete	Event	Time	Misses	Rank
Timofey Lapshin	Men's sprint	24:22.6	1 (0+1)	16
Timofey Lapshin	Men's pursuit	35:50.7	4 (1+0+2+1)	22
Timofey Lapshin	Men's individual	50:28.6	1 (0+1+0+0)	20
Timofey Lapshin	Men's mass start	38:07.4	1 (0+1+0+0)	25
Ekaterina Avvakumova	Women's sprint	26:24.9	6 (3+3)	87
Ekaterina Avvakumova	Women's individual	44:25.3	1 (0+0+1+0)	16
Anna Frolina	Women's sprint	22:56.9	3 (2+1)	32
Anna Frolina	Women's pursuit	36:14.2	8 (1+2+2+3)	50
Anna Frolina	Women's individual	47:50.4	5 (1+0+1+3)	61
Jung Ju-mi	Women's individual	53:32.8	6 (2+2+0+2)	86
Ko Eun-jung	Women's sprint	25:12.1	2 (1+1)	78
Mun Ji-hee	Women's sprint	25:26.6	6 (2+4)	82
Mun Ji-hee	Women's individual	50:21.5	7 (0+3+2+2)	78
Ekaterina Avvakumova; Anna Frolina; Ko Eun-jung; Mun Ji-hee	Women's team relay	1:20:20.6	22 (5+17)	18

== Bobsleigh ==
Based on their rankings in the 2017–18 Bobsleigh World Cup, South Korea qualified three sleds.

Athlete	Event	Run 1		Run 2		Run 3		Run 4		Total	
Athlete	Event	Time	Rank	Time	Rank	Time	Rank	Time	Rank	Time	Rank
Won Yun-jong*; Seo Young-woo	Two-man	49.50	11	49.39	4	49.15	5	49.36	5	3:17.40	6
Jun Jung-lin; Kim Dong-hyun; Seo Young-woo; Won Yun-jong*	Four-man	48.65	2	49.19	4	48.89	3	49.65	10	3:16.38	2nd place, silver medalist(s)
Kim Min-seong; Kim Yoo-ran*	Two-woman	51.24	=15	51.20	12	51.32	13	51.55	17	3:25.31	15

* Denotes the driver of each sled

== Cross-country skiing ==
South Korea qualified a total of two male and two female athletes for cross-country skiing.

Distance

Athlete	Event	Classical		Freestyle		Total		
Athlete	Event	Time	Rank	Time	Rank	Time	Deficit	Rank
Kim Eun-ho	Men's 15 km freestyle	—N/a				39:07.9	+5:24.0	85
Kim Eun-ho	Men's 30 km skiathlon	48:29.9	66	LAP				
Kim Eun-ho	Men's 50 km classical	—N/a				LAP		
Kim Magnus	Men's 15 km freestyle	—N/a				36:39.0	+2:55.1	45
Kim Magnus	Men's 50 km classical	—N/a				2:24:14.0	+15:51.9	47
Ju Hye-ri	Women's 10 km freestyle	—N/a				31:27.1	+6:26.6	79
Lee Chae-won	Women's 10 km freestyle	—N/a				28:37.5	+3:37.0	51
Lee Chae-won	Women's 15 km skiathlon	25:05.5	59	21:06.8	42	46:44.5	+5:59.6	57

Sprint

Athlete	Event	Qualification		Quarterfinal		Semifinal		Final	
Athlete	Event	Time	Rank	Time	Rank	Time	Rank	Time	Rank
Kim Magnus	Men's sprint	3:22.36	49	did not advance					
Kim Eun-ho; Kim Magnus	Men's team sprint	—N/a				17:56.71	13	did not advance	
Ju Hye-ri	Women's sprint	4:11.92	67	did not advance					
Ju Hye-ri; Lee Chae-won	Women's team sprint	—N/a				19:19.17	11	did not advance	

== Curling ==
South Korea qualified their men's team (five athletes), their women's team (five athletes), and their mixed doubles team (two athletes).

Summary

Team	Event	Group Stage										Tiebreaker	Semifinal	Final / BM	
Team	Event	Opposition Score	Opposition Score	Opposition Score	Opposition Score	Opposition Score	Opposition Score	Opposition Score	Opposition Score	Opposition Score	Rank	Opposition Score	Opposition Score	Opposition Score	Rank
Kim Chang-min; Seong Se-hyeon; Oh Eun-su; Lee Ki-bok; Kim Min-chan	Men's tournament	(United States) USA; L 7–11	(Sweden) SWE; L 2–7	(Norway) NOR; L 5–7	(Canada) CAN; L 6–7	(United Kingdom) GBR; W 11–5	(Denmark) DEN; L 8–9	(Italy) ITA; W 8–6	(Switzerland) SUI; W 8–7	(Japan) JPN; W 10–4	7	did not advance			
Kim Eun-jung; Kim Kyeong-ae; Kim Seon-yeong; Kim Yeong-mi; Kim Cho-hi	Women's tournament	(Canada) CAN; W 8–6	(Japan) JPN; L 5–7	(Switzerland) SUI; W 7–5	(United Kingdom) GBR; W 7–4	(China) CHN; W 12–5	(Sweden) SWE; W 7–6	(United States) USA; W 9–6	(International Olympic Committee) OAR; W 11–2	(Denmark) DEN; W 9–3	1 Q	BYE	(Japan) JPN; W 8–7	(Sweden) SWE; L 3–8	2nd place, silver medalist(s)
Jang Hye-ji; Lee Ki-jeong	Mixed doubles	(Finland) FIN; W 9-4	(China) CHN; L 7-8	(Norway) NOR; L 3-8	(United States) USA; W 9-1	(International Olympic Committee) OAR; L 5-6	(Switzerland) SUI; L 4-6	(Canada) CAN; L 3-7	—N/a		5	did not advance			

=== Men's tournament ===
South Korea qualified a men's team as the host country.

Final round robin standings
Team	Skip	Pld	W	L	PF	PA	EW	EL	BE	SE	S%	Qualification
Sweden	Niklas Edin	9	7	2	62	43	34	28	13	8	87%	Playoffs
Canada	Kevin Koe	9	6	3	56	46	36	34	14	8	87%	Playoffs
United States	John Shuster	9	5	4	67	63	37	39	4	6	80%	Playoffs
Great Britain	Kyle Smith	9	5	4	55	60	40	37	8	7	82%	Tiebreaker
Switzerland	Peter de Cruz	9	5	4	60	55	39	37	10	6	83%	Tiebreaker
Norway	Thomas Ulsrud	9	4	5	52	56	34	39	7	8	82%	
South Korea	Kim Chang-min	9	4	5	65	63	39	39	8	8	82%	
Japan	Yusuke Morozumi	9	4	5	48	56	33	35	13	5	81%	
Italy	Joël Retornaz	9	3	6	50	56	37	38	15	7	81%	
Denmark	Rasmus Stjerne	9	2	7	53	70	36	39	12	5	83%	

Round-robin

South Korea had a bye in draws 3, 7 and 11.

Draw 1

Wednesday, 14 February, 09:05

Sheet C	1	2	3	4	5	6	7	8	9	10	Final
South Korea (Kim)	0	2	0	1	0	3	0	1	0	X	7
United States (Shuster) 🔨	2	0	3	0	3	0	2	0	1	X	11

Draw 2

Wednesday, 14 February, 20:05

Sheet B	1	2	3	4	5	6	7	8	9	10	Final
South Korea (Kim)	0	0	0	1	0	0	1	0	0	X	2
Sweden (Edin) 🔨	0	2	0	0	2	1	0	1	1	X	7

Draw 4

Friday, 16 February, 09:05

Sheet C	1	2	3	4	5	6	7	8	9	10	Final
Norway (Ulsrud) 🔨	0	2	0	0	2	0	0	2	0	1	7
South Korea (Kim)	1	0	0	1	0	1	0	0	2	0	5

Draw 5

Friday, 16 February, 20:05

Sheet D	1	2	3	4	5	6	7	8	9	10	Final
Canada (Koe)	0	0	3	0	1	0	2	1	0	0	7
South Korea (Kim) 🔨	0	1	0	1	0	1	0	0	2	1	6

Draw 6

Saturday, 17 February, 14:05

Sheet A	1	2	3	4	5	6	7	8	9	10	Final
South Korea (Kim) 🔨	0	2	1	0	2	2	0	3	1	X	11
Great Britain (Smith)	2	0	0	1	0	0	2	0	0	X	5

Draw 8

Sunday, 18 February, 20:05

Sheet B	1	2	3	4	5	6	7	8	9	10	11	Final
Denmark (Stjerne) 🔨	0	0	2	1	2	0	0	3	0	0	1	9
South Korea (Kim)	2	0	0	0	0	2	1	0	1	2	0	8

Draw 9

Monday, 19 February, 14:05

Sheet A	1	2	3	4	5	6	7	8	9	10	Final
Italy (Retornaz)	0	1	0	2	0	1	0	1	1	0	6
South Korea (Kim) 🔨	3	0	1	0	1	0	2	0	0	1	8

Draw 10

Tuesday, 20 February, 09:05

Sheet C	1	2	3	4	5	6	7	8	9	10	Final
South Korea (Kim)	0	0	4	0	0	1	0	2	0	1	8
Switzerland (de Cruz) 🔨	1	0	0	1	3	0	1	0	1	0	7

Draw 12

Wednesday, 21 February, 14:05

Sheet D	1	2	3	4	5	6	7	8	9	10	Final
South Korea (Kim) 🔨	1	0	2	0	0	4	0	3	X	X	10
Japan (Morozumi)	0	1	0	2	0	0	1	0	X	X	4

=== Women's tournament ===
South Korea qualified a women's team as the host country.

Final round robin standings
Team	Skip	Pld	W	L	PF	PA	EW	EL	BE	SE	S%	Qualification
South Korea	Kim Eun-jung	9	8	1	75	44	41	34	5	15	79%	Playoffs
Sweden	Anna Hasselborg	9	7	2	64	48	42	34	14	13	83%	Playoffs
Great Britain	Eve Muirhead	9	6	3	61	56	39	38	12	6	79%	Playoffs
Japan	Satsuki Fujisawa	9	5	4	59	55	38	36	10	13	75%	Playoffs
China	Wang Bingyu	9	4	5	57	65	35	38	12	5	78%	
Canada	Rachel Homan	9	4	5	68	59	40	36	10	12	81%	
Switzerland	Silvana Tirinzoni	9	4	5	60	55	34	37	12	7	78%	
United States	Nina Roth	9	4	5	56	65	38	39	7	6	78%	
Olympic Athletes from Russia	Victoria Moiseeva	9	2	7	45	76	34	40	8	6	76%	
Denmark	Madeleine Dupont	9	1	8	50	72	32	41	10	6	73%	

Round-robin

South Korea had a bye in draws 1, 5 and 9.

Draw 2

Thursday, 15 February, 09:05

Sheet A	1	2	3	4	5	6	7	8	9	10	Final
Canada (Homan)	0	1	0	0	0	2	1	0	0	2	6
South Korea (Kim) 🔨	1	0	0	1	2	0	0	1	3	0	8

Draw 3

Thursday, 15 February, 20:05

Sheet D	1	2	3	4	5	6	7	8	9	10	Final
South Korea (Kim) 🔨	0	2	0	1	0	1	1	0	0	0	5
Japan (Fujisawa)	1	0	1	0	1	0	0	1	2	1	7

Draw 4

Friday, 16 February, 14:05

Sheet B	1	2	3	4	5	6	7	8	9	10	Final
South Korea (Kim)	1	0	1	1	1	0	1	0	2	0	7
Switzerland (Tirinzoni) 🔨	0	2	0	0	0	1	0	1	0	1	5

Draw 6

Saturday, 17 February, 20:05

Sheet C	1	2	3	4	5	6	7	8	9	10	Final
South Korea (Kim)	0	0	0	1	1	0	0	2	2	1	7
Great Britain (Muirhead) 🔨	0	0	1	0	0	1	2	0	0	0	4

Draw 7

Sunday, 18 February, 14:05

Sheet D	1	2	3	4	5	6	7	8	9	10	Final
China (Wang)	0	1	0	1	0	2	1	0	X	X	5
South Korea (Kim) 🔨	3	0	3	0	4	0	0	2	X	X	12

Draw 8

Monday, 19 February, 09:05

Sheet C	1	2	3	4	5	6	7	8	9	10	Final
Sweden (Hasselborg)	1	0	0	0	1	0	1	0	2	1	6
South Korea (Kim) 🔨	0	1	0	2	0	2	0	2	0	0	7

Draw 10

Tuesday, 20 February, 14:05

Sheet B	1	2	3	4	5	6	7	8	9	10	Final
United States (Roth) 🔨	2	0	1	0	0	1	0	2	0	X	6
South Korea (Kim)	0	1	0	1	4	0	1	0	2	X	9

Draw 11

Wednesday, 21 February, 09:05

Sheet A	1	2	3	4	5	6	7	8	9	10	Final
South Korea (Kim)	3	3	3	0	2	0	X	X	X	X	11
Olympic Athletes from Russia (Moiseeva) 🔨	0	0	0	1	0	1	X	X	X	X	2

Draw 12

Wednesday, 21 February, 20:05

Sheet D	1	2	3	4	5	6	7	8	9	10	Final
South Korea (Kim) 🔨	0	1	0	3	2	0	3	X	X	X	9
Denmark (Dupont)	0	0	2	0	0	1	0	X	X	X	3

Semifinal

Friday, 23 February, 20:05

Sheet A	1	2	3	4	5	6	7	8	9	10	11	Final
South Korea (Kim) 🔨	3	0	1	0	2	0	0	1	0	0	1	8
Japan (Fujisawa)	0	2	0	1	0	1	0	0	2	1	0	7

Gold Medal Game

Sunday, 25 February, 09:05

Sheet B	1	2	3	4	5	6	7	8	9	10	Final
South Korea (Kim) 🔨	1	0	0	0	0	1	0	1	0	X	3
Sweden (Hasselborg)	0	0	2	1	1	0	3	0	1	X	8

=== Mixed doubles ===
South Korea qualified a mixed doubles team as the host country.

Final round robin standings
Team	Athletes	Pld	W	L	PF	PA	EW	EL	BE	SE	S%	Qualification
Canada	Kaitlyn Lawes / John Morris	7	6	1	52	26	28	20	0	9	80%	Playoffs
Switzerland	Jenny Perret / Martin Rios	7	5	2	45	40	29	26	0	10	71%	Playoffs
Olympic Athletes from Russia	Anastasia Bryzgalova / Alexander Krushelnitskiy	7	4	3	36	44	26	27	1	7	67%	Playoffs
Norway	Kristin Skaslien / Magnus Nedregotten	7	4	3	39	43	26	25	1	8	74%	Tiebreaker
China	Wang Rui / Ba Dexin	7	4	3	47	42	27	27	1	6	72%	Tiebreaker
South Korea	Jang Hye-ji / Lee Ki-jeong	7	2	5	40	40	23	29	1	7	67%	
United States	Rebecca Hamilton / Matt Hamilton	7	2	5	37	43	26	25	0	9	74%	
Finland	Oona Kauste / Tomi Rantamäki	7	1	6	35	53	23	29	0	6	67%	

Draw 1

Thursday, February 8, 9:05

Sheet C	1	2	3	4	5	6	7	8	Final
South Korea (Jang / Lee)	3	1	1	0	0	0	4	X	9
Finland (Kauste / Rantamäki) 🔨	0	0	0	1	2	1	0	X	4

Draw 2

Thursday, February 8, 20:04

Sheet B	1	2	3	4	5	6	7	8	9	Final
South Korea (Jang / Lee)	0	1	0	0	4	0	2	0	0	7
China (Wang / Ba) 🔨	2	0	3	1	0	1	0	0	1	8

Draw 3

Friday, February 9, 8:35

Sheet A	1	2	3	4	5	6	7	8	Final
South Korea (Jang / Lee)	0	0	0	1	0	2	0	X	3
Norway (Skaslien / Nedregotten) 🔨	1	3	1	0	1	0	2	X	8

Draw 4

Friday, February 9, 13:35

Sheet C	1	2	3	4	5	6	7	8	Final
United States (R. Hamilton / M. Hamilton)	0	1	0	0	0	0	X	X	1
South Korea (Jang / Lee) 🔨	2	0	2	3	1	1	X	X	9

Draw 5

Saturday, February 10, 9:05

Sheet D	1	2	3	4	5	6	7	8	9	Final
South Korea (Jang / Lee)	1	0	1	0	0	1	0	2	0	5
Olympic Athletes from Russia (Bryzgalova / Krushelnitskiy) 🔨	0	1	0	2	1	0	1	0	1	6

Draw 6

Saturday, February 10, 20:04

Sheet B	1	2	3	4	5	6	7	8	Final
Switzerland (Perret / Rios) 🔨	2	1	0	1	1	0	1	0	6
South Korea (Jang / Lee)	0	0	1	0	0	1	0	2	4

Draw 7

Sunday, February 11, 9:05

Sheet D	1	2	3	4	5	6	7	8	Final
Canada (Lawes / Morris)	1	1	0	2	1	0	2	X	7
South Korea (Jang / Lee) 🔨	0	0	2	0	0	1	0	X	3

== Figure skating ==
South Korea qualified two female figure skaters, based on its placement at the 2017 World Figure Skating Championships in Helsinki, Finland. They additionally qualified one male figure skater as well as an entry in ice dancing through the 2017 CS Nebelhorn Trophy. As hosts, they were given a quota to compete in the pairs event.

Athlete	Event	SP / SD		FS / FD		Total	
Athlete	Event	Points	Rank	Points	Rank	Points	Rank
Cha Jun-hwan	Men's singles	83.43	16 Q	165.16	14	248.59	15
Choi Da-bin	Ladies' singles	67.77	8 Q	131.49	8	199.26	7
Kim Ha-nul	Ladies' singles	54.33	21 Q	121.38	10	175.71	13
Kim Kyu-eun / Alex Kang-chan Kam	Pairs	42.93	22	did not advance			
Yura Min / Alexander Gamelin	Ice dancing	61.22	16 Q	86.52	19	147.74	18

Team event

Athlete	Event	Short program/Short dance						Free skate/Free dance					
Athlete	Event	Men's	Ladies'	Pairs	Ice dance	Total		Men's	Ladies'	Pairs	Ice dance	Total	
Athlete	Event	Points Team points	Points Team points	Points Team points	Points Team points	Points	Rank	Points Team points	Points Team points	Points Team points	Points Team points	Points	Rank
Cha Jun-hwan (M); Choi Da-bin (L); Kim Kyu-eun / Alex Kam (P); Yura Min / Alexander Gamelin (ID)	Team event	77.70; 5	65.73; 5	52.10; 1	51.97; 2	13	9	Did Not Advance					

== Freestyle skiing ==
Aerials

Athlete	Event	Qualification				Final					
Athlete	Event	Jump 1		Jump 2		Jump 1		Jump 2		Jump 3	
Athlete	Event	Points	Rank	Points	Rank	Points	Rank	Points	Rank	Points	Rank
Kim Kyoung-eun	Women's aerials	35.67	25	44.20	19	did not advance					

Halfpipe

Athlete	Event	Qualification				Final				
Athlete	Event	Run 1	Run 2	Best	Rank	Run 1	Run 2	Run 3	Best	Rank
Lee Kang-bok	Men's halfpipe	5.80	13.00	13.00	27	did not advance				
Jang Yu-jin	Women's halfpipe	64.40	60.00	64.40	18	did not advance				

Moguls

Athlete	Event	Qualification								Final											
Athlete	Event	Run 1				Run 2				Run 1				Run 2				Run 3			
Athlete	Event	Time	Points	Total	Rank	Time	Points	Total	Rank	Time	Points	Total	Rank	Time	Points	Total	Rank	Time	Points	Total	Rank
Choi Jae-woo	Men's moguls	24.95	57.85	72.95	20	25.93	67.42	81.23	1 Q	24.86	63.04	78.26	10 Q	DNF				did not advance			
Kim Ji-hyon	Men's moguls	26.05	56.20	69.85	24	26.62	55.27	69.85	17	did not advance											
Seo Myung-joon	Men's moguls	25.02	53.44	68.45	26	25.41	65.02	69.51	18	did not advance											
Seo Jee-won	Women's moguls	30.71	55.07	68.46	19	31.55	52.16	68.46	14	did not advance											
Seo Jung-hwa	Women's moguls	41.80	15.67	16.57	30	29.45	66.77	71.58	6 Q	29.77	67.86	72.31	14	did not advance							

Slopestyle

Athlete	Event	Qualification				Final				
Athlete	Event	Run 1	Run 2	Best	Rank	Run 1	Run 2	Run 3	Best	Rank
Lee Mee-hyun	Women's slopestyle	46.80	72.80	72.80	13	did not advance				

== Ice hockey ==
Summary

Key:

- OT – Overtime
- GWS – Match decided by penalty-shootout

Team	Event	Group Stage				Qualification playoff	Quarterfinal	Semifinal	Final / BM	
Team	Event	Opposition Score	Opposition Score	Opposition Score	Rank	Opposition Score	Opposition Score	Opposition Score	Opposition Score	Rank
South Korea men's	Men's tournament	Czech Republic; L 1–2	Switzerland; L 0–8	Canada; L 0–4	4	Finland; L 2–5	did not advance			12

=== Men's tournament ===
South Korea men's national ice hockey team qualified as the host.

Team roster

- Men's team event – 1 team of 25 players

Preliminary round

Pos	Team	Pld	W	OTW	OTL	L	GF	GA	GD	Pts	Qualification
1	Czech Republic	3	2	1	0	0	9	4	+5	8	Quarterfinals
2	Canada	3	2	0	1	0	11	4	+7	7	Quarterfinals
3	Switzerland	3	1	0	0	2	10	9	+1	3	Qualification playoffs
4	South Korea (H)	3	0	0	0	3	1	14	−13	0	Qualification playoffs

Source: IIHF
(H) Host

15 February 2018; 21:10	Czech Republic	2–1 (2–1, 0–0, 0–0)	South Korea	Gangneung Hockey Centre, Pyeongchang; Attendance: 6,025

Game reference

Pavel Francouz
Goalies
Matt Dalton
Referees:
(United States) Mark Lemelin
(Sweden) Linus Öhlund
Linesmen:
(Sweden) Henrik Pihlblad
(Finland) Sakari Suominen

	0–1	07:34 – Cho M.H. (Radunske, Swift)
Kovář (Řepík, Sekáč) (PP) – 11:59	1–1
Řepík (Birner, Francouz) (SH) – 16:18	2–1

8 min
Penalties
6 min
40
Shots
18

17 February 2018; 16:40	South Korea	0–8 (0–1, 0–2, 0–5)	Switzerland	Gangneung Hockey Centre, Pyeongchang; Attendance: 6,568

Game reference

Matt Dalton
Park Sung-je
Goalies
Jonas Hiller
Referees:
(Czech Republic) Jan Hribik
(Finland) Aleksi Rantala
Linesmen:
(Czech Republic) Miroslav Lhotský
(United States) Fraser McIntyre

0–1	10:23 – Hollenstein (Haas, Loeffel)
0–2	27:36 – Du Bois
0–3	35:55 – Suter (Herzog)
0–4	43:50 – Rüfenacht (Untersander, Almond)
0–5	45:17 – Suter (Ambühl, Moser)
0–6	46:45 – Schäppi (Almond, Geering)
0–7	51:24 – Suter (Geering, Ambühl)
0–8	55:10 – Corvi (Hofmann, Du Bois)

8 min
Penalties
10 min
25
Shots
34

18 February 2018; 21:10	Canada	4–0 (1–0, 1–0, 2–0)	South Korea	Gangneung Hockey Centre, Gangneung; Attendance: 6,038

Game reference

Kevin Poulin
Goalies
Matt Dalton
Referees:
(Slovakia) Jozef Kubuš
(Switzerland) Daniel Stricker
Linesmen:
(Switzerland) Nicolas Fluri
(Czech Republic) Vít Lederer

Thomas (Genoway, Wolski) – 07:36	1–0
O'Dell (Gragnani, Noreau) – 34:22	2–0
Lapierre (Roy) – 45:43	3–0
Brulé (Lee, Roy) (PP) – 58:02	4–0

8 min
Penalties
8 min
49
Shots
19

Qualification playoff

20 February 2018; 21:10	Finland	5–2 (1–0, 2–2, 2–0)	South Korea	Gangneung Hockey Centre, Pyeongchang; Attendance: 5,409

Game reference

Mikko Koskinen
Goalies
Matt Dalton
Referees:
(Russia) Roman Gofman
(United States) Timothy Mayer
Linesmen:
(Switzerland) Nicolas Fluri
(Russia) Gleb Lazarev

Kontiola (Tolvanen, Kemppainen) (PP) – 04:42	1–0
Kontiola (Lepistö, Tolvanen) (PP) – 23:44	2–0
Heiskanen (Tolvanen) – 26:23	3–0
	3–1	30:06 – Radunske (Regan, Kim S.W.)
	3–2	32:09 – Ahn J.H. (Shin S.H.)
Hietanen (Osala, Savinainen) (PP) – 47:20	4–2
Manninen (Hietanen, Koskiranta) (ENG) – 59:53	5–2

2 min
Penalties
8 min
36
Shots
19

=== Women's tournament ===
South Korea women's national ice hockey team qualified as the host. In January 2018, it was announced that the South Korean team would be amalgamated with a group of North Korean players to form a single Korean team in the tournament. In this team, at least three North Korean players were selected for each game.

== Luge ==
Based on the results from the World Cups during the 2017–18 Luge World Cup season, South Korea qualified four sleds.

Athlete	Event	Run 1		Run 2		Run 3		Run 4		Total	
Athlete	Event	Time	Rank	Time	Rank	Time	Rank	Time	Rank	Time	Rank
Lim Nam-kyu	Men's singles	49.461	31	48.591	28	48.620	29	did not advance		2:26.672	30
Cho Jung-myung; Park Jin-yong	Men's doubles	46.396	10	46.276	8	—N/a				1:32.672	9
Aileen Frisch	Women's singles	46.350	5	46.456	9	46.751	13	46.843	11	3:06.400	8
Sung Eun-ryung	Women's singles	46.918	18	46.851	20	47.205	18	47.276	18	3:08.250	18

Mixed team relay

Athlete	Event	Run 1		Run 2		Run 3		Total	
Athlete	Event	Time	Rank	Time	Rank	Time	Rank	Time	Rank
Aileen Frisch; Lim Nam-kyu; Cho Jung-myung; Park Jin-yong	Team relay	47.211	6	49.854	13	49.478	8	2:26.543	9

== Nordic combined ==
Athlete	Event	Ski jumping			Cross-country		Total	
Athlete	Event	Distance	Points	Rank	Time	Rank	Time	Rank
Park Je-un	Normal hill/10 km	86.0	73.3	42	27:07.5	47	30:56.5	46
Park Je-un	Large hill/10 km	104.5	60.4	48	26:14.8	45	31:28.8	47

== Short-track speed skating ==
According to the ISU Special Olympic Qualification Rankings, South Korea qualified a full squad of five men and five women each.

Men

Athlete	Event	Heat		Quarterfinal		Semifinal		Final	
Athlete	Event	Time	Rank	Time	Rank	Time	Rank	Time	Rank
Hwang Dae-heon	500 m	40.758	1 Q	40.861	2 Q	40.108	1 FA	39.854	2nd place, silver medalist(s)
Hwang Dae-heon	1000 m	1:24.457	1 Q	PEN		did not advance			17
Hwang Dae-heon	1500 m	2:15.561	1 Q	—N/a		2:11.469	2 FA	DNF	14
Lim Hyo-jun	500 m	40.418	1 Q	40.400	1 Q	40.132	2 FA	39.919	3rd place, bronze medalist(s)
Lim Hyo-jun	1000 m	1:23.971	1 Q	1:24.095	1 Q	1:26.463	1 FA	1:33.312	4
Lim Hyo-jun	1500 m	2:13.891	1 Q	—N/a		2:11.389	1 FA	2:10.485 OR	1st place, gold medalist(s)
Seo Yi-ra	500 m	40.438	1 Q	1:17.779	4	did not advance			14
Seo Yi-ra	1000 m	1:24.734	2 Q	1:24.053	1 Q	1:24.252	2 FA	1:31.619	3rd place, bronze medalist(s)
Seo Yi-ra	1500 m	2:18.750	1 Q	—N/a		2:11.126	3 FB	2:26.346	9
Hwang Dae-heon; Kim Do-kyoum; Kwak Yoon-gy; Lim Hyo-jun; Seo Yi-ra	5000 m relay	—N/a				6:34.510 OR	1 FA	6:42.118	4

Women

Athlete	Event	Heat		Quarterfinal		Semifinal		Final	
Athlete	Event	Time	Rank	Time	Rank	Time	Rank	Time	Rank
Choi Min-jeong	500 m	42.870 OR	1 Q	42.996	2 Q	42.442 OR	1 FA	PEN	6
Choi Min-jeong	1000 m	1:31.190	1 Q	1:30.940	1 Q	1:31.131	3 AA	1:42.434	4
Choi Min-jeong	1500 m	2:24.595	1 Q	—N/a		2:22.295	1 FA	2:24.948	1st place, gold medalist(s)
Kim A-lang	500 m	43.724	3	did not advance					19
Kim A-lang	1000 m	1:30.459	1 Q	1:30.137	2 Q	1:29.212	3 FB	—	5
Kim A-lang	1500 m	2:20.891	1 Q	—N/a		2:22.691	1 FA	2:25.941	4
Shim Suk-hee	500 m	43.048	3	did not advance					17
Shim Suk-hee	1000 m	1:34.940	1 Q	1:29.159	1 Q	1:30.974	2 FA	PEN	6
Shim Suk-hee	1500 m	2:39.984	3	—N/a		did not advance			29
Choi Min-jeong; Kim A-lang; Kim Ye-jin; Lee Yu-bin; Shim Suk-hee	3000 m relay	—N/a				4:06.387 OR	1 FA	4:07.361	1st place, gold medalist(s)

Key: AA – Advanced to medal round due to being impeded by another skater; ADV – Advanced due to being impeded by another skater; FA – Qualified to medal round; FB – Qualified to consolation round

== Skeleton ==
Based on the world rankings, South Korea qualified three sleds.

Athlete	Event	Run 1		Run 2		Run 3		Run 4		Total	
Athlete	Event	Time	Rank	Time	Rank	Time	Rank	Time	Rank	Time	Rank
Kim Ji-soo	Men's	50.80	4	50.86	6	50.51	4	50.81	6	3:22.98	6
Yun Sung-bin	Men's	50.28	1	50.07	1	50.18	1	50.02	1	3:20.55	1st place, gold medalist(s)
Jeong Sophia	Women's	52.47	13	52.67	15	52.47	15	52.28	12	3:29.89	15

== Ski jumping ==
Athlete	Event	Qualification			First round			Final			Total	
Athlete	Event	Distance	Points	Rank	Distance	Points	Rank	Distance	Points	Rank	Points	Rank
Choi Seo-u	Men's normal hill	89.0	94.7	39 Q	93.5	83.9	41	did not advance				
Choi Seo-u	Men's large hill	114.5	73.5	46 Q	114.0	93.2	45	did not advance				
Kim Hyun-ki	Men's normal hill	84.0	83.1	52	did not advance							
Kim Hyun-ki	Men's large hill	101.5	46.4	55	did not advance							
Kim Hyun-ki; Park Je-un; Choi Heung-chul; Choi Seo-u	Men's team large hill	—N/a			409.5	274.5	12	did not advance				
Park Guy-lim	Women's normal hill	—N/a			56.0	14.2	35	Did Not Advance				

== Snowboarding ==
Freestyle

Athlete	Event	Qualification				Final				
Athlete	Event	Run 1	Run 2	Best	Rank	Run 1	Run 2	Run 3	Best	Rank
Lee Min-sik	Men's big air	68.75	72.25	72.25	14	did not advance				
Lee Min-sik	Men's slopestyle	DNS								
Kim Ho-jun	Men's halfpipe	54.50	10.25	54.50	24	did not advance				
Kweon Lee-jun	Men's halfpipe	58.50	62.75	62.75	21	did not advance				
Lee Kwang-ki	Men's halfpipe	75.00	72.00	75.00	14	did not advance				
Kwon Sun-oo	Women's halfpipe	19.25	35.00	35.00	20	did not advance				

Parallel

Athlete	Event	Qualification		Round of 16	Quarterfinal	Semifinal	Final / BM	
Athlete	Event	Time	Rank	Opposition Time	Opposition Time	Opposition Time	Opposition Time	Rank
Choi Bo-gun	Men's giant slalom	1:26.78	26	did not advance				
Kim Sang-kyum	Men's giant slalom	1:25.88	15 Q	Košir (SLO); L +1.14	did not advance			
Lee Sang-ho	Men's giant slalom	1:25.06	3 Q	Sarsembaev (OAR); W –0.54	Karl (AUT); W –0.94	Košir (SLO); W –0.01	Galmarini (SUI); L +0.43	2nd place, silver medalist(s)
Jeong Hae-rim	Women's giant slalom	1:34.11	20	did not advance				
Shin Da-hae	Women's giant slalom	1:36.04	25	did not advance				

== Speed skating ==
Men

Athlete	Event	Race	
Athlete	Event	Time	Rank
Cha Min-kyu	500 m	34.42	2nd place, silver medalist(s)
Cha Min-kyu	1000 m	1:09.27	12
Chung Jae-woong	1000 m	1:09.43	13
Joo Hyong-jun	1500 m	1:46.65	17
Kim Jun-ho	500 m	35.01	12
Kim Min-seok	1500 m	1:44.93	3rd place, bronze medalist(s)
Kim Tae-yun	1000 m	1:08.22	3rd place, bronze medalist(s)
Lee Seung-hoon	5000 m	6:14.15	5
Lee Seung-hoon	10,000 m	12:55.54	4
Mo Tae-bum	500 m	35.154	16

Women

Athlete	Event	Race	
Athlete	Event	Time	Rank
Kim Bo-reum	3000 m	4:12.79	18
Kim Hyun-yung	500 m	38.251	12
Kim Hyun-yung	1000 m	1:16.366	18
Kim Min-sun	500 m	38.534	16
Lee Sang-hwa	500 m	37.33	2nd place, silver medalist(s)
Noh Seon-yeong	1500 m	1:58.75	14
Park Seung-hi	1000 m	1:16.11	16

Mass start

Athlete	Event	Semifinal			Final		
Athlete	Event	Points	Time	Rank	Points	Time	Rank
Chung Jae-won	Men's mass start	5	8:17.02	6 Q	1	8:32.71	8
Lee Seung-hoon	Men's mass start	5	8:45.37	6 Q	60	7:43.97	1st place, gold medalist(s)
Kim Bo-reum	Women's mass start	4	9:22.21	6 Q	40	8:32.99	2nd place, silver medalist(s)
Park Ji-woo	Women's mass start	1	8:33.43	9	did not advance		

Team pursuit

Athlete	Event	Quarterfinal		Semifinal		Final	
Athlete	Event	Opposition Time	Rank	Opposition Time	Rank	Opposition Time	Rank
Chung Jae-won; Kim Min-seok; Lee Seung-hoon; Joo Hyong-jun ^{**}	Men's team pursuit	Italy; W 3:39.29	1 Q	New Zealand; W 3:38.82	1 FA	Norway; L 3:38.52	2nd place, silver medalist(s)
Kim Bo-reum; Noh Seon-yeong; Park Ji-woo; Park Seung-hi ^{**}	Women's team pursuit	Netherlands; L 3:03.76	7 FD	did not advance		Poland; L 3:07.30	8

^{**} Did not play.

== Notes ==
^{a} Park Je-un took part in two sports: Nordic combined and ski jumping.

^{b} South Korea did not march at the Parade of Nations. Its delegates marched in the opening ceremony, together with North Korea's delegates, as a unified "Korea" team. South Korean bobsleigher Won Yun-jong along with North Korean ice hockey player Hwang Chung-gum were the flagbearers of this unified Korea team.

== See also ==
- South Korea at the 2017 Asian Winter Games
- North Korea at the 2018 Winter Olympics
- Korea at the 2018 Winter Olympics
