= Xiakaini Aerchenghazi =

Chinese speed skater

Personal information
- Nationality: Chinese
- Born: 18 July 1995 (age 30) Ürümqi, Xinjiang, China
- Height: 1.85 m (6 ft 1 in)
- Weight: 83 kg (183 lb)

Sport
- Sport: Speed skating

Xiakaini Aerchenghazi
- Chinese: 阿尔成哈孜·夏开尼
Transcriptions
Standard Mandarin
- Hanyu Pinyin: Ā'ěrchénghāzī Xiàkāiní
- IPA: [á ɚ̀ ʈʂʰə̀ŋ xá tsɹ̩́ ɕjâ kʰái nǐ]

Xiakaini Aerchenghazi (Chinese: 阿尔成哈孜·夏开尼; pinyin: Ā'ěrchénghāzī Xiàkāiní, Kazakh: Шакен Аршынғазы, romanized: Şaken Arşınğazı; born 18 July 1995) is a Chinese speed skater of Kazakh ethnicity. He competed in the 2018 Winter Olympics.
