= Czech Republic at the 2022 Winter Olympics =

- Flag of the Czech Republic
- IOC code: CZE
- NOC: Czech Olympic Committee
- Website: www.olympic.cz (in Czech)

in Beijing, China 4–20 February 2022
- Competitors: 114 (59 men and 55 women) in 15 sports
- Flag bearers (opening): Michal Březina; Alena Mills
- Flag bearer (closing): Martina Sáblíková
- Medals Ranked 21st: Gold 1 Silver 0 Bronze 1 Total 2

Winter Olympics appearances (overview)
- 1994; 1998; 2002; 2006; 2010; 2014; 2018; 2022; 2026

Other related appearances
- Czechoslovakia (1924–1992)

The Czech Republic competed at the 2022 Winter Olympics in Beijing, China, from 4 to 20 February 2022.

Michal Březina and Alena Mills were the country's flagbearer during the opening ceremony. Meanwhile speed skater Martina Sáblíková was the flagbearer during the closing ceremony.

After winning seven medals in 2018, the Czech Republic's medal haul fell to a single gold and single bronze medal in Beijing, marking its weakest performance since 1994.

== Medalists ==
The following Czech competitors won medals at the games. In the discipline sections below, the medalists' names are bolded.

| Medal | Name | Sport | Event | Date |
|---|---|---|---|---|
| Gold | Ester Ledecká | Snowboarding | Women's parallel giant slalom | 8 February |
| Bronze | Martina Sáblíková | Speed skating | Women's 5000 m | 10 February |

== Competitors ==
The following is the list of number of competitors participating at the Games per sport/discipline.

| Sport | Men | Women | Total |
|---|---|---|---|
| Alpine skiing | 2 | 6 | 8 |
| Biathlon | 5 | 5 | 10 |
| Bobsleigh | 4 | 0 | 4 |
| Cross-country skiing | 6 | 5 | 11 |
| Curling | 1 | 1 | 2 |
| Figure skating | 3 | 3 | 6 |
| Freestyle skiing | 0 | 1 | 1 |
| Ice hockey | 25 | 23 | 48 |
| Luge | 3 | 1 | 4 |
| Nordic combined | 4 | —N/a | 4 |
| Short track speed skating | 0 | 1 | 1 |
| Skeleton | 0 | 1 | 1 |
| Ski jumping | 5 | 3 | 8 |
| Snowboarding | 1 | 4 | 5 |
| Speed skating | 0 | 2 | 2 |
| Total | 59 | 55 (Note: Ester Ledecká participates in both alpine skiing and snowboarding.) | 114 |

== Alpine skiing ==
The Czech Republic qualified two men and six women alpine skiers.

Men

| Athlete | Event | Run 1 | | Run 2 | | Total | |
| Athlete | Event | Time | Rank | Time | Rank | Time | Rank |
|---|---|---|---|---|---|---|---|
| Kryštof Krýzl | Giant slalom | 1:07.29 | 26 | 1:08.27 | 19 | 2:15.56 | 19 |
| Kryštof Krýzl | Slalom | DNF | | Did not advance | | | |
| Jan Zabystřan | Combined | 1:44.54 | 9 | DNF | | | |
| Jan Zabystřan | Giant slalom | DNF | | Did not advance | | | |
| Jan Zabystřan | Slalom | DNF | | Did not advance | | | |
| Jan Zabystřan | Super-G | —N/a | | | | 1:23.09 | 25 |

Women

| Athlete | Event | Run 1 | | Run 2 | | Total | |
| Athlete | Event | Time | Rank | Time | Rank | Time | Rank |
|---|---|---|---|---|---|---|---|
| Ester Ledecká | Combined | 1:32.43 | 2 | 55.89 | 5 | 2:28.32 | 4 |
| Tereza Nová | Combined | 1:37.07 | 23 | 58.39 | 12 | 2:35.46 | 14 |
| Ester Ledecká | Downhill | —N/a | | | | 1:38.18 | 27 |
| Tereza Nová | Downhill | —N/a | | | | 1:39.38 | 28 |
| Barbora Nováková | Downhill | —N/a | | | | 1:39.50 | 29 |
| Elese Sommerová | Giant slalom | DNF | | Did not advance | | | |
| Gabriela Capová | Slalom | 55.96 | 33 | 55.28 | 33 | 1:51.24 | 32 |
| Martina Dubovská | Slalom | 53.90 | 16 | 53.13 | 14 | 1:47.03 | 13 |
| Elese Sommerová | Slalom | 56.38 | 38 | DNF | | —N/a | |
| Ester Ledecká | Super-G | —N/a | | | | 1:13.94 | 5 |
| Tereza Nová | Super-G | —N/a | | | | 1:17.88 | 33 |
| Barbora Nováková | Super-G | —N/a | | | | 1:18.26 | 36 |

Mixed

| Athlete | Event | Round of 16 | Quarterfinals | Semifinals | Final / BM | |
| Athlete | Event | Opposition Result | Opposition Result | Opposition Result | Opposition Result | Rank |
|---|---|---|---|---|---|---|
| Kryštof Krýzl; Jan Zabystřan; Barbora Nováková; Elese Sommerová | Team | France; **L** 1–3 | Did not advance | | | 14 |

== Biathlon ==
Based on their Nations Cup rankings in the 2021–22 Biathlon World Cup, the Czech Republic has qualified a team of 5 men and 5 women.

Men

| Athlete | Event | Time | Misses | Rank |
|---|---|---|---|---|
| Mikuláš Karlík | Individual | 52:56.3 | 3 (0+0+0+3) | 31 |
| Michal Krčmář | Individual | 55:27.9 | 5 (0+1+3+1) | 59 |
| Jakub Štvrtecký | Individual | 55:52.7 | 5 (0+3+0+2) | 65 |
| Milan Žemlička | Individual | 55:44.3 | 2 (0+1+0+1) | 62 |
| Mikuláš Karlík | Sprint | 25:48.8 | 3 (0+3) | 28 |
| Michal Krčmář | Sprint | 25:22.4 | 1 (0+1) | 16 |
| Jakub Štvrtecký | Sprint | 26:48.3 | 3 (1+2) | 58 |
| Adam Václavík | Sprint | 26:50.2 | 3 (2+1) | 59 |
| Mikuláš Karlík | Pursuit | 45:38,8 | 8 (1+3+3+1) | 42 |
| Michal Krčmář | Pursuit | 44:06,9 | 7 (1+0+4+1) | 34 |
| Jakub Štvrtecký | Pursuit | 46:32,1 | 7 (0+3+3+1) | 48 |
| Adam Václavík | Pursuit | 45:41,2 | 6 (1+1+3+1) | 44 |
| Michal Krčmář | Mass start | 41:54.9 | 5 (0+1+1+3) | 21 |
| Jakub Štvrtecký; Mikuláš Karlík; Adam Václavík; Michal Krčmář | Team relay | LAP | | 19 |

Women

| Athlete | Event | Time | Misses | Rank |
|---|---|---|---|---|
| Markéta Davidová | Individual | 43:44.6 | 1 (0+0+0+1) | 6 |
| Lucie Charvátová | Individual | 44:46.6 | 2 (0+1+0+1) | 19 |
| Jessica Jislová | Individual | 46:17.5 | 2 (0+1+0+1) | 27 |
| Tereza Voborníková | Individual | 46:51.6 | 2 (0+0+1+1) | 34 |
| Markéta Davidová | Sprint | 23:11.8 | 4 (2+2) | 41 |
| Lucie Charvátová | Sprint | 22:35.6 | 1 (0+1) | 25 |
| Jessica Jislová | Sprint | 22:42.7 | 1 (1+0) | 31 |
| Tereza Voborníková | Sprint | 23:30.9 | 2 (2+0) | 58 |
| Markéta Davidová | Pursuit | 44:44.6 | 4 (1+1+1+1) | 28 |
| Lucie Charvátová | Pursuit | 46:46.6 | 4 (2+1+0+1) | 34 |
| Jessica Jislová | Pursuit | 48:17.5 | 2 (0+1+0+1) | 35 |
| Tereza Voborníková | Pursuit | LAP | – | – |
| Markéta Davidová | Mass start | 41:11.4 | 4 (1+0+1+2) | 4 |
| Lucie Charvátová | Mass start | 44:28.7 | 5 (0+2+2+1) | 28 |
| Eva Puskarčíková; Markéta Davidová; Jessica Jislová; Lucie Charvátová | Team relay | 1:14:06.0 | 9 (1+8) | 8 |

Mixed

| Athlete | Event | Time | Misses | Rank |
|---|---|---|---|---|
| Markéta Davidová; Jessica Jislová; Mikuláš Karlík; Michal Krčmář | Relay | 1:10:20.2 | 20 (3+17) | 12 |

== Bobsleigh ==
Based on their rankings in the 2021–22 Bobsleigh World Cup, the Czech Republic has qualified 2 sleds.

| Athlete | Event | Run 1 | | Run 2 | | Run 3 | | Run 4 | | Total | |
| Athlete | Event | Time | Rank | Time | Rank | Time | Rank | Time | Rank | Time | Rank |
|---|---|---|---|---|---|---|---|---|---|---|---|
| Dominik Dvořák*; Jakub Nosek | Two-man | 59.90 | 15 | 1:00.04 | 11 | 1:00.20 | 16 | 1:00.16 | 13 | 4:00.30 | 15 |
| Dominik Dvořák*; Jakub Nosek; Jan Šindelář; Dominik Záleský | Four-man | 59.71 | 23 | 59.80 | 21 | 59.65 | 22 | Did not advance | | 2:59.16 | 21 |

* – Denotes the driver of each sled

== Cross-country skiing ==
The Czech Republic will be sending a team of six male and five female cross-country skiers.

Distance
Men

| Athlete | Event | Classical | | Freestyle | | Final | | |
| Athlete | Event | Time | Rank | Time | Rank | Time | Deficit | Rank |
|---|---|---|---|---|---|---|---|---|
| Adam Fellner | Men's 15 km classical | —N/a | | | | 41:01.0 | +3:06.2 | 31 |
| Petr Knop | Men's 15 km classical | —N/a | | | | 42:34.4 | +4:39.6 | 54 |
| Michal Novák | Men's 15 km classical | —N/a | | | | 42:06.6 | +4:11.8 | 50 |
| Jan Pechoušek | Men's 15 km classical | —N/a | | | | DNS | | - |
| Adam Fellner | 30 km skiathlon | 43:22.6 | 47 | 41:42.8 | 41 | 1:25:39.5 | +9:29.7 | 46 |
| Petr Knop | 30 km skiathlon | 44:06.8 | 52 | 40:55.9 | 33 | 1:25:38.4 | +9:28.6 | 44 |
| Michal Novák | 30 km skiathlon | 41:14.9 | 16 | 39:06.1 | 23 | 1:20:50.9 | +4:41.1 | 18 |
| Adam Fellner | Men's 50 km freestyle | —N/a | | | | 1:18:14.3 | +6:41.6 | 42 |
| Petr Knop | Men's 50 km freestyle | —N/a | | | | 1:16:35.0 | +5:02.3 | 37 |
| Michal Novák | Men's 50 km freestyle | —N/a | | | | DNS | | |
| Adam Fellner; Petr Knop; Michal Novák; Jan Pechoušek | 4 × 10 km relay | —N/a | | | | 2:04:57.8 | +10:07.1 | 12 |

Women

| Athlete | Event | Classical | | Freestyle | | Final | | |
| Athlete | Event | Time | Rank | Time | Rank | Time | Deficit | Rank |
|---|---|---|---|---|---|---|---|---|
| Petra Hynčicová | Women's 10 km classical | —N/a | | | | 31:28.0 | +3:21.7 | 42 |
| Kateřina Janatová | Women's 10 km classical | —N/a | | | | 31:07.2 | +3:00.9 | 34 |
| Petra Nováková | Women's 10 km classical | —N/a | | | | 31:00.7 | +2:54.4 | 30 |
| Petra Hynčicová | 15 km skiathlon | 24:25.8 | 27 | 23:34.3 | 30 | 48:40.8 | +4:27.1 | 26 |
| Petra Nováková | 15 km skiathlon | 44:06.8 | 52 | 40:55.9 | 33 | 1:25:38.4 | +9:28.6 | 30 |
| Petra Hynčicová | 30 km freestyle | —N/a | | | | 1:36:26.6 | +11:32.6 | 41 |
| Kateřina Janatová | 30 km freestyle | —N/a | | | | 1:31:43.2 | +6:49.2 | 22 |
| Petra Nováková | 30 km freestyle | —N/a | | | | Did not finish | | |
| Tereza Beranová; Petra Nováková; Kateřina Janatová; Petra Hynčicová | 4 x 5 km relay | —N/a | | | | 59:32.6 | +5:51.6 | 13 |

Sprint

| Athlete | Event | Qualification | | Quarterfinal | | Semifinal | | Final | |
| Athlete | Event | Time | Rank | Time | Rank | Time | Rank | Time | Rank |
|---|---|---|---|---|---|---|---|---|---|
| Ondřej Černý | Men's individual | 2:50.65 | 9 **Q** | 3:10.62 | 6 | Did not advance | | | 26 |
| Michal Novák | Men's individual | 2:52.49 | 21 **Q** | 2:55.36 | 5 | Did not advance | | | 23 |
| Jan Pechoušek | Men's individual | 2:55.03 | 33 | Did not advance | | | | | 33 |
| Luděk Šeller | Men's individual | 2:54.09 | 29 **Q** | 3:01.83 | 6 | Did not advance | | | 29 |
| Michal Novák; Luděk Šeller | Men's team | —N/a | | | | 20:36.70 | 7 | Did not advance | 14 |
| Tereza Beranová | Women's individual | 3:22.20 | 22 **Q** | 3:22.59 | 4 | Did not advance | | | 20 |
| Zuzana Holíková | Women's individual | 3:29.63 | 44 | Did not advance | | | | | 44 |
| Petra Hynčicová | Women's individual | 3:24.51 | 33 | Did not advance | | | | | 33 |
| Kateřina Janatová | Women's individual | 3:20.80 | 15 **Q** | 3:20.12 | 4 | Did not advance | | | 19 |
| Petra Hynčicová; Kateřina Janatová | Women's team | —N/a | | | | 23:55.59 | 8 | Did not advance | 15 |

== Curling ==
Czech Republic's curling team consisted of two athletes (one per gender), competing in the mixed doubles tournament.

Summary

| Team | Event | Round robin | | | | | | | | | | Semifinal | Final / BM | |
| Team | Event | Opposition Score | Opposition Score | Opposition Score | Opposition Score | Opposition Score | Opposition Score | Opposition Score | Opposition Score | Opposition Score | Rank | Opposition Score | Opposition Score | Rank |
|---|---|---|---|---|---|---|---|---|---|---|---|---|---|---|
| Zuzana Paulová; Tomáš Paul | Mixed doubles tournament | NOR; **W** 7–6 | SWE; **L** 4–7 | AUS; **W** 8–2 | ITA; **L** 2–10 | GBR; **L** 3–8 | SUI; **L** 3–11 | USA; **W** 10–8 | CAN; **L** 5–7 | CHN; **W** 8–6 | 6 | Did not advance | | |

=== Mixed doubles tournament ===
Czech Republic has qualified their mixed doubles team (two athletes), by finishing in the top seven teams in the 2021 World Mixed Doubles Curling Championship.

Final Round Robin Standings
| Team | Athletes | Pld | W | L | W–L | PF | PA | EW | EL | BE | SE | S% | DSC | Qualification |
|---|---|---|---|---|---|---|---|---|---|---|---|---|---|---|
| Italy | Stefania Constantini / Amos Mosaner | 9 | 9 | 0 | – | 79 | 48 | 43 | 28 | 0 | 17 | 79% | 25.34 | Playoffs |
| Norway | Kristin Skaslien / Magnus Nedregotten | 9 | 6 | 3 | 1–0 | 68 | 50 | 40 | 28 | 0 | 15 | 82% | 24.48 | Playoffs |
| Great Britain | Jennifer Dodds / Bruce Mouat | 9 | 6 | 3 | 0–1 | 60 | 50 | 38 | 33 | 0 | 12 | 79% | 22.48 | Playoffs |
| Sweden | Almida de Val / Oskar Eriksson | 9 | 5 | 4 | 1–0 | 55 | 54 | 35 | 33 | 0 | 10 | 76% | 21.77 | Playoffs |
| Canada | Rachel Homan / John Morris | 9 | 5 | 4 | 0–1 | 57 | 54 | 33 | 39 | 0 | 8 | 78% | 53.73 | |
| Czech Republic | Zuzana Paulová / Tomáš Paul | 9 | 4 | 5 | – | 50 | 65 | 29 | 39 | 1 | 7 | 75% | 33.41 | |
| Switzerland | Jenny Perret / Martin Rios | 9 | 3 | 6 | 1–0 | 55 | 58 | 32 | 39 | 0 | 6 | 73% | 39.04 | |
| United States | Vicky Persinger / Chris Plys | 9 | 3 | 6 | 0–1 | 50 | 67 | 34 | 36 | 0 | 9 | 74% | 27.29 | |
| China | Fan Suyuan / Ling Zhi | 9 | 2 | 7 | 1–0 | 51 | 64 | 34 | 36 | 0 | 7 | 74% | 17.81 | |
| Australia | Tahli Gill / Dean Hewitt | 9 | 2 | 7 | 0–1 | 52 | 67 | 31 | 38 | 1 | 8 | 72% | 50.51 | |

Round robin

Czech Republic had a bye in draws 3, 5, 7 and 12.

Draw 1

Wednesday, 2 February, 20:05

| **Sheet C** | **1** | **2** | **3** | **4** | **5** | **6** | **7** | **8** | **9** | **Final** |
| Norway (Skaslien / Nedregotten) | 1 | 1 | 0 | 1 | 0 | 2 | 1 | 0 | 0 | **6** |
| **Czech Republic (Paulová / Paul) 🔨** | 0 | 0 | 2 | 0 | 1 | 0 | 0 | 3 | 1 | **7** |

Draw 2

Thursday, 3 February, 9:05

| **Sheet B** | **1** | **2** | **3** | **4** | **5** | **6** | **7** | **8** | **Final** |
| **Sweden (de Val / Eriksson) 🔨** | 1 | 0 | 0 | 1 | 1 | 0 | 2 | 2 | **7** |
| Czech Republic (Paulová / Paul) | 0 | 1 | 1 | 0 | 0 | 2 | 0 | 0 | **4** |

Draw 4

Thursday, 3 February, 20:05

| **Sheet D** | **1** | **2** | **3** | **4** | **5** | **6** | **7** | **8** | **Final** |
| **Czech Republic (Paulová / Paul) 🔨** | 1 | 3 | 1 | 0 | 1 | 0 | 2 | X | **8** |
| Australia (Gill / Hewitt) | 0 | 0 | 0 | 1 | 0 | 1 | 0 | X | **2** |

Draw 6

Friday, 4 February, 13:35

| **Sheet A** | **1** | **2** | **3** | **4** | **5** | **6** | **7** | **8** | **Final** |
| Czech Republic (Paulová / Paul) | 0 | 0 | 1 | 0 | 0 | 1 | X | X | **2** |
| **Italy (Constantini / Mosaner) 🔨** | 4 | 1 | 0 | 4 | 1 | 0 | X | X | **10** |

Draw 8

Saturday, 5 February, 14:05

| **Sheet B** | **1** | **2** | **3** | **4** | **5** | **6** | **7** | **8** | **Final** |
| Czech Republic (Paulová / Paul) 🔨 | 1 | 0 | 0 | 1 | 0 | 1 | 0 | X | **3** |
| **Great Britain (Dodds / Mouat)** | 0 | 2 | 3 | 0 | 1 | 0 | 2 | X | **8** |

Draw 9

Saturday, 5 February, 20:05

| **Sheet C** | **1** | **2** | **3** | **4** | **5** | **6** | **7** | **8** | **Final** |
| Czech Republic (Paulová / Paul) | 0 | 0 | 0 | 0 | 0 | 3 | 0 | X | **3** |
| **Switzerland (Perret / Rios) 🔨** | 3 | 1 | 3 | 2 | 1 | 0 | 1 | X | **11** |

Draw 10

Sunday, 6 February, 9:05

| **Sheet A** | **1** | **2** | **3** | **4** | **5** | **6** | **7** | **8** | **Final** |
| United States (Persinger / Plys) | 1 | 0 | 3 | 0 | 3 | 0 | 1 | 0 | **8** |
| **Czech Republic (Paulová / Paul) 🔨** | 0 | 3 | 0 | 4 | 0 | 0 | 0 | 3 | **10** |

Draw 11

Sunday, 6 February, 14:05

| **Sheet D** | **1** | **2** | **3** | **4** | **5** | **6** | **7** | **8** | **9** | **Final** |
| **Canada (Homan / Morris)** | 0 | 1 | 0 | 1 | 1 | 0 | 0 | 2 | 2 | **7** |
| Czech Republic (Paulová / Paul) 🔨 | 1 | 0 | 1 | 0 | 0 | 2 | 1 | 0 | 0 | **5** |

Draw 13

Monday, 7 February, 9:05

| **Sheet D** | **1** | **2** | **3** | **4** | **5** | **6** | **7** | **8** | **Final** |
| **Czech Republic (Paulová / Paul)** | 0 | 1 | 0 | 0 | 0 | 4 | 1 | 2 | **8** |
| China (Fan / Ling) 🔨 | 1 | 0 | 3 | 1 | 1 | 0 | 0 | 0 | **6** |

== Figure skating ==
Czech skaters earned one quota place each in men's singles, ladies' singles and pair skating at the 2021 World Figure Skating Championships in Stockholm, and one quota place in ice dancing at the 2021 CS Nebelhorn Trophy. The Czech Figure Skating Association has stated that the specific skaters who earned Olympic quotas are automatically entitled to use them.

| Athlete | Event | SP / SD | | FS / FD | | Total | |
| Athlete | Event | Points | Rank | Points | Rank | Points | Rank |
|---|---|---|---|---|---|---|---|
| Michal Březina | Men's singles | 75.19 | 25 | Did not advance | | | |
| Eliška Březinová | Ladies' singles | 64.31 | 12 **Q** | 111.10 | 21 | 175.41 | 20 |
| Elizaveta Zhuk; Martin Bidař | Pairs | 54.64 | 17 | Did not advance | | | |
| Natálie Taschlerová; Filip Taschler | Ice dancing | 67.22 | 17 **Q** | 101.10 | 17 | 168.32 | 16 |

Team event

| Athlete | Event | Short program/Short dance | | | | | | Free skate/Free dance | | | | | |
| Athlete | Event | Men's | Ladies' | Pairs | Ice dance | Total | | Men's | Ladies' | Pairs | Ice dance | Total | |
| Athlete | Event | Points Team points | Points Team points | Points Team points | Points Team points | Points | Rank | Points Team points | Points Team points | Points Team points | Points Team points | Points | Rank |
|---|---|---|---|---|---|---|---|---|---|---|---|---|---|
| Michal Březina; Eliška Březinová; Elizaveta Zhuk / Martin Bidař; Natálie Taschlerová / Filip Taschler | Team event | 76.77; 4 | 61.05; 3 | 56.70; 3 | 68.99; 5 | 15 | 8 | Did not advance | | | | | |

== Freestyle skiing ==
Ski cross

| Athlete | Event | Seeding | | Round of 16 | Quarterfinal | Semifinal | Final | |
| Athlete | Event | Time | Rank | Position | Position | Position | Position | Rank |
|---|---|---|---|---|---|---|---|---|
| Nikol Kučerová | Women's ski cross | 1:21.96 | 23 | 3 | Did not advance | | | 23 |

== Ice hockey ==
Summary

Key:

- OT – Overtime
- GWS – Match decided by penalty-shootout

| Team | Event | Group stage | | | | | Qualification playoff | Quarterfinal | Semifinal | Final / BM | |
| Team | Event | Opposition Score | Opposition Score | Opposition Score | Opposition Score | Rank | Opposition Score | Opposition Score | Opposition Score | Opposition Score | Rank |
|---|---|---|---|---|---|---|---|---|---|---|---|
| Czech Republic men's | Men's tournament | Denmark; **L** 1–2 | Switzerland; **W** 2–1 GWS | ROC; **W** 6–5 GWS | —N/a | 3 | Switzerland; **L** 2–4 | Did not advance | | | 9 |
| Czech Republic women's | Women's tournament | China; **W** 3–1 | Sweden; **W** 3–1 | Denmark; **L** 2–3 | Japan; **L** 2–3 GWS | 2 **Q** | —N/a | United States; **L** 1–4 | Did not advance | | 7 |

The Czech Republic has qualified 25 male and 23 female competitors in ice hockey. This is the first time the Czech Republic has qualified a women's team to the Olympics.

=== Men's tournament ===
The Czech Republic men's national ice hockey team qualified by being ranked 5th in the 2019 IIHF World Rankings.

Team roster

The roster was announced on 13 January 2022.

Head coach: Filip Pešán

| No. | Pos. | Name | Height | Weight | Birthdate | Team |
|---|---|---|---|---|---|---|
| 3 | D | Ronald Knot | 1.93 m (6 ft 4 in) | 95 kg (209 lb) | 3 August 1994 (aged 27) | (Russia) Neftekhimik Nizhnekamsk |
| 5 | D | Jakub Jeřábek (**A**) | 1.80 m (5 ft 11 in) | 88 kg (194 lb) | 12 May 1991 (aged 30) | (Russia) Spartak Moscow |
| 9 | D | David Sklenička | 1.80 m (5 ft 11 in) | 82 kg (181 lb) | 8 September 1996 (aged 25) | (Finland) Jokerit |
| 10 | F | Roman Červenka (**C**) | 1.82 m (6 ft 0 in) | 89 kg (196 lb) | 10 December 1985 (aged 36) | (Switzerland) Rapperswil-Jona Lakers |
| 13 | F | Jiří Smejkal | 1.89 m (6 ft 2 in) | 83 kg (183 lb) | 5 November 1996 (aged 25) | (Finland) Lahti Pelicans |
| 17 | F | Vladimír Sobotka | 1.80 m (5 ft 11 in) | 89 kg (196 lb) | 2 July 1987 (aged 34) | (Czech Republic) Sparta Praha |
| 20 | F | Hynek Zohorna | 1.88 m (6 ft 2 in) | 94 kg (207 lb) | 1 August 1990 (aged 31) | (Sweden) IK Oskarshamn |
| 25 | F | Radan Lenc | 1.80 m (5 ft 11 in) | 79 kg (174 lb) | 30 July 1991 (aged 30) | (Russia) Amur Khabarovsk |
| 26 | F | Michal Řepík | 1.79 m (5 ft 10 in) | 86 kg (190 lb) | 31 December 1988 (aged 33) | (Czech Republic) Sparta Praha |
| 30 | G | Šimon Hrubec | 1.86 m (6 ft 1 in) | 83 kg (183 lb) | 30 June 1991 (aged 30) | (Russia) Avangard Omsk |
| 31 | D | Lukáš Klok | 1.85 m (6 ft 1 in) | 85 kg (187 lb) | 7 June 1995 (aged 26) | (Russia) Neftekhimik Nizhnekamsk |
| 35 | G | Roman Will | 1.80 m (5 ft 11 in) | 85 kg (187 lb) | 22 May 1992 (aged 29) | (Russia) Traktor Chelyabinsk |
| 37 | G | Patrik Bartošák | 1.85 m (6 ft 1 in) | 90 kg (200 lb) | 29 March 1993 (aged 28) | (Russia) Amur Khabarovsk |
| 38 | F | Tomáš Hyka | 1.80 m (5 ft 11 in) | 84 kg (185 lb) | 23 March 1993 (aged 28) | (Russia) Traktor Chelyabinsk |
| 43 | F | Jan Kovář | 1.81 m (5 ft 11 in) | 98 kg (216 lb) | 20 March 1990 (aged 31) | (Switzerland) EV Zug |
| 44 | F | Matěj Stránský | 1.91 m (6 ft 3 in) | 93 kg (205 lb) | 11 July 1993 (aged 28) | (Switzerland) HC Davos |
| 45 | F | Lukáš Sedlák | 1.82 m (6 ft 0 in) | 96 kg (212 lb) | 25 February 1993 (aged 28) | (Russia) Traktor Chelyabinsk |
| 46 | F | David Krejčí (**A**) | 1.83 m (6 ft 0 in) | 85 kg (187 lb) | 28 April 1986 (aged 35) | (Czech Republic) HC Olomouc |
| 52 | F | Michael Špaček | 1.80 m (5 ft 11 in) | 85 kg (187 lb) | 9 April 1997 (aged 24) | (Sweden) Frölunda HC |
| 65 | D | Vojtěch Mozík | 1.90 m (6 ft 3 in) | 91 kg (201 lb) | 26 December 1992 (aged 29) | (Russia) Admiral Vladivostok |
| 67 | F | Michael Frolík | 1.85 m (6 ft 1 in) | 86 kg (190 lb) | 17 February 1988 (aged 33) | (Switzerland) Lausanne HC |
| 79 | F | Tomáš Zohorna | 1.85 m (6 ft 1 in) | 95 kg (209 lb) | 3 January 1988 (aged 34) | (Sweden) IK Oskarshamn |
| 84 | D | Tomáš Kundrátek | 1.87 m (6 ft 2 in) | 91 kg (201 lb) | 26 December 1989 (aged 32) | (Czech Republic) Oceláři Třinec |
| 88 | D | Libor Šulák | 1.89 m (6 ft 2 in) | 86 kg (190 lb) | 4 March 1994 (aged 27) | (Russia) Admiral Vladivostok |

Group play

| Pos | Team | Pld | W | OTW | OTL | L | GF | GA | GD | Pts | Qualification |
|---|---|---|---|---|---|---|---|---|---|---|---|
| 1 | ROC | 3 | 2 | 0 | 1 | 0 | 8 | 6 | +2 | **7** | Quarterfinals |
| 2 | Denmark | 3 | 2 | 0 | 0 | 1 | 7 | 6 | +1 | **6** | Playoffs |
| 3 | Czech Republic | 3 | 0 | 2 | 0 | 1 | 9 | 8 | +1 | **4** | Playoffs |
| 4 | Switzerland | 3 | 0 | 0 | 1 | 2 | 4 | 8 | −4 | **1** | Playoffs |

Source: IIHF

| February 9, 2022; 21:10 v | Czech Republic | **1–2** (0–2, 1–0, 0–0) | **Denmark** | Beijing National Indoor Stadium, Beijing; Attendance: 891 |

Game reference

Šimon Hrubec
Goalies
Sebastian Dahm
Referees:
(Canada) Oliver Gouin
(Switzerland) Michael Tscherrig
Linesmen:
(Sweden) Ludvig Lundgren
(Finland) Lauri Nikulainen

| | 0–1 | 11:21 – Lauridsen |
| | 0–2 | 17:23 – Nielsen (PS) |
| Červenka (Kovář) – 23:45 | 1–2 |

2 min
Penalties
6 min
40
Shots
17

| February 11, 2022; 16:40 v | **Czech Republic** | **2–1 GWS** (1–1, 0–0, 0–0) (OT: 0–0) (SO: 1–0) | Switzerland | Beijing National Indoor Stadium, Beijing; Attendance: 834 |

Game reference
| Šimon Hrubec | Goalies | Leonardo Genoni | Referees: (Latvia) Andris Ansons (United States) Andrew Bruggeman; Linesmen: (Russia) Gleb Lazarev (Canada) Dustin McCrank |
| Smejkal (Klok, Zohorna) – 04:33 / 1–0; / 1–1 / 08:34 – Haas (Andrighetto) (PP) | | | Referees: (Latvia) Andris Ansons (United States) Andrew Bruggeman; Linesmen: (Russia) Gleb Lazarev (Canada) Dustin McCrank |
| Krejčí; Sedlák (miss); Kovář (miss); Řepík (miss) | Shootout | (miss) Ambühl; (miss) Andrighetto; (miss) Corvi; (miss) Bertschy; (miss) Haas | Referees: (Latvia) Andris Ansons (United States) Andrew Bruggeman; Linesmen: (Russia) Gleb Lazarev (Canada) Dustin McCrank |
| 10 min | Penalties | 4 min | Referees: (Latvia) Andris Ansons (United States) Andrew Bruggeman; Linesmen: (Russia) Gleb Lazarev (Canada) Dustin McCrank |
| 36 | Shots | 25 | Referees: (Latvia) Andris Ansons (United States) Andrew Bruggeman; Linesmen: (Russia) Gleb Lazarev (Canada) Dustin McCrank |

| February 12, 2022; 21:10 v | ROC | **5–6 OT** (1–1, 1–2, 3–2) (OT: 0–1) | **Czech Republic** | Beijing National Indoor Stadium, Beijing; Attendance: 921 |

Game reference

Ivan Fedotov
Goalies
Šimon Hrubec
Referees:
(Finland) Mikko Kaukokari
(Sweden) Mikael Nord
Linesmen:
(Sweden) Ludvig Lundgren
(Finland) Lauri Nikulainen

| Tkachyov (Gusev, Nesterov) – 04:51 | 1–0 |
| | 1–1 | 12:37 – Kundrátek (Červenka, Stránský) (PP) |
| Nesterov (Gusev, Plotnikov) (PP) – 32:19 | 2–1 |
| | 2–2 | 38:41 – Krejčí (Červenka, Kundrátek) (PP) |
| | 2–3 | 39:16 – Špaček (Šulák, Sobotka) (PP) |
| | 2–4 | 43:14 – Klok (T. Zohorna, H. Zohorna) |
| Semyonov (Plotnikov, Andronov) – 43:50 | 3–4 |
| Gritsyuk (Gusev, Tkachyov) – 46:43 | 4–4 |
| Chibisov (Voynov, Shipachyov) – 48:22 | 5–4 |
| | 5–5 | 48:57 – Hyka (Sedlák, Krejčí) |
| | 5–6 | 64:29 – Šulák (Krejčí) (PP) |

33 min
Penalties
10 min
29
Shots
41

Playoffs

| February 15, 2022; 16:40 v | Czech Republic | **2–4** (1–2, 0–1, 1–1) | **Switzerland** | Beijing National Indoor Stadium, Beijing; Attendance: 990 |

Game reference

Šimon Hrubec
Goalies
Leonardo Genoni
Referees:
(Russia) Roman Gofman
(Finland) Mikko Kaukokari
Linesmen:
(Sweden) Ludvig Lundgren
(Sweden) Andreas Malmqvist

| Klok (Knot, Červenka) – 10:08 | 1–0 |
| | 1–1 | 14:59 – Ambühl (Thürkauf, Corvi) (PP) |
| | 1–2 | 15:12 – Mottet (Hollenstein, Diaz) |
| | 1–3 | 29:53 – Malgin (Alatalo, Andrighetto) (PP) |
| | 1–4 | 54:57 – Diaz (Andrighetto, Herzog) |
| Červenka (Krejčí, Kovář) (PP, EA) – 55:59 | 2–4 |

6 min
Penalties
4 min
33
Shots
18

=== Women's tournament ===
The Czech Republic women's national ice hockey team qualified by winning a final qualification tournament.

Team roster

The roster was announced on 13 January 2022.

Head coach: Tomáš Pacina

| No. | Pos. | Name | Height | Weight | Birthdate | Team |
|---|---|---|---|---|---|---|
| 1 | G | Viktorie Švejdová | 1.68 m (5 ft 6 in) | 65 kg (143 lb) | 24 June 2002 (aged 19) | (Sweden) Modo Hockey |
| 2 | D | Aneta Tejralová | 1.64 m (5 ft 5 in) | 53 kg (117 lb) | 4 January 1996 (aged 26) | (Russia) SKIF Nizhny Novgorod |
| 4 | D | Daniela Pejšová | 1.73 m (5 ft 8 in) | 73 kg (161 lb) | 14 August 2002 (aged 19) | (Sweden) Modo Hockey |
| 5 | D | Samantha Kolowratová | 1.70 m (5 ft 7 in) | 71 kg (157 lb) | 12 July 1996 (aged 25) | (Sweden) Brynäs IF |
| 7 | F | Lenka Serdar | 1.72 m (5 ft 8 in) | 63 kg (139 lb) | 21 July 1997 (aged 24) | (Sweden) Linköping HC |
| 9 | F | Alena Mills – **C** | 1.73 m (5 ft 8 in) | 80 kg (180 lb) | 9 June 1990 (aged 31) | (China) KRS Vanke Rays |
| 10 | F | Denisa Křížová | 1.65 m (5 ft 5 in) | 68 kg (150 lb) | 3 November 1994 (aged 27) | (Sweden) Brynäs IF |
| 12 | F | Klára Hymlárová | 1.62 m (5 ft 4 in) | 67 kg (148 lb) | 27 February 1999 (aged 22) | (United States) St. Cloud State Huskies |
| 14 | D | Dominika Lásková | 1.64 m (5 ft 5 in) | 71 kg (157 lb) | 20 December 1996 (aged 25) | (United States) Merrimack Warriors |
| 15 | F | Aneta Lédlová | 1.68 m (5 ft 6 in) | 76 kg (168 lb) | 31 December 1996 (aged 25) | (Czech Republic) SK Trhači Kadaň |
| 16 | F | Kateřina Mrázová | 1.63 m (5 ft 4 in) | 64 kg (141 lb) | 19 October 1992 (aged 29) | (Sweden) Brynäs IF |
| 17 | D | Pavlína Horálková | 1.66 m (5 ft 5 in) | 61 kg (134 lb) | 24 May 1991 (aged 30) | (Russia) Biryusa Krasnoyarsk |
| 18 | F | Michaela Pejzlová | 1.70 m (5 ft 7 in) | 66 kg (146 lb) | 4 June 1997 (aged 24) | (Finland) HIFK |
| 19 | F | Natálie Mlýnková | 1.61 m (5 ft 3 in) | 63 kg (139 lb) | 24 May 2001 (aged 20) | (United States) Vermont Catamounts |
| 21 | F | Tereza Vanišová | 1.70 m (5 ft 7 in) | 64 kg (141 lb) | 30 January 1996 (aged 26) | (Sweden) Leksands IF |
| 23 | F | Kateřina Bukolská | 1.70 m (5 ft 7 in) | 70 kg (150 lb) | 6 March 1997 (aged 24) | (Sweden) Leksands IF |
| 24 | D | Sára Čajanová | 1.68 m (5 ft 6 in) | 63 kg (139 lb) | 10 December 2002 (aged 19) | (Czech Republic) HC Bobři Valašské Meziříčí |
| 25 | F | Kristýna Pátková | 1.67 m (5 ft 6 in) | 69 kg (152 lb) | 17 June 1998 (aged 23) | (United States) Vermont Catamounts |
| 26 | F | Vendula Přibylová | 1.71 m (5 ft 7 in) | 78 kg (172 lb) | 23 March 1996 (aged 25) | (Sweden) AIK IF |
| 27 | D | Tereza Radová | 1.72 m (5 ft 8 in) | 73 kg (161 lb) | 22 November 2001 (aged 20) | (Sweden) Göteborg HC |
| 28 | F | Noemi Neubauerová | 1.73 m (5 ft 8 in) | 69 kg (152 lb) | 15 December 1999 (aged 22) | (United States) Colgate Raiders |
| 29 | G | Klára Peslarová | 1.64 m (5 ft 5 in) | 63 kg (139 lb) | 23 November 1996 (aged 25) | (Sweden) Modo Hockey |
| 30 | G | Kateřina Zechovská | 1.65 m (5 ft 5 in) | 78 kg (172 lb) | 4 November 1998 (aged 23) | (Czech Republic) HC Draci Bílina |

Group play

| Pos | Team | Pld | W | OTW | OTL | L | GF | GA | GD | Pts | Qualification |
|---|---|---|---|---|---|---|---|---|---|---|---|
| 1 | Japan | 4 | 2 | 1 | 1 | 0 | 13 | 7 | +6 | **9** | Quarterfinals |
| 2 | Czech Republic | 4 | 2 | 0 | 1 | 1 | 10 | 8 | +2 | **7** | Quarterfinals |
| 3 | Sweden | 4 | 2 | 0 | 0 | 2 | 7 | 8 | −1 | **6** | Quarterfinals |
| 4 | China (H) | 4 | 1 | 1 | 0 | 2 | 7 | 7 | 0 | **5** | Eliminated |
| 5 | Denmark | 4 | 1 | 0 | 0 | 3 | 7 | 14 | −7 | **3** | Eliminated |

Source: IIHF
Rules for classification: Tiebreakers
(H) Host

| 3 February 2022; 12:10 v | **Czech Republic** | **3–1** (1–0, 1–1, 1–0) | China | Wukesong Arena, Beijing; Attendance: 499 |

Game reference

Klára Peslarová
Goalies
Tia Chan
Referees:
(Germany) Tijana Haack
(Finland) Anniina Nurmi
Linesmen:
(Sweden) Anna Hammar
(Austria) Julia Kainberger

| Radová (Vanišová, Mrázová) – 10:38 | 1–0 |
| Křížová (Neubauerová, Čajanová) – 23:57 | 2–0 |
| | 2–1 | 29:02 – Miller (Lum, Wong) (PP) |
| Pejzlová (Horálková) – 46:27 | 3–1 |

4 min
Penalties
6 min
36
Shots
14

| 5 February 2022; 16:40 v | **Czech Republic** | **3–1** (1–0, 1–1, 1–0) | Sweden | Beijing National Indoor Stadium, Beijing; Attendance: 438 |

Game reference

Klára Peslarová
Goalies
Emma Söderberg
Referees:
(Canada) Cianna Lieffers
(Canada) Elizabeth Mantha
Linesmen:
(Russia) Diana Mokhova
(United States) Jacqueline Spresser

| Vanišová – 18:23 | 1–0 |
| Hymlárová (SH) – 33:56 | 2–0 |
| | 2–1 | 39:16 – Muren (Lin. Johansson, Adolfsson) |
| Vanišová – 54:03 | 3–1 |

12 min
Penalties
8 min
46
Shots
28

| 7 February 2022; 16:40 v | **Denmark** | **3–2** (1–1, 1–1, 1–0) | Czech Republic | Wukesong Arena, Beijing; Attendance: 637 |

Game reference

Cassandra Repstock-Romme
Goalies
Viktorie Švejdová
Referees:
(Sweden) Maria Furberg
(Canada) Lacey Senuk
Linesmen:
(Canada) Alex Clarke
(United States) Sara Strong

| | 0–1 | 05:48 – Tejralová (Křížová) |
| Jakobsen – 09:14 | 1–1 |
| | 1–2 | 23:01 – Mrázová (Radová, Vanišová) |
| Weis – 24:28 | 2–2 |
| Glud (Jakobsen, N. Jensen) (PP) – 40:49 | 3–2 |

12 min
Penalties
8 min
17
Shots
32

| 8 February 2022; 16:40 v | **Japan** | **3–2 GWS** (1–0, 0–1, 1–1) (OT: 0–0) (SO: 1–0) | Czech Republic | Wukesong Arena, Beijing; Attendance: 638 |

Game reference

Nana Fujimoto
Goalies
Klára Peslarová
Referees:
(Russia) Daria Abrosimova
(Russia) Daria Ermak
Linesmen:
(Germany) Lisa Linnek
(Finland) Linnea Sainio

| H. Toko (Ao. Shiga, A. Toko) (PP) – 04:00 | 1–0 |
| | 1–1 | 26:09 – Křížová (Vanišová) |
| H. Toko (Kubo, A. Toko) (PP) – 40:23 | 2–1 |
| | 2–2 | 45:53 – Mlýnková |

Ukita (miss)
Kubo
Koyama (miss)
H. Toko (miss)
Ak. Shiga (miss)
Shootout
(miss) Pátková
(miss) Křížová
(miss) Pejzlová
(miss) Mrázová
(miss) Mills
6 min
Penalties
10 min
25
Shots
38

Quarterfinals

| 11 February 2022; 12:10 v | **United States** | **4–1** (0–0, 1–1, 3–0) | Czech Republic | Wukesong Arena, Beijing; Attendance: 636 |

Game reference

Alex Cavallini
Goalies
Klára Peslarová
Referees:
(Canada) Elizabeth Mantha
(Finland) Anniina Nurmi
Linesmen:
(Sweden) Anna Hammar
(United States) Kendall Hanley

| | 0–1 | 24:59 – Pejzlová (Vanišová, Křížová) |
| Knight (Coyne Schofield) – 25:47 | 1–1 |
| Stecklein (Pannek, Keller) – 46:49 | 2–1 |
| Harmon (Brandt, Knight) (PP) – 56:51 | 3–1 |
| Coyne Schofield (Keller) (ENG) – 59:54 | 4–1 |

11 min
Penalties
10 min
59
Shots
6

== Luge ==
Based on the results from the World Cups during the 2021–22 Luge World Cup season, the Czech Republic qualified 3 sleds.

| Athlete | Event | Run 1 | | Run 2 | | Run 3 | | Run 4 | | Total | |
| Athlete | Event | Time | Rank | Time | Rank | Time | Rank | Time | Rank | Time | Rank |
|---|---|---|---|---|---|---|---|---|---|---|---|
| Michael Lejsek | Men's singles | 59.542 | 28 | 59.945 | 31 | 1:00.080 | 32 | Did not advance | | 2:59.567 | 30 |
| Zdeněk Pěkný; Filip Vejdělek | Men's doubles | 1:00.248 | 16 | 59.869 | 14 | —N/a | | | | 2:00.117 | 16 |
| Anna Čežíková | Women's singles | 1:00.392 | 28 | 1:01.169 | 30 | 1:00.101 | 29 | Did not advance | | 3:01.662 | 30 |

Mixed team relay

| Athlete | Event | Run 1 | | Run 2 | | Run 3 | | Total | |
| Athlete | Event | Time | Rank | Time | Rank | Time | Rank | Time | Rank |
|---|---|---|---|---|---|---|---|---|---|
| Anna Čežíková; Michael Lejsek; Zdeněk Pěkný; Filip Vejdělek | Team relay | 1:01.852 | 12 | 1:03.545 | 12 | 1:04.159 | 11 | 3:09.556 | 10 |

== Nordic combined ==
Czech Republic qualified 4 athletes:

| Athlete | Event | Ski jumping | | | Cross-country | | Total | |
| Athlete | Event | Distance | Points | Rank | Time | Rank | Time | Rank |
|---|---|---|---|---|---|---|---|---|
| Lukáš Daněk | Normal hill/10 km | 97.0 | 98.2 | 25 | 25:22.8 | 22 | 27:41.8 | 21 |
| Lukáš Daněk | Large hill/10 km | 117.0 | 86.1 | 31 | 27:32.3 | 30 | 31:07.3 | 30 |
| Ondřej Pažout | Normal hill/10 km | 96.0 | 99.9 | 22 | 26:19.4 | 30 | 28:31.4 | 29 |
| Ondřej Pažout | Large hill/10 km | 123.5 | 99.0 | 20 | 27:46.7 | 35 | 30:29.7 | 29 |
| Tomáš Portyk | Normal hill/10 km | 97.0 | 110.8 | 13 | 25:47.4 | 26 | 27:16.4 | 20 |
| Tomáš Portyk | Large hill/10 km | 128.0 | 97.8 | 22 | 27:32.6 | 31 | 30:20.6 | 27 |
| Jan Vytrval | Normal hill/10 km | 92.5 | 93.5 | 29 | 25:26.7 | 24 | 28:04.7 | 26 |
| Jan Vytrval | Large hill/10 km | 125.0 | 97.0 | 23 | 26:26.1 | 14 | 29:17.1 | 18 |
| Lukáš Daněk; Ondřej Pažout; Tomáš Portyk; Jan Vytrval | Team large hill/4×5 km | 493.5 | 403.7 | 6 | 51:34.6 | 7 | 53:10.6 | 7 |

== Short track speed skating ==
The Czech Republic qualified one skater for women's 500m and 1500 m events for the Olympics during the four World Cup events in October and November 2021.

| Athlete | Event | Heat | | Quarterfinal | | Semifinal | | Final | |
| Athlete | Event | Time | Rank | Time | Rank | Time | Rank | Time | Rank |
|---|---|---|---|---|---|---|---|---|---|
| Michaela Hrůzová | Women's 500 m | 45.060 | 3 | Did not advance | | | | | 24 |
| Michaela Hrůzová | Women's 1500 m | —N/a | | 2:21.278 | 4 **q** | 2:21.386 | 4 **FB** | 2:46.664 | 14 |

== Skeleton ==
Based on the world rankings, Czech republic qualified 1 sled.

| Athlete | Event | Run 1 | | Run 2 | | Run 3 | | Run 4 | | Total | |
| Athlete | Event | Time | Rank | Time | Rank | Time | Rank | Time | Rank | Time | Rank |
|---|---|---|---|---|---|---|---|---|---|---|---|
| Anna Fernstädtová | Women's | 1:02.35 | 6 | 1:02.44 | 6 | 1:02.27 | 10 | 1:02.26 | 6 | 4:09.32 | 7 |

== Ski jumping ==
Czech Republic qualified 5 male and 3 female ski jumpers:

Men

| Athlete | Event | Qualification | | | First round | | | Final | | | Total | |
| Athlete | Event | Distance | Points | Rank | Distance | Points | Rank | Distance | Points | Rank | Points | Rank |
|---|---|---|---|---|---|---|---|---|---|---|---|---|
| Roman Koudelka | Normal hill | 93.5 | 93.4 | 19 **Q** | 102.0 | 130.4 | 11 | 97.5 | 119.1 | 22 | 249.5 | 18 |
| Čestmír Kožíšek | Normal hill | 93.0 | 91.4 | 22 **Q** | 100.0 | 119.3 | 30 | 85.0 | 92.6 | 29 | 211.9 | 29 |
| Filip Sakala | Normal hill | 67.5 | 39.2 | 51 | Did not advance | | | | | | | |
| Roman Koudelka | Large hill | 109.0 | 79.5 | 48 **Q** | 124.0 | 108.7 | 41 | Did not advance | | | | |
| Čestmír Kožíšek | Large hill | 126.0 | 107.8 | 25 **Q** | 122.5 | 108.1 | 42 | Did not advance | | | | |
| Radek Rýdl | Large hill | 105.0 | 74.5 | 50 **Q** | 118.5 | 96.7 | 47 | Did not advance | | | | |
| Filip Sakala | Large hill | 110.5 | 84.3 | 45 **Q** | 116.0 | 93.1 | 48 | Did not advance | | | | |
| Roman Koudelka; Čestmír Kožíšek; Viktor Polášek; Filip Sakala | Team large hill | —N/a | | | 425.5 | 279.5 | 9 | Did not advance | | | | |

Women

| Athlete | Event | First round | | | Final | | | Total | |
| Athlete | Event | Distance | Points | Rank | Distance | Points | Rank | Points | Rank |
|---|---|---|---|---|---|---|---|---|---|
| Anežka Indráčková | Normal hill | 79.0 | 62.8 | 29 **Q** | 72.5 | 60.5 | 28 | 123.3 | 30 |
| Karolína Indráčková | Normal hill | 82.0 | 77.4 | 24 **Q** | 65.0 | 53.3 | 30 | 130.7 | 28 |
| Klára Ulrichová | Normal hill | 70.5 | 48.2 | 33 | Did not advance | | | 48.2 | 33 |

Mixed

| Athlete | Event | First round | | | Final | | | Total | |
| Athlete | Event | Distance | Points | Rank | Distance | Points | Rank | Points | Rank |
|---|---|---|---|---|---|---|---|---|---|
| Karolína Indráčková; Roman Koudelka; Čestmír Kožíšek; Klára Ulrichová | Mixed team normal hill | 340.5 | 362.5 | 7 | 341.5 | 360.3 | 7 | 722.8 | 7 |

== Snowboarding ==
Freestyle

| Athlete | Event | Qualification | | | | | Final | | | | |
| Athlete | Event | Run 1 | Run 2 | Run 3 | Best | Rank | Run 1 | Run 2 | Run 3 | Best | Rank |
|---|---|---|---|---|---|---|---|---|---|---|---|
| Šárka Pančochová | Women's big air | ~~44.00~~ | 62.75 | 60.25 | 123.00 | 14 | Did not advance | | | | |
| Šárka Pančochová | Women's halfpipe | 41.75 | 18.75 | —N/a | 41.75 | 18 | Did not advance | | | | |
| Šárka Pančochová | Women's slopestyle | 25.51 | 17.18 | —N/a | 25.51 | 26 | Did not advance | | | | |

Parallel

| Athlete | Event | Qualification | | Round of 16 | Quarterfinal | Semifinal | Final | |
| Athlete | Event | Time | Rank | Opposition Time | Opposition Time | Opposition Time | Opposition Time | Rank |
|---|---|---|---|---|---|---|---|---|
| **Ester Ledecká** | Women's giant slalom | 1:23.63 | 1 **Q** | Ochner (ITA); **W** | Król (POL); **W** | Dekker (NED); **W** | Ulbing (AUT); **W** | 1st place, gold medalist(s) |
| Zuzana Maděrová | Women's giant slalom | 1:34.59 | 23 | Did not advance | | | | |

Snowboard cross

| Athlete | Event | Seeding | | 1/8 final | Quarterfinal | Semifinal | Final | |
| Athlete | Event | Time | Rank | Position | Position | Position | Position | Rank |
|---|---|---|---|---|---|---|---|---|
| Radek Houser | Men's | DNS | | DNS | Did not advance | | | |
| Vendula Hopjáková | Women's | 1:25.49 | 23 | DNF | Did not advance | | | 28 |

== Speed skating ==
The Czech Republic earned the following quotas at the conclusion of the four World Cup's used for qualification.

Individual

| Athlete | Event | Race | |
| Athlete | Event | Time | Rank |
|---|---|---|---|
| **Martina Sáblíková** | Women's 3000 m | 4:00.34 | 4 |
| **Martina Sáblíková** | Women's 5000 m | 6:50.09 | 3rd place, bronze medalist(s) |
| Nikola Zdráhalová | Women's 500 m | 39.18 | 25 |
| Nikola Zdráhalová | Women's 1000 m | 1:18.75 | 27 |
| Nikola Zdráhalová | Women's 1500 m | 1:59.54 | 21 |
| Nikola Zdráhalová | Women's 3000 m | 4:13.13 | 18 |

Mass start

| Athlete | Event | Semifinal | | | Final | | |
| Athlete | Event | Points | Time | Rank | Points | Time | Rank |
|---|---|---|---|---|---|---|---|
| Nikola Zdráhalová | Women's mass start | WDR | | | | | |
