= Czech Republic at the 2018 Winter Olympics =

- Flag of the Czech Republic
- IOC code: CZE
- NOC: Czech Olympic Committee
- Website: www.olympic.cz (in Czech)

in Pyeongchang, South Korea 9–25 February 2018
- Competitors: 93 (68 men and 25 women) in 13 sports
- Flag bearers: Eva Samková (opening); Ester Ledecká (closing)
- Medals Ranked 14th: Gold 2 Silver 2 Bronze 3 Total 7

Winter Olympics appearances (overview)
- 1994; 1998; 2002; 2006; 2010; 2014; 2018; 2022; 2026

Other related appearances
- Czechoslovakia (1924–1992)

Czech Republic competed at the 2018 Winter Olympics in Pyeongchang, South Korea, from 9 to 25 February 2018, with 93 competitors in 13 sports. They won seven medals in total: two gold, two silver and three bronze, ranking 14th in the medal table.

== Medalists ==
Medal	Name	Sport	Event	Date
Gold	Ester Ledecká	Alpine skiing	Women's super-G	17 February
Gold	Ester Ledecká	Snowboarding	Women's parallel giant slalom	24 February
Silver	Michal Krčmář	Biathlon	Men's sprint	11 February
Silver	Martina Sáblíková	Speed skating	Women's 5000 m	16 February
Bronze	Veronika Vítková	Biathlon	Women's sprint	10 February
Bronze	Eva Samková	Snowboarding	Women's snowboard cross	16 February
Bronze	Karolína Erbanová	Speed skating	Women's 500 m	18 February

== Competitors ==
The following is the list of number of competitors participating at the Games per sport/discipline.

Sport	Men	Women	Total
Alpine skiing	5	4	9
Biathlon	5	4	9
Bobsleigh	9	0	9
Cross-country skiing	5	5	10
Figure skating	3	2	5
Freestyle skiing	0	1	1
Ice hockey	25	0	25
Luge	5	1	6
Nordic combined	4	0	4
Short track speed skating	0	1	1
Ski jumping	5	0	5
Snowboarding	2	5	7
Speed skating	0	3	3
Total	68	25 (Note: Ester Ledecká participates in both alpine skiing and snowboarding.)	93

== Alpine skiing ==
Czech Republic has qualified 5 men and 4 women.

Men

Athlete	Event	Run 1		Run 2		Total	
Athlete	Event	Time	Rank	Time	Rank	Time	Rank
Ondřej Berndt	Super-G	—N/a				1:28.30	35
Ondřej Berndt	Combined	1:21.81	34	48.10	10	2:09.91	16
Ondřej Berndt	Giant slalom	DNF					
Ondřej Berndt	Slalom	DNF					
Filip Forejtek	Downhill	—N/a				1:44.79	38
Filip Forejtek	Super-G	—N/a				1:28.06	34
Filip Forejtek	Combined	1:22.56	45	DNF			
Filip Forejtek	Giant slalom	1:12.91	36	1:13.16	32	2:26.07	31
Filip Forejtek	Slalom	DNF					
Jan Hudec	Downhill	—N/a				1:46.42	45
Jan Hudec	Super-G	—N/a				DNF	
Adam Kotzmann	Giant slalom	DNF					
Adam Kotzmann	Slalom	DNF					
Jan Zabystřan	Downhill	—N/a				1:46.60	46
Jan Zabystřan	Super-G	—N/a				1:29.68	40
Jan Zabystřan	Combined	1:23.65	54	DNF			
Jan Zabystřan	Giant slalom	DNF					
Jan Zabystřan	Slalom	DNF					

Women

Athlete	Event	Run 1		Run 2		Total	
Athlete	Event	Time	Rank	Time	Rank	Time	Rank
Gabriela Capová	Giant slalom	1:15.80	34	1:11.62	27	2:27.42	29
Gabriela Capová	Slalom	52.96	33	DNF			
Martina Dubovská	Giant slalom	DNF					
Martina Dubovská	Slalom	52.90	32	51.87	29	1:44.77	29
Ester Ledecká	Super-G	—N/a				1:21.11	1st place, gold medalist(s)
Ester Ledecká	Giant slalom	1:14.62	29	1:10.07	16	2:24.69	23
Kateřina Pauláthová	Downhill	—N/a				1:44.69	26
Kateřina Pauláthová	Super-G	—N/a				1:24.48	33
Kateřina Pauláthová	Giant slalom	DNF					
Kateřina Pauláthová	Combined	1:44.83	20	44.26	17	2:29.09	17

Mixed

Athlete	Event	Round of 16	Quarterfinals	Semifinals	Final / BM	
Athlete	Event	Opposition Result	Opposition Result	Opposition Result	Opposition Result	Rank
Ondřej Berndt; Filip Forejtek; Gabriela Capová; Martina Dubovská	Team	Italy; L 1–3	Did not advance			

== Biathlon ==
Based on their Nations Cup rankings in the 2016–17 Biathlon World Cup, the Czech Republic has qualified a team of 5 men and 6 women.

Men

Athlete	Event	Time	Misses	Rank
Michal Krčmář	Sprint	23:43.2	0 (0+0)	2nd place, silver medalist(s)
Michal Krčmář	Pursuit	36:41.6	7 (2+0+3+2)	30
Michal Krčmář	Individual	49:19.3	1 (0+1+0+0)	7
Michal Krčmář	Mass start	38:09.9	5 (1+1+1+2)	26
Ondřej Moravec	Sprint	24:46.7	1 (1+0)	29
Ondřej Moravec	Pursuit	38:45.9	8 (1+2+2+3)	51
Ondřej Moravec	Individual	49:56.9	1 (0+0+0+1)	12
Ondřej Moravec	Mass start	36:23.6	1 (0+0+0+1)	11
Michal Šlesingr	Sprint	26:06.0	4 (0+4)	69
Michal Šlesingr	Individual	52:35.5	4 (0+3+0+1)	45
Adam Václavík	Sprint	26:15.4	4 (2+2)	73
Adam Václavík	Individual	54:31.7	6 (0+4+1+1)	67
Michal Krčmář; Ondřej Moravec; Michal Šlesingr; Jaroslav Soukup	Team relay	1:19:23.6	15 (2+13)	7

Women

Athlete	Event	Time	Misses	Rank
Markéta Davidová	Sprint	22:03.3	1 (1+0)	15
Markéta Davidová	Pursuit	33:29.8	6 (1+2+1+2)	25
Markéta Davidová	Individual	47:06.7	5 (1+1+0+3)	57
Markéta Davidová	Mass start	37:23.8	3 (0+1+1+1)	18
Jessica Jislová	Sprint	22:29.1	1 (1+0)	23
Jessica Jislová	Pursuit	33:24.3	3 (0+1+1+1)	23
Jessica Jislová	Individual	49:00.6	5 (1+1+0+3)	72
Eva Puskarčíková	Sprint	23:19.8	3 (2+1)	43
Eva Puskarčíková	Pursuit	33:53.8	3 (2+1+0+0)	32
Eva Puskarčíková	Individual	46:22.0	3 (1+0+2+0)	44
Veronika Vítková	Sprint	21:32.0	1 (0+1)	3rd place, bronze medalist(s)
Veronika Vítková	Pursuit	32:12.6	3 (0+1+0+2)	7
Veronika Vítková	Individual	44:31.5	3 (1+1+1+0)	18
Veronika Vítková	Mass start	36:57.8	1 (0+0+0+1)	14
Markéta Davidová; Jessica Jislová; Eva Puskarčíková; Veronika Vítková	Team relay	1:13:59.7	4 (0+4)	12

Mixed

Athlete	Event	Time	Misses	Rank
Michal Krčmář; Ondřej Moravec; Markéta Davidová; Veronika Vítková	Team relay	1:10:13.6	8 (5+3)	8

== Bobsleigh ==
Based on their rankings in the 2017–18 Bobsleigh World Cup, the Czech Republic has qualified 4 sleds.

Athlete	Event	Run 1		Run 2		Run 3		Run 4		Total	
Athlete	Event	Time	Rank	Time	Rank	Time	Rank	Time	Rank	Time	Rank
Jakub Havlín; Jan Vrba*	Two-man	49.93	23	50.07	21	49.86	21	Eliminated		2:29.86	23
Dominik Dvořák*; Jakub Nosek	Two-man	49.70	15	49.63	14	49.67	18	49.86	29	3:18.86	17
David Egydy; Jan Stokláska; Dominik Suchý; Jan Vrba*	Four-man	49.73	=23	49.81	21	50.05	=25	Eliminated		2:29.59	24
Dominik Dvořák*; Jaroslav Kopřiva; Jakub Nosek; Jan Šindelář	Four-man	49.07	11	49.97	26	50.05	=25	Eliminated		2:29.09	21

* – Denotes the driver of each sled

== Cross-country skiing ==
Czech Republic has qualified 5 men and 5 women.

Distance
Men

Athlete	Event	Classical		Freestyle		Final		
Athlete	Event	Time	Rank	Time	Rank	Time	Deficit	Rank
Martin Jakš	15 km freestyle	—N/a				35:05.2	+1:21.3	16
Martin Jakš	30 km skiathlon	40:53.2	19	35:27.0	4	1:16:53.8	+33.8	9
Martin Jakš	50 km classical	—N/a				2:12:32.6	+4:10.5	8
Petr Knop	15 km freestyle	—N/a				35:35.5	+1:51.6	24
Petr Knop	30 km skiathlon	42:29.8	43	37:10.7	34	1:20:12.1	+3:52.1	38
Petr Knop	50 km classical	—N/a				2:29:20.9	+20:58.8	55
Michal Novák	15 km freestyle	—N/a				36:42.4	+2:58.5	46
Aleš Razým	15 km freestyle	—N/a				35:59.0	+2:15.1	30
Aleš Razým	30 km skiathlon	43:28.5	51	39:29.3	55	1:23:33.8	+7:13.8	55
Aleš Razým	50 km classical	—N/a				2:22:06.8	+13:44.7	41
Miroslav Rypl	50 km classical	—N/a				DNF		
Martin Jakš; Petr Knop; Michal Novák; Aleš Razým	4×10 km relay	—N/a				1:37:23.0	+4:18.1	10

Women

Athlete	Event	Classical		Freestyle		Final		
Athlete	Event	Time	Rank	Time	Rank	Time	Deficit	Rank
Kateřina Beroušková	10 km freestyle	—N/a				28:14.4	+3:13.9	45
Kateřina Beroušková	15 km skiathlon	23:03.9	34	20:56.3	38	44:32.7	+3:47.8	38
Kateřina Beroušková	30 km classical	—N/a				1:31:41.4	+9:23.8	23
Barbora Havlíčková	10 km freestyle	—N/a				29:00.7	+4:00.2	57
Barbora Havlíčková	15 km skiathlon	23:52.3	53	20:48.4	35	45:12.1	+4:27.2	43
Petra Hynčicová	10 km freestyle	—N/a				29:09.9	+4:09.4	60
Petra Hynčicová	15 km skiathlon	23:42.0	48	21:22.5	47	45:42.4	+4:57.5	47
Petra Hynčicová	30 km classical	—N/a				1:39:14.7	+16:57.1	39
Petra Nováková	10 km freestyle	—N/a				27:33.8	+2:33.3	28
Petra Nováková	15 km skiathlon	23:25.9	28	19:56.9	18	43:55.6	+3:10.7	28
Kateřina Beroušková; Karolína Grohová; Barbora Havlíčková; Petra Nováková	4×5 km relay	—N/a				55:17.1	+3:52.8	11

Sprint

Athlete	Event	Qualification		Quarterfinal		Semifinal		Final	
Athlete	Event	Time	Rank	Time	Rank	Time	Rank	Time	Rank
Aleš Razým	Men's sprint	3:21.05	43	Did not advance					
Michal Novák	Men's sprint	3:28.33	60	Did not advance					
Miroslav Rypl	Men's sprint	3:27.46	56	Did not advance					
Martin Jakš; Aleš Razým	Men's team sprint	—N/a				16:08.78	5 q	16:24.83	7
Kateřina Beroušková	Women's sprint	3:20.09	23 Q	3:27.43	6	Did not advance			
Karolína Grohová	Women's sprint	3:30.91	43	Did not advance					
Petra Hynčicová	Women's sprint	3:32.03	45	Did not advance					
Kateřina Beroušková; Petra Nováková	Women's team sprint	—N/a				16:53.06	5	Did not advance	

== Figure skating ==
The Czech Republic has qualified one male figure skater, based on its placement at the 2017 World Figure Skating Championships in Helsinki, Finland. They additionally qualified one entry in ice dance as well as an entry in pairs skating through the 2017 CS Nebelhorn Trophy. The team was announced on October 7 2017.

Athlete	Event	SP / SD		FS / FD		Total	
Athlete	Event	Points	Rank	Points	Rank	Points	Rank
Michal Březina	Men's singles	85.15	9 Q	160.92	18	246.07	16
Anna Dušková / Martin Bidař	Pairs	63.25	15 Q	123.08	14	186.33	14
Cortney Mansour / Michal Češka	Ice dancing	53.53	23	Did not advance			

== Freestyle skiing ==
Ski cross

Athlete	Event	Seeding		Round of 16	Quarterfinal	Semifinal	Final	
Athlete	Event	Time	Rank	Position	Position	Position	Position	Rank
Nikol Kučerová	Women's ski cross	1:15.61	13	2	4	Did not advance		

== Ice hockey ==
Summary

Key:

- OT – Overtime
- GWS – Match decided by penalty-shootout

Team	Event	Group Stage				Qualification playoff	Quarterfinal	Semifinal	Final / BM	
Team	Event	Opposition Score	Opposition Score	Opposition Score	Rank	Opposition Score	Opposition Score	Opposition Score	Opposition Score	Rank
Czech Republic men's hockey team	Men's tournament	South Korea; W 2–1	Canada; W 3–2 GWS	Switzerland; W 4–1	1 QQ	Bye	United States; W 3–2 GWS	Olympic Athletes from Russia; L 0–3	Canada; L 4–6	4

=== Men's tournament ===
Czech Republic men's national ice hockey team qualified by finishing as one of the top eight teams in the 2015 IIHF World Ranking.

Team roster

The following is the Czech roster for the men's ice hockey tournament at the 2018 Winter Olympics.

Head coach: (Czech Republic) Josef Jandač Assistant coaches: (Czech Republic) Jiří Kalous, (Czech Republic) Václav Prospal, (Czech Republic) Jaroslav Špaček

No.	Pos.	Name	Height	Weight	Birthdate	Birthplace	2017–18 team
10	F	Roman Červenka	1.82 m (6 ft 0 in)	89 kg (196 lb)	10 December 1985	Prague, Czechoslovakia	(Switzerland) HC Fribourg-Gottéron (NL)
16	F	Michal Birner	1.83 m (6 ft 0 in)	83 kg (183 lb)	2 March 1986	Litoměřice, Czechoslovakia	(Switzerland) HC Fribourg-Gottéron (NL)
18	F	Dominik Kubalík	1.87 m (6 ft 2 in)	86 kg (190 lb)	21 August 1995	Plzeň	(Switzerland) HC Ambrì-Piotta (NL)
23	D	Ondřej Němec	1.82 m (6 ft 0 in)	93 kg (205 lb)	18 April 1984	Třebíč, Czechoslovakia	(Czech Republic) HC Kometa Brno (ELH)
27	F	Martin Růžička	1.81 m (5 ft 11 in)	81 kg (179 lb)	15 December 1985	Beroun, Czechoslovakia	(Czech Republic) HC Oceláři Třinec (ELH)
29	D	Jan Kolář – A	1.90 m (6 ft 3 in)	92 kg (203 lb)	22 November 1986	Pardubice, Czechoslovakia	(Russia) Amur Khabarovsk (KHL)
32	G	Patrik Bartošák	1.85 m (6 ft 1 in)	88 kg (194 lb)	29 March 1993	Kopřivnice	(Czech Republic) HC Vítkovice (ELH)
33	G	Pavel Francouz	1.82 m (6 ft 0 in)	81 kg (179 lb)	3 June 1990	Plzeň, Czechoslovakia	(Russia) Traktor Chelyabinsk (KHL)
38	G	Dominik Furch	1.88 m (6 ft 2 in)	91 kg (201 lb)	19 April 1990	Prague, Czechoslovakia	(Russia) Avangard Omsk (KHL)
42	F	Petr Koukal	1.77 m (5 ft 10 in)	83 kg (183 lb)	16 August 1982	Žďár nad Sázavou, Czechoslovakia	(Czech Republic) Mountfield HK (ELH)
43	F	Jan Kovář – A	1.81 m (5 ft 11 in)	98 kg (216 lb)	20 March 1990	Písek, Czechoslovakia	(Russia) Metallurg Magnitogorsk (KHL)
47	D	Michal Jordán	1.85 m (6 ft 1 in)	88 kg (194 lb)	17 July 1990	Zlín, Czechoslovakia	(Russia) Amur Khabarovsk (KHL)
51	F	Roman Horák	1.82 m (6 ft 0 in)	74 kg (163 lb)	21 May 1991	České Budějovice, Czechoslovakia	(Russia) HC Vityaz (KHL)
61	D	Adam Polášek	1.90 m (6 ft 3 in)	94 kg (207 lb)	12 July 1991	Ostrava, Czechoslovakia	(Russia) HC Sochi (KHL)
62	F	Michal Řepík	1.79 m (5 ft 10 in)	87 kg (192 lb)	31 December 1988	Vlašim, Czechoslovakia	(Czech Republic) HC Sparta Praha (ELH)
64	F	Jiří Sekáč	1.87 m (6 ft 2 in)	84 kg (185 lb)	10 June 1992	Kladno, Czechoslovakia	(Russia) Ak Bars Kazan (KHL)
65	D	Vojtěch Mozík	1.89 m (6 ft 2 in)	91 kg (201 lb)	26 December 1992	Prague, Czechoslovakia	(Russia) HC Vityaz (KHL)
69	F	Lukáš Radil	1.91 m (6 ft 3 in)	91 kg (201 lb)	5 August 1990	Čáslav, Czechoslovakia	(Russia) HC Spartak Moscow (KHL)
74	D	Ondřej Vitásek	1.93 m (6 ft 4 in)	103 kg (227 lb)	4 September 1990	Prostějov, Czechoslovakia	(Russia) HC Yugra (KHL)
79	F	Tomáš Zohorna	1.85 m (6 ft 1 in)	95 kg (209 lb)	3 January 1988	Chotěboř, Czechoslovakia	(Russia) Amur Khabarovsk (KHL)
82	F	Michal Vondrka	1.85 m (6 ft 1 in)	90 kg (200 lb)	17 May 1982	České Budějovice, Czechoslovakia	(Czech Republic) Piráti Chomutov (ELH)
84	D	Tomáš Kundrátek	1.88 m (6 ft 2 in)	94 kg (207 lb)	26 December 1989	Přerov, Czechoslovakia	(Russia) Torpedo Nizhny Novgorod (KHL)
86	F	Tomáš Mertl	1.75 m (5 ft 9 in)	82 kg (181 lb)	11 March 1986	České Budějovice, Czechoslovakia	(Czech Republic) HC Plzeň (ELH)
87	D	Jakub Nakládal	1.87 m (6 ft 2 in)	90 kg (200 lb)	30 December 1987	Pardubice, Czechoslovakia	(Russia) Lokomotiv Yaroslavl (KHL)
91	F	Martin Erat – C	1.79 m (5 ft 10 in)	90 kg (200 lb)	29 August 1981	Třebíč, Czechoslovakia	(Czech Republic) HC Kometa Brno (ELH)

Preliminary round

Pos	Team	Pld	W	OTW	OTL	L	GF	GA	GD	Pts	Qualification
1	Czech Republic	3	2	1	0	0	9	4	+5	8	Quarterfinals
2	Canada	3	2	0	1	0	11	4	+7	7	Quarterfinals
3	Switzerland	3	1	0	0	2	10	9	+1	3	Qualification playoffs
4	South Korea (H)	3	0	0	0	3	1	14	−13	0	Qualification playoffs

Source: IIHF
(H) Host

15 February 2018; 21:10	Czech Republic	2–1 (2–1, 0–0, 0–0)	South Korea	Gangneung Hockey Centre, Pyeongchang; Attendance: 6,025

Game reference

Pavel Francouz
Goalies
Matt Dalton
Referees:
(United States) Mark Lemelin
(Sweden) Linus Öhlund
Linesmen:
(Sweden) Henrik Pihlblad
(Finland) Sakari Suominen

	0–1	07:34 – Cho M.H. (Radunske, Swift)
Kovář (Řepík, Sekáč) (PP) – 11:59	1–1
Řepík (Birner, Francouz) (SH) – 16:18	2–1

8 min
Penalties
6 min
40
Shots
18

17 February 2018; 12:10	Canada	2–3 GWS (2–1, 0–1, 0–0) (OT: 0–0) (SO: 0–1)	Czech Republic	Gangneung Hockey Centre, Gangneung; Attendance: 6,731

Game reference

Ben Scrivens
Goalies
Pavel Francouz
Referees:
(Russia) Roman Gofman
(Finland) Anssi Salonen
Linesmen:
(Russia) Gleb Lazarov
(United States) Judson Ritter

Raymond (Vey, Gragnani) (PP) – 01:13	1–0
	1–1	06:52 – Kubalík
Bourque (Noreau, Brulé) (PP) – 13:30	2–1
	2–2	20:25 – Jordán (Birner, Horák)

Lapierre (miss)
Wolski
Roy (miss)
Bourque (miss)
Noreau (miss)
Shootout
(miss) Růžička
Koukal
Kovář
(miss) Červenka
6 min
Penalties
10 min
33
Shots
21

18 February 2018; 16:40	Czech Republic	4–1 (1–1, 0–0, 3–0)	Switzerland	Gangneung Hockey Centre, Pyeongchang; Attendance: 6,137

Game reference

Pavel Francouz
Goalies
Jonas Hiller
Referees:
(Canada) Brett Iverson
(Russia) Konstantin Olenin
Linesmen:
(United States) Judson Ritter
(Canada) Nathan Vanoosten

Řepík (Erat, Horák) (PP) – 07:09	1–0
	1–1	14:47 – Rüfenacht (Ambühl, Suter)
Kubalík (Kovář, Kolář) – 43:02	2–1
Červenka (Kolář) (ENG) – 58:40	3–1
Řepík (Birner, Nakládal) (ENG) – 59:11	4–1

10 min
Penalties
2 min
28
Shots
29

Quarterfinal

21 February 2018; 12:10	Czech Republic	3–2 GWS (1–1, 1–1, 0–0) (OT: 0–0) (SO: 1–0)	United States	Gangneung Hockey Centre, Pyeongchang; Attendance: 2,948

Game reference

Pavel Francouz
Goalies
Ryan Zapolski
Referees:
(Canada) Oliver Gouin
(Sweden) Linus Öhlund
Linesmen:
(Switzerland) Roman Kaderli
(Finland) Hannu Sormunen

	0–1	06:20 – Donato (Terry)
Kolář (Kovář) – 15:12	1–1
Kundrátek (Růžička, Mozík) – 28:14	2–1
	2–2	30:23 – Slater (O'Neill) (SH)

Růžička (miss)
Koukal
Kovář (miss)
Kubalík (miss)
Kundrátek (miss)
Shootout
(miss) Bourque
(miss) Donato
(miss) Arcobello
(miss) Terry
(miss) Butler
10 min
Penalties
8 min
29
Shots
20

Semifinal

23 February 2018; 16:40	Czech Republic	0–3 (0–0, 0–2, 0–1)	Olympic Athletes from Russia	Gangneung Hockey Centre, Pyeongchang; Attendance: 4,330

Game reference

Pavel Francouz
Goalies
Vasily Koshechkin
Referees:
(Canada) Brett Iverson
(United States) Mark Lemelin
Linesmen:
(Sweden) Jimmy Dahmen
(Finland) Sakari Suominen

0–1	27:47 – Gusev (Datsyuk)
0–2	28:14 – Gavrikov (Telegin, Grigorenko)
0–3	59:39 – Kovalchuk (Zub, Zubarev) (ENG)

6 min
Penalties
10 min
31
Shots
22

Bronze medal game

24 February 2018; 21:10	Czech Republic	4–6 (1–3, 0–0, 3–3)	Canada (bronze)	Gangneung Hockey Centre, Pyeongchang; Attendance: 4,807

Game reference

Pavel Francouz
Goalies
Kevin Poulin
Referees:
(United States) Timothy Mayer
(Russia) Konstantin Olenin
Linesmen:
(United States) Fraser McIntyre
(Russia) Alexander Otmakhov

	0–1	08:57 – Ebbett (Robinson, Gragnani) (PP)
Růžička (Červenka) – 09:13	1–1
	1–2	09:28 – Kelly (Goloubef, Klinkhammer)
	1–3	15:57 – Roy (Kozun, Bourque)
	1–4	45:50 – Ebbett (Kozun, Goloubef)
Kovář (Horák, Řepík) (EA) – 46:36	2–4
	2–5	49:37 – Kelly (Klinkhammer)
	2–6	55:23 – Wolski (Howden)
Červenka (Nakládal, Mertl) – 56:26	3–6
Červenka (Polášek, Mozík) (PP, EA) – 57:55	4–6

4 min
Penalties
6 min
34
Shots
26

== Luge ==
Based on the results from the World Cups during the 2017–18 Luge World Cup season, the Czech Republic qualified 4 sleds.

Athlete	Event	Run 1		Run 2		Run 3		Run 4		Total	
Athlete	Event	Time	Rank	Time	Rank	Time	Rank	Time	Rank	Time	Rank
Ondřej Hyman	Men's singles	48.324	23	48.276	20	48.313	25	Eliminated		2:24.913	21
Lukáš Brož; Antonín Brož	Men's doubles	46.570	12	46.582	16	—N/a				1:33.152	13
Matěj Kvíčala; Jaromír Kudera	Men's doubles	46.818	16	46.910	18	—N/a				1:33.728	18
Tereza Nosková	Women's singles	47.813	26	48.132	27	47.921	27	Eliminated		2:23.866	26

Mixed team relay

Athlete	Event	Run 1		Run 2		Run 3		Total	
Athlete	Event	Time	Rank	Time	Rank	Time	Rank	Time	Rank
Tereza Nosková; Ondřej Hyman; Lukáš Brož; Antonín Brož	Team relay	48.238	12	49.178	10	49.645	11	2:27.061	12

== Nordic combined ==
Czech Republic qualified 4 athletes:

Athlete	Event	Ski jumping			Cross-country		Total	
Athlete	Event	Distance	Points	Rank	Time	Rank	Time	Rank
Lukáš Daněk	Normal hill/10 km	DSQ			DNS		DNF	
Lukáš Daněk	Large hill/10 km	114.0	78.7	44	26:36.1	46	30:37.1	46
Miroslav Dvořák	Normal hill/10 km	95.5	89.3	28	24:40.4	14	27:23.4	21
Miroslav Dvořák	Large hill/10 km	119.5	99.9	29	24:23.3	29	26:59.3	26
Ondřej Pažout	Normal hill/10 km	97.5	95.8	22	25:46.8	37	28:05.8	34
Ondřej Pažout	Large hill/10 km	124.5	105.2	26	25:32.4	41	27:47.4	37
Tomáš Portyk	Normal hill/10 km	89.5	89.3	29	24:46.4	17	27:31.4	24
Tomáš Portyk	Large hill/10 km	120.5	111.5	18	24:04.9	19	25:54.9	19
Lukáš Daněk; Miroslav Dvořák; Ondřej Pažout; Tomáš Portyk	Team large hill/4×5 km	494.0	382.2	6	48:11.1	8	50:07.1	7

== Short track speed skating ==
The Czech Republic qualified one skater for women's 1500 m events for the Olympics during the four World Cup events in November 2017.

Athlete	Event	Heat		Semifinal		Final	
Athlete	Event	Time	Rank	Time	Rank	Time	Rank
Michaela Sejpalová	Women's 1500 m	2:30.012	4	Did not advance			

== Ski jumping ==
Czech Republic qualified 5 male ski jumpers:

Athlete	Event	Qualification			First round			Final			Total	
Athlete	Event	Distance	Points	Rank	Distance	Points	Rank	Distance	Points	Rank	Points	Rank
Lukáš Hlava	Men's large hill	106.5	62.2	52	Did not advance							
Roman Koudelka	Men's normal hill	97.5	114.5	24 Q	98.0	103.5	25 Q	103.0	105.7	25	209.2	25
Roman Koudelka	Men's large hill	116.5	80.9	41 Q	125.5	115.9	25 Q	122.0	107.1	25	223.0	25
Čestmír Kožíšek	Men's normal hill	81.0	80.6	54	Did not advance							
Čestmír Kožíšek	Men's large hill	132.5	104.0	23 Q	112.0	124.5	28 Q	113.0	93.	28	205.1	28
Viktor Polášek	Men's normal hill	88.0	90.1	47 Q	92.0	81.9	44	Did not advance				
Viktor Polášek	Men's large hill	110.5	77.1	45 Q	116.5	94.4	44	Did not advance				
Vojtěch Štursa	Men's normal hill	83.5	81.5	53	Did not advance							
Roman Koudelka; Čestmír Kožíšek; Viktor Polášek; Vojtěch Štursa	Men's team large hill	—N/a			458.5	370.1	10	Did not advance				

== Snowboarding ==
Freestyle

Athlete	Event	Qualification				Final				
Athlete	Event	Run 1	Run 2	Best	Rank	Run 1	Run 2	Run 3	Best	Rank
Petr Horák	Men's slopestyle	41.93	39.05	41.93	15	Did not advance				
Šárka Pančochová	Women's big air	65.50	30.00	65.50	19	Did not advance				
Šárka Pančochová	Women's slopestyle	Cancelled				43.46	39.18	CAN	43.46	16
Kateřina Vojáčková	Women's big air	19.00	10.50	19.00	26	Did not advance				

Parallel

Athlete	Event	Qualification		Round of 16	Quarterfinal	Semifinal	Final	
Athlete	Event	Time	Rank	Opposition Time	Opposition Time	Opposition Time	Opposition Time	Rank
Ester Ledecká	Women's giant slalom	1:28.90	1 Q	Kummer (SUI); W –0.71	Ulbing (AUT); W –0.97	Hofmeister (GER); W DNF	Jörg (GER); W –0.45	1st place, gold medalist(s)

Snowboard cross

Athlete	Event	Seeding						1/8 final	Quarterfinal	Semifinal	Final	
Athlete	Event	Run 1		Run 2		Best	Seed	1/8 final	Quarterfinal	Semifinal	Final	
Athlete	Event	Time	Rank	Time	Rank	Best	Seed	Position	Position	Position	Position	Rank
Jan Kubičík	Men's snowboard cross	1:15.73	=29	1:16.25	10	1:15.73	32	5	Did not advance			
Vendula Hopjáková	Women's snowboard cross	DNF		DNF		DNF	24	—N/a	DNS	Did not advance		
Eva Samková	Women's snowboard cross	1:16.84	1	Bye		1:16.84	1	—N/a	2 Q	1 FA	3	3rd place, bronze medalist(s)

== Speed skating ==
The Czech Republic earned the following quotas at the conclusion of the four World Cup's used for qualification.

Individual

Athlete	Event	Race	
Athlete	Event	Time	Rank
Karolína Erbanová	Women's 500 m	37.34	3rd place, bronze medalist(s)
Karolína Erbanová	Women's 1000 m	1:14.95	7
Martina Sáblíková	Women's 3000 m	4:00.54	4
Martina Sáblíková	Women's 5000 m	6:51.85	2nd place, silver medalist(s)
Nikola Zdráhalová
Nikola Zdráhalová	Women's 1000 m	1:16.43	19
Nikola Zdráhalová	Women's 1500 m	1:58.03	11
Nikola Zdráhalová	Women's 3000 m	4:11.36	15

Mass start

Athlete	Event	Semifinal			Final		
Athlete	Event	Points	Time	Rank	Points	Time	Rank
Nikola Zdráhalová	Women's mass start	60	8:32.22	1 Q	1	8:41.35	8
