= Short-track speed skating at the 2022 Winter Olympics – Women's 1500 metres =

Women's 1500 metres at the XXIV Olympic Winter Games
- Short track speed skating
- Venue: Capital Indoor Stadium, Beijing
- Date: 16 February 2022
- Competitors: 36 from 17 nations
- Winning time: 2:17.789

Medalists
1st place, gold medalist(s)		Choi Min-jeong	South Korea
2nd place, silver medalist(s)		Arianna Fontana	Italy
3rd place, bronze medalist(s)		Suzanne Schulting	Netherlands

The women's 1500 metres competition in short track speed skating at the 2022 Winter Olympics was held on 16 February, at the Capital Indoor Stadium in Beijing. Choi Min-jeong of South Korea, the defending champion, won the event. Arianna Fontana of Italy won the silver medal, and Suzanne Schulting of the Netherlands bronze.

The silver medalist, Li Jinyu, did not compete. The bronze medalist, Kim Boutin, qualified. Schulting was the 2021 World Short Track Speed Skating champion at all distances, including 1500 m. Courtney Sarault and Xandra Velzeboer were the silver and bronze medalists, respectively. Many top athletes did not participate in the championship, however. Lee Yu-bin was leading the 2021–22 ISU Short Track Speed Skating World Cup at the 1500 m distance with four races completed before the Olympics, followed by Schulting and Sarault.

== Qualification ==
Countries were assigned quotas based on their performance during the 2021–22 ISU Short Track Speed Skating World Cup, with the top 36 athletes (maximum of three per country qualifying quotas. If a NOC declined a quota spot, it was distributed to the next available athlete, only if the maximum quota of 56 athletes per gender was not surpassed.

== Records ==
Prior to this competition, the existing world and Olympic records were as follows.

World record	Choi Min-jeong (KOR)	2:14.354	Salt Lake City, United States	12 November 2016
Olympic record	Zhou Yang (CHN)	2:16.993	Vancouver, Canada	20 February 2010

The following records were set during the competition.

Date	Round	Athlete	Country	Time	Record	Ref
16 February	Semifinal 3	Choi Min-jeong	South Korea	2:16.831	OR	

== Results ==
=== Quarterfinals ===
Rank	Heat	Name	Country	Time	Notes
1	1	Choi Min-jeong	South Korea	2:20.846	Q
2	1	Petra Jászapáti	Hungary	2:22.115	Q
3	1	Zhang Yuting	China	2:22.161	Q
4	1	Rianne de Vries	Netherlands	2:22.244	ADV
5	1	Arianna Sighel	Italy	2:22.318	
6	1	Gwendoline Daudet	France	2:23.607	
1	2	Kim A-lang	South Korea	2:32.879	Q
2	2	Arianna Fontana	Italy	2:32.946	Q
3	2	Corinne Stoddard	United States	2:33.329	Q
4	2	Kamila Stormowska	Poland	2:33.603	
5	2	Julie Letai	United States	2:36.214	ADV
	2	Anna Seidel	Germany		PEN
1	3	Kristen Santos	United States	2:21.027	Q
2	3	Xandra Velzeboer	Netherlands	2:21.148	Q
3	3	Sumire Kikuchi	Japan	2:23.359	Q
4	3	Danaé Blais	Canada	No time	
	3	Zsófia Kónya	Hungary		PEN
	3	Olga Tikhonova	Kazakhstan		PEN
1	4	Courtney Sarault	Canada	2:20.365	Q
2	4	Anna Vostrikova	ROC	2:21.113	Q
3	4	Han Yutong	China	2:21.191	Q
4	4	Michaela Hrůzová	Czech Republic	2:21.278	q
5	4	Valentina Aščić	Croatia	2:21.456	
6	4	Tifany Huot-Marchand	France	2:23.784	
1	5	Kim Boutin	Canada	2:17.739	Q
2	5	Lee Yu-bin	South Korea	2:17.851	Q
3	5	Cynthia Mascitto	Italy	2:20.268	Q
4	5	Yuki Kikuchi	Japan	2:22.192	
5	5	Shione Kaminaga	Japan	2:22.261	
6	5	Uliana Dubrova	Ukraine	2:26.832	
1	6	Suzanne Schulting	Netherlands	2:18.810	Q
2	6	Hanne Desmet	Belgium	2:18.931	Q
3	6	Sofia Prosvirnova	ROC	2:19.432	Q
4	6	Zhang Chutong	China	2:19.839	q
5	5	Natalia Maliszewska	Poland	2:25.850	
6	6	Ekaterina Efremenkova	ROC	No time	

=== Semifinals ===
Rank	Heat	Name	Country	Time	Notes
1	1	Lee Yu-bin	South Korea	2:22.157	QA
2	1	Arianna Fontana	Italy	2:22.196	QA
3	1	Kim Boutin	Canada	2:22.371	QB
4	1	Kim A-lang	South Korea	2:22.420	QB
5	1	Sofia Prosvirnova	ROC	2:22.546	
6	1	Corinne Stoddard	United States	2:22.632	
7	1	Zhang Chutong	China	2:26.717	
1	2	Suzanne Schulting	Netherlands	2:18.942	QA
2	2	Hanne Desmet	Belgium	2:19.001	QA
3	2	Cynthia Mascitto	Italy	2:20.272	QB
4	2	Michaela Hrůzová	Czech Republic	2:21.386	QB
5	2	Kristen Santos	United States	2:31.067	ADVB
6	2	Sumire Kikuchi	Japan	No time	ADVB
	2	Petra Jászapáti	Hungary		PEN
1	3	Choi Min-jeong	South Korea	2:16.831	QA, OR
2	3	Han Yutong	China	2:17.112	QA
3	3	Xandra Velzeboer	Netherlands	2:18.303	QA
4	3	Courtney Sarault	Canada	2:18.316	QB
5	3	Rianne de Vries	Netherlands	2:18.712	
6	3	Zhang Yuting	China	2:18.741	
7	3	Anna Vostrikova	ROC	2:20.705	
8	3	Julie Letai	United States	2:23.315	

=== Finals ===
==== Final B ====
Rank	Name	Country	Time	Notes
8	Sumire Kikuchi	Japan	2:37.915	
9	Kristen Santos	United States	2:45.492	
10	Kim Boutin	Canada	2:45.568	
11	Courtney Sarault	Canada	2:45.606	
12	Cynthia Mascitto	Italy	2:45.697	
13	Kim A-lang	South Korea	2:45.707	
14	Michaela Hrůzová	Czech Republic	2:46.664	

==== Final A ====
Rank	Name	Country	Time	Notes
1st place, gold medalist(s)	Choi Min-jeong	South Korea	2:17.789	
2nd place, silver medalist(s)	Arianna Fontana	Italy	2:17.862	
3rd place, bronze medalist(s)	Suzanne Schulting	Netherlands	2:17.865	
4	Hanne Desmet	Belgium	2:18.711	
5	Xandra Velzeboer	Netherlands	2:18.781	
6	Lee Yu-bin	South Korea	2:18.825	
7	Han Yutong	China	2:19.060	
