= Uliana Dubrova =

Ukrainian speed skater

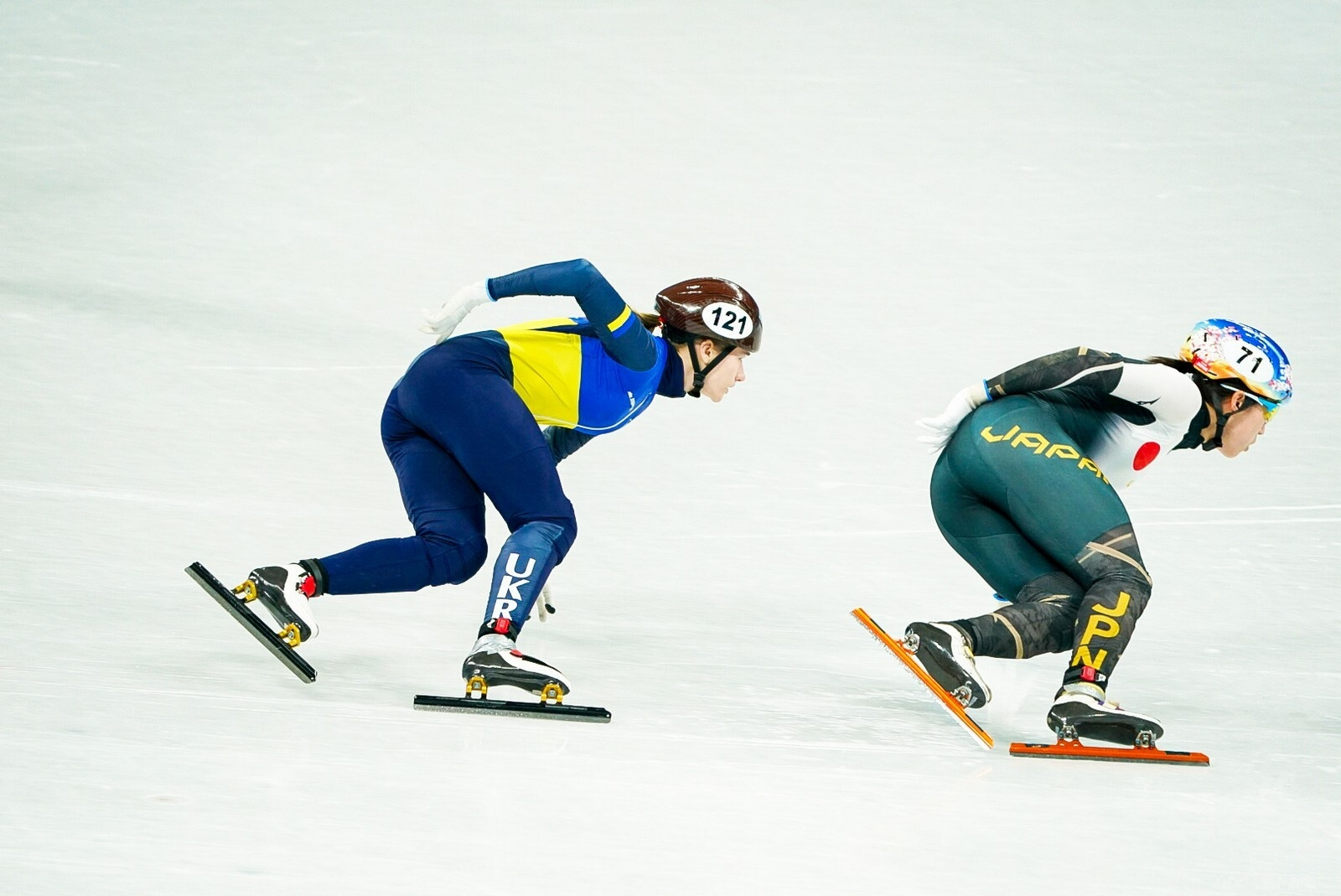
- Dubrova (left) at the 2022 Winter Olympics

Personal information
- Full name: Дуброва Уляна Валеріївна
- Nationality: Ukrainian
- Born: 3 April 2002 (age 23); Kharkiv, Ukraine

Sport
- Sport: Short track speed skating

Uliana Dubrova (born 3 April 2002, in Kharkiv, Ukraine) is a Ukrainian short track speed skater. She competed in the 1500 metres event at the 2022 Winter Olympics where she did not advance from the heat.

== Sporting career ==
Dubrova took up the sport in 2012. She started her international senior sporting career in late 2019 when she debuted at the World Cup. One year before that, she debuted at the World Junior Championships.

Uliana Dubrova managed to qualify for her first Winter Games in Beijing based on the performances during the 2021–22 World Cup. She finished last in her heats race.

== Results ==
=== Winter Olympics ===
Year	Host	500 m	1000 m	1500 m	Relay	Mixed relay
2022	Beijing, China	—	—	32	—	—

=== European Championships ===
Year	Host	500 m	1000 m	1500 m	Allround	Relay
2020	Debrecen, Hungary	—	—	—	—	11
2021	Gdańsk, Poland	—	—	—	—	9
