= Jakub Nosek =

Czech bobsledder

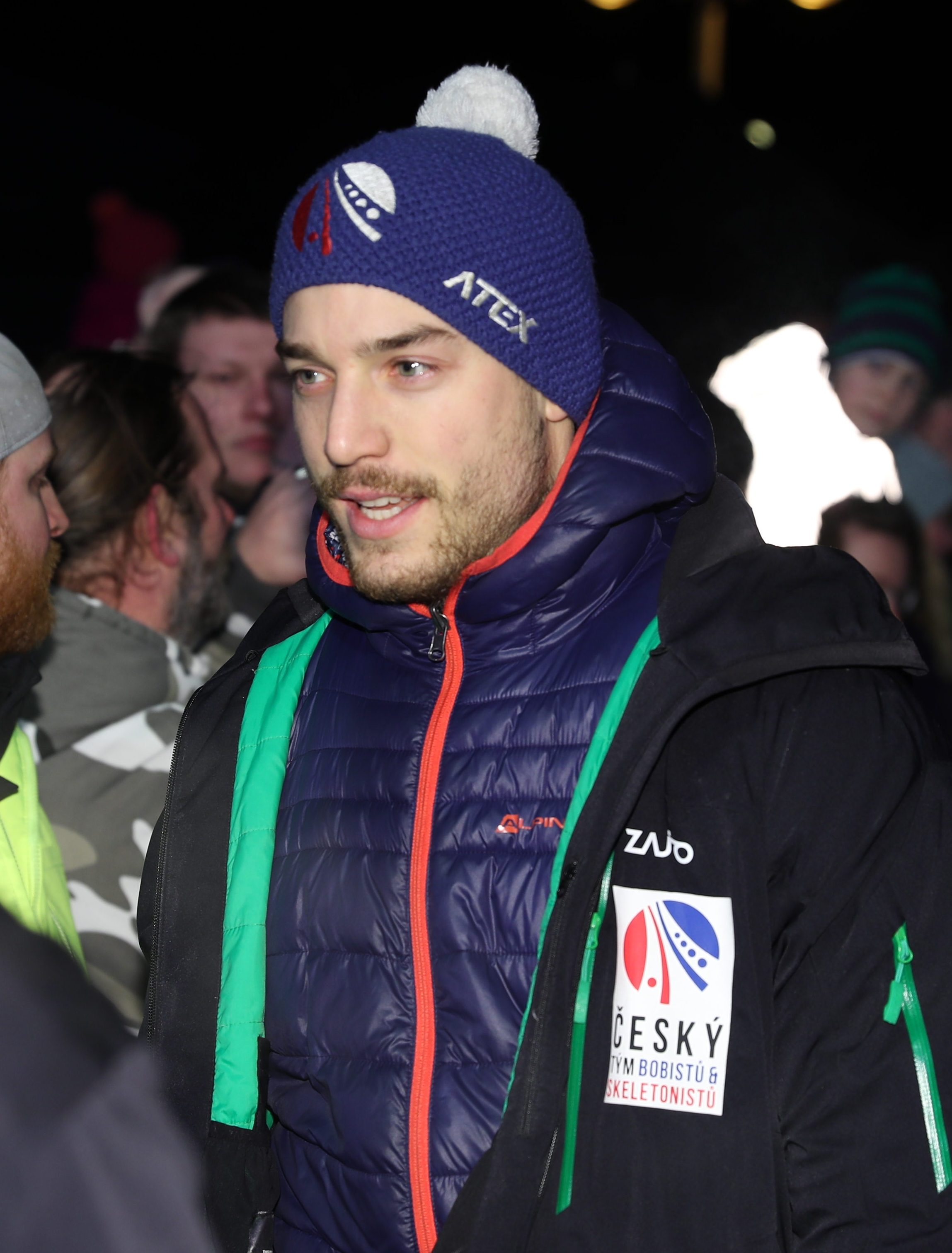
- Jakub Nosek in 2020

Personal information
- Nationality: Czech
- Born: 30 October 1989 (age 36) Ústí nad Labem, Czechoslovakia
- Education: Charles University
- Height: 190 cm (6 ft 3 in)
- Weight: 102 kg (225 lb)

Sport
- Country: Czech Republic
- Sport: Bobsleigh

Jakub Nosek (born 30 October 1989) is a Czech deaf bobsledder. He formerly competed as a track and field athlete.

== Early life ==
Nosek was born in Ústí nad Labem, but grew up in Náchod. He became deaf after contracting meningitis at only three years old, having lost about 99 percent of the hearing in his right ear and 85 percent in his left ear.

Nosek has been involved in sports since childhood and played football until the age of 12. He became interested in bobsleigh when Radek Matoušek scouted him to try the sport. Nosek initially opposed as he wanted to finish school first, but later accepted Matousek's decision.

== Career ==
Nosek competed in Deaflympics as a track-and-field athlete, representing the Czech Republic in 2009, 2013, and 2017.

Nosek made his Winter Olympic Games debut during the two-man bobsleigh event at the 2018 Winter Olympics, where he finished 17th place with Dominik Dvořák. At the 2018–19 Bobsleigh World Cup, the pair took eleventh place in Calgary and finished fourth in the final overall standings.

At the 2019–20 Bobsleigh World Cup in Lake Placid, Nosek teamed up with Dominik Suchý, Dvořák, Jan Šindelář – finishing seventh place in the final standings of the four-man bobsleigh. They also finished tenth place during IBSF World Championships 2020.

After Suchý withdrew from the 2022 Winter Olympics due to an injury, it was confirmed that Nosek, Dvořák, and Šindelář would remain part of the Czech bobsleigh team. They were joined by newcomers Dominik Záleský and Jáchym Procházka. During the tournament, Nosek teamed up with Dvořák in the two-man bobsleigh category, finishing 12th place.

== Personal life ==
Nosek has a daughter named Viktorie with his partner Aneta.

== See also ==
- Deaf people in the Olympics
