= Dominik Suchý =

Czech bobsledder

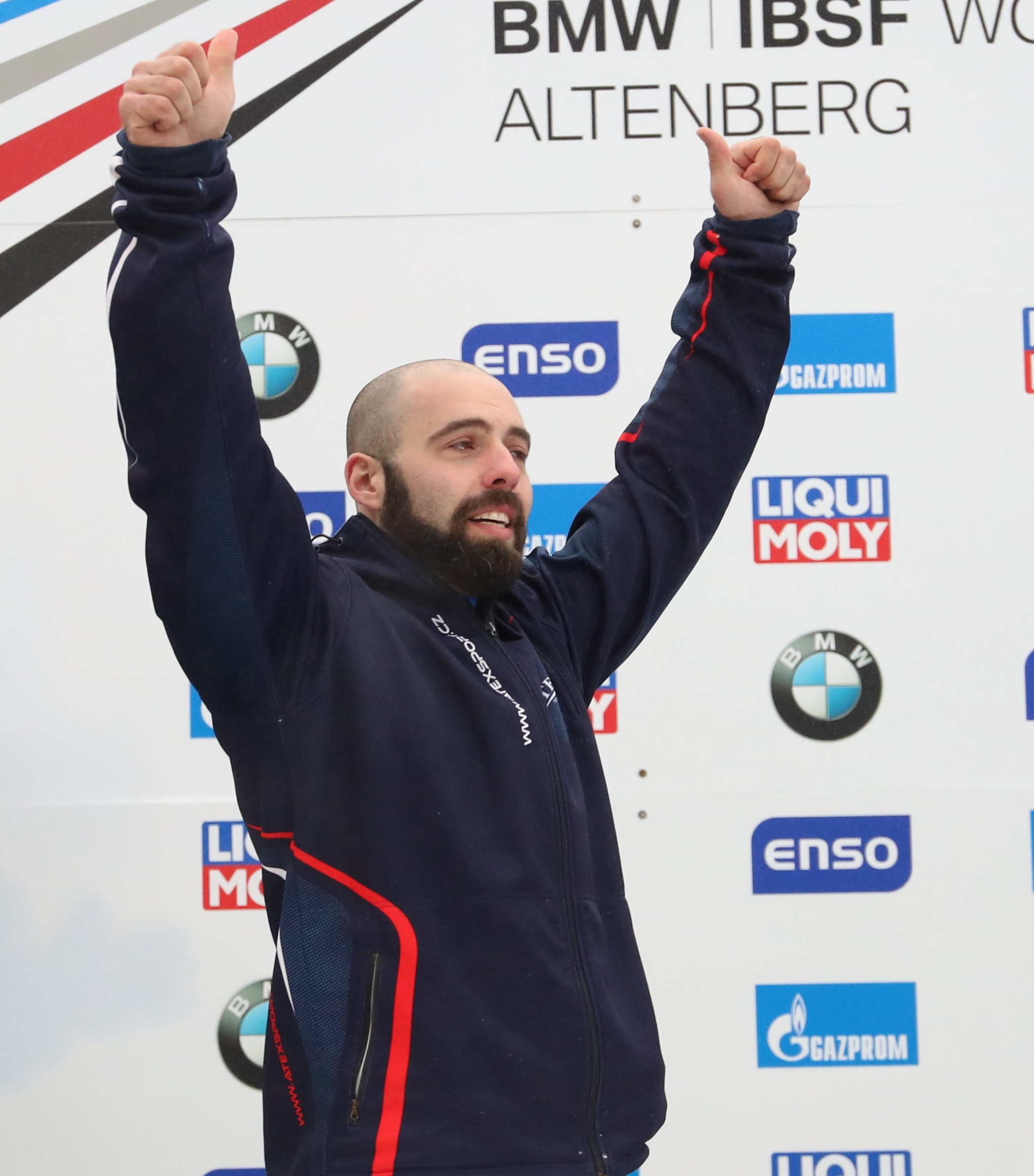
- Suchý in 2019

Personal information
- Nationality: Czech
- Born: 13 November 1987 (age 38) Plzeň, Czechoslovakia
- Height: 185 cm (6 ft 1 in)
- Weight: 105 kg (231 lb)

Sport
- Country: Czech Republic
- Sport: Bobsleigh
- Retired: 2022

Dominik Suchý (born 13 November 1987) is a Czech former bobsledder. He represented his country at the 2010, 2014, and 2018 Winter Olympics.

== Early life ==
Suchý was introduced to bobsleigh by his parents. He cites the film Cool Runnings as his inspiration to be a bobsledder and initially wanted to be military pilot, but did not have time to complete pilot tests.

== Career ==
=== Early Winter Olympics career ===
Suchý finished 12th place at the 2010 Winter Olympics in the four-man bobsleigh category with Ivo Danilevič, Jan Kobián, and Jan Stokláska.

At the 2014 Winter Olympics, he finished 16th place in the four-man bobsleigh team with Dominik Dvořák, Jan Vrba, and Michal Vacek.

At the 2015–16 Bobsleigh World Cup in Altenberg, Suchý partnered with Vrba during the two-man bobsleigh event. However, due to difficult weather conditions, they did not advance to the next race among the top 20. In the same city, they also teamed up with Jan Stokláska and Jakub Havlín for the four-man bobsleigh event. The quartet finished 15th place, only to lose against the German bobsleigh team.

On 26 January 2019, at the 2018–19 Bobsleigh World Cup in St. Moritz, Switzerland, Suchý partnered with Dvořák in the two-man bobsleigh, finishing tenth place.

=== Bobsleigh World Cups and exclusion from the 2022 Winter Olympics ===
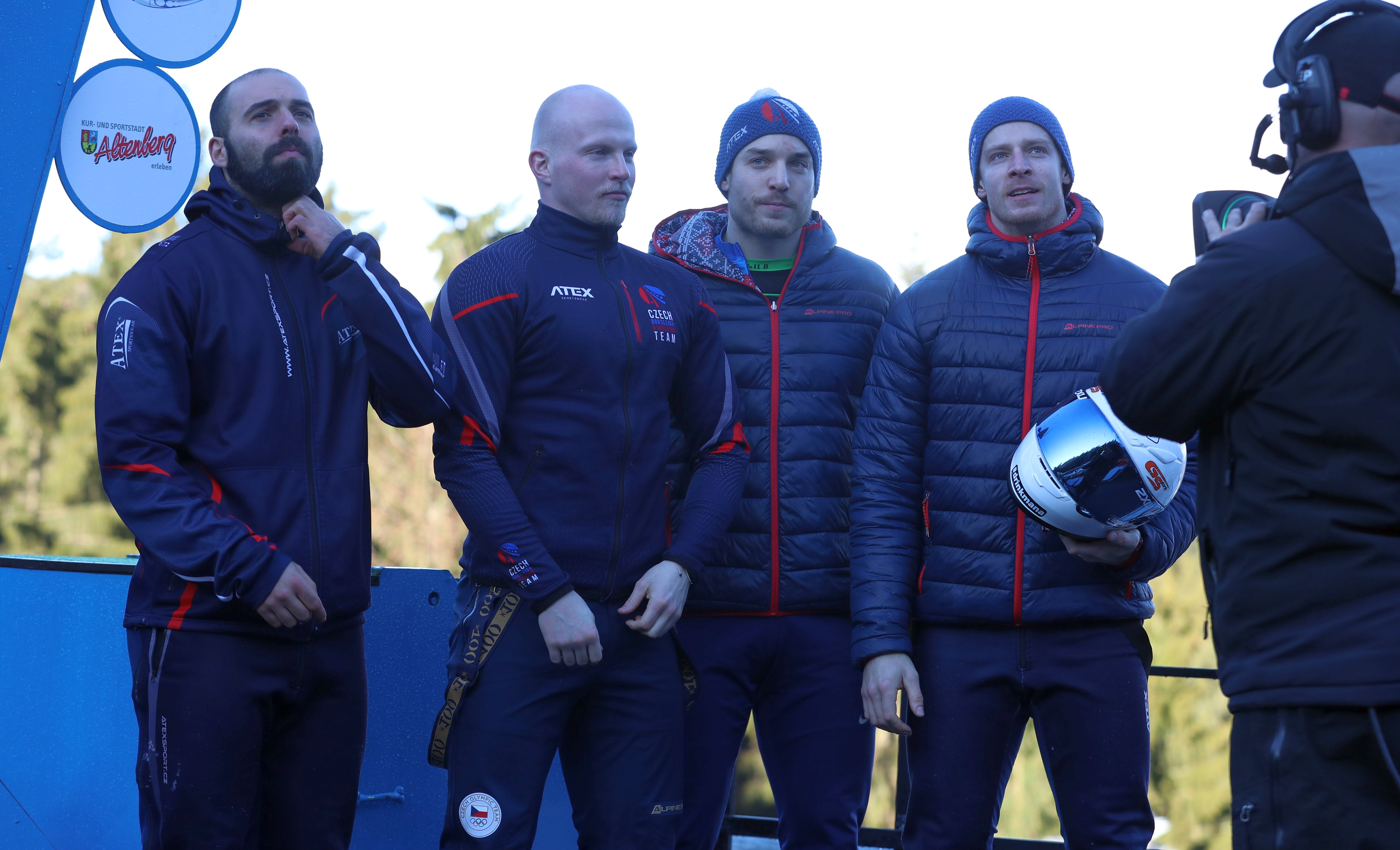
Suchý (left) during the medal ceremony at IBSF World Championships 2020

At the 2019–20 Bobsleigh World Cup in Lake Placid, Suchý teamed up with Dvořák, Jan Šindelář, and Nosek – finishing seventh place in the final standings of the four-man bobsleigh. In Königssee, Suchý partnered with Dvořák partnered in the two-man bobsleigh category, finishing tenth place. Said four-man bobsleigh also finished tenth place during IBSF World Championships 2020.

At the 2020–21 Bobsleigh World Cup, Suchý and Dvořák partnered again for the two-man bobsleigh event in Sigulda, Latvia. They made it to the top ten for their second time in a row, finishing tenth place.

Suchý was dropped out from the Czech bobsleigh team before the 2022 Winter Olympics upon suffering from an Achilles tendon injury, eventually ending his bobsleigh career.
