= Dominik Záleský =

Czech sprinter (born 1995)

Personal information
- Nationality: Czech
- Born: 23 August 1995 (age 31) Ústí nad Orlicí, Czech Republic
- Education: Palacký University
- Height: 179 cm (5 ft 10 in)
- Weight: 82 kg (181 lb)

Sport
- Sport: Athletics and Bobsleigh
- Events: 100 metres and 4-man
- Coached by: Jan Veleba

Dominik Záleský (born 23 August 1995) is a Czech sprinter and bobsledder.

== Early life ==
Záleský's dream of participating in the Olympics stems from his childhood, in which he watched Nagano on VHS at his grandfather's place.

== Career ==
Following the retirement of Jan Šindelář and Jakub Nosek after the 2022 Winter Olympics, Záleský was announced to be part of the Czech four-man bobsleigh crew alongside Dominik Dvořák, David Bureš, and Jáchym Procházka.

On 9 December 2023, Dvořák and Záleský partnered during the two-man bobsleigh event at the 2023–24 Bobsleigh World Cup. They also teamed up with Michal Dobeš and David Bureš in the four-man category. All of them finished 14th place in both event categories.

== International competitions ==
Year	Competition	Venue	Position	Event	Notes
Representing the Czech Republic
2017	European U23 Championships	Bydgoszcz, Poland	9th (sf)	100 m	10.39
2017	European U23 Championships	Bydgoszcz, Poland	–	4 × 100 m relay	DQ
2017	Universiade	Taipei, Taiwan	30th (qf)	100 m	12.18
2018	World Indoor Championships	Birmingham, United Kingdom	17th (sf)	60 m	6.67
2018	European Championships	Berlin, Germany	31st (h)	100 m	10.55
2018	European Championships	Berlin, Germany	6th (h)	4 × 100 m relay	38.94^{1}
2019	World Relays	Yokohama, Japan	12th (h)	4 × 100 m relay	38.77
2019	Universiade	Naples, Italy	6th	100 m	10.42
2019	Universiade	Naples, Italy	6th	4 × 100 m relay	40.54

^{1}Did not start in the final

== Records ==
Outdoor

- 100 metres – 10.16 NR (+1.0 m/s, Zlín 2021)
- 200 metres – 20.94 (+1.0 m/s, Ostrava 2021)

Indoor

- 60 metres – 6.61 (Prague 2018)
