= Jan Šindelář =

Czech bobsledder

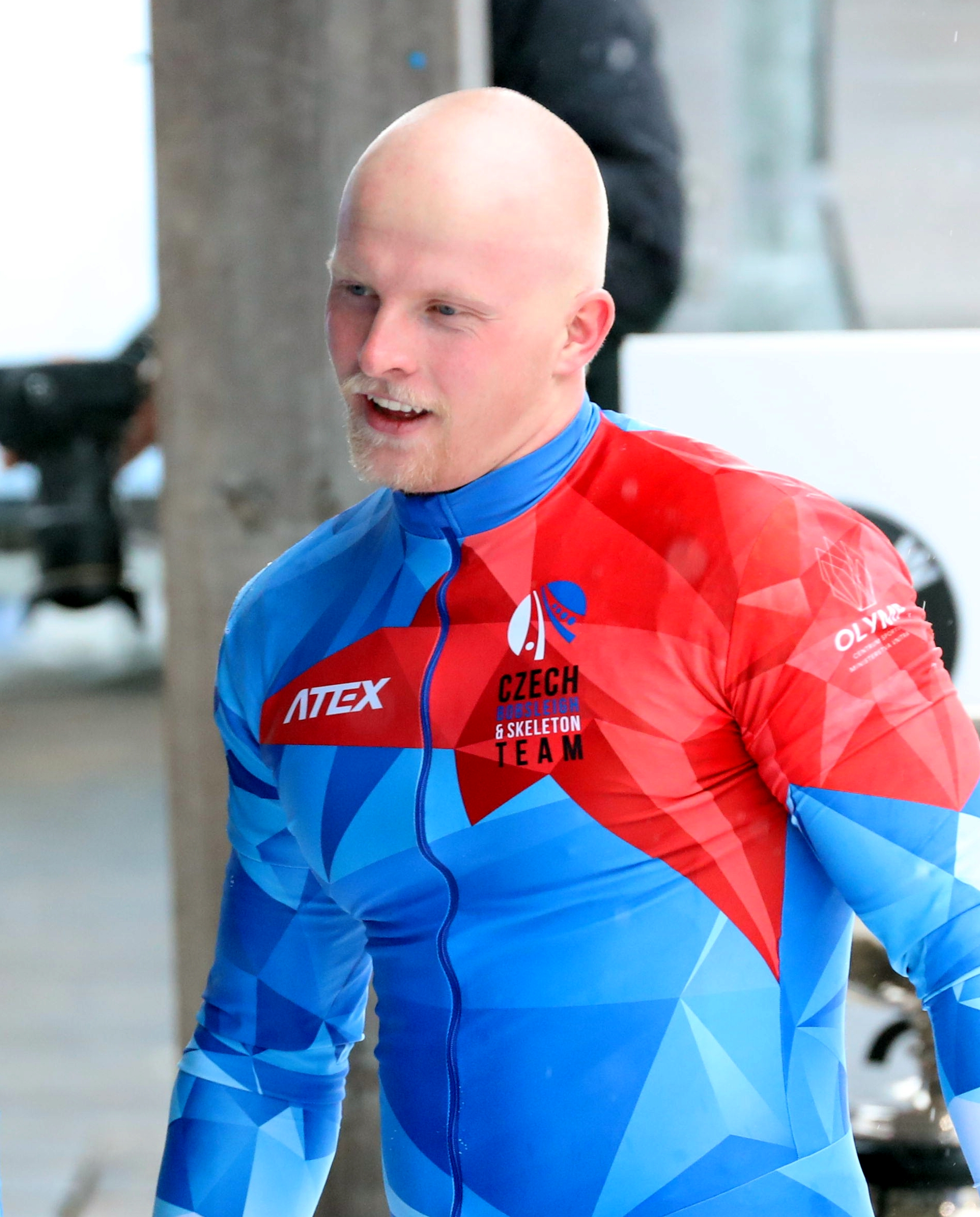
- Šindelář in 2020

Personal information
- Nationality: Czech
- Born: 3 November 1993 (age 32) Nymburk, Czech Republic
- Height: 186 cm (6 ft 1 in)
- Weight: 96 kg (212 lb)

Sport
- Sport: Bobsleigh

Jan Šindelář (born 3 November 1993) is a Czech bobsledder. He competed at the 2018 and 2022 Winter Olympics.

== Career ==
Šindelář was first named as one of the participants for the Czech Republic at the 2018 Winter Olympics, where he also got his first tattoo.

At the 2019–20 Bobsleigh World Cup in Königssee, Šindelář teamed up with Dominik Suchý, Dominik Dvořák, and Jakub Nosek – finishing seventh place in the final standings of the four-man bobsleigh. They also finished tenth place during IBSF World Championships 2020.

After Suchý withdrew from the 2022 Winter Olympics due to an injury, it was confirmed that Šindelář would remain in the Czech bobsleigh team with Dvořák and Nosek, along with newcomers Dominik Záleský and Jáchym Procházka.

== Personal life ==
Šindelář names Lindsey Vonn and Mikaela Shiffrin as his close friends.
