= Dominik Dvořák =

Czech bobsledder

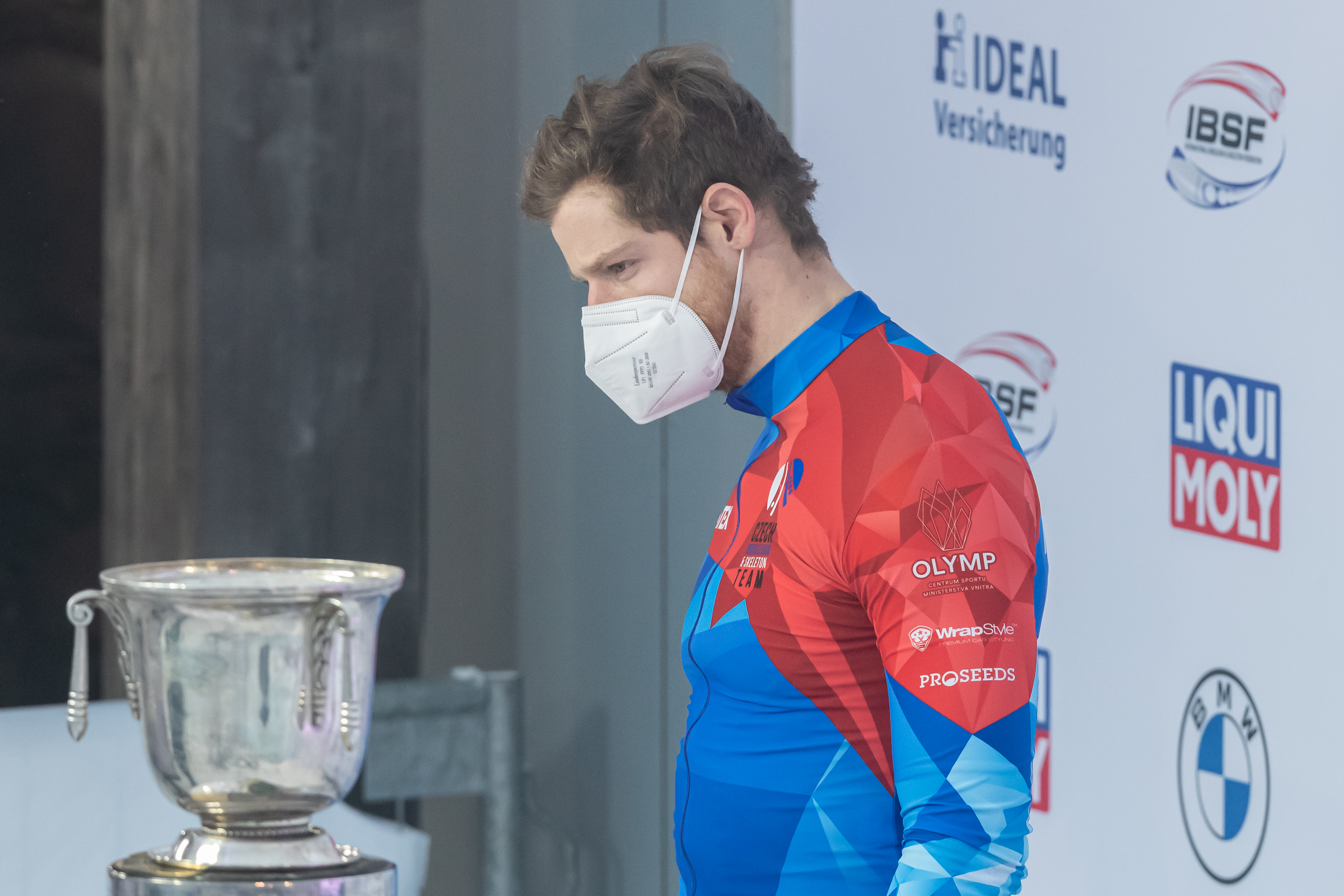
- Dvořák in 2021

Personal information
- Nationality: Czech
- Born: 9 June 1992 (age 33) Prague, Czechoslovakia
- Height: 191 cm (6 ft 3 in)
- Weight: 98 kg (216 lb)

Sport
- Country: Czech Republic
- Sport: Bobsleigh
- Retired: 2024

Dominik Dvořák (born 9 June 1992) is a Czech former bobsledder.

== Early life ==
Dvořák developed an interest in bobsleigh when he was five years old. Whilst training in a hall in Strahov, Prague, president of Czech bobsleigh association asked him to try bobsleigh, to which he accepted.

== Career ==
=== 2010s ===
Dvořák finished 16th place at the 2014 Winter Olympics, where he teamed up in the four-man bobsleigh category with Dominik Suchý, Jan Vrba, and Michal Vacek.

At the 2018 Winter Olympics, Dvořák teamed up with Jakub Nosek in the two-man bobsleigh category, finishing 17th place. The pair also finished eleventh place at the 2018–19.

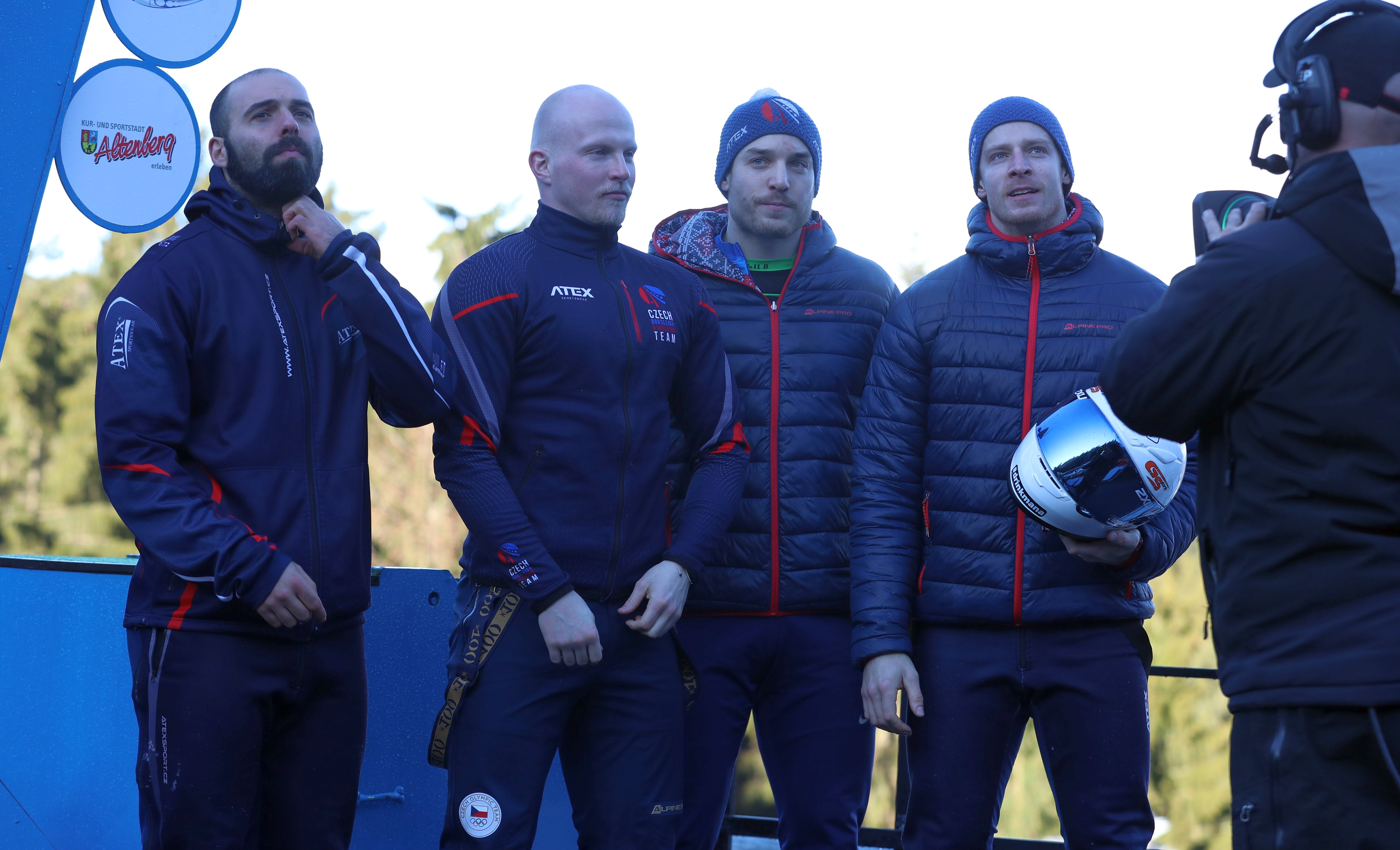
Dvořák (second from right) at the IBSF World Championships 2020

At the 2019–20 Bobsleigh World Cup in Königssee, Dvořák teamed up with Suchý, Jan Šindelář, and Nosek – finishing seventh place in the final standings of the four-man bobsleigh. In Königssee, Dvořák partnered with Suchý in the two-man bobsleigh category, finishing tenth place. Said four-man bobsleigh also finished tenth place during IBSF World Championships 2020.

=== 2020–2022: Bobsleigh World Cup and 2022 Winter Olympics ===
At the 2020–21 Bobsleigh World Cup, Dvořák and Suchý partnered again for the two-man bobsleigh event in Sigulda, Latvia. They made it to the top ten for their second time in a row, finishing tenth place.

After Suchý withdrew from the 2022 Winter Olympics due to an injury, it was confirmed that Dvořák would join Šindelář and Nosek, along with newcomers Dominik Záleský and Jáchym Procházka. During the tournament, Dvořák teamed up with Nosek in the two-man bobsleigh category, finishing 12th place.

=== 2023–2024: New bobsleigh crew and retirement ===
Following Šindelář and Nosek's retirement from the 2022 Winter Olympics, it was confirmed that Dvořák's fellow bobsleigh crew would consist of Záleský, David Bureš, and Jáchym Procházka.

During the IBSF European Championships 2023, Dvořák partnered with Procházka in the two-man event, finishing eleventh place. However, on 24 January 2023, Dvořák suffered a left knee injury that led him to miss the rest of the season. He was replaced by Matěj Běhounek.

Dvořák returned on 9 December 2023, where he partnered with Záleský during the two-man bobsleigh event at the 2023–24 Bobsleigh World Cup. They also teamed up with Michal Dobeš and David Bureš in the four-man category. All of them finished 14th place in both event categories.

On 9 January 2024, Dvořák announced his retirement from bobsleigh at the age of 31, citing health reasons.

== Personal life ==
Dvořák is bilingual in Czech and English. He is in relationship with Adéla Vašutová, a professional volleyball player. Dvořák enjoys watching hockey and ice skating, the latter of which has been his interest since childhood.
