= Vojtěch Mozík =

Czech ice hockey player

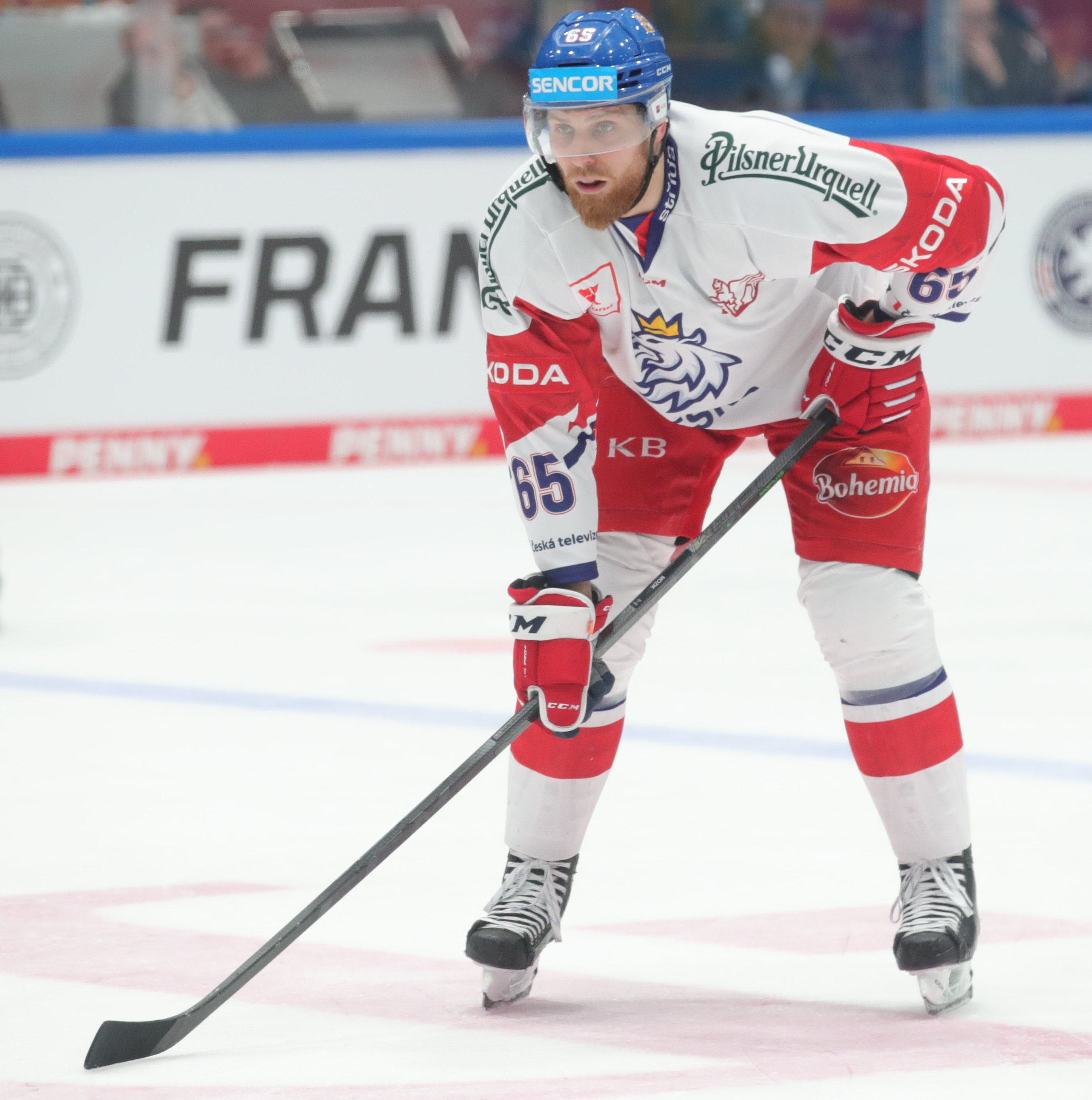
- Mozík with the Czech Republic in 2023
- Born: 26 December 1992 (age 33) Prague, Czechoslovakia
- Height: 6 ft 2 in (188 cm)
- Weight: 196 lb (89 kg; 14 st 0 lb)
- Position: Defence
- Shoots: Right
- SHL team Former teams: Rögle BK; BK Mladá Boleslav; HC Plzeň; New Jersey Devils; HC Vityaz; Färjestad BK; Kunlun Red Star; Admiral Vladivostok
- National team: Czech Republic
- NHL draft: Undrafted
- Playing career: 2011–present

Vojtěch Mozík (born 26 December 1992) is a Czech professional ice hockey defenceman. He is currently under contract with Rögle BK of the Swedish Hockey League (SHL).

== Playing career ==
Undrafted, Mozík played professionally in his native county with BK Mladá Boleslav and HC Plzeň in the Czech Extraliga. On 15 June 2015, Mozík was signed to a two-year entry-level contract with the New Jersey Devils. Mozík made his NHL debut in the following 2015–16 season, playing in 7 scoreless games with the Devils.

After the 2016–17 season, having spent two seasons within the Devils organization primarily assigned to American Hockey League affiliate, the Albany Devils, Mozík left as an impending restricted free agent in agreeing to a one-year contract with Russian club, HC Vityaz of the KHL, on 3 May 2017.

On 2 July 2019, having left the KHL as a free agent, Mozík agreed to a two-year contract with Swedish club, Färjestad BK of the Swedish Hockey League (SHL).

In the final year of his contract with Färjestad BK in the 2020–21 season, Mozík collected just one assist through 16 regular season games before he was released from his contract. On 18 December 2020, Mozík returned to the KHL, securing a one-year contract with HC Kunlun Red Star for the remainder of the season.

In the following 2021–22 season, Mozík continued in the KHL, signing with Admiral Vladivostok and posting three goals and 14 points through 49 regular season games. With Admiral finishing out of contention for the playoffs, Mozík left the club and signed for the remainder of the season in the SHL with Rögle BK on 14 February 2022.

== Career statistics ==
=== Regular season and playoffs ===
			Regular season					Playoffs
Season	Team	League	GP	G	A	Pts	PIM	GP	G	A	Pts	PIM
2007–08	BK Mladá Boleslav	CZE U18	26	0	1	1	4	2	0	0	0	0
2008–09	BK Mladá Boleslav	CZE U18	46	5	10	15	28	2	0	0	0	2
2009–10	BK Mladá Boleslav	CZE U18	50	9	23	32	83	2	0	0	0	14
2009–10	BK Mladá Boleslav	CZE U20	3	0	1	1	2	—	—	—	—	—
2010–11	BK Mladá Boleslav	CZE U20	52	3	12	15	48	—	—	—	—	—
2011–12	BK Mladá Boleslav	CZE U20	11	0	3	3	14	—	—	—	—	—
2011–12	BK Mladá Boleslav	ELH	27	2	3	5	12	—	—	—	—	—
2012–13	BK Mladá Boleslav	Czech.1	5	0	0	0	2	—	—	—	—	—
2012–13	HC Škoda Plzeň	ELH	28	0	1	1	20	18	0	1	1	24
2013–14	HC Škoda Plzeň	ELH	51	8	6	14	60	6	0	1	1	2
2014–15	HC Škoda Plzeň	ELH	51	10	19	29	94	4	1	1	2	6
2015–16	Albany Devils	AHL	53	2	15	17	40	11	0	2	2	7
2015–16	New Jersey Devils	NHL	7	0	0	0	4	—	—	—	—	—
2016–17	Albany Devils	AHL	65	11	11	22	56	4	0	0	0	0
2017–18	HC Vityaz	KHL	55	9	21	30	46	—	—	—	—	—
2018–19	HC Vityaz	KHL	57	5	20	25	67	4	0	0	0	2
2019–20	Färjestad BK	SHL	50	2	13	15	36	—	—	—	—	—
2020–21	Färjestad BK	SHL	16	0	1	1	16	—	—	—	—	—
2020–21	Kunlun Red Star	KHL	23	4	6	10	26	—	—	—	—	—
2021–22	Admiral Vladivostok	KHL	49	3	11	14	30	—	—	—	—	—
ELH totals			157	20	29	49	186	28	1	3	4	32
NHL totals			7	0	0	0	4	—	—	—	—	—
KHL totals			184	21	58	79	169	4	0	0	0	2

=== International ===
Year	Team	Event	Result	GP	G	A	Pts	PIM
2012	Czech Republic	WJC	5th	6	1	2	3	8
2018	Czech Republic	OG	4th	6	0	2	2	6
2022	Czech Republic	OG	9th	4	0	0	0	0
Junior totals				6	1	2	3	8
Senior totals				10	0	2	2	6
