= Lukáš Daněk =

Czech Nordic combined skier (born 1997)

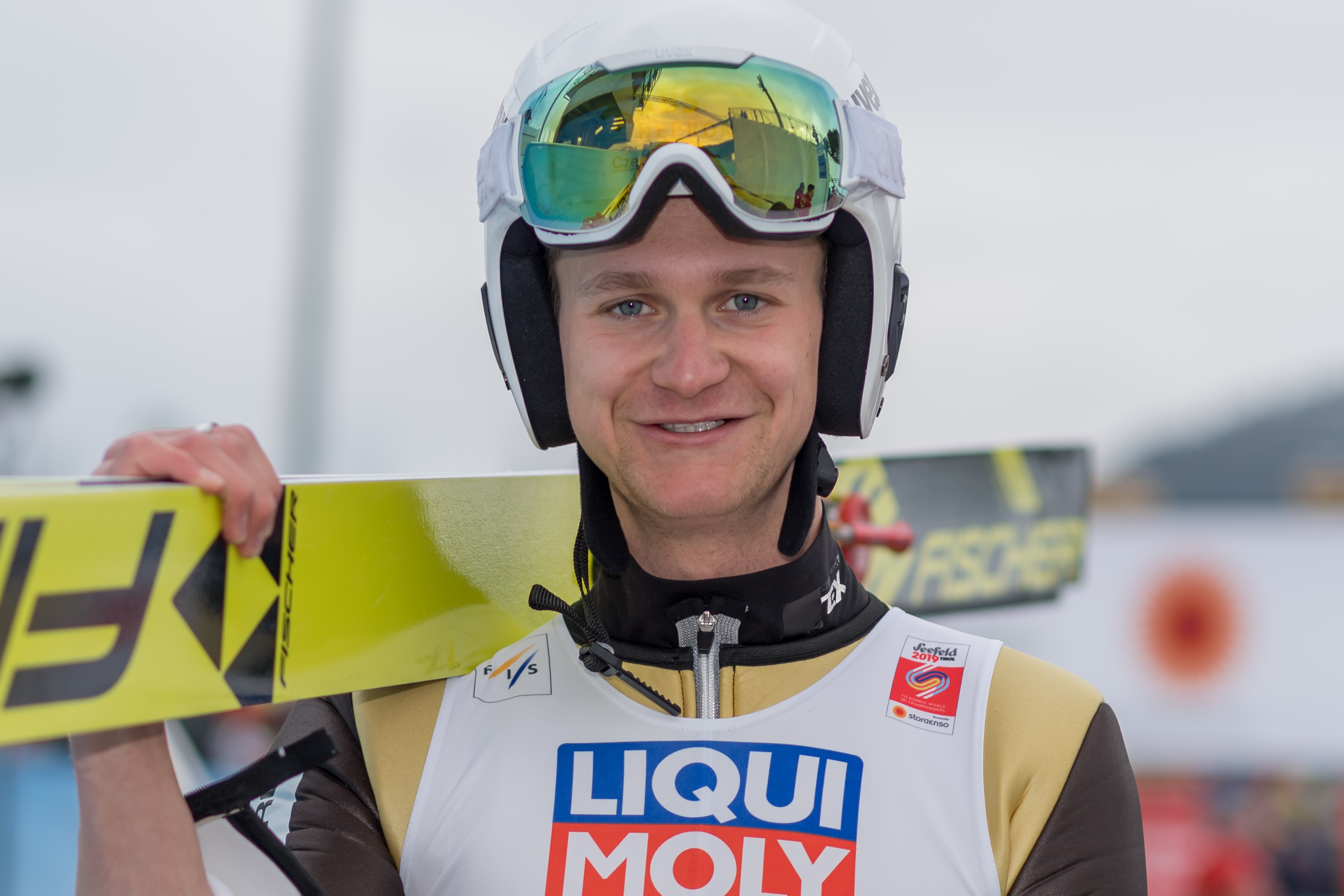
- Daněk in 2019

Personal information
- Nationality: Czech
- Born: 19 September 1997 (age 27); Jilemnice, Czech Republic

Sport
- Sport: Nordic combined

Lukáš Daněk (born 19 September 1997) is a Czech Nordic combined skier. He competed in the 2018 Winter Olympics and the 2022 Winter Olympics.
