= Michaela Hrůzová =

Czech short track speed skater

Personal information
- Birth name: Michaela Sejpalová
- Nationality: Czech
- Born: 6 February 1998 (age 27); Prague, Czech Republic
- Height: 1.67 m (5 ft 6 in)
- Weight: 56 kg (123 lb)

Sport
- Country: Czech Republic
- Sport: Short track speed skating

Michaela Hrůzová (née Sejpalová; born 6 February 1998) is a Czech short track speed skater. She competed in the 2018 Winter Olympics. She competed at the 2022 Winter Olympics.
