= Nordic combined at the 2018 Winter Olympics – Qualification =

== Qualification ==
A total of 55 quota spots are available to athletes to compete at the games. A maximum of 5 athletes can be entered by a National Olympic Committee. Competitors are eligible to compete if they have scored points at a World or Continental cup event during the qualification period of July 2016 to 21 January 2018. The top 50 on the Olympic quota allocation list respecting the maximum of 5 per country will qualify to compete, including the host. The host will be allowed to enter one competitor in each competition including the relay provided the athletes are on the allocation list. Following the top 50, quota spots will be given to nations competing in the relay competition who do not have the required four entrants yet to bring the number of relay teams up to ten. If at that point, the maximum has not been achieved the highest ranking athletes from unrepresented nations will be chosen.

== Quota allocation ==
Allocation as of 4 February 2018 (includes the 2016–17 season and the 2017-18 season up to 21 January).

=== Summary ===
Nations	Athletes	Team
Austria	**5**	X
Czech Republic	**4**	X
Estonia	**2**	
Finland	**5**	X
France	**5**	X
Germany	**5**	X
Italy	**4**	X
Japan	**5**	X
Norway	**5**	X
Poland	**4**	X
Olympic Athletes from Russia	~~2~~ **1**	
Slovenia	~~3~~ **2**	
South Korea	**1**	
Switzerland	**1**	
Ukraine	**1**	
United States	**5**	X
Total: 16 NOCs	55	10

- The Czech Republic and Poland have one allocation added for the team event.
- The FIS lists USA as having five entries, but only four entries (and 54 total) are present on the official Olympic listing.

=== Next eligible NOC ===
Two quotas were rejected and made available for reallocation. Bold indicates the acceptance of a quota.

Men's
**United States**
~~Italy~~
**United States**
~~Olympic Athletes from Russia~~
Czech Republic
Estonia
~~Olympic Athletes from Russia~~
Ukraine
~~Slovenia~~
~~Olympic Athletes from Russia~~
