= Snowboarding at the 2018 Winter Olympics – Qualification =

Qualification rules for snowboarding events at the 2018 Winter Olympics

The following is about the qualification rules and the quota allocation for the snowboarding events at the 2018 Winter Olympics.

== Qualification standard ==
An athlete must have placed in the top 30 at a World Cup event after July 2016 or at the 2017 World Championships in that respective event and also have a maximum number of FIS points (100 for giant slalom and snowboard cross, 50 for the other three).

A total of 258 quota spots are available to athletes to compete at the games. A maximum of 26 athletes can be entered by a National Olympic Committee, with a maximum of 14 men or 14 women.

== Allocation of quotas ==
At the end of the qualification period of 22 January 2018 quotas will be awarded using the Olympic Quota Allocation List (which includes all results of the World Cups from July 2016 and the results of the 2017 World Championship). The spots will be awarded to each country per athlete appearing on the list starting at number one per event until a maximum for each event is reached. Once an NOC has reached the maximum of 4 quota spots in an event, it will no longer be counted for the allocation of quotas. If a nation goes over the total of 14 per sex or 26 total it is up to that nation to select its team to meet the rules by January 24, 2018. Any vacated spots will be then awarded in that event starting from the first athlete not to be awarded a quota.

Current summary (as of 9 February 2018)

NOC	Men				Women				Total
NOC	Parallel	Halfpipe	Snowboardcross	Slopestyle/Big air	Parallel	Halfpipe	Snowboardcross	Slopestyle/Big air	Total
Andorra			1						1
Argentina			1	1					2
Australia		3	4			2	1	2	12
Austria	4		4	1	4			1	14
Belgium				3					3
Brazil							1		1
Bulgaria	1				1		1		3
Canada	2	1	4	4	~~1~~ 0	3	4	3	21
China		2			3	4			9
Czech Republic			1	1	1		3	2	8
Finland		3	1	4				1	9
France	1		4			3	4	1	13
Germany	3	1	3		4		1	1	13
Great Britain				3			1	~~2~~ 1	5
Ireland		1							1
Italy	4		4	1	1		4		14
Japan	~~2~~ 1	4	~~1~~	2	~~3~~ 1	4		4	16
Netherlands			~~1~~	1	1			1	3
New Zealand		1	1	2				1	5
Norway			~~1~~	4				1	5
Poland	1		1		3		1		6
Olympic Athletes from Russia	4	1	2	2	4		~~3~~ 2	1	16
Slovakia								1	1
Slovenia	3	2			1	1			7
South Korea	3	3		1	2	1		1	11
Spain			3			1			4
Sweden				~~3~~ 2					2
Switzerland	3	4	2	4	4	1	3	4	25
Ukraine					1				1
United States	2	4	4	4		4	4	4	26
Total: 30 NOCs	32	30	40	40	31	24	30	30	257

=== Next eligible NOC per event ===
The following list shows the next ten (or less) in the allocation lists. If a country rejects a quota spot then additional quotas become available. A country can be eligible for more than one quota spot per event in the reallocation process. The numbers in brackets indicate the number of quotas to be reallocated, a strike through indicates no interest, and bolding indicates acceptance of the quota.

Men

Parallel (1 confirmed)	Halfpipe	Snowboard Cross (3 confirmed)	Slopestyle/Big Air (1 confirmed)
~~Slovenia~~; Poland; Canada; China; Germany; United States; Switzerland; Switzerland; Poland; South Korea	New Zealand; Canada; Germany; Olympic Athletes from Russia; China; Italy; South Korea; South Korea; France; Canada	~~Switzerland~~; Argentina; Spain; ~~Netherlands~~; Canada; Germany; Olympic Athletes from Russia; Olympic Athletes from Russia; Switzerland; Japan	~~Italy~~; Argentina; Slovenia; Great Britain; France; Austria; Austria; Italy; Germany; France

Women

Parallel (2 confirmed, 1 unused)	Halfpipe	Snowboard Cross (1 confirmed)	Slopestyle/Big Air (1 available)
China; ~~Canada~~; Bulgaria; ~~Slovenia~~; ~~Italy~~; ~~United States~~; ~~Italy~~; ~~Canada~~	Malta; Germany; Australia; South Korea; New Zealand; Canada; Poland; Switzerland; Slovenia	~~Austria~~; ~~Switzerland~~; ~~Great Britain~~; ~~Germany~~; ~~Olympic Athletes from Russia~~; Czech Republic; Andorra; ~~Austria~~	Czech Republic; Germany; New Zealand; Slovenia; Netherlands; New Zealand; Chile; Olympic Athletes from Russia; Norway; Croatia
