= Ski jumping at the 2018 Winter Olympics =

Ski jumping at the XXIII Olympic Winter Games
- Ski jumping pictogram at the 2018 Winter Olympics
- Venue: Alpensia Ski Jumping Stadium
- Dates: 8–19 February 2018
- No. of events: 4 (3 men, 1 women)
- Competitors: 100 from 21 nations

Ski jumping at the 2018 Winter Olympics took place between 8 and 19 February 2018. A total of four ski jumping events were held.

== Qualification ==
A maximum of 100 athletes (65 male and 35 female) were allowed to qualify for the ski jumping events. The quotas were allocated using the Olympic Quota Allocation List, which is calculated using the FIS World Cup standings and Continental Cup Standings from seasons 2016–17 and 2017–18 added together.

== Competition schedule ==
The following was the competition schedule for the four ski jumping events.

All times are (UTC+9).

Date	Time	Event
8 February	21:30	Men's individual normal hill qualification
10 February	21:35	Men's individual normal hill
12 February	21:50	Women's individual normal hill
16 February	21:30	Men's individual large hill qualification
17 February	21:30	Men's individual large hill
19 February	21:30	Men's team large hill

== Medal summary ==
=== Medal table ===
Rank	Nation	Gold	Silver	Bronze	Total
1	Norway	2	1	2	5
2	Germany	1	3	0	4
3	Poland	1	0	1	2
4	Japan	0	0	1	1
Totals (4 entries)		4	4	4	12

=== Events ===
Event	Gold		Silver		Bronze	
Normal hill individual	Andreas Wellinger; Germany	259.1	Johann André Forfang; Norway	250.9	Robert Johansson; Norway	249.7
Large hill individual	Kamil Stoch; Poland	285.7	Andreas Wellinger; Germany	282.3	Robert Johansson; Norway	275.3
Large hill team	Norway; Daniel-André Tande; Andreas Stjernen; Johann André Forfang; Robert Johansson	1098.5	Germany; Karl Geiger; Stephan Leyhe; Richard Freitag; Andreas Wellinger	1075.7	Poland; Maciej Kot; Stefan Hula; Dawid Kubacki; Kamil Stoch	1072.4
Women's	Maren Lundby; Norway	264.6	Katharina Althaus; Germany	252.6	Sara Takanashi; Japan	243.8

== Participating nations ==
A total of 100 athletes from 21 nations (including the IOC's designation of Olympic Athletes from Russia) were scheduled to participate.

- Austria (8 athletes)
- Bulgaria (1)
- Canada (2)
- China (1)
- Czech Republic (5)
- Estonia (3)
- Finland (6)
- France (4)
- Germany (9)
- Italy (8)
- Japan (9)
- Kazakhstan (1)
- Norway (7)
- Olympic Athletes from Russia (8)
- Poland (5)
- Romania (1)
- South Korea (3)
- Slovenia (9)
- Switzerland (2)
- Turkey (1)
- United States (7)
