= Ski jumping at the 2018 Winter Olympics – Men's normal hill individual =

Men's normal hill individual at the XXIII Olympic Winter Games
- Venue: Alpensia Ski Jumping Stadium
- Dates: 8–10 February 2018
- Competitors: 57 from 19 nations
- Winning points: 259.1

Medalists
1st place, gold medalist(s)		Andreas Wellinger	Germany
2nd place, silver medalist(s)		Johann André Forfang	Norway
3rd place, bronze medalist(s)		Robert Johansson	Norway

The men's normal hill individual ski jumping competition for the 2018 Winter Olympics in Pyeongchang, South Korea, was held from 8 to 10 February 2018 at the Alpensia Ski Jumping Stadium.

== Summary ==
The field included the 2014 champion and the 2017–18 FIS Ski Jumping World Cup leader Kamil Stoch, the 2014 silver medalist Peter Prevc, the 2016–17 FIS Ski Jumping World Cup overall winner Stefan Kraft, as well as the 2010 champion Simon Ammann. After the first jump, Stefan Hula Jr. was leading, with almost six points ahead of Stoch and Johann André Forfang shared second. In the second jump, both Hula and Stoch underperformed, and Andreas Wellinger, who was in the fifth position, became the Olympic champion after receiving 134.4 points for his jump, the highest scored jump of the competition. Forfang remained second, and Robert Johansson came from the tenth place to turn the bronze medalist.

In the victory ceremony, the medals were presented by Irena Szewińska, member of the International Olympic Committee, accompanied by Alfons Hoermann, the International Ski Federation council member.

== Results ==
=== Qualifying ===
50 ski jumpers qualified for the finals.

Rank	Bib	Name	Country	Distance (m)	Distance points	Judges points	Total	Notes
1	55	Andreas Wellinger	Germany	103.0	70.0	57.0	133.5	Q
2	57	Kamil Stoch	Poland	104.0	72.0	56.0	131.7	Q
3	49	Dawid Kubacki	Poland	104.5	73.0	53.5	129.6	Q
4	56	Richard Freitag	Germany	102.0	68.0	56.0	129.1	Q
5	51	Stefan Kraft	Austria	102.5	69.0	55.5	128.6	Q
6	48	Markus Eisenbichler	Germany	102.5	69.0	54.5	127.7	Q
7	44	Karl Geiger	Germany	102.0	68.0	54.5	125.5	Q
8	54	Daniel-André Tande	Norway	100.0	64.0	54.0	123.0	Q
9	46	Stefan Hula Jr.	Poland	100.5	65.0	54.0	122.7	Q
10	42	Simon Ammann	Switzerland	102.0	68.0	52.5	122.3	Q
11	41	Maciej Kot	Poland	99.0	62.0	54.0	122.0	Q
12	22	Evgeni Klimov	Olympic Athletes from Russia	102.0	68.0	52.5	121.4	Q
13	53	Johann André Forfang	Norway	100.0	64.0	54.0	121.1	Q
14	43	Peter Prevc	Slovenia	99.0	62.0	54.5	120.2	Q
15	47	Andreas Stjernen	Norway	100.0	64.0	53.0	119.3	Q
16	45	Jernej Damjan	Slovenia	99.5	63.0	54.0	118.9	Q
17	21	Vladimir Zografski	Bulgaria	98.5	61.0	54.0	118.8	Q
18	50	Junshirō Kobayashi	Japan	101.0	66.0	50.0	118.4	Q
19	52	Robert Johansson	Norway	98.0	60.0	53.0	118.3	Q
20	37	Noriaki Kasai	Japan	98.0	60.0	54.0	117.7	Q
21	35	Ryoyu Kobayashi	Japan	98.0	60.0	52.5	115.3	Q
22	40	Tilen Bartol	Slovenia	97.0	58.0	52.5	115.1	Q
23	26	Mackenzie Boyd-Clowes	Canada	98.0	60.0	53.0	114.6	Q
24	28	Roman Koudelka	Czech Republic	97.5	59.0	52.5	114.5	Q
25	30	Kevin Bickner	United States	98.0	60.0	51.5	114.0	Q
26	39	Michael Hayböck	Austria	97.0	58.0	52.5	112.4	Q
27	38	Manuel Fettner	Austria	95.0	54.0	52.5	109.4	Q
28	31	Denis Kornilov	Olympic Athletes from Russia	94.5	53.0	51.0	107.2	Q
29	36	Timi Zajc	Slovenia	94.0	52.0	51.5	107.1	Q
30	18	Jonathan Learoyd	France	94.5	53.0	51.5	106.7	Q
31	25	Daiki Ito	Japan	93.5	51.0	50.5	106.0	Q
32	33	Gregor Schlierenzauer	Austria	91.5	47.0	51.0	104.0	Q
33	24	Alex Insam	Italy	94.0	52.0	51.0	101.9	Q
34	6	Alexey Romashov	Olympic Athletes from Russia	90.0	44.0	50.0	98.5	Q
35	14	Andreas Alamommo	Finland	90.0	44.0	51.0	98.3	Q
36	17	Sebastian Colloredo	Italy	91.0	46.0	51.0	97.9	Q
37	12	Davide Bresadola	Italy	88.0	40.0	49.5	95.8	Q
37	10	Janne Ahonen	Finland	89.0	42.0	49.5	95.8	Q
39	1	Choi Se-ou	South Korea	89.0	42.0	49.5	94.7	Q
40	9	Michael Glasder	United States	91.5	47.0	51.0	94.6	Q
41	8	Mikhail Nazarov	Olympic Athletes from Russia	88.5	41.0	47.5	93.7	Q
42	29	Antti Aalto	Finland	87.5	39.0	47.0	93.6	Q
43	34	Gregor Deschwanden	Switzerland	89.5	43.0	49.0	92.3	Q
44	20	Vincent Descombes Sevoie	France	86.5	37.0	49.5	92.1	Q
45	27	William Rhoads	United States	88.5	41.0	49.5	91.9	Q
46	16	Casey Larson	United States	88.0	40.0	48.5	90.9	Q
47	3	Viktor Polášek	Czech Republic	88.0	40.0	47.5	90.1	Q
48	5	Martti Nõmme	Estonia	87.0	38.0	48.0	88.2	Q
49	2	Federico Cecon	Italy	86.0	36.0	47.5	87.9	Q
50	23	Eetu Nousiainen	Finland	87.0	38.0	49.5	85.5	Q
51	13	Sergey Tkachenko	Kazakhstan	84.0	32.0	48.0	83.7	
52	15	Kim Hyun-ki	South Korea	84.0	32.0	46.0	83.1	
53	19	Vojtěch Štursa	Czech Republic	83.5	31.0	47.5	81.5	
54	32	Čestmír Kožíšek	Czech Republic	81.0	26.0	47.0	80.6	
55	11	Artti Aigro	Estonia	81.5	27.0	47.5	80.0	
56	7	Kevin Maltsev	Estonia	79.0	22.0	43.5	74.2	
57	4	Fatih Arda İpcioğlu	Turkey	79.0	22.0	45.5	68.2	

=== Final ===
The final was held on 10 February at 21:35.

				Round 1			Final round			Total
Rank	Bib	Name	Country	Distance (m)	Points	Rank	Distance (m)	Points	Rank	Points
1st place, gold medalist(s)	48	Andreas Wellinger	Germany	104.5	124.9	5	113.5	134.4	1	259.1
2nd place, silver medalist(s)	46	Johann André Forfang	Norway	106.0	125.9	2	109.5	125.0	4	250.9
3rd place, bronze medalist(s)	45	Robert Johansson	Norway	100.5	119.9	10	113.5	129.8	2	249.7
4	50	Kamil Stoch	Poland	106.5	125.9	2	105.5	123.4	6	249.3
5	39	Stefan Hula Jr.	Poland	111.0	131.8	1	105.5	117.0	11	248.8
6	47	Daniel-André Tande	Norway	103.5	118.7	13	111.5	123.6	5	242.3
7	28	Ryoyu Kobayashi	Japan	108.0	120.2	9	108.0	120.6	7	240.8
8	41	Markus Eisenbichler	Germany	106.0	121.6	7	106.5	118.6	9	240.2
9	49	Richard Freitag	Germany	106.0	125.5	4	102.5	114.5	13	240.0
10	37	Karl Geiger	Germany	103.5	120.3	8	105.0	116.4	12	236.7
11	35	Simon Ammann	Switzerland	105.0	119.4	11	104.5	117.2	10	236.6
12	36	Peter Prevc	Slovenia	98.5	106.2	24	113.0	128.1	3	234.3
13	44	Stefan Kraft	Austria	103.5	122.8	6	103.0	110.8	16	233.6
14	15	Vladimir Zografski	Bulgaria	101.5	106.8	23	108.5	119.7	8	226.5
15	40	Andreas Stjernen	Norway	104.0	114.5	15	103.5	111.3	15	225.8
16	33	Tilen Bartol	Slovenia	106.0	119.0	12	102.0	101.8	23	220.8
17	32	Michael Hayböck	Austria	99.5	109.2	21	103.0	110.5	17	219.7
18	24	Kevin Bickner	United States	109.0	117.2	14	98.5	100.2	24	217.4
19	34	Maciej Kot	Poland	99.0	109.6	20	102.0	107.4	18	217.0
20	19	Daiki Ito	Japan	103.0	110.3	19	102.0	104.4	20	214.7
21	30	Noriaki Kasai	Japan	104.5	113.9	16	99.0	99.4	26	213.3
22	26	Gregor Schlierenzauer	Austria	102.5	108.6	22	99.5	103.6	22	212.2
23	31	Manuel Fettner	Austria	96.5	99.5	29	105.5	112.2	14	211.7
24	25	Denis Kornilov	Olympic Athletes from Russia	107.5	113.9	16	96.5	95.7	28	209.6
25	22	Roman Koudelka	Czech Republic	98.0	103.5	26	103.0	105.7	19	209.2
26	20	Mackenzie Boyd-Clowes	Canada	103.5	111.1	18	98.5	97.0	27	208.1
27	13	Jonathan Learoyd	France	98.5	104.1	25	100.5	103.8	21	207.9
28	39	Jernej Damjan	Slovenia	97.0	101.1	27	95.5	100.2	24	201.3
29	27	Gregor Deschwanden	Switzerland	99.5	100.1	28	91.5	85.2	29	185.3
30	16	Evgeni Klimov	Olympic Athletes from Russia	94.5	99.0	30	81.5	69.2	30	168.2
31	43	Junshirō Kobayashi	Japan	93.0	98.8	31	did not advance			
32	7	Michael Glasder	United States	98.5	98.7	32	did not advance			
33	29	Timi Zajc	Slovenia	97.0	98.6	33	did not advance			
34	6	Mikhail Nazarov	Olympic Athletes from Russia	94.5	92.1	34	did not advance			
35	42	Dawid Kubacki	Poland	88.0	92.0	35	did not advance			
35	9	Davide Bresadola	Italy	95.0	92.0	35	did not advance			
37	5	Alexey Romashov	Olympic Athletes from Russia	94.0	91.7	37	did not advance			
38	10	Andreas Alamommo	Finland	94.0	91.3	38	did not advance			
39	11	Casey Larson	United States	97.0	89.4	39	did not advance			
40	8	Janne Ahonen	Finland	90.5	85.1	40	did not advance			
41	1	Choi Seou	South Korea	93.5	83.9	41	did not advance			
42	12	Sebastian Colloredo	Italy	91.0	83.8	42	did not advance			
43	14	Vincent Descombes Sevoie	France	90.0	82.4	43	did not advance			
44	3	Viktor Polášek	Czech Republic	92.0	81.9	44	did not advance			
45	18	Alex Insam	Italy	84.0	76.9	45	did not advance			
46	21	William Rhoads	United States	87.0	75.5	46	did not advance			
47	4	Martti Nõmme	Estonia	84.0	73.8	47	did not advance			
48	2	Federico Cecon	Italy	85.5	72.3	48	did not advance			
49	17	Eetu Nousiainen	Finland	83.0	68.0	49	did not advance			
50	23	Antti Aalto	Finland	80.0	60.8	50	did not advance			
