= Biathlon at the 2018 Winter Olympics – Men's mass start =

Men's mass start at the XXIII Olympic Winter Games
- Pictogram for biathlon
- Venue: Alpensia Biathlon Centre in Pyeongchang, South Korea
- Date: 18 February 2018
- Competitors: 30 from 13 nations
- Winning time: 35:47.3

Medalists
1st place, gold medalist(s)		Martin Fourcade	France
2nd place, silver medalist(s)		Simon Schempp	Germany
3rd place, bronze medalist(s)		Emil Hegle Svendsen	Norway

The men's 15 km mass start biathlon competition of the Pyeongchang 2018 Olympics was held on 18 February 2018 at the Alpensia Biathlon Centre in Pyeongchang, South Korea.

== Schedule ==
All times are (UTC+9).

Date	Time	Round
18 February	20:15	Final

== Results ==
The race started at 20:15.

Rank	Bib	Name	Country	Time	Penalties (P+P+S+S)	Deficit
1st place, gold medalist(s)	2	Martin Fourcade	France	35:47.3	2 (1+0+0+1)	—
2nd place, silver medalist(s)	14	Simon Schempp	Germany	35:47.3	1 (0+0+0+1)	+0.0
3rd place, bronze medalist(s)	15	Emil Hegle Svendsen	Norway	35:58.5	2 (1+0+1+0)	+11.2
4	19	Erik Lesser	Germany	35:58.9	2 (0+0+0+2)	+11.6
5	8	Benedikt Doll	Germany	36:06.1	1 (0+0+1+0)	+18.8
6	18	Julian Eberhard	Austria	36:18.0	3 (1+0+1+1)	+30.7
7	20	Erlend Bjøntegaard	Norway	36:19.4	2 (0+0+2+0)	+32.1
8	10	Tarjei Bø	Norway	36:21.9	3 (1+0+2+0)	+34.6
9	25	Jesper Nelin	Sweden	36:21.9	2 (0+2+0+0)	+34.6
10	6	Jakov Fak	Slovenia	36:23.4	1 (0+0+1+0)	+36.1
11	29	Ondřej Moravec	Czech Republic	36:23.6	1 (0+0+0+1)	+36.3
12	9	Dominik Landertinger	Austria	36:47.3	1 (0+0+1+0)	+1:00.0
13	1	Arnd Peiffer	Germany	36:47.5	4 (1+0+1+2)	+1:00.2
14	16	Simon Eder	Austria	37:01.0	3 (1+0+0+2)	+1:13.7
15	26	Fredrik Lindström	Sweden	37:02.6	3 (0+0+2+1)	+1:15.3
16	3	Johannes Thingnes Bø	Norway	37:07.3	3 (0+3+0+0)	+1:20.0
17	7	Dominik Windisch	Italy	37:07.7	4 (0+1+2+1)	+1:20.4
18	12	Lukas Hofer	Italy	37:07.7	4 (1+1+0+2)	+1:20.4
19	23	Antonin Guigonnat	France	37:15.3	5 (1+0+2+2)	+1:28.0
20	22	Klemen Bauer	Slovenia	37:19.8	4 (1+0+2+1)	+1:32.5
21	30	Tero Seppälä	Finland	37:25.0	3 (1+2+0+0)	+1:37.7
22	11	Simon Desthieux	France	37:45.9	5 (1+2+2+0)	+1:58.6
23	5	Sebastian Samuelsson	Sweden	37:58.8	4 (0+1+2+1)	+2:11.5
24	28	Serafin Wiestner	Switzerland	38:00.9	3 (2+1+0+0)	+2:13.6
25	21	Timofey Lapshin	South Korea	38:07.4	1 (0+1+0+0)	+2:20.1
26	4	Michal Krčmář	Czech Republic	38:09.9	5 (1+1+1+2)	+2:22.6
27	13	Benjamin Weger	Switzerland	38:10.5	5 (2+2+1+0)	+2:23.2
28	27	Andrejs Rastorgujevs	Latvia	38:47.4	3 (0+1+0+2)	+3:00.1
29	17	Quentin Fillon Maillet	France	38:57.5	7 (3+2+2+0)	+3:10.2
30	24	Tomas Kaukėnas	Lithuania	38:58.0	5 (2+0+2+1)	+3:10.7
