= Nordic combined at the 2018 Winter Olympics =

Nordic combined at the XXIII Olympic Winter Games
- Nordic combined pictogram at the 2018 Winter Olympics
- Venue: Alpensia Ski Jumping Centre (ski jumping); Alpensia Cross-Country Skiing Centre (cross-country skiing)
- Dates: 14–22 February 2018
- No. of events: 3 (3 men)
- Competitors: 55 from 16 nations

Nordic combined at the 2018 Winter Olympics was held at the Alpensia Ski Jumping Centre and Alpensia Cross-Country Skiing Centre. The three events were scheduled to take place between 14 and 22 February 2018.

== Qualification ==
A total of 55 quota spots were available to athletes to compete at the games. A maximum of five athletes could be entered by any one National Olympic Committee. Competitors were eligible to compete if they had scored points at a World or Continental cup event during the qualification period of July 2016 to 21 January 2018. The top 55 on the Olympic quota allocation list respecting the maximum of four per country qualified to compete.

== Competition schedule ==
The following was the competition schedule for all three events.

All times are (UTC+9).

Date	Time	Event
14 February	15:30	Men's individual normal hill
14 February	18:00	Men's individual 10 km
20 February	19:00	Men's individual large hill
20 February	21:45	Men's individual 10 km
22 February	16:30	Men's team large hill
22 February	19:20	Men's team relay 4 x 5 km

== Medal summary ==
=== Medal table ===
Rank	Nation	Gold	Silver	Bronze	Total
1	Germany	3	1	1	5
2	Japan	0	1	0	1
2	Norway	0	1	0	1
4	Austria	0	0	2	2
Totals (4 entries)		3	3	3	9

=== Events ===
Event	Gold		Silver		Bronze	
Individual large hill/10 km	Johannes Rydzek; Germany	23:52.5	Fabian Rießle; Germany	23:52.9	Eric Frenzel; Germany	23:53.3
Individual normal hill/10 km	Eric Frenzel; Germany	24:51.4	Akito Watabe; Japan	24:56.2	Lukas Klapfer; Austria	25:09.5
Team large hill/4 x 5 km	Germany; Vinzenz Geiger; Fabian Rießle; Eric Frenzel; Johannes Rydzek	46:09.8	Norway; Jan Schmid; Espen Andersen; Jarl Magnus Riiber; Jørgen Graabak	47:02.5	Austria; Wilhelm Denifl; Lukas Klapfer; Bernhard Gruber; Mario Seidl	47:17.6

== Participating nations ==
A total of 55 athletes from 16 nations (including the IOC's designation of Olympic Athletes from Russia) were scheduled to participate.

- Austria (5 athletes)
- Czech Republic (4)
- Estonia (2)
- Finland (5)
- France (5)
- Germany (5)
- Italy (4)
- Japan (5)
- Norway (5)
- Olympic Athletes from Russia (1)
- Poland (4)
- Slovenia (2)
- Switzerland (1)
- South Korea (1)
- Ukraine (1)
- United States (5)
