= Ski jumping at the 2018 Winter Olympics – Men's large hill team =

Men's large hill team at the XXIII Olympic Winter Games
- Venue: Alpensia Ski Jumping Stadium
- Dates: 19 February 2018
- Competitors: 48 from 12 nations
- Winning score: 1,098.5

Medalists
1st place, gold medalist(s)		Daniel-André Tande; Andreas Stjernen; Johann André Forfang; Robert Johansson	Norway
2nd place, silver medalist(s)		Karl Geiger; Stephan Leyhe; Richard Freitag; Andreas Wellinger	Germany
3rd place, bronze medalist(s)		Maciej Kot; Stefan Hula; Dawid Kubacki; Kamil Stoch	Poland

The men's large hill team ski jumping competition for the 2018 Winter Olympics in Pyeongchang, South Korea, was held on 19 February 2018 at the Alpensia Ski Jumping Stadium.

== Qualification ==
Teams which had qualified for this event included:

- Austria
- Czech Republic
- Finland
- Germany
- Italy
- Japan
- Norway
- Olympic Athletes from Russia
- Poland
- Slovenia
- South Korea
- United States

== Results ==
			Round 1			Final round			Total
Rank	Bib	Country	Distance (m)	Points	Rank	Distance (m)	Points	Rank	Points
1st place, gold medalist(s)	12; 12–1; 12–2; 12–3; 12–4	Norway; Daniel-André Tande; Andreas Stjernen; Johann André Forfang; Robert Johansson	136.0; 133.0; 132.5; 137.5	545.9; 141.8; 134.6; 132.3; 137.2	1	140.5; 135.5; 132.0; 136.0	552.6; 145.5; 139.8; 129.7; 137.6	1	1,098.5; 287.3; 274.4; 262.0; 274.8
2nd place, silver medalist(s)	11; 11–1; 11–2; 11–3; 11–4	Germany; Karl Geiger; Stephan Leyhe; Richard Freitag; Andreas Wellinger	136.0; 128.0; 134.5; 140.0	543.9; 139.4; 124.1; 134.5; 145.9	2	134.0; 129.0; 134.5; 134.5	531.8; 131.7; 126.0; 135.8; 138.3	2	1,075.7; 271.1; 250.1; 270.3; 284.2
3rd place, bronze medalist(s)	10; 10–1; 10–2; 10–3; 10–4	Poland; Maciej Kot; Stefan Hula; Dawid Kubacki; Kamil Stoch	129.5; 130.0; 138.5; 139.0	540.9; 128.3; 129.8; 139.7; 143.1	3	133.0; 134.0; 135.5; 134.5	531.5; 127.0; 134.8; 135.3; 134.4	3	1,072.4; 255.3; 264.6; 275.0; 277.5
4	9; 9–1; 9–2; 9–3; 9–4	Austria; Stefan Kraft; Manuel Fettner; Gregor Schlierenzauer; Michael Hayböck	133.5; 122.5; 127.5; 133.5	493.7; 131.8; 109.9; 118.0; 134.0	4	126.5; 125.5; 122.5; 136.5	484.7; 116.7; 118.2; 111.3; 138.5	4	978.4; 248.5; 228.1; 229.3; 272.5
5	8; 8–1; 8–2; 8–3; 8–4	Slovenia; Jernej Damjan; Anže Semenič; Tilen Bartol; Peter Prevc	126.5; 125.0; 129.5; 134.5	492.4; 118.9; 116.5; 120.6; 136.4	5	129.5; 123.5; 122.0; 133.5	475.4; 122.2; 111.1; 111.0; 131.1	5	967.8; 241.1; 227.6; 231.6; 267.5
6	7; 7–1; 7–2; 7–3; 7–4	Japan; Taku Takeuchi; Daiki Ito; Noriaki Kasai; Ryoyu Kobayashi	124.0; 126.0; 124.0; 132.5	475.5; 113.6; 117.6; 112.2; 132.1	6	123.0; 123.0; 125.0; 130.0	465.0; 110.5; 109.8; 117.9; 126.8	6	940.5; 224.1; 227.4; 230.1; 258.9
7	6; 6–1; 6–2; 6–3; 6–4	Olympic Athletes from Russia; Alexey Romashov; Denis Kornilov; Mikhail Nazarov; Evgeni Klimov	117.5; 122.0; 115.0; 123.0	409.6; 99.4; 108.6; 90.6; 111.0	7	114.0; 121.5; 115.5; 122.0	400.2; 90.1; 107.5; 93.8; 108.8	7	809.8; 189.5; 216.1; 184.4; 219.8
8	5; 5–1; 5–2; 5–3; 5–4	Finland; Janne Ahonen; Andreas Alamommo; Jarkko Määttä; Antti Aalto	122.5; 117.0; 118.0; 115.0	397.5; 109.7; 97.3; 97.6; 92.9	8	120.5; 115.5; 113.5; 118.5	392.9; 104.6; 94.8; 89.5; 104.0	8	790.4; 214.3; 192.1; 187.1; 196.9
9	3; 3–1; 3–2; 3–3; 3–4	United States; Casey Larson; William Rhoads; Michael Glasder; Kevin Bickner	111.5; 107.5; 113.0; 131.0	377.2; 111.5; 107.5; 113.0; 131.0	9	did not advance			377.2; 111.5; 107.5; 113.0; 131.0
10	4; 4–1; 4–2; 4–3; 4–4	Czech Republic; Viktor Polášek; Vojtěch Štursa; Čestmír Kožíšek; Roman Koudelka	116.0; 107.0; 111.5; 124.0	370.1; 95.7; 78.3; 84.6; 111.5	10	did not advance			370.1; 95.7; 78.3; 84.6; 111.5
11	2; 2–1; 2–2; 2–3; 2–4	Italy; Federico Cecon; Davide Bresadola; Sebastian Colloredo; Alex Insam	102.0; 114.0; 115.0; 122.5	364.5; 69.7; 94.9; 94.3; 105.6	11	did not advance			364.5; 69.7; 94.9; 94.3; 105.6
12	1; 1–1; 1–2; 1–3; 1–4	South Korea; Kim Hyun-ki; Park Je-un; Choi Heung-chul; Choi Se-ou	102.5; 81.5; 110.5; 115.0	274.5; 68.8; 29.4; 83.3; 93.0	12	did not advance			274.5; 68.8; 29.4; 83.3; 93.0
