= Ski jumping at the 2018 Winter Olympics – Men's large hill individual =

Men's large hill individual at the XXIII Olympic Winter Games
- Venue: Alpensia Ski Jumping Stadium
- Dates: 16–17 February 2018
- Competitors: 57 from 19 nations
- Winning points: 285.7

Medalists
1st place, gold medalist(s)		Kamil Stoch	Poland
2nd place, silver medalist(s)		Andreas Wellinger	Germany
3rd place, bronze medalist(s)		Robert Johansson	Norway

The men's large hill individual ski jumping competition for the 2018 Winter Olympics in Pyeongchang, South Korea was held on 16 and 17 February 2018 at the Alpensia Ski Jumping Stadium.

In the victory ceremony, the medals were presented by Irena Szewińska, member of the International Olympic Committee, accompanied by Apoloniusz Tajner, President of the Polish Ski Federation.

== Results ==
=== Qualifying ===
The qualifying was held on 16 February 2018.

Rank	Bib	Name	Country	Distance (m)	Distance points	Judges points	Total	Notes
1	52	Robert Johansson	Norway	135.0	78.0	55.5	131.9	Q
2	53	Johann André Forfang	Norway	137.0	81.6	57.0	128.7	Q
3	33	Ryoyu Kobayashi	Japan	143.5	93.3	52.0	127.6	Q
4	55	Andreas Wellinger	Germany	135.0	78.0	56.0	127.1	Q
5	38	Michael Hayböck	Austria	133.5	75.3	55.5	126.9	Q
6	54	Daniel-André Tande	Norway	131.5	71.7	55.5	126.5	Q
7	57	Kamil Stoch	Poland	131.5	71.7	56.0	125.6	Q
8	40	Maciej Kot	Poland	138.0	83.4	55.0	124.8	Q
9	48	Markus Eisenbichler	Germany	135.0	78.0	52.5	123.6	Q
10	41	Simon Ammann	Switzerland	140.0	87.0	50.0	122.6	Q
11	51	Stefan Kraft	Austria	131.0	70.8	55.5	121.1	Q
12	44	Karl Geiger	Germany	130.5	69.9	53.0	117.7	Q
13	56	Richard Freitag	Germany	130.0	69.0	55.0	116.8	Q
14	49	Dawid Kubacki	Poland	127.0	63.6	54.0	114.7	Q
15	45	Jernej Damjan	Slovenia	132.5	73.5	55.5	113.7	Q
16	23	Evgeni Klimov	Olympic Athletes from Russia	136.0	79.8	54.0	111.8	Q
17	43	Peter Prevc	Slovenia	125.0	60.0	53.5	111.0	Q
18	46	Stefan Hula	Poland	127.0	63.6	53.5	110.4	Q
19	47	Andreas Stjernen	Norway	128.5	66.3	54.0	110.2	Q
20	28	Antti Aalto	Finland	133.0	74.4	54.0	109.3	Q
21	16	Alexey Romashov	Olympic Athletes from Russia	136.0	79.8	53.0	108.9	Q
22	36	Noriaki Kasai	Japan	122.5	55.5	54.0	104.2	Q
23	31	Čestmír Kožíšek	Czech Republic	132.5	73.5	54.0	104.0	Q
24	32	Gregor Deschwanden	Switzerland	128.0	65.4	53.0	103.5	Q
25	25	Mackenzie Boyd-Clowes	Canada	124.5	59.1	53.0	102.4	Q
26	30	Denis Kornilov	Olympic Athletes from Russia	129.0	67.2	52.5	101.7	Q
27	35	Clemens Aigner	Austria	119.5	50.1	52.0	98.5	Q
27	34	Taku Takeuchi	Japan	120.5	51.9	52.5	98.5	Q
29	2	Andreas Alamommo	Finland	129.5	68.1	53.5	97.7	Q
30	42	Anže Semenič	Slovenia	119.5	50.1	51.0	97.5	Q
31	22	Vladimir Zografski	Bulgaria	123.0	56.4	52.5	94.3	Q
32	24	Alex Insam	Italy	123.0	56.4	52.0	93.1	Q
33	14	Mikhail Nazarov	Olympic Athletes from Russia	122.0	54.6	51.0	92.3	Q
34	20	Jonathan Learoyd	France	124.0	58.2	52.5	92.1	Q
35	29	Kevin Bickner	United States	122.5	55.5	51.0	91.1	Q
36	7	Janne Ahonen	Finland	119.0	49.2	52.0	90.8	Q
37	50	Junshirō Kobayashi	Japan	115.0	42.0	49.5	89.5	Q
38	3	Michael Glasder	United States	124.5	59.1	51.0	88.7	Q
39	1	Artti Aigro	Estonia	121.5	53.7	51.0	86.8	Q
40	37	Manuel Fettner	Austria	111.0	34.8	49.5	84.8	Q
41	27	Roman Koudelka	Czech Republic	116.5	44.7	51.0	80.9	Q
42	8	Davide Bresadola	Italy	117.0	45.6	50.5	80.0	Q
43	12	Jarkko Määttä	Finland	116.5	44.7	51.0	79.0	Q
44	18	Martti Nõmme	Estonia	114.0	40.2	49.5	77.2	Q
45	13	Viktor Polášek	Czech Republic	110.5	33.9	49.5	77.1	Q
46	17	Choi Se-ou	South Korea	114.5	41.1	50.0	73.5	Q
47	6	Sergey Tkachenko	Kazakhstan	111.0	34.8	49.0	70.9	Q
48	21	Vincent Descombes Sevoie	France	114.0	40.2	49.5	69.9	Q
49	39	Tilen Bartol	Slovenia	103.5	21.3	46.0	69.6	Q
50	19	Sebastian Colloredo	Italy	107.5	28.5	49.5	68.1	Q
51	26	William Rhoads	United States	115.0	42.0	45.0	67.9	
52	4	Lukáš Hlava	Czech Republic	106.5	26.7	48.0	62.2	
53	5	Casey Larson	United States	104.5	23.1	47.0	61.1	
54	10	Federico Cecon	Italy	100.5	15.9	47.0	50.3	
55	9	Kim Hyun-ki	South Korea	101.5	17.7	46.5	46.4	
56	11	Fatih Arda İpcioğlu	Turkey	96.5	8.7	46.5	36.4	
	15	Kevin Maltsev	Estonia	DSQ				

=== Final ===
The final was held on 17 February at 21:30.

				Round 1			Final round			Total
Rank	Bib	Name	Country	Distance (m)	Points	Rank	Distance (m)	Points	Rank	Points
1st place, gold medalist(s)	50	Kamil Stoch	Poland	135.0	143.8	1	136.5	141.9	3	285.7
2nd place, silver medalist(s)	48	Andreas Wellinger	Germany	135.5	138.8	3	142.0	143.5	2	282.3
3rd place, bronze medalist(s)	45	Robert Johansson	Norway	137.5	138.3	4	134.5	137.0	6	275.3
4	47	Daniel-André Tande	Norway	131.0	128.9	15	138.5	144.2	1	273.1
5	46	Johann André Forfang	Norway	133.0	132.1	9	134.5	139.5	4	271.6
6	31	Michael Hayböck	Austria	140.0	140.4	2	131.0	127.3	9	267.7
7	37	Karl Geiger	Germany	132.0	129.5	14	137.5	138.1	5	267.6
8	40	Andreas Stjernen	Norway	134.5	134.7	6	131.5	132.6	7	267.3
9	49	Richard Freitag	Germany	130.0	131.5	11	127.5	128.5	8	260.0
10	42	Dawid Kubacki	Poland	134.5	137.4	5	126.0	120.6	17	258.0
10	36	Peter Prevc	Slovenia	134.0	132.4	8	127.5	125.6	11	258.0
10	26	Ryoyu Kobayashi	Japan	135.5	134.0	7	128.0	124.0	15	258.0
13	34	Simon Ammann	Switzerland	133.5	131.6	10	130.5	125.0	13	256.6
14	41	Markus Eisenbichler	Germany	130.0	128.7	16	130.5	126.7	10	255.4
15	39	Stefan Hula	Poland	132.0	131.2	12	129.5	122.2	16	253.4
16	38	Jernej Damjan	Slovenia	130.0	124.0	18	130.5	124.3	14	248.3
17	32	Tilen Bartol	Slovenia	130.5	122.4	19	130.0	125.1	12	247.5
18	44	Stefan Kraft	Austria	131.5	130.6	13	125.5	116.8	21	247.4
19	33	Maciej Kot	Poland	128.5	124.2	17	129.5	120.4	18	244.6
20	22	Kevin Bickner	United States	129.5	121.9	20	124.0	113.5	23	235.4
21	19	Mackenzie Boyd-Clowes	Canada	127.5	117.4	23	126.0	117.9	20	235.3
22	27	Taku Takeuchi	Japan	124.0	114.1	27	125.5	120.1	19	234.2
23	18	Alex Insam	Italy	127.5	118.0	22	125.0	114.4	22	232.4
24	43	Junshirō Kobayashi	Japan	122.0	114.8	26	122.0	110.0	24	224.8
25	20	Roman Koudelka	Czech Republic	125.5	115.9	25	122.0	107.1	25	223.0
26	17	Evgeni Klimov	Olympic Athletes from Russia	125.0	116.4	24	118.0	104.2	26	220.6
27	35	Anže Semenič	Slovenia	127.0	118.1	21	120.0	102.4	27	220.5
28	5	Janne Ahonen	Finland	124.5	110.6	30	115.5	100.0	28	210.6
29	24	Čestmír Kožíšek	Czech Republic	124.5	112.0	28	113.0	93.1	29	205.1
30	23	Denis Kornilov	Olympic Athletes from Russia	122.5	111.2	29	110.5	85.1	30	196.3
31	28	Clemens Aigner	Austria	121.0	110.0	31	did not advance			
32	30	Manuel Fettner	Austria	124.0	109.8	32	did not advance			
33	29	Noriaki Kasai	Japan	121.0	107.9	33	did not advance			
34	2	Andreas Alamommo	Finland	120.0	107.6	34	did not advance			
35	16	Vladimir Zografski	Bulgaria	119.5	105.9	35	did not advance			
36	25	Gregor Deschwanden	Switzerland	123.0	105.8	36	did not advance			
37	21	Antti Aalto	Finland	121.5	105.7	37	did not advance			
38	7	Jarkko Määttä	Finland	122.0	105.7	38	did not advance			
39	9	Mikhail Nazarov	Olympic Athletes from Russia	120.0	103.4	39	did not advance			
40	13	Sebastian Colloredo	Italy	121.0	102.7	40	did not advance			
41	14	Jonathan Learoyd	France	119.5	100.1	41	did not advance			
42	10	Alexey Romashov	Olympic Athletes from Russia	119.0	99.8	42	did not advance			
43	12	Martti Nõmme	Estonia	118.0	96.5	43	did not advance			
44	8	Viktor Polášek	Czech Republic	116.5	94.4	44	did not advance			
45	11	Choi Se-ou	South Korea	114.0	93.2	45	did not advance			
46	3	Michael Glasder	United States	114.0	90.5	46	did not advance			
47	6	Davide Bresadola	Italy	124.0	89.1	47	did not advance			
48	1	Artti Aigro	Estonia	107.0	79.4	48	did not advance			
49	4	Sergey Tkachenko	Kazakhstan	107.5	73.5	49	did not advance			
50	15	Vincent Descombes Sevoie	France	105.0	72.9	50	did not advance			
