= Germany at the 2018 Winter Olympics =

- Flag of Germany
- IOC code: GER
- NOC: German Olympic Sports Confederation
- Website: www.dosb.de (in German)

in Pyeongchang, South Korea 9–25 February 2018
- Competitors: 153 (94 men and 59 women) in 14 sports
- Flag bearers: Eric Frenzel(opening); Christian Ehrhoff (closing)
- Medals Ranked 2nd: Gold 14 Silver 10 Bronze 7 Total 31

Winter Olympics appearances (overview)
- 1928; 1932; 1936; 1948; 1952; 1956–1988; 1992; 1994; 1998; 2002; 2006; 2010; 2014; 2018; 2022; 2026

Other related appearances
- United Team of Germany (1956–1964); East Germany (1968–1988); West Germany (1968–1988)

Germany competed at the 2018 Winter Olympics in Pyeongchang, South Korea, from 9 to 25 February 2018, with 153 competitors in 14 sports. They won 31 medals in total, 14 gold, 10 silver and 7 bronze, ranking second in the medal table after Norway at the 2018 Winter Olympics. Germany excelled in ice track events (11 medals), biathlon (7 medals), Nordic combined (5 medals) and Ski jumping (4 medals). The men's ice hockey team took a silver medal, having lost a closely contested final to Olympic Athletes from Russia.

== Medalists ==
Medals by sport
Sport	1st place, gold medalist(s)	2nd place, silver medalist(s)	3rd place, bronze medalist(s)	Total
Biathlon	3	1	3	7
Bobsleigh	3	1	0	4
Figure skating	1	0	0	1
Ice Hockey	0	1	0	1
Luge	3	1	2	6
Nordic combined	3	1	1	5
Skeleton	0	1	0	1
Ski jumping	1	3	0	4
Snowboarding	0	1	1	2
Total	14	10	7	31

Medals by date
Day	Date	1st place, gold medalist(s)	2nd place, silver medalist(s)	3rd place, bronze medalist(s)	Total
Day 1	10 February	2	0	0	2
Day 2	11 February	1	0	1	2
Day 3	12 February	1	1	1	3
Day 4	13 February	1	1	0	2
Day 5	14 February	2	0	1	3
Day 6	15 February	2	0	1	3
Day 7	16 February	0	0	0	0
Day 8	17 February	0	2	0	2
Day 9	18 February	0	1	0	1
Day 10	19 February	1	1	0	2
Day 11	20 February	1	1	1	3
Day 12	21 February	1	0	0	1
Day 13	22 February	1	0	0	1
Day 14	23 February	0	0	1	1
Day 15	24 February	0	1	1	2
Day 16	25 February	1	2	0	3
Total		14	10	7	31

Medals by gender
Gender	1st place, gold medalist(s)	2nd place, silver medalist(s)	3rd place, bronze medalist(s)	Total
Male	8	6	5	17
Female	4	4	2	10
Mixed	2	0	0	2
Total	14	10	7	31

Multiple medalists
Name	Sport	1st place, gold medalist(s)	2nd place, silver medalist(s)	3rd place, bronze medalist(s)	Total
Laura Dahlmeier	Biathlon	2	0	1	3
Arnd Peiffer	Biathlon	1	0	1	2
Simon Schempp	Biathlon	0	1	1	2
Benedikt Doll	Biathlon	0	0	2	2
Francesco Friedrich	Bobsleigh	2	0	0	2
Thorsten Margis	Bobsleigh	2	0	0	2
Tobias Arlt	Luge	2	0	0	2
Natalie Geisenberger	Luge	2	0	0	2
Tobias Wendl	Luge	2	0	0	2
Johannes Ludwig	Luge	1	0	1	2
Eric Frenzel	Nordic combined	2	0	1	3
Johannes Rydzek	Nordic combined	2	0	0	2
Fabian Rießle	Nordic combined	1	1	0	2
Andreas Wellinger	Ski jumping	1	2	0	3

Medal	Name	Sport	Event	Date
Gold	Laura Dahlmeier	Biathlon	Women's sprint	10 February
Gold	Andreas Wellinger	Ski jumping	Men's normal hill individual	10 February
Gold	Arnd Peiffer	Biathlon	Men's sprint	11 February
Gold	Laura Dahlmeier	Biathlon	Women's pursuit	12 February
Gold	Natalie Geisenberger	Luge	Women's singles	13 February
Gold	Eric Frenzel	Nordic combined	Individual normal hill/10 km	14 February
Gold	Tobias Wendl; Tobias Arlt	Luge	Doubles	14 February
Gold	Aliona Savchenko; Bruno Massot	Figure skating	Pairs	15 February
Gold	Johannes Ludwig; Natalie Geisenberger; Tobias Wendl; Tobias Arlt	Luge	Team relay	15 February
Gold	Francesco Friedrich; Thorsten Margis	Bobsleigh	Two-man	19 February
Gold	Johannes Rydzek	Nordic combined	Individual large hill/10 km	20 February
Gold	Mariama Jamanka; Lisa Buckwitz	Bobsleigh	Two-woman	21 February
Gold	Vinzenz Geiger; Fabian Rießle; Eric Frenzel; Johannes Rydzek	Nordic combined	Team large hill/4 × 5 km	22 February
Gold	Francesco Friedrich; Candy Bauer; Martin Grothkopp; Thorsten Margis	Bobsleigh	Four-man	25 February
Silver	Katharina Althaus	Ski jumping	Women's normal hill individual	12 February
Silver	Dajana Eitberger	Luge	Women's singles	13 February
Silver	Jacqueline Lölling	Skeleton	Women's	17 February
Silver	Andreas Wellinger	Ski jumping	Men's large hill individual	17 February
Silver	Simon Schempp	Biathlon	Men's mass start	18 February
Silver	Karl Geiger; Stephan Leyhe; Richard Freitag; Andreas Wellinger	Ski jumping	Men's large hill team	19 February
Silver	Fabian Rießle	Nordic combined	Individual large hill/10 km	20 February
Silver	Selina Jörg	Snowboarding	Women's parallel giant slalom	24 February
Silver	Nico Walther; Kevin Kuske; Alexander Rödiger; Eric Franke	Bobsleigh	Four-man	25 February
Silver	Germany men's national ice hockey team: Sinan Akdag; Danny aus den Birken; Daryl Boyle; Christian Ehrhoff; Yasin Ehliz; Dennis Endras; Gerrit Fauser; Marcel Goc; Patrick Hager; Frank Hördler; Dominik Kahun; Marcus Kink; Björn Krupp; Brooks Macek; Frank Mauer; Jonas Müller; Moritz Müller; Marcel Noebels; Leonhard Pföderl; Timo Pielmeier; Matthias Plachta; Patrick Reimer; Felix Schütz; Yannic Seidenberg; David Wolf	Ice hockey	Men's tournament	25 February
Bronze	Johannes Ludwig	Luge	Men's singles	11 February
Bronze	Benedikt Doll	Biathlon	Men's pursuit	12 February
Bronze	Toni Eggert; Sascha Benecken	Luge	Doubles	14 February
Bronze	Laura Dahlmeier	Biathlon	Women's individual	15 February
Bronze	Eric Frenzel	Nordic combined	Individual large hill/10 km	20 February
Bronze	Erik Lesser; Benedikt Doll; Arnd Peiffer; Simon Schempp	Biathlon	Men's relay	23 February
Bronze	Ramona Theresia Hofmeister	Snowboarding	Women's parallel giant slalom	24 February

== Participants ==
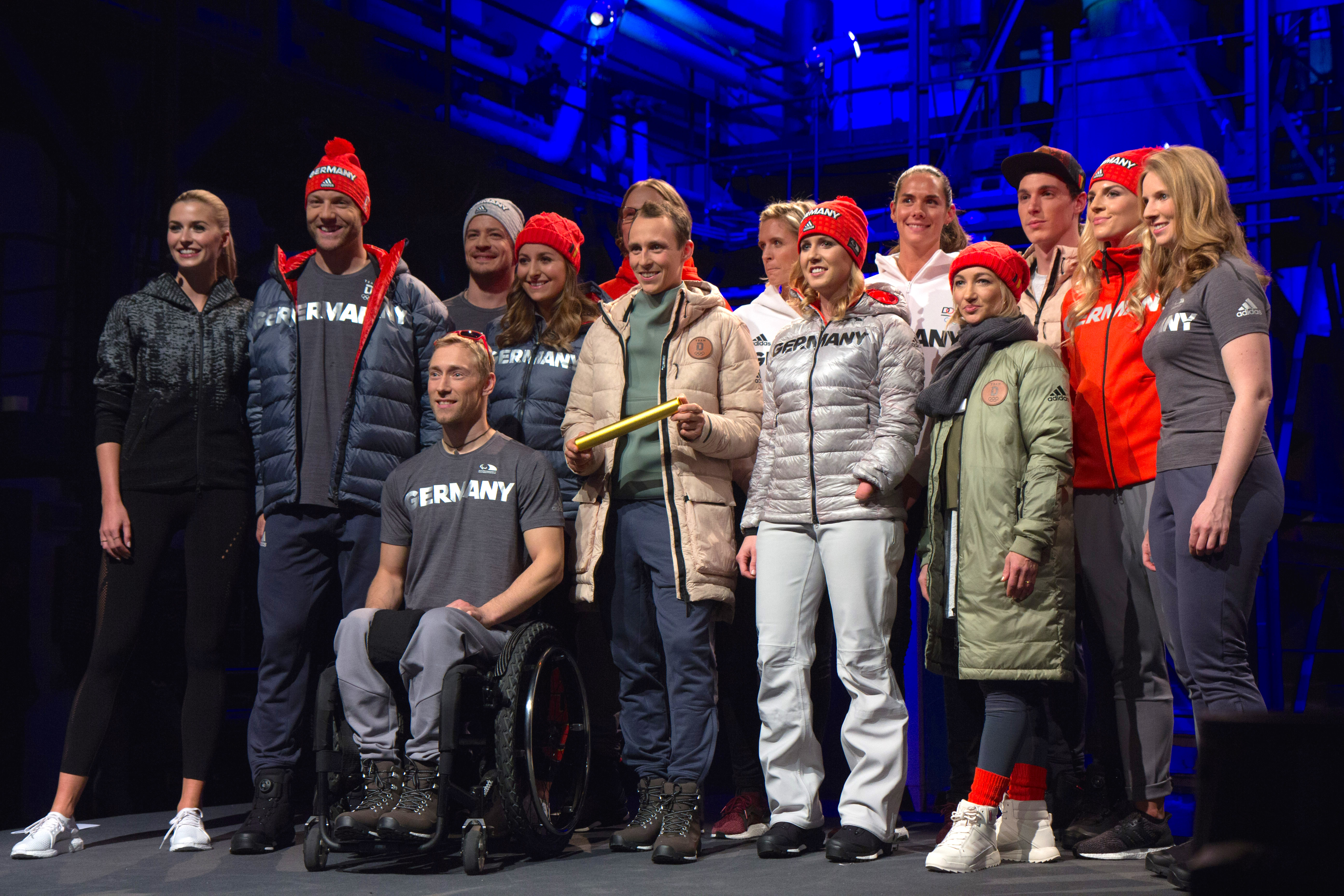

The following is the list of number of competitors participating at the Games per sport/discipline.

Sport	Men	Women	Total
Alpine skiing	6	6	12
Biathlon	6	6	12
Bobsleigh	14	8	22
Cross-country skiing	5	7	12
Figure skating	4	4	8
Freestyle skiing	3	6	9
Ice hockey	25	0	25
Luge	7	3	10
Nordic combined	5	0	5
Short track speed skating	0	2	2
Skeleton	3	3	6
Ski jumping	5	4	9
Snowboarding	7	5	12
Speed skating	4	5	9
Total	94	59	153

== Alpine skiing ==
DOSB announced the 6 men and 6 women participating on 23 January 2017.

Men

Athlete	Event	Run 1		Run 2		Total	
Athlete	Event	Time	Rank	Time	Rank	Time	Rank
Fritz Dopfer	Giant slalom	1:10.69	19	1:11.38	26	2:22.07	26
Fritz Dopfer	Slalom	49.79	22	51.48	17	1:41.27	20
Thomas Dreßen	Downhill	—N/a				1:41.03	5
Thomas Dreßen	Super-G	—N/a				1:25.51	12
Thomas Dreßen	Combined	1:19.24	1	49.72	24	2:08.96	9
Josef Ferstl	Downhill	—N/a				1:42.98	25
Josef Ferstl	Super-G	—N/a				1:26.81	27
Josef Ferstl	Combined	1:21.95	36	DNS		DNF	
Andreas Sander	Downhill	—N/a				1:41.62	10
Andreas Sander	Super-G	—N/a				1:25.21	8
Andreas Sander	Combined	1:21.68	32	DNS		DNF	
Alexander Schmid	Giant slalom	DNF					
Linus Straßer	Combined	1:22.03	39	DNF			
Linus Straßer	Giant slalom	1:11.54	30	1:10.13	4	2:21.67	22
Linus Straßer	Slalom	DNF					

Women

Athlete	Event	Run 1		Run 2		Total	
Athlete	Event	Time	Rank	Time	Rank	Time	Rank
Lena Dürr	Slalom	DNF					
Christina Geiger	Slalom	51.44	19	DNF			
Viktoria Rebensburg	Downhill	—N/a				1:40.64	9
Viktoria Rebensburg	Super-G	—N/a				1:21.62	10
Viktoria Rebensburg	Giant slalom	1:11.45	8	1:09.15	3	2:20.60	4
Marina Wallner	Slalom	51.12	12	50.98	22	1:42.10	19
Kira Weidle	Downhill	—N/a				1:41.01	11
Kira Weidle	Super-G	—N/a				DNF	

Mixed

Athlete	Event	Round of 16	Quarterfinals	Semifinals	Final / BM	
Athlete	Event	Opposition Result	Opposition Result	Opposition Result	Opposition Result	Rank
Fritz Dopfer; Alexander Schmid; Linus Straßer; Lena Dürr; Marina Wallner	Team	Slovakia; W 2*–2	Switzerland; L 2–2*	Did not advance		

== Biathlon ==
Based on their Nations Cup rankings in the 2016–17 Biathlon World Cup, Germany has qualified a full team of 6 men and 6 women.

DOSB announced the 6 men and 6 women participating on 23 January 2017.

Men

Athlete	Event	Time	Misses	Rank
Benedikt Doll	Sprint	23:56.4	1 (0+1)	6
Benedikt Doll	Pursuit	33:06.8	1 (0+0+1+0)	3rd place, bronze medalist(s)
Benedikt Doll	Mass start	36:06.1	1 (0+0+1+0)	5
Johannes Kühn	Individual	53:36.6	6 (1+1+1+3)	58
Erik Lesser	Sprint	24:10.7	1 (0+1)	11
Erik Lesser	Pursuit	34:27.6	2 (0+0+1+1)	11
Erik Lesser	Individual	49:31.1	1 (0+1+0+0)	9
Erik Lesser	Mass start	35:58.9	2 (0+0+0+2)	4
Arnd Peiffer	Sprint	23:38.8	0 (0+0)	1st place, gold medalist(s)
Arnd Peiffer	Pursuit	34:05.8	3 (0+0+1+2)	8
Arnd Peiffer	Individual	51:54.8	3 (0+0+3+0)	21
Arnd Peiffer	Mass start	36:47.5	4 (1+0+1+2)	13
Simon Schempp	Sprint	24:00.2	1 (0+1)	7
Simon Schempp	Pursuit	33:54.4	3 (0+0+1+2)	5
Simon Schempp	Individual	51:54.8	4 (2+2+0+0)	36
Simon Schempp	Mass start	35:47.3	1 (0+0+0+1)	2nd place, silver medalist(s)
Erik Lesser; Benedikt Doll; Arnd Peiffer; Simon Schempp	Team relay	1:17:23.6	10 (3+10)	3rd place, bronze medalist(s)

Women

Athlete	Event	Time	Misses	Rank
Laura Dahlmeier	Sprint	21:06.2	0 (0+0)	1st place, gold medalist(s)
Laura Dahlmeier	Pursuit	30:35.0	1 (0+1+0+0)	1st place, gold medalist(s)
Laura Dahlmeier	Individual	41:48.4	1 (1+0+0+0)	3rd place, bronze medalist(s)
Laura Dahlmeier	Mass start	37:10.1	2 (1+1+0+0)	16
Maren Hammerschmidt	Individual	44:28.0	3 (1+1+0+1)	17
Denise Herrmann	Sprint	22:25.8	2 (0+2)	21
Denise Herrmann	Pursuit	31:54.7	2 (1+0+0+1)	6
Denise Herrmann	Mass start	36:27.2	2 (0+0+2+0)	11
Franziska Hildebrand	Sprint	21:59.9	1 (0+1)	12
Franziska Hildebrand	Pursuit	32:36.5	3 (2+1+0+0)	12
Franziska Hildebrand	Individual	43:38.6	1 (0+1+0+0)	9
Vanessa Hinz	Sprint	21:46.5	1 (0+1)	5
Vanessa Hinz	Pursuit	32:41.4	4 (1+1+2+0)	13
Vanessa Hinz	Mass start	38:52.4	4 (2+1+0+1)	25
Franziska Preuß	Individual	42:06.7	0 (0+0+0+0)	4
Franziska Preuß	Mass start	36:38.9	1 (0+0+1+0)	12
Laura Dahlmeier; Denise Herrmann; Franziska Hildebrand; Franziska Preuß	Team relay	1:12:57.3	11 (3+11)	8

Mixed

Athlete	Event	Time	Misses	Rank
Laura Dahlmeier; Vanessa Hinz; Erik Lesser; Arnd Peiffer	Team relay	1:09:01.5	7 (1+7)	4

== Bobsleigh ==
Based on their rankings in the 2017–18 Bobsleigh World Cup, Germany qualified 9 sleds.

DOSB announced the competing athletes on 23 January 2017. On 2 February 2017, the Bob- und Schlittenverband für Deutschland had to change some positions. Joshua Bluhm had to leave the team, instead of him Christian Poser changed from the Walther-Four-Man-Bobsled to the Lochner-Four-Man-Bobsled but still stayed with Walther in the Two-Men-Bobsled. Substitute athlete Alexander Rödiger was given the place in the Walther Bobslead. The place of Rödiger as substitute athlete was given to Kevin Korona, Paul Krenz is a second substitute. Substitutes for the women's bobsleds are Ann-Christin Strack and Lisette Thöne.

Men

Athlete	Event	Run 1		Run 2		Run 3		Run 4		Total	
Athlete	Event	Time	Rank	Time	Rank	Time	Rank	Time	Rank	Time	Rank
Francesco Friedrich*; Thorsten Margis	Two-man	49.22	5	49.46	5	48.96	1	49.22	2	3:16.86	1st place, gold medalist(s)
Nico Walther*; Christian Poser	Two-man	49.12	3	49.27	1	49.32	6	49.35	4	3:17.06	4
Johannes Lochner*; Christopher Weber	Two-man	49.24	6	49.34	2	49.09	3	49.47	8	3:17.14	5
Francesco Friedrich*; Candy Bauer; Martin Grothkopp; Thorsten Margis	Four-man	48.54	1	49.01	1	48.76	1	49.54	3	3:15.85	1st place, gold medalist(s)
Nico Walther*; Kevin Kuske; Alexander Rödiger; Eric Franke	Four-man	48.74	3	49.16	2	48.90	4	49.58	7	3:16.38	2nd place, silver medalist(s)
Johannes Lochner*; Christopher Weber; Christian Poser; Christian Rasp	Four-man	48.95	6	49.26	7	49.10	9	49.80	17	3:17.11	8

Women

Athlete	Event	Run 1		Run 2		Run 3		Run 4		Total	
Athlete	Event	Time	Rank	Time	Rank	Time	Rank	Time	Rank	Time	Rank
Mariama Jamanka*; Lisa-Marie Buckwitz	Two-woman	50.54	2	50.72	1	50.49	2	50.70	1	3:22.45	1st place, gold medalist(s)
Anna Köhler*; Erline Nolte	Two-woman	51.21	13	51.20	11	51.46	16	51.41	15	3:25.28	14
Stephanie Schneider*; Annika Drazek	Two-woman	50.63	4	50.93	5	50.71	5	50.70	1	3:22.97	4

* – Denotes the driver of each sled

== Cross-country skiing ==
DOSB announced the 5 men and 7 women participating on 23 January 2017.

Distance
Men

Athlete	Event	Classical		Freestyle		Final		
Athlete	Event	Time	Rank	Time	Rank	Time	Deficit	Rank
Thomas Bing	30 km skiathlon	41:03.0	6	36:00.7	16	1:17:03.7	+43.7	11
Thomas Bing	50 km classical	—N/a				2:18:41.1	+10:19.0	30
Lucas Bögl	15 km freestyle	—N/a				35:04.7	+1:20.8	15
Lucas Bögl	30 km skiathlon	41:14.7	15	36:05.2	19	1:17:19.9	+59.9	16
Lucas Bögl	50 km classical	—N/a				2:23:42.8	+15:20.7	46
Jonas Dobler	30 km skiathlon	41:25.1	18	36:31.5	25	1:17:56.6	+1:36.6	22
Jonas Dobler	50 km classical	—N/a				DNF		
Sebastian Eisenlauer	15 km freestyle	—N/a				36:03.8	+2:19.9	32
Andreas Katz	15 km freestyle	—N/a				35:38.3	+1:54.4	25
Andreas Katz	30 km skiathlon	41:39.8	20	38:09.4	42	1:19:49.2	+3:29.2	35
Andreas Katz	50 km classical	—N/a				2:13:32.3	+5:10.2	14
Thomas Bing; Lucas Bögl; Jonas Dobler; Andreas Katz	4 × 10 kilometre relay	—N/a				1:35:13.1	+2:08.2	6

Women

Athlete	Event	Classical		Freestyle		Final		
Athlete	Event	Time	Rank	Time	Rank	Time	Deficit	Rank
Stefanie Böhler	10 km freestyle	—N/a				27:21.8	+2:21.3	25
Stefanie Böhler	15 km skiathlon	22:52.8	25	20:09.8	20	43:02.6	+2:17.7	25
Stefanie Böhler	30 km classical	—N/a				1:28:42.2	+6:24.6	16
Victoria Carl	10 km freestyle	—N/a				27:04.6	+2:04.1	19
Victoria Carl	15 km skiathlon	22:13.5	17	20:40.9	32	42:54.4	+2:09.5	20
Victoria Carl	30 km classical	—N/a				1:32:42.4	+10:24.8	25
Nicole Fessel	15 km skiathlon	DNS						
Katharina Hennig	15 km skiathlon	22:11.3	16	20:48.9	36	43:00.2	+2:15.3	22
Katharina Hennig	30 km classical	—N/a				1:29:48.9	+7:31.3	19
Sandra Ringwald	10 km freestyle	—N/a				27:24.7	+2:24.2	26
Stefanie Böhler; Victoria Carl; Katharina Hennig; Sandra Ringwald	4 × 5 kilometre relay	—N/a				53:13.7	+1:49.4	6

Sprint

Athlete	Event	Qualification		Quarterfinal		Semifinal		Final	
Athlete	Event	Time	Rank	Time	Rank	Time	Rank	Time	Rank
Thomas Bing	Men's sprint	3:16.66	22 Q	3:18.64	3	Did not advance			
Sebastian Eisenlauer	Men's sprint	3:15.06	16 Q	3:16.22	6	Did not advance			
Thomas Bing; Sebastian Eisenlauer	Men's team sprint	—N/a				16:00.55	3 q	16:42.20	10
Katharina Hennig	Women's sprint	3:22.64	25 Q	3:19.55	6	Did not advance			
Hanna Kolb	Women's sprint	3:27.84	36	Did not advance					
Sandra Ringwald	Women's sprint	3:18.48	16 Q	3:13.76	3	Did not advance			
Elisabeth Schicho	Women's sprint	3:23.26	26 Q	3:24.26	6	Did not advance			
Nicole Fessel; Sandra Ringwald	Women's team sprint	—N/a				16:51.67	4 q	17:06.57	10

== Figure skating ==
Germany qualified one male, one female and two pairs figure skaters, based on its placement at the 2017 World Figure Skating Championships in Helsinki, Finland. They additionally qualified one quota in ice dancing through the 2017 CS Nebelhorn Trophy. The team was announced during December 2017.

Athlete	Event	SP / SD		FS / FD		Total	
Athlete	Event	Points	Rank	Points	Rank	Points	Rank
Paul Fentz	Men's singles	74.73	24 Q	139.82	22	214.55	22
Nicole Schott	Ladies' singles	59.20	14 Q	109.26	17	168.46	18
Annika Hocke / Ruben Blommaert	Pairs	63.04	16 Q	108.94	16	171.98	16
Aliona Savchenko / Bruno Massot	Pairs	76.59	4 Q	159.31	1	235.90	1st place, gold medalist(s)
Kavita Lorenz / Joti Polizoakis	Ice dancing	59.99	17 Q	90.50	16	150.49	16

Team trophy

Athlete	Event	Short program/Short dance						Free skate/Free dance					
Athlete	Event	Men's	Ladies'	Pairs	Ice dance	Total		Men's	Ladies'	Pairs	Ice dance	Total	
Athlete	Event	Points Team points	Points Team points	Points Team points	Points Team points	Points	Rank	Points Team points	Points Team points	Points Team points	Points Team points	Points	Rank
Paul Fentz (M); Nicole Schott (L); Aliona Savchenko / Bruno Massot (P); Kavita Lorenz / Joti Polizoakis (ID)	Team event	66.32; 2	55.32; 3	75.36; 8	56.88; 3	16	7	Did not advance					

== Freestyle skiing ==
DOSB announced the 3 men and 5 women participating on 23 January 2017.

Halfpipe

Athlete	Event	Qualification				Final				
Athlete	Event	Run 1	Run 2	Best	Rank	Run 1	Run 2	Run 3	Best	Rank
Sabrina Cakmakli	Women's halfpipe	81.80	31.40	81.80	7 Q	74.20	57.60	20.40	74.20	8

Moguls

Athlete	Event	Qualification								Final											
Athlete	Event	Run 1				Run 2				Run 1				Run 2				Run 3			
Athlete	Event	Time	Points	Total	Rank	Time	Points	Total	Rank	Time	Points	Total	Rank	Time	Points	Total	Rank	Time	Points	Total	Rank
Léa Bouard	Women's moguls	29.18	15.12	55.71	24	28.96	15.36	65.08	15	Did not advance											
Katharina Förster	Women's moguls	29.71	14.52	63.17	23	30.05	14.14	69.38	9 Q	29.63	14.61	72.33	13	Did not advance							

Ski cross

Athlete	Event	Seeding		Round of 16	Quarterfinal	Semifinal	Final	
Athlete	Event	Time	Rank	Position	Position	Position	Position	Rank
Paul Eckert	Men's ski cross	1:10.06	10	3	Did not advance			
Tim Hronek	Men's ski cross	1:10.27	20	3	Did not advance			
Florian Wilmsmann	Men's ski cross	1:10.33	21	4	Did not advance			
Julia Eichinger	Women's ski cross	1:17.56	20	3	Did not advance			
Celia Funkler	Women's ski cross	DNS						

Qualification legend: FA – Qualify to medal round; FB – Qualify to consolation round

Slopestyle

Athlete	Event	Qualification				Final				
Athlete	Event	Run 1	Run 2	Best	Rank	Run 1	Run 2	Run 3	Best	Rank
Kea Kühnel	Women's slopestyle	19.75	59.60	59.60	18	Did not advance				

== Ice hockey ==
=== Men's tournament ===
Germany men's national ice hockey team qualified by winning the final qualification tournament in Riga, Latvia.

Summary

Key:

- OT – Overtime
- GWS – Match decided by penalty-shootout

Team	Event	Group stage				Qualification playoff	Quarterfinal	Semifinal	Final	
Team	Event	Opposition Score	Opposition Score	Opposition Score	Rank	Opposition Score	Opposition Score	Opposition Score	Opposition Score	Rank
Germany men's	Men's tournament	Finland; L 2–5	Sweden; L 0–1	Norway; W 2–1 GWS	3	Switzerland; W 2–1 OT	Sweden; W 4–3 OT	Canada; W 4–3	Olympic Athletes from Russia; L 3–4 OT	2nd place, silver medalist(s)

Team roster

A preliminary 30-man German roster for the men's ice hockey tournament at the 2018 Winter Olympics was released on 16 January 2018. The final roster was announced on 23 January 2017, with 5 players being cut, including Daniel Pietta who was injured prior to the final announcement.

Head coach: (Germany) Marco Sturm Assistant coaches: (Germany) Christian Künast, (United States) Matt McIlvane

No.	Pos.	Name	Height	Weight	Birthdate	Birthplace	2017–18 team
7	D	Daryl Boyle	1.85 m (6 ft 1 in)	89 kg (196 lb)	24 February 1987	Sparwood, British Columbia, Canada	(Germany) EHC Red Bull München (DEL)
10	D	Christian Ehrhoff – A	1.88 m (6 ft 2 in)	92 kg (203 lb)	6 July 1982	Moers, West Germany	(Germany) Kölner Haie (DEL)
12	F	Brooks Macek	1.81 m (5 ft 11 in)	92 kg (203 lb)	15 May 1992	Winnipeg, Manitoba, Canada	(Germany) EHC Red Bull München (DEL)
17	F	Marcus Kink	1.86 m (6 ft 1 in)	96 kg (212 lb)	13 January 1985	Düsseldorf, West Germany	(Germany) Adler Mannheim (DEL)
22	F	Matthias Plachta	1.88 m (6 ft 2 in)	100 kg (220 lb)	16 May 1991	Freiburg im Breisgau	(Germany) Adler Mannheim (DEL)
28	F	Frank Mauer	1.84 m (6 ft 0 in)	90 kg (200 lb)	12 April 1988	Heidelberg, West Germany	(Germany) EHC Red Bull München (DEL)
33	G	Danny aus den Birken	1.86 m (6 ft 1 in)	89 kg (196 lb)	15 February 1985	Düsseldorf, West Germany	(Germany) EHC Red Bull München (DEL)
36	D	Yannic Seidenberg	1.71 m (5 ft 7 in)	82 kg (181 lb)	11 January 1984	Villingen-Schwenningen, West Germany	(Germany) EHC Red Bull München (DEL)
37	F	Patrick Reimer	1.79 m (5 ft 10 in)	86 kg (190 lb)	10 December 1982	Mindelheim, West Germany	(Germany) Thomas Sabo Ice Tigers (DEL)
40	D	Björn Krupp	1.91 m (6 ft 3 in)	95 kg (209 lb)	6 March 1991	Buffalo, New York, United States	(Germany) Grizzlys Wolfsburg (DEL)
41	D	Jonas Müller	1.83 m (6 ft 0 in)	88 kg (194 lb)	19 November 1995	Berlin	(Germany) Eisbären Berlin (DEL)
42	F	Yasin Ehliz	1.77 m (5 ft 10 in)	83 kg (183 lb)	30 December 1992	Bad Tölz	(Germany) Thomas Sabo Ice Tigers (DEL)
43	F	Gerrit Fauser	1.82 m (6 ft 0 in)	89 kg (196 lb)	13 July 1989	Nuremberg, West Germany	(Germany) Grizzlys Wolfsburg (DEL)
44	G	Dennis Endras	1.82 m (6 ft 0 in)	80 kg (180 lb)	14 July 1985	Immenstadt, West Germany	(Germany) Adler Mannheim (DEL)
48	D	Frank Hördler	1.83 m (6 ft 0 in)	90 kg (200 lb)	26 January 1985	Bad Muskau, East Germany	(Germany) Eisbären Berlin (DEL)
50	F	Patrick Hager – A	1.78 m (5 ft 10 in)	83 kg (183 lb)	8 September 1988	Stuttgart, West Germany	(Germany) EHC Red Bull München (DEL)
51	G	Timo Pielmeier	1.83 m (6 ft 0 in)	82 kg (181 lb)	7 July 1989	Deggendorf, West Germany	(Germany) ERC Ingolstadt (DEL)
55	F	Felix Schütz	1.81 m (5 ft 11 in)	89 kg (196 lb)	3 November 1987	Erding, West Germany	(Germany) Kölner Haie (DEL)
57	F	Marcel Goc – C	1.85 m (6 ft 1 in)	92 kg (203 lb)	24 August 1983	Calw, West Germany	(Germany) Adler Mannheim (DEL)
72	F	Dominik Kahun	1.80 m (5 ft 11 in)	78 kg (172 lb)	2 July 1995	Planá, Czech Republic	(Germany) EHC Red Bull München (DEL)
82	D	Sinan Akdag	1.88 m (6 ft 2 in)	89 kg (196 lb)	5 November 1989	Rosenheim, West Germany	(Germany) Adler Mannheim (DEL)
83	F	Leonhard Pföderl	1.82 m (6 ft 0 in)	87 kg (192 lb)	1 September 1993	Bad Tölz	(Germany) Thomas Sabo Ice Tigers (DEL)
89	F	David Wolf	1.91 m (6 ft 3 in)	99 kg (218 lb)	15 September 1989	Düsseldorf, West Germany	(Germany) Adler Mannheim (DEL)
91	D	Moritz Müller	1.87 m (6 ft 2 in)	92 kg (203 lb)	19 November 1986	Frankfurt, West Germany	(Germany) Kölner Haie (DEL)
92	F	Marcel Noebels	1.89 m (6 ft 2 in)	87 kg (192 lb)	14 March 1992	Tönisvorst	(Germany) Eisbären Berlin (DEL)

Preliminary round

Pos	Team	Pld	W	OTW	OTL	L	GF	GA	GD	Pts	Qualification
1	Sweden	3	3	0	0	0	8	1	+7	9	Quarterfinals
2	Finland	3	2	0	0	1	11	6	+5	6	Qualification playoffs
3	Germany	3	0	1	0	2	4	7	−3	2	Qualification playoffs
4	Norway	3	0	0	1	2	2	11	−9	1	Qualification playoffs

Source: IIHF

15 February 2018; 12:10	Finland	5–2 (2–1, 2–0, 1–1)	Germany	Gangneung Hockey Centre, Gangneung; Attendance: 3,695

Game reference

Mikko Koskinen
Goalies
Danny aus den Birken
Referees:
(Canada) Oliver Gouin
(Slovakia) Jozef Kubuš
Linesmen:
(Switzerland) Nicolas Fluri
(Czech Republic) Miroslav Lhotský

Lepistö (Kontiola, Tolvanen) (PP) – 03:13	1–0
	1–1	08:44 – Macek (Ehrhoff, Wolf) (PP)
Pyörälä (Lajunen, Manninen) – 15:30	2–1
Tolvanen (Hartikainen, Kemppainen) (PP) – 37:22	3–1
Kukkonen (Kontiola, Tolvanen) – 38:43	4–1
	4–2	41:51 – Hördler
Kemppainen (Tolvanen, Lepistö) (PP) – 52:48	5–2

10 min
Penalties
10 min
20
Shots
24

16 February 2018; 21:10	Sweden	1–0 (1–0, 0–0, 0–0)	Germany	Kwandong Hockey Centre, Gangneung; Attendance: 3,077

Game reference
Jhonas Enroth	Goalies	Timo Pielmeier	Referees: (United States) Timothy Mayer (Russia) Konstantin Olenin; Linesmen: (Switzerland) Roman Kaderli (Canada) Nathan Vanoosten
Stålberg (Zackrisson, Bergström) – 02:00 / 1–0			Referees: (United States) Timothy Mayer (Russia) Konstantin Olenin; Linesmen: (Switzerland) Roman Kaderli (Canada) Nathan Vanoosten
10 min	Penalties	6 min	Referees: (United States) Timothy Mayer (Russia) Konstantin Olenin; Linesmen: (Switzerland) Roman Kaderli (Canada) Nathan Vanoosten
26	Shots	28	Referees: (United States) Timothy Mayer (Russia) Konstantin Olenin; Linesmen: (Switzerland) Roman Kaderli (Canada) Nathan Vanoosten

18 February 2018; 12:10	Germany	2–1 GWS (0–0, 1–0, 0–1) (OT: 0–0) (SO: 1–0)	Norway	Gangneung Hockey Centre, Gangneung; Attendance: 5,534

Game reference
Danny aus den Birken	Goalies	Lars Haugen	Referees: (United States) Mark Lemelin (Finland) Anssi Salonen; Linesmen: (Sweden) Jimmy Dahmen (Russia) Alexander Otmakhov
Hager (Kahun, Macek) (PP) – 32:53 / 1–0; / 1–1 / 45:19 – Reichenberg (Holøs, Bastiansen)			Referees: (United States) Mark Lemelin (Finland) Anssi Salonen; Linesmen: (Sweden) Jimmy Dahmen (Russia) Alexander Otmakhov
Hager; Plachta; Kahun	Shootout	(miss) Bastiansen; (miss) Reichenberg; (miss) M. Olimb	Referees: (United States) Mark Lemelin (Finland) Anssi Salonen; Linesmen: (Sweden) Jimmy Dahmen (Russia) Alexander Otmakhov
10 min	Penalties	55 min	Referees: (United States) Mark Lemelin (Finland) Anssi Salonen; Linesmen: (Sweden) Jimmy Dahmen (Russia) Alexander Otmakhov
38	Shots	29	Referees: (United States) Mark Lemelin (Finland) Anssi Salonen; Linesmen: (Sweden) Jimmy Dahmen (Russia) Alexander Otmakhov

Qualification playoff

20 February 2018; 21:10	Switzerland	1–2 OT (0–1, 1–0, 0–0) (OT: 0–1)	Germany	Kwandong Hockey Centre, Pyeongchang; Attendance: 2,878

Game reference

Jonas Hiller
Goalies
Danny aus den Birken
Referees:
(Czech Republic) Jan Hribik
(Sweden) Linus Öhlund
Linesmen:
(United States) Fraser McIntyre
(Finland) Hannu Sormunen

	0–1	01:19 – Pföderl (Hördler, Hager) (PP)
Moser (Ambühl, Suter) – 23:40	1–1
	1–2	60:26 – Seidenberg (Kahun, Mauer)

29 min
Penalties
12 min
21
Shots
25

Quarterfinal

21 February 2018; 21:10	Sweden	3–4 OT (0–2, 0–0, 3–1) (OT 0–1)	Germany	Kwandong Hockey Centre, Pyeongchang; Attendance: 2,092

Game reference

Viktor Fasth
Goalies
Danny aus den Birken
Referees:
(United States) Mark Lemelin
(Finland) Aleksi Rantala
Linesmen:
(Czech Republic) Miroslav Lhotský
(Canada) Nathan Vanoosten

	0–1	13:48 – Ehrhoff (Hager, Schütz) (PP)
	0–2	14:17 – Noebels (Kink)
Lander (Dahlin, Omark) – 46:25	1–2
	1–3	48:28 – Kahun (Mauer)
Hersley (Omark, Wikstrand) (PP) – 49:35	2–3
Wikstrand (Zackrisson) – 51:37	3–3
	3–4	61:30 – Reimer (Ehliz, Boyle)

4 min
Penalties
6 min
34
Shots
25

Semifinal

23 February 2018; 21:10	Canada	3–4 (0–1, 1–3, 2–0)	Germany	Gangneung Hockey Centre, Pyeongchang; Attendance: 4,057

Game reference

Kevin Poulin
Goalies
Danny aus den Birken
Referees:
(Slovakia) Jozef Kubuš
(United States) Timothy Mayer
Linesmen:
(United States) Fraser McIntyre
(Russia) Alexander Otmakhov

	0–1	14:43 – Macek (Kahun) (PP2)
	0–2	23:21 – Plachta (Hager)
	0–3	26:49 – Mauer (Goc, Wolf)
Brulé (Lee, Noreau) (PP) – 28:17	1–3
	1–4	32:31 – Hager (Plachta, Schütz) (PP)
Robinson (Thomas, Raymond) – 42:42	2–4
Roy (Lee, Noreau) (PP) – 49:42	3–4

35 min
Penalties
16 min
31
Shots
15

Final

25 February 2018; 13:10	(gold) Olympic Athletes from Russia	4–3 OT (1–0, 0–1, 2–2) (OT 1–0)	Germany (silver)	Gangneung Hockey Centre, Gangneung; Attendance: 5,075

Game reference

Vasily Koshechkin
Goalies
Danny aus den Birken
Referees:
(United States) Mark Lemelin
(Finland) Aleksi Rantala
Linesmen:
(Sweden) Jimmy Dahmen
(Finland) Sakari Suominen

Voynov (Gusev, Kaprizov) – 19:59	1–0
	1–1	29:32 – Schütz (Macek, Hager)
Gusev (Kaprizov, Datsyuk) – 53:21	2–1
	2–2	53:31 – Kahun (Mauer, Ehliz)
	2–3	56:44 – J. Müller (Ehliz, Hördler)
Gusev (Zub, Kaprizov) (SH, EA) – 59:04	3–3
Kaprizov (Gusev, Voynov) (PP) – 69:40	4–3

4 min
Penalties
6 min
30
Shots
25

== Luge ==
Based on results of the 2017–18 Luge World Cup, Germany qualified ten athletes and a relay team. The team consists of three athletes each in the individual events and two doubles sleds. The team was officially named on 16 January 2018.

Men

Athlete	Event	Run 1		Run 2		Run 3		Run 4		Total	
Athlete	Event	Time	Rank	Time	Rank	Time	Rank	Time	Rank	Time	Rank
Andi Langenhan	Singles	48.083	18	47.850	8	47.630	7	47.870	13	3:11.433	11
Felix Loch	Singles	47.674	2	47.625	1	47.560	2	48.109	19	3:10.968	5
Johannes Ludwig	Singles	47.764	3	47.940	14	47.625	6	47.603	3	3:10.932	3rd place, bronze medalist(s)
Tobias Arlt; Tobias Wendl	Doubles	45.820	1	45.877	1	—N/a				1:31.697	1st place, gold medalist(s)
Sascha Benecken; Toni Eggert	Doubles	45.931	3	46.056	3	—N/a				1:31.987	3rd place, bronze medalist(s)

Women

Athlete	Event	Run 1		Run 2		Run 3		Run 4		Total	
Athlete	Event	Time	Rank	Time	Rank	Time	Rank	Time	Rank	Time	Rank
Dajana Eitberger	Singles	46.381	7	46.193	2	46.577	7	46.448	1	3:05.599	2nd place, silver medalist(s)
Natalie Geisenberger	Singles	46.245	1	46.209	3	46.280	1	46.498	2	3:05.232	1st place, gold medalist(s)
Tatjana Hüfner	Singles	46.322	3	46.339	6	46.392	2	46.660	5	3:05.713	4

Mixed team relay

Athlete	Event	Run 1		Run 2		Run 3		Total	
Athlete	Event	Time	Rank	Time	Rank	Time	Rank	Time	Rank
Tobias Arlt; Natalie Geisenberger; Johannes Ludwig; Tobias Wendl	Team relay	46.870	1	48.822	5	48.825	1	2:24.517	1st place, gold medalist(s)

== Nordic combined ==
DOSB announced the 5 athletes participating on 23 January 2017.

Athlete	Event	Ski jumping			Cross-country		Total	
Athlete	Event	Distance	Points	Rank	Time	Rank	Time	Rank
Eric Frenzel	Normal hill/10 km	106.5	121.7	5	24:19.4	6	24:51.4	1st place, gold medalist(s)
Eric Frenzel	Large hill/10 km	136.5	132.9	4	23:29.3	7	23:53.3	3rd place, bronze medalist(s)
Vinzenz Geiger	Normal hill/10 km	103.5	105.4	13	24:15.9	7	25:56.9	9
Vinzenz Geiger	Large hill/10 km	129.0	124.0	9	23:42.6	13	24:42.6	7
Fabian Rießle	Normal hill/10 km	94.5	99.9	16	23:53.7	4	25:56.7	7
Fabian Rießle	Large hill/10 km	130.5	130.3	6	23:18.9	3	23:52.9	2nd place, silver medalist(s)
Johannes Rydzek	Normal hill/10 km	101.0	109.1	11	23:53.3	3	25:19.3	5
Johannes Rydzek	Large hill/10 km	133.5	131.2	5	23:21.5	4	23:52.5	1st place, gold medalist(s)
Eric Frenzel; Vinzenz Geiger; Fabian Rießle; Johannes Rydzek	Team large hill/4 x 5 km	532.0	464.7	2	46:03.8	1	46:09.8	1st place, gold medalist(s)

== Short track speed skating ==
According to the ISU Special Olympic Qualification Rankings, Germany has qualified one man and two women.

On 23 January 2017, DOSB announced that they will only use the 2 female quota and nominated the 2 athletes.

Athlete	Event	Heat		Quarterfinal		Semifinal		Final	
Athlete	Event	Time	Rank	Time	Rank	Time	Rank	Time	Rank
Anna Seidel	Women's 500 m	43.742	2 Q	44.325	4	Did not advance			
Anna Seidel	Women's 1000 m	PEN		Did not advance					
Anna Seidel	Women's 1500 m	2:56.976	5 ADV	—N/a		3:00.658	7	Did not advance	
Bianca Walter	Women's 500 m	43.541	3	Did not advance					
Bianca Walter	Women's 1000 m	1:36.128	3 ADV	1:31.085	5	Did not advance			
Bianca Walter	Women's 1500 m	2:30.819	5	—N/a		Did not advance			

== Skeleton ==
Based on the world rankings, Germany qualified 6 sleds.

On 23 January 2017, DOSB announced the 6 competing athletes.

Athlete	Event	Run 1		Run 2		Run 3		Run 4		Total	
Athlete	Event	Time	Rank	Time	Rank	Time	Rank	Time	Rank	Time	Rank
Alexander Gassner	Men's	51.05	9	51.08	12	51.04	11	50.93	8	3:24.10	9
Christopher Grotheer	Men's	51.05	9	51.06	11	51.01	10	50.93	8	3:24.05	8
Axel Jungk	Men's	50.77	3	51.01	9	50.83	8	50.99	10	3:23.60	7
Anna Fernstädt	Women's	51.99	5	52.17	5	51.88	3	52.00	6	3:28.04	6
Tina Hermann	Women's	51.98	4	52.31	10	51.83	1	51.86	4	3:27.98	5
Jacqueline Lölling	Women's	51.74	2	52.12	4	52.04	7	51.83	3	3:27.73	2nd place, silver medalist(s)

== Ski jumping ==
DOSB announced the 5 men and 4 women participating on 23 January 2017.

Men

Athlete	Event	Qualification			First round			Final			Total	
Athlete	Event	Distance	Points	Rank	Distance	Points	Rank	Distance	Points	Rank	Points	Rank
Markus Eisenbichler	Normal hill	102.5	127.7	6 Q	106.0	121.6	7 Q	106.5	118.6	9	240.2	8
Markus Eisenbichler	Large hill	135.0	123.6	9 Q	130.0	128.7	16 Q	130.5	126.7	10	255.4	14
Richard Freitag	Normal hill	102.0	129.1	4 Q	106.0	125.5	4 Q	102.5	114.5	13	240.0	9
Richard Freitag	Large hill	130.0	116.8	11 Q	130.0	131.5	11 Q	127.5	128.5	8	260.0	9
Karl Geiger	Normal hill	102.0	125.5	7 Q	103.5	120.3	8 Q	105.0	116.4	12	236.7	10
Karl Geiger	Large hill	130.5	117.7	12 Q	132.0	129.5	14 Q	137.5	138.1	5	267.6	7
Andreas Wellinger	Normal hill	103.0	133.5	1 Q	104.5	124.9	5 Q	113.5	134.4	1	259.3	1st place, gold medalist(s)
Andreas Wellinger	Large hill	135.0	127.1	3 Q	135.5	138.8	3 Q	142.0	143.5	2	282.3	2nd place, silver medalist(s)
Karl Geiger; Stephan Leyhe; Richard Freitag; Andreas Wellinger	Large hill team	—N/a			538.5	543.9	2 Q	532.0	531.8	2	1075.7	2nd place, silver medalist(s)

Women

Athlete	Event	First round			Final			Total	
Athlete	Event	Distance	Points	Rank	Distance	Points	Rank	Points	Rank
Katharina Althaus	Normal hill	106.5	123.2	2 Q	106.0	129.4	2	252.6	2nd place, silver medalist(s)
Juliane Seyfarth	Normal hill	102.5	108.3	8 Q	90.0	86.0	17	194.3	10
Ramona Straub	Normal hill	98.5	104.4	10 Q	98.5	106.1	8	210.7	8
Carina Vogt	Normal hill	97.0	108.6	6 Q	101.5	119.3	4	227.9	5

== Snowboarding ==
DOSB announced the 7 men and 6 women participating on 23 January 2017.

Freestyle

Athlete	Event	Qualification				Final				
Athlete	Event	Run 1	Run 2	Best	Rank	Run 1	Run 2	Run 3	Best	Rank
Johannes Höpfl	Men's halfpipe	53.25	59.50	59.50	23	Did not advance				
Silvia Mittermüller	Women's slopestyle	Canceled				1.00	DNS	CAN	1.00	26

Qualification Legend: QF – Qualify directly to final; QS – Qualify to semifinal

Parallel

Athlete	Event	Qualification		Round of 16	Quarterfinal	Semifinal	Final	
Athlete	Event	Time	Rank	Opposition Time	Opposition Time	Opposition Time	Opposition Time	Rank
Stefan Baumeister	Men's giant slalom	1:25.37	7 Q	Kislinger (AUT); W –0.22	Košir (SLO); L +3.07	Did not advance		
Alexander Bergmann	Men's giant slalom	1:29.25	31	Did not advance				
Patrick Bussler	Men's giant slalom	1:26.77	25	Did not advance				
Ramona Hofmeister	Women's giant slalom	1:31.98	5 Q	Jenny (SUI); W DNF	Meschik (AUT); W –0.78	Ledecká (CZE); L DNF	Zavarzina (OAR); W +4.07	3rd place, bronze medalist(s)
Selina Jörg	Women's giant slalom	1:30.27	3 Q	Tudegesheva (OAR); W -0.65	Takeuchi (JPN); W –0.62	Zavarzina (OAR); W DNF	Ledecká (CZE); L +0.46	2nd place, silver medalist(s)
Carolin Langenhorst	Women's giant slalom	1:31.58	4 Q	Meschik (AUT); L +0.02	Did not advance			
Anke Wöhrer	Women's giant slalom	1:34.70	21	Did not advance				

Snowboard cross

Athlete	Event	Seeding						1/8 final	Quarterfinal	Semifinal	Final	
Athlete	Event	Run 1		Run 2		Best	Seed	1/8 final	Quarterfinal	Semifinal	Final	
Athlete	Event	Time	Rank	Time	Rank	Best	Seed	Position	Position	Position	Position	Rank
Paul Berg	Men's snowboard cross	1:14.39	14	Bye		1:14.39	14	2 Q	5	Did not advance		
Martin Nörl	Men's snowboard cross	1:14.12	7	Bye		1:14.12	7	1 Q	1 Q	4 FB	2	8
Konstantin Schad	Men's snowboard cross	1:15.73	30	DNS		1:15.73	33	4	Did not advance			
Jana Fischer	Women's snowboard cross	1:22.92	21	DNF		1:22.92	22 Q	—N/a	4	Did not advance		

== Speed skating ==
DOSB announced the 4 men and 5 women participating on 23 January 2017.

Men

Athlete	Event	Race	
Athlete	Event	Time	Rank
Patrick Beckert	5000 m	6:17.91	10
Patrick Beckert	10000 m	13:01.94	7
Joel Dufter	500 m	35.506	29
Joel Dufter	1000 m	1:09.46	14
Moritz Geisreiter	5000 m	6:18.34	12
Moritz Geisreiter	10000 m	13:06.35	9
Nico Ihle	500 m	34.89	8
Nico Ihle	1000 m	1:08.93	8

Women

Athlete	Event	Race	
Athlete	Event	Time	Rank
Judith Dannhauer	500 m	38.534	16
Judith Dannhauer	1000 m	1:17.41	26
Roxanne Dufter	1500 m	2:00.33	24
Roxanne Dufter	3000 m	4:16.87	23
Gabriele Hirschbichler	1000 m	1:16.03	15
Gabriele Hirschbichler	1500 m	1:58.24	12
Claudia Pechstein	3000 m	4:04.49	9
Claudia Pechstein	5000 m	7:05.43	8
Michelle Uhrig	1000 m	1:20.81	31

Mass start

Athlete	Event	Semifinal			Final		
Athlete	Event	Points	Time	Rank	Points	Time	Rank
Claudia Pechstein	Women's mass start	5	8:35.58	4 Q	0	8:41.45	13

Team pursuit

Athlete	Event	Quarterfinal		Semifinal		Final	
Athlete	Event	Opposition Time	Rank	Opposition Time	Rank	Opposition Time	Rank
Roxanne Dufter; Gabriele Hirschbichler; Claudia Pechstein; Michelle Uhrig	Women's team pursuit	Canada; L 3:02.65	6 FC	Did not advance		Final C China; L 3:04.67	6
