= Slovenia at the 2018 Winter Olympics =

- Flag of Slovenia
- IOC code: SLO
- NOC: Olympic Committee of Slovenia
- Website: www.olympic.si

in Pyeongchang, South Korea 9–25 February 2018
- Competitors: 71 (52 men and 19 women) in 9 sports
- Flag bearer (opening): Vesna Fabjan
- Flag bearer (closing): Filip Flisar
- Medals Ranked 24th: Gold 0 Silver 1 Bronze 1 Total 2

Winter Olympics appearances (overview)
- 1992; 1994; 1998; 2002; 2006; 2010; 2014; 2018; 2022; 2026

Other related appearances
- Yugoslavia (1924–1988)

Slovenia competed at the 2018 Winter Olympics in Pyeongchang, South Korea, from 9 to 25 February 2018. 71 athletes competed in 9 sports, including the men's national ice hockey team.

Slovenian athletes won two Olympic medals: biathlete Jakov Fak won silver in men's individual while snowboarder Žan Košir won bronze in men's parallel giant slalom, his third Olympic medal in total. The country ranked 24th in the medal table. The ice hockey team won two games in the preliminary round, against United States and Slovakia, but lost in the playoffs against Norway.

== Medalists ==
Medal	Name	Sport	Event	Date
Silver	Jakov Fak	Biathlon	Men's individual	15 February
Bronze	Žan Košir	Snowboarding	Men's parallel giant slalom	24 February

== Summary ==
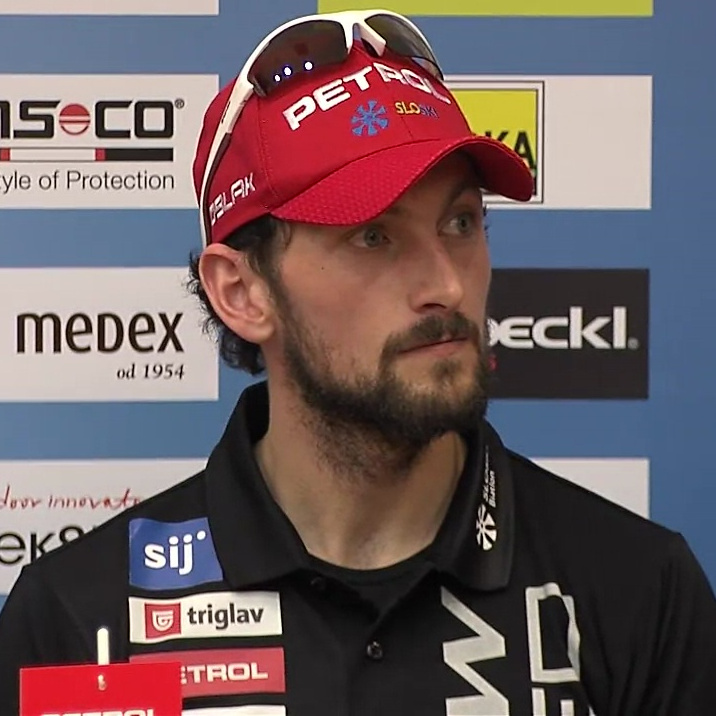
Biathlete Jakov Fak (here pictured in 2015) won a silver medal in men's individual, his second Olympic medal

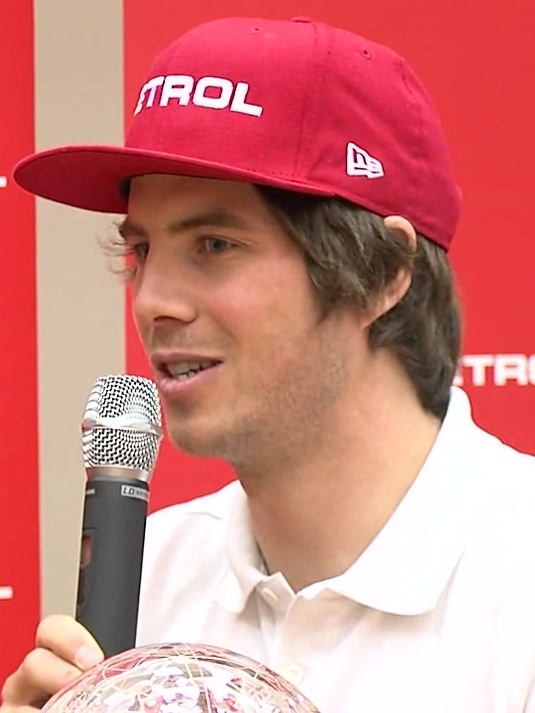
Snowboarder Žan Košir (here pictured in 2015) won a bronze medal in parallel giant slalom, his third Olympic medal

In January 2018, the Olympic Committee of Slovenia officially confirmed 71 competitors who would represent the country at the Pyeongchang Winter Olympics. Slovenia men's national ice hockey team already qualified for the Olympic tournament at the qualification tournament in 2016. Vesna Fabjan, a cross-country skier and a bronze medalist from Sochi, was chosen as the flag-bearer for the opening ceremony. The selection was conducted using a Facebook poll among three candidates, Fabjan, biathlete Jakov Fak, and ice hockey player Mitja Robar. Fak later distanced himself from the poll after being targeted by hate speech in online forums, having previously represented Croatia at the 2010 Winter Olympics. In Vancouver, Fak won a bronze medal in men's sprint.

In Sochi, Slovenia won a record eight medals, including two gold by alpine skier Tina Maze. Since the 2014 Olympics, Maze retired from competitive skiing, as did the biathlete Teja Gregorin. The media expectations were lower than before the Sochi Olympics. Alpine skier Ilka Štuhec, the 2017 downhill World Champion and second in the overall 2016-17 World Cup standings, suffered an injury in autumn 2017 and had to skip the entire 2017-18 season. The strongest potential candidate for medals was Jakov Fak, who had strong World Cup performances earlier in the season, with media noting that freestyle skier Filip Flisar, ski jumpers, or alpine skiers were also capable of achieving good results.

In alpine skiing, the best Slovenian result was a 4th place of Žan Kranjec in giant slalom, while skiers won three more top-10 finishes. In team event, Slovenian team was eliminated in the round of 16 against Sweden. The best result in women's events was an 11th place of Ana Bucik in women's combined.

In biathlon, five men and two women competed. Jakov Fak faced some problems at the first two events but won a silver medal at the men's individual event, covering all 20 targets. Among other prominent results, Fak finished 10th in mass start, Klemen Bauer 10th in individual, and Urška Poje 12th in women's individual, covering all 20 targets.

In cross-country skiing, the best results were achieved by Anamarija Lampič who finished 7th in sprint and 6th in team sprint together with Alenka Čebašek.

At the men's ice hockey tournament, Slovenia competed in Group B with United States, Slovakia, and Olympic Athletes from Russia in the preliminary round. Following the NHL's decision not to allow its players to participate at the tournament, Slovenia's top player Anže Kopitar of Los Angeles Kings was unable to join the team. In their first game, Slovenia beat the United States 3-2 in overtime, having returned from 0-2 in the last third. Goal scorers for Slovenia were Jan Urbas and Jan Muršak. In the second game, Slovenia lost 2-8 to the OAR team, with Žiga Pance and Muršak scoring for Slovenia. Slovenia won against Slovakia 3-2 after a penalty shootout. Slovenia finished 2nd in their group and faced Norway in the playoff. Norway won 2-1 in overtime and Slovenia finished 9th in the overall ranking. Just before the game against Norway, the IOC announced that Žiga Jeglič tested positive for doping. In his reaction, Jeglič stated that he had neglected to report his use of an asthma drug containing fenoterol which his doctor had prescribed for him. Jelgič was suspended from the games and had to skip the game against Norway.

In ski jumping, the best individual results were a 7th place of Nika Križnar in women's normal hill individual and an 11th place of Peter Prevc in men's large hill individual. Slovenian team finished 5th at the team event.

In snowboarding, none of the three athletes in freestyle events qualified for the finals. In parallel event (giant slalom), Žan Košir, Tim Mastnak, and Glorija Kotnik qualified to the finals. Mastnak and Kotnik were eliminated in the round of 16 while Košir won a bronze medal after defeating Sylvain Dufour of France. Košir's semifinal defeat against Lee Sang-ho of South Korea caused some controversy as the photo finish clearly showed Košir crossing the finish line well ahead of Lee. Later, FIS officials explained that the time was measured correctly and that the photo finish footage is irrelevant. Ultimately, Košir stated that he was happy with the medal he won, having skipped the previous two seasons due to back injuries.

Among other events, Tilen Sirše finished 39th in luge, the best Slovenian result in Nordic combined was a 28th place of Vid Vrhovnik in normal hill/10 km, and Filip Flisar finished 7th in men's ski cross. Flisar was the flagbearer for Slovenia at the closing ceremony.

== Competitors ==
The following is the list of number of competitors participating at the Games per sport/discipline.

Sport	Men	Women	Total
Alpine skiing	6	5	11
Biathlon	5	2	7
Cross country	2	6	8
Freestyle skiing	1	0	1
Ice hockey	25	0	25
Luge	1	0	1
Nordic combined	2	0	2
Ski jumping	5	4	9
Snowboarding	5	2	7
Total	52	19	71

== Alpine skiing ==
Men

Athlete	Event	Run 1		Run 2		Total	
Athlete	Event	Time	Rank	Time	Rank	Time	Rank
Martin Čater	Giant slalom	DNF					
Martin Čater	Super-G	—N/a				DNF	
Martin Čater	Downhill	—N/a				1:42.53	19
Martin Čater	Combined	1:20.57	13	DNF			
Štefan Hadalin	Slalom	DNF					
Štefan Hadalin	Giant slalom	1:11.53	29	1:10.13	4	2:21.66	21
Štefan Hadalin	Combined	1:21.15	21	47.79	7	2:08.94	8
Miha Hrobat	Downhill	—N/a				1:43.61	29
Miha Hrobat	Super-G	—N/a				DNF	
Miha Hrobat	Giant slalom	DSQ					
Boštjan Kline	Super-G	—N/a				1:25.36	10
Boštjan Kline	Downhill	—N/a				1:43.03	27
Boštjan Kline	Combined	1:22.42	43	DNS		DNF	
Klemen Kosi	Combined	1:20.61	16	48.76	15	2:09.37	10
Klemen Kosi	Super-G	—N/a				1:26.50	25
Klemen Kosi	Downhill	—N/a				DNF	
Žan Kranjec	Slalom	DNF					
Žan Kranjec	Giant slalom	1:09.52	9	1:10.25	8	2:19.77	4

Women

Athlete	Event	Run 1		Run 2		Total	
Athlete	Event	Time	Rank	Time	Rank	Time	Rank
Ana Bucik	Giant slalom	1:13.38	20	1:10.71	24	2:24.09	21
Ana Bucik	Slalom	52.09	26	50.82	19	1:42.91	24
Ana Bucik	Combined	1:42.77	15	41.99	9	2:24.76	11
Ana Drev	Giant slalom	1:11.64	10	DNF			
Maruša Ferk	Downhill	—N/a				1:42.00	19
Maruša Ferk	Super-G	—N/a				1:23.18	25
Maruša Ferk	Slalom	51.29	15	50.79	18	1:42.08	18
Meta Hrovat	Giant slalom	1:12.76	16	1:09.59	9	2:22.35	14
Meta Hrovat	Slalom	51.93	15	50.57	15	1:42.50	21
Tina Robnik	Super-G	—N/a				1:24.49	34
Tina Robnik	Giant slalom	DNF					

Mixed

Athlete	Event	Round of 16	Quarterfinal	Semifinal	Final / BM	
Athlete	Event	Opposition Result	Opposition Result	Opposition Result	Opposition Result	Rank
Štefan Hadalin; Žan Kranjec; Ana Bucik; Maruša Ferk; Tina Robnik	Team	Sweden; L 1–3	did not advance			

== Biathlon ==
Based on their Nations Cup ranking in the 2016–17 Biathlon World Cup, Slovenia has qualified 5 men and 2 women.

Men

Athlete	Event	Time	Misses	Rank
Klemen Bauer	Sprint	24:36.4	2 (0+2)	26
Klemen Bauer	Pursuit	35:55.9	6 (2+0+2+2)	24
Klemen Bauer	Individual	50:07.0	2 (0+2+0+0)	15
Miha Dovžan	Sprint	25:42.2	2 (2+0)	53
Miha Dovžan	Pursuit	40:13.2	7 (0+1+3+3)	59
Miha Dovžan	Individual	51:54.2	2 (1+0+0+1)	35
Miha Dovžan	Mass start	37:19.8	4 (1+0+2+1)	20
Mitja Drinovec	Sprint	26:13.7	3 (1+2)	72
Mitja Drinovec	Individual	56:06.4	5 (2+1+2+0)	80
Jakov Fak	Sprint	24:34.2	2 (1+1)	23
Jakov Fak	Pursuit	38:10.4	6 (2+1+3+0)	47
Jakov Fak	Individual	48:09.3	0 (0+0+0+0)	2nd place, silver medalist(s)
Jakov Fak	Mass start	36:23.4	1 (0+0+1+0)	10
Klemen Bauer; Miha Dovžan; Mitja Drinovec; Lenart Oblak	Team relay	1:20:17.3	11 (5+6)	10

Women

Athlete	Event	Time	Misses	Rank
Anja Eržen	Sprint	23:20.9	3 (2+1)	46
Anja Eržen	Pursuit	36:22.6	7 (0+2+2+3)	51
Anja Eržen	Individual	45:22.9	3 (0+0+0+3)	35
Urška Poje	Sprint	24:52.8	4 (0+4)	75
Urška Poje	Individual	43:52.7	0 (0+0+0+0)	12

Mixed

Athlete	Event	Time	Misses	Rank
Klemen Bauer; Jakov Fak; Anja Eržen; Urška Poje	Team relay	1:11:55.6	8 (0+8)	14

== Cross-country skiing ==
Distance

Athlete	Event	Classical		Freestyle		Total		
Athlete	Event	Time	Rank	Time	Rank	Time	Deficit	Rank
Miha Šimenc	Men's 15 km freestyle	—N/a				39:16.9	+5:33.0	88
Alenka Čebašek	Women's 10 km freestyle	—N/a				26:30.1	+1:29.6	12
Anamarija Lampič	Women's 10 km freestyle	—N/a				27:26.4	+2:25.9	27
Nika Razinger	Women's 10 km freestyle	—N/a				29:45.5	+4:45.0	69
Manca Slabanja	Women's 10 km freestyle	—N/a				28:47.3	+3:46.8	54
Manca Slabanja	Women's 15 km skiathlon	25:10.1	61	22:16.8	58	47:57.8	+7:12.9	59
Alenka Čebašek; Vesna Fabjan; Anamarija Lampič; Katja Višnar	Women's 4 × 5 km relay	—N/a				53:55.7	+2:31.4	8

Sprint

Athlete	Event	Qualification		Quarterfinal		Semifinal		Final	
Athlete	Event	Time	Rank	Time	Rank	Time	Rank	Time	Rank
Janez Lampič	Men's sprint	3:22:03	46	Did not advance					
Miha Šimenc	Men's sprint	3:17.95	32	Did not advance					
Janez Lampič; Miha Šimenc	Men's team sprint	—N/a				17:24.79	11	did not advance	
Alenka Čebašek	Women's sprint	3:23.38	29 Q	3:30.87	6	Did not advance			
Anamarija Lampič	Women's sprint	3:16.57	11 Q	3:12.46	3 q	3:13.95	4	did not advance	
Nika Razinger	Women's sprint	3:35.11	52	Did not advance					
Katja Višnar	Women's sprint	3:15.24	5 Q	3:20.49	4	Did not advance			
Alenka Čebašek; Anamarija Lampič	Women's team sprint	—N/a				16:39.92	3 q	16:28.24	6

== Freestyle skiing ==
Ski cross

Athlete	Event	Seeding		Round of 16	Quarterfinal	Semifinal	Final	
Athlete	Event	Time	Rank	Position	Position	Position	Position	Rank
Filip Flisar	Men's ski cross	1:09.65	5	1 Q	2 Q	4 FB	3	7

Qualification legend: FA – Qualify to medal round; FB – Qualify to consolation round Source:

== Ice hockey ==
Summary

Key:

- OT – Overtime
- GWS – Match decided by penalty-shootout

Team	Event	Group Stage				Qualification playoff	Quarterfinal	Semifinal	Final / BM	
Team	Event	Opposition Score	Opposition Score	Opposition Score	Rank	Opposition Score	Opposition Score	Opposition Score	Opposition Score	Rank
Slovenia men's	Men's tournament	United States; W 3–2 ОТ	(International Olympic Committee) Olympic Athletes from Russia; L 2–8	Slovakia; W 3–2 GWS	2	Norway; L 1–2 OT	did not advance			9

=== Men's tournament ===
Slovenia men's national ice hockey team qualified by winning the final qualification tournament in Minsk, Belarus.

Team roster

The following is the Slovenian roster for the men's ice hockey tournament at the 2018 Winter Olympics.

Head coach: (Finland) Kari Savolainen Assistant coaches: (Slovenia) Nik Zupančič, (Slovenia) Edo Terglav

No.	Pos.	Name	Height	Weight	Birthdate	Birthplace	2017–18 team
8	F	Žiga Jeglič	1.85 m (6 ft 1 in)	80 kg (180 lb)	24 February 1988	Kranj, SR Slovenia, SFR Yugoslavia	(Russia) Neftekhimik Nizhnekamsk (KHL)
12	F	David Rodman	1.85 m (6 ft 1 in)	83 kg (183 lb)	10 September 1983	Jesenice, SR Slovenia, SFR Yugoslavia	(France) Brûleurs de Loups (Ligue Magnus)
14	D	Matic Podlipnik	1.81 m (5 ft 11 in)	85 kg (187 lb)	9 August 1992	Jesenice	(Czech Republic) Energie Karlovy Vary (WSM Liga)
15	D	Blaž Gregorc	1.90 m (6 ft 3 in)	94 kg (207 lb)	18 January 1990	Jesenice, SR Slovenia, SFR Yugoslavia	(Czech Republic) Mountfield HK (ELH)
16	F	Aleš Mušič	1.76 m (5 ft 9 in)	83 kg (183 lb)	28 June 1982	Ljubljana, SR Slovenia, SFR Yugoslavia	(Hungary) Alba Volán Székesfehérvár (EBEL)
17	D	Žiga Pavlin	1.93 m (6 ft 4 in)	95 kg (209 lb)	30 April 1985	Kranj, SR Slovenia, SFR Yugoslavia	(Czech Republic) Motor České Budějovice (WSM Liga)
18	F	Ken Ograjenšek	1.75 m (5 ft 9 in)	82 kg (181 lb)	30 August 1991	Celje	(Austria) Graz 99ers (EBEL)
19	F	Žiga Pance	1.85 m (6 ft 1 in)	92 kg (203 lb)	1 January 1989	Ljubljana, SR Slovenia, SFR Yugoslavia	(Austria) Dornbirner EC (EBEL)
22	F	Marcel Rodman	1.86 m (6 ft 1 in)	85 kg (187 lb)	25 September 1981	Jesenice, SR Slovenia, SFR Yugoslavia	(Germany) EC Bad Tölz (Oberliga)
23	D	Luka Vidmar	1.85 m (6 ft 1 in)	90 kg (200 lb)	17 May 1986	Ljubljana, SR Slovenia, SFR Yugoslavia	(Hungary) Alba Volán Székesfehérvár (EBEL)
24	F	Rok Tičar – A	1.80 m (5 ft 11 in)	83 kg (183 lb)	3 May 1989	Jesenice, SR Slovenia, SFR Yugoslavia	(Russia) Sibir Novosibirsk (KHL)
26	F	Jan Urbas	1.92 m (6 ft 4 in)	98 kg (216 lb)	26 January 1989	Ljubljana, SR Slovenia, SFR Yugoslavia	(Germany) Fischtown Pinguins (DEL)
28	D	Aleš Kranjc	1.81 m (5 ft 11 in)	92 kg (203 lb)	29 July 1983	Jesenice, SR Slovenia, SFR Yugoslavia	(Germany) ETC Crimmitschau (DEL2)
32	G	Gašper Krošelj	1.88 m (6 ft 2 in)	88 kg (194 lb)	9 February 1987	Ljubljana, SR Slovenia, SFR Yugoslavia	(Denmark) Rødovre Mighty Bulls (Metal Ligaen)
39	F	Jan Muršak – C	1.80 m (5 ft 11 in)	84 kg (185 lb)	20 January 1988	Maribor, SR Slovenia, SFR Yugoslavia	(Sweden) Frölunda HC (SHL)
40	G	Luka Gračnar	1.78 m (5 ft 10 in)	83 kg (183 lb)	31 October 1993	Jesenice	(Austria) EC Red Bull Salzburg (EBEL)
51	D	Mitja Robar – A	1.76 m (5 ft 9 in)	85 kg (187 lb)	4 January 1983	Maribor, SR Slovenia, SFR Yugoslavia	(Austria) EC KAC (EBEL)
55	F	Robert Sabolič	1.83 m (6 ft 0 in)	90 kg (200 lb)	18 September 1988	Jesenice, SR Slovenia, SFR Yugoslavia	(Russia) Torpedo Nizhni Novgorod (KHL)
61	D	Jurij Repe	1.88 m (6 ft 2 in)	88 kg (194 lb)	17 September 1994	Kranj	(Czech Republic) Rytíři Kladno (WSM Liga)
69	G	Matija Pintarič	1.81 m (5 ft 11 in)	83 kg (183 lb)	11 August 1989	Maribor, SR Slovenia, SFR Yugoslavia	(France) Rouen Dragons (Ligue Magnus)
71	F	Boštjan Goličič	1.83 m (6 ft 0 in)	89 kg (196 lb)	12 June 1989	Kranj, SR Slovenia, SFR Yugoslavia	(France) Brûleurs de Loups (Ligue Magnus)
84	F	Andrej Hebar	1.80 m (5 ft 11 in)	83 kg (183 lb)	7 September 1984	Ljubljana, SR Slovenia, SFR Yugoslavia	(Slovenia) Olimpija (AlpsHL)
86	D	Sabahudin Kovačević	1.90 m (6 ft 3 in)	95 kg (209 lb)	26 February 1986	Jesenice, SR Slovenia, SFR Yugoslavia	(Czech Republic) Energie Karlovy Vary (WSM Liga)
91	F	Miha Verlič	1.94 m (6 ft 4 in)	85 kg (187 lb)	21 August 1991	Maribor	(Austria) EC VSV (EBEL)
92	F	Anže Kuralt	1.73 m (5 ft 8 in)	85 kg (187 lb)	31 October 1991	Kranj	(France) Gothiques d'Amiens (Ligue Magnus)

Preliminary round

Pos	Team	Pld	W	OTW	OTL	L	GF	GA	GD	Pts	Qualification
1	Olympic Athletes from Russia	3	2	0	0	1	14	5	+9	6	Quarterfinals
2	Slovenia	3	0	2	0	1	8	12	−4	4 (Note: Slovenia 4 Pts; USA 4 Pts; Slovakia 1 Pts. Slovenia defeated USA 3–2 in overtime.)	Qualification playoffs
3	United States	3	1	0	1	1	4	8	−4	4	Qualification playoffs
4	Slovakia	3	1	0	1	1	6	7	−1	4	Qualification playoffs

Source: IIHF
Notes:

14 February 2018; 21:10	United States	2–3 OT (1–0, 1–0, 0–2) (OT 0–1)	Slovenia	Kwandong Hockey Centre, Pyeongchang; Attendance: 3,348

Game reference

Ryan Zapolski
Goalies
Gašper Krošelj
Referees:
(Czech Republic) Jan Hribik
(Finland) Anssi Salonen
Linesmen:
(Switzerland) Roman Kaderli
(Germany) Lukas Kohlmüller

O'Neill (Roe, Donato) – 17:44	1–0
Greenway (O'Neill, Sanguinetti) – 32:57	2–0
	2–1	45:49 – Urbas (Gregorc, Vidmar)
	2–2	58:23 – Muršak (Gregorc, Verlič)
	2–3	60:38 – Muršak (Tičar, Urbas)

6 min
Penalties
6 min
36
Shots
25

16 February 2018; 16:40	Olympic Athletes from Russia	8–2 (2–0, 4–1, 2–1)	Slovenia	Gangneung Hockey Centre, Pyeongchang; Attendance: 6,018

Game reference

Vasily Koshechkin
Ilya Sorokin
Goalies
Luka Gračnar
Referees:
(United States) Mark Lemelin
(Switzerland) Daniel Stricker
Linesmen:
(Germany) Lukas Kohlmüller
(Finland) Hannu Sormunen

Mozyakin (Datsyuk, Gusev) (PP) – 18:23	1–0
Kovalchuk (Yakovlev, Andronov) – 18:45	2–0
Barabanov (Grigorenko, Kalinin) (PP) – 26:00	3–0
Kablukov (Kovalchuk, Zub) – 28:48	4–0
Kaprizov (Gusev, Kiselevich) – 30:02	5–0
	5–1	33:31 – Muršak (Verlič, Kuralt)
Kovalchuk (Kalinin, Andronov) – 37:16	6–1
Kaprizov (Datsyuk, Kiselevich) – 41:15	7–1
Kaprizov (Zub, Gusev) – 47:12	8–1
	8–2	59:27 – Pance

8 min
Penalties
6 min
34
Shots
15

17 February 2018; 21:10	Slovenia	3–2 GWS (0–0, 2–1, 0–1) (OT: 0–0) (SO: 1–0)	Slovakia	Kwandong Hockey Centre, Pyeongchang; Attendance: 4,085

Game reference

Gašper Krošelj
Goalies
Branislav Konrád
Referees:
(Czech Republic) Antonín Jeřábek
(United States) Timothy Mayer
Linesmen:
(Finland) Hannu Sormunen
(Finland) Sakari Suominen

Gregorc (Muršak, Kuralt) (PP) – 21:00	1–0
Kuralt (Muršak, Gregorc) (PP) – 24:16	2–0
	2–1	35:43 – Bubela (Čerešňák, Graňák) (PP)
	2–2	45:56 – Haščák (Graňák, Čerešňák)

Tičar
Urbas (miss)
Muršak (miss)
Sabolič (miss)
Jeglič
Shootout
(miss) Kudrna
(miss) Ölvecký
(miss) Bakoš
Nagy
(miss) Haščák
4 min
Penalties
8 min
30
Shots
25

Qualification playoffs

20 February 2018; 16:40	Slovenia	1–2 OT (1–0, 0–0, 0–1) (OT: 0–1)	Norway	Gangneung Hockey Centre, Pyeongchang; Attendance: 6,312

Game reference

Gašper Krošelj
Goalies
Lars Haugen
Referees:
(Switzerland) Daniel Stricker
(Switzerland) Tobias Wehrli
Linesmen:
(Czech Republic) Vít Lederer
(Czech Republic) Miroslav Lhotský

Urbas (Muršak) (PP) – 06:38	1–0
	1–1	43:06 – Kristiansen (Røymark, Bastiansen)
	1–2	63:06 – Bonsaksen (Rosseli Olsen, P. Thoresen)

4 min
Penalties
12 min
34
Shots
26

== Luge ==
Based on the results from the World Cups during the 2017–18 Luge World Cup season, Slovenia qualified 2 sleds, but rejected one quota.

Athlete	Event	Run 1		Run 2		Run 3		Run 4		Total	
Athlete	Event	Time	Rank	Time	Rank	Time	Rank	Time	Rank	Time	Rank
Tilen Sirše	Men's singles	49.887	34	58.776	40	49.646	38	Eliminated		2:38.310	39

== Nordic combined ==
Athlete	Event	Ski jumping			Cross-country		Total	
Athlete	Event	Distance	Points	Rank	Time	Rank	Time	Rank
Marjan Jelenko	Normal hill/10 km	73.5	60.4	46	25:27.5	32	30:08.5	44
Marjan Jelenko	Large hill/10 km	109.0	84.4	37	24:57.7	36	28:35.7	41
Vid Vrhovnik	Normal hill/10 km	92.5	90.4	27	24:58.9	23	27:39.9	28
Vid Vrhovnik	Large hill/10 km	112.5	83.4	38	25:08.4	37	28:50.4	42

== Ski jumping ==
Slovenia qualified nine quota places in ski jumping.

Men

Athlete	Event	Qualification			First round			Final			Total	
Athlete	Event	Distance	Points	Rank	Distance	Points	Rank	Distance	Points	Rank	Points	Rank
Tilen Bartol	Normal hill	97.0	115.1	22 Q	106.0	119.0	12 Q	102.0	101.8	23	220.8	16
Tilen Bartol	Large hill	103.5	69.6	49 Q	130.5	122.4	19 Q	130.0	125.1	12	247.5	17
Jernej Damjan	Normal hill	99.5	118.9	16 Q	97.0	101.1	27 Q	95.5	100.2	24	201.3	27
Jernej Damjan	Large hill	132.5	113.7	15 Q	130.0	124.0	18 Q	130.5	124.3	14	248.3	16
Peter Prevc	Normal hill	99.0	120.2	14 Q	98.5	106.2	24 Q	113.0	128.1	3	234.3	12
Peter Prevc	Large hill	125.0	111.0	17 Q	134.0	132.4	8 Q	127.5	125.6	11	258.0	11
Anže Semenič	Large hill	119.5	97.5	30 Q	127.0	118.1	21	120.0	102.4	27	220.5	27
Timi Zajc	Normal hill	94.0	107.1	29 Q	97.0	98.6	33	did not advance				
Tilen Bartol; Jernej Damjan; Peter Prevc; Anže Semenič	Team large hill	—N/a			515.5	492.4	5 Q	508.5	475.4	5	967.8	5

Women

Athlete	Event	First round			Final			Total	
Athlete	Event	Distance	Points	Rank	Distance	Points	Rank	Points	Rank
Urša Bogataj	Normal hill	84.5	71.2	25	81.0	64.0	30	135.2	30
Ema Klinec	Normal hill	91.5	94.2	12	89.0	87.4	16	181.6	14
Nika Križnar	Normal hill	101.0	108.5	7	104.0	114.7	6	223.2	7
Špela Rogelj	Normal hill	80.0	64.3	28	90.5	90.2	12	154.5	22

== Snowboarding ==
Freestyle

Athlete	Event	Qualification				Final				
Athlete	Event	Run 1	Run 2	Best	Rank	Run 1	Run 2	Run 3	Best	Rank
Tim-Kevin Ravnjak	Men's halfpipe	72.50	27.00	72.50	16	did not advance				
Tit Štante	Men's halfpipe	24.50	52.25	52.25	25	did not advance				
Kaja Verdnik	Women's halfpipe	24.75	34.00	34.00	21	did not advance				

Parallel

Athlete	Event	Qualification		Round of 16	Quarterfinal	Semifinal	Final	
Athlete	Event	Time	Rank	Opposition Time	Opposition Time	Opposition Time	Opposition Time	Rank
Žan Košir	Men's giant slalom	1:24.97	2 Q	Kim S-k (KOR); W –1.14	Baumeister (GER); W –3.07	Lee S-h (KOR); L +0.01	Dufour (FRA); W –1.49	3rd place, bronze medalist(s)
Rok Marguč	Men's giant slalom	1:25.98	17	did not advance				
Tim Mastnak	Men's giant slalom	1:25.97	16 Q	Galmarini (SUI); L +0.38	did not advance			
Glorija Kotnik	Women's giant slalom	1:33.52	15 Q	Zavarzina (OAR); L +0.03	did not advance			
