= Frank Mauer =

German ice hockey player (born 1988)

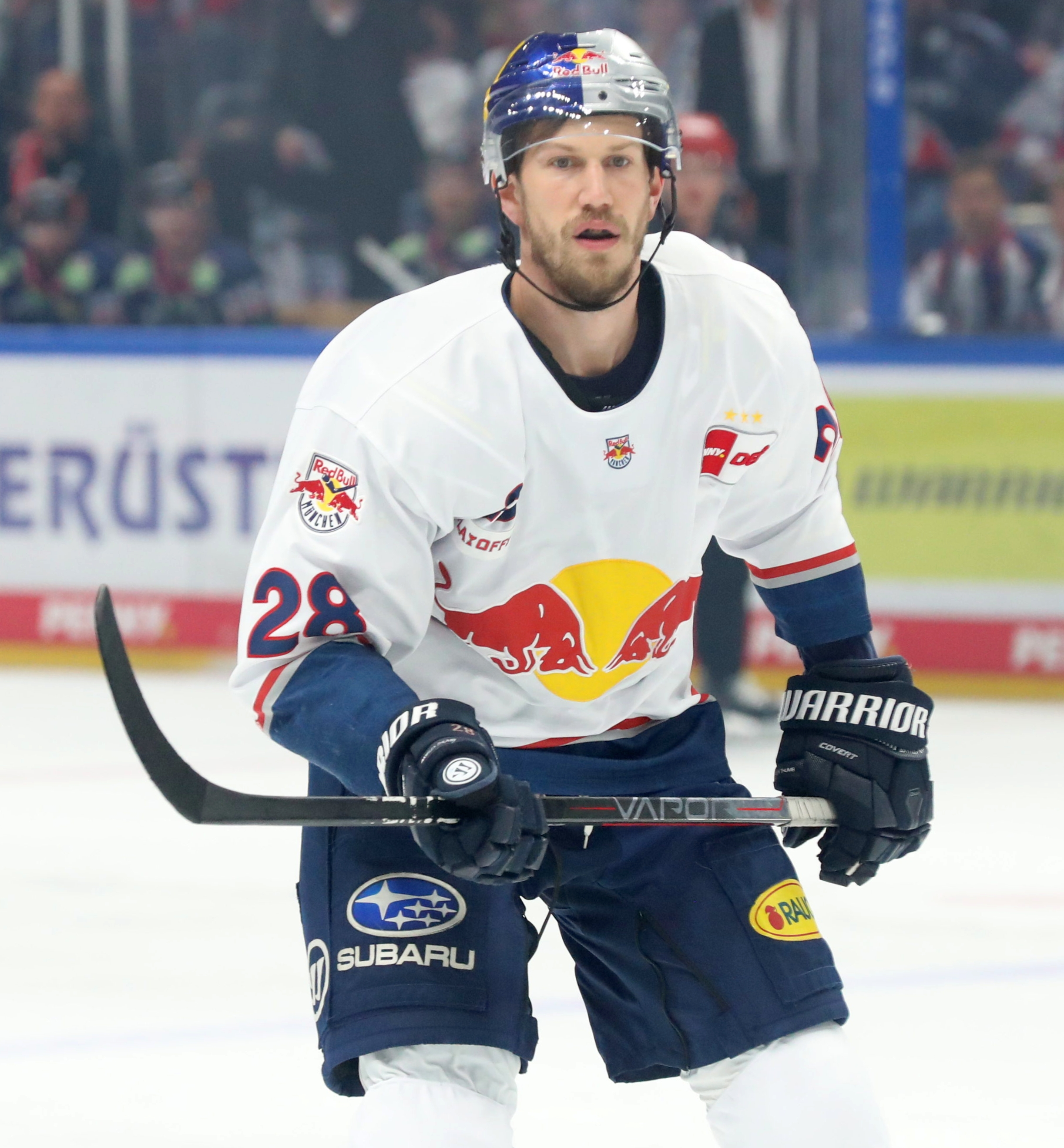
- Born: April 12, 1988 (age 37) Heidelberg, West Germany
- Height: 5 ft 10 in (178 cm)
- Weight: 176 lb (80 kg; 12 st 8 lb)
- Position: Forward
- Shot: Right
- Played for: Adler Mannheim; EHC München; Eisbären Berlin
- National team: Germany
- Playing career: 2005–2023

Frank Mauer (born April 12, 1988) is a German former professional ice hockey forward who played in the Deutsche Eishockey Liga (DEL).

== Playing career ==
Mauer previously played the entirety of his professional career within the Adler Mannheim organization. On April 27, 2015, after claiming his first DEL Championship title with Mannheim, Mauer left the club as a free agent to sign a one-year contract with fellow German club, EHC München.

Mauer played seven seasons with EHC München before leaving as a free agent to extend his career in the DEL by signing a one-year deal with Eisbären Berlin on 23 June 2022. In the 2022–23 season, playing in a depth role, Mauer contributed with 6 goals and 17 points through 51 regular season games as Eisbären failed to qualify for the playoffs for the first time in 22 seasons. He left the club following the conclusion of his contract on 16 March 2023.

On 30 August 2023, Mauer announced his retirement from professional hockey ending his career following 18 seasons.

== Career statistics ==
=== Regular season and playoffs ===
			Regular season					Playoffs
Season	Team	League	GP	G	A	Pts	PIM	GP	G	A	Pts	PIM
2003–04	Jungadler Mannheim	DNL	19	2	5	7	6	4	0	0	0	0
2004–05	Jungadler Mannheim	DNL	32	19	17	36	51	8	3	5	8	6
2004–05	Mannheimer ERC II	GER.4	4	0	2	2	0	—	—	—	—	—
2005–06	Jungadler Mannheim	DNL	35	40	38	78	30	6	8	6	14	4
2005–06	Heilbronner Falken	GER.3	4	1	0	1	0	—	—	—	—	—
2006–07	Heilbronner Falken	GER.3	44	17	18	35	38	11	4	2	6	12
2007–08	Adler Mannheim	DEL	5	0	0	0	0	1	0	0	0	0
2007–08	Heilbronner Falken	GER.2	44	13	17	30	34	8	1	1	2	6
2008–09	Adler Mannheim	DEL	52	5	13	18	24	9	0	3	3	2
2008–09	Heilbronner Falken	GER.2	1	0	1	1	0	—	—	—	—	—
2009–10	Adler Mannheim	DEL	40	6	4	10	12	2	0	0	0	0
2009–10	Heilbronner Falken	GER.2	5	0	5	5	2	—	—	—	—	—
2010–11	Adler Mannheim	DEL	52	6	10	16	27	6	0	1	1	0
2011–12	Adler Mannheim	DEL	51	12	16	28	14	14	1	4	5	2
2012–13	Adler Mannheim	DEL	52	12	15	27	32	6	3	1	4	6
2013–14	Adler Mannheim	DEL	52	10	13	23	18	5	0	0	0	0
2014–15	Adler Mannheim	DEL	40	13	12	25	14	12	7	7	14	6
2015–16	EHC Red Bull München	DEL	16	5	4	9	10	13	5	3	8	0
2016–17	EHC Red Bull München	DEL	30	4	11	15	8	14	5	7	12	4
2017–18	EHC Red Bull München	DEL	49	14	18	32	8	17	6	8	14	6
2018–19	EHC Red Bull München	DEL	52	15	16	31	18	18	4	2	6	6
2019–20	EHC Red Bull München	DEL	35	6	7	13	18	—	—	—	—	—
2020–21	EHC Red Bull München	DEL	38	10	16	26	12	2	0	0	0	0
2021–22	EHC Red Bull München	DEL	43	5	12	17	12	11	0	3	3	0
2022–23	Eisbären Berlin	DEL	51	6	11	17	18	—	—	—	—	—
DEL totals			658	129	178	307	245	128	31	38	69	32

Medal record

Representing Germany

Ice hockey

Olympic Games
Silver medal – second place	2018 Pyeongchang	

=== International ===
Year	Team	Event	GP	G	A	Pts	PIM
2005	Germany	U17	5	0	1	1	0
2006	Germany	WJC18	6	0	0	0	2
2008	Germany	WJC D1	5	7	6	13	6
2011	Germany	WC	5	0	3	3	0
2013	Germany	WC	6	0	0	0	0
2014	Germany	WC	7	1	1	2	4
2018	Germany	OG	6	1	3	4	2
2019	Germany	WC	8	1	1	2	0
Junior totals			16	7	7	14	8
Senior totals			32	3	8	11	6
