= Urška Poje =

Slovenian biathlete

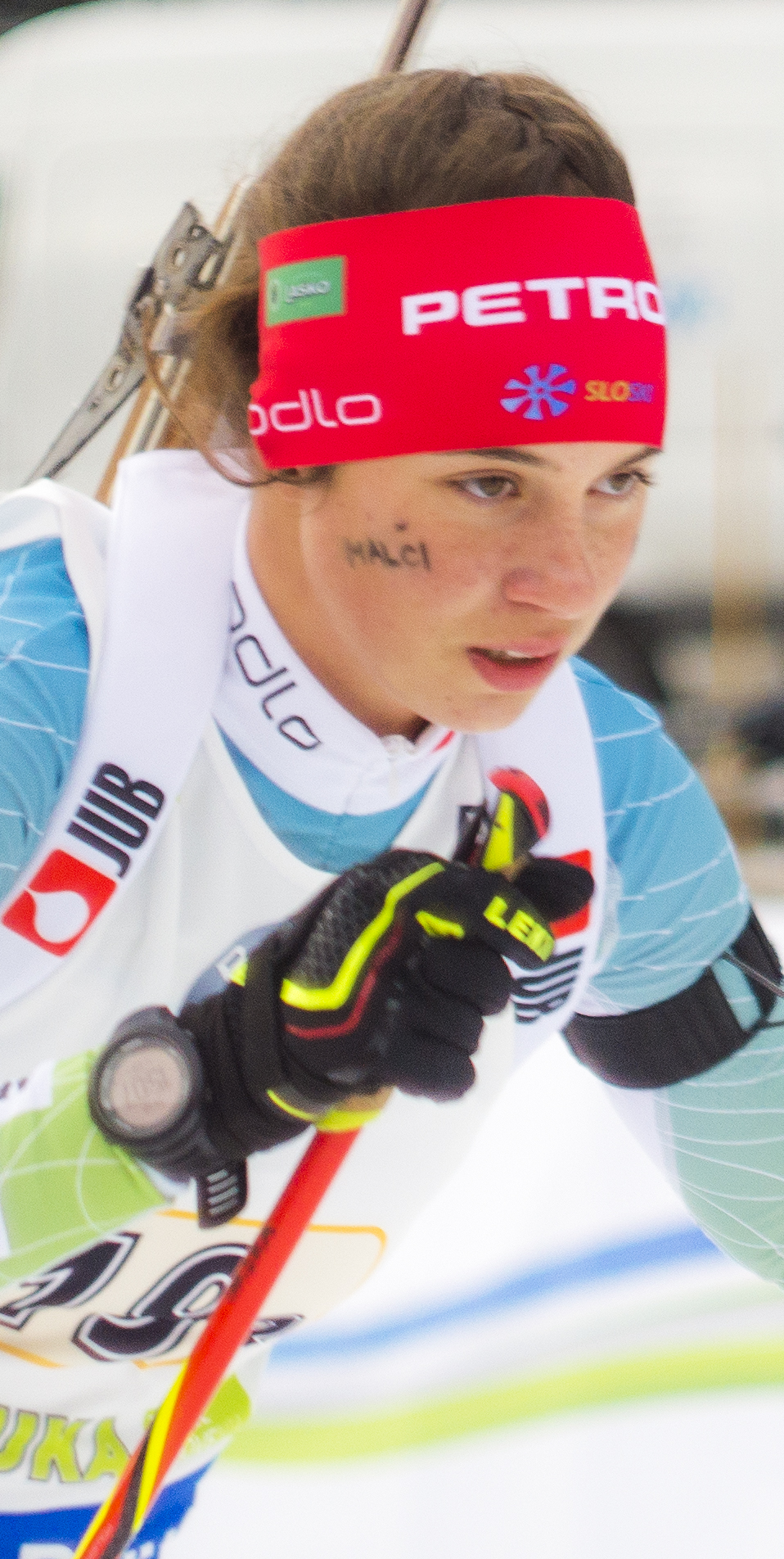
- Urška Poje in 2016

Personal information
- Nationality: Slovenian
- Born: 10 May 1997 (age 27); Postojna, Slovenia

Sport
- Country: Slovenia
- Sport: Biathlon

Urška Poje (born 10 May 1997) is a Slovenian former biathlete. She competed in the 2014/15 World Cup season, and represented Slovenia at the Biathlon World Championships 2015 in Kontiolahti.

== Biathlon results ==
All results are sourced from the International Biathlon Union.

=== Olympic Games ===
0 medals

Event	Individual	Sprint	Pursuit	Mass start	Relay	Mixed relay
(South Korea) 2018 Pyeongchang	12th	75th	—	—	—	14th

=== World Championships ===
0 medals

Event	Individual	Sprint	Pursuit	Mass start	Relay	Mixed relay	Single mixed relay
(Finland) 2015 Kontiolahti	62nd	77th	—	—	—	—	—
(Norway) 2016 Oslo	—	—	—	—	9th	—	—
(Austria) 2017 Hochfilzen	79th	79th	—	—	17th	—	—
(Sweden) 2019 Östersund	83rd	—	—	—	23rd	—	—

*During Olympic seasons competitions are only held for those events not included in the Olympic program.
**The single mixed relay was added as an event in 2019.
