= Andreas Alamommo =

Finnish ski jumper

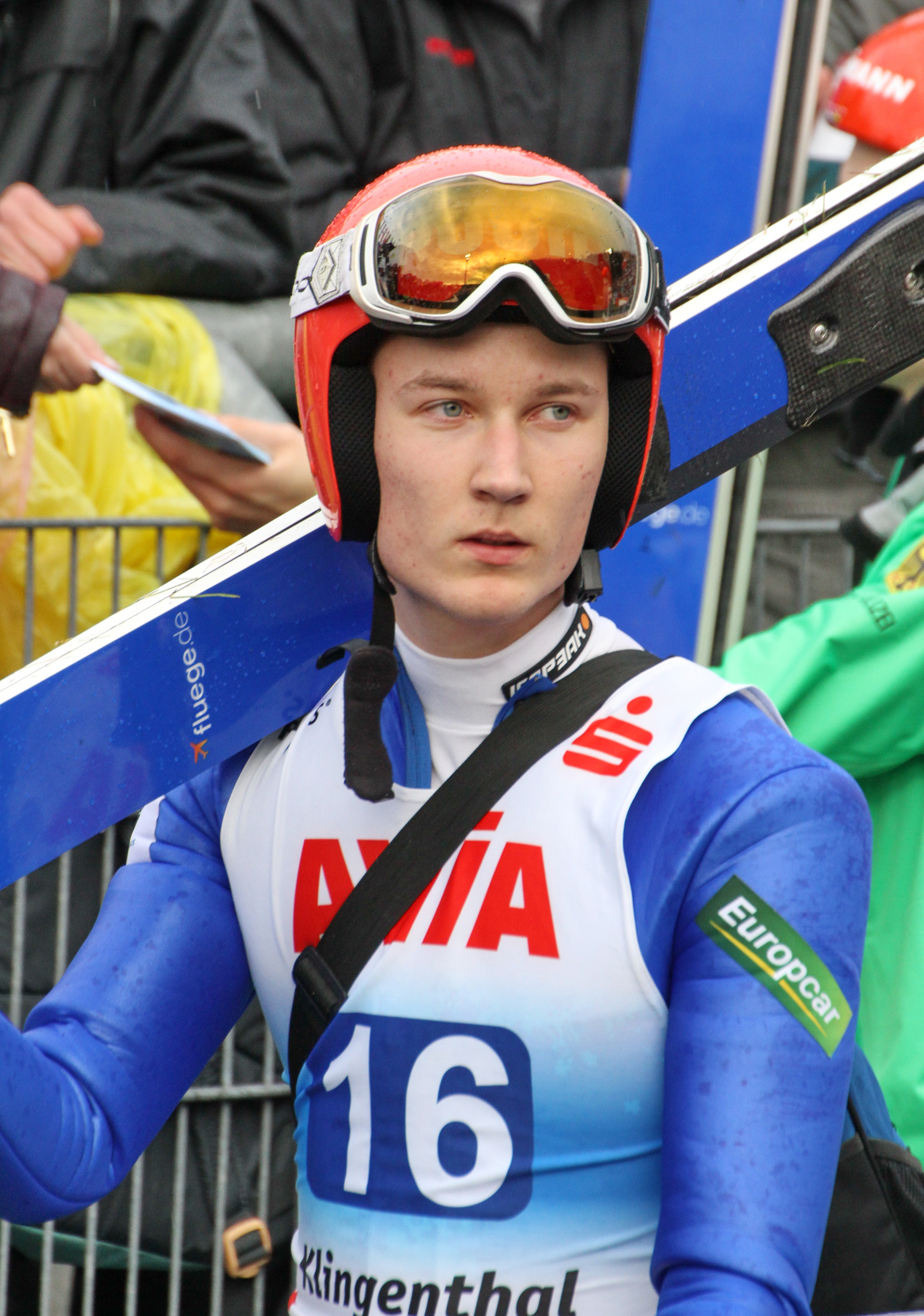
- Alamommo in 2017

Personal information
- Nationality: Finnish
- Born: 23 December 1998 (age 26); Rovaniemi, Finland

Sport
- Sport: Ski jumping

Andreas Alamommo (born 23 December 1998) is a Finnish ski jumper. He competed in two events at the 2018 Winter Olympics.
