= Alpensia Ski Jumping Stadium =

Ski jumping hill in Pyeongchang, South Korea

Alpensia Ski Jumping Centre
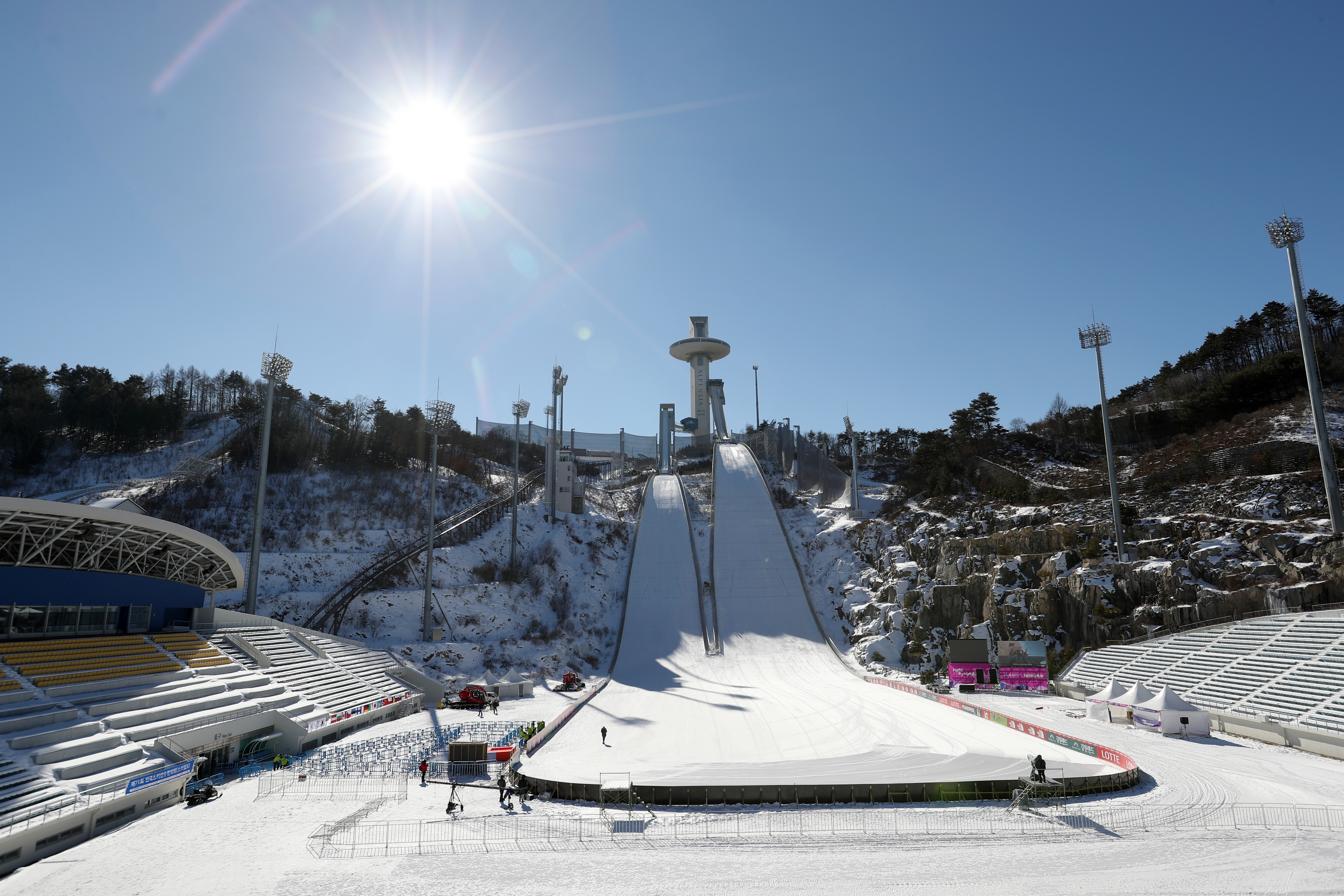
- Interactive map of Alpensia Ski Jumping Centre
- Location: 325, Daegwallyeong-myeon Pyeongchang, South Korea
- Coordinates: 37°39′42″N 128°40′50″E
- Owner: Pyeongchang County
- Capacity: 13,500
- Surface: Snow and Grass

Construction
- Opened: 2008

Tenant
- Gangwon FC (2016–2017)

Large hill

Size
- K–point: 125 metres (410 ft)
- Hill size: 142 metres (466 ft)
- Hill record: 143.5 metres (471 ft) (Japan) Ryoyu Kobayashi (16 February 2018)

Top events
- Olympics: 2018
- World Championships: 2017

Normal hill

Size
- K–point: 98 metres (322 ft)
- Hill size: 109 metres (358 ft)
- Longest jump (unofficial / fall): 114.5 metres (376 ft) (Slovenia) Jure Šinkovec (FIS Cup; 23 January 2016)
- Hill record: 113.5 metres (372 ft) (Austria) Stefan Kraft (16 February 2017) (Norway) Robert Johansson (10 February 2018) (Germany) Andreas Wellinger (10 February 2018)

Top events
- Olympics: 2018
- World Championships: 2017

Alpensia Ski Jumping Centre (Korean: 알펜시아 스키점프 경기장) is a ski jumping hills located at Alpensia Resort in Pyeongchang, South Korea. They hosted the ski jumping and the Nordic combined events during the 2018 Winter Olympics. They also operate as an association football venue by using their landing area as the pitch.

== History ==
The ski jumping hills hosted the ski jumping and the Nordic combined events at the 2018 Winter Olympics. The stadium holds a maximum of 13,500 spectators, and was built in 2008, the capacity was reduced to 8,500 seats.

== Ski jumping events ==
=== Men ===
Date	Hillsize	Competition	Winner	Second	Third
(night) 15 February 2017	HS140	WC	(Austria) Stefan Kraft	(Germany) Andreas Wellinger	(Poland) Kamil Stoch
(night) 16 February 2017	HS109	WC	(Poland) Maciej Kot	(Austria) Stefan Kraft	(Germany) Andreas Wellinger
(night) 10 February 2018	HS109	WOG-I	(Germany) Andreas Wellinger	(Norway) Johann André Forfang	(Norway) Robert Johansson
(night) 17 February 2018	HS142	WOG-I	(Poland) Kamil Stoch	(Germany) Andreas Wellinger	(Norway) Robert Johansson
(night) 19 February 2018	HS142	WOG-T	Norway Daniel-André Tande; Andreas Stjernen; Johann André Forfang; Robert Johansson	Germany Karl Geiger; Stephan Leyhe; Richard Freitag; Andreas Wellinger	Poland Maciej Kot; Stefan Hula; Dawid Kubacki; Kamil Stoch

=== Ladies ===
Date	Hillsize	Competition	Winner	Second	Third
(night) 15 February 2017	HS109	WC	(Japan) Yūki Itō	(Japan) Sara Takanashi	(Slovenia) Ema Klinec
16 February 2017	HS109	WC	(Japan) Sara Takanashi	(Japan) Yūki Itō	(Norway) Maren Lundby
(night) 12 February 2018	HS109	WOG-I	(Norway) Maren Lundby	(Germany) Katharina Althaus	(Japan) Sara Takanashi
