= Olympic Athletes from Russia at the 2018 Winter Olympics =

- The Olympic flag
- IOC code: OAR

in Pyeongchang, South Korea 9–25 February 2018
- Competitors: 168 in 15 sports
- Flag bearer: Volunteer
- Medals Ranked 13th: Gold 2 Silver 6 Bronze 9 Total 17

Winter Olympics appearances (overview)
- 2014; 2018; 2022; 2026

Other related appearances
- Soviet Union (1956–1988); Unified Team (1992); Russia (1994–2014); ROC (2022); Individual Neutral Athletes (2026)

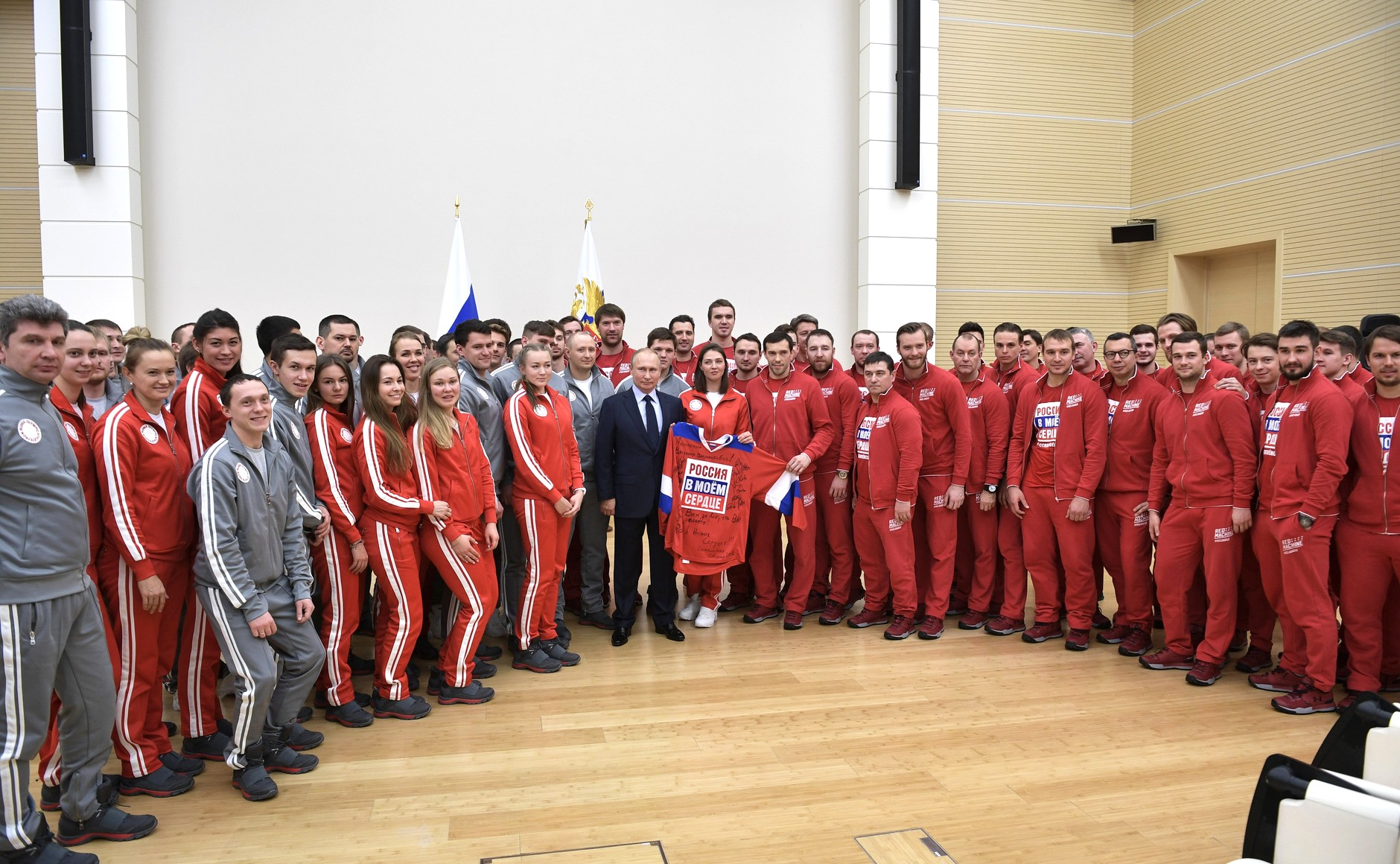
Vladimir Putin, the President of Russia, meets Russian athletes, 31 January 2018

Olympic Athletes from Russia (OAR) was the International Olympic Committee's (IOC) designation of select Russian athletes permitted to participate in the 2018 Winter Olympics in Pyeongchang, South Korea. The designation was instigated following the suspension of the Russian Olympic Committee after the Russian doping scandal. This was the second time that Russian athletes had participated under the neutral Olympic flag, the first being in the Unified Team of 1992.

During the 2018 Winter Olympics, two athletes from this team tested positive for banned substances and were found guilty of doping by the Court of Arbitration for Sport (CAS). Both were sanctioned by the IOC and their results were annulled as a consequence of the ruling.

== Background ==
=== Russian doping allegations ===
In December 2014, German public broadcaster ARD aired a documentary which made wide-ranging allegations that Russia organized a state-run doping program which supplied their athletes with performance-enhancing drugs. In November 2015, the World Anti-Doping Agency (WADA) published a report and the International Association of Athletics Federations (IAAF) suspended Russia indefinitely from world track and field events.

In May 2016, The New York Times published allegations by the former director of Russia's anti-doping laboratory, Dr. Grigory Rodchenkov, that a conspiracy of corrupt anti-doping officials, Federal Security Service (FSB) intelligence agents, and compliant Russian athletes used banned substances to gain an unfair advantage during the Games. Rodchenkov stated that the FSB tampered with over 100 urine samples as part of a cover-up, and that a third of the Russian medals won at Sochi were the result of doping. On 18 July 2016, an independent investigation commissioned by WADA concluded that it was shown "beyond a reasonable doubt" that the RUSADA, the Ministry of Sport, the FSB and the Centre of Sports Preparation of the National Teams of Russia had "operated for the protection of doped Russian athletes" within a "state-directed failsafe system" using "the disappearing positive [test] methodology". According to the McLaren Report, the Disappearing Positive Methodology operated from "at least late 2011 to August 2015". It was used on 643 positive samples, a number that the authors consider "only a minimum" due to limited access to Russian records.

On 9 December 2016, Canadian lawyer Richard McLaren published the second part of his independent report. The investigation found that from 2011 to 2015, more than 1,000 Russian competitors in various sports (including summer, winter, and Paralympic sports) benefited from the cover-up. Following the release of the McLaren report, the IOC announced the initiation of an investigation of 28 Russian athletes at the Sochi Olympic Games. La Gazzetta dello Sport reported the names of 17 athletes, of whom 15 are among the 28 under investigation. As of late December 2017, 13 medals had been stripped and 43 Russian athletes had been disqualified for competition in 2018. The number of athletes under investigation rose to 36 (and eventually 46) in December.

Russia has denied the existence of a doping program with the President of Russia, Vladimir Putin, blaming the United States for "using the Olympics to meddle in the [2018] Russian presidential election", that he would later win.

==== Official sanctions ====
Approved OAR logo

On 5 December 2017, the IOC announced that the Russian Olympic Committee had been suspended from the 2018 Winter Olympics with immediate effect. Athletes who had no previous drug violations and a consistent history of drug testing were to be allowed to compete under the Olympic Flag as an "Olympic Athlete from Russia" (OAR). Under the terms of the decree, Russian government officials were barred from the Games, and neither the country's flag nor anthem would be present (the Olympic Flag and Olympic Anthem would be used instead). On 20 December 2017 the IOC proposed an alternative logo for the OAR athletes' uniforms (shown on right). IOC President Thomas Bach said that "after following due process [the IOC] has issued proportional sanctions for this systematic manipulation while protecting the clean athletes".

As of January 2018, the IOC had sanctioned 43 Russian athletes from the 2014 Winter Olympics and banned them from competing in the 2018 edition and all other future Olympic Games as part of the Oswald Commission. All but one of these athletes appealed against their bans to CAS. The court overturned the sanctions on 28 athletes, meaning that their Sochi medals and results were reinstated, but decided that there was sufficient evidence against eleven of the athletes to uphold their Sochi sanctions. The IOC said in a statement that "the result of the CAS decision does not mean that athletes from the group of 28 will be invited to the Games. Not being sanctioned does not automatically confer the privilege of an invitation" and that "this [case] may have a serious impact on the future fight against doping". The IOC were careful to note that the CAS Secretary General "insisted that the CAS decision does not mean that these 28 athletes are innocent" and that they would consider an appeal against the court's decision. The court also decided that none of the 39 athletes should be banned from all future Olympic Games, but only the 2018 Games. Three of the 42 Russian athletes that originally appealed are still waiting for their hearing, which will be conducted after the 2018 Games.

An original pool of 500 Russian athletes was put forward for consideration for the 2018 Games and 111 were immediately removed from consideration. The remaining athletes had to meet pre-games conditions such as further pre-games tests and reanalysis from stored samples. Only if these requirements were met would the athletes be considered for invitation to the Games. None of the athletes who had been sanctioned by the Oswald Commission were still in the pool at this stage. The final number of neutral Russian athletes invited to compete was 169 and, after speed skater Olga Graf dropped out, the eventual total was 168.

==== Reaction in Russia ====
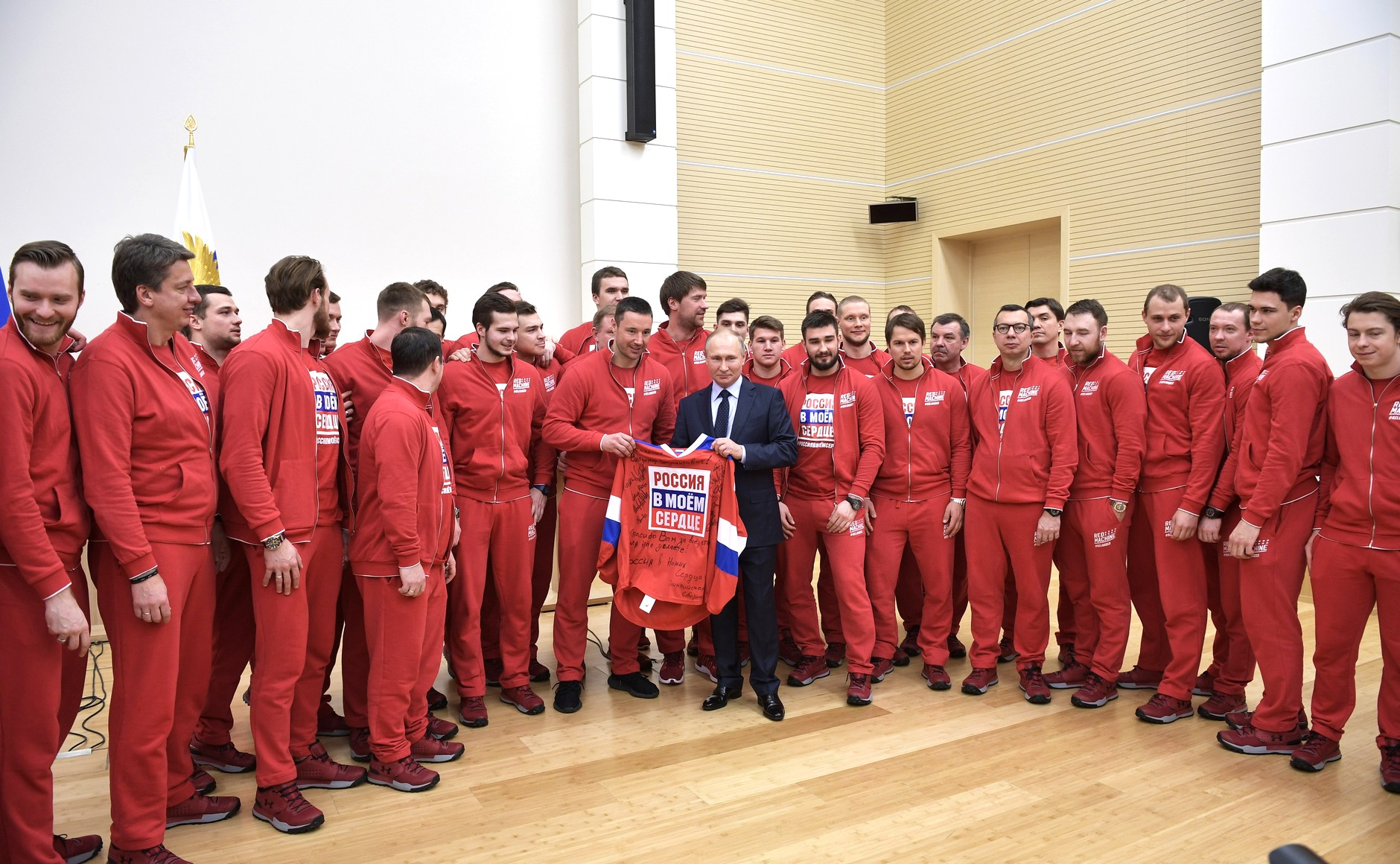
Russian ice hockey players present Putin a signed jersey, 31 January 2018

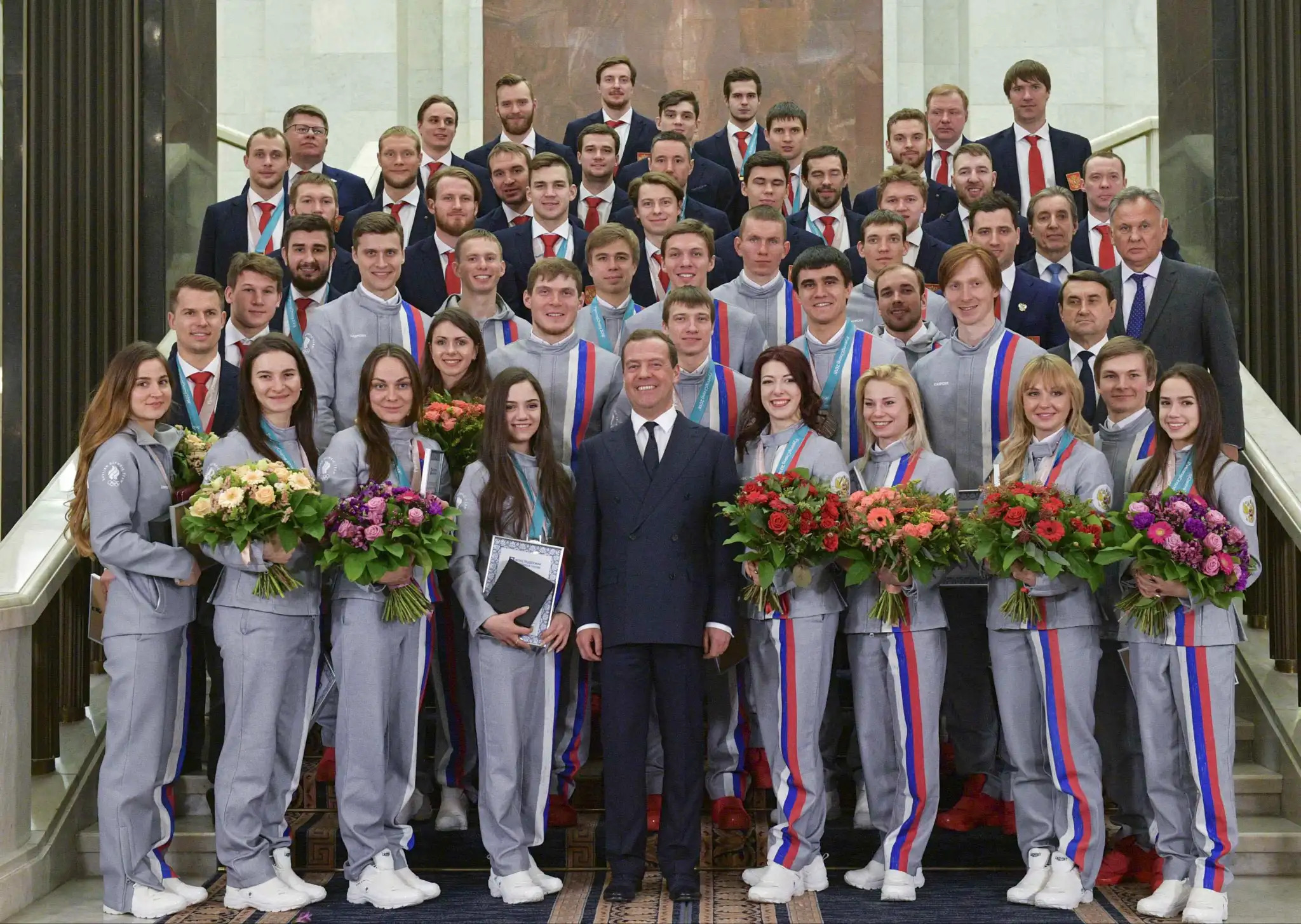
Russian Prime Minister Dmitry Medvedev with medal winners from Russia, 28 February 2018

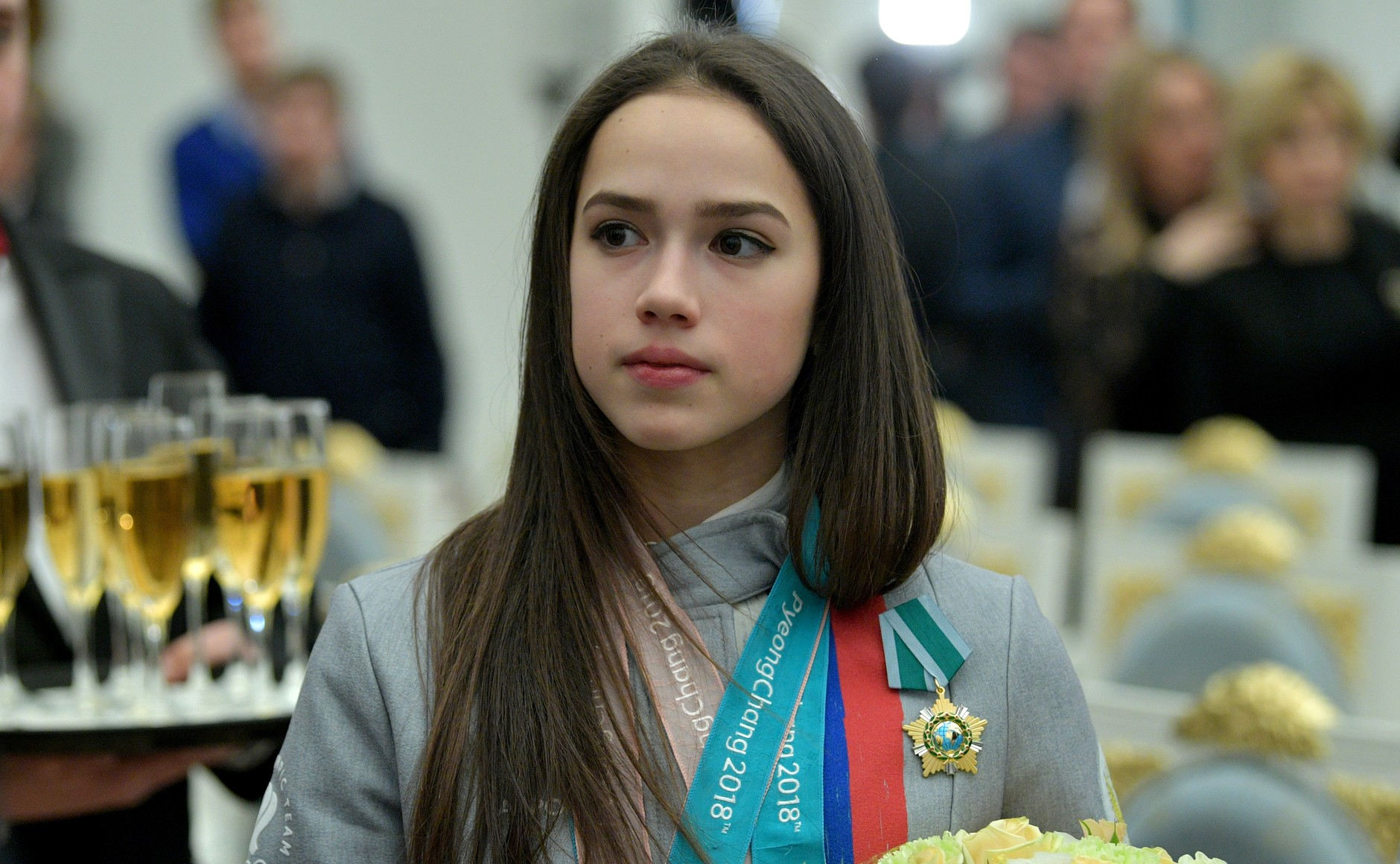
Alina Zagitova was awarded the Order of Friendship after the Games

In the past, the Russian president Vladimir Putin and other officials had stated that it would be an embarrassment for Russia if its athletes were not allowed to compete under the Russian flag. However, his spokesman later revealed that no boycott had actually been discussed prior to the IOC's decision. After the announcement, Ramzan Kadyrov, the head of Chechnya, announced that none of the Chechen athletes would be permitted to participate under a neutral flag.

On 6 December, Putin stated that his government were prepared to allow Russian athletes to compete at the Games as individuals, but there were still calls from other Russian politicians for a boycott. Gennady Zyuganov, leader of the Communist Party of the Russian Federation, proposed to send fans to the Games with a Soviet Victory Banner. Sergey Lavrov, the Russian Minister of Foreign Affairs, suggested that the United States "fears honest competition"; while Vladimir Putin was of the opinion that the United States had used its influence within the IOC to "orchestrate the doping scandal". He called the IOC decision an unfair "collective punishment", saying "It all looks like an absolutely orchestrated and politically motivated decision. For me, there are no doubts about this."

The popular Russian newspaper Komsomolskaya Pravda reported that 86% of Russians opposed participating in the Olympics under a neutral flag, and many Russian fans attended the Games wearing the Russian colours and chanting "Russia!" in unison, in an act of defiance against the ban. After the games, Russian figure skater Evgenia Medvedeva revealed in an Instagram post that the Russian tricolor was hidden on the OAR medal ceremony uniforms underneath a white fur scarf buttoned on the front of the jacket.

==== Criticism ====
The International Ice Hockey Federation voiced support for allowing the full participation of "all clean Russian athletes" in the 2018 Winter Games, calling on the IOC to refrain from imposing "collective punishment".

The IOC's decision was heavily criticized by Jack Robertson, who was primary investigator of the Russian doping program on behalf of WADA. Robertson argued that the IOC had issued "a non-punitive punishment meant to save face while protecting the [IOC's] and Russia's commercial and political interests". He also highlighted the fact that Russian whistleblowers proved beyond doubt that "99 percent of [their] national-level teammates were doping". According to Robertson, "[WADA] has discovered that when a Russian athlete [reaches] the national level, he or she [has] no choice in the matter: [it is] either dope, or you're done". He added "There is currently no intelligence I have seen or heard about that indicates the state-sponsored doping program has ceased." It was also reported that Russian officials intensively lobbied US politicians in an apparent attempt to secure Dr. Grigory Rodchenkov's extradition to Russia (Rodchenkov being the main whistleblower).

The CAS decision to overturn the life bans of 28 Russian athletes and restore their medals was fiercely criticised by Olympic officials, including IOC president Thomas Bach who said the decision was "extremely disappointing and surprising". Whistleblower Rodchenkov's lawyer stated that "the CAS decision would allow doped athletes to escape without punishment", also that "[the CAS decision] provides yet another ill-gotten gain for the corrupt Russian doping system generally, and Putin specifically".

== Failed doping tests ==
Curler Alexander Krushelnitskiy failed his doping test after winning bronze in the mixed doubles curling as he tested positive for meldonium. This is a drug used for treating heart conditions such as angina, chronic heart failure, cardiomyopathy and other cardiovascular disorders. It has the effect of increasing blood flow and can lead to an improvement in endurance. Meldonium was placed on WADA's list of substances banned from use by athletes two years previously. He later received a four-year suspension. Norway was subsequently awarded the bronze medal for the mixed doubles curling event.

Nadezhda Sergeeva, a bobsleigh pilot, tested positive for trimetazidine, which is also included in WADA's list of banned substances. She placed 12th in the women's competition.

== Medalists ==
Medal	Name	Sport	Event	Date
Gold	Alina Zagitova	Figure skating	Ladies' singles	23 February
Gold	Russia men's national ice hockey team: Sergei Andronov; Alexander Barabanov; Pavel Datsyuk; Vladislav Gavrikov; Mikhail Grigorenko; Nikita Gusev; Ilya Kablukov; Sergey Kalinin; Kirill Kaprizov; Bogdan Kiselevich; Vasily Koshechkin; Ilya Kovalchuk; Alexey Marchenko; Sergei Mozyakin; Nikita Nesterov; Nikolai Prokhorkin; Igor Shestyorkin; Vadim Shipachyov; Sergei Shirokov; Ilya Sorokin; Ivan Telegin; Vyacheslav Voynov; Egor Yakovlev; Artyom Zub; Andrei Zubarev	Ice hockey	Men's tournament	25 February
Silver	Mikhail Kolyada; Evgenia Medvedeva; Alina Zagitova; Evgenia Tarasova; Vladimir Morozov; Natalia Zabiiako; Alexander Enbert; Ekaterina Bobrova; Dmitri Soloviev	Figure skating	Team event	12 February
Silver	Nikita Tregubov	Skeleton	Men's	16 February
Silver	Aleksandr Bolshunov; Aleksey Chervotkin; Andrey Larkov; Denis Spitsov	Cross-country skiing	Men's 4 × 10 km relay	18 February
Silver	Aleksandr Bolshunov; Denis Spitsov	Cross-country skiing	Men's team sprint	21 February
Silver	Evgenia Medvedeva	Figure skating	Ladies' singles	23 February
Silver	Aleksandr Bolshunov	Cross-country skiing	Men's 50 km classical	24 February
Bronze	Semion Elistratov	Short track speed skating	Men's 1500 metres	10 February
Bronze	Yulia Belorukova	Cross-country skiing	Women's sprint	13 February
Bronze	Aleksandr Bolshunov	Cross-country skiing	Men's sprint	13 February
Bronze	Denis Spitsov	Cross-country skiing	Men's 15 km freestyle	16 February
Bronze	Natalya Voronina	Speed skating	Women's 5000 m	16 February
Bronze	Yulia Belorukova; Anna Nechaevskaya; Natalia Nepryaeva; Anastasia Sedova	Cross-country skiing	Women's 4 × 5 km relay	17 February
Bronze	Ilya Burov	Freestyle skiing	Men's aerials	18 February
Bronze	Sergey Ridzik	Freestyle skiing	Men's ski cross	21 February
Bronze	Andrey Larkov	Cross-country skiing	Men's 50 km classical	24 February

Medals by sport
Sport	1st place, gold medalist(s)	2nd place, silver medalist(s)	3rd place, bronze medalist(s)	Total
Figure skating	1	2	0	3
Ice hockey	1	0	0	1
Cross-country skiing	0	3	5	8
Skeleton	0	1	0	1
Freestyle skiing	0	0	2	2
Short track speed skating	0	0	1	1
Speed skating	0	0	1	1
Total	2	6	9	17

Medals by date
Day	Date	1st place, gold medalist(s)	2nd place, silver medalist(s)	3rd place, bronze medalist(s)	Total
Day 1	10 February	0	0	1	1
Day 2	11 February	0	0	0	0
Day 3	12 February	0	1	0	1
Day 4	13 February	0	0	2	2
Day 5	14 February	0	0	0	0
Day 6	15 February	0	0	0	0
Day 7	16 February	0	1	2	3
Day 8	17 February	0	0	1	1
Day 9	18 February	0	1	1	2
Day 10	19 February	0	0	0	0
Day 11	20 February	0	0	0	0
Day 12	21 February	0	1	1	2
Day 13	22 February	0	0	0	0
Day 14	23 February	1	1	0	2
Day 15	24 February	0	1	1	2
Day 16	25 February	1	0	0	1
Total		2	6	9	17

Medals by gender
Gender	1st place, gold medalist(s)	2nd place, silver medalist(s)	3rd place, bronze medalist(s)	Total	Percentage
Female	1	1	3	5	29.4%
Male	1	4	6	11	64.7%
Mixed	0	1	0	1	5.9%
Total	2	6	9	17	100%

== Competitors ==
The following is the list of number of competitors that could participate at the Games per sport/discipline.

Sport	Men	Women	Total
Alpine skiing	3	2	5
Biathlon	2	2	4
Bobsleigh	6	4	10
Cross-country skiing	7	5	12
Curling	1	6	7
Figure skating	7	8	15
Freestyle skiing	10	12	22
Ice hockey	25	23	48
Luge	7	1	8
Nordic combined	1	0	1
Short track speed skating	3	4	7
Skeleton	2	0	2
Ski jumping	4	4	8
Snowboarding	9	7	16
Speed skating	1	2	3
Total	88	80	168

== Alpine skiing ==
Russia has qualified three male and two female skiers.

Athlete	Event	Run 1		Run 2		Total	
Athlete	Event	Time	Rank	Time	Rank	Time	Rank
Aleksandr Khoroshilov	Men's slalom	49.72	21	51.01	5	1:40.73	17
Ivan Kuznetsov	Men's slalom	DNF					
Ivan Kuznetsov	Men's giant slalom	DNF					
Pavel Trikhichev	Men's combined	DNF					
Anastasiia Silanteva	Women's giant slalom	1:15.67	32	1:12.28	29	2:27.95	30
Ekaterina Tkachenko	Women's slalom	53.22	34	53.33	33	1:46.55	32

Mixed

Athlete	Event	Round of 16	Quarterfinals	Semifinals	Final / BM	
Athlete	Event	Opposition Result	Opposition Result	Opposition Result	Opposition Result	Rank
Aleksandr Khoroshilov; Ivan Kuznetsov; Anastasiia Silanteva; Ekaterina Tkachenko	Team	Norway; L 0–4	did not advance			

== Biathlon ==
Based on their Nations Cup rankings in the 2016–17 Biathlon World Cup, Russia has qualified 6 men and 5 women. However, the IOC only invited 2 men and 2 women.

Athlete	Event	Time	Misses	Rank
Anton Babikov	Men's sprint	25:48.5	4 (3+1)	57
Anton Babikov	Men's pursuit	37:21.8	4 (1+1+2+0)	40
Anton Babikov	Men's individual	50:08.0	1 (0+0+1+0)	16
Matvey Eliseev	Men's sprint	26:59.3	5 (3+2)	83
Matvey Eliseev	Men's individual	51:07.1	3 (0+2+0+1)	28
Tatiana Akimova	Women's sprint	22:24.2	0 (0+0)	20
Tatiana Akimova	Women's pursuit	33:50.8	4 (1+1+0+2)	31
Tatiana Akimova	Women's individual	44:17.6	2 (0+1+0+1)	15
Tatiana Akimova	Women's mass start	41:32.4	6 (0+0+5+1)	30
Uliana Kaisheva	Women's sprint	22:58.5	2 (1+1)	33
Uliana Kaisheva	Women's pursuit	36:33.6	5 (0+2+2+1)	52
Uliana Kaisheva	Women's individual	44:47.9	2 (0+2+0+0)	24
Anton Babikov; Matvey Eliseev; Tatiana Akimova; Uliana Kaisheva	Mixed relay	1:10:49.1	0+6 0+4	9

== Bobsleigh ==
Based on their rankings in the 2017–18 Bobsleigh World Cup, Russia has qualified 6 sleds.

Men

Athlete	Event	Run 1		Run 2		Run 3		Run 4		Total	
Athlete	Event	Time	Rank	Time	Rank	Time	Rank	Time	Rank	Time	Rank
Maxim Andrianov*; Yury Selikhov	Two-man	50.27	28	50.58	29	49.98	26	Eliminated		2:30.83	28
Vasiliy Kondratenko; Alexey Stulnev*	Two-man	49.77	19	49.99	20	49.74	20	49.87	20	3:19.37	20
Maxim Andrianov*; Ruslan Samitov; Yury Selikhov; Alexey Zaitsev	Four-man	49.43	18	49.39	12	49.56	15	49.56	4	3:17.94	15

Women

Athlete	Event	Run 1		Run 2		Run 3		Run 4		Total	
Athlete	Event	Time	Rank	Time	Rank	Time	Rank	Time	Rank	Time	Rank
Yulia Belomestnykh; Aleksandra Rodionova*	Two-woman	51.29	17	51.47	17	51.41	15	51.55	17	3:25.72	17
Anastasia Kocherzhova; Nadezhda Sergeeva*	Two-woman	51.01	10	51.49	18	51.29	12	51.37	14	~~3:25.16~~	DSQ (12)

* – Denotes the driver of each sled

== Cross-country skiing ==
Russia qualified 12 athletes, seven male and five female.

Distance
Men

Athlete	Event	Classical		Freestyle		Final		
Athlete	Event	Time	Rank	Time	Rank	Time	Deficit	Rank
Aleksandr Bolshunov	50 km classical	—N/a				2:08:40.8	+18.7	2nd place, silver medalist(s)
Aleksey Chervotkin	50 km classical	—N/a				2:13:19.0	+4:56.9	12
Andrey Larkov	15 km freestyle	—N/a				35:25.1	+1:41.2	20
Andrey Larkov	30 km skiathlon	41:37.5	31	36:38.0	29	1:18:50.6	+2:30.6	30
Andrey Larkov	50 km classical	—N/a				2:10:59.6	+2:37.5	3rd place, bronze medalist(s)
Andrey Melnichenko	15 km freestyle	—N/a				35:02.1	+1:18.2	14
Andrey Melnichenko	30 km skiathlon	41:46.4	32	36:30.1	24	1:18:50.5	+2:30.5	29
Denis Spitsov	15 km freestyle	—N/a				34:06.9	+23.0	3rd place, bronze medalist(s)
Denis Spitsov	30 km skiathlon	40:35.0	13	35:26.5	3	1:16:32.7	+12.7	4
Denis Spitsov	50 km classical	—N/a				2:16:24.6	+8:02.5	20
Alexey Vitsenko	15 km freestyle	—N/a				36:46.4	+3:02.5	49
Alexey Vitsenko	30 km skiathlon	41:09.2	20	36:20.6	22	1:18:02.2	+1:42.2	23
Aleksandr Bolshunov; Aleksey Chervotkin; Andrey Larkov; Denis Spitsov	4 × 10 km relay	—N/a				1:33:14.3	+9.4	2nd place, silver medalist(s)

Women

Athlete	Event	Classical		Freestyle		Final		
Athlete	Event	Time	Rank	Time	Rank	Time	Deficit	Rank
Yulia Belorukova	15 km skiathlon	22:02.5	22	20:15.9	22	42:51.0	+2:06.1	18
Anna Nechaevskaya	10 km freestyle	—N/a				26:24.8	+1:24.3	10
Natalia Nepryaeva	15 km skiathlon	21:28.2	11	19:21.6	8	41:17.9	+33.0	8
Natalia Nepryaeva	30 km classical	—N/a				1:32:10.4	+9:52.8	24
Anastasia Sedova	10 km freestyle	—N/a				26:07.8	+1:07.3	8
Anastasia Sedova	15 km skiathlon	21:43.8	19	19:43.2	12	41:57.7	+1:12.8	12
Anastasia Sedova	30 km classical	—N/a				1:26:46.8	+4:29.2	11
Alisa Zhambalova	10 km freestyle	—N/a				26:57.8	+1:57.3	17
Alisa Zhambalova	15 km skiathlon	22:34.9	28	19:51.9	15	42:59.1	+2:14.2	21
Alisa Zhambalova	30 km classical	—N/a				1:27:27.2	+5:09.6	15
Yulia Belorukova; Anna Nechaevskaya; Natalia Nepryaeva; Anastasia Sedova	4 × 5 km relay	—N/a				52:07.6	+43.3	3rd place, bronze medalist(s)

Sprint
Men

Athlete	Event	Qualification		Quarterfinal		Semifinal		Final	
Athlete	Event	Total	Rank	Total	Rank	Total	Rank	Total	Rank
Aleksandr Bolshunov	Sprint	3:10.20	3 Q	3:08.45	1 Q	3:06.63	3 q	3:07.11	3rd place, bronze medalist(s)
Andrey Melnichenko	Sprint	3:22.27	48	did not advance					
Alexander Panzhinskiy	Sprint	3:11.63	6 Q	3:11.15	4 q	3:19.05	6	did not advance	
Alexey Vitsenko	Sprint	3:14.56	14 Q	3:30.72	5	did not advance			
Aleksandr Bolshunov; Denis Spitsov	Team sprint	—N/a				15:58.84	1 Q	15:57.97	2nd place, silver medalist(s)

Women

Athlete	Event	Qualification		Quarterfinal		Semifinal		Final	
Athlete	Event	Total	Rank	Total	Rank	Total	Rank	Total	Rank
Yulia Belorukova	Sprint	3:18.26	15 Q	3:14.29	1 Q	3:10.12	1 Q	3:07.21	3rd place, bronze medalist(s)
Natalia Nepryaeva	Sprint	3:15.65	6 Q	3:11.78	1 Q	3:10.72	3 q	3:12.98	4
Alisa Zhambalova	Sprint	3:31.53	44	did not advance					
Yulia Belorukova; Natalia Nepryaeva	Team sprint	—N/a				16:24.63	3 q	16:41.76	9

== Curling ==
Summary

Team	Event	Group stage										Tiebreaker	Semifinal	Final / BM	
Team	Event	Opposition Score	Opposition Score	Opposition Score	Opposition Score	Opposition Score	Opposition Score	Opposition Score	Opposition Score	Opposition Score	Rank	Opposition Score	Opposition Score	Opposition Score	Rank
Victoria Moiseeva; Uliana Vasilyeva; Galina Arsenkina; Julia Guzieva; Yulia Portunova	Women's tournament	(United Kingdom) GBR; L 3–10	(China) CHN; W 7–6	(Sweden) SWE; L 4–5	(United States) USA; L 6–7	(Japan) JPN; L 5–10	(Switzerland) SUI; L 2–11	(Denmark) DEN; W 8–7	(South Korea) KOR; L 2–11	(Canada) CAN; L 8–9	9	did not advance			
Anastasia Bryzgalova; Alexander Krushelnitskiy	Mixed doubles	(United States) USA; L 3–9	(Norway) NOR; W 4–3	(Finland) FIN; W 7–5	(China) CHN; W 6–5	(South Korea) KOR; W 6–5	(Canada) CAN; L 2–8	(Switzerland) SUI; L 8–9	—N/a		3 Q	BYE	(Switzerland) SUI; L 5–7	(Norway) NOR; L (DSQ)	DSQ

=== Women's ===
Russia has qualified their women's team (five athletes), by finishing in the top seven teams in Olympic Qualification points. The representatives were determined at the 2017 Russian Olympic Curling Trials.

The Russian team consists of Victoria Moiseeva, Uliana Vasilyeva, Galina Arsenkina, Julia Guzieva, and Yulia Portunova.

Final round robin standings
Team	Skip	Pld	W	L	PF	PA	EW	EL	BE	SE	S%	Qualification
South Korea	Kim Eun-jung	9	8	1	75	44	41	34	5	15	79%	Playoffs
Sweden	Anna Hasselborg	9	7	2	64	48	42	34	14	13	83%	Playoffs
Great Britain	Eve Muirhead	9	6	3	61	56	39	38	12	6	79%	Playoffs
Japan	Satsuki Fujisawa	9	5	4	59	55	38	36	10	13	75%	Playoffs
China	Wang Bingyu	9	4	5	57	65	35	38	12	5	78%	
Canada	Rachel Homan	9	4	5	68	59	40	36	10	12	81%	
Switzerland	Silvana Tirinzoni	9	4	5	60	55	34	37	12	7	78%	
United States	Nina Roth	9	4	5	56	65	38	39	7	6	78%	
Olympic Athletes from Russia	Victoria Moiseeva	9	2	7	45	76	34	40	8	6	76%	
Denmark	Madeleine Dupont	9	1	8	50	72	32	41	10	6	73%	

Round-robin

The Olympic Athletes from Russia team has a bye in draws 3, 7 and 10.

Draw 1

Wednesday, 14 February, 14:05

Sheet B	1	2	3	4	5	6	7	8	9	10	Final
Olympic Athletes from Russia (Moiseeva)	0	1	0	0	2	0	0	X	X	X	3
Great Britain (Muirhead) 🔨	3	0	2	1	0	0	4	X	X	X	10

Draw 2

Thursday, 15 February, 09:05

Sheet C	1	2	3	4	5	6	7	8	9	10	11	Final
China (Wang)	0	2	1	0	0	1	0	2	0	0	0	6
Olympic Athletes from Russia (Moiseeva) 🔨	1	0	0	2	0	0	1	0	0	2	1	7

Draw 4

Friday, 16 February, 14:05

Sheet D	1	2	3	4	5	6	7	8	9	10	11	Final
Sweden (Hasselborg)	0	0	0	0	1	0	1	0	2	0	1	5
Olympic Athletes from Russia (Moiseeva) 🔨	0	0	0	1	0	1	0	1	0	1	0	4

Draw 5

Saturday, 17 February, 09:05

Sheet B	1	2	3	4	5	6	7	8	9	10	11	Final
Olympic Athletes from Russia (Moiseeva)	0	2	0	0	1	1	0	1	0	1	0	6
United States (Roth) 🔨	1	0	2	1	0	0	1	0	1	0	1	7

Draw 6

Saturday, 17 February, 20:05

Sheet A	1	2	3	4	5	6	7	8	9	10	Final
Olympic Athletes from Russia (Moiseeva) 🔨	1	0	2	0	1	0	0	1	0	X	5
Japan (Fujisawa)	0	2	0	2	0	1	3	0	2	X	10

Draw 8

Monday, 19 February, 09:05

Sheet D	1	2	3	4	5	6	7	8	9	10	Final
Olympic Athletes from Russia (Moiseeva)	0	1	0	0	0	1	0	X	X	X	2
Switzerland (Tirinzoni) 🔨	0	0	3	2	2	0	4	X	X	X	11

Draw 9

Monday, 19 February, 20:05

Sheet B	1	2	3	4	5	6	7	8	9	10	Final
Denmark (Dupont)	0	0	0	2	0	2	0	0	3	0	7
Olympic Athletes from Russia (Moiseeva) 🔨	0	1	1	0	3	0	1	1	0	1	8

Draw 11

Wednesday, 21 February, 09:05

Sheet A	1	2	3	4	5	6	7	8	9	10	Final
South Korea (Kim)	3	3	3	0	2	0	X	X	X	X	11
Olympic Athletes from Russia (Moiseeva) 🔨	0	0	0	1	0	1	X	X	X	X	2

Draw 12

Wednesday, 21 February, 20:05

Sheet C	1	2	3	4	5	6	7	8	9	10	Final
Olympic Athletes from Russia (Moiseeva) 🔨	4	0	1	0	0	0	2	1	0	0	8
Canada (Homan)	0	2	0	2	1	1	0	0	2	1	9

=== Mixed doubles ===
Russia has qualified a mixed doubles team by earning enough points in the last two World Mixed Doubles Curling Championships.

There were no trials as the team was chosen by the Russian Olympic Committee.

The Olympic Athletes from Russia team won the mixed doubles bronze medal game against Norway, but due to a positive testing of meldonium from Alexander Krushelnitskiy, their bronze medals were stripped and given to Norway.

Final round robin standings
Team	Athletes	Pld	W	L	PF	PA	EW	EL	BE	SE	S%	Qualification
Canada	Kaitlyn Lawes / John Morris	7	6	1	52	26	28	20	0	9	80%	Playoffs
Switzerland	Jenny Perret / Martin Rios	7	5	2	45	40	29	26	0	10	71%	Playoffs
Olympic Athletes from Russia	Anastasia Bryzgalova / Alexander Krushelnitskiy	7	4	3	36	44	26	27	1	7	67%	Playoffs
Norway	Kristin Skaslien / Magnus Nedregotten	7	4	3	39	43	26	25	1	8	74%	Tiebreaker
China	Wang Rui / Ba Dexin	7	4	3	47	42	27	27	1	6	72%	Tiebreaker
South Korea	Jang Hye-ji / Lee Ki-jeong	7	2	5	40	40	23	29	1	7	67%	
United States	Rebecca Hamilton / Matt Hamilton	7	2	5	37	43	26	25	0	9	74%	
Finland	Oona Kauste / Tomi Rantamäki	7	1	6	35	53	23	29	0	6	67%	

Draw 1

Thursday, February 8, 9:05

Sheet A	1	2	3	4	5	6	7	8	Final
United States (R. Hamilton / M. Hamilton) 🔨	3	0	1	1	2	0	2	X	9
Olympic Athletes from Russia (Bryzgalova / Krushelnitskiy)	0	2	0	0	0	1	0	X	3

Draw 2

Thursday, February 8, 20:04

Sheet C	1	2	3	4	5	6	7	8	Final
Olympic Athletes from Russia (Bryzgalova / Krushelnitskiy)	0	1	0	1	1	0	0	1	4
Norway (Skaslien / Nedregotten) 🔨	0	0	1	0	0	1	1	0	3

Draw 3

Friday, February 9, 8:35

Sheet D	1	2	3	4	5	6	7	8	Final
Olympic Athletes from Russia (Bryzgalova / Krushelnitskiy)	0	0	4	0	1	2	0	X	7
Finland (Kauste / Rantamäki) 🔨	2	1	0	1	0	0	1	X	5

Draw 4

Friday, February 9, 13:35

Sheet B	1	2	3	4	5	6	7	8	9	Final
China (Wang / Ba)	0	0	0	3	0	0	1	1	0	5
Olympic Athletes from Russia (Bryzgalova / Krushelnitskiy) 🔨	1	1	1	0	1	1	0	0	1	6

Draw 5

Saturday, February 10, 9:05

Sheet D	1	2	3	4	5	6	7	8	9	Final
South Korea (Jang / Lee)	1	0	1	0	0	1	0	2	0	5
Olympic Athletes from Russia (Bryzgalova / Krushelnitskiy) 🔨	0	1	0	2	1	0	1	0	1	6

Draw 6

Saturday, February 10, 20:04

Sheet A	1	2	3	4	5	6	7	8	Final
Olympic Athletes from Russia (Bryzgalova / Krushelnitskiy)	0	0	1	0	1	0	X	X	2
Canada (Lawes / Morris) 🔨	3	1	0	2	0	2	X	X	8

Draw 7

Sunday, February 11, 9:05

Sheet C	1	2	3	4	5	6	7	8	Final
Switzerland (Perret / Rios) 🔨	0	2	0	0	2	2	0	3	9
Olympic Athletes from Russia (Bryzgalova / Krushelnitskiy)	2	0	4	1	0	0	1	0	8

Semifinal

Monday, February 12, 20:05

Sheet C	1	2	3	4	5	6	7	8	Final
Olympic Athletes from Russia (Bryzgalova / Krushelnitskiy)	0	2	0	0	2	1	0	0	5
Switzerland (Perret / Rios) 🔨	2	0	1	1	0	0	2	1	7

Bronze Medal Game

Tuesday, February 13, 9:05

Sheet B	1	2	3	4	5	6	7	8	Final
Olympic Athletes from Russia (Bryzgalova / Krushelnitskiy) 🔨	2	1	0	2	0	1	1	1	DSQ
Norway (Skaslien / Nedregotten)	0	0	2	0	2	0	0	0	W

Notes

- Olympic Athletes from Russia (which won the bronze medal match 8–4) were disqualified after the tournament due to the doping case.

== Figure skating ==
Russia qualified 15 figure skaters (7 male, 8 female), based on its placement at the 2017 World Figure Skating Championships in Helsinki, Finland.

Individual

Athlete	Event	SP		FS		Total	
Athlete	Event	Points	Rank	Points	Rank	Points	Rank
Dmitri Aliev	Men's singles	98.98	5 Q	168.53	13	267.51	7
Mikhail Kolyada	Men's singles	86.69	8 Q	177.56	7	264.25	8
Evgenia Medvedeva	Ladies' singles	81.61	2 Q	156.65	1	238.26	2nd place, silver medalist(s)
Maria Sotskova	Ladies' singles	63.86	12 Q	134.24	7	198.10	8
Alina Zagitova	Ladies' singles	82.92 WR	1 Q	156.65	2	239.57	1st place, gold medalist(s)

Mixed

Athlete	Event	SP / SD		FS / FD		Total	
Athlete	Event	Points	Rank	Points	Rank	Points	Rank
Kristina Astakhova / Alexei Rogonov	Pairs	70.52	10 Q	123.93	13	194.45	12
Evgenia Tarasova / Vladimir Morozov	Pairs	81.68	2 Q	143.25	4	224.93	4
Natalia Zabiiako / Alexander Enbert	Pairs	74.35	8 Q	138.53	7	212.88	7
Ekaterina Bobrova / Dmitri Soloviev	Ice dancing	75.47	6 Q	111.45	4	186.92	5
Tiffany Zahorski / Jonathan Guerreiro	Ice dancing	66.47	13 Q	95.77	14	162.24	13

Team event

Athlete	Event	Short program/Short dance						Free skate/Free dance					
Athlete	Event	Men's	Ladies'	Pairs	Ice dance	Total		Men's	Ladies'	Pairs	Ice dance	Total	
Athlete	Event	Points Team points	Points Team points	Points Team points	Points Team points	Points	Rank	Points Team points	Points Team points	Points Team points	Points Team points	Points	Rank
Mikhail Kolyada (M); Evgenia Medvedeva (L) (SP); Evgenia Tarasova / Vladimir Morozov (P) (SP); Ekaterina Bobrova / Dmitri Soloviev (ID); Natalia Zabiiako / Alexander Enbert (P) (FS); Alina Zagitova (L) (FS)	Team event	74.36; 3	81.06; WR; 10	80.92; 10	74.76; 8	31	2 Q	173.57; 9	158.08; 10	133.28; 8	110.43; 8	66	2nd place, silver medalist(s)

== Freestyle skiing ==
Aerials

Athlete	Event	Qualification				Final					
Athlete	Event	Jump 1		Jump 2		Jump 1		Jump 2		Jump 3	
Athlete	Event	Points	Rank	Points	Rank	Points	Rank	Points	Rank	Points	Rank
Ilya Burov	Men's aerials	123.98	8	126.55	1 Q	122.13	6 Q	123.53	6 Q	122.17	3rd place, bronze medalist(s)
Maxim Burov	Men's aerials	117.65	12	116.37	9	did not advance					
Pavel Krotov	Men's aerials	124.89	5 QF	Bye		126.11	2 Q	124.89	5 Q	103.17	4
Stanislav Nikitin	Men's aerials	70.59	25	111.06	12	did not advance					
Alina Gridneva	Women's aerials	60.16	20	60.98	15	did not advance					
Liubov Nikitina	Women's aerials	88.83	8	84.24	4 Q	85.68	7 Q	80.01	7	did not advance	
Alexandra Orlova	Women's aerials	102.22	1 QF	Bye		89.28	5 Q	61.25	8	did not advance	
Kristina Spiridonova	Women's aerials	97.64	4 QF	Bye		57.64	11	did not advance			

Halfpipe

Athlete	Event	Qualification				Final				
Athlete	Event	Run 1	Run 2	Best	Rank	Run 1	Run 2	Run 3	Best	Rank
Pavel Chupa	Men's halfpipe	46.80	25.80	46.80	24	did not advance				
Valeriya Demidova	Women's halfpipe	71.00	73.60	73.60	10 Q	79.00	80.60	77.60	80.60	6

Moguls

Athlete	Event	Qualification								Final											
Athlete	Event	Run 1				Run 2				Run 1				Run 2				Run 3			
Athlete	Event	Time	Points	Total	Rank	Time	Points	Total	Rank	Time	Points	Total	Rank	Time	Points	Total	Rank	Time	Points	Total	Rank
Alexandr Smyshlyaev	Men's moguls	24.78	65.61	83.93	2 Q	Bye				25.49	60.18	74.57	15	did not advance							
Marika Pertakhiya	Women's moguls	30.37	56.65	70.43	12	36.98	24.59	30.92	7 Q	30.52	58.04	71.65	16	did not advance							
Regina Rakhimova	Women's moguls	31.74	59.54	71.77	11	31.95	60.82	72.82	4 Q	30.92	60.42	73.58	11 Q	30.87	60.34	73.55	10	did not advance			
Ekaterina Stolyarova	Women's moguls	30.82	54.42	67.69	20	30.63	59.92	73.40	2 Q	30.52	59.62	73.23	12 Q	30.48	59.09	72.74	11	did not advance			

Ski cross

Athlete	Event	Seeding		1/8 final	Quarterfinal	Semifinal	Final	
Athlete	Event	Time	Rank	Position	Position	Position	Position	Rank
Semen Denshchikov	Men's ski cross	1:10.86	27	2 Q	3	did not advance		
Egor Korotkov	Men's ski cross	1:10.39	23	4	did not advance			
Igor Omelin	Men's ski cross	1:10.24	17	3	did not advance			
Sergey Ridzik	Men's ski cross	1:09.21	2	2 Q	1 Q	2 FA	3	3rd place, bronze medalist(s)
Anastasiia Chirtcova	Women's ski cross	1:15.83	15	2 Q	DNF	did not advance		
Victoria Zavadovskaya	Women's ski cross	1:16.80	19	3	did not advance			

Qualification legend: FA – Qualify to medal round; FB – Qualify to consolation round

Slopestyle

Athlete	Event	Qualification				Final				
Athlete	Event	Run 1	Run 2	Best	Rank	Run 1	Run 2	Run 3	Best	Rank
Lana Prusakova	Women's slopestyle	42.20	70.60	70.60	14	did not advance				
Anastasia Tatalina	Women's slopestyle	27.40	81.00	81.00	8 Q	29.30	51.20	13.00	51.20	12

== Ice hockey ==
Summary

Key:

- OT – Overtime
- GWS – Match decided by penalty-shootout

Team	Event	Group stage				Qualification playoff	Quarterfinal	Semifinal / Pl.	Final / BM / Pl.	
Team	Event	Opposition Score	Opposition Score	Opposition Score	Rank	Opposition Score	Opposition Score	Opposition Score	Opposition Score	Rank
Olympic Athletes from Russia	Men's tournament	Slovakia; L 2–3	Slovenia; W 8–2	United States; W 4–0	1 QQ	Bye	Norway; W 6–1	Czech Republic; W 3–0	Germany; W 4–3 OT	1st place, gold medalist(s)
Olympic Athletes from Russia	Women's tournament	Canada; L 0–5	United States; L 0–5	Finland; L 1–5	4	—N/a	Switzerland; W 6–2	Canada; L 0–5	Finland; L 2–3	4

=== Men's tournament ===
Russia men's national ice hockey team qualified by finishing second in the 2015 IIHF World Ranking.

In the first Olympics since 1994 that did not feature any active NHL players, the Olympic Athletes from Russia (OAR) team, consisting primarily of SKA and CSKA players of a Russia-based KHL and featuring ex-NHL all-stars Pavel Datsyuk, Ilya Kovalchuk and Vyacheslav Voynov (all SKA), won the gold medal, after a 4–3 overtime victory over the German team in the final. In its post-Olympics World Ranking, the IIHF counted this as a result for the Russian team. The IIHF considers this victory to be Russia's second gold medal in the Olympics, as they also attributed the 1992 Unified Team gold medal to Russia. However, the IOC attributes neither of those results to Russia.

After they return to Moscow, the entire Russian gold medal-winning team and other Olympic medalists participated in a Vladimir Putin's presidential rally, where they sang the Russian anthem.

Team roster

The following is the Olympic Athletes from Russia roster for the men's ice hockey tournament at the 2018 Winter Olympics.

Head coach: (Russia) Oleg Znarok Assistant coaches: (Latvia) Harijs Vītoliņš, (Russia) Rashit Davydov, (Russia) Igor Nikitin, (Russia) Alexei Zhamnov

No.	Pos.	Name	Height	Weight	Birthdate	Birthplace	2017–18 team
2	D	Artyom Zub	1.88 m (6 ft 2 in)	90 kg (198 lb)	3 October 1995	Khabarovsk	(Russia) SKA Saint Petersburg (KHL)
4	D	Vladislav Gavrikov	1.90 m (6 ft 3 in)	97 kg (214 lb)	21 November 1995	Yaroslavl	(Russia) SKA Saint Petersburg (KHL)
7	F	Ivan Telegin	1.93 m (6 ft 4 in)	90 kg (198 lb)	28 February 1992	Novokuznetsk	(Russia) HC CSKA Moscow (KHL)
10	F	Sergei Mozyakin	1.80 m (5 ft 11 in)	84 kg (185 lb)	30 March 1981	Yaroslavl, Russian SFSR, Soviet Union	(Russia) Metallurg Magnitogorsk (KHL)
11	F	Sergei Andronov – A	1.89 m (6 ft 2 in)	96 kg (212 lb)	19 July 1989	Penza, Russian SFSR, Soviet Union	(Russia) HC CSKA Moscow (KHL)
13	F	Pavel Datsyuk – C	1.82 m (6 ft 0 in)	86 kg (190 lb)	20 July 1978	Sverdlovsk, Russian SFSR, Soviet Union	(Russia) SKA Saint Petersburg (KHL)
21	F	Sergey Kalinin	1.90 m (6 ft 3 in)	86 kg (190 lb)	17 March 1991	Omsk, Russian SFSR, Soviet Union	(Russia) SKA Saint Petersburg (KHL)
25	F	Mikhail Grigorenko	1.91 m (6 ft 3 in)	91 kg (201 lb)	16 May 1994	Khabarovsk	(Russia) HC CSKA Moscow (KHL)
26	D	Vyacheslav Voynov	1.82 m (6 ft 0 in)	91 kg (201 lb)	15 January 1990	Chelyabinsk, Russian SFSR, Soviet Union	(Russia) SKA Saint Petersburg (KHL)
28	D	Andrei Zubarev	1.85 m (6 ft 1 in)	101 kg (223 lb)	3 March 1987	Ufa, Russian SFSR, Soviet Union	(Russia) SKA Saint Petersburg (KHL)
29	F	Ilya Kablukov	1.89 m (6 ft 2 in)	88 kg (194 lb)	18 January 1988	Moscow, Russian SFSR, Soviet Union	(Russia) SKA Saint Petersburg (KHL)
30	G	Igor Shestyorkin	1.86 m (6 ft 1 in)	86 kg (190 lb)	30 December 1995	Moscow	(Russia) SKA Saint Petersburg (KHL)
31	G	Ilya Sorokin	1.88 m (6 ft 2 in)	80 kg (176 lb)	4 August 1995	Mezhdurechensk	(Russia) HC CSKA Moscow (KHL)
44	D	Egor Yakovlev	1.82 m (6 ft 0 in)	87 kg (192 lb)	17 September 1991	Magnitogorsk, Russian SFSR, Soviet Union	(Russia) SKA Saint Petersburg (KHL)
52	F	Sergei Shirokov	1.79 m (5 ft 10 in)	89 kg (196 lb)	10 March 1986	Moscow, Russian SFSR, Soviet Union	(Russia) SKA Saint Petersburg (KHL)
53	D	Alexey Marchenko	1.88 m (6 ft 2 in)	96 kg (212 lb)	2 January 1992	Moscow	(Russia) HC CSKA Moscow (KHL)
55	D	Bogdan Kiselevich	1.84 m (6 ft 0 in)	94 kg (207 lb)	14 February 1990	Cherepovets, Russian SFSR, Soviet Union	(Russia) HC CSKA Moscow (KHL)
71	F	Ilya Kovalchuk – A	1.90 m (6 ft 3 in)	103 kg (227 lb)	15 April 1983	Kalinin, Russian SFSR, Soviet Union	(Russia) SKA Saint Petersburg (KHL)
74	F	Nikolai Prokhorkin	1.89 m (6 ft 2 in)	91 kg (201 lb)	17 September 1993	Chelyabinsk	(Russia) SKA Saint Petersburg (KHL)
77	F	Kirill Kaprizov	1.78 m (5 ft 10 in)	87 kg (192 lb)	26 April 1997	Novokuznetsk	(Russia) HC CSKA Moscow (KHL)
83	G	Vasily Koshechkin	2.00 m (6 ft 7 in)	110 kg (243 lb)	27 March 1983	Tolyatti, Russian SFSR, Soviet Union	(Russia) Metallurg Magnitogorsk (KHL)
87	F	Vadim Shipachyov	1.85 m (6 ft 1 in)	86 kg (190 lb)	12 March 1987	Cherepovets, Russian SFSR, Soviet Union	(Russia) SKA Saint Petersburg (KHL)
89	D	Nikita Nesterov	1.80 m (5 ft 11 in)	83 kg (183 lb)	28 March 1993	Chelyabinsk	(Russia) HC CSKA Moscow (KHL)
94	F	Alexander Barabanov	1.79 m (5 ft 10 in)	89 kg (196 lb)	17 June 1994	Saint Petersburg	(Russia) SKA Saint Petersburg (KHL)
97	F	Nikita Gusev	1.80 m (5 ft 11 in)	82 kg (181 lb)	8 July 1992	Moscow	(Russia) SKA Saint Petersburg (KHL)

Preliminary round

Pos	Team	Pld	W	OTW	OTL	L	GF	GA	GD	Pts	Qualification
1	Olympic Athletes from Russia	3	2	0	0	1	14	5	+9	6	Quarterfinals
2	Slovenia	3	0	2	0	1	8	12	−4	4 (Note: Slovenia 4 Pts; USA 4 Pts; Slovakia 1 Pts. Slovenia defeated USA 3–2 in overtime.)	Qualification playoffs
3	United States	3	1	0	1	1	4	8	−4	4	Qualification playoffs
4	Slovakia	3	1	0	1	1	6	7	−1	4	Qualification playoffs

Source: IIHF
Notes:

14 February 2018; 21:10	Slovakia	3–2 (2–2, 0–0, 1–0)	Olympic Athletes from Russia	Gangneung Hockey Centre, Pyeongchang; Attendance: 4,025

Game reference

Branislav Konrád
Goalies
Vasily Koshechkin
Referees:
(Canada) Brett Iverson
(Finland) Aleksi Rantala
Linesmen:
(Czech Republic) Vít Lederer
(Canada) Nathan Vanoosten

	0–1	02:54 – Gavrikov (Voinov, Shirokov)
	0–2	04:08 – Kaprizov (Gusev, Gavrikov)
Ölvecký (Graňák) – 16:05	1–2
Bakoš – 17:55	2–2
Čerešňák (Haščák, Bakoš) (PP) – 48:30	3–2

12 min
Penalties
10 min
19
Shots
22

16 February 2018; 16:40	Olympic Athletes from Russia	8–2 (2–0, 4–1, 2–1)	Slovenia	Gangneung Hockey Centre, Pyeongchang; Attendance: 6,018

Game reference

Vasily Koshechkin
Ilya Sorokin
Goalies
Luka Gračnar
Referees:
(United States) Mark Lemelin
(Switzerland) Daniel Stricker
Linesmen:
(Germany) Lukas Kohlmüller
(Finland) Hannu Sormunen

Mozyakin (Datsyuk, Gusev) (PP) – 18:23	1–0
Kovalchuk (Yakovlev, Andronov) – 18:45	2–0
Barabanov (Grigorenko, Kalinin) (PP) – 26:00	3–0
Kablukov (Kovalchuk, Zub) – 28:48	4–0
Kaprizov (Gusev, Kiselevich) – 30:02	5–0
	5–1	33:31 – Muršak (Verlič, Kuralt)
Kovalchuk (Kalinin, Andronov) – 37:16	6–1
Kaprizov (Datsyuk, Kiselevich) – 41:15	7–1
Kaprizov (Zub, Gusev) – 47:12	8–1
	8–2	59:27 – Pance

8 min
Penalties
6 min
34
Shots
15

17 February 2018; 21:10	Olympic Athletes from Russia	4–0 (1–0, 2–0, 1–0)	United States	Gangneung Hockey Centre, Pyeongchang; Attendance: 6,473

Game reference

Vasily Koshechkin
Goalies
Ryan Zapolski
Referees:
(Slovakia) Jozef Kubuš
(Sweden) Linus Öhlund
Linesmen:
(Czech Republic) Vít Lederer
(Switzerland) Nicolas Fluri

Prokhorkin (Mozyakin, Barabanov) – 07:21	1–0
Prokhorkin (Shirokov, Mozyakin) – 22:14	2–0
Kovalchuk (Andronov) – 39:59	3–0
Kovalchuk (Voynov, Andronov) – 40:28	4–0

10 min
Penalties
10 min
26
Shots
29

Quarterfinal

21 February 2018; 16:40	Olympic Athletes from Russia	6–1 (3–0, 2–1, 1–0)	Norway	Gangneung Hockey Centre, Pyeongchang; Attendance: 3,553

Game reference

Vasily Koshechkin
Goalies
Lars Haugen
Henrik Haukeland
Referees:
(Czech Republic) Jan Hribik
(United States) Timothy Mayer
Linesmen:
(Germany) Lukas Kohlmüller
(United States) Judson Ritter

Grigorenko (Kablukov, Telegin) – 08:54	1–0
Gusev (Mozyakin, Datsyuk) (PP) – 13:25	2–0
Voynov (Gusev, Kaprizov) – 19:20	3–0
	3–1	27:21 – Bonsaksen (M. Olimb, K.A. Olimb)
Kalinin (Kovalchuk, Voinov) (PP) – 28:35	4–1
Nesterov (Gusev, Datsyuk) (PP) – 33:06	5–1
Telegin (Grigorenko, Kablukov) – 53:15	6–1

10 min
Penalties
10 min
32
Shots
14

Semifinal

23 February 2018; 16:40	Czech Republic	0–3 (0–0, 0–2, 0–1)	Olympic Athletes from Russia	Gangneung Hockey Centre, Pyeongchang; Attendance: 4,330

Game reference

Pavel Francouz
Goalies
Vasily Koshechkin
Referees:
(Canada) Brett Iverson
(United States) Mark Lemelin
Linesmen:
(Sweden) Jimmy Dahmen
(Finland) Sakari Suominen

0–1	27:47 – Gusev (Datsyuk)
0–2	28:14 – Gavrikov (Telegin, Grigorenko)
0–3	59:39 – Kovalchuk (Zub, Zubarev) (ENG)

6 min
Penalties
10 min
31
Shots
22

Final

25 February 2018; 13:10	(gold) Olympic Athletes from Russia	4–3 OT (1–0, 0–1, 2–2) (OT 1–0)	Germany (silver)	Gangneung Hockey Centre, Gangneung; Attendance: 5,075

Game reference

Vasily Koshechkin
Goalies
Danny aus den Birken
Referees:
(United States) Mark Lemelin
(Finland) Aleksi Rantala
Linesmen:
(Sweden) Jimmy Dahmen
(Finland) Sakari Suominen

Voynov (Gusev, Kaprizov) – 19:59	1–0
	1–1	29:32 – Schütz (Macek, Hager)
Gusev (Kaprizov, Datsyuk) – 53:21	2–1
	2–2	53:31 – Kahun (Mauer, Ehliz)
	2–3	56:44 – J. Müller (Ehliz, Hördler)
Gusev (Zub, Kaprizov) (SH, EA) – 59:04	3–3
Kaprizov (Gusev, Voynov) (PP) – 69:40	4–3

4 min
Penalties
6 min
30
Shots
25

=== Women's tournament ===
Russia women's national ice hockey team qualified by finishing 4th in the 2016 IIHF World Ranking.

Team roster

The following is the Olympic Athletes from Russia roster for the women's ice hockey tournament at the 2018 Winter Olympics.

Head coach: (Russia) Alexei Chistyakov Assistant coach: (Russia) Alexander Vedernikov

No.	Pos.	Name	Height	Weight	Birthdate	Birthplace	2017–18 team
1	G	Valeria Tarakanova	1.83 m (6 ft 0 in)	89 kg (196 lb)	20 June 1998	Zavolzhye	(Russia) SKIF Nizhny Novgorod (RWHL)
2	D	Angelina Goncharenko	1.78 m (5 ft 10 in)	73 kg (161 lb)	23 May 1994	Moscow	(Russia) HC Tornado (RWHL)
10	F	Liudmila Belyakova	1.70 m (5 ft 7 in)	65 kg (143 lb)	12 August 1994	Moscow	(Russia) HC Tornado (RWHL)
11	D	Liana Ganeyeva	1.65 m (5 ft 5 in)	62 kg (137 lb)	20 December 1997	Staroe Baisarovo	(Russia) Arktik-Universitet Ukhta (RWHL)
12	D	Yekaterina Lobova	1.67 m (5 ft 6 in)	64 kg (141 lb)	25 October 1998	Novosibirsk	(Russia) Biryusa Krasnoyarsk (RWHL)
13	D	Nina Pirogova	1.73 m (5 ft 8 in)	68 kg (150 lb)	26 January 1999	Moscow	(Russia) HC Tornado (RWHL)
15	F	Valeria Pavlova	1.79 m (5 ft 10 in)	82 kg (181 lb)	15 April 1995	Tyumen	(Russia) Biryusa Krasnoyarsk (RWHL)
17	F	Fanuza Kadirova	1.62 m (5 ft 4 in)	58 kg (128 lb)	6 April 1998	Kukmor	(Russia) Arktik-Universitet Ukhta (RWHL)
18	F	Olga Sosina – C	1.63 m (5 ft 4 in)	75 kg (165 lb)	27 July 1992	Almetyevsk	(Russia) Agidel Ufa (RWHL)
22	D	Maria Batalova – A	1.73 m (5 ft 8 in)	67 kg (148 lb)	3 May 1996		(Russia) HC Tornado (RWHL)
28	F	Diana Kanayeva	1.72 m (5 ft 8 in)	63 kg (139 lb)	27 March 1997	Naberezhnye Chelny	(Russia) HC Dinamo Saint Petersburg (RWHL)
31	G	Nadezhda Alexandrova	1.72 m (5 ft 8 in)	63 kg (139 lb)	3 January 1986	Moscow, Soviet Union	(Russia) HC Tornado (RWHL)
34	D	Svetlana Tkacheva	1.69 m (5 ft 7 in)	56 kg (123 lb)	3 November 1984	Moscow, Soviet Union	(Russia) HC Tornado (RWHL)
43	F	Yekaterina Likhachyova	1.71 m (5 ft 7 in)	63 kg (139 lb)	24 August 1998	Kirovo-Chepetsk	(Russia) SKIF Nizhni Novgorod (RWHL)
44	F	Alyona Starovoitova	1.73 m (5 ft 8 in)	67 kg (148 lb)	22 October 1999	Moscow	(Russia) HC Tornado (RWHL)
59	F	Yelena Dergachyova – A	1.59 m (5 ft 3 in)	55 kg (121 lb)	8 November 1995	Moscow	(Russia) HC Tornado (RWHL)
68	F	Alevtina Shtaryova	1.73 m (5 ft 8 in)	67 kg (148 lb)	9 February 1997	Moscow	(Russia) HC Tornado
73	F	Viktoria Kulishova	1.70 m (5 ft 7 in)	60 kg (132 lb)	12 August 1999	Tyumen	(Russia) SKIF Nizhny Novgorod (RWHL)
76	D	Yekaterina Nikolayeva	1.67 m (5 ft 6 in)	65 kg (143 lb)	5 October 1995	Saratov	(Russia) HC Dinamo Saint Petersburg (RWHL)
88	F	Yekaterina Smolina	1.62 m (5 ft 4 in)	62 kg (137 lb)	8 October 1988	Ust-Kamenogorsk, Kazakh SSR, Soviet Union	(Russia) HC Dinamo Saint Petersburg (RWHL)
92	G	Nadezhda Morozova	1.70 m (5 ft 7 in)	85 kg (187 lb)	29 November 1996	Moscow	(Russia) Biryusa Krasnoyarsk (RWHL)
94	F	Yevgenia Dyupina	1.71 m (5 ft 7 in)	62 kg (137 lb)	30 June 1994	Glazov	(Russia) HC Dinamo Saint Petersburg (RWHL)
97	F	Anna Shokhina	1.70 m (5 ft 7 in)	69 kg (152 lb)	23 June 1997	Novosinkovo	(Russia) HC Tornado (RWHL)

Preliminary round

Pos	Team	Pld	W	OTW	OTL	L	GF	GA	GD	Pts	Qualification
1	Canada	3	3	0	0	0	11	2	+9	9	Semifinals
2	United States	3	2	0	0	1	9	3	+6	6	Semifinals
3	Finland	3	1	0	0	2	7	8	−1	3	Quarterfinals
4	Olympic Athletes from Russia	3	0	0	0	3	1	15	−14	0	Quarterfinals

Source: IIHF

11 February 2018; 21:10	Canada	5–0 (0–0, 3–0, 2–0)	Olympic Athletes from Russia	Kwandong Hockey Centre, Gangneung; Attendance: 3,912

Game reference

Ann-Renée Desbiens
Goalies
Nadezhda Morozova
Nadezhda Aleksandrova
Referees:
(Slovakia) Nikoleta Celárová
(Sweden) Katarina Timglas
Linesmen:
(Finland) Jenni Heikkinen
(Germany) Lisa Linnek

Johnston (Jenner, Saulnier) – 21:55	1–0
Irwin (Johnston) (PP) – 24:13	2–0
Daoust (Agosta, Poulin) – 35:58	3–0
Johnston (Lacquette, Poulin) (PP2) – 48:41	4–0
Daoust (Poulin) – 50:44	5–0

4 min
Penalties
14 min
48
Shots
18

13 February 2018; 21:10	United States	5–0 (1–0, 3–0, 1–0)	Olympic Athletes from Russia	Kwandong Hockey Centre, Gangneung; Attendance: 3,797

Game reference

Nicole Hensley
Goalies
Valeria Tarakanova
Nadezhda Morozova
Referees:
(Canada) Gabrielle Ariano-Lortie
(Sweden) Gabriella Gran
Linesmen:
(Czech Republic) Zuzana Svobodová
(Finland) Johanna Tauriainen

Bellamy (Lamoureux-Davidson, Marvin) – 08:02	1–0
Lamoureux-Davidson (Lamoureux-Morando) – 31:46	2–0
Lamoureux-Davidson – 31:52	3–0
Marvin (Pelkey, Duggan) – 34:38	4–0
Brandt (Cameranesi, Keller) – 58:23	5–0

2 min
Penalties
6 min
50
Shots
13

15 February 2018; 16:40	Olympic Athletes from Russia	1–5 (0–1, 0–2, 1–2)	Finland	Kwandong Hockey Centre, Gangneung; Attendance: 3,353

Game reference

Nadezhda Morozova
Goalies
Noora Räty
Referees:
(Germany) Nicole Hertrich
(United States) Melissa Szkola
Linesmen:
(Germany) Lisa Linnek
(Canada) Justine Todd

	0–1	17:47 – Karvinen (Hiirikoski) (PP)
	0–2	20:20 – Karvinen (Nuutinen, Välilä)
	0–3	39:08 – Välilä
Shokhina (Belyakova) – 44:50	1–3
	1–4	52:49 – Tuominen (Hiirikoski, Nieminen) (PP)
	1–5	55:33 – Nieminen

8 min
Penalties
4 min
25
Shots
37

Quarterfinal

17 February 2018; 12:10	Olympic Athletes from Russia	6–2 (1–0, 2–2, 3–0)	Switzerland	Kwandong Hockey Centre, Gangneung; Attendance: 3,903

Game reference

Nadezhda Morozova
Goalies
Florence Schelling
Referees:
(Slovakia) Nikoleta Celárová
(Sweden) Gabriella Gran
Linesmen:
(France) Charlotte Girard-Fabre
(Finland) Johanna Tauriainen

Shokhina (SH2) – 07:22	1–0
	1–1	20:48 – Müller (Meier)
	1–2	31:47 – Stalder (Stänz, Meier) (PP)
Kulishova (Smolina) – 33:53	2–2
Ganeyeva (Shokhina) (PP) – 38:53	3–2
Dergachyova (Shokhina) – 47:36	4–2
Shokhina (Dergachyova) (PP) – 53:25	5–2
Sosina (SH, ENG) – 59:08	6–2

12 min
Penalties
8 min
21
Shots
19

Semifinal

19 February 2018; 21:10	Canada	5–0 (1–0, 1–0, 3–0)	Olympic Athletes from Russia	Gangneung Hockey Centre, Gangneung; Attendance: 3,396

Game reference

Shannon Szabados
Goalies
Valeria Tarakanova
Nadezhda Alexandrova
Referees:
(United States) Katie Guay
(United States) Melissa Szkola
Linesmen:
(Germany) Lisa Linnek
(Finland) Johanna Tauriainen

Wakefield (Spooner, Turnbull) – 01:50	1–0
Poulin (Daoust) – 23:10	2–0
Wakefield (Fortino, Turnbull) – 41:59	3–0
Clark (Stacey, Mikkelson) – 42:30	4–0
Johnston (Daoust, Irwin) (PP) – 54:08	5–0

4 min
Penalties
16 min
47
Shots
14

Bronze medal game

21 February 2018; 16:40	(bronze) Finland	3–2 (1–0, 2–1, 0–1)	Olympic Athletes from Russia	Kwandong Hockey Centre, Gangneung; Attendance: 3,217

Game reference

Noora Räty
Goalies
Nadezhda Morozova
Referees:
(United States) Dina Allen
(Canada) Gabrielle Ariano-Lortie
Linesmen:
(United States) Jessica Leclerc
(Canada) Justine Todd

Nieminen (Tuominen, Tapani) (PP) – 02:23	1–0
Tapani (Karvinen) – 20:10	2–0
	2–1	22:40 – Sosina (Belyakova)
Välimäki (Hovi) – 32:18	3–1
	3–2	46:03 – Belyakova (Batalova, Shtaryova) (PP)

8 min
Penalties
35 min
22
Shots
22

== Luge ==
Based on the results from the World Cups during the 2017–18 Luge World Cup season, Russia qualified 8 sleds (10 athletes). However, only 8 athletes (7 men and 1 woman) are set to join the pool of Olympic Athletes from Russia (OAR) after the accreditation commission of the International Olympic Committee (IOC).

Men

Athlete	Event	Run 1		Run 2		Run 3		Run 4		Total	
Athlete	Event	Time	Rank	Time	Rank	Time	Rank	Time	Rank	Time	Rank
Semen Pavlichenko	Singles	48.337	24	47.923	12	47.716	8	47.883	15	3:11.859	14
Roman Repilov	Singles	47.776	4	47.740	3	47.948	15	47.644	5	3:11.108	8
Stepan Fedorov	Singles	48.035	13	47.936	13	47.755	9	47.882	14	3:11.608	13
Vladislav Antonov; Alexander Denisyev	Doubles	46.437	11	46.344	11	—N/a				1:32.781	11
Andrei Bogdanov; Andrei Medvedev	Doubles	47.106	19	46.402	12	—N/a				1:33.508	16

Women

Athlete	Event	Run 1		Run 2		Run 3		Run 4		Total	
Athlete	Event	Time	Rank	Time	Rank	Time	Rank	Time	Rank	Time	Rank
Ekaterina Baturina	Singles	47.122	21	46.700	16	46.675	12	47.122	17	3:07.619	15

Mixed team relay

Athlete	Event	Women		Men		Doubles		Total	
Athlete	Event	Time	Rank	Time	Rank	Time	Rank	Time	Rank
Ekaterina Baturina; Roman Repilov; Vladislav Antonov; Alexander Denisyev	Team relay	47.523	9	48.615	1	49.211	7	2:25.349	7

== Nordic combined ==
Athlete	Event	Ski jumping			Cross-country		Total	
Athlete	Event	Distance	Points	Rank	Time	Rank	Time	Rank
Ernest Yahin	Normal hill/10 km	96.0	96.7	21	26:18.3	43	28:34.3	38
Ernest Yahin	Large hill/10 km	127.5	114.1	15	25:56.1	43	27:35.1	35

== Short track speed skating ==
According to the ISU Special Olympic Qualification Rankings, Russia has qualified 5 men and 5 women. However, only 7 athletes (3 men and 4 women) received an invitation from the IOC.

Men

Athlete	Event	Heat		Quarterfinal		Semifinal		Final	
Athlete	Event	Time	Rank	Time	Rank	Time	Rank	Time	Rank
Semion Elistratov	500 m	40.829	3	did not advance					
Semion Elistratov	1000 m	1:23.979	2 Q	1:23.893	1 Q	1:26.773	4 FB	1:27.621	6
Semion Elistratov	1500 m	2:13.087	3 Q	—N/a		2:11.003	1 FA	2:10.687	3rd place, bronze medalist(s)
Pavel Sitnikov	500 m	PEN		did not advance					
Pavel Sitnikov	1000 m	PEN		did not advance					
Pavel Sitnikov	1500 m	2:33.653	4	—N/a		did not advance			
Aleksandr Shulginov	500 m	40.585	2 Q	54.498	4	did not advance			
Aleksandr Shulginov	1000 m	1:31.133	4	did not advance					
Aleksandr Shulginov	1500 m	2:19.308	6	—N/a		did not advance			

Women

Athlete	Event	Heat		Quarterfinal		Semifinal		Final	
Athlete	Event	Time	Rank	Time	Rank	Time	Rank	Time	Rank
Ekaterina Efremenkova	1000 m	1:29.598	2 Q	1:29.466	3	did not advance			
Ekaterina Efremenkova	1500 m	PEN		—N/a		did not advance			
Emina Malagich	500 m	56.830	3	did not advance					
Sofia Prosvirnova	500 m	43.376	1 Q	43.466	1 Q	43.219	3 FB	—	5
Sofia Prosvirnova	1000 m	PEN		—N/a		did not advance			
Sofia Prosvirnova	1500 m	2:25.553	4	—N/a		did not advance			
Ekaterina Konstantinova; Emina Malagich; Sofia Prosvirnova; Ekaterina Efremenkova	3000 m relay	—N/a				4:21.973	4 FB	4:08.838	5

Qualification legend: ADV – Advanced due to being impeded by another skater; FA – Qualify to medal round; FB – Qualify to consolation round; AA – Advance to medal round due to being impeded by another skater

== Skeleton ==
Based on the world rankings, Russia qualified 5 sleds. However, only 2 athletes (2 men) received an invitation from the IOC. Nikita Tregubov, who had previously represented Russia at the Sochi 2014 Olympic Games, secured a silver medal in the event.

Athlete	Event	Run 1		Run 2		Run 3		Run 4		Total	
Athlete	Event	Time	Rank	Time	Rank	Time	Rank	Time	Rank	Time	Rank
Nikita Tregubov	Men's	50.59	2	50.50	4	50.53	5	50.56	2	3:22.18	2nd place, silver medalist(s)
Vladislav Marchenkov	Men's	51.27	15	51.49	20	51.05	13	51.37	15	3:25.18	15

== Ski jumping ==
Men

Athlete	Event	Qualification			First round			Final			Total	
Athlete	Event	Distance	Points	Rank	Distance	Points	Rank	Distance	Points	Rank	Points	Rank
Evgeni Klimov	Normal hill	102.0	121.4	12 Q	94.5	99.0	30 Q	81.5	69.2	30	168.2	30
Evgeni Klimov	Large hill	136.0	111.8	16 Q	125.0	116.4	24 Q	118.0	104.2	26	220.6	26
Denis Kornilov	Normal hill	94.5	107.2	28 Q	107.5	113.9	16 Q	96.5	95.7	28	209.6	24
Denis Kornilov	Large hill	129.0	101.7	26 Q	122.5	111.2	29 Q	110.5	85.1	30	196.3	30
Mikhail Nazarov	Normal hill	88.5	93.7	41 Q	94.5	92.1	34	did not advance				
Mikhail Nazarov	Large hill	122.0	92.3	33 Q	120.0	103.4	39	did not advance				
Alexey Romashov	Normal hill	90.0	98.5	34 Q	94.0	91.7	37	did not advance				
Alexey Romashov	Large hill	136.0	108.9	21 Q	119.0	99.8	42	did not advance				
Evgeni Klimov; Denis Kornilov; Mikhail Nazarov; Alexey Romashov	Team large hill	—N/a			474.5	409.6	7 Q	473.0	400.2	7	809.8	7

Women

Athlete	Event	First round			Final			Total	
Athlete	Event	Distance	Points	Rank	Distance	Points	Rank	Points	Rank
Irina Avvakumova	Normal hill	99.0	114.7	4 Q	102.0	116.0	5	230.7	4
Anastasiya Barannikova	Normal hill	88.0	83.7	17 Q	82.0	65.3	29	149.0	27
Alexandra Kustova	Normal hill	85.0	77.3	21 Q	85.5	75.0	28	152.3	24
Sofia Tikhonova	Normal hill	86.5	75.0	24 Q	86.0	75.8	25	150.8	25

== Snowboarding ==
Freestyle

Athlete	Event	Qualification				Final				
Athlete	Event	Run 1	Run 2	Best	Rank	Run 1	Run 2	Run 3	Best	Rank
Nikita Avtaneev	Men's halfpipe	63.25	32.75	63.25	20	did not advance				
Vlad Khadarin	Men's big air	83.75	79.25	83.75	11	did not advance				
Vlad Khadarin	Men's slopestyle	23.05	64.16	64.16	11	did not advance				
Anton Mamaev	Men's big air	29.00	42.75	42.75	16	did not advance				
Sofya Fyodorova	Women's big air	64.00	23.25	64.00	21	did not advance				
Sofya Fyodorova	Women's slopestyle	Canceled				27.53	65.73	CAN	65.73	8

Parallel

Athlete	Event	Qualification		Round of 16	Quarterfinal	Semifinal	Final	
Athlete	Event	Time	Rank	Opposition Time	Opposition Time	Opposition Time	Opposition Time	Rank
Dmitry Loginov	Men's giant slalom	1:31.00	32	did not advance				
Dmitry Sarsembaev	Men's giant slalom	1:25.74	14 Q	Lee S-h (KOR); L +0.54	did not advance			
Andrey Sobolev	Men's giant slalom	1:25.99	18	did not advance				
Vic Wild	Men's giant slalom	1:25.51	9 Q	Fischnaller (ITA); L +0.93	did not advance			
Milena Bykova	Women's giant slalom	1:33.09	9 Q	Ulbing (AUT); L +0.52	did not advance			
Natalia Soboleva	Women's giant slalom	1:33.93	19	did not advance				
Ekaterina Tudegesheva	Women's giant slalom	1:33.42	14 Q	Jörg (GER); L +0.65	did not advance			
Alena Zavarzina	Women's giant slalom	1:30.16	2 Q	Kotnik (SLO); W -0.03	Zogg (SUI); W -1.88	Jörg (GER); L DNF	Hofmeister (GER); L +4.07	4

Snowboard cross

Athlete	Event	Seeding						1/8 final	Quarterfinal	Semifinal	Final	
Athlete	Event	Run 1		Run 2		Best	Seed	1/8 final	Quarterfinal	Semifinal	Final	
Athlete	Event	Time	Rank	Time	Rank	Best	Seed	Position	Position	Position	Position	Rank
Daniil Dilman	Men's snowboard cross	1:15.40	25	1:16.11	=8	1:15.40	31	4	did not advance			
Nikolay Olyunin	Men's snowboard cross	1:13.78	4	Bye		1:13.78	4	1 Q	1 Q	DNF FB	DNS	11
Kristina Paul	Women's snowboard cross	1:21.93	19	1:19.93	2	1:19.93	14	—N/a	2 Q	DNF FB	DNF	12
Mariya Vasiltsova	Women's snowboard cross	1:20.57	12	Bye		1:20.57	12	—N/a	DNF	did not advance		

Qualification legend: FA – Qualify to medal round; FB – Qualify to consolation round

== Speed skating ==
Russia earned the following quotas at the conclusion of the four World Cup's used for qualification.

Athlete	Event	Race	
Athlete	Event	Time	Rank
Sergey Trofimov	Men's 1500 m	1:46.69	18
Angelina Golikova	Women's 500 m	37.62	7
Angelina Golikova	Women's 1000 m	1:16.85	22
Natalia Voronina	Women's 3000 m	4:05.85	10
Natalia Voronina	Women's 5000 m	6:53.98	3rd place, bronze medalist(s)

== See also ==
- Neutral Paralympic Athletes at the 2018 Winter Paralympics
- Russia at the 2018 Summer Youth Olympics
