= Ilya Kablukov =

Russian ice hockey player (born 1988)

- Born: 18 January 1988 (age 38) Moscow, Russian SFSR, Soviet Union
- Height: 6 ft 2 in (188 cm)
- Weight: 196 lb (89 kg; 14 st 0 lb)
- Position: Center
- Shoots: Left
- KHL team Former teams: Shanghai Dragons; CSKA Moscow; Torpedo Nizhny Novgorod; Spartak Moscow; Atlant Moscow Oblast; SKA Saint Petersburg; Avangard Omsk; Dynamo Moscow
- National team: Russia
- NHL draft: 144th overall, 2007; Vancouver Canucks
- Playing career: 2006–present

Ilya Andreyevich Kablukov (Russian: Илья Андреевич Каблуков) (born 18 January 1988) is a Russian professional ice hockey forward. He is currently with the Shanghai Dragons of the Kontinental Hockey League (KHL). Kablukov was selected by the Vancouver Canucks in the 5th round (146th overall) of the 2007 NHL entry draft.

== Playing career ==
Kablukov was playing with Torpedo Nizhny Novgorod in the Kontinental Hockey League before signing on 21 July 2009 with league rival HC Spartak Moscow. He was drafted by the Vancouver Canucks in 2007 but was never signed and had his rights relinquished.

As an impending free agent from powerhouse SKA Saint Petersburg after seven seasons, Kablukov was traded to Amur Khabarovsk before he moved to fellow KHL outfit Metallurg Magnitogorsk, signing a one-year contract on 2 June 2020. He was then traded just two days later by Metallurg to Avangard Omsk in exchange for Taylor Beck.

On 29 May 2022, Kablukov signed a one-year contract with his seventh KHL club, Dynamo Moscow, for the 2022–23 season.

In November 2024, Kablukov returned to Avangard Omsk on a two-way deal.

== International play ==
Medal record

Ice hockey

Representing Olympic Athletes from Russia

Olympic Games
Gold medal – first place	2018 Pyeongchang	

Kablukov has played for the Russian national team at the World Under-18 Championships, Senior World Championships and Olympic Games. He was a member of the Olympic Athletes from Russia team at the 2018 Winter Olympics, where he won the gold medal.

== Career statistics ==
=== Regular season and playoffs ===
			Regular season					Playoffs
Season	Team	League	GP	G	A	Pts	PIM	GP	G	A	Pts	PIM
2004–05	CSKA–2 Moscow	RUS.3	25	0	2	2	10	—	—	—	—	—
2005–06	CSKA–2 Moscow	RUS.3	50	6	11	17	20	—	—	—	—	—
2006–07	CSKA–2 Moscow	RUS.3	42	10	25	35	38	—	—	—	—	—
2006–07	CSKA Moscow	RSL	24	0	0	0	0	2	0	0	0	0
2007–08	CSKA Moscow	RSL	50	4	9	13	18	6	1	3	4	2
2007–08	CSKA–2 Moscow	RUS.3	—	—	—	—	—	2	1	3	4	2
2008–09	Torpedo Nizhny Novgorod	KHL	42	1	3	4	8	3	0	0	0	4
2008–09	Torpedo–2 Nizhny Novgorod	RUS.3	3	2	0	2	0	7	2	3	5	2
2009–10	Spartak Moscow	KHL	54	5	7	12	24	4	0	0	0	0
2010–11	Spartak Moscow	KHL	11	0	2	2	8	—	—	—	—	—
2010–11	Atlant Moscow Oblast	KHL	25	4	3	7	8	13	0	1	1	2
2011–12	Atlant Moscow Oblast	KHL	46	4	3	7	20	12	2	0	2	2
2012–13	Atlant Moscow Oblast	KHL	51	4	12	16	14	5	0	0	0	2
2013–14	Atlant Moscow Oblast	KHL	43	2	14	16	43	—	—	—	—	—
2013–14	SKA Saint Petersburg	KHL	9	1	3	4	0	—	—	—	—	—
2014–15	SKA Saint Petersburg	KHL	45	4	10	14	13	22	2	1	3	14
2015–16	SKA Saint Petersburg	KHL	55	3	8	11	14	15	1	0	1	16
2016–17	SKA Saint Petersburg	KHL	47	5	5	10	35	16	0	1	1	16
2017–18	SKA Saint Petersburg	KHL	47	3	13	16	22	15	2	2	4	8
2018–19	SKA Saint Petersburg	KHL	49	3	5	8	10	18	0	0	0	11
2019–20	SKA Saint Petersburg	KHL	48	0	3	3	43	—	—	—	—	—
2020–21	Avangard Omsk	KHL	42	1	1	2	14	16	1	1	2	2
2021–22	Avangard Omsk	KHL	46	2	2	4	11	11	0	1	1	0
2022–23	Dynamo Moscow	KHL	68	7	9	16	12	6	0	1	1	6
2023–24	Dynamo Moscow	KHL	68	3	5	8	30	10	0	0	0	2
2024–25	Avangard Omsk	KHL	42	3	13	16	10	13	0	2	2	8
2025–26	Shanghai Dragons	KHL	20	1	3	4	8	—	—	—	—	—
KHL totals			858	56	124	180	347	189	9	12	21	95

=== International ===
Year	Team	Event	Result	GP	G	A	Pts	PIM
2005	Russia	IH18	4th	5	1	1	2	2
2006	Russia	U18	5th	6	0	0	0	2
2018	OAR	OG	1st place, gold medalist(s)	5	1	2	3	2
2018	Russia	WC	6th	8	1	3	4	0
Junior totals				11	1	1	2	4
Senior totals				13	2	5	7	2

== Awards and honors ==
Award	Year
KHL
Gagarin Cup (SKA Saint Petersburg)	2015, 2017
Gagarin Cup (Avangard Omsk)	2021
