= Bogdan Kiselevich =

Russian ice hockey player (born 1990)

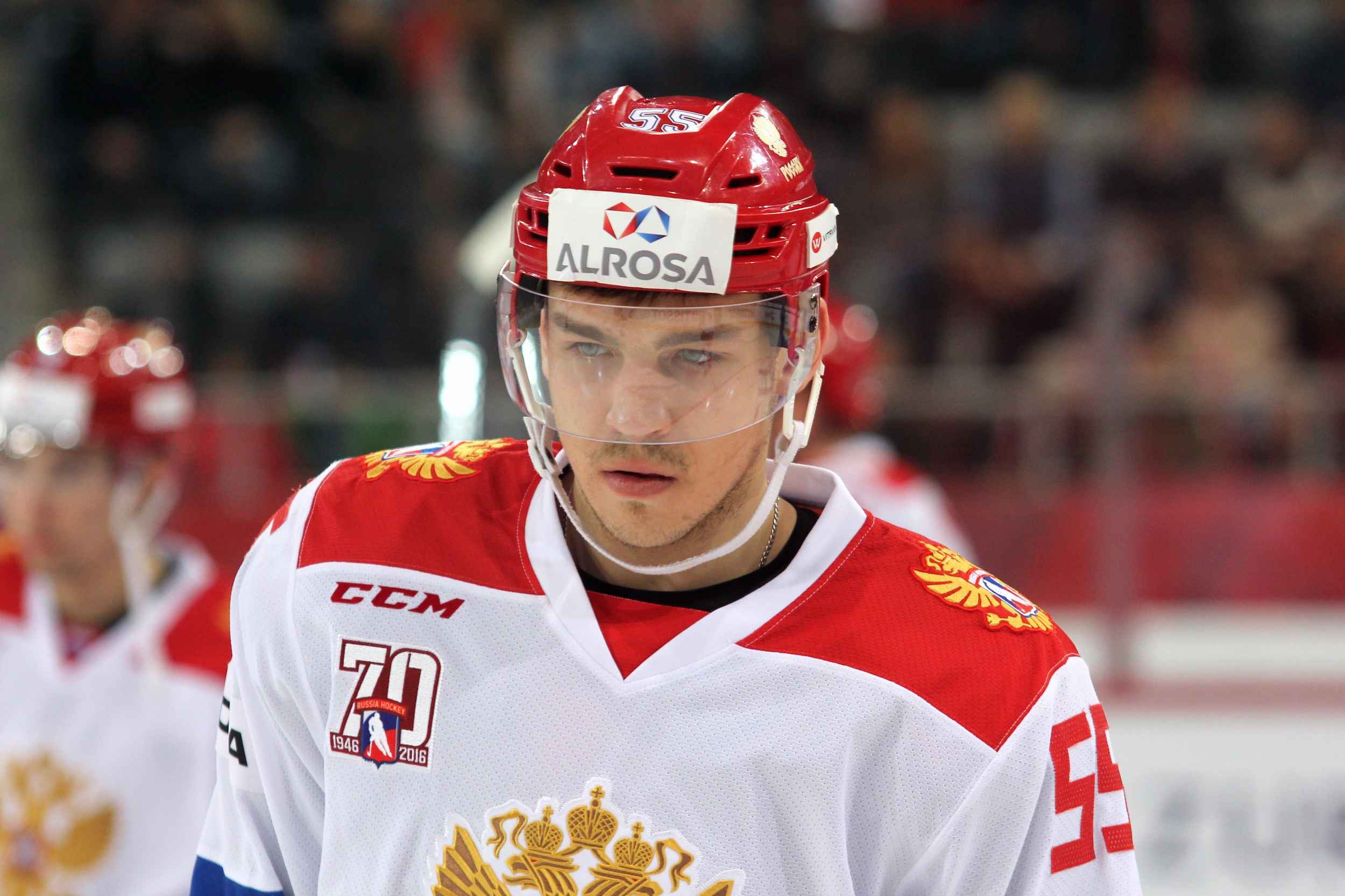
- Kiselevich with Russia in 2017
- Born: 14 February 1990 (age 36) Cherepovets, Russian SFSR, Soviet Union
- Height: 6 ft 0 in (183 cm)
- Weight: 207 lb (94 kg; 14 st 11 lb)
- Position: Defence
- Shot: Left
- Played for: Severstal Cherepovets; CSKA Moscow; Florida Panthers; Avangard Omsk; Neftekhimik Nizhnekamsk; Lokomotiv Yaroslavl
- National team: Russia
- NHL draft: Undrafted
- Playing career: 2005–2025

Bogdan Alexandrovich Kiselevich (Russian: Богдан Александрович Киселевич) (born 14 February 1990) is a Russian former professional ice hockey defenceman. He last played for Lokomotiv Yaroslavl in the Kontinental Hockey League (KHL). He has formerly played in the National Hockey League (NHL) with the Florida Panthers.

== Playing career ==
Kiselevich spent his youth career with HC Severstal Cherepovets. Subsequently, he played nine seasons for Severstal in the KHL. On 9 May 2014, Kiselevich was traded to powerhouse CSKA Moscow. He subsequently agreed to a new two-year contract.

On 2 June 2018, Kiselevich, as a free agent, signed a one-year, one-way contract with the Florida Panthers of the NHL for the 2018–19 season. After attending the Panthers 2018 training camp, Kiselevich made the opening season roster, he made his NHL debut with Florida in a 3–2 defeat to the Vancouver Canucks at the BB&T Center in Sunrise, Florida on October 13, 2018. In his second game he registered his first point, an assist on a goal by Evgenii Dadonov, in a 6–5 shootout loss to the Philadelphia Flyers on October 16, 2018. Kiselevich rotated among the Panthers depth defenseman to appear in 32 games for 8 assists. At the trade deadline on 25 February 2019, he was traded by the Panthers to the Winnipeg Jets. Kiselevich joined the Jets, serving as a healthy scratch for the remainder of the regular season and playoffs.

On 1 July 2019, Kiselevich left the Jets and the NHL as a free agent, opting to return to the KHL with his former club, CSKA Moscow, on a three-year contract.

After playing out the final two seasons of his contract with Avangard Omsk, Kiselevich left as a free agent and was signed to a one-year contract for the 2024–25 season with HC Neftekhimik Nizhnekamsk on 28 July 2024. After 25 games, Kiselevich left the club and signed a tryout with Lokomotiv Yaroslavl on 10 December 2024. On 24 December 2024, his contract was converted to a full-year deal. With Lokomotiv Yaroslavl, Kiselevich played 13 regular season games as the team went on to win the Gagarin Cup.

On 16 June 2026, Kiselevich announced his retirement from professional hockey.

== International play ==
Medal record

Ice hockey

Representing Olympic Athletes from Russia

Olympic Games
| Gold medal – first place | 2018 Pyeongchang | |

Representing Russia

World Championships
| Bronze medal – third place | 2017 Germany/France | |

Kiselevich made his international debut with Russia at the 2017 World Championships. He was later selected to represent the Olympic Athletes from Russia team at the 2018 Winter Olympics. He contributed 2 assists in 6 games to claim the gold medal in Pyeongchang, Korea.

== Career statistics ==
=== Regular season and playoffs ===
| | | | Regular season | | | | | Playoffs |
| Season | Team | League | GP | G | A | Pts | PIM | GP | G | A | Pts | PIM |
|---|---|---|---|---|---|---|---|---|---|---|---|---|
| 2005–06 | Severstal–2 Cherepovets | RUS.3 | 24 | 0 | 4 | 4 | 16 | — | — | — | — | — |
| 2006–07 | Severstal–2 Cherepovets | RUS.3 | 58 | 3 | 15 | 18 | 66 | — | — | — | — | — |
| 2007–08 | Severstal–2 Cherepovets | RUS.2 | 26 | 8 | 15 | 23 | 57 | — | — | — | — | — |
| 2007–08 | CSK VVS Samara | RUS.2 | 16 | 0 | 3 | 3 | 12 | — | — | — | — | — |
| 2008–09 | HK Lipetsk | RUS.2 | 27 | 1 | 4 | 5 | 34 | — | — | — | — | — |
| 2008–09 | Severstal–2 Cherepovets | RUS.3 | 12 | 2 | 3 | 5 | 12 | 14 | 2 | 2 | 4 | 14 |
| 2009–10 | Severstal Cherepovets | KHL | 43 | 0 | 0 | 0 | 20 | — | — | — | — | — |
| 2009–10 | Almaz Cherepovets | MHL | 13 | 4 | 5 | 9 | 14 | 3 | 0 | 0 | 0 | 4 |
| 2010–11 | Severstal Cherepovets | KHL | 26 | 3 | 5 | 8 | 30 | 4 | 0 | 0 | 0 | 6 |
| 2010–11 | Almaz Cherepovets | MHL | 10 | 2 | 3 | 5 | 12 | 5 | 0 | 1 | 1 | 4 |
| 2011–12 | Severstal Cherepovets | KHL | 47 | 3 | 8 | 11 | 69 | 6 | 0 | 0 | 0 | 6 |
| 2011–12 | Almaz Cherepovets | MHL | — | — | — | — | — | 9 | 1 | 2 | 3 | 22 |
| 2012–13 | Severstal Cherepovets | KHL | 39 | 4 | 15 | 19 | 55 | 10 | 0 | 2 | 2 | 4 |
| 2013–14 | Severstal Cherepovets | KHL | 50 | 3 | 10 | 13 | 42 | — | — | — | — | — |
| 2014–15 | CSKA Moscow | KHL | 49 | 4 | 12 | 16 | 48 | 11 | 0 | 0 | 0 | 6 |
| 2015–16 | CSKA Moscow | KHL | 50 | 4 | 13 | 17 | 41 | 9 | 0 | 5 | 5 | 20 |
| 2016–17 | CSKA Moscow | KHL | 45 | 2 | 21 | 23 | 57 | 10 | 2 | 6 | 8 | 6 |
| 2017–18 | CSKA Moscow | KHL | 44 | 0 | 16 | 16 | 24 | 21 | 1 | 2 | 3 | 18 |
| 2018–19 | Florida Panthers | NHL | 32 | 0 | 8 | 8 | 12 | — | — | — | — | — |
| 2019–20 | CSKA Moscow | KHL | 56 | 4 | 14 | 18 | 24 | 4 | 0 | 0 | 0 | 4 |
| 2020–21 | CSKA Moscow | KHL | 48 | 4 | 14 | 18 | 75 | 23 | 0 | 2 | 2 | 8 |
| 2021–22 | CSKA Moscow | KHL | 26 | 0 | 0 | 0 | 6 | 19 | 0 | 4 | 4 | 6 |
| 2022–23 | CSKA Moscow | KHL | 22 | 0 | 5 | 5 | 6 | — | — | — | — | — |
| 2022–23 | Avangard Omsk | KHL | 24 | 0 | 1 | 1 | 10 | 6 | 0 | 0 | 0 | 2 |
| 2023–24 | Avangard Omsk | KHL | 60 | 0 | 8 | 8 | 36 | 12 | 0 | 0 | 0 | 4 |
| KHL totals | | | 629 | 31 | 142 | 173 | 543 | 135 | 3 | 21 | 24 | 90 |
| NHL totals | | | 32 | 0 | 8 | 8 | 12 | — | — | — | — | — |

=== International ===
| Year | Team | Event | Result | GP | G | A | Pts | PIM |
|---|---|---|---|---|---|---|---|---|
| 2017 | Russia | WC | 3rd place, bronze medalist(s) | 10 | 3 | 2 | 5 | 4 |
| 2018 | OAR | OG | 1st place, gold medalist(s) | 6 | 0 | 2 | 2 | 2 |
| 2018 | Russia | WC | 6th | 8 | 0 | 1 | 1 | 2 |
| Senior totals | | | | 24 | 3 | 5 | 8 | 8 |

== Awards and honors ==
| Award | Year |
|---|---|
KHL
| All-Star Game | 2014 |
| First All-Star Team | 2018 |
| Gagarin Cup (CSKA Moscow) | 2022 |
