= Ivan Telegin =

Russian ice hockey player (born 1992)

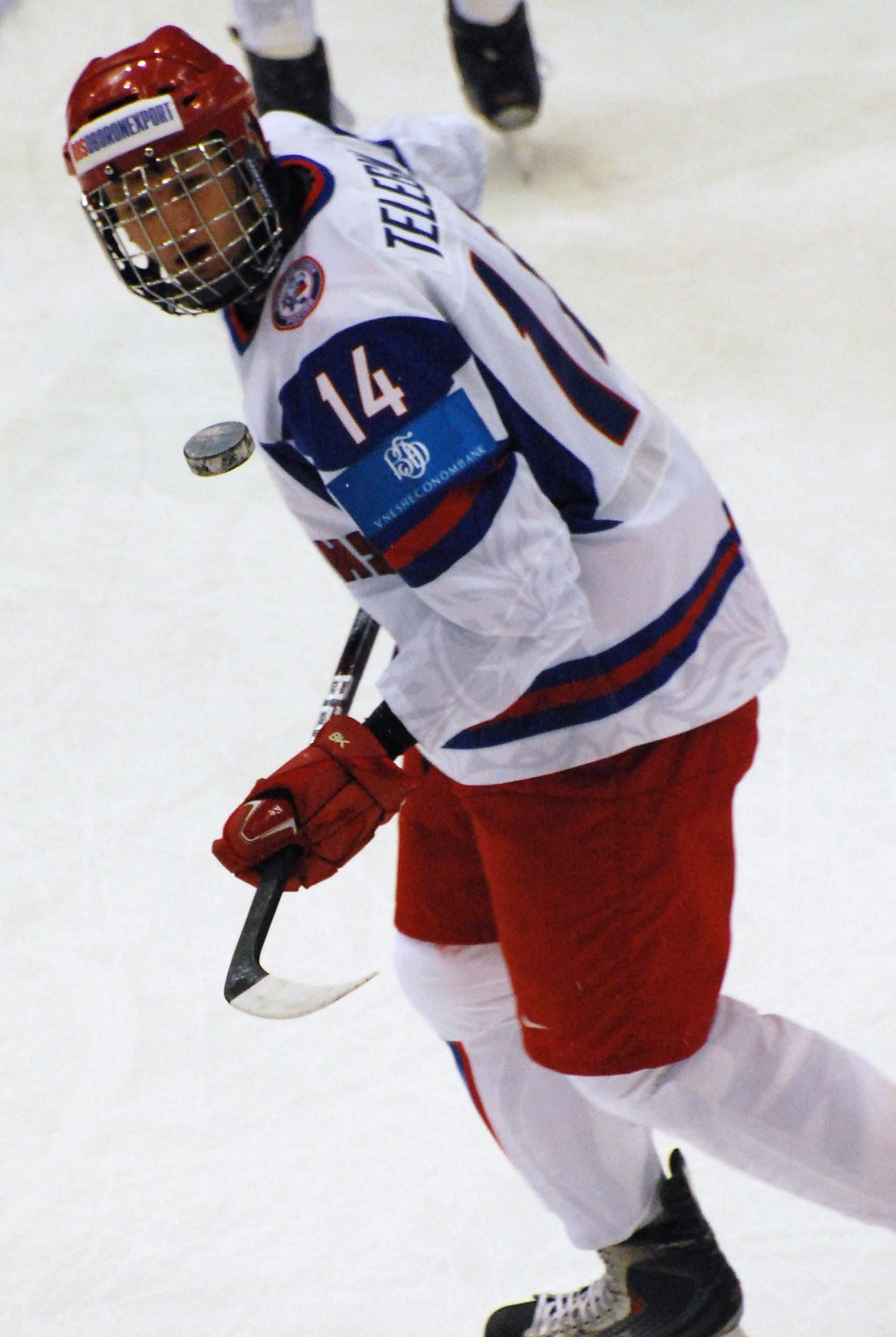
- Telegin with Russia at the 2010 World Junior Ice Hockey Championships
- Born: 28 February 1992 (age 34) Novokuznetsk, Russia
- Height: 6 ft 4 in (193 cm)
- Weight: 198 lb (90 kg; 14 st 2 lb)
- Position: Center
- Shoots: Left
- KHL team Former teams: Free agent St. John's IceCaps; CSKA Moscow; Avangard Omsk
- National team: Russia
- NHL draft: 101st overall, 2010; Atlanta Thrashers
- Playing career: 2009–present

Ivan Alexeyvich Telegin (Russian: Иван Алексеевич Телегин; born 28 February 1992) is a Russian professional ice hockey centre who is currently an unrestricted free agent. He most recently played for Avangard Omsk in the Kontinental Hockey League (KHL). He was drafted by the Atlanta Thrashers, 101st overall, in the 2010 NHL entry draft.

== Playing career ==
Telegin represented Russia at the 2010 World Junior Ice Hockey Championships where Russia finished in sixth place, whilst playing junior hockey in North America with the Saginaw Spirit and Barrie Colts in the Ontario Hockey League. After his NHL rights were transferred to the Winnipeg Jets after the Thrashers relocation, on 26 July 2011, Telegin was signed to a three-year entry-level contract with the Jets.

He was returned to the OHL for the following season before making his North American professional debut with the Jets American Hockey League affiliate, the St. John's IceCaps in the 2012–13 season. Telegin produced only 3 goals and 10 points in 34 games as his season was hampered by ongoing concussion and post-concussion symptoms.

With the symptoms carrying over in the off-season, Telegin was suspended by Winnipeg after he refused assignment to the IceCaps for the beginning of the 2013–14 season on 29 September 2013. On 13 January 2014, with Telegin intent on remaining in Russia, the Jets lifted his suspension and assigned him to CSKA Moscow of the KHL. Telegin would miss the entirety of the season due to his contract dispute and lingering concussion issues.

After missing the entire 2013–14 season due to complications after suffering a concussion, Telegin played 31 games in the KHL in 2014–15, for CSKA Moscow. He spent the season fighting for ice time and playing primarily a bottom-six role for the team. He had three goals and one assist on the season. Telegin opted to continue in the KHL, re-signed to a further three-year contract to remain with CSKA Moscow on 7 June 2016.

On 18 May 2021, Telegin left CSKA as a free agent and was signed to a two-year contract with newly crowned champions, Avangard Omsk.

== International play ==
Telegin has played for the Russian national team in the World Junior Championships, World Championships and the World Cup of Hockey. He is a member of the Olympic Athletes from Russia team at the 2018 Winter Olympics.

== Career statistics ==
=== Regular season and playoffs ===
| | | | Regular season | | | | | Playoffs |
| Season | Team | League | GP | G | A | Pts | PIM | GP | G | A | Pts | PIM |
|---|---|---|---|---|---|---|---|---|---|---|---|---|
| 2007–08 | Metallurg–2 Novokuznetsk | RUS.3 | 1 | 0 | 0 | 0 | 0 | — | — | — | — | — |
| 2008–09 | Metallurg–2 Novokuznetsk | RUS.3 | 10 | 1 | 5 | 6 | 4 | — | — | — | — | — |
| 2009–10 | Saginaw Spirit | OHL | 51 | 26 | 18 | 44 | 20 | 6 | 1 | 1 | 2 | 6 |
| 2010–11 | Saginaw Spirit | OHL | 59 | 20 | 41 | 61 | 35 | 12 | 2 | 8 | 10 | 8 |
| 2011–12 | Barrie Colts | OHL | 46 | 35 | 29 | 64 | 26 | 13 | 5 | 9 | 14 | 6 |
| 2012–13 | St. John's IceCaps | AHL | 34 | 3 | 7 | 10 | 8 | — | — | — | — | — |
| 2014–15 | CSKA Moscow | KHL | 31 | 3 | 1 | 4 | 29 | 3 | 0 | 0 | 0 | 2 |
| 2015–16 | CSKA Moscow | KHL | 41 | 6 | 3 | 9 | 22 | 18 | 3 | 5 | 8 | 8 |
| 2016–17 | CSKA Moscow | KHL | 43 | 3 | 9 | 12 | 30 | 10 | 0 | 2 | 2 | 10 |
| 2017–18 | CSKA Moscow | KHL | 44 | 7 | 7 | 14 | 12 | 17 | 0 | 3 | 3 | 40 |
| 2018–19 | CSKA Moscow | KHL | 49 | 6 | 16 | 22 | 26 | 20 | 1 | 2 | 3 | 9 |
| 2019–20 | CSKA Moscow | KHL | 32 | 4 | 2 | 6 | 6 | — | — | — | — | — |
| 2020–21 | CSKA Moscow | KHL | 35 | 6 | 6 | 12 | 6 | 22 | 2 | 2 | 4 | 2 |
| 2021–22 | Avangard Omsk | KHL | 27 | 5 | 5 | 10 | 4 | 13 | 3 | 2 | 5 | 2 |
| 2022–23 | Avangard Omsk | KHL | 53 | 9 | 9 | 18 | 8 | 14 | 0 | 5 | 5 | 6 |
| 2023–24 | Avangard Omsk | KHL | 26 | 1 | 6 | 7 | 10 | 1 | 0 | 0 | 0 | 0 |
| AHL totals | | | 34 | 3 | 7 | 10 | 8 | — | — | — | — | — |
| KHL totals | | | 381 | 50 | 64 | 114 | 153 | 118 | 9 | 21 | 30 | 79 |

Medal record

Ice hockey

Representing Olympic Athletes from Russia

Olympic Games
| Gold medal – first place | 2018 Pyeongchang | |

Representing Russia

World Championships
| Bronze medal – third place | 2016 Russia | |
| Bronze medal – third place | 2017 Germany/France | |
| Bronze medal – third place | 2019 Slovakia | |

World Junior Championships
| Silver medal – second place | 2012 Canada | |

=== International ===
| Year | Team | Event | Result | GP | G | A | Pts | PIM |
|---|---|---|---|---|---|---|---|---|
| 2009 | Russia | WHC17 | 7th | 5 | 2 | 2 | 4 | 4 |
| 2009 | Russia | IH18 | 2nd place, silver medalist(s) | 3 | 0 | 3 | 3 | 0 |
| 2010 | Russia | WJC | 6th | 5 | 0 | 0 | 0 | 2 |
| 2012 | Russia | WJC | 2nd place, silver medalist(s) | 6 | 1 | 1 | 2 | 12 |
| 2016 | Russia | WC | 3rd place, bronze medalist(s) | 10 | 4 | 2 | 6 | 4 |
| 2016 | Russia | WCH | 4th | 4 | 1 | 2 | 3 | 0 |
| 2017 | Russia | WC | 3rd place, bronze medalist(s) | 10 | 2 | 1 | 3 | 4 |
| 2018 | OAR | OG | 1st place, gold medalist(s) | 6 | 1 | 2 | 3 | 4 |
| 2019 | Russia | WC | 3rd place, bronze medalist(s) | 8 | 1 | 1 | 2 | 4 |
| Junior totals | | | | 19 | 3 | 6 | 9 | 18 |
| Senior totals | | | | 38 | 9 | 8 | 17 | 16 |

== Awards and honors ==
| Award | Year |
|---|---|
OHL
| Second All-Rookie Team | 2010 |
KHL
| All-Star Game | 2017 |
| Gagarin Cup (CSKA Moscow) | 2019 |
