= Sergey Kalinin (ice hockey) =

Russian ice hockey player (born 1991)

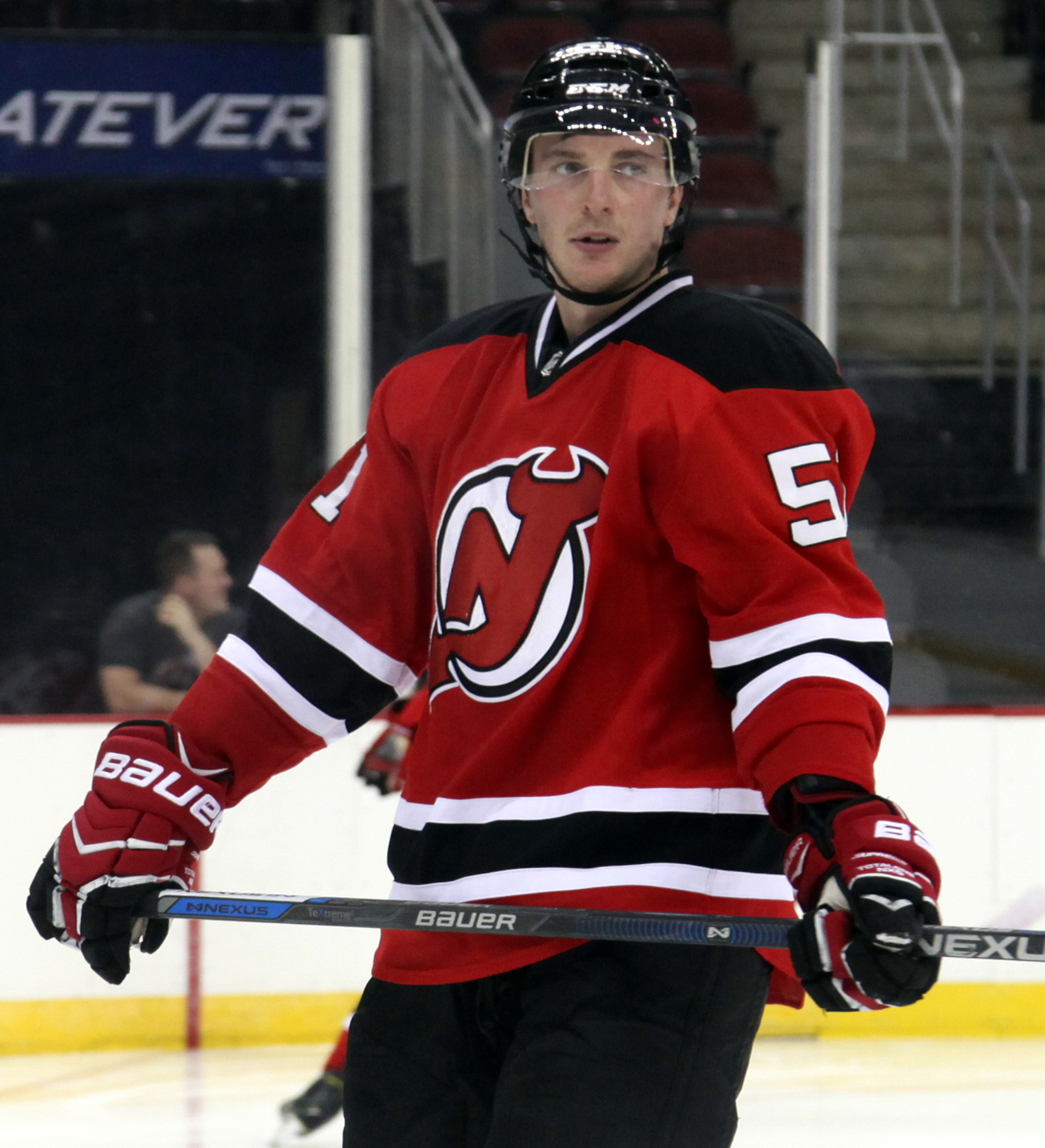
- Born: March 17, 1991 (age 35) Omsk, Russian SFSR, Soviet Union
- Height: 6 ft 3 in (191 cm)
- Weight: 190 lb (86 kg; 13 st 8 lb)
- Position: Forward
- Shoots: Left
- KHL team Former teams: Dinamo Minsk; Avangard Omsk; New Jersey Devils; Toronto Marlies; SKA Saint Petersburg; CSKA Moscow; Traktor Chelyabinsk; HC Vityaz
- National team: Russia
- NHL draft: Undrafted
- Playing career: 2010–present

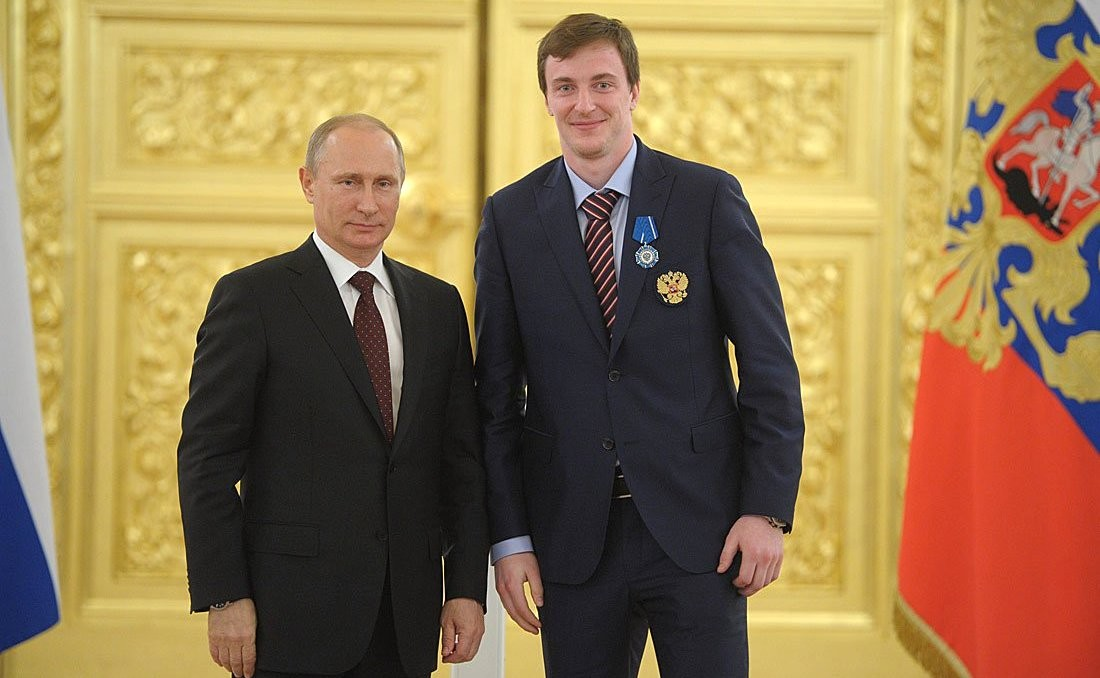
Sergey Kalinin and Vladimir Putin (2014)

Sergey Pavlovich Kalinin (Russian: Сергей Калинин, born March 17, 1991) is a Russian professional ice hockey forward who plays for HC Dinamo Minsk of the Kontinental Hockey League (KHL). He formerly played for the New Jersey Devils in the National Hockey League (NHL).

== Playing career ==
Undrafted, Kalinin played professionally in his native Russia with Kontinental Hockey League club, Avangard Omsk. Kalinin spent five seasons with Avangard and in the 2014–15 season, he set career highs in all categories with 12 goals, 13 assists, 25 points, 49 penalty minutes and 58 games played, while serving as the club’s captain as a 23-year-old.

On May 29, 2015, Kalinin left Avangard Omsk and signed a one-year entry-level deal with the New Jersey Devils of the NHL. In the 2015–16 season, he made his NHL debut October 9, 2015 against the Winnipeg Jets at Prudential Center. Kalinin completed his first NHL campaign scoring eight goals and seven assists for 15 points with 33 penalty minutes in 78 games.

On July 6, 2016, Kalinin opted to remain with the Devils in agreeing to a one-year contract as a restricted free agent. Kalinin would record four points in 43 games with the Devils the following season, before being placed on waivers on February 17, 2017 for the purpose of being sent to the AHL. He cleared the following day, but was traded to the Toronto Maple Leafs in exchange for defensive prospect Viktor Lööv. Toronto opted to trade for Kalinin instead of claim him as claiming would have put the team at the 50 contract limit heading into the March 1 trade deadline, where trading Loov allows for some deadline flexibility. He was immediately assigned to the Toronto Marlies following the deal.

After finishing the year with the Marlies, Kalinin as a free agent from the Maple Leafs, chose to return to his native Russia, signing a three-year deal with SKA Saint Petersburg of the KHL on July 1, 2017.

Approaching the 2018–19 season, Kalinin was traded by SKA to fellow powerhouse club, HC CSKA Moscow in exchange for Andrei Kuzmenko on August 8, 2018.

Kalinin played two seasons with CSKA Moscow, before leaving as a free agent. On July 15, 2020, Kalinin agreed to a two-year contract with his fourth KHL club, Traktor Chelyabinsk.

With the 2024–25 season underway, Kalinin belatedly joined HC Vityaz as a free agent, agreeing to a two-year contract through 2026 on 15 October 2024.

As a free agent following a second stint with CSKA Moscow, Kalinin extended his KHL career by agreeing to a one-year deal after an initial try-out with Belarusian club, HC Dinamo Minsk, for the 2026–27 season on 18 August 2026.

== International play ==
Medal record

Ice hockey

Representing Olympic Athletes from Russia

Olympic Games
Gold medal – first place	2018 Pyeongchang	

Representing Russia

World Championships
Gold medal – first place	2014 Minsk	
Bronze medal – third place	2016 Russia	

World Junior Championships
Gold medal – first place	2011 United States	

Kalinin has played for the Russian national team in the World Junior Championships and World Championships. He was a member of the Olympic Athletes from Russia team that won the gold medal at the 2018 Winter Olympics.

== Career statistics ==
=== Regular season and playoffs ===
			Regular season					Playoffs
Season	Team	League	GP	G	A	Pts	PIM	GP	G	A	Pts	PIM
2008–09	Avangard–2 Omsk	RUS.3	41	5	13	18	16	—	—	—	—	—
2009–10	Omskie Yastreby	MHL	54	14	22	36	52	8	1	1	2	2
2009–10	Avangard Omsk	KHL	1	0	0	0	2	—	—	—	—	—
2010–11	Omskie Yastreby	MHL	5	1	4	5	4	—	—	—	—	—
2010–11	Avangard Omsk	KHL	24	0	1	1	0	8	0	1	1	0
2011–12	Avangard Omsk	KHL	53	9	9	18	20	19	2	1	3	10
2012–13	Avangard Omsk	KHL	26	2	6	8	10	6	1	0	1	4
2013–14	Avangard Omsk	KHL	51	8	9	17	32	—	—	—	—	—
2014–15	Avangard Omsk	KHL	58	12	13	25	49	6	0	0	0	2
2015–16	New Jersey Devils	NHL	78	8	7	15	33	—	—	—	—	—
2016–17	New Jersey Devils	NHL	43	2	2	4	15	—	—	—	—	—
2016–17	Toronto Marlies	AHL	19	2	2	4	9	11	1	0	1	4
2017–18	SKA Saint Petersburg	KHL	49	15	16	31	20	6	0	2	2	2
2018–19	CSKA Moscow	KHL	39	3	9	12	8	15	0	1	1	4
2019–20	CSKA Moscow	KHL	57	7	3	10	10	4	0	0	0	6
2020–21	Traktor Chelyabinsk	KHL	56	12	13	25	26	5	0	1	1	2
2021–22	Traktor Chelyabinsk	KHL	40	6	9	15	27	15	1	4	5	6
2022–23	Traktor Chelyabinsk	KHL	68	12	16	28	20	—	—	—	—	—
2023–24	Traktor Chelyabinsk	KHL	62	4	15	19	34	7	0	0	0	2
2024–25	HC Vityaz	KHL	36	2	4	6	14	—	—	—	—	—
2025–26	CSKA Moscow	KHL	28	3	1	4	6	9	1	1	2	0
KHL totals			648	95	124	219	278	100	5	11	16	38
NHL totals			121	10	9	19	48	—	—	—	—	—

=== International ===
Year	Team	Event	Result	GP	G	A	Pts	PIM
2011	Russia	WJC	1st place, gold medalist(s)	7	1	2	3	4
2014	Russia	WC	1st place, gold medalist(s)	9	2	1	3	6
2016	Russia	WC	3rd place, bronze medalist(s)	10	0	3	3	4
2018	OAR	OG	1st place, gold medalist(s)	6	1	2	3	8
Junior totals				7	1	2	3	4
Senior totals				25	3	6	9	18

== Awards and honors ==
Award	Year
MHL
All-Star Game	2010
KHL
Gagarin Cup (CSKA Moscow)	2019
