= Sergei Andronov =

Russian ice hockey player (born 1989)

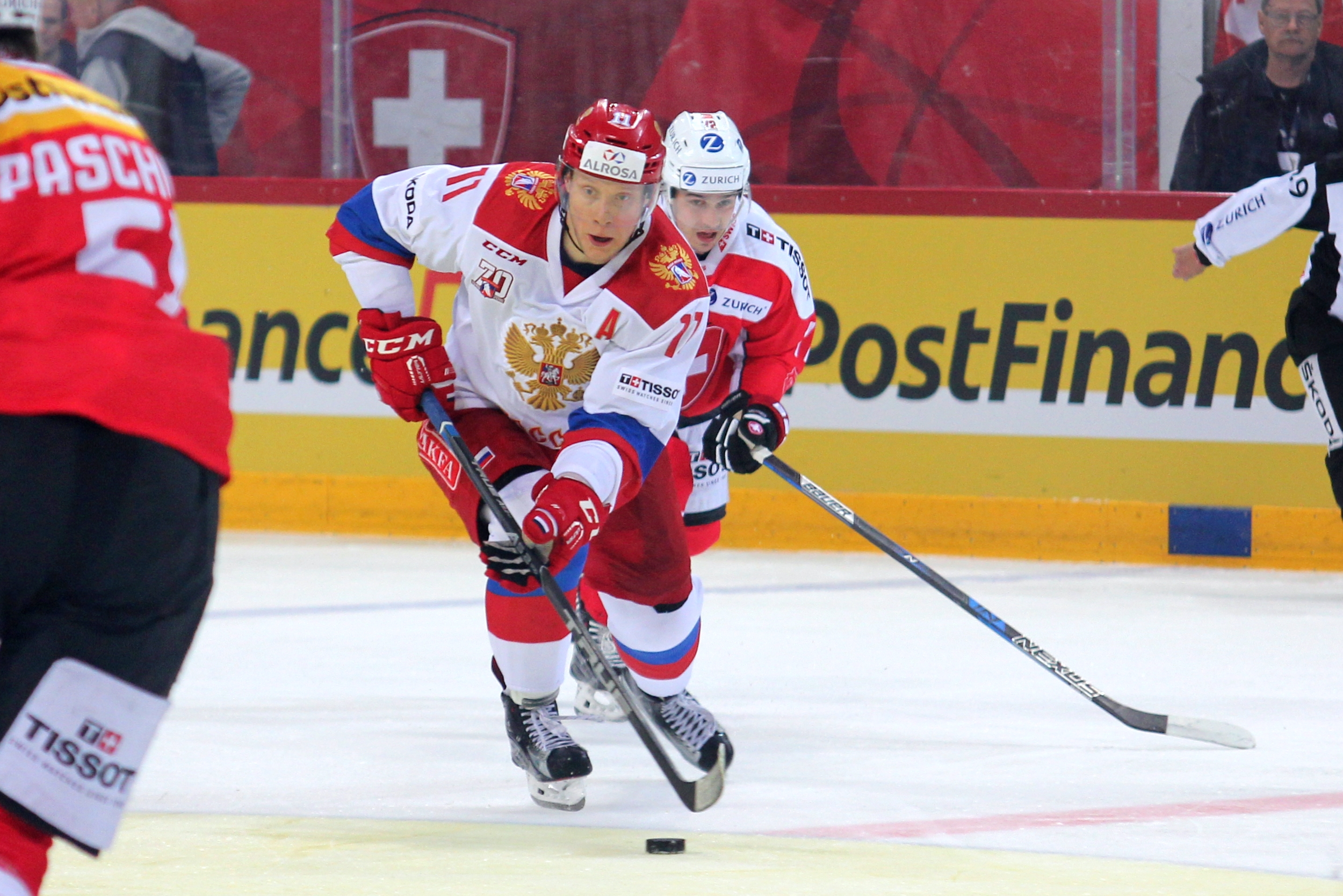
- Andronov in 2017
- Born: 19 July 1989 (age 36) Penza, Russian SFSR, Soviet Union
- Height: 6 ft 2 in (188 cm)
- Weight: 212 lb (96 kg; 15 st 2 lb)
- Position: Right wing
- Shot: Left
- Played for: Lada Togliatti; CSKA Moscow; Lokomotiv Yaroslavl; SKA Saint Petersburg
- National team: Russia
- NHL draft: 78th overall, 2009; St. Louis Blues
- Playing career: 2007–2025

Sergei Vladimirovich Andronov (Russian: Сергей Владимирович Андронов) (born 19 July 1989) is a Russian former professional ice hockey player. He most recently played for SKA Saint Petersburg of the Kontinental Hockey League (KHL). He previously played in the KHL with Lada Togliatti, CSKA Moscow and Lokomotiv Yaroslavl.

== Playing career ==
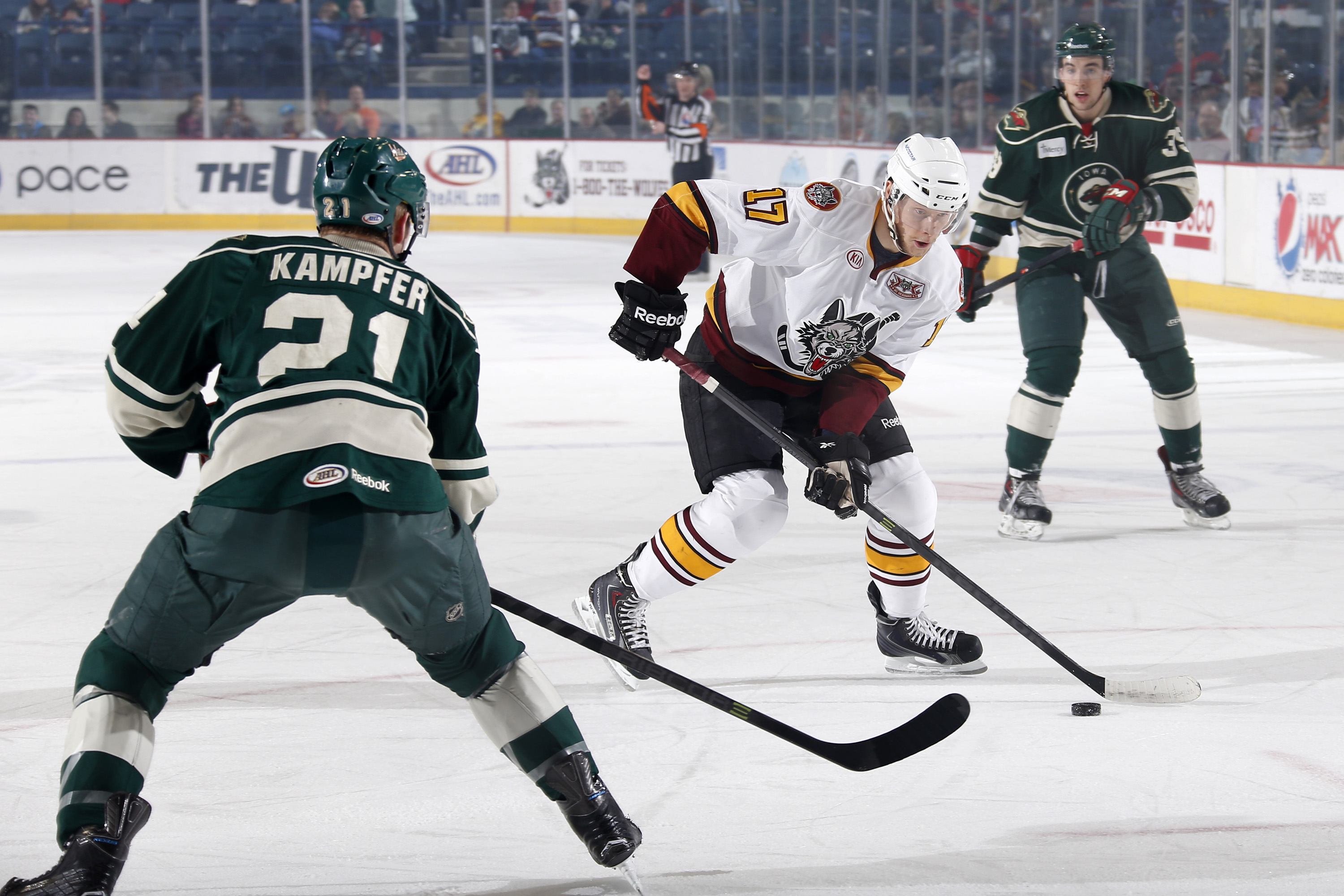
Andronov (center) carrying the puck for the Chicago Wolves of the AHL in April 2014, being guarded by Steven Kampfer of the Iowa Wild (left)

Andronov was drafted by the St. Louis Blues in the third round (#78 overall) of the 2009 NHL draft. On 28 August 2012, Andronov came to North America and signed a one-year AHL contract with the Peoria Rivermen, affiliate of the St. Louis Blues. On 24 March 2013, he signed a one-year, two-way deal with the Blues.

As a restricted free agent at the expiration of his contract with the Blues, Andronov opted to return to his former club, HC CSKA Moscow of the KHL, on 4 August 2014.

Following 11 seasons with CSKA, captaining the club to the Gagarin Cup on two occasions, Andronov left the club and signed as a free agent to a two-year contract with Lokomotiv Yaroslavl on 24 May 2022.

Andronov captained Lokomotiv during his two-year tenure with the club, helping the club return to the Gagarin Cup finals in the 2023–24 season. On 20 June 2024, Andronov left as a free agent to sign a lucrative two-year contract with SKA Saint Petersburg.

Following a lone season with SKA and approaching his final season under contract with SKA, Andronov was traded alongside Dmitri Yudin to Salavat Yulaev Ufa in exchange for a prospect and financial compensation on 25 July 2025. He was later released from the remaining year of his contract with Salavat on 1 August 2025.

On 6 January 2026, Andronov announced his retirement.

== International play ==
Andronov has played for Russia in the World Junior Championships and the World Championships. He served as an assistant captain on the Olympic Athletes from Russia team that won the gold medal at the 2018 Winter Olympics.

On 23 January 2022, Andronov was named to the roster to represent Russian Olympic Committee athletes at the 2022 Winter Olympics.

== Career statistics ==
=== Regular season and playoffs ===
			Regular season					Playoffs
Season	Team	League	GP	G	A	Pts	PIM	GP	G	A	Pts	PIM
2004–05	Dizel–2 Penza	RUS.3	3	0	0	0	0	—	—	—	—	—
2004–05	Lada–2 Togliatti	RUS.3	9	0	0	0	2	—	—	—	—	—
2005–06	Lada–2 Togliatti	RUS.3	22	5	3	8	0	—	—	—	—	—
2006–07	Lada Togliatti	RSL	3	0	0	0	2	—	—	—	—	—
2007–08	Lada Togliatti	RSL	38	2	5	7	2	4	1	0	1	6
2007–08	Lada–2 Togliatti	RUS.3	16	10	2	12	16	8	7	2	9	0
2008–09	Lada Togliatti	KHL	47	8	5	13	22	5	0	1	1	8
2008–09	Lada–2 Togliatti	RUS.3	7	5	3	8	6	3	0	2	2	32
2009–10	Lada Togliatti	KHL	33	5	9	14	20	—	—	—	—	—
2009–10	CSKA Moscow	KHL	19	5	3	8	6	3	0	0	0	0
2010–11	CSKA Moscow	KHL	53	5	2	7	14	—	—	—	—	—
2011–12	CSKA Moscow	KHL	29	1	3	4	4	5	1	0	1	0
2012–13	Peoria Rivermen	AHL	59	8	11	19	32	—	—	—	—	—
2013–14	Chicago Wolves	AHL	53	13	13	26	24	5	0	0	0	2
2014–15	CSKA Moscow	KHL	45	6	6	12	22	—	—	—	—	—
2015–16	CSKA Moscow	KHL	51	7	5	12	35	18	2	1	3	31
2016–17	CSKA Moscow	KHL	51	6	4	10	29	10	2	0	2	18
2017–18	CSKA Moscow	KHL	41	3	5	8	53	21	5	3	8	22
2018–19	CSKA Moscow	KHL	48	8	4	12	16	19	3	0	3	12
2019–20	CSKA Moscow	KHL	20	1	1	2	0	—	—	—	—	—
2020–21	CSKA Moscow	KHL	54	15	10	25	19	23	1	1	2	6
2021–22	CSKA Moscow	KHL	46	6	2	8	12	12	1	0	1	4
2022–23	Lokomotiv Yaroslavl	KHL	66	6	9	15	28	12	0	0	0	4
2023–24	Lokomotiv Yaroslavl	KHL	59	7	11	18	14	20	1	1	2	0
2024–25	SKA Saint Petersburg	KHL	36	1	3	4	12	4	0	0	0	2
KHL totals			698	90	82	172	306	152	16	7	23	107

Medal record

Ice hockey

Representing Olympic Athletes from Russia

Olympic Games
Gold medal – first place	2018 Pyeongchang	

Representing ROC

Olympic Games
Silver medal – second place	2022 Beijing	

Representing Russia

World Championships
Bronze medal – third place	2017 Germany/France	
Bronze medal – third place	2019 Slovakia	

World Junior Championships
Bronze medal – third place	2009 Ottawa	

World U18 Championships
Gold medal – first place	2007 Finland	

=== International ===
Year	Team	Event	Result	GP	G	A	Pts	PIM
2007	Russia	WJC18	1st place, gold medalist(s)	7	0	2	2	0
2009	Russia	WJC	3rd place, bronze medalist(s)	7	3	5	8	2
2017	Russia	WC	3rd place, bronze medalist(s)	10	3	2	5	4
2018	OAR	OG	1st place, gold medalist(s)	6	0	4	4	4
2018	Russia	WC	6th	7	1	0	1	4
2019	Russia	WC	3rd place, bronze medalist(s)	10	1	0	1	6
2022	ROC	OG	2nd place, silver medalist(s)	6	0	1	1	2
Junior totals				14	3	7	10	2
Senior totals				39	5	7	12	20

== Awards and honors ==
Award	Year
KHL
Gagarin Cup (CSKA Moscow)	2019, 2022
