= Nikolai Prokhorkin =

Russian ice hockey player (born 1993)

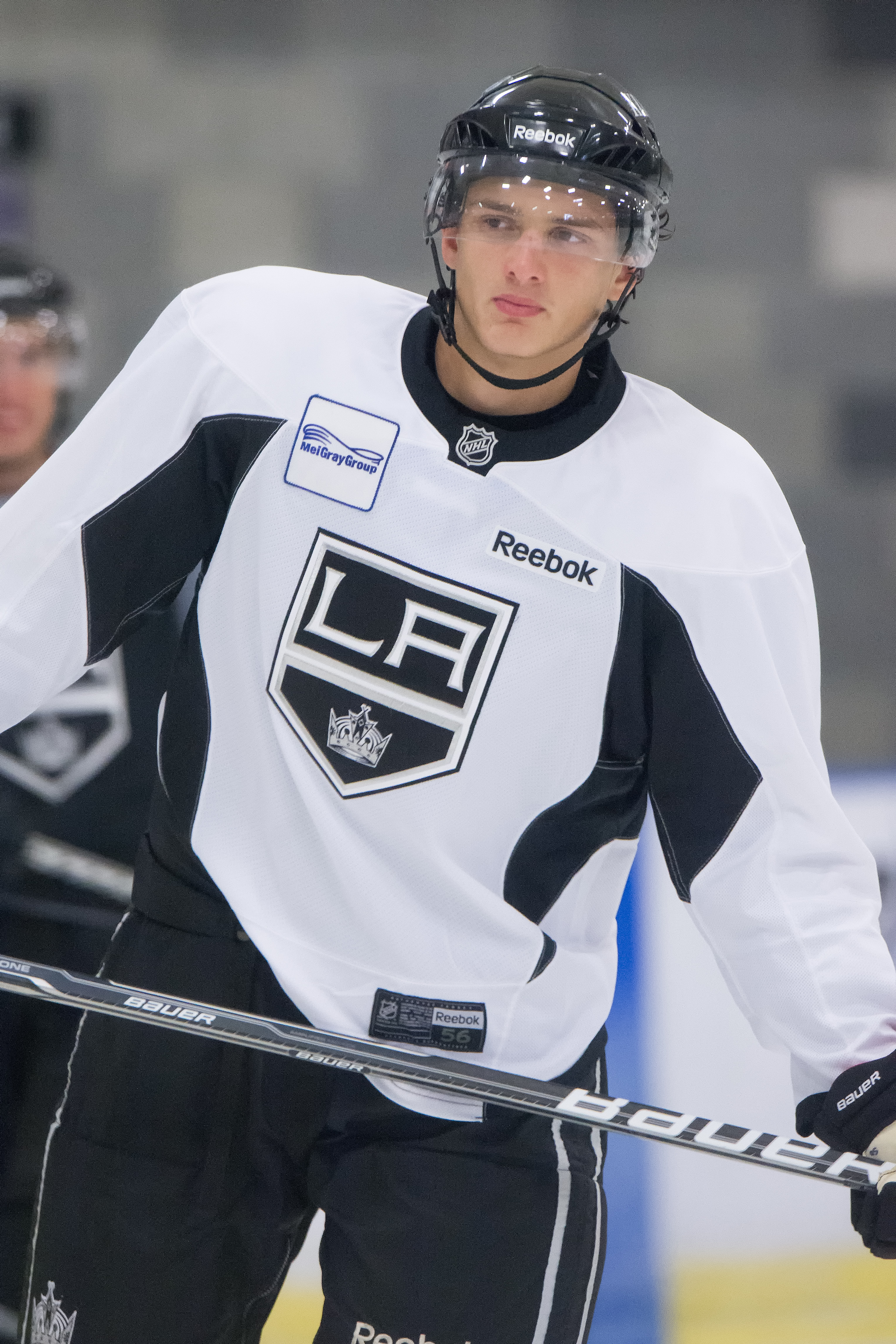
- Prokhorkin practicing with the Los Angeles Kings in 2012
- Born: 17 September 1993 (age 33) Chelyabinsk, Russia
- Height: 6 ft 2 in (188 cm)
- Weight: 183 lb (83 kg; 13 st 1 lb)
- Position: Forward
- Shoots: Left
- KHL team Former teams: Avangard Omsk; CSKA Moscow; Salavat Yulaev Ufa; SKA Saint Petersburg; Los Angeles Kings; Metallurg Magnitogorsk; Sibir Novosibirsk
- National team: Russia
- NHL draft: 121st overall, 2012; Los Angeles Kings
- Playing career: 2011–present

Nikolai Nikolayevich Prokhorkin (Russian: Николай Николаевич Прохоркин) (born 17 September 1993) is a Russian professional ice hockey forward for Avangard Omsk of the Kontinental Hockey League (KHL).

== Playing career ==
He was drafted by the Los Angeles Kings, 121st overall in the 2012 NHL entry draft. On 5 September 2012, Prokhorkin was signed by the Kings to a three-year entry-level contract. After attending the Kings training camp, Prokhorkin was assigned to American Hockey League affiliate, the Manchester Monarchs. He featured in 8 games with the Monarchs to begin the 2012–13 season, before opting to return to his original club, CSKA Moscow, and terminate his contract with the Kings on 14 November 2012. In 2015, he transferred to powerhouse SKA Saint Petersburg where he won a Gagarin Cup in 2017.

On 13 May 2019, Prokhorkin as a free agent signed a one-year, entry-level contract with draft club, the Los Angeles Kings. In his lone North American season in 2019–20, Prokhorkin was originally assigned to play with the Kings' AHL affiliate, the Ontario Reign. He made 4 appearances with the Reign before he was recalled to make his long-awaited debut in the NHL. Remaining with the Kings throughout the season, Prokhorkin collected 4 goals and 14 points in 43 games in a bottom-six role, before the season was halted due to the COVID-19 pandemic.

With the Kings out of playoff contention and unable to participate in the return to play stage, Prokhorkin, as an impending restricted free agent, opted to return to his homeland, agreeing to a two-year contract with Metallurg Magnitogorsk on 20 July 2020. He was signed by Metallurg after his KHL rights' were earlier acquired from SKA Saint Petersburg in exchange for Vladislav Kamenev on 11 June 2020.

Following a lone season with Metallurg and entering the 2021–22 season, Prokhorkin was traded by Magnitogorsk to defending champions, Avangard Omsk in exchange for Denis Zernov on 30 August 2021.

On 1 May 2022, Prokhorkin, as a free agent, returned to his former club, SKA Saint Petersburg, by signing a three-year contract.

== International play ==
Prokhorkin is a member of the Olympic Athletes from Russia team at the 2018 Winter Olympics.

== Career statistics ==
=== Regular season and playoffs ===
			Regular season					Playoffs
Season	Team	League	GP	G	A	Pts	PIM	GP	G	A	Pts	PIM
2010–11	CSKA Moscow	KHL	6	0	0	0	0	—	—	—	—	—
2010–11	Krasnaya Armiya Moscow	MHL	46	23	17	40	42	16	3	5	8	10
2011–12	CSKA Moscow	KHL	15	1	1	2	4	4	0	1	1	2
2011–12	Krasnaya Armiya Moscow	MHL	15	9	17	26	47	16	2	9	11	14
2012–13	Manchester Monarchs	AHL	8	0	1	1	6	—	—	—	—	—
2012–13	CSKA Moscow	KHL	14	2	1	3	10	9	3	1	4	0
2012–13	THK Tver	VHL	5	2	2	4	4	—	—	—	—	—
2013–14	CSKA Moscow	KHL	52	19	18	37	47	4	1	1	2	16
2014–15	Buran Voronezh	VHL	7	1	0	1	4	—	—	—	—	—
2014–15	CSKA Moscow	KHL	41	9	11	20	15	4	0	0	0	2
2015–16	Salavat Yulaev Ufa	KHL	55	19	17	36	91	19	2	5	7	18
2016–17	SKA Saint Petersburg	KHL	43	6	8	14	47	16	3	5	8	12
2017–18	SKA Saint Petersburg	KHL	47	16	17	33	24	4	1	1	2	4
2018–19	SKA Saint Petersburg	KHL	41	20	21	41	10	11	2	4	6	4
2019–20	Ontario Reign	AHL	4	0	2	2	2	—	—	—	—	—
2019–20	Los Angeles Kings	NHL	43	4	10	14	6	—	—	—	—	—
2020–21	Metallurg Magnitogorsk	KHL	45	12	14	26	26	12	3	5	8	24
2021–22	Avangard Omsk	KHL	41	10	11	21	4	13	5	2	7	6
2022–23	SKA Saint Petersburg	KHL	3	0	1	1	0	7	1	3	4	2
2023–24	Sibir Novosibirsk	KHL	39	8	16	24	41	—	—	—	—	—
2023–24	Avangard Omsk	KHL	26	10	9	19	12	12	2	3	5	2
2024–25	Avangard Omsk	KHL	40	11	20	31	6	13	2	5	7	10
2025–26	Avangard Omsk	KHL	63	18	19	37	23	17	5	5	10	4
KHL totals			571	161	184	345	360	145	30	41	71	106
NHL totals			43	4	10	14	6	—	—	—	—	—

Medal record

Ice hockey

Representing Olympic Athletes from Russia

Olympic Games
Gold medal – first place	2018 Pyeongchang	

=== International ===
Year	Team	Event	Result	GP	G	A	Pts	PIM
2018	OAR	OG	1st place, gold medalist(s)	6	2	0	2	2
Senior totals				6	2	0	2	2

== Awards and honors ==
Award	Year
KHL
All-Star Game	2014
Gagarin Cup	2017
