= Killick (name) =

Name list

== Given name ==
- Killick Erik Hinds (born 1972), American musician
- Killick Millard (1870–1952), British doctor

== Surname ==
- Anthony Killick (1829–1881), English cricketer
- Beatrice Dorothy Harriet Killick (1855–1947), writer, restaurateur, and activist
- Dewi Sandra Killick (born 1980), Indonesian singer and model
- Elizabeth Killick (1924–2019), British naval engineer
- Ernest Harry "Tim" Killick (1875–1948), English cricketer
- Esther Killick (1902–1960), English physiologist
- Gordon Killick (1899–1962), British rower
- Graeme Killick, Canadian cross country skier
- Hammerton Killick (1856–1902), former admiral in the Haitian Navy
- Harry Killick (1837–1877), English cricketer
- James Killick (1816–1889) British sea captain, shipowner and entrepreneur
- Jennifer Killick, English children's writer
- Sir John Killick (1919–2004), British ambassador
- Larry Killick (1922–2013), American basketball player
- Marie Killick (1914–2000), English audio engineer
- Paul Killick, British professional ballroom dancer
- Rebecca Killick, British statistician
- Tim Killick (born 1958), English actor
- Tom Killick (1907–1953), English cricketer and clergyman
- William Killick (1855–1938), English cricketer
- Killick (Kent cricketer), English cricketer from the mid-18th century

== Fiction ==
- Preserved Killick, steward to Jack Aubrey throughout the Aubrey–Maturin series of novels by Patrick O'Brian

== See also ==
- Killick (disambiguation)
