= Canada at the 2018 Winter Olympics =

- Flag of Canada
- IOC code: CAN
- NOC: Canadian Olympic Committee
- Website: www.olympic.ca (in English and French)

in Pyeongchang, South Korea February 9–25, 2018
- Competitors: 225 (122 men and 103 women) in 14 sports
- Flag bearers: Tessa Virtue & Scott Moir (opening); Kim Boutin (closing)
- Medals Ranked 3rd: Gold 11 Silver 8 Bronze 10 Total 29

Winter Olympics appearances (overview)
- 1924; 1928; 1932; 1936; 1948; 1952; 1956; 1960; 1964; 1968; 1972; 1976; 1980; 1984; 1988; 1992; 1994; 1998; 2002; 2006; 2010; 2014; 2018; 2022; 2026

Canada competed at the 2018 Winter Olympics in Pyeongchang, South Korea, from February 9 to 25, 2018. It was the nation's 23rd appearance at the Winter Olympics, having competed at every Games since their inception in 1924. Canada competed in all sports disciplines, except Nordic combined. The chef de mission was Isabelle Charest, who was appointed in February 2017.

On January 16, 2018, figure skaters Tessa Virtue and Scott Moir were announced as the country's flag bearers during the opening ceremony. This was the first time two athletes were named as Canada's opening ceremony flag bearer. On February 24, 2018, short track speed skater Kim Boutin was named the flag bearer for the closing ceremony.

Instead of setting a specific medal count as a target, the Canadian Olympic Committee aimed "to contend for No. 1" in the medal count. Private data analytics company Gracenote projected that the Canadian team would win 28 medals. Canada finished with 11 gold medals and 29 overall (ranking 3rd in both categories). This was the most successful Canadian performance in terms of overall medals, surpassing the 26 won at the 2010 Winter Olympics.

For the first time since its official introduction at the 1998 Winter Olympics, Canada failed to medal in men's and women's curling, but did win gold in mixed doubles curling, a category making its Olympic debut.

== History ==
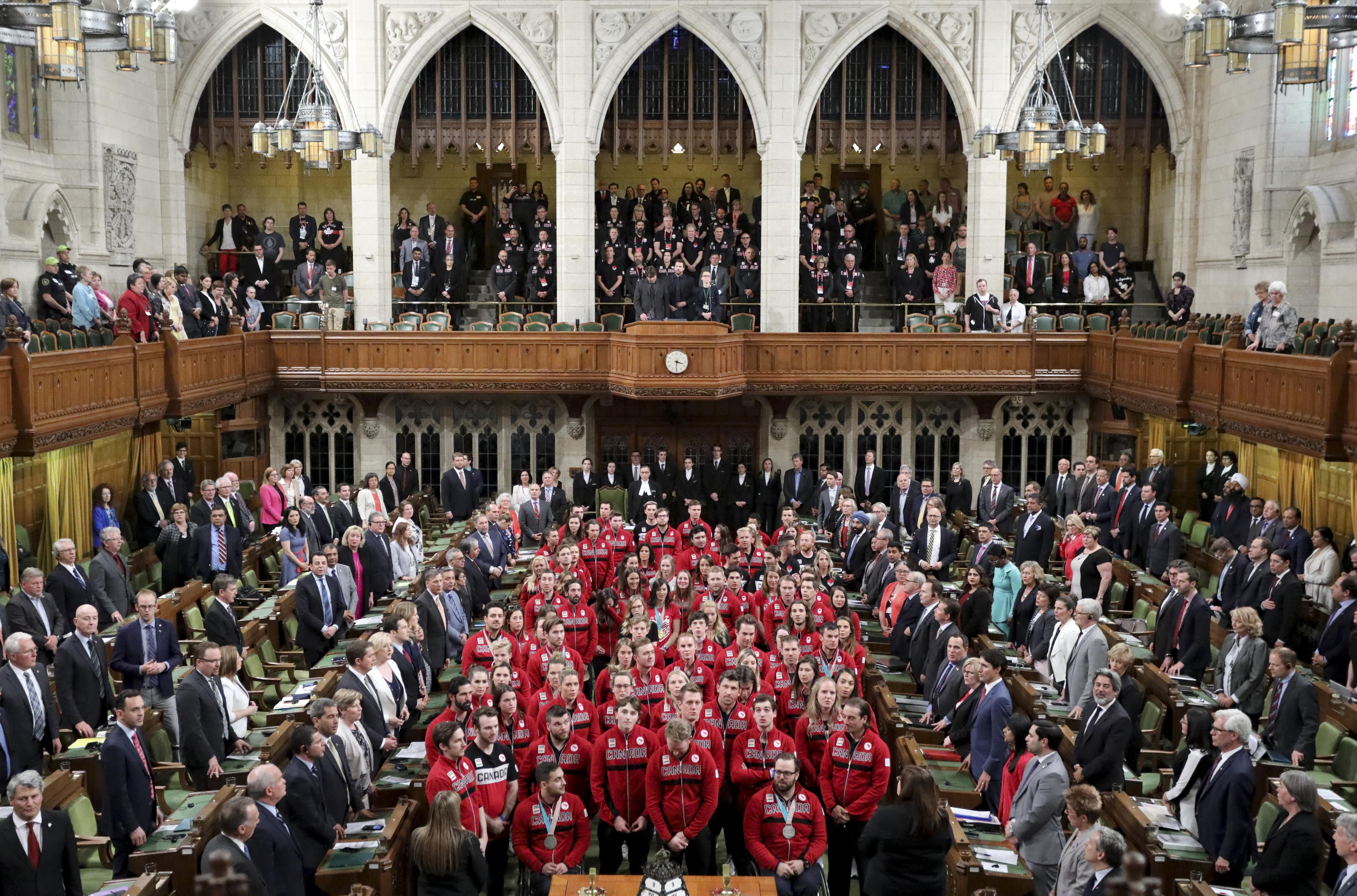
Canadian Paralympic and Olympic athletes in the House of Commons of Canada.

On Day 2 of the Games, Mark McMorris won the bronze medal in the men's slopestyle. This was eleven months after the snowboarder ended up in a coma.

Pairs skater Eric Radford became the first openly gay man to win a gold medal at any Winter Olympics, as part of the Canadian team that won the team figure skating competition. A corner of Canada Olympic House was set aside as Pride House for the duration of the Olympics.

Alex Gough won Canada's first ever permanent luge medal on February 13. She had been part of the 2014 luge relay team which briefly won a previous Olympic bronze due to a Russian doping disqualification, but that finding had been overturned on appeal.

On February 23, Canada broke its record for most ever Winter Olympic medals, previously at 26, with figure skater Kaetlyn Osmond winning the 27th medal.

A day before the closing ceremony, on February 24, Canada won its 28th medal when Sebastien Toutant took gold in the first ever "big air" competition in snowboarding. That medal was Canada's 500th Olympic medal (not counting two medals (gold and silver) at the 1906 Olympic Games).

Canada maintained its record for the most gold medals at a single Games—14 at Vancouver 2010—and now shares the honor with Norway and Germany, which equalled that mark at these Games.

== Medalists ==
Medals by sport
Sport	1st place, gold medalist(s)	2nd place, silver medalist(s)	3rd place, bronze medalist(s)	Total
Freestyle skiing	4	2	1	7
Figure skating	2	0	2	4
Short track speed skating	1	1	3	5
Speed skating	1	1	0	2
Bobsleigh	1	0	1	2
Curling	1	0	0	1
Snowboarding	1	2	1	4
Luge	0	1	1	2
Ice hockey	0	1	1	2
Total	11	8	10	29

Medals by date
Day	Date	1st place, gold medalist(s)	2nd place, silver medalist(s)	3rd place, bronze medalist(s)	Total
Day 1	February 10	0	0	0	0
Day 2	February 11	0	3	1	4
Day 3	February 12	2	1	0	3
Day 4	February 13	1	0	2	3
Day 5	February 14	0	0	0	0
Day 6	February 15	1	1	1	3
Day 7	February 16	0	0	0	0
Day 8	February 17	1	0	1	2
Day 9	February 18	0	0	1	1
Day 10	February 19	1	0	0	1
Day 11	February 20	2	0	0	2
Day 12	February 21	1	0	1	2
Day 13	February 22	0	2	1	3
Day 14	February 23	1	1	1	3
Day 15	February 24	1	0	1	2
Day 16	February 25	0	0	0	0
Total		11	8	10	29

Medals by gender
Gender	1st place, gold medalist(s)	2nd place, silver medalist(s)	3rd place, bronze medalist(s)	Total
Male	6	2	4	12
Female	2	5	5	12
Mixed	3	1	1	5
Total	11	8	10	29

Multiple medalists
Name	Sport	1st place, gold medalist(s)	2nd place, silver medalist(s)	3rd place, bronze medalist(s)	Total
Scott Moir	Figure skating	2	0	0	2
Tessa Virtue	Figure skating	2	0	0	2
Ted-Jan Bloemen	Speed skating	1	1	0	2
Meagan Duhamel	Figure skating	1	0	1	2
Samuel Girard	Short track speed skating	1	0	1	2
Kaetlyn Osmond	Figure skating	1	0	1	2
Eric Radford	Figure skating	1	0	1	2
Kim Boutin	Short track speed skating	0	1	2	3
Alex Gough	Luge	0	1	1	2

Medal	Name	Sport	Event	Date
Gold	Patrick Chan; Kaetlyn Osmond; Gabrielle Daleman; Meagan Duhamel; Eric Radford; Tessa Virtue; Scott Moir	Figure skating	Team event	February 12
Gold	Mikaël Kingsbury	Freestyle skiing	Men's moguls	February 12
Gold	Kaitlyn Lawes; John Morris	Curling	Mixed doubles	February 13
Gold	Ted-Jan Bloemen	Speed skating	Men's 10,000 metres	February 15
Gold	Samuel Girard	Short track speed skating	Men's 1000 metres	February 17
Gold	Justin Kripps; Alexander Kopacz	Bobsleigh	Two-man	February 19
Gold	Cassie Sharpe	Freestyle skiing	Women's halfpipe	February 20
Gold	Tessa Virtue; Scott Moir	Figure skating	Ice dancing	February 20
Gold	Brady Leman	Freestyle skiing	Men's ski cross	February 21
Gold	Kelsey Serwa	Freestyle skiing	Women's ski cross	February 23
Gold	Sébastien Toutant	Snowboarding	Men's big air	February 24
Silver	Maxence Parrot	Snowboarding	Men's slopestyle	February 11
Silver	Ted-Jan Bloemen	Speed skating	Men's 5000 metres	February 11
Silver	Justine Dufour-Lapointe	Freestyle skiing	Women's moguls	February 11
Silver	Laurie Blouin	Snowboarding	Women's slopestyle	February 12
Silver	Alex Gough; Samuel Edney; Tristan Walker; Justin Snith	Luge	Team relay	February 15
Silver	Canada women's national ice hockey team: Meghan Agosta; Bailey Bram; Emily Clark; Mélodie Daoust; Ann-Renée Desbiens; Renata Fast; Laura Fortino; Haley Irwin; Brianne Jenner; Rebecca Johnston; Geneviève Lacasse; Brigette Lacquette; Jocelyne Larocque; Meaghan Mikkelson; Sarah Nurse; Marie-Philip Poulin; Lauriane Rougeau; Jillian Saulnier; Natalie Spooner; Laura Stacey; Shannon Szabados; Blayre Turnbull; Jenn Wakefield	Ice hockey	Women's tournament	February 22
Silver	Kim Boutin	Short track speed skating	Women's 1000 metres	February 22
Silver	Brittany Phelan	Freestyle skiing	Women's ski cross	February 23
Bronze	Mark McMorris	Snowboarding	Men's slopestyle	February 11
Bronze	Kim Boutin	Short track speed skating	Women's 500 metres	February 13
Bronze	Alex Gough	Luge	Women's singles	February 13
Bronze	Meagan Duhamel; Eric Radford	Figure skating	Pairs	February 15
Bronze	Kim Boutin	Short track speed skating	Women's 1500 metres	February 17
Bronze	Alex Beaulieu-Marchand	Freestyle skiing	Men's slopestyle	February 18
Bronze	Kaillie Humphries; Phylicia George	Bobsleigh	Two-woman	February 21
Bronze	Samuel Girard; Charles Hamelin; Charle Cournoyer; Pascal Dion	Short track speed skating	Men's 5000 metre relay	February 22
Bronze	Kaetlyn Osmond	Figure skating	Ladies' singles	February 23
Bronze	Canada men's national ice hockey team: Rene Bourque; Gilbert Brulé; Andrew Ebbett; Stefan Elliott; Chay Genoway; Cody Goloubef; Marc-André Gragnani; Quinton Howden; Chris Kelly; Rob Klinkhammer; Brandon Kozun; Maxim Lapierre; Chris Lee; Maxim Noreau; Eric O'Dell; Justin Peters; Kevin Poulin; Mason Raymond; Mat Robinson; Derek Roy; Ben Scrivens; Karl Stollery; Christian Thomas; Linden Vey; Wojtek Wolski	Ice hockey	Men's tournament	February 24

== Competitors ==
The following is the list of number of competitors participating at the Games per sport/discipline.

Sport	Men	Women	Total
Alpine skiing	8	5	13
Biathlon	5	5	10
Bobsleigh	12	6	18
Cross-country skiing	7	4	11
Curling	6	6	12
Figure skating	8	9	17
Freestyle skiing	16	14	30
Ice hockey	25	23	48
Luge	5	3	8
Short track speed skating	5	5	10
Skeleton	3	3	6
Ski jumping	1	1	2
Snowboarding	11	10	21
Speed skating	10	9	19
Total	122	103	225

== Alpine skiing ==
Canada qualified a total of 15 male and female athletes for alpine skiing. However they declined one spot. On January 31, 2018 Alpine Canada announced that Erik Guay was not able to return to health due to continuing severe back pain. Therefore, he will not compete at the upcoming Winter Olympics.

Men

Athlete	Event	Run 1		Run 2		Total	
Athlete	Event	Time	Rank	Time	Rank	Time	Rank
Philip Brown	Giant slalom	1:11.30	25	1:10.38	9	2:21.51	18
Philip Brown	Slalom	50.22	26	51.72	21	1:41.94	22
Dustin Cook	Downhill	—N/a				1:43.80	32
Dustin Cook	Super-G	—N/a				1:25.23	9
James Crawford	Combined	1:21.97	37	48.80	17	2:10.77	20
James Crawford	Giant slalom	1:11.74	31	1:12.38	30	2:24.12	29
James Crawford	Super-G	—N/a				DNF	
Manuel Osborne-Paradis	Combined	DNF					
Manuel Osborne-Paradis	Downhill	—N/a				1:41.89	14
Manuel Osborne-Paradis	Super-G	—N/a				1:26.39	22
Trevor Philp	Giant slalom	1:11.13	24	1:11.25	23	2:22.55	27
Trevor Philp	Slalom	49.95	25	DNF			
Erik Read	Giant slalom	1:10.18	16	1:10.56	15	2:20.74	11
Erik Read	Slalom	49.81	23	58.74	34	1:48.55	29
Broderick Thompson	Combined	1:21.75	33	49.63	23	2:11.38	23
Broderick Thompson	Downhill	—N/a				1:44.37	35
Broderick Thompson	Super-G	—N/a				1:26.45	23
Benjamin Thomsen	Combined	1:21.36	26	DNS		DNF	
Benjamin Thomsen	Downhill	—N/a				1:43.19	28

Women

Athlete	Event	Run 1		Run 2		Total	
Athlete	Event	Time	Rank	Time	Rank	Time	Rank
Candace Crawford	Combined	DNF					
Candace Crawford	Downhill	—N/a				DNF	
Candace Crawford	Giant slalom	1:14.70	30	1:10.46	22	2:25.16	25
Candace Crawford	Super-G	—N/a				1:23.69	29
Valérie Grenier	Combined	1:41.79	8	41.65	8	2:23.44	6
Valérie Grenier	Downhill	—N/a				1:42.13	21
Valérie Grenier	Giant slalom	1:15.74	33	DNF			
Valérie Grenier	Super-G	—N/a				1:22.77	23
Erin Mielzynski	Slalom	51.83	22	49.66	3	1:41.49	11
Roni Remme	Combined	DNF					
Roni Remme	Downhill	—N/a				1:42.80	23
Roni Remme	Slalom	52.43	29	51.18	23	1:43.61	27
Roni Remme	Super-G	—N/a				1:25.90	37
Laurence St-Germain	Slalom	50.94	11	50.86	20	1:41.80	15

Mixed

Athlete	Event	Round of 16	Quarterfinals	Semifinals	Final / BM	
Athlete	Event	Opposition Result	Opposition Result	Opposition Result	Opposition Result	Rank
Philip Brown; Trevor Philp; Erik Read; Candace Crawford; Erin Mielzynski; Laurence St-Germain	Team	France; L 2–2*	Did not advance			

== Biathlon ==
Based on their Nations Cup rankings in the 2016–17 Biathlon World Cup, Canada qualified five men and five women. The official team of ten athletes was named on January 16, 2018.

Men

Athlete	Event	Time	Misses	Rank
Christian Gow	Individual	51:01.0	2 (1+0+0+1)	26
Christian Gow	Sprint	25:52.8	3 (2+1)	62
Scott Gow	Individual	50:06.3	1 (0+0+0+1)	14
Scott Gow	Sprint	25:53.5	4 (4+0)	61
Brendan Green	Individual	50:30.4	1 (0+0+0+1)	22
Brendan Green	Sprint	26:48.0	3 (0+3)	82
Nathan Smith	Individual	56:15.7	5 (0+1+4+0)	81
Nathan Smith	Pursuit	38:58.2	4 (0+0+1+3)	54
Nathan Smith	Sprint	25:22.3	1 (1+0)	44
Macx Davies; Christian Gow; Scott Gow; Brendan Green	Team relay	1:20:56.8	12 (1+11)	11

Women

Athlete	Event	Time	Misses	Rank
Sarah Beaudry	Individual	45:05.6	1 (0+1+0+0)	29
Rosanna Crawford	Individual	44:55.9	2 (2+0+0+0)	26
Rosanna Crawford	Pursuit	33:03.0	2 (0+0+1+1)	19
Rosanna Crawford	Sprint	23:29.2	3 (1+2)	53
Emma Lunder	Individual	46:56.6	3 (0+1+1+1)	54
Emma Lunder	Pursuit	36:52.1	4 (0+1+1+2)	53
Emma Lunder	Sprint	23:30.4	2 (0+2)	54
Julia Ransom	Individual	49:38.9	5 (1+1+2+1)	74
Julia Ransom	Pursuit	33:38.3	1 (0+0+0+1)	28
Julia Ransom	Sprint	23:15.0	1 (0+1)	40
Megan Tandy	Pursuit	DNS		
Megan Tandy	Sprint	23:42.8	2 (1+1)	57
Sarah Beaudry; Julia Ransom; Emma Lunder; Rosanna Crawford	Team relay	1:13:36.8	12 (1+11)	10

Mixed

Athlete	Event	Time	Misses	Rank
Christian Gow; Brendan Green; Rosanna Crawford; Julia Ransom	Team relay	1:11:11.0	9 (2+7)	12

== Bobsleigh ==
Canada qualified a full team of three sleds in the two-man, four-man and women's bobsleigh competitions each. The team will consist of 18 athletes, and also marked the largest bobsleigh team the country has ever sent to the Winter Olympics. The official team was named on January 24, 2018.

Men

Athlete	Event	Run 1		Run 2		Run 3		Run 4		Total	
Athlete	Event	Time	Rank	Time	Rank	Time	Rank	Time	Rank	Time	Rank
Justin Kripps * Alex Kopacz	Two-man	49.10	2	49.39	3	49.09	3	49.28	3	3:16.86	1st place, gold medalist(s)
Nick Poloniato * Jesse Lumsden	Two-man	49.48	10	49.48	7	49.33	6	49.45	6	3:17.74	7
Christopher Spring * Lascelles Brown	Two-man	49.38	8	49.58	13	49.56	15	49.72	15	3:18.24	10
Justin Kripps * Alex Kopacz; Jesse Lumsden; Oluseyi Smith	Four-man	48.85	5	49.28	9	48.95	6	49.61	8	3:16.69	6
Christopher Spring * Neville Wright; Cam Stones; Joshua Kirkpatrick	Four-man	49.06	9	49.58	17	49.46	12	49.86	19	3:17.96	16
Nick Poloniato * Lascelles Brown; Bryan Barnett; Ben Coakwell	Four-man	49.40	17	49.23	6	49.51	14	49.67	11	3:17.81	12

* – Denotes the driver of each sled

- Sam Giguere and Joey Nemet will serve as the team's alternates.

Women

Athlete	Event	Run 1		Run 2		Run 3		Run 4		Total	
Athlete	Event	Time	Rank	Time	Rank	Time	Rank	Time	Rank	Time	Rank
Kaillie Humphries * Phylicia George	Two-woman	50.72	5	50.88	3	50.52	3	50.77	4	3:22.89	3rd place, bronze medalist(s)
Alysia Rissling * Heather Moyse	Two-woman	50.81	7	50.95	7	50.83	7	51.04	6	3:23.63	6
Christine de Bruin * Melissa Lotholz	Two-woman	50.94	9	50.91	4	50.75	6	51.29	12	3:23.89	7

* – Denotes the driver of each sled

- Cynthia Appiah and Kristen Bujnowski will serve as the team's alternates.

== Cross-country skiing ==
Canada qualified a total of 8 male and female athletes for cross-country skiing and receive three additional quota places based on the reallocation process. Seven male and four female competitors were announced on January 29.

Distance
Men

Athlete	Event	Classical		Freestyle		Final		
Athlete	Event	Time	Rank	Time	Rank	Time	Deficit	Rank
Alex Harvey	15 km freestyle	—N/a				34:19.4	+35.5	7
Knute Johnsgaard	15 km freestyle	—N/a				37:48.5	+4:04.6	69
Devon Kershaw	15 km freestyle	—N/a				38:01.5	+4:17.6	71
Graeme Killick	15 km freestyle	—N/a				36:23.3	+2:39.4	38
Alex Harvey	30 km skiathlon	40:31.4	4	35:54.7	14	1:16:53.4	+33.4	8
Knute Johnsgaard	30 km skiathlon	45:49.7	63	LAP				
Devon Kershaw	30 km skiathlon	41:14.8	27	38:07.6	41	1:19:55.3	+3:35.3	36
Graeme Killick	30 km skiathlon	42:29.4	42	38:34.5	48	1:21:39.6	+5:19.6	45
Alex Harvey	50 km classical	—N/a				2:11:05.7	+2:43.6	4
Russell Kennedy	50 km classical	—N/a				2:25:16.6	+16:54.5	49
Devon Kershaw	50 km classical	—N/a				2:17:49.4	+9:27.3	26
Graeme Killick	50 km classical	—N/a				2:18:28.8	+10:06.7	27
Knute Johnsgaard; Russell Kennedy; Graeme Killick; Len Väljas	4×10 km relay	—N/a				1:36:45.9	+3:41.0	9

Women

Athlete	Event	Classical		Freestyle		Final		
Athlete	Event	Time	Rank	Time	Rank	Time	Deficit	Rank
Dahria Beatty	10 km freestyle	—N/a				27:48.9	+2:48.4	37
Cendrine Browne	10 km freestyle	—N/a				28:12.4	+3:11.9	43
Anne-Marie Comeau	10 km freestyle	—N/a				29:11.3	+4:10.8	62
Emily Nishikawa	10 km freestyle	—N/a				27:41.5	+2:41.0	32
Dahria Beatty	15 km skiathlon	23:58.9	54	21:43.0	55	46:17.3	+5:32.4	52
Cendrine Browne	15 km skiathlon	23:04.6	35	20:24.2	24	44:01.9	+3:17.0	33
Anne-Marie Comeau	15 km skiathlon	23:49.7	51	21:16.2	46	45:42.8	+4:57.9	48
Emily Nishikawa	15 km skiathlon	23:36.0	44	21:08.4	43	45:16.6	+4:31.7	44
Cendrine Browne	30 km classical	—N/a				1:41:23.9	+19:06.3	43
Anne-Marie Comeau	30 km classical	—N/a				DNF		
Emily Nishikawa	30 km classical	—N/a				1:34:31.7	+12:14.1	30
Dahria Beatty; Cendrine Browne; Anne-Marie Comeau; Emily Nishikawa	4×5 km relay	—N/a				56:14.6	+4:50.3	13

Sprint
Men

Athlete	Event	Qualification		Quarterfinal		Semifinal		Final	
Athlete	Event	Time	Rank	Time	Rank	Time	Rank	Time	Rank
Jesse Cockney	Sprint	3:18.54	35	Did not advance					
Alex Harvey	Sprint	3:17.95	32	Did not advance					
Russell Kennedy	Sprint	3:23.37	54	Did not advance					
Len Väljas	Sprint	3:17.11	26 Q	3:10.87	3 q	3:13.91	3	Did not advance	
Alex Harvey; Len Väljas	Team sprint	—N/a				16:07.24	5 q	16:31.86	8

Women

Athlete	Event	Qualification		Quarterfinal		Semifinal		Final	
Athlete	Event	Time	Rank	Time	Rank	Time	Rank	Time	Rank
Dahria Beatty	Sprint	3:29.77	42	Did not advance					
Cendrine Browne	Sprint	3:34.30	51	Did not advance					
Emily Nishikawa	Sprint	3:26.75	34	Did not advance					
Dahria Beatty; Emily Nishikawa	Team sprint	—N/a				17:01.54	7	Did not advance	

== Curling ==
Canada qualified a full team of 12 athletes (6 men and 6 women). The country will compete in all three events, including the debuting mixed doubles event. The teams and the alternates for the men's and women's tournaments were announced officially on January 8, 2017.

Summary

Team	Event	Group stage										Tiebreaker	Semifinal	Final / BM	
Team	Event	Opposition Score	Opposition Score	Opposition Score	Opposition Score	Opposition Score	Opposition Score	Opposition Score	Opposition Score	Opposition Score	Rank	Opposition Score	Opposition Score	Opposition Score	Rank
Kevin Koe; Marc Kennedy; Brent Laing; Ben Hebert; Scott Pfeifer	Men's tournament	ITA; W 5–3	GBR; W 6–4	NOR; W 7–4	KOR; W 7–6	SWE; L 2–5	SUI; L 6–8	USA; L 7–9	JPN; W 8–4	DEN; W 8–3	2 Q	BYE	USA; L 3–5	SUI; L 5–7	4
Rachel Homan; Emma Miskew; Joanne Courtney; Lisa Weagle; Cheryl Bernard	Women's tournament	KOR; L 6–8	SWE; L 6–7	DEN; L 8–9	USA; W 11–3	SUI; W 10–8	JPN; W 8–3	CHN; L 5–7	GBR; L 5–6	OAR; W 9–8	6	Did not advance			
Kaitlyn Lawes; John Morris	Mixed doubles	NOR; L 6–9	USA; W 6–4	CHN; W 10–4	FIN; W 8–2	SUI; W 7–2	OAR; W 8–2	KOR; W 7–3	—N/a		1 Q	BYE	NOR; W 8–4	SUI; W 10–3	1st place, gold medalist(s)

=== Men's tournament ===
Canada qualified a men's team by earning enough points in the last two World Curling Championships. The Olympic team was decided at the 2017 Canadian Olympic Curling Trials.

The Canadian team consists of Kevin Koe, Marc Kennedy, Brent Laing, Ben Hebert, and Scott Pfeifer.

Final round robin standings
Team	Skip	Pld	W	L	PF	PA	EW	EL	BE	SE	S%	Qualification
Sweden	Niklas Edin	9	7	2	62	43	34	28	13	8	87%	Playoffs
Canada	Kevin Koe	9	6	3	56	46	36	34	14	8	87%	Playoffs
United States	John Shuster	9	5	4	67	63	37	39	4	6	80%	Playoffs
Great Britain	Kyle Smith	9	5	4	55	60	40	37	8	7	82%	Tiebreaker
Switzerland	Peter de Cruz	9	5	4	60	55	39	37	10	6	83%	Tiebreaker
Norway	Thomas Ulsrud	9	4	5	52	56	34	39	7	8	82%	
South Korea	Kim Chang-min	9	4	5	65	63	39	39	8	8	82%	
Japan	Yusuke Morozumi	9	4	5	48	56	33	35	13	5	81%	
Italy	Joël Retornaz	9	3	6	50	56	37	38	15	7	81%	
Denmark	Rasmus Stjerne	9	2	7	53	70	36	39	12	5	83%	

Round-robin

Canada has a bye in draws 4, 8 and 11.

Draw 1

Wednesday, 14 February, 09:05

Sheet B	1	2	3	4	5	6	7	8	9	10	Final
Canada (Koe)	0	0	0	0	1	1	0	2	0	1	5
Italy (Retornaz) 🔨	0	0	0	1	0	0	1	0	1	0	3

Draw 2

Wednesday, 14 February, 20:05

Sheet A	1	2	3	4	5	6	7	8	9	10	Final
Canada (Koe) 🔨	2	0	2	0	0	0	1	0	0	1	6
Great Britain (Smith)	0	1	0	0	1	1	0	1	0	0	4

Draw 3

Thursday, 15 February, 14:05

Sheet B	1	2	3	4	5	6	7	8	9	10	Final
Norway (Ulsrud)	0	1	1	0	0	2	0	0	0	X	4
Canada (Koe) 🔨	2	0	0	0	1	0	1	1	2	X	7

Draw 5

Friday, 16 February, 20:05

Sheet D	1	2	3	4	5	6	7	8	9	10	Final
Canada (Koe)	0	0	3	0	1	0	2	1	0	0	7
South Korea (Kim) 🔨	0	1	0	1	0	1	0	0	2	1	6

Draw 6

Saturday, 17 February, 14:05

Sheet C	1	2	3	4	5	6	7	8	9	10	Final
Canada (Koe) 🔨	0	2	0	0	0	0	0	0	0	X	2
Sweden (Edin)	0	0	0	0	2	2	0	1	0	X	5

Draw 7

Sunday, 18 February, 09:05

Sheet D	1	2	3	4	5	6	7	8	9	10	Final
Switzerland (de Cruz) 🔨	4	0	1	0	2	0	0	0	1	X	8
Canada (Koe)	0	2	0	1	0	2	1	0	0	X	6

Draw 9

Monday, 19 February, 14:05

Sheet C	1	2	3	4	5	6	7	8	9	10	11	Final
United States (Shuster) 🔨	1	0	2	0	1	1	0	0	2	0	2	9
Canada (Koe)	0	2	0	1	0	0	1	1	0	2	0	7

Draw 10

Tuesday, 20 February, 09:05

Sheet B	1	2	3	4	5	6	7	8	9	10	Final
Japan (Morozumi)	0	2	0	0	1	0	1	0	0	X	4
Canada (Koe) 🔨	1	0	2	1	0	2	0	1	1	X	8

Draw 12

Wednesday, 21 February, 14:05

Sheet A	1	2	3	4	5	6	7	8	9	10	Final
Denmark (Stjerne)	0	1	0	1	0	0	1	X	X	X	3
Canada (Koe) 🔨	4	0	1	0	3	0	0	X	X	X	8

Semifinal

Thursday, 22 February, 20:05

Sheet C	1	2	3	4	5	6	7	8	9	10	Final
Canada (Koe) 🔨	0	1	0	1	0	0	0	0	1	0	3
United States (Shuster)	0	0	1	0	1	0	0	2	0	1	5

Bronze-medal game

Friday, 23 February, 15:35

Sheet B	1	2	3	4	5	6	7	8	9	10	Final
Canada (Koe) 🔨	0	0	0	2	0	1	0	2	0	X	5
Switzerland (de Cruz)	0	1	1	0	2	0	2	0	1	X	7

=== Women's tournament ===
Canada qualified a women's team by earning enough points in the last two World Curling Championships. The Olympic team was decided at the 2017 Canadian Olympic Curling Trials.

The Canadian team consists of Rachel Homan, Emma Miskew, Joanne Courtney, Lisa Weagle, and Cheryl Bernard.

Final round robin standings
Team	Skip	Pld	W	L	PF	PA	EW	EL	BE	SE	S%	Qualification
South Korea	Kim Eun-jung	9	8	1	75	44	41	34	5	15	79%	Playoffs
Sweden	Anna Hasselborg	9	7	2	64	48	42	34	14	13	83%	Playoffs
Great Britain	Eve Muirhead	9	6	3	61	56	39	38	12	6	79%	Playoffs
Japan	Satsuki Fujisawa	9	5	4	59	55	38	36	10	13	75%	Playoffs
China	Wang Bingyu	9	4	5	57	65	35	38	12	5	78%	
Canada	Rachel Homan	9	4	5	68	59	40	36	10	12	81%	
Switzerland	Silvana Tirinzoni	9	4	5	60	55	34	37	12	7	78%	
United States	Nina Roth	9	4	5	56	65	38	39	7	6	78%	
Olympic Athletes from Russia	Victoria Moiseeva	9	2	7	45	76	34	40	8	6	76%	
Denmark	Madeleine Dupont	9	1	8	50	72	32	41	10	6	73%	

Round-robin

Canada has a bye in draws 1, 5 and 9.

Draw 2

Thursday, 15 February, 09:05

Sheet A	1	2	3	4	5	6	7	8	9	10	Final
Canada (Homan)	0	1	0	0	0	2	1	0	0	2	6
South Korea (Kim) 🔨	1	0	0	1	2	0	0	1	3	0	8

Draw 3

Thursday, 15 February, 20:05

Sheet B	1	2	3	4	5	6	7	8	9	10	11	Final
Canada (Homan) 🔨	0	0	2	0	1	0	1	1	0	1	0	6
Sweden (Hasselborg)	2	0	0	1	0	2	0	0	1	0	1	7

Draw 4

Friday, 16 February, 14:05

Sheet A	1	2	3	4	5	6	7	8	9	10	11	Final
Denmark (Dupont)	0	0	3	1	0	2	0	0	0	2	1	9
Canada (Homan) 🔨	0	2	0	0	4	0	1	1	0	0	0	8

Draw 6

Saturday, 17 February, 20:05

Sheet D	1	2	3	4	5	6	7	8	9	10	Final
United States (Roth) 🔨	0	1	0	1	0	1	0	X	X	X	3
Canada (Homan)	3	0	1	0	3	0	4	X	X	X	11

Draw 7

Sunday, 18 February, 14:05

Sheet C	1	2	3	4	5	6	7	8	9	10	Final
Canada (Homan)	0	0	2	0	2	0	2	0	3	1	10
Switzerland (Tirinzoni) 🔨	1	0	0	3	0	3	0	1	0	0	8

Draw 8

Monday, 19 February, 09:05

Sheet B	1	2	3	4	5	6	7	8	9	10	Final
Japan (Fujisawa) 🔨	0	1	0	0	0	2	0	X	X	X	3
Canada (Homan)	1	0	0	1	4	0	2	X	X	X	8

Draw 10

Tuesday, 20 February, 14:05

Sheet A	1	2	3	4	5	6	7	8	9	10	Final
Canada (Homan) 🔨	0	0	1	2	0	1	0	0	1	0	5
China (Wang)	0	2	0	0	3	0	0	1	0	1	7

Draw 11

Wednesday, 21 February, 09:05

Sheet D	1	2	3	4	5	6	7	8	9	10	Final
Canada (Homan)	0	2	1	0	0	1	0	0	1	0	5
Great Britain (Muirhead) 🔨	1	0	0	1	0	0	0	2	0	2	6

Draw 12

Wednesday, 21 February, 20:05

Sheet C	1	2	3	4	5	6	7	8	9	10	Final
Olympic Athletes from Russia (Moiseeva) 🔨	4	0	1	0	0	0	2	1	0	0	8
Canada (Homan)	0	2	0	2	1	1	0	0	2	1	9

=== Mixed doubles ===
Canada qualified a mixed doubles team by earning enough points in the last two World Mixed Doubles Curling Championships. The Olympic team was decided at the 2018 Canadian Mixed Doubles Curling Olympic Trials. Former Olympic gold medallists John Morris and Kaitlyn Lawes won the trials, and were the mixed doubles representative for Canada.

Final round robin standings
Team	Athletes	Pld	W	L	PF	PA	EW	EL	BE	SE	S%	Qualification
Canada	Kaitlyn Lawes / John Morris	7	6	1	52	26	28	20	0	9	80%	Playoffs
Switzerland	Jenny Perret / Martin Rios	7	5	2	45	40	29	26	0	10	71%	Playoffs
Olympic Athletes from Russia	Anastasia Bryzgalova / Alexander Krushelnitskiy	7	4	3	36	44	26	27	1	7	67%	Playoffs
Norway	Kristin Skaslien / Magnus Nedregotten	7	4	3	39	43	26	25	1	8	74%	Tiebreaker
China	Wang Rui / Ba Dexin	7	4	3	47	42	27	27	1	6	72%	Tiebreaker
South Korea	Jang Hye-ji / Lee Ki-jeong	7	2	5	40	40	23	29	1	7	67%	
United States	Rebecca Hamilton / Matt Hamilton	7	2	5	37	43	26	25	0	9	74%	
Finland	Oona Kauste / Tomi Rantamäki	7	1	6	35	53	23	29	0	6	67%	

Draw 1

Thursday, February 8, 9:05

Sheet B	1	2	3	4	5	6	7	8	Final
Canada (Lawes / Morris) 🔨	1	0	3	0	2	0	0	0	6
Norway (Skaslien / Nedregotten)	0	3	0	1	0	2	1	2	9

Draw 2

Thursday, February 8, 20:04

Sheet D	1	2	3	4	5	6	7	8	Final
United States (R. Hamilton / M. Hamilton) 🔨	1	0	1	0	0	1	1	0	4
Canada (Lawes / Morris)	0	1	0	1	3	0	0	1	6

Draw 3

Friday, February 9, 8:35

Sheet C	1	2	3	4	5	6	7	8	Final
China (Wang / Ba)	0	2	0	1	0	1	0	X	4
Canada (Lawes / Morris) 🔨	3	0	4	0	1	0	2	X	10

Draw 4

Friday, February 9, 13:35

Sheet A	1	2	3	4	5	6	7	8	Final
Canada (Lawes / Morris)	1	0	1	1	0	5	X	X	8
Finland (Kauste / Rantamäki) 🔨	0	1	0	0	1	0	X	X	2

Draw 5

Saturday, February 10, 9:05

Sheet C	1	2	3	4	5	6	7	8	Final
Canada (Lawes / Morris) 🔨	0	4	0	1	1	1	X	X	7
Switzerland (Perret / Rios)	1	0	1	0	0	0	X	X	2

Draw 6

Saturday, February 10, 20:04

Sheet A	1	2	3	4	5	6	7	8	Final
Olympic Athletes from Russia (Bryzgalova / Krushelnitskiy)	0	0	1	0	1	0	X	X	2
Canada (Lawes / Morris) 🔨	3	1	0	2	0	2	X	X	8

Draw 7

Sunday, February 11, 9:05

Sheet D	1	2	3	4	5	6	7	8	Final
Canada (Lawes / Morris)	1	1	0	2	1	0	2	X	7
South Korea (Jang / Lee) 🔨	0	0	2	0	0	1	0	X	3

Semifinal

Monday, February 12, 9:05

Sheet A	1	2	3	4	5	6	7	8	Final
Canada (Lawes / Morris) 🔨	2	0	0	1	2	0	3	X	8
Norway (Skaslien / Nedregotten)	0	1	1	0	0	2	0	X	4

Final

Tuesday, February 13, 20:05

Sheet B	1	2	3	4	5	6	7	8	Final
Canada (Lawes / Morris) 🔨	2	0	4	0	2	2	X	X	10
Switzerland (Perret / Rios)	0	2	0	1	0	0	X	X	3

== Figure skating ==
Based on placements at the 2017 World Figure Skating Championships in Helsinki, Finland, Canada qualified 17 athletes (8 male and 9 female) across all four individual and pairs events. This meant Canada qualified the most figure skaters out of all nations. The team was announced after the conclusion of the 2018 Canadian Figure Skating Championships. Canada also qualified in the team event after finishing in first place in the overall qualification rankings.

Individual

Athlete	Event	SP		FS		Total	
Athlete	Event	Points	Rank	Points	Rank	Points	Rank
Patrick Chan	Men's singles	90.01	6 Q	173.42	8	263.43	9
Keegan Messing	Men's singles	85.11	10 Q	170.32	12	255.43	12
Larkyn Austman	Ladies' singles	51.42	25	Did not advance			
Gabrielle Daleman	Ladies' singles	68.90	7 Q	103.56	19	172.46	15
Kaetlyn Osmond	Ladies' singles	78.87	3 Q	152.15	3	231.02	3rd place, bronze medalist(s)

Mixed

Athlete	Event	SP / SD		FS / FD		Total	
Athlete	Event	Points	Rank	Points	Rank	Points	Rank
Meagan Duhamel / Eric Radford	Pairs	76.82	3 Q	158.31	2	230.15	3rd place, bronze medalist(s)
Kirsten Moore-Towers / Michael Marinaro	Pairs	65.68	13 Q	132.43	9	198.11	11
Julianne Séguin / Charlie Bilodeau	Pairs	67.52	12 Q	136.50	8	204.02	9
Piper Gilles / Paul Poirier	Ice dancing	69.60	9 Q	107.31	8	176.91	8
Tessa Virtue / Scott Moir	Ice dancing	83.67	1 Q	122.40	2	206.07	1st place, gold medalist(s)
Kaitlyn Weaver / Andrew Poje	Ice dancing	74.33	8 Q	107.65	7	181.98	7

Team trophy

Athlete	Event	Short program/Short dance						Free skate/Free dance					
Athlete	Event	Men's	Ladies'	Pairs	Ice dance	Total		Men's	Ladies'	Pairs	Ice dance	Total	
Athlete	Event	Points Team points	Points Team points	Points Team points	Points Team points	Points	Rank	Points Team points	Points Team points	Points Team points	Points Team points	Points	Rank
Patrick Chan (M); Kaetlyn Osmond (L) (SP); Gabrielle Daleman (L) (FS); Meagan Duhamel / Eric Radford (P); Tessa Virtue / Scott Moir (ID)	Team event	81.66; 8	71.38; 8	76.57; 9	80.51; 10	35	1	179.75; 10	137.14; 8	148.51; 10	118.10; 10	73	1st place, gold medalist(s)

== Freestyle skiing ==
Aerials

Athlete	Event	Qualification				Final					
Athlete	Event	Jump 1		Jump 2		Jump 1		Jump 2		Jump 3	
Athlete	Event	Points	Rank	Points	Rank	Points	Rank	Points	Rank	Points	Rank
Lewis Irving	Men's aerials	87.17	21	78.73	18	Did not advance					
Olivier Rochon	Men's aerials	124.34	6 QF	Bye		125.67	4 Q	128.05	2 Q	98.11	5
Catrine Lavallée	Women's aerials	73.08	16	71.34	13	Did not advance					

Halfpipe

Athlete	Event	Qualification				Final				
Athlete	Event	Run 1	Run 2	Best	Rank	Run 1	Run 2	Run 3	Best	Rank
Simon d'Artois	Men's halfpipe	66.60	40.40	66.60	13	Did not advance				
Noah Bowman	Men's halfpipe	43.00	77.20	77.20	9 Q	89.40	19.20	11.20	89.40	5
Mike Riddle	Men's halfpipe	6.40	82.20	82.20	7 Q	85.40	26.00	27.40	85.40	6
Rosalind Groenewoud	Women's halfpipe	73.20	72.80	73.20	11 Q	70.60	67.80	66.60	70.60	10
Cassie Sharpe	Women's halfpipe	93.00	93.40	93.40	1 Q	94.40	95.80	42.00	95.80	1st place, gold medalist(s)

Moguls

Athlete	Event	Qualification								Final											
Athlete	Event	Run 1				Run 2				Run 1				Run 2				Run 3			
Athlete	Event	Time	Points	Total	Rank	Time	Points	Total	Rank	Time	Points	Total	Rank	Time	Points	Total	Rank	Time	Points	Total	Rank
Marc-Antoine Gagnon	Men's moguls	26.04	13.66	76.32	11	25.40	14.51	75.88	5 Q	25.37	14.54	78.38	9 Q	25.53	14.33	77.40	6 Q	25.30	14.64	77.02	4
Mikaël Kingsbury	Men's moguls	23.87	16.52	86.07	1 Q	Bye				24.88	15.19	81.27	4 Q	25.10	14.90	82.19	2 Q	24.83	15.26	86.63	1st place, gold medalist(s)
Philippe Marquis	Men's moguls	26.12	13.56	77.77	8 Q	Bye				DNF				Did not advance							
Chloé Dufour-Lapointe	Women's moguls	30.01	14.18	69.53	13	29.45	14.81	68.48	8 Q	30.39	13.75	70.98	17	Did not advance							
Justine Dufour-Lapointe	Women's moguls	29.26	15.03	77.66	4 Q	Bye				29.70	14.53	79.50	1 Q	29.70	14.53	77.48	4 Q	29.54	14.71	78.56	2nd place, silver medalist(s)
Andi Naude	Women's moguls	29.10	15.21	79.60	2 Q	Bye				29.06	15.25	73.99	10 Q	28.98	15.34	78.78	1 Q	DNF			
Audrey Robichaud	Women's moguls	32.32	11.58	72.48	10 Q	Bye				32.00	11.94	74.27	8 Q	32.47	15.28	74.89	9	Did not advance			

Ski cross

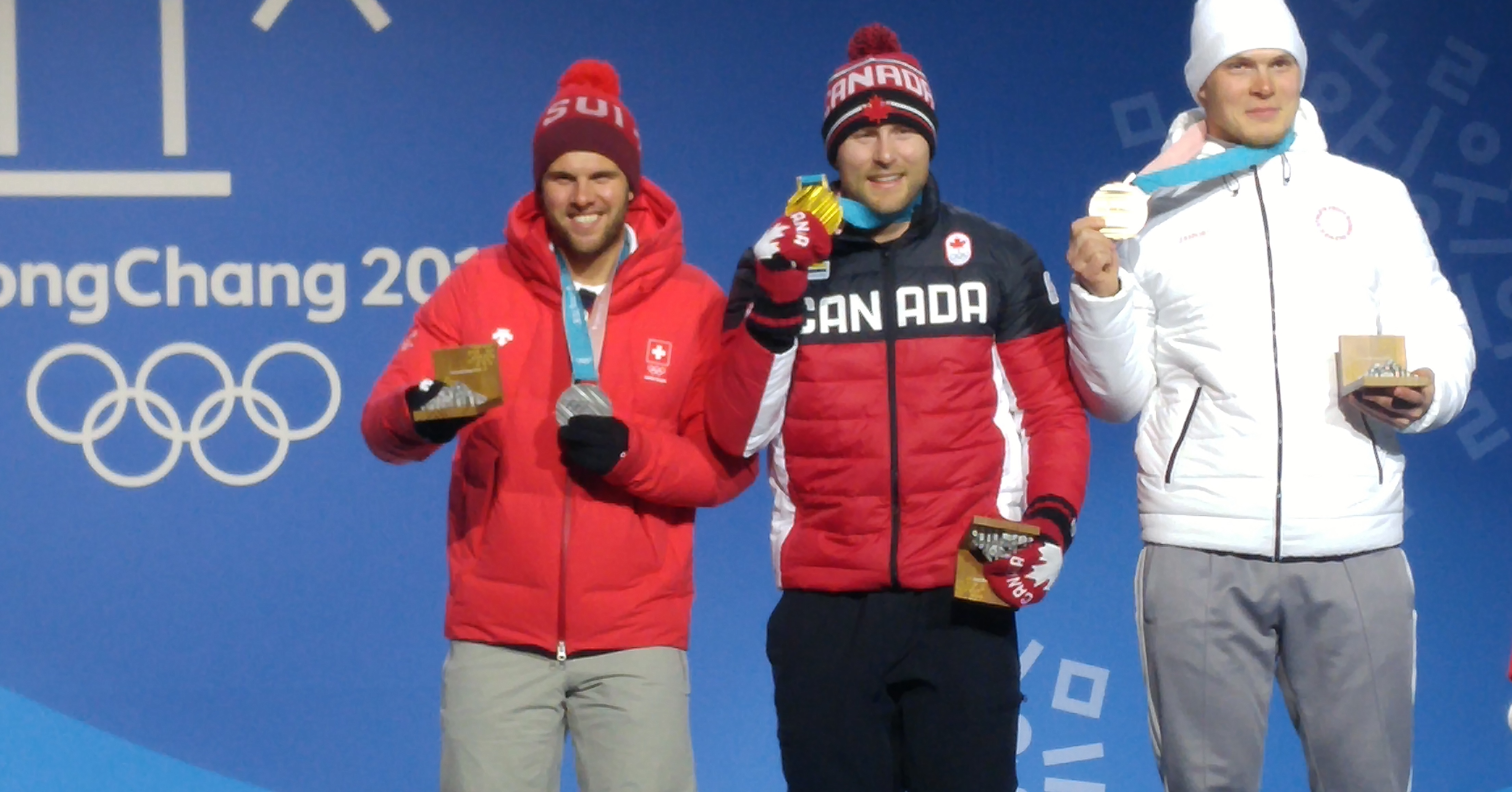
Brady Leman (centre) won gold

Athlete	Event	Seeding		Round of 16	Quarterfinal	Semifinal	Final	
Athlete	Event	Time	Rank	Position	Position	Position	Position	Rank
Christopher Del Bosco	Men's ski cross	1:48.25	31	DNF	Did not advance			
Kevin Drury	Men's ski cross	1:09.41	3	1 Q	1 Q	1 FA	DNF	4
Dave Duncan	Men's ski cross	1:10.51	26	1 Q	2 Q	4 FB	4	8
Brady Leman	Men's ski cross	1:09.94	8	2 Q	1 Q	1 FA	1	1st place, gold medalist(s)
Kelsey Serwa	Women's ski cross	1:13.33	2	1 Q	1 Q	2 FA	1	1st place, gold medalist(s)
India Sherret	Women's ski cross	1:15.48	11	DNF	Did not advance			
Brittany Phelan	Women's ski cross	1:13.56	3	1 Q	1 Q	1 FA	2	2nd place, silver medalist(s)
Marielle Thompson	Women's ski cross	1:13.11	1	3	Did not advance			

Qualification legend: FA – Qualify to medal round; FB – Qualify to consolation round

Slopestyle

Athlete	Event	Qualification				Final				
Athlete	Event	Run 1	Run 2	Best	Rank	Run 1	Run 2	Run 3	Best	Rank
Alex Beaulieu-Marchand	Men's slopestyle	48.20	94.20	94.20	3 Q	81.60	92.40	82.40	92.40	3rd place, bronze medalist(s)
Alex Bellemare	Men's slopestyle	64.20	26.20	64.20	22	Did not advance				
Teal Harle	Men's slopestyle	88.00	91.20	91.20	6 Q	22.80	25.60	90.00	90.00	5
Evan McEachran	Men's slopestyle	74.80	87.80	87.80	11 Q	89.40	4.40	32.60	89.40	6
Dara Howell	Women's slopestyle	12.80	32.00	32.00	21	Did not advance				
Kim Lamarre	Women's slopestyle	22.80	23.60	23.60	22	Did not advance				
Yuki Tsubota	Women's slopestyle	65.40	78.20	78.20	9 Q	74.40	26.40	40.40	74.40	6

== Ice hockey ==
Canada qualified a men's and women's team for a total of 48 athletes (25 men and 23 women).

Summary

Key:

- OT – Overtime
- GWS – Match decided by penalty-shootout

Team	Event	Group stage				Qualification playoff	Quarterfinal	Semifinal / Pl.	Final / BM / Pl.	
Team	Event	Opposition Score	Opposition Score	Opposition Score	Rank	Opposition Score	Opposition Score	Opposition Score	Opposition Score	Rank
Canada men's	Men's tournament	Switzerland; W 5–1	Czech Republic; L 2–3 GWS	South Korea; W 4-0	2 QQ	Bye	Finland; W 1-0	Germany; L 3–4	Czech Republic; W 6-4	3rd place, bronze medalist(s)
Canada women's	Women's tournament	Olympic Athletes from Russia; W 5–0	Finland; W 4–1	United States; W 2–1	1 QS	—N/a	Bye	Olympic Athletes from Russia; W 5-0	United States; L 2-3 GWS	2nd place, silver medalist(s)

=== Men's tournament ===
Canada men's national ice hockey team qualified by finishing 1st in the 2015 IIHF World Ranking. The official roster of the games was announced on January 11, 2018. The team did not include any of Canada's National Hockey League players as the league decided to not participate at the games. This meant about 300 of the country's top players did not make the team.

Roster

The following is the Canadian roster for the men's ice hockey tournament at the 2018 Winter Olympics.

Head coach: (Canada) Willie Desjardins Assistant coaches: (Canada) Dave King, (Canada) Scott Walker, (Canada) Craig Woodcroft

No.	Pos.	Name	Height	Weight	Birthdate	Birthplace	2017–18 team
3	D	Karl Stollery	5 ft 11 in (1.80 m)	181 lb (82 kg)	November 21, 1987	Camrose, Alberta	(Latvia) Dinamo Riga (KHL)
4	D	Chris Lee – A	6 ft 0 in (1.83 m)	185 lb (84 kg)	October 3, 1980	MacTier, Ontario	(Russia) Metallurg Magnitogorsk (KHL)
5	D	Chay Genoway	5 ft 9 in (1.75 m)	176 lb (80 kg)	December 20, 1986	Morden, Manitoba	(Russia) HC Lada Togliatti (KHL)
7	F	Gilbert Brulé	5 ft 10 in (1.78 m)	190 lb (86 kg)	January 1, 1987	Edmonton, Alberta	(China) Kunlun Red Star (KHL)
8	F	Wojtek Wolski	6 ft 3 in (1.91 m)	220 lb (100 kg)	February 24, 1986	Zabrze, Poland	(Russia) Metallurg Magnitogorsk (KHL)
9	F	Derek Roy – A	5 ft 9 in (1.75 m)	187 lb (85 kg)	May 4, 1983	Rockland, Ontario	(Sweden) Linköpings HC (SHL)
11	F	Chris Kelly – C	6 ft 0 in (1.83 m)	194 lb (88 kg)	November 11, 1980	Toronto, Ontario	(Canada) Belleville Senators (AHL)
12	F	Rob Klinkhammer	6 ft 2 in (1.88 m)	216 lb (98 kg)	August 12, 1986	Lethbridge, Alberta	(Russia) Ak Bars Kazan (KHL)
15	F	Brandon Kozun	5 ft 8 in (1.73 m)	172 lb (78 kg)	March 8, 1990	Los Angeles, California, United States	(Russia) Lokomotiv Yaroslavl (KHL)
16	F	Quinton Howden	6 ft 2 in (1.88 m)	190 lb (86 kg)	January 21, 1992	Oakbank, Manitoba	(Belarus) HC Dinamo Minsk (KHL)
17	F	Rene Bourque – A	6 ft 2 in (1.88 m)	216 lb (98 kg)	December 10, 1981	Lac La Biche, Alberta	(Sweden) Djurgårdens IF (SHL)
18	D	Marc-André Gragnani	6 ft 3 in (1.91 m)	205 lb (93 kg)	March 11, 1987	L'Île-Bizard, Quebec	(Belarus) HC Dinamo Minsk (KHL)
19	F	Andrew Ebbett – A	5 ft 9 in (1.75 m)	176 lb (80 kg)	January 2, 1983	Vernon, British Columbia	(Switzerland) SC Bern (NL)
21	F	Mason Raymond	6 ft 1 in (1.85 m)	179 lb (81 kg)	September 17, 1985	Cochrane, Alberta	(Switzerland) SC Bern (NL)
22	F	Eric O'Dell	6 ft 1 in (1.85 m)	201 lb (91 kg)	June 21, 1990	Ottawa, Ontario	(Russia) HC Sochi (KHL)
24	D	Stefan Elliott	6 ft 1 in (1.85 m)	190 lb (86 kg)	January 30, 1991	Vancouver, British Columbia	(Sweden) HV71 (SHL)
27	D	Cody Goloubef	6 ft 1 in (1.85 m)	201 lb (91 kg)	November 30, 1989	Oakville, Ontario	(United States) Stockton Heat (AHL)
30	G	Ben Scrivens	6 ft 2 in (1.88 m)	198 lb (90 kg)	September 11, 1986	Spruce Grove, Alberta	(Russia) Salavat Yulaev Ufa (KHL)
31	G	Kevin Poulin	6 ft 2 in (1.88 m)	205 lb (93 kg)	April 12, 1990	Montreal, Quebec	(Switzerland) EHC Kloten (NL)
35	G	Justin Peters	6 ft 1 in (1.85 m)	209 lb (95 kg)	August 30, 1986	Blyth, Ontario	(Germany) Kölner Haie (DEL)
37	D	Mat Robinson	5 ft 9 in (1.75 m)	185 lb (84 kg)	June 20, 1986	Calgary, Alberta	(Russia) CSKA Moscow (KHL)
40	F	Maxim Lapierre	6 ft 0 in (1.83 m)	216 lb (98 kg)	March 29, 1985	Saint-Leonard, Quebec	(Switzerland) HC Lugano (NL)
56	D	Maxim Noreau – A	6 ft 0 in (1.83 m)	198 lb (90 kg)	May 24, 1987	Montreal, Quebec	(Switzerland) SC Bern (NL)
91	F	Linden Vey	6 ft 0 in (1.83 m)	190 lb (86 kg)	July 17, 1991	Wakaw, Saskatchewan	(Switzerland) ZSC Lions (NL)
92	F	Christian Thomas	5 ft 9 in (1.75 m)	174 lb (79 kg)	May 26, 1992	Toronto, Ontario	(United States) Wilkes-Barre/Scranton Penguins (AHL)

Preliminary round

Pos	Team	Pld	W	OTW	OTL	L	GF	GA	GD	Pts	Qualification
1	Czech Republic	3	2	1	0	0	9	4	+5	8	Quarterfinals
2	Canada	3	2	0	1	0	11	4	+7	7	Quarterfinals
3	Switzerland	3	1	0	0	2	10	9	+1	3	Qualification playoffs
4	South Korea (H)	3	0	0	0	3	1	14	−13	0	Qualification playoffs

Source: IIHF
(H) Host

15 February 2018; 21:10	Switzerland	1–5 (0–2, 0–2, 1–1)	Canada	Kwandong Hockey Centre, Gangneung; Attendance: 2,802

Game reference

Leonardo Genoni
Jonas Hiller
Goalies
Ben Scrivens
Referees:
(Czech Republic) Antonín Jeřábek
(Russia) Konstantin Olenin
Linesmen:
(Sweden) Jimmy Dahmen
(Russia) Alexander Otmakhov

	0–1	02:57 – Bourque (Lee, Roy)
	0–2	07:30 – Noreau (Lee, Roy) (PP)
	0–3	25:00 – Bourque (Roy) (PP)
	0–4	25:52 – Wolski (Noreau)
Moser (Rüfenacht, Ambühl) (PP, EA) – 47:33	1–4
	1–5	54:53 – Wolski (Kelly, Ebbett) (ENG)

6 min
Penalties
6 min
29
Shots
28

17 February 2018; 12:10	Canada	2–3 GWS (2–1, 0–1, 0–0) (OT: 0–0) (SO: 0–1)	Czech Republic	Gangneung Hockey Centre, Gangneung; Attendance: 6,731

Game reference

Ben Scrivens
Goalies
Pavel Francouz
Referees:
(Russia) Roman Gofman
(Finland) Anssi Salonen
Linesmen:
(Russia) Gleb Lazarov
(United States) Judson Ritter

Raymond (Vey, Gragnani) (PP) – 01:13	1–0
	1–1	06:52 – Kubalík
Bourque (Noreau, Brulé) (PP) – 13:30	2–1
	2–2	20:25 – Jordán (Birner, Horák)

Lapierre (miss)
Wolski
Roy (miss)
Bourque (miss)
Noreau (miss)
Shootout
(miss) Růžička
Koukal
Kovář
(miss) Červenka
6 min
Penalties
10 min
33
Shots
21

18 February 2018; 21:10	Canada	4–0 (1–0, 1–0, 2–0)	South Korea	Gangneung Hockey Centre, Gangneung; Attendance: 6,038

Game reference

Kevin Poulin
Goalies
Matt Dalton
Referees:
(Slovakia) Jozef Kubuš
(Switzerland) Daniel Stricker
Linesmen:
(Switzerland) Nicolas Fluri
(Czech Republic) Vít Lederer

Thomas (Genoway, Wolski) – 07:36	1–0
O'Dell (Gragnani, Noreau) – 34:22	2–0
Lapierre (Roy) – 45:43	3–0
Brulé (Lee, Roy) (PP) – 58:02	4–0

8 min
Penalties
8 min
49
Shots
19

Quarterfinal

21 February 2018; 21:10	Canada	1–0 (0–0, 0–0, 1–0)	Finland	Gangneung Hockey Centre, Pyeongchang; Attendance: 2,265

Game reference
Ben Scrivens; Kevin Poulin	Goalies	Mikko Koskinen	Referees: (Czech Republic) Antonín Jeřábek (Russia) Konstantin Olenin; Linesmen: (Russia) Gleb Lazarev (Sweden) Henrik Pihlblad
Noreau (O'Dell) – 40:55 / 1–0			Referees: (Czech Republic) Antonín Jeřábek (Russia) Konstantin Olenin; Linesmen: (Russia) Gleb Lazarev (Sweden) Henrik Pihlblad
6 min	Penalties	4 min	Referees: (Czech Republic) Antonín Jeřábek (Russia) Konstantin Olenin; Linesmen: (Russia) Gleb Lazarev (Sweden) Henrik Pihlblad
30	Shots	21	Referees: (Czech Republic) Antonín Jeřábek (Russia) Konstantin Olenin; Linesmen: (Russia) Gleb Lazarev (Sweden) Henrik Pihlblad

Semifinal

23 February 2018; 21:10	Canada	3–4 (0–1, 1–3, 2–0)	Germany	Gangneung Hockey Centre, Pyeongchang; Attendance: 4,057

Game reference

Kevin Poulin
Goalies
Danny aus den Birken
Referees:
(Slovakia) Jozef Kubuš
(United States) Timothy Mayer
Linesmen:
(United States) Fraser McIntyre
(Russia) Alexander Otmakhov

	0–1	14:43 – Macek (Kahun) (PP2)
	0–2	23:21 – Plachta (Hager)
	0–3	26:49 – Mauer (Goc, Wolf)
Brulé (Lee, Noreau) (PP) – 28:17	1–3
	1–4	32:31 – Hager (Plachta, Schütz) (PP)
Robinson (Thomas, Raymond) – 42:42	2–4
Roy (Lee, Noreau) (PP) – 49:42	3–4

35 min
Penalties
16 min
31
Shots
15

Bronze medal game

24 February 2018; 21:10	Czech Republic	4–6 (1–3, 0–0, 3–3)	Canada (bronze)	Gangneung Hockey Centre, Pyeongchang; Attendance: 4,807

Game reference

Pavel Francouz
Goalies
Kevin Poulin
Referees:
(United States) Timothy Mayer
(Russia) Konstantin Olenin
Linesmen:
(United States) Fraser McIntyre
(Russia) Alexander Otmakhov

	0–1	08:57 – Ebbett (Robinson, Gragnani) (PP)
Růžička (Červenka) – 09:13	1–1
	1–2	09:28 – Kelly (Goloubef, Klinkhammer)
	1–3	15:57 – Roy (Kozun, Bourque)
	1–4	45:50 – Ebbett (Kozun, Goloubef)
Kovář (Horák, Řepík) (EA) – 46:36	2–4
	2–5	49:37 – Kelly (Klinkhammer)
	2–6	55:23 – Wolski (Howden)
Červenka (Nakládal, Mertl) – 56:26	3–6
Červenka (Polášek, Mozík) (PP, EA) – 57:55	4–6

4 min
Penalties
6 min
34
Shots
26

=== Women's tournament ===
Canada women's national ice hockey team qualified by finishing 2nd in the 2016 IIHF World Ranking.

Roster

The following is the Canadian roster for the women's ice hockey tournament at the 2018 Winter Olympics.

Head coach: (Canada) Laura Schuler Assistant coaches: (Canada) Dwayne Gylywoychuk, (Canada) Troy Ryan

No.	Pos.	Name	Height	Weight	Birthdate	Birthplace	2017–18 team
1	G	Shannon Szabados	5 ft 8 in (1.73 m)	141 lb (64 kg)	August 6, 1986	Edmonton, Alberta	(Canada) National Women's Team
2	F	Meghan Agosta – A	5 ft 7 in (1.70 m)	148 lb (67 kg)	February 12, 1987	Windsor, Ontario	(Canada) National Women's Team
3	D	Jocelyne Larocque – A	5 ft 6 in (1.68 m)	146 lb (66 kg)	May 19, 1988	Ste. Anne, Manitoba	(Canada) Markham Thunder (CWHL)
4	D	Brigette Lacquette	5 ft 6 in (1.68 m)	181 lb (82 kg)	November 10, 1992	Dauphin, Manitoba	(Canada) Calgary Inferno (CWHL)
5	D	Lauriane Rougeau	5 ft 8 in (1.73 m)	168 lb (76 kg)	April 12, 1990	Pointe-Claire, Quebec	(Canada) Les Canadiennes (CWHL)
6	F	Rebecca Johnston	5 ft 9 in (1.75 m)	148 lb (67 kg)	September 24, 1989	Sudbury, Ontario	(Canada) Calgary Inferno (CWHL)
7	F	Laura Stacey	5 ft 10 in (1.78 m)	157 lb (71 kg)	May 5, 1994	Mississauga, Ontario	(Canada) Markham Thunder (CWHL)
8	D	Laura Fortino	5 ft 4 in (1.63 m)	137 lb (62 kg)	January 30, 1991	Hamilton, Ontario	(Canada) Markham Thunder (CWHL)
9	F	Jenn Wakefield	5 ft 10 in (1.78 m)	176 lb (80 kg)	June 15, 1989	Scarborough, Ontario	(Canada) National Women's Team
11	F	Jillian Saulnier	5 ft 5 in (1.65 m)	146 lb (66 kg)	March 7, 1992	Halifax, Nova Scotia	(Canada) Calgary Inferno (CWHL)
12	D	Meaghan Mikkelson	5 ft 9 in (1.75 m)	150 lb (68 kg)	January 4, 1985	Regina, Saskatchewan	(Canada) Calgary Inferno (CWHL)
14	D	Renata Fast	5 ft 6 in (1.68 m)	143 lb (65 kg)	October 6, 1994	Hamilton, Ontario	(Canada) Toronto Furies (CWHL)
15	F	Mélodie Daoust	5 ft 4 in (1.63 m)	157 lb (71 kg)	January 7, 1992	Valleyfield, Quebec	(Canada) Les Canadiennes (CWHL)
17	F	Bailey Bram	5 ft 8 in (1.73 m)	139 lb (63 kg)	September 5, 1990	Winnipeg, Manitoba	(Canada) Calgary Inferno (CWHL)
19	F	Brianne Jenner – A	5 ft 9 in (1.75 m)	157 lb (71 kg)	May 4, 1991	Oakville, Ontario	(Canada) Calgary Inferno (CWHL)
20	F	Sarah Nurse	5 ft 9 in (1.75 m)	148 lb (67 kg)	January 4, 1995	Hamilton, Ontario	(United States) University of Wisconsin (WCHA)
21	F	Haley Irwin	5 ft 7 in (1.70 m)	170 lb (77 kg)	June 6, 1988	Thunder Bay, Ontario	(Canada) Calgary Inferno (CWHL)
24	F	Natalie Spooner	5 ft 10 in (1.78 m)	181 lb (82 kg)	October 17, 1990	Scarborough, Ontario	(Canada) Toronto Furies (CWHL)
26	F	Emily Clark	5 ft 7 in (1.70 m)	134 lb (61 kg)	November 28, 1995	Saskatoon, Saskatchewan	(United States) University of Wisconsin (WCHA)
29	F	Marie-Philip Poulin – C	5 ft 7 in (1.70 m)	161 lb (73 kg)	March 28, 1991	Quebec City, Quebec	(Canada) Les Canadiennes (CWHL)
31	G	Geneviève Lacasse	5 ft 8 in (1.73 m)	152 lb (69 kg)	May 5, 1989	Montreal, Quebec	(Canada) Calgary Inferno (CWHL)
35	G	Ann-Renée Desbiens	5 ft 9 in (1.75 m)	161 lb (73 kg)	April 10, 1994	La Malbaie, Quebec	(Canada) National Women's Team
40	F	Blayre Turnbull	5 ft 7 in (1.70 m)	159 lb (72 kg)	July 15, 1993	New Glasgow, Nova Scotia	(Canada) Calgary Inferno (CWHL)

Preliminary round

Pos	Team	Pld	W	OTW	OTL	L	GF	GA	GD	Pts	Qualification
1	Canada	3	3	0	0	0	11	2	+9	9	Semifinals
2	United States	3	2	0	0	1	9	3	+6	6	Semifinals
3	Finland	3	1	0	0	2	7	8	−1	3	Quarterfinals
4	Olympic Athletes from Russia	3	0	0	0	3	1	15	−14	0	Quarterfinals

Source: IIHF

11 February 2018; 21:10	Canada	5–0 (0–0, 3–0, 2–0)	Olympic Athletes from Russia	Kwandong Hockey Centre, Gangneung; Attendance: 3,912

Game reference

Ann-Renée Desbiens
Goalies
Nadezhda Morozova
Nadezhda Aleksandrova
Referees:
(Slovakia) Nikoleta Celárová
(Sweden) Katarina Timglas
Linesmen:
(Finland) Jenni Heikkinen
(Germany) Lisa Linnek

Johnston (Jenner, Saulnier) – 21:55	1–0
Irwin (Johnston) (PP) – 24:13	2–0
Daoust (Agosta, Poulin) – 35:58	3–0
Johnston (Lacquette, Poulin) (PP2) – 48:41	4–0
Daoust (Poulin) – 50:44	5–0

4 min
Penalties
14 min
48
Shots
18

13 February 2018; 16:40	Canada	4–1 (2–0, 2–0, 0–1)	Finland	Kwandong Hockey Centre, Gangneung; Attendance: 3,879

Game reference

Shannon Szabados
Goalies
Noora Räty
Referees:
(United States) Dina Allena
(United States) Melissa Szkola
Linesmen:
(Sweden) Veronica Johansson
(United States) Jessica Leclerc

Agosta (Daoust) – 00:35	1–0
Poulin – 17:11	2–0
Daoust (Fortino, Agosta) – 28:19	3–0
Saulnier (Johnston) – 38:26	4–0
	4–1	47:17 – Välilä (Tapani, Karvinen)

8 min
Penalties
10 min
32
Shots
23

15 February 2018; 12:10	United States	1–2 (0–0, 0–2, 1–0)	Canada	Kwandong Hockey Centre, Gangneung; Attendance: 3,885

Game reference

Maddie Rooney
Goalies
Geneviève Lacasse
Referees:
(Norway) Aina Hove
(Sweden) Katarina Timglas
Linesmen:
(Finland) Jenni Heikkinen
(Sweden) Veronica Johansson

	0–1	27:18 – Agosta (Spooner, Jenner) (PP)
	0–2	34:56 – Nurse (Larocque)
Coyne (Decker) – 40:23	1–2

12 min
Penalties
8 min
45
Shots
23

Semifinal

19 February 2018; 21:10	Canada	5–0 (1–0, 1–0, 3–0)	Olympic Athletes from Russia	Gangneung Hockey Centre, Gangneung; Attendance: 3,396

Game reference

Shannon Szabados
Goalies
Valeria Tarakanova
Nadezhda Alexandrova
Referees:
(United States) Katie Guay
(United States) Melissa Szkola
Linesmen:
(Germany) Lisa Linnek
(Finland) Johanna Tauriainen

Wakefield (Spooner, Turnbull) – 01:50	1–0
Poulin (Daoust) – 23:10	2–0
Wakefield (Fortino, Turnbull) – 41:59	3–0
Clark (Stacey, Mikkelson) – 42:30	4–0
Johnston (Daoust, Irwin) (PP) – 54:08	5–0

4 min
Penalties
16 min
47
Shots
14

Final

22 February 2018; 13:10	(silver) Canada	2–3 GWS (0–1, 2–0, 0–1) (OT: 0–0) (SO: 0–1)	United States (gold)	Gangneung Hockey Centre, Gangneung; Attendance: 4,467

Game reference

Shannon Szabados
Goalies
Maddie Rooney
Referees:
(Germany) Nicole Hertrich
(Sweden) Katarina Timglas
Linesmen:
(Germany) Lisa Linnek
(Finland) Johanna Tauriainen

	0–1	19:34 – Knight (Morin, Decker) (PP)
Irwin (Turnbull) – 22:00	1–1
Poulin (Agosta, Daoust) – 26:55	2–1
	2–2	53:39 – Lamoureux-Morando (Pannek)

Spooner (miss)
Agosta
Poulin (miss)
Daoust
Jenner (miss)
Agosta (miss)
Shootout
Marvin
(miss) Brandt
(miss) Pfalzer
Kessel
(miss) Knight
Lamoureux-Davidson
12 min
Penalties
6 min
31
Shots
42

== Luge ==
Based on results of the 2017–18 Luge World Cup, Canada qualified eight athletes and a relay team. The team consists of three athletes each in the individual events and a doubles sled. The team was officially named on December 20, 2017.

Men

Athlete	Event	Run 1		Run 2		Run 3		Run 4		Total	
Athlete	Event	Time	Rank	Time	Rank	Time	Rank	Time	Rank	Time	Rank
Samuel Edney	Singles	47.862	9	47.755	4	47.759	10	47.645	6	3:11.021	6
Mitchel Malyk	Singles	48.075	17	48.050	18	47.952	16	47.869	12	3:11.946	16
Reid Watts	Singles	47.960	12	47.895	10	47.787	11	47.848	11	3:11.490	12
Tristan Walker; Justin Snith	Doubles	46.134	4	46.235	6	—N/a				1:32.369	5

Women

Athlete	Event	Run 1		Run 2		Run 3		Run 4		Total	
Athlete	Event	Time	Rank	Time	Rank	Time	Rank	Time	Rank	Time	Rank
Brooke Apshkrum	Singles	46.834	16	46.839	13	46.905	14	46.983	15	3:07.561	13
Alex Gough	Singles	46.317	2	46.328	4	46.425	3	46.574	3	3:05.644	3rd place, bronze medalist(s)
Kimberley McRae	Singles	46.339	4	46.449	8	46.480	4	46.610	4	3:05.878	5

Mixed team relay

Athlete	Event	Run 1		Run 2		Run 3		Total	
Athlete	Event	Time	Rank	Time	Rank	Time	Rank	Time	Rank
Samuel Edney; Alex Gough; Justin Snith; Tristan Walker	Team relay	47.099	4	48.820	4	48.953	2	2:24.872	2nd place, silver medalist(s)

== Short track speed skating ==
Canada named its team of short track speed skaters in August 2017. Later in 2017 after the conclusion of the 2017–18 ISU Short Track Speed Skating World Cup, Canada qualified a full team of ten athletes (five per gender), allowing all athletes named to the team to compete. On January 25, 2018, Speed Skating Canada officially unveiled the team and which events each athlete would compete in.

Men

Athlete	Event	Heat		Quarterfinal		Semifinal		Final	
Athlete	Event	Time	Rank	Time	Rank	Time	Rank	Time	Rank
Charle Cournoyer	1000 m	1:24.051	3	Did not advance					
Pascal Dion	1500 m	2:16.856	5 ADV	—N/a		2:12.640	3 FB	2:26.412	10
Samuel Girard	500 m	40.493	1 Q	40.477	1 Q	40.185	2 FA	39.987	4
Samuel Girard	1000 m	1:23.894	1 Q	1:24.289	1 Q	1:25.102	4 AA	1:24.650	1st place, gold medalist(s)
Samuel Girard	1500 m	2:12.923	2 Q	—N/a		—	6 AA	2:11.176	4
Charles Hamelin	500 m	PEN		Did not advance					
Charles Hamelin	1000 m	1:23.407 OR	1 Q	1:24.015	2 Q	PEN	Did not advance		
Charles Hamelin	1500 m	2:12.130	1 Q	—N/a		2:11.124	1 FA	PEN	13
Charle Cournoyer; Pascal Dion; Samuel Girard; Charles Hamelin; François Hamelin	5000 m relay	—N/a				6:41.042	2 FA	6:32.282	3rd place, bronze medalist(s)

Women

Athlete	Event	Heat		Quarterfinal		Semifinal		Final	
Athlete	Event	Time	Rank	Time	Rank	Time	Rank	Time	Rank
Kim Boutin	500 m	43.634	1 Q	42.789	2 Q	43.234	3 AA	43.881	3rd place, bronze medalist(s)
Kim Boutin	1000 m	1:32.402	1 Q	1:30.013	1 Q	1:29.065	1 FA	1:29.956	2nd place, silver medalist(s)
Kim Boutin	1500 m	2:21.149	2 Q	—N/a		2:22.799	2 FA	2:25.834	3rd place, bronze medalist(s)
Jamie Macdonald	500 m	PEN		Did not advance					
Valérie Maltais	1000 m	1:30.773	2 Q	1:30.131	2 Q	PEN	Did not advance		
Valérie Maltais	1500 m	2:29.877	3 Q	—N/a		PEN	Did not advance		
Marianne St-Gelais	500 m	43.437	1 Q	PEN		Did not advance			
Marianne St-Gelais	1000 m	1:30.512	2 Q	1:30.180	3	Did not advance			
Marianne St-Gelais	1500 m	2:31.274	2 Q	—N/a		PEN	Did not advance		
Kim Boutin; Kasandra Bradette; Jamie Macdonald; Valérie Maltais; Marianne St-Gelais	3000 m relay	—N/a				4:07.627	2 FA	PEN	

Qualification legend: ADV – Advanced due to being impeded by another skater; AA – Advanced to final round due to being impeded by another skater; FA – Qualify to medal round; FB – Qualify to consolation round; OR – Olympic record

== Skeleton ==
Canada qualified the maximum team size of three men and three women. The team was officially announced on January 24, 2018.

Athlete	Event	Run 1		Run 2		Run 3		Run 4		Total	
Athlete	Event	Time	Rank	Time	Rank	Time	Rank	Time	Rank	Time	Rank
Kevin Boyer	Men's	51.46	18	51.24	16	51.14	14	51.56	17	3:25.40	17
Dave Greszczyszyn	Men's	51.73	23	51.31	18	51.57	21	Eliminated		2:34.61	21
Barrett Martineau	Men's	51.94	26	51.76	24	51.70	23	Eliminated		2:35.40	24
Jane Channell	Women's	52.42	11	52.28	8	52.28	10	52.09	8	3:29.07	10
Mirela Rahneva	Women's	52.48	14	52.33	11	52.06	8	52.65	15	3:29.52	12
Elisabeth Vathje	Women's	52.45	12	52.01	1	52.37	14	51.82	2	3:28.65	9

== Ski jumping ==
Canada qualified two ski jumpers, one male and one female. The team was officially announced on January 24, 2018.

Athlete	Event	Qualification			First round			Final			Total	
Athlete	Event	Distance	Points	Rank	Distance	Points	Rank	Distance	Points	Rank	Points	Rank
Mackenzie Boyd-Clowes	Men's normal hill	98.0	114.6	23 Q	103.5	111.1	18 Q	98.5	97.0	27	208.1	26
Mackenzie Boyd-Clowes	Men's large hill	124.5	102.4	25 Q	127.5	117.4	23 Q	126.0	117.9	20	235.3	21
Taylor Henrich	Women's normal hill	—N/a			78.0	86.5	32	Did not advance				

== Snowboarding ==
Canada qualified 21 athletes (ten men and eleven women), however returned its only quota for the women's parallel giant slalom, meaning only 20 athletes were officially named to the team (ten per gender). Canada's slopestyle and big air team of seven athletes was named on January 9, 2018. Canada's halfpipe, snowboard cross and alpine team of thirteen athletes was named on January 25, 2018. On January 30, 2018 Canada received an additional spot in men's snowboard cross, allowing Éliot Grondin to compete as the fourth Canadian in this event.

Freestyle
Men

Athlete	Event	Qualification				Final				
Athlete	Event	Run 1	Run 2	Best	Rank	Run 1	Run 2	Run 3	Best/Total	Rank
Mark McMorris	Slopestyle	83.70	86.83	86.83	2 Q	75.30	85.20	60.68	85.20	3rd place, bronze medalist(s)
Mark McMorris	Big air	89.00	95.75	95.75	3 Q	40.50	JNS	32.00	72.50	10
Tyler Nicholson	Slopestyle	17.41	79.21	79.21	5 Q	36.18	76.41	76.15	76.41	7
Tyler Nicholson	Big air	87.25	89.25	89.25	7	Did not advance				
Maxence Parrot	Slopestyle	83.45	87.36	87.36	1 Q	45.13	49.48	86.00	86.00	2nd place, silver medalist(s)
Maxence Parrot	Big air	89.25	92.50	92.50	1 Q	85.00	JNS	32.75	117.75	9
Sebastien Toutant	Slopestyle	78.01	45.06	78.01	3 Q	33.66	57.23	61.08	61.08	11
Sebastien Toutant	Big air	91.00	45.00	91.00	5 Q	84.75	89.50	JNS	174.25	1st place, gold medalist(s)
Derek Livingston	Halfpipe	71.25	32.75	71.25	17	Did not advance				

Qualification Legend: QF – Qualify directly to final

Women

Athlete	Event	Qualification				Final				
Athlete	Event	Run 1	Run 2	Best	Rank	Run 1	Run 2	Run 3	Best/Total	Rank
Laurie Blouin	Slopestyle	Cancelled				49.16	76.33	CAN	76.33	2nd place, silver medalist(s)
Laurie Blouin	Big air	90.25	92.25	92.25	4 Q	JNS	39.25	DNS	39.25	12
Spencer O'Brien	Slopestyle	Cancelled				26.43	36.45	CAN	36.45	22
Spencer O'Brien	Big air	69.50	76.75	76.75	11 Q	51.25	JNS	62.00	113.25	9
Brooke Voigt	Slopestyle	Cancelled				24.36	36.61	CAN	36.61	21
Brooke Voigt	Big air	67.75	32.00	67.75	17	Did not advance				
Elizabeth Hosking	Halfpipe	25.25	36.75	36.75	19	Did not advance				
Calynn Irwin	Halfpipe	23.25	16.25	23.25	23	Did not advance				
Mercedes Nicoll	Halfpipe	50.00	48.00	50.00	18	Did not advance				

Qualification Legend: QF – Qualify directly to final

Parallel

Athlete	Event	Qualification		Round of 16	Quarterfinal	Semifinal	Final	
Athlete	Event	Time	Rank	Opposition Time	Opposition Time	Opposition Time	Opposition Time	Rank
Jasey-Jay Anderson	Men's giant slalom	1:26.76	24	Did not advance				
Darren Gardner	Men's giant slalom	1:26.94	28	Did not advance				

Qualification Legend: W – Winner; L – Loser

Snowboard cross

Athlete	Event	Seeding						1/8 final	Quarterfinal	Semifinal	Final	
Athlete	Event	Run 1		Run 2		Best	Seed	1/8 final	Quarterfinal	Semifinal	Final	
Athlete	Event	Time	Rank	Time	Rank	Best	Seed	Position	Position	Position	Position	Rank
Baptiste Brochu	Men's snowboard cross	DNS						Did not advance				
Éliot Grondin	Men's snowboard cross	1:28.89	39	1:15.93	7	1:15.93	34	DNF	Did not advance			
Kevin Hill	Men's snowboard cross	1:14.24	8	Bye		1:14.24	8	2 Q	4	Did not advance		
Chris Robanske	Men's snowboard cross	1:14.35	11	Bye		1:14.35	11	2 Q	3 Q	DNF	Did not advance	
Zoe Bergermann	Women's snowboard cross	1:21.57	=16	1:18.65	1	1:18.65	13	—N/a	DNF	Did not advance		
Carle Brenneman	Women's snowboard cross	1:21.57	=16	1:20.89	6	1:20.89	18	—N/a	4	Did not advance		
Tess Critchlow	Women's snowboard cross	1:21.39	15	1:21.83	8	1:21.39	20	—N/a	2 Q	4 FB	3	9
Meryeta O'Dine	Women's snowboard cross	DNS						Did not advance				

Qualification legend: FA – Qualify to medal round; FB – Qualify to consolation round

== Speed skating ==
Canada earned the following quotas at the conclusion of the four World Cup's used for qualification. Five athletes were pre-selected for the games after their results from the World Cup (Alex Boisvert-Lacroix, Ivanie Blondin, Ted-Jan Bloemen, Olivier Jean and Keri Morrison). The rest of the team will be named after the Canadian trials held in Calgary from January 4 to 9, 2018. The official team was named on January 10, 2018. The team consists of 19 athletes (10 men and 9 women), which is one less than the maximum the country could have sent to the games. Canada also did not nominate a third skater in the women's 500 and 1000 metres events.

Men

Athlete	Event	Race	
Athlete	Event	Time	Rank
Jordan Belchos	10000 m	12:59.51	5
Ted-Jan Bloemen	5000 m	6:11.616	2nd place, silver medalist(s)
Ted-Jan Bloemen	10000 m	12:39.77	1st place, gold medalist(s)
Alex Boisvert-Lacroix	500 m	34.934	11
Vincent De Haître	1000 m	1:09.79	19
Vincent De Haître	1500 m	1:47.32	21
Ben Donnelly	1500 m	1:49.68	31
Laurent Dubreuil	500 m	35.16	18
Laurent Dubreuil	1000 m	1:10.03	25
Gilmore Junio	500 m	35.158	17
Denny Morrison	1500 m	1:46.36	13
Alexandre St-Jean	1000 m	1:09.24	11

Women

Athlete	Event	Race	
Athlete	Event	Time	Rank
Ivanie Blondin	3000 m	4:04.14	6
Ivanie Blondin	5000 m	6:59.38	5
Kali Christ	1500 m	1:59.42	19
Marsha Hudey	500 m	37.88	10
Kaylin Irvine	1000 m	1:16.90	23
Heather McLean	500 m	38.29	14
Heather McLean	1000 m	1:17.25	25
Josie Morrison	1500 m	1:59.77	21
Brianne Tutt	1500 m	1:58.77	15
Brianne Tutt	3000 m	4:13.70	20
Isabelle Weidemann	3000 m	4:04.26	7
Isabelle Weidemann	5000 m	6:59.88	6

Mass start

Athlete	Event	Semifinal			Final		
Athlete	Event	Points	Time	Rank	Points	Time	Rank
Olivier Jean	Men's mass start	4	8:42.31	7	0	7:49.30	14
Ivanie Blondin	Women's mass start	1	8:53.92	10	Did not advance		
Keri Morrison	Women's mass start	21	8:54.25	3 Q	0	8:41.38	12

Team pursuit

Athlete	Event	Quarterfinal		Semifinal		Final	
Athlete	Event	Time	Rank	Opposition Time	Rank	Opposition Time	Rank
Jordan Belchos; Ted-Jan Bloemen; Denny Morrison	Men's team pursuit	3:41.73	7 FD	Did not advance		Final D United States; W 3:42.16	7
Ivanie Blondin; Josie Morrison; Keri Morrison; Isabelle Weidemann	Women's team pursuit	2:59.02	3 Q	Japan; L 3:01.84	2 FB	Final B United States; L 2:59.72	4

== See also ==
- Canada at the 2018 Winter Paralympics
- Canada at the 2018 Commonwealth Games
- Canada at the 2018 Summer Youth Olympics
