= Cross-country skiing at the 2018 Winter Olympics – Men's 4 × 10 kilometre relay =

Men's 4 × 10 kilometre relay at the XXIII Olympic Winter Games
- Cross-country skiing
- Venue: Alpensia Cross-Country Skiing Centre
- Dates: 18 February 2018
- Competitors: 56 from 14 nations
- Winning time: 1:33:04.9

Medalists
1st place, gold medalist(s)		Didrik Tønseth; Martin Johnsrud Sundby; Simen Hegstad Krüger; Johannes Høsflot Klæbo	Norway
2nd place, silver medalist(s)		Andrey Larkov; Alexander Bolshunov; Aleksey Chervotkin; Denis Spitsov	Olympic Athletes from Russia
3rd place, bronze medalist(s)		Jean-Marc Gaillard; Maurice Manificat; Clément Parisse; Adrien Backscheider	France

The men's 4 × 10 kilometre relay cross-country skiing competition at the 2018 Winter Olympics was held on 18 February 2018 at 15:15 KST at the Alpensia Cross-Country Skiing Centre in Pyeongchang, South Korea.

== Qualification ==
A total of up to 310 cross-country skiers qualified across all eleven events. Athletes qualified for this event by having met the A qualification standard, which meant having 100 or less FIS Points in either the sprint or distance classification. The Points list takes into average the best results of athletes per discipline during the qualification period (1 July 2016 to 21 January 2018). Countries received additional quotas by having athletes ranked in the top 30 of the FIS Olympics Points list (two per gender maximum, overall across all events). Countries also received an additional quota (one per gender maximum) if an athlete was ranked in the top 300 of the FIS Olympics Points list. After the distribution of B standard quotas, the remaining quotas were distributed using the Olympic FIS Points list, with each athlete only counting once for qualification purposes. A country could only enter the event if it had qualified at least four male athletes, and a country could enter only one team.

== Competition schedule ==
All times are (UTC+9).

Date	Time	Event
18 February	15:15	Final

== Results ==
The race was started at 15:15.

Rank	Bib	Country	Time	Deficit
1st place, gold medalist(s)	1	Norway; Didrik Tønseth; Martin Johnsrud Sundby; Simen Hegstad Krüger; Johannes Høsflot Klæbo	1:33:04.9; 24:59.1; 24:51.8; 21:19.7; 21:54.3	—
2nd place, silver medalist(s)	2	Olympic Athletes from Russia; Andrey Larkov; Alexander Bolshunov; Aleksey Chervotkin; Denis Spitsov	1:33:14.3; 24:42.1; 24:36.7; 22:08.0; 21:47.5	+9.4
3rd place, bronze medalist(s)	7	France; Jean-Marc Gaillard; Maurice Manificat; Clément Parisse; Adrien Backscheider	1:33:41.8; 24:51.7; 24:55.1; 21:24.2; 22:30.8	+36.9
4	5	Finland; Perttu Hyvärinen; Iivo Niskanen; Matti Heikkinen; Lari Lehtonen	1:34:45.4; 25:42.9; 24:29.8; 21:56.5; 22:36.2	+1:40.5
5	3	Sweden; Jens Burman; Daniel Rickardsson; Marcus Hellner; Calle Halfvarsson	1:35:10.5; 25:17.8; 25:57.0; 21:53.3; 22:02.4	+2:05.6
6	6	Germany; Andreas Katz; Thomas Bing; Lucas Bögl; Jonas Dobler	1:35:13.1; 25:55.5; 25:17.2; 21:56.6; 22:03.8	+2:08.2
7	8	Italy; Maicol Rastelli; Francesco De Fabiani; Giandomenico Salvadori; Federico Pellegrino	1:35:40.1; 24:50.9; 24:52.4; 22:39.1; 23:17.7	+2:35.2
8	12	Canada; Len Väljas; Graeme Killick; Russell Kennedy; Knute Johnsgaard	1:36:45.9; 25:56.3; 25:15.9; 22:06.7; 23:27.0	+3:41.0
9	11	Czech Republic; Aleš Razým; Martin Jakš; Petr Knop; Michal Novák	1:37:23.0; 25:55.9; 25:22.0; 22:33.5; 23:31.6	+4:18.1
10	4	Switzerland; Jonas Baumann; Dario Cologna; Toni Livers; Roman Furger	1:38:01.4; 26:43.7; 24:55.6; 23:08.9; 23:13.2	+4:56.5
11	10	United States; Andrew Newell; Reese Hanneman; Scott Patterson; Noah Hoffman	1:42:29.1; 26:09.7; 28:17.7; 22:58.8; 25:02.9	+9:24.2
DSQ	9	Kazakhstan; Alexey Poltoranin; Yevgeniy Velichko; Vitaliy Pukhkalo; Denis Volotka	~~1:36:36.3~~; 24:40.9; 25:29.1; 23:10.3; 23:16.0	~~+3:31.4~~
DSQ	13	Estonia; Andreas Veerpalu; Algo Kärp; Karel Tammjärv; Raido Ränkel	~~1:38:21.7~~; 26:17.7; 26:28.8; 22:06.5; 23:28.7	~~+5:16.8~~
DSQ	14	Austria; Dominik Baldauf; Max Hauke; Bernhard Tritscher; Luis Stadlober	~~1:39:12.9~~; 26:09.4; 26:22.2; 22:40.8; 24:00.5	~~+6:08.0~~
