= Killick (disambiguation) =

Killick may refer to:

- Killick or Admiral Killick, a coast guard and navy base of Haiti
- Killick hitch, a type of hitch knot
- Killick, a slang term for Leading Seaman
- The Killick: A Newfoundland Story, by Geoff Butler, a GG-nominated piece of literature, see 1995 Governor General's Awards
- A type of small anchor

People with the name of "Killick"

- Killick (name)
- Hammerton Killick, an admiral in the Haitian Navy
