= Ted Alletson =

English cricketer

Cricket information
- Batting: Right-handed

Career statistics
Competition	First-class
Matches	119
Runs scored	3,217
Batting average	18.59
100s/50s	1/13
Top score	189
Balls bowled	1,253
Wickets	33
Bowling average	19.03
5 wickets in innings	1
10 wickets in match	0
Best bowling	6/74
Catches/stumpings	74/–
- Source: CricInfo, 7 November 2022

Edwin Boaler Alletson (6 March 1884 – 5 July 1963) played English county cricket for Nottinghamshire County Cricket Club during the early years of the 20th century. He was predominantly selected by Nottinghamshire as a right-handed batsman and a not-very-successful fast bowler and, with one exception, his career was unspectacular. Over the 179 innings of his career, he passed 50 runs only 14 times, and converted just one of those 50s to a century.

Alletson secured his place in cricket history with one record-breaking innings played against Sussex County Cricket Club in May 1911. The innings rescued the game for Nottinghamshire and became known as Alletson's Innings. He never repeated this success. His career ended three years later, when he was 30, when cricket was suspended at the onset of World War I. He died in 1963, aged 79.

== Alletson's Innings ==
On Saturday, 20 May 1911, Alletson's Nottinghamshire were playing Sussex at Hove. Nottinghamshire were facing defeat when Alletson, a tailender, came out to bat at number nine in the order, with the score 185 for seven. Having conceded a first-innings deficit of 176, Nottinghamshire were only 9 runs ahead. The eighth wicket fell at 258 and the ninth soon followed, leaving Nottinghamshire 260 for nine.

The teams came in for the lunch interval, with Alletson 47 not out. He asked his captain for advice on how to play after the resumption. On being told "I don't think it matters what you do", Alletson replied, "Then I'm not half going to give Killick [a Sussex bowler] some stick." Alletson was known for being a "blocker", but after lunch he attacked the Sussex bowling, particularly Killick's. In a spell of sustained hitting, Alletson broke the world record for runs scored off a single over by hitting Killick for 34, one of his shots smashing the pavilion clock and another "destroying" the pavilion bar. Team-mates later revealed that as the innings developed Killick was frightened to bowl to Alletson in case he clouted the ball straight back at him. Alletson was eventually out having scored a career-best 189.

His innings lasted just 90 minutes (his post-lunch effort was 142 runs in just 40 minutes) and included eight sixes. He scored 142 out of 152 added for the tenth wicket. During one period of his innings he hit 115 off seven overs. Alletson's 34 runs in a single over included two no-balls and read 4, 6, 6, 0, 4, 4, 4, 6. This new world record for first-class cricket lasted for 57 years until Garry Sobers hit 36 off an over in 1968.

There was speculation that the fielder was over the boundary rope when he took the catch to dismiss Alletson: if this was the case then according to the laws of cricket Alletson should have been credited with six more runs rather than being given out. Anyway, Alletson had done enough to save the match: it ended in a draw, with Sussex, who needed 237 to win, making 213 for eight. Alletson was rewarded for his achievement by the Duke of Portland, who awarded him a gold watch. It was later revealed that Alletson had batted with an injured wrist.

The media gave a lot of attention to the innings at the time. Some still regard it as the most explosive innings ever. Nottinghamshire's George Gunn said Alletson had hit the ball harder than anyone he had seen. Years later he told John Arlott: "Ted sent his drives skimming; you could hear them hum; he drove several at the Relf brothers and the ball fizzed through them as if they were ghosts. I have never seen another innings like it."

== Subsequent career ==
The famous innings marked Alletson's transition from a blocker to a 'biffer'. It earned him a trial for the England side a fortnight later, but he scored only 15 and 8. Five days after his Hove innings he made 60 in 30 minutes against Gloucestershire, and in 1913 he scored 69 in 47 minutes against Sussex, 88 in 60 minutes against Derbyshire and 55 in 25 minutes against Leicestershire. That summer at Dewsbury he also drove three consecutive balls from Wilfred Rhodes for sixes, but he never lived up to his fabled performance. His most successful season was 1913, when he scored 634 runs at a modest average of 21.13, as well as taking six wickets for 43 to help Nottinghamshire defeat the eventual champions Kent at Trent Bridge. Isolated successes like these were highlights of an otherwise uneventful career. He played his final season of County cricket in 1914, the last season before the First World War.
