= Harry Killick =

English cricketer

Personal information
- Full name: Harry Killick
- Born: 13 July 1837; Crabtree, Sussex, England
- Died: 22 November 1877 (aged 40); Brighton, Sussex, England
- Batting: Left-handed
- Bowling: Right-arm roundarm medium
- Role: Occasional wicket-keeper
- Relatives: Ernest Killick (nephew)

Domestic team information
- Years: Team
- 1866–1875: Sussex

Career statistics
| Competition | First-class |
|---|---|
| Matches | 44 |
| Runs scored | 1,097 |
| Batting average | 14.43 |
| 100s/50s | –/2 |
| Top score | 78 |
| Balls bowled | 564 |
| Wickets | 6 |
| Bowling average | 36.50 |
| 5 wickets in innings | – |
| 10 wickets in match | – |
| Best bowling | 3/37 |
| Catches/stumpings | 25/– |
- Source: Cricinfo, 12 July 2012

Harry Killick (13 July 1837 – 22 November 1877) was an English cricketer. Killick was a left-handed batsman who bowls right-arm roundarm medium. He was born at Crabtree, Sussex.

Killick made his first-class debut for Sussex against Surrey at The Oval in 1866. Killick played first-class cricket for Sussex to 1875, making a total of forty appearances, the last of which came against Hampshire at the County Ground, Hove. In his forty first-class appearances for the county, he scored 957 runs at an average of 14.07, with a high score of 78. This score was his only half century for Sussex and came against Surrey in 1869. With the ball, he took 6 wickets at a bowling average of 36.50, with best figures of 3/37.

In addition to playing first-class cricket for Sussex, Killick made first-class appearances for other teams. He made a single first-class appearance for a Left Handed team against a Right Handed at Lord's in 1870, a match in which he recorded his only other first-class half century with a score of 55. In that same year he made a single appearance for the Players of the South against the Gentlemen of the South at The Oval, as well as making his first appearance for a United South of England Eleven against a United North of England Eleven. He made a second appearance for the United South of England Eleven against Yorkshire in 1874. As well as playing the game, Killick also umpired it, standing in nineteen first-class matches from 1873 1877.

He died at Brighton, Sussex, on 22 November 1877. His nephew, Ernest Killick, also played first-class cricket.
