= Keri Morrison =

Canadian speed skater

Personal information
- Born: July 3, 1991 (age 35) Niza, Saitama, Japan
- Height: 173 cm (5 ft 8 in)
- Weight: 60 kg (132 lb)

Sport
- Country: Canada
- Sport: Speed skating

Achievements and titles
- Olympic finals: 2018 Winter Olympics
- Highest world ranking: 500=39.61; 1,000=1.15:61; 1,500=1.56:67; 3,000=4.10:43

Keri Morrison (born July 3, 1991) is a Canadian speed skater.

== Career ==
=== 2018 Winter Olympics ===
In January 2018, Morrison was named to Canada's 2018 Olympic team.
