= Irene Cadurisch =

Swiss biathlete (born 1991)

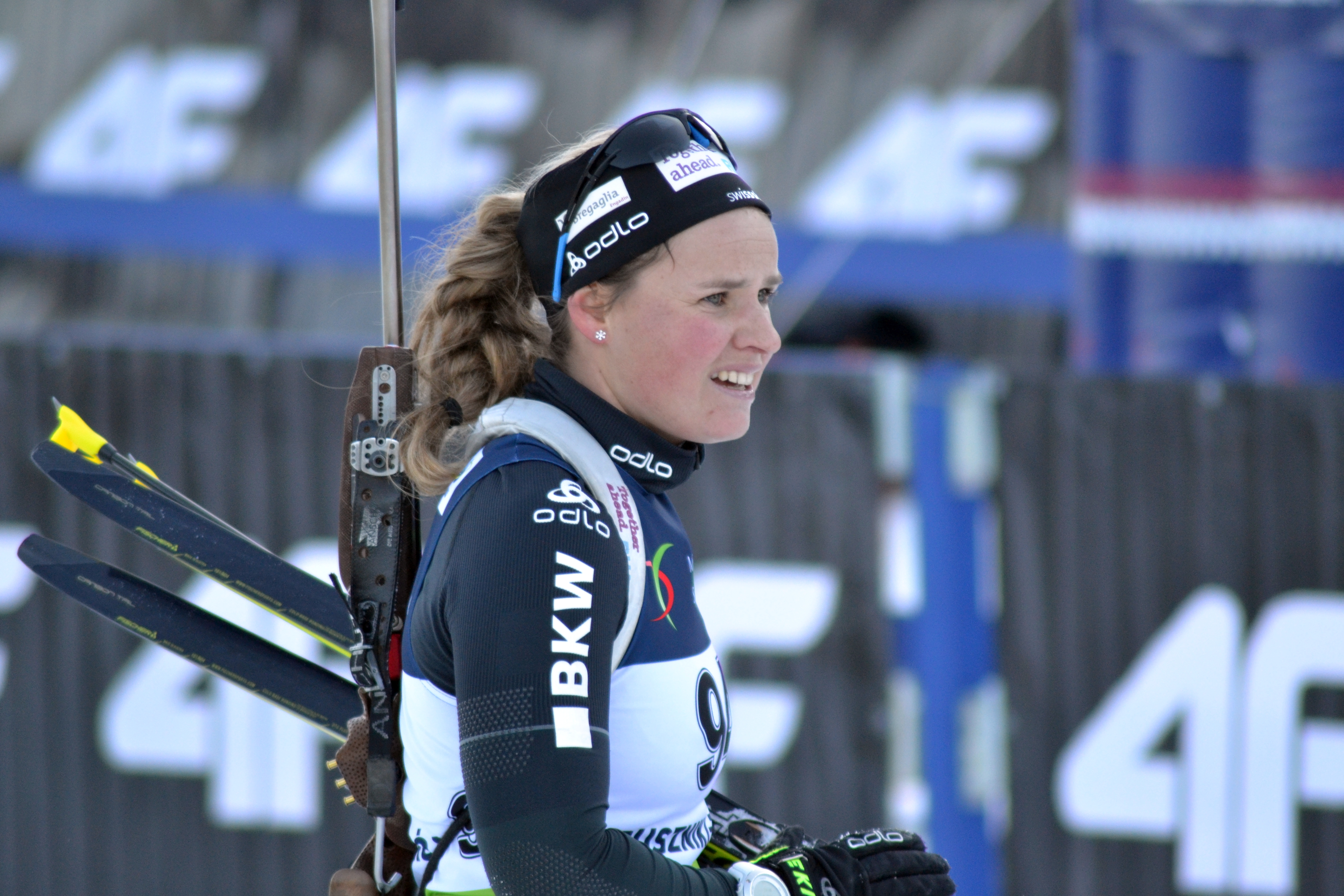
- Cadurish at the European Championships 2017

Personal information
- Nationality: Swiss
- Born: 23 October 1991 (age 34) Samedan, Switzerland

Sport

Irene Cadurisch (born 23 October 1991) is a Swiss biathlete. She competed at the Biathlon World Championships 2012, with the Swiss relay team. She competed at the 2014 Winter Olympics in Sochi, in the individual race.

== Career results ==
=== Olympic Games ===
0 medals

Event	Individual	Sprint	Pursuit	Mass start	Relay	Mixed relay
(Russia) 2014 Sochi	37th	—	—	—	8th	—
(South Korea) 2018 Pyeongchang	—	8th	16th	28th	6th	—
(China) 2022 Beijing	—	—	—	—	DNF	—

=== World Championships ===
0 medals

Event	Individual	Sprint	Pursuit	Mass start	Relay	Mixed relay	Single mixed relay
(Slovenia) 2021 Pokljuka	8th	—	—	—	—	—	9th
