= Julia Ransom =

Canadian biathlete

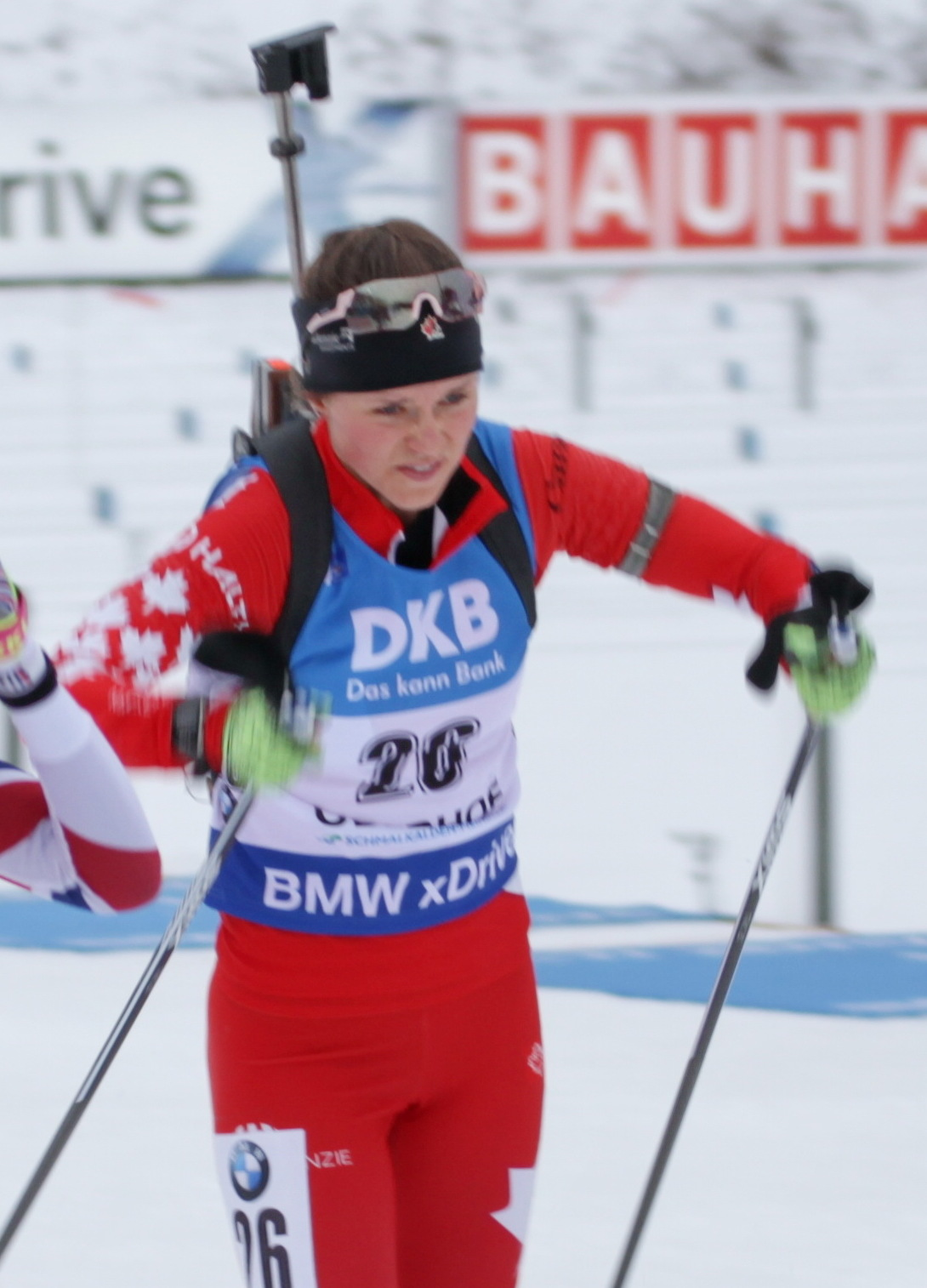
- Ransom in Oberhof in 2018

Personal information
- Nationality: Canadian
- Born: 4 February 1993 (age 33) Penticton, British Columbia

Sport
- Sport: Biathlon
Medal record
Youth World Championships
Silver medal – second place	2012 Kontiolahti	7.5 km pursuit

Julia Ransom (born 4 February 1993) is a Canadian retired biathlete from Penticton, British Columbia. She competed in the 2013/14 and 2014/15 World Cup seasons and represented Canada at the Biathlon World Championships 2015 in Kontiolahti.

== Career ==
=== 2018 Winter Olympics ===
In January 2018, Ransom was named to Canada's 2018 Olympic team, where she finished 40th in the women's sprint.

== Biathlon results ==
All results are sourced from the International Biathlon Union.

=== Olympic Games ===
0 medals

Event	Individual	Sprint	Pursuit	Mass start	Relay	Mixed relay
(South Korea) 2018 Pyeongchang	74th	40th	28th	—	10th	12th

=== World Championships ===
0 medals

Event	Individual	Sprint	Pursuit	Mass start	Relay	Mixed relay
(Finland) 2015 Kontiolahti	84th	51st	56th	—	9th	—
(Norway) 2016 Oslo	20th	50th	42nd	—	15th	11th
(Austria) 2017 Hochfilzen	18th	65th	—	—	16th	13th

*During Olympic seasons competitions are only held for those events not included in the Olympic program.
