= Marie Killick =

English audio engineer (1914–1964)

Maria Killick
- Born: Maria Benson; 1914
- Died: 1964 (aged 49–50)
- Occupation: Audio Engineer
- Known for: Patented the truncated-tip sapphire stylus.

Marie Louise Killick (in some sources Maria, 1914–1964; née Benson) was an English audio engineer who patented the truncated-tip sapphire stylus in 1945 for playing gramophone records. The tradename of her invention was Sapphox.

== Early life ==
Killick's father, John, was an engineer. He trained her in precision engineering as a young girl. Killick studied sound recording in Antwerp.

== Inventions ==
During World War II, she worked for the army making sound equipment (steel cutters for master recordings on wax discs). She borrowed £300 from a bank to start a business producing more and was awarded a contract with the War Office. She made cutters for recordings on the battlefields and designed a portable recorder for them to use.

At the time, recordings were played with steel needles that could destroy the record. Killick invented a stylus using a sapphire or diamond gemstone. Her stylus had better sound quality and did not damage the record because it would ride the sides of the record groove, not the bottom. She filed her patent application on 25 October 1945 and was granted a full Letters Patent, No. 603,606 on 18 June 1948.

Her stylus was marketed under the name Sapphox and was manufactured in London.

Decca offered her £750,000 for her rights to the patent but she refused. Killick invented a machine which produced 10,000 units a week. In 1945, she filed a patent for her Sapphire Lapping Machine.

In 1949 Marie received a letter from Circuits Management Association Ltd praising the outstanding sound quality of Sapphox. The management placed Sapphox in their Odeon cinema in Leicester Square in London and, during the six month run of the film Hamlet, they used Sapphox on the two sets of records played during the interval of the film. The quality of the sound was such they were going to use Sapphox in all their cinemas as new installations were made.

The business was doing so well she had a private secretary, large house and a governess for her children but three years later she went out of business.

== Patent infringement ==
In 1953, Killian was involved with a lawsuit against Pye Ltd. (Killick v Pye Ltd) for their infringement of her patent. They had created a style called the Universal Stylus, an infringement on her Letters Patent. Killick won the suit in the High Court of Justice 1957. Pye Radio appealed but the judgement of the lower court, that they had infringed, was upheld in 1958. However, her bankruptcy in the following year prevented her from profiting from the outcome which could have been in the millions.

She died in Guildford, Surrey, England, at age 49, with no money and homeless.

== Personal life ==
Marie had four children. Her daughter, Cynthia, has written a book about her mother's experience, including how she was kidnapped and forced to live in a builder's yard with her children as a result of tactics used to try to scare her from continuing her legal fight against Pye.
