= Anthony Killick =

English cricketer

Personal information
- Full name: Anthony Killick
- Born: 26 November 1829; Withyham, Sussex, England
- Died: 8 December 1881 (aged 52); Uckfield, Sussex, England
- Batting: Unknown

Domestic team information
- Years: Team
- 1866: Sussex

Career statistics
Competition	First-class
Matches	1
Runs scored	0
Batting average	0.00
100s/50s	–/–
Top score	0
Balls bowled	–
Wickets	–
Bowling average	–
5 wickets in innings	–
10 wickets in match	–
Best bowling	–
Catches/stumpings	–/–
- Source: Cricinfo, 1 July 2012

Anthony Killick (26 November 1829 – 8 December 1881) was an English cricketer. Killick's batting style is unknown. He was born at Withyham, Sussex.

Killick made a single first-class appearance for Sussex against Kent in 1866 at the Higher Common Ground, Tunbridge Wells. Kent batted first and made 80 all out, to which Sussex responded to in their first-innings by making 93 all out, during which Killick was dismissed for a duck by Edgar Willsher. Kent reached 20/5 in their second-innings, at which point the match was declared a draw. This was his only major appearance for Sussex.

He died at Uckfield, Sussex, on 8 December 1881.
