= Crabtree, West Sussex =

Hamlet in West Sussex, England

Coordinates: 51.01443°N 0.26177°W

Crabtree
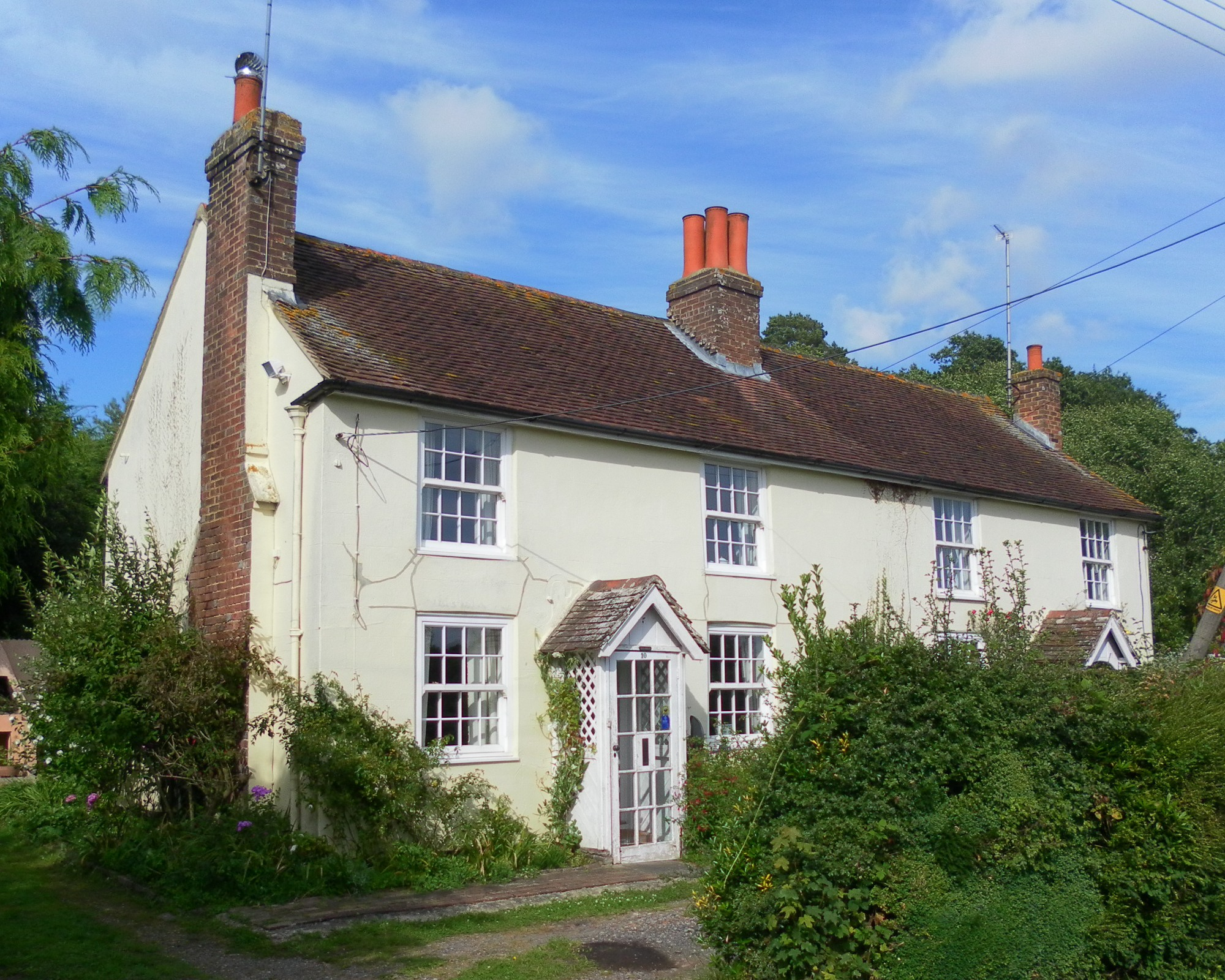
- Former Bethel Baptist Chapel, Crabtree

- Location within West Sussex
- OS grid reference: TQ220253
- Civil parish: Lower Beeding
- District: Horsham
- Shire county: West Sussex
- Region: South East
- Country: England
- Sovereign state: United Kingdom
- Post town: Horsham
- Postcode district: RH13 6
- Police: Sussex
- Fire: West Sussex
- Ambulance: South East Coast
- UK Parliament: Horsham

Crabtree is a hamlet in the parish of Lower Beeding and in Horsham District of West Sussex, England. It lies on the A281 road 4.4 miles (7.1 km) southeast of Horsham.
