= Ernest Killick =

English cricketer

Personal information
- Nickname: Tim
- Batting: Left-handed
- Bowling: Right-arm slow-medium

Career statistics
Competition	FC
Matches	461
Runs scored	18768
Batting average	26.17
100s/50s	22/?
Top score	200
Balls bowled	40595
Wickets	729
Bowling average	27.30
5 wickets in innings	25
10 wickets in match	1
Best bowling	7-10
Catches/stumpings	187/0
- Source: ESPNCricinfo

Ernest Harry "Tim" Killick (17 January 1875 – 29 September 1948) was an English first-class cricketer who played for Sussex from 1893 to 1913.

In 1911, Killick earned an unwanted place in cricket history. In the first innings against Nottinghamshire he took 5 for 14, but in the second innings Ted Alletson hit one of his overs for 34 runs. For 57 years, this was the most runs scored in an over of first-class cricket, until it was surpassed in 1968 by Garry Sobers, who hit 36 off Malcolm Nash.

In the United Kingdom, wearing glasses was characterised in the nineteenth century, as "a sure sign of the weakling and the mollycoddle", according to Neville Cardus, writing in 1928. Tim Killick was the first professional cricketer to play while wearing glasses "continuously", after his vision deteriorated in 1897. "With their aid he placed himself in the forefront among English professionals of all-round abilities.”

His uncle, Harry Killick, also played first-class cricket.
