= Len Väljas =

Canadian cross-country skier

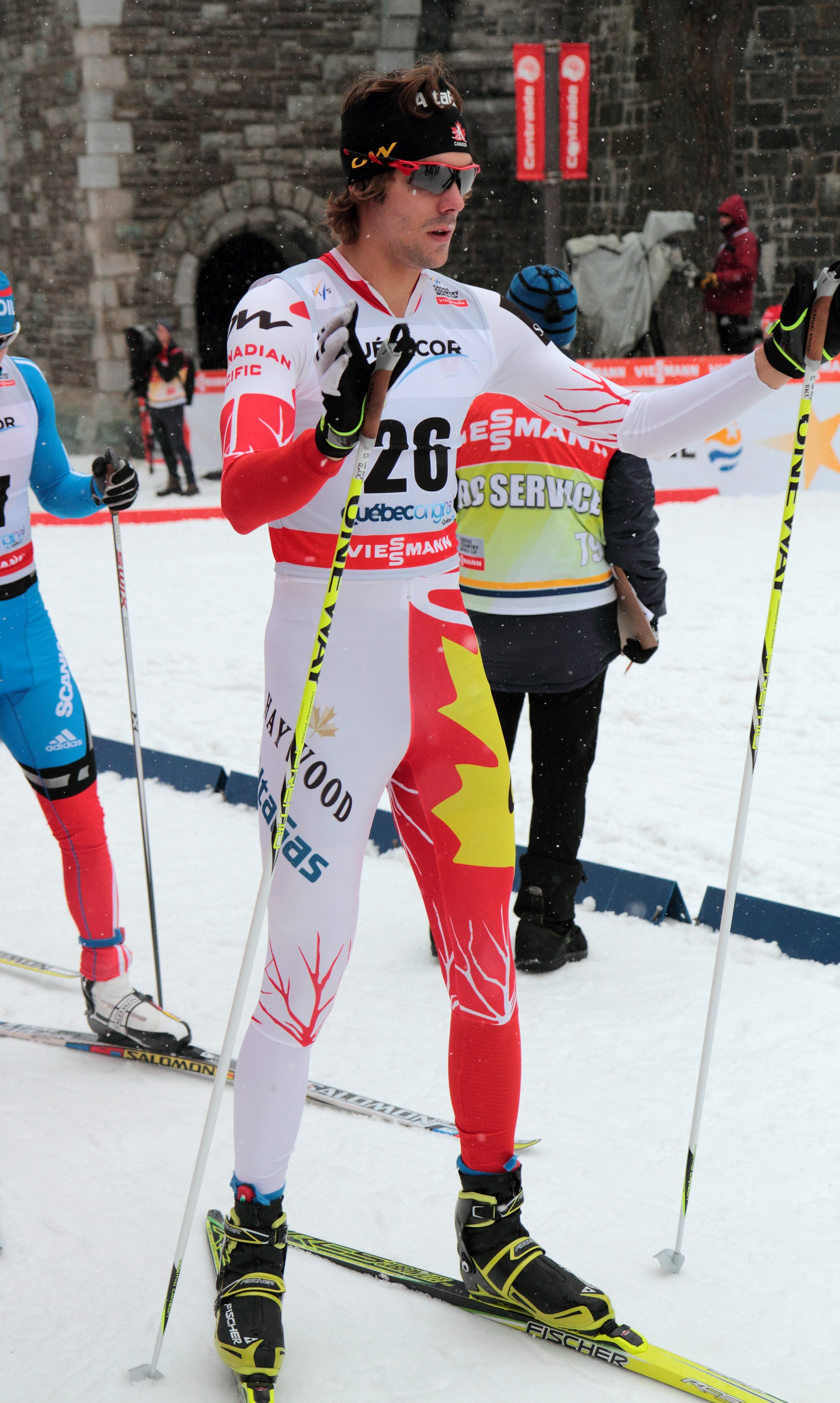
- Len Väljas in Quebec, 2012

Personal information
- Nationality: Canada
- Born: 21 November 1988 (age 37) Toronto, Ontario, Canada

Sport
- Sport: Skiing
- Club: Team Hardwood

World Cup career
- Seasons: 10 – (2009, 2011–2019)
- Indiv. starts: 130
- Indiv. podiums: 5
- Indiv. wins: 0
- Team starts: 16
- Team podiums: 2
- Team wins: 1
- Overall titles: 0 – (23rd in 2013)
- Discipline titles: 0
- Updated on 2 April 2019

Lennard "Len" Väljas (born 21 November 1988) is a Canadian former cross-country skier. He was born in Toronto, and is of Estonian descent. He is the younger brother of Canadian beach volleyball Olympian Kristina May.

Väljas competed at the sprint event at the World Ski Championships 2011 in Oslo where he placed 15th.

Väljas achieved his first podium finish on the World Cup on March 7, 2012, in a Sprint Classic races in Drammen, Norway.

He announced his retirement from cross-country skiing in March 2019.

== Cross-country skiing results ==
All results are sourced from the International Ski Federation (FIS).

=== Olympic Games ===
Year	Age	15 km individual	30 km skiathlon	50 km mass start	Sprint	4 × 10 km relay	Team sprint
2014	26	—	—	—	36	12	—
2018	30	—	—	—	7	9	8

=== World Championships ===
Year	Age	15 km individual	30 km skiathlon	50 km mass start	Sprint	4 × 10 km relay	Team sprint
2011	23	48	—	—	15	12	—
2013	25	—	—	—	40	12	—
2015	27	—	—	—	14	10	13
2017	29	—	—	—	48	12	6
2019	31	47	—	—	50	12	10

=== World Cup ===
==== Season standings ====
Season	Age	Season standings			Ski Tour standings			
Season	Age	Overall	Distance	Sprint	Nordic Opening	Tour de Ski	World Cup Final	Ski Tour Canada
2009	21	NC	—	NC	—N/a	—	—	—N/a
2011	23	90	—	48	DNF	—	—	—N/a
2012	24	28	49	12	29	—	14	—N/a
2013	25	23	43	8	DNF	23	48	—N/a
2014	26	NC	—	NC	DNF	—	—	—N/a
2015	27	74	NC	33	71	DNF	—N/a	—N/a
2016	28	73	NC	35	DNF	DNF	—N/a	DNF
2017	29	41	NC	16	48	DNF	54th	—N/a
2018	30	NC	NC	NC	44	—	—	—N/a
2019	31	NC	NC	NC	—	DNF	38	—N/a

==== Individual podiums ====
- 5 podiums – (1 WC, 4 SWC)

No.	Season	Date	Location	Race	Level	Place
1	2011–12	7 March 2012	Drammen, Norway	1.2 km Sprint C	World Cup	2nd
2	2011–12	14 March 2012	Stockholm, Sweden	1.0 km Sprint C	Stage World Cup	3rd
3	2011–12	17 March 2012	Falun, Sweden	15 km Mass Start C	Stage World Cup	3rd
4	2012–13	1 January 2013	Val Müstair, Switzerland	1.4 km Sprint F	Stage World Cup	3rd
5	2012–13	5 January 2013	Val di Fiemme, Italy	15 km Mass Start C	Stage World Cup	2nd

==== Team podiums ====
- 1 victory – (1 TS)
- 2 podiums – (1 RL, 1 TS)

No.	Season	Date	Location	Race	Level	Place	Teammate(s)
1	2016–17	15 January 2017	Toblach, Italy	6 × 1.3 km Team Sprint F	World Cup	1st	Harvey
2	2016–17	22 January 2017	Ulricehamn, Sweden	4 × 7.5 km Relay C/F	World Cup	3rd	Kershaw / Harvey / Johnsgaard
