= Knute Johnsgaard =

Canadian cross-country skier

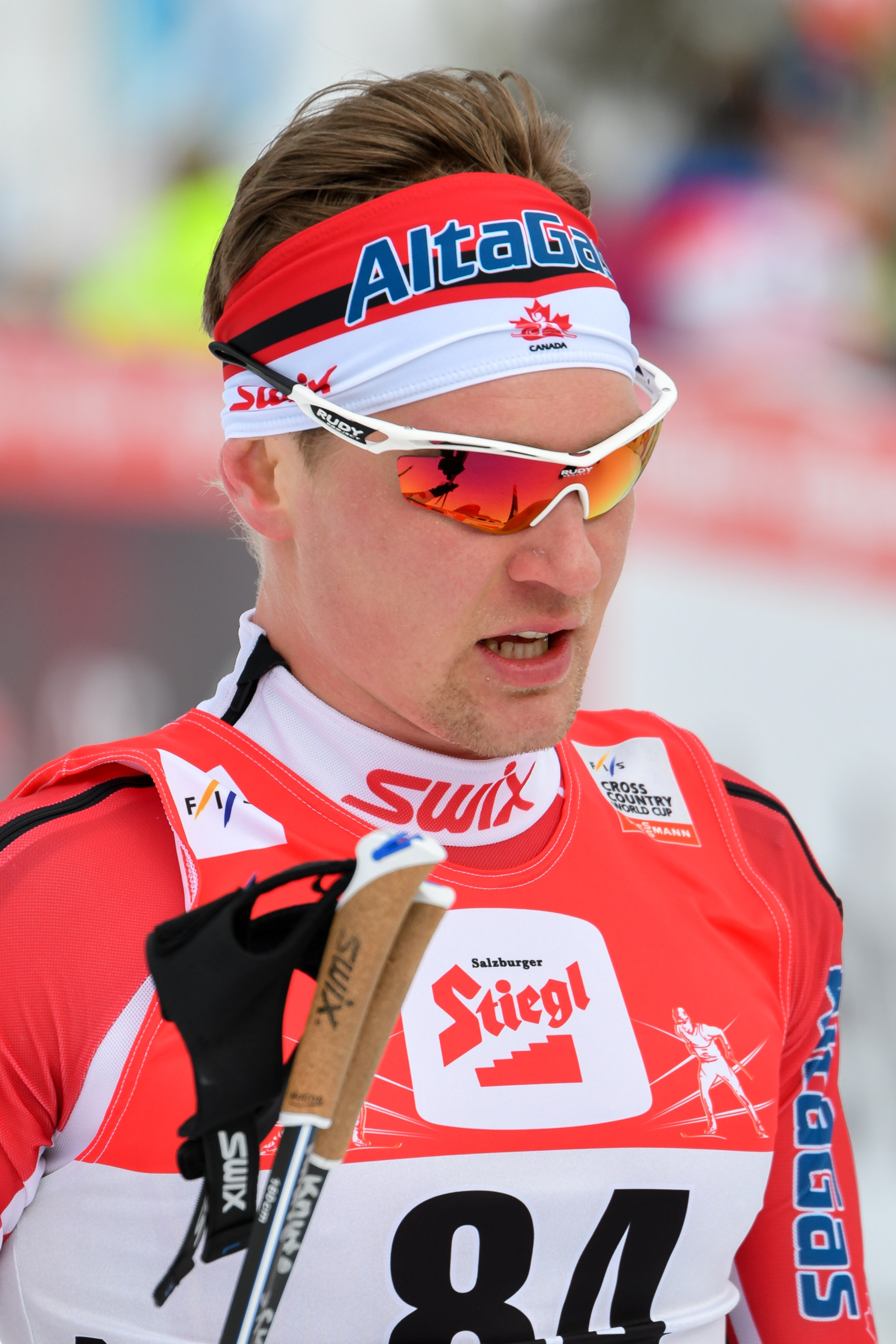

Personal information
- Nationality: Canada
- Born: 5 December 1992 (age 33) Whitehorse, Yukon, Canada

Sport
- Sport: Skiing
- Club: Whitehorse CC Ski Club

World Cup career
- Seasons: 4 – (2013, 2016–2018)
- Indiv. starts: 31
- Indiv. podiums: 0
- Team starts: 3
- Team podiums: 1
- Team wins: 0
- Overall titles: 0 – (152nd in 2016)
- Discipline titles: 0
- Updated on 4 December 2019

Knute Johnsgaard (born 5 December 1992 in Whitehorse, Yukon) is a Canadian cross-country skier. He competed in the 2018 Winter Olympics.

== Cross-country skiing results ==
All results are sourced from the International Ski Federation (FIS).

=== Olympic Games ===
Year	Age	15 km individual	30 km skiathlon	50 km mass start	Sprint	4 × 10 km relay	Team sprint
2018	26	69	62	—	—	9	—

=== World Championships ===
Year	Age	15 km individual	30 km skiathlon	50 km mass start	Sprint	4 × 10 km relay	Team sprint
2017	25	56	55	55	53	—	—

=== World Cup ===
==== Season standings ====
Season	Age	Discipline standings			Ski Tour standings			
Season	Age	Overall	Distance	Sprint	Nordic Opening	Tour de Ski	World Cup Final	Ski Tour Canada
2013	21	NC	NC	—	—	—	—	—N/a
2016	24	152	NC	101	—	—	—N/a	DNF
2017	25	NC	NC	NC	72	—	53	—N/a
2018	26	NC	NC	NC	81	—	—	—N/a

==== Team podiums ====
- 1 podium – (1 RL)

No.	Season	Date	Location	Race	Level	Place	Teammates
1	2016–17	22 January 2017	Ulricehamn, Sweden	4 × 7.5 km Relay C/F	World Cup	3rd	Kershaw / Harvey / Väljas
