= William Killick =

English cricketer

William Killick (14 May 1855 — 2 April 1938) was an English cricketer. He was a right-handed batsman who played for Surrey. He was born in Reigate and died in Horley.

Killick made a single first-class appearance for the team, during the 1876 season, against Nottinghamshire. Batting in the upper-middle order, he scored a duck in the first innings in which he batted, and three runs in the second.
