= Graeme Killick =

Canadian cross-country skier

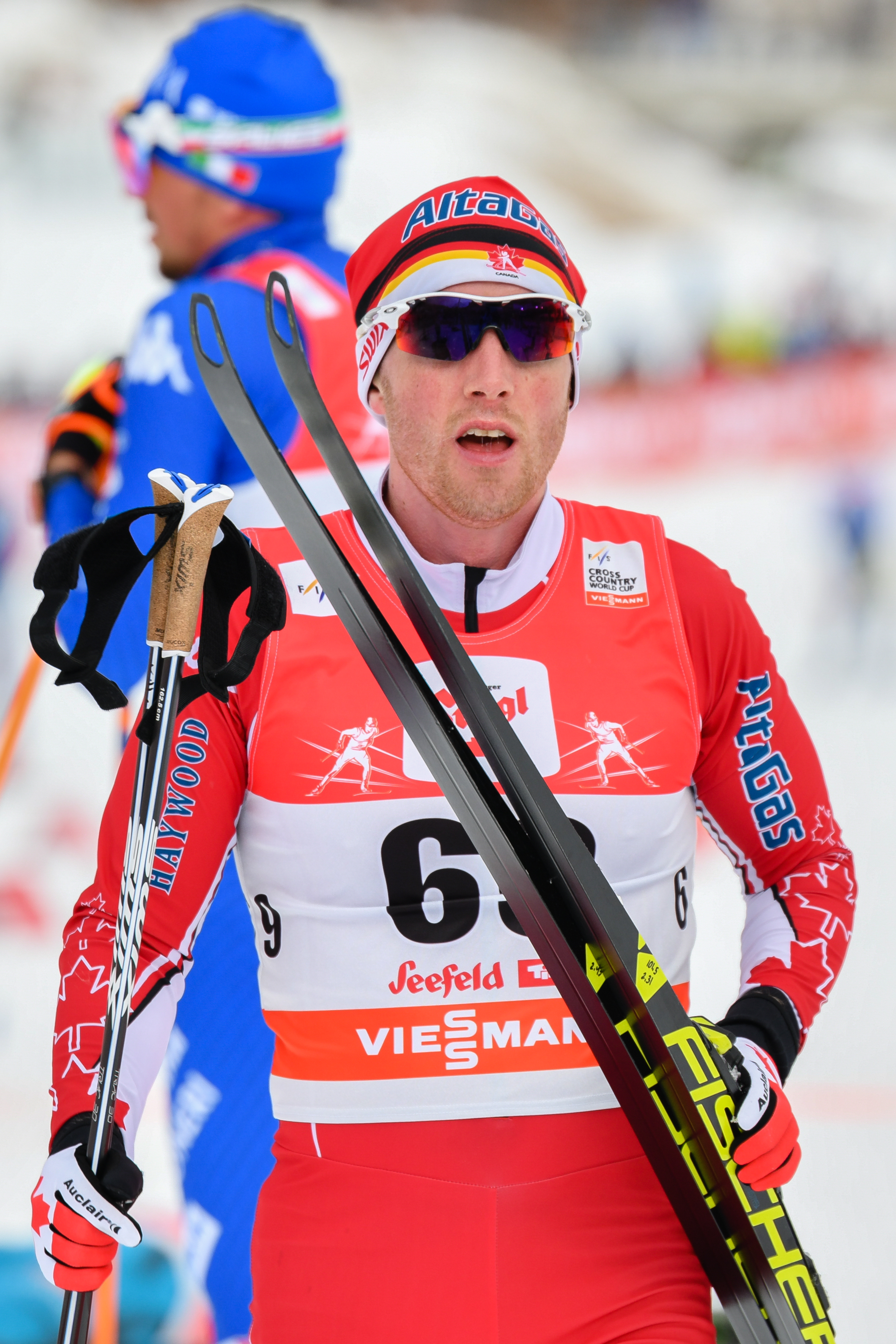

Graeme Killick (born 26 February 1989) is a Canadian cross-country skier on the Canadian national team. He participated in the 2009 Nordic Junior World Ski Championships in Praz de Lys-Sommand, France, where he placed 14th in the classic sprint, 15th in the 20 km pursuit, and 25th in the 10 km skate. He also competed in the 2010 Nordic U23 World Championships in Hinterzarten, Germany, where he recorded a 47th in the skate sprint, 25th in the 15 km classic, and 7th in the 30 km pursuit. At the end of the 2009–2010 season Killick recorded two national championship Open Men titles in the 15 km skate by a very large gap of 22.0 seconds and getting the win in the 10 km classic by 3.9seconds.
