= Curling at the 2018 Winter Olympics – Women's tournament =

Women's curling at the XXIII Olympic Winter Games
- Venue: Gangneung Curling Centre
- Dates: 14–25 February
- Competitors: 50 from 10 nations

Medalists
| 1st place, gold medalist(s) | | Anna Hasselborg; Sara McManus; Agnes Knochenhauer; Sofia Mabergs; Jennie Wåhlin | Sweden |
| 2nd place, silver medalist(s) | | Kim Eun-jung; Kim Kyeong-ae; Kim Seon-yeong; Kim Yeong-mi; Kim Cho-hi | South Korea |
| 3rd place, bronze medalist(s) | | Satsuki Fujisawa; Chinami Yoshida; Yumi Suzuki; Yurika Yoshida; Mari Motohashi | Japan |

The women's curling tournament of the 2018 Winter Olympics was held between 14 and 25 February 2018 at the Gangneung Curling Centre. Ten nations competed in a round robin preliminary round, and the top four nations at the conclusion of the round robin qualified for the medal round.

== Teams ==
The teams are listed as follows:

| Canada | China | Denmark | Great Britain | Japan |
|---|---|---|---|---|
| Ottawa CC, Ottawa: Skip: Rachel Homan; Third: Emma Miskew; Second: Joanne Courtney; Lead: Lisa Weagle; Alternate: Cheryl Bernard | Harbin CC, Harbin: Skip: Wang Bingyu; Third: Zhou Yan; Second: Liu Jinli; Lead: Ma Jingyi; Alternate: Jiang Xindi | Hvidovre CC, Hvidovre: Skip: Madeleine Dupont; Third: Denise Dupont; Second: Julie Høgh; Lead: Mathilde Halse; Alternate: Lina Knudsen | Royal Caledonian CC, Stirling: Skip: Eve Muirhead; Third: Anna Sloan; Second: Vicki Adams; Lead: Lauren Gray; Alternate: Kelly Schafer | Loco Solare CC, Kitami: Skip: Satsuki Fujisawa; Third: Chinami Yoshida; Second: Yumi Suzuki; Lead: Yurika Yoshida; Alternate: Mari Motohashi |
| Olympic Athletes from Russia | South Korea | Sweden | Switzerland | United States |
| CC Adamant, St. Petersburg: Skip: Victoria Moiseeva; Third: Uliana Vasilyeva; Second: Galina Arsenkina; Lead: Julia Guzieva; Alternate: Yulia Portunova | GyeongBuk Uiseong CC, Uiseong: Skip: Kim Eun-jung; Third: Kim Kyeong-ae; Second: Kim Seon-yeong; Lead: Kim Yeong-mi; Alternate: Kim Cho-hi | Sundbybergs CK, Sundbyberg: Skip: Anna Hasselborg; Third: Sara McManus; Second: Agnes Knochenhauer; Lead: Sofia Mabergs; Alternate: Jennie Wåhlin | CC Aarau, Aarau: Skip: Silvana Tirinzoni; Third: Esther Neuenschwander; Second: Manuela Siegrist; Lead: Marlene Albrecht; Alternate: Jenny Perret | Madison CC, Madison: Skip: Nina Roth; Third: Tabitha Peterson; Second: Aileen Geving; Lead: Rebecca Hamilton; Alternate: Cory Christensen |

== Round robin standings ==
Final round robin standings
| Team | Skip | Pld | W | L | PF | PA | EW | EL | BE | SE | S% | Qualification |
|---|---|---|---|---|---|---|---|---|---|---|---|---|
| South Korea | Kim Eun-jung | 9 | 8 | 1 | 75 | 44 | 41 | 34 | 5 | 15 | 79% | Playoffs |
| Sweden | Anna Hasselborg | 9 | 7 | 2 | 64 | 48 | 42 | 34 | 14 | 13 | 83% | Playoffs |
| Great Britain | Eve Muirhead | 9 | 6 | 3 | 61 | 56 | 39 | 38 | 12 | 6 | 79% | Playoffs |
| Japan | Satsuki Fujisawa | 9 | 5 | 4 | 59 | 55 | 38 | 36 | 10 | 13 | 75% | Playoffs |
| China | Wang Bingyu | 9 | 4 | 5 | 57 | 65 | 35 | 38 | 12 | 5 | 78% | |
| Canada | Rachel Homan | 9 | 4 | 5 | 68 | 59 | 40 | 36 | 10 | 12 | 81% | |
| Switzerland | Silvana Tirinzoni | 9 | 4 | 5 | 60 | 55 | 34 | 37 | 12 | 7 | 78% | |
| United States | Nina Roth | 9 | 4 | 5 | 56 | 65 | 38 | 39 | 7 | 6 | 78% | |
| Olympic Athletes from Russia | Victoria Moiseeva | 9 | 2 | 7 | 45 | 76 | 34 | 40 | 8 | 6 | 76% | |
| Denmark | Madeleine Dupont | 9 | 1 | 8 | 50 | 72 | 32 | 41 | 10 | 6 | 73% | |

== Round robin results ==
All draw times are listed in Seoul Time (UTC+09:00).

=== Summary ===
| Team | Canada | China | Denmark | Great Britain | Japan | Olympic Athlete From Russia | South Korea | Sweden | Switzerland | United States | Record |
|---|---|---|---|---|---|---|---|---|---|---|---|
| Canada | | 5–7 | 8–9 | 5–6 | 8–3 | 9–8 | 6–8 | 6–7 | 10–8 | 11–3 | 4–5 |
| China | 7–5 | | 10–7 | 7–8 | 7–6 | 6–7 | 5–12 | 4–8 | 7–2 | 4–10 | 4–5 |
| Denmark | 9–8 | 7–10 | | 6–7 | 5–8 | 7–8 | 3–9 | 3–9 | 4–6 | 6–7 | 1–8 |
| Great Britain | 6–5 | 8–7 | 7–6 | | 8–6 | 10–3 | 4–7 | 6–8 | 8–7 | 4–7 | 6–3 |
| Japan | 3–8 | 6–7 | 8–5 | 6–8 | | 10–5 | 7–5 | 5–4 | 4–8 | 10–5 | 5–4 |
| Olympic Athletes from Russia | 8–9 | 7–6 | 8–7 | 3–10 | 5–10 | | 2–11 | 4–5 | 2–11 | 6–7 | 2–7 |
| South Korea | 8–6 | 12–5 | 9–3 | 7–4 | 5–7 | 11–2 | | 7–6 | 7–5 | 9–6 | 8–1 |
| Sweden | 7–6 | 8–4 | 9–3 | 8–6 | 4–5 | 5–4 | 6–7 | | 8–7 | 9–6 | 7–2 |
| Switzerland | 8–10 | 2–7 | 6–4 | 7–8 | 8–4 | 11–2 | 5–7 | 7–8 | | 6–5 | 4–5 |
| United States | 3–11 | 10–4 | 7–6 | 7–4 | 5–10 | 7–6 | 6–9 | 6–9 | 5–6 | | 4–5 |

=== Draw 1 ===
Wednesday, 14 February, 14:05

| Sheet A | 1 | 2 | 3 | 4 | 5 | 6 | 7 | 8 | 9 | 10 | Final |
|---|---|---|---|---|---|---|---|---|---|---|---|
| Japan (Fujisawa) | 2 | 2 | 3 | 0 | 1 | 0 | 0 | 1 | 1 | X | 10 |
| United States (Roth) | 0 | 0 | 0 | 1 | 0 | 3 | 1 | 0 | 0 | X | 5 |

| Sheet B | 1 | 2 | 3 | 4 | 5 | 6 | 7 | 8 | 9 | 10 | Final |
|---|---|---|---|---|---|---|---|---|---|---|---|
| Olympic Athletes from Russia (Moiseeva) | 0 | 1 | 0 | 0 | 2 | 0 | 0 | X | X | X | 3 |
| Great Britain (Muirhead) | 3 | 0 | 2 | 1 | 0 | 0 | 4 | X | X | X | 10 |

| Sheet C | 1 | 2 | 3 | 4 | 5 | 6 | 7 | 8 | 9 | 10 | Final |
|---|---|---|---|---|---|---|---|---|---|---|---|
| Denmark (Dupont) | 0 | 0 | 0 | 1 | 0 | 0 | 2 | 0 | X | X | 3 |
| Sweden (Hasselborg) | 1 | 0 | 2 | 0 | 2 | 2 | 0 | 2 | X | X | 9 |

| Sheet D | 1 | 2 | 3 | 4 | 5 | 6 | 7 | 8 | 9 | 10 | Final |
|---|---|---|---|---|---|---|---|---|---|---|---|
| Switzerland (Tirinzoni) | 1 | 0 | 0 | 0 | 0 | 1 | 0 | 0 | X | X | 2 |
| China (Wang) | 0 | 2 | 1 | 1 | 0 | 0 | 0 | 3 | X | X | 7 |

=== Draw 2 ===
Thursday, 15 February, 09:05

| Sheet A | 1 | 2 | 3 | 4 | 5 | 6 | 7 | 8 | 9 | 10 | Final |
|---|---|---|---|---|---|---|---|---|---|---|---|
| Canada (Homan) | 0 | 1 | 0 | 0 | 0 | 2 | 1 | 0 | 0 | 2 | 6 |
| South Korea (Kim) | 1 | 0 | 0 | 1 | 2 | 0 | 0 | 1 | 3 | 0 | 8 |

| Sheet B | 1 | 2 | 3 | 4 | 5 | 6 | 7 | 8 | 9 | 10 | Final |
|---|---|---|---|---|---|---|---|---|---|---|---|
| Denmark (Dupont) | 0 | 0 | 0 | 3 | 0 | 1 | 0 | 0 | 1 | X | 5 |
| Japan (Fujisawa) | 0 | 2 | 1 | 0 | 0 | 0 | 3 | 2 | 0 | X | 8 |

| Sheet C | 1 | 2 | 3 | 4 | 5 | 6 | 7 | 8 | 9 | 10 | 11 | Final |
|---|---|---|---|---|---|---|---|---|---|---|---|---|
| China (Wang) | 0 | 2 | 1 | 0 | 0 | 1 | 0 | 2 | 0 | 0 | 0 | 6 |
| Olympic Athletes from Russia (Moiseeva) | 1 | 0 | 0 | 2 | 0 | 0 | 1 | 0 | 0 | 2 | 1 | 7 |

| Sheet D | 1 | 2 | 3 | 4 | 5 | 6 | 7 | 8 | 9 | 10 | Final |
|---|---|---|---|---|---|---|---|---|---|---|---|
| Great Britain (Muirhead) | 1 | 0 | 0 | 2 | 0 | 0 | 0 | 1 | 0 | 0 | 4 |
| United States (Roth) | 0 | 0 | 2 | 0 | 0 | 2 | 0 | 0 | 1 | 2 | 7 |

=== Draw 3 ===
Thursday, 15 February, 20:05

| Sheet A | 1 | 2 | 3 | 4 | 5 | 6 | 7 | 8 | 9 | 10 | 11 | Final |
|---|---|---|---|---|---|---|---|---|---|---|---|---|
| China (Wang) | 0 | 1 | 0 | 3 | 0 | 1 | 0 | 1 | 0 | 1 | 0 | 7 |
| Great Britain (Muirhead) | 1 | 0 | 1 | 0 | 1 | 0 | 2 | 0 | 2 | 0 | 1 | 8 |

| Sheet B | 1 | 2 | 3 | 4 | 5 | 6 | 7 | 8 | 9 | 10 | 11 | Final |
|---|---|---|---|---|---|---|---|---|---|---|---|---|
| Canada (Homan) | 0 | 0 | 2 | 0 | 1 | 0 | 1 | 1 | 0 | 1 | 0 | 6 |
| Sweden (Hasselborg) | 2 | 0 | 0 | 1 | 0 | 2 | 0 | 0 | 1 | 0 | 1 | 7 |

| Sheet C | 1 | 2 | 3 | 4 | 5 | 6 | 7 | 8 | 9 | 10 | Final |
|---|---|---|---|---|---|---|---|---|---|---|---|
| United States (Roth) | 0 | 0 | 1 | 0 | 0 | 2 | 0 | 1 | 0 | 1 | 5 |
| Switzerland (Tirinzoni) | 0 | 2 | 0 | 1 | 2 | 0 | 0 | 0 | 1 | 0 | 6 |

| Sheet D | 1 | 2 | 3 | 4 | 5 | 6 | 7 | 8 | 9 | 10 | Final |
|---|---|---|---|---|---|---|---|---|---|---|---|
| South Korea (Kim) | 0 | 2 | 0 | 1 | 0 | 1 | 1 | 0 | 0 | 0 | 5 |
| Japan (Fujisawa) | 1 | 0 | 1 | 0 | 1 | 0 | 0 | 1 | 2 | 1 | 7 |

=== Draw 4 ===
Friday, 16 February, 14:05

| Sheet A | 1 | 2 | 3 | 4 | 5 | 6 | 7 | 8 | 9 | 10 | 11 | Final |
|---|---|---|---|---|---|---|---|---|---|---|---|---|
| Denmark (Dupont) | 0 | 0 | 3 | 1 | 0 | 2 | 0 | 0 | 0 | 2 | 1 | 9 |
| Canada (Homan) | 0 | 2 | 0 | 0 | 4 | 0 | 1 | 1 | 0 | 0 | 0 | 8 |

| Sheet B | 1 | 2 | 3 | 4 | 5 | 6 | 7 | 8 | 9 | 10 | Final |
|---|---|---|---|---|---|---|---|---|---|---|---|
| South Korea (Kim) | 1 | 0 | 1 | 1 | 1 | 0 | 1 | 0 | 2 | 0 | 7 |
| Switzerland (Tirinzoni) | 0 | 2 | 0 | 0 | 0 | 1 | 0 | 1 | 0 | 1 | 5 |

| Sheet D | 1 | 2 | 3 | 4 | 5 | 6 | 7 | 8 | 9 | 10 | 11 | Final |
|---|---|---|---|---|---|---|---|---|---|---|---|---|
| Sweden (Hasselborg) | 0 | 0 | 0 | 0 | 1 | 0 | 1 | 0 | 2 | 0 | 1 | 5 |
| Olympic Athletes from Russia (Moiseeva) | 0 | 0 | 0 | 1 | 0 | 1 | 0 | 1 | 0 | 1 | 0 | 4 |

=== Draw 5 ===
Saturday, 17 February, 09:05

| Sheet A | 1 | 2 | 3 | 4 | 5 | 6 | 7 | 8 | 9 | 10 | Final |
|---|---|---|---|---|---|---|---|---|---|---|---|
| Switzerland (Tirinzoni) | 0 | 2 | 2 | 0 | 0 | 0 | 0 | 0 | 1 | 2 | 7 |
| Sweden (Hasselborg) | 1 | 0 | 0 | 1 | 0 | 1 | 3 | 2 | 0 | 0 | 8 |

| Sheet B | 1 | 2 | 3 | 4 | 5 | 6 | 7 | 8 | 9 | 10 | 11 | Final |
|---|---|---|---|---|---|---|---|---|---|---|---|---|
| Olympic Athletes from Russia (Moiseeva) | 0 | 2 | 0 | 0 | 1 | 1 | 0 | 1 | 0 | 1 | 0 | 6 |
| United States (Roth) | 1 | 0 | 2 | 1 | 0 | 0 | 1 | 0 | 1 | 0 | 1 | 7 |

| Sheet C | 1 | 2 | 3 | 4 | 5 | 6 | 7 | 8 | 9 | 10 | 11 | Final |
|---|---|---|---|---|---|---|---|---|---|---|---|---|
| Japan (Fujisawa) | 2 | 1 | 0 | 1 | 0 | 1 | 0 | 0 | 0 | 1 | 0 | 6 |
| China (Wang) | 0 | 0 | 2 | 0 | 1 | 0 | 0 | 3 | 0 | 0 | 1 | 7 |

| Sheet D | 1 | 2 | 3 | 4 | 5 | 6 | 7 | 8 | 9 | 10 | Final |
|---|---|---|---|---|---|---|---|---|---|---|---|
| Denmark (Dupont) | 1 | 0 | 1 | 0 | 1 | 0 | 1 | 0 | 1 | 1 | 6 |
| Great Britain (Muirhead) | 0 | 2 | 0 | 1 | 0 | 2 | 0 | 2 | 0 | 0 | 7 |

=== Draw 6 ===
Saturday, 17 February, 20:05

| Sheet A | 1 | 2 | 3 | 4 | 5 | 6 | 7 | 8 | 9 | 10 | Final |
|---|---|---|---|---|---|---|---|---|---|---|---|
| Olympic Athletes from Russia (Moiseeva) | 1 | 0 | 2 | 0 | 1 | 0 | 0 | 1 | 0 | X | 5 |
| Japan (Fujisawa) | 0 | 2 | 0 | 2 | 0 | 1 | 3 | 0 | 2 | X | 10 |

| Sheet B | 1 | 2 | 3 | 4 | 5 | 6 | 7 | 8 | 9 | 10 | Final |
|---|---|---|---|---|---|---|---|---|---|---|---|
| China (Wang) | 4 | 0 | 0 | 1 | 0 | 0 | 1 | 0 | 4 | X | 10 |
| Denmark (Dupont) | 0 | 1 | 3 | 0 | 2 | 0 | 0 | 1 | 0 | X | 7 |

| Sheet C | 1 | 2 | 3 | 4 | 5 | 6 | 7 | 8 | 9 | 10 | Final |
|---|---|---|---|---|---|---|---|---|---|---|---|
| South Korea (Kim) | 0 | 0 | 0 | 1 | 1 | 0 | 0 | 2 | 2 | 1 | 7 |
| Great Britain (Muirhead) | 0 | 0 | 1 | 0 | 0 | 1 | 2 | 0 | 0 | 0 | 4 |

| Sheet D | 1 | 2 | 3 | 4 | 5 | 6 | 7 | 8 | 9 | 10 | Final |
|---|---|---|---|---|---|---|---|---|---|---|---|
| United States (Roth) | 0 | 1 | 0 | 1 | 0 | 1 | 0 | X | X | X | 3 |
| Canada (Homan) | 3 | 0 | 1 | 0 | 3 | 0 | 4 | X | X | X | 11 |

=== Draw 7 ===
Sunday, 18 February, 14:05

| Sheet B | 1 | 2 | 3 | 4 | 5 | 6 | 7 | 8 | 9 | 10 | 11 | Final |
|---|---|---|---|---|---|---|---|---|---|---|---|---|
| Great Britain (Muirhead) | 0 | 0 | 0 | 2 | 1 | 0 | 0 | 1 | 0 | 2 | 0 | 6 |
| Sweden (Hasselborg) | 0 | 2 | 1 | 0 | 0 | 1 | 0 | 0 | 2 | 0 | 2 | 8 |

| Sheet C | 1 | 2 | 3 | 4 | 5 | 6 | 7 | 8 | 9 | 10 | Final |
|---|---|---|---|---|---|---|---|---|---|---|---|
| Canada (Homan) | 0 | 0 | 2 | 0 | 2 | 0 | 2 | 0 | 3 | 1 | 10 |
| Switzerland (Tirinzoni) | 1 | 0 | 0 | 3 | 0 | 3 | 0 | 1 | 0 | 0 | 8 |

| Sheet D | 1 | 2 | 3 | 4 | 5 | 6 | 7 | 8 | 9 | 10 | Final |
|---|---|---|---|---|---|---|---|---|---|---|---|
| China (Wang) | 0 | 1 | 0 | 1 | 0 | 2 | 1 | 0 | X | X | 5 |
| South Korea (Kim) | 3 | 0 | 3 | 0 | 4 | 0 | 0 | 2 | X | X | 12 |

=== Draw 8 ===
Monday, 19 February, 09:05

| Sheet A | 1 | 2 | 3 | 4 | 5 | 6 | 7 | 8 | 9 | 10 | Final |
|---|---|---|---|---|---|---|---|---|---|---|---|
| United States (Roth) | 1 | 0 | 1 | 1 | 0 | 2 | 0 | 1 | 0 | 1 | 7 |
| Denmark (Dupont) | 0 | 1 | 0 | 0 | 2 | 0 | 2 | 0 | 1 | 0 | 6 |

| Sheet B | 1 | 2 | 3 | 4 | 5 | 6 | 7 | 8 | 9 | 10 | Final |
|---|---|---|---|---|---|---|---|---|---|---|---|
| Japan (Fujisawa) | 0 | 1 | 0 | 0 | 0 | 2 | 0 | X | X | X | 3 |
| Canada (Homan) | 1 | 0 | 0 | 1 | 4 | 0 | 2 | X | X | X | 8 |

| Sheet C | 1 | 2 | 3 | 4 | 5 | 6 | 7 | 8 | 9 | 10 | Final |
|---|---|---|---|---|---|---|---|---|---|---|---|
| Sweden (Hasselborg) | 1 | 0 | 0 | 0 | 1 | 0 | 1 | 0 | 2 | 1 | 6 |
| South Korea (Kim) | 0 | 1 | 0 | 2 | 0 | 2 | 0 | 2 | 0 | 0 | 7 |

| Sheet D | 1 | 2 | 3 | 4 | 5 | 6 | 7 | 8 | 9 | 10 | Final |
|---|---|---|---|---|---|---|---|---|---|---|---|
| Olympic Athletes from Russia (Moiseeva) | 0 | 1 | 0 | 0 | 0 | 1 | 0 | X | X | X | 2 |
| Switzerland (Tirinzoni) | 0 | 0 | 3 | 2 | 2 | 0 | 4 | X | X | X | 11 |

=== Draw 9 ===
Monday, 19 February, 20:05

| Sheet A | 1 | 2 | 3 | 4 | 5 | 6 | 7 | 8 | 9 | 10 | Final |
|---|---|---|---|---|---|---|---|---|---|---|---|
| Great Britain (Muirhead) | 2 | 0 | 0 | 1 | 0 | 2 | 0 | 1 | 0 | 2 | 8 |
| Switzerland (Tirinzoni) | 0 | 0 | 2 | 0 | 1 | 0 | 2 | 0 | 2 | 0 | 7 |

| Sheet B | 1 | 2 | 3 | 4 | 5 | 6 | 7 | 8 | 9 | 10 | Final |
|---|---|---|---|---|---|---|---|---|---|---|---|
| Denmark (Dupont) | 0 | 0 | 0 | 2 | 0 | 2 | 0 | 0 | 3 | 0 | 7 |
| Olympic Athletes from Russia (Moiseeva) | 0 | 1 | 1 | 0 | 3 | 0 | 1 | 1 | 0 | 1 | 8 |

| Sheet C | 1 | 2 | 3 | 4 | 5 | 6 | 7 | 8 | 9 | 10 | Final |
|---|---|---|---|---|---|---|---|---|---|---|---|
| China (Wang) | 0 | 1 | 0 | 2 | 0 | 0 | 0 | 1 | X | X | 4 |
| United States (Roth) | 3 | 0 | 4 | 0 | 2 | 0 | 1 | 0 | X | X | 10 |

| Sheet D | 1 | 2 | 3 | 4 | 5 | 6 | 7 | 8 | 9 | 10 | Final |
|---|---|---|---|---|---|---|---|---|---|---|---|
| Japan (Fujisawa) | 0 | 1 | 0 | 0 | 1 | 0 | 0 | 0 | 2 | 1 | 5 |
| Sweden (Hasselborg) | 0 | 0 | 1 | 1 | 0 | 1 | 0 | 1 | 0 | 0 | 4 |

=== Draw 10 ===
Tuesday, 20 February, 14:05

| Sheet A | 1 | 2 | 3 | 4 | 5 | 6 | 7 | 8 | 9 | 10 | Final |
|---|---|---|---|---|---|---|---|---|---|---|---|
| Canada (Homan) | 0 | 0 | 1 | 2 | 0 | 1 | 0 | 0 | 1 | 0 | 5 |
| China (Wang) | 0 | 2 | 0 | 0 | 3 | 0 | 0 | 1 | 0 | 1 | 7 |

| Sheet B | 1 | 2 | 3 | 4 | 5 | 6 | 7 | 8 | 9 | 10 | Final |
|---|---|---|---|---|---|---|---|---|---|---|---|
| United States (Roth) | 2 | 0 | 1 | 0 | 0 | 1 | 0 | 2 | 0 | X | 6 |
| South Korea (Kim) | 0 | 1 | 0 | 1 | 4 | 0 | 1 | 0 | 2 | X | 9 |

| Sheet C | 1 | 2 | 3 | 4 | 5 | 6 | 7 | 8 | 9 | 10 | Final |
|---|---|---|---|---|---|---|---|---|---|---|---|
| Great Britain (Muirhead) | 1 | 0 | 1 | 1 | 0 | 3 | 0 | 1 | 1 | 0 | 8 |
| Japan (Fujisawa) | 0 | 3 | 0 | 0 | 0 | 0 | 2 | 0 | 0 | 1 | 6 |

=== Draw 11 ===
Wednesday, 21 February, 09:05

| Sheet A | 1 | 2 | 3 | 4 | 5 | 6 | 7 | 8 | 9 | 10 | Final |
|---|---|---|---|---|---|---|---|---|---|---|---|
| South Korea (Kim) | 3 | 3 | 3 | 0 | 2 | 0 | X | X | X | X | 11 |
| Olympic Athletes from Russia (Moiseeva) | 0 | 0 | 0 | 1 | 0 | 1 | X | X | X | X | 2 |

| Sheet B | 1 | 2 | 3 | 4 | 5 | 6 | 7 | 8 | 9 | 10 | Final |
|---|---|---|---|---|---|---|---|---|---|---|---|
| Sweden (Hasselborg) | 0 | 2 | 1 | 0 | 2 | 0 | 0 | 3 | 0 | X | 8 |
| China (Wang) | 0 | 0 | 0 | 1 | 0 | 2 | 0 | 0 | 1 | X | 4 |

| Sheet C | 1 | 2 | 3 | 4 | 5 | 6 | 7 | 8 | 9 | 10 | Final |
|---|---|---|---|---|---|---|---|---|---|---|---|
| Switzerland (Tirinzoni) | 1 | 0 | 0 | 0 | 3 | 0 | 1 | 0 | 1 | X | 6 |
| Denmark (Dupont) | 0 | 0 | 0 | 2 | 0 | 1 | 0 | 1 | 0 | X | 4 |

| Sheet D | 1 | 2 | 3 | 4 | 5 | 6 | 7 | 8 | 9 | 10 | Final |
|---|---|---|---|---|---|---|---|---|---|---|---|
| Canada (Homan) | 0 | 2 | 1 | 0 | 0 | 1 | 0 | 0 | 1 | 0 | 5 |
| Great Britain (Muirhead) | 1 | 0 | 0 | 1 | 0 | 0 | 0 | 2 | 0 | 2 | 6 |

=== Draw 12 ===
Wednesday, 21 February, 20:05

| Sheet A | 1 | 2 | 3 | 4 | 5 | 6 | 7 | 8 | 9 | 10 | Final |
|---|---|---|---|---|---|---|---|---|---|---|---|
| Sweden (Hasselborg) | 3 | 0 | 1 | 0 | 1 | 0 | 0 | 1 | 0 | 3 | 9 |
| United States (Roth) | 0 | 2 | 0 | 1 | 0 | 0 | 2 | 0 | 1 | 0 | 6 |

| Sheet B | 1 | 2 | 3 | 4 | 5 | 6 | 7 | 8 | 9 | 10 | Final |
|---|---|---|---|---|---|---|---|---|---|---|---|
| Switzerland (Tirinzoni) | 0 | 2 | 0 | 4 | 0 | 0 | 0 | 1 | 1 | X | 8 |
| Japan (Fujisawa) | 0 | 0 | 1 | 0 | 2 | 0 | 1 | 0 | 0 | X | 4 |

| Sheet C | 1 | 2 | 3 | 4 | 5 | 6 | 7 | 8 | 9 | 10 | Final |
|---|---|---|---|---|---|---|---|---|---|---|---|
| Olympic Athletes from Russia (Moiseeva) | 4 | 0 | 1 | 0 | 0 | 0 | 2 | 1 | 0 | 0 | 8 |
| Canada (Homan) | 0 | 2 | 0 | 2 | 1 | 1 | 0 | 0 | 2 | 1 | 9 |

| Sheet D | 1 | 2 | 3 | 4 | 5 | 6 | 7 | 8 | 9 | 10 | Final |
|---|---|---|---|---|---|---|---|---|---|---|---|
| South Korea (Kim) | 0 | 1 | 0 | 3 | 2 | 0 | 3 | X | X | X | 9 |
| Denmark (Dupont) | 0 | 0 | 2 | 0 | 0 | 1 | 0 | X | X | X | 3 |

== Playoffs ==
Semifinals
1 | South Korea | 8
4 | Japan | 7
2 | Sweden | 10
3 | Great Britain | 5

Gold medal game
1 | South Korea | 3
2 | Sweden | 8
Bronze medal game
3 | Great Britain | 3
4 | Japan | 5

=== Semifinals ===
Friday, 23 February, 20:05

| Sheet A | 1 | 2 | 3 | 4 | 5 | 6 | 7 | 8 | 9 | 10 | 11 | Final |
|---|---|---|---|---|---|---|---|---|---|---|---|---|
| South Korea (Kim) | 3 | 0 | 1 | 0 | 2 | 0 | 0 | 1 | 0 | 0 | 1 | 8 |
| Japan (Fujisawa) | 0 | 2 | 0 | 1 | 0 | 1 | 0 | 0 | 2 | 1 | 0 | 7 |

Player percentages
| South Korea | | Japan | |
|---|---|---|---|
| Kim Yeong-mi | 88% | Yurika Yoshida | 91% |
| Kim Seon-yeong | 95% | Yumi Suzuki | 65% |
| Kim Kyeong-ae | 86% | Chinami Yoshida | 82% |
| Kim Eun-jung | 82% | Satsuki Fujisawa | 86% |
| Total | 88% | Total | 81% |

| Sheet C | 1 | 2 | 3 | 4 | 5 | 6 | 7 | 8 | 9 | 10 | Final |
|---|---|---|---|---|---|---|---|---|---|---|---|
| Sweden (Hasselborg) | 0 | 2 | 0 | 1 | 0 | 2 | 3 | 0 | 2 | X | 10 |
| Great Britain (Muirhead) | 0 | 0 | 1 | 0 | 2 | 0 | 0 | 2 | 0 | X | 5 |

Player percentages
| Sweden | | Great Britain | |
|---|---|---|---|
| Sofia Mabergs | 99% | Lauren Gray | 88% |
| Agnes Knochenhauer | 82% | Vicki Adams | 81% |
| Sara McManus | 81% | Anna Sloan | 74% |
| Anna Hasselborg | 83% | Eve Muirhead | 69% |
| Total | 86% | Total | 78% |

=== Bronze medal game ===
Saturday, 24 February, 20:05

| Sheet B | 1 | 2 | 3 | 4 | 5 | 6 | 7 | 8 | 9 | 10 | Final |
|---|---|---|---|---|---|---|---|---|---|---|---|
| Great Britain (Muirhead) | 1 | 0 | 1 | 0 | 1 | 0 | 0 | 0 | 0 | 0 | 3 |
| Japan (Fujisawa) | 0 | 1 | 0 | 1 | 0 | 0 | 0 | 1 | 1 | 1 | 5 |

Player percentages
| Great Britain | | Japan | |
|---|---|---|---|
| Lauren Gray | 89% | Yurika Yoshida | 85% |
| Vicki Adams | 73% | Yumi Suzuki | 69% |
| Anna Sloan | 81% | Chinami Yoshida | 85% |
| Eve Muirhead | 65% | Satsuki Fujisawa | 83% |
| Total | 77% | Total | 80% |

=== Gold medal game ===
Sunday, 25 February, 9:05

| Sheet B | 1 | 2 | 3 | 4 | 5 | 6 | 7 | 8 | 9 | 10 | Final |
|---|---|---|---|---|---|---|---|---|---|---|---|
| South Korea (Kim) | 1 | 0 | 0 | 0 | 0 | 1 | 0 | 1 | 0 | X | 3 |
| Sweden (Hasselborg) | 0 | 0 | 2 | 1 | 1 | 0 | 3 | 0 | 1 | X | 8 |

Player percentages
| South Korea | | Sweden | |
|---|---|---|---|
| Kim Yeong-mi | 82% | Sofia Mabergs | 100% |
| Kim Seon-yeong | 86% | Agnes Knochenhauer | 83% |
| Kim Kyeong-ae | 82% | Sara McManus | 90% |
| Kim Eun-jung | 72% | Anna Hasselborg | 94% |
| Total | 81% | Total | 92% |

== Final standings ==
The final standings are:

| Place | Team |
|---|---|
| 1st place, gold medalist(s) | Sweden |
| 2nd place, silver medalist(s) | South Korea |
| 3rd place, bronze medalist(s) | Japan |
| 4 | Great Britain |
| 5 | China |
| 6 | Canada |
| 7 | Switzerland |
| 8 | United States |
| 9 | Olympic Athletes from Russia |
| 10 | Denmark |

== Statistics ==
=== Player percentages ===
Player percentages during round robin play are as follows:

==== Lead ====
| # | Curler | 1 | 2 | 3 | 4 | 5 | 6 | 7 | 8 | 9 | Total |
|---|---|---|---|---|---|---|---|---|---|---|---|
| 1 | Lisa Weagle (CAN) | 91 | 85 | 76 | 86 | 84 | 100 | 93 | 83 | 81 | 86 |
| 2 | Becca Hamilton (USA) | 89 | 91 | 85 | 82 | 71 | 84 | 94 | 83 | 85 | 85 |
| 3 | Ma Jingyi (CHN) | 86 | 91 | 89 | 83 | 84 | 88 | 75 | 70 | 94 | 84 |
| 4 | Kim Yeong-mi (KOR) | 83 | 79 | 76 | 89 | — | 79 | — | 96 | — | 83 |
| 4 | Julia Guzieva (OAR) | 82 | 76 | 78 | 89 | 85 | 80 | 93 | 77 | 84 | 83 |
| 4 | Sofia Mabergs (SWE) | 80 | 92 | 83 | 82 | 80 | 79 | 78 | 93 | 83 | 83 |
| 7 | Lauren Gray (GBR) | 82 | 86 | 68 | 81 | 83 | 83 | 79 | 85 | 86 | 81 |
| 8 | Marlene Albrecht (SUI) | 80 | 90 | 81 | 74 | 76 | 88 | 69 | 86 | 75 | 80 |
| 9 | Yurika Yoshida (JPN) | 74 | 80 | 79 | 72 | 71 | 86 | 74 | 88 | 82 | 78 |
| 10 | Mathilde Halse (DEN) | 81 | 78 | 81 | 69 | 84 | 66 | 68 | — | — | 74 |

==== Second ====
| # | Curler | 1 | 2 | 3 | 4 | 5 | 6 | 7 | 8 | 9 | Total |
|---|---|---|---|---|---|---|---|---|---|---|---|
| 1 | Agnes Knochenhauer (SWE) | 83 | 83 | 81 | 79 | 86 | 83 | 80 | 94 | 90 | 84 |
| 2 | Galina Arsenkina (OAR) | 82 | 90 | 80 | 77 | 76 | 79 | 80 | 85 | 88 | 82 |
| 3 | Joanne Courtney (CAN) | 84 | 74 | 80 | 93 | 58 | 82 | 83 | 91 | 78 | 80 |
| 4 | Vicki Adams (GBR) | 80 | 75 | 76 | 78 | 91 | 73 | 69 | 76 | 94 | 79 |
| 5 | Manuela Siegrist (SUI) | 59 | 85 | 79 | 65 | 90 | 80 | 75 | 83 | 83 | 78 |
| 6 | Kim Seon-yeong (KOR) | 84 | 64 | 79 | 81 | 86 | 75 | 73 | 85 | 71 | 77 |
| 6 | Aileen Geving (USA) | 67 | 79 | 79 | 77 | 79 | 75 | 91 | 78 | 71 | 77 |
| 8 | Liu Jinli (CHN) | 84 | 75 | 74 | 75 | 75 | 70 | 69 | 80 | 85 | 76 |
| 9 | Julie Høgh (DEN) | 83 | 63 | 74 | 78 | 81 | 64 | 76 | — | — | 74 |
| 9 | Yumi Suzuki (JPN) | 74 | 71 | 74 | 80 | 78 | 64 | 74 | 80 | 72 | 74 |

==== Third ====
| # | Curler | 1 | 2 | 3 | 4 | 5 | 6 | 7 | 8 | 9 | Total |
|---|---|---|---|---|---|---|---|---|---|---|---|
| 1 | Sara McManus (SWE) | 88 | 77 | 82 | 78 | 98 | 75 | 91 | 88 | 80 | 84 |
| 2 | Emma Miskew (CAN) | 90 | 73 | 77 | 98 | 85 | 84 | 76 | 84 | 76 | 82 |
| 3 | Esther Neuenschwander (SUI) | 77 | 93 | 78 | 68 | 85 | 82 | 65 | 89 | 89 | 80 |
| 4 | Tabitha Peterson (USA) | 51 | 80 | 89 | 84 | 68 | 83 | 86 | 69 | 81 | 77 |
| 5 | Kim Kyeong-ae (KOR) | 66 | 64 | 79 | 88 | 80 | 71 | 68 | 90 | 88 | 76 |
| 5 | Anna Sloan (GBR) | 79 | 73 | 70 | 84 | 66 | 74 | 80 | 84 | 75 | 76 |
| 5 | Chinami Yoshida (JPN) | 86 | 65 | 88 | 75 | 86 | 55 | 80 | 75 | 72 | 76 |
| 5 | Zhou Yan (CHN) | 78 | 86 | 73 | 77 | 70 | 63 | 61 | 89 | 83 | 76 |
| 9 | Denise Dupont (DEN) | 73 | 68 | 69 | 74 | 89 | 74 | 78 | 78 | 66 | 75 |
| 10 | Uliana Vasileva (OAR) | 68 | 72 | 69 | 83 | 68 | 52 | — | — | — | 70 |

==== Fourth ====
| # | Curler | 1 | 2 | 3 | 4 | 5 | 6 | 7 | 8 | 9 | Total |
|---|---|---|---|---|---|---|---|---|---|---|---|
| 1 | Anna Hasselborg (SWE) | 92 | 81 | 76 | 83 | 89 | 66 | 71 | 95 | 84 | 82 |
| 2 | Kim Eun-jung (KOR) | 76 | 60 | 80 | 85 | 86 | 63 | 85 | 98 | 80 | 78 |
| 2 | Eve Muirhead (GBR) | 79 | 76 | 74 | 85 | 72 | 81 | 88 | 69 | 83 | 78 |
| 4 | Rachel Homan (CAN) | 72 | 77 | 66 | 96 | 83 | 77 | 73 | 79 | 78 | 77 |
| 5 | Nina Roth (USA) | 49 | 88 | 71 | 81 | 71 | 75 | 86 | 79 | 70 | 75 |
| 6 | Satsuki Fujisawa (JPN) | 68 | 76 | 76 | 80 | 92 | 71 | 61 | 55 | 74 | 73 |
| 6 | Silvana Tirinzoni (SUI) | 56 | 79 | 54 | 78 | 73 | 82 | 81 | 84 | 68 | 73 |
| 6 | Wang Bingyu (CHN) | 80 | 81 | 72 | 70 | 75 | 67 | 58 | 72 | 78 | 73 |
| 9 | Victoria Moiseeva (OAR) | 50 | 82 | 78 | 74 | 76 | 43 | 80 | 58 | 69 | 70 |
| 10 | Madeleine Dupont (DEN) | 55 | 57 | 67 | 73 | 61 | 76 | 66 | 82 | 71 | 68 |
