= Curling at the 2018 Winter Olympics – Men's tournament =

Men's curling at the XXIII Olympic Winter Games
- Venue: Gangneung Curling Centre, Pyeongchang, South Korea
- Dates: 14–24 February
- Competitors: 50 from 10 nations

Medalists
1st place, gold medalist(s)		John Shuster; Tyler George; Matt Hamilton; John Landsteiner; Joe Polo	United States
2nd place, silver medalist(s)		Niklas Edin; Oskar Eriksson; Rasmus Wranå; Christoffer Sundgren; Henrik Leek	Sweden
3rd place, bronze medalist(s)		Benoît Schwarz; Claudio Pätz; Peter de Cruz; Valentin Tanner; Dominik Märki	Switzerland

The men's curling tournament of the 2018 Winter Olympics was held between 14 and 24 February 2018 at the Gangneung Curling Centre. Ten nations competed in a round robin preliminary round, and the top four nations at the conclusion of the round robin qualified for the medal round.

Great Britain, Switzerland, and the United States each finished round robin play with a 5–4 record, resulting in a three-way tie for third place in the preliminary round standings. Under Olympic tiebreaker rules then in effect, the United States was awarded the third seed in the medal round (by virtue of having defeated both Great Britain and Switzerland during the preliminary round), and Great Britain and Switzerland played a one-game tiebreaker. Switzerland prevailed 9-5 and was awarded the fourth seed.

In the gold medal match, with the score tied at 5 in the eighth end, US skip John Shuster fired a dramatic double take-out for five that left his team leading 10-5 with two ends to go, effectively sealing the win and the gold medal for the United States, which won its first gold medal in curling.

== Teams ==
Ten teams took part in the tournament:

Canada	Denmark	Great Britain	Italy	Japan
The Glencoe Club, Calgary: Skip: Kevin Koe; Third: Marc Kennedy; Second: Brent Laing; Lead: Ben Hebert; Alternate: Scott Pfeifer	Hvidovre CC, Hvidovre: Skip: Rasmus Stjerne; Third: Johnny Frederiksen; Second: Mikkel Poulsen; Lead: Oliver Dupont; Alternate: Morten Berg Thomsen	Royal Caledonian CC, Stirling: Skip: Kyle Smith; Third: Thomas Muirhead; Second: Kyle Waddell; Lead: Cammy Smith; Alternate: Glen Muirhead	A.S.D. Trentino Curling, Cembra: Fourth: Amos Mosaner; Skip: Joël Retornaz; Second: Simone Gonin; Lead: Daniele Ferrazza; Alternate: Andrea Pilzer	SC Karuizawa Club, Karuizawa: Skip: Yusuke Morozumi; Third: Tetsuro Shimizu; Second: Tsuyoshi Yamaguchi; Lead: Kosuke Morozumi; Alternate: Kohsuke Hirata
Norway	South Korea	Sweden	Switzerland	United States
Snarøen CC, Oslo: Skip: Thomas Ulsrud; Third: Torger Nergård; Second: Christoffer Svae; Lead: Håvard Vad Petersson; Alternate: Markus Høiberg	GyeongBuk Uiseong CC, Uiseong: Skip: Kim Chang-min; Third: Seong Se-hyeon; Second: Oh Eun-su; Lead: Lee Ki-bok; Alternate: Kim Min-chan	Karlstads CK, Karlstad: Skip: Niklas Edin; Third: Oskar Eriksson; Second: Rasmus Wranå; Lead: Christoffer Sundgren; Alternate: Henrik Leek	CC Genève, Geneva: Fourth: Benoît Schwarz; Third: Claudio Pätz; Skip: Peter de Cruz; Lead: Valentin Tanner; Alternate: Dominik Märki	Duluth CC, Duluth: Skip: John Shuster; Third: Tyler George; Second: Matt Hamilton; Lead: John Landsteiner; Alternate: Joe Polo

== Round-robin standings ==
Final round robin standings
Team	Skip	Pld	W	L	PF	PA	EW	EL	BE	SE	S%	Qualification
Sweden	Niklas Edin	9	7	2	62	43	34	28	13	8	87%	Playoffs
Canada	Kevin Koe	9	6	3	56	46	36	34	14	8	87%	Playoffs
United States	John Shuster	9	5	4	67	63	37	39	4	6	80%	Playoffs
Great Britain	Kyle Smith	9	5	4	55	60	40	37	8	7	82%	Tiebreaker
Switzerland	Peter de Cruz	9	5	4	60	55	39	37	10	6	83%	Tiebreaker
Norway	Thomas Ulsrud	9	4	5	52	56	34	39	7	8	82%	
South Korea	Kim Chang-min	9	4	5	65	63	39	39	8	8	82%	
Japan	Yusuke Morozumi	9	4	5	48	56	33	35	13	5	81%	
Italy	Joël Retornaz	9	3	6	50	56	37	38	15	7	81%	
Denmark	Rasmus Stjerne	9	2	7	53	70	36	39	12	5	83%	

== Round-robin results ==
All draw times are listed in Seoul Time (UTC+9).

=== Summary ===
Team	Canada	Denmark	Great Britain	Italy	Japan	Norway	South Korea	Sweden	Switzerland	United States	Record
Canada		8–3	6–4	5–3	8–4	7–4	7–6	2–5	6–8	7–9	6–3
Denmark	3–8		6–7	6–4	4–6	8–10	9–8	5–9	7–9	5–9	2–7
Great Britain	4–6	7–6		7–6	6–5	10–3	5–11	6–8	6–5	4–10	5–4
Italy	3–5	4–6	6–7		5–6	6–4	6–8	3–7	7–4	10–9	3–6
Japan	4–8	6–4	5–6	6–5		6–4	4-10	4–11	5–6	8–2	4–5
Norway	4–7	10–8	3–10	4–6	4–6		7–5	7–2	5–7	8–5	4–5
South Korea	6–7	8–9	11–5	8–6	10-4	5–7		2–7	8–7	7–11	4–5
Sweden	5–2	9–5	8–6	7–3	11–4	2–7	7–2		3–10	10–4	7–2
Switzerland	8–6	9–7	5–6	4–7	6–5	7–5	7–8	10–3		4–8	5–4
United States	9–7	9–5	10–4	9–10	2–8	5–8	11–7	4–10	8–4		5–4

=== Draw 1 ===
Wednesday, 14 February, 09:05

Sheet A	1	2	3	4	5	6	7	8	9	10	Final
Denmark (Stjerne)	0	0	0	2	0	0	1	0	2	0	5
Sweden (Edin)	0	2	0	0	3	2	0	1	0	1	9

Sheet B	1	2	3	4	5	6	7	8	9	10	Final
Canada (Koe)	0	0	0	0	1	1	0	2	0	1	5
Italy (Retornaz)	0	0	0	1	0	0	1	0	1	0	3

Sheet C	1	2	3	4	5	6	7	8	9	10	Final
South Korea (Kim)	0	2	0	1	0	3	0	1	0	X	7
United States (Shuster)	2	0	3	0	3	0	2	0	1	X	11

Sheet D	1	2	3	4	5	6	7	8	9	10	11	Final
Switzerland (de Cruz)	0	0	0	1	0	2	0	1	0	1	0	5
Great Britain (Smith)	0	0	1	0	1	0	1	0	2	0	1	6

=== Draw 2 ===
Wednesday, 14 February, 20:05

Sheet A	1	2	3	4	5	6	7	8	9	10	Final
Canada (Koe)	2	0	2	0	0	0	1	0	0	1	6
Great Britain (Smith)	0	1	0	0	1	1	0	1	0	0	4

Sheet B	1	2	3	4	5	6	7	8	9	10	Final
South Korea (Kim)	0	0	0	1	0	0	1	0	0	X	2
Sweden (Edin)	0	2	0	0	2	1	0	1	1	X	7

Sheet C	1	2	3	4	5	6	7	8	9	10	Final
Switzerland (de Cruz)	0	0	1	0	0	0	1	0	2	0	4
Italy (Retornaz)	1	1	0	1	0	1	0	1	0	2	7

Sheet D	1	2	3	4	5	6	7	8	9	10	Final
Norway (Ulsrud)	1	0	0	0	1	1	0	1	0	X	4
Japan (Morozumi)	0	1	1	1	0	0	2	0	1	X	6

=== Draw 3 ===
Thursday, 15 February, 14:05

Sheet A	1	2	3	4	5	6	7	8	9	10	Final
United States (Shuster)	0	1	0	3	2	0	0	2	1	0	9
Italy (Retornaz)	1	0	5	0	0	3	0	0	0	1	10

Sheet B	1	2	3	4	5	6	7	8	9	10	Final
Norway (Ulsrud)	0	1	1	0	0	2	0	0	0	X	4
Canada (Koe)	2	0	0	0	1	0	1	1	2	X	7

Sheet C	1	2	3	4	5	6	7	8	9	10	Final
Great Britain (Smith)	1	0	2	0	0	1	0	1	0	1	6
Japan (Morozumi)	0	1	0	0	1	0	2	0	1	0	5

Sheet D	1	2	3	4	5	6	7	8	9	10	Final
Denmark (Stjerne)	0	0	2	0	1	1	0	2	0	1	7
Switzerland (de Cruz)	1	1	0	3	0	0	2	0	2	0	9

=== Draw 4 ===
Friday, 16 February, 09:05

Sheet B	1	2	3	4	5	6	7	8	9	10	Final
Italy (Retornaz)	0	1	0	0	1	1	0	0	0	1	4
Denmark (Stjerne)	2	0	2	0	0	0	0	0	2	0	6

Sheet C	1	2	3	4	5	6	7	8	9	10	Final
Norway (Ulsrud)	0	2	0	0	2	0	0	2	0	1	7
South Korea (Kim)	1	0	0	1	0	1	0	0	2	0	5

Sheet D	1	2	3	4	5	6	7	8	9	10	Final
Sweden (Edin)	4	1	0	2	0	1	0	2	X	X	10
United States (Shuster)	0	0	1	0	1	0	2	0	X	X	4

=== Draw 5 ===
Friday, 16 February, 20:05

Sheet A	1	2	3	4	5	6	7	8	9	10	Final
Japan (Morozumi)	0	2	0	1	0	0	0	2	0	0	5
Switzerland (de Cruz)	3	0	1	0	0	1	0	0	0	1	6

Sheet B	1	2	3	4	5	6	7	8	9	10	Final
Sweden (Edin)	1	0	0	2	0	3	0	0	2	X	8
Great Britain (Smith)	0	2	1	0	2	0	0	1	0	X	6

Sheet C	1	2	3	4	5	6	7	8	9	10	Final
Denmark (Stjerne)	0	0	0	0	2	1	0	2	0	X	5
United States (Shuster)	2	2	0	2	0	0	2	0	1	X	9

Sheet D	1	2	3	4	5	6	7	8	9	10	Final
Canada (Koe)	0	0	3	0	1	0	2	1	0	0	7
South Korea (Kim)	0	1	0	1	0	1	0	0	2	1	6

=== Draw 6 ===
Saturday, 17 February, 14:05

Sheet A	1	2	3	4	5	6	7	8	9	10	Final
South Korea (Kim)	0	2	1	0	2	2	0	3	1	X	11
Great Britain (Smith)	2	0	0	1	0	0	2	0	0	X	5

Sheet B	1	2	3	4	5	6	7	8	9	10	Final
Switzerland (de Cruz)	1	0	0	1	0	0	2	0	2	1	7
Norway (Ulsrud)	0	1	1	0	0	2	0	1	0	0	5

Sheet C	1	2	3	4	5	6	7	8	9	10	Final
Canada (Koe)	0	2	0	0	0	0	0	0	0	X	2
Sweden (Edin)	0	0	0	0	2	2	0	1	0	X	5

Sheet D	1	2	3	4	5	6	7	8	9	10	Final
Japan (Morozumi)	2	0	1	0	2	0	0	0	0	1	6
Italy (Retornaz)	0	1	0	2	0	0	0	1	1	0	5

=== Draw 7 ===
Sunday, 18 February, 09:05

Sheet A	1	2	3	4	5	6	7	8	9	10	Final
Norway (Ulsrud)	0	1	0	4	0	4	0	0	1	0	10
Denmark (Stjerne)	1	0	1	0	1	0	2	2	0	1	8

Sheet B	1	2	3	4	5	6	7	8	9	10	Final
United States (Shuster)	0	0	0	0	2	0	0	X	X	X	2
Japan (Morozumi)	2	1	1	0	0	2	2	X	X	X	8

Sheet D	1	2	3	4	5	6	7	8	9	10	Final
Switzerland (de Cruz)	4	0	1	0	2	0	0	0	1	X	8
Canada (Koe)	0	2	0	1	0	2	1	0	0	X	6

=== Draw 8 ===
Sunday, 18 February, 20:05

Sheet A	1	2	3	4	5	6	7	8	9	10	Final
Sweden (Edin)	3	0	2	0	0	1	0	5	X	X	11
Japan (Morozumi)	0	1	0	0	1	0	2	0	X	X	4

Sheet B	1	2	3	4	5	6	7	8	9	10	11	Final
Denmark (Stjerne)	0	0	2	1	2	0	0	3	0	0	1	9
South Korea (Kim)	2	0	0	0	0	2	1	0	1	2	0	8

Sheet C	1	2	3	4	5	6	7	8	9	10	11	Final
Italy (Retornaz)	0	0	1	0	0	2	0	2	0	1	0	6
Great Britain (Smith)	2	0	0	1	0	0	2	0	1	0	1	7

Sheet D	1	2	3	4	5	6	7	8	9	10	Final
United States (Shuster)	1	0	2	0	1	0	0	0	1	X	5
Norway (Ulsrud)	0	2	0	1	0	3	1	1	0	X	8

=== Draw 9 ===
Monday, 19 February, 14:05

Sheet A	1	2	3	4	5	6	7	8	9	10	Final
Italy (Retornaz)	0	1	0	2	0	1	0	1	1	0	6
South Korea (Kim)	3	0	1	0	1	0	2	0	0	1	8

Sheet B	1	2	3	4	5	6	7	8	9	10	Final
Sweden (Edin)	0	0	0	2	0	1	0	X	X	X	3
Switzerland (de Cruz)	2	1	1	0	1	0	5	X	X	X	10

Sheet C	1	2	3	4	5	6	7	8	9	10	11	Final
United States (Shuster)	1	0	2	0	1	1	0	0	2	0	2	9
Canada (Koe)	0	2	0	1	0	0	1	1	0	2	0	7

Sheet D	1	2	3	4	5	6	7	8	9	10	Final
Great Britain (Smith)	0	1	0	1	0	2	0	1	0	2	7
Denmark (Stjerne)	1	0	1	0	2	0	1	0	1	0	6

=== Draw 10 ===
Tuesday, 20 February, 09:05

Sheet A	1	2	3	4	5	6	7	8	9	10	Final
Great Britain (Smith)	3	1	0	2	0	3	1	X	X	X	10
Norway (Ulsrud)	0	0	2	0	1	0	0	X	X	X	3

Sheet B	1	2	3	4	5	6	7	8	9	10	Final
Japan (Morozumi)	0	2	0	0	1	0	1	0	0	X	4
Canada (Koe)	1	0	2	1	0	2	0	1	1	X	8

Sheet C	1	2	3	4	5	6	7	8	9	10	Final
South Korea (Kim)	0	0	4	0	0	1	0	2	0	1	8
Switzerland (de Cruz)	1	0	0	1	3	0	1	0	1	0	7

Sheet D	1	2	3	4	5	6	7	8	9	10	Final
Italy (Retornaz)	0	0	0	1	1	0	0	1	0	X	3
Sweden (Edin)	3	1	1	0	0	1	0	0	1	X	7

=== Draw 11 ===
Tuesday, 20 February, 20:05

Sheet A	1	2	3	4	5	6	7	8	9	10	Final
Switzerland (de Cruz)	0	1	0	1	0	1	0	1	0	X	4
United States (Shuster)	0	0	1	0	3	0	3	0	1	X	8

Sheet B	1	2	3	4	5	6	7	8	9	10	Final
Norway (Ulsrud)	0	0	1	1	0	0	0	1	0	1	4
Italy (Retornaz)	0	1	0	0	0	1	1	0	3	0	6

Sheet C	1	2	3	4	5	6	7	8	9	10	Final
Japan (Morozumi)	0	0	3	0	0	2	0	0	0	1	6
Denmark (Stjerne)	1	0	0	1	0	0	0	2	0	0	4

=== Draw 12 ===
Wednesday, 21 February, 14:05

Sheet A	1	2	3	4	5	6	7	8	9	10	Final
Denmark (Stjerne)	0	1	0	1	0	0	1	X	X	X	3
Canada (Koe)	4	0	1	0	3	0	0	X	X	X	8

Sheet B	1	2	3	4	5	6	7	8	9	10	Final
Great Britain (Smith)	0	1	1	1	0	1	0	0	X	X	4
United States (Shuster)	2	0	0	0	3	0	1	4	X	X	10

Sheet C	1	2	3	4	5	6	7	8	9	10	Final
Sweden (Edin)	0	0	2	0	0	0	X	X	X	X	2
Norway (Ulsrud)	1	0	0	3	2	1	X	X	X	X	7

Sheet D	1	2	3	4	5	6	7	8	9	10	Final
South Korea (Kim)	1	0	2	0	0	4	0	3	X	X	10
Japan (Morozumi)	0	1	0	2	0	0	1	0	X	X	4

== Tiebreaker ==
Thursday, 22 February, 9:05

Sheet D	1	2	3	4	5	6	7	8	9	10	Final
Great Britain (Smith)	2	0	0	2	0	0	0	1	0	X	5
Switzerland (de Cruz)	0	1	0	0	2	1	0	0	5	X	9

Player percentages
Great Britain		Switzerland	
Cameron Smith	85%	Valentin Tanner	89%
Kyle Waddell	89%	Peter de Cruz	86%
Thomas Muirhead	89%	Claudio Pätz	95%
Kyle Smith	82%	Benoît Schwarz	80%
Total	86%	Total	88%

== Playoffs ==
Semifinals
1	Sweden	9
4	Switzerland	3
2	Canada	3
3	United States	5

Gold medal game
1	Sweden	7
3	United States	10
Bronze medal game
2	Canada	5
4	Switzerland	7

=== Semifinals ===
Thursday, 22 February, 20:05

Sheet A	1	2	3	4	5	6	7	8	9	10	Final
Sweden (Edin)	2	0	0	4	0	2	1	0	X	X	9
Switzerland (de Cruz)	0	1	0	0	1	0	0	1	X	X	3

Player percentages
Sweden		Switzerland	
Christoffer Sundgren	94%	Valentin Tanner	86%
Rasmus Wranå	97%	Peter de Cruz	84%
Oskar Eriksson	81%	Claudio Pätz	75%
Niklas Edin	95%	Benoît Schwarz	70%
Total	92%	Total	79%

Sheet C	1	2	3	4	5	6	7	8	9	10	Final
Canada (Koe)	0	1	0	1	0	0	0	0	1	0	3
United States (Shuster)	0	0	1	0	1	0	0	2	0	1	5

Player percentages
Canada		United States	
Ben Hebert	84%	John Landsteiner	86%
Brent Laing	78%	Matt Hamilton	89%
Marc Kennedy	80%	Tyler George	83%
Kevin Koe	85%	John Shuster	91%
Total	82%	Total	87%

=== Bronze medal game ===
Friday, 23 February, 15:35

Sheet B	1	2	3	4	5	6	7	8	9	10	Final
Canada (Koe)	0	0	0	2	0	1	0	2	0	X	5
Switzerland (de Cruz)	0	1	1	0	2	0	2	0	1	X	7

Player percentages
Canada		Switzerland	
Ben Hebert	100%	Valentin Tanner	81%
Brent Laing	75%	Peter de Cruz	84%
Marc Kennedy	75%	Claudio Pätz	91%
Kevin Koe	65%	Benoît Schwarz	88%
Total	79%	Total	86%

=== Gold medal game ===
Saturday, 24 February, 15:35

Sheet B	1	2	3	4	5	6	7	8	9	10	Final
Sweden (Edin)	0	2	0	0	2	0	1	0	2	X	7
United States (Shuster)	0	0	2	1	0	2	0	5	0	X	10

Player percentages
Sweden		United States	
Christoffer Sundgren	96%	John Landsteiner	81%
Rasmus Wranå	84%	Matt Hamilton	74%
Oskar Eriksson	86%	Tyler George	88%
Niklas Edin	74%	John Shuster	76%
Total	85%	Total	80%

== Final standings ==
The final standings are:

Place	Team	Record
1st place, gold medalist(s)	United States	7–4
2nd place, silver medalist(s)	Sweden	8–3
3rd place, bronze medalist(s)	Switzerland	7–5
4	Canada	6–5
5	Great Britain	5–5
6	Norway	4–5
7	South Korea	4–5
8	Japan	4–5
9	Italy	3–6
10	Denmark	2–7

== Statistics ==
=== Player percentages ===
Player percentages during round robin play are as follows:

==== Lead ====
#	Curler	1	2	3	4	5	6	7	8	9	Total
1	Oliver Dupont (DEN)	84	86	89	88	95	93	90	86	93	89
2	Lee Ki-bok (KOR)	98	90	91	84	81	85	88	85	83	87
2	Cammy Smith (GBR)	84	80	86	94	93	89	85	85	91	87
2	Valentin Tanner (SUI)	88	98	82	86	83	84	80	93	85	87
5	Ben Hebert (CAN)	88	91	68	85	91	88	88	88	95	86
5	Christoffer Sundgren (SWE)	85	90	75	93	88	81	86	81	94	86
7	Kosuke Morozumi (JPN)	88	88	83	76	89	75	89	75	88	83
7	John Landsteiner (USA)	82	78	100	72	86	83	75	86	86	83
7	Håvard Vad Petersson (NOR)	81	78	86	74	75	85	89	88	94	83
7	Daniele Ferrazza (ITA)	82	81	80	91	78	88	—	—	—	83

==== Second ====
#	Curler	1	2	3	4	5	6	7	8	9	Total
1	Rasmus Wranå (SWE)	85	92	95	79	89	89	68	97	94	88
2	Brent Laing (CAN)	80	89	81	94	81	86	82	86	95	86
3	Mikkel Poulsen (DEN)	90	64	90	96	80	83	88	90	93	85
3	Tsuyoshi Yamaguchi (JPN)	85	80	85	93	98	84	79	96	66	85
5	Oh Eun-su (KOR)	—	—	93	80	86	78	83	78	92	84
6	Matt Hamilton (USA)	93	76	86	90	82	67	78	71	95	82
7	Christoffer Svae (NOR)	75	85	95	69	90	76	80	81	75	81
7	Peter de Cruz (SUI)	76	79	85	81	79	93	80	78	83	81
7	Kyle Waddell (GBR)	82	80	84	81	81	75	83	89	77	81
10	Simone Gonin (ITA)	85	79	75	85	76	69	84	78	90	80

==== Third ====
#	Curler	1	2	3	4	5	6	7	8	9	Total
1	Oskar Eriksson (SWE)	86	93	95	88	88	91	86	89	86	89
1	Marc Kennedy (CAN)	86	83	89	95	89	96	90	90	83	89
3	Claudio Pätz (SUI)	91	91	88	91	83	74	77	74	85	84
4	Torger Nergård (NOR)	83	86	91	74	93	68	91	76	92	83
4	Seong Se-hyeon (KOR)	83	85	76	84	88	74	83	85	94	83
6	Johnny Frederiksen (DEN)	84	70	88	81	74	92	76	86	80	81
6	Thomas Muirhead (GBR)	80	68	83	81	82	89	74	89	86	81
8	Tetsuro Shimizu (JPN)	88	80	79	80	95	58	76	79	78	79
8	Tyler George (USA)	83	78	72	78	89	74	80	75	86	79
10	Joël Retornaz (ITA)	71	83	73	88	80	81	69	85	78	78

==== Fourth ====
#	Curler	1	2	3	4	5	6	7	8	9	Total
1	Niklas Edin (SWE)	91	96	83	84	99	77	70	86	73	85
1	Kevin Koe (CAN)	86	86	83	88	75	83	83	96	86	85
3	Benoît Schwarz (SUI)	70	78	81	88	80	82	95	90	76	82
4	Amos Mosaner (ITA)	80	94	83	72	72	86	86	58	89	81
5	Thomas Ulsrud (NOR)	78	78	84	83	78	79	64	83	94	80
6	Kyle Smith (GBR)	80	71	84	82	65	72	83	96	72	78
7	Yusuke Morozumi (JPN)	75	84	70	78	91	69	71	89	72	77
7	Kim Chang-min (KOR)	78	69	85	81	79	65	70	86	78	77
7	John Shuster (USA)	82	80	66	82	54	67	82	97	78	77
10	Rasmus Stjerne (DEN)	75	81	79	75	82	76	78	78	48	75
