= Sweden at the 2018 Winter Olympics =

- Flag of Sweden
- IOC code: SWE
- NOC: Swedish Olympic Committee
- Website: www.sok.se (in Swedish)

in Pyeongchang, South Korea 9–25 February 2018
- Competitors: 116 (62 men and 54 women) in 9 sports
- Flag bearer (opening): Niklas Edin
- Flag bearer (closing): Charlotte Kalla
- Medals Ranked 6th: Gold 7 Silver 6 Bronze 1 Total 14

Winter Olympics appearances (overview)
- 1924; 1928; 1932; 1936; 1948; 1952; 1956; 1960; 1964; 1968; 1972; 1976; 1980; 1984; 1988; 1992; 1994; 1998; 2002; 2006; 2010; 2014; 2018; 2022; 2026

Sweden competed at the 2018 Winter Olympics in PyeongChang, South Korea, from 9 to 25 February 2018. The Swedish Olympic Committee (Swedish: Sveriges Olympiska Kommitté, SOK) sent 116 athletes to the Games, 62 men and 54 women, to compete in nine sports. Jennie-Lee Burmansson became the youngest Swedish Winter Olympic participant.

The team was highly successful, winning 7 gold, 6 silver and 1 bronze medal and earning the 6th place in the medal table. The result matched the highest number of Winter Olympic gold medals Sweden won in Torino in 2006 but beat that record by having more silver medals. The overall medal count of 14 was only one short of Sweden's Winter Olympic record, set in Sochi in 2014 with 15 medals.

== Medalists ==
Medal	Name	Sport	Event	Date
Gold	Charlotte Kalla	Cross-country skiing	Women's 15 km skiathlon	10 February
Gold	Stina Nilsson	Cross-country skiing	Women's sprint	13 February
Gold	Hanna Öberg	Biathlon	Women's individual	15 February
Gold	Frida Hansdotter	Alpine skiing	Women's slalom	16 February
Gold	André Myhrer	Alpine skiing	Men's slalom	22 February
Gold	Peppe Femling; Fredrik Lindström; Jesper Nelin; Sebastian Samuelsson	Biathlon	Men's relay	23 February
Gold	Anna Hasselborg; Agnes Knochenhauer; Sofia Mabergs; Sara McManus; Jennie Wåhlin	Curling	Women's tournament	25 February
Silver	Sebastian Samuelsson	Biathlon	Men's pursuit	12 February
Silver	Charlotte Kalla	Cross-country skiing	Women's 10 km freestyle	15 February
Silver	Ebba Andersson; Anna Haag; Charlotte Kalla; Stina Nilsson	Cross-country skiing	Women's 4×5 km relay	17 February
Silver	Charlotte Kalla; Stina Nilsson	Cross-country skiing	Women's team sprint	21 February
Silver	Mona Brorsson; Linn Persson; Anna Magnusson; Hanna Öberg	Biathlon	Women's relay	22 February
Silver	Niklas Edin; Oskar Eriksson; Henrik Leek; Christoffer Sundgren; Rasmus Wranå	Curling	Men's tournament	24 February
Bronze	Stina Nilsson	Cross-country skiing	Women's 30 km classical	25 February

Medals by sport
Sport	1st place, gold medalist(s)	2nd place, silver medalist(s)	3rd place, bronze medalist(s)	Total
Cross-country skiing	2	3	1	6
Biathlon	2	2	0	4
Alpine skiing	2	0	0	2
Curling	1	1	0	2
Total	7	6	1	14

Medals by date
Day	Date	1st place, gold medalist(s)	2nd place, silver medalist(s)	3rd place, bronze medalist(s)	Total
Day 2	10 February	1	0	0	1
Day 3	11 February	0	0	0	0
Day 4	12 February	0	1	0	1
Day 5	13 February	1	0	0	1
Day 6	14 February	0	0	0	0
Day 7	15 February	1	1	0	2
Day 8	16 February	1	0	0	1
Day 9	17 February	0	1	0	1
Day 10	18 February	0	0	0	0
Day 11	19 February	0	0	0	0
Day 12	20 February	0	0	0	0
Day 13	21 February	0	1	0	1
Day 14	22 February	1	1	0	2
Day 15	23 February	1	0	0	1
Day 16	24 February	0	1	0	1
Day 17	25 February	1	0	1	2
Total		7	6	1	14

Medals by gender
Gender	1st place, gold medalist(s)	2nd place, silver medalist(s)	3rd place, bronze medalist(s)	Total
Male	2	2	0	4
Female	5	4	1	10
Total	7	6	1	14

== Competitors ==
The following is the list of number of competitors participating at the Games per sport/discipline.

Sport	Men	Women	Total
Alpine skiing	4	6	10
Biathlon	5	5	10
Cross-country skiing	10	10	20
Curling	5	5	10
Figure skating	0	1	1
Freestyle skiing	10	4	14
Ice hockey	25	23	48
Snowboarding	2	0	2
Speed skating	1	0	1
Total	62	54	116

Sweden also obtained a quota place in men's short track speed skating, but the Swedish Olympic Committee declined to send any athlete.

== Alpine skiing ==
Men

Athlete	Event	Run 1		Run 2		Total	
Athlete	Event	Time	Rank	Time	Rank	Time	Rank
Mattias Hargin	Slalom	49.71	20	51.51	18	1:41.22	19
Kristoffer Jakobsen	Giant slalom	1:12.02	32	DNS		DNF	
Kristoffer Jakobsen	Slalom	48.74	10	51.20	12	1:39.94	7
André Myhrer	Giant slalom	1:09.60	11	1:12.09	28	2:21.69	23
André Myhrer	Slalom	47.93	2	51.06	8	1:38.99	1st place, gold medalist(s)
Matts Olsson	Giant slalom	1:09.31	7	1:11.39	27	2:20.70	10

Women

Athlete	Event	Run 1		Run 2		Total	
Athlete	Event	Time	Rank	Time	Rank	Time	Rank
Estelle Alphand	Giant slalom	1:14.23	26	1:08.99	1	2:23.22	16
Estelle Alphand	Slalom	51.34	16	DNF			
Frida Hansdotter	Giant slalom	1:11.32	7	1:09.73	11	2:21.05	6
Frida Hansdotter	Slalom	49.09	2	49.54	2	1:38.63	1st place, gold medalist(s)
Sara Hector	Giant slalom	1:11.22	6	1:10.31	19	2:21.53	10
Lisa Hörnblad	Downhill	—N/a				1:41.63	17
Lisa Hörnblad	Super-G	—N/a				1:22.79	24
Anna Swenn-Larsson	Slalom	49.29	3	50.32	10	1:39.61	5
Emelie Wikström	Slalom	49.76	6	51.81	28	1:41.57	12

Mixed

Athlete	Event	Round of 16	Quarterfinals	Semifinals	Final / BM	
Athlete	Event	Opposition Result	Opposition Result	Opposition Result	Opposition Result	Rank
Frida Hansdotter; Mattias Hargin; Kristoffer Jakobsen; André Myhrer; Anna Swenn-Larsson; Emelie Wikström	Team	Slovenia; W 3–1	Austria; L 0–4	did not advance		5

== Biathlon ==
Based on their Nations Cup rankings in the 2016–17 Biathlon World Cup, Sweden has qualified a team of 5 men and 5 women.

Men

Athlete	Event	Time	Misses	Rank
Peppe Femling	Sprint	24:52.2	2 (1+1)	32
Peppe Femling	Pursuit	37:45.8	5 (1+1+1+2)	42
Fredrik Lindström	Sprint	25:14.1	3 (2+1)	39
Fredrik Lindström	Pursuit	36:41.5	5 (0+2+2+1)	29
Fredrik Lindström	Individual	49:25.9	1 (0+0+0+1)	8
Fredrik Lindström	Mass start	37:02.6	3 (0+0+2+1)	15
Jesper Nelin	Sprint	24:46.8	3 (1+2)	30
Jesper Nelin	Pursuit	35:15.5	4 (0+1+1+2)	18
Jesper Nelin	Individual	50:37.1	3 (0+0+0+3)	24
Jesper Nelin	Mass start	36:21.9	2 (0+2+0+0)	9
Martin Ponsilouma	Individual	51:56.6	2 (2+0+0+0)	38
Sebastian Samuelsson	Sprint	24:12.6	2 (2+0)	14
Sebastian Samuelsson	Pursuit	33:03.7	1 (0+0+1+0)	2nd place, silver medalist(s)
Sebastian Samuelsson	Individual	48:32.9	1 (0+0+1+0)	4
Sebastian Samuelsson	Mass start	37:58.8	4 (0+1+2+1)	23
Peppe Femling; Fredrik Lindström; Jesper Nelin; Sebastian Samuelsson	Team relay	1:15:16.5	0+7 (0+2 0+5)	1st place, gold medalist(s)

Women

Athlete	Event	Time	Misses	Rank
Mona Brorsson	Sprint	22:42.2	2 (1+1)	27
Mona Brorsson	Pursuit	32:29.8	1 (0+0+1+0)	10
Mona Brorsson	Individual	44:13.8	2 (1+0+0+1)	14
Mona Brorsson	Mass start	36:55.3	1 (0+0+1+0)	13
Elisabeth Högberg	Sprint	23:05.9	1 (0+1)	35
Elisabeth Högberg	Pursuit	33:45.1	2 (1+0+1+0)	29
Anna Magnusson	Individual	45:27.2	2 (2+0+0+0)	37
Hanna Öberg	Sprint	21:47.0	1 (0+1)	7
Hanna Öberg	Pursuit	31:44.2	3 (1+2+0+0)	5
Hanna Öberg	Individual	41:07.2	0 (0+0+0+0)	1st place, gold medalist(s)
Hanna Öberg	Mass start	36:09.5	1 (0+0+1+0)	5
Linn Persson	Sprint	23:11.5	3 (1+2)	37
Linn Persson	Pursuit	33:21.7	3 (1+0+1+1)	21
Linn Persson	Individual	43:41.5	1 (1+0+0+0)	11
Linn Persson	Mass start	37:54.5	2 (1+0+0+1)	22
Mona Brorsson; Anna Magnusson; Hanna Öberg; Linn Persson	Team relay	1:12:14.1	0+12 (0+7 0+5)	2nd place, silver medalist(s)

Mixed

Athlete	Event	Time	Misses	Rank
Mona Brorsson; Jesper Nelin; Fredrik Lindström; Hanna Öberg	Team relay	1:11:07.5	2+8 (0+2 2+6)	11

== Cross-country skiing ==
Distance
Men

Athlete	Event	Classical		Freestyle		Total		
Athlete	Event	Time	Rank	Time	Rank	Time	Deficit	Rank
Jens Burman	15 km freestyle	—N/a				35:15.7	+1:31.8	19
Jens Burman	30 km skiathlon	41:13.4	25	35:39.4	10	1:17:23.9	+1:03.9	17
Jens Burman	50 km classical	—N/a				2:18:34.5	+10:12.4	28
Marcus Hellner	15 km freestyle	—N/a				34:22.6	+38.7	8
Marcus Hellner	30 km skiathlon	40:34.2	10	36:00.3	15	1:17:04.8	+44.8	12
Calle Halfvarsson	15 km freestyle	—N/a				34:44.5	+1:00.6	9
Calle Halfvarsson	30 km skiathlon	—N/a				did not finish		
Calle Halfvarsson	50 km classical	—N/a				did not finish		
Daniel Rickardsson	15 km freestyle	—N/a				34:55.1	+1:11.2	11
Daniel Rickardsson	30 km skiathlon	40:34.0	9	36:04.1	17	1:17:12.1	+52.2	14
Daniel Rickardsson	50 km classical	—N/a				2:12:12.5	+3:50.4	7
Viktor Thorn	50 km classical	—N/a				2:21:53.8	+13:31.7	40
Jens Burman; Calle Halfvarsson; Marcus Hellner; Daniel Rickardsson	4 × 10 km relay	—N/a				1:35:10.5	+2:05.6	5

Women

Athlete	Event	Classical		Freestyle		Total		
Athlete	Event	Time	Rank	Time	Rank	Time	Deficit	Rank
Ebba Andersson	10 km freestyle	—N/a				26:32.9	+1:32.4	13
Ebba Andersson	15 km skiathlon	21:56.0	5	18:59.8	4	40:55.8	+10.9	4
Ebba Andersson	30 km classical	—N/a				1:27:14.8	+4:57.2	13
Hanna Falk	10 km freestyle	—N/a				27:08.5	+2:08.0	21
Anna Haag	15 km skiathlon	22:48.1	24	21:13.7	44	44:01.8	+3:16.9	32
Anna Haag	30 km classical	—N/a				1:34:31.0	+12:13.4	29
Ida Ingemarsdotter	10 km freestyle	—N/a				27:42.6	+2:42.1	34
Charlotte Kalla	10 km freestyle	—N/a				25:20.8	+20.3	2nd place, silver medalist(s)
Charlotte Kalla	15 km skiathlon	21:55.2	4	18:49.7	1	40:44.9	+0.0	1st place, gold medalist(s)
Charlotte Kalla	30 km classical	—N/a				1:25:14.8	+2:57.2	5
Stina Nilsson	15 km skiathlon	21:59.1	12	19:34.7	10	41:33.8	+48.9	10
Stina Nilsson	30 km classical	—N/a				1:24:16.5	+1:58.9	3rd place, bronze medalist(s)
Ebba Andersson; Anna Haag; Charlotte Kalla; Stina Nilsson	4 × 5 km relay	—N/a				51:26.3	+2.0	2nd place, silver medalist(s)

Sprint
Men

Athlete	Event	Qualification		Quarterfinal		Semifinal		Final	
Athlete	Event	Time	Rank	Time	Rank	Time	Rank	Time	Rank
Calle Halfvarsson	Sprint	3:13.27	10 Q	3:11.95	3	did not advance			13
Teodor Peterson	Sprint	3:11.55	5 Q	3:12.23	2 Q	3:11.02	5	DNA	9
Oskar Svensson	Sprint	3:12.02	7 Q	3:08.77	1 Q	3:10.61	2 Q	3:13.48	5
Viktor Thorn	Sprint	3:12.19	8 Q	3:17.33	6	did not advance			27
Calle Halfvarsson; Marcus Hellner	Team sprint	—N/a				15:58.99	2 Q	15:59.33	4

Women

Athlete	Event	Qualification		Quarterfinal		Semifinal		Final	
Athlete	Event	Time	Rank	Time	Rank	Time	Rank	Time	Rank
Anna Dyvik	Sprint	3:17.99	14 Q	3:13.09	3 q	3:15.77	6	DNA	12
Hanna Falk	Sprint	3:12.54	4 Q	3:11.08	1 Q	3:11.14	3 q	3:15.00	5
Ida Ingemarsdotter	Sprint	3:16.06	8 Q	3:14.58	3	did not advance			13
Stina Nilsson	Sprint	3:08.74	1 Q	3:10.90	1 Q	3:10.52	1 Q	3:03.84	1st place, gold medalist(s)
Charlotte Kalla; Stina Nilsson	Team sprint	—N/a				16:23.28	2 Q	15:56.66	2nd place, silver medalist(s)

Maja Dahlqvist, Gustav Eriksson, Emil Jönsson, Maria Nordström, Björn Sandström and Emma Wikén were also registered as members of the Swedish squad but were not selected for any of the events.

== Curling ==
Summary

Team	Event	Group stage										Tiebreaker	Semifinal	Final / BM	
Team	Event	Opposition Score	Opposition Score	Opposition Score	Opposition Score	Opposition Score	Opposition Score	Opposition Score	Opposition Score	Opposition Score	Rank	Opposition Score	Opposition Score	Opposition Score	Rank
Niklas Edin; Oskar Eriksson; Rasmus Wranå; Christoffer Sundgren; Henrik Leek	Men's tournament	(Denmark) DEN; W 9–5	(South Korea) KOR; W 7–2	(United States) USA; W 10–4	(United Kingdom) GBR; W 8–6	(Canada) CAN; W 5–2	(Japan) JPN; W 11–4	(Switzerland) SUI; L 3–10	(Italy) ITA; W 7–3	(Norway) NOR; L 2–7	1 Q	BYE	SUI; W 9–3	USA; L 7–10	2nd place, silver medalist(s)
Anna Hasselborg; Sara McManus; Agnes Knochenhauer; Sofia Mabergs; Jennie Wåhlin	Women's tournament	(Denmark) DEN; W 9–3	(Canada) CAN; W 7–6	(International Olympic Committee) OAR; W 5–4	(Switzerland) SUI; W 8–7	(United Kingdom) GBR; W 8–6	(South Korea) KOR; L 6–7	(Japan) JPN; L 4–5	(China) CHN; W 8–4	(United States) USA; W 9–6	2 Q	BYE	GBR; W 10–5	KOR; W 8–3	1st place, gold medalist(s)

=== Men's tournament ===
Sweden has qualified their men's team (five athletes), by finishing in the top seven teams in Olympic Qualification points.

Team: Niklas Edin (skip), Oskar Eriksson, Rasmus Wranå, Christoffer Sundgren, Henrik Leek (reserve)

Final round robin standings
Team	Skip	Pld	W	L	PF	PA	EW	EL	BE	SE	S%	Qualification
Sweden	Niklas Edin	9	7	2	62	43	34	28	13	8	87%	Playoffs
Canada	Kevin Koe	9	6	3	56	46	36	34	14	8	87%	Playoffs
United States	John Shuster	9	5	4	67	63	37	39	4	6	80%	Playoffs
Great Britain	Kyle Smith	9	5	4	55	60	40	37	8	7	82%	Tiebreaker
Switzerland	Peter de Cruz	9	5	4	60	55	39	37	10	6	83%	Tiebreaker
Norway	Thomas Ulsrud	9	4	5	52	56	34	39	7	8	82%	
South Korea	Kim Chang-min	9	4	5	65	63	39	39	8	8	82%	
Japan	Yusuke Morozumi	9	4	5	48	56	33	35	13	5	81%	
Italy	Joël Retornaz	9	3	6	50	56	37	38	15	7	81%	
Denmark	Rasmus Stjerne	9	2	7	53	70	36	39	12	5	83%	

Round-robin

Sweden has a bye in draws 3, 7 and 11.

Draw 1

Wednesday, 14 February, 09:05

Sheet A	1	2	3	4	5	6	7	8	9	10	Final
Denmark (Stjerne)	0	0	0	2	0	0	1	0	2	0	5
Sweden (Edin) 🔨	0	2	0	0	3	2	0	1	0	1	9

Draw 2

Wednesday, 14 February, 20:05

Sheet B	1	2	3	4	5	6	7	8	9	10	Final
South Korea (Kim)	0	0	0	1	0	0	1	0	0	X	2
Sweden (Edin) 🔨	0	2	0	0	2	1	0	1	1	X	7

Draw 4

Friday, 16 February, 09:05

Sheet D	1	2	3	4	5	6	7	8	9	10	Final
Sweden (Edin) 🔨	4	1	0	2	0	1	0	2	X	X	10
United States (Shuster)	0	0	1	0	1	0	2	0	X	X	4

Draw 5

Friday, 16 February, 20:05

Sheet B	1	2	3	4	5	6	7	8	9	10	Final
Sweden (Edin) 🔨	1	0	0	2	0	3	0	0	2	X	8
Great Britain (Smith)	0	2	1	0	2	0	0	1	0	X	6

Draw 6

Saturday, 17 February, 14:05

Sheet C	1	2	3	4	5	6	7	8	9	10	Final
Canada (Koe) 🔨	0	2	0	0	0	0	0	0	0	X	2
Sweden (Edin)	0	0	0	0	2	2	0	1	0	X	5

Draw 8

Sunday, 18 February, 20:05

Sheet A	1	2	3	4	5	6	7	8	9	10	Final
Sweden (Edin) 🔨	3	0	2	0	0	1	0	5	X	X	11
Japan (Morozumi)	0	1	0	0	1	0	2	0	X	X	4

Draw 9

Monday, 19 February, 14:05

Sheet B	1	2	3	4	5	6	7	8	9	10	Final
Sweden (Edin)	0	0	0	2	0	1	0	X	X	X	3
Switzerland (de Cruz) 🔨	2	1	1	0	1	0	5	X	X	X	10

Draw 10

Tuesday, 20 February, 09:05

Sheet D	1	2	3	4	5	6	7	8	9	10	Final
Italy (Retornaz)	0	0	0	1	1	0	0	1	0	X	3
Sweden (Edin) 🔨	3	1	1	0	0	1	0	0	1	X	7

Draw 12

Wednesday, 21 February, 14:05

Sheet C	1	2	3	4	5	6	7	8	9	10	Final
Sweden (Edin) 🔨	0	0	2	0	0	0	X	X	X	X	2
Norway (Ulsrud)	1	0	0	3	2	1	X	X	X	X	7

Semifinal

Thursday, 22 February, 20:05

Sheet A	1	2	3	4	5	6	7	8	9	10	Final
Sweden (Edin) 🔨	2	0	0	4	0	2	1	0	X	X	9
Switzerland (de Cruz)	0	1	0	0	1	0	0	1	X	X	3

Final

Saturday, 24 February, 15:35

Sheet B	1	2	3	4	5	6	7	8	9	10	Final
Sweden (Edin) 🔨	0	2	0	0	2	0	1	0	2	X	7
United States (Shuster)	0	0	2	1	0	2	0	5	0	X	10

=== Women's tournament ===
Sweden has qualified their women's team (five athletes), by finishing in the top seven teams in Olympic Qualification points.

Team: Anna Hasselborg (skip), Sara McManus, Agnes Knochenhauer, Sofia Mabergs, Jennie Wåhlin (reserve)

Final round robin standings
Team	Skip	Pld	W	L	PF	PA	EW	EL	BE	SE	S%	Qualification
South Korea	Kim Eun-jung	9	8	1	75	44	41	34	5	15	79%	Playoffs
Sweden	Anna Hasselborg	9	7	2	64	48	42	34	14	13	83%	Playoffs
Great Britain	Eve Muirhead	9	6	3	61	56	39	38	12	6	79%	Playoffs
Japan	Satsuki Fujisawa	9	5	4	59	55	38	36	10	13	75%	Playoffs
China	Wang Bingyu	9	4	5	57	65	35	38	12	5	78%	
Canada	Rachel Homan	9	4	5	68	59	40	36	10	12	81%	
Switzerland	Silvana Tirinzoni	9	4	5	60	55	34	37	12	7	78%	
United States	Nina Roth	9	4	5	56	65	38	39	7	6	78%	
Olympic Athletes from Russia	Victoria Moiseeva	9	2	7	45	76	34	40	8	6	76%	
Denmark	Madeleine Dupont	9	1	8	50	72	32	41	10	6	73%	

Round-robin

Sweden has a bye in draws 2, 6 and 10.

Draw 1

Wednesday, 14 February, 14:05

Sheet C	1	2	3	4	5	6	7	8	9	10	Final
Denmark (Dupont) 🔨	0	0	0	1	0	0	2	0	X	X	3
Sweden (Hasselborg)	1	0	2	0	2	2	0	2	X	X	9

Draw 3

Thursday, 15 February, 20:05

Sheet B	1	2	3	4	5	6	7	8	9	10	11	Final
Canada (Homan) 🔨	0	0	2	0	1	0	1	1	0	1	0	6
Sweden (Hasselborg)	2	0	0	1	0	2	0	0	1	0	1	7

Draw 4

Friday, 16 February, 14:05

Sheet D	1	2	3	4	5	6	7	8	9	10	11	Final
Sweden (Hasselborg)	0	0	0	0	1	0	1	0	2	0	1	5
Olympic Athletes from Russia (Moiseeva) 🔨	0	0	0	1	0	1	0	1	0	1	0	4

Draw 5

Saturday, 17 February, 09:05

Sheet A	1	2	3	4	5	6	7	8	9	10	Final
Switzerland (Tirinzoni)	0	2	2	0	0	0	0	0	1	2	7
Sweden (Hasselborg) 🔨	1	0	0	1	0	1	3	2	0	0	8

Draw 7

Sunday, 18 February, 14:05

Sheet B	1	2	3	4	5	6	7	8	9	10	11	Final
Great Britain (Muirhead)	0	0	0	2	1	0	0	1	0	2	0	6
Sweden (Hasselborg) 🔨	0	2	1	0	0	1	0	0	2	0	2	8

Draw 8

Monday, 19 February, 09:05

Sheet C	1	2	3	4	5	6	7	8	9	10	Final
Sweden (Hasselborg)	1	0	0	0	1	0	1	0	2	1	6
South Korea (Kim) 🔨	0	1	0	2	0	2	0	2	0	0	7

Draw 9

Monday, 19 February, 20:05

Sheet D	1	2	3	4	5	6	7	8	9	10	Final
Japan (Fujisawa) 🔨	0	1	0	0	1	0	0	0	2	1	5
Sweden (Hasselborg)	0	0	1	1	0	1	0	1	0	0	4

Draw 11

Wednesday, 21 February, 09:05

Sheet B	1	2	3	4	5	6	7	8	9	10	Final
Sweden (Hasselborg) 🔨	0	2	1	0	2	0	0	3	0	X	8
China (Wang)	0	0	0	1	0	2	0	0	1	X	4

Draw 12

Wednesday, 21 February, 20:05

Sheet A	1	2	3	4	5	6	7	8	9	10	Final
Sweden (Hasselborg) 🔨	3	0	1	0	1	0	0	1	0	3	9
United States (Roth)	0	2	0	1	0	0	2	0	1	0	6

Semifinal

Friday, 23 February, 20:05

Sheet C	1	2	3	4	5	6	7	8	9	10	Final
Sweden (Hasselborg) 🔨	0	2	0	1	0	2	3	0	2	X	10
Great Britain (Muirhead)	0	0	1	0	2	0	0	2	0	X	5

Final

Sunday, 25 February, 09:05

Sheet B	1	2	3	4	5	6	7	8	9	10	Final
South Korea (Kim) 🔨	1	0	0	0	0	1	0	1	0	X	3
Sweden (Hasselborg)	0	0	2	1	1	0	3	0	1	X	8

== Figure skating ==
Sweden had originally qualified one male and one female figure skater, based on its placement at the 2017 Nebelhorn Trophy in Oberstdorf, Germany. One of the original competitors, Alexander Majorov, withdrew in January 2018 due to personal commitments.

Athlete	Event	SP		FS		Total	
Athlete	Event	Points	Rank	Points	Rank	Points	Rank
Anita Östlund	Ladies' singles	49.14	28	did not advance			

== Freestyle skiing ==
Moguls

Athlete	Event	Qualification								Final											
Athlete	Event	Run 1				Run 2				Run 1				Run 2				Run 3			
Athlete	Event	Time	Points	Total	Rank	Time	Points	Total	Rank	Time	Points	Total	Rank	Time	Points	Total	Rank	Time	Points	Total	Rank
Felix Elofsson	Men's moguls	24.65	58.36	73.85	18	25.14	58.43	73.28	14	did not advance											24
Ludvig Fjällström	Men's moguls	25.07	53.63	68.57	25	26.51	57.32	70.36	16	did not advance											26
Walter Wallberg	Men's moguls	25.67	59.46	73.61	19	25.05	59.50	74.47	11	did not advance											21

Ski cross

Athlete	Event	Seeding		Round of 16	Quarterfinal	Semifinal	Final	
Athlete	Event	Time	Rank	Position	Position	Position	Position	Rank
Viktor Andersson	Men's ski cross	1:11.20	29	4	did not advance			29
Erik Mobärg	Men's ski cross	1:10.36	22	4	did not advance			26
Victor Öhling Norberg	Men's ski cross	1:10.26	19	3	did not advance			22
Lisa Andersson	Women's ski cross	1:16.15	17	1 Q	2 Q	4 FB	2	6
Sandra Näslund	Women's ski cross	1:13.58	4	1 Q	2 Q	1 FA	4	4

Slopestyle

Athlete	Event	Qualification				Final				
Athlete	Event	Run 1	Run 2	Best	Rank	Run 1	Run 2	Run 3	Best	Rank
Henrik Harlaut	Men's slopestyle	18.00	75.80	75.80	17	did not advance				
Oliwer Magnusson	Men's slopestyle	73.20	69.20	73.20	18	did not advance				
Jesper Tjäder	Men's slopestyle	60.60	56.00	60.60	23	did not advance				
Oscar Wester	Men's slopestyle	40.60	95.40	95.40	1 Q	7.60	62.00	12.60	62.00	11
Jennie-Lee Burmansson	Women's slopestyle	17.40	77.00	77.00	11 Q	42.00	65.00	24.40	65.00	8
Emma Dahlström	Women's slopestyle	91.40	57.60	91.40	1 Q	16.60	52.40	15.40	52.40	11

== Ice hockey ==
Summary

Key:

- OT – Overtime
- GWS – Match decided by penalty-shootout

Team	Event	Group stage				Qualification playoff	Quarterfinal	Semifinal / Pl.	Final / BM / Pl.	
Team	Event	Opposition Score	Opposition Score	Opposition Score	Rank	Opposition Score	Opposition Score	Opposition Score	Opposition Score	Rank
Sweden men's	Men's tournament	Norway; W 4–0	Germany; W 1–0	Finland; W 3–1	1 QQ	BYE	Germany; L 3–4 OT	did not advance		5
Sweden women's	Women's tournament	Japan; W 2–1	Korea; W 8–0	Switzerland; L 1–2	2 Q	—N/a	Finland; L 2–7	Japan; L 1–2 OT	Korea; W 6–1	7

=== Men's tournament ===
Sweden men's national ice hockey team qualified by finishing 3rd in the 2015 IIHF World Ranking.

Team roster

The following is the Swedish roster for the men's ice hockey tournament at the 2018 Winter Olympics.

Head coach: (Sweden) Rikard Grönborg Assistant coaches: (Sweden) Johan Garpenlöv, (Sweden) Peter Popovic

No.	Pos.	Name	Height	Weight	Birthdate	Birthplace	2017–18 team
1	G	Jhonas Enroth	1.79 m (5 ft 10 in)	79 kg (174 lb)	25 June 1988	Stockholm	(Belarus) HC Dinamo Minsk (KHL)
4	D	Staffan Kronwall – A	1.95 m (6 ft 5 in)	102 kg (225 lb)	10 September 1982	Stockholm	(Russia) Lokomotiv Yaroslavl (KHL)
5	D	Mikael Wikstrand	1.86 m (6 ft 1 in)	95 kg (209 lb)	5 November 1993	Karlstad	(Sweden) Färjestad BK (SHL)
6	D	Patrik Hersley	1.91 m (6 ft 3 in)	95 kg (209 lb)	23 June 1986	Malmö	(Russia) SKA Saint Petersburg (KHL)
8	D	Johan Fransson	1.86 m (6 ft 1 in)	90 kg (200 lb)	18 February 1985	Kalix	(Switzerland) Genève-Servette HC (NL)
10	F	Joakim Lindström	1.85 m (6 ft 1 in)	87 kg (192 lb)	5 December 1983	Skellefteå	(Sweden) Skellefteå AIK (SHL)
12	F	Fredrik Pettersson	1.75 m (5 ft 9 in)	81 kg (179 lb)	10 June 1987	Gothenburg	(Switzerland) ZSC Lions (NL)
15	D	Simon Bertilsson	1.83 m (6 ft 0 in)	90 kg (200 lb)	19 April 1991	Karlskoga	(Sweden) Brynäs IF (SHL)
17	F	Pär Lindholm	1.81 m (5 ft 11 in)	85 kg (187 lb)	5 October 1991	Skellefteå	(Sweden) Skellefteå AIK (SHL)
18	F	Dennis Everberg	1.93 m (6 ft 4 in)	93 kg (205 lb)	31 December 1991	Västerås	(Russia) HC Neftekhimik Nizhnekamsk (KHL)
19	F	Patrik Zackrisson	1.80 m (5 ft 11 in)	85 kg (187 lb)	27 March 1987	Ekerö	(Russia) HC Sibir Novosibirsk (KHL)
20	F	Joel Lundqvist – C	1.83 m (6 ft 0 in)	90 kg (200 lb)	2 March 1982	Åre	(Sweden) Frölunda HC (SHL)
22	F	Alexander Bergström	1.90 m (6 ft 3 in)	87 kg (192 lb)	18 January 1986	Osby	(Russia) HC Sibir Novosibirsk (KHL)
25	F	Viktor Stålberg	1.89 m (6 ft 2 in)	94 kg (207 lb)	17 January 1986	Gothenburg	(Switzerland) EV Zug (NL)
26	D	Rasmus Dahlin	1.89 m (6 ft 2 in)	85 kg (187 lb)	13 April 2000	Trollhättan	(Sweden) Frölunda HC (SHL)
28	F	Dick Axelsson	1.91 m (6 ft 3 in)	93 kg (205 lb)	25 April 1987	Stockholm	(Sweden) Färjestad BK (SHL)
29	D	Erik Gustafsson – A	1.79 m (5 ft 10 in)	90 kg (200 lb)	15 December 1988	Sundsvall	(Russia) HC Neftekhimik Nizhnekamsk (KHL)
30	G	Viktor Fasth	1.83 m (6 ft 0 in)	86 kg (190 lb)	8 August 1982	Kalix	(Sweden) Växjö Lakers (SHL)
35	G	Magnus Hellberg	1.96 m (6 ft 5 in)	93 kg (205 lb)	4 April 1991	Uppsala	(China) Kunlun Red Star (KHL)
37	F	John Norman	1.80 m (5 ft 11 in)	85 kg (187 lb)	6 January 1991	Stockholm	(Finland) Jokerit (KHL)
45	F	Oscar Möller	1.78 m (5 ft 10 in)	82 kg (181 lb)	22 January 1989	Stockholm	(Sweden) Skellefteå AIK (SHL)
48	F	Carl Klingberg	1.90 m (6 ft 3 in)	98 kg (216 lb)	28 January 1991	Gothenburg	(Switzerland) EV Zug (NL)
51	D	Jonas Ahnelöv	1.88 m (6 ft 2 in)	95 kg (209 lb)	11 December 1987	Stockholm	(Russia) Avangard Omsk (KHL)
58	F	Anton Lander	1.83 cm (0.72 in)	84 kg (185 lb)	24 April 1991	Sundsvall	(Russia) Ak Bars Kazan (KHL)
67	F	Linus Omark	1.79 m (5 ft 10 in)	82 kg (181 lb)	5 February 1987	Övertorneå	(Russia) Salavat Yulaev Ufa (KHL)

Preliminary round

Pos	Team	Pld	W	OTW	OTL	L	GF	GA	GD	Pts	Qualification
1	Sweden	3	3	0	0	0	8	1	+7	9	Quarterfinals
2	Finland	3	2	0	0	1	11	6	+5	6	Qualification playoffs
3	Germany	3	0	1	0	2	4	7	−3	2	Qualification playoffs
4	Norway	3	0	0	1	2	2	11	−9	1	Qualification playoffs

Source: IIHF

15 February 2018; 16:40	Norway	0–4 (0–2, 0–0, 0–2)	Sweden	Gangneung Hockey Centre, Gangneung; Attendance: 3,961

Game reference

Lars Haugen
Goalies
Viktor Fasth
Referees:
(Russia) Roman Gofman
(Switzerland) Tobias Wehrli
Linesmen:
(Russia) Gleb Lazarev
(United States) Judson Ritter

0–1	05:29 – Lindholm (Omark, Möller)
0–2	16:46 – Lander (Bertilsson)
0–3	48:42 – Everberg (Omark, Fransson)
0–4	49:04 – Wikstrand (Omark, Everberg)

14 min
Penalties
12 min
17
Shots
27

16 February 2018; 21:10	Sweden	1–0 (1–0, 0–0, 0–0)	Germany	Kwandong Hockey Centre, Gangneung; Attendance: 3,077

Game reference
Jhonas Enroth	Goalies	Timo Pielmeier	Referees: (United States) Timothy Mayer (Russia) Konstantin Olenin; Linesmen: (Switzerland) Roman Kaderli (Canada) Nathan Vanoosten
Stålberg (Zackrisson, Bergström) – 02:00 / 1–0			Referees: (United States) Timothy Mayer (Russia) Konstantin Olenin; Linesmen: (Switzerland) Roman Kaderli (Canada) Nathan Vanoosten
10 min	Penalties	6 min	Referees: (United States) Timothy Mayer (Russia) Konstantin Olenin; Linesmen: (Switzerland) Roman Kaderli (Canada) Nathan Vanoosten
26	Shots	28	Referees: (United States) Timothy Mayer (Russia) Konstantin Olenin; Linesmen: (Switzerland) Roman Kaderli (Canada) Nathan Vanoosten

18 February 2018; 21:10	Sweden	3–1 (1–0, 0–1, 2–0)	Finland	Kwandong Hockey Centre, Gangneung; Attendance: 3,861

Game reference

Viktor Fasth
Goalies
Mikko Koskinen
Referees:
(Canada) Oliver Gouin
(Czech Republic) Antonín Jeřábek
Linesmen:
(Switzerland) Roman Kaderli
(Germany) Lukas Kohlmüller

Lander (Omark, Fasth) – 14:53	1–0
	1–1	21:32 – Kemppainen (Koivisto, Junttila)
Zackrisson (Fransson) – 48:53	2–1
Möller (Omark) (PP, ENG) – 59:55	3–1

10 min
Penalties
14 min
23
Shots
19

Quarterfinal

21 February 2018; 21:10	Sweden	3–4 OT (0–2, 0–0, 3–1) (OT 0–1)	Germany	Kwandong Hockey Centre, Pyeongchang; Attendance: 2,092

Game reference

Viktor Fasth
Goalies
Danny aus den Birken
Referees:
(United States) Mark Lemelin
(Finland) Aleksi Rantala
Linesmen:
(Czech Republic) Miroslav Lhotský
(Canada) Nathan Vanoosten

	0–1	13:48 – Ehrhoff (Hager, Schütz) (PP)
	0–2	14:17 – Noebels (Kink)
Lander (Dahlin, Omark) – 46:25	1–2
	1–3	48:28 – Kahun (Mauer)
Hersley (Omark, Wikstrand) (PP) – 49:35	2–3
Wikstrand (Zackrisson) – 51:37	3–3
	3–4	61:30 – Reimer (Ehliz, Boyle)

4 min
Penalties
6 min
34
Shots
25

=== Women's tournament ===
Sweden women's national ice hockey team qualified by finishing 5th in the 2016 IIHF World Ranking.

Team roster

The following is the Swedish roster for the women's ice hockey tournament at the 2018 Winter Olympics.

Head coach: (Sweden) Leif Boork Assistant coaches: (Canada) Alexandra Cipparone, (Canada) Jared Cipparone

No.	Pos.	Name	Height	Weight	Birthdate	Birthplace	2017–18 team
1	G	Sara Grahn	1.70 m (5 ft 7 in)	70 kg (150 lb)	25 September 1988	Örebro	(Sweden) Brynäs IF (SWHL)
2	D	Emmy Alasalmi	1.61 m (5 ft 3 in)	65 kg (143 lb)	17 January 1994	Stockholm	(Sweden) AIK IF (SWHL)
5	D	Johanna Fällman	1.73 m (5 ft 8 in)	71 kg (157 lb)	21 June 1990	Luleå	(Sweden) Luleå HF (SWHL)
6	F	Sara Hjalmarsson	1.76 m (5 ft 9 in)	74 kg (163 lb)	8 February 1998	Bankeryd	(Sweden) AIK IF (SWHL)
7	D	Johanna Olofsson	1.69 m (5 ft 7 in)	69 kg (152 lb)	13 July 1991	Storuman	(Sweden) Modo Hockey (SWHL)
8	D	Annie Svedin	1.63 m (5 ft 4 in)	67 kg (148 lb)	12 October 1991	Sundsvall	(Sweden) Modo Hockey (SWHL)
10	D	Emilia Ramboldt – C	1.75 m (5 ft 9 in)	74 kg (163 lb)	31 August 1988	Stockholm	(Sweden) Linköpings HC (SWHL)
12	D	Maja Nylén Persson	1.64 m (5 ft 5 in)	65 kg (143 lb)	20 November 2000	Avesta	(Sweden) Leksands IF (SWHL)
13	D	Elin Lundberg	1.63 m (5 ft 4 in)	69 kg (152 lb)	15 May 1993	Karlstad	(Sweden) Leksands IF (SWHL)
14	F	Sabina Küller	1.75 m (5 ft 9 in)	73 kg (161 lb)	22 September 1994	Norrtälje	(Sweden) AIK IF (SWHL)
15	F	Lisa Johansson	1.61 m (5 ft 3 in)	58 kg (128 lb)	11 April 1992	Nybro	(Sweden) AIK IF (SWHL)
16	F	Pernilla Winberg – A	1.65 m (5 ft 5 in)	64 kg (141 lb)	24 February 1989	Limhamn	(Sweden) Linköpings HC (SWHL)
18	F	Anna Borgqvist – A	1.63 m (5 ft 4 in)	63 kg (139 lb)	11 June 1992	Växjö	(Sweden) Brynäs IF (SWHL)
19	F	Maria Lindh	1.73 m (5 ft 8 in)	63 kg (139 lb)	29 September 1993	Stockholm	(Sweden) Djurgårdens IF (SWHL)
20	F	Fanny Rask	1.68 m (5 ft 6 in)	65 kg (143 lb)	21 May 1991	Leksand	(Sweden) HV 71 (SWHL)
21	F	Erica Udén Johansson	1.71 m (5 ft 7 in)	70 kg (150 lb)	20 July 1989	Sundsvall	(Sweden) Brynäs IF (SWHL)
23	F	Rebecca Stenberg	1.65 m (5 ft 5 in)	60 kg (130 lb)	18 September 1992	Piteå	(Sweden) Luleå HF (SWHL)
24	F	Erika Grahm	1.75 m (5 ft 9 in)	77 kg (170 lb)	26 January 1991	Kramfors	(Sweden) Modo Hockey (SWHL)
26	F	Hanna Olsson	1.72 m (5 ft 8 in)	68 kg (150 lb)	20 January 1999	Hälsö	(Sweden) Djurgårdens IF (SWHL)
27	F	Emma Nordin	1.68 m (5 ft 6 in)	72 kg (159 lb)	22 March 1991	Örnsköldsvik	(Sweden) Luleå HF (SWHL)
29	F	Olivia Carlsson	1.74 m (5 ft 9 in)	71 kg (157 lb)	2 March 1995	Karlstad	(Sweden) Modo Hockey (SWHL)
30	G	Minatsu Murase	1.68 m (5 ft 6 in)	62 kg (137 lb)	23 June 1995	Stockholm	(Sweden) AIK IF (SWHL)
35	G	Sarah Berglind	1.63 m (5 ft 4 in)	63 kg (139 lb)	10 February 1996	Östersund	(Sweden) Modo Hockey (SWHL)

Preliminary round

Pos	Team	Pld	W	OTW	OTL	L	GF	GA	GD	Pts	Qualification
1	Switzerland	3	3	0	0	0	13	2	+11	9	Quarterfinals
2	Sweden	3	2	0	0	1	11	3	+8	6	Quarterfinals
3	Japan	3	1	0	0	2	6	6	0	3	Classification
4	Korea (H)	3	0	0	0	3	1	20	−19	0	Classification

Source: IIHF
(H) Host

10 February 2018; 16:40	Japan	1–2 (0–1, 1–0, 0–1)	Sweden	Kwandong Hockey Centre, Gangneung; Attendance: 3,762

Game reference

Nana Fujimoto
Goalies
Sara Grahn
Referees:
(United States) Katie Guay
(United States) Melissa Szkola
Linesmen:
(Slovenia) Nataša Pagon
(Czech Republic) Zuzana Svobodová

	0–1	02:21 – Rask (Küller, Carlsson)
Ukita (Kubo) – 36:52	1–1
	1–2	41:53 – Hjalmarsson (Grahm)

2 min
Penalties
8 min
31
Shots
26

12 February 2018; 21:10	Sweden	8–0 (4–0, 1–0, 3–0)	Korea	Kwandong Hockey Centre, Gangneung; Attendance: 4,244

Game reference

Sara Grahn
Goalies
Shin So-jung
Referees:
(Canada) Gabrielle Ariano-Lortie
(Switzerland) Drahomira Fialova
Linesmen:
(Finland) Johanna Tauriainen
(United States) Jessica Leclerc

Nylén Persson (Alasalmi) (PP) – 04:00	1–0
Lundberg (Rask, Grahm) – 09:47	2–0
Fällman (Rask, Küller) – 10:17	3–0
Udén Johansson (Johansson) – 17:04	4–0
Winberg (Lundberg, Alasalmi) – 24:08	5-0
Nordin (Winberg) – 41:09	6–0
Winberg (Grahm, Nordin) – 41:45	7–0
Stenberg (Winberg) – 45:34	8–0

8 min
Penalties
6 min
50
Shots
19

14 February 2018; 12:10	Sweden	1–2 (0–0, 0–1, 1–1)	Switzerland	Kwandong Hockey Centre, Gangneung; Attendance: 3,545

Game reference

Sara Grahn
Goalies
Florence Schelling
Referees:
(Slovakia) Nikoleta Celárová
(United States) Katie Guay
Linesmen:
(France) Charlotte Girard-Fabre
(Germany) Lisa Linnek

	0–1	33:51 – Müller (Meier, Stalder) (PP)
Borgqvist (Olsson, Nylén Persson) (PP) – 47:35	1–1
	1–2	51:28 – Stänz (Meier, Müller) (PP)

12 min
Penalties
8 min
34
Shots
47

Quarterfinal

17 February 2018; 16:40	Finland	7–2 (3–0, 2–2, 2–0)	Sweden	Kwandong Hockey Centre, Gangneung; Attendance: 3,803

Game reference

Noora Räty
Goalies
Sara Grahn
Sarah Berglind
Referees:
(Switzerland) Drahomira Fialova
(United States) Katie Guay
Linesmen:
(Slovenia) Natasa Pagon
(Czech Republic) Zuzana Svobodová

Nieminen (Hovi) – 06:12	1–0
Välilä (Rahunen) – 15:32	2–0
Tapani (Tulus, Välimäki) (PP) – 17:44	3–0
Karvinen (Tuominen, Savolainen) – 27:14	4–0
	4–1	28:53 – Nordin (Grahm, Svedin)
Välilä (Karvinen, Tapani) – 29:29	5–1
	5–2	39:12 – Stenberg (Nylén Persson) (SH)
Nuutinen (Tulus, Rahunen) - 44:35	6–2
Hakala (Rajahuhta) - 57:47	7–2

4 min
Penalties
12 min
31
Shots
21

5–8th place semifinal

18 February 2018; 16:40	Sweden	1–2 OT (0–0, 1–1, 0–0) (OT: 0–1)	Japan	Kwandong Hockey Centre, Gangneung; Attendance: 3,554

Game reference

Sara Grahn
Goalies
Nana Fujimoto
Referees:
(United States) Dina Allen
(Norway) Aina Hove
Linesmen:
(United States) Jessica Leclerc
(Canada) Justine Todd

	0–1	21:43 – Koike (Yoneyama, Ono)
Johansson (SH) – 26:25	1–1
	1–2	63:16 – A. Toko (Osawa)

8 min
Penalties
8 min
29
Shots
37

Seventh place game

20 February 2018; 12:10	Sweden	6–1 (2–1, 1–0, 3–0)	Korea	Kwandong Hockey Centre, Gangneung; Attendance: 4,125

Game reference

Minatsu Murase
Sarah Berglind
Goalies
Shin So-jung
Han Do-hee
Referees:
(Switzerland) Drahomira Fialova
(Norway) Aina Hove
Linesmen:
(Finland) Jenni Heikkinen
(Slovenia) Nataša Pagon

Küller (Rask, Udén Johansson) – 05:50	1–0
	1–1	06:21 – Han S. (Park J.) (PP)
Alasalmi (Nylén Persson, Borgqvist) (PP) – 19:37	2–1
Grahm (Rask, Nordin) – 36:27	3–1
Svedin (Johansson, Hjalmarsson) – 43:05	4–1
Rask (Lindh) – 49:31	5–1
Johansson (Borgqvist, Hjalmarsson) – 57:19	6–1

6 min
Penalties
4 min
40
Shots
16

== Snowboarding ==
Freestyle

Athlete	Event	Qualification				Final				
Athlete	Event	Run 1	Run 2	Best	Rank	Run 1	Run 2	Run 3	Best	Rank
Måns Hedberg	Men's big air	did not start								
Måns Hedberg	Men's slopestyle	46.25	DNS	46.25	13	did not advance				25
Niklas Mattsson	Men's big air	53.75	90.00	90.00	2 Q	36.00	did not start		36.00	12
Niklas Mattsson	Men's slopestyle	50.81	73.53	73.53	6 Q	38.43	74.71	42.48	74.71	9

== Speed skating ==
Athlete	Event	Final	
Athlete	Event	Time	Rank
Nils van der Poel	Men's 5000 m	6:19.06	14

== See also ==
- Sweden at the 2018 Summer Youth Olympics
- Sweden at the 2018 Winter Paralympics
