= Gangneung Gymnasium =

Multi-purpose indoor arena in South Korea

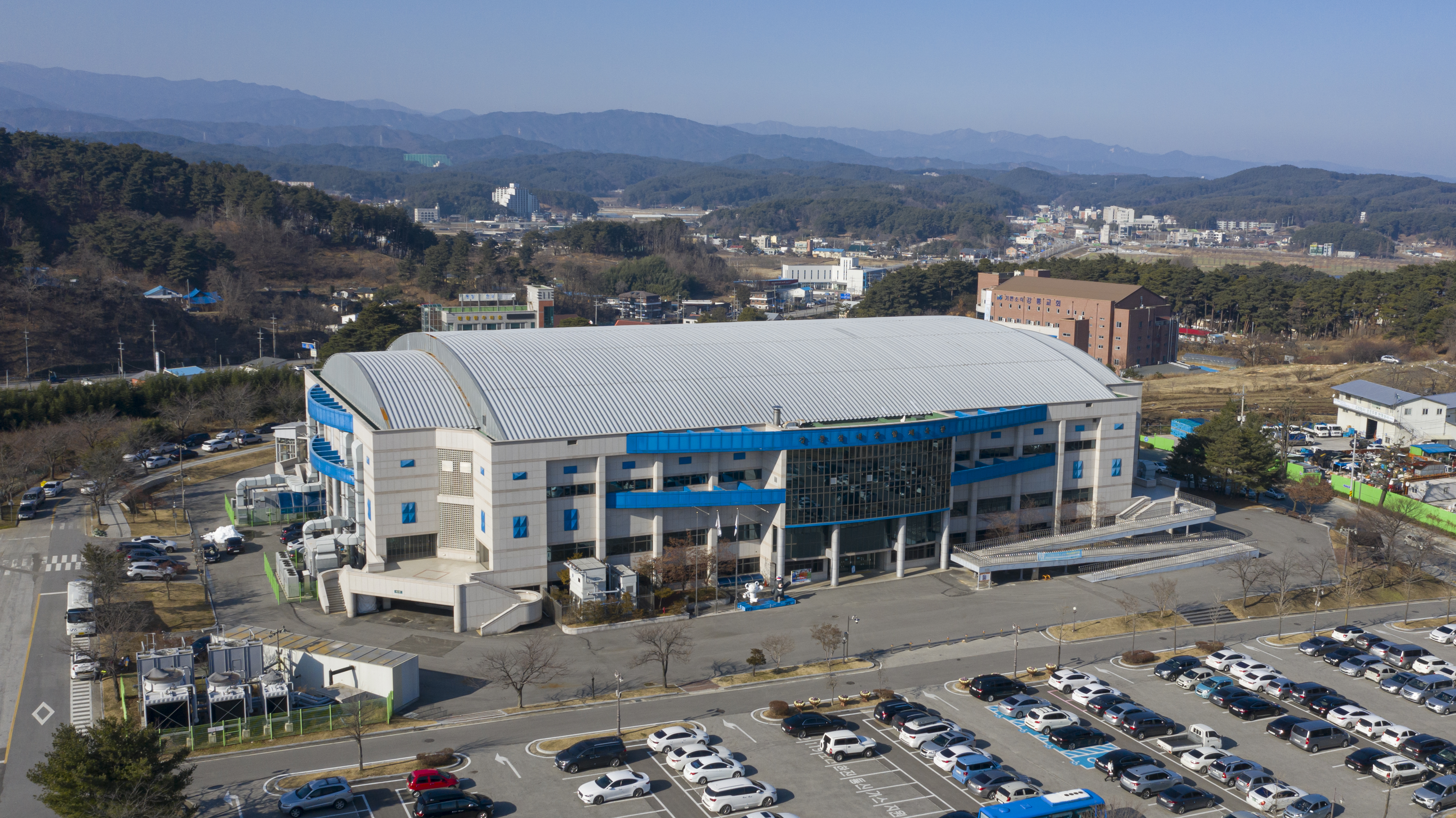
- Interactive map of Gangneung Gymnasium
- Location: Gangneung, South Korea
- Coordinates: 37°46′26″N 128°53′33″E
- Capacity: 3,500 Olympic Mode

Construction
- Opened: 1998

Gangneung Gymnasium (Korean: 강릉실내종합체육관) is a multi-purpose indoor arena, located in the coastal city of Gangneung, South Korea. It was opened in 1998 for ice hockey at the 1999 Asian Winter Games. The seating capacity is 3,500. It is converted into ice surface when needed, while the underground floor is a permanent ice rink.

It was used for the 2009 World Women's Curling Championships, 2013 Special Olympics World Winter Games, 2017 World Junior Curling Championships, and 2017 World Wheelchair Curling Championship. It was used for both the 2018 Winter Olympics and 2018 Winter Paralympics as the venue for curling and wheelchair curling. It also was used for the 2024 Winter Youth Olympics as the venue for curling.

It is the only Olympic venue in Gangneung which existed prior to the selection of PyeongChang as host city of the 2018 Winter Games. For the Games it was named the Gangneung Curling Centre (강릉 컬링 센터). It was renovated between October 2015 and October 2016 in preparation for the Games.

== Gallery ==
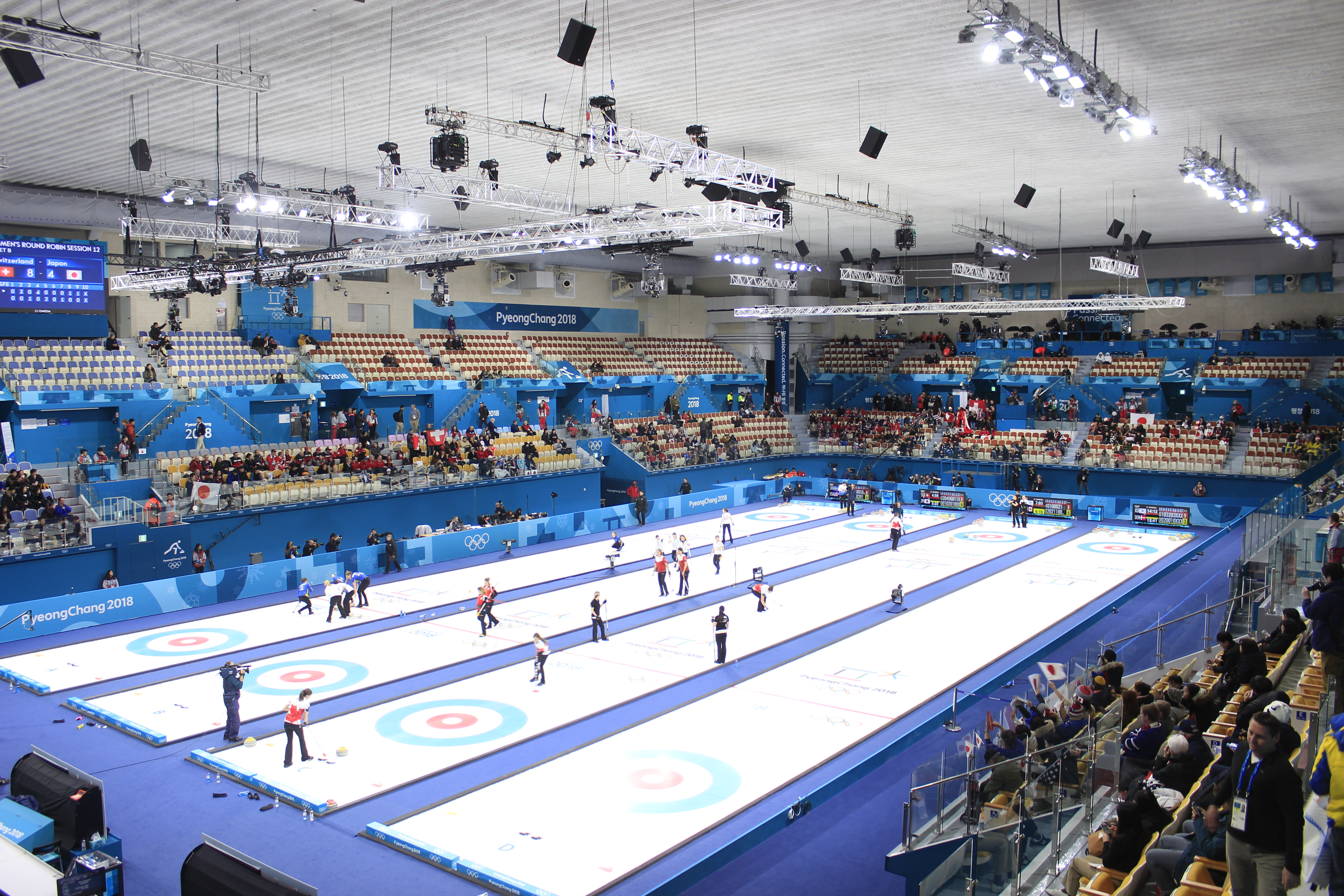

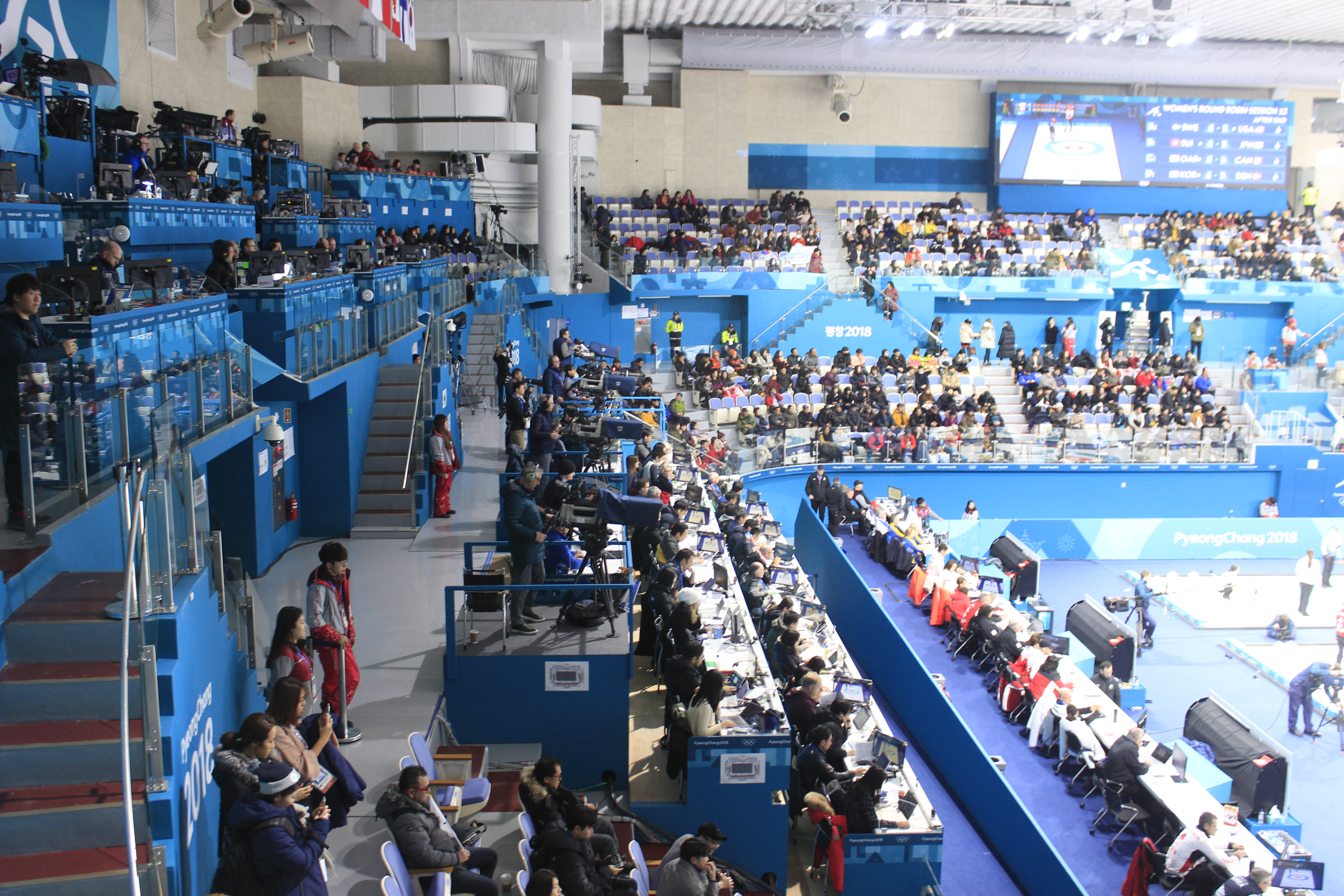

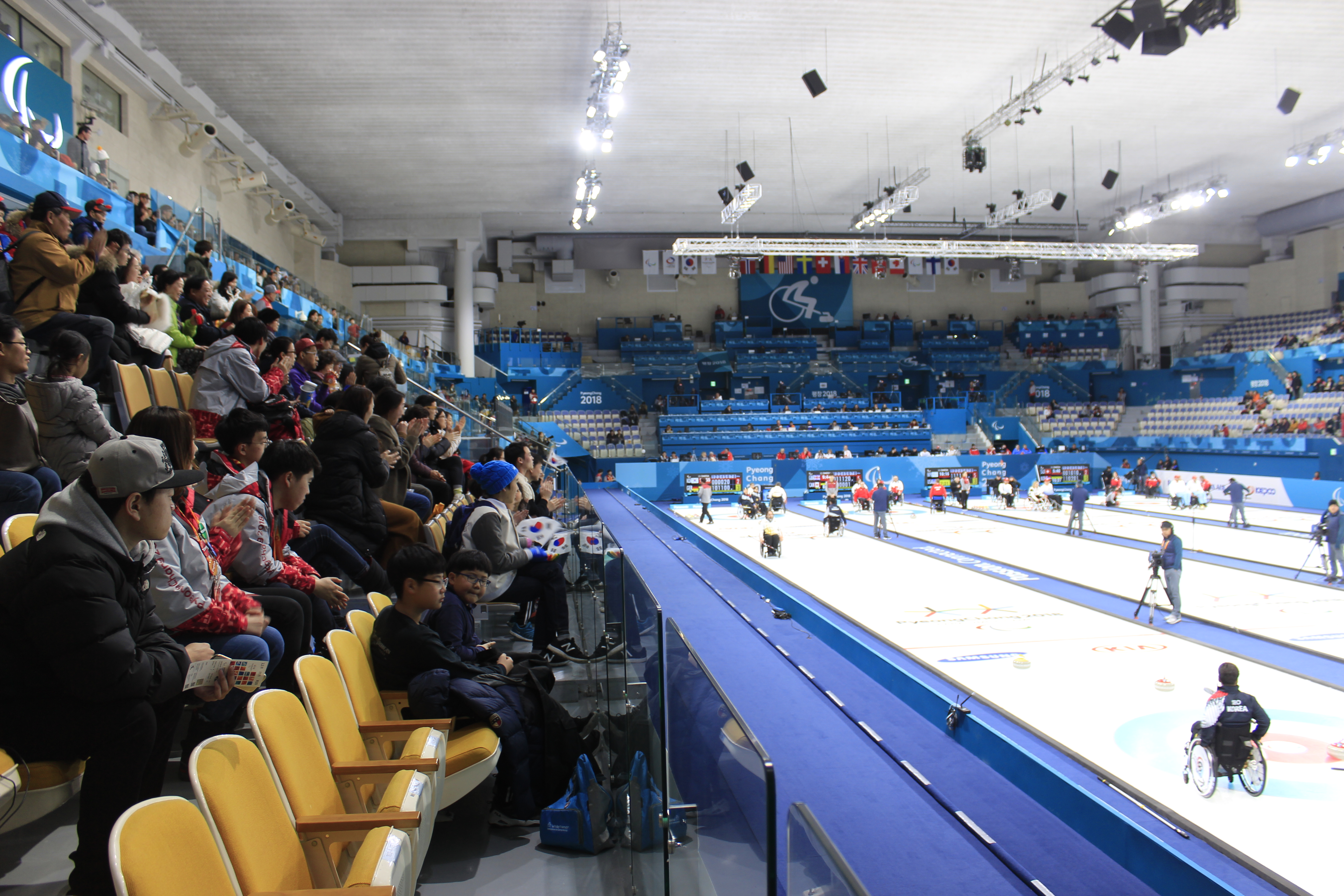

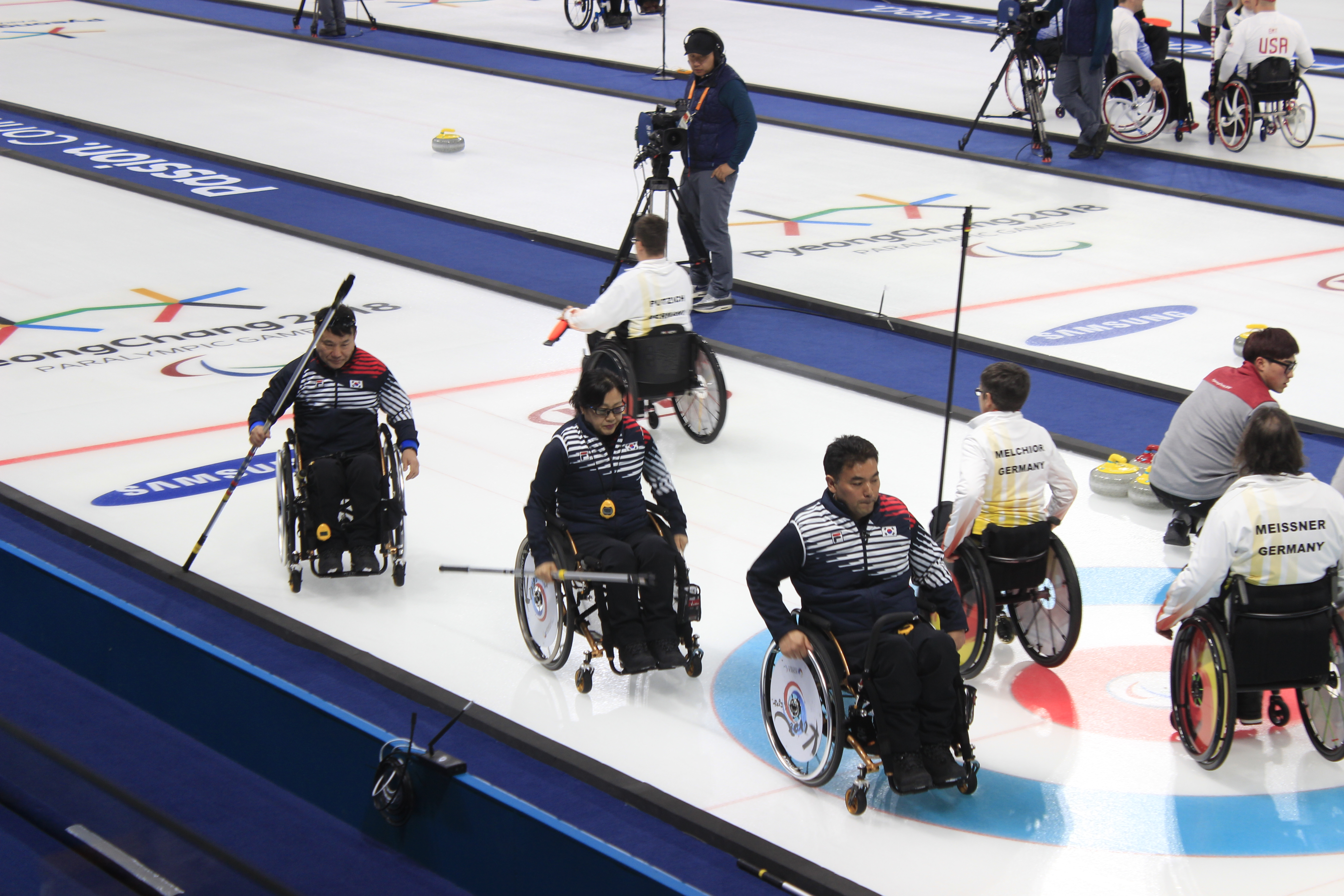
