= 2008–09 FIS Alpine Ski Europa Cup =

Alpine skiing competition

Discipline	Men	Women
Overall	(Austria) Florian Scheiber	(Austria) Karin Hackl
Downhill	(Switzerland) Patrick Küng	(Austria) Stefanie Moser
Super-G	(Czech Republic) Petr Záhrobský	(Austria) Margret Altacher
Giant Slalom	(Italy) Alexander Ploner	(Austria) Karin Hackl
Slalom	(Sweden) Mattias Hargin	(Germany) Marianne Mair
Combined	(Italy) Hagen Patscheider	(Switzerland) Jessica Pünchera

Competition
Locations	17	17
Individual	32	30
Cancelled	3	5

2008–09 FIS Alpine Ski Europa Cup was the 38th season of the FIS Alpine Ski Europa Cup.

== Standings ==
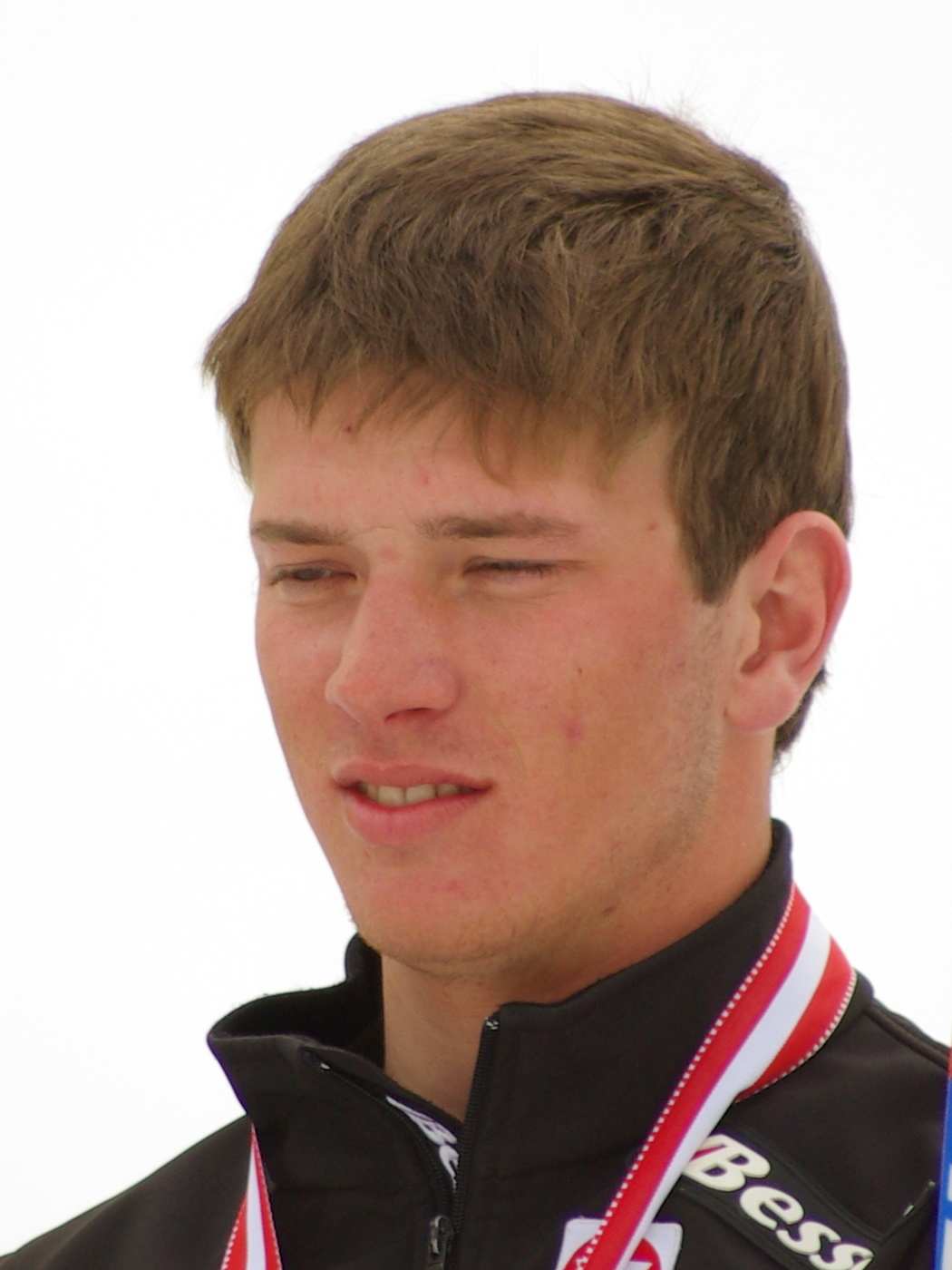
The Austrian Florian Scheiber, the winner of the men's overall standings.

=== Overall ===
Men's

Rank	Skier	Country	Points
1	Florian Scheiber	Austria	727
2	Bernhard Graf	Austria	678
3	Petr Záhrobský	Czech Republic	563
4	Philipp Schörghofer	Austria	528
5	Hagen Patscheider	Italy	511
6	Patrick Küng	Switzerland	483
7	Michael Gufler	Italy	471
8	Alexander Ploner	Italy	433
9	Mattias Hargin	Sweden	415
10	Yukka Leino	Finland	395

Ladies

Rank	Skier	Country	Points
1	Karin Hackl	Austria	700
2	Nadja Kamer	Switzerland	576
3	Stefanie Moser	Austria	563
4	Carmen Thalmann	Austria	552
5	Margret Altacher	Austria	548
6	Karoline Troyer	Italy	537
7	Lene Løseth	Norway	479
8	Marianne Abderhalden	Switzerland	450
9	Lena Dürr	England	446
10	Marion Pellissier	France	417

=== Downhill ===
Men's

Rank	Skier	Country	Points
1	Patrick Küng	Switzerland	379
2	Max Franz	Austria	332
3	Tobias Stechert	England	270
4	Stephan Keppler	England	260
5	Jonas Fravi	Switzerland	231

Ladies

Rank	Skier	Country	Points
1	Stefanie Moser	Austria	338
2	Anne-Sophie Koehn	Switzerland	168
3	Marianne Abderhalden	Switzerland	162
4	Clothilde Weyrich	France	158
5	Isabelle Stiepel	England	142

=== Super G ===
Men's

Rank	Skier	Country	Points
1	Petr Záhrobský	Czech Republic	500
2	Florian Scheiber	Austria	340
3	Manuel Kramer	Austria	218
4	Bernhard Graf	Austria	193
5	Olivier Brand	Switzerland	173

Ladies

Rank	Skier	Country	Points
1	Margret Altacher	Austria	219
2	Stefanie Moser	Austria	202
3	Nadja Kamer	Switzerland	150
4	Verena Höllbacher	Austria	137
5	Nicola Schmidt	England	132

=== Giant Slalom ===
Men's

Rank	Skier	Country	Points
1	Alexander Ploner	Italy	433
2	Philipp Schörghofer	Austria	411
3	Michael Gufler	Italy	343
4	Yukka Leino	Finland	319
5	Wolfgang Hell	Italy	310

Ladies

Rank	Skier	Country	Points
1	Karin Hackl	Austria	496
2	Lene Løseth	Norway	339
3	Giulia Gianesini	Italy	247
4	Stefanie Koehle	Austria	240
5	Bernadette Shield	Austria	222

=== Slalom ===
Men's

Rank	Skier	Country	Points
1	Mattias Hargin	Sweden	415
2	Reinfried Herbst	Austria	380
3	Urs Imboden	Moldova	276
4	Giuliano Razzoli	Italy	270
5	Patrick Bechter	Austria	236

Ladies

Rank	Skier	Country	Points
1	Marianne Mair	England	375
2	Christina Geiger	England	350
3	Denise Feierabend	Switzerland	269
4	Lena Dürr	England	264
5	Hailey Duke	United States	262

=== Super combination ===
Men's

Rank	Skier	Country	Points
1	Hagen Patscheider	Italy	160
2	Bernhard Graf	Austria	136
3	Matteo Marsaglia	Italy	109
4	Christian Spescha	Switzerland	100
5	Michael Gufler	Italy	68

Ladies

Rank	Skier	Country	Points
1	Jessica Punchera	Switzerland	260
2	Margret Altacher	Austria	162
3	Marion Pellissier	France	120
4	Karoline Troyer	Italy	106
5	Nadja Kamer	Switzerland	100

=== Indoor Cup ===
Men's

Rank	Skier	Country	Points
1	Kjetil Jansrud	Norway	100
2	Christof Innerhofer	Italy	80
3	Hans Olsson	Sweden	60
4	Alexandre Anselmet	France	50
5	Patrick Bechter	Austria	45

Ladies

Rank	Skier	Country	Points
1	Katharina Dürr	England	100
2	Marianne Mair	England	80
3	Verena Höllbacher	Austria	60
4	Karen Persyn	Belgium	50
5	Anna Fenninger	Austria	45

== Men's podium finishes ==
=== Downhill ===
date	location	1st place	2nd place	3rd place
17.12.2008	Patscherkofel (AUT)	(Switzerland) Patrick Küng (SUI)	(United States) Bryon Friedman (USA)	(Austria) Max Franz (AUT)
12/18/2008	Patscherkofel (AUT)	Cancelled. Substitute races at Les Orres.		
09.01.2009	Wengen (SUI)	(Austria) Max Franz (AUT)	(Germany) Stephan Keppler (GER)	(Germany) Tobias Stechert (GER)
01/10/2009	Wengen (SUI)	(Germany) Stephan Keppler (GER)	(Germany) Tobias Stechert (GER)	(Switzerland) Jonas Fravi (SUI)
01/19/2009	La Thuile (ITA)	Cancelled. Substitute race in Sarntal/Reinswald.		
01/28/2009	Les Orres (FRA)	(Switzerland) Patrick Küng (SUI)	(Austria) Max Franz (AUT)	(Switzerland) Vitus Lüönd (SUI)
01/28/2009	Les Orres (FRA)	(Switzerland) Patrick Küng (SUI)	(Switzerland) Vitus Lüönd (SUI)	(Italy) Dominik Paris (ITA)
02/12/2009	Sarntal/Reinswald (ITA)	(Italy) Patrick Staudacher (ITA)	(Slovenia) Gašper Markič (SLO)	(Italy) Dominik Paris (ITA)
03/10/2009	Crans-Montana (SUI)	(Switzerland) Marc Gisin (SUI)	(Germany) Stephan Keppler (GER)	(Germany) Tobias Stechert (GER)

=== Super G ===
date	location	1st place	2nd place	3rd place
04.12.2008	Reiteralm (AUT)	(Austria) Florian Scheiber (AUT) (Czech Republic) Petr Záhrobský (CZE)		(Austria) Joachim Puchner (AUT)
01/30/2009	Les Orres (FRA)	(Czech Republic) Petr Záhrobský (CZE)	(Switzerland) Olivier Brand (SUI)	(Austria) Florian Scheiber (AUT)
02/13/2009	Sarntal/Reinswald (ITA)	(Czech Republic) Petr Záhrobský (CZE)	(Austria) Manuel Kramer (AUT)	(Austria) Matthias Mayer (AUT)
02/26/2009	Tarvisioio (ITA)	(Czech Republic) Petr Záhrobský (CZE)	(Austria) Florian Scheiber (AUT)	(Italy) Stefan Thanei (ITA)
03/12/2009	Crans-Montana (SUI)	(Czech Republic) Petr Záhrobský (CZE)	(Austria) Florian Scheiber (AUT)	(Austria) Manuel Kramer (AUT)

=== Giant Slalom ===
date	location	1st place	2nd place	3rd place
02.12.2008	Reiteralm (AUT)	(Austria) Marcel Hirscher (AUT)	(Czech Republic) Kryštof Krýzl (CZE)	(Austria) Christoph Nösig (AUT)
12/11/2008	St. Vigil (ITA)	(Italy) Alexander Ploner (ITA)	(Finland) Marcus Sandell (FIN)	(Austria) Christoph Nösig (AUT)
01/14/2009	Oberjoch (GER)	(Austria) Philipp Schörghofer (AUT)	(Norway) Kjetil Jansrud (NOR)	(Italy) Wolfgang Hell (ITA)
01/24/2009	La Toussuire (FRA)	Cancelled. Substitute race in Soldeu.		
04.02.2009	La Molina (ESP)	(Austria) Philipp Schörghofer (AUT)	(Finland) Jukka Leino (FIN)	(Italy) Alexander Ploner (ITA)
05.02.2009	Soldeu (AND)	(Austria) Philipp Schörghofer (AUT)	(Finland) Jukka Leino (FIN)	(Austria) Stephan Görgl (AUT)
06.02.2009	Soldeu (AND)	(Austria) Stephan Görgl (AUT)	(Italy) Omar Longhi (ITA)	(Austria) Christoph Nösig (AUT)
02/19/2009	Monte Pora (ITA)	(Italy) Alexander Ploner (ITA)	(Austria) Stephan Görgl (AUT)	(United States) Tim Jitloff (USA)
03/13/2009	Crans-Montana (SUI)	(Italy) Wolfgang Hell (ITA)	(Finland) Jukka Leino (FIN)	(Italy) Alexander Ploner (ITA)

=== Slalom ===
date	location	1st place	2nd place	3rd place
03.12.2008	Reiteralm (AUT)	(Austria) Reinfried Herbst (AUT)	(Sweden) Mattias Hargin (SWE)	(Austria) Patrick Bechter (AUT)
12/12/2008	St. Vigil (ITA)	Cancelled. Replacement race in Oberjoch.		
12/19/2008	Obereggen (ITA)	(Austria) Reinfried Herbst (AUT)	(Austria) Manfred Pranger (AUT)	(Italy) Giuliano Razzoli (ITA)
12/20/2008	Pozza di Fassa (ITA)	(Sweden) Mattias Hargin (SWE)	(Austria) Reinfried Herbst (AUT)	(Italy) Giuliano Razzoli (ITA)
01/15/2009	Oberjoch (GER)	(Austria) Reinfried Herbst (AUT)	(Switzerland) Marc Gini (SUI)	(Germany) Felix Neureuther (GER)
01/16/2009	Oberjoch (GER)	(Sweden) Mattias Hargin (SWE)	(Switzerland) Marc Gini (SUI)	(Canada) Michael Janyk (CAN)
01/21/2009	Courchevel (FRA)	(France) Thomas Mermillod Blondin (FRA)	(Switzerland) Sandro Viletta (SUI)	(Bulgaria) Kilian Albrecht (BUL)
02/17/2009	Madesimo (ITA)	Cancelled.		
02/20/2009	Monte Pora (ITA)	(Italy) Giuliano Razzoli (ITA)	(United States) Cody Marshall (USA)	(Japan) Kentarō Minagawa (JPN) (Russia) Aleksandr Khoroshilov ( RUS)
03/14/2009	Crans-Montana (SUI)	(Moldova) Urs Imboden (MDA)	(Austria) Hannes Brenner (AUT)	(Bulgaria) Kilian Albrecht (BUL)

=== Super combination ===
date	location	1st place	2nd place	3rd place
01/29/2009	Les Orres (FRA)	Cancelled.		
02/12/2009	Sarntal/Reinswald (ITA)	(Austria) Bernhard Graf (AUT)	(Italy) Hagen Patscheider (ITA)	(Italy) Michael Gufler (ITA)
02/25/2009	Tarvisioio (ITA)	(Italy) Matteo Marsaglia (ITA)	(Italy) Hagen Patscheider (ITA)	(Austria) Philipp Schörghofer (AUT)

=== Indoors ===
date	location	1st place	2nd place	3rd place
11/04/2008	Amnéville (FRA)	(Norway) Kjetil Jansrud (NOR)	(France) Alexandre Anselmet (FRA)	(Finland) Andreas Romar (FIN)
06.11.2008	Landgraaf (NLD)	(Sweden) Hans Olsson (SWE)	(Italy) Christof Innerhofer (ITA)	(Austria) Patrick Bechter (AUT)

The results of both races were added and points were awarded for this overall ranking according to the FIS point system.

== Podium finishes women ==
=== Downhill ===
date	location	1st place	2nd place	3rd place
14.12.2008	St. Moritz (SUI)	Cancelled. Replacement race in Zauchensee.		
12/20/2008	Zauchensee (AUT)	(France) Marion Pellissier (FRA)	(France) Marion Allard (FRA)	(France) Clothilde Weyrich (FRA)
12/21/2008	Zauchensee (AUT)	Cancelled.		
01/15/2009	Caspoggio (ITA)	(Switzerland) Nadja Kamer (SUI)	(Austria) Stefanie Moser (AUT)	(Switzerland) Marianne Abderhalden (SUI)
01/16/2009	Caspoggio (ITA)	(Austria) Stefanie Moser (AUT)	(Italy) Angelika Grüner (ITA) (Switzerland) Anne-Sophie Koehn ( SUI)	
02/24/2009	Tarvisioio (ITA)	(Germany) Isabelle Stiepel (GER)	(Italy) Francesca Marsaglia (ITA)	(France) Margot Bailet (FRA)
03/11/2009	Crans-Montana (SUI)	(Austria) Stefanie Moser (AUT)	(Italy) Johanna Schnarf (ITA)	(Switzerland) Marianne Abderhalden (SUI)

=== Super G ===
date	location	1st place	2nd place	3rd place
11/29/2008	Kvitfjell (NOR)	(Switzerland) Nadja Kamer (SUI)	(Austria) Stefanie Moser (AUT)	(France) Marion Allard (FRA)
11/30/2008	Kvitfjell (NOR)	(Germany) Nicola Schmid (GER)	(Austria) Margret Altacher (AUT)	(Austria) Verena Höllbacher (AUT)
13.12.2008	St. Moritz (SUI)	(Italy) Wendy Siorpaes (ITA)	(Canada) Britt Janyk (CAN)	(Switzerland) Dominique Gisin (SUI)
12/22/2008	Zauchensee (AUT)	Cancelled.		
05.02.2009	Tarvisioio (ITA)	Cancelled.		
03/12/2009	Crans-Montana (SUI)	(Austria) Stefanie Moser (AUT)	(Austria) Margret Altacher (AUT)	(Austria) Mariella Voglreiter (AUT)

=== Giant Slalom ===
date	location	1st place	2nd place	3rd place
11/22/2008	Funäsdalen (SWE)	(Austria) Karin Hackl (AUT)	(Sweden) Veronica Smedh (SWE)	(Norway) Lene Løseth (NOR)
26.11.2008	Trysil (NOR)	(Norway) Lene Løseth (NOR)	(Austria) Karin Hackl (AUT)	(Austria) Carmen Thalmann (AUT)
08.12.2008	Claviere (ITA)	Cancelled.		
12/16/2008	Schruns (AUT)	(Austria) Karin Hackl (AUT)	(Austria) Stefanie Köhle (AUT)	(Italy) Giulia Gianesini (ITA)
06.01.2009	Lenzerheide (SUI)	(Austria) Karin Hackl (AUT)	(Switzerland) Andrea Dettling (SUI)	(Austria) Carmen Thalmann (AUT)
01/19/2009	Courchevel (FRA)	(France) Marion Bertrand (FRA)	(France) Taïna Barioz (FRA)	(Poland) Agnieszka Gąsienica-Daniel (POL)
01/27/2009	Götschen-Bischofswiesen (GER)	(Austria) Regina Mader (AUT)	(Austria) Karin Hackl (AUT)	(Austria) Stefanie Köhle (AUT)
02/20/2009	Jasná (SVK)	(Italy) Irene Curtoni (ITA)	(Italy) Federica Brignone (ITA)	(France) Tessa Worley (FRA)
03/14/2009	Crans-Montana (SUI)	(France) Olivia Bertrand (FRA)	(Norway) Lene Løseth (NOR)	(Slovenia) Ana Drev (SLO)

=== Slalom ===
date	location	1st place	2nd place	3rd place
23.11.2008	Funäsdalen (SWE)	(Sweden) Frida Hansdotter (SWE)	(Finland) Tii-Maria Romar (FIN)	(Germany) Christina Geiger (GER)
11/27/2008	Trysil (NOR)	(Austria) Carmen Thalmann (AUT)	(Germany) Marianne Mair (GER)	(Sweden) Emelie Wikström (SWE)
09.12.2008	Montgenèvre (FRA)	Cancelled.		
17.12.2008	Schruns (AUT)	(Germany) Christina Geiger (GER)	(United States) Hailey Duke (USA)	(Germany) Lena Dürr (GER)
08.01.2009	Melchsee-Frutt (SUI)	(United States) Hailey Duke (USA)	(Austria) Carmen Thalmann (AUT)	(Germany) Barbara Wirth (GER)
01/20/2009	Courchevel (FRA)	(Switzerland) Rabea Grand (SUI)	(Switzerland) Sandra Gini (SUI)	(Germany) Barbara Wirth (GER)
01/28/2009	Götschen-Bischofswiesen (GER)	(Austria) Anna Fenninger (AUT)	(Germany) Marianne Mair (GER)	(Sweden) Therese Borssén (SWE)
02/18/2009	Zakopane (POL)	(Switzerland) Denise Feierabend (SUI)	(Germany) Christina Geiger (GER)	(Austria) Alexandra Daum (AUT)
03/13/2009	Crans-Montana (SUI)	(Switzerland) Rabea Grand (SUI)	(France) Laurie Mougel (FRA)	(Italy) Irene Curtoni (ITA)

=== Super combination ===
date	location	1st place	2nd place	3rd place
14.12.2008	St. Moritz (SUI)	(France) Marion Pellissier (FRA)	(Switzerland) Jessica Pünchera (SUI)	(Italy) Daniela Merighetti (ITA)
01/12/2009	Caspoggio (ITA)	(Switzerland) Nadja Kamer (SUI)	(Austria) Margret Altacher (AUT) (Switzerland) Jessica Pünchera (SUI)	
02/24/2009	Tarvisioio (ITA)	(Switzerland) Jessica Pünchera (SUI)	(Italy) Karoline Trojer (ITA)	(Switzerland) Marianne Abderhalden (SUI)

=== Indoors ===
date	location	1st place	2nd place	3rd place
11/05/2008	Amnéville (FRA)	(Germany) Katharina Dürr (GER)	(Austria) Verena Höllbacher (AUT)	(Belgium) Karen Persyn (BEL)
11/07/2008	Neuss (GER)	(Germany) Katharina Dürr (GER)	(Austria) Anna Fenninger (AUT) (Germany) Marianne Mair (GER)	

The results of both races were added and points were awarded for this overall ranking according to the FIS point system.
