= 2009–10 FIS Alpine Ski Europa Cup =

Alpine skiing competition

Discipline	Men	Women
Overall	(Switzerland) Christian Spescha	(Germany) Lena Dürr
Downhill	(Switzerland) Cornel Züger	(Switzerland) Rabea Grand
Super-G	(Czech Republic) Petr Záhrobský	(Austria) Mariella Voglreiter
Giant Slalom	(Austria) Christoph Nösig	(Norway) Lene Løseth
Slalom	(Sweden) Anton Lahdenperä	(Austria) Bernadette Schild
Combined	(Italy) Paolo Pangrazzi	(Italy) Elena Curtoni

Competition
Locations	20	19
Individual	36	36
Cancelled	2	2

2009–10 FIS Alpine Ski Europa Cup was the 39th season of the FIS Alpine Ski Europa Cup.

== Standings ==
=== Overall ===
Men

Rank	Skier	Country	Points
1	Christian Spescha	Switzerland	666
2	Anthony Obert	France	603
3	Marc Gisin	Switzerland	568
4	Christoph Nosig	Austria	565
5	Joachim Puchner	Austria	560
6	Ami Oreiller	Switzerland	544
7	Cornel Züger	Switzerland	537
8	Bernhard Graf	Austria	507
9	Anton Lahdenperä	Sweden	474
10	Björn Sieber	Austria	453

Final score after 36 races

Ladies

Rank	Skier	Country	Points
1	Lena Dürr	England	858
2	Ramona Siebenhofer	Austria	762
3	Elena Curtoni	Italy	692
4	Mariella Voglreiter	Austria	676
5	Bernadette Shield	Austria	609
6	Francesca Marsaglia	Italy	564
7	Camilla Borsotti	Italy	548
	Lene Løseth	Norway	548
9	Barbara Wirth	England	507
10	Sara Hector	Sweden	486

Final score after 33 races

=== Downhill ===
Men

Rank	Skier	Country	Points
1	Cornel Züger	Switzerland	405
2	Siegmar Klotz	Italy	354
3	Ami Oreiller	Switzerland	308
4	Marc Gisin	Switzerland	275
5	Christian Spescha	Switzerland	265

Final score after 7 descents

Ladies

Rank	Skier	Country	Points
1	Rabea Grande	Switzerland	225
2	Stefanie Moser	Austria	213
3	Kajsa Kling	Sweden	200
4	Mariella Voglreiter	Austria	190
5	Enrica Cipriani	Italy	164

Final score after 5 descents

=== Super G ===
Men

Rank	Skier	Country	Points
1	Petr Záhrobský	Czech Republic	275
2	Joachim Puchner	Austria	240
3	Patrick Küng	Switzerland	209
4	Philipp Schörghofer	Austria	181
5	Christian Spescha	Switzerland	158

Final score after 5 Super-G

Ladies

Rank	Skier	Country	Points
1	Mariella Voglreiter	Austria	462
2	Elena Curtoni	Italy	369
3	Francesca Marsaglia	Italy	318
4	Priska Nufer	Switzerland	301
5	Christina Staudinger	Austria	298

Final score after 7 Super-G

=== Giant Slalom ===
Men

Rank	Skier	Country	Points
1	Christoph Nosig	Austria	409
2	Florian Eisath	Italy	380
3	Björn Sieber	Austria	347
4	Matts Olsson	Sweden	340
5	Anthony Obert	France	293

Final score after 9 giant slaloms

Ladies

Rank	Skier	Country	Points
1	Lene Løseth	Norway	506
2	Lena Dürr	England	464
3	Ramona Siebenhofer	Austria	369
4	Martina Geisler	Austria	291
5	Kathrin Fuhrer	Switzerland	278

Final score after 9 giant slaloms

=== Slalom ===
Men

Rank	Skier	Country	Points
1	Anton Lahdenperä	Sweden	474
2	Axel Bäck	Sweden	450
3	Jens Byggmark	Sweden	353
4	Stefano Gross	Italy	352
5	Christoph Dreier	Austria	325
5	Naoki Yuasa	Japan	325

Final score after 13 slaloms

Ladies

Rank	Skier	Country	Points
1	Bernadette Shield	Austria	393
2	Emelie Wikstrom	Sweden	388
3	Carmen Thalmann	Austria	367
4	Barbara Wirth	England	356
5	Veronika Zuzulová	Slovakia	300

Final score after 10 slaloms

=== Super combination ===
Men

Rank	Skier	Country	Points
1	Paolo Pangrazzi	Italy	145
2	Andy Plank	Italy	124
3	Mathieu Faivre	France	98
4	Philipp Schörghofer	Austria	90
5	Hannes Wagner	England	88

Final score after 2 super combinations

Ladies

Rank	Skier	Country	Points
1	Elena Curtoni	Italy	114
2	Esther Good	Switzerland	106
3	Mona Løseth	Norway	100
4	Ramona Siebenhofer	Austria	80
5	Michaela Nosig	Austria	77

Final score after 2 super combinations
