= 2013–14 in skiing =

From August 19, 2013 to March 23, 2014, the following skiing events took place at various locations around the world.

== Alpine skiing ==
- October 26, 2013 – March 16, 2014: 2013–14 FIS Alpine Skiing World Cup
  - October 26 – 27: World Cup #1: (Austria) Sölden
    - Men's Giant Slalom winner: (United States) Ted Ligety
    - Women's Giant Slalom winner: (Switzerland) Lara Gut
  - November 16 – 17: World Cup #2: (Finland) Levi
    - Men's Slalom winner: (Austria) Marcel Hirscher
    - Women's Slalom winner: (United States) Mikaela Shiffrin
  - November 26 – December 1: World Cup #3: (United States) Beaver Creek
    - Women's Giant Slalom winner: (Sweden) Jessica Lindell-Vikarby
    - Women's Super G winner: (Switzerland) Lara Gut
    - Women's Downhill winner: (Switzerland) Lara Gut
  - November 27 – December 1: World Cup #4: (Canada) Lake Louise
    - Men's Super G winner: (Norway) Aksel Lund Svindal
    - Men's Downhill winner: (Italy) Dominik Paris
  - December 3 – 8: World Cup #5: (Canada) Lake Louise
    - Women's Super G winner: (Switzerland) Lara Gut
    - Women's Downhill #1 winner: (Germany) Maria Höfl-Riesch
    - Women's Downhill #2 winner: (Germany) Maria Höfl-Riesch
  - December 3 – 8: World Cup #6: (United States) Beaver Creek
    - Men's Giant Slalom winner: (United States) Ted Ligety
    - Men's Super G winner: (Switzerland) Patrick Küng
    - Men's Downhill winner: (Norway) Aksel Lund Svindal
  - December 14 – 15: World Cup #7: (Switzerland) St. Moritz
    - Women's Giant Slalom winner: (France) Tessa Worley
    - Women's Super G winner: (Liechtenstein) Tina Weirather
  - December 14 – 15: World Cup #8: (France) Val-d'Isère
    - Men's Slalom winner: (Austria) Mario Matt
    - Men's Giant Slalom winner: (Austria) Marcel Hirscher
  - December 17: World Cup #9: (France) Courchevel
    - Women's Slalom winner: (Austria) Marlies Schild
  - December 18 – 21: World Cup #10: (Italy) Val Gardena
    - Men's Super G winner: (Norway) Aksel Lund Svindal
    - Men's Downhill winner: (Canada) Erik Guay
  - December 18 – 22: World Cup #11: (France) Val-d'Isère
    - Women's Giant Slalom winner: (Liechtenstein) Tina Weirather
    - Women's Downhill winner: (Switzerland) Marianne Kaufmann-Abderhalden
  - December 22: World Cup #12: (Italy) Alta Badia
    - Men's Giant Slalom winner: (Austria) Marcel Hirscher
  - December 27 – 29: World Cup #13: (Italy) Bormio
    - Men's Downhill winner: (Norway) Aksel Lund Svindal
  - December 28 – 29: World Cup #14: (Austria) Lienz
    - Women's Slalom winner: (Austria) Marlies Schild
    - Women's Giant Slalom winner: (Austria) Anna Fenninger
  - January 5 – 6, 2014: World Cup #16: (Italy) Bormio
    - Women's Slalom winner: (United States) Mikaela Shiffrin
    - Men's Slalom winner: (Germany) Felix Neureuther
  - January 9 – 12: World Cup #17: (Austria) Altenmarkt
    - Women's Downhill winner: (Austria) Elisabeth Görgl
    - Women's Super Combined winner: (Canada) Marie-Michèle Gagnon
  - January 11 – 12: World Cup #18: (Switzerland) Adelboden
    - Men's Giant Slalom winner: (Germany) Felix Neureuther
    - Men's Slalom winner: (Austria) Marcel Hirscher
  - January 14: World Cup #19: (Austria) Flachau
    - Women's Slalom winner: (United States) Mikaela Shiffrin
  - January 14 – 19: World Cup #20: (Switzerland) Wengen
    - Men's Super Combined winner: (United States) Ted Ligety
    - Men's Downhill winner: (Switzerland) Patrick Küng
    - Men's Slalom winner: (France) Alexis Pinturault
  - January 16 – 19: World Cup #21: (Austria) Kitzbühel
    - Men's Slalom winner: (Germany) Felix Neureuther
    - Men's Downhill winner: (Austria) Hannes Reichelt
    - Men's Super G winner: (Switzerland) Didier Défago
    - Men's Super Combined winner: (France) Alexis Pinturault
  - January 23 – 26: World Cup #22: (Italy) Cortina d'Ampezzo
    - Women's Super G #1 winner: (Austria) Elisabeth Görgl
    - Women's Super G #2 winner: (Switzerland) Lara Gut
    - Women's Downhill #1 winner: (Germany) Maria Höfl-Riesch
    - Women's Downhill #2 winner: (Slovenia) Tina Maze
  - January 28: World Cup #23: (Austria) Schladming
    - Men's Slalom winner: (Norway) Henrik Kristoffersen
  - January 30 – February 2: World Cup #24: (Switzerland) St. Moritz
    - Men's Giant Slalom winner: (United States) Ted Ligety
  - February 1 – 2: World Cup #25: (Slovenia) Kranjska Gora
    - Women's Slalom winner: (Sweden) Frida Hansdotter
  - February 25: World Cup #26: (Austria) Innsbruck
    - Mixed Team Event winner: Sweden
  - February 27 – March 2: World Cup #27: (Switzerland) Crans-Montana
    - Women's Downhill winner: (Austria) Andrea Fischbacher
  - February 27 – March 2: World Cup #28: (Norway) Kvitfjell
    - Men's Downhill #1 winners: (Norway) Kjetil Jansrud/ (Austria) Georg Streitberger
    - Men's Downhill #2 winner: (Canada) Erik Guay
    - Men's Super G winner: (Norway) Kjetil Jansrud
  - March 6 – 8: World Cup #29: (Sweden) Åre
    - Women's Giant Slalom #1 winner: (Austria) Anna Fenninger
    - Women's Giant Slalom #2 winner: (Austria) Anna Fenninger
    - Women's Slalom winner: (United States) Mikaela Shiffrin
  - March 8 – 9: World Cup #30: (Slovenia) Kranjska Gora
    - Men's Giant Slalom winner: (United States) Ted Ligety
    - Men's Slalom winner: (Germany) Felix Neureuther
  - March 10 – 16: World Cup #31 (final): Lenzerheide
    - Men's Downhill winner: (Austria) Matthias Mayer
    - Women's Downhill winner: (Switzerland) Lara Gut
    - Men's Super G winner: (France) Alexis Pinturault
    - Women's Super G winner: (Switzerland) Lara Gut
    - Mixed Team Event winners: Switzerland
    - Women's Slalom winner: (United States) Mikaela Shiffrin
    - Men's Giant Slalom winner: (United States) Ted Ligety
    - Men's Slalom winner: (Austria) Marcel Hirscher
    - Women's Giant Slalom winner: (Austria) Anna Fenninger
- Men's Downhill overall winner: (Norway) Aksel Lund Svindal
- Men's Super G overall winner: (Norway) Aksel Lund Svindal
- Men's Giant Slalom overall winner: (United States) Ted Ligety
- Men's Slalom overall winner: (Austria) Marcel Hirscher
- Men's Combined overall winners: (United States) Ted Ligety and (France) Alexis Pinturault (tie)
- Men's Overall winner: (Austria) Marcel Hirscher
- Ladies' Downhill overall winner: (Germany) Maria Höfl-Riesch
- Ladies' Super G overall winner: (Switzerland) Lara Gut
- Ladies' Giant Slalom overall winner: (Austria) Anna Fenninger
- Ladies' Slalom overall winner: (United States) Mikaela Shiffrin
- Ladies' Combined overall winner: (Canada) Marie-Michèle Gagnon
- Ladies' Overall winner: (Austria) Anna Fenninger
- Men's Nations Cup winner: Austria
- Ladies' Nations Cup winner: Austria
- Overall Nations Cup winner: Austria
- February 9 – 22: 2014 Winter Olympics
  - Austria won both the gold and overall medal tallies.

== Biathlon ==
- November 22, 2013 – March 16, 2014: 2013–14 Winter IBU Cup
  - Russia won both the gold and overall medal tallies.
- November 22, 2013 – March 23, 2014: 2013–14 Biathlon World Cup
  - Men's Sprint overall winner: (France) Martin Fourcade
  - Men's Pursuit overall winner: (France) Martin Fourcade
  - Men's Individual overall winner: (Norway) Emil Hegle Svendsen
  - Men's Mass Start overall winner: (France) Martin Fourcade
  - Men's Relay overall winner: Germany
  - Men's Overall winner: (France) Martin Fourcade
  - Women's Sprint overall winner: (Finland) Kaisa Mäkäräinen
  - Women's Pursuit overall winner: (Finland) Kaisa Mäkäräinen
  - Women's Individual overall winner: (Czech Republic) Gabriela Soukalová
  - Women's Mass Start overall winner: (Belarus) Darya Domracheva
  - Women's Relay overall winner: Germany
  - Women's Overall winner: (Finland) Kaisa Mäkäräinen
- January 27 – February 4: IBU Open European Championships at (Czech Republic) Nové Město na Moravě
  - Russia won both the gold and overall medal tallies.
- February 8 – 22: 2014 Winter Olympics
  - Belarus and Norway won 3 gold medals each. However, Norway won the overall medal tally.
- February 26 – March 7: IBU Youth/Junior World Championships at (United States) Presque Isle, Maine
  - Russia won both the gold and overall medal tallies.

== Cross-country skiing ==
- November 29, 2013 – March 16, 2014: 2013–14 FIS Cross-Country World Cup
  - Men's Distance overall winner: (Norway) Martin Johnsrud Sundby
  - Men's Sprint overall winner: (Norway) Ola Vigen Hattestad
  - Men's Overall winner: (Norway) Martin Johnsrud Sundby
  - Ladies' Distance overall winner: (Norway) Therese Johaug
  - Ladies' Sprint overall winner: (United States) Kikkan Randall
  - Ladies' Overall winner: (Norway) Therese Johaug
- February 8 – 23: 2014 Winter Olympics
  - Norway won the gold medal tally. However, Norway and Sweden were tied, with 11 total medals each.

== Freestyle skiing ==
- December 6, 2013 – March 23, 2014: 2013–14 FIS Freestyle Skiing World Cup
  - Men's Moguls overall winner: (Canada) Mikaël Kingsbury
  - Men's Ski Cross overall winner: (Sweden) Victor Öhling Norberg
  - Men's Aerials overall winner: (China) Liu Zhongqing
  - Men's Halfpipe overall winner: (Canada) Justin Dorey
  - Men's Slopestyle overall winner: (Sweden) Jesper Tjäder
  - Men's Overall winner: (Canada) Mikaël Kingsbury
  - Women's Moguls overall winner: (United States) Hannah Kearney
  - Women's Ski Cross overall winner: (Canada) Marielle Thompson
  - Women's Aerials overall winner: (China) Li Nina
  - Women's Halfpipe overall winner: (United States) Devin Logan
  - Women's Slopestyle overall winner: (Germany) Lisa Zimmermann
  - Women's Overall winner: (United States) Hannah Kearney
  - Nations' Cup overall winner: Canada
- February 6 – 21: 2014 Winter Olympics
  - Canada won the gold and overall medal tallies.

== Nordic combined ==
- November 30, 2013 – March 16, 2014: 2013–14 FIS Nordic Combined World Cup
  - Overall winner: (Germany) Eric Frenzel
  - Overall Nations Cup winner: Germany
- February 12 – 20: 2014 Winter Olympics
  - Individual large hill & 10 km XC skiing: (gold) (Norway) Jørgen Graabak; (silver) (Norway) Magnus Moan; (bronze) (Germany) Fabian Rießle
  - Normal hill & 10 km XC skiing: (gold) (Germany) Eric Frenzel; (silver) (Japan) Akito Watabe; (bronze) (Norway) Magnus Krog
  - Team large hill & 4x5km XC skiing: (gold) Norway; (silver) Germany; (bronze) Austria

== Ski jumping ==
- November 22, 2013 – March 23, 2014: 2013–14 FIS Ski Jumping World Cup
  - Men's Ski Flying overall winner: (Slovenia) Peter Prevc
  - Men's Overall winner: (Poland) Kamil Stoch
  - Men's Nations Cup winner: Austria
  - Women's Overall winner: (Japan) Sara Takanashi
  - Women's Nations Cup winner: Japan
- February 8 – 17: 2014 Winter Olympics
  - Men's normal hill: (gold) (Poland) Kamil Stoch; (silver) (Slovenia) Peter Prevc; (bronze) (Norway) Anders Bardal
  - Men's large hill: (gold) (Poland) Kamil Stoch; (silver) (Japan) Noriaki Kasai; (bronze) (Slovenia) Peter Prevc
  - Men's team: (gold) Germany; (silver) Austria; (bronze) Japan
  - Women's normal hill: (gold) (Germany) Carina Vogt; (silver) (Austria) Daniela Iraschko-Stolz; (bronze) (France) Coline Mattel

== Snowboarding ==
- August 19, 2013 – March 15, 2014: 2013–14 FIS Snowboard World Cup
  - Men's Snowboard Cross overall winner: (Italy) Omar Visintin
  - Ladies' Snowboard Cross overall winner: (Canada) Dominique Maltais
  - Men's Parallel overall winner: (Austria) Lukas Mathies
  - Ladies' Parallel overall winner: (Switzerland) Patrizia Kummer
  - Men's snowboard freestyle overall winner: (Sweden) Måns Hedberg
  - Ladies' snowboard freestyle overall winner: (Czech Republic) Šárka Pančochová
  - Men's halfpipe overall winner: (Australia) Scott James
  - Ladies' halfpipe overall winner: (United States) Kelly Clark
  - Men's slope style overall winner: (Sweden) Måns Hedberg
  - Ladies' slope style overall winner: (Czech Republic) Šárka Pančochová
  - Men's Big Air winner: (Finland) Petja Piiroinen
- February 6 – 22: 2014 Winter Olympics
  - United States won both the gold and overall medal tallies.
