= Andrew Weibrecht =

American alpine skier

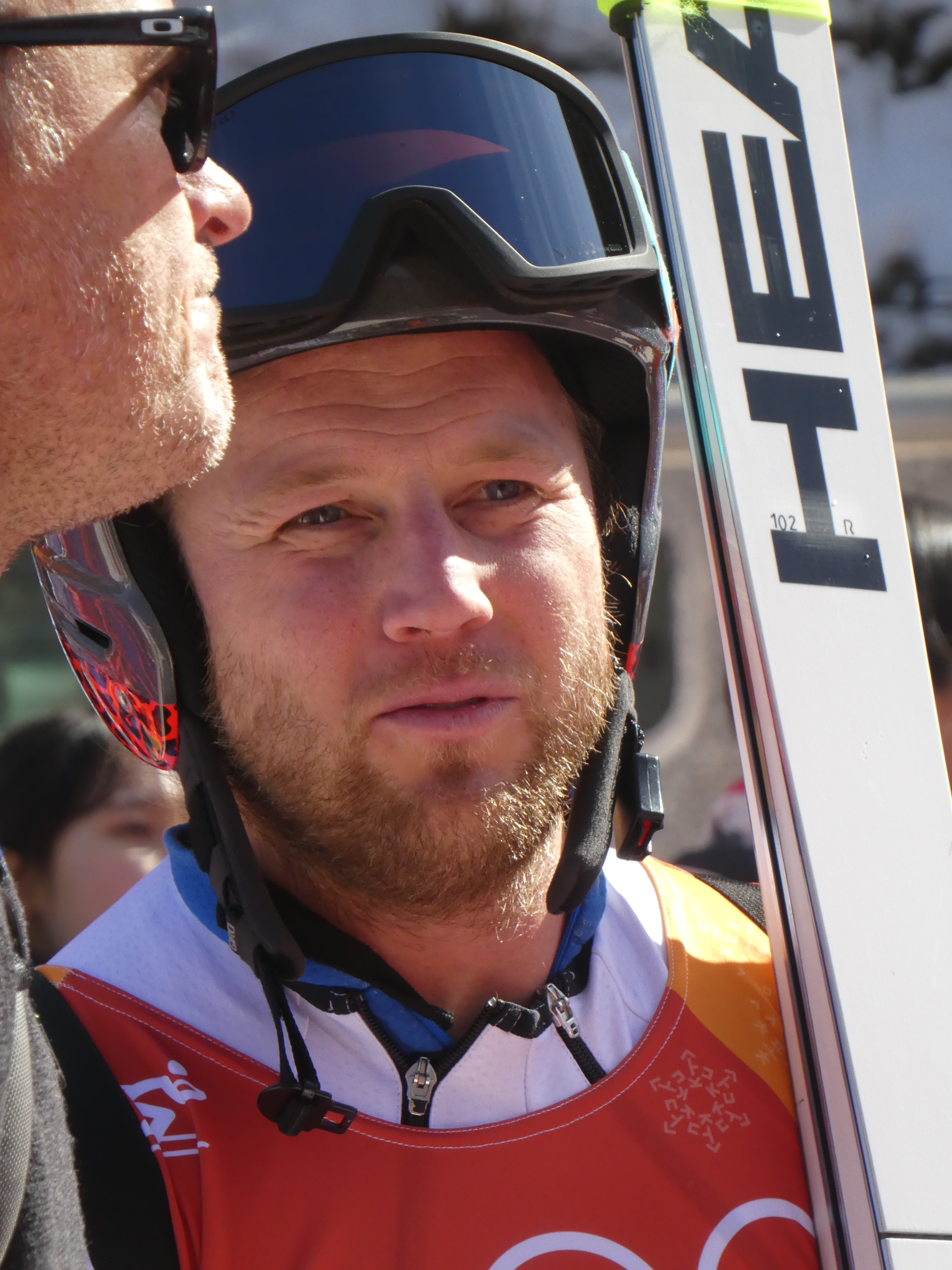
- Weibrecht at the 2018 Olympics

Personal information
- Born: February 10, 1986 (age 40) Lake Placid, New York, U.S.
- Height: 5 ft 6 in (168 cm)

Skiing career
- Sport: Alpine skiing
- Club: New York Ski; Educational Foundation
- Retired: 2018 (age 32)
- Disciplines: Super-G, downhill, combined
- World Cup debut: November 30, 2006 (age 20)

Olympics
- Teams: 3 – (2010, 2014, 2018)
- Medals: 2 (0 gold)

World Championships
- Teams: 4 – (2009, 2013–2017)
- Medals: 0

World Cup
- Seasons: 11 – (2008–2018)
- Wins: 0
- Podiums: 2 – (2 SG)
- Overall titles: 0 – (22nd in 2016)
- Discipline titles: 0 – (8th in SG, 2016)
Medal record
Men's alpine skiing
Representing the United States
Olympic Games
Silver medal – second place	2014 Sochi	Super-G
Bronze medal – third place	2010 Vancouver	Super-G
Junior World Ski Championships
Bronze medal – third place	2006 Quebec	Super-G

Andrew Weibrecht (born February 10, 1986) is a former World Cup alpine ski racer and two-time Olympic medalist from the United States.

Born in Lake Placid, New York, he grew up racing at nearby Whiteface Mountain. Weibrecht raced in all five disciplines and specialized in super-G; he attained his first World Cup podium in December 2015, finishing third in the super-G at Beaver Creek, Colorado.

== Ski racing career ==
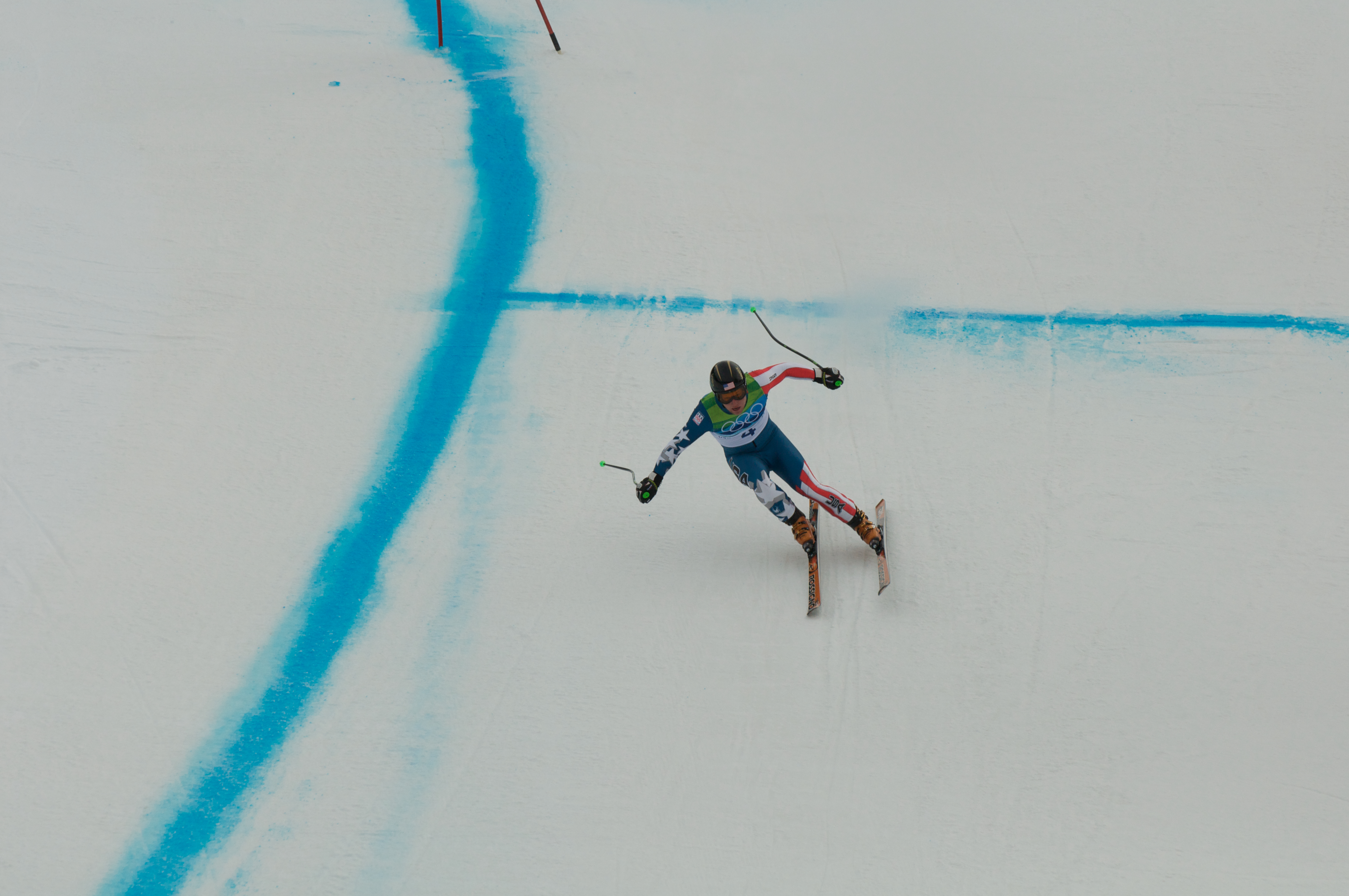
Weibrecht at the 2010 Olympics

Weibrecht made his World Cup debut on November 30, 2006, at Beaver Creek and became a full-time World Cup racer during the 2008 season. He competed in three events in his debut at the World Championships in 2009 in Val d'Isère, earning his best finish of 39th in the super-G event.

At the 2010 Winter Olympics in Vancouver, Weibrecht finished 21st in the downhill at Whistler Creekside. Four days later, Weibrecht won the bronze medal in the super-G.

Weibrecht missed most of the 2011 season due to injuries. After shoulder surgery in the spring, he raced in just five speed events, all before Christmas, and failed to break into the top 30 for World Cup points. While slalom training in late December, he injured the other shoulder and sat out the rest of season, which included the 2011 World Championships.

Weibrecht won the silver medal in the super-G in the 2014 Winter Olympics in Sochi, besting teammate Bode Miller, who tied for the bronze. A surprise medalist, he started 29th at Rosa Khutor and was in the lead at every split, except for the very last. The Los Angeles Times called Weibrecht's dramatic silver medal a "super-giant upset" and said Weibrecht "is only 28 but has had more body work done than a rent-a-wreck."

Weibrecht's best finish at the World Championships is 9th in the downhill in 2015.

Formerly with Rossignol, Weibrecht switched to Head equipment in April 2013.

He announced his retirement from sport at the end of the 2017/18 season.

== World Cup results ==
=== Top ten finishes ===
- 2 podiums - (2 SG)
- 11 top tens – (2 DH, 9 SG)

Season	Date	Location	Discipline	Place
2008	29 Nov 2007	Beaver Creek, USA	Downhill	10
2012	3 Dec 2011	Beaver Creek, USA	Super-G	10
2014	2 Mar 2014	Kvitfjell, Norway	Super-G	7
2015	6 Dec 2014	Beaver Creek, USA	Super-G	10
2015	23 Jan 2015	Kitzbühel, Austria	Super-G	5
2015	8 Mar 2015	Kvitfjell, Norway	Super-G	5
2016	4 Dec 2015	Beaver Creek, USA	Downhill	5
2016	5 Dec 2015	Beaver Creek, USA	Super-G	3
2016	18 Dec 2015	Val Gardena, Italy	Super-G	5
2016	22 Jan 2016	Kitzbühel, Austria	Super-G	2
2016	13 Mar 2016	Kvitfjell, Norway	Super-G	5

=== Season standings ===
Season	Age	Overall	Slalom	Giant slalom	Super-G	Downhill	Combined
2008	22	93	—	—	—	39	38
2009	23	97	—	—	30	42	48
2010	24	54	—	—	23	26	40
2011	25	(168)	injured in December 2010				
2012	26	83	—	—	24	—	—
2013	27	101	—	—	29	—	—
2014	28	68	—	—	22	—	33
2015	29	40	—	—	12	46	26
2016	30	22	—	56	8	22	—
2017	31	87	—	—	27	39	—
2018	32	106	—	—	30	—	—

== World Championship results ==
Year	Age	Slalom	Giant slalom	Super-G	Downhill	Combined
2009	23	—	—	39	DNF	DNS2
2011	25	injured, did not compete				
2013	27	—	—	DNF	22	—
2015	29	—	—	20	9	—
2017	31	—	—	DNF	—	—

== Olympic results ==
Year	Age	Slalom	Giant slalom	Super-G	Downhill	Combined
2010	24	—	—	3	21	11
2014	28	—	—	2	—	DNF2
2018	32	—	—	DNF	—	—

== Personal life ==
Born and raised in Lake Placid, Weibrecht grew up and raced on the challenging slopes of nearby Whiteface Mountain, which hosted the alpine events at the 1980 Winter Olympics. The fourth of five siblings, Weibrecht learned how to be a technical skier through the direction of the New York Ski Educational Foundation (NYSEF) program.

Weibrecht attended Northwood School in Lake Placid, NY, and also The Winter Sports School in Park City, Utah, and graduated in 2003. His nickname is "Warhorse." He attended Dartmouth College in Hanover, New Hampshire, where he was an earth sciences major and has graduated as of 2015. In 2012, he married his longtime girlfriend, Denja Rand of Lake Placid, New York.
