= Peter Dürr =

German alpine skier (born 1960)

Peter Dürr (born 10 February 1960 in Munich) is a German former alpine skier who competed in the 1984 Winter Olympics and 1988 Winter Olympics.

He is the father of alpine skiers Katharina and Lena Dürr.
