= World Junior Alpine Skiing Championships 2006 =

International skiing competition

The World Junior Alpine Skiing Championships 2006 were the 25th World Junior Alpine Skiing Championships, held between 2–7 March 2006 in Mont-Sainte-Anne, Québec, Canada.

== Medal winners ==
=== Men's events ===
| Event | Gold | | Silver | | Bronze | |
|---|---|---|---|---|---|---|
| Downhill | Christopher Beckmann; United States | 1:27.26 | Romed Baumann; Austria | 1:27.55 | Stefan Guay; Canada | 1:27.59 |
| Super-G | Michael Sablatnik; Austria | 1:11.81 | Gašper Markič; Slovenia | 1:11.85 | Andrew Weibrecht; United States | 1:11.87 |
| Giant Slalom | Stefan Guay; Canada | 2:20.50 | Petteri Kantola; Finland | 2:21.21 | Carlo Janka; Switzerland | 2:21.41 |
| Slalom | Mikkel Bjørge; Norway | 1:32.98 | Romed Baumann; Austria | 1:33.14 | Sandro Viletta; Switzerland | 1:33.25 |
| Combined | Romed Baumann; Austria | 15.70 points | Mauro Caviezel; Switzerland | 49.61 | Kryštof Krýzl; Czech Republic | 60.88 |

=== Women's events ===
| Event | Gold | | Silver | | Bronze | |
|---|---|---|---|---|---|---|
| Downhill | Marianne Abderhalden; Switzerland | 1:13.51 | Anna Fenninger; Austria | 1:13.61 | Aurélie Revillet; France | 1:14.18 |
| Super-G | Anna Fenninger; Austria | 1:10.96 | Camilla Borsotti; Italy | 1:11.78 | Hilary Longhini; Italy | 1:11.89 |
| Giant Slalom | Tina Weirather; Liechtenstein | 2:22.43 | Carolin Fernsebner; Germany | 2:23.72 | Eva-Maria Brem; Austria | 2:23.76 |
| Slalom | Maria Pietilä Holmner; Sweden | 1:37.30 | Katrin Triendl; Austria | 1:37.98 | Nina Løseth; Norway | 1:38.76 |
| Combined | Anna Fenninger; Austria | 24.49 points | Marianne Abderhalden; Switzerland | 57.07 | Nina Løseth; Norway | 62.02 |
