= Alexandra Daum =

Austrian alpine skier (born 1986)

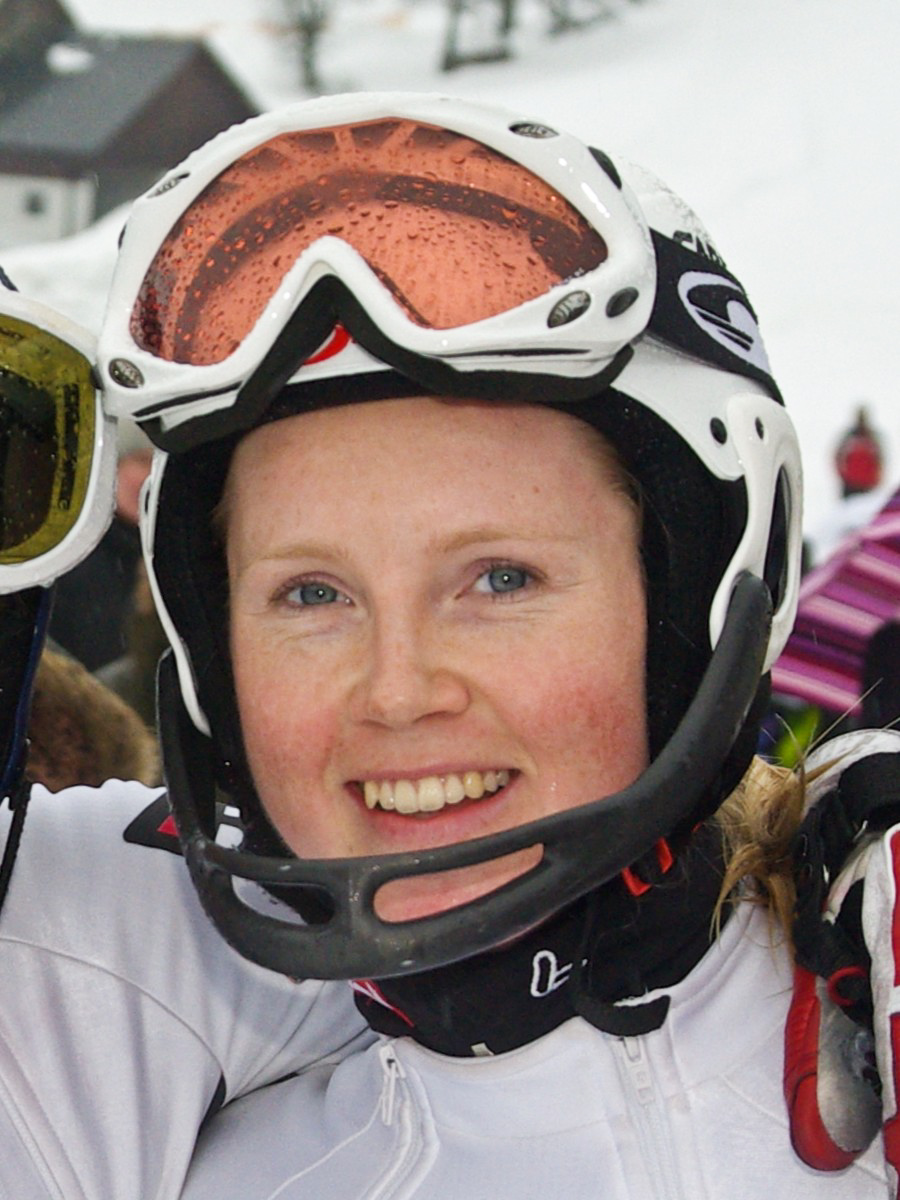
Austrian alpine skier Alexandra Daum at the Austrian Championships 2009 in Lackenhof.

Alexandra Daum (born 1986) is a retired Austrian alpine skier.

She recorded a 13th place at the 2006 Junior World Championships and a 5th place at the 2007 Winter Universiade.

She made her World Cup debut in December 2008 in La Molina. She collected her first World Cup points with a 24th place in January 2009 in Garmisch-Partenkirchen, also improving to 11th in Ofterschwang before the end of the 2008–09 season. Exclusively a slalom racer, her career World Cup best was a 9th place from November 2012 in Levi. Her last World Cup outing was a 26th place in March 2015 in Åre.

She represented the sports club SV Aschau im Zillertal.
