= Karin Hackl =

Austrian alpine skier

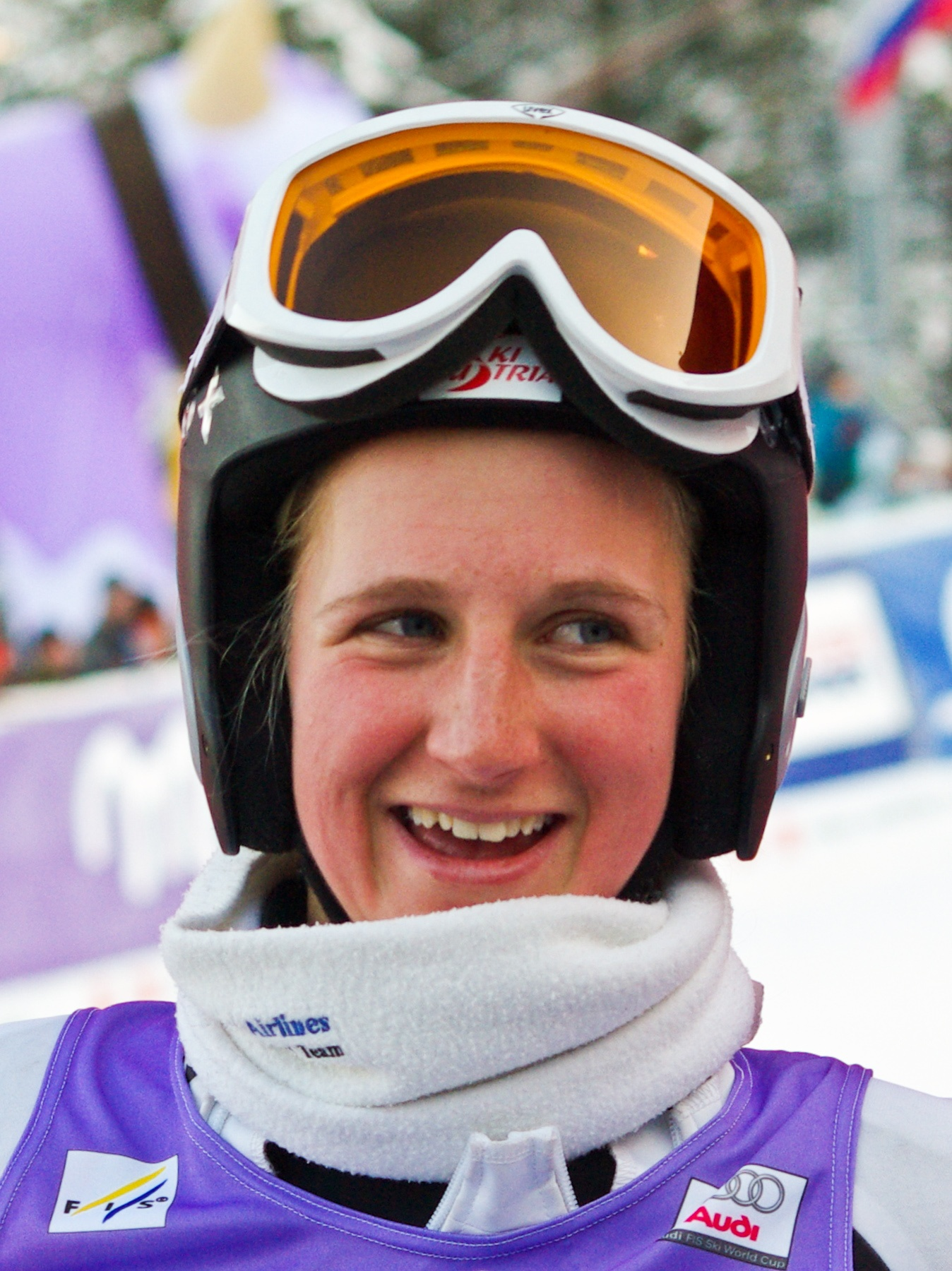

Personal information
- Born: 14 June 1989 (age 37) Admont, Austria

Skiing career
- Sport: Alpine skiing
- Club: Asvoe SK Admont
- Retired: 2012
- Disciplines: Technical events
- World Cup debut: 2008

World Cup
- Seasons: 3
- Podiums: 0
Medal record
Men's alpine skiing
Representing Austria
World Junior Championships
Silver medal – second place	2009 Garmisch-Partenkirchen	Combined
Bronze medal – third place	2009 Garmisch-Partenkirchen	Giant slalom

Karin Hackl (born 14 June 1989) is an Austrian former alpine skier winner of the Europa Cup overall title in 2009.

== Career ==
In her career she has won two medals at youth level at the World Junior Alpine Skiing Championships 2009. She retired from alpine skiing in 2012 and from 2013 competed one year also in the FIS Freestyle Ski World Cup.

== Europa Cup results ==
Hackl has won an overall Europa Cup and one specialty standings.

- FIS Alpine Ski Europa Cup
  - Overall: 2009
  - Giant slalom: 2009
