= Katharina Dürr =

German alpine skier (born 1989)

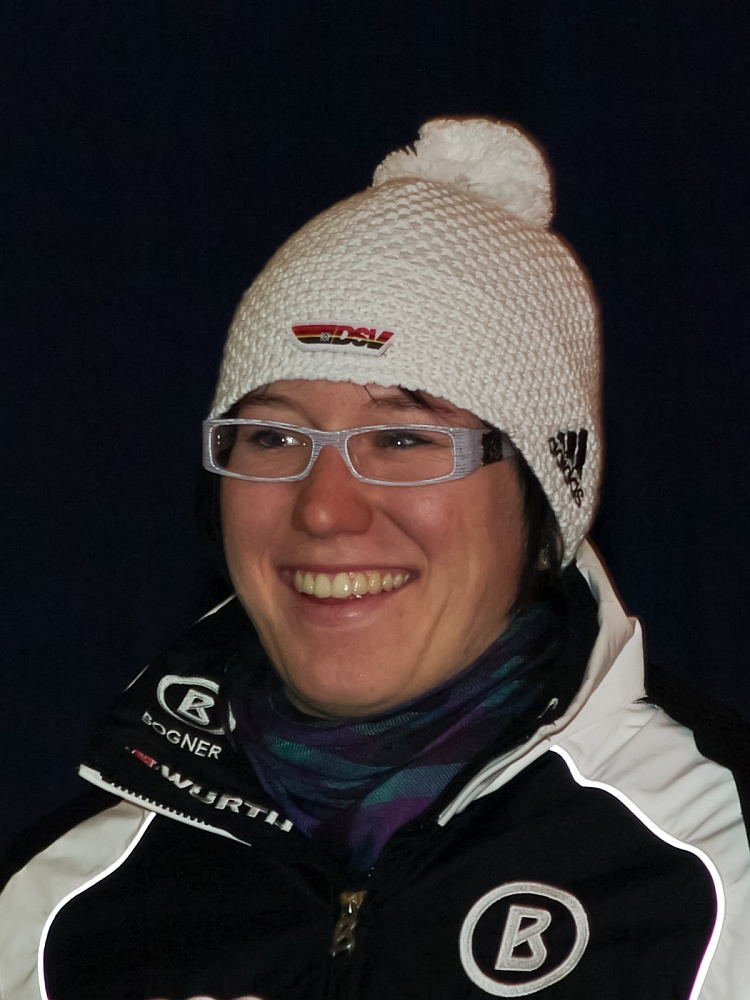
German alpine skier Katharina Dürr at the bib draw for the Slalom in Semmering (Austria) on 29 December 2010

Katharina Dürr (born 1989) is a retired German alpine skier.

She competed at the 2007, 2008 and 2009 Junior World Championships, only in the slalom. The highlight was winning the silver medal in 2007. She finished 23rd in the slalom at the 2011 World Championships.

She made her World Cup debut in December 2007 in Lienz, also collecting her first World Cup points with a 26th place. Already the next week she improved to 11th place in Špindlerův Mlýn. Almost exclusively a slalom racer, in the 2009–10 season she improved further to 7th, 5th and 9th places in Levi, Flachau and Garmisch-Partenkirchen respectively. This was her pinnacle season, and her last World Cup outing came in November 2012 in Levi.

She represented the sports club SV Germering. She is a daughter of Peter Dürr and sister of Lena Dürr.
