= Florian Scheiber =

Austrian alpine skier

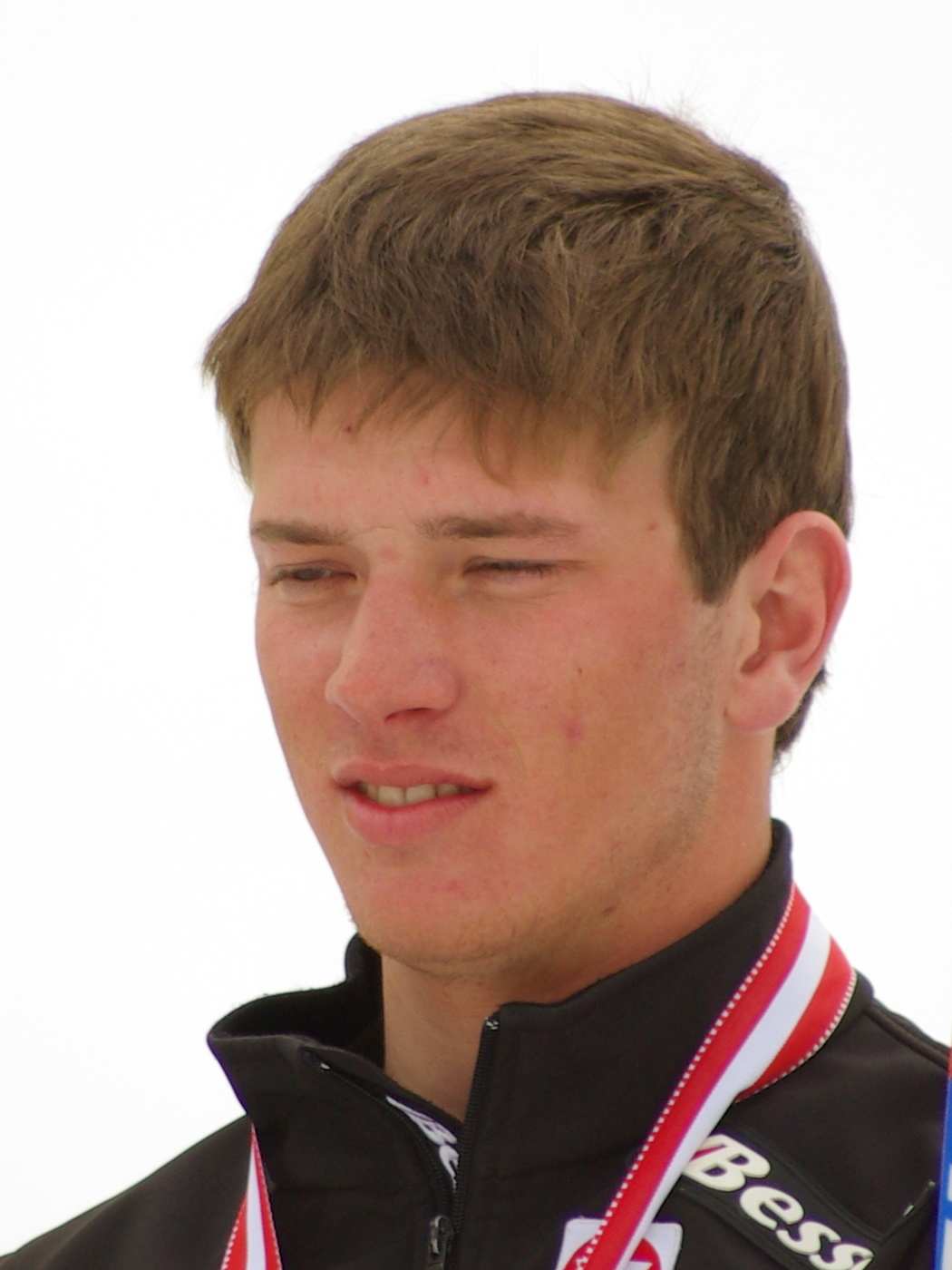

Personal information
- Born: 17 May 1987 (age 39) Sölden, Austria

Skiing career
- Sport: Alpine skiing
- Club: Skiklub Sölden-Hochsölden
- Retired: 2016
- Disciplines: Speed events
- World Cup debut: 2009

World Cup
- Seasons: 8
- Podiums: 0
Medal record
Men's alpine skiing
Representing Austria
World Junior Championships
Silver medal – second place	2005 Bardonecchia	Giant slalom
Bronze medal – third place	2005 Bardonecchia	Combined

Florian Scheiber (born 17 May 1987) is an Austrian former alpine skier two-time winner of the Europa Cup overall title in 2009 and 2012.

== Career ==
In his career he has started in 56 World Cup races in eight seasons, obtaining a 4th place in downhill as his best result, he retired at just 28 years old following yet another serious injury he had on Kitzbühel's Streif in a timed race of the World Cup.

== World Cup results ==
Top 10

Date	Place	Discipline	Rank
30 November 2012	(United States) Beaver Creek	Downhill	4

== Europa Cup results ==
Scheiber has won two overall Europa Cup and one specialty standings.

- FIS Alpine Ski Europa Cup
  - Overall: 2009, 2012
  - Super-G: 2012
