= FIS Alpine World Ski Championships 2013 – Women's downhill =

Women's downhill at the FIS Alpine World Ski Championships 2013
- Venue: Planai; Schladming, Austria
- Date: 10 February 2013
- Competitors: 41 from 20 nations
- Winning time: 1:50.00

Medalists
gold medal	Marion Rolland	France
silver medal	Nadia Fanchini	Italy
bronze medal	Maria Höfl-Riesch	Germany

The Women's downhill competition at the 2013 World Championships was held on Sunday, February 10. 41 athletes from 20 nations competed.

== Results ==
The race was started at 11:00 local time (UTC+1).

Rank	Bib	Name	Country	Time	Difference
1st place, gold medalist(s)	22	Marion Rolland	France	1:50.00	—
2nd place, silver medalist(s)	2	Nadia Fanchini	Italy	1:50.16	+0.16
3rd place, bronze medalist(s)	16	Maria Höfl-Riesch	Germany	1:50.70	+0.70
4	15	Nadja Kamer	Switzerland	1:50.74	+0.74
5	17	Julia Mancuso	United States	1:50.85	+0.85
6	19	Stacey Cook	United States	1:50.91	+0.91
7	20	Tina Maze	Slovenia	1:51.21	+1.21
8	4	Andrea Fischbacher	Austria	1:51.23	+1.23
9	24	Elena Fanchini	Italy	1:51.45	+1.45
10	13	Elisabeth Görgl	Austria	1:51.48	+1.48
11	10	Anna Fenninger	Austria	1:51.55	+1.55
12	8	Leanne Smith	United States	1:51.58	+1.58
13	21	Tina Weirather	Liechtenstein	1:51.71	+1.71
14	14	Marie Marchand-Arvier	France	1:51.74	+1.74
15	27	Carolina Ruiz Castillo	Spain	1:51.93	+1.93
16	11	Lara Gut	Switzerland	1:51.96	+1.96
17	12	Alice McKennis	United States	1:52.03	+2.03
18	23	Regina Sterz	Austria	1:52.05	+2.05
19	7	Ilka Štuhec	Slovenia	1:52.16	+2.16
20	30	Marianne Kaufmann-Abderhalden	Switzerland	1:52.32	+2.32
21	25	Lotte Smiseth Sejersted	Norway	1:52.36	+2.36
22	6	Sofia Goggia	Italy	1:52.85	+2.85
23	28	Edit Miklós	Hungary	1:53.25	+3.25
24	26	Klára Křížová	Czech Republic	1:53.26	+3.26
25	1	Vanja Brodnik	Slovenia	1:53.37	+3.37
26	36	Sara Hector	Sweden	1:53.38	+3.38
27	32	Ragnhild Mowinckel	Norway	1:53.67	+3.67
28	34	Larisa Yurkiw	Canada	1:53.69	+3.69
29	29	Alexandra Coletti	Monaco	1:54.01	+4.01
30	37	Elena Yakovishina	Russia	1:54.93	+4.93
31	31	Anastasia Kedrina	Russia	1:55.03	+5.03
32	35	Maria Bedareva	Russia	1:55.91	+5.91
33	38	Greta Small	Australia	1:56.12	+6.12
34	33	Aleksandra Prokopyeva	Russia	1:56.72	+6.72
35	41	Isabel van Buynder	Belgium	1:57.31	+7.31
36	40	Andrea Komšić	Croatia	1:59.53	+9.53
	39	Maria Kirkova	Bulgaria	DNS	
	3	Stefanie Moser	Austria	DNF	
	5	Veronique Hronek	Germany	DNF	
	9	Dominique Gisin	Switzerland	DNF	
	18	Daniela Merighetti	Italy	DNF	
