= Anton Lahdenperä =

Swedish alpine skier (born 1985)

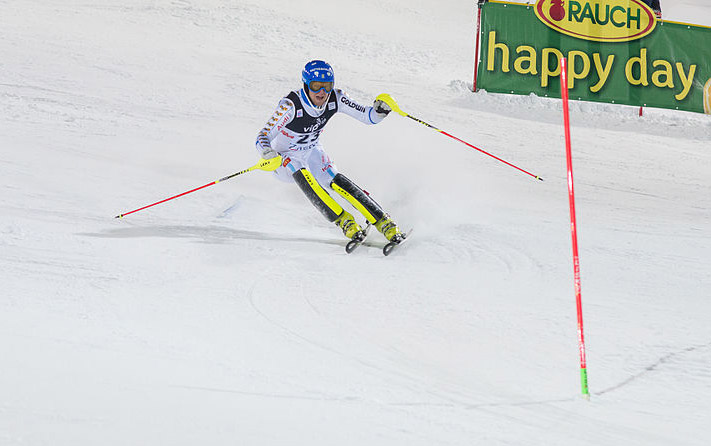
Anton Lahdenperä

Anton Lahdenperä is a Swedish alpine skier. (born 19 March 1985)

Lahdenperä was born in Gällivare, Sweden. He is one of the golden 1985 vintage, which also included Mattias Hargin and Jens Byggmark. He skis in the alpine World Cup circuit, mainly slalom. He made his debut in the Wengen slalom during the 2004/2005 season. His best performance so far came in his third World Cup start, in Beaver Creek, December 2006, when he was placed 9th.

Lahdenperä won the overall Europa-cup slalom in the 2009/10 season. He has also won the National Championship in Giant Slalom in 2004, the National Championship in Slalom in Are in 2006 and the Super Combined in 2007.
