= Lena Dürr =

German alpine skier (born 1991)

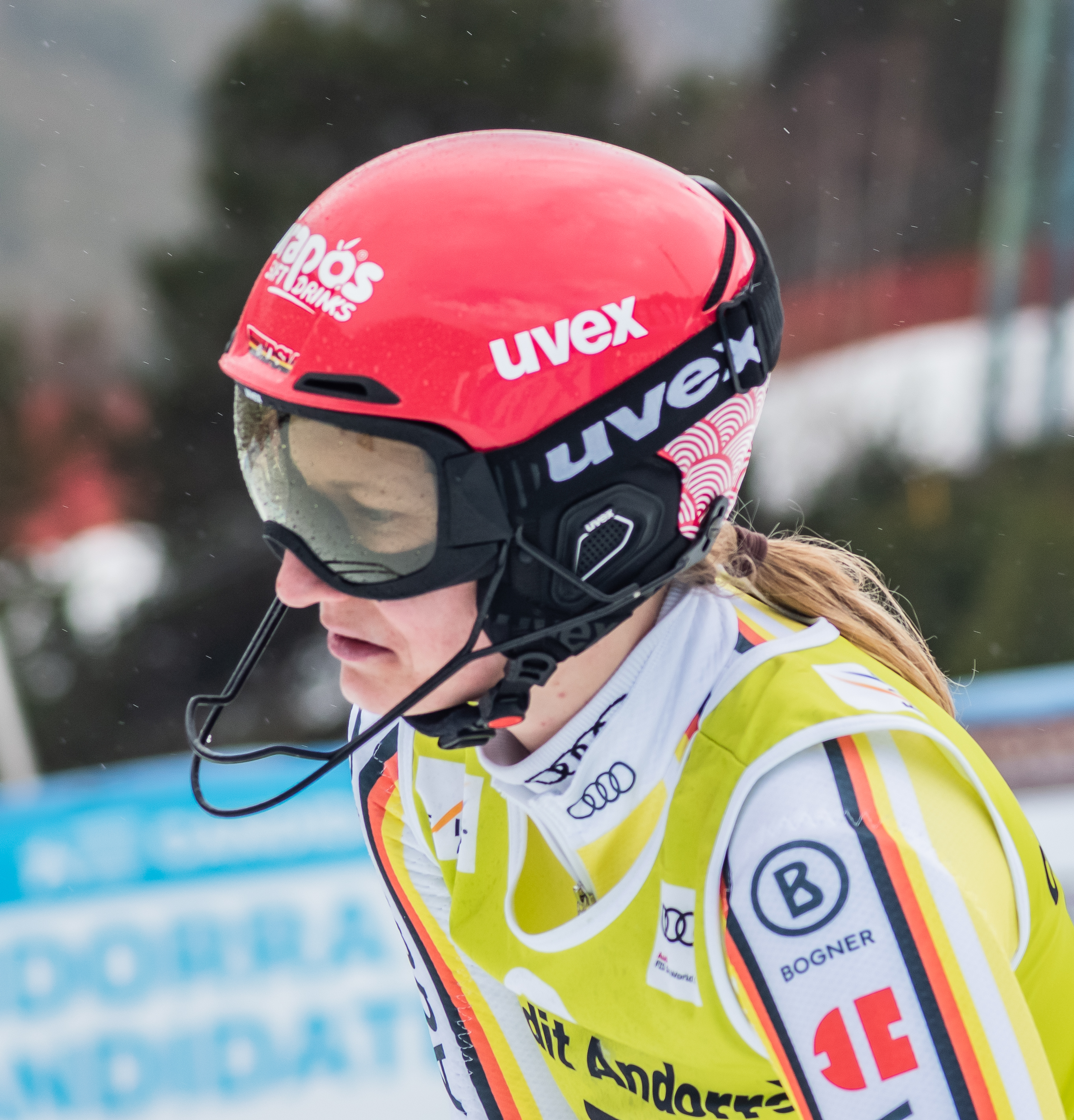
- At Soldeu in March 2023

Personal information
- Born: 4 August 1991 (age 34) Munich, Bavaria, Germany
- Height: 1.73 m (5 ft 8 in)
- Parent: Peter Dürr (father)
- Family: Katharina Dürr (sister)

Skiing career
- Country: Germany
- Sport: Alpine skiing
- Club: SV Germering
- Disciplines: Slalom, Giant slalom
- World Cup debut: 15 February 2008 (age 16)

Olympics
- Teams: 3 – (2018, 2022, 2026)
- Medals: 1 (0 gold)

World Championships
- Teams: 8 – (2011–2025)
- Medals: 3 (0 gold)

World Cup
- Seasons: 18 – (2008, 2010–2026)
- Wins: 2 – (1 SL, 1 CE)
- Podiums: 18 – (17 SL, 1 CE)
- Overall titles: 0 – (13th in 2025)
- Discipline titles: 0 – (2nd in SL, 2024)
Medal record
Women's alpine skiing
Representing Germany
International alpine ski competitions
Event	1st	2nd	3rd
Olympic Games	0	1	0
World Championships	0	0	3
Total	0	1	3
Olympic Games
Silver medal – second place	2022 Beijing	Team event
World Championships
Bronze medal – third place	2013 Schladming	Team event
Bronze medal – third place	2021 Cortina d’Ampezzo	Team event
Bronze medal – third place	2023 Méribel	Slalom
Junior World Championships
Silver medal – second place	2010 Mont Blanc	Giant slalom

Lena Dürr (born 4 August 1991) is a German World Cup alpine ski racer and specializes in slalom.

== Career ==
Dürr made her World Cup debut in February 2008. She has two World Cup wins; the first was also her first podium, a parallel slalom in 2013. It was a City Event race in Moscow, Russia, on 29 January, where she came as a reserve. Her second win came exactly a decade later in a slalom at Špindlerův Mlýn, Czech Republic, where she edged out runner-up Mikaela Shiffrin. The two had switched positions on the podium in a slalom the previous day. Dürr won the bronze medal in slalom at the 2023 World Championships.

== Personal life ==
Dürr was born in Munich and raised nearby Germering. Both her sister Katharina Dürr and father Peter Dürr were professional alpine ski racers.

== World Cup results ==
=== Season standings ===
Season
Season	Age	Overall	Slalom	Giant slalom	Super-G	Downhill	Combined	Parallel
2010	18	88	49	32	—	—	—	—N/a
2011	19	69	44	24	—	—	—	—N/a
2012	20	28	12	23	—	—	32	—N/a
2013	21	24	11	34	33	—	10	—N/a
2014	22	90	35	—	—	—	—	—N/a
2015	23	55	21	—	—	—	—	—N/a
2016	24	62	22	43	—	—	—	—N/a
2017	25	42	19	42	49	—	18	—N/a
2018	26	51	18	—	—	—	—	—N/a
2019	27	51	16	—	—	—	—	—N/a
2020	28	50	15	35	—	—	—	27
2021	29	27	6	—	—	—	—N/a	22
2022	30	17	3rd place, bronze medalist(s)	—	—	—	—N/a	7
2023	31	17	4	—	—	—	—N/a	—N/a
2024	32	16	2nd place, silver medalist(s)	46	—	—	—N/a	—N/a
2025	33	13	5	25	—	—	—N/a	—N/a
2026	34	21	9	16	—	—	—N/a	—N/a

=== Race podiums ===
- 2 wins – (1 SL, 1 CE)
- 18 podiums – (17 SL, 1 CE), 62 top tens

Season
Season	Date	Location	Discipline	Place
2013	29 January 2013	Moscow, Russia	City event	1st
2022	20 November 2021	Levi, Finland	Slalom	3rd
2022	21 November 2021	Levi, Finland	Slalom	3rd
2022	10 January 2022	Schladming, Austria	Slalom	3rd
2022	19 March 2022	Méribel, France	Slalom	2nd
2023	29 December 2022	Semmering, Austria	Slalom	3rd
2023	10 January 2023	Flachau, Austria	Slalom	3rd
2023	28 January 2023	(Czech Republic) Špindlerův Mlýn, Czech Republic	Slalom	2nd
2023	29 January 2023	(Czech Republic) Špindlerův Mlýn, Czech Republic	Slalom	1st
2024	11 November 2023	Levi, Finland	Slalom	2nd
2024	12 November 2023	Levi, Finland	Slalom	3rd
2024	29 December 2023	Lienz, Austria	Slalom	2nd
2024	7 January 2024	Kranjska Gora, Slovenia	Slalom	2nd
2025	16 November 2024	Levi, Finland	Slalom	3rd
2025	29 December 2024	Semmering, Austria	Slalom	2nd
2025	30 January 2025	Courchevel, France	Slalom	3rd
2025	27 March 2025	Sun Valley, United States	Slalom	2nd
2026	30 November 2025	Copper Mountain, United States	Slalom	2nd

== World Championship results ==
Year
Year	Age	Slalom	Giant slalom	Super-G	Downhill	Combined	Team combined	Parallel	Team event
2011	19	—	18	—	—	—	—N/a	—N/a	5
2013	21	21	DNS2	30	—	—	—N/a	—N/a	3
2015	23	13	—	—	—	—	—N/a	—N/a	9
2017	25	18	26	—	—	—	—N/a	—N/a	9
2019	27	11	—	—	—	—	—N/a	—N/a	4
2021	29	14	—	—	—	—	—N/a	27	3
2023	31	3	—	—	—	—	—N/a	6	6
2025	33	8	9	—	—	—N/a	17	—N/a	5

== Olympic results ==
Year
Year	Age	Slalom	Giant slalom	Super-G	Downhill	Combined	Team combined	Team event
2018	26	DNF1	—	—	—	—	—N/a	5
2022	30	4	—	—	—	—	—N/a	2
2026	34	DNF2	9	—	—	—N/a	—	—N/a
