= Monte Pora =

Mountain in Italy

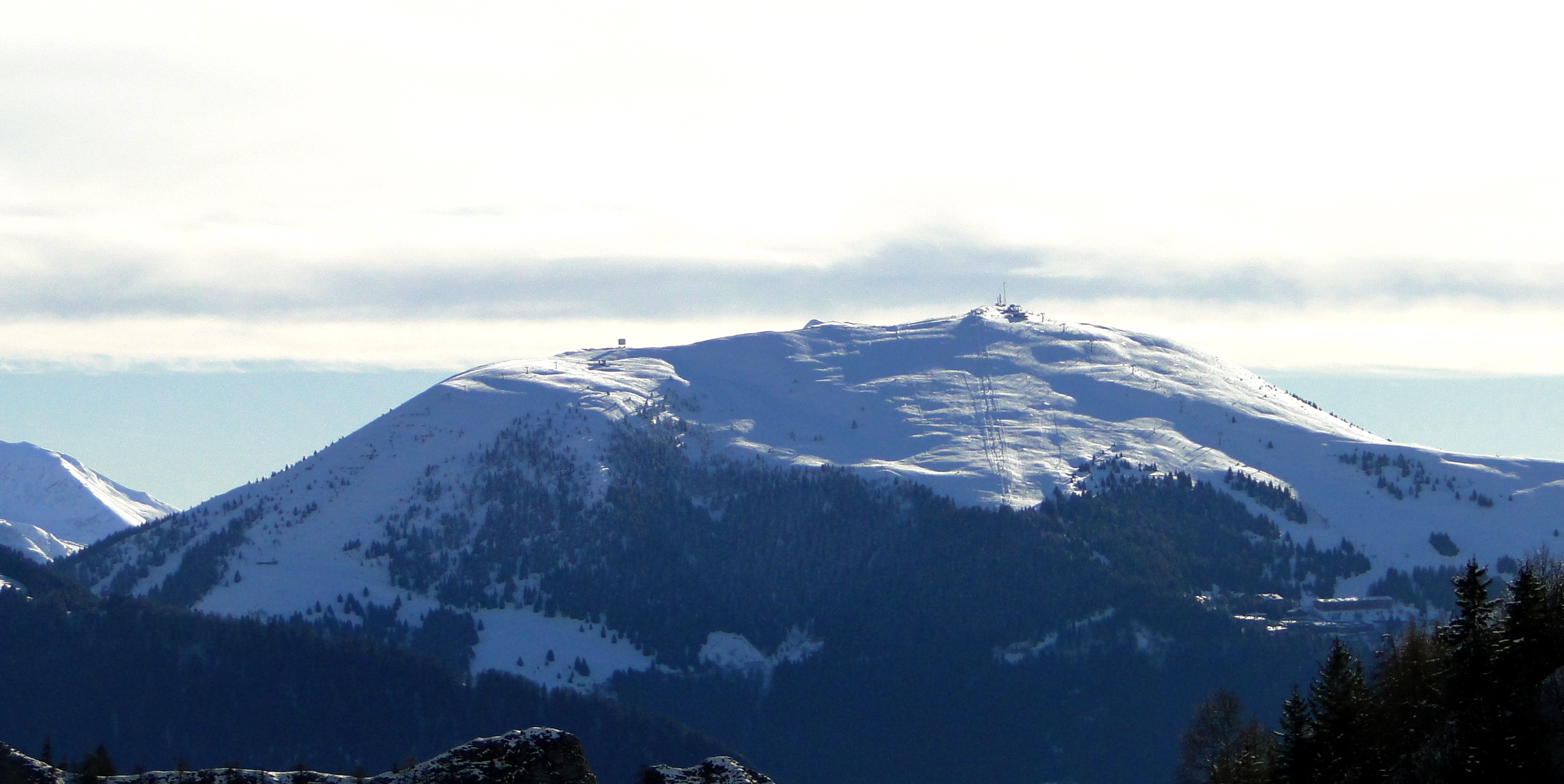
- Winter view

Highest point
- Elevation: 1,880 m (6,170 ft)
- Coordinates: 45°53′03″N 10°06′39″E

Geography
- Location within Alps
- Location: Lombardy, Italy
- Parent range: Bergamasque Prealps

Monte Pora is a mountain of Lombardy, Italy. It is located within the Bergamasque Prealps (a sub-range of Bergamo Alps).

== Winter sports ==
A ski resort on the mountain offers a total 21 km of Piste ranging from 1370 to 1880 metres of elevation.
