= Lene Løseth =

Norwegian alpine skier (born 1986)

Lene Løseth (born 26 November 1986, in Ålesund) is a Norwegian alpine skier who races for Spjelkavik IL.

At the WC 2007 in Åre she came 38th in the giant slalom and 23rd in the slalom.

She is Mona and Nina Løseth's elder sister. In a World Cup competition in slalom in Flachau in January 2010 all three sisters qualified for the final.
