= Alexander Ploner =

Italian alpine skier (born 1978)

Alexander Ploner (born 10 July 1978 in Bruneck) is an alpine skier and police officer. He represented Italy at the 2010 Winter Olympics. In giant slalom, he posted the third time in the first run, bud did not finish the second run.
