= Marc Gisin =

Swiss alpine skier

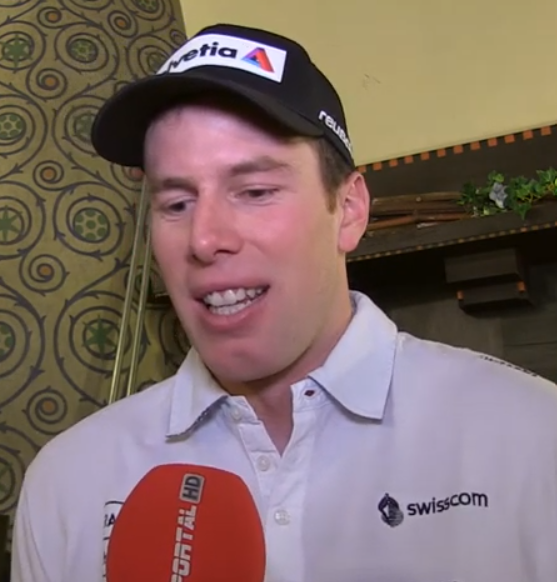
- Gisin in 2015

Personal information
- Born: 25 June 1988 (age 38) Visp, Switzerland
- Height: 1.98 m (6 ft 6 in)

Skiing career
- Sport: Alpine skiing
- Club: SC Engelberg, Engelberg
- Retired: 2020
- Disciplines: Speed events
- World Cup debut: 2004

World Cup
- Seasons: 17

Marc Gisin (born 25 June 1988) is a Swiss former alpine skier. He competed in the 2018 Winter Olympics.

== Career ==
Gisin represented Switzerland in the FIS ski championships. Gisin's best results in the FIS World Cup came at Kitzbuhel in 2016 and 2018 where he finished in 5th position on both occasions. In the FIS European Cup, he won on three occasions at Madonna di Campiglio, Les Orres and Crans Montana.

Gisin competed in the 2018 Winter Olympics. He finished in 21st position in the Men's Downhill race.

During his career, Gisin suffered major injuries in crashes. At Crans Montana in 2012, Gisin suffered a torn anterior cruciate ligament and then in January 2015 at Kitzbuhel left him with a concussion and bleeding on the brain after an accident during the Mens Super-G race. In 2018, Gisin was involved in an accident at Val Gardena during the Mens Downhill race. He crashed following a jump, and was airlifted to hospital. Gisin was placed in a medical coma after the crash. He suffered bruising on the brain, a fractured pelvis and four fractured ribs. In 2020, Gisin announced his retirement from ski racing.

== Personal life ==
Gisin is the brother of alpine skiers Dominique Gisin and Michelle Gisin. During his career, Gisin was an athlete supported by Rossignol.

== World Cup results ==
Top 10

Date	Place	Discipline	Rank
20-01-2018	(Austria) Kitzbuehel	Downhill	5
23-01-2016	(Austria) Kitzbuehel	Downhill	5
15-01-2016	Switzerland Wengen	Alpine combined	6
