= Michael Gufler =

Italian alpine skier

Personal information
- Born: 24 March 1979 (age 47) Merano, Italy

Skiing career
- Sport: Alpine skiing
- Retired: 2012
- Disciplines: Speed events and giant slalom
- World Cup debut: 2002

World Cup
- Seasons: 11
- Podiums: 0

Michael Gufler (born 24 March 1979) is a former Italian alpine skier who won the Europa Cup overall title in 2006.

== Biography ==
His best result in the world cup was a 10th place in giant slalom. After his skiing career he began his career as a coach, in the 2022-23 world cup season he is at the starting line as a technician for the Italian national alpine ski team.

== World Cup results ==
Top 10

Date	Place	Discipline	Rank
01-03-2003	(South Korea) Yongpyong	Giant slalom	10

== Europa Cup results ==
Gufler has won an overall Europa Cup and one discipline cup.

- FIS Alpine Ski Europa Cup
  - Overall: 2006
  - Giant slalom: 2006
