= Christian Spescha =

Swiss alpine skier (born 1989)

Personal information
- Born: 25 January 1989 (age 37) Obersaxen, Switzerland

Skiing career
- Sport: Alpine skiing
- Retired: 2014
- Disciplines: Speed events
- World Cup debut: 2007

World Cup
- Seasons: 8

Christian Spescha (born 25 January 1989) is a former Swiss alpine skier who won a FIS Alpine Ski Europa Cup in 2010.

== Europa Cup results ==
Spescha has won an overall Europa Cup.

- FIS Alpine Ski Europa Cup
  - Overall: 2010
