= World Junior Alpine Skiing Championships 2009 =

International skiing competition

The World Junior Alpine Skiing Championships 2009 were the 28th World Junior Alpine Skiing Championships, held between 29 February and 8 March 2009 in Garmisch-Partenkirchen, Germany.

== Medal winners ==
=== Men's events ===
Event	Gold		Silver		Bronze	
Downhill	Andy Plank; Italy	1:39.06	Dominik Paris; Italy	1:39.18	Andreas Romar; Finland	1:39.32
Super-G	Manuel Kramer; Austria	1:16.64	Marcel Hirscher; Austria	1:17.05	Mattia Casse; Italy	1:17.18
Giant Slalom	Alexis Pinturault; France	2:18.49	Björn Sieber; Austria	2:18.95	Marcel Hirscher; Austria	2:19.17
Slalom	Jesper Riis-Johannessen; Norway	1:20.78	Tommy Ford; United States	1:21.29	Nolan Kasper; United States	1:21.32
Combined	Sepp Gerber; Switzerland	58.23 points	Dominik Paris; Italy	58.64	Giovanni Borsotti; Italy	63.90

=== Women's events ===
Event	Gold		Silver		Bronze	
Downhill	Marine Gauthier; France	1:19.60	Lotte Smiseth Sejersted; Norway	1:20.08	Nicole Schmidhofer; Austria	1:20.14
Super-G	Viktoria Rebensburg; Germany	1:19.80	Mariella Voglreiter; Austria	1:20.88	Anna Fenninger; Austria	1:20.91
Giant Slalom	Viktoria Rebensburg; Germany	2:45.81	Tina Weirather; Liechtenstein	2:47.29	Karin Hackl; Austria	2:47.31
Slalom	Denise Feierabend; Switzerland	1:42.07	Bernadette Schild; Austria	1:42.83	Nina Løseth; Norway	1:43.01
Combined	Federica Brignone; Italy	54.00 points	Karin Hackl; Austria	66.69	Elena Curtoni; Italy	95.09
