= Mona Løseth =

Norwegian alpine skier (born 1991)

Personal information
- Born: 11 April 1991 (age 35) Ålesund, Norway
- Height: 172.5 cm (5 ft 7.9 in)

Skiing career
- Sport: Alpine skiing
- Club: Spjelkavik IL
- Disciplines: Slalom, giant slalom
- World Cup debut: 4 January 2009 (age 17)

Olympics
- Teams: 2 (2010, 2014)

World Championships
- Teams: 2 (2009, 2013)

World Cup
- Seasons: 4
- Wins: 0
- Podiums: 0
- Overall titles: 0 – (75th in 2010)

Mona Løseth (born 11 April 1991) is a Norwegian alpine skier. She was giant slalom Junior World Champion in 2010. Her elder sisters Lene and Nina are also alpine skiers at international level. In a World Cup competition in slalom in Flachau in January 2010 all three sisters qualified for the final.

She represented Norway at the 2010 and 2014 Winter Olympics.
