= Hailey Duke =

American alpine skier (born 1985)

Hailey Duke (born September 17, 1985, in Sun Valley, Idaho) is an alpine skier who skied for the United States at the 2010 Winter Olympics. Her original athletic interest was taekwondo, but she later began focusing more on ski racing in her teens. She won silver at the U.S. national slalom and has had four slalom podiums on the Europa Cup. Her father, Larry Duke, is a ski instructor and taekwondo teacher.
