= Stephan Keppler =

German alpine skier (born 1983)

Stephan Keppler (born February 1, 1983, in Innsbruck) is a German alpine skier.

Keppler grew up in Albstadt, a town on the Swabian Alb, in Baden-Württemberg. He learned skiing at his local winter sports club, WSV, of Ebingen. As an adult, he joined the Bundeswehr, the German military, as an army-sponsored athlete (German: "Sportsoldat").

In 1999, he took part in his first FIS races. In the same season, he won the German youth championship in the slalom, in 2003 in the giant slalom and Super G competitions.

Since 2003, Keppler has been starting in races of the FIS Alpine Ski World Cup, with his debut at Garmisch on February 22. At the same location, he earned his first points in that competition in 2006, finishing 21st in the downhill. In that same year, he won the German championship in downhill and Super G; this success was followed up by the same title in the Super G in 2007.

Keppler took part in the FIS Alpine World Ski Championships 2007 in Åre, but could not reach any satisfying result there. In the following FIS Alpine World Ski Championships 2009 in Val-d’Isère he could improve his performances, with results in the top 20 in the downhill and Alpine skiing combined competitions.

He represented Germany at the 2010 Winter Olympics in Vancouver. In the downhill event he finished 24th and in Super-G could not finish the course.

His biggest success so far came early in the 2010/11 World Cup season, when he came in 2nd, only beaten by Michael Walchhofer, in the Super G at Gröden/Val Gardena, South Tyrol, on December 17, 2010. Overall, he has reached the top 10 four times in his World Cup career.
