= Stefanie Köhle =

Austrian alpine skier (born 1986)

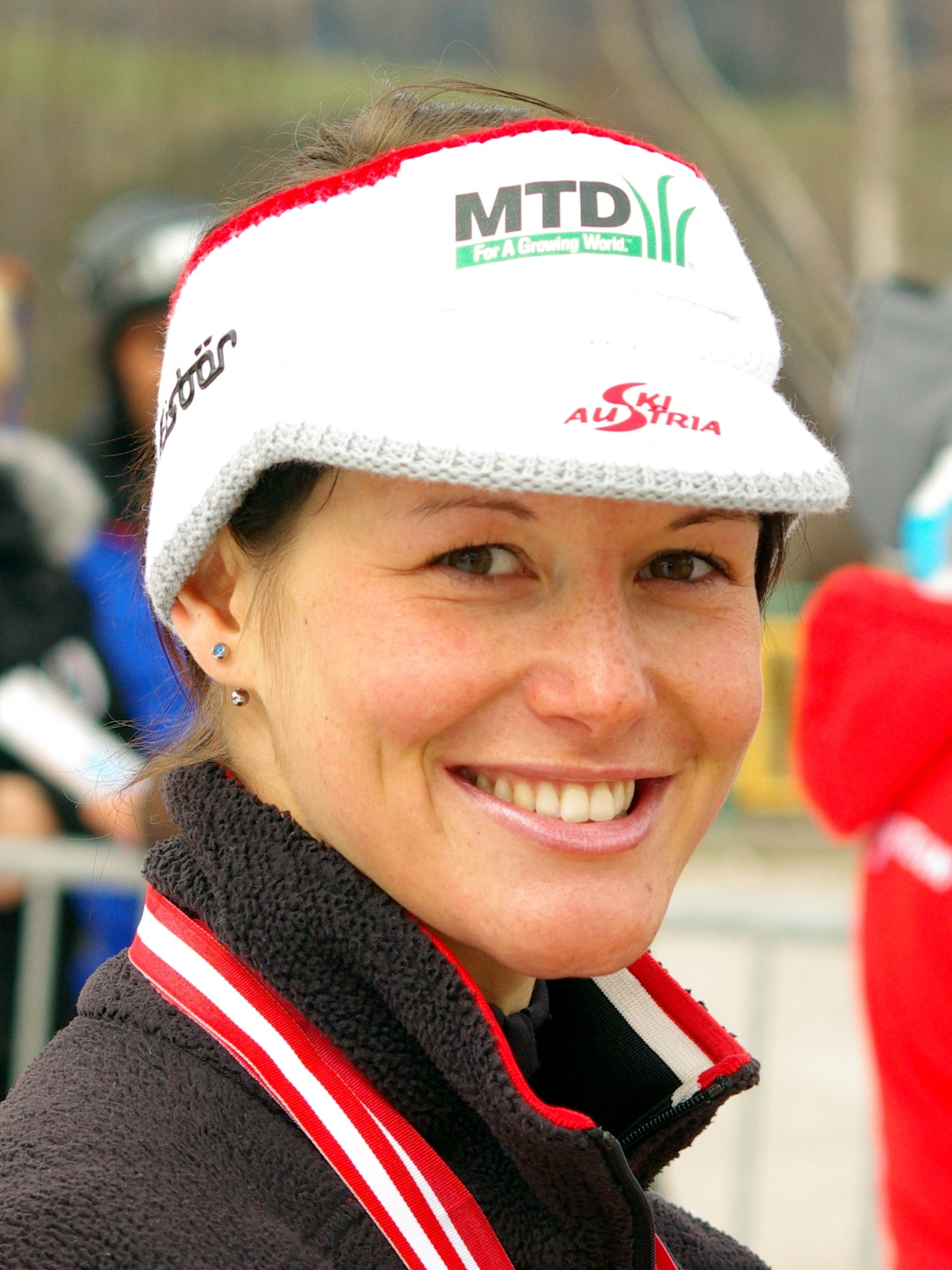
- Köhle in 2008

Personal information
- Born: 6 June 1986 (age 40) Zams, Tyrol, Austria
- Height: 1.61 m (5 ft 3 in)

Skiing career
- Sport: Alpine skiing
- Club: SK Fliess – Tirol
- Retired: April 2014 (age 27)
- Disciplines: Giant slalom, super-G
- World Cup debut: October 2007 (age 21)

Olympics
- Teams: 0

World Championships
- Teams: 0

World Cup
- Seasons: 7 – (2008–2014)
- Wins: 0
- Podiums: 1 – (1 GS)
- Overall titles: 0 – (35th in 2012)
- Discipline titles: 0 – (11th in GS, 2012)

Stefanie Köhle (born 6 June 1986) is a former World Cup alpine ski racer from Austria.

Born in Zams, Tyrol, Köhle made her World Cup debut in Sölden in October 2007 and attained her first podium in October 2012 in Giant slalom, also at Sölden. She retired from competition in April 2014.

== World Cup results ==
=== Season standings ===
Season	Age	Overall	Slalom	Giant slalom	Super-G	Downhill	Combined
2008	21	116	—	47	—	—	—
2009	22	45	—	21	32	42	18
2010	23	69	—	22	16	—	45
2011	24	74	—	23	—	—	42
2012	25	35	—	11	31	—	—
2013	26	35	—	13	25	—	—
2014	27	76	—	49	26	—	—

=== Race podiums ===
- 1 podium – (1 GS)

Season	Date	Location	Discipline	Place
2013	27 Oct 2012	Sölden, Austria	Giant slalom	3rd
