= Spjelkavik IL =

Norwegian sports club

Coordinates: 62.46116°N 6.383784°E

Spjelkavik
- Full name: Spjelkavik Idrettslag
- Nickname: Vika
- Founded: 18 March 1932; 93 years ago
- Ground: Spjelkavik stadion, Ålesund
- Chairman: Perry Holen
- Manager: Kenneth Moldskred, Spjelkavik IL Fotball
- League: 3. divisjon
- 2024: 3. divisjon Group 5, 9th of 14

Spjelkavik IL is a Norwegian sports club from the neighborhood Spjelkavik in Ålesund. It has sections for football, handball and skiing, and was founded on 18 March 1932.

Alpine skiers Mona and Nina Løseth represent the club.

The women's football team last played in the top division in 1992. Ann Kristin Aarønes was the top goalscorer during this heyday for the club. Spjelkavik IL currently doesn't have a senior team for women. The men's team currently resides in the 3. divisjon (fourth tier), having last played in the 2. divisjon in 2002. Notable former players include Tor Hogne Aarøy.
