= Gašper Markič =

Slovenian alpine skier (born 1986)

Personal information
- Born: August 22, 1986 (age 39) Kranj, Slovenia

Skiing career
- Sport: Alpine skiing
- Club: KRG - ASK Kranjska Gora
- Disciplines: Downhill, Super-G, Combined
- World Cup debut: January 16, 2009

World Cup
- Seasons: 4

Gašper Markič (born August 22, 1986, in Kranj) is a former Slovenian alpine skier.

At 2006 FIS Junior World Ski Championships he won a silver Super-G medal in Le Massif, Canada. His 2009 World Cup debut performance was in Wengen, Switzerland. He also competed in Downhill at FIS Alpine World Ski Championships 2011.
