= Barbara Wirth =

German alpine ski racer (born 1989)

Personal information
- Born: 16 September 1989 (age 35); Munich, West Germany
- Height: 1.70 m (5 ft 7 in)

Sport
- Country: Germany
- Sport: Alpine skiing
- Club: SC Lenggries

Barbara Wirth (born 16 September 1989) is a German former alpine ski racer competing in the FIS Alpine Ski World Cup.

== Skiing career ==
Wirth mainly competed in slalom and giant slalom events. In the 2013/2014 season she qualified for the slalom event at the 2014 Winter Olympics. She was officially nominated by the DOSB on 23 January 2014. She retired in 2016.
