= Christoph Nösig =

Austrian alpine skier

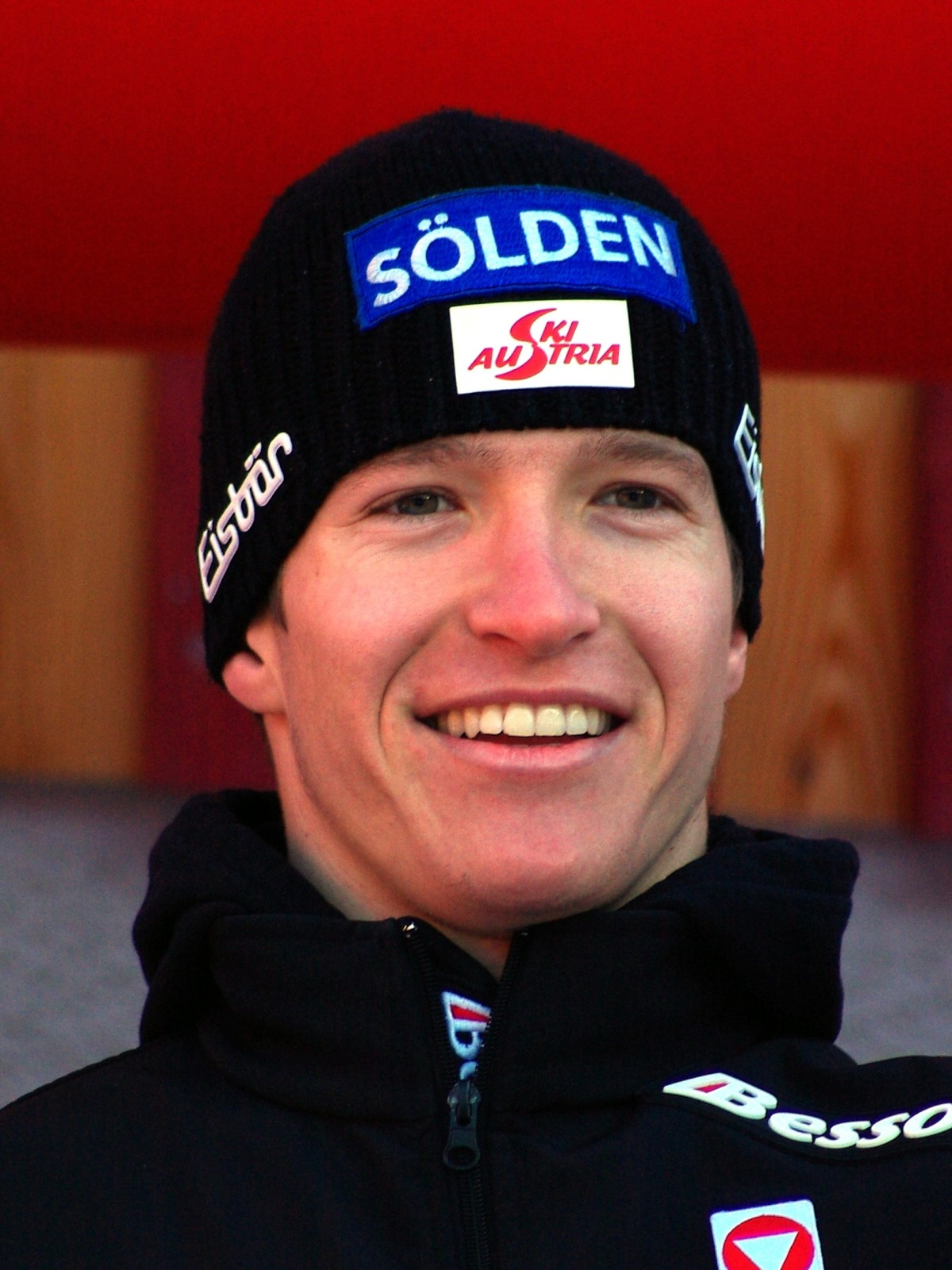
- Nösig in 2008

Personal information
- Born: 19 June 1985 (age 41) Innsbruck, Austria

Skiing career
- Sport: Alpine skiing

Christoph Nösig (also spelled Noesig; born 19 June 1985) is an Austrian alpine ski racer.

He competed at the 2015 World Championships in Beaver Creek, USA, in the giant slalom, and he was member of the Austrian team that won gold medals in the team event.
