= Regina Sterz =

Austrian alpine skier (born 1985)

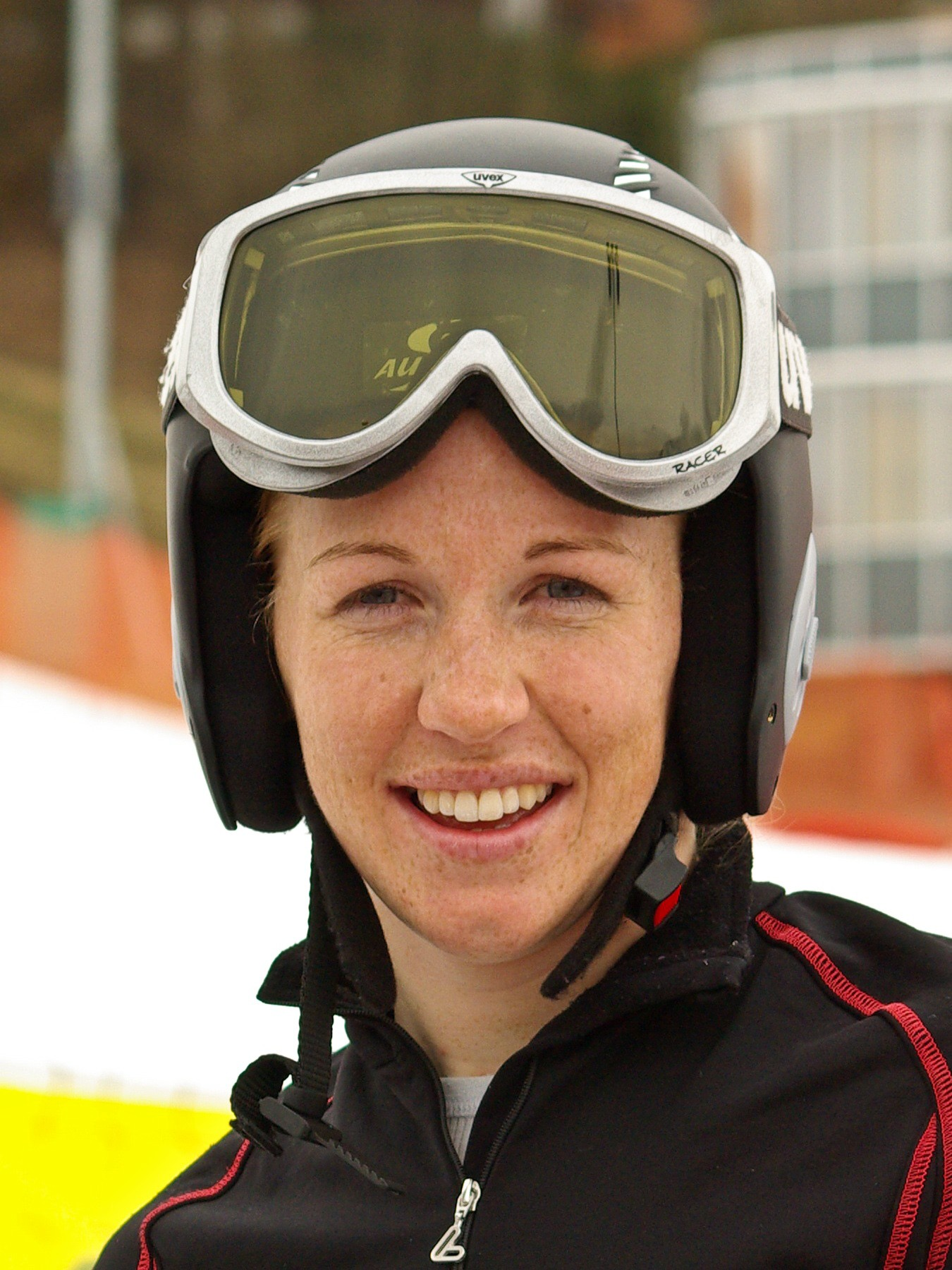

Personal information
- Nationality: Austrian
- Born: March 23, 1985 (age 40) St. Johann in Tirol
- Height: 168 cm (5 ft 6 in)
- Weight: 61 kg (134 lb)

Sport
- Country: Austria
- Sport: Skiing
- Event: Alpine Skiing

Achievements and titles
- Olympic finals: 2010 Winter Olympics: Downhill– 14

Regina Sterz (March 23, 1985) is a retired female skier from Austria. She represented Austria in the woman's downhill event in the 2010 Winter Olympics, in which she came 14th.

She has competed in hundreds of International Ski Federation events since 2003, eleven of which she won.
