= Philipp Schörghofer =

Austrian alpine skier

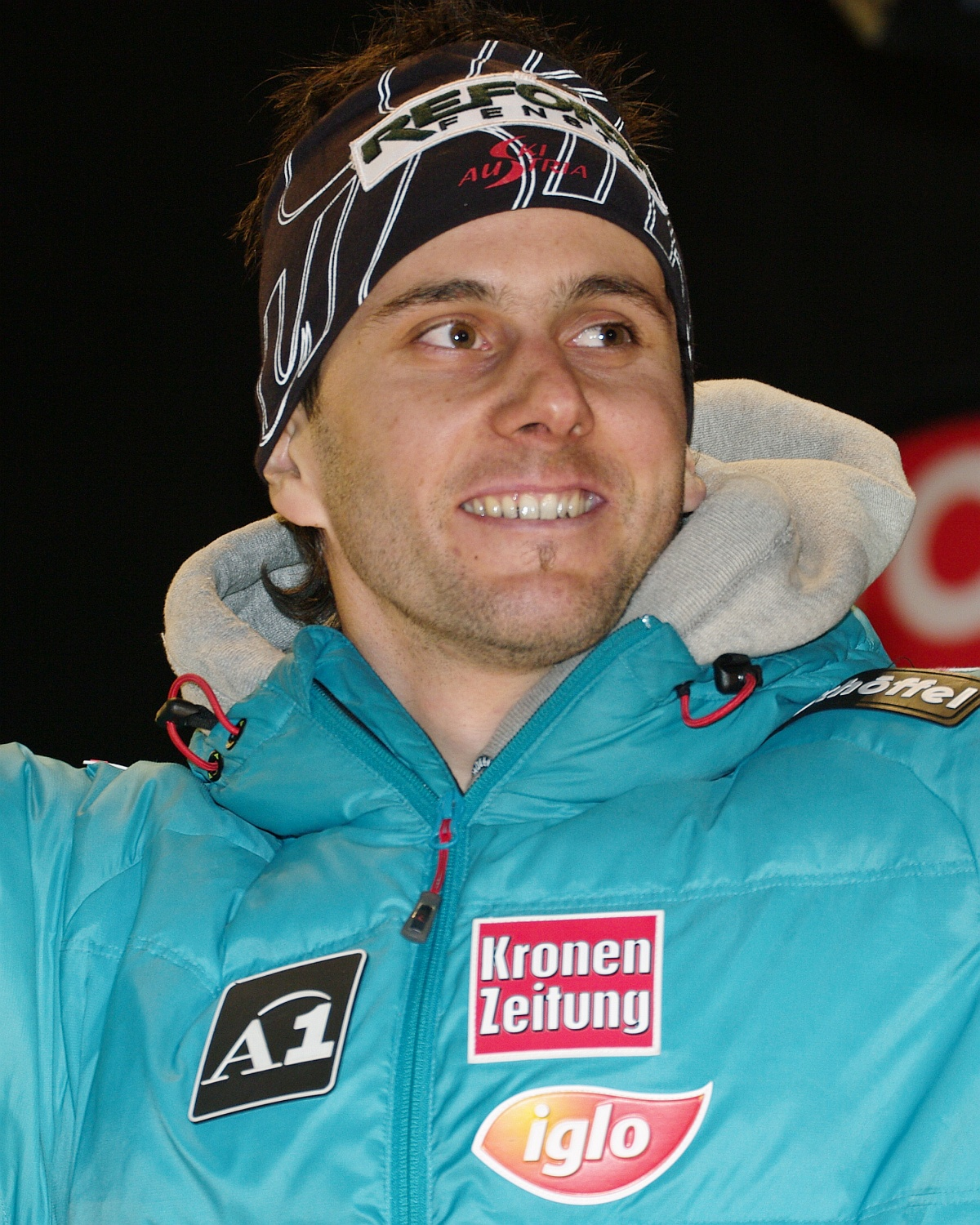
- Schörghofer in January 2011

Personal information
- Born: 20 January 1983 (age 43) Salzburg, Austria
- Height: 177 cm (5 ft 10 in)
- Website: schoergi.com

Skiing career
- Sport: Alpine skiing
- Club: Union Sportklub; Raika Filzmoos
- Retired: 3 May 2019
- Disciplines: Giant slalom
- World Cup debut: 17 December 2006 (age 23)

Olympics
- Teams: 2 – (2010, 2014)
- Medals: 0

World Championships
- Teams: 4 – (2009–15)
- Medals: 1 (0 gold)

World Cup
- Seasons: 9 – (2009–17)
- Wins: 1 – (1 GS)
- Podiums: 6 – (6 GS)
- Overall titles: 0 – (30th in 2012, 2016 )
- Discipline titles: 0 – (6th in GS, 2012)
Medal record
Men's alpine skiing
Representing Austria
World Championships
| Gold medal – first place | 2013 Schladming | Team event |
| Gold medal – first place | 2015 Beaver Creek | Team event |
| Silver medal – second place | 2011 Garmisch | Team event |
| Bronze medal – third place | 2011 Garmisch | Giant slalom |

Philipp Schörghofer (born 20 January 1983) is an Austrian former World Cup alpine ski racer. He represented Austria at two Winter Olympics and four World Championships.

== World Cup results ==
=== Season standings ===
| Season | Age | Overall | Slalom | Giant slalom | Super-G | Downhill | Combined |
|---|---|---|---|---|---|---|---|
| 2008 | 25 | 127 | — | 48 | — | — | — |
| 2009 | 26 | 46 | — | 12 | — | — | 49 |
| 2010 | 27 | 41 | — | 12 | — | — | 31 |
| 2011 | 28 | 41 | — | 7 | — | — | 24 |
| 2012 | 29 | 30 | — | 6 | — | — | 27 |
| 2013 | 30 | 39 | — | 10 | — | — | — |
| 2014 | 31 | 52 | — | 15 | — | — | — |
| 2015 | 32 | 69 | — | 21 | — | — | — |
| 2016 | 33 | 30 | — | 8 | — | — | — |
| 2017 | 34 | 44 | — | 10 | — | — | — |

=== Race podiums ===
- 1 win – (1 GS)
- 6 podiums – (6 GS)

| Season | Date | Location | Discipline | Place |
|---|---|---|---|---|
| 2010 | 12 Mar 2010 | Garmisch, Germany | Giant slalom | 3rd |
| 2011 | 6 Feb 2011 | Hinterstoder, Austria | Giant slalom | 1st |
| 2012 | 23 Oct 2011 | Sölden, Austria | Giant slalom | 3rd |
| 2012 | 18 Dec 2011 | Alta Badia, Italy | Giant slalom | 3rd |
| 2016 | 4 Mar 2016 | Kranjska Gora, Slovenia | Giant slalom | 2nd |
| 2017 | 7 Jan 2017 | Adelboden, Switzerland | Giant slalom | 3rd |

== World Championship results ==
| Year | Age | Slalom | Giant slalom | Super-G | Downhill | Combined |
|---|---|---|---|---|---|---|
| 2009 | 26 | — | 14 | — | — | — |
| 2011 | 28 | — | 3 | — | — | — |
| 2013 | 30 | — | 8 | — | — | — |
| 2015 | 32 | — | 10 | — | — | — |

== Olympic results ==
| Year | Age | Slalom | Giant slalom | Super-G | Downhill | Combined |
|---|---|---|---|---|---|---|
| 2010 | 27 | — | 12 | — | — | — |
| 2014 | 31 | — | 18 | — | — | — |
