= Marianne Kaufmann-Abderhalden =

Swiss alpine skier

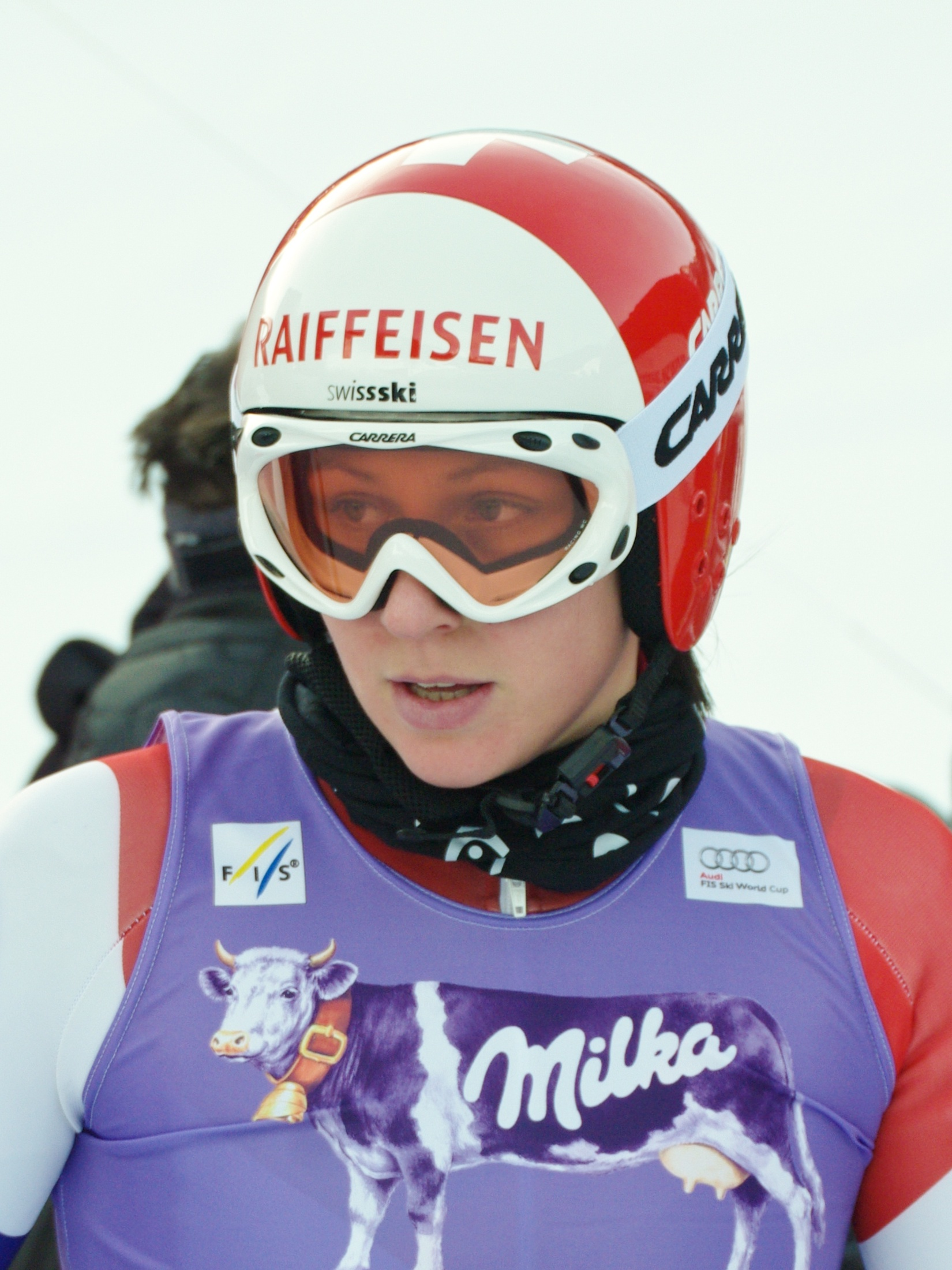
- Kaufmann-Abderhalden in January 2010

Personal information
- Born: 1 April 1986 (age 40) Grabs, St. Gallen, Switzerland
- Height: 1.77 m (5 ft 10 in)

Skiing career
- Sport: Alpine skiing
- Club: SSC Toggenburg
- Retired: 7 March 2015 (age 28)
- Disciplines: Downhill, Super-G, Combined
- World Cup debut: 15 March 2006 (age 19)

Olympics
- Teams: 1 – (2014)
- Medals: 0

World Championships
- Teams: 2 – (2013, 2015)
- Medals: 0

World Cup
- Seasons: 7 – (2009–2015)
- Wins: 1 – (1 DH)
- Podiums: 5 – (5 DH)
- Overall titles: 0 – (16th in 2014)
- Discipline titles: 0 – (5th in DH, 2014)
Medal record
Women's alpine skiing
Representing Switzerland
Junior World Ski Championships
Gold medal – first place	2006 Quebec	Downhill
Silver medal – second place	2006 Quebec	Combined

Marianne Kaufmann-Abderhalden (born 1 April 1986) is a retired World Cup alpine ski racer from Switzerland.

Born in Grabs, St. Gallen, she made her World Cup debut in Åre, Sweden, in March 2006. She won the gold medal in the downhill at the 2006 Junior World Ski Championships. Kaufmann-Abderhalden has attained five World Cup podiums, all in downhill. Her first was in March 2010 at Crans Montana and her sole victory came at Val-d'Isère in December 2013. She announced her retirement from competition in March 2015, due to her training and race performances being hampered by severe pain in her right knee.

== World Cup results ==
=== Season standings ===
Season	Age	Overall	Slalom	Giant Slalom	Super G	Downhill	Combined
2008	21	113	—	—	—	—	33
2009	22	126	59	—	—	—	—
2010	23	74	—	—	—	28	39
2011	24	44	—	—	40	17	27
2012	25	107	—	—	—	45	—
2013	26	51	—	—	40	21	18
2014	27	16	—	—	44	5	—
2015	28	76	—	—	—	30	—

=== Race podiums ===
- 1 win – (1 DH)
- 5 podiums – (5 DH)

Season	Date	Location	Discipline	Place
2010	6 Mar 2010	Crans-Montana, Switzerland	Downhill	3rd
2013	1 Dec 2012	Lake Louise, Canada	Downhill	3rd
2014	6 Dec 2013	Lake Louise, Canada	Downhill	2nd
2014	21 Dec 2013	Val-d'Isère, France	Downhill	1st
2014	25 Jan 2014	Cortina d'Ampezzo, Italy	Downhill	2nd

== World Championship results ==
Year	Age	Slalom	Giant slalom	Super-G	Downhill	Combined
2013	26	—	—	—	20	14
2015	28	—	—	—	29	—

== Olympic results ==
Year	Age	Slalom	Giant slalom	Super-G	Downhill	Combined
2014	27	—	—	—	DNF	DNF1
