= Carmen Thalmann =

Austrian alpine skier

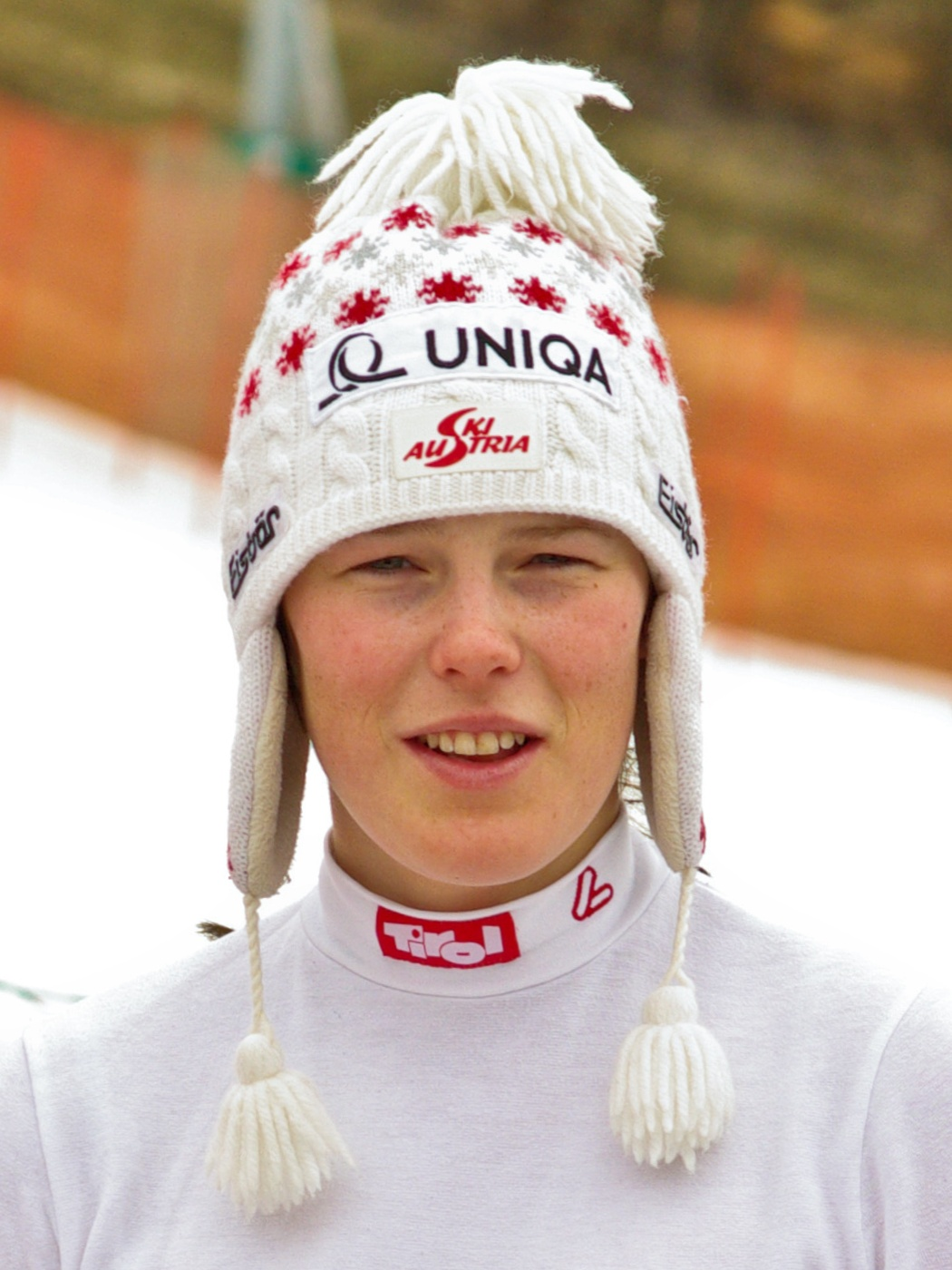
- Carmen Thalmann

Personal information
- Born: 11 September 1989 (age 36)

Skiing career
- Sport: Alpine skiing ♀
- Club: SV Berg Sektion Ski - Kaernten
- Disciplines: Slalom, giant slalom
- World Cup debut: 29 December 2008 (age 18)

World Cup
- Overall titles: 0 (31st in 2016)
- Discipline titles: 0 (12th in SL, 2015, 2016)

Carmen Thalmann (born 11 September 1989) is an Austrian former alpine ski racer. She competed at the 2015 World Championships in Beaver Creek, USA, where she placed seventh in the slalom.

== World Cup results ==
Season	Age	Overall	Slalom	Giant slalom	Super-G	Downhill	Combined
2012	22	68	24	—	—	—	—
2013	23	52	18	—	—	—	—
2014	24	56	22	40	—	—	—
2015	25	37	12	51	—	—	—
2016	26	31	12	28	—	—	—
2017	27	94	35	—	—	—	—
2018	28	70	27	35	—	—	—

- Standings through 4 February 2018

== World Championship results ==
Year	Age	Slalom	Giant slalom	Super-G	Downhill	Combined
2015	25	7	—	—	—	—
