= Petr Záhrobský =

Czech alpine skier (born 1980)

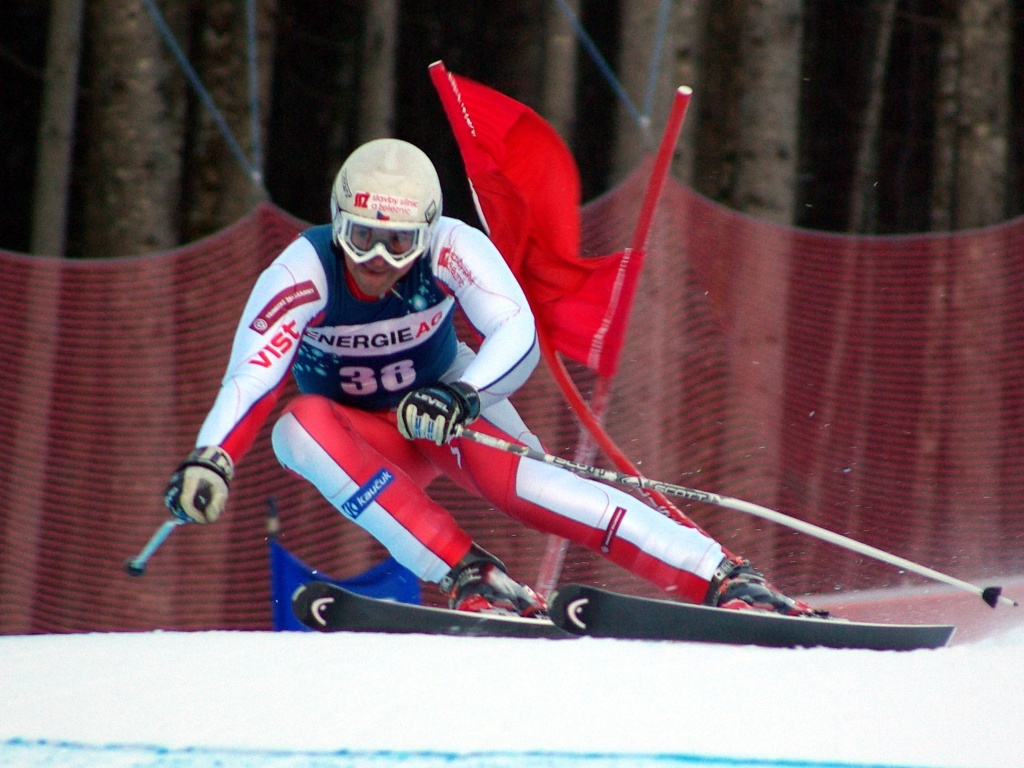
Záhrobský in 2008

Petr Záhrobský (born 30 November 1980 in Jilemnice) is a Czech alpine skier. He competed for the Czech Republic at the 2002 Olympics, 2006 Olympics and the 2010 Olympics. His best result was 24th in the Super-G in the 2002 Olympics.
