= Les Orres =

- Commune
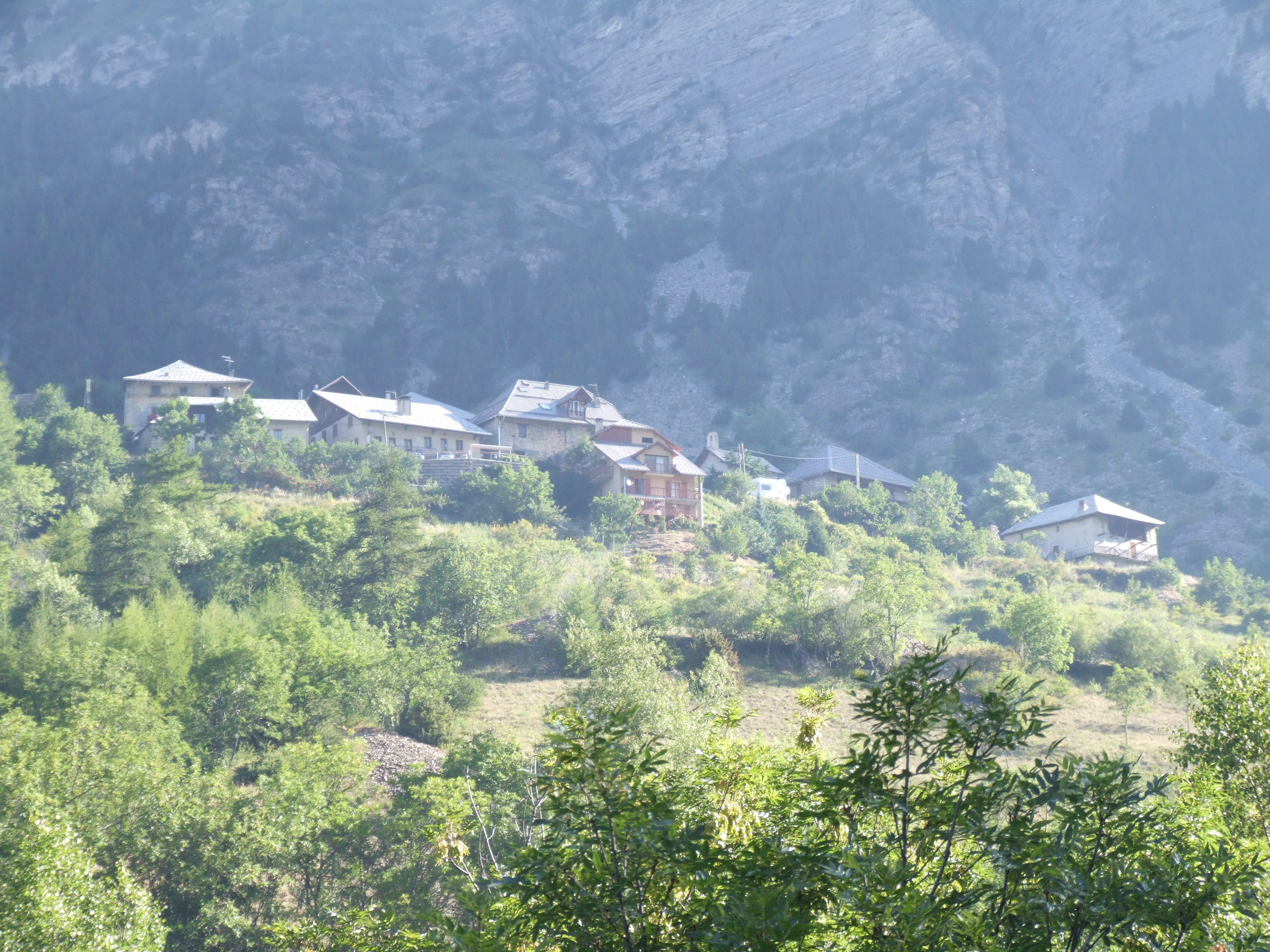
- A view of a hamlet in Les Orres

- Coat of arms
- Location of Les Orres
- Location within France Location within Provence-Alpes-Côte d'Azur
- Coordinates: 44°30′53″N 6°33′05″E
- Country: France
- Region: Provence-Alpes-Côte d'Azur
- Department: Hautes-Alpes
- Arrondissement: Gap
- Canton: Embrun

Government
  - Mayor (2026–32): Sébastien Bonnaffoux
- Area^{1}: 74.79 km^{2} (28.88 sq mi)
- Elevation: 1,460 m (4,790 ft)
- Highest elevation: 2,914 m (9,560 ft)
- Lowest elevation: 1,198 m (3,930 ft)
- Population (2023): 510
  - Density: 6.8/km^{2} (18/sq mi)
- Time zone: UTC+01:00 (CET)
  - Summer (DST): UTC+02:00 (CEST)
- INSEE/Postal code: 05098 /05200
- ^{1} French Land Register data, which excludes lakes, ponds, glaciers > 1 km^{2} (0.386 sq mi or 247 acres) and river estuaries.

Les Orres (French pronunciation: [le.z‿ɔʁ]; Occitan: Los Uèris) is a commune in the Hautes-Alpes department in southeastern France.

It is chiefly known for its ski resort: 38 alpine skiing runs, 100 km (62 mi) of runs.

== Geography ==
=== Climate ===
Les Orres has a humid continental climate (Köppen climate classification Dfb). The average annual temperature in Les Orres is 7.3 °C (45.1 °F). The average annual rainfall is 850.8 mm (33.50 in) with October as the wettest month. The temperatures are highest on average in July, at around 16.4 °C (61.5 °F), and lowest in January, at around −0.5 °C (31.1 °F). The highest temperature ever recorded in Les Orres was 34.2 °C (93.6 °F) on 5 July 1936; the coldest temperature ever recorded was −23.0 °C (−9.4 °F) on 3 January 1979.

Climate data for Les Orres (1981–2010 averages, extremes 1935−present)
Month	Jan	Feb	Mar	Apr	May	Jun	Jul	Aug	Sep	Oct	Nov	Dec	Year
Record high °C (°F)	17.0 (62.6)	18.4 (65.1)	19.2 (66.6)	25.0 (77.0)	27.0 (80.6)	32.8 (91.0)	34.2 (93.6)	33.0 (91.4)	29.5 (85.1)	27.0 (80.6)	21.0 (69.8)	16.5 (61.7)	34.2 (93.6)
Mean daily maximum °C (°F)	4.2 (39.6)	4.7 (40.5)	7.9 (46.2)	10.9 (51.6)	15.3 (59.5)	19.3 (66.7)	22.8 (73.0)	22.1 (71.8)	17.8 (64.0)	13.1 (55.6)	7.4 (45.3)	4.7 (40.5)	12.6 (54.7)
Daily mean °C (°F)	−0.5 (31.1)	−0.3 (31.5)	2.6 (36.7)	5.5 (41.9)	9.8 (49.6)	13.4 (56.1)	16.4 (61.5)	16.0 (60.8)	12.1 (53.8)	8.3 (46.9)	3.2 (37.8)	0.4 (32.7)	7.3 (45.1)
Mean daily minimum °C (°F)	−5.1 (22.8)	−5.3 (22.5)	−2.8 (27.0)	0.1 (32.2)	4.3 (39.7)	7.5 (45.5)	10.1 (50.2)	9.8 (49.6)	6.5 (43.7)	3.4 (38.1)	−1.1 (30.0)	−3.9 (25.0)	2.0 (35.6)
Record low °C (°F)	−23.0 (−9.4)	−22.0 (−7.6)	−20.9 (−5.6)	−11.0 (12.2)	−11.0 (12.2)	−3.2 (26.2)	−2.0 (28.4)	−2.0 (28.4)	−7.0 (19.4)	−14.6 (5.7)	−13.5 (7.7)	−20.5 (−4.9)	−23.0 (−9.4)
Average precipitation mm (inches)	56.1 (2.21)	45.0 (1.77)	54.8 (2.16)	77.7 (3.06)	84.4 (3.32)	84.2 (3.31)	54.1 (2.13)	64.2 (2.53)	84.7 (3.33)	94.8 (3.73)	79.7 (3.14)	71.1 (2.80)	850.8 (33.50)
Average precipitation days (≥ 1.0 mm)	6.5	5.4	6.4	9.1	10.8	9.4	6.3	7.2	7.2	8.9	7.1	7.4	91.7
Source: Meteociel

== Population ==
Historical population
Year	Pop.	±% p.a.
1968	235	—
1975	307	+3.89%
1982	429	+4.90%
1990	455	+0.74%
1999	446	−0.22%
2007	528	+2.13%
2012	506	−0.85%
2017	577	+2.66%
2023	510	−2.04%
Source: INSEE

== See also ==
- Communes of the Hautes-Alpes department
