= Patrick Küng =

Swiss alpine skier

Personal information
- Born: 11 January 1984 (age 42) Mühlehorn, Glarus, Switzerland
- Height: 181 cm (5 ft 11 in)
- Website: patrickkueng.ch

Skiing career
- Sport: Alpine skiing
- Club: Mürtschen Kerenzerberg
- Disciplines: Downhill, Super G
- World Cup debut: 16 January 2009 (age 25)

Olympics
- Teams: 1 – (2014)
- Medals: 0

World Championships
- Teams: 2 – (2013, 2015)
- Medals: 1 (1 gold)

World Cup
- Seasons: 10 – (2009–2017)
- Wins: 2 – (1 DH, 1 SG)
- Podiums: 5 – (3 DH, 2 SG)
- Overall titles: 0 – (10th in 2014)
- Discipline titles: 0 – (3rd in SG in 2014)
Medal record
Men's alpine skiing
Representing Switzerland
World Championships
| Gold medal – first place | 2015 Beaver Creek | Downhill |

Patrick Küng (born 11 January 1984) is a Swiss former World Cup alpine ski racer. He specialised in the speed events of Downhill and Super G and made his World Cup debut at Wengen in 2009.

Küng represented Switzerland at the World Championships in 2013 in Schladming, Austria. After placing 18th in the Super G, he produced his best run of the 2013 season in the downhill, finishing in 7th position.

Küng's first World Cup win came in Super G in December 2013, at Beaver Creek, USA. His second came a month later at the downhill in Wengen, Switzerland. Through January 2015, he has two World Cup wins and five podiums.

Küng won the gold medal in downhill at the 2015 World Championships at Beaver Creek.

At the Kitzbühel World Cup meeting in January 2019, Küng announced his immediate retirement from competition, citing a lack of willingness to take the necessary risks following a crash in Wengen which left him concussed.

== World Cup results ==
=== Season standings ===
| Season | Age | Overall | Slalom | Giant Slalom | Super G | Downhill | Combined |
|---|---|---|---|---|---|---|---|
| 2009 | 25 | 113 | — | — | — | 47 | 36 |
| 2010 | 26 | 40 | — | — | 29 | 16 | 41 |
| 2011 | 27 | 33 | — | — | 24 | 11 | — |
| 2012 | 28 | 44 | — | — | 33 | 20 | — |
| 2013 | 29 | 56 | — | — | 24 | 27 | — |
| 2014 | 30 | 10 | — | — | 3 | 5 | — |
| 2015 | 31 | 21 | — | — | 18 | 8 | — |
| 2016 | 32 | 101 | — | — | 48 | 33 | — |
| 2017 | 33 | 56 | — | — | 42 | 20 | — |
| 2018 | 34 | 79 | — | — | — | 25 | — |

- Standings through 28 January 2018

=== Race podiums ===
- 2 wins – (1 DH, 1 SG)
- 5 podiums – (3 DH, 2 SG)

| Season | Date | Location | Discipline | Place |
|---|---|---|---|---|
| 2010 | 10 Mar 2010 | Garmisch, Germany | Downhill | 3rd |
| 2012 | 29 Dec 2011 | Bormio, Italy | Downhill | 2nd |
| 2014 | 7 Dec 2013 | (United States) Beaver Creek, USA | Super G | 1st |
| 2014 | 18 Jan 2014 | Wengen, Switzerland | Downhill | 1st |
| 2014 | 2 Mar 2014 | Kvitfjell, Norway | Super-G | 2nd |

== World Championships results ==
| Year | Age | Slalom | Giant slalom | Super-G | Downhill | Combined |
|---|---|---|---|---|---|---|
| 2013 | 29 | — | — | 18 | 7 | — |
| 2015 | 31 | — | — | 16 | 1 | — |

== Olympic results ==
| Year | Age | Slalom | Giant slalom | Super-G | Downhill | Combined |
|---|---|---|---|---|---|---|
| 2014 | 30 | — | — | 12 | 15 | — |
