= Fanchini =

Fanchini is a surname. Notable people with the surname include:

- Elena Fanchini (1985–2023), Italian alpine skier
- Nadia Fanchini (born 1986), Italian alpine skier
- Sabrina Fanchini (born 1988), Italian alpine skier

== See also ==
- Franchini
