= Nativity of Mary =

Christian feast day for the birth of Mary

The Nativity of the Blessed Virgin Mary
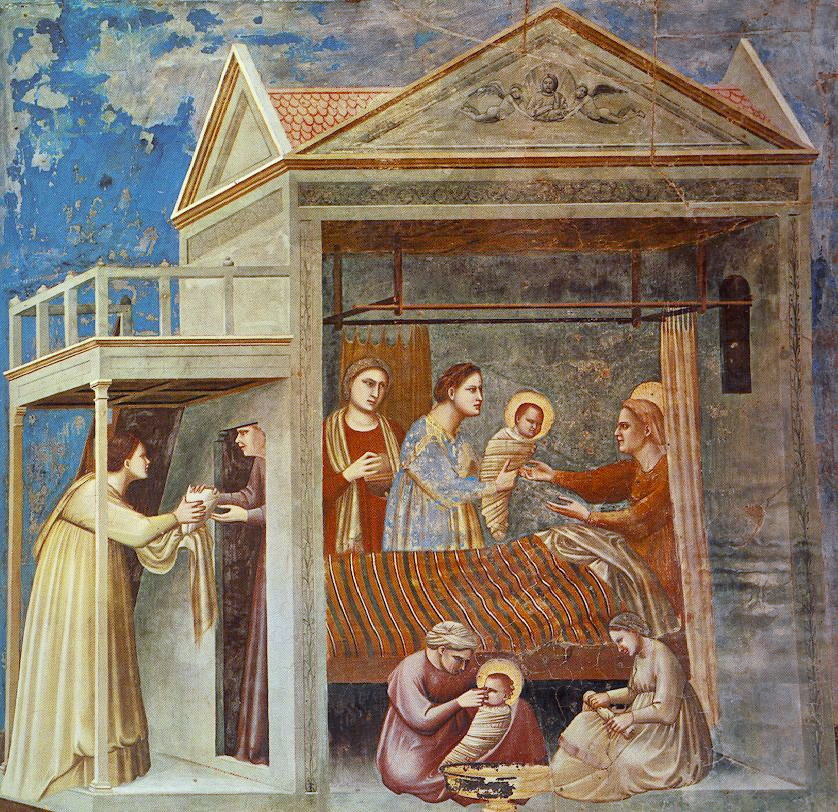
- The Birth of the Blessed Virgin Mary by Giotto, in the Scrovegni Chapel; Padua, Italy (c. 1305)

Sinless Immaculate Without Original Sin
- Venerated in: Catholic Church; Lutheran Churches; Anglican Communion; Eastern Orthodox Church; Oriental Orthodox Churches
- Feast: 8 September: Western Christianity and part of the Eastern churches; 8 September [O.S. 21 September]: most Oriental Orthodox and all of the Eastern Orthodox churches.; 9 May: The Coptic Orthodox and Ethiopian Orthodox Christians.
- Attributes: Birth of Mary, by her mother Saint Anne
- Patronage: Senglea, Malta as Virgin of Nativity; Mellieħa, Malta; Naxxar, Malta; Xagħra, Gozo; Cuba as Our Lady of Charity; Borongan, Philippines; Vailankanni, India as Our Lady of Good Health; Pampanga, Philippines – Virgin of Remedies; Egypt as Our Lady of Zeitoun; order of Slaves of the Immaculate Child; order of Sisters of Charity of the Maria Bambina; St. Mary's Syrian Cathedral Manarcad, Kerala; Our Lady's Nativity Parish, Pangil, Laguna, Philippines

The Nativity of the Blessed Virgin Mary, the Nativity of Mary, the Birth of the Virgin Mary, or (Latter) Marymas (Note: "The Virgin Mary; the feast of her Nativity dates from the 7th cent . The Mary Fair held at Cullen, Bf. is a survival of this festival, with change of date. It was known as Marymas at Ayr, and observed as a holiday at Dundee." Marymas is also spelled as Marymass, with both these words being derived from Mary, the mother of Jesus, as well as Mass, the Christian service of worship in which the Eucharist is celebrated.) (Note: Droleskey 2013 states: "Today is one of the greatest feast days in the whole of the liturgical calendar: the Nativity of the Blessed Virgin Mary... Marymas, one of true celebration, starting with Holy Mass itself.") refers to a Christian feast day celebrating the birth of Mary, mother of Jesus.

The modern Biblical canon does not record Mary's birth. The earliest known account of Mary's birth is found in the Gospel of James (5:2), an apocryphal text from the late second century, with her parents known as Saint Anne and Saint Joachim.

In the case of saints, the Church commemorates their date of death, with Saint John the Baptist and the Virgin Mary as the few whose birth dates are commemorated. The reason for this is found in the singular mission each had in salvation history, but traditionally also because these alone were holy in their very birth (for Mary, see Immaculate Conception; John was sanctified in Saint Elizabeth's womb according to the traditional interpretation of Luke 1:15).

Devotion to the innocence of Mary under this Marian title is widely celebrated in many cultures across the globe in various prayers and hymns such as the Novena in Honor of the Nativity of the Blessed Virgin Mary.

== Narrative ==
The Gospel of James, which was probably put into its final written form in the early second century, describes Mary's father Joachim as a wealthy member of one of the Twelve Tribes of Israel. He and his wife Anne were deeply grieved by their childlessness.

Some traditions place the birthplace of the Virgin Mary in Sepphoris, where a 5th-century basilica is excavated at the site. Some accounts speak of Nazareth and others say it was in a house near the Sheep Gate in Jerusalem. It is possible that a wealthy man such as Joachim had a home in both Judea and Galilee. However, Charles Souvay, writing in the Catholic Encyclopedia, says that the idea that Joachim possessed large herds and flocks cannot be asserted with certainty, as the sources for this are "of very doubtful value."

=== History ===
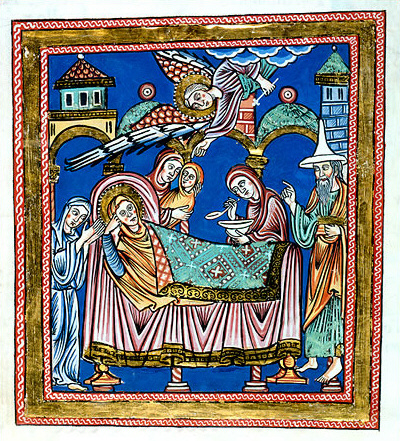
12-century German Nativity of Mary with her father, Joachim, wearing a Jewish hat

The earliest document commemorating the celebration of the nativity of Mary comes from a hymn written in the sixth century. The feast may have originated somewhere in Syria or Palestine in the beginning of the sixth century, when after the Council of Ephesus, the cult of the Mother of God was greatly intensified, especially in Syria. This supposition is supported by the presence of hymns for the feast in the Georgian Chantbook of Jerusalem which was compiled in the mid-6th century; the hymnographic content pre-dates this terminus ante quem.

The first liturgical commemoration is connected with the sixth century dedication of the Basilica Sanctae Mariae ubii nata est, now called the Church of St. Anne in Jerusalem. The original church, built in the fifth century, was a Marian basilica erected on the spot known as the Shepherd's Pool and thought to have been the home of Mary's parents. In the seventh century, the feast was celebrated by the Byzantines as the Feast of the Birth of the Blessed Virgin Mary. Since the story of Mary's Nativity is known only from apocryphal sources, the Latin Church was slower in adopting this festival. At Rome, the Feast began to be kept toward the end of the 7th century, brought there by Eastern monks.

=== Legends ===
The Diocese of Angers in France claims that St. Maurilius instituted this feast at Angers in consequence of a revelation about 430. On the night of 8 September, a man heard the angels singing in heaven, and on asking the reason, they told him they were rejoicing because the Virgin was born on that night; but this tradition is not substantiated by historical proofs.

== Feast day ==
The Nativity of the Blessed Virgin Mary is traditionally celebrated as a liturgical feast on 8 September, nine months after the solemnity of the Immaculate Conception, celebrated on 8 December, according to the General Roman Calendar, many Lutheran calendars, most Anglican calendars, and the Tridentine calendar. This date is also used by the Byzantine and Western Rite Orthodox Churches, the Syriac Orthodox Church, and the Armenian Apostolic Church. However, Coptic and Ethiopian Orthodox Churches celebrate the feast on 9 May (1 Bashans, EC 1 Ginbot).

Previous to the reforms by Pope Pius XII, the General Roman Calendar of 1954 kept the Nativity of the Blessed Virgin Mary as an Octave since the Octave was established by Pope Innocent IV in 1243.

=== Customs ===
Saint Andrew of Crete says that the whole creation is jubilant on this special day because the birth of Mary is a joyful prelude to the gift of humanity's salvation.

==== France ====
In France, the Nativity of the Blessed Virgin Mary is known as "Our Lady of the Grape Harvest" among the winegrowers. The best grapes are brought to the local church to be blessed and then some bunches are attached to the hands of the statue of Mary. A festive meal that includes the new grapes is part of this day.

==== India ====
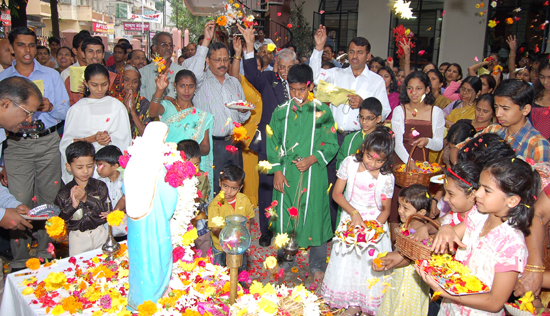
Feast of the Nativity of the Blessed Virgin Mary celebration by Roman Catholic believers in Pune, Maharashtra

In Kerala, the feast of Mary's Nativity, called Nalpiravi (നൽ‌പിറവി), is a major celebration among Saint Thomas Christians and is always celebrated as an octave. An eight-day abstinence (Ettu Nombu) of meat and alcohol is observed from 1 September until 8 September. During this period, vegetarian food is prepared in all families of Saint Thomas Christian and churches organize charitable activities, evangelical conventions and special prayers to honor Virgin Mary. Praying Kontha (The Holy Rosary) in groups is an important custom during these days. On the day of the Nativity of the Blessed Virgin Mary, a ceremonial pudding called Pachoru (പാച്ചോറ്) which is made using milk, rice and jaggery is prepared in churches and distributed to the devotees in the afternoon as part of the feast celebration. In houses, Theenmura (a festive meal including meat and fish dishes) is prepared.

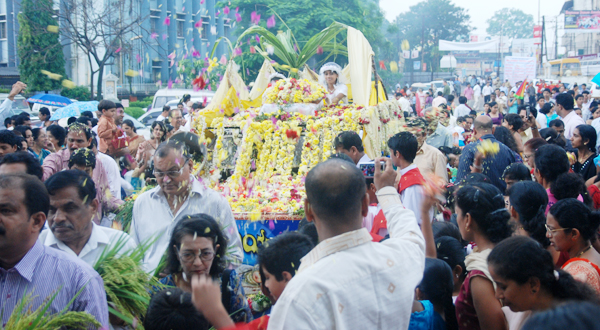
Feast of the Nativity of Mary Procession in Mangalore, India

In Goa, the feast of Mary's Nativity, called the Monti Fest, is a major family celebration, serving as a thanksgiving festival blessing the harvest of new crops, and observed with a festive lunch centered on the blessed grain of the harvest. Showering flowers on a statue of the Virgin Mary is an important custom in Konkan region. In Mangalore it is the feast of Mary's Nativity, called the "Monthi Fest". On this day every Mangalorean Christian eats pulses and vegetables. The priest blesses a branch of grain which is added to food. Before the feast on 8 September there are nine days of novena followed by the offering of flowers on baby Mary's statue.

==== Malta ====
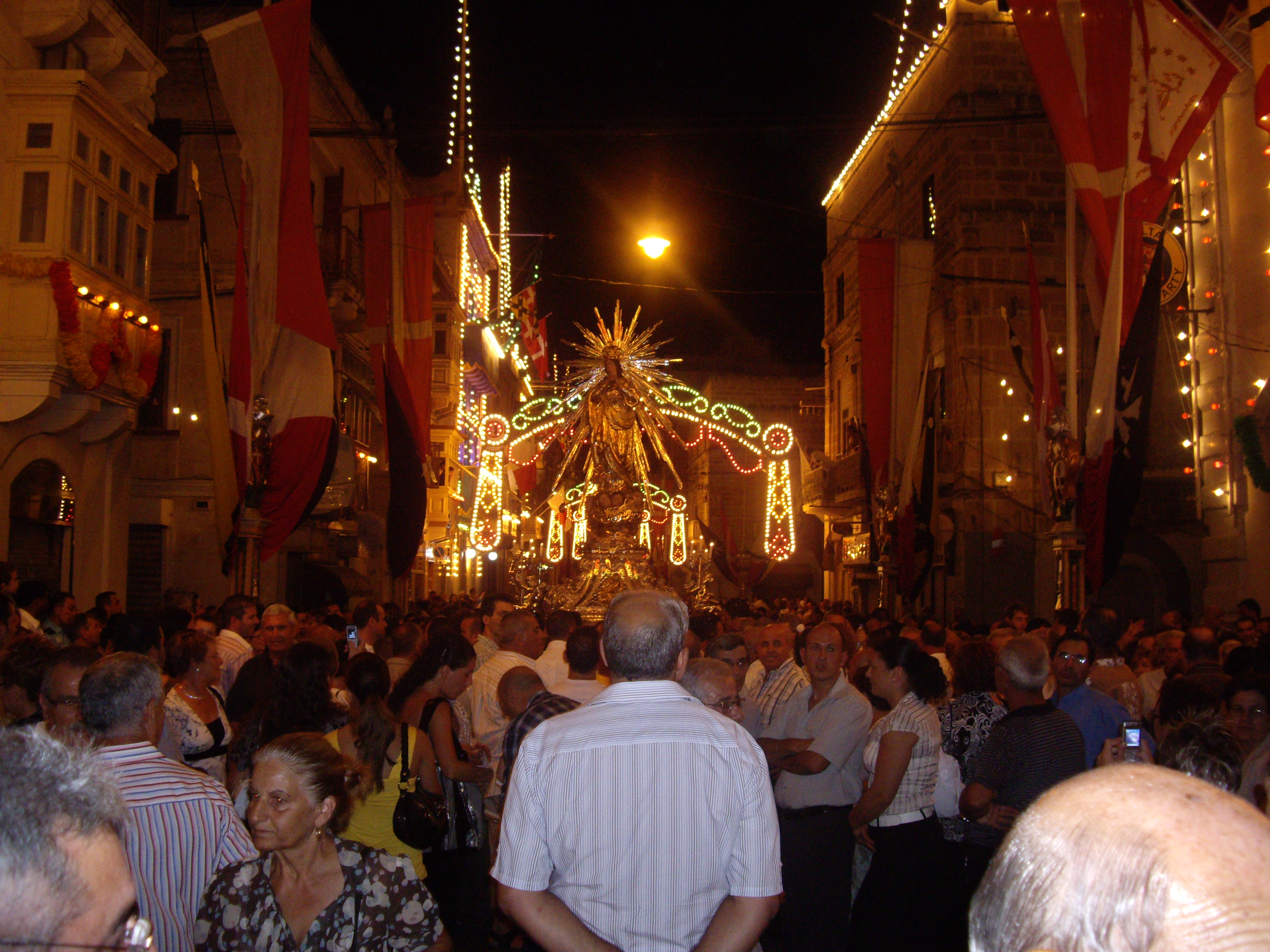
Feast of the Nativity, Senglea

In Malta, the feast of the nativity of the Virgin Mary (Maltese: Il-Bambina) is referred to as Victory Day (Maltese: Jum Il-Vittorja), since the day coincides with three major victories throughout Maltese history. Namely: a turn in the tide of the Great Siege of Malta in 1565, the surrender of French troops occupying the island in 1800, and the end of the Siege of Malta during the Second World War in 1942.

The Bambina is celebrated in traditional Maltese feasts in four localities, those being Naxxar, Senglea and Mellieħa in Malta and Xagħra in Gozo. Mary is also honored as Our Lady of Victories. Churches are decorated for the occasion with red damask hangings. Each locality has a different feast, but in general it consists of brass band concerts/marches, fireworks, and liturgical functions such as a procession with a likeness of the Bambina. At Fort St Angelo, Mass is celebrated at the Chapel of the Nativity of the Virgin Mary, and later, a second Mass at the Chapel of St Anne.

== In Catholic iconography ==
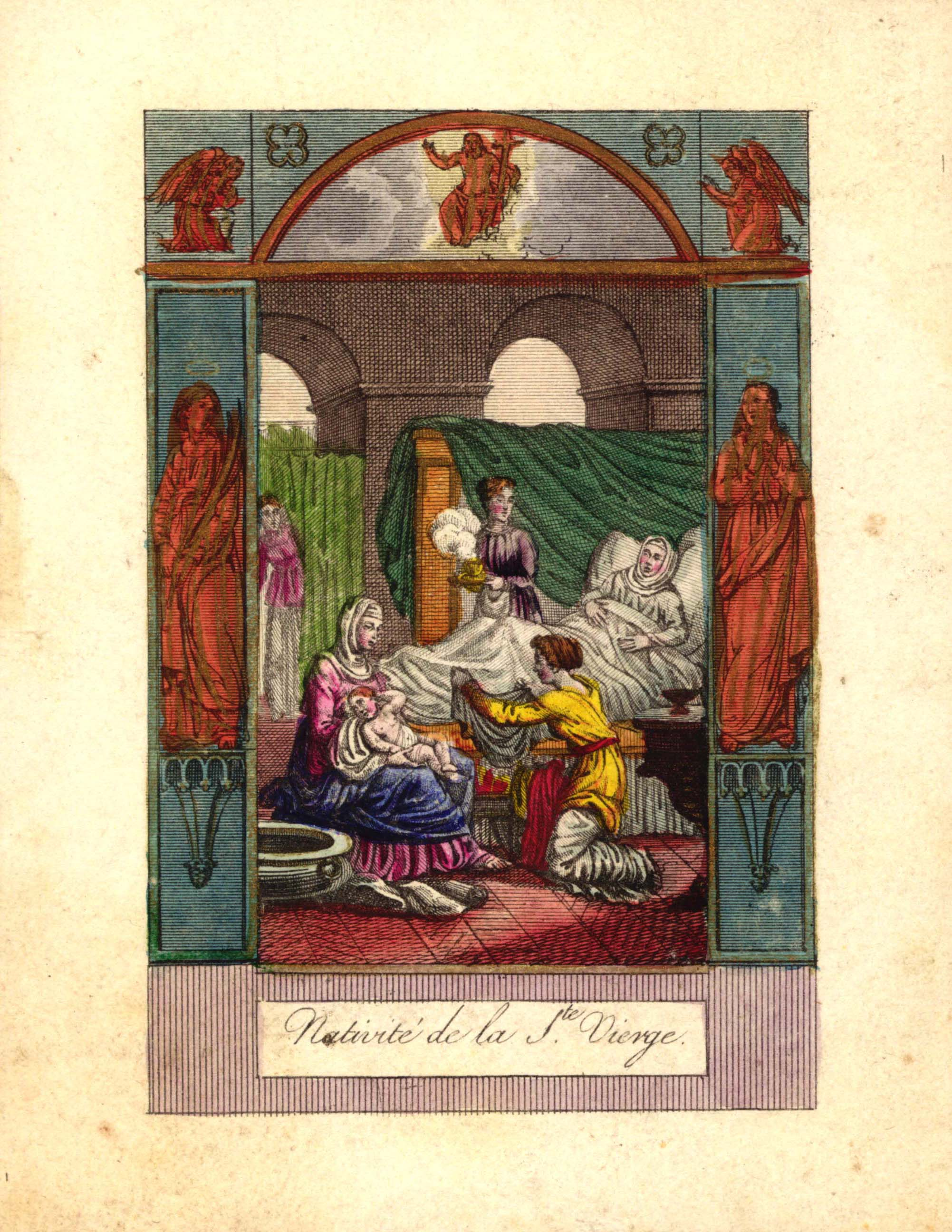
Holy card depicting the birth of the Blessed Virgin Mary. University of Dayton Libraries.

The scene was frequently depicted in art, as part of cycles of the Life of the Virgin. Medieval depictions of Mary in infancy often include her birth by Saint Anne. In late medieval depictions the setting was often in a wealthy household.

In 1730, devotion to Mary in her first infancy was evident among the Franciscan nuns in Lovere, Italy, where a wax statue of the Santissima Maria Bambina was venerated and later brought to Milan under the care of Sisters of Charity. In Southern France, the devotion penetrated into the bride gift wedding custom of Globe de Marièe, where the baby Mary is placed on the cushion, representing children and fertility as one of the ideal wishes of a newlywed bride.

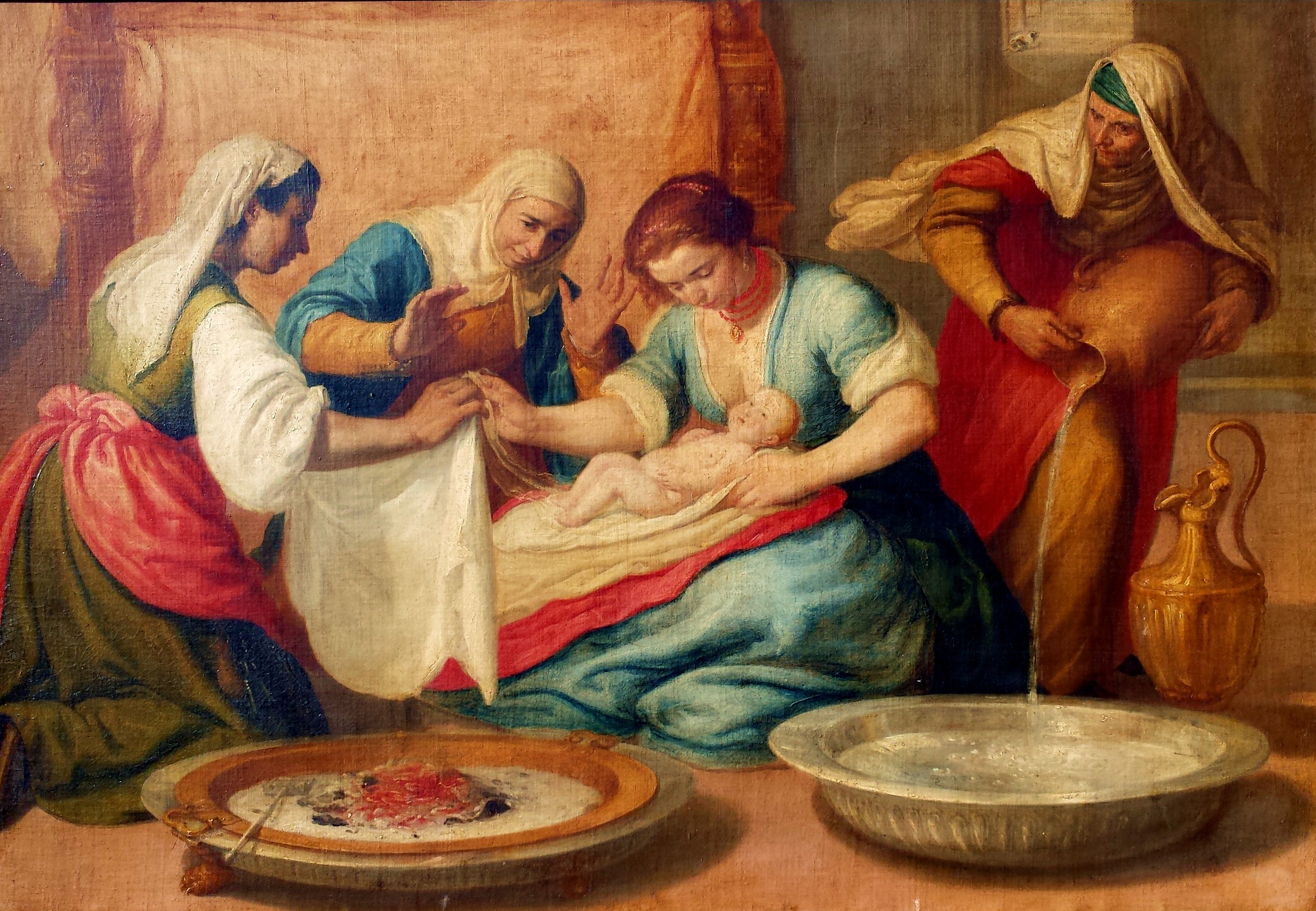
Mariä Geburt, Spanien, 17. Jh. Museum am Dom, Trier

A similar devotion showcasing the toddler years of Mary began to develop, mainly in former Spanish territories such as Mexico, Guatemala and the Philippines, where the La Niña María is portrayed as a prepubescent girl.

In 19th-century Mexico, the Conceptionists nun Sister Magdalena endorsed a devotion to the infant Virgin, using the Cabeza or head of a cherub angel from a damaged monstrance to create a Santo image. Later, Marian visionary, Rosario Arrevillaga, began a religious order devoted to the same Marian title called the Order of the Slaves of the Immaculate Child.

Pope Benedict XV recognised the Marian image in Senglea, Malta under the Marian title "Our Lady of Victories", crowned by Archbishop Mauro Caruana on 4 September 1921. The image which once adorned a Catholic galleon was shipwrecked in 1618 near the Dalmatian islands and was rescued to the present town, which also celebrates its feast on 8 September. The state is also widely known as Maria Bambina.

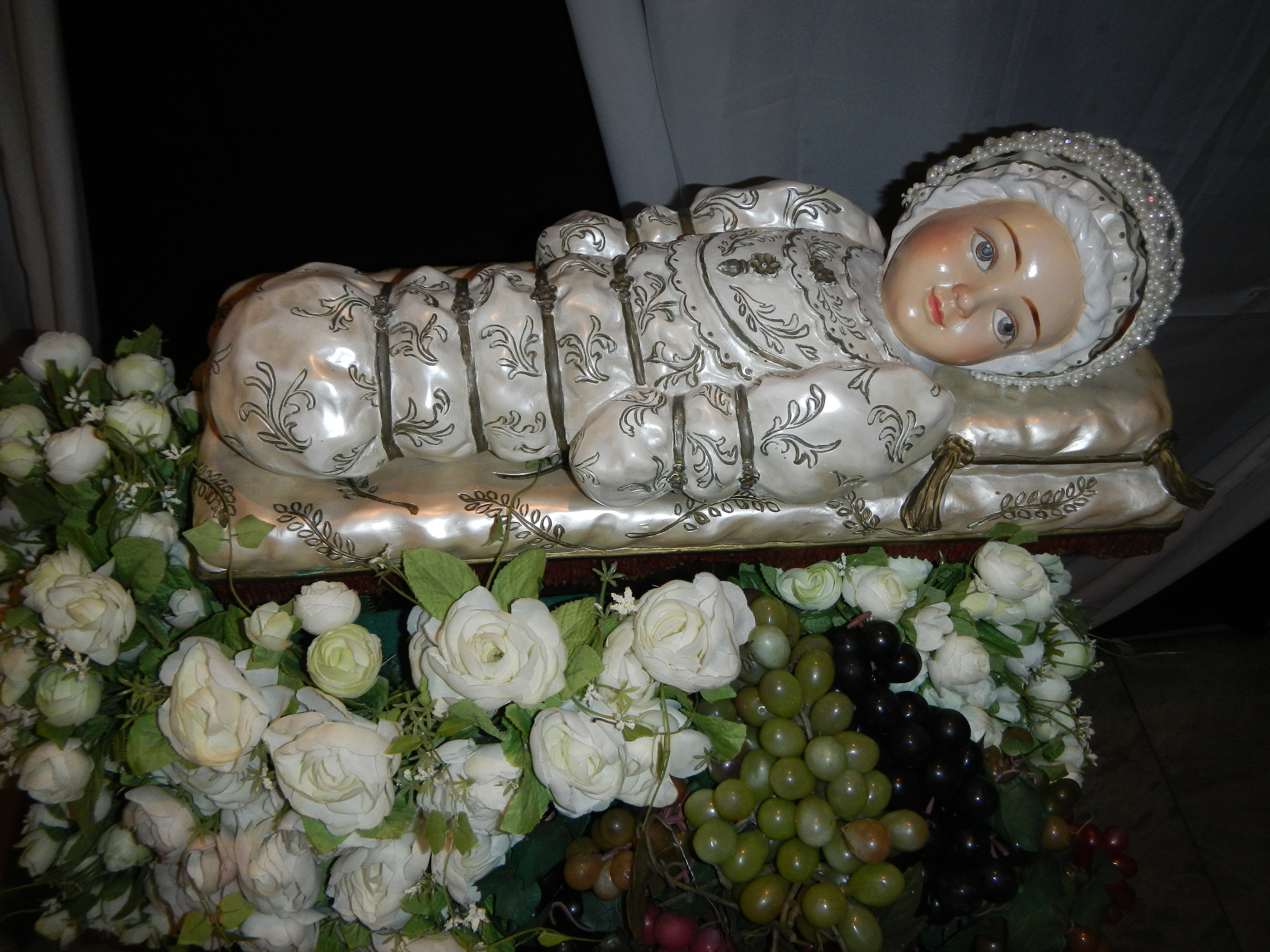
The Infant Mary wrapped in swaddling clothes. Museum of Valenzuela City, Philippines.

In the Philippines, pious Catholics adopted the same devotion to the toddler Virgin, dressing her in pastel colours and crowning her with flowers to emphasise her virginity and innocence, as opposed to the traditional diadem reserved for images of adult saints. Similar to Hispanic traditions, candies and cakes are popularly offered in the infant Virgin's honour, emphasizing her honorific title as La Dulce María or the Sweet Mary. On 27 December 2018, the House of Representatives of the Philippines officially approved bill #7856, in honor of the Virgin Mary's birthday for 8 September as a working holiday. On 13 August 2019, President Rodrigo Duterte signed Republic Act 11370, a law declaring 8 September a special working holiday in the entire country to commemorate the Feast of the Nativity of the Blessed Virgin Mary.

Though unrelated, certain places with Marian devotion juxtapose the Feast of Mary's birthdate with their own respective localised images such as the following:

- Cuba – Our Lady of Charity
- Philippines – Virgen de los Remedios de Pampanga
- Philippines – Nuestra Señora de la Natividad de Pangil
- India – Our Lady of Good Health
- Malta – Our Lady of Victories

== Commemorations ==
=== Catholic ===
The Milan Cathedral is dedicated to the Nativity of the Virgin Mary. The Nativity of the Blessed Virgin Mary Cathedral is located in Biloxi, Mississippi. There is also a Cathedral of the Nativity of the Blessed Virgin Mary in Juneau, Alaska. The Nativity of Mary, Blessed Virgin Catholic Church in High Hill, Texas is a historic church built in 1906. The Nativity of the Blessed Virgin Mary Parish in Lorain, Ohio was founded in 1898 to serve the Polish-American community. Nativity of Mary Catholic Church and School is located in Bloomington, Minnesota and is part of the Archdiocese of Saint Paul-Minneapolis. The Church of the Nativity of the Blessed Virgin Mary in Singapore, built in 1852, is located in Hougang.

=== Orthodox Church ===
The Nativity of the Virgin Mary Orthodox Church in Madison, Illinois, is part of the Orthodox Church in America Diocese of the Midwest. The Nativity of the Theotokos Monastery in Saxonburg, Pennsylvania, north of Pittsburgh, is the first Greek Orthodox women's monastery in America, founded in 1989.

== In Islamic scripture ==
The birth of Mary is narrated in the third sura (chapter) of the Qur'an with references to her father Imran, after whom the chapter is named, as well as her mother, Hannah. Hannah prayed to God to fulfil her desire to have a child and vowed, if her prayer was accepted, that her child (whom she initially thought would be male) would be dedicated to the service of God (a direct parallel to the Old Testament Hannah, whose mothering of the judge and prophet Samuel followed an identical storyline). She prayed for her child to remain protected from Satan (Shayṭān) and Muslim tradition records a hadith, which states that the only children born without the "touch of Satan", were Mary and Jesus.

== See also ==
- Infant Mary
- Most Holy Name of the Blessed Virgin Mary
- Ettu Nombu
- Monti Fest
