= Infant Mary =

Catholic devotion to infant or child Mary

The Divine Infantess
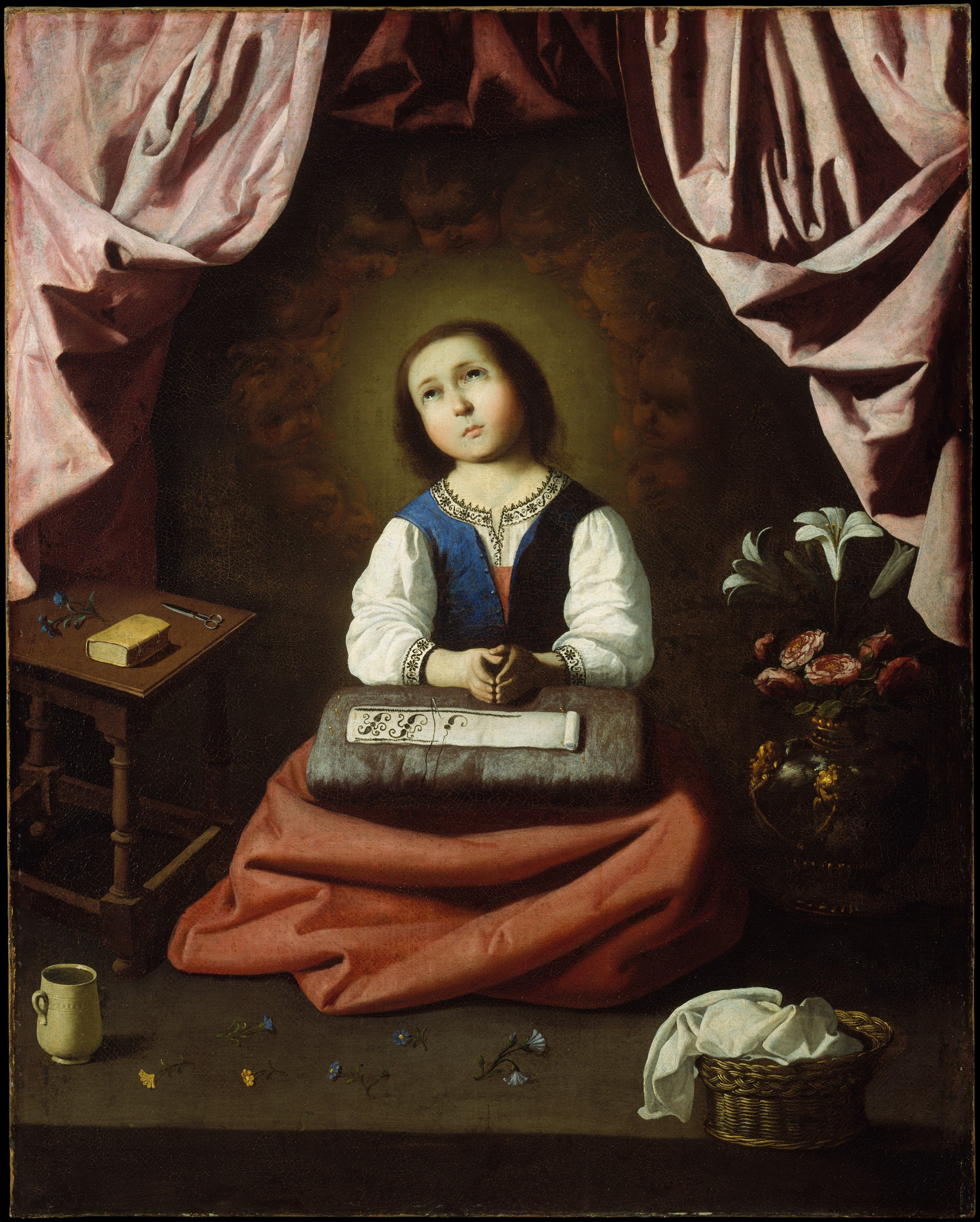
- The Child Virgin in Ecstasy, by Francisco de Zurbarán.
- Venerated in: Catholic Church
- Major shrine: Shrine of the Holy Infant Mary, Milan
- Feast: 8 September; Nativity of Mary
- Attributes: Blessed Virgin Mary as an infant or child.

The Infant Mary, also known as the Divine Infantess, the Virgin Child, Baby Mary, Little Mary, Wee Mary, Little Immaculate Mary, Child Mary, and as Divina Infantita in Mexico and Maria Bambina in Italy, is a Catholic devotion to the infant or child Mary, parallel to devotion to the infant Jesus.

The canonical Scriptures make no mention of the birth or infancy of Mary, and the devotion relies primary on Sacred Tradition and private revelation.

== Liturgical Feasts ==
Liturgical feasts relating to Mary's infancy and childhood include:

- The Feast of the Immaculate Conception of Mary (8 December)
- The Feast of the Nativity of the Blessed Virgin Mary (8 September)
- The Feast of the Holy Name of Mary (12 September)
- The Feast of the St. Joachim and St. Anne (26 July)
- The Feast of the Presentation of the Blessed Virgin Mary (21 November)

== Devotion Images ==
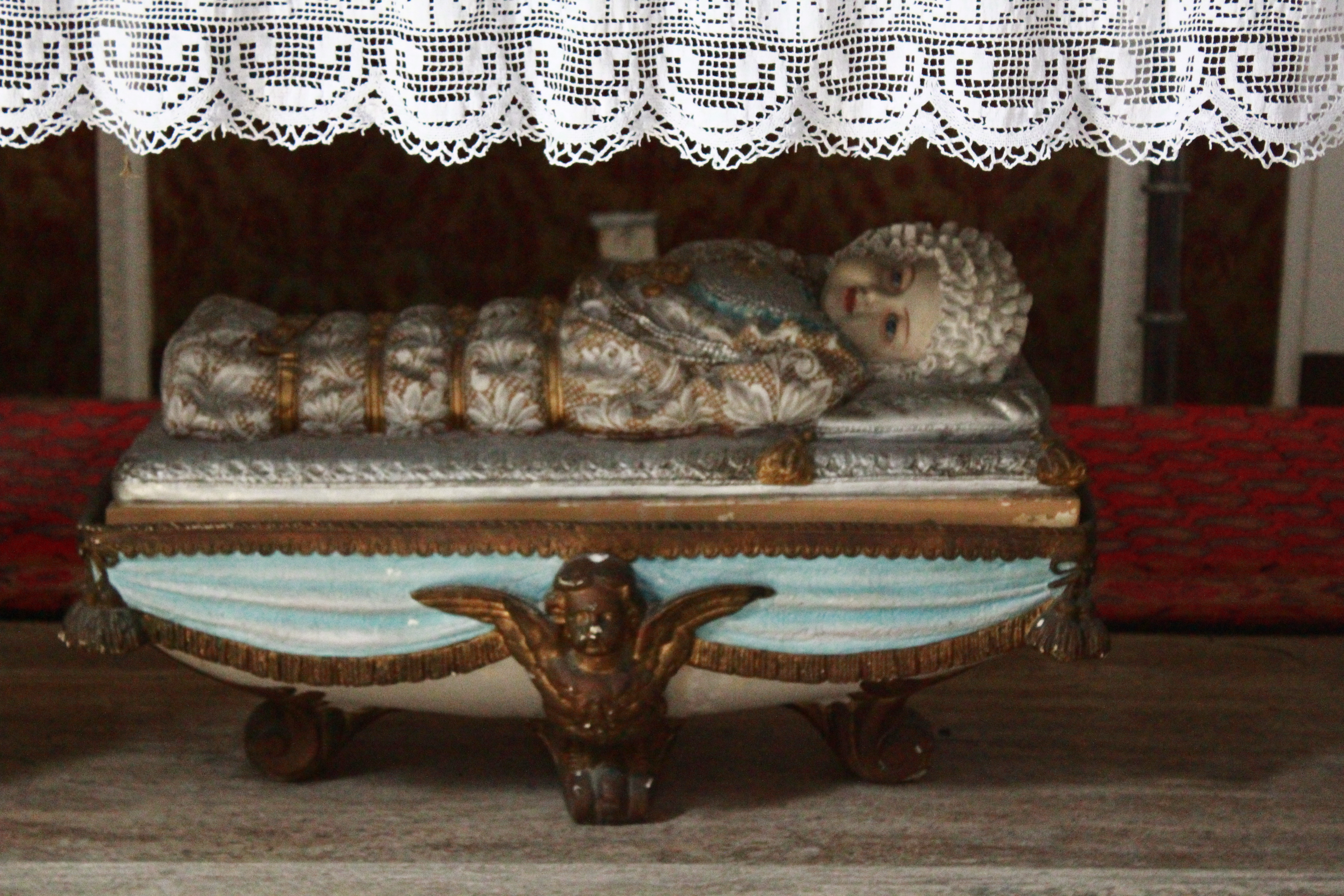
Recreation of the famous Maria Bambina image, from the Church of Maria Bambina, Dogana.

Various images of the Divine Infantess have been produced and crowned: Most famously the Maria Bambina of Milan and the Divina Infantita of Mexico.

== Theology ==
In Catholic Mariology Mary is held as having been born and conceived a saint and full of Grace, as a consequence of the Immaculate Conception. It is also generally held by Theologians that she had free will and rational thought, through infused knowledge, from "the first instant of her conception," worshipping and loving God in her mother's womb and as an infant and child. This forms a theological basis for her veneration as an infant or child. According to Alphonsus Liguori, "The first reason for Mary's great love for human beings is that she loves God so much... Think of what the Saints have done for their neighbor because they have loved God. But what Saint's love for God can match Mary's? She loved Him more in the first moment of her existence than all the Saints and angels ever loved Him or will love Him."

== History ==
=== In Italy ===
Devotion to the Infant Mary in Italy, called Maria Bambina, can be traced back to at least 1007 AD, in the city of Milan. In 1007 the church of Santa Maria Fulcorina (Later Milan Cathedral) was dedicated to the "mystery of the Nativity of Mary." This devotion would further grow in Milan as the church became the Cathedral of Milan, and in 1251 Innocent IV granted in perpetuity a plenary indulgence for those who visit the cathedral on the feast of Mary's Nativity. In the 16th century St. Charles Borromeo would construct the present dome for the cathedral, dedicating it to the birth of Mary. The words Mariae Nascenti, meaning roughly "to the infant Mary," would be inscribed in the main entrance of the cathedral.

In the early 18th century, devotion to Maria Bambina experienced a revival due to the donation of a wax simulacrum of the Infant Mary by Sister Isabella Chiara Fornari, a Franciscan from Todi. Between 1720 and 1730, Fornari gifted this artifact to Monsignor Alberico Simonetta. Upon Simonetta's death in 1739, the simulacrum was transferred to the Capuchin Sisters of Santa Maria degli Angeli in Milan. Due to subsequent religious suppressions initiated by Emperor Joseph II and later Napoleon, the Capuchin nuns moved the image through various locations: first to the convent of the Augustinian nuns, then to the Lateran canonesses, and eventually to the parish priest Fr. Luigi Bosisio. In 1842, Bosisio entrusted the image to Sister Teresa Bosio, the superior of the Sisters of Charity of Lovere, a religious institute founded by St. Bartolomea Capitanio. The image was then kept at Ciceri Hospital in Milan, and the nuns began to be referred to as the “Sisters of Maria Bambina." In 1876 the image of Maria Bambina was brought to the Generalate of the Sisters in Via Santa Sofia where it remains to this day.

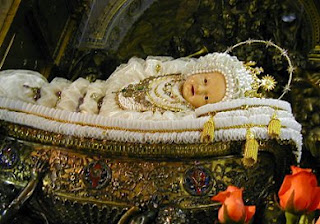
Image of Maria Bambina in Milan.

As the image began to fade, it fell out of use. However, starting in 1884, various miracles began to be associated with the image: Several nuns of the order experienced healing from serious illnesses, and the image itself was miraculously restored, regaining its original flesh tones and coming to resemble what the nuns described as “una bambina vera,” or a "real little girl." In 1884, the image was dressed in new garments, placed in a new cradle, and moved to the convent chapel. The following year, in 1885, it was carried in a solemn procession to the Motherhouse chapel, attracting many pilgrims who sought the Infant Mary's assistance. Subsequently, an archconfraternity named Maria Bambina and the “League of the Innocent” were established. In 1904, the image was ceremoniously crowned with Papal approval by Cardinal Ferrari, contributing to the spread of devotion to the Infant Mary from Milan throughout Italy.

=== In Mexico ===
The history of the devotion in Mexico dates back to January 6, 1840, in Mexico City. During the feast of the Epiphany Conceptionist Sister Magdalena de San José was praying before the manger of the infant Jesus, and asked herself. “Why is it that the Mother of God is not celebrated at her birth like her Son Jesus is?" At that moment, the Blessed Virgin Mary appeared to her in the form of an infant, dressed like a queen and carried by angels, lying down. And Magdalena heard her say to her:

I want to be honored in my childhood, since it is a very forgotten devotion, and I will grant all the graces that are asked of me under this invocation and this image

After this Magdalena dreamed of the Infant Mary two times, moved by such an inexplicable events she began to dedicate herself to spreading devotion to the Infant Mary as "Divina Infantita," or Divine Infantess. Being so zealous for this devotion, she asked permission from her superior, Mother Guadalupe de San Lorenzo, to make a title and image of the apparition she had witnessed and thus fulfill the desire of Infant Mary. However, her superior decided to test if the apparition was a delirium and ignored her, thinking that if the apparitions of the Blessed Virgin were authentic, Magdalena would insist on it. A few days later, while Magdalena was cleaning, she found the head of one of the sculpted angels on the tabernacle had fallen off. She took it and brought it to the Mother Superior so that she would authorize her to make the image of the Divine Infantess with the little head of the angel. She continually pleaded with her until the abbess granted her permission and called a sculptor. Magdalena explained to him what the apparition she had seen looked like, and after it was done, she said the image was beautiful and radiant, just as she had seen during her vision.

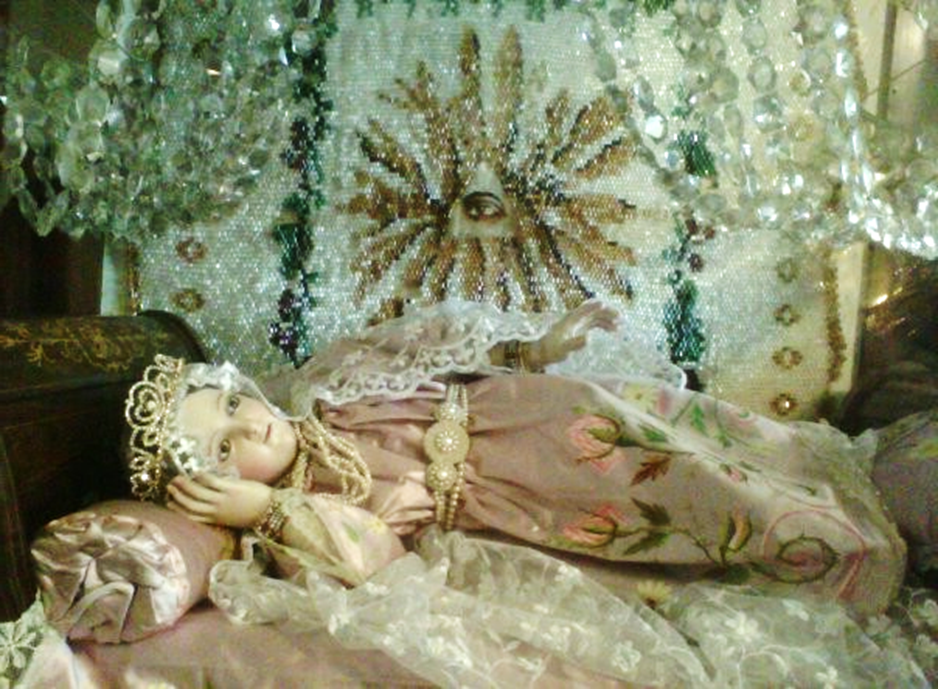
Original image of the "Divina Infantita" of Mexico City.

Mother Guadalupe then permitted Magdalena to promote devotion to the image, and shortly after that, many miracles were performed by the image. Including the conversion of a sinner, and the healing of a blind girl. Sister Magdalena continued to show great devotion to the image, making for it a crib, praying novenas dedicated to the Divine Infantess, and celebrating the feast days of the Child Virgin with great joy. The devotion was further spread by Mother Maria del Rosario Arrevillaga. who founded the Congregation of the Handmaids of the Child Mary; later Father Federico Salvador would found the Slaves of the Immaculate Child, which that order would merge into. Pope Gregory XVI would approve the devotion and the image, and enrich it with devotions.

== Gallery ==
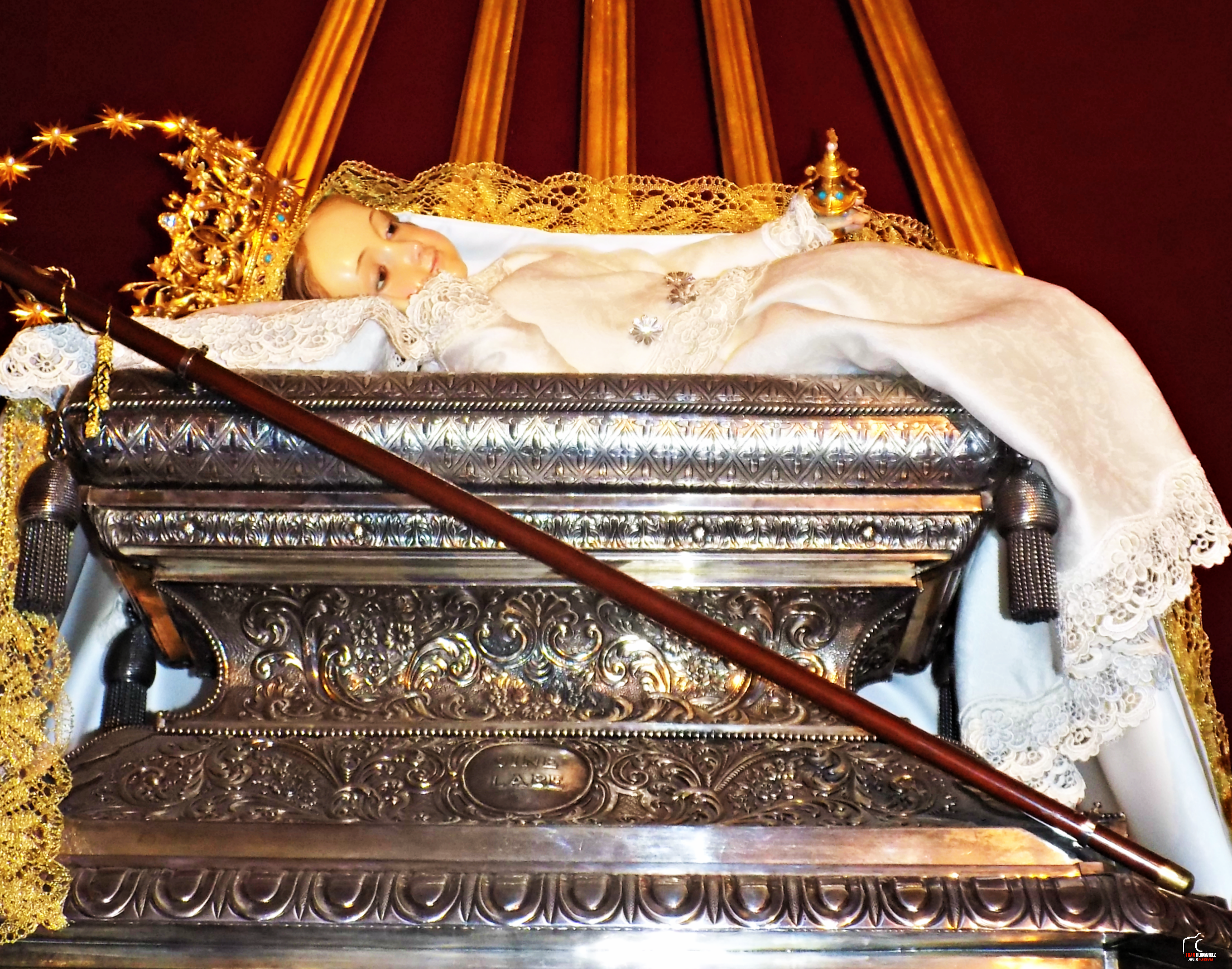
Image of the Divina Infantita venerated in the Parish of San Isidro Labrador in the City of El Ejido

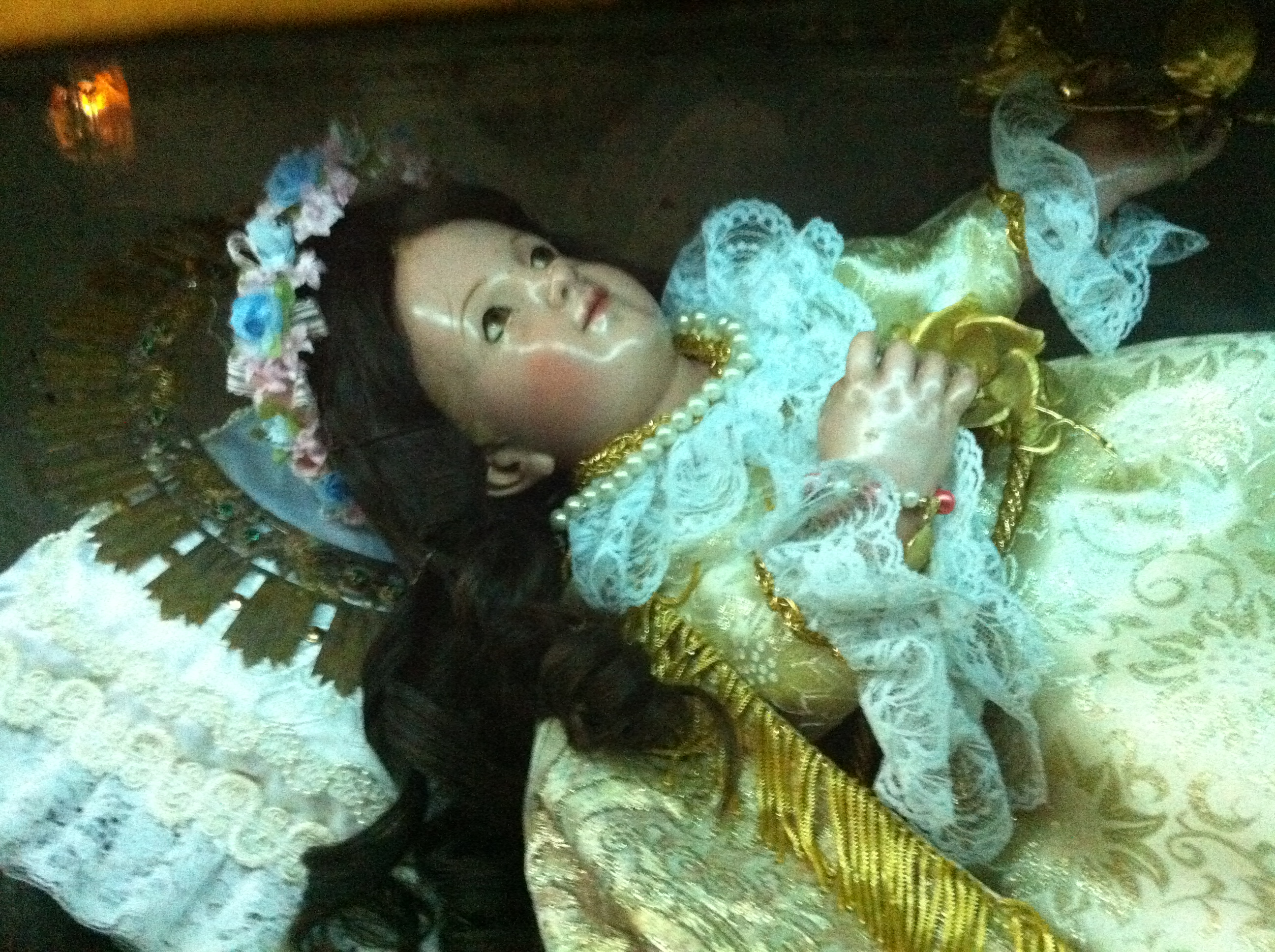
Infant Mary of Zapopan

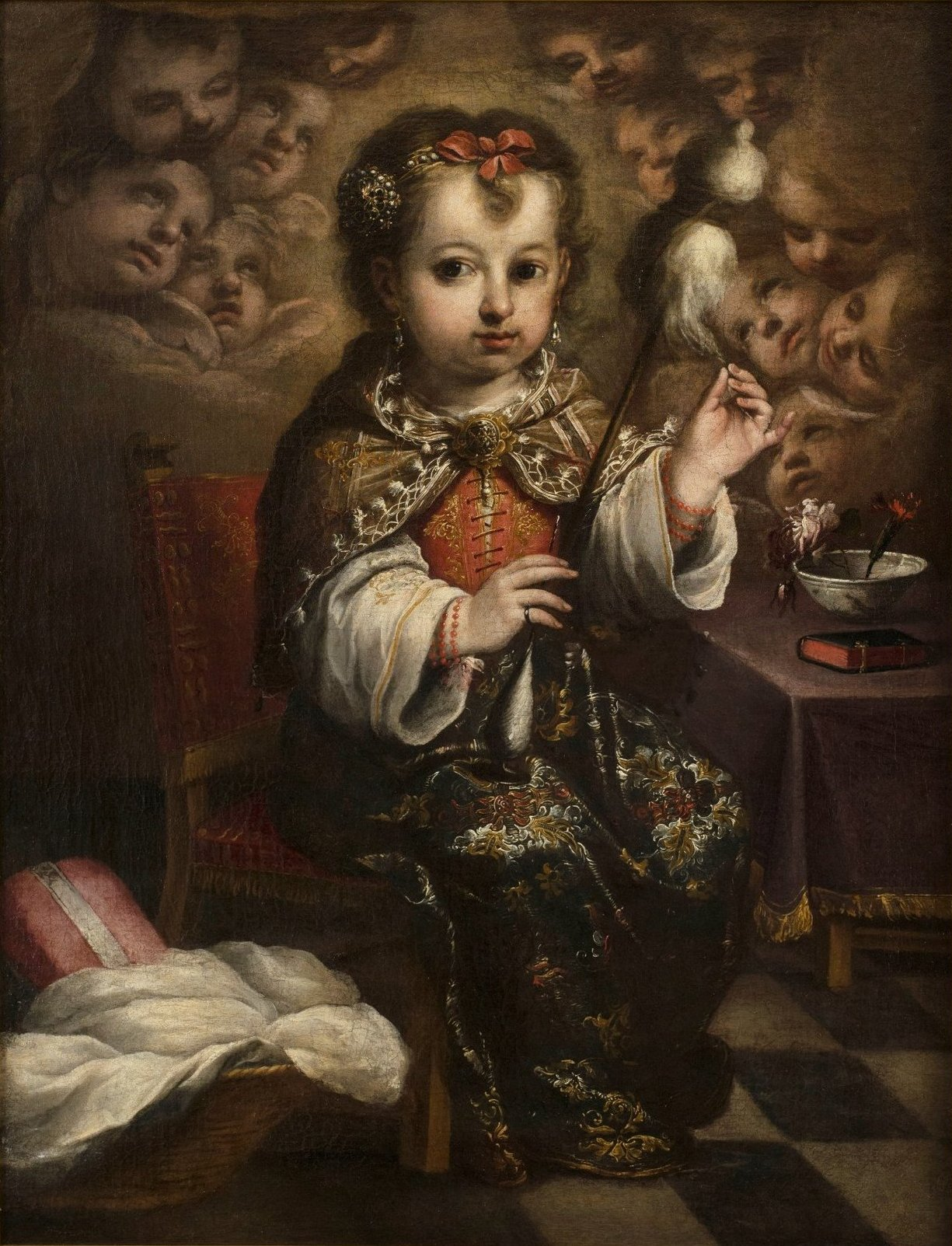
The Child Virgin Spinning by Juan Simón Gutiérrez

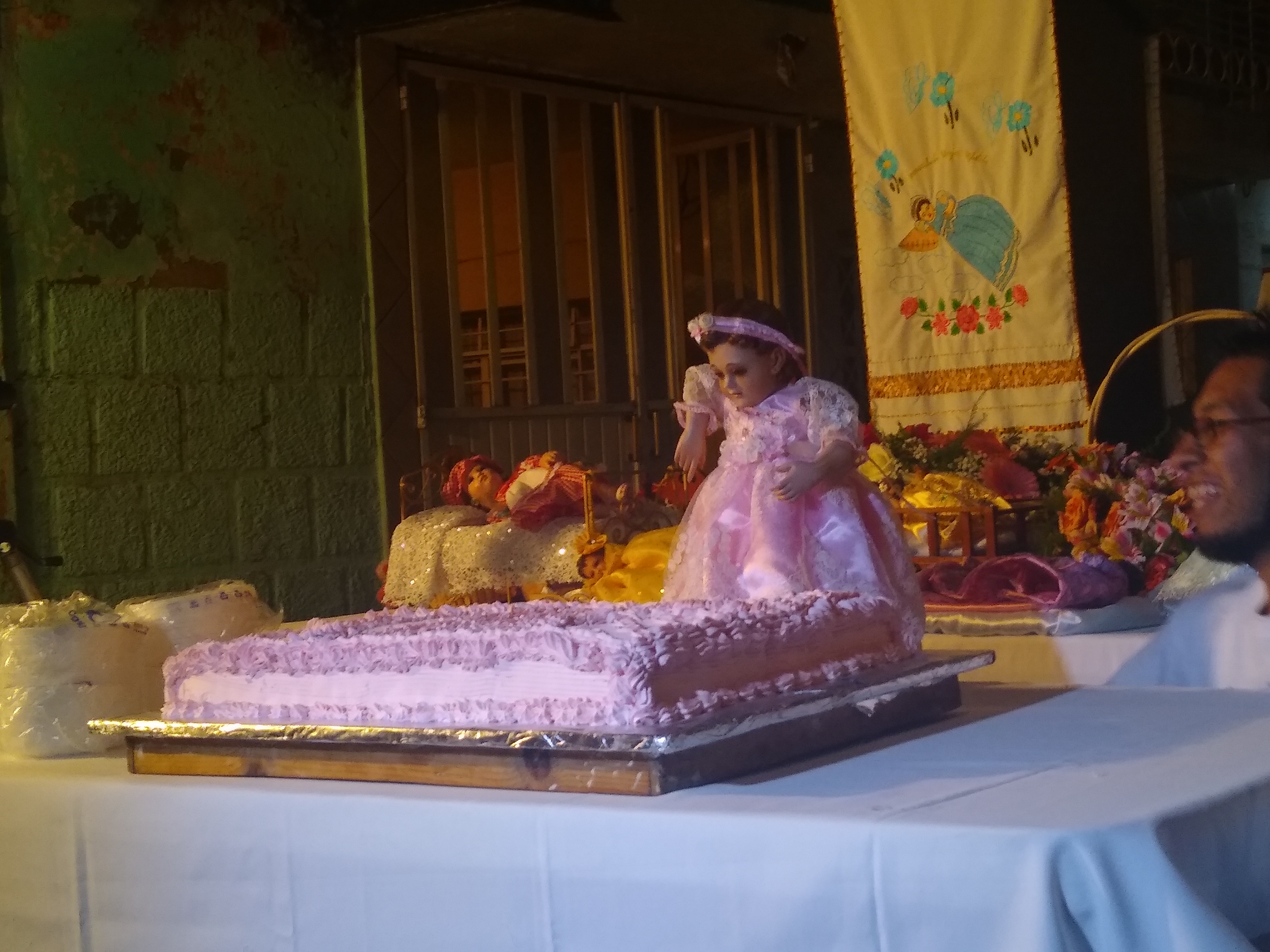
Feast of the Child Mary in Orizaba
