= Sisters of Charity of Saints Bartolomea Capitanio and Vincenza Gerosa =

Catholic female order

Sisters of Maria Bambina
- Sisters of Charity of Saints Bartolomea Capitanio and Vincenzia Gerosa
- Abbreviation: S.C.C.G.
- Formation: 1832; 194 years ago
- Founder: Saint Sr. Bartolomea Capitanio, S.C.C.G.
- Type: Centralized Religious Institute of Consecrated Life of Pontifical Right (for Women)
- Headquarters: Via S. Sofia, 13, 20122 Milano, Italy
- Members: 3,822 (2017)
- Superior General: Sr. Annamaria Viganò, S.C.C.G.
- Website: www.suoredimariabambina.org

The Institute of the Sisters of Charity of Saints Bartolomea Capitanio and Vincenza Gerosa (SCCG), also known as the Sisters of Maria Bambina (English: Sisters of Holy Child Mary), had its origins in a house which the people called "Conventino" (small convent) in Lovere, Italy. It was founded by a young woman of 26 named Bartolomea Capitanio in 1832. Bartolomea was helped in her project by Catherine Gerosa, a simple and wealthy lady of Lovere who later took the name of Sister Vincenza, in honor of St. Vincent de Paul.

Bartolomea died on 26 July 1833 just eight months after founding the Congregation. It was left to Catherine Gerosa, under the guidance of Father Bosio to carry on the work begun. Catherine was elected Mother Superior and went on to serve as Sister Vincenza. She along with Fr. Bosio introduced their charitable service in prisons and went on to build hospitals for the needy. She died on 29 June 1847 after a long illness and was succeeded by Sister Crocifissa Rivellini. Bartolomea and Vincenza were both canonized by the Roman Catholic Church in the year 1950 by Pope Pius XII. Vincenza's feast day is celebrated on 28 June. Today the institute has a worldwide presence with provinces in Europe, South-East Asia, Asia, Middle East, Africa, North America, South America.

== History ==
Saint Bartolomea Capitanio

Bartolomea Capitanio was born in Lovere into a family of modest means. Her mother decided to send her to the boarding school of the Poor Clares at the age of 11 where she acquired a deep piety. She finished her education with the Poor Clares when she was about 18. Soon she felt called and approached Fr. Angelo Bosio, her spiritual teacher for help. The approval of the Bishop of Brescia, Gabrio Nava allowed Fr. Angelo Bosio and the parish priest, Father Rusticiano Barboglio to buy a house. This came to be known as the "Conventino" (small convent) from where the congregation's work began.

Saint Vincenza Gerosa

About the same time Catherine Gerosa who had lost her family in rapid succession was left alone to manage the family business. She used her family's money to provide charitable works in the community. Catherine became involved in her Church parish, organizing a women's oratory with meetings and retreats, and founding a practical school to teach the poor girls of the community domestic work so as to improve their station in life. In one of these meetings, Catherine encountered Bartolomea Capitanio, and together they embarked on a new mission to start a hospital to care for those who could not afford medical care.

After having accomplished this they decided to extend their mission to establish a special religious institute with the objectives of providing assistance to the sick, free education for girls, Christian orphanages, and programs designed to promote youth welfare. To accomplish this mission, together they founded the Sisters of Charity in 1824. Together they consecrated themselves to God in a simple ceremony on 21 November 1832 in the presence of Fr. Rusticiano and Fr. Angelo Bosio at the altar of the parish church of St. George in Casa Gaia. Thus began the Congregation of the Sisters of Charity of Lovere.

== Maria Bambina ==
The wax image of Maria Bambina was modeled in 1735 by Sr. Isabella Chiara Formari, a Sister of the Poor Clares in Todi, Perugia. However devotion to the Divina Infantita pre-dates this. Over the main entrance of the Milan cathedral are the words in bronze letters: Mariae Nascenti, meaning to the Infant Mary.

Bishop Alberico Simonetta brought the waxen image of Maria Bambina to Milan on his return to his native town in 1738. In 1739 the image was entrusted to the Capuchin Sisters. In 1842 the image of the Infant Mary was donated to the sanctuario attached to the Sisters of Charity Generalate in Milan by the Franciscan Sisters of Todi. The image of the Maria Bambina was exposed for veneration only on 8 September, the Feast of Mary's Nativity. The Milanese began to call the sisters who staffed the Hospital of Ciceri the "Sisters of Maria Bambina".

Beginning in 1884, various miracles were attributed to the image. It became the custom to offer newly married couples a wedding gift of a small wax image of Maria Bambina. The devotion to Maria Bambina spread from the Milan area to the whole of Italy.

== Expansion ==
In Italy, where the Institute began in 1832, most of the communities founded were first in the Lombardo-Veneto region. Sisters were soon sent far outside Lovere and its neighbourhood, to care for orphans and girls: these were left to themselves in the wake of cholera and war, that marked the nineteenth century. The Community went to India in March 1860, where there developed 197 houses in eight provinces. In 1864 the sisters in India extended their work into what is now Bangladesh, where there are 18 communities. The sisters established the first of 31 communities in Myanmar in 1916.

== Pope John Paul I ==
In 1978, a group of four sisters — Elena Maggi, Vincenza Taffarel, Cecilia Tomaselli and Margherita Marin — took care of Pope John Paul I in the pontifical apartment at the Vatican throughout his duration as pope.
