= Domenico Carpinoni =

Italian painter

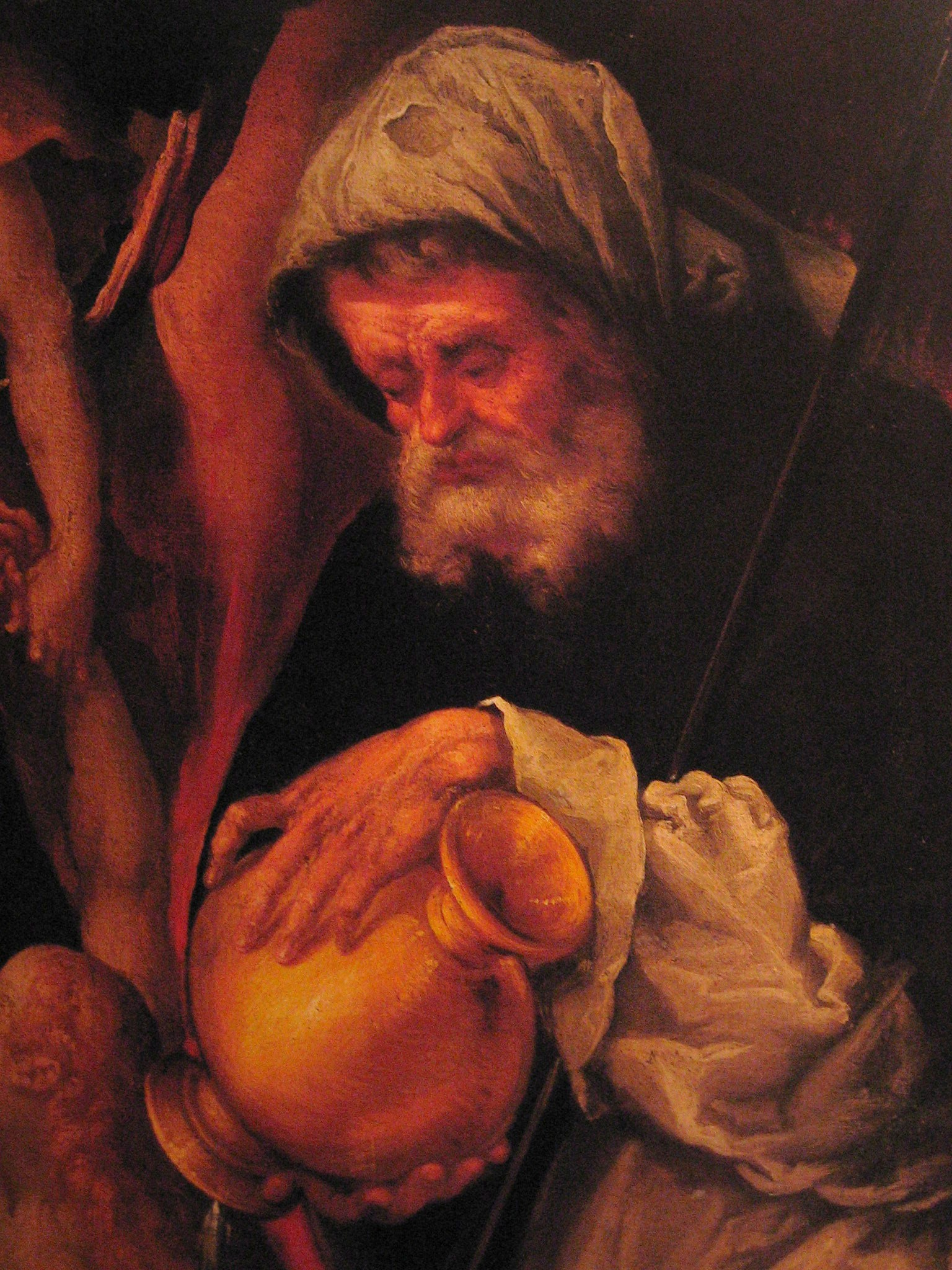
Domenico Carpinoni, The Virgin and St. Joseph intercede with the Trinity, (detail), Basilica Santa Maria Assunta, Clusone, Bergamo, Italy

Domenico Carpinoni (1566 – 11 June 1658) was an Italian painter of the Renaissance period. He was born at Clusone in the Valle Seriana. He was sent to Venice when young, and became a pupil of the younger Palma il Giovane. He painted a Birth of St. John the Baptist and Descent from the Cross for the principal church of Clusone a Transfiguration for the Chiesa di Monasterolo del Castello in the Valle Cavallina, and an Adoration of the Magi for the church of the Padri Osservanti at Lovere.
