= Enrico Ghezzi =

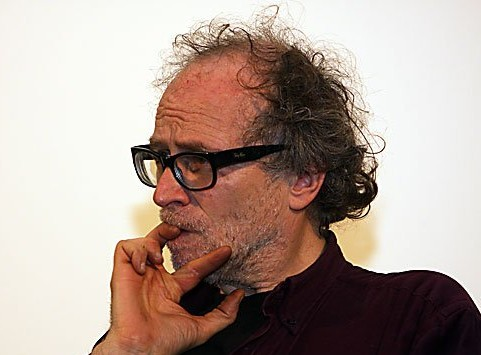
- Ghezzi in 2008
- Born: 26 June 1952 (age 73); Lovere, Italy
- Occupations: Film critic; documentarist; screenwriter

Enrico Ghezzi (born 26 June 1952) is an Italian film critic, essayist, documentarist, screenwriter and occasional actor.

== Career ==
Enrico Ghezzi was born in Lovere, in the province of Bergamo. He later moved to Genoa and enrolled at the University of Genoa. While there, he began attending the Filmstory film club, and in 1974, together with Teo Mora and Marco Giusti, he founded the cinema magazine Il Falcone Maltese. In 1978, he won a competition for programmer-director for the Genoa office of Rai 3. He then moved to Rome, where he worked on Rai 3's film programming from 1980 onwards.

Ghezzi created and supervised several well-known Italian television programs, such as Fuoriorario, Blob, and Schegge. Fuori Orario cose (mai) viste, which celebrated its 35th anniversary in 2024, has been regarded as a unique point of reference for several generations of viewers, film enthusiasts, critics, and filmmakers.

Ghezzi served as artistic director of the Taormina Film Fest from 1991 to 1998.

== Selected works ==
=== Director ===
- Le paure e la città – short doc (1979)
- Gelosi e tranquilli, episodio di Provvisorio quasi d'amore (1988)
- Hai-Kubrick – short (1999)
- 24 ore/10 secondi (neanche un canguro) – doc (2000)
- La sindrome di Varanasi – doc (2000)
- Con aura senz'aura: Viaggio ai confini dell'arte – doc (2003)
- Schegge di cinema e filosofia – doc (2007)
- Zaum - Andare a parare – TV series (2011)
- Egh c'è e non c'è - Carta bianca a Enrico Ghezzi – short doc (2012)
- Gli ultimi giorni dell'umanità - co-directed with Alessandro Gagliardo (2022)

=== Actor ===
- Blu cobalto, directed by Gianfranco Fiore (1985)
- Gelosi e tranquilli, an episode of Provvisorio quasi d'amore (1988)
- Barbablù, Barbablù, directed by Fabio Carpi (1989)
- Piccoli orrori, directed by Tonino De Bernardi (1995)
- Visioni di Palio, directed by Anton Giulio Onofri (2004)
- Chant d'hiver, directed by Otar Iosseliani (2015)

=== Writer ===
- Paura e desiderio (1995);
- Discorso su due piedi (1998);
- Il mezzo è l'aria (1997);
- cose (mai) dette (1996);

== Awards ==
- 2024 – Premio Omaggio al Maestro / La Milanesiana;
- 2022 – Premio Anno Uno;
- 2022 – Premio Cinematografico Stefano Pittaluga;
- 2019 – Premio dell'Utopia, Locarno Film Festival;
- 2018 – Premio Franco Quadri.
