= Vincenza Gerosa =

Italian Roman Catholic saint

Saint Vincenza Gerosa
- Painting

Religious
- Born: 29 October 1784; Lovere, Bergamo, Duchy of Milan
- Died: 28 June 1847 (aged 62); Lovere, Bergamo, Kingdom of Lombardy–Venetia
- Venerated in: Roman Catholic Church
- Beatified: 30 May 1926, Saint Peter's Basilica, Kingdom of Italy by Pope Pius XI
- Canonized: 18 May 1950, Saint Peter's Basilica, Vatican City by Pope Pius XII
- Major shrine: Our Lady of Charity Parish Church, Alfonso Cavite.
- Feast: 28 June; 18 May (Ambrosian Rite)
- Attributes: Religious habit
- Patronage: Sisters of Charity of Lovere

Vincenza Gerosa (29 October 1784 – 29 June 1847), born Caterina Gerosa, was an Italian Roman Catholic professed religious and the co-foundress of the Sisters of Charity of Lovere that she founded alongside Bartolomea Capitanio. Gerosa met Capitanio in 1824 and the two consecrated themselves to God in the name of educating children and tending to the poor of the Bergamo area.

Gerosa's canonization cause started under Pope Pius X on 4 December 1906 and Pope Pius XI later named her as Venerable in 1927. Gerosa was beatified under Pius XI in 1926 – alongside Capitanio – and Pope Pius XII later canonized the pair as saints in 1950.

== Life ==
Caterina Gerosa was born in Lovere on 29 October 1784 to Gianantonio Gerosa and Giacomina Macario as the first of four children – all girls including Francesca died around the same time as her father. Her mother died in 1814.

Gerosa was often reserved as a child and began her education under the instruction of the Benedictines at Gandino but her poor health prevented her from continuing her studies. This prompted her to leave and return to Lovere, where she spent time at the counter of the store her parents managed. Her father was in the tanning business and dealt in leather goods.

Gerosa lost her relations in rapid succession and was left alone to manage the business; she prayed, used her inheritance to provide charitable works in the area and became active in her local parish. Gerosa organized a women's group with meetings and spiritual retreats and even founded a practical school to teach poor girls of the area domestic work so as to improve their situation in life. She liked to tend to the grapevines for making wine and loved the idea that the grapes would go towards the sacramental wine used as part of the Eucharistic rite as the Blood of Christ.

In 1824 she met the schoolteacher Bartolomea Capitanio in Lovere. The pair founded a hospital funded with the assets of the estate of Gerosa's. In autumn 1832 the pair founded a religious institute based in Casa de Gaia. On 21 November 1832 – with Capitanio – she made her profession in the religious name of "Vincenza" in the parish of San Giorgio before the priest Rusticiano Barboglio and Angelo Bosio. Her friend and collaborator Capitanio died in 1833. Gerosa was tempted to return to her previous life at Lovere but agreed to continue the work the two started after her spiritual director encouraged her to do so.

Gerosa died on 29 June 1847 in Lovere after an extended illness claimed her. In 2005 there were 5068 religious in a total of 447 houses in nations such as Japan and the United Kingdom; the motherhouse of the order is located at 13 Via Santa Sofia in Milan.

== Sainthood ==
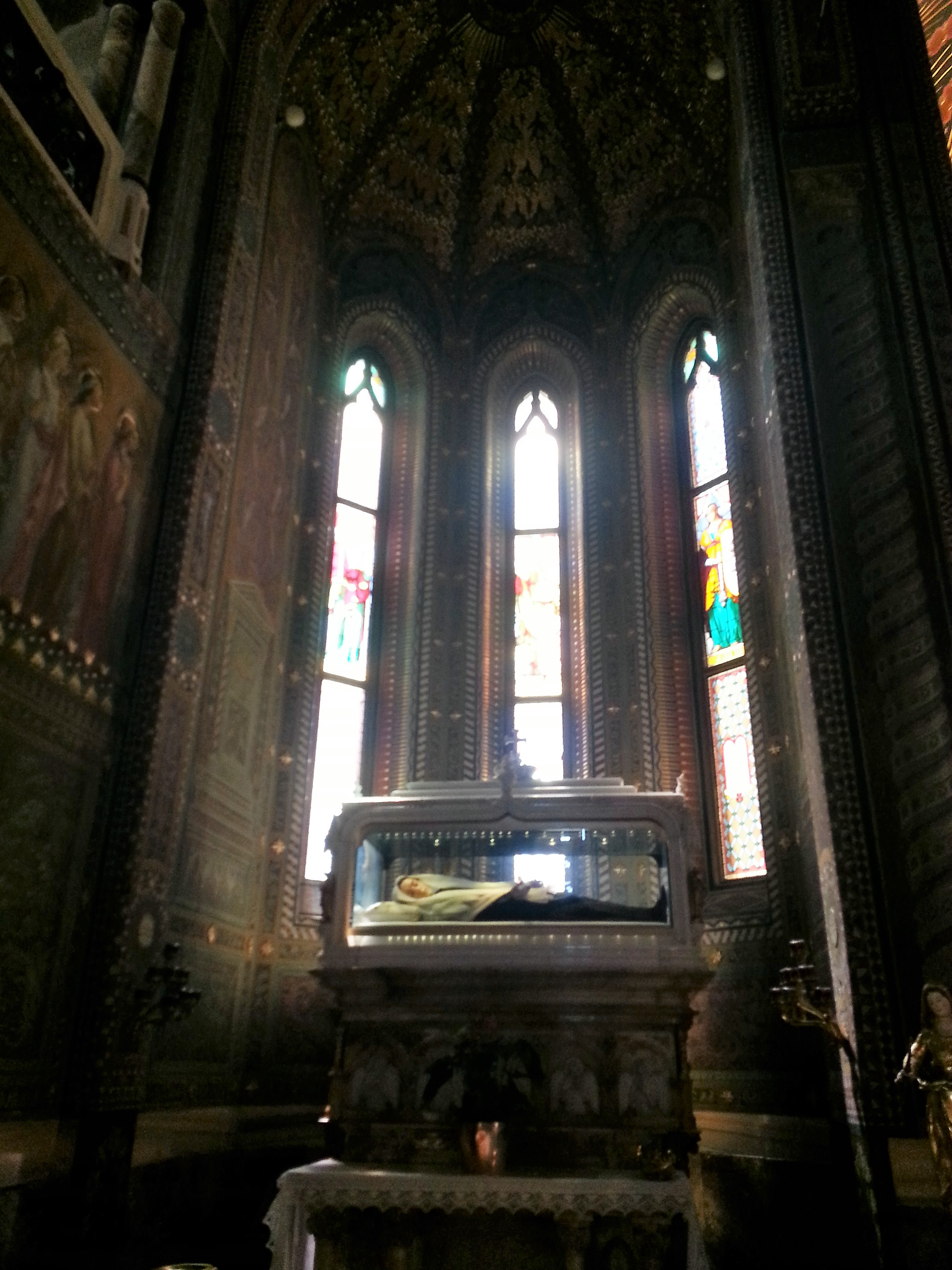
Tomb

The canonization process opened under Pope Pius X on 4 December 1906 and she became titled as a Servant of God while the confirmation of her life of heroic virtue – on 24 July 1927 – allowed for Pope Pius XI to name Gerosa as Venerable. That same pontiff beatified Gerosa and her friend Capitanio in Saint Peter's Basilica on 30 May 1926 while Pope Pius XII went on to canonize the duo on 18 May 1950.

== Sources ==
- Attwater, Donald; Catherine Rachel John (1993). The Penguin Dictionary of Saints (3rd ed.). New York: Penguin Books. ISBN 0140513124.
