= Taormina Film Fest =

Annual film festival held in Taormina, Sicily, Italy

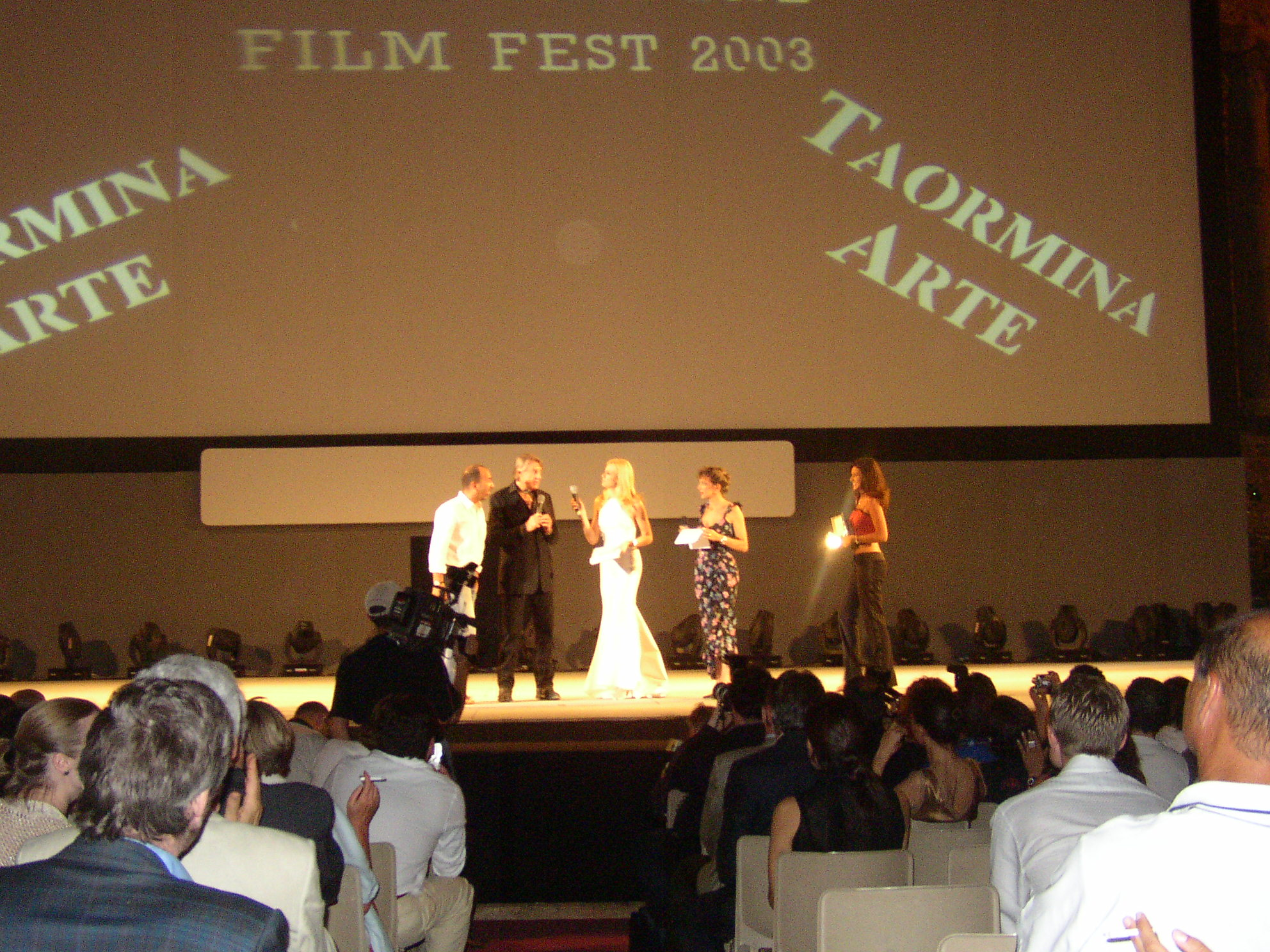
- Director Joel Schumacher at Taormina Film Fest in 2003
- Location: Taormina, Italy
- Language: International
- Website: taorminafilmfest.com

Taormina Film Fest (TFF) is an annual film festival that takes place at Taormina, Sicily, Italy, in July. It was established in 1955 in Messina, and in 1957 became Rassegna Cinematografica Internazionale di Messina e Taormina, until it moved permanently to Taormina in 1971. It had a succession of names before adopting its current name.

The festival stages the annual Nastro d'Argento (Silver Ribbon) film awards.

== History ==
The festival was established in Messina, Sicily, in 1955, and in 1957 grew to include Taormina, at the same time introducing the "Cariddi d'Argento" (Silver Charybdis) awards. It was then named the Rassegna Cinematografica Internazionale di Messina e Taormina

From 1957 to 1980 it hosted the David di Donatello film awards, named after Donatello's statue of David, which increased the prestige of the festival.

In 1964, the first four days of the film were hosted in Messina, and Taormina the last four. In 1969, director/president Giuseppe Campione (1969—1970) aimed to promote films with cultural depth and social relevance, with a subtitle of the festival "Festival for International Film Cooperation".

In 1970 the Festival internazionale del cinema di Taormina was created, which opened in Taormina for the first time. Since 1971 the festival has usually been held in the Teatro Antico (Ancient Theatre) in Taormina. Also in 1970, the inaugural Gran Premio delle Nazioni was awarded, in that year to Sydney Pollack. On the 10th anniversary of the Festival delle Nazione (Festival of Nations), the Charybdis was awarded to the Australian film Picnic at Hanging Rock, directed by Peter Weir.

From 1981, under the director Guglielmo Biraghi, the Festival dell Nazione was dropped. The top three films were awarded gold, silver and bronze Cariddi, and another award, the Maschere di Polifemo (Masks of Polyphemus) (gold, silver, and bronze) was created for the best interpretations. In 1984 the Nastri d'Argento (Silver Ribbons) were introduced.

In 1983 the EPT (Ente Provinciale per il Turismo), which had sponsored the event since the start, stopped its patronage, and the festival was renamed Taormina FilmFest (under the newly established Taormina Arte).

Enrico Ghezzi, director from 1991 to 1998, renamed the show TaoFest, and changed the focus and activities of the festival quite radically, with a focus on arthouse films, discussion, and study. In 1997 he held it in the convention building in Taormina under the name XXVII Festival internazionale del cinema di Taormina.

From 2002 it became the Taormina BNL Film Fest, sponsored by the Banca Nazionale del Lavoro. However, BNL dropped its €500,000 sponsorship before the 2006 event, much to director Felice Laudadio's disgust at the late decision, taken in January. In 2006 the festival had to run without its international competition, and cancel invitations to the more expensive stars.

Laudadio (1999—2006) was responsible for increasing the reputation and profile of the festival internationally. His innovations included doing away with the Cariddi/Charybdis and the Maschere di Polifemo/Masks of Polyphemus and replacing them with awards given by sponsors: the Diamond Awards (from 2000) and the Taormina Arte Awards for Cinematic Excellence (from 2003). The Silver Ribbons were again hosted from 2000.

Over the years Taormina Film Fest has hosted over the years many stars of international cinema: Elizabeth Taylor, Marlene Dietrich, Sophia Loren, Cary Grant, Robert De Niro, Colin Firth, Marlon Brando, Charlton Heston, Audrey Hepburn, Gregory Peck, Tom Cruise, Melanie Griffith, and Antonio Banderas, among others.

== Description ==
As of 2023, the festival runs for nine days, and includes film screenings in three locations (Teatro Antico, Palazzo dei Congressi, and Casa del Cinema) and masterclasses. Premieres and new films are screened in the Ancient Theatre, while the other two locations are used mainly for retrospective screenings of popular classics. The Nastri D'Argento Awards are held on the last evening of the festival.

== Artistic directors ==
The directors of Taormina Film Fest have been:

- 1955: Arturo Arena
- 1956—1968: Michele Ballo
- 1969—1970: Giuseppe Campione
- 1971—1980: Gian Luigi Rondi
- 1981—1990: Guglielmo Biraghi
- 1991—1998: Enrico Ghezzi
- 1999—2006: Felice Laudadio
- 2007—2011: Deborah Young
- 2012—2013: Mario Sesti
- 2013—2016: Agnus Dei Production, headed by Tiziana Rocca
- 2017: Tao Arte ("home edition")
- 2018—2019: Gianvito Casadonte (actor) and Silvia Bizio (journalist) Sponsored by VideoBank
- 2020: Leo Gullotta and Francesco Calogero
- 2021–2022: Francesco Alò, Alessandra De Luca, and Federico Pontiggia
- 2023: Beatrice Venezi, with Barrett Wissman as co-artistic director

== Awards ==
Separate from the Nastro d'Argento, the festival also awards other prizes:

- Taormina Arte Award (previously Cariddi d'Oro)
- Premio Cariddi Taormina FilmFest
- Premio Kineo Taormina FilmFest (special prize)

== Past recipients ==
=== Awards ===
David di Donatello

- Charles Laughton (1958)
- Martin Bregman (1976)
- Dino De Laurentiis (1957, 1961, 1965, 1966, 1968)
- Isabelle Adjani (1975, 1976)
- Julie Andrews (1966)
- Brigitte Bardot (1961)
- Ingrid Bergman (1957)
- Claudia Cardinale (1961, 1968, 1972)
- Julie Christie (1967)
- Faye Dunaway (1968)
- Susan Hayward (1959)
- Audrey Hepburn (1960, 1962, 1965)
- Sophia Loren (1961, 1964, 1965, 1970, 1974)
- Melina Mercouri (1965)
- Mia Farrow (1969)
- Marilyn Monroe (1958)
- Lana Turner (1966)
- Barbra Streisand (1969, 1974)
- Elizabeth Taylor (1960, 1967, 1972)
- Liv Ullmann (1974)
- Lino Ventura (1974)
- Jodie Foster (1977)
- Goldie Hawn (1970)
- Maria Schneider (1973)
- Shelley Winters (1977)
- Stanley Kubrick (1969, 1977)
- John Schlesinger (1970, 1972, 1980)
- Martin Scorsese (1977)
- Tatum O'Neal (1974)
- Geraldine Page (1963)
- Carlo Ponti (1964, 1965, 1967)
- Jay Presson Allen (1980)
- Vanessa Redgrave (1972)
- Franco Rossi (1961)
- Nino Rota (1977)
- Albert S. Ruddy (1973)
- Sam Spiegel (1958, 1964)
- Ray Stark (1980)
- Darryl F. Zanuck (1963)
- Jack L. Warner (1957, 1965)

Taormina Arte Award

- Melanie Griffith (2000)
- Jennifer Jason Leigh (2001)
- Hugh Grant (2002)
- Isabelle Huppert (1980, 2002)
- Judi Dench (2004)
- Gina Lollobrigida (1963, 1969, 2001)
- Miriam Makeba (2001)
- Greta Scacchi (2002)
- Hanna Schygulla (1980, 2007)
- Mira Sorvino (2004)
- Joel Schumacher (2003)
- Margarethe von Trotta (2004)
- Irene Papas (2005)
- Charlotte Rampling (2005)
- André Téchiné (2007)
- Paul Schrader (2008)
- Catherine Deneuve (2009)
- Colin Firth (2010)
- Monica Bellucci (2011)
- Sophia Loren (2012)
- Terry Gilliam (2012)
- Russell Crowe (2013)
- Meg Ryan (2013)
- Claudia Cardinale (2014)
- Paz Vega (2014)
- Asia Argento (2015)
- Rupert Everett (2015)
- Richard Gere (2015)
- Miguel Bosè (2016)

Nastro d'argento

- Steven Spielberg (1999)
- Dante Spinotti (2000)
- Vittorio Storaro (1999) (Note: He won also Taormina Arte Award in 2001.)
- Ennio Morricone (1999, 2000, 2001, 2007)

=== Honours ===
Actors

- Marlon Brando
- Jack Nicholson
- Liam Neeson
- Richard Burton
- Al Pacino
- Tom Cruise
- Robert Redford
- Michael Douglas
- Sean Connery
- Dustin Hoffman
- Warren Beatty
- Robert Duvall
- Cary Grant
- Henry Fonda
- Peter O'Toole
- Laurence Olivier
- Jack Lemmon
- Walter Matthau
- Marcello Mastroianni
- Rex Harrison
- Charlton Heston
- Rod Steiger
- Antonio Banderas
- Gary Cooper
- Willem Dafoe
- Yves Montand
- Jean-Louis Trintignant
- Matt Dillon
- Alain Delon
- Vittorio Gassman
- Giancarlo Giannini
- Fred Astaire
- Philippe Noiret
- Olivia Hussey (1969)
- Jennifer Jones (1975)
- Deborah Kerr (1959)

Directors and producers

- Francis Ford Coppola
- Martin Scorsese
- David Lean
- Peter Weir
- Pedro Almodóvar
- Steven Spielberg
- Miloš Forman
- Akira Kurosawa
- Stephen Frears
- Roman Polanski
- Sydney Pollack
- Paul Schrader
- Joel Schumacher
- Ingmar Bergman
- John Schlesinger
- Jane Campion
- Robert Altman
- Michelangelo Antonioni
- Bob Fosse
- John Huston
- Norman Jewison
- Stanley Kramer
- Vittorio De Sica
- Federico Fellini
- Robert Bresson
- Richard Brooks
- Milena Canonero
- Sofia Coppola
- Sergio Leone
- Joseph Losey
- Gillo Pontecorvo
- Andrej Tarkovskij
- Hugh Hudson
- Giuseppe Tornatore
- Krzysztof Zanussi
- Franco Zeffirelli
- Luchino Visconti
- Billy Wilder
- Mike Leigh
