= Theenmura =

Traditional banquet in Kerala, India

Theenmura also spelled theen mura is the traditional banquet of Saint Thomas Christians of Kerala, India. It is a non-vegetarian form of festive main meal and significantly differs from the vegetarian banquet sadhya in dishes and course of serving. It is typically served in Christian festivals such as Christmas, Easter, Nalpiravi, Pindikuthi Perunnal, Dukrana and family celebrations of Christians such as marriage, baptism, first Communion and engagement.

A typical theenmura may include, but is not limited to, cake with wine, meat cutlet with challas (a kind of pickled onion salad), appam, parotta, mutton stew, fish mollee, boiled rice, Malabar matthi curry, and beef vindaloo.

== See also ==
- Saint Thomas Christians
- Cuisine of Kerala
- South Indian cuisine
