= Elena Fanchini =

Italian alpine skier (1985–2023)

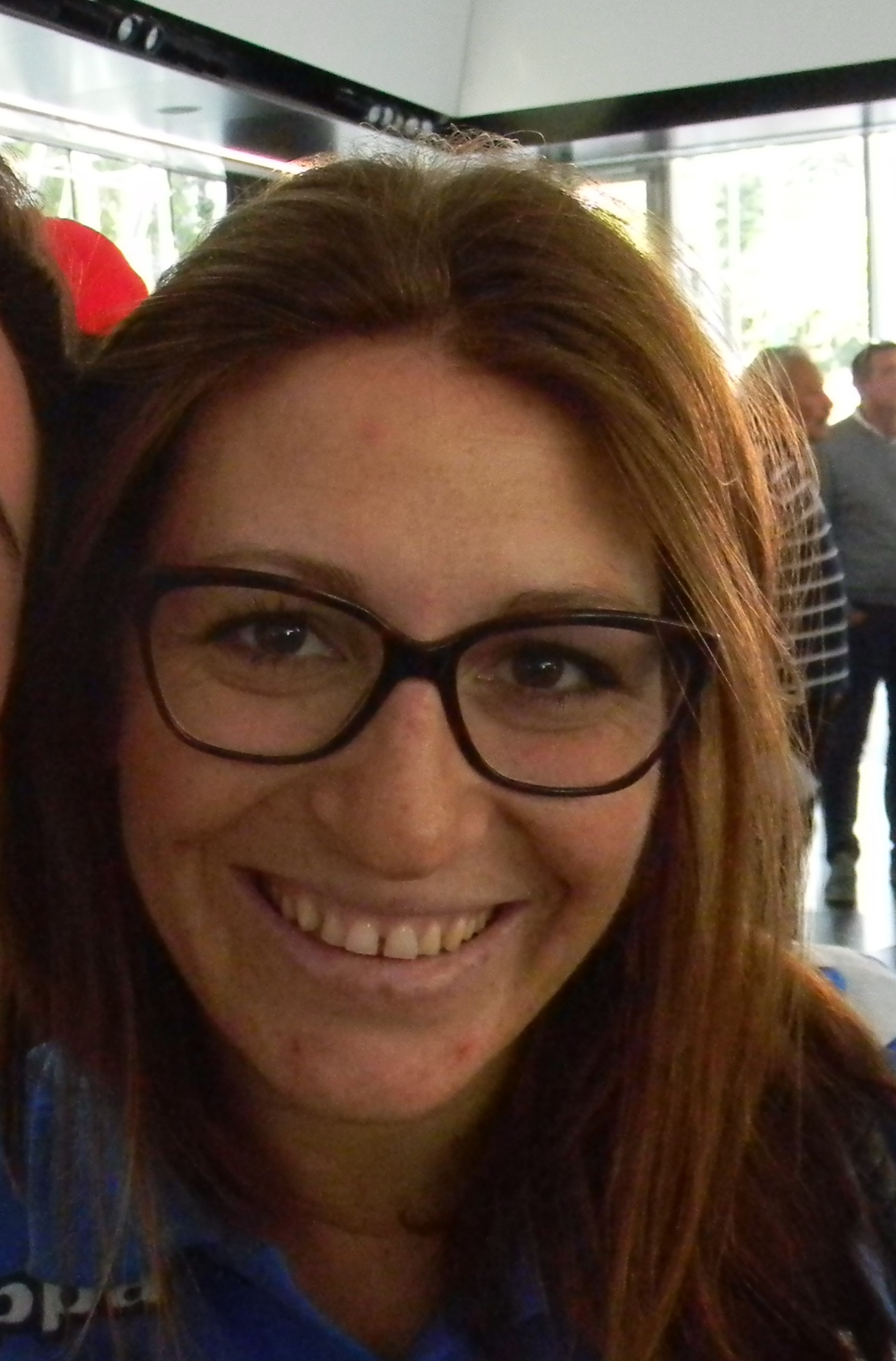
- Fanchini in 2014

Personal information
- Born: 30 April 1985 Lovere, Bergamo, Lombardy, Italy
- Died: 8 February 2023 (aged 37) Pian Camuno, Italy
- Height: 164 cm (5 ft 5 in)
- Website: sorellefanchini.it

Skiing career
- Sport: Alpine skiing
- Club: G.S. Fiamme Gialle
- Disciplines: Downhill, Super-G
- World Cup debut: 6 January 2005 (age 19)

Olympics
- Teams: 3 – (2006-2014)
- Medals: 0

World Championships
- Teams: 6 – (2005-2007, 2011-2017)
- Medals: 1 (0 gold)

World Cup
- Seasons: 13 – (2005–2008, 2010–2018)
- Wins: 2 – (2 DH)
- Podiums: 4 – (4 DH)
- Overall titles: 0 – (17th in 2015)
- Discipline titles: 0 – (5th in DH, 2015)
Medal record
World Cup race podiums
Event / 1st / 2nd / 3rd; Downhill / 2 / 0 / 2
Women's alpine skiing
Representing Italy
World Championships
Silver medal – second place	2005 Bormio	Downhill

Elena Fanchini (30 April 1985 – 8 February 2023) was an Italian World Cup alpine ski racer. Born in Val Camonica, she focused on the speed events of downhill and super-G. Her younger sisters Nadia and Sabrina also raced on the Italian team.

== Biography ==
Fanchini won two World Cup races in downhill 9 years apart and won a silver medal at the 2005 world championships. She represented Italy at three Winter Olympics and six World Championships.

== Illness and death ==
On 12 January 2018, Fanchini announced that she would not compete in the 2018 Winter Olympics at Pyeongchang in order to undergo cancer treatment. That November, she was preparing to return to the World Cup; during training in the United States at Copper Mountain, Colorado, she fell and suffered a fracture of a finger of the hand and a distortion-bruising trauma to the left knee, with fracture of the proximal fibula. The injury forced her to return to Italy and miss the 2019 season.

On 22 April 2020, sisters Elena and Nadia Fanchini announced their retirement from racing.

At age 37, Fanchini died from colon cancer on 8 February 2023 at Pian Camuno.

== World Cup results ==
=== Season standings ===
Season	Age	Overall	Slalom	Giant slalom	Super-G	Downhill	Combined
2005	19	75	—	—	45	32	—
2006	20	41	—	—	47	12	—
2007	21	77	—	—	50	30	—
2008	22	45	—	—	34	23	39
2009	23						
2010	24	53	—	—	26	24	—
2011	25	28	—	—	25	12	—
2012	26	36	—	—	32	13	18
2013	27	62	—	—	47	22	37
2014	28	33	—	—	42	10	—
2015	29	17	—	—	19	5	—
2016	30	51	—	—	24	24	—
2017	31	57	—	—	50	16	—
2018	32	70	—	—	40	27	—

=== Race podiums ===
- 2 wins – (2 DH)
- 4 podiums – (4 DH); 25 top tens (20 DH, 5 SG)

Season	Date	Location	Discipline	Place
2006	2 December 2005	Lake Louise, Canada	Downhill	1st
2014	29 November 2013	Beaver Creek, United States	Downhill	3rd
2014	6 December 2013	Lake Louise, Canada	Downhill	3rd
2015	16 January 2015	Cortina d'Ampezzo, Italy	Downhill	1st

== World Championship results ==
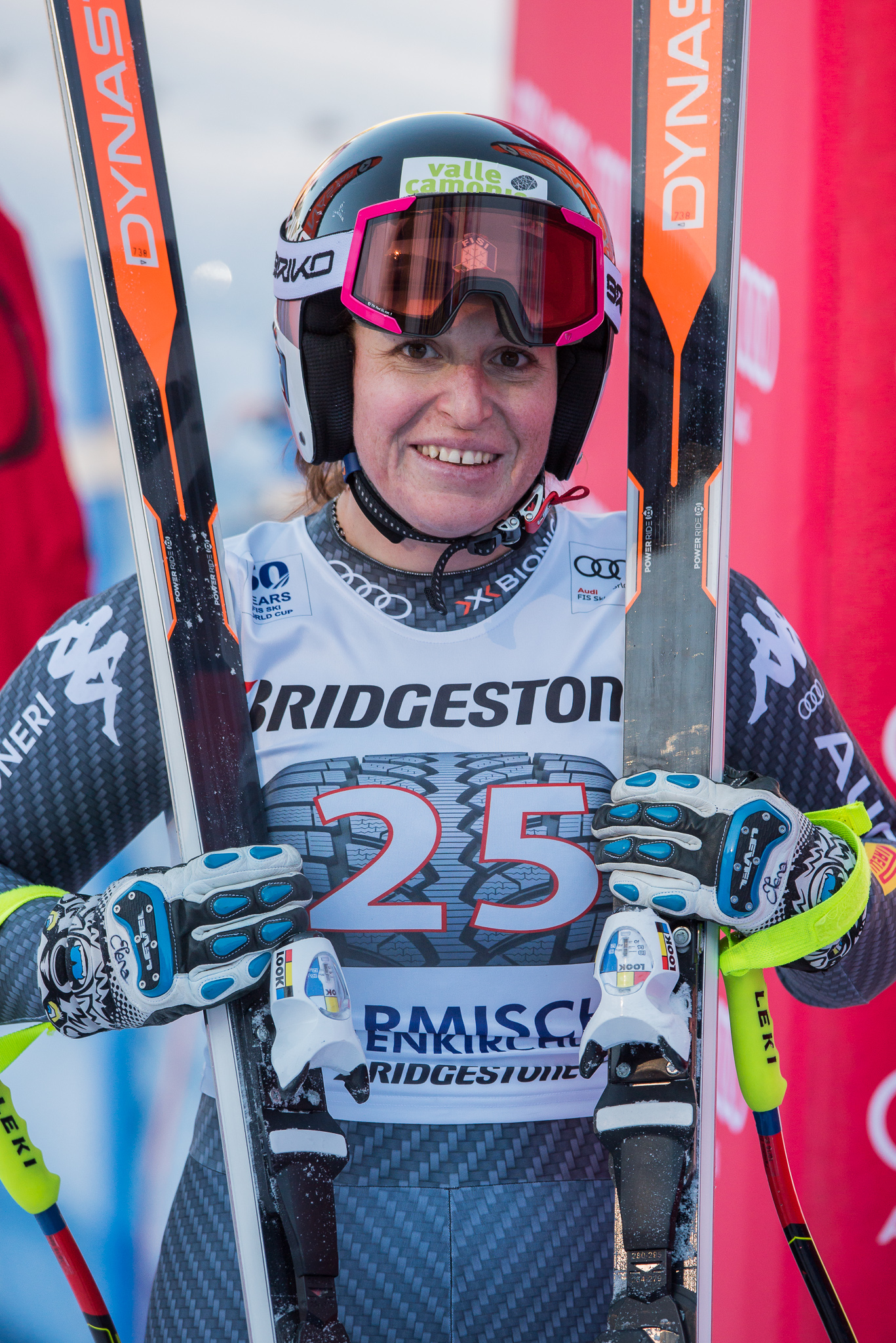
Fanchini at Garmisch-Partenkirchen in January 2017

Year	Age	Slalom	Giant slalom	Super-G	Downhill	Combined
2005	19	—	DNF1	—	2	20
2007	21	—	—	31	27	DNS2
2009	23					
2011	25	—	—	18	16	—
2013	27	—	—	—	9	15
2015	29	—	—	—	26	16
2017	31	—	—	—	14	—

== Olympic results ==
Year	Age	Slalom	Giant slalom	Super-G	Downhill	Combined
2006	20	—	—	DNF	29	—
2010	24	—	—	14	DNF	—
2014	28	—	—	—	12	DNS2

== National titles ==
Elena Fanchini won 7 national titles.

- Italian Alpine Ski Championships
  - Downhill: 2005, 2007, 2010, 2011, 2012, 2015, 2016 (7)
