= Bartolomea Capitanio =

Italian Roman Catholic saint

Saint Bartolomea Capitanio

Religious
- Born: 13 January 1807; Lovere, Bergamo, Napoleonic Kingdom of Italy
- Died: 26 July 1833 (aged 26); Lovere, Bergamo, Kingdom of Lombardy–Venetia
- Venerated in: Roman Catholic Church
- Beatified: 30 May 1926, Saint Peter's Basilica, Kingdom of Italy by Pope Pius XI
- Canonized: 18 May 1950, Saint Peter's Basilica, Vatican City by Pope Pius XII
- Feast: 26 July; 18 May (Ambrosian Rite)
- Patronage: Teachers; Sisters of Charity of Lovere; Lovere

Bartolomea Capitanio (13 January 1807 – 26 July 1833) was an Italian Roman Catholic professed religious and the co-foundress of the Sisters of Charity of Lovere that she established with Vincenza Gerosa. Capitanio's rather short life was dedicated to the educational needs of children and the poor and she served as a teacher for most of her life while using her order to achieve this aim.

Pope Pius XI beatified her in 1926 and Pope Pius XII canonized her - alongside her old friend Gerosa - in 1950.

== Life ==
Bartolomea Capitanio was born in Bergamo in 1807 as the eldest of seven children to the merchant Modesto Capitanio and his second wife Caterina Casnossi; she had two brothers and four sisters. All her siblings died as infants except for Camilla. Her father ran a business dealing in grain and also a small greengrocers. Her mother educated her children with great care and also a deep faith. Her father soon became an alcoholic and became aggressive at home.

Capitanio was educated at the convent of the Poor Clares and Lovere after her mother sent her there in 1818; she remained there as a teacher, until 1825 when she returned home. The girl would have entered the order of those nuns but her parents would not consent to her request but approached her spiritual director, the priest Angelo Bosio, for guidance. Reading the life of Aloysius Gonzaga enlightened and inspired her and she attempted to emulate his virtues. After the conclusion of her studies she opened a private school for girls where she encouraged the devotion of the "Six Sundays of Saint Aloysius" that Pope Clement XII had approved back in 1739.

The Austrian government - which controlled the northern Italian region at the time - issued her a teacher's diploma upon her passing the requisite examination in 1822; she began teaching first grade schoolgirls at her old school though left on 18 July 1824 to go back home and teach at the local school. In 1824 she first became acquainted with Vincenza Gerosa who also happened to hail from Lovere. The two became close friends and together they embarked on a mission to start a hospital to care for those who could not afford medical care. They co-founded their own religious order as a means to teach children and nurse the sick. The Bishop of Brescia allowed for Bosio and Father Rusticiano Barboglio to purchase a house for the two women to found their order at. On the Feast of the Presentation - on 21 February 1832 - the pair dedicated themselves to God (in Bosio and Barboglio's presence at San Giorgio in Casa Gaia) and began to live a communal life in accordance with the order the two founded. The formal founding was on 21 November 1832 after the women began their work for the founding the previous 26 April 1831.

Bartolomea Capitanio died from tuberculosis in 1833 in Lovere.

=== School ===
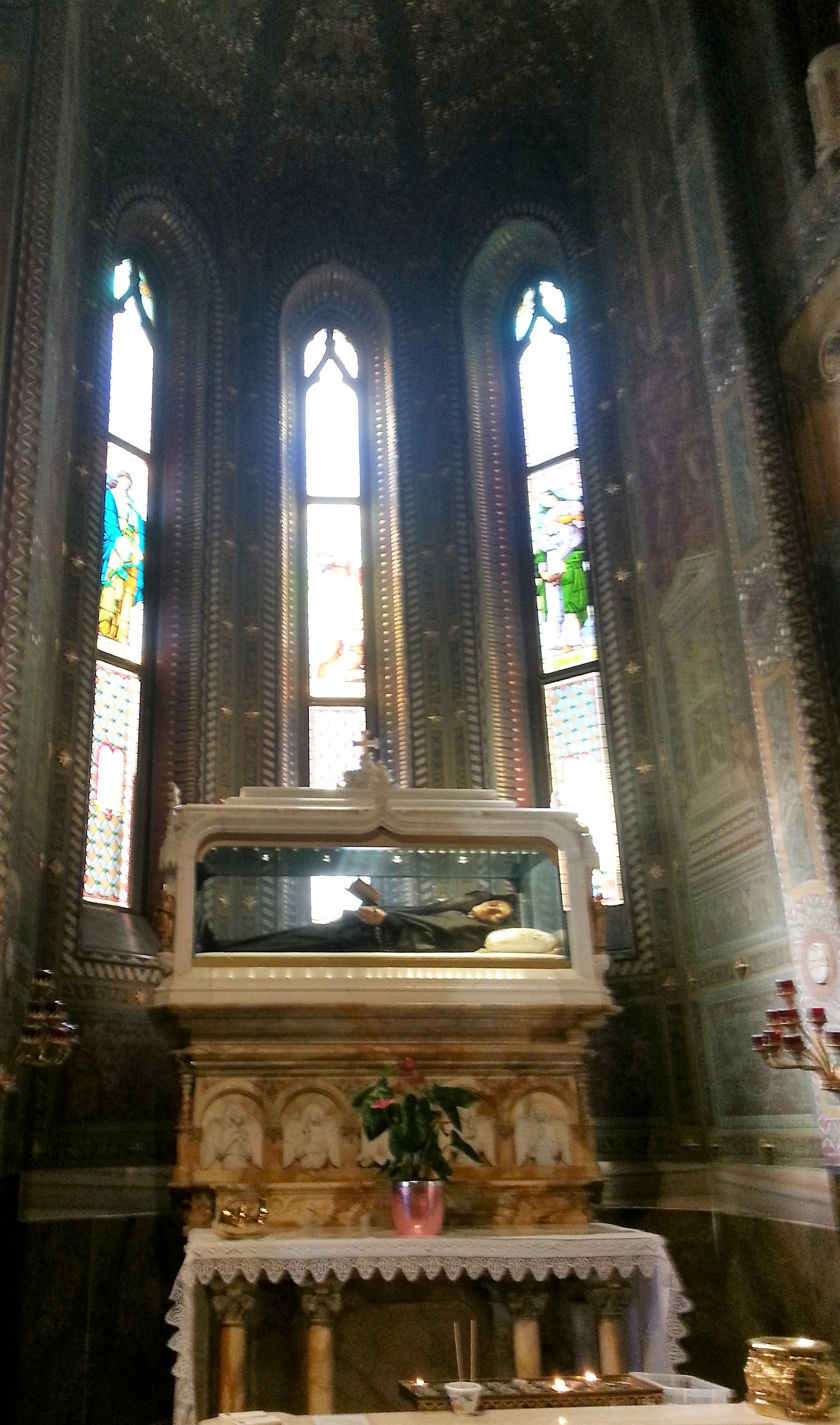
Tomb

Bartolomea Capitanio is also the name of a school in the Amapá state in Brazil.

== Sainthood ==
The beatification process started under Pope Pius IX on 8 March 1866 and she became titled as a Servant of God while the confirmation of her heroic virtue allowed for Pope Leo XIII to name her as Venerable on 6 January 1902; Pope Pius XI beatified her on 30 May 1926 while Pope Pius XII later canonized her as a saint - alongside Vincenza Gerosa - on 18 May 1950.

== Sources ==
- Attwater, Donald; Catherine Rachel John (1993). The Penguin Dictionary of Saints (3rd ed.). New York: Penguin Books. ISBN 0140513124.
