= Pian Camuno =

- Comune
- Comune di Pian Camuno
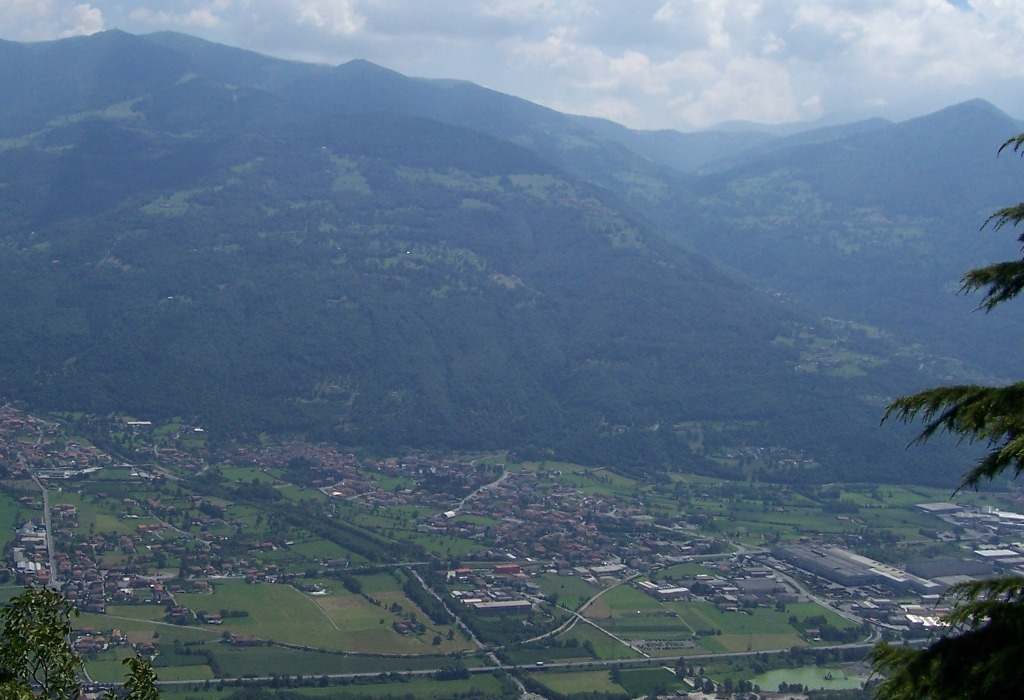
- Pian Camuno

- Location within Italy Location within Lombardy
- Coordinates: 45°50′41″N 10°9′7″E
- Country: Italy
- Region: Lombardy
- Province: Province of Brescia (BS)
- Frazioni: Beata, Solato, Vissone, Montecampione

Government
  - Mayor: Giorgio Giovanni Ramazzini

Area
  - Total: 10.95 km^{2} (4.23 sq mi)
- Elevation: 244 m (801 ft)

Population (30 November 2016)
  - Total: 4,684
  - Density: 427.8/km^{2} (1,108/sq mi)
- Demonym: Piancamunesi
- Time zone: UTC+1 (CET)
  - Summer (DST): UTC+2 (CEST)
- Postal code: 25050
- Dialing code: 0364
- Patron saint: St. Anthony the Great
- Website: Official website

Pian Camuno (Camunian: Pià; locally Plà) is a comune in the province of Brescia, in Lombardy. It is situated in the lower part of Val Camonica.

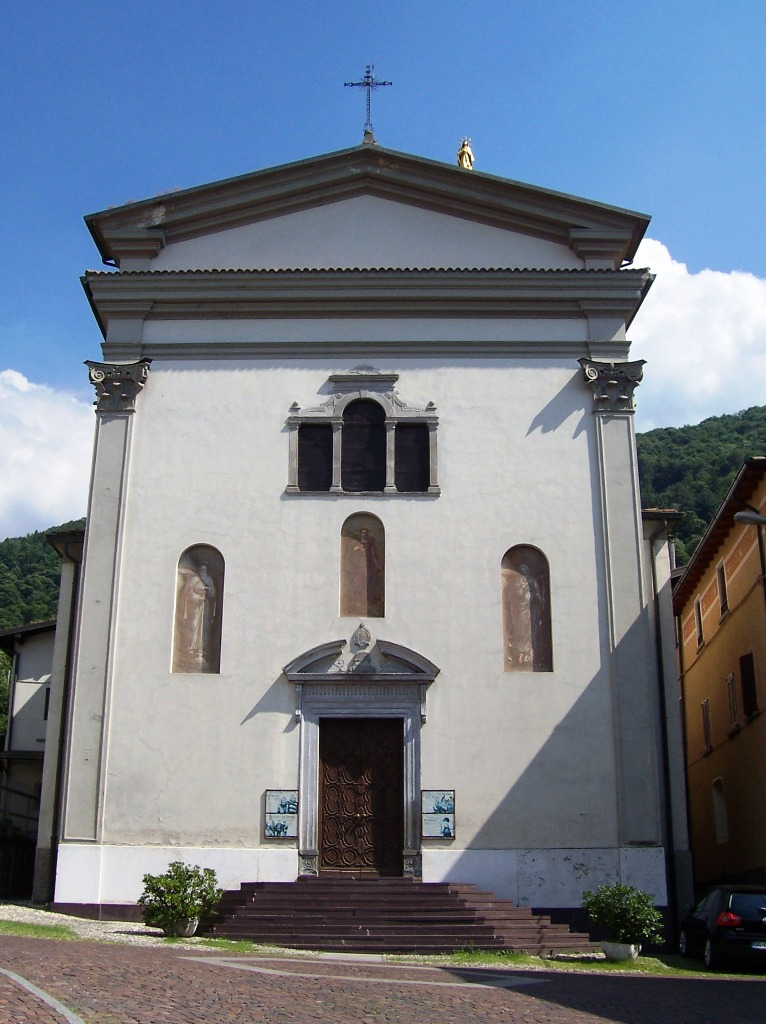
Parish church.
