= Nadia Fanchini =

Italian alpine skier

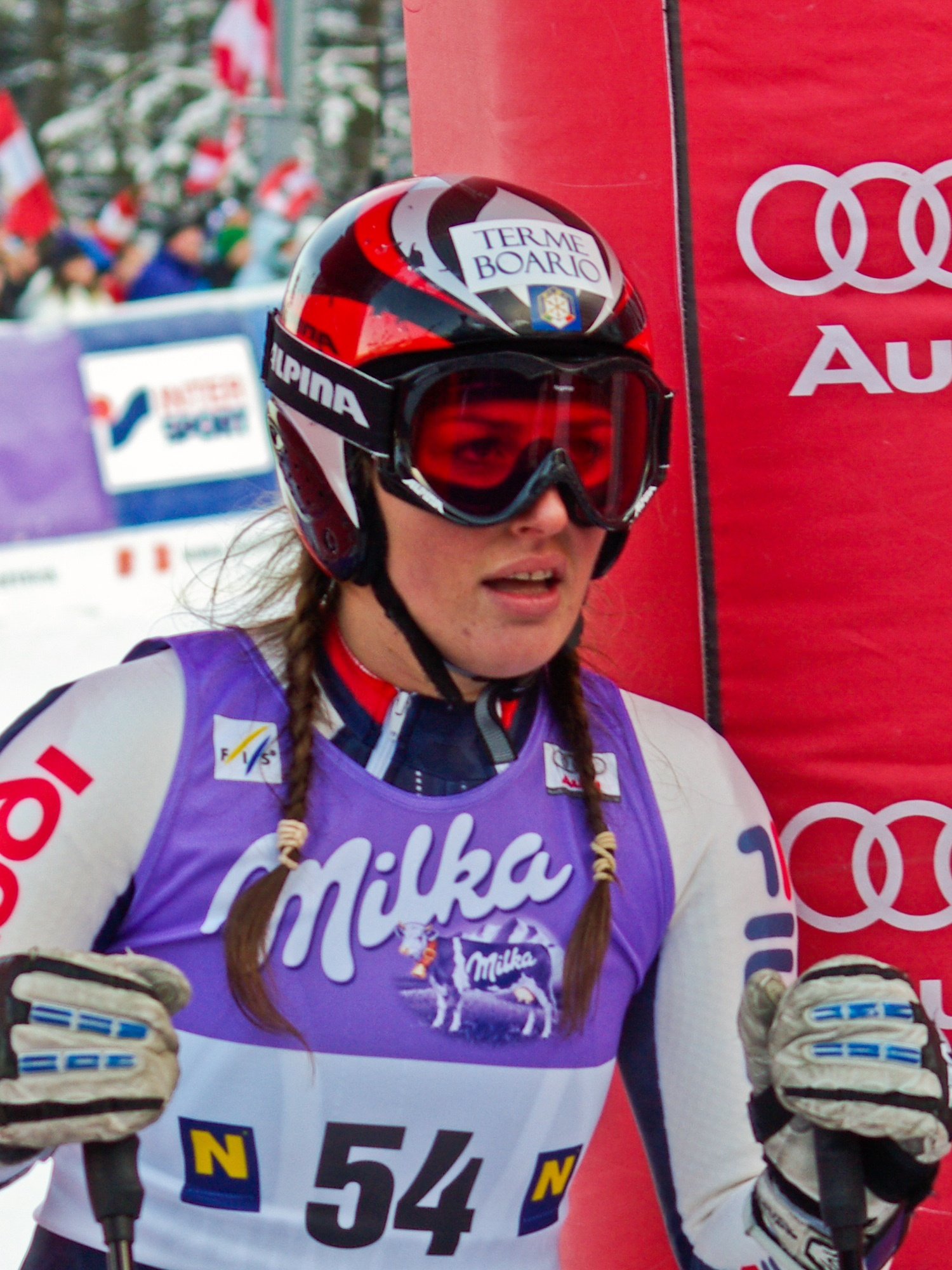
- Fanchini during competitions in Semmering, Austria in 2008

Personal information
- Born: 25 June 1986 (age 40) Lovere, Bergamo, Lombardy, Italy
- Height: 165 cm (5 ft 5 in)
- Website: sorellefanchini.it

Skiing career
- Sport: Alpine skiing
- Club: G.S. Fiamme Gialle
- Disciplines: Downhill, super-G, giant slalom
- World Cup debut: 13 December 2003 (age 17)

Olympics
- Teams: 3 – (2006, 2014, 2018)
- Medals: 0

World Championships
- Teams: 6 – (2005, 2007, 2009, 2013, 2015, 2019)
- Medals: 2 (0 gold)

World Cup
- Seasons: 15 – (2004–2010, 2012–2019)
- Wins: 2 – (1 SG, 1 DH)
- Podiums: 13 – (8 DH, 4 SG, 1 GS)
- Overall titles: 0 – (9th in 2009)
- Discipline titles: 0 – (2nd in SG, 2009)
Medal record
World Cup race podiums
Event	1st	2nd	3rd
Downhill	1	1	6
Super-G	1	1	2
Giant	0	1	0
Total	2	3	8
Women's alpine skiing
Representing Italy
World Championships
Silver medal – second place	2013 Schladming	Downhill
Bronze medal – third place	2009 Val d'Isère	Downhill
Junior World Championships
Gold medal – first place	2004 Maribor	Super-G
Gold medal – first place	2005 Bardonecchia	Downhill
Gold medal – first place	2005 Bardonecchia	Giant slalom
Silver medal – second place	2005 Bardonecchia	Super-G

Nadia Fanchini (born 25 June 1986) is a former World Cup alpine ski racer from Italy. Born in Lovere, she lives in Val Camonica. Her sisters Elena and Sabrina Fanchini were also members of the Italian World Cup team.

== Career ==
Fanchini represented Italy at the 2006 Winter Olympics and at four World Championships. She won a bronze medal in the downhill at the 2009 World Championships in Val d'Isère, France, and a silver medal in the downhill at the 2013 World Championships in Schladming, Austria.

In the final World Cup race before the 2010 Winter Olympics, Fanchini injured both knees in a Super-G. She missed the Olympics and the remainder of the 2010 season, as well as the 2011 season.

== World Cup results ==
=== Season standings ===
Season	Age	Overall	Slalom	Giant slalom	Super-G	Downhill	Combined
2004	17	112	—	—	51	—	—
2005	18	37	—	27	18	49	—
2006	19	22	—	18	37	15	—
2007	20	33	—	50	15	23	—
2008	21	38	—	—	35	13	—
2009	22	9	—	40	2	5	50
2010	23	28	—	—	13	23	—
2011	24	Injured, did not compete					
2012	25	75	—	28	—	—	—
2013	26	37	—	17	28	30	—
2014	27	18	—	11	9	34	—
2015	28	12	—	6	9	25	—
2016	29	14	—	16	13	6	—
2017	30	37	—	30	21	25	—
2018	31	27	—	—	17	16	—
2019	32	36	—	—	25	11	—

Standings through 4 February 2019

=== Race podiums ===
- 2 wins – (1 SG, 1 DH)
- 13 podiums – (8 DH, 4 SG, 1 GS)

Season	Date	Location	Discipline	Place
2007	1 Dec 2006	Lake Louise, Canada	Downhill	3rd
2008	9 Feb 2008	Sestriere, Italy	Downhill	3rd
2008	8 Mar 2008	Crans Montana, Switzerland	Downhill	3rd
2009	5 Dec 2008	Lake Louise, Canada	Downhill	2nd
2009	7 Dec 2008	Lake Louise, Canada	Super-G	1st
2009	20 Dec 2008	St. Moritz, Switzerland	Super-G	3rd
2009	27 Feb 2009	Bansko, Bulgaria	Downhill	3rd
2009	10 Mar 2009	Åre, Sweden	Super-G	2nd
2010	10 Jan 2010	Haus im Ennstal, Austria	Super-G	3rd
2015	13 Mar 2015	Åre, Sweden	Giant slalom	2nd
2016	19 Feb 2016	La Thuile, Italy	Downhill	3rd
2016	20 Feb 2016	La Thuile, Italy	Downhill	1st
2018	14 Jan 2018	Bad Kleinkirchheim, Austria	Downhill	3rd

== World Championship results ==
Year	Age	Slalom	Giant slalom	Super-G	Downhill	Combined
2005	18	—	DNF1	4	—	—
2007	20	—	—	DNF1	13	DSQ
2009	22	—	—	9	3	—
2011	24	Injured: did not compete				
2013	26	—	DNF1	21	2	—
2015	28	—	16	12	12	—
2017	30	Injured: did not compete				
2019	32	—	—	5	14	—

== Olympic results ==
Year	Age	Slalom	Giant slalom	Super-G	Downhill	Combined
2006	19	—	8	38	10	20
2010	23	injured the week prior, did not compete				
2014	27	—	4	10	22	—
2018	31	—	—	12	DNF	—

== National titles ==
Nadia Fanchini has won 13 national titles.

- Italian Alpine Ski Championships
  - Downhill: 2004, 2006, 2008, 2019 (4)
  - Super-G: 2004, 2006, 2008, 2014, 2015, 2016, 2019 (7)
  - Giant slalom: 2015 (1)
  - Combined: 20004 (1)
