= Franchini =

Franchini is an Italian surname. Notable people with the surname include:

- Gene E. Franchini (1935–2009), American lawyer and judge
- Gianfranco Franchini (1938–2009), Italian architect
- Irene Franchini (born 1981), Italian archer
- Luca Franchini (born 1983), Italian footballer
- Niccolò Franchini (1704–1783), Italian painter
- Teresa Franchini (1877–1972), Italian actress
