= Globe de mariée =

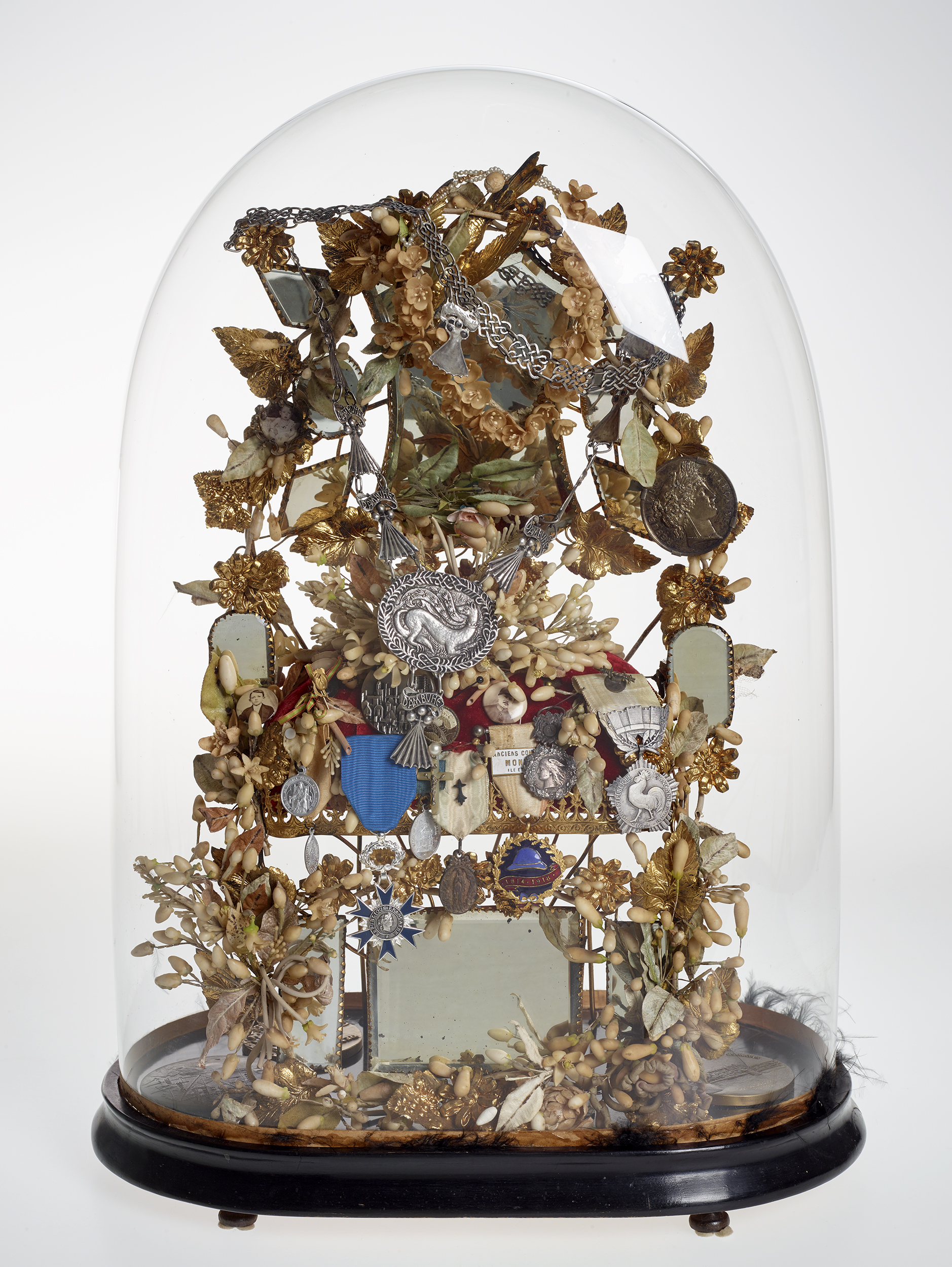
Globe de mariée

A Globe de mariée (literally "bridal globe" also called a globe de mariage (wedding globe) or verrine (glass globe)) is a decorative object designed to hold the bouquet or the wax orange blossom crown worn by the bride on her wedding day. The object was common in France from the mid 19th century to the early 20th century.

== History ==
The first globes appeared around 1850. This practice reached its peak in France between the 1890s and 1920s. The upheavals caused by the First World War, which altered the place of women in society and traditional practices, gradually led to the decline of the bridal globe.

Manufacturers were located mainly in Paris, but couples from many regions of France and even other European countries owned them in their homes.

A bridal globe consists of an oval glass bell jar, a base (usually wooden), and a velvet cushion, often red. It is always highly personalized with decorative elements made of wax, paper, glass (mirrors), and gilded metal (especially brass), which have a very strong symbolic significance.

The term "globe de mariée" is the most common. Globes of this name were designed as witnesses to the bride's purity and virtue. Objects considered intimately feminine were added to the bridal bouquet or crown: a communion purse, a scapular of the infant Mary, a chastity ring, etc.They are therefore indicative of the expectations and norms assigned to women during this period.

The broader term "globe de mariage" is more appropriate when the globe becomes a small personal family museum. A living object, it will over the years house memories of rites of passage and significant events such as family photographs, memories of the birth or death of a child, and military rewards.

== Bibliography ==
- Madeleine Bertrand (2015), "Globes de mariée en Haut-Languedoc", Société culturelle du Pays castrais, vol. cahier n° 40, Castres, ISBN 978-2-904401-70-1
- Laurentin, Marie-Thé (2007). Le chemin des noces (in French). Paris: Éditions de l'Archipel. pp. 30, 31, 32. ISBN 9782841879229.
- Parc naturel régional de Brière (2006). parure d'amour, histoire et vie d'un globe de mariée (in French). Nantes: Parc naturel régional de Brière. ISBN 2-9518546-3-3.
- Écomusée de la Bintinais (2024). Fleurs, Au-delà des apparences (livret d'exposition). Rennes: écomusée de la Bintinais. p. 31. ISBN 978-2-916486-19-2.
