= Lovere =

- Comune
- Comune di Lovere
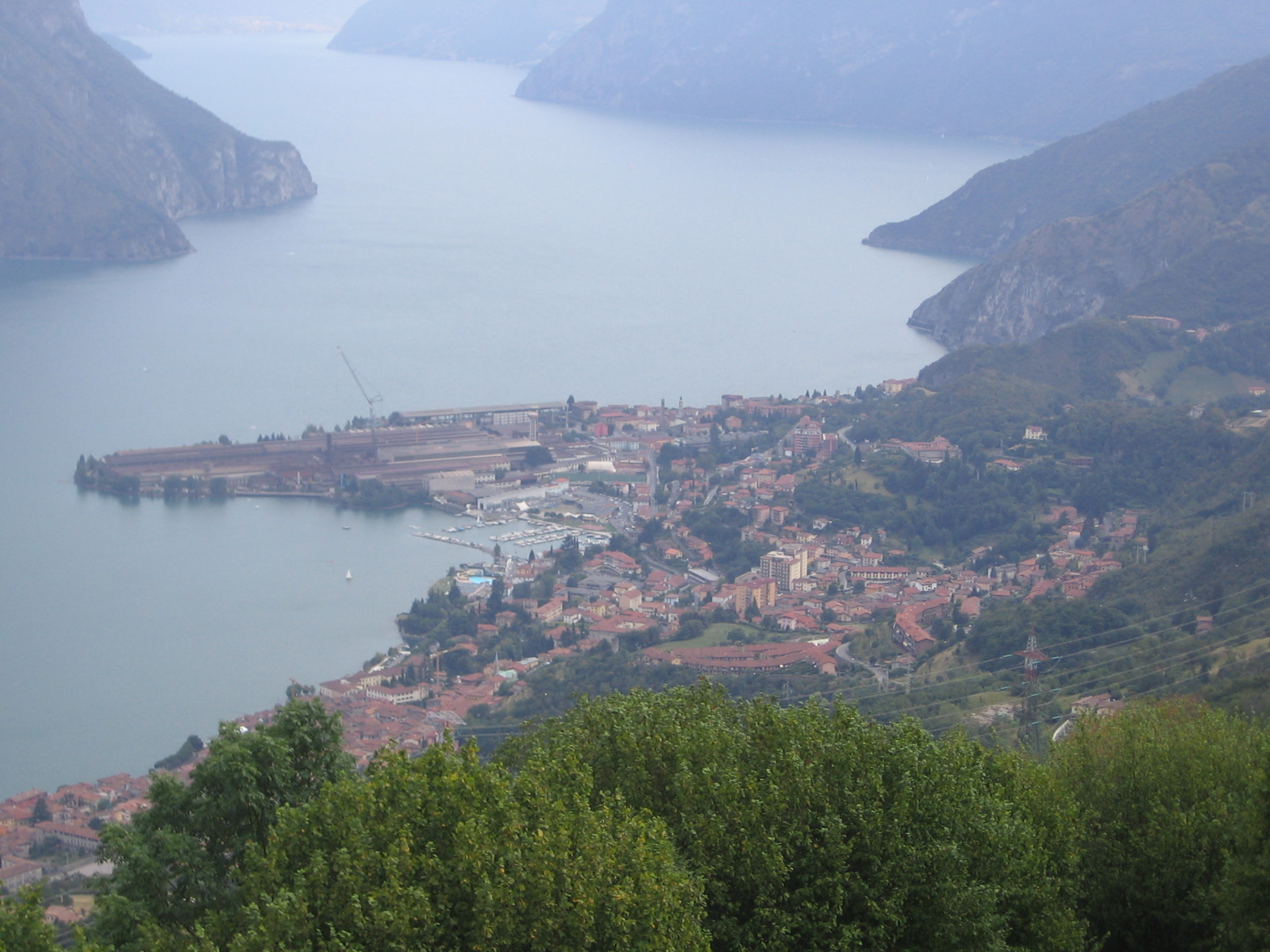

- Coat of arms

- Location within Italy Location within Lombardy
- Coordinates: 45°48′45″N 10°04′12″E
- Country: Italy
- Region: Lombardy
- Province: Bergamo (BG)

Government
  - Mayor: Alex Pennacchio

Area
  - Total: 7.36 km^{2} (2.84 sq mi)

Population (31 May 2021)
  - Total: 5,015
  - Density: 681/km^{2} (1,760/sq mi)
- Demonym: Loveresi
- Time zone: UTC+1 (CET)
  - Summer (DST): UTC+2 (CEST)
- Postal code: 24065
- Dialing code: 035
- Patron saint: Sts. Bartolomea Capitanio and Vincenza Gerosa
- Saint day: May 18
- Website: Official website

Lovere (Bergamasque: Lóer) is a town and comune in the province of Bergamo, in Lombardy, northern Italy, at the northwest end of Lake Iseo.

The houses in the city have overhanging wooden roofs, typical of Switzerland, combined with the heavy stone arcades of Italy. It lies on a lake and is flanked by a semicircle of mountains. It is one of I Borghi più belli d'Italia ("The most beautiful villages of Italy"). In 2018, Lovere was the only Lombardy town to finish in the top 20 of Italy's most beautiful towns.

== History ==
The first known settlement in the Lovere area dates to the 5th and 4th century BC, being of Celtic origin. Later it was conquered by the Romans, attracted by its strategic position location between the Val Camonica and the Val Cavallina, as well as for its transport potential on the Lake Iseo.

After the fall of the Western Roman Empire it was ruled by the Lombards and the Franks. Given to the monks of the Marmoutier Abbey, it was sold to the Bishops of Bergamo, who, at the time of the Guelphs and Ghibellines struggle, were in turn replaced by the Celeri family. The fights lasted until the mid-15th century, when the territory was conquered by the Republic of Venice, whose rule lasted until the French invasion in 1797.

The English aristocrat and writer Lady Mary Wortley Montagu spent ten years of her life on the shores of Lake Iseo.

== Main sights ==
- Santa Maria in Valvendra, a parish church built initially in Gothic style before 1473, then replaced by Renaissance forms. It has with a nave and two aisles, and houses works by Gian Paolo Cavagna, Domenico Carpinoni and Piero Marone.
- Palazzo Tadini, a palace and art gallery including paintings by Barbelli, Il Cerano, Pietro Damini, Jacopo Ligozzi, CF Nuvolone, Santo Prunati, Pietro Ricchi, Elisabetta Sirani, Paris Bordone, Ceruti, Cifrondi, Luigi Frisoni, Fra' Galgario, GD Tiepolo, Francesco Zugno and others. Paintings from the 19th century include works by Eduardo Arroyo, Bengt Lindstrom, Emilio Vedova and others. The palace is also home to marble sculptures by Benzoni, Johann Weigel, Andrea Chierici, Luciano Zambetti and Canova. The museum also contains a collection of terracotta, porcelain, antique armor and armaments, and furniture. Palazzo Tadini houses also a zoological collection.
- San Giorgio church, dating from 1263, although mostly rebuilt in the mid-15th century. It houses a Last Supper by Cavagana and Trinity with the Virgin by Palma the Younger.
- Santa Chiara, a Clarissan monastery built in the early 16th century. It has some works by Sebastiano Conca.
- San Martino oratory, dated by some to the 9th century, and including some recently rediscovered frescoes in the apse.
- Castelliere, an ancient fortification, some portions of which date from the 3rd century BC.
- Sanctuary of Lovere's Saints, church built between 1931 and 1938, to house the remains of Saints Bartolomea Capitanio and Vincenza Gerosa, and featuring work by Luigi Morgari amongst others.
  Sanctuary of Lovere's Saints - view from via Oprandi
  Sanctuary of Lovere's Saints - view from Via Santa Gerosa

== Economy ==
Lovere possesses a metallurgic plant, Lucchini RS, which employs about 1300 people and specializes in the manufacture of railroad wheels and axles.

=== Transportation ===
The former Lovere–Cividate Camuno Tramway no longer exists. There is no train station in Lovere. The closest train station is in Pisogne. There is, however, bus and ferry service to Lovere.

The Strada statale 42 del Tonale e della Mendola (State Highway 42) bypasses Lovere, but does go nearby.

== People ==
1906 Medicine Nobel Prize Camillo Golgi studied in Lovere's Liceo Classico. Giacomo Agostini, all-time leader in victories in motorcycle Grand Prix history, was born in Lovere in 1942. Leading cinema critic and RAI author Enrico Ghezzi was born in Lovere in 1952.

The alpine skiers Elena, Nadia and Sabrina Fanchini also come from Lovere.

The 'Lovere Saints' Vincenza Gerosa and Bartolomea Capitanio were born, worked and died in Lovere.
