= Sabrina Fanchini =

Italian alpine skier (born 1988)

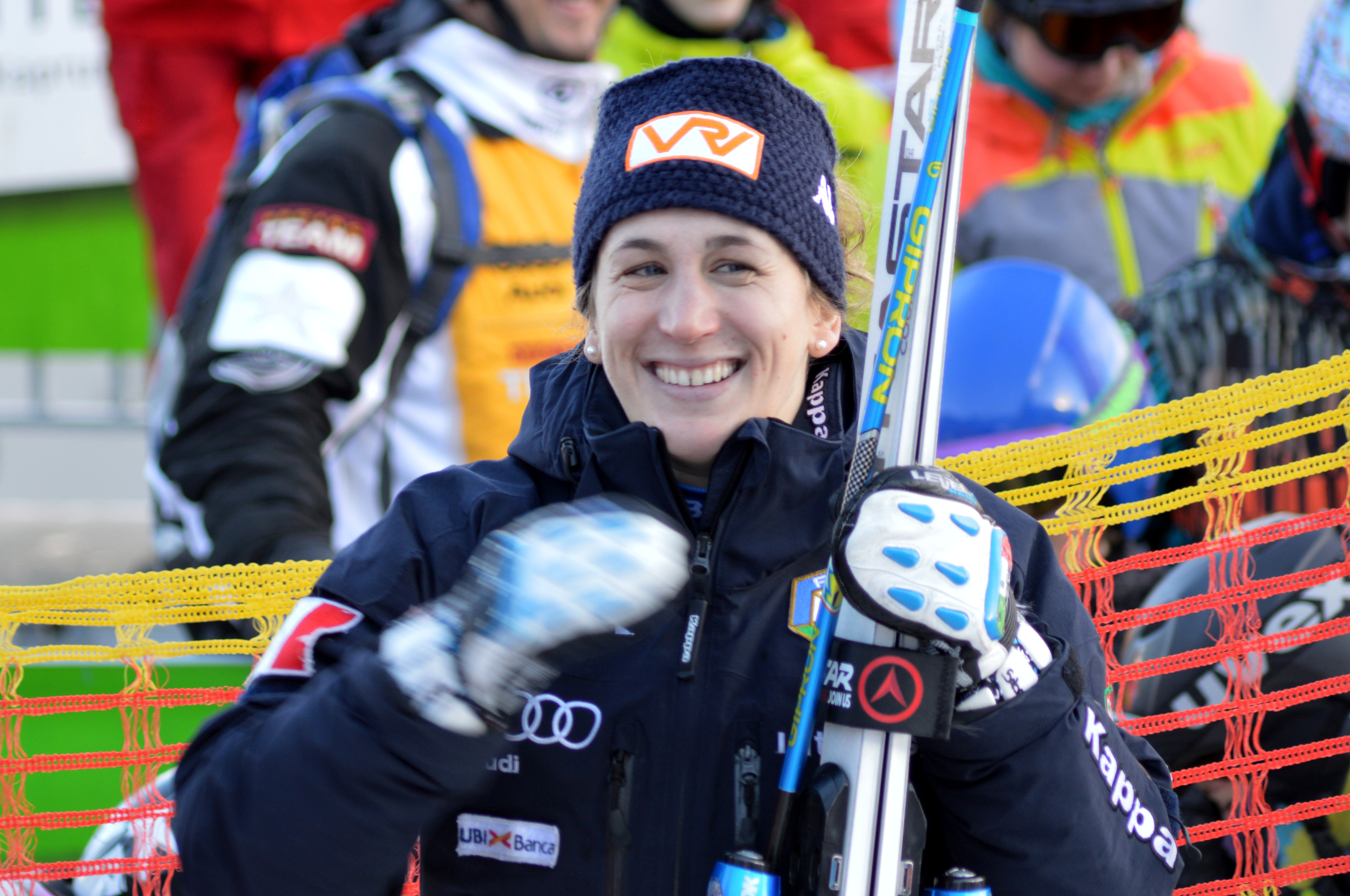

Personal information
- Born: 17 August 1988 (age 37) Sterzing, Italy
- Height: 1.55 m (5 ft 1 in)

Skiing career
- Sport: Alpine skiing
- Club: C.S. Esercito
- Retired: 2016
- Disciplines: Technical events
- World Cup debut: 2004

World Cup
- Seasons: 13

Sabrina Fanchini (born 17 August 1988) is a retired Italian alpine skier.

She is a sister of Elena and Nadia Fanchini.

== Career ==
She made her FIS Alpine Ski World Cup debut in December 2010 in Courchevel, also collecting her first World Cup points with a 28th place. She followed up with two 26th places before improving to an 8th place in the December 2011 Lienz giant slalom. Her last World Cup points came in the same race two years later, where she finished 16th, but she then proceeded to compete in the 2014–15 and 2015–16 World Cup circuits without finishing any races.

She represented the military sports club CS Esercito.
