= List of 2018 Winter Olympics medal winners =

The 2018 Winter Olympics was held in Pyeongchang County, South Korea, between 9–25 February 2018. The games featured 102 events in 15 sports, making it the first Winter Olympics to surpass 100 medal events. Four new disciplines in existing sports were introduced to the Winter Olympic programme in Pyeongchang, including big air snowboarding, mixed doubles curling, mass start speed skating, and mixed team alpine skiing.

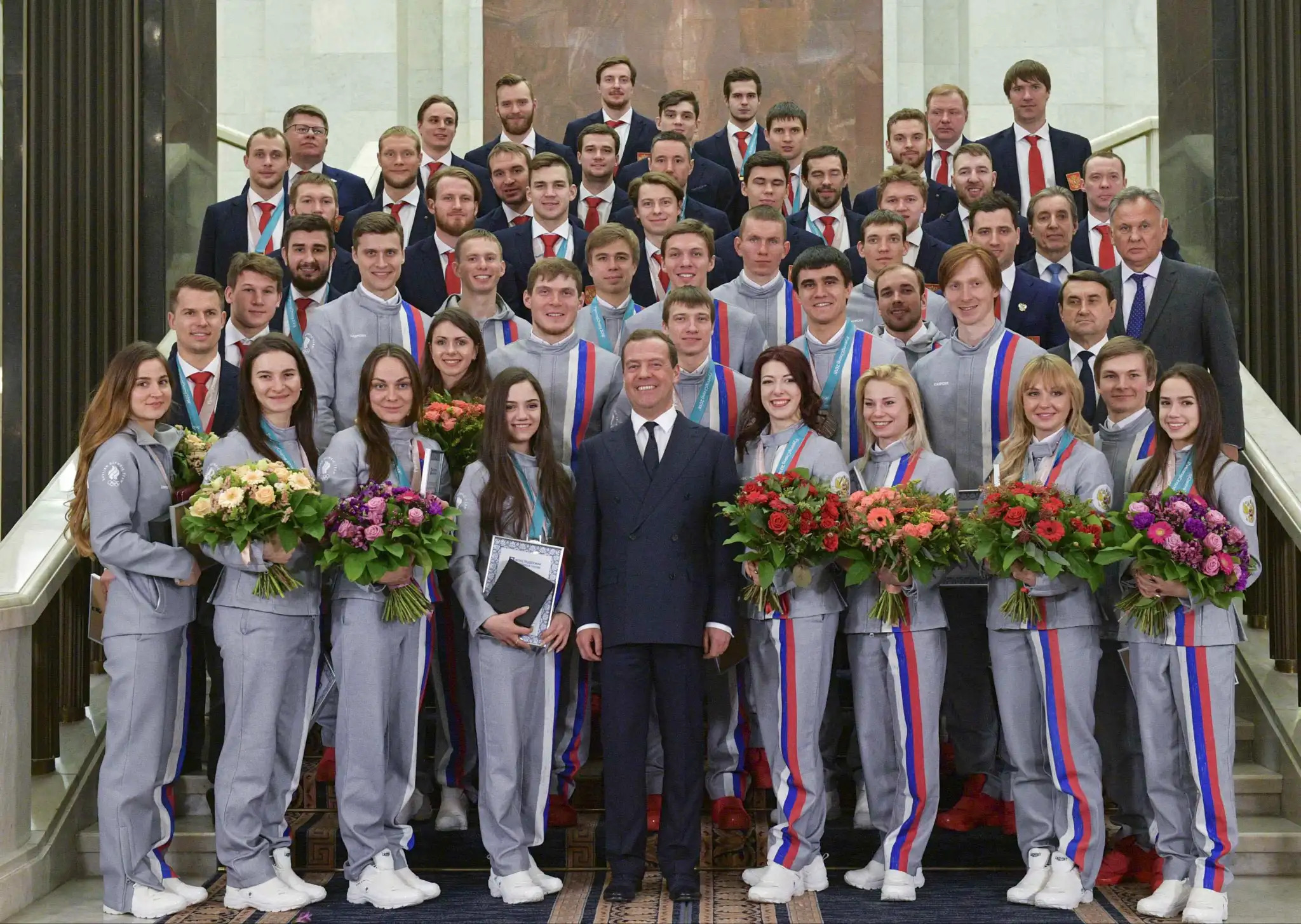
Russian Prime Minister Dmitry Medvedev with medal winners from Russia, 28 February 2018

The Netherlands achieved a podium sweep in speed skating, in the women's 3,000 metres. Norway achieved a podium sweep in cross-country skiing, in the men's 30 km skiathlon. Germany achieved a podium sweep in Nordic combined, in the individual large hill/10 km.

Norwegian cross-country skier Marit Bjørgen won five medals (two gold, one silver, and two bronze), the most of any athlete at the 2018 games. With 15 total Olympic medals, she also became the most decorated athlete in Winter Olympics history. Swedish cross-country skier Charlotte Kalla finished with four medals (one gold, three silver), as did her compatriot and fellow cross-country skier Stina Nilsson (one gold, two silvers, one bronze) and Russian cross-country skier Alexander Bolshunov (three silver, one bronze) who was competing for the Olympic Athletes from Russia. Norwegian cross-country skier Johannes Høsflot Klæbo and French biathlete Martin Fourcade tied for the most gold medals, with three each. Ester Ledecká of the Czech Republic became the first female Winter Olympian to achieve a gold medal in two separate sports at a single Games, winning in both alpine skiing and snowboarding.

== Alpine skiing ==
=== Men's events ===
| Event | Gold | Silver | Bronze |
|---|---|---|---|
| Downhill | Aksel Lund Svindal; Norway | Kjetil Jansrud; Norway | Beat Feuz; Switzerland |
| Super-G | Matthias Mayer; Austria | Beat Feuz; Switzerland | Kjetil Jansrud; Norway |
| Giant slalom | Marcel Hirscher; Austria | Henrik Kristoffersen; Norway | Alexis Pinturault; France |
| Slalom | André Myhrer; Sweden | Ramon Zenhäusern; Switzerland | Michael Matt; Austria |
| Combined | Marcel Hirscher; Austria | Alexis Pinturault; France | Victor Muffat-Jeandet; France |

=== Women's events ===
| Event | Gold | Silver | Bronze |
|---|---|---|---|
| Downhill | Sofia Goggia; Italy | Ragnhild Mowinckel; Norway | Lindsey Vonn; United States |
| Super-G | Ester Ledecká; Czech Republic | Anna Veith; Austria | Tina Weirather; Liechtenstein |
| Giant slalom | Mikaela Shiffrin; United States | Ragnhild Mowinckel; Norway | Federica Brignone; Italy |
| Slalom | Frida Hansdotter; Sweden | Wendy Holdener; Switzerland | Katharina Gallhuber; Austria |
| Combined | Michelle Gisin; Switzerland | Mikaela Shiffrin; United States | Wendy Holdener; Switzerland |

=== Mixed events ===
| Event | Gold | Silver | Bronze |
|---|---|---|---|
| Mixed team | Switzerland; Denise Feierabend; Wendy Holdener; Luca Aerni; Daniel Yule; Ramon Zenhäusern | Austria; Stephanie Brunner; Katharina Gallhuber; Katharina Liensberger; Manuel Feller; Michael Matt; Marco Schwarz | Norway; Nina Haver-Løseth; Kristin Lysdahl; Maren Skjøld; Sebastian Foss-Solevåg; Leif Kristian Nestvold-Haugen; Jonathan Nordbotten |

== Biathlon ==
=== Men's events ===
| Event | Gold | Silver | Bronze |
|---|---|---|---|
| Individual | Johannes Thingnes Bø; Norway | Jakov Fak; Slovenia | Dominik Landertinger; Austria |
| Sprint | Arnd Peiffer; Germany | Michal Krčmář; Czech Republic | Dominik Windisch; Italy |
| Pursuit | Martin Fourcade; France | Sebastian Samuelsson; Sweden | Benedikt Doll; Germany |
| Mass start | Martin Fourcade; France | Simon Schempp; Germany | Emil Hegle Svendsen; Norway |
| Relay | Sweden; Peppe Femling; Jesper Nelin; Sebastian Samuelsson; Fredrik Lindström | Norway; Lars Helge Birkeland; Tarjei Bø; Johannes Thingnes Bø; Emil Hegle Svendsen | Germany; Erik Lesser; Benedikt Doll; Arnd Peiffer; Simon Schempp |

=== Women's events ===
| Event | Gold | Silver | Bronze |
|---|---|---|---|
| Individual | Hanna Öberg; Sweden | Anastasiya Kuzmina; Slovakia | Laura Dahlmeier; Germany |
| Sprint | Laura Dahlmeier; Germany | Marte Olsbu; Norway | Veronika Vítková; Czech Republic |
| Pursuit | Laura Dahlmeier; Germany | Anastasiya Kuzmina; Slovakia | Anaïs Bescond; France |
| Mass start | Anastasiya Kuzmina; Slovakia | Darya Domracheva; Belarus | Tiril Eckhoff; Norway |
| Relay | Belarus; Nadezhda Skardino; Iryna Kryuko; Dzinara Alimbekava; Darya Domracheva | Sweden; Linn Persson; Mona Brorsson; Anna Magnusson; Hanna Öberg | France; Anaïs Chevalier; Marie Dorin Habert; Justine Braisaz; Anaïs Bescond |

=== Mixed events ===
| Event | Gold | Silver | Bronze |
|---|---|---|---|
| Mixed relay | France; Marie Dorin Habert; Anaïs Bescond; Simon Desthieux; Martin Fourcade | Norway; Marte Olsbu; Tiril Eckhoff; Johannes Thingnes Bø; Emil Hegle Svendsen | Italy; Lisa Vittozzi; Dorothea Wierer; Lukas Hofer; Dominik Windisch |

== Bobsleigh ==
| Event | Gold | Silver | Bronze |
|---|---|---|---|
| Two-man | Canada; Justin Kripps; Alexander Kopacz | Not awarded | Latvia; Oskars Melbārdis; Jānis Strenga |
| Two-man | Germany; Francesco Friedrich; Thorsten Margis | Not awarded | Latvia; Oskars Melbārdis; Jānis Strenga |
| Four-man | Germany; Francesco Friedrich; Candy Bauer; Martin Grothkopp; Thorsten Margis | South Korea; Won Yun-jong; Jun Jung-lin; Seo Young-woo; Kim Dong-hyun | Not awarded |
| Four-man | Germany; Francesco Friedrich; Candy Bauer; Martin Grothkopp; Thorsten Margis | Germany; Nico Walther; Kevin Kuske; Alexander Rödiger; Eric Franke | Not awarded |
| Two-woman | Germany; Mariama Jamanka; Lisa Buckwitz | United States; Elana Meyers Taylor; Lauren Gibbs | Canada; Kaillie Humphries; Phylicia George |

== Cross-country skiing ==
=== Men's events ===
| Games | Gold | Silver | Bronze |
|---|---|---|---|
| 15 kilometre freestyle | Dario Cologna; Switzerland | Simen Hegstad Krüger; Norway | Denis Spitsov; Olympic Athletes from Russia |
| 30 kilometre skiathlon | Simen Hegstad Krüger; Norway | Martin Johnsrud Sundby; Norway | Hans Christer Holund; Norway |
| 50 kilometre classical | Iivo Niskanen; Finland | Aleksandr Bolshunov; Olympic Athletes from Russia | Andrey Larkov; Olympic Athletes from Russia |
| 4 × 10 kilometre relay | Norway; Didrik Tønseth; Martin Johnsrud Sundby; Simen Hegstad Krüger; Johannes Høsflot Klæbo | Olympic Athletes from Russia; Andrey Larkov; Aleksandr Bolshunov; Aleksey Chervotkin; Denis Spitsov | France; Jean-Marc Gaillard; Maurice Manificat; Clément Parisse; Adrien Backscheider |
| Sprint classical | Johannes Høsflot Klæbo; Norway | Federico Pellegrino; Italy | Aleksandr Bolshunov; Olympic Athletes from Russia |
| Team sprint freestyle | Norway; Martin Johnsrud Sundby; Johannes Høsflot Klæbo | Olympic Athletes from Russia; Denis Spitsov; Aleksandr Bolshunov | France; Maurice Manificat; Richard Jouve |

=== Women's events ===
| Games | Gold | Silver | Bronze |
|---|---|---|---|
| 10 kilometre freestyle | Ragnhild Haga; Norway | Charlotte Kalla; Sweden | Marit Bjørgen; Norway Krista Pärmäkoski; Finland |
| 15 kilometre skiathlon | Charlotte Kalla; Sweden | Marit Bjørgen; Norway | Krista Pärmäkoski; Finland |
| 30 kilometre classical | Marit Bjørgen; Norway | Krista Pärmäkoski; Finland | Stina Nilsson; Sweden |
| 4 × 5 kilometre relay | Norway; Ingvild Flugstad Østberg; Astrid Uhrenholdt Jacobsen; Ragnhild Haga; Marit Bjørgen | Sweden; Anna Haag; Charlotte Kalla; Ebba Andersson; Stina Nilsson | Olympic Athletes from Russia; Natalia Nepryaeva; Yulia Belorukova; Anastasia Sedova; Anna Nechaevskaya |
| Sprint classical | Stina Nilsson; Sweden | Maiken Caspersen Falla; Norway | Yulia Belorukova; Olympic Athletes from Russia |
| Team sprint freestyle | United States; Kikkan Randall; Jessie Diggins | Sweden; Charlotte Kalla; Stina Nilsson | Norway; Marit Bjørgen; Maiken Caspersen Falla |

== Curling ==
| Event | Gold | Silver | Bronze |
|---|---|---|---|
| Men | United States; John Shuster; Tyler George; Matt Hamilton; John Landsteiner; Joe Polo | Sweden; Niklas Edin; Oskar Eriksson; Rasmus Wranå; Christoffer Sundgren; Henrik Leek | Switzerland; Benoît Schwarz; Claudio Pätz; Peter de Cruz; Valentin Tanner; Dominik Märki |
| Women | Sweden; Anna Hasselborg; Sara McManus; Agnes Knochenhauer; Sofia Mabergs; Jennie Wåhlin | South Korea; Kim Eun-jung; Kim Kyeong-ae; Kim Seon-yeong; Kim Yeong-mi; Kim Cho-hi | Japan; Satsuki Fujisawa; Chinami Yoshida; Yumi Suzuki; Yurika Yoshida; Mari Motohashi |
| Mixed doubles | Canada; Kaitlyn Lawes; John Morris | Switzerland; Jenny Perret; Martin Rios | Norway; Kristin Skaslien; Magnus Nedregotten |

== Figure skating ==
| Discipline | Gold | Silver | Bronze |
|---|---|---|---|
| Men's singles | Yuzuru Hanyu; Japan | Shoma Uno; Japan | Javier Fernández; Spain |
| Ladies' singles | Alina Zagitova; Olympic Athletes from Russia | Evgenia Medvedeva; Olympic Athletes from Russia | Kaetlyn Osmond; Canada |
| Pairs skating | Germany; Aliona Savchenko; Bruno Massot | China; Sui Wenjing; Han Cong | Canada; Meagan Duhamel; Eric Radford |
| Ice dancing | Canada; Tessa Virtue; Scott Moir | France; Gabriella Papadakis; Guillaume Cizeron | United States; Maia Shibutani; Alex Shibutani |
| Team event | Canada; Patrick Chan; Kaetlyn Osmond; Gabrielle Daleman; Meagan Duhamel; Eric Radford; Tessa Virtue; Scott Moir | Olympic Athletes from Russia; Mikhail Kolyada; Evgenia Medvedeva; Alina Zagitova; Evgenia Tarasova; Vladimir Morozov; Natalya Zabiyako; Alexander Enbert; Ekaterina Bobrova; Dmitri Soloviev | United States; Nathan Chen; Adam Rippon; Bradie Tennell; Mirai Nagasu; Alexa Scimeca Knierim; Chris Knierim; Maia Shibutani; Alex Shibutani |

== Freestyle skiing ==
=== Men's events ===
| Games | Gold | Silver | Bronze |
|---|---|---|---|
| Aerials | Oleksandr Abramenko; Ukraine | Jia Zongyang; China | Ilya Burov; Olympic Athletes from Russia |
| Halfpipe | David Wise; United States | Alex Ferreira; United States | Nico Porteous; New Zealand |
| Moguls | Mikaël Kingsbury; Canada | Matt Graham; Australia | Daichi Hara; Japan |
| Ski cross | Brady Leman; Canada | Marc Bischofberger; Switzerland | Sergey Ridzik; Olympic Athletes from Russia |
| Slopestyle | Øystein Bråten; Norway | Nick Goepper; United States | Alex Beaulieu-Marchand; Canada |

=== Women's events ===
| Games | Gold | Silver | Bronze |
|---|---|---|---|
| Aerials | Hanna Huskova; Belarus | Zhang Xin; China | Kong Fanyu; China |
| Halfpipe | Cassie Sharpe; Canada | Marie Martinod; France | Brita Sigourney; United States |
| Moguls | Perrine Laffont; France | Justine Dufour-Lapointe; Canada | Yuliya Galysheva; Kazakhstan |
| Ski cross | Kelsey Serwa; Canada | Brittany Phelan; Canada | Fanny Smith; Switzerland |
| Slopestyle | Sarah Höfflin; Switzerland | Mathilde Gremaud; Switzerland | Isabel Atkin; Great Britain |

== Ice hockey ==
| Games | Gold | Silver | Bronze |
|---|---|---|---|
| Men's tournament | Olympic Athletes from Russia; Vasily Koshechkin; Igor Shestyorkin; Ilya Sorokin; Vladislav Gavrikov; Dinar Khafizullin; Bogdan Kiselevich; Alexey Marchenko; Nikita Nesterov; Vyacheslav Voynov; Artyom Zub; Andrei Zubarev; Sergei Andronov; Alexander Barabanov; Pavel Datsyuk; Mikhail Grigorenko; Nikita Gusev; Ilya Kablukov; Sergey Kalinin; Kirill Kaprizov; Ilya Kovalchuk; Sergei Mozyakin; Nikolai Prokhorkin; Vadim Shipachyov; Sergei Shirokov; Ivan Telegin | Germany; Denis Reul; Justin Krueger; Tobias Rieder; Christian Ehrhoff; Brooks Macek; Konrad Abeltshauser; Marcus Kink; Matthias Plachta; Dennis Seidenberg; Leon Draisaitl; Philipp Grubauer; Danny aus den Birken; Yannic Seidenberg; Patrick Reimer; Yasin Ehliz; Gerrit Fauser; Frank Hördler; Patrick Hager; Felix Schütz; Dominik Kahun; Philip Gogulla; David Wolf; Moritz Müller; Frederik Tiffels | Canada; Karl Stollery; Chris Lee; Chay Genoway; Gilbert Brulé; Wojtek Wolski; Derek Roy; Chris Kelly; Rob Klinkhammer; Brandon Kozun; Quinton Howden; Rene Bourque; Marc-André Gragnani; Andrew Ebbett; Mason Raymond; Eric O'Dell; Stefan Elliott; Cody Goloubef; Ben Scrivens; Kevin Poulin; Justin Peters; Mat Robinson; Maxim Lapierre; Maxim Noreau; Linden Vey; Christian Thomas |
| Women's tournament | United States; Kacey Bellamy; Hannah Brandt; Dani Cameranesi; Kendall Coyne; Brianna Decker; Meghan Duggan; Kali Flanagan; Nicole Hensley; Amanda Kessel; Megan Keller; Hilary Knight; Jocelyne Lamoureux; Monique Lamoureux; Gigi Marvin; Sidney Morin; Kelly Pannek; Amanda Pelkey; Emily Pfalzer; Alex Rigsby; Maddie Rooney; Haley Skarupa; Lee Stecklein | Canada; Meghan Agosta; Bailey Bram; Emily Clark; Mélodie Daoust; Ann-Renée Desbiens; Renata Fast; Laura Fortino; Haley Irwin; Brianne Jenner; Rebecca Johnston; Geneviève Lacasse; Brigette Lacquette; Jocelyne Larocque; Meaghan Mikkelson; Sarah Nurse; Marie-Philip Poulin; Lauriane Rougeau; Jillian Saulnier; Natalie Spooner; Laura Stacey; Shannon Szabados; Blayre Turnbull; Jenn Wakefield | Finland; Sanni Hakala; Jenni Hiirikoski; Venla Hovi; Mira Jalosuo; Michelle Karvinen; Rosa Lindstedt; Petra Nieminen; Tanja Niskanen; Emma Nuutinen; Isa Rahunen; Meeri Räisänen; Annina Rajahuhta; Noora Räty; Saila Saari; Sara Säkkinen; Ronja Savolainen; Eveliina Suonpää; Susanna Tapani; Noora Tulus; Minnamari Tuominen; Riikka Välilä; Linda Välimäki; Ella Viitasuo |

== Luge ==
| Event | Gold | Silver | Bronze |
|---|---|---|---|
| Men's singles | David Gleirscher; Austria | Chris Mazdzer; United States | Johannes Ludwig; Germany |
| Women's singles | Natalie Geisenberger; Germany | Dajana Eitberger; Germany | Alex Gough; Canada |
| Doubles | Germany; Tobias Wendl; Tobias Arlt | Austria; Peter Penz; Georg Fischler | Germany; Toni Eggert; Sascha Benecken |
| Team relay | Germany; Natalie Geisenberger; Johannes Ludwig; Tobias Wendl; Tobias Arlt | Canada; Alex Gough; Sam Edney; Tristan Walker; Justin Snith | Austria; Madeleine Egle; David Gleirscher; Peter Penz; Georg Fischler |

== Nordic combined ==
| Games | Gold | Silver | Bronze |
|---|---|---|---|
| Individual large hill/10 km | Johannes Rydzek; Germany | Fabian Rießle; Germany | Eric Frenzel; Germany |
| Individual normal hill/10 km | Eric Frenzel; Germany | Akito Watabe; Japan | Lukas Klapfer; Austria |
| Team large hill/4 × 5 km | Germany; Vinzenz Geiger; Fabian Rießle; Eric Frenzel; Johannes Rydzek | Norway; Jan Schmid; Espen Andersen; Jarl Magnus Riiber; Jørgen Graabak | Austria; Wilhelm Denifl; Lukas Klapfer; Bernhard Gruber; Mario Seidl |

== Short track speed skating ==
=== Men's events ===
| Games | Gold | Silver | Bronze |
|---|---|---|---|
| 500 metres | Wu Dajing; China | Hwang Dae-heon; South Korea | Lim Hyo-jun; South Korea |
| 1000 metres | Samuel Girard; Canada | John-Henry Krueger; United States | Seo Yi-ra; South Korea |
| 1500 metres | Lim Hyo-jun; South Korea | Sjinkie Knegt; Netherlands | Semion Elistratov; Olympic Athletes from Russia |
| 5000 metre relay | Hungary; Shaoang Liu; Shaolin Sándor Liu; Viktor Knoch; Csaba Burján | China; Wu Dajing; Han Tianyu; Xu Hongzhi; Chen Dequan | Canada; Samuel Girard; Charles Hamelin; Charle Cournoyer; Pascal Dion |

=== Women's events ===
| Games | Gold | Silver | Bronze |
|---|---|---|---|
| 500 metres | Arianna Fontana; Italy | Yara van Kerkhof; Netherlands | Kim Boutin; Canada |
| 1000 metres | Suzanne Schulting; Netherlands | Kim Boutin; Canada | Arianna Fontana; Italy |
| 1500 metres | Choi Min-jeong; South Korea | Li Jinyu; China | Kim Boutin; Canada |
| 3000 metre relay | South Korea; Shim Suk-hee; Choi Min-jeong; Kim Ye-jin; Kim A-lang | Italy; Arianna Fontana; Lucia Peretti; Cecilia Maffei; Martina Valcepina | Netherlands; Suzanne Schulting; Yara van Kerkhof; Lara van Ruijven; Jorien ter Mors |

== Skeleton ==
| Games | Gold | Silver | Bronze |
|---|---|---|---|
| Men's | Yun Sung-bin; South Korea | Nikita Tregubov; Olympic Athletes from Russia | Dom Parsons; Great Britain |
| Women's | Lizzy Yarnold; Great Britain | Jacqueline Lölling; Germany | Laura Deas; Great Britain |

== Ski jumping ==
| Games | Gold | Silver | Bronze |
|---|---|---|---|
| Men's individual normal hill | Andreas Wellinger; Germany | Johann André Forfang; Norway | Robert Johansson; Norway |
| Men's individual large hill | Kamil Stoch; Poland | Andreas Wellinger; Germany | Robert Johansson; Norway |
| Men's team large hill | Norway; Daniel-André Tande; Andreas Stjernen; Johann André Forfang; Robert Johansson | Germany; Karl Geiger; Stephan Leyhe; Richard Freitag; Andreas Wellinger | Poland; Maciej Kot; Stefan Hula; Dawid Kubacki; Kamil Stoch |
| Women's individual normal hill | Maren Lundby; Norway | Katharina Althaus; Germany | Sara Takanashi; Japan |

== Snowboarding ==
=== Men's events ===
| Games | Gold | Silver | Bronze |
|---|---|---|---|
| Big Air | Sébastien Toutant; Canada | Kyle Mack; United States | Billy Morgan; Great Britain |
| Halfpipe | Shaun White; United States | Ayumu Hirano; Japan | Scotty James; Australia |
| Parallel giant slalom | Nevin Galmarini; Switzerland | Lee Sang-ho; South Korea | Žan Košir; Slovenia |
| Slopestyle | Redmond Gerard; United States | Max Parrot; Canada | Mark McMorris; Canada |
| Snowboard cross | Pierre Vaultier; France | Jarryd Hughes; Australia | Regino Hernández; Spain |

=== Women's events ===
| Games | Gold | Silver | Bronze |
|---|---|---|---|
| Big Air | Anna Gasser; Austria | Jamie Anderson; United States | Zoi Sadowski-Synnott; New Zealand |
| Halfpipe | Chloe Kim; United States | Liu Jiayu; China | Arielle Gold; United States |
| Parallel giant slalom | Ester Ledecká; Czech Republic | Selina Jörg; Germany | Ramona Theresia Hofmeister; Germany |
| Slopestyle | Jamie Anderson; United States | Laurie Blouin; Canada | Enni Rukajärvi; Finland |
| Snowboard cross | Michela Moioli; Italy | Julia Pereira de Sousa-Mabileau; France | Eva Samková; Czech Republic |

== Speed skating ==
=== Men's events ===
| Games | Gold | Silver | Bronze |
|---|---|---|---|
| 500 metres | Håvard Lorentzen; Norway | Cha Min-kyu; South Korea | Gao Tingyu; China |
| 1000 metres | Kjeld Nuis; Netherlands | Håvard Lorentzen; Norway | Kim Tae-yun; South Korea |
| 1500 metres | Kjeld Nuis; Netherlands | Patrick Roest; Netherlands | Kim Min-seok; South Korea |
| 5000 metres | Sven Kramer; Netherlands | Ted-Jan Bloemen; Canada | Sverre Lunde Pedersen; Norway |
| 10,000 metres | Ted-Jan Bloemen; Canada | Jorrit Bergsma; Netherlands | Nicola Tumolero; Italy |
| Mass start | Lee Seung-hoon; South Korea | Bart Swings; Belgium | Koen Verweij; Netherlands |
| Team pursuit | Norway; Håvard Bøkko; Simen Spieler Nilsen; Sverre Lunde Pedersen; Sindre Henriksen | South Korea; Lee Seung-hoon; Chung Jae-won; Kim Min-seok; Joo Hyong-jun | Netherlands; Patrick Roest; Sven Kramer; Jan Blokhuijsen; Koen Verweij |

=== Women's events ===
| Games | Gold | Silver | Bronze |
|---|---|---|---|
| 500 metres | Nao Kodaira; Japan | Lee Sang-hwa; South Korea | Karolína Erbanová; Czech Republic |
| 1000 metres | Jorien ter Mors; Netherlands | Nao Kodaira; Japan | Miho Takagi; Japan |
| 1500 metres | Ireen Wüst; Netherlands | Miho Takagi; Japan | Marrit Leenstra; Netherlands |
| 3000 metres | Carlijn Achtereekte; Netherlands | Ireen Wüst; Netherlands | Antoinette de Jong; Netherlands |
| 5000 metres | Esmee Visser; Netherlands | Martina Sáblíková; Czech Republic | Natalya Voronina; Olympic Athletes from Russia |
| Mass start | Nana Takagi; Japan | Kim Bo-reum; South Korea | Irene Schouten; Netherlands |
| Team pursuit | Japan; Miho Takagi; Ayano Sato; Nana Takagi; Ayaka Kikuchi | Netherlands; Marrit Leenstra; Ireen Wüst; Antoinette de Jong; Lotte van Beek | United States; Heather Bergsma; Brittany Bowe; Mia Manganello; Carlijn Schoutens |

== See also ==
- 2018 Winter Olympics medal table
