= Sebastian Foss-Solevåg =

Norwegian alpine skier (born 1991)

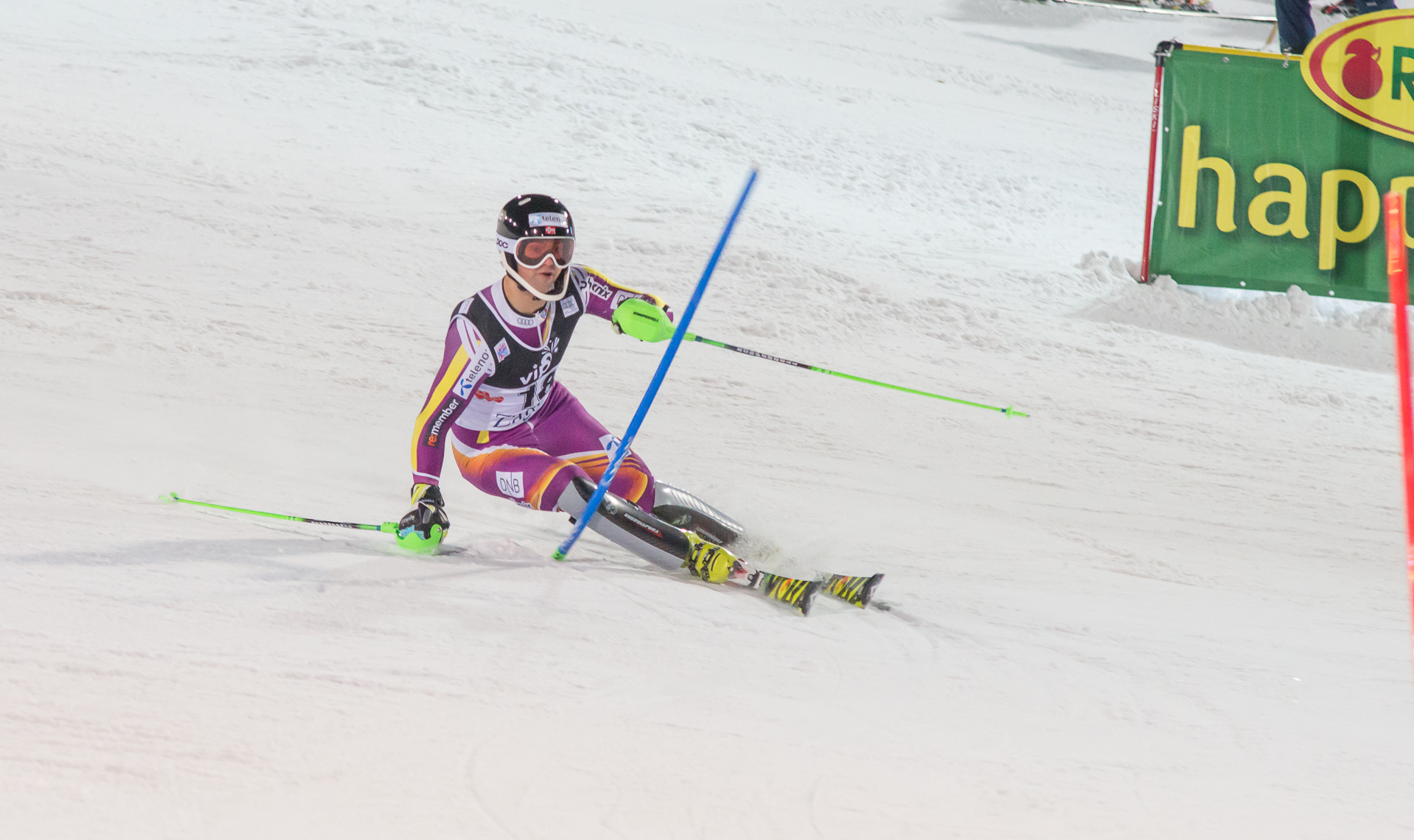
- At Zagreb in 2015

Personal information
- Born: 13 July 1991 (age 35) Ålesund, Norway
- Height: 1.82 m (6 ft 0 in)

Skiing career
- Sport: Alpine skiing
- Club: Spjelkavik IL
- Disciplines: Slalom
- World Cup debut: 17 November 2012 (age 22)

Olympics
- Teams: 3 – (2014, 2018, 2022)
- Medals: 2 (1 team, 1 individual) (0 gold)

World Championships
- Teams: 5 – (2015–2023)
- Medals: 2 (2 gold)

World Cup
- Seasons: 13 – (2013–2025)
- Wins: 2 – (2 SL)
- Podiums: 5 – (5 SL)
- Overall titles: 0 – (14th in 2021)
- Discipline titles: 0 – (5th in SL, 2020, 2021)
Medal record
Men's alpine skiing
Representing Norway
Olympic Games
Bronze medal – third place	2018 Pyeongchang	Team event
Bronze medal – third place	2022 Beijing	Slalom
World Championships
Gold medal – first place	2021 Cortina d’Ampezzo	Slalom
Gold medal – first place	2021 Cortina d’Ampezzo	Team event

Sebastian Foss-Solevåg (born 13 July 1991) is a Norwegian former World Cup alpine ski racer who specialised in slalom. He is world champion, Olympic bronze medalist and three times national champion in slalom.

== Career ==
Born in Ålesund, he competed at the 2014 Winter Olympics in Sochi, in slalom where he placed ninth.

Foss-Solevåg's first World Cup podium came in January 2015 at Zagreb, Croatia, and his first win came six years later at Flachau, Austria. He won the gold medal in the slalom at the World Championships in 2021, and won another in the team event.

At the 2018 Winter Olympics he won a bronze medal in the mixed team competition, along with Nina Haver-Løseth, Kristin Lysdahl, Maren Skjøld, Leif Kristian Nestvold-Haugen and Jonathan Nordbotten.

Competing at the 2022 Winter Olympics he won a bronze medal in men's slalom, behind Clément Noël and Johannes Strolz.

Foss Solevåg became national champion in slalom in 2013, 2015 and 2021.

He retired from competitions in 2025.

== Personal life ==
Foss Solevåg was born in Ålesund on 13 July 1991.

== World Cup results ==
=== Season standings ===
Season	Age	Overall	Slalom	Giant slalom	Super-G	Downhill	Combined	Parallel
2014	22	72	26	—	—	—	—	—N/a
2015	23	35	9	—	—	—	—	—N/a
2016	24	45	11	—	—	—	—	—N/a
2017	25	56	18	—	—	—	—	—N/a
2018	26	29	8	—	—	—	40	—N/a
2019	27	50	17	—	—	—	—	—N/a
2020	28	25	5	—	—	—	—	—
2021	29	14	5	—	—	—	—N/a	—
2022	30	32	10	—	—	—	—N/a	—
2023	31	54	21	—	—	—	—N/a	—N/a

=== Race podiums ===
- 2 wins – (2 SL)
- 5 podiums – (5 SL)

Season	Date	Location	Discipline	Place
2015	6 Jan 2015	Zagreb, Croatia	Slalom	3rd
2016	20 Mar 2016	St. Moritz, Switzerland	Slalom	3rd
2021	22 Dec 2020	Madonna di Campiglio, Italy	Slalom	2nd
2021	17 Jan 2021	Flachau, Austria	Slalom	1st
2022	22 Dec 2021	Madonna di Campiglio, Italy	Slalom	1st

== World Championship results ==
Year	Age	Slalom	Giant slalom	Super-G	Downhill	Combined	Team event
2015	23	9	—	—	—	—	5
2017	25	DNF1	—	—	—	—	5
2019	27	12	—	—	—	34	5
2021	29	1	—	—	—	—	1
2023	31	19	—	—	—	—	—

== Olympic results ==
Year	Age	Slalom	Giant slalom	Super-G	Downhill	Combined	Team event
2014	22	9	—	—	—	—	not run
2018	26	10	—	—	—	DNF2	3
2022	30	3	—	—	—	—	—
