= Alpine skiing at the 2018 Winter Olympics – Mixed team =

Mixed team at the XXIII Olympic Winter Games
- Alpine skiing
- Venue: Yongpyong Alpine Centre, Pyeongchang, South Korea
- Date: 24 February 2018
- Competitors: 80 from 16 nations

Medalists
1st place, gold medalist(s)		Luca Aerni; Denise Feierabend; Wendy Holdener; Daniel Yule; Ramon Zenhäusern	Switzerland
2nd place, silver medalist(s)		Stephanie Brunner; Manuel Feller; Katharina Gallhuber; Katharina Liensberger; Michael Matt; Marco Schwarz	Austria
3rd place, bronze medalist(s)		Sebastian Foss-Solevåg; Nina Haver-Løseth; Kristin Lysdahl; Leif Kristian Nestvold-Haugen; Jonathan Nordbotten; Maren Skjøld	Norway

The team event competition of the PyeongChang 2018 Olympics was held on 24 February 2018 at the Yongpyong Alpine Centre in PyeongChang.

== Rules ==
This was a parallel slalom competition. There were four members on each team (two males and two females), as well as two reserves. There were four races and the winner of each race scored a point for their team (a tied race awards one point per team). The first race was female against female, race two was male against male, race three was female against female and the last race was male against male. If, after four races, both teams had the same number of points, then the race times of each team's fastest man and woman would be added and the team with the best aggregate time won. If there were two non finishes in the same race, whoever progressed further would win the race.

== Qualified teams ==
Teams and participating athletes:

- Austria
  - Stephanie Brunner
  - Katharina Gallhuber
  - Katharina Liensberger
  - Manuel Feller
  - Michael Matt
  - Marco Schwarz
- Canada
  - Candace Crawford
  - Erin Mielzynski
  - Laurence St. Germain
  - Phil Brown
  - Trevor Philp
  - Erik Read
- Czech Republic
  - Gabriela Capová
  - Martina Dubovská
  - Kateřina Pauláthová
  - Ondřej Berndt
  - Filip Forejtek
  - Jan Zabystřan
- France
  - Adeline Baud Mugnier
  - Nastasia Noens
  - Tessa Worley
  - Julien Lizeroux
  - Clément Noël
  - Alexis Pinturault
- Germany
  - Lena Dürr
  - Marina Wallner
  - Fritz Dopfer
  - Alexander Schmid
  - Linus Straßer
- Great Britain
  - Charlotte Guest
  - Alexandra Tilley
  - Dave Ryding
  - Laurie Taylor
- Hungary
  - Szonja Hozmann
  - Mariann Mimi Maróty
  - Márton Kékesi
  - Dalibor Šamšal
- Italy
  - Federica Brignone
  - Chiara Costazza
  - Irene Curtoni
  - Stefano Gross
  - Riccardo Tonetti
  - Alex Vinatzer
- Norway
  - Nina Haver-Løseth
  - Kristin Lysdahl
  - Maren Skjøld
  - Sebastian Foss-Solevåg
  - Leif Kristian Nestvold-Haugen
  - Jonathan Nordbotten
- Olympic Athletes from Russia
  - Anastasiia Silanteva
  - Ekaterina Tkachenko
  - Aleksandr Khoroshilov
  - Ivan Kuznetsov
- Slovakia
  - Soňa Moravčíková
  - Veronika Velez-Zuzulová
  - Petra Vlhová
  - Matej Falat
  - Adam Žampa
  - Andreas Žampa
- Slovenia
  - Ana Bucik
  - Maruša Ferk
  - Tina Robnik
  - Štefan Hadalin
  - Žan Kranjec
- South Korea
  - Gim So-hui
  - Kang Young-seo
  - Jung Dong-hyun
  - Kim Dong-woo
- Sweden
  - Frida Hansdotter
  - Anna Swenn-Larsson
  - Emelie Wikström
  - Mattias Hargin
  - Kristoffer Jakobsen
  - André Myhrer
- Switzerland
  - Denise Feierabend
  - Wendy Holdener
  - Luca Aerni
  - Daniel Yule
  - Ramon Zenhäusern
- United States
  - Patricia Mangan
  - Megan McJames
  - Alice Merryweather
  - David Chodounsky
  - Mark Engel
  - Nolan Kasper

== FIS Overall Nations Cup standings ==
The participating nations were seeded according to the Overall Nations Cup standings prior to the 2018 Winter Olympics.

Rank	Country	Points
1	Austria	8497
2	Switzerland	6687
3	Italy	5457
4	Norway	4926
5	United States	3593
6	France	3569
7	Germany	3086
8	Sweden	2366
9	Slovenia	1178
10	Slovakia	817
11	Liechtenstein	697
12	Canada	620
13	Great Britain	267
14	Olympic Athletes from Russia	178
15	Croatia	131
16	Czech Republic	105
17	Serbia	78
18	Japan	42
19	Hungary	18
20	Netherlands	16
21	Finland	15
22	Poland	14
23	South Korea	4
24	Monaco	3

== Results ==
The race was started at 11:00.

=== Bracket ===
Round of 16
Austria	4
South Korea	0
Sweden	3
Slovenia	1
United States	2
Great Britain	2*
Norway	4
Olympic Athletes from Russia	0
Italy	3
Czech Republic	1
France	2*
Canada	2
Germany	2*
Slovakia	2
Switzerland	4
Hungary	0

Quarterfinals
Austria	4
Sweden	0
Great Britain	2
Norway	2*
Italy	1
France	3
Germany	2
Switzerland	2*

Semifinals
Austria	3
Norway	1
France	1
Switzerland	3

Final
Austria	1
Switzerland	3
Third place
Norway	2*
France	2

Notes

- Teams marked with asterisks won by faster cumulated time of the best male and the best female skier.
