= 2019–20 FIS Alpine Ski World Cup =

International sports competition

Discipline	Men	Women
Overall	(Norway) Aleksander Aamodt Kilde	(Italy) Federica Brignone
Downhill	(Switzerland) Beat Feuz	(Switzerland) Corinne Suter
Super-G	(Switzerland) Mauro Caviezel	(Switzerland) Corinne Suter
Giant slalom	(Norway) Henrik Kristoffersen	(Italy) Federica Brignone
Slalom	(Norway) Henrik Kristoffersen	(Slovakia) Petra Vlhová
Alpine combined	(France) Alexis Pinturault	(Italy) Federica Brignone
Parallel	(Switzerland) Loïc Meillard	(Slovakia) Petra Vlhová
Nations Cup	Switzerland	Italy
- Nations Cup Overall: Switzerland

Competition
Locations	20 venues	17 venues
Individual	36 events	30 events
Mixed	0 event	0 event
Cancelled	12 events	16 events
Rescheduled	4 events	5 events

Overall champions

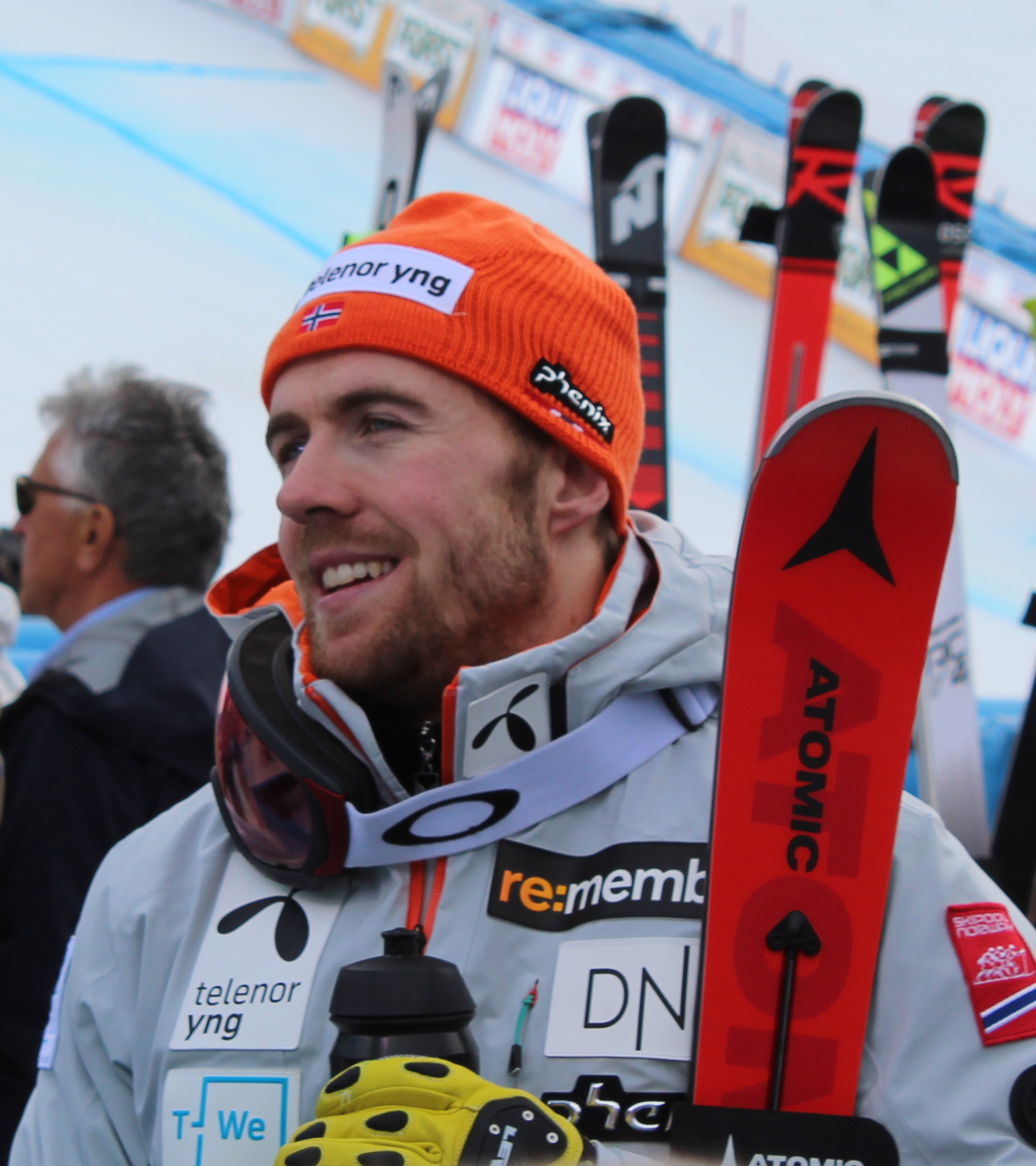
Aleksander Aamodt Kilde became the first Norwegian to win an overall World Cup title since Aksel Lund Svindal in 2008–09.

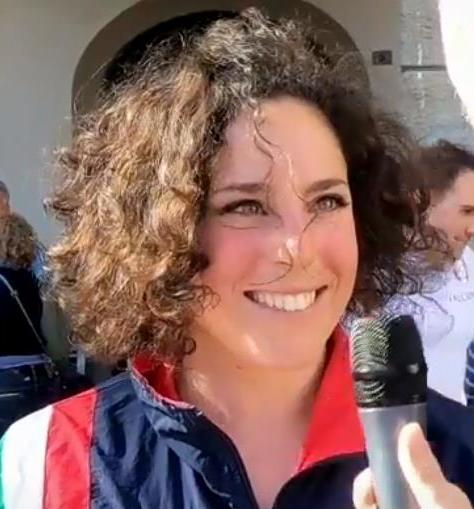
Federica Brignone became the first Italian to win an overall World Cup title since Alberto Tomba in 1994–95.

The International Ski Federation (FIS) Alpine Ski World Cup, the premier circuit for alpine skiing competition, began in January 1967, and the 2019–20 season marked the 54th consecutive year for the FIS World Cup. As it had every year since 2006 (when the Sölden races were cancelled by a snowstorm), the season began in Sölden, Austria in October. The season was supposed to end with the World Cup finals in March, which were to be held in Cortina d'Ampezzo, Italy for the first time since they began in 1993, but the finals were cancelled due to the COVID-19 outbreak in Italy.

As part of an effort to control the expansion of the World Cup circuit while fighting increased specialization, the city events were dropped this season, to be replaced by more parallel events at regular venues, while the Alpine combined was expanded. Due to the recent dominance of slalom specialists in the Alpine combined races, the format for that discipline was changed this season. As was previously the case, the first run continued to be the speed discipline (with Super-G having the preference over downhill). However, instead of the slalom run starting in reverse order of finish in the speed run, which allowed the slalom specialists (who tended to be slower in the speed run) to tackle fresh snow for their slalom run, while the speed specialists had to face the more challenging rutted snow at the end of the day, the skiers in the slalom run now started in the same order as the finish of the speed run, with the leader after the speed run becoming the first to race on the fresh slalom course.

Parallel format was also changed to make the race more TV-friendly. Parallel races now began with one classic qualification run with a single competitor on the slope (which was shown in the live TV broadcast), after which the top 32 qualifiers by time advanced to the elimination phase of the main competition. The round of 32 used the current run and re-run format, so that each competitor got to start from each side, but from the round of 16 forward, there was only one run per race and a direct knockout system. However, the new format immediately became controversial, as making two giant slalom courses equal in a single-run format proved impossible, and both the first men's and women's parallel giant slalom races suffered from "the luck of the draw" becoming determinative—in the men's race, all eight round-of-16 matches were won by the racer on the same randomly-selected course, and in the women's race, 17 of 20 winners came from the same course.

In addition, a new sixth discipline—parallel events (which combined parallel giant slalom and parallel slalom in points distribution)—was introduced, joining downhill, Super-G, giant slalom, slalom, and combined. A small crystal globe was to be awarded to the winner.

On 1 February 2020, then-women's World Cup overall leader (and 3-time defending champion) Mikaela Shiffrin's father Jeff suffered grave injuries in an accident, and Shiffrin immediately left the World Cup tour. His injuries proved fatal, and Shiffrin remained off the tour for the rest of the season.

== Men ==
The number of races in the World Cup history

Total	DH	SG	GS	SL	AC	PS	PG	CE	K.O.	Winners
1782	496	217	419	497	134	2	6	10	1	291

including DH in Kvitfjell (7 March 2020)

=== Calendar ===
Event key: DH – Downhill, SL – Slalom, GS – Giant slalom, SG – Super giant slalom, AC – Alpine combined, PG – Parallel giant slalom
#	Event	Date	Venue	Type	Winner	Second	Third	Details
1747	1	27 October 2019	(Austria) Sölden	GS _{413}	(France) Alexis Pinturault	(France) Mathieu Faivre	(Slovenia) Žan Kranjec	
1748	2	24 November 2019	(Finland) Levi	SL _{489}	(Norway) Henrik Kristoffersen	(France) Clément Noël	(Switzerland) Daniel Yule	
1749	3	30 November 2019	(Canada) Lake Louise	DH _{488}	(Germany) Thomas Dreßen	(Italy) Dominik Paris	(Switzerland) Beat Feuz (Switzerland) Carlo Janka	
1750	4	1 December 2019	(Canada) Lake Louise	SG _{212}	(Austria) Matthias Mayer	(Italy) Dominik Paris	(Austria) Vincent Kriechmayr (Switzerland) Mauro Caviezel	
1751	5	6 December 2019	(United States) Beaver Creek	SG _{213}	(Switzerland) Marco Odermatt	(Norway) Aleksander Aamodt Kilde	(Austria) Matthias Mayer	
1752	6	7 December 2019	(United States) Beaver Creek	DH _{489}	(Switzerland) Beat Feuz	(France) Johan Clarey (Austria) Vincent Kriechmayr		
1753	7	8 December 2019	(United States) Beaver Creek	GS _{414}	(United States) Tommy Ford	(Norway) Henrik Kristoffersen	(Norway) Leif Kristian Nestvold-Haugen	
		(Note: GS was originally scheduled on 14 December, but switched with Slalom to 15 December due to heavy snow on Friday. It was finally canceled after Slalom was canceled on 14 December due to strong wind and rescheduled on 15 December.) 15 December 2019	(France) Val d'Isère	GS _{cnx}	heavy snow and wind; moved to Hinterstoder on 1 March			
1754	8	(Note: Slalom was originally scheduled on 15 December, then switched with GS to 14 December, but due to strong wind again re-switched on 15 December.) 15 December 2019	(France) Val d'Isère	SL _{490}	(France) Alexis Pinturault	(Sweden) André Myhrer	(Italy) Stefano Gross	
1755	9	(Note: Super-G in Val Gardena/Gröden on 20 December 2019, was postponed three times due heavy fog in mid-section. Official final results after 48 of 64 competitors in finish. Last 16 didn't start, again due to fog.) 20 December 2019	(Italy) Val Gardena/Gröden	SG _{214}	(Austria) Vincent Kriechmayr	(Norway) Kjetil Jansrud	(Germany) Thomas Dreßen	
		21 December 2019	(Italy) Val Gardena/Gröden	DH _{cnx}	heavy snowfall; rescheduled in Bormio on 27 December			
1756	10	22 December 2019	(Italy) Alta Badia	GS _{415}	(Norway) Henrik Kristoffersen	(France) Cyprien Sarrazin	(Slovenia) Žan Kranjec	
1757	11	23 December 2019	(Italy) Alta Badia	PG _{005}	(Norway) Rasmus Windingstad	(Germany) Stefan Luitz	(Austria) Roland Leitinger	
1758	12	(Note: Canceled Downhill in Val Gardena/Gröden on 21 December 2019 is rescheduled to Bormio on 27 December 2019.) 27 December 2019	(Italy) Bormio	DH _{490}	(Italy) Dominik Paris	(Switzerland) Beat Feuz	(Austria) Matthias Mayer	
1759	13	28 December 2019	(Italy) Bormio	DH _{491}	(Italy) Dominik Paris	(Switzerland) Urs Kryenbühl	(Switzerland) Beat Feuz	
1760	14	29 December 2019	(Italy) Bormio	AC _{132}	(France) Alexis Pinturault	(Norway) Aleksander Aamodt Kilde	(Switzerland) Loïc Meillard	
1761	15	5 January 2020	(Croatia) Zagreb	SL _{491}	(France) Clément Noël	(Switzerland) Ramon Zenhäusern	(Italy) Alex Vinatzer	
1762	16	8 January 2020	(Italy) Madonna di Campiglio	SL _{492}	(Switzerland) Daniel Yule	(Norway) Henrik Kristoffersen	(France) Clément Noël	
1763	17	11 January 2020	(Switzerland) Adelboden	GS _{416}	(Slovenia) Žan Kranjec	(Croatia) Filip Zubčić	(Norway) Henrik Kristoffersen (France) Victor Muffat-Jeandet	
1764	18	12 January 2020	(Switzerland) Adelboden	SL _{493}	(Switzerland) Daniel Yule	(Norway) Henrik Kristoffersen	(Austria) Marco Schwarz	
1765	19	17 January 2020	(Switzerland) Wengen	AC _{133}	(Austria) Matthias Mayer	(France) Alexis Pinturault	(France) Victor Muffat-Jeandet	
1766	20	18 January 2020	(Switzerland) Wengen	DH _{492}	(Switzerland) Beat Feuz	(Italy) Dominik Paris	(Germany) Thomas Dreßen	
1767	21	19 January 2020	(Switzerland) Wengen	SL _{494}	(France) Clément Noël	(Norway) Henrik Kristoffersen	(Russia) Aleksandr Khoroshilov	
1768	22	24 January 2020	(Austria) Kitzbühel	SG _{215}	(Norway) Kjetil Jansrud	(Norway) Aleksander Aamodt Kilde (Austria) Matthias Mayer		
1769	23	25 January 2020	(Austria) Kitzbühel	DH _{493}	(Austria) Matthias Mayer	(Switzerland) Beat Feuz (Austria) Vincent Kriechmayr		
1770	24	26 January 2020	(Austria) Kitzbühel	SL _{495}	(Switzerland) Daniel Yule	(Austria) Marco Schwarz	(France) Clément Noël	
1771	25	28 January 2020	(Austria) Schladming	SL _{496}	(Norway) Henrik Kristoffersen	(France) Alexis Pinturault	(Switzerland) Daniel Yule	
1772	26	1 February 2020	(Germany) Garmisch-Partenkirchen	DH _{494}	(Germany) Thomas Dreßen	(Norway) Aleksander Aamodt Kilde	(France) Johan Clarey	
1773	27	2 February 2020	(Germany) Garmisch-Partenkirchen	GS _{417}	(France) Alexis Pinturault	(Switzerland) Loïc Meillard	(Norway) Leif Kristian Nestvold-Haugen	
1774	28	8 February 2020	(France) Chamonix	SL _{497}	(France) Clément Noël	(Norway) Timon Haugan	(Austria) Adrian Pertl	
1775	29	9 February 2020	(France) Chamonix	PG _{006}	(Switzerland) Loïc Meillard	(Switzerland) Thomas Tumler	(Germany) Alexander Schmid	
1776	30	(Note: Canceled Downhill in Yanqing on 15 February 2020 is rescheduled to Saalbach-Hinterglemm on 13 February 2020.)13 February 2020	(Austria) Saalbach-Hinterglemm	DH _{495}	(Germany) Thomas Dreßen	(Switzerland) Beat Feuz	(Switzerland) Mauro Caviezel	
1777	31	(Note: Canceled Super-G in Yanqing on 16 February 2020 is rescheduled to Saalbach-Hinterglemm on 14 February 2020.)14 February 2020	(Austria) Saalbach-Hinterglemm	SG _{216}	(Norway) Aleksander Aamodt Kilde	(Switzerland) Mauro Caviezel	(Germany) Thomas Dreßen	
		15 February 2020	(China) Yanqing	DH _{cnx}	Cancelled due to the coronavirus pandemic; rescheduled in Saalbach-Hinterglemm on 13–14 February			
		16 February 2020	(China) Yanqing	SG _{cnx}	Cancelled due to the coronavirus pandemic; rescheduled in Saalbach-Hinterglemm on 13–14 February			
1778	32	22 February 2020	(Japan) Naeba	GS _{418}	(Croatia) Filip Zubčić	(Switzerland) Marco Odermatt	(United States) Tommy Ford	
		23 February 2020	(Japan) Naeba	SL _{cnx}	weather conditions; strong wind			
1779	33	29 February 2020	(Austria) Hinterstoder	SG _{217}	(Austria) Vincent Kriechmayr	(Switzerland) Mauro Caviezel	(Austria) Matthias Mayer	
1780	34	(Note: Canceled Alpine combined from Hinterstoder on 28 February 2020 is rescheduled on 1 March 2020.)1 March 2020	(Austria) Hinterstoder	AC _{134}	(France) Alexis Pinturault	(Switzerland) Mauro Caviezel	(Norway) Aleksander Aamodt Kilde	
1781	35	(Note: Canceled giant slalom from Val d'Isere on 15 December 2019 is rescheduled to Hinterstoder on 2 March 2020.)2 March 2020	(Austria) Hinterstoder	GS _{419}	(France) Alexis Pinturault	(Croatia) Filip Zubčić	(Norway) Henrik Kristoffersen	
1782	36	7 March 2020	(Norway) Kvitfjell	DH _{496}	(Austria) Matthias Mayer	(Norway) Aleksander Aamodt Kilde	(Switzerland) Carlo Janka	
		8 March 2020	(Norway) Kvitfjell	SG _{cnx}	Weather conditions; rain, wind and fog			
		14 March 2020	(Slovenia) Kranjska Gora	GS _{cnx}	Cancelled due to the COVID-19 pandemic			
		15 March 2020	(Slovenia) Kranjska Gora	SL _{cnx}	Cancelled due to the COVID-19 pandemic			
		18 March 2020	(Italy) Cortina d'Ampezzo	DH _{cnx}	Cancelled due to the COVID-19 pandemic			
		19 March 2020	(Italy) Cortina d'Ampezzo	SG _{cnx}	Cancelled due to the COVID-19 pandemic			
		21 March 2020	(Italy) Cortina d'Ampezzo	GS _{cnx}	Cancelled due to the COVID-19 pandemic			
		22 March 2020	(Italy) Cortina d'Ampezzo	SL _{cnx}	Cancelled due to the COVID-19 pandemic			

=== Rankings ===
==== Overall ====
Rank	after all 36 races	Points
	(Norway) Aleksander Aamodt Kilde	1202
2	(France) Alexis Pinturault	1148
3	(Norway) Henrik Kristoffersen	1041
4	(Austria) Matthias Mayer	916
5	(Austria) Vincent Kriechmayr	794

==== Downhill ====
Rank	after all 9 races	Points
	(Switzerland) Beat Feuz	650
2	(Germany) Thomas Dreßen	438
3	(Austria) Matthias Mayer	424
4	(Norway) Aleksander Aamodt Kilde	413
5	(Italy) Dominik Paris	384

==== Super-G ====
Rank	after all 6 races	Points
	(Switzerland) Mauro Caviezel	365
2	(Austria) Vincent Kriechmayr	362
3	(Norway) Aleksander Aamodt Kilde	336
4	(Austria) Matthias Mayer	324
5	(Norway) Kjetil Jansrud	305

==== Giant slalom ====
Rank	after all 7 races	Points
	(Norway) Henrik Kristoffersen	394
2	(France) Alexis Pinturault	388
3	(Croatia) Filip Zubčić	368
4	(Slovenia) Žan Kranjec	364
5	(United States) Tommy Ford	267

==== Parallel (2 PG) ====
Rank	after all 2 races	Points
	(Switzerland) Loïc Meillard	129
2	(Norway) Rasmus Windingstad	103
3	(Germany) Stefan Luitz	82
4	(Switzerland) Thomas Tumler	80
5	(Austria) Roland Leitinger	73
	(Germany) Alexander Schmid	73

==== Slalom ====
Rank	after all 9 races	Points
	(Norway) Henrik Kristoffersen	552
2	(France) Clément Noël	550
3	(Switzerland) Daniel Yule	495
4	(Switzerland) Ramon Zenhäusern	323
5	(Norway) Sebastian Foss-Solevåg	297

==== Alpine combined ====
Rank	after all 3 races	Points
	(France) Alexis Pinturault	280
2	(Norway) Aleksander Aamodt Kilde	172
3	(Austria) Matthias Mayer	140
4	(Italy) Riccardo Tonetti	140
5	(Switzerland) Loïc Meillard	139

== Women ==
The number of races in the World Cup history

Total	DH	SG	GS	SL	AC	PS	PG	CE	K.O.	Winners
1666	417	238	418	469	106	6	1	10	1	249

including SG in La Thuile (29 February 2020)

=== Calendar ===
Event key: DH – Downhill, SL – Slalom, GS – Giant slalom, SG – Super giant slalom, AC – Alpine combined, PS – Parallel slalom, PG – Parallel giant slalom
#	Event	Date	Venue	Type	Winner	Second	Third	Details
1637	1	26 October 2019	(Austria) Sölden	GS _{413}	(New Zealand) Alice Robinson	(United States) Mikaela Shiffrin	(France) Tessa Worley	
1638	2	23 November 2019	(Finland) Levi	SL _{464}	(United States) Mikaela Shiffrin	(Switzerland) Wendy Holdener	(Austria) Katharina Truppe	
1639	3	30 November 2019	(United States) Killington	GS _{414}	(Italy) Marta Bassino	(Italy) Federica Brignone	(United States) Mikaela Shiffrin	
1640	4	1 December 2019	(United States) Killington	SL _{465}	(United States) Mikaela Shiffrin	(Slovakia) Petra Vlhová	(Sweden) Anna Swenn-Larsson	
1641	5	6 December 2019	(Canada) Lake Louise	DH _{410}	(Czech Republic) Ester Ledecká	(Switzerland) Corinne Suter	(Austria) Stephanie Venier	
1642	6	7 December 2019	(Canada) Lake Louise	DH _{411}	(Austria) Nicole Schmidhofer	(United States) Mikaela Shiffrin	(Italy) Francesca Marsaglia	
1643	7	8 December 2019	(Canada) Lake Louise	SG _{233}	(Germany) Viktoria Rebensburg	(Italy) Nicol Delago	(Switzerland) Corinne Suter	
1644	8	14 December 2019	(Switzerland) St. Moritz	SG _{234}	(Italy) Sofia Goggia	(Italy) Federica Brignone	(United States) Mikaela Shiffrin	
1645	9	15 December 2019	(Switzerland) St. Moritz	PS _{006}	(Slovakia) Petra Vlhová	(Sweden) Anna Swenn-Larsson	(Austria) Franziska Gritsch	
1646	10	17 December 2019	(France) Courchevel	GS _{415}	(Italy) Federica Brignone	(Norway) Mina Fürst Holtmann	(Switzerland) Wendy Holdener	
		21 December 2019	(France) Val d'Isère	DH _{cnx}	heavy snowfall; rescheduled in Val d'Isère on 22 December			
		22 December 2019	(France) Val d'Isère	AC _{cnx}	cancelled due to switched program schedule with downhill			
		(Note: Ladies' downhill in Val d'Isere was rescheduled from 21 to 22 December 2019 due to heavy snowfall, and was scheduled to be replaced by the alpine combined (cancelled) on 22 December 2019 due to tight schedule.)22 December 2019	(France) Val d'Isère	DH _{cnx}	cancelled for the second time; heavy snowfall again; rescheduled in Bansko on 24 January			
1647	11	28 December 2019	(Austria) Lienz	GS _{416}	(United States) Mikaela Shiffrin	(Italy) Marta Bassino	(Austria) Katharina Liensberger	
1648	12	29 December 2019	(Austria) Lienz	SL _{466}	(United States) Mikaela Shiffrin	(Slovakia) Petra Vlhová	(Switzerland) Michelle Gisin	
1649	13	4 January 2020	(Croatia) Zagreb	SL _{467}	(Slovakia) Petra Vlhová	(United States) Mikaela Shiffrin	(Austria) Katharina Liensberger	
1650	14	11 January 2020	(Austria) Altenmarkt	DH _{412}	(Switzerland) Corinne Suter	(Italy) Nicol Delago	(Switzerland) Michelle Gisin	
1651	15	12 January 2020	(Austria) Altenmarkt	AC _{105}	(Italy) Federica Brignone	(Switzerland) Wendy Holdener	(Italy) Marta Bassino	
1652	16	14 January 2020	(Austria) Flachau	SL _{468}	(Slovakia) Petra Vlhová	(Sweden) Anna Swenn-Larsson	(United States) Mikaela Shiffrin	
1653	17	18 January 2020	(Italy) Sestriere	GS _{417}	(Italy) Federica Brignone (Slovakia) Petra Vlhová		(United States) Mikaela Shiffrin	
1654	18	19 January 2020	(Italy) Sestriere	PG _{001}	(France) Clara Direz	(Austria) Elisa Mörzinger	(Italy) Marta Bassino	
1655	19	(Note: Canceled downhill from Val d'Isere on 22 December 2019 was rescheduled to Bansko on 24 January 2020.)24 January 2020	(Bulgaria) Bansko	DH _{413}	(United States) Mikaela Shiffrin	(Italy) Federica Brignone	(Switzerland) Joana Hählen	
1656	20	25 January 2020	(Bulgaria) Bansko	DH _{414}	(Italy) Elena Curtoni	(Italy) Marta Bassino	(Italy) Federica Brignone	
1657	21	26 January 2020	(Bulgaria) Bansko	SG _{235}	(United States) Mikaela Shiffrin	(Italy) Marta Bassino	(Switzerland) Lara Gut-Behrami	
		1 February 2020	(Russia) Rosa Khutor	DH _{cnx}	cancelled due to heavy snowfall; rescheduled in Crans-Montana on 21 February			
1658	22	2 February 2020	(Russia) Rosa Khutor	SG _{236}	(Italy) Federica Brignone	(Italy) Sofia Goggia	(Switzerland) Joana Hählen	
1659	23	8 February 2020	(Germany) Garmisch-Partenkirchen	DH _{415}	(Germany) Viktoria Rebensburg	(Italy) Federica Brignone	(Czech Republic) Ester Ledecká	
1660	24	9 February 2020	(Germany) Garmisch-Partenkirchen	SG _{237}	(Switzerland) Corinne Suter	(Austria) Nicole Schmidhofer	(Switzerland) Wendy Holdener	
		15 February 2020	(Slovenia) Maribor	GS _{cnx}	warm weather forecast; rescheduled in Kranjska Gora on 15–16 February			
		16 February 2020	(Slovenia) Maribor	SL _{cnx}	warm weather forecast; rescheduled in Kranjska Gora on 15–16 February			
1661	25	(Note: Canceled giant slalom from Maribor on 15 February 2020 is rescheduled to Kranjska Gora due to warm weather forecast.)15 February 2020	(Slovenia) Kranjska Gora	GS _{418}	(New Zealand) Alice Robinson	(Slovakia) Petra Vlhová	(Switzerland) Wendy Holdener (Slovenia) Meta Hrovat	
1662	26	(Note: Canceled giant slalom from Maribor on 16 February 2020 is rescheduled to Kranjska Gora due to warm weather forecast.)16 February 2020	(Slovenia) Kranjska Gora	SL _{469}	(Slovakia) Petra Vlhová	(Switzerland) Wendy Holdener	(Austria) Katharina Truppe	
1663	27	(Note: Canceled downhill from Rosa Khutor on 1 February 2020 is rescheduled to Crans-Montana on 21 February 2020.)21 February 2020	(Switzerland) Crans-Montana	DH _{416}	(Switzerland) Lara Gut-Behrami	(Switzerland) Corinne Suter	(Austria) Stephanie Venier	
1664	28	22 February 2020	(Switzerland) Crans-Montana	DH _{417}	(Switzerland) Lara Gut-Behrami	(Switzerland) Corinne Suter	(Austria) Nina Ortlieb	
1665	29	23 February 2020	(Switzerland) Crans-Montana	AC _{106}	(Italy) Federica Brignone	(Austria) Franziska Gritsch	(Czech Republic) Ester Ledecká	
1666	30	29 February 2020	(Italy) La Thuile	SG _{238}	(Austria) Nina Ortlieb	(Italy) Federica Brignone	(Switzerland) Corinne Suter	
		1 March 2020	(Italy) La Thuile	AC _{107}	heavy snowfall			
		7 March 2020	(Germany) Ofterschwang	GS _{cnx}	lack of snow and bad weather forecast			
		8 March 2020	(Germany) Ofterschwang	SL _{cnx}	lack of snow and bad weather forecast			
		12 March 2020	(Sweden) Åre	PS _{cnx}	Cancelled due to the coronavirus pandemic			
		13 March 2020	(Sweden) Åre	GS _{cnx}	Cancelled due to the coronavirus pandemic			
		14 March 2020	(Sweden) Åre	SL _{cnx}	Cancelled due to the coronavirus pandemic			
		18 March 2020	(Italy) Cortina d'Ampezzo	DH _{cnx}	Cancelled due to the coronavirus pandemic			
		19 March 2020	(Italy) Cortina d'Ampezzo	SG _{cnx}	Cancelled due to the coronavirus pandemic			
		21 March 2020	(Italy) Cortina d'Ampezzo	SL _{cnx}	Cancelled due to the coronavirus pandemic			
		22 March 2020	(Italy) Cortina d'Ampezzo	GS _{cnx}	Cancelled due to the coronavirus pandemic			

=== Rankings ===
==== Overall ====
Rank	after all 30 races	Points
	(Italy) Federica Brignone	1378
2	(United States) Mikaela Shiffrin	1225
3	(Slovakia) Petra Vlhová	1189
4	(Switzerland) Corinne Suter	837
5	(Italy) Marta Bassino	817

==== Downhill ====
Rank	after all 8 races	Points
	(Switzerland) Corinne Suter	477
2	(Czech Republic) Ester Ledecká	322
3	(Italy) Federica Brignone	320
4	(Switzerland) Lara Gut-Behrami	288
5	(United States) Mikaela Shiffrin	256

==== Super-G ====
Rank	after all 6 races	Points
	(Switzerland) Corinne Suter	360
2	(Italy) Federica Brignone	341
3	(Austria) Nicole Schmidhofer	217
4	(Switzerland) Lara Gut-Behrami	209
5	(Austria) Stephanie Venier	205

==== Giant slalom ====
Rank	after all 6 races	Points
	(Italy) Federica Brignone	407
2	(Slovakia) Petra Vlhová	333
3	(United States) Mikaela Shiffrin	314
4	(Italy) Marta Bassino	309
5	(New Zealand) Alice Robinson	300

==== Slalom ====
Rank	after all 6 races	Points
	(Slovakia) Petra Vlhová	460
2	(United States) Mikaela Shiffrin	440
3	(Austria) Katharina Liensberger	276
4	(Switzerland) Wendy Holdener	260
5	(Sweden) Anna Swenn-Larsson	235

==== Alpine combined ====
Rank	after all 2 races	Points
	(Italy) Federica Brignone	200
2	(Switzerland) Wendy Holdener	125
3	(Czech Republic) Ester Ledecká	100
4	(Austria) Franziska Gritsch	80
5	(Austria) Ramona Siebenhofer	64

==== Parallel (1 PG + 1 PS) ====
Rank	after all 2 races	Points
	(Slovakia) Petra Vlhová	113
2	(France) Clara Direz	100
3	(Italy) Federica Brignone	90
4	(Sweden) Anna Swenn-Larsson	80
	(Austria) Elisa Mörzinger	80

== Alpine team event ==
World Cup history in real time

Total	SL + SG	PGS	Winners
14	3	11	6

including PGS in Soldeu (15 March 2019)

=== Calendar ===
Event key: PG – Parallel giant slalom
#	Event	Date	Venue	Type	Winner	Second	Third	Details
		20 March 2020	(Italy) Cortina d'Ampezzo	PG _{cnx}	Cancelled due to the coronavirus pandemic			

== Nations Cup ==
Overall

Rank	after all 66 races	Points
1	Switzerland	8732
2	Austria	7694
3	Italy	6274
4	Norway	5644
5	France	5283

Men

Rank	after all 36 races	Points
1	Switzerland	4979
2	Norway	4399
3	France	4197
4	Austria	3879
5	Italy	2205

Women

Rank	after all 30 races	Points
1	Italy	4069
2	Austria	3815
3	Switzerland	3753
4	United States	1719
5	Germany	1294

== Prize money ==
Top-5 men

Rank	after all 36 races	CHF
1	(France) Alexis Pinturault	355,175
2	(Austria) Matthias Mayer	330,092
3	(Norway) Henrik Kristoffersen	293,897
4	(Norway) Aleksander Aamodt Kilde	233,442
5	(Switzerland) Daniel Yule	232,555

Top-5 women

Rank	after all 30 races	CHF
1	(United States) Mikaela Shiffrin	391,322
2	(Italy) Federica Brignone	368,150
3	(Slovakia) Petra Vlhová	338,314
4	(Switzerland) Corinne Suter	201,533
5	(Italy) Marta Bassino	155,459

== Retirements ==
The following athletes announced their retirements during or after the season:

=== Men ===
- (Italy) Henri Battilani
- (Germany) Klaus Brandner
- (France) Robin Buffet
- (Canada) Dustin Cook
- (Germany) Fritz Dopfer
- (Italy) Peter Fill
- (Finland) Jens Henttinen
- (Austria) Johannes Kröll
- (United States) Wiley Maple
- (Norway) Marcus Monsen
- (Sweden) André Myhrer
- (Sweden) Matts Olsson
- (Canada) Manuel Osborne-Paradis
- (Norway) Stian Saugestad
- (Germany) Benedikt Staubitzer
- (Germany) Dominik Stehle
- (Switzerland) Elia Zurbriggen

=== Women ===
- (Germany) Christina Ackermann
- (Slovenia) Ana Drev
- (Austria) Michaela Dygruber
- (Italy) Elena Fanchini
- (Italy) Nadia Fanchini
- (Norway) Nina Haver-Løseth
- (Germany) Veronique Hronek
- (Sweden) Helena Rapaport
- (Germany) Viktoria Rebensburg
- (Italy) Johanna Schnarf
- (Norway) Maren Skjøld
- (Sweden) Ylva Stålnacke
- (Austria) Anna Veith
- (Liechtenstein) Tina Weirather
