= Denise Feierabend =

Swiss alpine skier (born 1989)

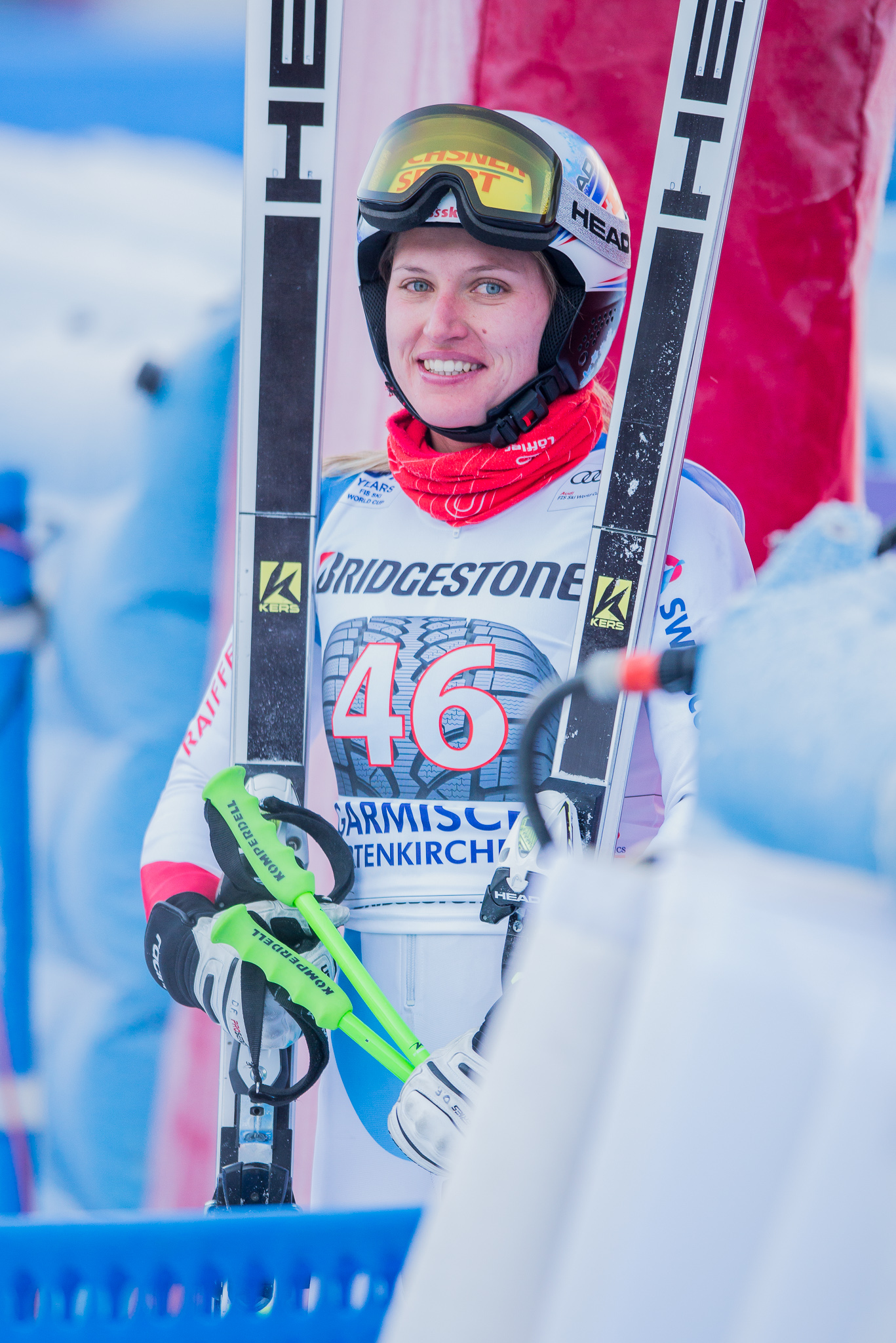
- Feierabend in 2017

Personal information
- Born: 15 April 1989 (age 37) Engelberg, Obwalden, Switzerland
- Height: 1.70 m (5 ft 7 in)
- Website: denisefeierabend.ch

Skiing career
- Sport: Alpine skiing
- Club: Engelberg
- Disciplines: Slalom, Combined, Downhill, Super-G
- World Cup debut: 5 February 2008 (age 18)

Olympics
- Teams: 2 – (2014, 2018)
- Medals: 1 (1 gold)

World Championships
- Teams: 3 – (2009, 2011, 2017)
- Medals: 0

World Cup
- Seasons: 11 – (2008–2018)
- Podiums: 0
- Overall titles: 0 – (43rd in 2014)
- Discipline titles: 0 – (8th in AC, 2016)
Medal record
Women's alpine skiing
Representing Switzerland
Olympic Games
Gold medal – first place	2018 Pyeongchang	Team event

Denise Feierabend (born 15 April 1989) is a Swiss former World Cup alpine ski racer. Born in Engelberg, Obwalden, she competed for Switzerland at the 2014 and 2018 Winter Olympics.

At the 2018 Winter Olympics in Pyeongchang, Feierabend won the gold medal in the team competition, which was held for the first time, on 24 February as part of the Swiss team (with Wendy Holdener, Luca Aerni, Daniel Yule and Ramon Zenhäusern). Three weeks after the end of the season, she announced her retirement from top-level sport on 8 April 2018.

== World Cup results ==
=== Season standings ===
Season	Age	Overall	Slalom	Giant slalom	Super-G	Downhill	Combined
2008	18	108	48	—	—	—	—
2009	19	79	31	—	—	—	34
2010	20	103	—	—	—	—	21
2011	21	61	24	—	—	—	23
2012	22	56	28	—	—	49	7
2013	23						
2014	24	43	17	—	—	—	10
2015	25	67	31	—	—	—	11
2016	26	50	28	—	35	33	8
2017	27	56	22	—	53	44	16
2018	28	23	11	—	39	43	8

- Standings through 4 February 2018

=== Race podiums ===
- 0 podiums
- 9 top tens (best finishes - fourth in slalom and combined)

== World Championship results ==
Year	Age	Slalom	Giant slalom	Super-G	Downhill	Combined
2009	19	6	—	—	—	—
2011	21	21	35	—	—	6
2013	23	—	—	—	—	—
2015	25	—	—	—	—	—
2017	27	9	—	—	—	4

== Olympic results ==
Year	Age	Slalom	Giant slalom	Super-G	Downhill	Combined	Mixed team
2014	24	17	—	—	—	12	—N/a
2018	28	14	—	—	—	9	1
