= Maren Skjøld =

Norwegian alpine skier (born 1993)

Personal information
- Full name: Maren Rotstigen Skjøld
- Born: 29 September 1993 (age 32)

Skiing career
- Sport: Alpine skiing ♀
- Club: Gjøvik SK
- Disciplines: Slalom, giant slalom
- World Cup debut: 15 January 2016 (age 22)

Olympics
- Teams: 1 – (2018)
- Medals: 1

World Championships
- Teams: 2 – (2017–2019)

World Cup
- Seasons: 5 – (2016–2020)
- Overall titles: 0 – (44th in 2017)
- Discipline titles: 0 – (12th in SL, 2017))
Medal record
Olympic Games
Bronze medal – third place	2018 Pyeongchang	Team event

Maren Rotstigen Skjøld (born 29 September 1993) is a Norwegian retired alpine skier.

At the 2014 Junior World Championships she participated in five events, with 11th place in super combined as her best result. She made her FIS Alpine Ski World Cup debut in January 2016 in Flachau, where she didn't manage to qualify for the second run, and collected her first World Cup points with a 24th-place finish in February in Crans Montana. She won the 2015-16 Alpine skiing Europa Cup overall title.

She represents the sports club Gjøvik SK.

== World Cup results ==
Season	Age	Overall	Slalom	Giant slalom	Super-G	Downhill	Combined
2016	22	92	41	—	—	—	32
2017	23	44	12	—	—	—	—
2018	24	53	20	—	—	—	34
2019	25	72	28	—	—	—	—
2020	26	105	40	—	—	—	—

=== Results per discipline ===
Discipline	Starts	Top 30	Top 15	Top 5	Podiums	Best result		
Discipline	Starts	Top 30	Top 15	Top 5	Podiums	Date	Location	Place
Slalom	28	20	8	1	0	12 November 2016	Levi, Finland	5th
Giant slalom	14	0	0	0	0	9 March 2018	Ofterschwang, Germany	40th
Super-G	2	0	0	0	0	27 February 2016	Soldeu, Andorra	48th
Downhill	0	0	0	0	0			
Combined	2	2	0	0	0	28 February 2016	Soldeu, Andorra	17th
Parallel slalom	2	2	1	1	0	20 December 2017	Courchevel, France	4th
City event	1	1	1	1	0	1 January 2018	Oslo, Norway	5th
Total	49	25	10	3	0			

Standings through 2 February 2019

== World Championship results ==
Year
Year	Age	Slalom	Giant; Slalom	Super G	Downhill	Combined	Team event
2017	23	13	—	—	—	—	5
2019	25	16	—	—	—	—	—

== Olympic results ==
Year
Year	Age	Slalom	Giant; Slalom	Super G	Downhill	Combined	Team event
2018	24	22	DNF1	—	—	—	3
