= Leif Kristian Nestvold-Haugen =

Norwegian alpine skier (born 1987)

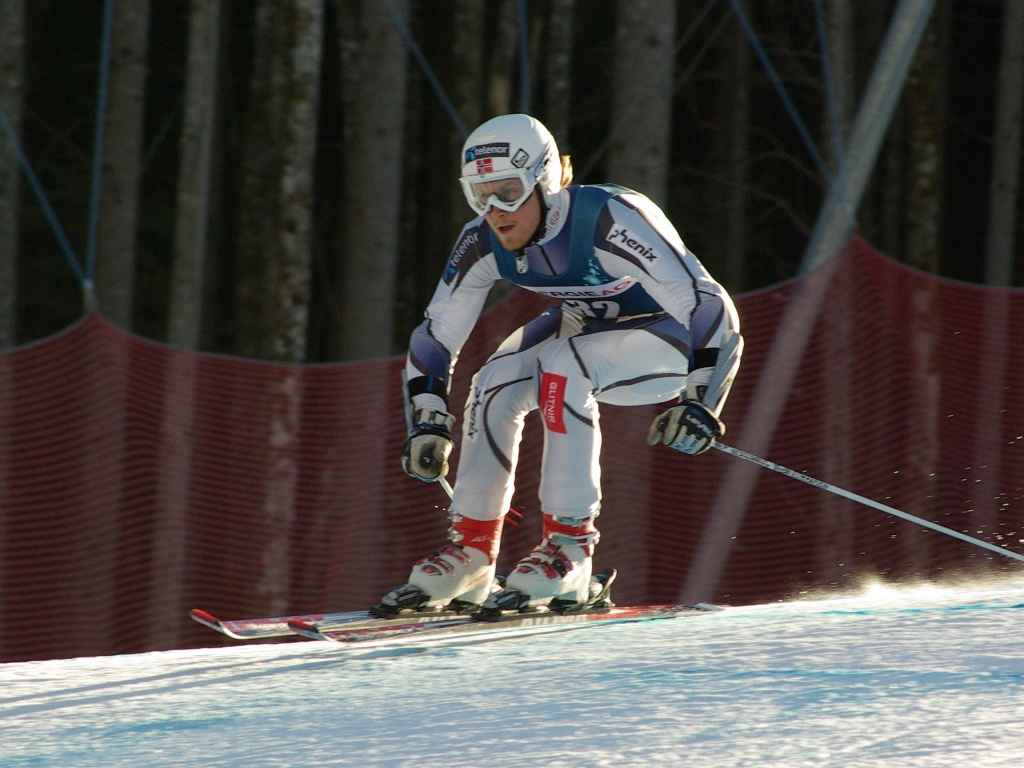
- Haugen in 2008

Personal information
- Born: 29 November 1987 (age 38) Bærum, Norway
- Height: 1.85 m (6 ft 1 in)

Skiing career
- Sport: Alpine skiing
- Club: Lommedalens IL
- Disciplines: Giant slalom, slalom
- World Cup debut: 25 October 2009 (age 21)

Olympics
- Teams: 3 – (2010, 2014, 2018)
- Medals: 1 (0 gold)

World Championships
- Teams: 6 – (2011–2019, 2023)
- Medals: 2 (0 gold)

World Cup
- Seasons: 11 – (2010–2020)
- Wins: 0
- Podiums: 3 – (3 GS)
- Overall titles: 0 – (17th in 2017)
- Discipline titles: 0 – (6th in GS, 2017, 2020)
Medal record
Men's alpine skiing
Representing Norway
Olympic Games
Bronze medal – third place	2018 Pyeongchang	Team event
World Championships
Silver medal – second place	2023 Méribel	Team event
Bronze medal – third place	2017 St. Moritz	Giant slalom

Leif Kristian Nestvold-Haugen (née Haugen, born 29 November 1987) is a Norwegian retired World Cup alpine ski racer, specializing in the technical events of giant slalom and slalom.

Haugen made his World Cup debut in October 2009 in Sölden, and collected his first World Cup points with a 26th place. He won a bronze medal in giant slalom at the World Championships in 2017 and attained his first World Cup podium in March 2017 at Kranjska Gora, Slovenia.

Nestvold-Haugen represents the sports club Lommedalens IL, and hails from Lommedalen. At the Junior World Championships, he achieved two seventh places in 2006 in Mont-Sainte-Anne and an eighth place in 2007 in Flachau.

== Personal life ==
Nestvold-Haugen is from Lommedalen, Norway. His sister is Norwegian alpine skier Kristine Gjelsten Haugen. He studied finance and international business in the United States at the University of Denver and graduated in 2012. He married Marthe Gausen Nestvold in 2017, taking her last name also.

== World Cup results ==
=== Season standings ===
Season	Age	Overall	Slalom	Giant Slalom	Parallel
2010	22	101	—	30	—N/a
2011	23	89	58	26	—
2012	24	97	40	37	—
2013	25	51	27	24	13
2014	26	36	30	10	—N/a
2015	27	44	45	11	—N/a
2016	28	41	30	13	—N/a
2017	29	17	24	6	—N/a
2018	30	24	20	8	—N/a
2019	31	40	35	13	—N/a
2020	32	21	43	6	9
2021	33	39	49	14	21
2022	34	99	—	29	21
2023	35	91	—	29	—N/a

Standings through 17 January 2021

=== Race podiums ===
- 3 podiums – (3 GS); 34 top tens

Season	Date	Location	Discipline	Place
2017	4 Mar 2017	Kranjska Gora, Slovenia	Giant slalom	2nd
2020	8 Dec 2019	(United States) Beaver Creek, USA	Giant slalom	3rd
2020	2 Feb 2020	Garmisch, Germany	Giant slalom	3rd

== World Championship results ==
Year	Age	Slalom	Giant slalom	Super-G	Downhill	Combined
2011	23	DNF2	16	—	—	—
2013	25	23	24	—	—	—
2015	27	—	DNF1	—	—	—
2017	29	15	3	—	—	—
2019	31	40	7	—	—	—

== Olympic results ==
Year	Age	Slalom	Giant slalom	Super-G	Downhill	Combined	Team event
2010	22	DNF1	28	—	—	—	—N/a
2014	26	12	16	—	—	—	—N/a
2018	30	13	8	—	—	—	3
