= Alpine skiing at the 2018 Winter Olympics =

Alpine skiing at the XXIII Olympic Winter Games
- Pictograms for speed (left) and technical (right) events
- Venues: Jeongseon Alpine Centre (speed); Yongpyong Alpine Center (technical)
- Dates: 12–24 February 2018
- No. of events: 11 (5 men, 5 women, 1 mixed)
- Competitors: 322 from 80 nations

Locations in South Korea

Alpine skiing at the 2018 Winter Olympics was held from 12 to 24 February at Yongpyong Alpine Centre (slalom and giant slalom) at the Alpensia Sports Park in PyeongChang and at the Jeongseon Alpine Centre (speed events) in Jeongseon, South Korea.

In June 2015, the International Olympic Committee approved the addition of a mixed team event, bringing the total of medal events in alpine skiing to eleven. It was the last event on the schedule.

== Qualification ==
A maximum of 320 quota spots were available to athletes to compete at the games. A maximum of twenty-two athletes could be entered by a National Olympic Committee, with a maximum of fourteen men or fourteen women. A total of sixteen countries also qualified for the inaugural team event. There were two qualification standards for the games: an A standard and a B standard.

== Competition schedule ==
Date	Time	Event
13 February	11:30; 15:00	Men's combined
15 February	10:00; 13:45	Women's giant slalom
15 February	11:30	Men's downhill
16 February	10:00; 13:15	Women's slalom
16 February	11:00	Men's super-G
17 February	12:00	Women's super-G
18 February	10:15; 13:45	Men's giant slalom
21 February	11:00	Women's downhill
22 February	10:00; 13:30	Men's slalom
22 February	11:30; 15:00	Women's combined
24 February	11:00	Team event
Source: All times are (UTC+9)

Notes

- Men's downhill was postponed (high winds) from 11 to 15 February.
- Women's giant slalom was postponed (high winds) from 12 to 15 February.
- Women's slalom was postponed (high winds) from 14 to 16 February.
- Men's super-G was postponed (scheduling conflict) from 15 to 16 February.
- Women's combined was moved forward 24 hours (due to scheduled high winds) from 23 to 22 February.

=== Course information ===
Date	Race	Start elevation	Finish elevation	Vertical drop	Course length	Average gradient
15 February	Downhill – men	1,370 m (4,495 ft)	545 m (1,788 ft)	825 m (2,707 ft)	2.965 km (1.842 mi)	27.8%
21 February	Downhill – women	1,275 m (4,183 ft)	545 m (1,788 ft)	730 m (2,395 ft)	2.775 km (1.724 mi)	26.3%
13 February	Downhill – (SC) – men	1,195 m (3,921 ft)	545 m (1,788 ft)	650 m (2,133 ft)	2.050 km (1.274 mi)	31.7%
22 February	Downhill – (SC) – women	1,275 m (4,183 ft)	545 m (1,788 ft)	730 m (2,400 ft)	2.775 km (1.724 mi)	26.3%
16 February	Super-G – men	1,195 m (3,921 ft)	545 m (1,788 ft)	650 m (2,133 ft)	2.322 km (1.443 mi)	28%
17 February	Super-G – women	1,130 m (3,707 ft)	545 m (1,788 ft)	585 m (1,919 ft)	2.010 km (1.249 mi)	29.1%
18 February	Giant slalom – men	1,405 m (4,610 ft)	965 m (3,166 ft)	440 m (1,444 ft)	1.326 km (0.824 mi)	33.2%
15 February	Giant slalom – women	1,365 m (4,478 ft)	965 m (3,166 ft)	400 m (1,312 ft)	1.250 km (0.777 mi)	32.0%
22 February	Slalom – men	1,176 m (3,858 ft)	965 m (3,166 ft)	211 m (692 ft)	0.575 km (0.357 mi)	36.7%
16 February	Slalom – women	1,169 m (3,835 ft)	965 m (3,166 ft)	204 m (669 ft)	0.556 km (0.345 mi)	36.7%
13 February	Slalom – (SC) – men	745 m (2,444 ft)	545 m (1,788 ft)	200 m (656 ft)	0.521 km (0.324 mi)	38.4%
22 February	Slalom – (SC) – women	724 m (2,375 ft)	545 m (1,788 ft)	179 m (587 ft)	0.515 km (0.320 mi)	34.8%
24 February	Team event	1,041 m (3,415 ft)	961 m (3,153 ft)	80 m (262 ft)	0.265 km (0.165 mi)	30.2%

- Estimates - data from official Olympic venue websites.

== Medal summary ==
=== Medal table ===
Rank	Nation	Gold	Silver	Bronze	Total
1	Austria	3	2	2	7
2	Switzerland	2	3	2	7
3	Sweden	2	0	0	2
4	Norway	1	4	2	7
5	United States	1	1	1	3
6	Italy	1	0	1	2
7	Czech Republic	1	0	0	1
8	France	0	1	2	3
9	Liechtenstein	0	0	1	1
Totals (9 entries)		11	11	11	33

=== Men's events ===
Event	Gold		Silver		Bronze	
Downhill	Aksel Lund Svindal; Norway	1:40.25	Kjetil Jansrud; Norway	1:40.37	Beat Feuz; Switzerland	1:40.43
Super-G	Matthias Mayer; Austria	1:24.44	Beat Feuz; Switzerland	1:24.57	Kjetil Jansrud; Norway	1:24.62
Giant slalom	Marcel Hirscher; Austria	2:18.04	Henrik Kristoffersen; Norway	2:19.31	Alexis Pinturault; France	2:19.35
Slalom	André Myhrer; Sweden	1:38.99	Ramon Zenhäusern; Switzerland	1:39.33	Michael Matt; Austria	1:39.66
Combined	Marcel Hirscher; Austria	2:06.52	Alexis Pinturault; France	2:06.75	Victor Muffat-Jeandet; France	2:07.54

=== Women's events ===
Event	Gold		Silver		Bronze	
Downhill	Sofia Goggia; Italy	1:39.22	Ragnhild Mowinckel; Norway	1:39.31	Lindsey Vonn; United States	1:39.69
Super-G	Ester Ledecká; Czech Republic	1:21.11	Anna Veith; Austria	1:21.12	Tina Weirather; Liechtenstein	1:21.22
Giant slalom	Mikaela Shiffrin; United States	2:20.02	Ragnhild Mowinckel; Norway	2:20.41	Federica Brignone; Italy	2:20.48
Slalom	Frida Hansdotter; Sweden	1:38.63	Wendy Holdener; Switzerland	1:38.68	Katharina Gallhuber; Austria	1:38.95
Combined	Michelle Gisin; Switzerland	2:20.90	Mikaela Shiffrin; United States	2:21.87	Wendy Holdener; Switzerland	2:22.34

=== Team event ===
Event	Gold	Silver	Bronze
Mixed team	Switzerland; Luca Aerni; Denise Feierabend; Wendy Holdener; Daniel Yule; Ramon Zenhäusern	Austria; Stephanie Brunner; Manuel Feller; Katharina Gallhuber; Katharina Liensberger; Michael Matt; Marco Schwarz	Norway; Sebastian Foss-Solevåg; Nina Haver-Løseth; Leif Kristian Nestvold-Haugen; Kristin Lysdahl; Jonathan Nordbotten; Maren Skjøld

== Participating nations ==
A total of 322 athletes from 80 nations (including the IOC's designation of Olympic Athletes from Russia) were scheduled to participate (the numbers of athletes are shown in parentheses).

- Albania (2)
- Andorra (3)
- Argentina (2)
- Armenia (1)
- Australia (3)
- Austria (22)
- Azerbaijan (1)
- Belarus (2)
- Belgium (4)
- Bolivia (1)
- Bosnia and Herzegovina (2)
- Brazil (1)
- Bulgaria (3)
- Canada (14)
- Chile (3)
- China (2)
- Colombia (1)
- Croatia (10)
- Cyprus (1)
- Czech Republic (9)
- Denmark (2)
- Timor-Leste (1)
- Eritrea (1)
- Estonia (2)
- Finland (2)
- France (22)
- Georgia (2)
- Germany (14)
- Great Britain (4)
- Greece (2)
- Hong Kong (1)
- Hungary (4)
- Iceland (2)
- Iran (2)
- Ireland (2)
- Israel (1)
- Italy (20)
- Japan (4)
- Kazakhstan (2)
- Kenya (1)
- Kosovo (1)
- Kyrgyzstan (1)
- Latvia (2)
- Lebanon (2)
- Liechtenstein (2)
- Lithuania (2)
- Luxembourg (1)
- Macedonia (1)
- Madagascar (1)
- Malaysia (1)
- Malta (1)
- Mexico (2)
- Moldova (1)
- Monaco (2)
- Montenegro (2)
- Morocco (1)
- New Zealand (3)
- North Korea (3)
- Norway (11)
- Olympic Athletes from Russia (5)
- Pakistan (1)
- Philippines (1)
- Poland (3)
- Portugal (1)
- Puerto Rico (1)
- Romania (2)
- San Marino (1)
- Serbia (3)
- Slovakia (7)
- Slovenia (11)
- South Africa (1)
- South Korea (4)
- Spain (2)
- Sweden (10)
- Switzerland (22)
- Thailand (2)
- Turkey (2)
- Ukraine (2)
- United States (22)
- Uzbekistan (1)
