= Jonathan Nordbotten =

Norwegian alpine skier

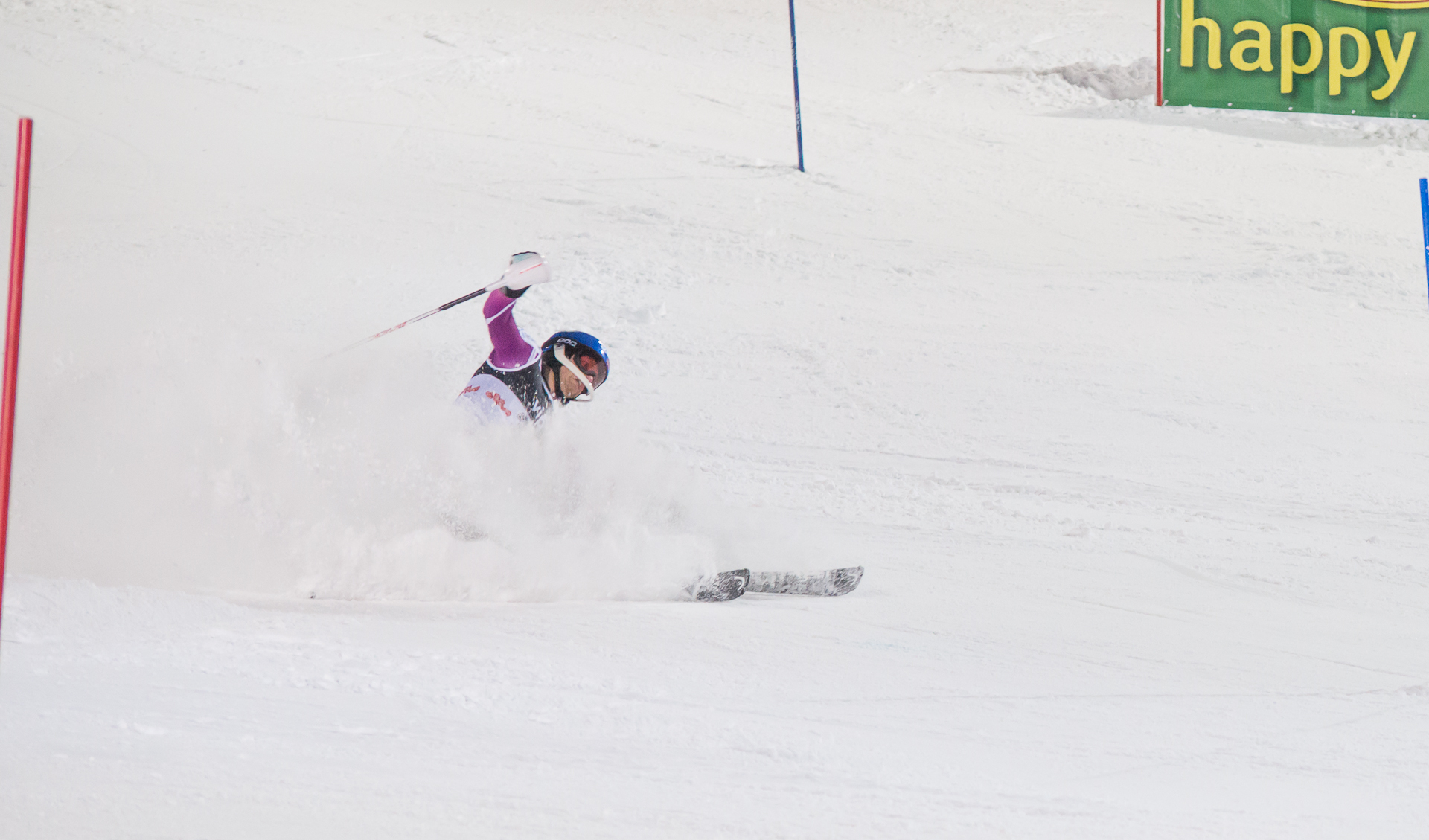
- Nordbotten in January 2015

Personal information
- Born: July 14, 1989 (age 37)

Skiing career
- Sport: Alpine skiing

Olympics
- Teams: 1 – (2018)
- Medals: 1
Medal record
Olympic Games
| Bronze medal – third place | 2018 Pyeongchang | Team event |

Jonathan Nordbotten (born 14 July 1989) is a Norwegian former alpine ski racer, who specialised in slalom.

He competed at the 2015 World Championships in Beaver Creek, USA, in the slalom., and had been on the World Cup tour and European tour since 2015. He represented Norway at the 2018 Winter Olympics in PyeongChang, South Korea.

Nordbotten skied collegiately for the University of Vermont Catamounts, where he was a five-time NCAA All-American and 2013 NCAA Slalom Champion and part of Vermont's 2012 NCAA National Championship team.

== Season standings ==
| Season | Age | Overall | Slalom | Giant slalom | Super-G | Downhill | Combined |
|---|---|---|---|---|---|---|---|
| 2012 | 22 | 126 | 47 | — | — | — | — |
| 2014 | 24 | 102 | 37 | — | — | — | — |
| 2015 | 25 | 102 | 33 | — | — | — | — |
| 2016 | 26 | 72 | 24 | — | — | — | — |
| 2017 | 27 | 55 | 17 | — | — | — | — |
| 2018 | 28 | 41 | 18 | — | — | — | — |

- Standings through 30 January 2018
