= Nina Haver-Løseth =

Norwegian alpine skier

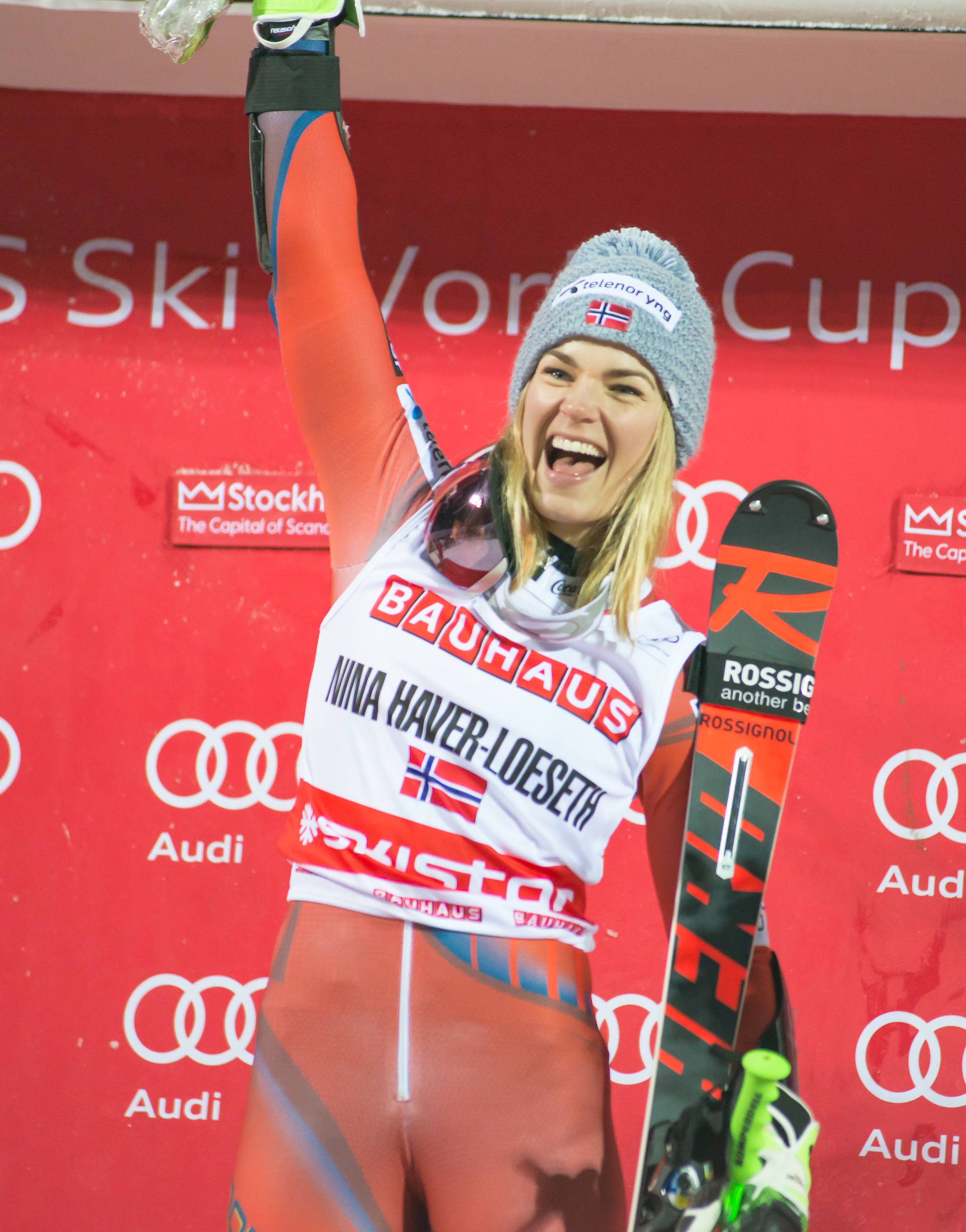
- Hammarbybacken 2018

Personal information
- Born: Nina Løseth; 27 February 1989 (age 37) Ålesund, Møre og Romsdal, Norway
- Height: 1.69 m (5 ft 7 in)

Skiing career
- Sport: Alpine skiing
- Club: Spjelkavik IL
- Retired: 19 March 2020 (age 31)
- Disciplines: Slalom, giant slalom
- World Cup debut: 5 February 2006 (age 16)

Olympics
- Teams: 2 – (2014, 2018)
- Medals: 1 (team) (0 gold)

World Championships
- Teams: 5 – (2007, 2009, 2013–17)
- Medals: 0

World Cup
- Seasons: 14 – (2006–2010, 2012–2020)
- Wins: 2 – (1 SL, 1 CE)
- Podiums: 8 – (4 SL, 2 GS, 2 CE)
- Overall titles: 0 – (9th in 2016)
- Discipline titles: 0 – (6th in GS, 2016 & SL, 2018, 2020)
Medal record
Women's alpine skiing
Representing Norway
Olympic Games
Bronze medal – third place	2018 Pyeongchang	Team event
Junior World Championships
Bronze medal – third place	2006 Quebec	Slalom
Bronze medal – third place	2009 Garmisch	Slalom

Nina Haver-Løseth (born 27 February 1989) is a retired Norwegian World Cup alpine ski racer and specializes in the technical events of slalom and giant slalom.

Haver-Løseth made her World Cup debut in February 2006, and her first podium came in a slalom race at Zagreb in January 2015. In January 2016, she gained her first World Cup win in a slalom at Santa Caterina, becoming the first Norwegian woman to win a World Cup slalom since Trine Bakke almost exactly sixteen years earlier.

At the 2007 World Championships in Sweden at Åre, Haver-Løseth was the top Norwegian female, with 30th in the giant slalom and tenth in the slalom.

Born in Ålesund, Møre og Romsdal, her sisters Lene and Mona Løseth are also alpine ski racers; she represents the Spjelkavik IL club.

== World Cup results ==
=== Season standings ===
Season	Age	Overall	Slalom	Giant Slalom	Super G	Downhill	Combined
2006	16	116	52	—	—	—	—
2007	17	59	20	44	—	—	—
2008	18	37	10	41	—	—	—
2009	19	85	30	—	—	—	—
2010	20	101	41	—	—	—	—
2011	21						
2012	22						
2013	23	56	24	47	—	—	—
2014	24	22	12	17	—	—	—
2015	25	23	10	21	—	—	—
2016	26	9	8	6	—	—	—
2017	27	12	7	14	—	—	—
2018	28	16	6	20	—	—	—
2019	29	44	18	29	—	—	—
2020	30	23	6	32	—	—	—

=== Race podiums ===
- 2 wins – (1 SL, 1 CE)
- 8 podiums – (4 SL, 2 GS, 2 CE)

Season	Date	Location	Discipline	Place
2015	4 Jan 2015	Zagreb, Croatia	Slalom	3rd
2016	13 Dec 2015	Åre, Sweden	Slalom	3rd
2016	20 Dec 2015	Courchevel, France	Giant slalom	2nd
2016	5 Jan 2016	Santa Caterina, Italy	Slalom	1st
2017	26 Nov 2016	(United States) Killington, USA	Giant slalom	2nd
2017	10 Jan 2017	Flachau, Austria	Slalom	2nd
2017	31 Jan 2017	Stockholm, Sweden	City event	3rd
2018	30 Jan 2018	Stockholm, Sweden	City event	1st

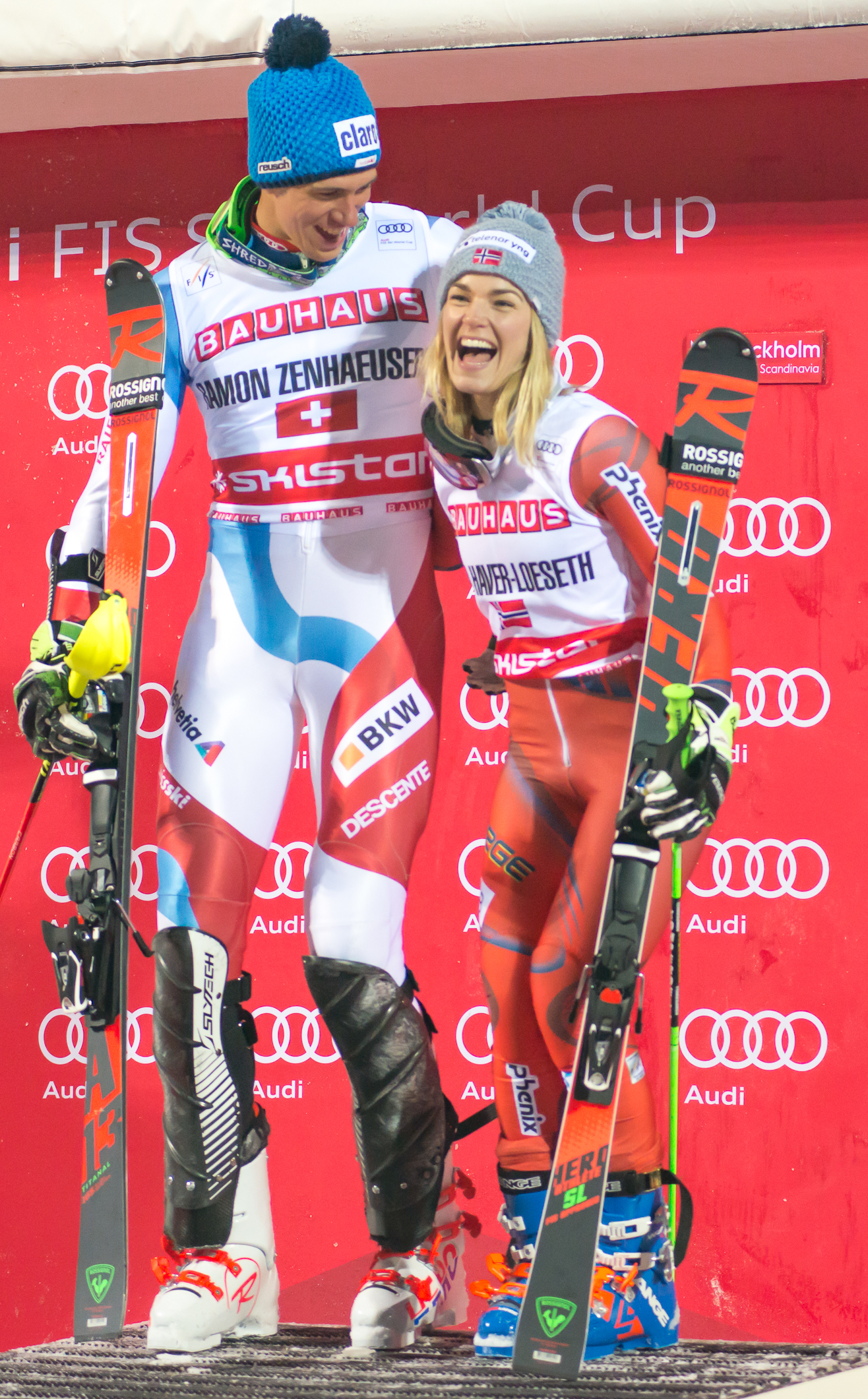
The winners in Stockholm city event 2018

== World Championship results ==
Year	Age	Slalom	Giant slalom	Super-G	Downhill	Combined
2007	17	10	30	—	—	—
2009	19	DNF1	—	—	—	—
2011	21					
2013	23	DNF1	35	—	—	—
2015	25	11	11	—	—	—
2017	27	26	10	—	—	—
2019	29	Injured, did not compete				

== Olympic results ==
Year	Age	Slalom	Giant slalom	Super-G	Downhill	Combined	Team event
2014	24	DNF1	17	—	—	—	—N/a
2018	28	6	15	—	—	—	3
