= 2017–18 FIS Alpine Ski World Cup =

International sports competition

2017–18 FIS Alpine Ski World Cup champions
Discipline	Men	Women
Overall	(Austria) Marcel Hirscher	(United States) Mikaela Shiffrin
Downhill	(Switzerland) Beat Feuz	(Italy) Sofia Goggia
Super-G	(Norway) Kjetil Jansrud	(Liechtenstein) Tina Weirather
Giant slalom	(Austria) Marcel Hirscher	(Germany) Viktoria Rebensburg
Slalom	(Austria) Marcel Hirscher	(United States) Mikaela Shiffrin
Combined	(Italy) Peter Fill	(Switzerland) Wendy Holdener
Nations Cup	Austria	Austria
- Nations Cup Overall: Austria

Competition
Locations	19 venues	21 venues
Individual	37 events	39 events
Mixed	1 event	1 event
Cancelled	2 events	6 events
Rescheduled	0 events	5 events

Overall Champions

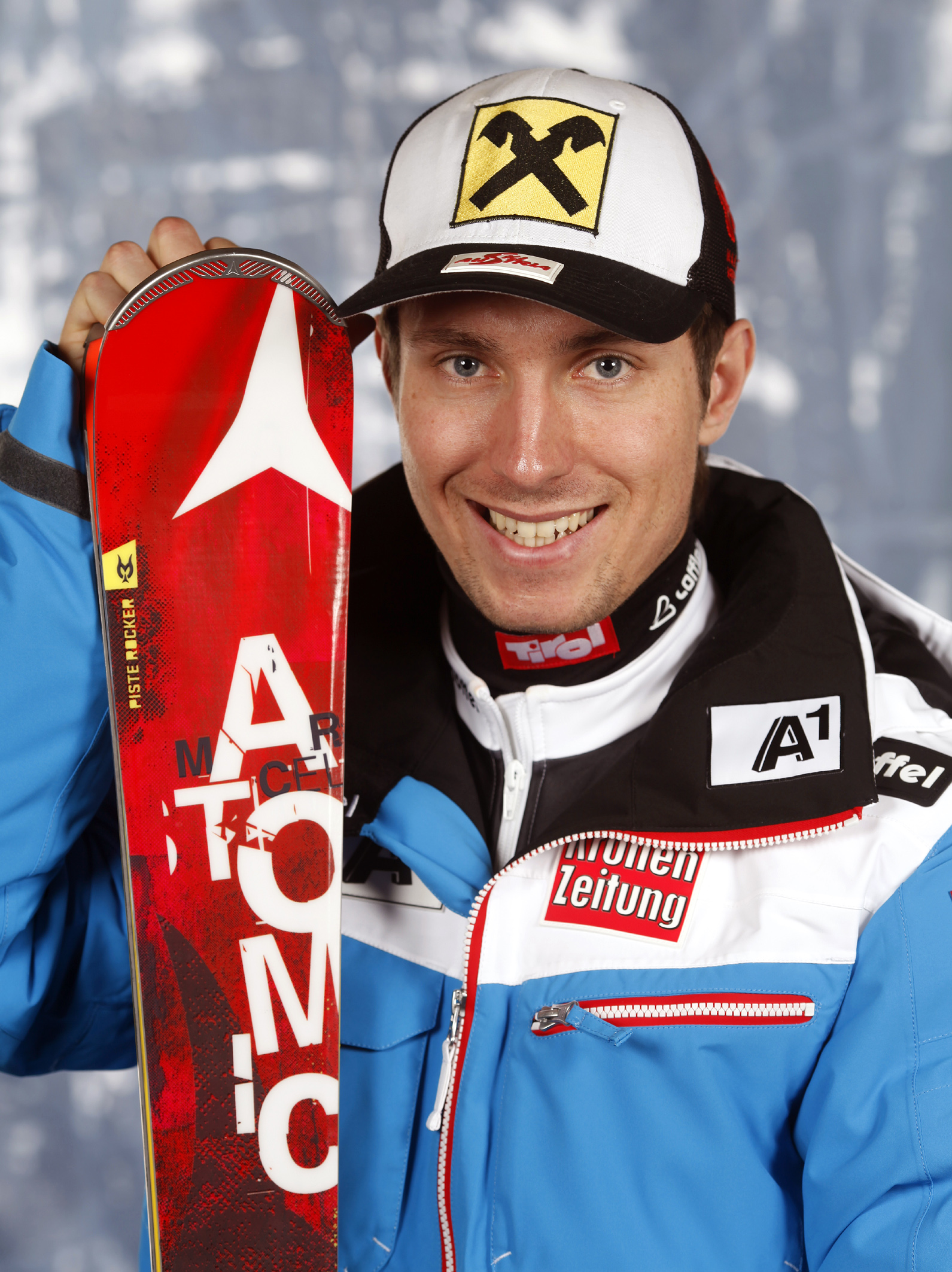
Marcel Hirscher won the overall title for the seventh successive year.

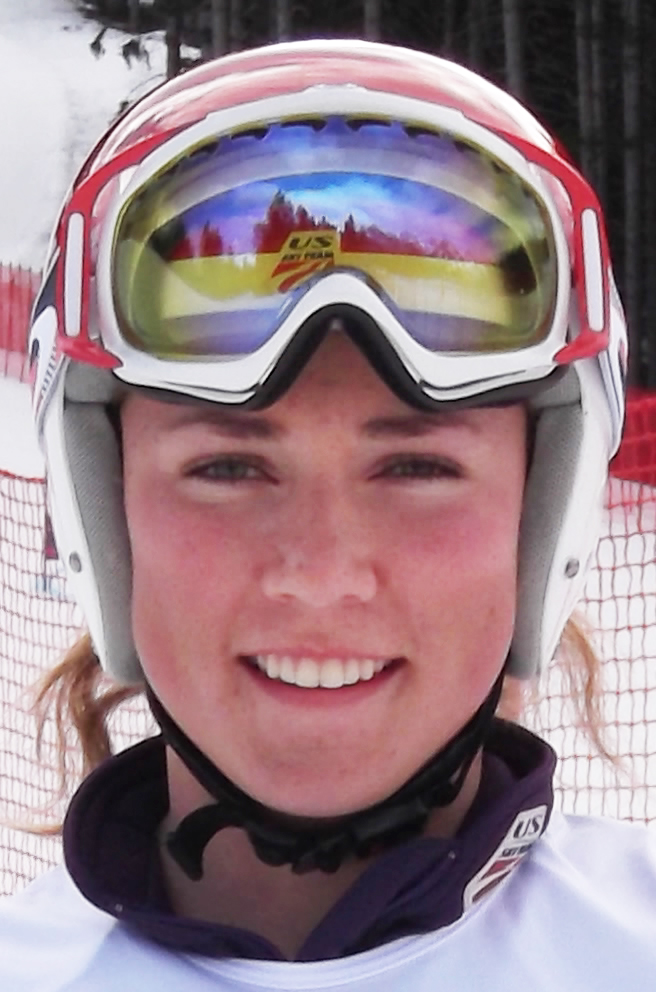
Mikaela Shiffrin won the overall title for the second successive year.

The International Ski Federation (FIS) Alpine Ski World Cup was the premier circuit for alpine skiing competition. The inaugural season launched in January 1967, and the 2017–18 season marked the 52nd consecutive year for the FIS World Cup.

This season began in October 2017 in Sölden, Austria, and concluded in mid-March at the finals in Åre, Sweden. It was interrupted for most of February by the Winter Olympics in Pyeongchang, South Korea; the speed events were held at Jeongseon Alpine Centre with the technical events at Yongpyong Alpine Centre.

== Men ==
With his seventh consecutive overall title, Marcel Hirscher of Austria broke the all-time record of six overall titles (and five consecutive) set by Annemarie Moser-Pröll during the 1970s.

=== Calendar ===
Event key: DH – Downhill, SL – Slalom, GS – Giant slalom, SG – Super giant slalom, AC – Alpine combined, CE – City Event (Parallel), PG – Parallel giant slalom
#	Event	Date	Venue	Type	Winner	Second	Third	Details
		29 October 2017	(Austria) Sölden	GS _{cnx}	excessive high winds			
1673	1	12 November 2017	(Finland) Levi	SL _{470}	(Germany) Felix Neureuther	(Norway) Henrik Kristoffersen	(Sweden) Mattias Hargin	
1674	2	25 November 2017	(Canada) Lake Louise	DH _{471}	(Switzerland) Beat Feuz	(Austria) Matthias Mayer	(Norway) Aksel Lund Svindal	
1675	3	26 November 2017	(Canada) Lake Louise	SG _{199}	(Norway) Kjetil Jansrud	(Austria) Max Franz	(Austria) Hannes Reichelt	
1676	4	1 December 2017	(United States) Beaver Creek	SG _{200}	(Austria) Vincent Kriechmayr	(Norway) Kjetil Jansrud	(Austria) Hannes Reichelt	
1677	5	2 December 2017	(United States) Beaver Creek	DH _{472}	(Norway) Aksel Lund Svindal	(Switzerland) Beat Feuz	(Germany) Thomas Dreßen	
1678	6	3 December 2017	(United States) Beaver Creek	GS _{398}	(Austria) Marcel Hirscher	(Norway) Henrik Kristoffersen	(Germany) Stefan Luitz	
1679	7	9 December 2017	(France) Val d'Isère	GS _{399}	(France) Alexis Pinturault	(Germany) Stefan Luitz	(Austria) Marcel Hirscher	
1680	8	10 December 2017	(France) Val d'Isère	SL _{471}	(Austria) Marcel Hirscher	(Norway) Henrik Kristoffersen	(Sweden) André Myhrer	
1681	9	15 December 2017	(Italy) Val Gardena/Gröden	SG _{201}	(Germany) Josef Ferstl	(Austria) Max Franz	(Austria) Matthias Mayer	
1682	10	16 December 2017	(Italy) Val Gardena/Gröden	DH _{473}	(Norway) Aksel Lund Svindal	(Norway) Kjetil Jansrud	(Austria) Max Franz	
1683	11	17 December 2017	(Italy) Alta Badia	GS _{400}	(Austria) Marcel Hirscher	(Norway) Henrik Kristoffersen	(Slovenia) Žan Kranjec	
1684	12	18 December 2017	(Italy) Alta Badia	PG _{003}	(Sweden) Matts Olsson	(Norway) Henrik Kristoffersen	(Austria) Marcel Hirscher	
1685	13	22 December 2017	(Italy) Madonna di Campiglio	SL _{472}	(Austria) Marcel Hirscher	(Switzerland) Luca Aerni	(Norway) Henrik Kristoffersen	
1686	14	28 December 2017	(Italy) Bormio	DH _{474}	(Italy) Dominik Paris	(Norway) Aksel Lund Svindal	(Norway) Kjetil Jansrud	
1687	15	29 December 2017	(Italy) Bormio	AC _{128}	(France) Alexis Pinturault	(Italy) Peter Fill	(Norway) Kjetil Jansrud	
1688	16	1 January 2018	(Norway) Oslo	CE _{007}	(Sweden) André Myhrer	(Austria) Michael Matt	(Germany) Linus Straßer	
1689	17	4 January 2018	(Croatia) Zagreb	SL _{473}	(Austria) Marcel Hirscher	(Austria) Michael Matt	(Norway) Henrik Kristoffersen	
1690	18	6 January 2018	(Switzerland) Adelboden	GS _{401}	(Austria) Marcel Hirscher	(Norway) Henrik Kristoffersen	(France) Alexis Pinturault	
1691	19	7 January 2018	(Switzerland) Adelboden	SL _{474}	(Austria) Marcel Hirscher	(Austria) Michael Matt	(Norway) Henrik Kristoffersen	
1692	20	12 January 2018	(Switzerland) Wengen	AC _{129}	(France) Victor Muffat-Jeandet	(Russia) Pavel Trikhichev	(Italy) Peter Fill	
1693	21	13 January 2018	(Switzerland) Wengen	DH _{475}	(Switzerland) Beat Feuz	(Norway) Aksel Lund Svindal	(Austria) Matthias Mayer	
1694	22	14 January 2018	(Switzerland) Wengen	SL _{475}	(Austria) Marcel Hirscher	(Norway) Henrik Kristoffersen	(Sweden) André Myhrer	
1695	23	19 January 2018	(Austria) Kitzbühel	SG _{202}	(Norway) Aksel Lund Svindal	(Norway) Kjetil Jansrud	(Austria) Matthias Mayer	
1696	24	20 January 2018	(Austria) Kitzbühel	DH _{476}	(Germany) Thomas Dreßen	(Switzerland) Beat Feuz	(Austria) Hannes Reichelt	
1697	25	21 January 2018	(Austria) Kitzbühel	SL _{476}	(Norway) Henrik Kristoffersen	(Austria) Marcel Hirscher	(Switzerland) Daniel Yule	
1698	26	23 January 2018	(Austria) Schladming	SL _{477}	(Austria) Marcel Hirscher	(Norway) Henrik Kristoffersen	(Switzerland) Daniel Yule	
1699	27	27 January 2018	(Germany) Garmisch-Partenkirchen	DH _{477}	(Switzerland) Beat Feuz	(Austria) Vincent Kriechmayr (Italy) Dominik Paris		
1700	28	28 January 2018	(Germany) Garmisch-Partenkirchen	GS _{402}	(Austria) Marcel Hirscher	(Austria) Manuel Feller	(United States) Ted Ligety	
1701	29	30 January 2018	(Sweden) Stockholm	CE _{008}	(Switzerland) Ramon Zenhäusern	(Sweden) André Myhrer	(Germany) Linus Straßer	
2018 Winter Olympics (9–25 February)
1702	30	3 March 2018	(Slovenia) Kranjska Gora	GS _{403}	(Austria) Marcel Hirscher	(Norway) Henrik Kristoffersen	(France) Alexis Pinturault	
1703	31	4 March 2018	(Slovenia) Kranjska Gora	SL _{478}	(Austria) Marcel Hirscher	(Norway) Henrik Kristoffersen	(Switzerland) Ramon Zenhäusern	
1704	32	10 March 2018	(Norway) Kvitfjell	DH _{478}	(Germany) Thomas Dreßen	(Switzerland) Beat Feuz	(Norway) Aksel Lund Svindal	
1705	33	11 March 2018	(Norway) Kvitfjell	SG _{203}	(Norway) Kjetil Jansrud	(Switzerland) Beat Feuz	(France) Brice Roger	
1706	34	14 March 2018	(Sweden) Åre	DH _{479}	(Austria) Vincent Kriechmayr (Austria) Matthias Mayer		(Switzerland) Beat Feuz	
1707	35	15 March 2018	(Sweden) Åre	SG _{204}	(Austria) Vincent Kriechmayr	(Italy) Christof Innerhofer	(Germany) Thomas Dreßen (Norway) Aksel Lund Svindal	
1708	36	17 March 2018	(Sweden) Åre	GS _{404}	(Austria) Marcel Hirscher	(Norway) Henrik Kristoffersen	(France) Victor Muffat-Jeandet	
		18 March 2018	(Sweden) Åre	SL _{cnx}	strong wind			

=== Rankings ===
==== Overall ====
Rank	after all 36 races	Points
1	(Austria) Marcel Hirscher	1620
2	(Norway) Henrik Kristoffersen	1285
3	(Norway) Aksel Lund Svindal	886
4	(Norway) Kjetil Jansrud	884
5	(Switzerland) Beat Feuz	856

==== Downhill ====
Rank	after all 9 races	Points
1	(Switzerland) Beat Feuz	682
2	(Norway) Aksel Lund Svindal	612
3	(Germany) Thomas Dreßen	446
4	(Italy) Dominik Paris	386
5	(Austria) Vincent Kriechmayr	384

==== Super G ====
Rank	after all 6 races	Points
1	(Norway) Kjetil Jansrud	400
2	(Austria) Vincent Kriechmayr	320
3	(Norway) Aksel Lund Svindal	274
4	(Austria) Hannes Reichelt	267
5	(Austria) Max Franz	226

==== Giant slalom ====
Rank	after all 8 races	Points
1	(Austria) Marcel Hirscher	720
2	(Norway) Henrik Kristoffersen	575
3	(France) Alexis Pinturault	329
4	(Austria) Manuel Feller	309
5	(Sweden) Matts Olsson	299

==== Slalom ====
Rank	after all 11 races	Points
1	(Austria) Marcel Hirscher	874
2	(Norway) Henrik Kristoffersen	710
3	(Sweden) André Myhrer	460
4	(Austria) Michael Matt	388
5	(Switzerland) Daniel Yule	370

==== Combined ====
Rank	after all 2 races	Points
1	(Italy) Peter Fill	140
2	(Norway) Kjetil Jansrud	110
3	(France) Victor Muffat-Jeandet	105
4	(France) Alexis Pinturault	100
5	(Switzerland) Mauro Caviezel	90

== Women ==
=== Calendar ===
Event key: DH – Downhill, SL – Slalom, GS – Giant slalom, SG – Super giant slalom, AC – Alpine combined, CE – City Event (Parallel), PS – Parallel Slalom (qualification run)
#	Event	Date	Venue	Type	Winner	Second	Third	Details
1564	1	28 October 2017	(Austria) Sölden	GS _{397}	(Germany) Viktoria Rebensburg	(France) Tessa Worley	(Italy) Manuela Mölgg	
1565	2	11 November 2017	(Finland) Levi	SL _{446}	(Slovakia) Petra Vlhová	(United States) Mikaela Shiffrin	(Switzerland) Wendy Holdener	
1566	3	25 November 2017	(United States) Killington	GS _{398}	(Germany) Viktoria Rebensburg	(United States) Mikaela Shiffrin	(Italy) Manuela Mölgg	
1567	4	26 November 2017	(United States) Killington	SL_{447}	(United States) Mikaela Shiffrin	(Slovakia) Petra Vlhová	(Austria) Bernadette Schild	
1568	5	1 December 2017	(Canada) Lake Louise	DH _{394}	(Austria) Cornelia Hütter	(Liechtenstein) Tina Weirather	(United States) Mikaela Shiffrin	
1569	6	2 December 2017	(Canada) Lake Louise	DH_{395}	(United States) Mikaela Shiffrin	(Germany) Viktoria Rebensburg	(Switzerland) Michelle Gisin	
1570	7	3 December 2017	(Canada) Lake Louise	SG _{219}	(Liechtenstein) Tina Weirather	(Switzerland) Lara Gut	(Austria) Nicole Schmidhofer	
		(Note: 1st run (slalom) of alpine combined in St. Moritz was finished only. Second run (Super-G) was cancelled because of heavy fog.)8 December 2017	(Switzerland) St. Moritz	AC _{cnx}	heavy fog; replaced with Super-G in St. Moritz on 10 December 2017			
1571	8	9 December 2017	(Switzerland) St. Moritz	SG_{220}	(Switzerland) Jasmine Flury	(Switzerland) Michelle Gisin	(Liechtenstein) Tina Weirather	
		(Note: special Super-G on 10 December 2017, which was supposed to count as first run of Alpine combined in St. Moritz was cancelled because of poor visibility. rescheduled to Val d'Isère on 16 December 2017)10 December 2017	(Switzerland) St. Moritz	SG _{cnx}	poor visibility; replaced in Val d'Isère on 16 December 2017			
		(Note: rescheduled from 8 December 2017, with supposed Sunday's special Super-G to count as first run of Alpine combined in St. Moritz was cancelled because of poor visibility. It will be replaced on 26 January 2018 in Lenzerheide)10 December 2017	(Switzerland) St. Moritz	AC _{cnx}	poor visibility; finally replaced in Lenzerheide on 26 January 2018			
		(Note: both ladies downhill trainings on 14 & 15 December 2017 in Val d'Isère were cancelled; for the competition at least one training should have been finished)16 December 2017	(France) Val d'Isère	DH _{cnx}	both trainings cancelled; replaced in Cortina d'Ampezzo on 19 January 2018			
1572	9	(Note: rescheduled ladies' super-G first scheduled on 10 December 2017 in St. Moritz is rescheduled to Val d'Isere on 16 December 2017)16 December 2017	(France) Val d'Isère	SG_{221}	(United States) Lindsey Vonn	(Italy) Sofia Goggia	(Norway) Ragnhild Mowinckel	
1573	10	17 December 2017	(France) Val d'Isère	SG_{222}	(Austria) Anna Veith	(Liechtenstein) Tina Weirather	(Italy) Sofia Goggia	
1574	11	19 December 2017	(France) Courchevel	GS_{399}	(United States) Mikaela Shiffrin	(France) Tessa Worley	(Italy) Manuela Mölgg	
1575	12	20 December 2017	(France) Courchevel	PS _{004}	(United States) Mikaela Shiffrin	(Slovakia) Petra Vlhová	(Italy) Irene Curtoni	
1576	13	28 December 2017	(Austria) Lienz	SL_{448}	(United States) Mikaela Shiffrin	(Switzerland) Wendy Holdener	(Sweden) Frida Hansdotter	
1577	14	29 December 2017	(Austria) Lienz	GS_{400}	(Italy) Federica Brignone	(Germany) Viktoria Rebensburg	(United States) Mikaela Shiffrin	
1578	15	1 January 2018	(Norway) Oslo	CE _{007}	(United States) Mikaela Shiffrin	(Switzerland) Wendy Holdener	(Switzerland) Mélanie Meillard	
1579	16	3 January 2018	(Croatia) Zagreb	SL_{449}	(United States) Mikaela Shiffrin	(Switzerland) Wendy Holdener	(Sweden) Frida Hansdotter	
		6 January 2018	(Slovenia) Maribor	GS_{cnx}	warm temperatures and lack of snow; replaced in Kranjska Gora on 6 January 2018			
		7 January 2018	(Slovenia) Maribor	SL_{cnx}	warm temperatures and lack of snow; replaced in Kranjska Gora on 7 January 2018			
1580	17	(Note: originally Ladies' Giant slalom was scheduled in Maribor on 6 January 2018. But because of the lack of snow, it was moved on the same day to Kranjska Gora.)6 January 2018	(Slovenia) Kranjska Gora	GS_{401}	(United States) Mikaela Shiffrin	(France) Tessa Worley	(Italy) Sofia Goggia	
1581	18	(Note: originally ladies' slalom was scheduled in Maribor on 7 January 2018. But because of the lack of snow, it was moved on the same day to Kranjska Gora.)7 January 2018	(Slovenia) Kranjska Gora	SL_{450}	(United States) Mikaela Shiffrin	(Sweden) Frida Hansdotter	(Switzerland) Wendy Holdener	
1582	19	9 January 2018	(Austria) Flachau	SL_{451}	(United States) Mikaela Shiffrin	(Austria) Bernadette Schild	(Sweden) Frida Hansdotter	
1583	20	13 January 2018	(Austria) Bad Kleinkirchheim	SG_{223}	(Italy) Federica Brignone	(Switzerland) Lara Gut	(Austria) Cornelia Hütter	
1584	21	14 January 2018	(Austria) Bad Kleinkirchheim	DH_{396}	(Italy) Sofia Goggia	(Italy) Federica Brignone	(Italy) Nadia Fanchini	
1585	22	(Note: originally scheduled ladies' downhill in Val d'Isere on 16 December 2017 is going to be replaced on 19 January 2018 in Cortina d'Ampezzo.)19 January 2018	(Italy) Cortina d'Ampezzo	DH_{397}	(Italy) Sofia Goggia	(United States) Lindsey Vonn	(United States) Mikaela Shiffrin	
1586	23	20 January 2018	(Italy) Cortina d'Ampezzo	DH_{398}	(United States) Lindsey Vonn	(Liechtenstein) Tina Weirather	(United States) Jacqueline Wiles	
1587	24	21 January 2018	(Italy) Cortina d'Ampezzo	SG_{224}	(Switzerland) Lara Gut	(Italy) Johanna Schnarf	(Austria) Nicole Schmidhofer	
1588	25	23 January 2018	(Italy) Kronplatz	GS_{402}	(Germany) Viktoria Rebensburg	(Norway) Ragnhild Mowinckel	(Italy) Federica Brignone	
1589	26	(Note: originally Alpine combined in St. Moritz was scheduled on 8 December 2017 and later moved to 10 December 2017 was then finally canceled because of the weather condition. It will be replaced here in Lenzerheide, on 26 January 2018.)26 January 2018	(Switzerland) Lenzerheide	AC _{102}	(Switzerland) Wendy Holdener	(Italy) Marta Bassino	(Slovenia) Ana Bucik	
1590	27	27 January 2018	(Switzerland) Lenzerheide	GS_{403}	(France) Tessa Worley	(Germany) Viktoria Rebensburg	(Slovenia) Meta Hrovat	
1591	28	28 January 2018	(Switzerland) Lenzerheide	SL_{452}	(Slovakia) Petra Vlhová	(Sweden) Frida Hansdotter	(Switzerland) Wendy Holdener	
1592	29	30 January 2018	(Sweden) Stockholm	CE_{008}	(Norway) Nina Haver-Løseth	(Switzerland) Wendy Holdener	(Slovakia) Petra Vlhová	
1593	30	3 February 2018	(Germany) Garmisch-Partenkirchen	DH_{399}	(United States) Lindsey Vonn	(Italy) Sofia Goggia	(Austria) Cornelia Hütter	
1594	31	4 February 2018	(Germany) Garmisch-Partenkirchen	DH_{400}	(United States) Lindsey Vonn	(Italy) Sofia Goggia	(Liechtenstein) Tina Weirather	
2018 Winter Olympics (9–25 February)
1595	32	3 March 2018	(Switzerland) Crans-Montana	SG_{225}	(Liechtenstein) Tina Weirather	(Austria) Anna Veith	(Switzerland) Wendy Holdener	
1596	33	4 March 2018	(Switzerland) Crans-Montana	AC _{103}	(Italy) Federica Brignone	(Switzerland) Michelle Gisin	(Slovakia) Petra Vlhová	
1597	34	9 March 2018	(Germany) Ofterschwang	GS_{404}	(Norway) Ragnhild Mowinckel	(Germany) Viktoria Rebensburg	(United States) Mikaela Shiffrin	
1598	35	10 March 2018	(Germany) Ofterschwang	SL_{453}	(United States) Mikaela Shiffrin	(Switzerland) Wendy Holdener	(Sweden) Frida Hansdotter	
1599	36	14 March 2018	(Sweden) Åre	DH_{401}	(United States) Lindsey Vonn	(Italy) Sofia Goggia	(United States) Alice McKennis	
1600	37	15 March 2018	(Sweden) Åre	SG_{226}	(Italy) Sofia Goggia	(Germany) Viktoria Rebensburg	(United States) Lindsey Vonn	
1601	38	17 March 2018	(Sweden) Åre	SL_{454}	(United States) Mikaela Shiffrin	(Switzerland) Wendy Holdener	(Sweden) Frida Hansdotter	
		18 March 2018	(Sweden) Åre	GS_{cnx}	strong wind			

=== Rankings ===
==== Overall ====
Rank	after all 38 races	Points
1	(United States) Mikaela Shiffrin	1773
2	(Switzerland) Wendy Holdener	1168
3	(Germany) Viktoria Rebensburg	977
4	(Italy) Sofia Goggia	958
5	(Slovakia) Petra Vlhová	888

==== Downhill ====
Rank	after all 8 races	Points
1	(Italy) Sofia Goggia	509
2	(United States) Lindsey Vonn	506
3	(Liechtenstein) Tina Weirather	394
4	(Austria) Cornelia Hütter	272
5	(United States) Mikaela Shiffrin	256

==== Super G ====
Rank	after all 8 races	Points
1	(Liechtenstein) Tina Weirather	461
2	(Switzerland) Lara Gut	375
3	(Austria) Anna Veith	339
4	(Switzerland) Michelle Gisin	313
5	(Italy) Sofia Goggia	311

==== Giant slalom ====
Rank	after all 8 races	Points
1	(Germany) Viktoria Rebensburg	582
2	(France) Tessa Worley	490
3	(United States) Mikaela Shiffrin	481
4	(Norway) Ragnhild Mowinckel	371
5	(Italy) Federica Brignone	274

==== Slalom ====
Rank	after all 12 races	Points
1	(United States) Mikaela Shiffrin	980
2	(Switzerland) Wendy Holdener	705
3	(Sweden) Frida Hansdotter	681
4	(Slovakia) Petra Vlhová	679
5	(Austria) Bernadette Schild	463

==== Combined ====
Rank	after all 2 races	Points
1	(Switzerland) Wendy Holdener	150
2	(Switzerland) Michelle Gisin	109
3	(Italy) Federica Brignone	100
4	(Italy) Marta Bassino	88
5	(Slovenia) Ana Bucik	66

== Alpine team event ==
=== Calendar ===
Event key: PG – Parallel giant slalom
#	Event	Date	Venue	Type	Winner	Second	Third	Details
13	1	16 March 2018	(Sweden) Åre	PG _{010}	Sweden Frida Hansdotter; Anna Swenn-Larsson; Emelie Wikström; Mattias Hargin; André Myhrer; Matts Olsson	France Romane Miradoli; Tessa Worley; Julien Lizeroux; Clément Noël	Germany Lena Dürr; Marina Wallner; Fritz Dopfer; Alexander Schmid; Linus Straßer	

== Nations Cup ==
Overall

Rank	after all 75 races	Points
1	Austria	10725
2	Switzerland	8441
3	Italy	6682
4	Norway	6324
5	France	4590

Men

Rank	after all 37 races	Points
1	Austria	5839
2	Norway	4596
3	Switzerland	3689
4	France	3028
5	Italy	2700

Women

Rank	after all 39 races	Points
1	Austria	4886
2	Switzerland	4752
3	Italy	3982
4	United States	3402
5	Germany	1900

== Prize money ==
Top-5 men

Rank	after all 36 races	CHF
1	(Austria) Marcel Hirscher	669,681
2	(Norway) Henrik Kristoffersen	345,071
3	(Switzerland) Beat Feuz	260,875
4	(Norway) Aksel Lund Svindal	241,000
5	(Norway) Kjetil Jansrud	210,250

Top-5 women

Rank	after all 38 races	CHF
1	(United States) Mikaela Shiffrin	702,774
2	(Switzerland) Wendy Holdener	273,794
3	(United States) Lindsey Vonn	264,430
4	(Germany) Viktoria Rebensburg	262,436
5	(Italy) Sofia Goggia	261,398

== Retirements ==
Men

- (United States) Nolan Casper
- (United States) David Chodounsky
- (Italy) Cristian Deville
- (Italy) Florian Eisath
- (France) Guillermo Fayed
- (Czech Republic) Jan Hudec
- (United States) Tim Jitloff
- (Austria) Marcel Mathis
- (Slovenia) Rok Perko
- (Finland) Marcus Sandell
- (Austria) Patrick Schweiger
- (Slovenia) Andrej Šporn
- (Italy) Patrick Thaler

Women

- (United States) Stacey Cook
- (Sweden) Nathalie Eklund
- (Switzerland) Denise Feierabend
- (Austria) Julia Grünwald
- (Austria) Michaela Kirchgasser
- (Sweden) Kajsa Kling
- (United States) Julia Mancuso
- (Hungary) Edit Miklos
- (Italy) Manuela Mölgg
- (Sweden) Maria Pietilä Holmner
- (Italy) Verena Stuffer
- (Austria) Carmen Thalmann
- (Slovakia) Veronika Velez-Zuzulova
