= Kajsa Kling =

Swedish alpine skier

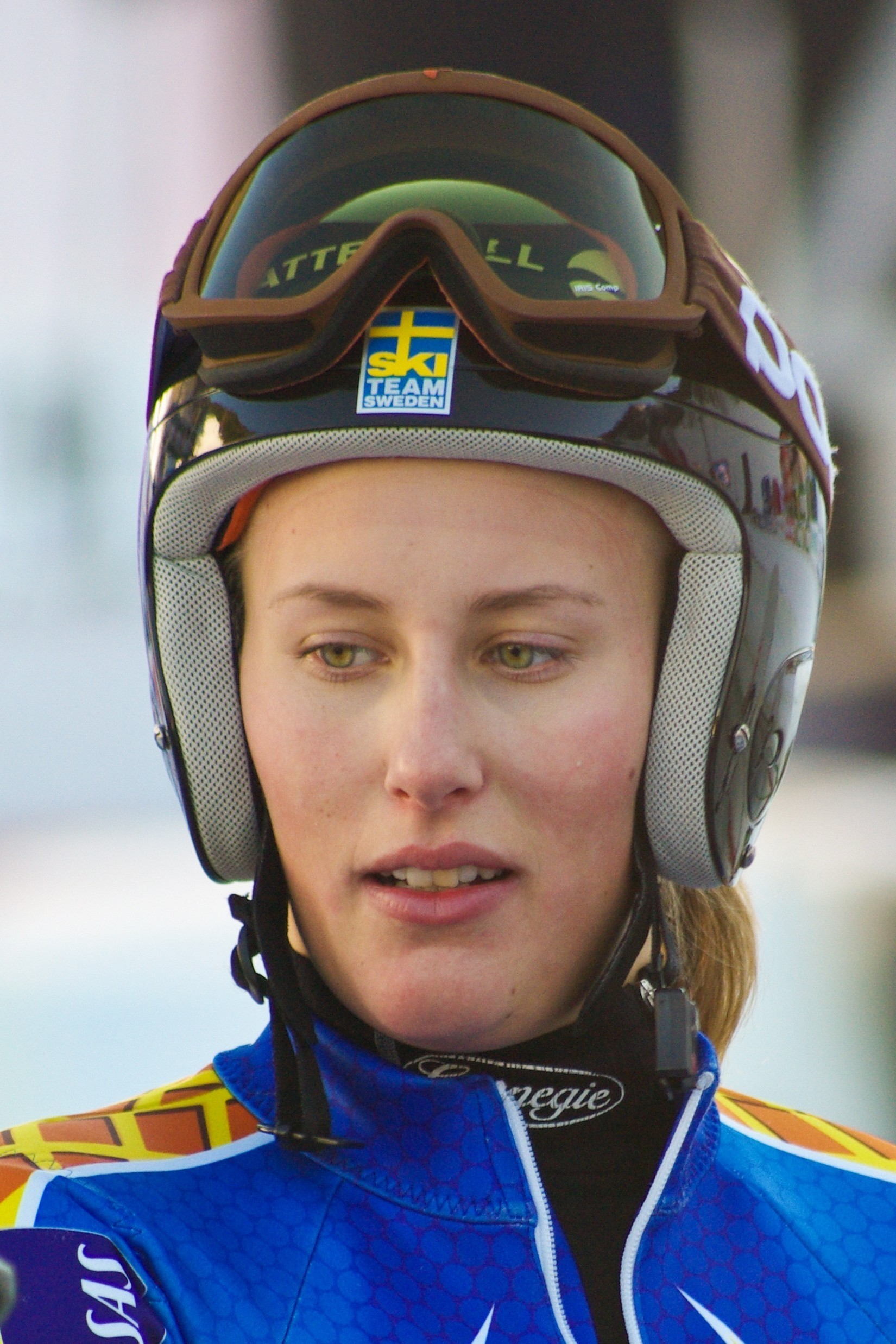
- Kling in January 2009

Personal information
- Born: 25 December 1988 (age 37) Åre, Sweden
- Height: 1.73 m (5 ft 8 in)
- Website: kajsakling.com

Skiing career
- Sport: Alpine skiing
- Club: Åre SK
- Retired: 5 March 2017 (age 28)
- Disciplines: Downhill, super-G, giant slalom, combined
- World Cup debut: 13 January 2007 (age 18)

Olympics
- Teams: 2 – (2010, 2014)
- Medals: 0

World Championships
- Teams: 3 – (2007, 2017)
- Medals: 0

World Cup
- Seasons: 10 (2008–2017)
- Wins: 0
- Podiums: 2 – (1 DH, 1 SG)
- Overall titles: 0 – (15th in 2014)
- Discipline titles: 0 – (8th in SG, 2014)

Kajsa Britta Kling (born 25 December 1988) is a retired World Cup alpine ski racer from Sweden.

Born in Åre, Kling competed in all five alpine disciplines. At the 2010 Winter Olympics, she finished 26th in the giant slalom. On 28 December 2010, Kling crashed during a giant slalom race in Semmering, Austria, which ended her 2011 season.

On 14 December 2013, Kling attained her first World Cup podium, placing second in a Super-G race in St. Moritz, Switzerland.

Ahead of the 2017/18 season, it was announced that Kling would take a break from World Cup racing because of depression. Kling set no target for a return at the time. In August 2018, Kling announced her decision not to return to the World Cup and retire from active competition.

== World Cup results ==
=== Season standings ===
Season	Age	Overall	Slalom	Giant slalom	Super-G	Downhill	Combined
2008	19	124	—	—	48	—	—
2009	20	105	—	—	51	—	34
2010	21	89	—	41	48	42	—
2011	22	86	—	39	34	43	—
2012	23	90	—	—	35	52	—
2013	24	102	—	44	—	—	39
2014	25	15	—	20	8	12	—
2015	26	27	—	37	15	15	—
2016	27	17	—	28	10	11	20
2017	28	22	—	31	10	11	36

=== Race podiums ===
- 2 podiums – (1 DH, 1 SG)

Season	Date	Location	Discipline	Place
2014	14 Dec 2013	St Moritz, Switzerland	Super-G	2nd
2017	2 Dec 2016	Lake Louise, Canada	Downhill	3rd

== World Championship results ==
Year	Age	Slalom	Giant slalom	Super-G	Downhill	Combined
2007	18	—	—	DNF1	DNF1	—
2015	26	—	—	8	18	—

== Olympic results ==
Year	Age	Slalom	Giant slalom	Super-G	Downhill	Combined
2010	21	—	26	—	—	—
2014	25	—	18	DNF1	23	—
