= Helga María Vilhjálmsdóttir =

Icelandic alpine skier (born 1995)

Personal information
- Born: 25 April 1995 (age 30) Akureyri, Iceland

Sport
- Country: Iceland
- Sport: Alpine skiing

Helga María Vilhjálmsdóttir (born 25 April 1995 in Akureyri, Iceland) is an alpine skier from Iceland. She competed for Iceland at the 2014 Winter Olympics in the alpine skiing events. She had the best results of the athletes who represented the country at the Winter Olympics as well.

On 24 August 2017 Helga broke her leg while training on the Folgefonna glacier in Norway. Due to a difficult infection in the fracture she has not been able to train since the accident. The Icelandic Health Insurance agency came to the conclusion that Helga was not entitled to injury compensation as she was training with a foreign athletic club abroad, despite she was there on behalf of the Icelandic ski national team who paid for her training as there were no suitable training sites in Iceland due to the time of year.

== World Championship results ==
Year
Year	Age	Slalom	Giant; Slalom	Super G	Downhill	Combined	Team Event
2013	17	55	55	—	—	—	—
2015	19	42	56	—	—	—	—

== Olympic results ==
Year
Year	Age	Slalom	Giant; Slalom	Super G	Downhill	Combined	Team event
2014	18	34	46	29	—	—	—N/a

== Other results ==
=== European Cup results ===
==== Results per discipline ====
Discipline	EC starts	EC Top 30	EC Top 15	EC Top 5	EC Podium	Best result		
Discipline	EC starts	EC Top 30	EC Top 15	EC Top 5	EC Podium	Date	Location	Place
Slalom	3	0	0	0	0	26 November 2012	Vemdalen, Sweden	48th
Giant slalom	3	0	0	0	0	DNQ2 3 times		
Super-G	1	0	0	0	0	2 December 2012	Kvitfjell, Norway	DNF
Downhill	0	0	0	0	0			
Combined	1	0	0	0	0	1 December 2012	Kvitfjell, Norway	DNF2
Total	8	0	0	0	0			
