= Alpine skiing at the 2014 Winter Olympics – Women's super-G =

Women's super-G at the XXII Olympic Winter Games
- Alpine skiing
- Venue: Rosa Khutor Alpine Resort; Krasnaya Polyana, Russia
- Date: 15 February 2014
- Competitors: 50 from 25 nations
- Winning time: 1:25.52

Medalists
1st place, gold medalist(s)		Anna Fenninger	Austria
2nd place, silver medalist(s)		Maria Höfl-Riesch	Germany
3rd place, bronze medalist(s)		Nicole Hosp	Austria

Women's super-G
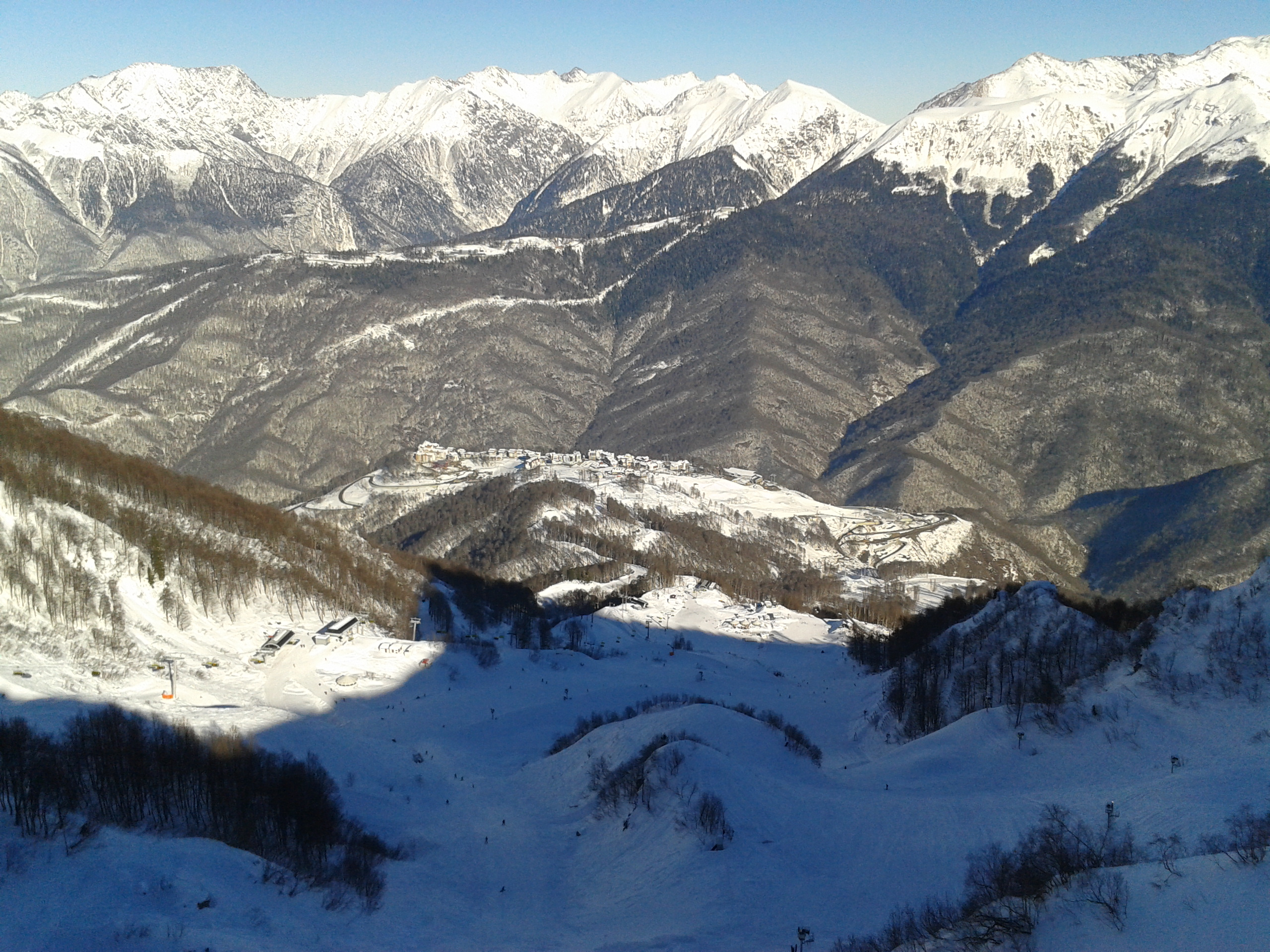
- Location: Rosa Khutor
- Vertical: 615 m (2,018 ft)
- Top elevation: 1,580 m (5,184 ft)
- Base elevation: 965 m (3,166 ft)

The women's super-G competition of the Sochi 2014 Olympics was held at the Rosa Khutor Alpine Resort near Krasnaya Polyana, Russia, on Saturday, 15 February. Anna Fenninger from Austria won the race, getting her first Olympic medal. Maria Höfl-Riesch of Germany won the silver medal, and Nicole Hosp of Austria finished third. Of the 2010 medalists, only Tina Maze participated and finished fifth.

== Summary ==
The race course was 2.100 km (1.30 mi) in length, with a vertical drop of 615 m (2,018 ft) and a starting elevation of 1,580 m (5,184 ft) above sea level. Fenninger's winning time of 85.52 seconds yielded an average speed of 88.400 km/h (54.9 mph) and an average vertical descent rate of 7.191 m/s (23.6 ft/s).

Eighteen of the 49 competitors did not finish, including seven of the first eight racers on the course.

The gold medal awarded in this event featured a fragment from the Chelyabinsk meteor to commemorate the first anniversary of this meteor strike.

== Results ==
The race was started at 11:00 local time, (UTC+4). At the starting gate, the skies were partly cloudy, the temperature was 7.0 °C (44.6 °F), and the snow condition was hard. The temperature at the finish was 9.0 °C (48.2 °F).

Rank	Bib	Name	Country	Time	Behind
1st place, gold medalist(s)	18	Anna Fenninger	Austria	1:25.52	—
2nd place, silver medalist(s)	22	Maria Höfl-Riesch	Germany	1:26.07	+0.55
3rd place, bronze medalist(s)	16	Nicole Hosp	Austria	1:26.18	+0.66
4	20	Lara Gut	Switzerland	1:26.25	+0.73
5	19	Tina Maze	Slovenia	1:26.28	+0.76
6	30	Fränzi Aufdenblatten	Switzerland	1:26.79	+1.27
7	9	Fabienne Suter	Switzerland	1:26.89	+1.37
8	14	Julia Mancuso	United States	1:27.04	+1.52
9	15	Viktoria Rebensburg	Germany	1:27.08	+1.56
10	10	Nadia Fanchini	Italy	1:27.20	+1.68
11	13	Regina Sterz	Austria	1:27.52	+2.00
11	12	Verena Stuffer	Italy	1:27.52	+2.00
13	23	Ilka Štuhec	Slovenia	1:27.69	+2.17
14	24	Lotte Smiseth Sejersted	Norway	1:27.80	+2.28
15	35	Edit Miklós	Hungary	1:27.87	+2.35
16	28	Maruša Ferk	Slovenia	1:28.19	+2.67
17	33	Klára Křížová	Czech Republic	1:28.30	+2.78
18	2	Leanne Smith	United States	1:28.38	+2.86
19	27	Ragnhild Mowinckel	Norway	1:28.53	+3.01
20	31	Marie-Pier Préfontaine	Canada	1:28.67	+3.15
21	39	Sara Hector	Sweden	1:28.71	+3.19
22	42	Barbara Kantorová	Slovakia	1:28.91	+3.39
23	34	Chemmy Alcott	Great Britain	1:29.14	+3.62
24	32	Elena Yakovishina	Russia	1:29.38	+3.86
25	43	Kateřina Pauláthová	Czech Republic	1:30.17	+4.65
26	40	Macarena Simari Birkner	Argentina	1:31.10	+5.58
27	50	Bogdana Matsotska	Ukraine	1:31.58	+6.06
28	47	Anna Berecz	Hungary	1:33.07	+7.55
29	45	Helga María Vilhjálmsdóttir	Iceland	1:33.42	+7.90
30	44	Ania Monica Caill	Romania	1:33.73	+8.21
31	49	Agnese Āboltiņa	Latvia	1:36.10	+10.58
	1	Carolina Ruiz Castillo	Spain	DNF	
	3	Daniela Merighetti	Italy	DNF	
	4	Jessica Lindell-Vikarby	Sweden	DNF	
	5	Marie-Michèle Gagnon	Canada	DNF	
	6	Marie Marchand-Arvier	France	DNF	
	7	Laurenne Ross	United States	DNF	
	8	Kajsa Kling	Sweden	DNF	
	11	Dominique Gisin	Switzerland	DNF	
	21	Elisabeth Görgl	Austria	DNF	
	25	Larisa Yurkiw	Canada	DNF	
	26	Francesca Marsaglia	Italy	DNF	
	36	Maria Bedareva	Russia	DNF	
	37	Karolina Chrapek	Poland	DNF	
	38	Greta Small	Australia	DNF	
	29	Stacey Cook	United States	DNF	
	41	Maryna Gąsienica-Daniel	Poland	DNF	
	46	Maria Shkanova	Belarus	DNF	
	48	Kristína Saalová	Slovakia	DNF	
	17	Tina Weirather	Liechtenstein	DNS	
