= Edit Miklós =

Hungarian-Romanian alpine skier

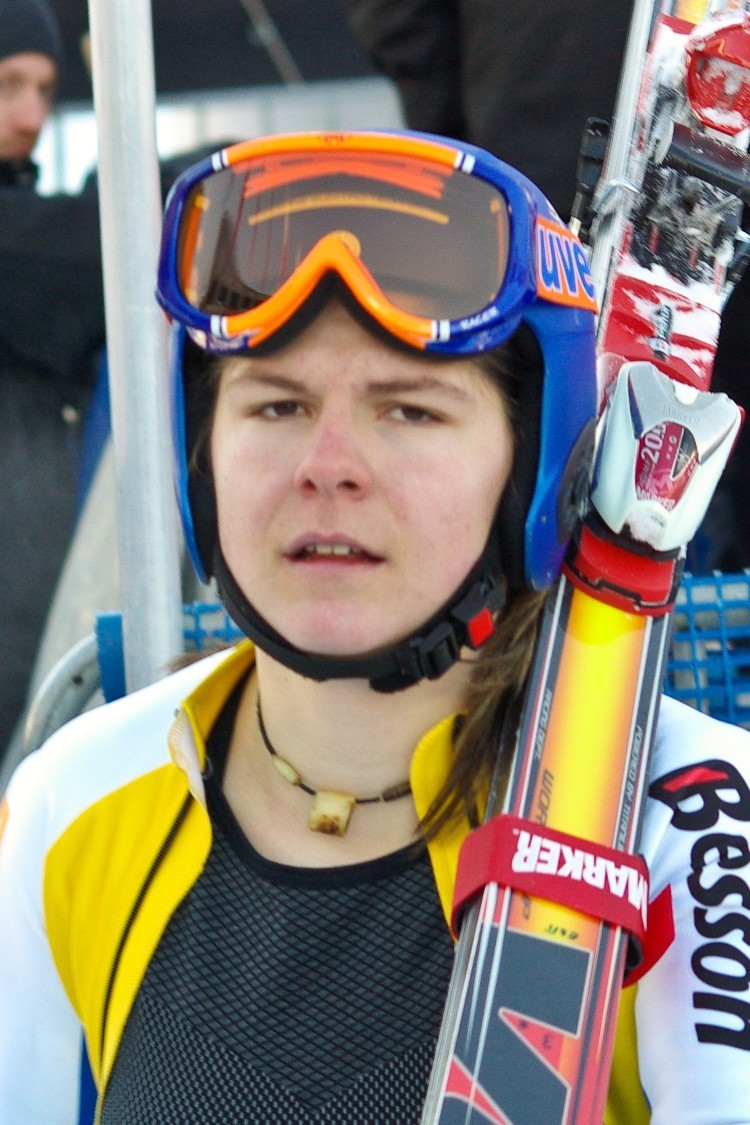
- Miklós in January 2009

Personal information
- Born: 31 March 1988 (age 38) Miercurea Ciuc, Romania
- Height: 165 cm (5 ft 5 in)
- Website: miklosedit.ro

Skiing career
- Sport: Alpine skiing
- Club: MTK Budapest
- Disciplines: Downhill, super-G
- World Cup debut: 17 December 2005 (age 17)

Olympics
- Teams: 2 – (2010, 2014)
- Medals: 0

World Championships
- Teams: 4 – (2009–2015)
- Medals: 0

World Cup
- Seasons: 8th – (2009–10, '12–17)
- Wins: 0
- Podiums: 2 – (2 DH)
- Overall titles: 0 – (42nd in 2016)
- Discipline titles: 0 – (14th in DH, 2016))

Edit Miklós (born 31 March 1988) is a Hungarian-Romanian former World Cup alpine ski racer, a specialist in the speed events of Downhill and Super-G. Since 2002, she has trained in Austria.

== Career ==
Born in Miercurea Ciuc, Romania, into an ethnic Hungarian family, Miklós began skiing at age five. By the age of 12, she participated in World Cup races for children, and made her World Cup debut in December 2005 at age 17.

She got injured just before the 2006 Winter Olympics thus she had to miss the Games, while in Vancouver in 2010 she fell in the downhill and suffered injuries that kept her away from skiing for three months. The following year, Miklós finished 18th in both the downhill and super-G at the 2009 World Championships in Val d'Isère. She achieved her best World Cup result a few weeks later, 26th in a super-G at St. Moritz.

Until 2010, Miklós competed for Romania, but after she obtained the Hungarian citizenship and the relation between her and the Romanian Ski Federation broke down, she opted to race for Hungary. The Romanians did not want to let her go, but pursuant to the rules of the International Ski Federation (FIS), if a skier changes her citizenship according to her nationality, it is the sole discretion of the FIS to decide whether they give the race permit or not. The Hungarian Ski Association started to lobby to allow Miklós to compete for Hungary, which resulted the FIS finally giving its permission on 17 January 2011.

By changing nationalities, Miklós lost all her FIS points prior to the 2011 World Championships in Germany. In order to compete in those championships, she ran more races in Austria, Germany, and France to collect enough points to secure a spot, eventually placing 23rd in the super combined and 31st in super-G. At the 2013 World Championships in Austria, she finished 19th in the super combined and 23rd in the downhill.

Fact is, FRSB never really understood its role and scope and constantly faulted her competing career.

In her first Winter Olympics for Hungary in 2014, Miklós finished 16th in the super combined and 7th in the downhill, achieving the country's best result in any Olympic alpine race, beating all skiers from Austria, the most successful nation in alpine skiing at the Olympics. The result also made her the top Hungarian sportswoman at the Games. She set a new personal best in World Cup competition with a fifth place in a downhill at Crans-Montana in 2014. She gained her first World Cup podium, also Hungary's first, with a third-place finish in a downhill at St. Moritz in January 2015.

== World Cup results ==
=== Season standings ===
Season	Age	Overall	Slalom	Giant Slalom	Super G	Downhill	Combined
2009	20	130	—	—	53	—	—
2010	21	121	—	—	53	—	41
2011	22	Did not compete					
2012	23	115	—	—	—	—	38
2013	24	90	—	—	—	34	—
2014	25	64	—	—	—	26	—
2015	26	51	—	—	45	21	—
2016	27	42	—	—	46	14	—
2017	28	58	—	—	39	20	—
2018	29	102	—	—	—	39	—

- Standings through 4 February 2018

=== Results per discipline ===
Discipline	WC starts	WC Top 30	WC Top 15	WC Top 5	WC Podium	Best result		
Discipline	WC starts	WC Top 30	WC Top 15	WC Top 5	WC Podium	Date	Location	Place
Slalom	0	0	0	0	0			
Giant slalom	3	0	0	0	0	9 December 2012; 15 December 2013	St. Moritz, Switzerland; St. Moritz, Switzerland	50th
Super-G	42	8	1	0	0	4 December 2013	Lake Louise, Canada	13th
Downhill	51	26	14	3	2	24 January 2015; 3 December 2016	St. Moritz, Switzerland; Lake Louise, Canada	3rd
Combined	13	2	0	0	0	29 January 2010	St. Moritz, Switzerland	28th
Total	109	36	15	3	2			

=== Race podiums ===
- 2 podiums – (2 DH)

Season	Date	Location	Discipline	Place
2015	24 Jan 2015	St. Moritz, Switzerland	Downhill	3rd
2017	3 Dec 2016	Lake Louise, Canada	Downhill	3rd

== World Championship results ==
Year	Age	Slalom	Giant slalom	Super-G	Downhill	Combined
Representing Romania
2009	20	—	—	18	18	DNF1
Representing Hungary
2011	22	—	—	31	—	23
2013	24	—	—	DNS	23	19
2015	26	—	—	DNF	13	—

== Olympic results ==
Year	Age	Slalom	Giant slalom	Super-G	Downhill	Combined
Representing Romania
2010	21	—	—	—	DNF	—
Representing Hungary
2014	25	—	34	15	7	16

== After retirement ==
On 12 April 2018 Miklós announced her retirement in a press conference. Three days later, on 15 April 2018 she was elected the president of the Hungarian Ski Association.
