= Barbora Lukáčová =

Slovak alpine skier (born 1990)

Personal information
- Born: 28 April 1990 (age 36) Liptovský Mikuláš, Czechoslovakia
- Height: 1.78 m (5 ft 10 in) (5' 10'')
- Weight: 75 kg / 165 lb
Medal record
Alpine skiing
Representing Slovakia

Barbora Lukáčová (born 28 April 1990 in Liptovský Mikuláš, Czechoslovakia (now Slovakia)) is an alpine skier from Slovakia. She competed for Slovakia at the 2014 Winter Olympics in the alpine skiing events.
