= World Junior Alpine Skiing Championships 2004 =

International skiing competition

The World Junior Alpine Skiing Championships 2004 were the 23rd World Junior Alpine Skiing Championships, held between 10 and 15 February 2004 in Maribor, Slovenia.

== Medal winners ==
=== Men's events ===
Event	Gold		Silver		Bronze	
Downhill	Romed Baumann; Austria	1:09.61	Silvano Varettoni; Italy	1:10.01	François Bourque; Canada	1:10.19
Super-G	Hans Olsson; Sweden	1:17.49	Manuel Osborne-Paradis; Canada	1:18.54	François Bourque; Canada	1:18.63
Giant Slalom	Jeffrey Harrison; United States	2:17.40	Kjetil Jansrud; Norway	2:18.29	Fredrik Nordh; Sweden	2:18.64
Slalom	Raphael Fässler; Switzerland	1:33.33	Ted Ligety; United States	1:33.45	Fredrik Nordh; Sweden	1:34.28
Combined	François Bourque; Canada	32.84 points	Fredrik Nordh; Sweden	34.12	Lars Elton Myhre; Norway	35.51

=== Women's events ===
Event	Gold		Silver		Bronze	
Downhill	Maria Riesch; Germany	1:12.23	Lindsey Kildow; United States	1:12.45	Daniela Müller; Austria	1:12.85
Super-G	Nadia Fanchini; Italy; Andrea Fischbacher; Austria	1:26.79	Not awarded		Julia Mancuso; United States	1:26.80
Giant Slalom	Maria Riesch; Germany	2:21.39	Jessica Walter; Liechtenstein	2:22.67	Lindsey Kildow; United States	2:22.91
Slalom	Kathrin Zettel; Austria	1:40.73	Nika Fleiss; Croatia	1:40.82	Šárka Záhrobská; Czech Republic	1:41.01
Combined	Julia Mancuso; United States	29.23 points	Kathrin Zettel; Austria	49.97	Šárka Záhrobská; Czech Republic	52.22

- Two gold medals were awarded in the Super-G.
