= Maria Höfl-Riesch =

German alpine skier (born 1984)

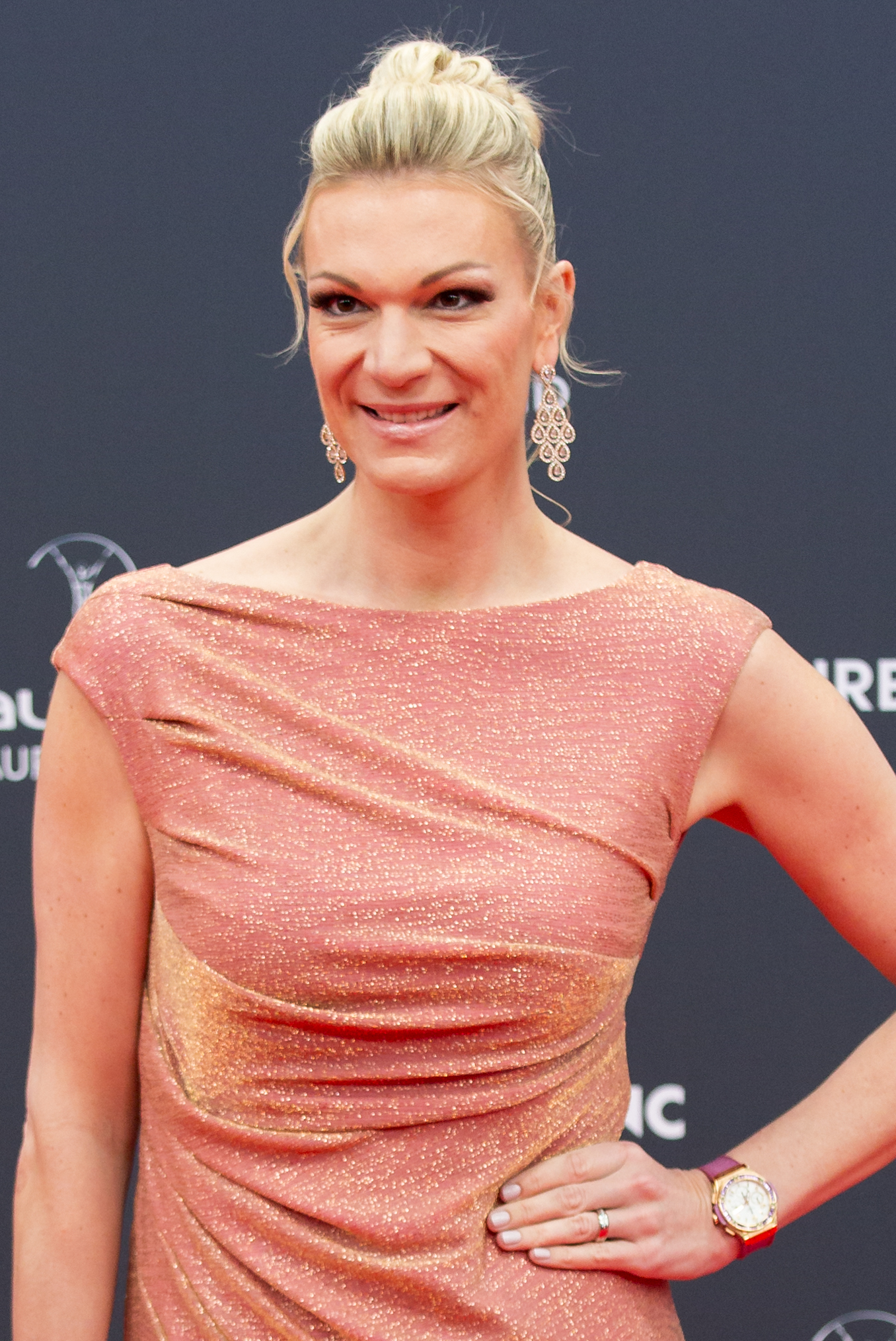
- Riesch at the 25th Laureus World Sports Awards in 2024

Personal information
- Born: 24 November 1984 (age 41) Garmisch-Partenkirchen, Bavaria, West Germany
- Height: 182 cm (6 ft 0 in)
- Website: maria.com.de

Skiing career
- Sport: Alpine skiing
- Club: SC Partenkirchen
- Retired: 20 March 2014 (age 29)
- Disciplines: Downhill), super-G, slalom, combined, giant slalom
- World Cup debut: 16 February 2001 (age 16)

Olympics
- Teams: 2 – (2010, 2014)
- Medals: 4 (3 gold)

World Championships
- Teams: 5 – (2003, 2007–13)
- Medals: 6 (2 gold)

World Cup
- Seasons: 13 – (2002–2014)
- Wins: 27
- Podiums: 81
- Overall titles: 1 – (2011)
- Discipline titles: 5 – (1 DH, 1 SG, 2 SL, 1 SC)
Medal record
Women's alpine skiing
Representing Germany
World Cup race podiums
Event	1st	2nd	3rd
Slalom	9	9	7
Giant slalom	0	2	2
Downhill	11	5	10
Super-G	3	8	5
Combined	4	3	3
Total	27	27	27
International competitions
Event	1st	2nd	3rd
Olympic Games	3	1	0
World Championships	2	0	4
World Junior Championships	5	2	2
Total	10	3	6
Olympic Games
Gold medal – first place	2010 Vancouver	Combined
Gold medal – first place	2010 Vancouver	Slalom
Gold medal – first place	2014 Sochi	Combined
Silver medal – second place	2014 Sochi	Super-G
World Championships
Gold medal – first place	2009 Val d'Isère	Slalom
Gold medal – first place	2013 Schladming	Combined
Bronze medal – third place	2011 Garmisch	Super-G
Bronze medal – third place	2011 Garmisch	Downhill
Bronze medal – third place	2013 Schladming	Downhill
Bronze medal – third place	2013 Schladming	Team event
Junior World Ski Championships
Gold medal – first place	2001 Verbier	Combined
Gold medal – first place	2002 Tarvisio	Super-G
Gold medal – first place	2003 Briançonnais	Combined
Gold medal – first place	2004 Maribor	Downhill
Gold medal – first place	2004 Maribor	Giant slalom
Silver medal – second place	2001 Verbier	Super-G
Silver medal – second place	2002 Tarvisio	Slalom
Bronze medal – third place	2001 Verbier	Downhill
Bronze medal – third place	2003 Briançonnais	Giant slalom

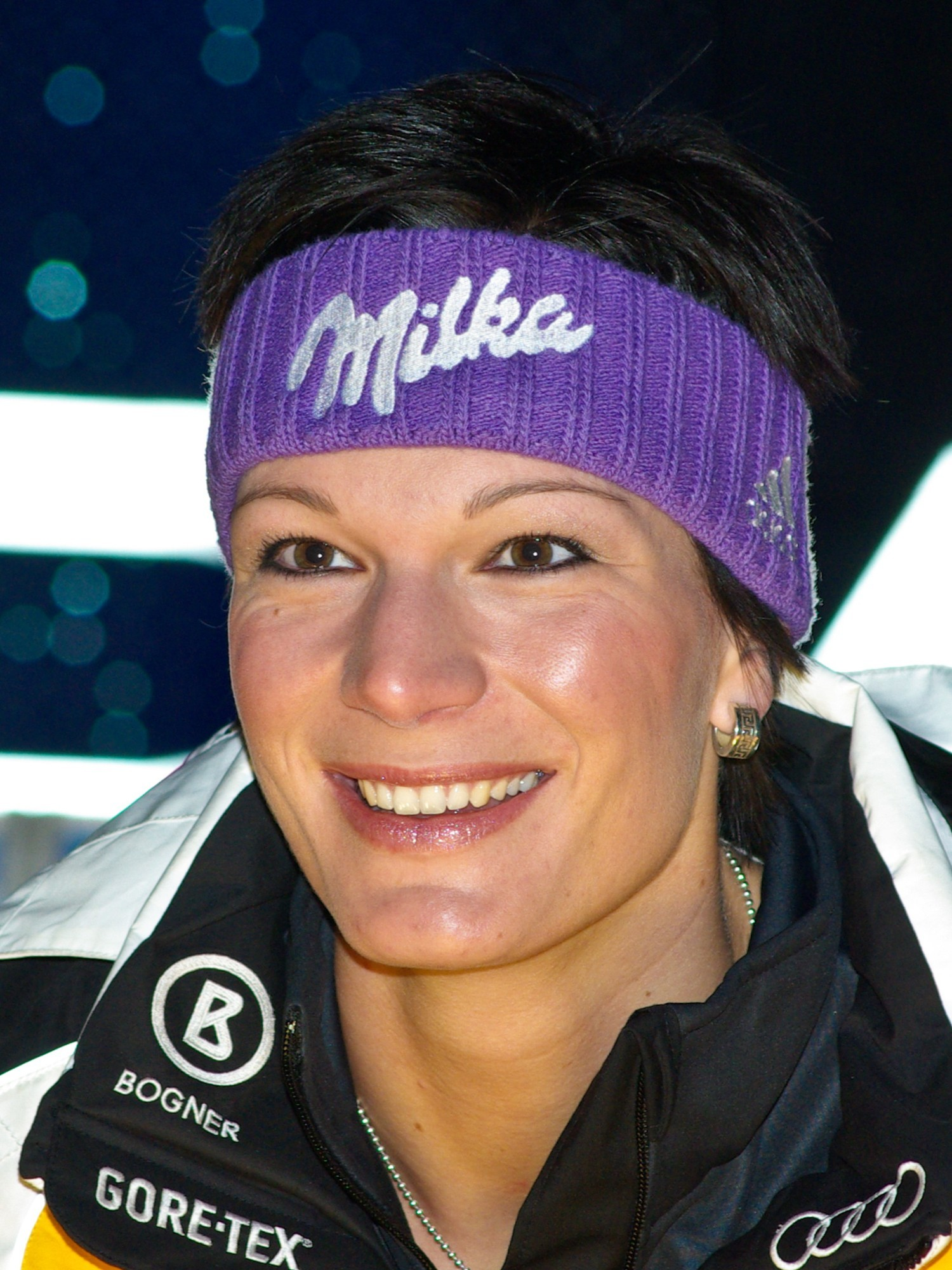
Riesch in January 2009

Maria Höfl-Riesch (German pronunciation: [maˈʁiːa ˌhøːfl̩ ˈʁiːʃ]; née Riesch; born 24 November 1984) is a German former alpine ski racer. She is a three-time Olympic champion, two-time World champion, an overall World Cup champion and five-time World junior champion.

Höfl-Riesch made her World Cup debut in February 2001 and won gold medals in slalom and super combined at the 2010 Winter Olympics. She won the World Cup overall title in 2011. At the 2014 Winter Olympics, she defended her super combined title to win her third Olympic gold medal, and also won a silver medal in the super-G.

== Career ==
Born in Garmisch-Partenkirchen, Höfl-Riesch competed in racing as a junior and won seven medals in all of the disciplines at four Junior World Championships, including three gold medals in combined and super-G.

As the racing careers of Martina Ertl-Renz and Hilde Gerg concluded, Höfl-Riesch rose as the leading female racer on the German national team. Injuries cut short her seasons in 2005 and 2006, causing her to miss the 2005 World Championships and the 2006 Winter Olympics.

During the 2009 season, Höfl-Riesch won four slalom events on the World Cup tour and won the gold medal in the slalom at the World Championships. Prior to 2009, her most successful season was in 2004, when she finished third in the overall World Cup standings, with three race victories. She also finished third in the overall standings in 2008. In the 2007 season she won her second downhill race, at Lake Louise, Canada.

Riesch won two gold medals at the 2010 Winter Olympics, in the super combined and slalom. After finishing second in the overall World Cup standings in 2009 and 2010, Riesch built a big lead early in the 2011 season which was enough to win the overall title, besting three-time defending champion Lindsey Vonn of the U.S. by just three points. At the World Cup finals in Lenzerheide, Vonn took the overall lead after the downhill, then Riesch reclaimed it after the slalom; the super-G and giant slalom races were cancelled due to poor conditions. She retired after the 2014 season after crashing in the downhill World Cup Final.

== Personal ==
Höfl-Riesch is also a nationally ranked tennis player and a cyclist. Her younger sister, Susanne Riesch, is also a former World Cup ski racer, specializing in the slalom. Her uncle, Wolfgang Zimmerer was a bobsledder during the 1960s and 1970s and competed for West Germany in the Winter Olympics, winning gold with Peter Utzschneider at the Two-man bobsleigh during the 1972 Winter Olympics. She has been a chief constable in the Bundeszollverwaltung (German Federal Customs Service) during her sports career.

One of her closest friends (and major rival) on the World Cup tour was Lindsey Vonn of the United States.

Höfl-Riesch married her manager Marcus Höfl on 14 April 2011.

At a height of 1.82 m (5 ft 11 1/2 in), she was one of the tallest women on the World Cup circuit.

== World Cup results ==
=== Season titles ===
- 6 titles – (1 overall, 1 downhill, 1 super-G, 2 slalom, 1 combined)

Season	Discipline
2008	Super-G
2008	Combined
2009	Slalom
2010	Slalom
2011	Overall
2014	Downhill

=== Season standings ===
Season	Age	Overall	Slalom	Giant slalom	Super-G	Downhill	Combined
2001	16	109	–	–	42	—	—
2002	17	96	46	50	—	—	—
2003	18	32	40	42	37	14	3
2004	19	3	9	18	5	7	—
2005	20	43	44	32	26	27	—
2006	21	69	–	49	35	44	—
2007	22	14	25	22	18	7	36
2008	23	3	8	25	1	9	1
2009	24	2	1	15	10	3	4
2010	25	2	1	8	9	2	5
2011	26	1	3	8	2	2	3
2012	27	3	7	16	6	4	4
2013	28	2	9	6	5	3	9
2014	29	2	5	14	5	1	3

=== Race victories ===
- 27 wins – (11 DH, 3 SG, 9 SL, 4 SC) + 1 NTE

Season	Date	Location	Discipline
2004; 3 victories (1 DH, 1 SG, 1 SL)	30 Jan 2004	Haus im Ennstal, Austria	Downhill
2004; 3 victories (1 DH, 1 SG, 1 SL)	1 Feb 2004	Haus im Ennstal, Austria	Super-G
2004; 3 victories (1 DH, 1 SG, 1 SL)	29 Feb 2004	Levi, Finland	Slalom
2007	1 Dec 2006	Lake Louise, Canada	Downhill
2008 (1 SG, 1 SC)	21 Jan 2008	Cortina d'Ampezzo, Italy	Super-G
2008 (1 SG, 1 SC)	24 Feb 2008	Whistler, Canada	Super combined
2009; 5 victories (4 SL, 1 SC)	14 Dec 2008	La Molina, Spain	Slalom
2009; 5 victories (4 SL, 1 SC)	29 Dec 2008	Semmering, Austria	Slalom
2009; 5 victories (4 SL, 1 SC)	4 Jan 2009	Zagreb, Croatia	Slalom
2009; 5 victories (4 SL, 1 SC)	11 Jan 2009	Maribor, Slovenia	Slalom
2009; 5 victories (4 SL, 1 SC)	20 Feb 2009	Tarvisio, Italy	Super combined
2010; 3 victories (1 SL, 2 DH)	14 Nov 2009	Levi, Finland	Slalom
2010; 3 victories (1 SL, 2 DH)	30 Jan 2010	St. Moritz, Switzerland	Downhill
2010; 3 victories (1 SL, 2 DH)	10 Mar 2010	Garmisch, Germany	Downhill
2011; 7 victories (3 DH, 1 SL, 1 SC, 1 SG, 1 NTE)	3 Dec 2010	Lake Louise, Canada	Downhill
2011; 7 victories (3 DH, 1 SL, 1 SC, 1 SG, 1 NTE)	4 Dec 2010	Lake Louise, Canada	Downhill
2011; 7 victories (3 DH, 1 SL, 1 SC, 1 SG, 1 NTE)	11 Jan 2011	Flachau, Austria	Slalom
2011; 7 victories (3 DH, 1 SL, 1 SC, 1 SG, 1 NTE)	22 Jan 2011	Cortina d'Ampezzo, Italy	Downhill
2011; 7 victories (3 DH, 1 SL, 1 SC, 1 SG, 1 NTE)	25 Feb 2011	Åre, Sweden	Super combined
2011; 7 victories (3 DH, 1 SL, 1 SC, 1 SG, 1 NTE)	27 Feb 2011	Åre, Sweden	Super-G
2011; 7 victories (3 DH, 1 SL, 1 SC, 1 SG, 1 NTE)	20 Mar 2011	Lenzerheide, Switzerland	Team event
2012; 3 victories (1 DH, 1 SL, 1 SC)	29 Jan 2012	St. Moritz, Switzerland	Super combined
2012; 3 victories (1 DH, 1 SL, 1 SC)	18 Feb 2012	Sochi, Russia	Downhill
2012; 3 victories (1 DH, 1 SL, 1 SC)	10 Mar 2012	Åre, Sweden	Slalom
2013	10 Nov 2012	Levi, Finland	Slalom
2014; 3 victories (3 DH)	6 Dec 2013	Lake Louise, Canada	Downhill
2014; 3 victories (3 DH)	7 Dec 2013	Lake Louise, Canada	Downhill
2014; 3 victories (3 DH)	24 Jan 2014	Cortina d'Ampezzo, Italy	Downhill

== World Championship results ==
Year	Age	Slalom	Giant slalom	Super-G	Downhill	Combined
2003	18	DNF1	DNF1	DNF	17	5
2005	20	injured, did not compete				
2007	22	—	23	10	9	7
2009	24	1	28	8	10	4
2011	26	4	DNF2	3	3	11
2013	28	DNF2	9	DNF	3	1

== Olympic results ==
Year	Age	Slalom	Giant slalom	Super-G	Downhill	Combined
2006	21	injured, did not compete				
2010	25	1	10	8	8	1
2014	29	4	DNS1	2	13	1

== See also ==
- List of FIS Alpine Ski World Cup women's race winners

Awards
Preceded by Steffi Nerius; Christina Obergföll	German Sportswoman of the Year; 2010; 2014	Succeeded by Magdalena Neuner; Christina Schwanitz
Olympic Games
Preceded by André Lange	Flagbearer for Germany; Sochi 2014	Succeeded by Eric Frenzel
