= Silvano Varettoni =

Italian alpine skier

Personal information
- Born: 3 December 1984 (age 41) Pieve di Cadore, Italy

Skiing career
- Sport: Alpine skiing
- Retired: 2016
- Disciplines: Spoeed events
- World Cup debut: 2006

World Cup
- Seasons: 11
- Wins: 0
- Podiums: 0
Medal record
World Junior Championships
Silver medal – second place	Maribor 2004	Downhill

Silvano Varettoni (born 3 December 1984) is a former Italian World Cup alpine ski racer.

== World Cup results ==
Top 10

Date	Place	Discipline	Position
28-02-2015	(Germany) Garmisch-Partenkirchen	Downhill	4
28-02-2014	(Norway) Kvitfjell	Downhill	9
29-12-2013	(Italy) Bormio	Downhill	9
02-03-2013	(Norway) Kvitfjell	Downhill	5
15-12-2012	(Italy) Val Gardena	Downhill	9
