= Alpine skiing at the 2014 Winter Olympics – Women's combined =

Women's combined at the XXII Olympic Winter Games
- Alpine skiing pictogram
- Venue: Rosa Khutor Alpine Resort
- Date: 10 February 2014
- Competitors: 36 from 20 nations
- Winning time: 2:34.62

Medalists
1st place, gold medalist(s)		Maria Höfl-Riesch	Germany
2nd place, silver medalist(s)		Nicole Hosp	Austria
3rd place, bronze medalist(s)		Julia Mancuso	United States

The women's combined competition of the Sochi 2014 Olympics was held at the Rosa Khutor Alpine Resort near Krasnaya Polyana, Russia, on 10 February at 11:00 MSK for the downhill and at 15:00 MSK for the slalom. Maria Höfl-Riesch won the gold medal.

== Results ==
The downhill race started at 11:00 and the slalom race at 15:00.

Rank	Bib	Name	Nation	Downhill	Rank	Slalom	Rank	Total	Behind
1st place, gold medalist(s)	20	Maria Höfl-Riesch	Germany	1:43.72	5	50.90	3	2:34.62	—
2nd place, silver medalist(s)	16	Nicole Hosp	Austria	1:43.95	8	51.07	4	2:35.02	+0.40
3rd place, bronze medalist(s)	22	Julia Mancuso	United States	1:42.68	1	52.47	13	2:35.15	+0.53
4	17	Tina Maze	Slovenia	1:43.54	3	51.71	7	2:35.25	+0.63
5	8	Dominique Gisin	Switzerland	1:44.01	10	52.11	11	2:36.12	+1.50
6	9	Ragnhild Mowinckel	Norway	1:44.28	12	51.87	8	2:36.15	+1.53
7	18	Michaela Kirchgasser	Austria	1:45.72	23	50.69	2	2:36.41	+1.79
8	11	Anna Fenninger	Austria	1:43.67	4	52.77	14	2:36.44	+1.82
9	23	Šárka Strachová	Czech Republic	1:46.51	25	50.10	1	2:36.61	+1.99
10	13	Maruša Ferk	Slovenia	1:44.87	17	52.02	10	2:36.89	+2.27
11	25	Federica Brignone	Italy	1:45.68	22	51.94	9	2:37.62	+3.00
12	12	Denise Feierabend	Switzerland	1:46.03	24	51.68	6	2:37.71	+3.09
13	15	Sara Hector	Sweden	1:46.54	26	51.31	5	2:37.85	+3.23
14	4	Elena Yakovishina	Russia	1:44.91	19	53.97	16	2:38.88	+4.26
15	35	Greta Small	Australia	1:47.99	29	52.31	12	2:40.30	+5.68
16	36	Edit Miklós	Hungary	1:44.32	13	57.29	19	2:41.61	+6.99
17	32	Karolina Chrapek	Poland	1:47.28	28	54.52	17	2:41.80	+7.18
18	31	Mireia Gutiérrez	Andorra	1:49.04	32	53.26	15	2:42.30	+7.68
19	33	Klára Křížová	Czech Republic	1:44.89	18	57.51	20	2:42.40	+7.78
20	24	Macarena Simari Birkner	Argentina	1:48.87	31	55.06	18	2:43.93	+9.31
21	34	Anna Berecz	Hungary	1:50.28	33	58.41	21	2:48.69	+14.07
22	39	Ania Monica Caill	Romania	1:51.91	34	1:02.04	22	2:53.95	+19.33
	2	Daniela Merighetti	Italy	1:44.64	15	DNS			
	5	Chemmy Alcott	Great Britain	1:44.83	16	DNS			
	29	Elena Fanchini	Italy	1:44.45	14	DNS			
	1	Francesca Marsaglia	Italy	1:43.96	9	DNF			
	7	Lotte Smiseth Sejersted	Norway	1:43.85	6	DNF			
	10	Lara Gut	Switzerland	1:43.15	2	DNF			
	19	Elisabeth Görgl	Austria	1:43.89	7	DNF			
	21	Marie-Michèle Gagnon	Canada	1:45.39	21	DNF			
	26	Jana Gantnerová	Slovakia	1:47.24	27	DNF			
	27	Leanne Smith	United States	1:45.06	20	DNF			
	28	Ilka Štuhec	Slovenia	1:44.26	11	DNF			
	37	Kristína Saalová	Slovakia	1:48.21	30	DNF			
	3	Marianne Kaufmann-Abderhalden	Switzerland	DNF					
	6	Noelle Barahona	Chile	DNF					
	14	Laurenne Ross	United States	DNF					
	30	Stacey Cook	United States	DNF					
	38	Alexandra Coletti	Monaco	DNF					
