= Slovakia at the 2014 Winter Olympics =

- IOC code: SVK
- NOC: Slovak Olympic and Sports Committee
- Website: www.olympic.sk (in Slovak)

in Sochi
- Competitors: 63 in 9 sports
- Flag bearers: Zdeno Chára (opening); Anastasiya Kuzmina (closing)
- Medals Ranked 21st: Gold 1 Silver 0 Bronze 0 Total 1

Winter Olympics appearances (overview)
- 1994; 1998; 2002; 2006; 2010; 2014; 2018; 2022; 2026

Other related appearances
- Czechoslovakia (1924–1992)

Slovakia competed at the 2014 Winter Olympics in Sochi, Russia, from 7 to 23 February 2014. The team consisted of 63 athletes in 9 sports.

== Medalists ==
Medal	Name	Sport	Event	Date
Gold	Anastasiya Kuzmina	Biathlon	Women's sprint	February 9

== Alpine skiing ==
According to the quota allocation released on 27 January 2014, Slovakia qualified a total of nine athletes in alpine skiing.

Men

Athlete	Event	Run 1		Run 2		Total	
Athlete	Event	Time	Rank	Time	Rank	Time	Rank
Martin Bendík	Downhill	—N/a				2:15.39	45
Martin Bendík	Super-G	—N/a				1:23.06	43
Martin Bendík	Combined	DNF					
Matej Falat	Super-G	—N/a				1:22.81	42
Matej Falat	Combined	DNF					
Matej Falat	Slalom	DNF					
Adam Žampa	Super-G	—N/a				1:20.95	28
Adam Žampa	Combined	1:56.23	27	50.11	1	2:46.34	5
Adam Žampa	Giant slalom	1:23.13	20	1:25.28	26	2:48.41	22
Adam Žampa	Slalom	49.34	26	53.94	1	1:43.28	6
Andreas Žampa	Super-G	—N/a				1:22.42	36
Andreas Žampa	Giant slalom	1:25.54	36	1:26.08	32	2:51.62	32
Andreas Žampa	Slalom	58.65	67	DNF			

Women

Athlete	Event	Run 1		Run 2		Total	
Athlete	Event	Time	Rank	Time	Rank	Time	Rank
Jana Gantnerová	Combined	1:47.24	27	DNF			
Jana Gantnerová	Slalom	59.26	=31	DNF			
Barbara Kantorová	Super-G	—N/a				1:28.91	22
Barbara Kantorová	Giant slalom	1:24.72	43	1:23.09	36	2:47.81	38
Barbara Kantorová	Slalom	DNF					
Barbora Lukáčová	Slalom	DNF					
Barbora Lukáčová	Giant slalom	1:25.59	49	1:25.07	44	2:50.66	45
Kristína Saalová	Downhill	—N/a				1:45.98	31
Kristína Saalová	Super-G	—N/a				DNF	
Kristína Saalová	Combined	1:48.21	30	DNF			
Kristína Saalová	Giant slalom	DNF					
Petra Vlhová	Slalom	56.42	18	53.74	23	1:50.16	19
Petra Vlhová	Giant slalom	1:21.86	27	1:19.83	23	2:41.69	24

== Biathlon ==
Based on their performance at the 2012 and 2013 Biathlon World Championships, Slovakia qualified 5 men and 5 women.

Men

Athlete	Event	Time	Misses	Rank
Tomáš Hasilla	Sprint	27:05.4	3 (2+1)	65
Tomáš Hasilla	Individual	54:16.9	2 (1+1+0+0)	43
Pavol Hurajt	Sprint	26:45.8	0 (0+0)	52
Pavol Hurajt	Pursuit	39:14.3	1 (1+0+0+0)	52
Pavol Hurajt	Individual	52:53.3	1 (0+1+0+0)	28
Matej Kazár	Sprint	26:04.8	3 (2+1)	37
Matej Kazár	Pursuit	35:38.4	3 (1+0+1+1)	23
Matej Kazár	Individual	51:56.9	2 (1+0+1+0)	19
Matej Kazár	Mass start	44:25.6	2 (0+1+1+0)	15
Miroslav Matiaško	Individual	55:58.7	4 (1+1+0+2)	58
Martin Otčenáš	Sprint	27:07.8	3 (1+2)	68
Tomáš Hasilla; Pavol Hurajt; Matej Kazár; Miroslav Matiaško	Team relay	1:15:23.8	10 (1+9)	12

Women

Athlete	Event	Time	Misses	Rank
Martina Chrapánová	Sprint	23:48.3	2 (0+2)	62
Martina Chrapánová	Individual	52:00.5	5 (0+0+1+2)	59
Paulína Fialková	Sprint	24:27.1	5 (3+2)	72
Jana Gereková	Sprint	22:58.0	3 (1+2)	43
Jana Gereková	Pursuit	32:57.7	4 (2+0+0+2)	35
Jana Gereková	Individual	50:20.8	5 (0+1+1+3)	50
Anastasiya Kuzmina	Sprint	21:06.8	0 (0+0)	1st place, gold medalist(s)
Anastasiya Kuzmina	Pursuit	30:29.1	2 (0+1+0+1)	6
Anastasiya Kuzmina	Individual	48:14.1	4 (0+1+0+3)	27
Anastasiya Kuzmina	Mass start	38:50.3	5 (0+2+2+1)	26
Terézia Poliaková	Individual	53:19.8	6 (0+3+1+2)	66
Martina Chrapánová; Paulína Fialková; Jana Gereková; Terézia Poliaková	Team relay	LAP	24 (5+19)	14

Mixed

Athlete	Event	Time	Misses	Rank
Jana Gereková; Pavol Hurajt; Matej Kazár; Anastasiya Kuzmina	Team relay	1:11:04.7	10 (0+10)	5

== Bobsleigh ==
Athlete	Event	Run 1		Run 2		Run 3		Run 4		Total	
Athlete	Event	Time	Rank	Time	Rank	Time	Rank	Time	Rank	Time	Rank
Milan Jagnešák*; Lukáš Kozienka; Juraj Mokráš; Martin Tešovič	Four-man	56.56	27	56.37	25	56.51	26	Did not advance		2:49.44	25

* – Denotes the driver of each sled

== Cross-country skiing ==
Slovakia qualified for the following events according to the quota allocation by the International Ski Federation (FIS).

Distance

Athlete	Event	Classical		Freestyle		Final		
Athlete	Event	Time	Rank	Time	Rank	Time	Deficit	Rank
Martin Bajčičák	Men's 15 km classical	—N/a				40:28.0	+1:58.3	23
Martin Bajčičák	Men's 30 km skiathlon	37:21.7	40	33:07.3	28	1:11:00.1	+2:44.7	31
Martin Bajčičák	Men's 50 km freestyle	—N/a				1:47:34.4	+39.2	14
Peter Mlynár	Men's 15 km classical	—N/a				42:50.3	+4:20.6	51
Alena Procházková	Women's 10 km classical	—N/a				32:08.4	+3:50.6	47

Sprint

Athlete	Event	Qualification		Quarterfinal		Semifinal		Final	
Athlete	Event	Time	Rank	Time	Rank	Time	Rank	Time	Rank
Peter Mlynár	Men's sprint	3:51.76	66	Did not advance					
Martin Bajčičák; Peter Mlynár	Men's team sprint	—N/a				24:58.06	9	Did not advance	
Daniela Kotschová	Women's sprint	2:49.81	55	Did not advance					
Alena Procházková	Women's sprint	2:41.95	39	Did not advance					
Daniela Kotschová; Alena Procházková	Women's team sprint	—N/a				18:51.94	7	Did not advance	

== Figure skating ==
Slovakia achieved the following quota places:

Athlete	Event	SP		FS		Total	
Athlete	Event	Points	Rank	Points	Rank	Points	Rank
Nicole Rajičová	Ladies' singles	49.80	21 Q	75.20	24	125.00	24

== Freestyle skiing ==
Slopestyle

Athlete	Event	Qualification				Final			
Athlete	Event	Run 1	Run 2	Best	Rank	Run 1	Run 2	Best	Rank
Natália Šlepecká	Women's slopestyle	34.60	32.60	34.60	18	Did not advance			
Zuzana Stromková	Women's slopestyle	24.40	20.20	24.40	20	Did not advance			

== Ice hockey ==
Slovakia qualified a men's team by being one of the 9 highest ranked teams in the IIHF World Ranking following the 2012 World Championships.

=== Men's tournament ===
Roster

The following is the Slovak roster in the men's ice hockey tournament of the 2014 Winter Olympics.

No.	Pos.	Name	Height	Weight	Birthdate	Birthplace	2013–14 team
7	D	Ivan Baranka	191 cm (6 ft 3 in)	91 kg (201 lb)	19 May 1985	Ilava	(Russia) Avangard Omsk (KHL)
13	F	Tomáš Jurčo	188 cm (6 ft 2 in)	88 kg (194 lb)	28 December 1992	Košice	(United States) Detroit Red Wings (NHL)
14	D	Andrej Meszároš	188 cm (6 ft 2 in)	100 kg (220 lb)	13 October 1985	Považská Bystrica	(United States) Philadelphia Flyers (NHL)
19	D	Tomáš Starosta	183 cm (6 ft 0 in)	90 kg (200 lb)	20 May 1981	Trenčín	(Russia) Yugra Khanty-Mansiysk (KHL)
23	D	René Vydarený	186 cm (6 ft 1 in)	92 kg (203 lb)	6 May 1981	Bratislava	(Czech Republic) Hradec Králové (CZE)
26	F	Michal Handzuš – A	196 cm (6 ft 5 in)	98 kg (216 lb)	11 March 1977	Banská Bystrica	(United States) Chicago Blackhawks (NHL)
28	F	Richard Pánik	187 cm (6 ft 2 in)	94 kg (207 lb)	7 February 1991	Martin	(United States) Tampa Bay Lightning (NHL)
31	G	Peter Budaj	185 cm (6 ft 1 in)	87 kg (192 lb)	18 September 1982	Banská Bystrica	(Canada) Montreal Canadiens (NHL)
33	D	Zdeno Chára – C	206 cm (6 ft 9 in)	116 kg (256 lb)	18 March 1977	Trenčín	(United States) Boston Bruins (NHL)
41	G	Jaroslav Halák	179 cm (5 ft 10 in)	84 kg (185 lb)	13 May 1985	Bratislava	(United States) St. Louis Blues (NHL)
43	F	Tomáš Surový	186 cm (6 ft 1 in)	98 kg (216 lb)	24 September 1981	Banská Bystrica	(Belarus) Dinamo Minsk (KHL)
44	D	Andrej Sekera	183 cm (6 ft 0 in)	91 kg (201 lb)	8 June 1986	Bojnice	(United States) Carolina Hurricanes (NHL)
50	G	Ján Laco	180 cm (5 ft 11 in)	83 kg (183 lb)	1 December 1981	Liptovský Mikuláš	(Ukraine) Donbass Donetsk (KHL)
52	D	Martin Marinčin	193 cm (6 ft 4 in)	85 kg (187 lb)	18 February 1992	Košice	(Canada) Edmonton Oilers (NHL)
61	F	Milan Bartovič	182 cm (6 ft 0 in)	88 kg (194 lb)	9 April 1981	Trenčín	(Slovakia) Slovan Bratislava (KHL)
65	F	Tomáš Marcinko	193 cm (6 ft 4 in)	94 kg (207 lb)	11 April 1988	Poprad	(Slovakia) HC Košice (SVK)
67	F	Tomáš Záborský	181 cm (5 ft 11 in)	91 kg (201 lb)	14 November 1987	Trenčín	(Russia) Salavat Yulaev Ufa (KHL)
68	D	Milan Jurčina	193 cm (6 ft 4 in)	114 kg (251 lb)	7 June 1983	Liptovský Mikuláš	(Finland) TPS Turku (FIN)
81	F	Marián Hossa – A	187 cm (6 ft 2 in)	95 kg (209 lb)	12 January 1979	Stará Ľubovňa	(United States) Chicago Blackhawks (NHL)
82	F	Tomáš Kopecký	190 cm (6 ft 3 in)	92 kg (203 lb)	5 February 1982	Ilava	(United States) Florida Panthers (NHL)
85	F	Peter Ölvecký	188 cm (6 ft 2 in)	97 kg (214 lb)	11 October 1985	Nové Zámky	(Slovakia) Slovan Bratislava (KHL)
88	F	Marcel Hossa	187 cm (6 ft 2 in)	99 kg (218 lb)	12 October 1981	Ilava	(Latvia) Dinamo Riga (KHL)
90	F	Tomáš Tatar	178 cm (5 ft 10 in)	84 kg (185 lb)	1 December 1990	Ilava	(United States) Detroit Red Wings (NHL)
91	F	Michel Miklík	184 cm (6 ft 0 in)	90 kg (200 lb)	31 July 1982	Piešťany	(Slovakia) Slovan Bratislava (KHL)
92	F	Branko Radivojevič	187 cm (6 ft 2 in)	93 kg (205 lb)	24 November 1980	Piešťany	(Slovakia) Slovan Bratislava (KHL)

Forward Marián Gáborík was also selected but was unable to play due to injury.

Group stage

Team	Pld	W	OTW	OTL	L	GF	GA	GD	Pts	Qualification
United States	3	2	1	0	0	15	4	+11	8	Quarterfinals
Russia	3	1	1	1	0	8	5	+3	6	
Slovenia	3	1	0	0	2	6	11	−5	3	
Slovakia	3	0	0	1	2	2	11	−9	1	

Source: IIHF

13 February 2014; 16:30	Slovakia	1–7 (0–1, 1–6, 0–0)	United States	Shayba Arena, Sochi; Attendance: 4,119

Game reference

Jaroslav Halák (out 33:30)
Peter Budaj (in 33:30)
Goalies
Jonathan Quick
Referees:
(Czech Republic) Antonín Jeřábek
(Canada) Kevin Pollock
Linesmen:
(Canada) Mark Wheler
(Canada) Jesse Wilmot

	0–1	14:27 – J. Carlson (P. Kessel, J. van Riemsdyk)
T. Tatar (Mari. Hossa) – 20:24	1–1
	1–2	21:26 – R. Kesler (P. Kane)
	1–3	22:32 – P. Stastny (M. Pacioretty, T. Oshie)
	1–4	28:16 – D. Backes (P. Kessel)
	1–5	33:30 – P. Stastny (K. Shattenkirk, T. Oshie)
	1–6	34:20 – P. Kessel (R. Kesler, J. van Riemsdyk)
	1–7	35:17 – D. Brown (J. Carlson, P. Kane)

4 min
Penalties
2 min
23
Shots
33

15 February 2014; 12:00	Slovakia	1–3 (0–0, 0–0, 1–3)	Slovenia	Bolshoy Ice Dome, Sochi; Attendance: 7,438

Game reference

Jaroslav Halák
Goalies
Robert Kristan
Referees:
(Russia) Konstantin Olenin
(United States) Tim Peel
Linesmen:
(Canada) Derek Amell
(Belarus) Ivan Dedioulia

	0–1	43:23 – R. Tičar (Ž. Jeglič, R. Sabolič) (PP)
	0–2	48:59 – T. Razingar (J. Urbas, M. Rodman)
	0–3	49:22 – A. Kopitar (J. Muršak)
T. Jurčo (T. Záborský, Z. Chára) (PP) – 59:42	1–3

8 min
Penalties
10 min
28
Shots
31

16 February 2014; 16:30	Russia	1–0 (SO) (0–0, 0–0, 0–0, 0–0, 1–0)	Slovakia	Bolshoy Ice Dome, Sochi; Attendance: 11,097

Game reference
Semyon Varlamov	Goalies	Ján Laco	Referees: (Germany) Lars Brüggemann (Canada) Kelly Sutherland; Linesmen: (Canada) Chris Carlson (United States) Andy McElman
A. Radulov; I. Kovalchuk	Shootout	(miss) M. Handzuš; (miss) T. Tatar	Referees: (Germany) Lars Brüggemann (Canada) Kelly Sutherland; Linesmen: (Canada) Chris Carlson (United States) Andy McElman
4 min	Penalties	10 min	Referees: (Germany) Lars Brüggemann (Canada) Kelly Sutherland; Linesmen: (Canada) Chris Carlson (United States) Andy McElman
37	Shots	27	Referees: (Germany) Lars Brüggemann (Canada) Kelly Sutherland; Linesmen: (Canada) Chris Carlson (United States) Andy McElman

Qualification Play-offs

18 February 2014; 21:00	Czech Republic	5–3 (3–0, 1–1, 1–2)	Slovakia	Shayba Arena, Sochi; Attendance: 3,628

Game reference

Ondřej Pavelec
Goalies
Ján Laco
Referees:
(United States) Tim Peel
(Sweden) Marcus Vinnerborg
Linesmen:
(Canada) Lonnie Cameron
(Finland) Sakari Suominen

A. Hemský (T. Kaberle, J. Voráček) (PP) – 6:53	1–0
R. Červenka (J. Jágr, T. Plekanec) – 7:22	2–0
D. Krejčí (T. Kaberle) (PP) – 17:03	3–0
R. Červenka – 35:41	4–0
	4–1	38:57 – Mari. Hossa (A. Sekera, M. Handzuš)
	4–2	47:20 – Mari. Hossa (T. Tatar, M. Handzuš)
	4–3	48:51 – T. Surový (A. Sekera, M. Bartovič)
T. Plekanec (D. Krejčí, M. Židlický) (PP) (EN) – 59:21	5–3

2 min
Penalties
10 min
29
Shots
32

== Luge ==
Slovakia qualified a total of six athletes, and a spot in the team relay.

Athlete	Event	Run 1		Run 2		Run 3		Run 4		Total	
Athlete	Event	Time	Rank	Time	Rank	Time	Rank	Time	Rank	Time	Rank
Jozef Ninis	Men's singles	53.143	22	52.932	21	52.492	20	52.564	21	3:31.131	20
Jozef Petrulák; Marián Zemaník	Men's doubles	50.548	13	50.409	12	—N/a				1:40.957	12
Marek Solčanský; Karol Stuchlák	Men's doubles	50.904	16	51.481	18	—N/a				1:42.385	16
Viera Gburova	Women's singles	51.928	27	51.422	23	51.782	25	51.565	23	3:26.697	23
Viera Gburova; Jozef Ninis; Jozef Petrulák; Marián Zemaník	Mixed team relay	55.757	11	56.472	8	57.936	9	—N/a		2:50.165	10

== Short track speed skating ==
Women

Athlete	Event	Heat		Semifinal		Final	
Athlete	Event	Time	Rank	Time	Rank	Time	Rank
Tatiana Bodova	1500 m	2:31.788	5	Did not advance			29
