= Alpine skiing at the 2014 Winter Olympics – Women's downhill =

Women's downhill at the XXII Olympic Winter Games
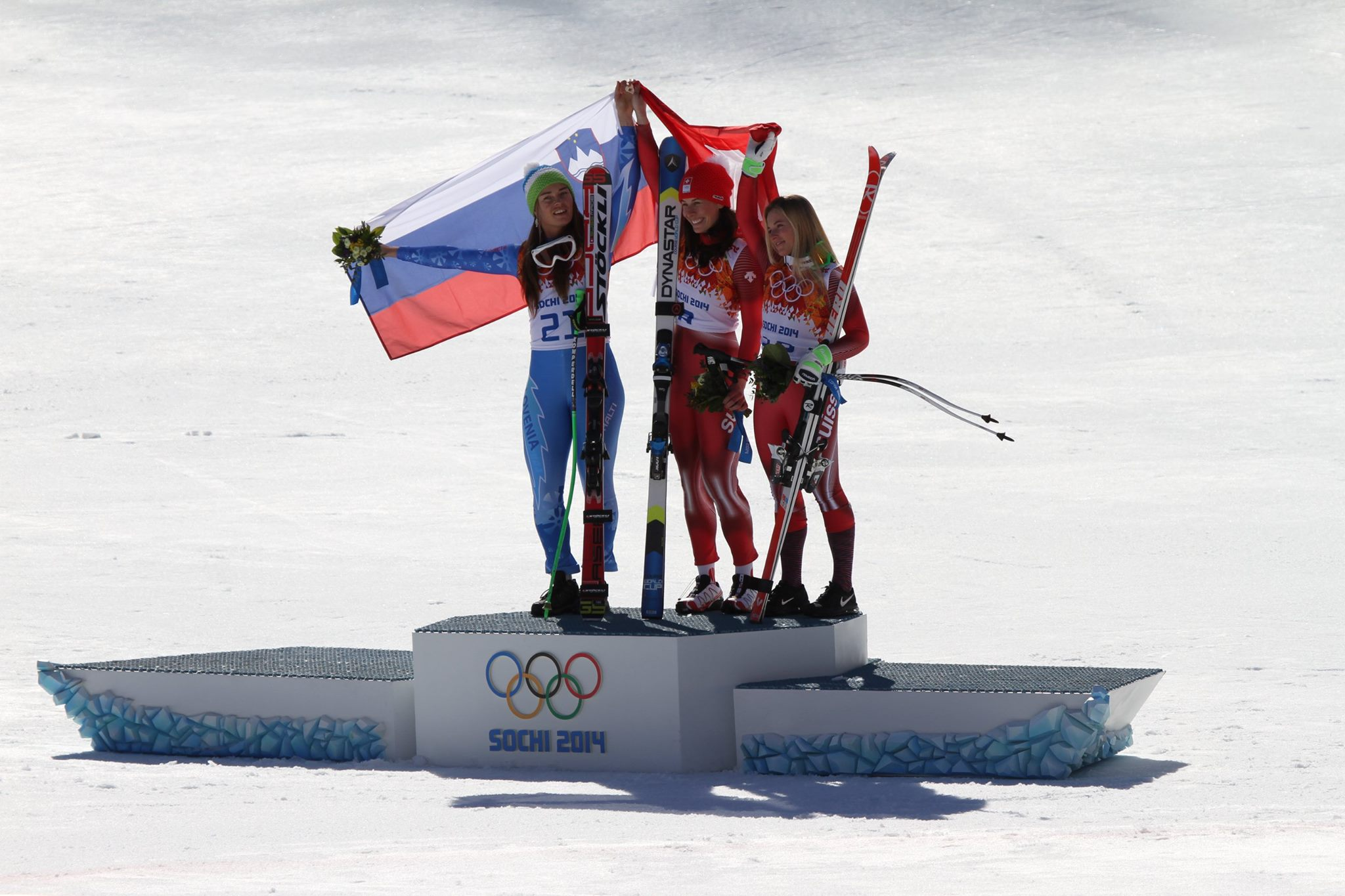
- Maze, Gisin, and Gut on the podium
- Venue: Rosa Khutor Alpine Resort; Krasnaya Polyana, Russia
- Date: 12 February
- Competitors: 41 from 23 nations
- Winning time: 1:41.57

Medalists
1st place, gold medalist(s)		Tina Maze	Slovenia
1st place, gold medalist(s)		Dominique Gisin	Switzerland
3rd place, bronze medalist(s)		Lara Gut	Switzerland

Women's Downhill
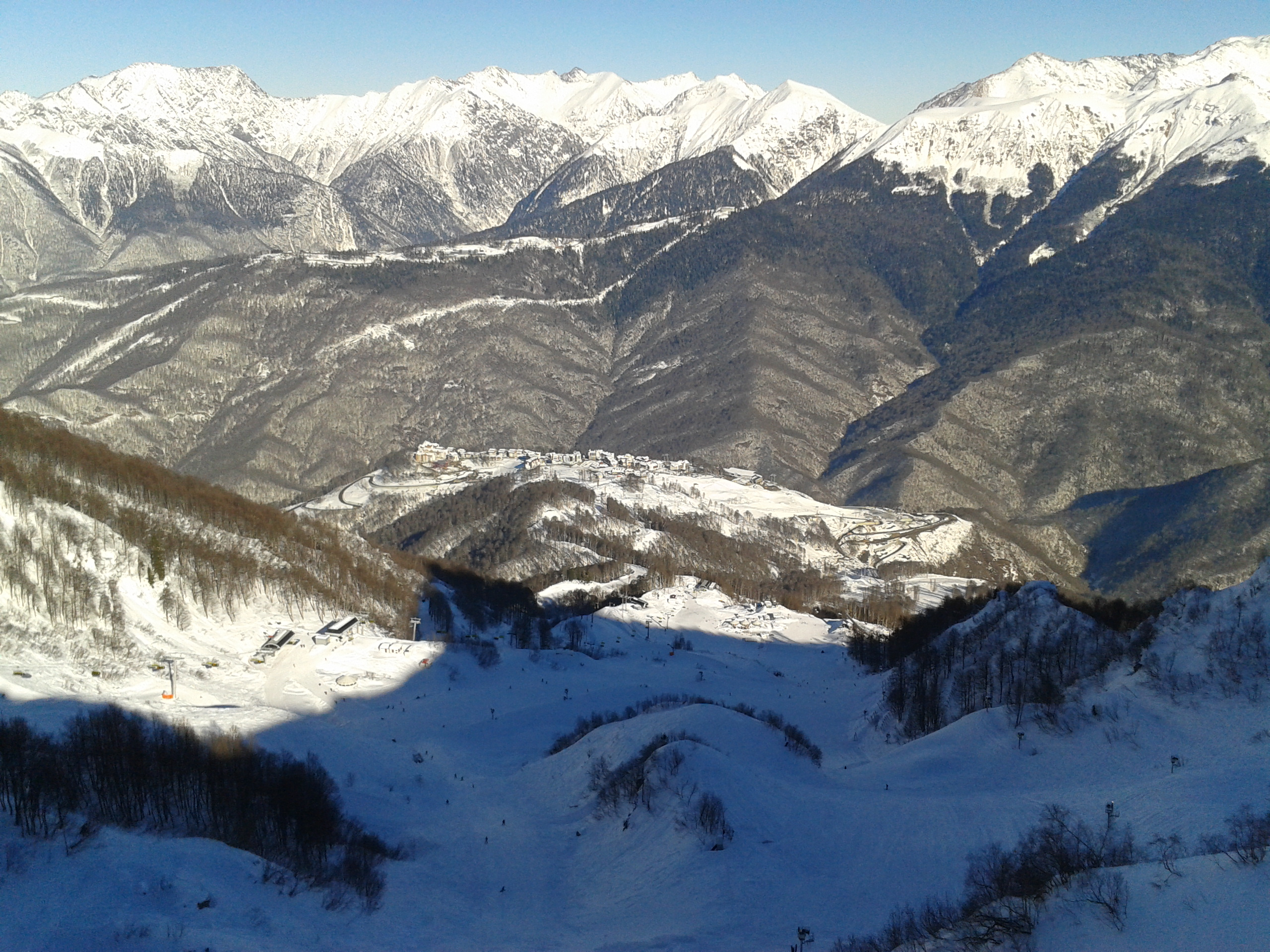
- Location: Rosa Khutor
- Vertical: 790 m (2,592 ft)
- Top elevation: 1,755 m (5,758 ft)
- Base elevation: 965 m (3,166 ft)

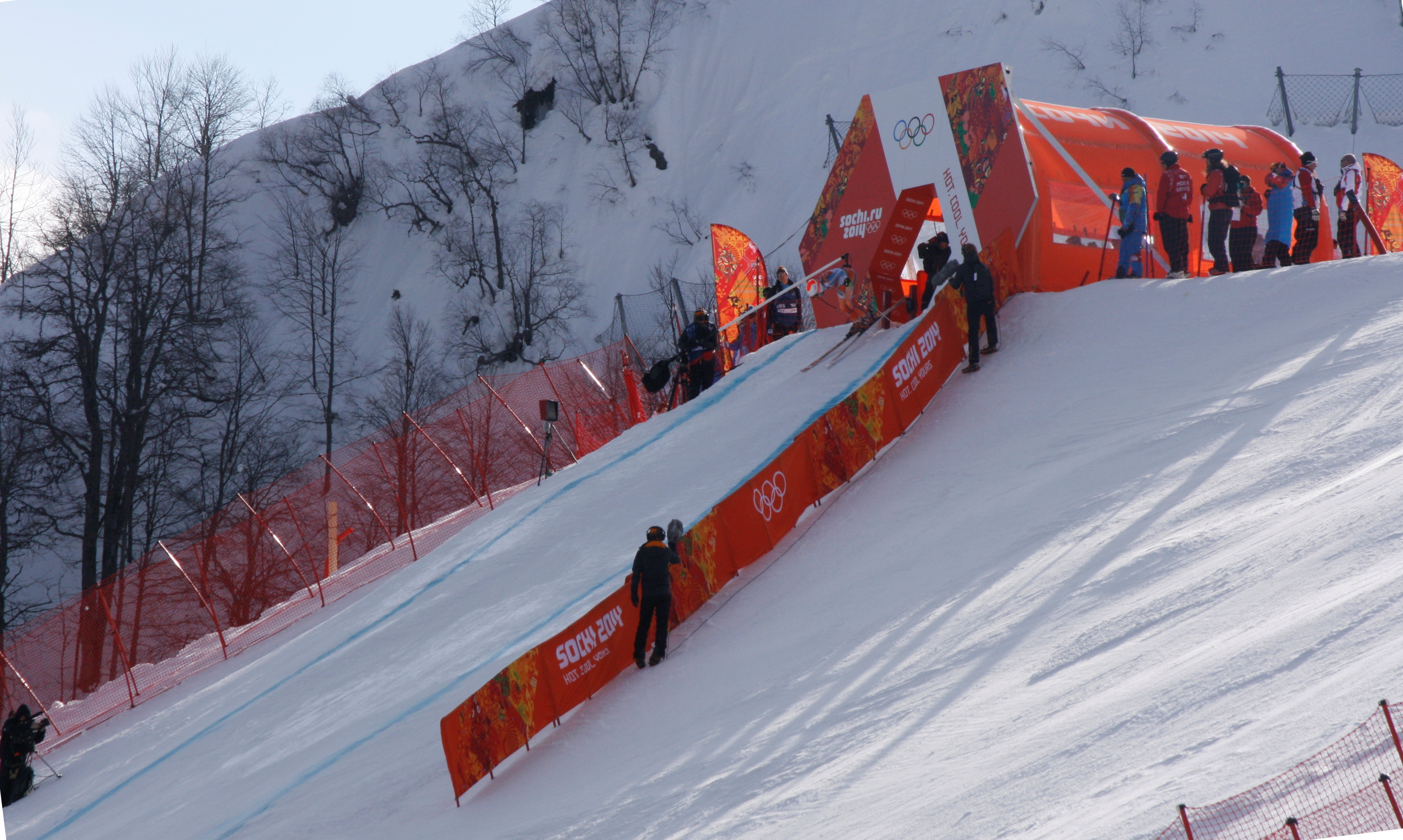
Starting gate

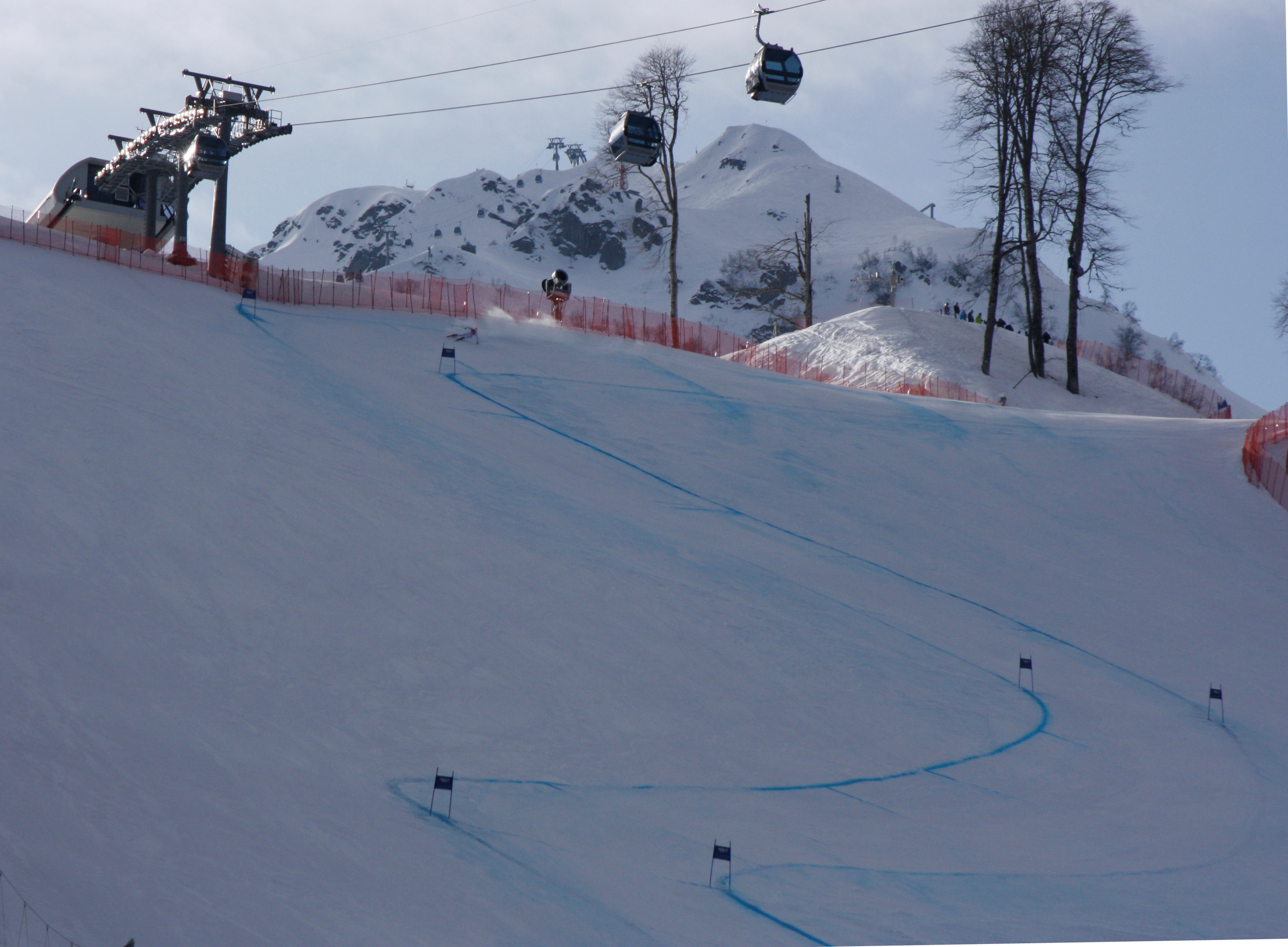
The course of women's downhill in Sochi

The women's downhill competition of the Sochi 2014 Olympics was held at the Rosa Khutor Alpine Resort near Krasnaya Polyana, Russia, on Wednesday, 12 February. The race was won by Tina Maze of Slovenia and Dominique Gisin of Switzerland, who posted the same time. Lara Gut, also of Switzerland, was a tenth of a second back and took the bronze medal.

== Summary ==
Fabienne Suter was the first out of the gate and led until Gisin surpassed her by 0.37 seconds. Immediately after Gisin, Daniela Merighetti took a provisional second position, and stayed there until Gut, skiing 18th, replaced her at 0.10 seconds behind Gisin. Maze was the 21st racer out of the gate and led at all the intervals, but finished with exactly the same time as Gisin. The best run after Maze was by Lotte Smiseth Sejersted of Norway, who finished sixth.

Defending Olympic champion Lindsey Vonn did not participate due to a knee injury, and the other defending medalists, Julia Mancuso and Elisabeth Görgl, finished outside the podium. It was the first time any Olympic alpine event has ended in a tie for the gold. Maze also won the first-ever gold medal for Slovenia at the Winter Olympics (since 1992), while Gisin and Gut both won their first Olympic medals.

The course started at an elevation of 1,755 m (5,758 ft) above sea level with a vertical drop of 790 m (2,592 ft) and a length of 2.713 km (1.69 mi). The winning time of 101.57 seconds yielded an average course speed of 96.158 km/h (59.7 mph), with an average vertical descent rate of 7.778 m/s (25.5 ft/s).

== Results ==
Wednesday, 12 February 2014

The race was started at 11:00 local time, (UTC+4). At the starting gate, the skies were partly cloudy, the temperature was 3.0 °C (37 °F), and the snow condition was hard. The temperature at the finish was 7.3 °C (45 °F). Six racers did not finish; Tina Weirather did not start due to a season-ending injury during a training run on the course.

Rank	Bib	Name	Country	Time	Difference
1st place, gold medalist(s)	21	Tina Maze	Slovenia	1:41.57	—
1st place, gold medalist(s)	8	Dominique Gisin	Switzerland	1:41.57	—
3rd place, bronze medalist(s)	18	Lara Gut	Switzerland	1:41.67	+0.10
4	9	Daniela Merighetti	Italy	1:41.84	+0.27
5	1	Fabienne Suter	Switzerland	1:41.94	+0.37
6	26	Lotte Smiseth Sejersted	Norway	1:42.01	+0.44
7	25	Edit Miklós	Hungary	1:42.28	+0.71
8	12	Julia Mancuso	United States	1:42.56	+0.99
9	5	Nicole Hosp	Austria	1:42.62	+1.05
10	27	Ilka Štuhec	Slovenia	1:42.65	+1.08
11	7	Laurenne Ross	United States	1:42.68	+1.11
12	11	Elena Fanchini	Italy	1:42.70	+1.13
13	20	Maria Höfl-Riesch	Germany	1:42.74	+1.17
14	23	Verena Stuffer	Italy	1:42.75	+1.18
15	3	Viktoria Rebensburg	Germany	1:42.76	+1.19
16	19	Elisabeth Görgl	Austria	1:42.82	+1.25
17	10	Stacey Cook	United States	1:43.05	+1.48
18	6	Maruša Ferk	Slovenia	1:43.24	+1.67
19	35	Chemmy Alcott	Great Britain	1:43.43	+1.86
20	28	Larisa Yurkiw	Canada	1:43.46	+1.89
21	29	Klára Křížová	Czech Republic	1:43.47	+1.90
22	30	Nadia Fanchini	Italy	1:43.48	+1.91
23	13	Kajsa Kling	Sweden	1:43.69	+2.12
24	14	Cornelia Hütter	Austria	1:43.82	+2.25
25	34	Sara Hector	Sweden	1:44.23	+2.66
26	2	Jacqueline Wiles	United States	1:44.35	+2.78
27	24	Ragnhild Mowinckel	Norway	1:44.43	+2.86
28	32	Elena Yakovishina	Russia	1:44.45	+2.88
29	37	Greta Small	Australia	1:44.79	+3.22
30	31	Maria Bedareva	Russia	1:45.29	+3.72
31	42	Kristína Saalová	Slovakia	1:45.98	+4.41
32	38	Macarena Simari Birkner	Argentina	1:46.44	+4.87
33	36	Karolina Chrapek	Poland	1:46.90	+5.33
34	40	Noelle Barahona	Chile	1:49.70	+8.13
35	41	Anna Berecz	Hungary	1:50.97	+9.40
	16	Tina Weirather	Liechtenstein	DNS	
	4	Marie Marchand-Arvier	France	DNF	
	15	Carolina Ruiz Castillo	Spain	DNF	
	17	Marianne Kaufmann-Abderhalden	Switzerland	DNF	
	22	Anna Fenninger	Austria	DNF	
	33	Alexandra Coletti	Monaco	DNF	
	39	Ania Monica Caill	Romania	DNF	
