= Julia Mancuso =

American alpine skier

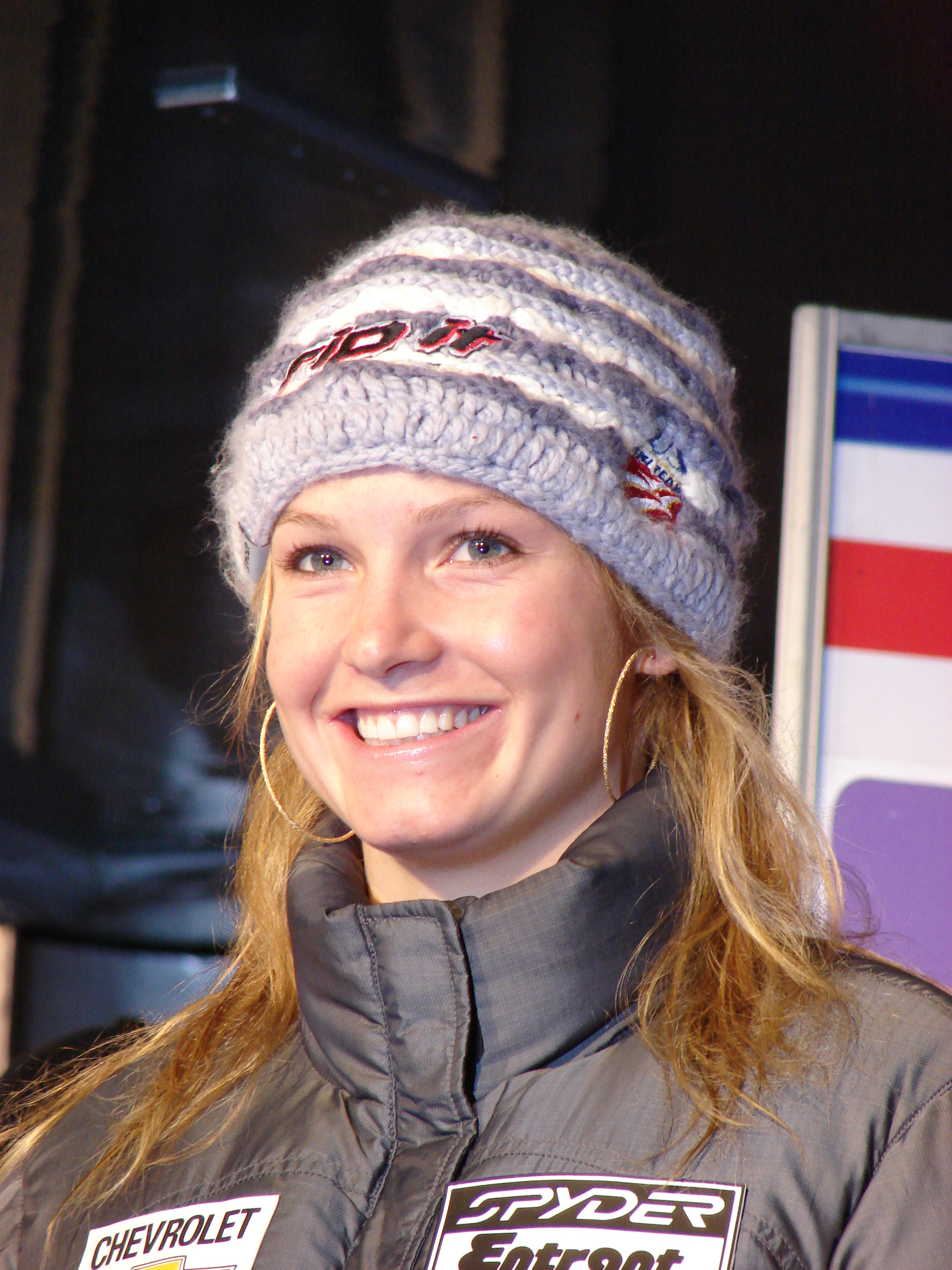
- Mancuso in December 2006

Personal information
- Born: March 9, 1984 (age 42) Reno, Nevada, U.S.
- Height: 5 ft 6 in (168 cm)
- Website: juliamancuso.com

Skiing career
- Sport: Alpine skiing
- Club: Squaw Valley Ski Team
- Retired: January 19, 2018 (age 33)
- Disciplines: Downhill, super-G, giant slalom, slalom, combined
- World Cup debut: November 20, 1999 (age 15)

Olympics
- Teams: 4 – (2002–14)
- Medals: 4 (1 gold)

World Championships
- Teams: 7 – (2003–15)
- Medals: 5 (0 gold)

World Cup
- Seasons: 14th – (2002–15)
- Wins: 7 – (3 DH, 2 SG, 1 SC, 1 CE)
- Podiums: 36
- Overall titles: 0 – (3rd in 2007)
- Discipline titles: 0 – (2nd in DH & K, 2007, & SG, 2012, 2013)
Medal record
Women's alpine skiing
Representing the United States
International alpine ski competitions
Event	1st	2nd	3rd
Olympic Games	1	2	1
World Championships	0	2	3
Total	1	4	4
Olympic Games
Gold medal – first place	2006 Turin	Giant slalom
Silver medal – second place	2010 Vancouver	Downhill
Silver medal – second place	2010 Vancouver	Combined
Bronze medal – third place	2014 Sochi	Combined
World Championships
Silver medal – second place	2007 Åre	Combined
Silver medal – second place	2011 Garmisch	Super-G
Bronze medal – third place	2005 Bormio	Super-G
Bronze medal – third place	2005 Bormio	Giant slalom
Bronze medal – third place	2013 Schladming	Super-G
Junior World Ski Championships
Gold medal – first place	2002 Tarvisio	Downhill
Gold medal – first place	2002 Tarvisio	Giant slalom
Gold medal – first place	2002 Tarvisio	Combined
Gold medal – first place	2003 Puy St. Vincent	Super-G
Gold medal – first place	2004 Maribor	Combined
Bronze medal – third place	2001 Verbier	Combined
Bronze medal – third place	2003 Puy St. Vincent	Downhill
Bronze medal – third place	2004 Maribor	Super-G

Julia Marie Mancuso (born March 9, 1984) is an American retired World Cup alpine ski racer. She won the gold medal in giant slalom at the 2006 Winter Olympics, and was the silver medalist in both downhill and combined in 2010, and the bronze medalist in the combined in 2014. She has also won five medals (two silver and three bronze) at the World Championships and seven races in regular World Cup competition. Mancuso's four Olympic medals are tied for the most ever for a female American alpine skier with Mikaela Shiffrin.

== Racing career ==
Mancuso made her World Cup debut at the age of 15 at Copper Mountain, Colorado, on November 20, 1999. She was scouted by Patrick Rooney. Mancuso scored her first World Cup points (top-30 finish) during the 2001 season. While Mancuso often struggled in World Cup races over the next few seasons, she enjoyed exceptional success at the Junior World Championships, winning a record eight medals, including five golds in 2002, 2003 and 2004. She was selected for the 2002 Winter Olympics at the age of 17, where she finished 13th in the combined event.

Mancuso's World Cup results improved dramatically during the 2005 season, as she climbed to ninth place overall from 55th place in 2004. At the 2005 World Championships, she won bronze medals in both the super-G and the giant slalom competitions. She took her first World Cup podium by finishing second in a super-G in Cortina d'Ampezzo in 2006. Her gold medal at the 2006 Turin Winter Olympics was unexpected, as she had just three podiums (finishing events in the top three) that season, though all were within weeks of the Olympics. Only one of those podiums was in giant slalom, a third place in the final GS race before the Olympics.

Mancuso won the race despite ongoing pain in her right knee, which was finally traced to hip dysplasia. She would finish the 2006 season in eighth place, including podium finishes in three races, although she could sometimes barely walk by season's end.

At the start of the off-season, Mancuso endured arthroscopic surgery on her right hip to remove an inch-long bone spur on the ball of the joint. After several months off skis, she resumed training with the U.S. team in August, at their summer ski camp in South America. By the start of the 2007 season, she was almost fully recovered.

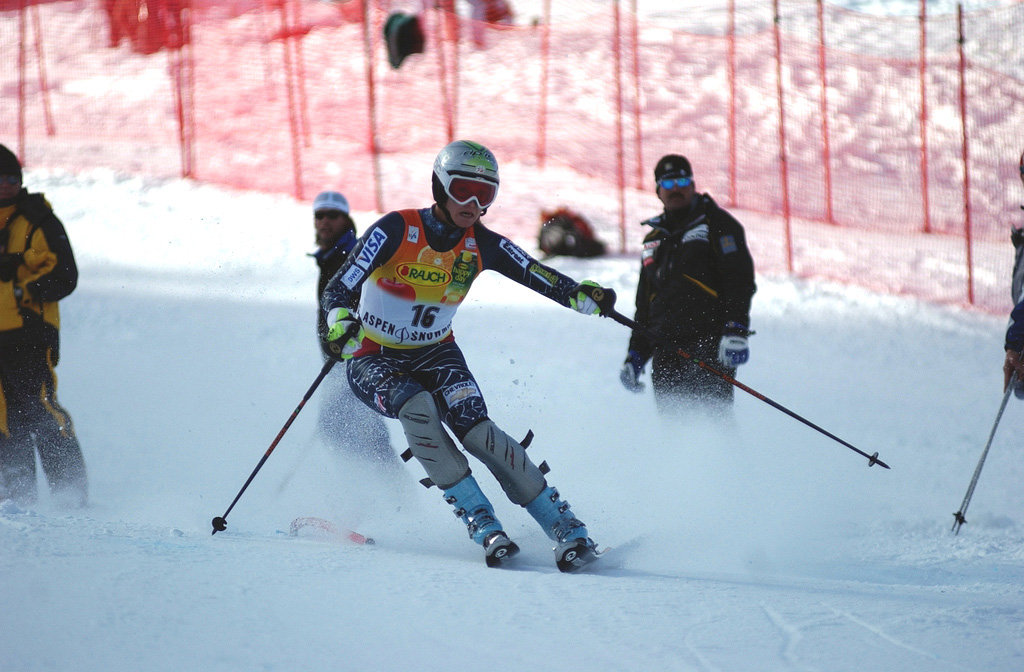
Mancuso at Aspen in November 2006

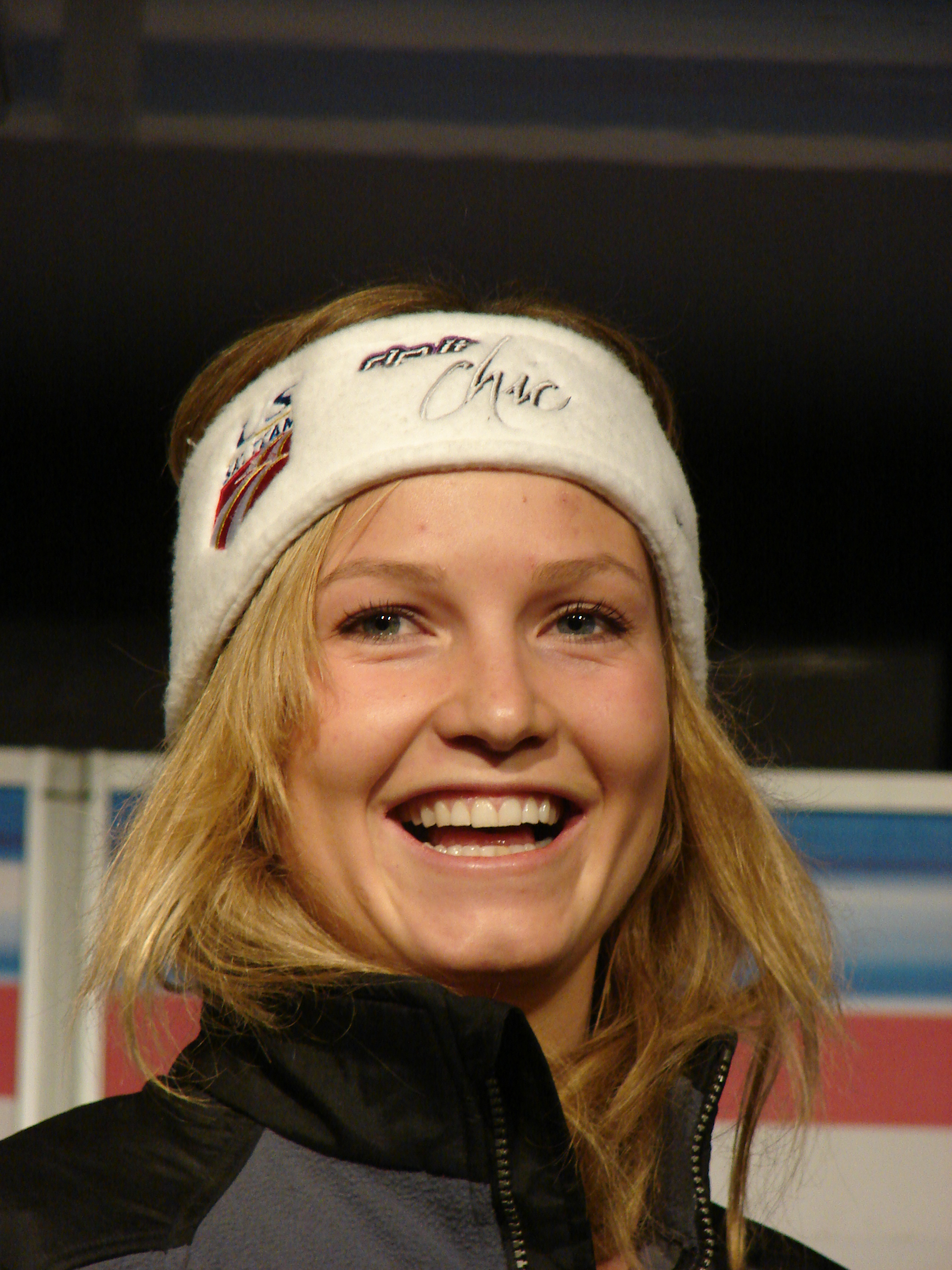
Mancuso in December 2006

Although she started off slowly, with a number of disappointing results in the first few weeks as she worked back into race shape, the 2007 season would turn out to be Mancuso's breakout year on the World Cup circuit. She won her first World Cup race on December 19, 2006, a downhill in Val-d'Isère, France, and then took second in another downhill the next day. She went on to win three more races during the season; a super-G, a super combined, and another downhill. At the 2007 World Championships in Åre, Sweden, she won a silver medal in the super combined. After finishing on the podium in three consecutive races (2nd, 1st, 3rd) in Tarvisio, Italy, on March 2–4, 2007, she was tied for the overall World Cup lead. She eventually finished the season in third place overall, the best finish by an American woman since Tamara McKinney in 1984, until Lindsey Vonn won the overall title in 2008. Mancuso finished in second place in the 2007 season standings for both downhill and combined.

Following the 2008 season, Mancuso did not achieve a top-three finish in World Cup events for nearly two years due to back problems, so her silver medal in the women's downhill at the 2010 Vancouver Olympics was another surprise. The very next day, she won another silver in the women's super combined, an event that incorporates both a downhill and a slalom run. However, while Mancuso was trying to defend her title in giant slalom, Lindsey Vonn crashed after Mancuso, the next skier, had started, forcing Mancuso's run to be stopped just before she reached Vonn's crash. Forced to restart from the back of the pack, Mancuso only managed an 18th-place first run, and her strong second run only brought her up to eighth overall. Her Olympic performances did however lead to a revival in form, as she took 16 World Cup podium finishes and two more World Championship medals over the next four years.

On the first competition day at the 2011 World Championships in Garmisch, Germany, she once again proved her strength at big events by winning the silver medal in the super-G. A month later she won her first World Cup race in over four years, a victory in the downhill at the World Cup finals in Lenzerheide, Switzerland. Since this was a few days after a terrible earthquake and tsunami in Japan, she launched a fundraiser by pledging half her race earnings of the World Cup finals to the skiershelpingjapan.com campaign website.

Over the three seasons through 2013, Mancuso was on the World Cup podium in at least 10 races, placing well in the season standings in varied events. But she finished in the top 15 in only one of the several late-2013 events that launched the 2014 season, and decided to take a break from the World Cup circuit to refresh for the 2014 Olympics. Mancuso's strategy worked, as she won her fourth Olympic medal, a bronze, in the women's super combined at the 2014 Sochi Olympics, after placing first in the downhill section.

During the 2014-15 season, Mancuso scored what would be her last World Cup podium in a downhill at Lake Louise, finishing third behind team-mates Lindsey Vonn and Stacey Cook as part of an American clean sweep of the podium places. After the end of the season Mancuso had to undergo a hip surgery in order to relieve persistent pain which was disabling her from skiing: as a result she missed the 2015-16 and 2016-17 seasons.

Mancuso returned to competition in December 2017, failing to finish a World Cup super-G in St. Moritz. She made two more appearances at the super-G races in Val-d'Isère a week later, however she could only manage a best finish of 42nd place. The following month, she announced her retirement from competition, making her final appearance in a downhill at Cortina d'Ampezzo - the venue where she had taken her first World Cup podium - whilst wearing a Wonder Woman outfit and a cape.

Mancuso was known as a particularly strong competitor in major championships: whilst she took a total of 36 World Cup podium finishes from 398 races (nine percent), her nine Olympic and World Championship medals from 40 starts gave her a strike rate of 23 percent.

== World Cup results ==
=== Season standings ===
Season	Age	Overall	Slalom	Giant slalom	Super-G	Downhill	Combined
2001	16	113	55	—	47	—	—
2002	17	73	—	—	37	33	17
2003	18	46	44	—	25	27	5
2004	19	55	32	58	27	42	—
2005	20	9	26	7	13	10	6
2006	21	8	22	11	6	11	8
2007	22	3	24	4	4	2	2
2008	23	7	28	5	8	7	6
2009	24	27	42	17	27	24	36
2010	25	20	—	28	16	9	22
2011	26	5	51	9	3	3	8
2012	27	4	50	9	2	5	22
2013	28	4	33	11	2	9	6
2014	29	22	—	30	14	16	—
2015	30	21	—	39	11	13	12
2016	31	hip surgery, out for these 2 seasons					
2017	32	hip surgery, out for these 2 seasons					
2018	33	—	—	—	—	—	—

=== Race podiums ===
- 7 wins – (3 DH, 2 SG, 1 SC, 1 CE)
- 36 podiums – (12 DH, 15 SG, 5 GS, 3 SC, 1 CE)

Season	Date	Location	Discipline	Place
2006	27 Jan 2006	Cortina d'Ampezzo, Italy	Super-G	2nd
2006	28 Jan 2006	Cortina d'Ampezzo, Italy	Downhill	2nd
2006	4 Feb 2006	Ofterschwang, Germany	Giant slalom	3rd
2007	19 Dec 2006	Val-d'Isère, France	Downhill	1st
2007	20 Dec 2006	Val-d'Isère, France	Downhill	2nd
2007	13 Jan 2007	Altenmarkt, Austria	Downhill	3rd
2007	14 Jan 2007	Altenmarkt, Austria	Super combined	1st
2007	19 Jan 2007	Cortina d'Ampezzo, Italy	Super-G	1st
2007	20 Jan 2007	Cortina d'Ampezzo, Italy	Downhill	2nd
2007	21 Jan 2007	Cortina d'Ampezzo, Italy	Giant slalom	2nd
2007	2 Mar 2007	Tarvisio, Italy	Super combined	2nd
2007	3 Mar 2007	Tarvisio, Italy	Downhill	1st
2007	4 Mar 2007	Tarvisio, Italy	Super-G	3rd
2008	27 Oct 2007	Sölden, Austria	Giant slalom	2nd
2008	21 Dec 2007	St. Anton, Austria	Downhill	3rd
2008	22 Dec 2007	St. Anton, Austria	Super combined	3rd
2008	28 Dec 2007	Lienz, Austria	Giant slalom	2nd
2008	20 Jan 2008	Cortina d'Ampezzo, Italy	Super-G	2nd
2008	22 Feb 2008	Whistler, Canada	Downhill	3rd
2010	7 Mar 2010	Crans-Montana, Switzerland	Super-G	3rd
2011	5 Dec 2010	Lake Louise, Canada	Super-G	3rd
2011	22 Jan 2011	Cortina d'Ampezzo, Italy	Downhill	2nd
2011	27 Feb 2011	Åre, Sweden	Super-G	3rd
2011	6 Mar 2011	Tarvisio, Italy	Super-G	2nd
2011	16 Mar 2011	Lenzerheide, Switzerland	Downhill	1st
2012	26 Nov 2011	Aspen, USA	Giant slalom	3rd
2012	4 Dec 2011	Lake Louise, Canada	Super-G	3rd
2012	7 Jan 2012	Bad Kleinkirchheim, Austria	Downhill	2nd
2012	5 Feb 2012	Garmisch, Germany	Super-G	1st
2012	21 Feb 2012	Moscow, Russia	City event	1st
2012	15 Mar 2012	Schladming, Austria	Super-G	2nd
2013	2 Dec 2012	Lake Louise, Canada	Super-G	2nd
2013	8 Dec 2012	St. Moritz, Switzerland	Super-G	3rd
2013	1 Mar 2013	Garmisch, Germany	Super-G	2nd
2013	3 Mar 2013	Garmisch, Germany	Super-G	3rd
2015	6 Dec 2014	Lake Louise, Canada	Downhill	3rd

== World Championship results ==
Year	Age	Slalom	Giant slalom	Super-G	Downhill	Combined
2003	18	DNF1	—	21	—	7
2005	20	8	3	3	—	9
2007	22	—	5	6	10	2
2009	24	—	18	DNF	—	DNF1
2011	26	DNF1	16	2	6	7
2013	28	—	22	3	5	8
2015	30	—	—	9	16	15

== Olympic results ==
Year	Age	Slalom	Giant slalom	Super-G	Downhill	Combined
2002	17	—	—	—	—	13
2006	21	—	1	11	7	9
2010	25	—	8	9	2	2
2014	29	—	DNF1	8	8	3

== Lifestyle and endorsements ==
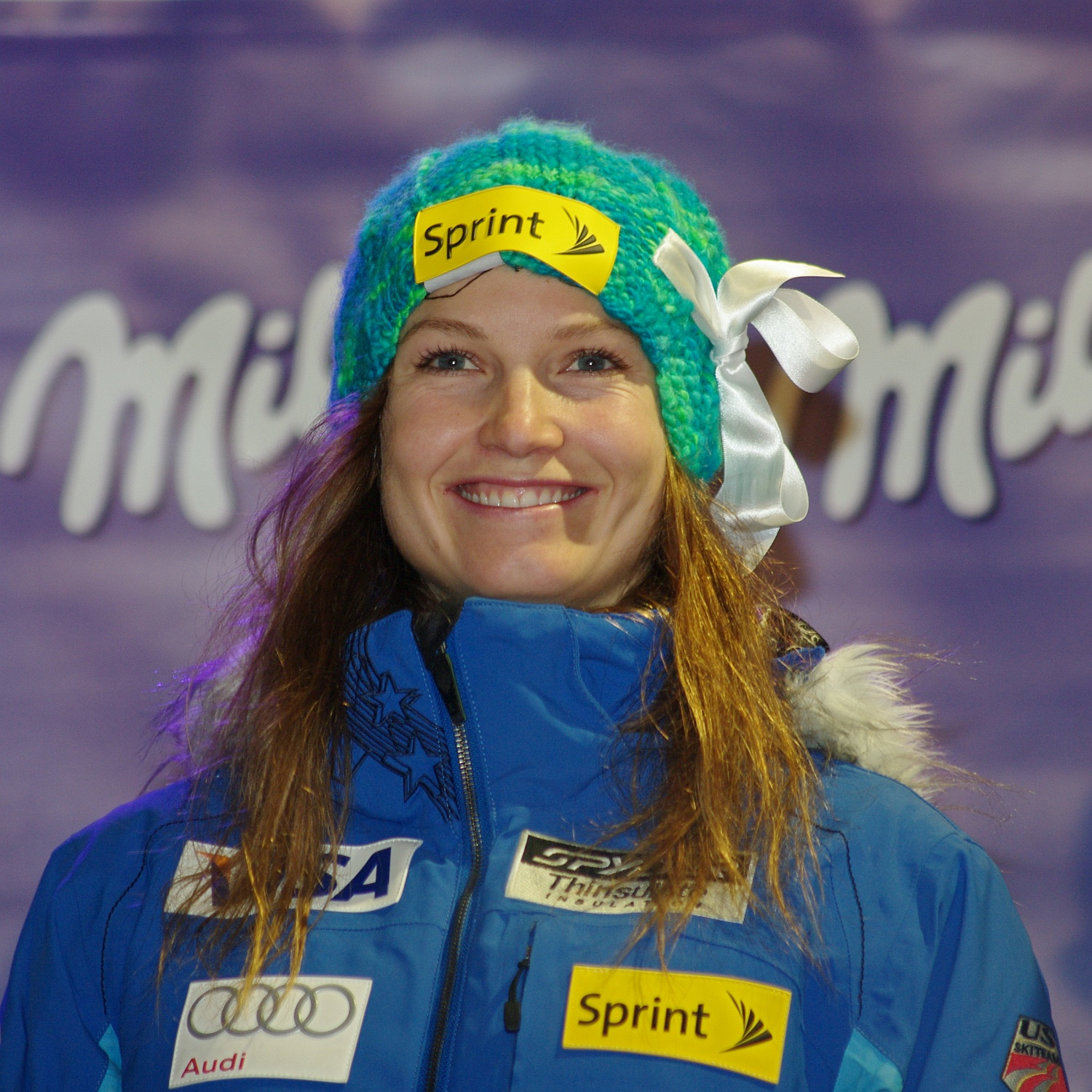
Mancuso in January 2011

Mancuso's nickname among her U.S. Ski Team teammates and fans is "Super Jules". Following her Olympic gold medal in 2006, a ski run formerly called "Exhibition" at Squaw Valley Ski Resort was renamed "Julia's Gold".

After her coach gave her a plastic tiara as a good-luck token in 2005, she wore it over her racing helmet during several slalom races. She wore her tiara following her silver medal run in the women's downhill and again at the medal ceremony at the 2010 Winter Olympics. In 2010, Mancuso launched her own lingerie line named Kiss My Tiara. Mancuso also models lingerie and has been memorably quoted as saying, "I think underwear is my calling. You can be feminine and fast."

In December 2006, Lange ski boots announced that Mancuso would be the first-ever "Lange Girl Athlete", and be the subject of posters, images, and an "ongoing effort to showcase exceptional women ski athletes who are also attractive and inspiring". She switched to Völkl skis and Marker bindings following the 2010 season; she was previously with Rossignol. Mancuso changed equipment suppliers after the 2012 season and now uses Head skis, boots, and bindings.

During the 2010 Winter Olympics, VISA featured Mancuso in an animated story describing how as a child she had drawn a picture of herself as a gold medalist, and closing with a photograph of her after winning the gold medal in 2006. She also starred in a commercial for 24 Hour Fitness called 'Reach Your Potential', directed by Brent Roske. In 2012, Mancuso appeared in the GoPro Hero3 video promotion.

== Personal life ==
Of Italian descent, Mancuso was born in Reno, Nevada, and grew up in the nearby Lake Tahoe area as the middle of three sisters, between older sister April and younger sister Sara. Her father, Ciro Mancuso, was arrested at the family home when Julia was five years old, and was later convicted of running a $140 million marijuana smuggling operation. Her parents divorced in 1992, and her mother Andrea (née Tuffanelli) said that Julia "took everything out on the slopes." After his release from prison in 2000, Julia and her father became close. Ciro's sentence was greatly reduced because of his cooperation with the government in cases against other alleged organization members and Mancuso's lawyer Patrick Hallinan. As a result of his assistance to the government, Ciro Mancuso was allowed to keep $5 million in proceeds from his trafficking business.

Mancuso graduated from The Winter Sports School in Park City, Utah, in 2000 and resides in Olympic Valley, California.

She dated Norwegian alpine skier Aksel Lund Svindal for four years, until they decided to go their separate ways in September 2013. During her post-2015 injury layoff, Mancuso married surfer Dylan Fish. In July 2019, Mancuso gave birth to their son Sonny Fish Mancuso.
