= Bohdana Matsotska =

Ukrainian alpine skier (born 1989)

Personal information
- Full name: Bohdana Olehivna Matsotska
- Born: 27 August 1989 (age 36) Kosiv, Ivano-Frankivsk Oblast, Ukrainian SSR, Soviet Union

Sport
- Sport: Skiing
- Updated on February 10, 2013

Bohdana Olehivna Matsotska (Ukrainian: Богдана Олегівна Мацьоцька, also spelled Bogdana, born August 27, 1989) is an alpine skier from Ukraine. She competed for Ukraine at the 2010 Winter Olympics and was to compete for Ukraine at the 2014 Winter Olympics. Her best result was a 37th place in the slalom, achieved in 2010.

On 19 February 2014 Matsotska refused further participating in the 2014 Winter Olympics in protest against the violent clashes in Ukrainian's capital Kyiv the previous day. She and her father posted a message on Facebook stating "In solidarity with the fighters on the barricades of the Maidan, and as a protest against the criminal actions made towards the protesters, the irresponsibility of the president and his lackey government, we refuse further performance at the Olympic Games in Sochi 2014".

== Performances ==
Level	Year	Event	SL	GS	SG	DH	SC	T
JWSC	2008	Formigal, Spain	43	61	70	50	19	
JWSC	2009	Garmisch-Partenkirchen, Germany			41	44		
AWSC	2009	Val d'Isère, France	DNF1	42	33			
OLY	2010	Whistler, Canada	37	44				
AWSC	2011	Garmisch-Partenkirchen, Germany	DNF1	52	38	34	26	
AWSC	2013	Schladming, Austria	61	46	DNS1		32	
