= Daniela Kotschová =

Slovak cross-country skier (born 1985)

Personal information
- Nationality: Slovakia
- Born: 19 September 1985 (age 40) Poprad, Czechoslovakia

Sport
- Sport: Skiing

World Cup career
- Seasons: 4 – (2008–2010, 2014)
- Indiv. starts: 6
- Indiv. podiums: 0
- Team starts: 0
- Overall titles: 0
- Discipline titles: 0

Daniela Kotschová (born 19 September 1985 in Poprad) is a Slovak cross-country skier.

Kotschová competed at the 2014 Winter Olympics for Slovakia. She placed 55th in the qualifying round in the sprint, failing to advance to the knockout stages. She also teamed with Alena Procházková in the team sprint, finishing 7th in their semifinal and failing to advance.

As of April 2014, her best showing at the World Championships is 66th, in the classical sprint in 2013.

Kotschová made her World Cup debut in March 2008. As of April 2014, her best finish is 48th, in a freestyle sprint race at Düsseldorf in 2008–09. Her best World Cup overall finish is 60th, in 2013–14. Her best World Cup finish in a discipline is 34th, in the sprint in 2013–14.

== Cross-country skiing results ==
All results are sourced from the International Ski Federation (FIS).

=== Olympic Games ===
Year	Age	10 km individual	15 km skiathlon	30 km mass start	Sprint	4 × 5 km relay	Team sprint
2014	28	—	—	—	54	—	13

=== World Championships ===
Year	Age	10 km individual	15 km skiathlon	30 km mass start	Sprint	4 × 5 km relay	Team sprint
2013	27	—	—	—	66	—	—

=== World Cup ===
==== Season standings ====
Season	Age	Discipline standings			Ski Tour standings		
Season	Age	Overall	Distance	Sprint	Nordic Opening	Tour de Ski	World Cup Final
2008	22	NC	—	NC	—N/a	—	—
2009	23	NC	—	NC	—N/a	—	—
2010	24	NC	—	NC	—N/a	—	—
2014	28	NC	—	NC	—	—	—
