= Kristína Saalová =

Slovak alpine skier (born 1991)

Personal information
- Born: 20 May 1991 (age 35) Banská Bystrica, Slovakia
- Height: 1.71 m (5 ft 7 in)
- Weight: 70 kg (154 lb)

Sport
- Country: Slovakia
- Sport: Alpine skiing

Kristína Saalová (born 20 May 1991 in Banská Bystrica, Slovakia) is an alpine skier from Slovakia. She competed for Slovakia at the 2014 Winter Olympics in the alpine skiing events.
