= Alpine skiing at the 2010 Winter Olympics =

Alpine skiing at the XXI Olympic Winter Games
- Venue: Whistler Creekside; Whistler, British Columbia; Canada
- Dates: 15–27 February 2010
- No. of events: 10
- Competitors: 309 from 71 nations

Location in Canada
Locations in British Columbia

Alpine skiing at the 2010 Winter Olympics was held in Canada at Whistler Creekside in Whistler, British Columbia, north of Vancouver. The ten events were scheduled for 13–27 February; weather delayed the first event, the men's downhill, two days until Monday, 15 February.

== Medal table ==
Notably absent from the medals in these Olympics were the Austrian men, who had won 8 medals in 2006 and 7 in 2002. France and host Canada were shut out from the podium, as were the German men and the Swiss and Italian women. The U.S. had its best Olympics ever with eight alpine medals, only the fourth nation to achieve that total in a single Olympics (Austria, France, Switzerland).

Individually, three men and five women won multiple medals; triple medalists were Bode Miller of the U.S. and Aksel Lund Svindal of Norway, who both won a medal of each color. The sole double gold medalist was Maria Riesch of Germany.

Rank	Nation	Gold	Silver	Bronze	Total
1	Germany	3	0	0	3
2	United States	2	3	3	8
3	Switzerland	2	0	1	3
4	Norway	1	2	1	4
5	Austria	1	1	2	4
6	Italy	1	0	0	1
7	Croatia	0	2	0	2
7	Slovenia	0	2	0	2
9	Sweden	0	0	2	2
10	Czech Republic	0	0	1	1
Totals (10 entries)		10	10	10	30

=== Men's events ===
Event	Gold		Silver		Bronze	
Downhill	Didier Défago; Switzerland	1:54.31	Aksel Lund Svindal; Norway	1:54.38	Bode Miller; United States	1:54.40
Super-G	Aksel Lund Svindal; Norway	1:30.34	Bode Miller; United States	1:30.62	Andrew Weibrecht; United States	1:30.65
Giant slalom	Carlo Janka; Switzerland	2:37.83	Kjetil Jansrud; Norway	2:38.22	Aksel Lund Svindal; Norway	2:38.44
Slalom	Giuliano Razzoli; Italy	1:39.32	Ivica Kostelić; Croatia	1:39.48	André Myhrer; Sweden	1:39.76
Super combined	Bode Miller; United States	2:44.92	Ivica Kostelić; Croatia	2:45.25	Silvan Zurbriggen; Switzerland	2:45.32

=== Women's events ===
Event	Gold		Silver		Bronze	
Downhill	Lindsey Vonn; United States	1:44.19	Julia Mancuso; United States	1:44.75	Elisabeth Görgl; Austria	1:45.65
Super-G	Andrea Fischbacher; Austria	1:20.14	Tina Maze; Slovenia	1:20.63	Lindsey Vonn; United States	1:20.88
Giant slalom	Viktoria Rebensburg; Germany	2:27.11	Tina Maze; Slovenia	2:27.15	Elisabeth Görgl; Austria	2:27.25
Slalom	Maria Riesch; Germany	1:42.89	Marlies Schild; Austria	1:43.32	Šárka Záhrobská; Czech Republic	1:43.90
Super combined	Maria Riesch; Germany	2:09.14	Julia Mancuso; United States	2:10.08	Anja Pärson; Sweden	2:10.19

== Competition schedule ==
Day	Date	Start	Finish	Event	Date run
Day 2	Sat 13 Feb	11:45	13:15	Downhill – men	Mon 15 Feb
Day 3	Sun 14 Feb	10:00	11:30	Super combined – women	Thu 18 Feb
Day 3	Sun 14 Feb	13:00	14:00	Super combined – women	Thu 18 Feb
Day 5	Tue 16 Feb	10:00	11:30	Super combined – men	Sun 21 Feb
Day 5	Tue 16 Feb	13:30	14:30	Super combined – men	Sun 21 Feb
Day 6	Wed 17 Feb	11:00	12:45	Downhill – women	Wed 17 Feb
Day 8	Fri 19 Feb	11:30	13:00	Super-G – men	Fri 19 Feb
Day 9	Sat 20 Feb	10:00	11:45	Super-G – women	Sat 20 Feb
Day 10	Sun 21 Feb	10:00	11:45	Giant slalom – men	Tue 23 Feb
Day 10	Sun 21 Feb	13:45	15:00	Giant slalom – men	Tue 23 Feb
Day 13	Wed 24 Feb	10:00	11:45	Giant slalom – women	Wed 24 Feb
Day 13	Wed 24 Feb	13:15	14:30	Giant slalom – women	Thu 25 Feb
Day 15	Fri 26 Feb	10:00	11:45	Slalom – women	Fri 26 Feb
Day 15	Fri 26 Feb	13:30	14:45	Slalom – women	Fri 26 Feb
Day 16	Sat 27 Feb	10:00	11:45	Slalom – men	Sat 27 Feb
Day 16	Sat 27 Feb	13:45	14:45	Slalom – men	Sat 27 Feb

All times are Pacific Standard Time (UTC-8).

=== Course information ===
Date	Race	Start elevation	Finish elevation	Vertical drop	Course length	Average gradient
Mon 15-Feb	Downhill – men	1,678 m (5,505 ft)	825 m (2,707 ft)	853 m (2,799 ft)	3.105 km (1.929 mi)	27.5%
Wed 17-Feb	Downhill – women	1,595 m (5,233 ft)	825 m (2,707 ft)	770 m (2,526 ft)	2.939 km (1.826 mi)	26.2%
Sun 21-Feb	Downhill – (SC) – men	1,678 m (5,505 ft)	825 m (2,707 ft)	853 m (2,799 ft)	3.105 km (1.929 mi)	27.5%
Thu 18-Feb	Downhill – (SC) – women	1,500 m (4,921 ft)	825 m (2,707 ft)	675 m (2,215 ft)	2.500 km (1.553 mi)	27.0%
Fri 19-Feb	Super-G – men	1,440 m (4,724 ft)	825 m (2,707 ft)	615 m (2,018 ft)	2.200 km (1.367 mi)	28.0%
Sat 20-Feb	Super-G – women	1,425 m (4,675 ft)	825 m (2,707 ft)	600 m (1,969 ft)	2.005 km (1.246 mi)	29.9%
Tue 23-Feb	Giant slalom – men	1,210 m (3,970 ft)	805 m (2,641 ft)	405 m (1,329 ft)	1.512 km (0.940 mi)	26.8%
Wed 24-Feb	Giant slalom – women	1,177 m (3,862 ft)	805 m (2,641 ft)	372 m (1,220 ft)	1.309 km (0.813 mi)	28.4%
Sat 27-Feb	Slalom – men	985 m (3,232 ft)	805 m (2,641 ft)	180 m (591 ft)	0.610 km (0.379 mi)	29.5%
Fri 26-Feb	Slalom – women	985 m (3,232 ft)	805 m (2,641 ft)	180 m (591 ft)		
Sun 21-Feb	Slalom – (SC) – men	1,005 m (3,297 ft)	805 m (2,641 ft)	200 m (656 ft)	0.733 km (0.455 mi)	27.3%
Thu 18-Feb	Slalom – (SC) – women	974 m (3,196 ft)	805 m (2,641 ft)	169 m (554 ft)	0.785 km (0.488 mi)	21.5%

- The finish area was above the base area of Whistler Creekside, which is at an elevation of 655 metres (2,150 ft) above sea level.

== Athletes ==
=== Qualification standards ===
The FIS point list used to determine entry into the Olympics was from 18 January 2010.

There could be a maximum of 320 athletes competing in alpine skiing, with no more than 22 per NOC (there was a further limit of 14 male and 14 female per NOC). Additionally, each NOC could enter a maximum of four skiers per event.

To qualify, the competitor had to reach either the "A" or "B" standard.

- "A" qualification standard: the competitor is in the top 500 of the FIS points list in at least one event. If the event is downhill, super-G or super combined, he or she requires at least 120 FIS points.
- "B" qualification standard: if an NOC does not have a male or female athlete that meets the "A" Standard, then they may enter an athlete of that gender in slalom or giant slalom only, provided that the athlete has at most 140 FIS points in the event and has taken part in the FIS Alpine World Ski Championships 2009.

=== Demographics ===
As of 28 February 2010, there were 309 athletes listed as competitors in alpine skiing at the Games, representing 71 countries.

The youngest alpine skier in the 2010 Olympic Games was Ghassan Achi of Lebanon, age 16 at the time of competition (born 28 July 1993). The oldest was Hubertus von Hohenlohe of Mexico, age 51 (born 2 February 1959).

== Competing nations ==
The following nations entered the following number of alpine skiers.

NOC	Men	Women	Total
Albania	1		1
Andorra	2	2	4
Argentina	2	3	5
Armenia	1	1	2
Australia	2		2
Austria	11	8	19
Azerbaijan	1	1	2
Belarus		2	2
Belgium	2	1	3
Bosnia and Herzegovina	1	2	3
Belgium	1	1	2
Brazil	1	1	2
Bulgaria	2	1	3
Canada	12	9	21
Cayman Islands	1		1
Chile	2	1	3
China	1	1	2
Colombia		1	1
Croatia	5	5	10
Cyprus	1	1	2
Czech Republic	5	3	8
Denmark	2	1	3
Estonia	1	1	2
Finland	2	2	4
France	10	12	22
Georgia	2	1	3
Germany	2	7	9
Ghana	1		1
Great Britain	3	1	4
Greece	2	1	3
Hungary	1	2	3
Iceland	3	1	4
India	1		1
Iran	2	1	3
Ireland	1	1	2
Israel	1		1
Italy	12	9	21
Japan	2	1	3
Kazakhstan	1	1	2
Kyrgyzstan	1		1
Latvia	2	1	3
Lebanon	1	2	3
Liechtenstein	1	2	3
Lithuania	1		1
Macedonia	1		1
Mexico	1		1
Moldova	2		2
Monaco		1	1
Montenegro	1		1
Morocco	1		1
New Zealand	2		2
Norway	5	1	6
Pakistan	1		1
Peru	1	1	2
Poland		1	1
Romania	2	1	3
Russia	3	2	5
San Marino	1		1
Senegal	1		1
Serbia		3	3
Slovenia	10	3	13
Slovakia	1	2	3
South Africa	1		1
South Korea	2	1	3
Spain	2	3	5
Sweden	7	5	12
Switzerland	9	5	14
Tajikistan	1		1
Turkey	1	1	2
Ukraine	1	2	3
United States	10	10	20
Uzbekistan	1	1	2
Total athletes	176	131	309
Total NOCs	66	51	71

== See also ==
- Alpine skiing at the 2010 Winter Paralympics
