= Alpine skiing at the 2014 Winter Olympics =

Alpine Skiing at the XXII Olympic Winter Games
- Venue: Rosa Khutor Alpine Resort; Krasnaya Polyana, Russia
- Dates: 9–22 February 2014
- No. of events: 10
- Competitors: 327 from 74 nations

Location in European Russia
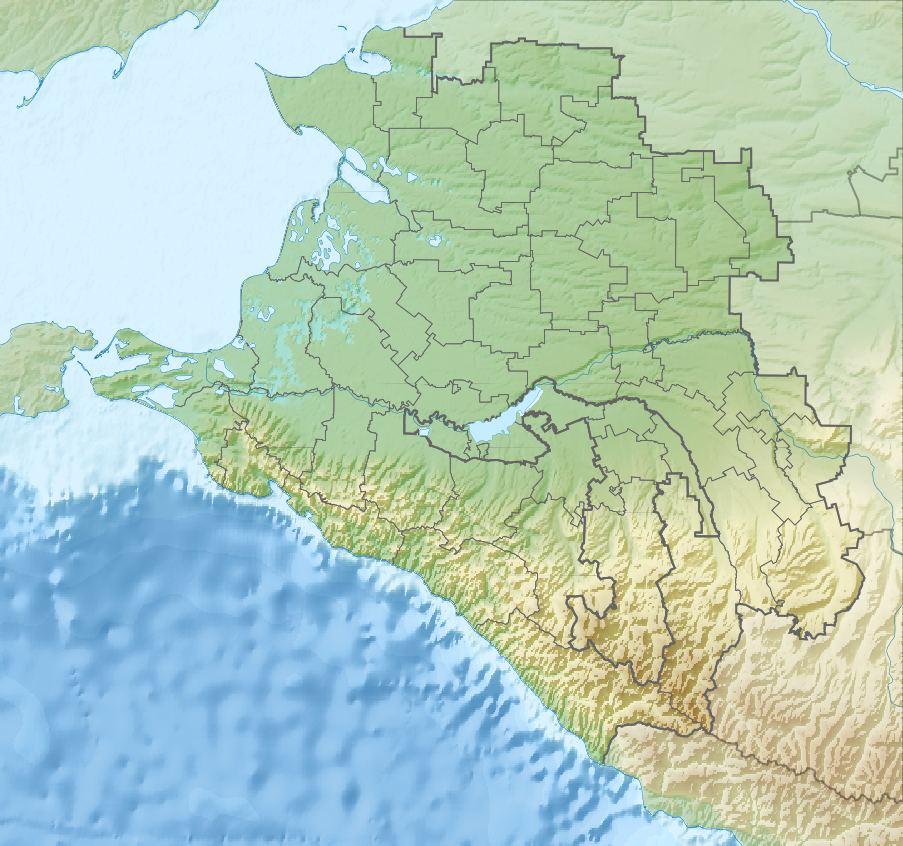
Locations in Krasnodar Krai

Alpine skiing at the 2014 Winter Olympics was held in Russia from 9–22 February at Rosa Khutor Alpine Resort near Krasnaya Polyana, east of Sochi.

== Competition schedule ==
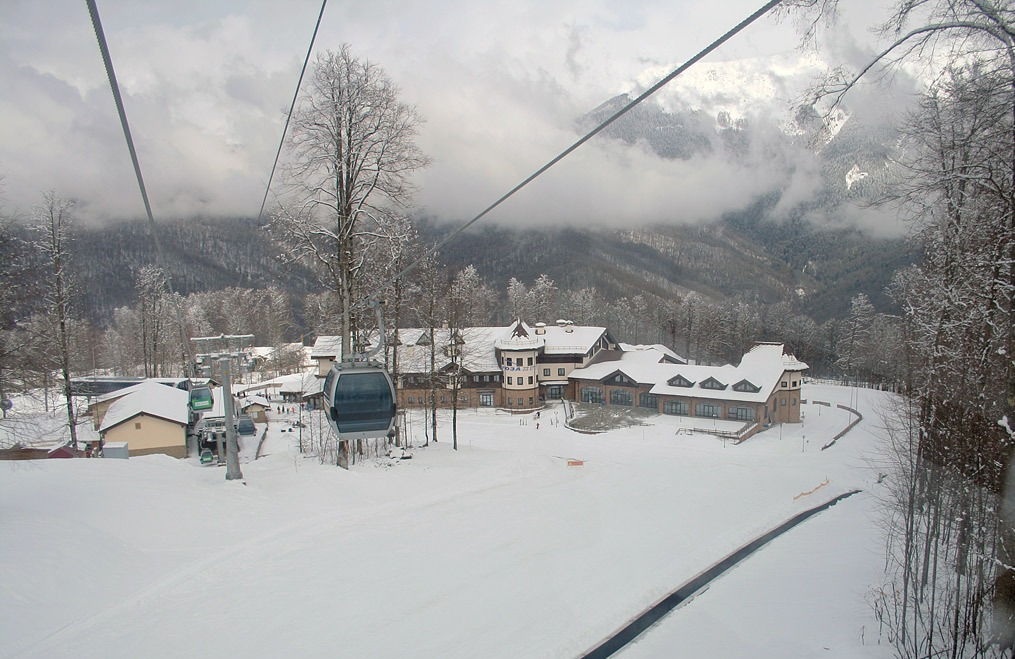
Rosa Khutor Alpine Resort, the venue for alpine skiing

The following is the competition schedule for all ten events.

All times are (UTC+4).

Date	Time	Event
9 February	11:00	Men's downhill
10 February	11:00	Women's super combined
10 February	15:00	Women's super combined
12 February	11:00	Women's downhill
14 February	10:00	Men's super combined
14 February	15:30	Men's super combined
15 February	11:00	Women's super-G
16 February	10:00	Men's super-G
18 February	9:30	Women's giant slalom
18 February	13:00	Women's giant slalom
19 February	11:00	Men's giant slalom
19 February	14:30	Men's giant slalom
21 February	16:45	Women's slalom
21 February	20:15	Women's slalom
22 February	16:45	Men's slalom
22 February	20:15	Men's slalom

=== Course information ===
Date	Race	Start elevation	Finish elevation	Vertical drop	Course length	Average gradient
Sun 9 Feb	Downhill – men	2,045 m (6,709 ft)	970 m (3,182 ft)	1,075 m (3,527 ft)	3.495 km (2.172 mi)	30.8%
Wed 12 Feb	Downhill – women	1,755 m (5,758 ft)	965 m (3,166 ft)	790 m (2,592 ft)	2.713 km (1.686 mi)	29.1%
Fri 14 Feb	Downhill – (SC) – men	1,947 m (6,388 ft)	970 m (3,182 ft)	977 m (3,205 ft)	3.219 km (2.000 mi)	30.4%
Mon 10 Feb	Downhill – (SC) – women	1,755 m (5,758 ft)	965 m (3,166 ft)	790 m (2,592 ft)	2.713 km (1.686 mi)	29.1%
Sun 16 Feb	Super-G – men	1,592 m (5,223 ft)	970 m (3,182 ft)	622 m (2,041 ft)	2.096 km (1.302 mi)	29.7%
Sat 15 Feb	Super-G – women	1,580 m (5,184 ft)	965 m (3,166 ft)	615 m (2,018 ft)	2.100 km (1.305 mi)	29.3%
Wed 19 Feb	Giant slalom – men	1,370 m (4,495 ft)	960 m (3,150 ft)	410 m (1,345 ft)		
Tue 18 Feb	Giant slalom – women	1,365 m (4,478 ft)	965 m (3,166 ft)	400 m (1,312 ft)		
Sat 22 Feb	Slalom – men	1,160 m (3,806 ft)	960 m (3,150 ft)	200 m (656 ft)		
Fri 21 Feb	Slalom – women	1,160 m (3,806 ft)	960 m (3,150 ft)	200 m (656 ft)		
Fri 14 Feb	Slalom – (SC) – men	1,160 m (3,806 ft)	960 m (3,150 ft)	200 m (656 ft)		
Mon 10 Feb	Slalom – (SC) – women	1,160 m (3,806 ft)	960 m (3,150 ft)	200 m (656 ft)		

== Medal summary ==
Several age records in alpine skiing were set at these Olympic Games:

- Bode Miller, age 36, became the oldest medalist in Olympic alpine skiing; bronze in super-G.
- Mikaela Shiffrin, age 18, became the youngest champion in slalom in Olympic alpine skiing; gold in slalom.
- Mario Matt, age 34, became the oldest champion in Olympic alpine skiing; gold in slalom.
- Henrik Kristoffersen, age 19, became the youngest male medalist in Olympic alpine skiing; bronze in slalom.

=== Medal table ===
Rank	Nation	Gold	Silver	Bronze	Total
1	Austria	3	4	2	9
2	United States	2	1	2	5
3	Switzerland	2	0	1	3
4	Slovenia	2	0	0	2
5	Germany	1	1	1	3
6	Norway	1	0	2	3
7	France	0	1	1	2
7	Italy	0	1	1	2
9	Croatia	0	1	0	1
10	Canada	0	0	1	1
Totals (10 entries)		11	9	11	31

=== Men's events ===
Event	Gold		Silver		Bronze	
Downhill	Matthias Mayer; Austria	2:06.23	Christof Innerhofer; Italy	2:06.29	Kjetil Jansrud; Norway	2:06.33
Super-G	Kjetil Jansrud; Norway	1:18.14	Andrew Weibrecht; United States	1:18.44	Jan Hudec; Canada; Bode Miller; United States	1:18.67
Giant slalom	Ted Ligety; United States	2:45.29	Steve Missillier; France	2:45.77	Alexis Pinturault; France	2:45.93
Slalom	Mario Matt; Austria	1:41.84	Marcel Hirscher; Austria	1:42.12	Henrik Kristoffersen; Norway	1:42.67
Combined	Sandro Viletta; Switzerland	2:45.20	Ivica Kostelić; Croatia	2:45.54	Christof Innerhofer; Italy	2:45.67

- Two bronze medals were awarded in the super-G.

=== Women's events ===
Event	Gold		Silver		Bronze	
Downhill	Tina Maze; Slovenia; Dominique Gisin; Switzerland	1:41.57	Not awarded		Lara Gut; Switzerland	1:41.67
Super-G	Anna Fenninger; Austria	1:25.52	Maria Höfl-Riesch; Germany	1:26.07	Nicole Hosp; Austria	1:26.18
Giant slalom	Tina Maze; Slovenia	2:36.87	Anna Fenninger; Austria	2:36.94	Viktoria Rebensburg; Germany	2:37.14
Slalom	Mikaela Shiffrin; United States	1:44.54	Marlies Schild; Austria	1:45.07	Kathrin Zettel; Austria	1:45.35
Combined	Maria Höfl-Riesch; Germany	2:34.62	Nicole Hosp; Austria	2:35.02	Julia Mancuso; United States	2:35.15

- Two gold medals were awarded in the downhill, the first-ever tie for gold in an Olympic alpine skiing event; no silver medal was awarded.

== Qualification ==
A maximum of 320 (later adjusted to 350 by the International Ski Federation) quota spots were available to athletes to compete at the games. A maximum of 22 athletes could be entered by a National Olympic Committee, with a maximum of 14 men or 14 women. There were two qualification standards for the games: an A standard and a B standard.

== Participating nations ==
327 athletes from 74 nations were scheduled to participate, with number of athletes in parentheses. Only 319 athletes competed in actual competition as the other 8 athletes suffered injuries during training. Four nations qualified for the Winter Olympics for the first time, and hence competed in alpine skiing for the first time as well: Malta, Timor-Leste, Togo and Zimbabwe. Both Venezuela and Thailand made their Olympic debuts in the sport. One of Thailand's skiers was world-renowned concert violinist "Vanessa-Mae" Vanakorn. India's athletes initially competed as Independent Olympic Participants, as the Indian Olympic Association was suspended by the International Olympic Committee, but the suspension had since been lifted.

- Albania (2)
- Andorra (4)
- Argentina (6)
- Armenia (1)
- Australia (5)
- Austria (22)
- Azerbaijan (2)
- Belarus (2)
- Bosnia and Herzegovina (3)
- Brazil (2)
- Bulgaria (4)
- Canada (15)
- Cayman Islands (1)
- Chile (3)
- China (2)
- Croatia (8)
- Cyprus (2)
- Czech Republic (8)
- Denmark (1)
- Estonia (2)
- Finland (4)
- France (19)
- Germany (7)
- Georgia (3)
- Great Britain (2)
- Greece (3)
- Hungary (3)
- Iceland (4)
- India (1)
- Iran (3)
- Ireland (2)
- Israel (2)
- Italy (19)
- Japan (2)
- Kazakhstan (4)
- Kyrgyzstan (1)
- Latvia (5)
- Lebanon (2)
- Liechtenstein (3)
- Lithuania (2)
- Macedonia (1)
- Malta (1)
- Mexico (1)
- Moldova (1)
- Monaco (3)
- Montenegro (2)
- Morocco (2)
- New Zealand (1)
- Norway (10)
- Pakistan (1)
- Peru (2)
- Poland (6)
- Portugal (2)
- Romania (3)
- Russia (9)
- San Marino (2)
- Serbia (2)
- Slovakia (9)
- Slovenia (8)
- South Korea (5)
- Spain (5)
- Sweden (12)
- Switzerland (21)
- Tajikistan (1)
- Thailand (2)
- Timor-Leste (1)
- Togo (1)
- Turkey (2)
- Ukraine (2)
- United States (20)
- Uzbekistan (2)
- Venezuela (1)
- Virgin Islands (1)
- Zimbabwe (1)
