= Speed skating at the 2010 Winter Olympics – Women's 3000 metres =

Women's 3000 metres at the XXI Olympic Winter Games
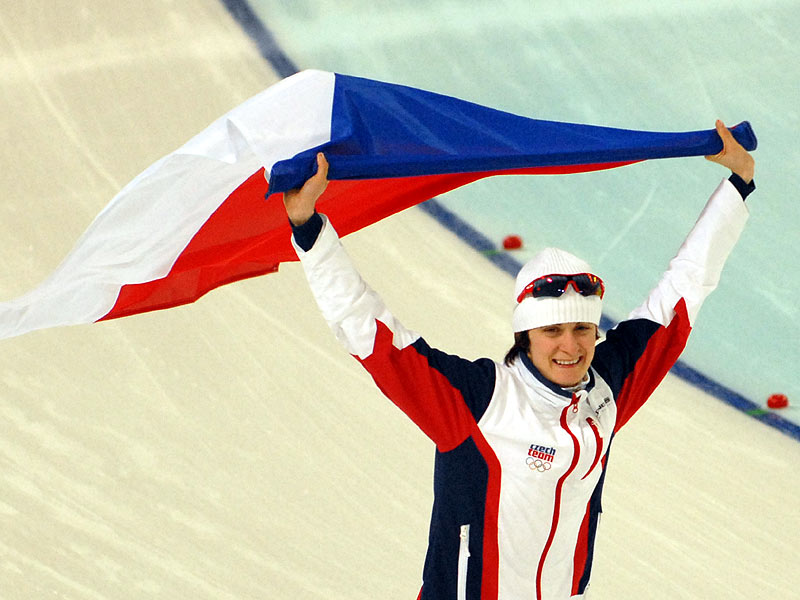
- Gold medal winner Martina Sablikova
- Venue: Richmond Olympic Oval
- Date: 14 February 2010
- Competitors: 28 from 13 nations
- Winning time: 4:02.53

Medalists
1st place, gold medalist(s)		Martina Sáblíková	Czech Republic
2nd place, silver medalist(s)		Stephanie Beckert	Germany
3rd place, bronze medalist(s)		Kristina Groves	Canada

The women's 3000 metres speed skating competition of the Vancouver 2010 Olympics was held at Richmond Olympic Oval on 14 February 2010.

== Records ==
Prior to this competition, the existing world and Olympic records were as follows.

World record	Cindy Klassen (CAN)	3:53.34	Calgary, Canada	18 March 2006
Olympic record	Claudia Pechstein (GER)	3:57.70	Salt Lake City, United States	20 February 2002

No new world or Olympic records were set during this competition.

== Results ==
Rank	Pair	Lane	Name	Country	Time	Time Behind	Notes
1st place, gold medalist(s)	11	o	Martina Sáblíková	Czech Republic	4:02.53	0.00	TR
2nd place, silver medalist(s)	13	o	Stephanie Beckert	Germany	4:04.62	+2.09	
3rd place, bronze medalist(s)	13	i	Kristina Groves	Canada	4:04.84	+2.31	
4	14	o	Daniela Anschütz-Thoms	Germany	4:04.87	+2.34	
5	12	o	Clara Hughes	Canada	4:06.01	+3.48	
6	11	i	Masako Hozumi	Japan	4:07.36	+4.83	
7	14	i	Ireen Wüst	Netherlands	4:08.09	+5.56	
8	12	i	Maren Haugli	Norway	4:10.01	+7.48	
9	8	o	Nancy Swider-Peltz, Jr	United States	4:11.16	+8.63	
10	8	i	Renate Groenewold	Netherlands	4:11.25	+8.72	
11	4	i	Diane Valkenburg	Netherlands	4:11.71	+9.18	
12	9	i	Jilleanne Rookard	United States	4:13.05	+10.52	
13	9	o	Katrin Mattscherodt	Germany	4:13.72	+11.19	
14	10	o	Cindy Klassen	Canada	4:15.53	+13.00	
15	7	i	Shiho Ishizawa	Japan	4:15.62	+13.09	
16	3	o	Anna Rokita	Austria	4:16.42	+13.89	
17	10	i	Catherine Raney-Norman	United States	4:16.59	+14.06	
18	3	i	Svetlana Vysokova	Russia	4:16.91	+14.38	
19	2	o	Noh Seon-Yeong	South Korea	4:17.36	+14.83	
20	2	i	Galina Likhachova	Russia	4:17.63	+15.10	
21	4	o	Eri Natori	Japan	4:18.18	+15.65	
22	7	o	Wang Fei	China	4:18.42	+15.89	
23	5	i	Lee Ju-Youn	South Korea	4:18.87	+16.34	
24	5	o	Luiza Złotkowska	Poland	4:19.13	+16.60	
25	6	o	Fu Chunyan	China	4:20.62	+18.09	
26	1	i	Park Do-Yeong	South Korea	4:20.92	+18.39	
27	6	i	Cathrine Grage	Denmark	4:20.93	+18.40	
28	1	o	Katarzyna Woźniak	Poland	4:22.35	+19.82	
