= Poland at the 2010 Winter Olympics =

- IOC code: POL
- NOC: Polish Olympic Committee
- Website: www.pkol.pl (in Polish)

in Vancouver
- Competitors: 47 in 11 sports
- Flag bearers: Konrad Niedźwiedzki (opening); Katarzyna Bachleda-Curuś (closing)
- Medals Ranked 15th: Gold 1 Silver 3 Bronze 2 Total 6

Winter Olympics appearances (overview)
- 1924; 1928; 1932; 1936; 1948; 1952; 1956; 1960; 1964; 1968; 1972; 1976; 1980; 1984; 1988; 1992; 1994; 1998; 2002; 2006; 2010; 2014; 2018; 2022; 2026

Poland participated at the 2010 Winter Olympics from 12 to 28 February 2010 held in Vancouver, British Columbia, Canada.

== Medalists ==
| Medal | Name | Sport | Event | Date |
|---|---|---|---|---|
| Gold | Justyna Kowalczyk | Cross-country skiing | Women's 30 km classical | 27 February |
| Silver | Adam Małysz | Ski jumping | Normal hill individual | 13 February |
| Silver | Justyna Kowalczyk | Cross-country skiing | Women's sprint | 17 February |
| Silver | Adam Małysz | Ski jumping | Large hill individual | 20 February |
| Bronze | Justyna Kowalczyk | Cross-country skiing | Women's 15 km pursuit | 19 February |
| Bronze | Katarzyna Bachleda-Curuś; Katarzyna Woźniak; Luiza Złotkowska | Speed skating | Women's team pursuit | 27 February |

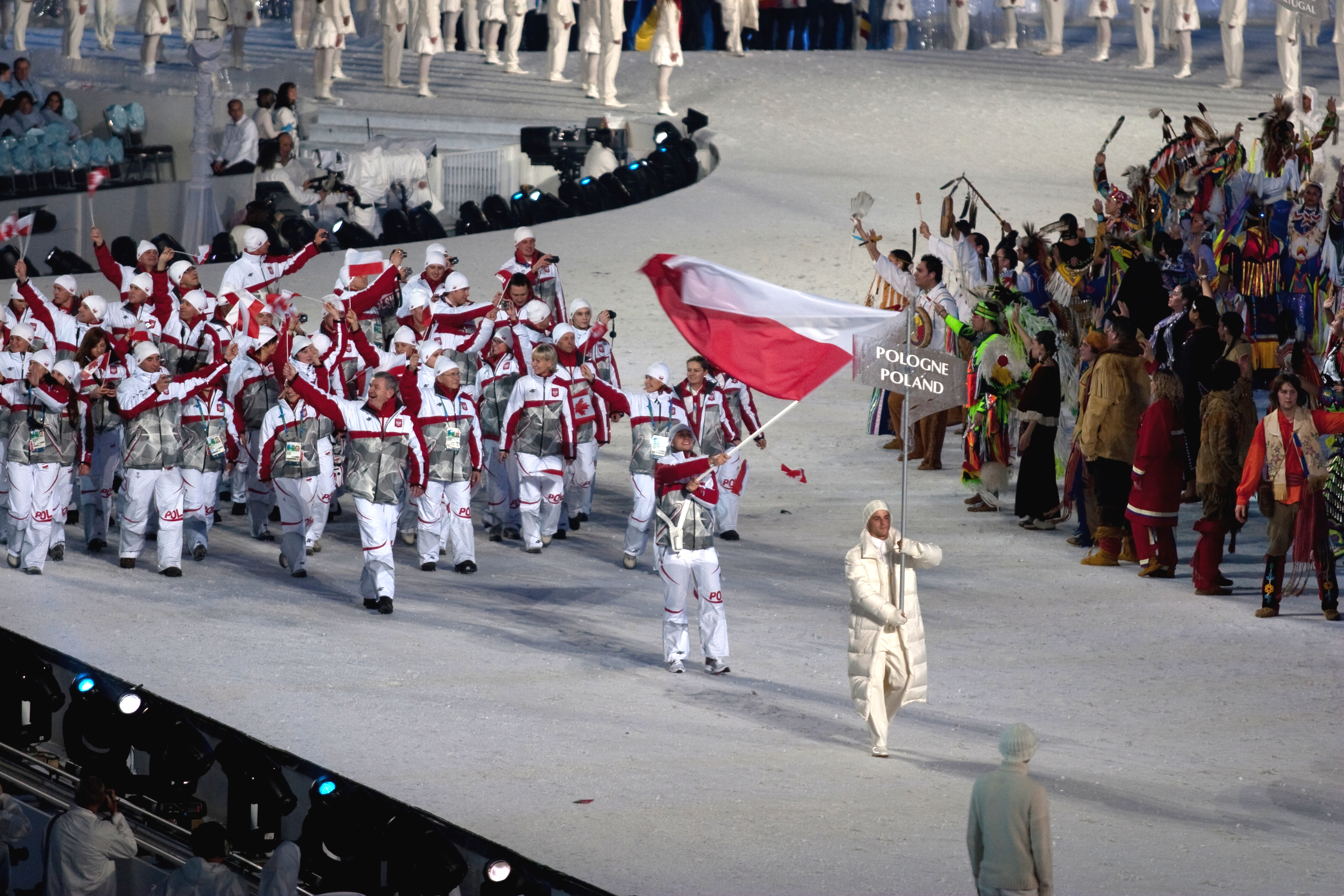
The athletes entering the stadium during the opening ceremonies.

== Alpine skiing ==
| Athlete | Event | Final | | | |
| Athlete | Event | Run 1 | Run 2 | Total | Rank |
|---|---|---|---|---|---|
| Agnieszka Gąsienica-Daniel | Women's downhill | | | 1:55.10 | 32 |
| Agnieszka Gąsienica-Daniel | Women's combined | Downhill; 1:30.28 | Slalom; 45.96 | 2:16.24 | 25 |
| Agnieszka Gąsienica-Daniel | Women's super-G | | | 1:24.31 | 23 |
| Agnieszka Gąsienica-Daniel | Women's slalom | 57.06 | 55.13 | 1:52.19 | 35 |
| Agnieszka Gąsienica-Daniel | Women's giant slalom | DNF | | | DNF |

== Biathlon ==
Men

| Athlete | Event | Final | | |
| Athlete | Event | Time | Misses | Rank |
|---|---|---|---|---|
| Tomasz Sikora | Sprint | 26:16.2 | 2 | 29 |
| Tomasz Sikora | Pursuit | 35:14.3 | 3 | 18 |
| Tomasz Sikora | Individual | 49:43.8 | 2 | 7 |
| Tomasz Sikora | Mass start | 36:13.1 | 3 | 11 |
| Łukasz Szczurek | Sprint | 29:02.0 | 2 | 85 |
| Łukasz Szczurek | Individual | 54:36.7 | 3 | 59 |

Women

| Athlete | Event | Final | | |
| Athlete | Event | Time | Misses | Rank |
|---|---|---|---|---|
| Agnieszka Cyl | Sprint | 21:55.2 | 0 | 42 |
| Agnieszka Cyl | Pursuit | 33:08.4 | 1 | 25 |
| Agnieszka Cyl | Individual | 42:32.5 | 1 | 7 |
| Agnieszka Cyl | Mass start | 37:54.7 | 5 | 23 |
| Magdalena Gwizdoń | Sprint | 21:48.5 | 0 | 35 |
| Magdalena Gwizdoń | Pursuit | 33:45.8 | 2 | 31 |
| Magdalena Gwizdoń | Individual | 46:46.7 | 4 | 59 |
| Magdalena Gwizdoń | Mass start | DNS | | |
| Weronika Nowakowska | Sprint | 21:49.4 | 3 | 36 |
| Weronika Nowakowska | Pursuit | 33:24.2 | 2 | 28 |
| Weronika Nowakowska | Individual | 41:57.5 | 1 | 5 |
| Weronika Nowakowska | Mass start | 37:34.0 | 4 | 21 |
| Krystyna Pałka | Sprint | 20:54.3 | 0 | 21 |
| Krystyna Pałka | Pursuit | 33:07.6 | 2 | 24 |
| Krystyna Pałka | Individual | 43:09.6 | 1 | 15 |
| Krystyna Pałka | Mass start | 37:22.6 | 1 | 20 |

Women's relay

| Athlete | Event | Final | | |
| Athlete | Event | Time | Misses | Rank |
|---|---|---|---|---|
| Krystyna Pałka; Magdalena Gwizdoń; Weronika Nowakowska; Agnieszka Cyl | 4 x 6 km relay | 1:12:54.3 | 13 | 12 |

Paulina Bobak was a member of the biathlon team, but did not participate in any event.

== Bobsleigh ==
| Athlete | Event | Final | | | | | |
| Athlete | Event | Run 1 | Run 2 | Run 3 | Run 4 | Total | Rank |
|---|---|---|---|---|---|---|---|
| Dawid Kupczyk; Marcin Niewiara | Two-man | 52.45 | 52.91 | 52.42 | 52.72 | 3:30.50 | 16 |
| Dawid Kupczyk; Paweł Mróz; Marcin Niewiara; Michał Zblewski | Four-man | 51.94 | 51.96 | 52.32 | 52.28 | 3:28.53 | 14 |

== Cross-country skiing ==
Men

| Athlete | Event | Qualifying | | Quarterfinals | | Semifinals | | Final | |
| Athlete | Event | Total | Rank | Total | Rank | Total | Rank | Total | Rank |
|---|---|---|---|---|---|---|---|---|---|
| Maciej Kreczmer | 15 km freestyle | | | | | | | 37:38.0 | 66 |
| Maciej Kreczmer | Sprint | 3:41.35 | 28 Q | 3:39.6 | 5 | did not advance | | | |
| Janusz Krężelok | Sprint | 3:41.34 | 27 Q | 3:41.1 | 6 | did not advance | | | |

Women

| Athlete | Event | Qualifying | | Quarterfinals | | Semifinals | | Final | |
| Athlete | Event | Total | Rank | Total | Rank | Total | Rank | Total | Rank |
|---|---|---|---|---|---|---|---|---|---|
| Sylwia Jaśkowiec | 10 km freestyle | | | | | | | 26:37.2 | 28 |
| Sylwia Jaśkowiec | 15 km pursuit | | | | | | | 42:54.8 | 34 |
| Sylwia Jaśkowiec | 30 km classical | | | | | | | 1:34:59.1 | 25 |
| Justyna Kowalczyk | 10 km freestyle | | | | | | | 25:20.1 | 5 |
| Justyna Kowalczyk | 15 km pursuit | | | | | | | 21:02.2 | 3rd place, bronze medalist(s) |
| Justyna Kowalczyk | Sprint | 3:43.35 | 5 Q | 3:38.8 | 1 Q | 3:38.0 | 1 Q | 3:40.3 | 2nd place, silver medalist(s) |
| Justyna Kowalczyk | 30 km classical | | | | | | | 1:30:33.7 | 1st place, gold medalist(s) |
| Paulina Maciuszek | 10 km freestyle | | | | | | | 27:22.1 | 45 |
| Paulina Maciuszek | 15 km pursuit | | | | | | | 44:56.6 | 52 |
| Paulina Maciuszek | 30 km classical | | | | | | | 1:36:31.7 | 29 |
| Kornelia Marek | 10 km freestyle | | | | | | | 27:12.16 | 39 |
| Kornelia Marek | 15 km pursuit | | | | | | | 42:56.9 | 35 |
| Kornelia Marek | 30 km classical | | | | | | | 1:33:15.4 | 11 |
| Kornelia Marek; Justyna Kowalczyk; Paulina Maciuszek; Sylwia Jaśkowiec | 4 x 5 kilometre relay | | | | | | | 56:29.4 | DQ (6) |

== Figure skating ==
Poland has qualified 1 entrant in men's singles, 1 in ladies singles, and 1 in pair skating, for a total of 4 athletes.

| Athlete(s) | Event | CD | | SP/OD | | FS/FD | | Total | |
| Athlete(s) | Event | Points | Rank | Points | Rank | Points | Rank | Points | Rank |
|---|---|---|---|---|---|---|---|---|---|
| Przemysław Domański | Men | | | 52.14 | 28 | Did not advance to free skate | | | |
| Anna Jurkiewicz | Ladies' | | | 36.10 | 30 | Did not advance to free skate | | | |
| Joanna Sulej / Mateusz Chruściński | Pairs | | | 39.30 | 20 | 86.52 | 18 | 125.82 | 18 |

== Freestyle skiing ==
Ski cross

| Athlete | Event | Qualifying | | 1/8 finals | Quarterfinals | Semifinals | Finals | |
| Athlete | Event | Time | Rank | Position | Position | Position | Position | Rank |
|---|---|---|---|---|---|---|---|---|
| Karolina Riemen | Women's ski cross | 1:21.36 | 26 Q | 2 Q | 3 | did not advance | | 16 |

== Luge ==
| Athlete | Event | Final | | | | | |
| Athlete | Event | Run 1 | Run 2 | Run 3 | Run 4 | Total | Rank |
|---|---|---|---|---|---|---|---|
| Maciej Kurowski | Men's singles | 49.427 | 49.200 | 49.361 | 49.039 | 3:17.027 | 23 |
| Ewelina Staszulonek | Women's singles | 41.975 | 41.816 | 41.948 | 41.882 | 2:47.621 | 8 |

== Short track speed skating ==
| Athlete | Event | Heat | | Quarterfinal | | Semifinal | | Final | |
| Athlete | Event | Time | Rank | Time | Rank | Time | Rank | Time | Rank |
|---|---|---|---|---|---|---|---|---|---|
| Jakub Jaworski | Men's 1500 metres | 2:19.163 | 4 | | | did not advance | | | |
| Paula Bzura | Women's 1000 metres | 1:31.338 | 2 Q | 1:32.662 | 4 | did not advance | | | |
| Paula Bzura | Women's 1500 metres | DSQ | DSQ | | | did not advance | | | |
| Patrycja Maliszewska | Women's 500 metres | 58.649 | 4 | did not advance | | | | | |
| Patrycja Maliszewska | Women's 1500 metres | 2:25.586 | 4 | | | did not advance | | | |

== Ski jumping ==
Men

| Athlete | Event | Qualifying | | First Round | | Final | | |
| Athlete | Event | Points | Rank | Points | Rank | Points | Total | Rank |
|---|---|---|---|---|---|---|---|---|
| Stefan Hula | Normal hill | 125.5 | 17 Q | 112.5 | 31 | did not advance | | |
| Stefan Hula | Large hill | 127.6 | 14 Q | 106.5 | 20 Q | 110.7 | 217.2 | 19 |
| Adam Małysz | Normal hill | Prequalified | | 132.5 | 3 Q | 137.0 | 269.5 | 2nd place, silver medalist(s) |
| Adam Małysz | Large hill | Prequalified | | 138.1 | 2 Q | 131.3 | 269.4 | 2nd place, silver medalist(s) |
| Krzysztof Miętus | Normal hill | 126.5 | 15 Q | 109.0 | 36 | did not advance | | |
| Krzysztof Miętus | Large hill | 127.0 | 16 Q | 84.7 | 36 | did not advance | | |
| Kamil Stoch | Normal hill | 127.5 | 12 Q | 118.5 | 22 Q | 113.5 | 232.0 | 27 |
| Kamil Stoch | Large hill | 125.3 | 17 'Q | 114.3 | 13 Q | 109.8 | 224.1 | 14 |
| Stefan Hula; Łukasz Rutkowski; Kamil Stoch; Adam Małysz | Large hill team | | | 484.0; 122.2; 108.4; 116.2; 137.2 | 6 Q | 512.7; 118.5; 118.5; 132.6; 143.1 | 996.7 | 6 |

== Snowboarding ==
Halfpipe

| Athlete | Event | Qualification | | Round of 16 | Quarterfinals | Semifinals | Finals | |
| Athlete | Event | Points | Rank | Points | Points | Points | Points | Rank |
|---|---|---|---|---|---|---|---|---|
| Michał Ligocki | Men's halfpipe | 11.1 | 19 | did not advance | | | | |
| Paulina Ligocka | Women's halfpipe | 11.1 | 28 | did not advance | | | | |

Snowboard Cross

| Athlete | Event | Qualifying | | Round of 16 | Quarterfinals | Semifinals | Finals |
| Athlete | Event | Time | Rank | Rank | Rank | Rank | Rank |
|---|---|---|---|---|---|---|---|
| Maciej Jodko | Men's snowboard cross | 1:24.11 | 27 Q | 28 | did not advance | | |
| Mateusz Ligocki | Men's snowboard cross | 1:24.11 | 28 Q | 29 | did not advance | | |

== Speed skating ==
Men

| Athlete | Event | Race 1 | | Race 2 | | Final | |
| Athlete | Event | Time | Rank | Time | Rank | Time | Rank |
|---|---|---|---|---|---|---|---|
| Maciej Biega | 500 metres | 36.642 | 38 | 37.934 | 38 | 74.57 | 38 |
| Zbigniew Bródka | 1500 metres | | | | | 1:49.45 | 27 |
| Sławomir Chmura | 5000 metres | | | | | 6:33.20 | 16 |
| Sebastian Druszkiewicz | 5000 metres | | | | | DNS | |
| Sebastian Druszkiewicz | 10000 metres | | | | | 13:49.31 | 14 |
| Konrad Niedźwiedzki | 500 metres | 36.183 | 33 | 36.179 | 30 | 72.36 | 31 |
| Konrad Niedźwiedzki | 1000 metres | | | | | 1:11.24 | 27 |
| Konrad Niedźwiedzki | 1500 metres | | | | | 1:48.15 | 17 |
| Maciej Ustynowicz | 500 metres | 35.596 | 22 | 35.753 | 22 | 71.35 | 22 |
| Maciej Ustynowicz | 1000 metres | | | | | 1:12.10 | 32 |

Women

| Athlete | Event | Final | |
| Athlete | Event | Time | Rank |
|---|---|---|---|
| Katarzyna Bachleda-Curuś | 1000 metres | 1:19.00 | 31 |
| Katarzyna Bachleda-Curuś | 1500 metres | 1:59.53 | 15 |
| Natalia Czerwonka | 1500 metres | 2:05.00 | 36 |
| Katarzyna Woźniak | 3000 metres | 4:22.35 | 28 |
| Luiza Złotkowska | 1500 metres | 2:04.01 | 34 |
| Luiza Złotkowska | 3000 metres | 4:19.13 | 24 |

Team Pursuit

| Athlete | Event | Quarterfinal | Semifinal | Final | |
| Athlete | Event | Opposition Time | Opposition Time | Opposition Time | Rank |
|---|---|---|---|---|---|
| Katarzyna Bachleda-Curuś, Luiza Złotkowska, Katarzyna Woźniak | Women's team pursuit | Russia; W 3:04.86 | Japan; L 3:02.73 | Final B United States; W 3:05.30 | Bronze |
