= Speed skating at the 2010 Winter Olympics =

Speed skating at the XXI Olympic Winter Games
- Venue: Richmond Olympic Oval
- Dates: 13–27 February 2010
- No. of events: 12
- Competitors: 177 from 24 nations

Speed skating at the 2010 Winter Olympics was held at the Richmond Olympic Oval, Richmond, British Columbia, between 13 and 27 February 2010.

== Notes ==
Haralds Silovs became the first athlete in Olympic history to participate in both short track (1500 m) and long track (5000 m) speed skating, and the first to compete in two different disciplines on the same day. He competed in the 5000 m and then raced across town to the 1500 m event. The low altitude of Vancouver and high humidity inside the Richmond Olympic Oval, set just 3 metres above the sea, contributed to the fact that no world records in speed skating were set at these Games.

== Medal summary ==
=== Medal table ===
Rank	Nation	Gold	Silver	Bronze	Total
1	South Korea	3	2	0	5
2	Netherlands	3	1	3	7
3	Canada	2	1	2	5
4	Czech Republic	2	0	1	3
5	Germany	1	3	0	4
6	United States	1	2	1	4
7	Japan	0	2	1	3
8	Russia	0	1	1	2
9	China	0	0	1	1
9	Norway	0	0	1	1
9	Poland	0	0	1	1
Totals (11 entries)		12	12	12	36

=== Men's events ===
Event	Gold		Silver		Bronze	
500 metres	Mo Tae-bum; South Korea	69.82	Keiichiro Nagashima; Japan	69.98	Joji Kato; Japan	70.01
1000 metres	Shani Davis; United States	1:08.94	Mo Tae-bum; South Korea	1:09.12	Chad Hedrick; United States	1:09.32
1500 metres	Mark Tuitert; Netherlands	1:45.57	Shani Davis; United States	1:46.10	Håvard Bøkko; Norway	1:46.13
5000 metres	Sven Kramer; Netherlands	6:14.60 OR	Lee Seung-hoon; South Korea	6:16.95	Ivan Skobrev; Russia	6:18.05
10000 metres	Lee Seung-hoon; South Korea	12:58.55 OR	Ivan Skobrev; Russia	13:02.07	Bob de Jong; Netherlands	13:06.73
Team pursuit	Canada; Mathieu Giroux; Lucas Makowsky; Denny Morrison	3:41.37	United States; Brian Hansen; Chad Hedrick; Jonathan Kuck; Trevor Marsicano*	3:41.58	Netherlands; Jan Blokhuijsen; Sven Kramer; Simon Kuipers*; Mark Tuitert	3:39.95 OR

* Skaters who did not participate in the final, but received medals.

=== Women's events ===
Event	Gold		Silver		Bronze	
500 metres	Lee Sang-hwa; South Korea	76.09	Jenny Wolf; Germany	76.14	Wang Beixing; China	76.63
1000 metres	Christine Nesbitt; Canada	1:16.56	Annette Gerritsen; Netherlands	1:16.58	Laurine van Riessen; Netherlands	1:16.72
1500 metres	Ireen Wüst; Netherlands	1:56.89	Kristina Groves; Canada	1:57.14	Martina Sáblíková; Czech Republic	1:57.96
3000 metres	Martina Sáblíková; Czech Republic	4:02.53	Stephanie Beckert; Germany	4:04.62	Kristina Groves; Canada	4:04.84
5000 metres	Martina Sáblíková; Czech Republic	6:50.91	Stephanie Beckert; Germany	6:51.39	Clara Hughes; Canada	6:55.73
Team pursuit	Germany; Daniela Anschütz-Thoms; Stephanie Beckert; Anni Friesinger-Postma*; Katrin Mattscherodt	3:02.82	Japan; Masako Hozumi; Nao Kodaira; Maki Tabata	3:02.84	Poland; Katarzyna Bachleda-Curuś; Katarzyna Woźniak; Luiza Złotkowska	3:03.73

* Skater who did not participate in the final, but received a medal.

== Events ==
A total of twelve speed skating events were held at Vancouver 2010:

Men	Women
500 m	500 m
1000 m	1000 m
1500 m	1500 m
5000 m	3000 m
10000 m	5000 m
Team pursuit	Team pursuit

== Competition schedule ==
All times are Pacific Standard Time (UTC-8).

Day	Date	Start	Finish	Event	Phase
Day 2	Saturday, 13 February 2010	12:00	14:20	5000 m men	
Day 3	Sunday, 14 February 2010	13:00	14:50	3000 m women	
Day 4	Monday, 15 February 2010	15:30	18:50	500 m men	
Day 5	Tuesday, 16 February 2010	13:00	16:05	500 m women	
Day 6	Wednesday, 17 February 2010	16:00	17:30	1000 m men	
Day 7	Thursday, 18 February 2010	13:00	14:25	1000 m women	
Day 9	Saturday, 20 February 2010	16:15	18:00	1500 m men	
Day 10	Sunday, 21 February 2010	15:00	16:35	1500 m women	
Day 12	Tuesday, 23 February 2010	11:00	13:45	10000 m men	
Day 13	Wednesday, 24 February 2010	13:00	14:35	5000 m women	
Day 15	Friday, 26 February 2010	12:30	14:20	Team pursuit men	Heats
Day 15	Friday, 26 February 2010	12:30	14:20	Team pursuit women	Heats
Day 16	Saturday, 27 February 2010	12:30	14:25	Team pursuit men	Finals
Day 16	Saturday, 27 February 2010	12:30	14:25	Team pursuit women	Finals

== Qualification times ==
Event	Women	Men
500 m	39.50	36.00
1000 m	1:18.50	1:11.00
1500 m	2:00.00	1:49.00
3000 m	4:15.50	n.a.
5000 m	7:20.00 or 4:10.00 (3000 m)	6:35.00
10000 m	n.a.	13:30.00 or 6:30.00 (5000 m)

== Participating nations ==
A total of 177 athletes from 24 nations participated (the numbers of athletes are shown in parentheses).

- Australia (1)
- Austria (1)
- Belarus (1)
- Canada (15)
- China (14)
- Czech Republic (2)
- Denmark (1)
- Finland (4)
- France (2)
- Germany (13)
- Italy (5)
- Japan (19)
- Kazakhstan (4)
- Latvia (1)
- Netherlands (19)
- New Zealand (1)
- North Korea (1)
- Norway (8)
- Poland (10)
- Russia (17)
- South Korea (16)
- Sweden (3)
- Switzerland (1)
- United States (18)
