= Speed skating at the 2010 Winter Olympics – Women's 5000 metres =

Women's 5000 metres at the XXI Olympic Winter Games
- Venue: Richmond Olympic Oval
- Date: 24 February 2010
- Competitors: 16 from 9 nations
- Winning time: 6:50.92

Medalists
| 1st place, gold medalist(s) | | Martina Sáblíková | Czech Republic |
| 2nd place, silver medalist(s) | | Stephanie Beckert | Germany |
| 3rd place, bronze medalist(s) | | Clara Hughes | Canada |

The women's 5000 metres speed skating competition of the Vancouver 2010 Olympics was held at Richmond Olympic Oval on February 24, 2010.

== Records ==
Prior to this competition, the existing world and Olympic records were as follows.

| World record | Martina Sáblíková (CZE) | 6:45.61 | Salt Lake City, United States | 11 March 2007 |
| Olympic record | Claudia Pechstein (GER) | 6:46.91 | Salt Lake City, United States | 23 February 2002 |

== Results ==
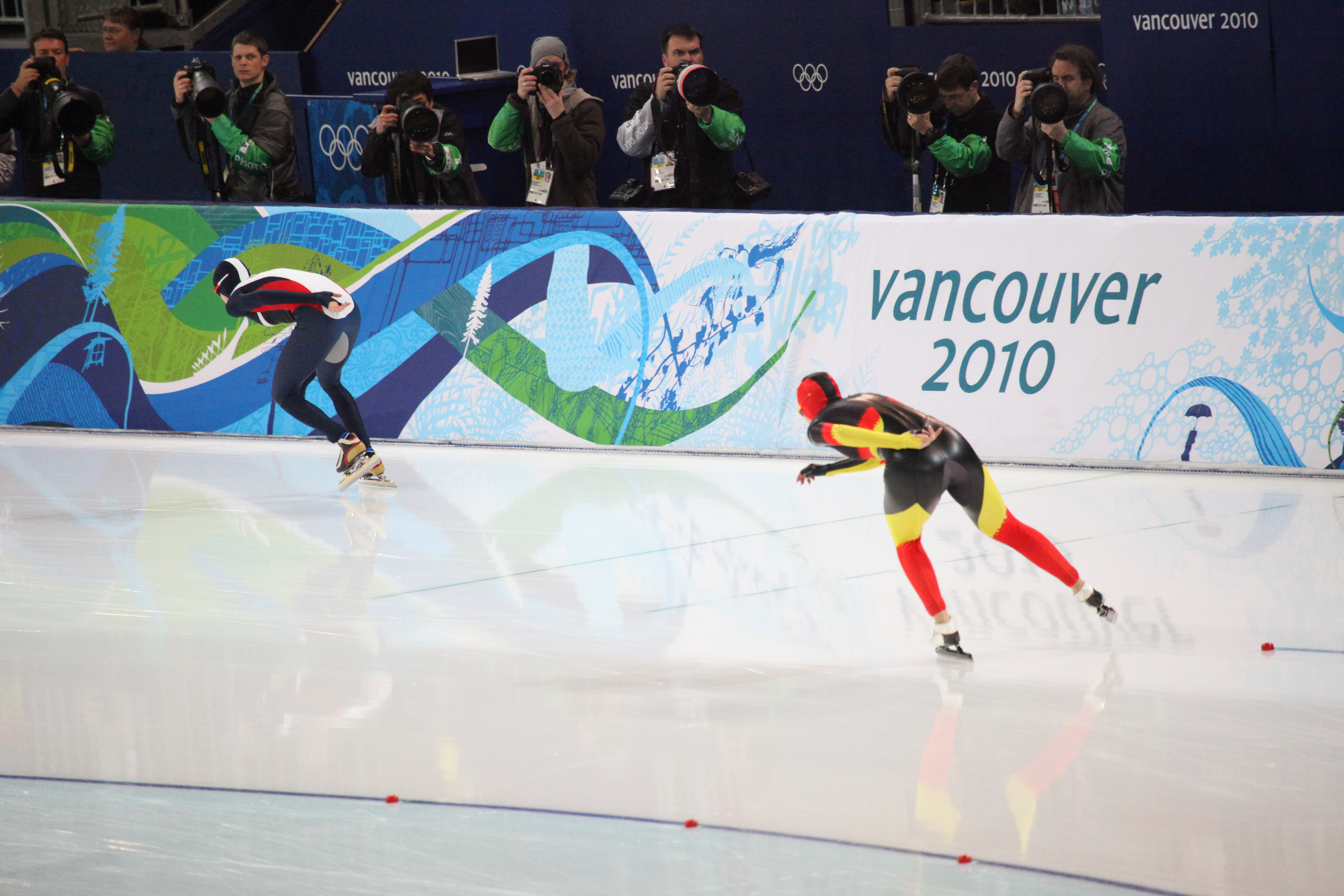
Martina Sáblíková (CZE - out) and Daniela Anschütz-Thoms (GER - in) in the final 8th pair of the 5000m race.

| Rank | Pair | Lane | Name | Country | Time | Time Behind | Notes |
|---|---|---|---|---|---|---|---|
| 1st place, gold medalist(s) | 8 | i | Martina Sáblíková | Czech Republic | 6:50.91 | 0.00 | TR |
| 2nd place, silver medalist(s) | 7 | i | Stephanie Beckert | Germany | 6:51.39 | +0.47 | |
| 3rd place, bronze medalist(s) | 5 | o | Clara Hughes | Canada | 6:55.73 | +4.81 | |
| 4 | 8 | o | Daniela Anschütz-Thoms | Germany | 6:58.64 | +7.72 | |
| 5 | 6 | o | Maren Haugli | Norway | 7:02.19 | +11.27 | |
| 6 | 7 | o | Kristina Groves | Canada | 7:04.57 | +13.65 | |
| 7 | 5 | i | Masako Hozumi | Japan | 7:04.97 | +14.05 | |
| 8 | 3 | i | Jilleanne Rookard | United States | 7:07.48 | +16.56 | |
| 9 | 6 | i | Shiho Ishizawa | Japan | 7:12.23 | +21.31 | |
| 10 | 2 | i | Jorien Voorhuis | Netherlands | 7:13.27 | +22.35 | |
| 11 | 4 | i | Elma de Vries | Netherlands | 7:16.68 | +25.76 | |
| 12 | 1 | o | Cindy Klassen | Canada | 7:22.09 | +31.17 | |
| 13 | 2 | o | Svetlana Vysokova | Russia | 7:23.33 | +32.41 | |
| 14 | 4 | o | Cathrine Grage | Denmark | 7:23.83 | +32.91 | |
| 15 | 1 | i | Maria Lamb | United States | 7:25.15 | +34.23 | |
| | 3 | o | Katrin Mattscherodt | Germany | DSQ | | |
