= Oh Min-ji =

South Korean speed skater

Personal information
- Nationality: South Korean
- Born: 29 March 1985 (age 39); Seoul, South Korea

Sport
- Sport: Speed skating

Oh Min-ji (born 29 March 1985) is a South Korean speed skater. She competed in the women's 500 metres at the 2010 Winter Olympics.
