= Speed skating at the 2010 Winter Olympics – Men's 500 metres =

Men's 500 metres at the XXI Olympic Winter Games
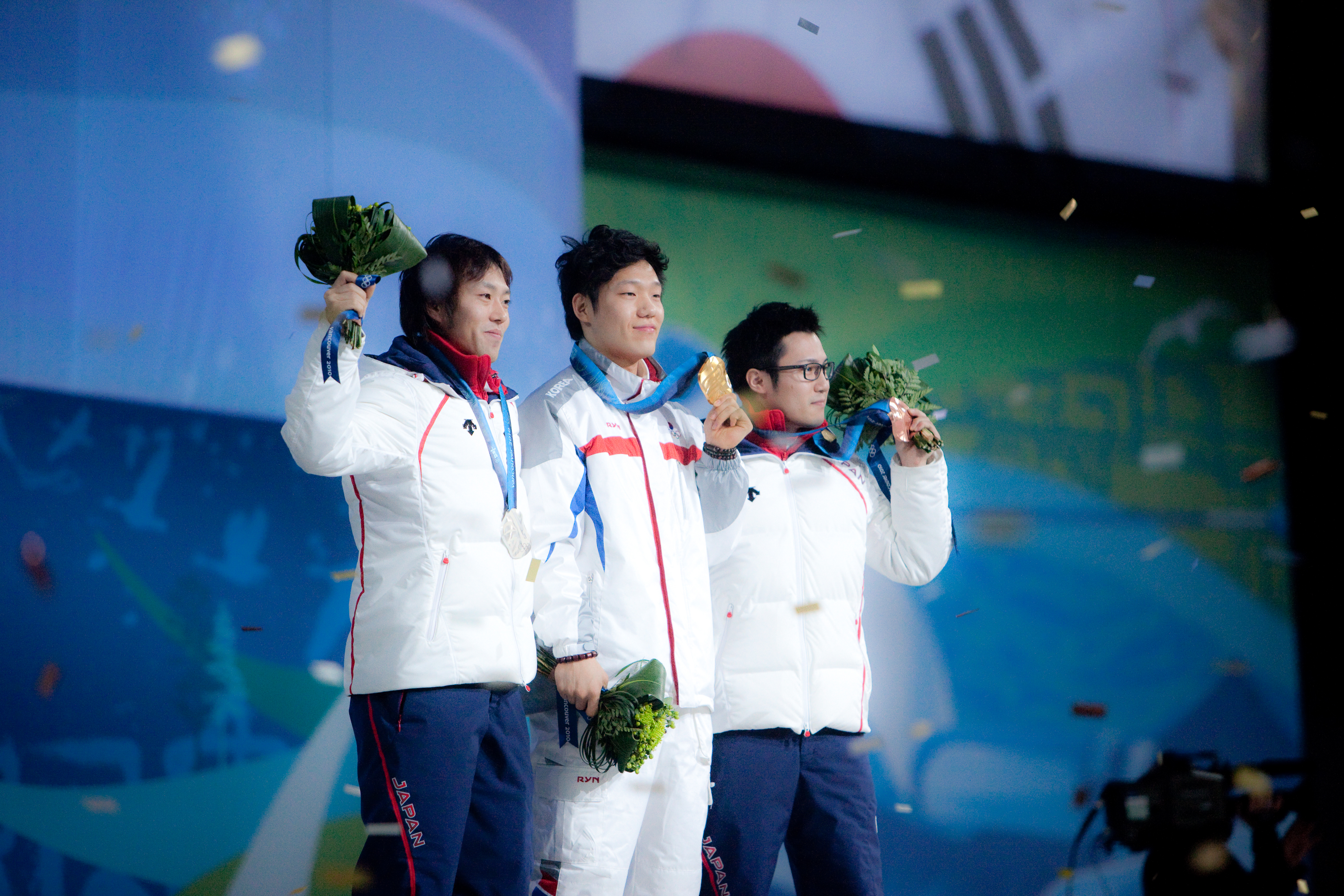
- Keiichiro Nagashima, Mo Tae-bum, Joji Kato
- Venue: Richmond Olympic Oval
- Date: 15 February 2010
- Competitors: 39 from 12 nations
- Winning time: 69.82

Medalists
1st place, gold medalist(s)		Mo Tae-bum	South Korea
2nd place, silver medalist(s)		Keiichiro Nagashima	Japan
3rd place, bronze medalist(s)		Joji Kato	Japan

The men's 500 metres speed skating competition of the Vancouver 2010 Olympics was held at Richmond Olympic Oval on 15 February 2010.

== Track maintenance issues ==
Competition was stopped for approximately ninety minutes during the first run, due to concerns over the naturally deteriorating quality of the ice after so many skaters had raced on it and the seeming inability of resurfacing equipment to do anything about it. The two ice resurfacing machines prepared to maintain the surface of the ice track both malfunctioned. A reserve machine was employed, but it left the ice surface too rough and pitted to permit safe racing by the athletes. Finally, one of the original two machines was repaired sufficiently to fix the track. Said Arie Koops, director of Dutch speed skating of the delay and who felt that the third machine wasn't properly prepared, "When skaters are not prepared for a race you don't send them out. It should be the same with the resurfacing machine. If one machine was broken, they should have prepared the third. It was standing there in the garage. I have never seen anything like this." A Zamboni brand resurfacer is being brought in from Calgary for the remainder of the games. American skater Shani Davis withdrew from the event, citing fatigue.

== Records ==
Prior to this competition, the existing world and Olympic records were as follows.

500 meters (1 race)

World record	Jeremy Wotherspoon (CAN)	34.03	Salt Lake City, United States	9 November 2007
Olympic record	Casey FitzRandolph (USA)	34.42	Salt Lake City, United States	11 February 2002

500 meters x 2 (2 races)

World record	Jeremy Wotherspoon (CAN)	68.310	Calgary, Canada	15 March 2008
Olympic record	Casey FitzRandolph (USA)	69.230	Salt Lake City, United States	11 February 2002

No new world or Olympic records were set during this competition. The track records of 34.80 s and 69.73 s set by Lee Kang-seok on 15 March 2009 were also not broken.

== Results ==
Rank	Name	Country	Pair	Lane	Race 1	Rank	Pair	Lane	Race 2	Rank	Total	Time behind
1st place, gold medalist(s)	Mo Tae-bum	South Korea	13	i	34.923	2	19	o	34.906	2	69.82	0.00
2nd place, silver medalist(s)	Keiichiro Nagashima	Japan	19	i	35.108	6	17	o	34.876	1	69.98	+0.16
3rd place, bronze medalist(s)	Joji Kato	Japan	17	o	34.937	3	20	i	35.076	5	70.01	+0.19
4	Lee Kang-seok	South Korea	17	i	35.053	4	18	o	34.988	3	70.041	+0.22
5	Mika Poutala	Finland	18	i	34.863	1	20	o	35.181	11	70.044	+0.22
6	Jan Smeekens	Netherlands	13	o	35.160	12	15	i	35.051	4	70.21	+0.39
7	Yu Fengtong	China	15	i	35.116	7	16	o	35.120	7	70.23	+0.41
8	Jamie Gregg	Canada	16	o	35.142	9	17	i	35.126	8	70.26	+0.44
9	Jeremy Wotherspoon	Canada	12	o	35.094	5	19	i	35.188	12	70.282	+0.46
10	Zhang Zhongqi	China	16	i	35.175	14	14	o	35.113	6	70.288	+0.46
11	Ronald Mulder	Netherlands	20	i	35.155	11	15	o	35.146	10	70.30	+0.48
12	Tucker Fredricks	United States	20	o	35.218	15	13	i	35.138	9	70.35	+0.53
13	Yūya Oikawa	Japan	18	o	35.174	13	14	i	35.254	14	70.42	+0.60
14	Dmitry Lobkov	Russia	9	o	35.133	8	18	i	35.335	15	70.46	+0.64
15	Lee Kyou-hyuk	South Korea	19	o	35.145	10	16	i	35.344	16	70.48	+0.66
16	Mike Ireland	Canada	9	i	35.386	17	13	o	35.253	13	70.63	+0.81
17	Akio Ohta	Japan	15	o	35.315	16	12	i	35.347	17	70.66	+0.84
18	Nico Ihle	Germany	2	o	35.532	19	11	i	35.539	18	71.07	+1.25
19	Mun Jun	South Korea	14	i	35.552	20	12	o	35.640	19	71.19	+1.37
20	Simon Kuipers	Netherlands	11	i	35.662	23	11	o	35.669	20	71.33	+1.51
21	Kyle Parrott	Canada	11	o	35.577	21	10	i	35.767	23	71.344	+1.52
22	Maciej Ustynowicz	Poland	10	o	35.596	22	9	i	35.753	22	71.349	+1.52
23	Samuel Schwarz	Germany	3	o	35.795	24	8	i	35.715	21	71.51	+1.69
24	Ermanno Ioriatti	Italy	10	i	35.957	29	8	o	35.842	24	71.79	+1.97
25	Wang Nan	China	5	o	35.915	26	7	i	35.928	25	71.84	+2.02
26	Nick Pearson	United States	2	i	35.834	25	10	o	36.094	28	71.92	+2.10
27	Tuomas Nieminen	Finland	7	o	35.940	27	6	i	36.047	26	71.98	+2.15
28	Liu Fangyi	China	6	o	36.193	34	5	i	36.047	27	72.24	+2.42
29	Jan Bos	Netherlands	1	i	36.149	31	6	o	36.111	29	72.26	+2.44
30	Markus Puolakka	Finland	5	i	36.152	32	5	o	36.204	31	72.35	+2.53
31	Konrad Niedźwiedzki	Poland	6	i	36.183	33	4	o	36.179	30	72.36	+2.54
32	Aleksandr Lebedev	Russia	3	i	36.144	30	7	o	36.276	33	72.42	+2.60
33	Pekka Koskela	Finland	12	i	35.943	28	9	o	36.535	36	72.47	+2.65
34	Roman Krech	Kazakhstan	8	i	36.261	35	3	o	36.270	32	72.53	+2.71
35	Timofey Skopin	Russia	8	o	36.482	37	4	i	36.465	35	72.94	+3.12
36	Yevgeny Lalenkov	Russia	7	i	36.420	36	2	o	36.614	37	73.03	+3.21
37	Mitchell Whitmore	United States	4	i	36.734	39	1	o	36.314	34	73.04	+3.22
38	Maciej Biega	Poland	4	o	36.642	38	3	i	37.934	38	74.57	+4.75
	Shani Davis	United States	14	o	35.45	18			WD			
