= Germany at the 2010 Winter Olympics =

- IOC code: GER
- NOC: German Olympic Sports Confederation
- Website: www.dosb.de (in German, English, and French)

in Vancouver
- Competitors: 153 in 15 sports
- Flag bearers: André Lange (opening); Magdalena Neuner (closing)
- Medals Ranked 2nd: Gold 10 Silver 13 Bronze 7 Total 30

Winter Olympics appearances (overview)
- 1928; 1932; 1936; 1948; 1952; 1956–1988; 1992; 1994; 1998; 2002; 2006; 2010; 2014; 2018; 2022; 2026

Other related appearances
- United Team of Germany (1956–1964); East Germany (1968–1988); West Germany (1968–1988)

Germany participated at the 2010 Winter Olympics in Vancouver, British Columbia, Canada. 153 athletes represented Germany, entering all 15 sports. Figure skater Sarah Hecken (aged 16) was the youngest team member, while Curling European Champion Andrea Schöpp was the oldest at 44. Three time Olympic champion André Lange (bobsleigh) was the flagbearer at the opening ceremony on 12 February 2010. German athletes earned €15,000 for a gold medal, €10,000 for a silver, and €7,500 for a bronze.

== Medalists ==
Medal	Name	Sport	Event	Date
Gold	Felix Loch	Luge	Men's singles	14 February
Gold	Magdalena Neuner	Biathlon	Women's pursuit	16 February
Gold	Tatjana Hüfner	Luge	Women's singles	16 February
Gold	Maria Riesch	Alpine skiing	Women's super combined	18 February
Gold	Magdalena Neuner	Biathlon	Women's mass start	21 February
Gold	André Lange, Kevin Kuske	Bobsleigh	Two-man	21 February
Gold	Evi Sachenbacher-Stehle, Claudia Nystad	Cross-country skiing	Women's team sprint	22 February
Gold	Viktoria Rebensburg	Alpine skiing	Women's giant slalom	25 February
Gold	Maria Riesch	Alpine skiing	Women's slalom	26 February
Gold	Daniela Anschütz-Thoms, Stephanie Beckert, Anni Friesinger-Postma, Katrin Mattscherodt	Speed skating	Women's team pursuit	27 February
Silver	Magdalena Neuner	Biathlon	Women's sprint	13 February
Silver	Stephanie Beckert	Speed skating	Women's 3000 metres	14 February
Silver	David Möller	Luge	Men's singles	14 February
Silver	Jenny Wolf	Speed skating	Women's 500 metres	16 February
Silver	Kerstin Szymkowiak	Skeleton	Women's	19 February
Silver	Tobias Angerer	Cross-country skiing	Men's 30 kilometre pursuit	20 February
Silver	Thomas Florschütz, Richard Adjei	Bobsleigh	Two-man	21 February
Silver	Michael Neumayer, Andreas Wank, Martin Schmitt, Michael Uhrmann	Ski jumping	Large hill team	22 February
Silver	Tim Tscharnke, Axel Teichmann	Cross-country skiing	Men's team sprint	22 February
Silver	Stephanie Beckert	Speed skating	Women's 5000 metres	24 February
Silver	Katrin Zeller, Evi Sachenbacher-Stehle, Miriam Gössner, Claudia Nystad	Cross-country skiing	Women's 4 x 5 kilometre relay	25 February
Silver	André Lange, Alexander Rödiger, Kevin Kuske, Martin Putze	Bobsleigh	Four-man	27 February
Silver	Axel Teichmann	Cross-country skiing	Men's 50 kilometre classical	28 February
Bronze	Aljona Savchenko, Robin Szolkowy	Figure skating	Pair skating	15 February
Bronze	Natalie Geisenberger	Luge	Women's singles	16 February
Bronze	Patric Leitner, Alexander Resch	Luge	Men's doubles	17 February
Bronze	Anja Huber	Skeleton	Women's	19 February
Bronze	Simone Hauswald	Biathlon	Women's mass start	21 February
Bronze	Simone Hauswald, Kati Wilhelm, Martina Beck, Andrea Henkel	Biathlon	Women's relay	23 February
Bronze	Johannes Rydzek, Tino Edelmann, Eric Frenzel, Björn Kircheisen	Nordic combined	Team competition	23 February

Medals by sport
Sport	gold	silver	bronze	Total
Alpine skiing	3	0	0	3
Biathlon	2	1	2	5
Bobsleigh	1	2	0	3
Cross-country skiing	1	4	0	5
Figure skating	0	0	1	1
Luge	2	1	2	5
Nordic combined	0	0	1	1
Skeleton	0	1	1	2
Ski jumping	0	1	0	1
Speed skating	1	3	0	4
Total	10	13	7	30

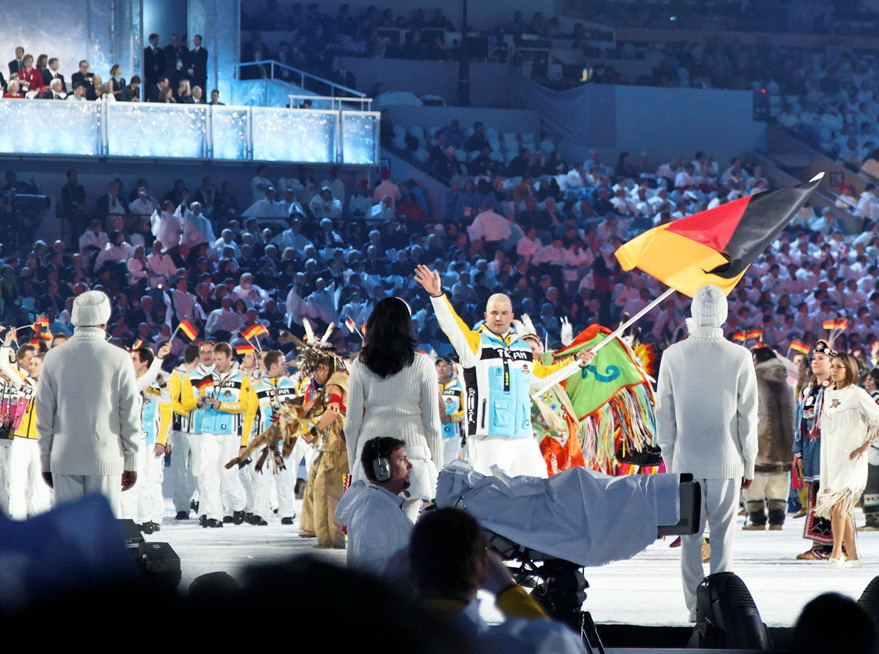
The athletes entering the stadium during the opening ceremonies

== Alpine skiing ==
Athlete	Event	Final			
Athlete	Event	Run 1	Run 2	Total	Rank
Fanny Chmelar	Women's slalom	52.12	did not finish		
Christina Geiger	Women's slalom	52.10	53.52	1:45.62	14
Kathrin Hoelzl	Women's giant slalom	1:15.81	1:11.77	2:27.58	6
Viktoria Rebensburg	Women's super-G	n/a		1:25.23	28
Viktoria Rebensburg	Women's giant slalom	1:15.47	1:11.64	2:27.11	Gold medal
Maria Riesch	Women's downhill	n/a		1:46.26	8
Maria Riesch	Women's super combined	1:24.49	44.65	2:09.14	Gold medal
Maria Riesch	Women's super-G	n/a		1:21.46	8
Maria Riesch	Women's giant slalom	1:15.60	1:12.37	2:27.97	10
Maria Riesch	Women's slalom	50.75	52.14	1:42.89	Gold medal
Susanne Riesch	Women's slalom	51.46	did not finish		
Gina Stechert	Women's downhill	n/a		1:46.93	10
Gina Stechert	Women's super combined	1:25.44	did not finish		
Gina Stechert	Women's super-G	n/a		1:22.21	15
Stephan Keppler	Men's downhill	n/a		1:56.11	24
Stephan Keppler	Men's super-G	n/a		did not finish	
Stephan Keppler	Men's super combined	1:56.09	53.70	2:49.79	24
Felix Neureuther	Men's giant slalom	1:18.24	1:20.82	2:39.06	8
Felix Neureuther	Men's slalom	did not finish			

- Katharina Dürr was also a member of the German team, but did not participate in any event.
- In the super combined, run 1 is the downhill, and run 2 is the slalom.

== Biathlon ==
Men

Athlete	Event	Final		
Athlete	Event	Time	Misses	Rank
Andreas Birnbacher	Sprint	26:06.4	1	23
Andreas Birnbacher	Pursuit	35:03.4	2	13
Andreas Birnbacher	Individual	50:43.5	2	12
Andreas Birnbacher	Mass start	36:30.2	3	15
Michael Greis	Sprint	25:56.0	3	21
Michael Greis	Pursuit	34:39.6	1	5
Michael Greis	Individual	50:37.6	2	10
Michael Greis	Mass start	36:10.7	3	10
Arnd Peiffer	Sprint	26:29.1	2	37
Arnd Peiffer	Pursuit	36:44.9	4	37
Arnd Peiffer	Mass start	36:44.5	2	17
Christoph Stephan	Sprint	25:51.1	1	19
Christoph Stephan	Pursuit	36:02.3	4	30
Christoph Stephan	Individual	52:33.4	3	29
Christoph Stephan	Mass start	37:11.4	4	23
Alexander Wolf	Individual	52:09.0	2	24
Simon Schempp; Andreas Birnbacher; Arnd Peiffer; Michael Greis	Relay	1:23:16.0	2+7	4

Women

Athlete	Event	Final		
Athlete	Event	Time	Misses	Rank
Martina Beck	Individual	44:12.0	2	29
Simone Hauswald	Sprint	21:14.1	2	26
Simone Hauswald	Pursuit	31:58.6	4	16
Simone Hauswald	Mass start	35:26.9	2	Bronze medal
Andrea Henkel	Sprint	21:15.7	2	27
Andrea Henkel	Pursuit	31:40.5	3	10
Andrea Henkel	Individual	42:32.4	2	6
Andrea Henkel	Mass start	36:13.5	1	9
Magdalena Neuner	Sprint	19:57.1	1	Silver medal
Magdalena Neuner	Pursuit	30:16.0	2	Gold medal
Magdalena Neuner	Individual	42:42.1	3	10
Magdalena Neuner	Mass start	35:19.6	2	Gold medal
Kati Wilhelm	Sprint	21:27.2	3	30
Kati Wilhelm	Pursuit	31:43.3	1	12
Kati Wilhelm	Individual	41:57.3	1	4
Kati Wilhelm	Mass start	38:37.7	5	25
Kati Wilhelm; Simone Hauswald; Martina Beck; Andrea Henkel	Relay	1:10:13.4	0+5	Bronze medal

- Tina Bachmann was a member of the German biathlon team, but did not participate in any event.

== Bobsleigh ==
Athlete	Event	Final					
Athlete	Event	Run 1	Run 2	Run 3	Run 4	Total	Rank
Karl Angerer; Alexander Mann (GER-3)	Two-man	52.23	52.43	52.19	52.44	3:29.29	9
Thomas Florschütz; Richard Adjei (GER-2)	Two-man	51.57	51.85	51.62	51.83	3:26.87	Silver medal
André Lange; Kevin Kuske (GER-1)	Two-man	51.59	51.72	51.57	51.77	3:26.65	Gold medal
Sandra Kiriasis; Christin Senkel (GER-1)	Two-woman	53.41	53.23	53.58	53.59	3:33.81	4
Cathleen Martini; Romy Logsch (GER-2)	Two-woman	53.28	53.32	53.39	DSQ		
Claudia Schramm; Janine Tischer (GER-3)	Two-woman	53.65	53.57	53.81	53.65	3:34.68	7
Karl Angerer; Andreas Bredau; Alexander Mann; Gregor Bermbach (GER-3)	Four-man	51.18	51.41	51.70	51.77	3:26.06	7
Thomas Florschütz; Ronny Listner; Andreas Barucha; Richard Adjei (GER-2)	Four-man	51.14	51.36	51.45	51.63	3:25.58	4
André Lange; Kevin Kuske; Alexander Rödiger; Martin Putze (GER-1)	Four-man	51.14	51.05	51.29	51.36	3:24.84	2nd place, silver medalist(s)

== Cross-country skiing ==
Men

Athlete	Event	Qualification		Quarterfinals		Semifinals		Final	
Athlete	Event	Time	Rank	Time	Rank	Time	Rank	Time	Rank
Tobias Angerer	15 km freestyle							34:28.5	7
Tobias Angerer	30 km pursuit							1:15:13.5	Silver medal
Tobias Angerer	50 km classic							2:05:36.0	4
Jens Filbrich	30 km pursuit							1:15:25.0	6
Jens Filbrich	50 km classic							2:06:07.8	16
Tom Reichelt	15 km freestyle							35:50.4	46
Tom Reichelt	30 km pursuit							1:21:13.2	35
René Sommerfeldt	15 km freestyle							35:31.3	36
René Sommerfeldt	30 km pursuit							1:17:11.9	21
René Sommerfeldt	50 km classic							2:06:52.5	21
Axel Teichmann	15 km freestyle							35:47.0	44
Axel Teichmann	50 km classic							2:05:35.8	Silver medal
Tim Tscharnke	Sprint	3:42.03	33	did not qualify					33
Josef Wenzl	Sprint	3:41.88	31	did not qualify					31
Tim Tscharnke; Axel Teichmann	Team sprint					18:48.9	3 Q	19:02.3	Silver medal
Jens Filbrich; Axel Teichmann; René Sommerfeldt; Tobias Angerer	4 x 10 km relay							1:45:49.4	6

Women

Athlete	Event	Qualification		Quarterfinals		Semifinals		Final	
Athlete	Event	Time	Rank	Time	Rank	Time	Rank	Time	Rank
Stefanie Böhler	10 km freestyle							26:19.2	23
Stefanie Böhler	15 km pursuit							43:17.9	36
Stefanie Böhler	30 km classic							1:34:08.7	18
Nicole Fessel	15 km pursuit							42:25.1	22
Nicole Fessel	Sprint	3:44.79	9 Q	3:41.2	4	did not qualify			17
Miriam Gössner	10 km freestyle							26:14.8	21
Hanna Kolb	Sprint	3:50.29	29 Q	3:41.6	5	did not qualify			25
Claudia Nystad	10 km freestyle							25:59.8	16
Evi Sachenbacher-Stehle	10 km freestyle							25:57.7	12
Evi Sachenbacher-Stehle	15 km pursuit							41:37.9	11
Evi Sachenbacher-Stehle	30 km classic							1:31:52.9	4
Katrin Zeller	15 km pursuit							42:26.9	24
Katrin Zeller	30 km classic							1:34:18.1	20
Katrin Zeller	Sprint	3:48.63	24 Q	3:43.0	3	did not qualify			14
Evi Sachenbacher-Stehle; Claudia Nystad	Team sprint					18:34.5	3 Q	18:03.7	Gold medal
Katrin Zeller; Evi Sachenbacher-Stehle; Miriam Gössner; Claudia Nystad	4 x 5 km relay							55:44.1	Silver medal

== Curling ==
=== Men's tournament ===
Men's team

- Andreas Kapp (skip)
- Daniel Herberg
- Holger Höhne
- Andreas Kempf
- Andreas Lang

Fixtures and results

Tuesday, 16 February, 9:00 AM

Sheet C	1	2	3	4	5	6	7	8	9	10	Final
United States (Shuster) 🔨	0	1	0	2	0	0	1	0	1	0	5
Germany (Kapp)	1	0	2	0	1	1	0	2	0	0	7

Tuesday, 16 February, 7:00 PM

Sheet A	1	2	3	4	5	6	7	8	9	10	Final
Canada (Martin) 🔨	2	0	0	0	2	0	3	0	2	x	9
Germany (Kapp)	0	0	2	0	0	1	0	1	0	x	4

Wednesday, 17 February, 2:00 PM

Sheet D	1	2	3	4	5	6	7	8	9	10	Final
Germany (Kapp) 🔨	1	0	0	1	1	0	0	0	0	0	3
Sweden (Edin)	0	0	2	0	0	1	0	1	0	2	6

Thursday, 18 February, 9:00 AM

Sheet B	1	2	3	4	5	6	7	8	9	10	Final
Germany (Kapp) 🔨	0	1	0	1	0	1	0	0	1	0	4
Norway (Ulsrud)	1	0	2	0	2	0	1	0	0	1	7

Friday, 19 February, 2:00 PM

Sheet A	1	2	3	4	5	6	7	8	9	10	Final
Germany (Kapp)	0	0	1	0	1	1	1	0	3	0	7
Switzerland (Stöckli) 🔨	2	0	0	2	0	0	0	1	0	1	6

Saturday, 20 February, 9:00 AM

Sheet B	1	2	3	4	5	6	7	8	9	10	Final
France (Dufour)	0	0	3	1	0	0	0	0	x	x	4
Germany (Kapp) 🔨	2	0	0	0	2	1	2	2	x	x	9

Sunday, 21 February, 2:00 PM

Sheet D	1	2	3	4	5	6	7	8	9	10	Final
Denmark (Schmidt) 🔨	1	0	0	4	1	0	2	0	1	x	9
Germany (Kapp)	0	2	0	0	0	2	0	1	0	x	5

Monday, 22 February, 9:00 AM

Sheet C	1	2	3	4	5	6	7	8	9	10	Final
Germany (Kapp) 🔨	0	0	1	0	2	1	0	2	0	1	7
China (Wang)	2	1	0	1	0	0	1	0	1	0	6

Monday, 22 February, 7:00 PM

Sheet B	1	2	3	4	5	6	7	8	9	10	Final
Germany (Kapp)	0	0	0	0	1	0	1	0	x	x	2
Great Britain (Murdoch) 🔨	1	0	1	2	0	2	0	2	x	x	8

Standings

Final round robin standings
Team	Skip	Pld	W	L	PF	PA	EW	EL	BE	SE	S%	Qualification
Canada	Kevin Martin	9	9	0	75	36	36	28	14	2	85%	Playoffs
Norway	Thomas Ulsrud	9	7	2	64	43	40	32	15	7	84%	Playoffs
Switzerland	Ralph Stöckli	9	6	3	53	44	35	33	20	8	81%	Playoffs
Sweden	Niklas Edin	9	5	4	50	52	34	36	20	6	82%	Tiebreaker
Great Britain	David Murdoch	9	5	4	57	44	35	29	20	9	81%	Tiebreaker
Germany	Andy Kapp	9	4	5	48	60	35	38	11	9	75%	
France	Thomas Dufour	9	3	6	37	63	22	34	16	7	73%	
China	Wang Fengchun	9	2	7	52	60	37	37	9	7	77%	
Denmark	Ulrik Schmidt	9	2	7	45	63	31	29	12	6	78%	
United States	John Shuster	9	2	7	43	59	32	41	18	9	76%	

=== Women's tournament ===
Women's team

- Andrea Schöpp (skip)
- Stella Heiß
- Melanie Robillard
- Corinna Scholz
- Monika Wagner

Fixtures and results

Tuesday, 16 February, 2:00 PM

Sheet C	1	2	3	4	5	6	7	8	9	10	Final
Germany (Schöpp) 🔨	2	0	2	0	1	0	0	1	0	3	9
Russia (Privivkova)	0	1	0	1	0	0	1	0	2	0	5

Wednesday, 17 February, 9:00 AM

Sheet B	1	2	3	4	5	6	7	8	9	10	Final
Germany (Schöpp) 🔨	1	0	0	0	3	0	0	2	0	0	6
United States (McCormick)	0	0	0	1	0	1	1	0	1	1	5

Thursday, 18 February, 2:00 PM

Sheet A	1	2	3	4	5	6	7	8	9	10	11	Final
Canada (Bernard)	0	0	0	2	0	2	0	1	0	0	1	6
Germany (Schöpp) 🔨	0	1	0	0	1	0	1	0	1	1	0	5

Friday, 19 February, 9:00 AM

Sheet A	1	2	3	4	5	6	7	8	9	10	Final
Germany (Schöpp)	1	0	0	0	2	0	0	1	0	x	4
Great Britain (Muirhead) 🔨	0	1	1	1	0	0	1	0	3	x	7

Saturday, 20 February, 2:00 PM

Sheet D	1	2	3	4	5	6	7	8	9	10	11	Final
Germany (Schöpp)	0	1	0	2	0	2	0	1	0	1	0	7
China (Wang) 🔨	1	0	1	0	2	0	2	0	1	0	2	9

Sunday, 21 February, 9:00 AM

Sheet B	1	2	3	4	5	6	7	8	9	10	Final
Germany (Schöpp)	0	0	1	0	0	0	1	0	3	0	5
Denmark (Jensen) 🔨	0	3	0	0	0	1	0	1	0	1	6

Sunday, 21 February, 7:00 PM

Sheet C	1	2	3	4	5	6	7	8	9	10	Final
Japan (Meguro)	0	0	0	1	0	2	0	1	0	2	6
Germany (Schöpp) 🔨	0	2	1	0	1	0	1	0	2	0	7

Tuesday, 23 February, 9:00 AM

Sheet B	1	2	3	4	5	6	7	8	9	10	Final
Switzerland (Ott)	0	0	0	0	1	1	0	1	1	x	4
Germany (Schöpp) 🔨	0	0	1	0	0	0	1	0	0	x	2

Tuesday, 23 February, 7:00 PM

Sheet D	1	2	3	4	5	6	7	8	9	10	Final
Sweden (Norberg) 🔨	2	0	3	0	2	0	1	0	0	0	8
Germany (Schöpp)	0	2	0	2	0	0	0	2	0	1	7

Standings

Final round robin standings
Team	Skip	Pld	W	L	PF	PA	EW	EL	BE	SE	S%	Qualification
Canada	Cheryl Bernard	9	8	1	56	37	40	29	20	13	81%	Playoffs
Sweden	Anette Norberg	9	7	2	56	52	36	36	13	5	79%	Playoffs
China	Wang Bingyu	9	6	3	61	47	39	37	12	7	74%	Playoffs
Switzerland	Mirjam Ott	9	6	3	67	48	40	36	7	12	76%	Playoffs
Denmark	Angelina Jensen	9	4	5	49	61	31	40	15	5	74%	
Germany	Andrea Schöpp	9	3	6	52	56	35	40	15	4	75%	
Great Britain	Eve Muirhead	9	3	6	54	59	36	41	11	10	75%	
Japan	Moe Meguro	9	3	6	64	70	36	37	13	5	73%	
Russia	Liudmila Privivkova	9	3	6	53	60	36	40	14	13	77%	
United States	Debbie McCormick	9	2	7	43	65	36	36	12	12	77%	

== Figure skating ==
Germany will compete in all events for the first time since the reunification.

Athlete(s)	Event	CD		SP/OD		FS/FD		Total	
Athlete(s)	Event	Points	Rank	Points	Rank	Points	Rank	Points	Rank
Stefan Lindemann	Men's			68.50	17	103.48	23	171.98	22
Sarah Hecken	Ladies'			49.04	23	94.90	15	143.94	18
Aliona Savchenko; Robin Szolkowy	Pairs			75.96	2	134.64	3	210.60	3rd place, bronze medalist(s)
Maylin Hausch; Daniel Wende	Pairs			45.46	17	93.28	15	138.74	17
Christina Beier; William Beier	Ice dancing	30.31	16	46.42	18	72.91	18	149.64	18

== Freestyle skiing ==
Germany did not enter athletes for the moguls and aerials events. Martin Fiala made his Olympic debut at the age of 41.

Men

Athlete	Event	Qualifying		1/8 finals	Quarterfinals	Semifinals	Finals	
Athlete	Event	Time	Rank	Position	Position	Position	Position	Rank
Martin Fiala	Men's ski cross	1:15.88	29 Q	3	did not qualify			31
Simon Stickl	Men's ski cross	1:13.49	8 Q	3	did not qualify			19

Women

Athlete	Event	Qualifying		1/8 finals	Quarterfinals	Semifinals	Finals	
Athlete	Event	Time	Rank	Position	Position	Position	Position	Rank
Julia Manhard	Women's ski cross	1:21.10	24 Q	3	did not qualify			25
Anna Wörner	Women's ski cross	1:18.45	7 Q	4 (DNF)	did not qualify			17
Heidi Zacher	Women's ski cross	1:20.35	19 Q	4	did not qualify			20

== Ice hockey ==
=== Men's tournament ===
Roster

The following is the German roster in the men's ice hockey tournament of the 2010 Winter Olympics.

No.	Pos.	Name	Height	Weight	Birthdate	Birthplace	2009–10 team
44	G	Dennis Endras	182 cm (6 ft 0 in)	72 kg (159 lb)	14 July 1985	Immenstadt	(Germany) Augsburger Panther (DEL)
1	G	Thomas Greiss	185 cm (6 ft 1 in)	86 kg (190 lb)	26 January 1986	Füssen	(United States) San Jose Sharks (NHL)
32	G	Dimitri Pätzold	193 cm (6 ft 4 in)	99 kg (218 lb)	3 February 1983	Ust-Kamenogorsk, Kazakh SSR	(Germany) ERC Ingolstadt (DEL)
22	D	Michael Bakos	190 cm (6 ft 3 in)	90 kg (200 lb)	2 March 1979	Augsburg	(Germany) ERC Ingolstadt (DEL)
6	D	Sven Butenschön	192 cm (6 ft 4 in)	96 kg (212 lb)	22 March 1976	Itzehoe	(Germany) Adler Mannheim (DEL)
10	D	Christian Ehrhoff	188 cm (6 ft 2 in)	90 kg (200 lb)	6 July 1982	Moers	(Canada) Vancouver Canucks (NHL)
38	D	Jakub Ficenec	179 cm (5 ft 10 in)	89 kg (196 lb)	11 February 1977	Hradec Králové, Czechoslovakia	(Germany) ERC Ingolstadt (DEL)
5	D	Korbinian Holzer	190 cm (6 ft 3 in)	93 kg (205 lb)	16 February 1988	Munich	(Germany) DEG Metro Stars (DEL)
7	D	Chris Schmidt	189 cm (6 ft 2 in)	91 kg (201 lb)	1 March 1976	Beaverlodge, Alberta, Canada	(Germany) Adler Mannheim (DEL)
84	D	Dennis Seidenberg – A	193 cm (6 ft 4 in)	95 kg (209 lb)	18 July 1981	Villingen-Schwenningen	(United States) Florida Panthers (NHL)
52	D	Alexander Sulzer	185 cm (6 ft 1 in)	94 kg (207 lb)	30 May 1984	Kaufbeuren	(United States) Nashville Predators (NHL)
11	F	Sven Felski – A	180 cm (5 ft 11 in)	76 kg (168 lb)	18 November 1974	Berlin	(Germany) Eisbären Berlin (DEL)
57	F	Marcel Goc	185 cm (6 ft 1 in)	92 kg (203 lb)	24 August 1983	Calw	(United States) Nashville Predators (NHL)
39	F	Thomas Greilinger	180 cm (5 ft 11 in)	110 kg (240 lb)	6 August 1981	Deggendorf	(Germany) ERC Ingolstadt (DEL)
17	F	Jochen Hecht	185 cm (6 ft 1 in)	90 kg (200 lb)	21 June 1977	Mannheim	(United States) Buffalo Sabres (NHL)
18	F	Kai Hospelt	185 cm (6 ft 1 in)	85 kg (187 lb)	23 August 1985	Cologne	(Germany) Grizzly Adams Wolfsburg (DEL)
9	F	Manuel Klinge	180 cm (5 ft 11 in)	80 kg (180 lb)	5 September 1984	Kassel	(Germany) Kassel Huskies (DEL)
25	F	Marcel Müller	193 cm (6 ft 4 in)	104 kg (229 lb)	10 July 1988	Berlin	(Germany) Kölner Haie (DEL)
15	F	T. J. Mulock	183 cm (6 ft 0 in)	88 kg (194 lb)	26 February 1985	Langley, British Columbia, Canada	(Germany) Eisbären Berlin (DEL)
24	F	André Rankel	186 cm (6 ft 1 in)	89 kg (196 lb)	27 August 1985	Berlin	(Germany) Eisbären Berlin (DEL)
19	F	Marco Sturm – C	181 cm (5 ft 11 in)	88 kg (194 lb)	8 September 1978	Dingolfing	(United States) Boston Bruins (NHL)
21	F	John Tripp	191 cm (6 ft 3 in)	104 kg (229 lb)	4 May 1977	Kingston, Ontario, Canada	(Germany) Hamburg Freezers (DEL)
16	F	Michael Wolf	178 cm (5 ft 10 in)	75 kg (165 lb)	24 January 1981	Ehenbichl, Austria	(Germany) Iserlohn Roosters (DEL)

Defenceman Jason Holland was replaced by Sven Butenschön, and forwards Alexander Barta and Philip Gogulla were replaced by Kai Hospelt and Jochen Hecht, respectively.

==== Group play ====
Germany played in Group C.

Round-robin

All times are local (UTC-8).

17 February 2010; 16:30	Sweden	2–0 (0–0, 2–0, 0–0)	Germany	Canada Hockey Place, Vancouver; Attendance: 16,966

Game reference
Henrik Lundqvist	Goalies	Thomas Greiss	Referees: (Canada) Marc Joannette (Canada) Guy Pellerin; Linesmen: (Ukraine) Andriy Kicha (United States) Thor Nelson
M. Öhlund (T. Enström, M. Weinhandl) (PP) – 24:29 / 1–0; L. Eriksson (N. Bäckström) – 34:13 / 2–0			Referees: (Canada) Marc Joannette (Canada) Guy Pellerin; Linesmen: (Ukraine) Andriy Kicha (United States) Thor Nelson
18 min	Penalties	22 min	Referees: (Canada) Marc Joannette (Canada) Guy Pellerin; Linesmen: (Ukraine) Andriy Kicha (United States) Thor Nelson
25	Shots	21	Referees: (Canada) Marc Joannette (Canada) Guy Pellerin; Linesmen: (Ukraine) Andriy Kicha (United States) Thor Nelson

19 February 2010; 21:00	Finland	5–0 (1–0, 2–0, 2–0)	Germany	Canada Hockey Place, Vancouver; Attendance: 16,662

Game reference

Niklas Bäckström
Goalies
Dimitri Pätzold
Referees:
(Russia) Vyacheslav Bulanov
(Canada) Brad Watson
Linesmen:
(United States) Shane Heyer
(Canada) Sylvain Losier

T. Ruutu (J. Niskala, N. Hagman) (PP) – 4:21	1–0
K. Timonen (S. Koivu, O. Jokinen) (PP) – 24:04	2–0
K. Timonen (S. Salo, T. Selänne) (PP) – 36:03	3–0
J. Ruutu (V. Peltonen, N. Kapanen) – 47:10	4–0
J. Pitkänen (N. Hagman) (PP) – 49:01	5–0

6 min
Penalties
12 min
35
Shots
24

20 February 2010; 21:00	Germany	3–5 (1–1, 0–1, 2–3)	Belarus	Canada Hockey Place, Vancouver; Attendance: 16,979

Game reference

Thomas Greiss
Goalies
Vitali Koval
Referees:
(Switzerland) Danny Kurmann
(Canada) Bill McCreary
Linesmen:
(Czech Republic) Petr Blümel
(United States) Shane Heyer

D. Seidenberg (M. Sturm, M. Goc) (PP) – 5:39	1–0
	1–1	10:43 – A. Ugarov
	1–2	28:36 – A. Kalyuzhny (S. Kostitsyn, N. Stasenko)
	1–3	51:10 – S. Kostitsyn (K. Koltsov)
J. Tripp (A. Rankel) – 51:49	2–3
M. Goc (J. Hecht) – 52:10	3–3
	3–4	54:36 – R. Salei (A. Kalyuzhny, S. Kostitsyn) (PP)
	3–5	58:45 – A. Kalyuzhny (K. Koltsov, S. Kostitsyn)

8 min
Penalties
6 min
40
Shots
17

Standings

Team	Pld	W	OTW	OTL	L	GF	GA	GD	Pts	Qualification
Sweden	3	3	0	0	0	9	2	+7	9	Quarterfinals
Finland	3	2	0	0	1	10	4	+6	6	Quarterfinals
Belarus	3	1	0	0	2	8	12	−4	3	
Germany	3	0	0	0	3	3	12	−9	0	

Source: IIHF

==== Final rounds ====
Qualification playoff

23 February 2010; 16:30	Canada	8–2 (1–0, 3–1, 4–1)	Germany	Canada Hockey Place, Vancouver; Attendance: 17,723

Game reference

Roberto Luongo
Goalies
Thomas Greiss
Referees:
(Finland) Jyri Rönn
(United States) Chris Rooney
Linesmen:
(Finland) Stefan Fonselius
(United States) Brian Murphy

J. Thornton (D. Heatley, D. Keith) – 10:13	1–0
S. Weber (M. Richards) – 22:32	2–0
J. Iginla (D. Doughty, E. Staal) (PP) – 23:41	3–0
J. Iginla (E. Staal, D. Boyle) – 28:50	4–0
	4–1	36:34 – M. Goc (C. Schmidt, M. Müller)
S. Crosby (E. Staal, D. Keith) – 41:10	5–1
M. Richards (B. Morrow, J. Toews) – 46:41	6–1
S. Niedermayer – 51:22	7–1
R. Nash (C. Pronger) – 56:28	8–1
	8–2	58:58 – M. Klinge (M. Müller, K. Hospelt)

6 min
Penalties
4 min
39
Shots
23

== Luge ==
Germany earned the maximum quota of ten spots.

Athlete(s)	Event	Run 1	Run 2	Run 3	Run 4	Total	
Athlete(s)	Event	Time	Time	Time	Time	Time	Rank
Andi Langenhan	Men's	48.629	48.658	48.869	48.473	3:14.629	5
Felix Loch	Men's	48.168	48.402	48.344	48.171	3:13.085	Gold medal
David Möller	Men's	48.341	48.511	48.582	48.330	3:13.764	Silver medal
Natalie Geisenberger	Women's	41.743	41.657	41.800	41.901	2:47.101	Bronze medal
Tatjana Hüfner	Women's	41.760	41.481	41.666	41.617	2:46.524	Gold medal
Anke Wischnewski	Women's	41.785	41.685	41.894	41.889	2:47.253	5
André Florschütz, Torsten Wustlich	Doubles	41.545	41.645			1:23.190	5
Patric Leitner, Alexander Resch	Doubles	41.566	41.474			1:23.040	Bronze medal

== Nordic combined ==
Athlete	Event	Ski jumping			Cross-country		
Athlete	Event	Jump distance	Jump score	Rank	Cross-country time	Total	Rank
Tino Edelmann	Large hill/10 km	109.5	86.3	35	25:52.0	+3:02.1	29
Tino Edelmann	Normal hill/10 km	98.5	119.0	16	25:41.6	+1:00.5	18
Eric Frenzel	Large hill/10 km	104.5	74.2	41	26:12.6	+4:10.7	40
Eric Frenzel	Normal hill/10 km	98.0	119.0	16	25:17.2	+36.1	10
Georg Hettich	Large hill/10 km	121.5	106.3	17	26:32.5	+2:22.6	24
Björn Kircheisen	Large hill/10 km	123.5	108.8	12	26:33.5	+2:13.6	20
Björn Kircheisen	Normal hill/10 km	98.0	118.5	19	26:01.3	+1:22.2	22
Johannes Rydzek	Normal hill/10 km	95.5	112.0	30	25:51.3	+1:38.2	28
Tino Edelmann; Johannes Rydzek; Björn Kircheisen; Eric Frenzel	Large hill/4 x 5 km	123.0; 129.0; 132.0; 129.5	473.3; 109.0; 119.0; 124.5; 120.8	6	49:06.1; 11:58.0; 11:56.2; 12:58.3; 12:13.6	+19.5	Bronze medal

== Short track speed skating ==
Men

Athlete	Event	Heat		Quarterfinal		Semifinal		Final	
Athlete	Event	Time	Rank	Time	Rank	Time	Rank	Time	Rank
Paul Herrmann	1000 m	1:26.739	3	did not advance					25
Paul Herrmann	1500 m	2:16.782	6			did not advance			29
Tyson Heung	500 m	41.835	2 Q	48.554	3 ADV	41.455	3 QB	Final B 42.307	5
Tyson Heung	1000 m	1:25.938	2 Q	1:26.098	4	did not advance			12
Tyson Heung	1500 m	2:14.461	4			did not advance			23
Sebastian Praus	1500 m	2:17.058	3 Q			2:16.240	3 QB	Final B 2:20.374	11
Robert Seifert	500 m	42.181	3	did not advance					18
Paul Herrmann; Tyson Heung; Sebastian Praus; Robert Seifert	5000 m relay					6:47.289	3 QB	Final B 6:50.119	7

Robert Becker was also part of the German team but did not participate in any event.

Women

Athlete	Event	Heat		Quarterfinal		Semifinal		Final	
Athlete	Event	Time	Rank	Time	Rank	Time	Rank	Time	Rank
Aika Klein	500 m	45.186	4	did not advance					27
Aika Klein	1000 m	1:58.857	3 ADV	1:51.552	4	did not advance			16
Aika Klein	1500 m	DSQ				did not advance			T33

== Skeleton ==
Germany earned the maximum quota of six spots.

Athlete(s)	Event	Run 1	Run 2	Run 3	Run 4	Total	
Athlete(s)	Event	Time	Time	Time	Time	Time	Rank
Mirsad Halilović	Men's	53.09	53.87	52.92	53.24	3:33.12	13
Frank Rommel	Men's	52.90	53.25	52.55	52.70	3:31.40	7
Sandro Stielicke	Men's	53.18	53.24	52.64	53.02	3:32.08	10
Anja Huber	Women's	54.17	54.21	54.10	53.88	3:36.36	Bronze medal
Kerstin Szymkowiak	Women's	54.15	54.11	53.91	54.03	3:36.20	Silver medal
Marion Trott	Women's	54.53	54.53	53.88	54.17	3:37.11	8

== Ski jumping ==
Athlete	Event	Qualifying		First round		Final		
Athlete	Event	Points	Rank	Points	Rank	Points	Total	Rank
Pascal Bodmer	Normal hill	123.5	18 Q	112.5	31	did not qualify		31
Michael Neumayer	Large hill	135.0	3 Q	125.0	10	122.0	247.0	16
Michael Neumayer	Large hill	129.3	12 Q	122.5	8	123.0	245.5	6
Martin Schmitt	Normal hill	132.5	9 Q	123.0	16	133.0	256.0	10
Martin Schmitt	Large hill	118.9	25 Q	108.0	18	74.4	182.4	30
Michael Uhrmann	Normal hill	138.5	1 Q	133.0	2	129.5	262.5	5
Michael Uhrmann	Large hill	n/a (134,5m)	PQ	108.0	18	94.7	202.7	25
Andreas Wank	Large hill	138.0	3 Q	118.0	11	82.5	200.5	28
Michael Neumayer; Andreas Wank; Martin Schmitt; Michael Uhrmann	Large hill team			509.3; 135.6; 120.3; 119.9; 133.5	2	526.5; 134.7; 141.7; 106.6; 143.5	1035.8	Silver medal

== Snowboarding ==
Halfpipe

Athlete	Event	Qualifying run 1		Qualifying run 2		Semifinal		Final		
Athlete	Event	Points	Rank	Points	Rank	Points	Rank	Run 1	Run 2	Rank
Christophe Schmidt	Men's	9.8	30	32.3	20	did not advance				

Parallel giant slalom

Athlete	Event	Qualification		Round of 16		Quarterfinals		Semifinals (consolation round)		Finals (consolation round)		
Athlete	Event	Time	Rank	Opponent	Time	Opponent	Time	Opponent	Time	Opponent	Time	Rank
Patrick Bussler	Men's	1:18.49	14 Q	Schoch (SUI)	+22.06 L	did not advance						
Anke Karstens	Women's	1:23.90	8 Q	Loo (CAN)	-0.01 W	Kreiner (AUT)	+8.34 L	Kober (GER)	DNS W	Meschik (AUT)	-0.64 W	5
Amelie Kober	Women's	1:24.59	12 Q	Tudegesheva (RUS)	DSQ W	Ilyukhina (RUS)	DSQ L	Karstens (GER)	DNS L	Riegler (AUT)	DNS L	8
Selina Jörg	Women's	1:24.63	14 Q	Guenther (AUT)	-0.41 W	Meschik (AUT)	-0.08 W	Sauerbreij (NED)	DNF L	Kreiner (AUT)	+2.29 L	4
Isabella Laboeck	Women's	1:24.96	15 Q	Sauerbreij (NED)	+17.98 L	did not advance						

Snowboard cross

Athlete	Event	Qualifying		1/8 Finals	Quarterfinals	Semifinals	Finals	
Athlete	Event	Time	Rank	Position	Position	Position	Position	Final rank
David Speiser	Men's	1:23.92	26 Q	2 Q	2 Q	4	4 small final	8
Konstantin Schad	Men's	1:26.69	33	did not advance				33

== Speed skating ==
Men

Athlete	Event	Race 1		Race 2		Final	
Athlete	Event	Time	Rank	Time	Rank	Time	Rank
Patrick Beckert	5000 m					6:36.02	22
Nico Ihle	500 m	35.532	19	35.539	18	71.07	18
Nico Ihle	1000 m					1:11.04	25
Robert Lehmann	5000 m					6:43.77	26
Samuel Schwarz	500 m	35.795	24	35.715	21	71.51	23
Samuel Schwarz	1000 m					1:10.45	16
Samuel Schwarz	1500 m					1:50.07	32
Marco Weber	5000 m					6:36.45	23
Marco Weber	10000 m					13:35.73	10

Women

Athlete	Event	Race 1		Race 2		Final	
Athlete	Event	Time	Rank	Time	Rank	Time	Rank
Monique Angermüller	500 m	38.761	10	38.830	14	77.59	11
Monique Angermüller	1000 m					1:18.179	22
Monique Angermüller	1500 m					1:59.46	13
Daniela Anschütz-Thoms	1500 m					1:58.85	10
Daniela Anschütz-Thoms	3000 m					4:04.87	4
Daniela Anschütz-Thoms	5000 m					6:58.64	4
Stephanie Beckert	3000 m					4:04.62	Silver medal
Stephanie Beckert	5000 m					6:51.39	Silver medal
Anni Friesinger-Postma	1000 m					1:17.71	14
Anni Friesinger-Postma	1500 m					1:58.67	9
Judith Hesse	500 m	39.357	23	39.486	30	78.84	28
Katrin Mattscherodt	3000 m					4:13.72	13
Katrin Mattscherodt	5000 m					DSQ	
Isabell Ost	1500 m					2:01.69	22
Jenny Wolf	500 m	38.307	2	37.838	1	76.14	Silver medal
Jenny Wolf	1000 m					1:17.91	17

Team pursuit

Athlete	Event	Quarterfinal	Semifinal	Final	
Athlete	Event	Opposition time	Opposition time	Opposition time	Rank
Daniela Anschütz-Thoms; Stephanie Beckert; Anni Friesinger-Postma; Katrin Mattscherodt	Women's team pursuit	Netherlands; W −1.43	United States; W −0.23	Japan; W −0.02	Gold medal

== See also ==
- Germany at the Olympics
- Germany at the 2010 Winter Paralympics
