= Japan at the 2010 Winter Olympics =

- IOC code: JPN
- NOC: Japanese Olympic Committee
- Website: www.joc.or.jp (in Japanese and English)

in Vancouver
- Competitors: 94 in 14 sports
- Flag bearers: Tomomi Okazaki (opening); Mao Asada (closing)
- Medals Ranked 20th: Gold 0 Silver 3 Bronze 2 Total 5

Winter Olympics appearances (overview)
- 1928; 1932; 1936; 1948; 1952; 1956; 1960; 1964; 1968; 1972; 1976; 1980; 1984; 1988; 1992; 1994; 1998; 2002; 2006; 2010; 2014; 2018; 2022; 2026

Japan participated in the 2010 Winter Olympics in Vancouver, British Columbia, Canada. Ninety-four athletes participated in all sports except ice hockey. Japanese athletes earned five medals at the games, including three silver and two bronze, short of the 10-medal goal set by the Japanese Olympic team prior to the event. One-hundred eleven Japanese sports officials and coaches accompanied the 94 athletes to the games, a far higher ratio of staff-to-athlete than most other participating nations.

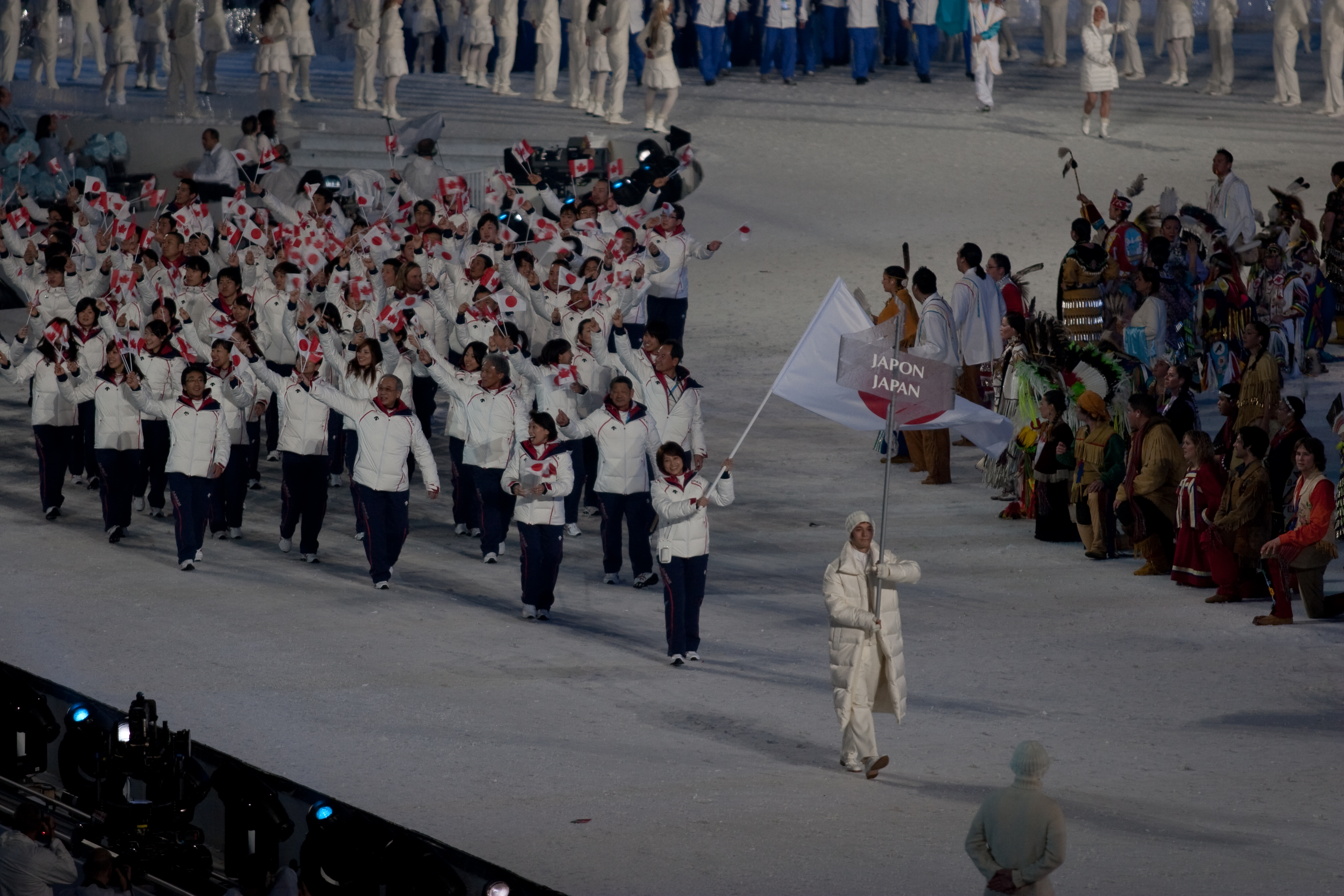
The athletes entering the stadium during the opening ceremonies.

== Medalists ==
Medal	Name	Sport	Event	Date
Silver	Keiichiro Nagashima	Speed skating	Men's 500 metres	February 15
Silver	Mao Asada	Figure skating	Ladies' singles	February 25
Silver	Masako Hozumi; Nao Kodaira; Maki Tabata	Speed skating	Women's team pursuit	February 27
Bronze	Joji Kato	Speed skating	Men's 500 metres	February 15
Bronze	Daisuke Takahashi	Figure skating	Men's singles	February 18

Medals by sport
Sport	1st place, gold medalist(s)	2nd place, silver medalist(s)	3rd place, bronze medalist(s)	Total
Figure skating	0	1	1	2
Speed skating	0	2	1	3
Total	0	3	2	5

== Alpine skiing ==
Athlete	Event	Run 1	Run 2	Total	Rank
Kentaro Minagawa	Men's slalom	DNF			
Akira Sasaki	Men's slalom	49.41	52.35	1:41.76	18

== Biathlon ==
Athlete	Event	Final		
Athlete	Event	Time	Misses	Rank
Hidenori Isa	Men's individual	58:06.2	3+0+3+3	83
Hidenori Isa	Men's sprint	27:42.2	1+2	68
Fuyuko Suzuki	Women's individual	46:30.3	1+1+0+1	53
Fuyuko Suzuki	Women's sprint	21:58.0	1+0	44
Fuyuko Suzuki	Women's pursuit	36:41.9	0+0+0+1	54

== Bobsleigh ==
Athlete	Event	Run 1		Run 2		Run 3		Run 4		Total	
Athlete	Event	Time	Rank	Time	Rank	Time	Rank	Time	Rank	Time	Rank
Hiroshi Suzuki; Ryuichi Kobayashi	Two-man	53.24	23	52.30	23	53.13	21	-	-	2:39.67	21
Manami Hino; Konomi Asazu	Two-woman	54.64	18	54.78	19	54.65	16	54.31	15	3:38.38	16
Hiroshi Suzuki; Shinji Doigawa; Masaru Miyauchi; Ryuichi Kobayashi	Four-man	52.09	19	54.16	21	52.53	18	-	-	2:38.78	21

== Cross-country skiing ==
Athlete	Event	Qualifying		Quarterfinals		Semifinals		Final		
Athlete	Event	Time	Rank	Time	Rank	Time	Rank	Time	Deficit	Rank
Nobu Naruse	Men's 15 kilometre free							36:01.6	2:25.3	49
Nobu Naruse	Men's 30 kilometre pursuit							1:22:11.1	6:59.7	39
Yuichi Onda	Men's sprint	3:38.49	11 Q	3:37.9	4	Did not advance				
Nobuko Fukuda	Women's 10 kilometre free							27:47.7	2:49.3	52
Masako Ishida	Women's 15 kilometre pursuit							42.24.3	2:26.2	20
Michiko Kashiwabara	Women's 10 kilometre free							28:32.0	3:33.6	61
Madoka Natsumi	Women's sprint	3:48.48	22 Q	3:42.6	6	Did not advance				

== Curling ==
=== Women's tournament ===
Standings

Final round robin standings
Team	Skip	Pld	W	L	PF	PA	EW	EL	BE	SE	S%	Qualification
Canada	Cheryl Bernard	9	8	1	56	37	40	29	20	13	81%	Playoffs
Sweden	Anette Norberg	9	7	2	56	52	36	36	13	5	79%	Playoffs
China	Wang Bingyu	9	6	3	61	47	39	37	12	7	74%	Playoffs
Switzerland	Mirjam Ott	9	6	3	67	48	40	36	7	12	76%	Playoffs
Denmark	Angelina Jensen	9	4	5	49	61	31	40	15	5	74%	
Germany	Andrea Schöpp	9	3	6	52	56	35	40	15	4	75%	
Great Britain	Eve Muirhead	9	3	6	54	59	36	41	11	10	75%	
Japan	Moe Meguro	9	3	6	64	70	36	37	13	5	73%	
Russia	Liudmila Privivkova	9	3	6	53	60	36	40	14	13	77%	
United States	Debbie McCormick	9	2	7	43	65	36	36	12	12	77%	

Team

Name	Position
Moe Meguro	Skip
Anna Ohmiya	Third
Mari Motohashi	Second
Kotomi Ishizaki	Lead
Mayo Yamaura	Alternate

Round-robin

Draw 1

Sheet A	1	2	3	4	5	6	7	8	9	10	Final
United States (McCormick) 🔨	1	2	0	1	0	2	0	1	0	0	7
Japan (Meguro)	0	0	1	0	3	0	3	0	1	1	9

Draw 2

Sheet D	1	2	3	4	5	6	7	8	9	10	Final
Japan (Meguro)	0	3	0	0	0	2	0	0	1	0	6
Canada (Bernard) 🔨	0	0	2	0	2	0	0	1	0	2	7

Draw 4

Sheet B	1	2	3	4	5	6	7	8	9	10	Final
China (Wang) 🔨	2	0	0	0	2	0	2	0	0	3	9
Japan (Meguro)	0	1	0	1	0	1	0	2	0	0	5

Draw 6

Sheet C	1	2	3	4	5	6	7	8	9	10	Final
Great Britain (Muirhead)	0	0	1	0	2	0	0	1	0	x	4
Japan (Meguro) 🔨	1	0	0	3	0	1	1	0	5	x	11

Draw 8

Sheet D	1	2	3	4	5	6	7	8	9	10	11	Final
Russia (Privivkova)	0	0	0	3	3	0	0	2	0	1	0	9
Japan (Meguro) 🔨	0	0	0	0	0	3	3	0	3	0	3	12

Draw 9

Sheet C	1	2	3	4	5	6	7	8	9	10	Final
Japan (Meguro)	0	0	0	1	0	2	0	1	0	2	6
Germany (Schöpp) 🔨	0	2	1	0	1	0	1	0	2	0	7

Draw 10

Sheet B	1	2	3	4	5	6	7	8	9	10	Final
Japan (Meguro) 🔨	1	0	1	0	1	0	1	0	x	x	4
Switzerland (Ott)	0	2	0	4	0	2	0	2	x	x	10

Draw 11

Sheet A	1	2	3	4	5	6	7	8	9	10	Final
Japan (Meguro)	0	1	0	1	0	3	0	1	0	x	6
Sweden (Norberg) 🔨	2	0	3	0	1	0	2	0	2	x	10

Draw 12

Sheet C	1	2	3	4	5	6	7	8	9	10	Final
Japan (Meguro)	0	0	0	2	0	2	0	0	1	x	5
Denmark (Jensen) 🔨	0	0	3	0	1	0	0	3	0	x	7

== Figure skating ==
Athlete(s)	Event	CD		SP/OD		FS/FD		Total	
Athlete(s)	Event	Points	Rank	Points	Rank	Points	Rank	Points	Rank
Nobunari Oda	Men's			84.85	4	153.69	7	238.54	7
Daisuke Takahashi	Men's			90.25	3	156.98	5	247.23	3rd place, bronze medalist(s)
Takahiko Kozuka	Men's			79.59	8	151.60	8	231.19	8
Miki Ando	Ladies'			64.76	4	124.10	6	188.86	5
Mao Asada	Ladies'			73.78	2	131.72	2	205.50	2nd place, silver medalist(s)
Akiko Suzuki	Ladies'			61.02	11	120.42	7	181.44	8
Cathy Reed, Chris Reed	Ice dancing	29.49	18	50.81	14	79.30	16	159.60	17

== Freestyle skiing ==
Moguls

Athlete	Event	Qualifying		Final	
Athlete	Event	Points	Rank	Points	Rank
Sho Endo	Men's moguls	24.36	8 Q	25.38	7
Nobuyuki Nishi	Men's moguls	23.52	15 Q	25.11	9
Kai Ozaki	Men's moguls	22.07	24	Did not advance	
Yugo Tsukita	Men's moguls	23.80	11 Q	22.74	17
Miki Ito	Women's moguls	21.81	15 Q	21.63	12
Arisa Murata	Women's moguls	22.99	11 Q	23.22	8
Tae Satoya	Women's moguls	22.15	13 Q	12.85	19
Aiko Uemura	Women's moguls	24.31	5 Q	24.68	4

Ski cross

Athlete	Event	Qualifying		1/8 finals	Quarterfinals	Semifinals	Finals	
Athlete	Event	Time	Rank	Position	Position	Position	Position	Rank
Hiroomi Takizawa	Men's ski cross	1:15.03	26 Q	3	Did not advance			29
Noriko Fukushima	Women's ski cross	1:20.56	21 Q	3	Did not advance			22

== Luge ==
Athlete(s)	Event	Run 1	Run 2	Run 3	Run 4	Total	
Athlete(s)	Event	Time	Time	Time	Time	Time	Rank
Takahisa Oguchi	Men's	49.542	49.780	49.818	49.903	3:19.043	30
Madoka Harada	Women's	42.608	42.112	42.572	43.188	2:50.480	26
Aya Yasuda	Women's	DSQ*					

*= Disqualified for being over the allowed weight

== Nordic combined ==
Athlete	Event	Ski jumping			Cross-country		Total	
Athlete	Event	Jump distance	Jump score	Rank	Time	Rank	Time	Rank
Taihei Kato	Normal hill/10 km	96.5	114.0	28	25:43.9	25	27:09.9	24
Taihei Kato	Large hill/10 km	112.5	90.2	31	26:11.0	28	28:38.0	30
Norihito Kobayashi	Normal hill/10 km	99.0	121.0	12	25:11.0	9	26:09.0	7
Norihito Kobayashi	Large hill/10 km	112.0	90.5	30	26:00.1	23	28:26.1	27
Yūsuke Minato	Normal hill/10 km	DNS						
Yūsuke Minato	Large hill/10 km	110.0	87.0	34	25:30.0	13	28:10.0	26
Daito Takahashi	Normal hill/10 km	98.0	199.5	13	26:21.0	33	27:25.0	27
Daito Takahashi	Large hill/10 km	DNS						
Akito Watabe	Normal hill/10 km	96.5	114.5	27	25:41.0	23	27.15.0	21
Akito Watabe	Large hill/10 km	125.0	112.5	9	25:23.7	11	26:21.7	9
Daito Takahashi; Akito Watabe; Norihito Kobayashi; Taihei Kato	Team	518	475.9	4	50:04.8	6	50:45.8	6

== Short track speed skating ==
Men

Athlete	Event	Heat		Quarterfinal		Semifinal		Final	
Athlete	Event	Time	Rank	Time	Rank	Time	Rank	Time	Rank
Takahiro Fujimoto	500 m	42.366	4	Did not advance					
Takahiro Fujimoto	1000 m	1:26.359	4	Did not advance					
Takahiro Fujimoto	1500 m	2:16.155	3 Q			2:15.984	6	Did not advance	
Yuzo Takamido	1000 m	1:26.074	3	Did not advance					
Yuzo Takamido	1500 m	2:15.402	5			Did not advance			
Junpei Yoshizawa	500 m	42.158	2 Q	41.906	4	Did not advance			
Junpei Yoshizawa	1500 m	2:30.701	5 ADV			2:15.129	6	Did not advance	

Women

Athlete	Event	Heat		Quarterfinal		Semifinal		Final	
Athlete	Event	Time	Rank	Time	Rank	Time	Rank	Time	Rank
Ayuko Ito	1000 m	1:31.137	3	Did not advance					
Mika Ozawa	1000 m	1:32.577	2 Q	1:32.183	4	Did not advance			
Mika Ozawa	1500 m	DSQ							
Hiroko Sadakane	1500 m	2:28.046	2 Q			2:24.901	4 QB	2:24.135	12
Yui Sakai	500 m	44.341	3	Did not advance					
Biba Sakurai	500 m	45.146	4	Did not advance					
Biba Sakurai	1000 m	1:36.416	3	Did not advance					
Biba Sakurai	1500 m	2:30.458	5	Did not advance					
Ayuko Ito; Mika Ozawa; Yui Sakai; Biba Sakurai	3000 m relay					4:13.752	3 QB	4:28.745	7

== Skeleton ==
Athlete(s)	Event	Run 1	Run 2	Run 3	Run 4	Total	
Athlete(s)	Event	Time	Time	Time	Time	Time	Rank
Kazuhiro Koshi	Men's	54.02	54.10	53.74	53.42	3:35.28	20
Shinsuke Tayama	Men's	53.94	53.84	54.03	53.36	3:35.17	19
Nozomi Komuro	Women's	DSQ					

== Ski jumping ==
Athlete	Event	Qualifying		First Round		Final		
Athlete	Event	Points	Rank	Points	Rank	Points	Total	Rank
Daiki Ito	Large hill	142.6	2 Q	95.6	30 Q	121.3	216.9	20
Daiki Ito	Normal hill	134.5	5 Q	125.0	10 Q	124.5	249.5	15
Noriaki Kasai	Large hill	143.5	1 Q	105.7	21 Q	133.5	239.2	8
Noriaki Kasai	Normal hill	133.5	6 Q	120.5	19 Q	124.0	244.5	17
Takanobu Okabe	Large hill	DNS						
Takanobu Okabe	Normal hill	DNS						
Taku Takeuchi	Large hill	121.6	22 Q	83.9	37	DNQ		37
Taku Takeuchi	Normal hill	113.5	33 Q	110.5	34	DNQ		34
Shōhei Tochimoto	Large hill	123.4	19 Q	73.4	45	DNQ		45
Shōhei Tochimoto	Normal hill	111.0	39 Q	108.5	37	DNQ		37
Daiki Ito; Taku Takeuchi; Shōhei Tochimoto; Noriaki Kasai	Team			484.7	5 Q	523.0	1007.7	5

== Snowboarding ==
Halfpipe

Athlete	Event	Qualifying		Semifinal		Final	
Athlete	Event	Points	Rank	Points	Rank	Points	Rank
Ryo Aono	Men's	43.1	2 QF	Bye		32.9	9
Kazuhiro Kokubo	Men's	42.5	2 QF	Bye		35.7	8
Kohei Kudo	Men's	37.1	7 QS	33.5	8	DNQ	
Daisuke Murakami	Men's	23.5	15	DNQ			
Shiho Nakashima	Women's	31.4	14 QS	34.9	7	DNQ	
Rana Okada	Women's	7.2	29	DNQ			
Soko Yamaoka	Women's	37.0	9 QS	30.6	10	DNQ	

Parallel Giant Slalom

Athlete	Event	Qualification		Round of 16	Quarterfinals	Semifinals	Finals	
Athlete	Event	Time	Rank	Opposition time	Opposition time	Opposition time	Opposition time	Rank
Yuki Nofuji	Men's	1:23.88	27	DNQ				
Tomoka Takeuchi	Women's	1:24.42	10 Q	(Austria) Claudia Riegler; L +12.68	DNQ			
Eri Yanetani	Women's	1:26.39	21	DNQ				

Snowboard cross

Athlete	Event	Qualifying		Quarterfinal	Semifinal	Final
Athlete	Event	Time	Rank	Rank	Rank	Rank
Natsuko Doi	Women's	1:31.23	14 Q	3	DNQ	
Yuka Fujimori	Women's	DNS				

== Speed skating ==
Men

Athlete	Event	Run 1		Run 2		Final	
Athlete	Event	Time	Rank	Time	Rank	Time	Rank
Shigeyuki Dejima	5000 m					6:43.82	27
Shingo Doi	1500 m					1:49.77	30
Ryohei Haga	1000 m					1:11.46	29
Hiroki Hirako	5000 m					6:33.90	19
Hiroki Hirako	10000 m					13:37.56	11
Joji Kato	500 m	34.937	3	35.076	5	70.01	3rd place, bronze medalist(s)
Keiichiro Nagashima	500 m	35.108	6	34.876	1	69.98	2nd place, silver medalist(s)
Keiichiro Nagashima	1000 m					1:12.71	37
Tadashi Obara	1000 m					1:10.51	17
Akio Ohta	500 m	35.315	15	35.347	17	70.66	17
Yuya Oikawa	500 m	35.174	13	35.254	14	70.42	13
Teruhiro Sugimori	1000 m					1:11.13	26
Teruhiro Sugimori	1500 m					1:49.19	26

Women

Athlete	Event	Run 1		Run 2		Final	
Athlete	Event	Time	Rank	Time	Rank	Time	Rank
Masako Hozumi	3000 m					4:07.36	6
Masako Hozumi	5000 m					7:04.97	7
Shiho Ishizawa	3000 m					4:15.62	15
Shiho Ishizawa	5000 m					7:12.23	9
Nao Kodaira	500 m	38.835	12	38.797	12	77.63	12
Nao Kodaira	1000 m					1:16.80	5
Nao Kodaira	1500 m					1:58.20	5
Eri Natori	3000 m					4:18:18	21
Tomomi Okazaki	500 m	38.971	17	39.060	20	78.03	16
Tomomi Okazaki	1000 m					1:19.41	34
Shihomi Shinya	500 m	38.964	16	38.765	10	77.72	14
Maki Tabata	1500 m					2:00.12	19
Miho Takagi	1000 m					1:19.53	35
Miho Takagi	1500 m					2:01.86	23
Sayuri Yoshii	500 m	38.566	6	38.432	5	76.99	5
Sayuri Yoshii	1000 m					1:17.81	15
Sayuri Yoshii	1500 m					2:02.26	26

== See also ==
- Japan at the Olympics
- Japan at the 2010 Winter Paralympics
