= Speed skating at the 2010 Winter Olympics – Men's 1000 metres =

Speed skating at the Olympics

Men's 1000 metres at the XXI Olympic Winter Games
- Venue: Richmond Olympic Oval
- Date: 17 February 2010
- Competitors: 38 from 13 nations
- Winning time: 1:08.94

Medalists
1st place, gold medalist(s)		Shani Davis	United States
2nd place, silver medalist(s)		Mo Tae-bum	South Korea
3rd place, bronze medalist(s)		Chad Hedrick	United States

The men's 1000 metres speed skating competition of the Vancouver 2010 Olympics was held at the Richmond Olympic Oval on 17 February 2010.

== Records ==
Prior to this competition, the existing world and Olympic records were as follows.

World record	Shani Davis (USA)	1:06.42	Salt Lake City, United States	7 March 2009
Olympic record	Gerard van Velde (NED)	1:07.18	Salt Lake City, United States	16 February 2002

No new world or Olympic records were set during this competition.

== Results ==
Rank	Pair	Lane	Name	Country	Time	Time behind	Notes
1st place, gold medalist(s)	19	o	Shani Davis	United States	1:08.94		
2nd place, silver medalist(s)	16	o	Mo Tae-bum	South Korea	1:09.12	+0.18	
3rd place, bronze medalist(s)	16	i	Chad Hedrick	United States	1:09.32	+0.38	
4	12	i	Stefan Groothuis	Netherlands	1:09.45	+0.51	
5	18	i	Mark Tuitert	Netherlands	1:09.48	+0.54	
6	13	o	Simon Kuipers	Netherlands	1:09.65	+0.71	
7	12	o	Nick Pearson	United States	1:09.79	+0.85	
8	17	i	Mika Poutala	Finland	1:09.85	+0.91	
9	17	o	Lee Kyou-hyuk	South Korea	1:09.92	+0.98	
10	14	i	Trevor Marsicano	United States	1:10.11	+1.17	
11	13	i	Yevgeny Lalenkov	Russia	1:10.14	+1.20	
12	14	o	Jan Bos	Netherlands	1:10.29	+1.35	
13	18	o	Denny Morrison	Canada	1:10.30	+1.36	
14	11	i	Jeremy Wotherspoon	Canada	1:10.35	+1.41	
15	3	i	Mikael Flygind Larsen	Norway	1:10.38	+1.44	
16	10	i	Samuel Schwarz	Germany	1:10.45	+1.51	
17	4	i	Tadashi Obara	Japan	1:10.51	+1.57	
18	19	i	Mun Jun	South Korea	1:10.68	+1.74	
19	9	i	Håvard Bøkko	Norway	1:10.73	+1.79	
20	3	o	François-Olivier Roberge	Canada	1:10.75	+1.81	
21	7	o	Dmitry Lobkov	Russia	1:10.795	+1.855	RS
22	11	o	Aleksey Yesin	Russia	1:10.797	+1.857	
23	1	o	Denis Kuzin	Kazakhstan	1:10.88	+1.94	
24	15	i	Kyle Parrott	Canada	1:10.89	+1.95	
25	15	o	Nico Ihle	Germany	1:11.04	+2.10	
26	2	o	Teruhiro Sugimori	Japan	1:11.13	+2.19	
27	5	o	Konrad Niedźwiedzki	Poland	1:11.24	+2.30	
28	6	i	Roman Krech	Kazakhstan	1:11.27	+2.33	
29	1	i	Ryohei Haga	Japan	1:11.46	+2.52	
30	8	i	Matteo Anesi	Italy	1:11.51	+2.57	
31	2	i	Wang Nan	China	1:11.82	+2.88	
32	10	o	Maciej Ustynowicz	Poland	1:12.10	+3.16	
33	6	o	Ermanno Ioriatti	Italy	1:12.15	+3.21	
34	4	o	Tuomas Nieminen	Finland	1:12.26	+3.32	
35	5	i	Christoffer Fagerli Rukke	Norway	1:12.31	+3.37	
36	9	o	Lee Ki-ho	South Korea	1:12.33	+3.39	
37	7	i	Keiichiro Nagashima	Japan	1:12.71	+3.77	RS
38	8	o	Aleksandr Lebedev	Russia	1:12.78	+3.84	

Legend

RS – Reskate
