= Kyle Parrott =

Canadian speed skater

Personal information
- Born: 13 September 1985 (age 40) Canada
- Height: 185 cm (6 ft 1 in)
- Weight: 86 kg (190 lb)

Sport
- Country: Canada
- Sport: Speed skating
- Club: Westman Speed Skating, Brandon, Manitoba

Achievements and titles
- Olympic finals: 2010

Kyle Parrott (born 13 September 1985) is a Canadian long track speed skater.

He competed at the 2010 Winter Olympics in Vancouver in the men's 500 metre, 1000 metre and 1500 metre competitions.
