= Speed skating at the 2010 Winter Olympics – Women's 1500 metres =

Women's 1500 metres at the XXI Olympic Winter Games
- Venue: Richmond Olympic Oval
- Date: 21 February 2010
- Competitors: 36 from 14 nations
- Winning time: 1:56.89

Medalists
1st place, gold medalist(s)		Ireen Wüst	Netherlands
2nd place, silver medalist(s)		Kristina Groves	Canada
3rd place, bronze medalist(s)		Martina Sáblíková	Czech Republic

The women's 1500 metres speed skating competition of the 2010 Winter Olympics in Vancouver was held at the Richmond Olympic Oval on 21 February 2010.

== Records ==
Prior to this competition, the existing world and Olympic records were as follows.

World record	Cindy Klassen (CAN)	1:51.79	Salt Lake City, United States	20 November 2005
Olympic record	Anni Friesinger (GER)	1:54.02	Salt Lake City, United States	20 February 2002

No new world or Olympic records were set during this competition. Ireen Wüst did equal the track record of 1:56.89 set by Christine Nesbitt on 18 October 2009.

== Results ==
Rank	Pair	Lane	Name	Country	Time	Behind	Notes
1st place, gold medalist(s)	15	o	Ireen Wüst	Netherlands	1:56.89	0.00	
2nd place, silver medalist(s)	17	o	Kristina Groves	Canada	1:57.14	+0.25	
3rd place, bronze medalist(s)	16	o	Martina Sáblíková	Czech Republic	1:57.96	+1.07	
4	14	o	Margot Boer	Netherlands	1:58.10	+1.21	
5	13	i	Nao Kodaira	Japan	1:58.20	+1.31	
6	18	i	Christine Nesbitt	Canada	1:58.33	+1.44	
7	8	i	Annette Gerritsen	Netherlands	1:58.46	+1.57	
8	12	o	Yekaterina Shikhova	Russia	1:58.54	+1.65	
9	11	o	Anni Friesinger-Postma	Germany	1:58.67	+1.78	
10	15	i	Daniela Anschütz-Thoms	Germany	1:58.85	+1.96	
11	7	o	Yekaterina Lobysheva	Russia	1:59.01	+2.12	
12	14	i	Alla Shabanova	Russia	1:59.35	+2.46	
13	13	o	Monique Angermüller	Germany	1:59.46	+2.57	
14	2	i	Hege Bøkko	Norway	1:59.52	+2.63	
15	17	i	Katarzyna Bachleda-Curuś	Poland	1:59.53	+2.64	
16	4	i	Heather Richardson	United States	1:59.56	+2.67	
17	10	i	Laurine van Riessen	Netherlands	1:59.79	+2.90	
18	18	o	Jennifer Rodriguez	United States	2:00.08	+3.19	
19	11	i	Maki Tabata	Japan	2:00.12	+3.23	
20	5	o	Wang Fei	China	2:00.65	+3.76	
21	12	i	Cindy Klassen	Canada	2:00.67	+3.78	
22	10	o	Isabell Ost	Germany	2:01.69	+4.80	
23	4	o	Miho Takagi	Japan	2:01.86	+4.97	
24	9	i	Jilleanne Rookard	United States	2:01.95	+5.06	
25	8	o	Karolína Erbanová	Czech Republic	2:02.01	+5.12	
26	5	i	Sayuri Yoshii	Japan	2:02.26	+5.37	
27	1	o	Chiara Simionato	Italy	2:02.38	+5.49	
28	6	o	Anna Rokita	Austria	2:02.67	+5.78	
29	6	i	Yekaterina Aydova	Kazakhstan	2:02.81	+5.92	
30	7	i	Noh Seon-yeong	South Korea	2:02.84	+5.95	
31	1	i	Catherine Raney-Norman	United States	2:03.02	+6.13	
32	2	o	Yekaterina Abramova	Russia	2:03.19	+6.30	
33	3	i	Lee Ju-yeon	South Korea	2:03.67	+6.78	
34	9	o	Luiza Złotkowska	Poland	2:04.01	+7.12	
35	16	i	Brittany Schussler	Canada	2:04.17	+7.28	
36	3	o	Natalia Czerwonka	Poland	2:05.00	+8.11	
