= Speed skating at the 2010 Winter Olympics – Women's 1000 metres =

Women's 1000 metres at the XXI Olympic Winter Games
- Venue: Richmond Olympic Oval
- Date: 18 February 2010
- Competitors: 36 from 15 nations
- Winning time: 1:16.56

Medalists
1st place, gold medalist(s)		Christine Nesbitt	Canada
2nd place, silver medalist(s)		Annette Gerritsen	Netherlands
3rd place, bronze medalist(s)		Laurine van Riessen	Netherlands

The women's 1000 metres speed skating competition of the 2010 Winter Olympics was held at the Richmond Olympic Oval on 18 February 2010.

== Records ==
Prior to this competition, the existing world and Olympic records were as follows.

World record	Cindy Klassen (CAN)	1:13.11	Calgary, Canada	25 March 2006
Olympic record	Chris Witty (USA)	1:13.83	Salt Lake City, United States	17 February 2002

== Results ==
Rank	Pair	Lane	Name	Country	Time	Time behind	Notes
1st place, gold medalist(s)	17	i	Christine Nesbitt	Canada	1:16.56	0.00	
2nd place, silver medalist(s)	16	o	Annette Gerritsen	Netherlands	1:16.58	+0.02	
3rd place, bronze medalist(s)	13	o	Laurine van Riessen	Netherlands	1:16.72	+0.16	
4	18	i	Kristina Groves	Canada	1:16.78	+0.22	
5	15	i	Nao Kodaira	Japan	1:16.80	+0.24	
6	18	o	Margot Boer	Netherlands	1:16.94	+0.38	
7	11	i	Jennifer Rodriguez	United States	1:17.08	+0.52	
8	12	o	Ireen Wüst	Netherlands	1:17.28	+0.72	
9	12	i	Heather Richardson	United States	1:17.37	+0.81	
10	2	o	Hege Bøkko	Norway	1:17.43	+0.87	
11	7	i	Yekaterina Shikhova	Russia	1:17.46	+0.90	
12	3	o	Karolína Erbanová	Czech Republic	1:17.53	+0.97	
13	2	i	Ko Hyon-Suk	North Korea	1:17.63	+1.07	
14	11	o	Anni Friesinger-Postma	Germany	1:17.71	+1.15	
15	16	i	Sayuri Yoshii	Japan	1:17.81	+1.25	
16	1	o	Yekaterina Aydova	Kazakhstan	1:17.85	+1.29	
17	3	i	Jenny Wolf	Germany	1:17.91	+1.35	
18	9	o	Jin Peiyu	China	1:17.97	+1.41	
19	4	o	Chiara Simionato	Italy	1:18.02	+1.46	
20	13	i	Olga Fatkulina	Russia	1:18.13	+1.57	
21	6	i	Shannon Rempel	Canada	1:18.174	+1.61	
22	17	o	Monique Angermüller	Germany	1:18.179	+1.61	
23	10	o	Lee Sang-hwa	South Korea	1:18.24	+1.68	
24	15	o	Wang Beixing	China	1:18.30	+1.74	
25	14	i	Brittany Schussler	Canada	1:18.31	+1.75	
26	14	o	Elli Ochowicz	United States	1:18.33	+1.77	
27	8	i	Yekaterina Malysheva	Russia	1:18.56	+2.00	
28	9	i	Yekaterina Lobysheva	Russia	1:18.785	+2.22	
29	1	i	Rebekah Bradford	United States	1:18.788	+2.22	
30	4	i	Sophie Muir	Australia	1:18.79	+2.23	
31	10	i	Katarzyna Bachleda-Curuś	Poland	1:19.00	+2.44	
32	7	o	Yu Jing	China	1:19.13	+2.57	
33	8	o	Ren Hui	China	1:19.18	+2.62	
34	5	o	Tomomi Okazaki	Japan	1:19.41	+2.85	
35	6	o	Miho Takagi	Japan	1:19.53	+2.97	
	5	i	Kim Yu-Lim	South Korea	DNF		
