= Biathlon at the 2010 Winter Olympics – Women's mass start =

Women's mass start at the XXI Olympic Winter Games
- Pictogram for biathlon
- Venue: Whistler Olympic Park
- Date: 21 February 2010
- Competitors: 30 from 12 nations
- Winning time: 35:19.6

Medalists
1st place, gold medalist(s)		Magdalena Neuner	Germany
2nd place, silver medalist(s)		Olga Zaitseva	Russia
3rd place, bronze medalist(s)		Simone Hauswald	Germany

The Women's 12.5 kilometre mass start biathlon competition of the Vancouver 2010 Olympics was held at Whistler Olympic Park in Whistler, British Columbia on 21 February 2010.

== Results ==
Rank	Bib	Name	Country	Time	Penalties (P+P+S+S)	Deficit
1st place, gold medalist(s)	2	Magdalena Neuner	Germany	35:19.6	2 (1+0+1+0)	
2nd place, silver medalist(s)	16	Olga Zaitseva	Russia	35:25.1	1 (0+0+1+0)	+5.5
3rd place, bronze medalist(s)	12	Simone Hauswald	Germany	35:26.9	2 (0+0+2+0)	+7.3
4	13	Olga Medvedtseva	Russia	35:40.8	0 (0+0+0+0)	+21.2
DSQ (5)	15	Teja Gregorin	Slovenia	35:49.0	1 (0+0+0+1)	+29.4
5	7	Darya Domracheva	Belarus	35:53.2	1 (0+0+1+0)	+33.6
6	17	Sandrine Bailly	France	36:02.0	2 (0+0+2+0)	+42.4
7	1	Anastasiya Kuzmina	Slovakia	36:02.9	3 (1+1+1+0)	+43.3
8	9	Andrea Henkel	Germany	36:13.5	1 (1+0+0+0)	+53.9
9	8	Helena Jonsson	Sweden	36:15.9	2 (1+1+0+0)	+56.3
10	19	Ann Kristin Flatland	Norway	36:16.0	4 (0+2+1+1)	+56.4
11	27	Olena Pidhrushna	Ukraine	36:22.8	2 (1+0+0+1)	+1:03.2
12	11	Anna Carin Olofsson-Zidek	Sweden	36:22.9	4 (1+1+1+1)	+1:03.3
13	14	Svetlana Sleptsova	Russia	36:23.3	3 (0+2+0+1)	+1:03.7
14	6	Marie-Laure Brunet	France	36:39.5	3 (0+0+1+2)	+1:19.9
15	5	Marie Dorin	France	36:40.9	1 (1+0+0+0)	+1:21.3
16	20	Liudmila Kalinchik	Belarus	36:55.2	1 (0+0+0+1)	+1:35.6
17	3	Tora Berger	Norway	36:58.3	4 (1+0+1+2)	+1:38.7
18	18	Valj Semerenko	Ukraine	37:12.5	3 (0+2+1+0)	+1:52.9
19	24	Krystyna Pałka	Poland	37:22.6	1 (1+0+0+0)	+2:03.0
20	25	Weronika Nowakowska	Poland	37:34.0	4 (1+2+1+0)	+2:14.4
21	29	Nadezhda Skardino	Belarus	37:38.1	1 (0+0+0+1)	+2:18.5
22	26	Agnieszka Cyl	Poland	37:54.7	5 (0+1+2+2)	+2:35.1
23	23	Éva Tófalvi	Romania	38:00.7	5 (0+1+2+2)	+2:41.1
24	10	Kati Wilhelm	Germany	38:37.7	5 (1+3+1+0)	+3:18.1
25	30	Andreja Mali	Slovenia	38:53.9	4 (0+2+0+2)	+3:34.3
26	4	Elena Khrustaleva	Kazakhstan	39:01.3	5 (2+2+1+0)	+3:41.7
27	28	Anna Maria Nilsson	Sweden	39:05.8	4 (1+1+1+1)	+3:46.2
28	21	Oksana Khvostenko	Ukraine	39:11.0	3 (0+2+1+0)	+3:51.4
29	22	Anna Boulygina	Russia	39:17.2	8 (4+1+2+1)	+3:57.6

Teja Gregorin was the only competitor who failed the 2017 doping retests from the 2010 Winter Olympics. In October 2017, the International Biathlon Union said that her two samples tested positive for GHRP-2, a banned substance which stimulates the body to produce more growth hormone, in samples taken the week before competition started. She was disqualified in December 2017.
