= Biathlon at the 2010 Winter Olympics – Men's mass start =

Men's mass start at the XXI Olympic Winter Games
- Venue: Whistler Olympic Park
- Date: February 21, 2010
- Competitors: 30 from 16 nations
- Winning time: 35:35.7

Medalists
1st place, gold medalist(s)		Martin Fourcade	France
2nd place, silver medalist(s)		Pavol Hurajt	Slovakia
3rd place, bronze medalist(s)		Christoph Sumann	Austria

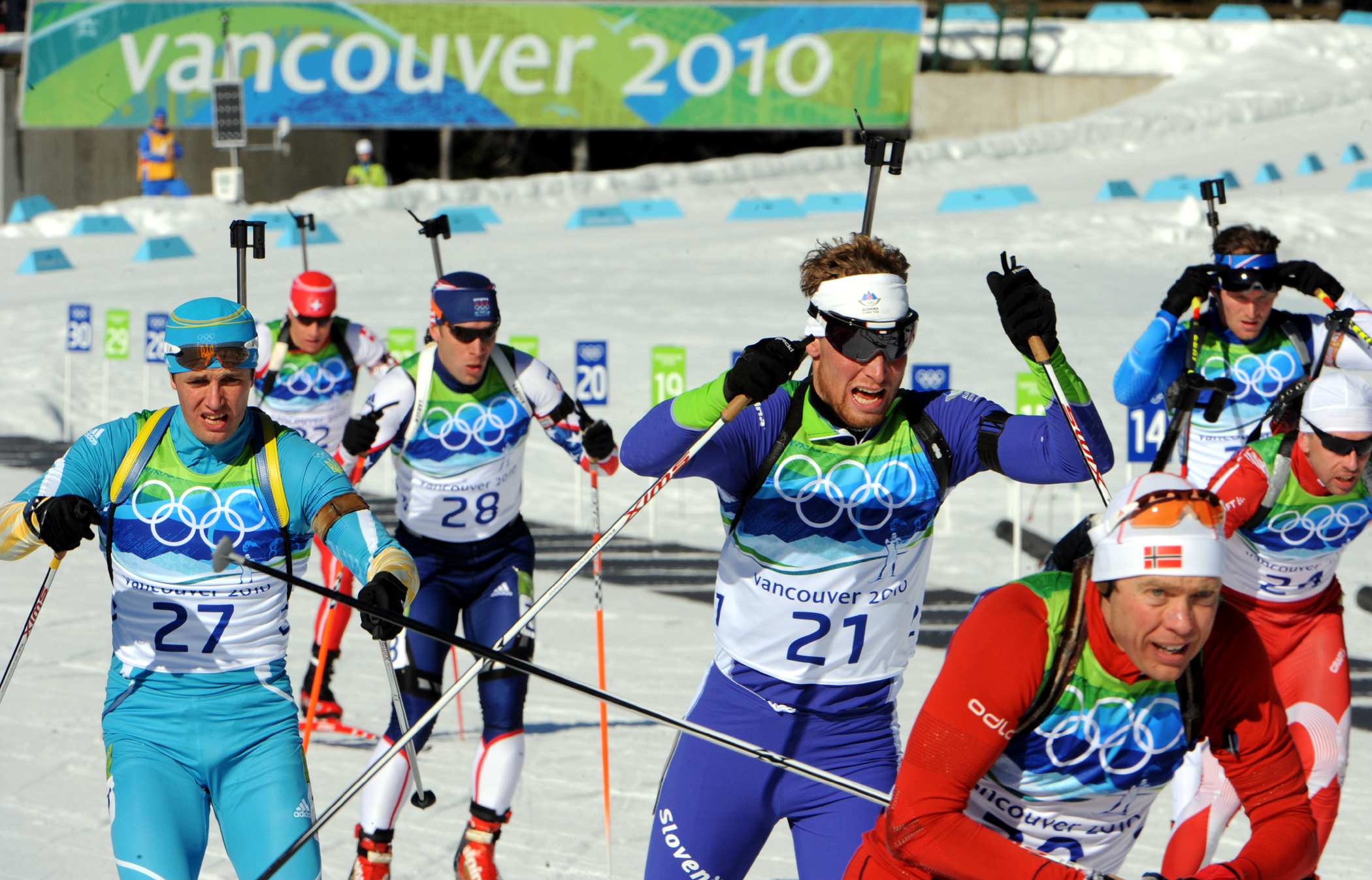
Competitors in the men's mass start

The men's mass start competition of the Vancouver 2010 Olympics was held at Whistler Olympic Park in Whistler, British Columbia on February 21, 2010.

On October 26, 2020, it was announced that Evgeny Ustyugov of Russia was charged by the Biathlon Integrity Unit for haemoglobin doping and could lose his 2010 results. The decision was confirmed in 2024, resulting in his disqualification for the gold medal. In May 2025 the final appeals of the decision were exhausted, and in September the International Olympic Committee formally reallocated Ustyugov's medals — a gold and a bronze from 2010 and a relay gold from 2014 — to other athletes. On 15 February 2026, the reallocated athletes were awarded medals during a special ceremony at the 2026 Winter Olympics.

== Results ==
Rank	Bib	Name	Country	Time	Penalties (P+P+S+S)	Deficit
1st place, gold medalist(s)	16	Martin Fourcade	France	35:46.2	3 (2+0+0+1)	+10.5
2nd place, silver medalist(s)	19	Pavol Hurajt	Slovakia	35:52.3	0 (0+0+0+0)	+16.6
3rd place, bronze medalist(s)	4	Christoph Sumann	Austria	36:01.6	1 (0+1+0+0)	+25.9
4	17	Daniel Mesotitsch	Austria	36:05.9	3 (0+1+0+2)	+30.2
5	12	Ivan Tcherezov	Russia	36:09.2	3 (0+2+0+1)	+33.5
6	10	Dominik Landertinger	Austria	36:09.7	4 (1+0+1+2)	+34.0
7	1	Vincent Jay	France	36:10.3	1 (0+0+0+1)	+34.6
8	7	Jakov Fak	Slovenia	36:10.5	3 (1+0+1+1)	+34.8
9	14	Michael Greis	Germany	36:10.7	3 (0+0+1+2)	+35.0
10	24	Tomasz Sikora	Poland	36:13.1	3 (2+1+0+0)	+37.4
11	2	Björn Ferry	Sweden	36:13.3	2 (0+0+0+2)	+37.6
12	3	Emil Hegle Svendsen	Norway	36:20.7	3 (0+0+1+2)	+45.0
13	11	Simon Fourcade	France	36:28.1	1 (0+1+0+0)	+52.4
14	23	Andreas Birnbacher	Germany	36:30.2	3 (0+1+2+0)	+54.5
15	26	Michal Šlesingr	Czech Republic	36:35.6	2 (1+1+0+0)	+59.9
16	13	Arnd Peiffer	Germany	36:44.5	2 (0+0+2+0)	+1:08.8
17	15	Tim Burke	United States	36:44.7	4 (0+0+3+1)	+1:09.0
18	30	Halvard Hanevold	Norway	36:56.6	3 (0+1+0+2)	+1:20.9
19	6	Sergey Novikov	Belarus	36:59.3	3 (0+0+1+2)	+1:23.6
20	27	Serhiy Sednev	Ukraine	37:02.8	2 (0+0+2+0)	+1:27.1
21	18	Anton Shipulin	Russia	37:04.7	3 (1+0+1+1)	+1:29.0
22	29	Christoph Stephan	Germany	37:11.4	4 (0+1+1+2)	+1:35.7
23	22	Thomas Frei	Switzerland	37:12.9	2 (0+1+1+0)	+1:37.2
24	9	Simon Eder	Austria	37:29.7	4 (0+0+2+2)	+1:54.0
25	25	Andriy Deryzemlya	Ukraine	37:43.9	5 (0+2+3+0)	+2:08.2
26	5	Ole Einar Bjørndalen	Norway	37:46.5	7 (1+2+3+1)	+2:10.8
27	21	Klemen Bauer	Slovenia	38:16.9	5 (2+0+0+3)	+2:41.2
28	28	Jeremy Teela	United States	38:36.1	4 (1+1+0+2)	+3:00.4
29	20	Jean-Philippe Leguellec	Canada	39:18.5	7 (0+4+0+3)	+3:42.8
-	~~8~~	~~Evgeny Ustyugov~~	~~Russia~~	~~35:35.7~~	DSQ	
