= Speed skating at the 2010 Winter Olympics – Women's team pursuit =

Women's team pursuit at the XXI Olympic Winter Games
- Venue: Richmond Olympic Oval
- Dates: 26–27 February 2010

Medalists
1st place, gold medalist(s)		Daniela Anschütz-Thoms, Stephanie Beckert, Anni Friesinger-Postma, Katrin Mattscherodt	Germany
2nd place, silver medalist(s)		Masako Hozumi, Nao Kodaira, Maki Tabata	Japan
3rd place, bronze medalist(s)		Katarzyna Bachleda-Curuś, Katarzyna Woźniak, Luiza Złotkowska	Poland

The women's team pursuit speed skating competition of the Vancouver 2010 Olympics was held at Richmond Olympic Oval on 26 and 27 February 2010.

== Records ==
Prior to this competition, the existing world and Olympic records were as follows.

World record	Canada; Christine Nesbitt; Kristina Groves; Brittany Schussler	2:55.79	Calgary, Canada	6 December 2009
Olympic record	Canada; Christine Nesbitt; Kristina Groves; Cindy Klassen	3:01.24	Turin, Italy	15 February 2006

== Results ==
=== Bracket ===
Quarterfinal
1	Canada	3:02.24
7	United States	3:02.19
5	Netherlands	3:03.38
4	Germany	3:01.95
3	Japan	3:02.89
6	South Korea	3:07.45
8	Poland	3:02.90
2	Russia	3:04.86

Semifinal
7	United States	3:03.78
4	Germany	3:03.55
3	Japan	3:02.73
8	Poland	3:02.92

Final
4	Germany	3:02.82
3	Japan	3:02.84
Third place
7	United States	3:05.30
8	Poland	3:03.73

=== Quarterfinals ===
Rank	Country	Name	Time	Deficit	Notes
Quarterfinal 1
1	Japan	Masako Hozumi; Nao Kodaira; Maki Tabata	3:02.89		Semifinal 1
2	South Korea	Lee Ju-Youn; Noh Seon-Yeong; Park Do-Yeong	3:07.45	+4.56	Final D
Quarterfinal 2
1	Poland	Katarzyna Bachleda-Curuś; Katarzyna Woźniak; Luiza Złotkowska	3:02.90		Semifinal 1
2	Russia	Galina Likhachova; Yekaterina Lobysheva; Yekaterina Shikhova	3:04.86	+1.96	Final D
Quarterfinal 3
1	Germany	Daniela Anschütz-Thoms; Stephanie Beckert; Anni Friesinger-Postma	3:01.95		Semifinal 2
2	Netherlands	Renate Groenewold; Diane Valkenburg; Ireen Wüst	3:03.38	+1.43	Final C
Quarterfinal 4
1	United States	Jennifer Rodriguez; Jilleanne Rookard; Nancy Swider-Peltz, Jr	3:02.19		Semifinal 2
2	Canada	Kristina Groves; Christine Nesbitt; Brittany Schussler	3:02.24	+0.05	Final C

=== Semifinals ===
Rank	Country	Name	Time	Deficit	Notes
Semifinal 1
1	Japan	Masako Hozumi; Nao Kodaira; Maki Tabata	3:02.73		Final A
2	Poland	Katarzyna Bachleda-Curuś; Katarzyna Woźniak; Luiza Złotkowska	3:02.92	+0.19	Final B
Semifinal 2
1	Germany	Daniela Anschütz-Thoms; Stephanie Beckert; Anni Friesinger-Postma	3:03.55		Final A
2	United States	Jennifer Rodriguez; Jilleanne Rookard; Nancy Swider-Peltz, Jr	3:03.78	+0.23	Final B

=== Finals ===
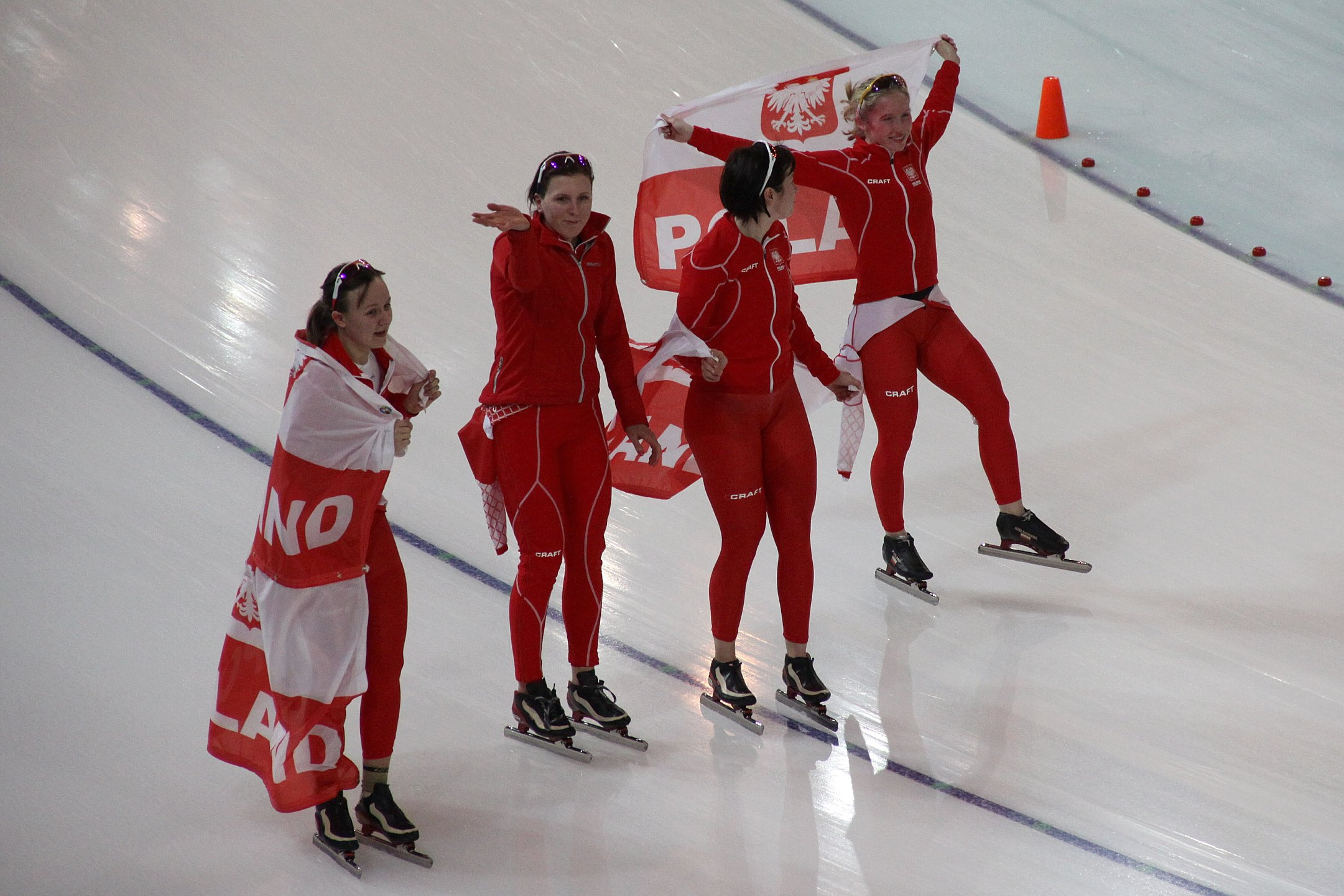
Poland won the bronze medal

Rank	Country	Name	Time	Deficit	Notes
Final A
1st place, gold medalist(s)	Germany	Daniela Anschütz-Thoms; Stephanie Beckert; Katrin Mattscherodt	3:02.82		
2nd place, silver medalist(s)	Japan	Masako Hozumi; Nao Kodaira; Maki Tabata	3:02.84	+0.02	
Final B
3rd place, bronze medalist(s)	Poland	Katarzyna Bachleda-Curuś; Katarzyna Woźniak; Luiza Złotkowska	3:03.73		
4	United States	Catherine Raney-Norman; Jennifer Rodriguez; Jilleanne Rookard	3:05.30	+1.57	
Final C
5	Canada	Kristina Groves; Christine Nesbitt; Brittany Schussler	3:01.41		
6	Netherlands	Diane Valkenburg; Jorien Voorhuis; Ireen Wüst	3:02.04	+0.63	
Final D
7	Russia	Yekaterina Lobysheva; Alla Shabanova; Yekaterina Shikhova	3:06.47		
8	South Korea	Lee Ju-Youn; Noh Seon-Young; Park Do-Yeong	3:06.96	+0.49	
