= Speed skating at the 2010 Winter Olympics – Women's 500 metres =

Women's 500 metres at the XXI Olympic Winter Games
- Venue: Richmond Olympic Oval
- Date: 16 February 2010
- Competitors: 36 from 14 nations
- Winning time: 76.09

Medalists
1st place, gold medalist(s)		Lee Sang-hwa	South Korea
2nd place, silver medalist(s)		Jenny Wolf	Germany
3rd place, bronze medalist(s)		Wang Beixing	China

The women's 500 metres speed skating competition of the 2010 Winter Olympics was held at the Richmond Olympic Oval on 16 February 2010.

== Records ==
Prior to this competition, the existing world and Olympic records were as follows.

500 meters (1 race)

World record	Jenny Wolf (GER)	37.00	Salt Lake City, United States	11 December 2009
Olympic record	Catriona Le May Doan (CAN)	37.30	Salt Lake City, United States	13 February 2002

500 meters x 2 (2 races)

World record	Jenny Wolf (GER)	74.420	Salt Lake City, United States	10 March 2007
Olympic record	Catriona Le May Doan (CAN)	74.750	Salt Lake City, United States	14 February 2002

No new world or Olympic records were set during this competition.

== Results ==
Rank	Name	Country	Pair	Lane	Race 1	Rank	Pair	Lane	Race 2	Rank	Total	Time behind
1st place, gold medalist(s)	Lee Sang-hwa	South Korea	17	o	38.249	1	18	i	37.850	2	76.09	0.00
2nd place, silver medalist(s)	Jenny Wolf	Germany	17	i	38.307	2	18	o	37.838	1	76.14	+0.05
3rd place, bronze medalist(s)	Wang Beixing	China	15	o	38.487	3	17	i	38.144	3	76.63	+0.54
4	Margot Boer	Netherlands	18	i	38.511	4	17	o	38.365	4	76.87	+0.78
5	Sayuri Yoshii	Japan	15	i	38.566	6	16	o	38.432	5	76.99	+0.90
6	Heather Richardson	United States	14	i	38.698	9	14	o	38.477	6	77.17	+1.08
7	Zhang Shuang	China	12	o	38.530	5	16	i	38.807	13	77.33	+1.24
8	Jin Peiyu	China	9	i	38.686	8	15	o	38.711	11	77.45	+1.36
9	Ko Hyon-Suk	North Korea	2	i	38.893	15	10	o	38.577	7	77.47	+1.38
10	Christine Nesbitt	Canada	11	o	38.881	13	13	i	38.694	8	77.57	+1.48
11	Monique Angermüller	Germany	7	i	38.761	10	13	o	38.830	14	77.59	+1.50
12	Nao Kodaira	Japan	16	i	38.835	12	12	o	38.797	12	77.63	+1.54
13	Xing Aihua	China	13	o	38.792	11	14	i	38.849	16	77.64	+1.55
14	Shihomi Shinya	Japan	14	o	38.964	16	12	i	38.765	10	77.72	+1.63
15	Thijsje Oenema	Netherlands	13	i	38.892	14	11	o	38.869	17	77.76	+1.67
16	Tomomi Okazaki	Japan	12	i	38.971	17	9	o	39.060	20	78.03	+1.94
17	Elli Ochowicz	United States	11	i	39.002	18	8	o	39.048	19	78.05	+1.96
18	Yekaterina Aydova	Kazakhstan	6	o	39.024	19	11	i	39.116	22	78.140	+2.05
19	Laurine van Riessen	Netherlands	10	o	39.302	21	9	i	38.845	15	78.147	+2.05
20	Olga Fatkulina	Russia	10	i	39.359	24	7	o	39.077	21	78.43	+2.34
21	Jennifer Rodriguez	United States	3	o	39.182	20	10	i	39.281	24	78.46	+2.37
22	Svetlana Kaykan	Russia	8	i	39.422	27	5	o	39.210	23	78.63	+2.54
23	Karolína Erbanová	Czech Republic	6	i	39.365	25	6	o	39.321	26	78.68	+2.59
24	Yekaterina Malysheva	Russia	9	o	39.782	32	4	i	38.947	18	78.72	+2.63
25	Chiara Simionato	Italy	4	i	39.480	28	4	o	39.285	25	78.76	+2.67
26	Lee Bo-ra	South Korea	4	o	39.396	26	6	i	39.406	28	78.80	+2.71
27	Shannon Rempel	Canada	7	o	39.351	22	8	i	39.473	29	78.82	+2.73
28	Judith Hesse	Germany	8	o	39.357	23	7	i	39.486	30	78.84	+2.75
29	Sophie Muir	Australia	3	i	39.649	31	2	o	39.400	27	79.04	+2.95
30	Lauren Cholewinski	United States	5	i	39.514	29	3	o	39.587	32	79.10	+3.01
31	An Ji-min	South Korea	5	o	39.595	30	5	i	39.549	31	79.14	+3.05
32	Oh Min-ji	South Korea	1	o	39.816	33	3	i	39.768	33	79.58	+3.49
33	Svetlana Radkevich	Belarus	2	o	39.899	35	2	i	39.854	34	79.753	+3.66
34	Anastasia Bucsis	Canada	1	i	39.879	34	1	o	39.876	35	79.755	+3.66
35	Annette Gerritsen	Netherlands	16	o	97.952	36	1	i	38.709	9	136.66	+60.57
DQ	Yulia Nemaya	Russia	18	o	38.594	7	15	i	108.446	36	147.04	+70.95
