= An Ji-min =

South Korean speed skater

Personal information
- Nationality: South Korean
- Born: 29 April 1992 (age 33); Seoul, South Korea

Sport
- Sport: Speed skating

An Ji-min (born 29 April 1992) is a South Korean speed skater. She competed in the women's 500 metres at the 2010 Winter Olympics.
