= Masako Hozumi =

Japanese speed skater (born 1986)

Medal record

Women's speed skating

Representing Japan

Olympic Games
Silver medal – second place	2010 Vancouver	Team pursuit

World Championships
Bronze medal – third place	2009 Vancouver	Team pursuit

Asian Games
Gold medal – first place	2011 Astana/Almaty	3000 m
Gold medal – first place	2011 Astana/Almaty	5000 m
Silver medal – second place	2007 Changchun	3000 m
Silver medal – second place	2011 Astana/Almaty	Mass start

Asian Championships
Gold medal – first place	2009 Tomakomai	Allround
Gold medal – first place	2010 Obihiro	Allround
Gold medal – first place	2013 Changchun	Allround
Silver medal – second place	2011 Harbin	Allround

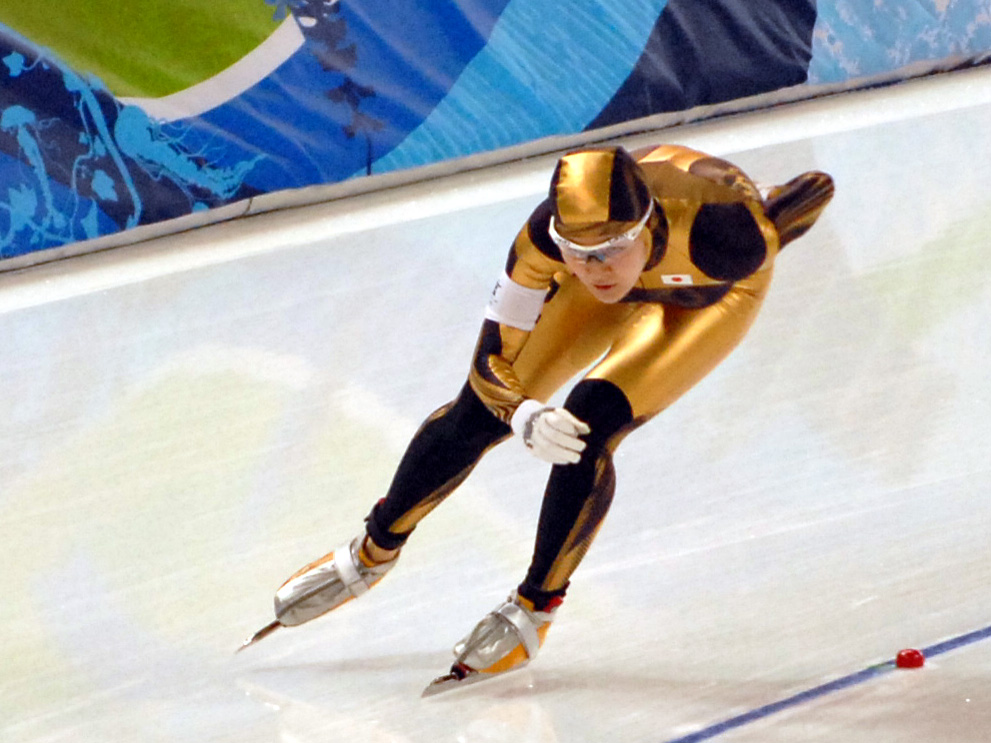
Masako Hozumi at the 2010 Winter Olympics.

Masako Hozumi (Japanese: 穂積 雅子; born 11 September 1986 in Fukushima) is a Japanese speed skater from Hokkaido. In 2009, she finished fourth overall at the 2009 Allround. She competed for Japan at the 2010 and 2014 Winter Olympics.

She is named after Masako Natsume, a famous Japanese actress.
