= FIS Snowboarding World Championships 2011 – Women's parallel giant slalom =

The women's parallel giant slalom competition of the FIS Snowboarding World Championships 2011 was held at La Molina, Spain on January 19, 2011. 53 athletes from 21 countries competed.

== Results ==
=== Qualification ===
The following are the results of the qualification. Each participant takes one run on either of the courses. After the first run, only the top 32 are allowed a second run on the opposite course.

Rank	Bib	Name	Country	Blue Course	Red Course	Overall Time	Notes
1	6	Fränzi Mägert-Kohli	Switzerland	44.57	47.33	1:31.90	Q
2	9	Ekaterina Tudegesheva	Russia	47.46	44.50	1:31.96	Q
3	3	Claudia Riegler	Austria	47.51	45.31	1:32.82	Q
4	22	Corinna Boccacini	Italy	45.50	47.41	1:32.91	Q
5	16	Doris Günther	Austria	45.37	47.67	1:33.04	Q
6	10	Julia Dujmovits	Austria	44.61	48.50	1:33.11	Q
7	4	Amelie Kober	Germany	44.91	48.32	1:33.23	Q
8	5	Alena Zavarzina	Russia	48.37	44.89	1:33.26	Q
9	11	Isabella Laböck	Germany	48.11	45.30	1:33.41	Q
10	13	Patrizia Kummer	Switzerland	47.69	45.84	1:33.53	Q
11	8	Nathalie Desmares	France	45.59	47.97	1:33.56	Q
12	1	Svetlana Boldykova	Russia	48.36	45.40	1:33.76	Q
13	18	Selina Jörg	Germany	45.59	48.17	1:33.76	Q
14	12	Marion Kreiner	Austria	45.38	48.46	1:33.84	Q
15	7	Nicolien Sauerbreij	Netherlands	48.37	46.00	1:34.37	Q
16	14	Ina Meschik	Austria	46.05	48.42	1:34.47	Q
17	23	Annamari Chundak	Ukraine	47.50	47.14	1:34.64	
18	37	Ilona Ruotsalainen	Finland	47.35	47.50	1:34.85	
19	15	Ekaterina Ilyukhina	Russia	48.24	46.77	1:35.01	
20	20	Tomoka Takeuchi	Japan	45.66	49.45	1:35.11	
21	17	Caroline Calve	Canada	48.42	46.74	1:35.16	
22	19	Julie Zogg	Switzerland	48.60	46.71	1:35.31	
23	31	Gloria Kotnik	Slovenia	48.43	46.88	1:35.31	
24	32	Aleksandra Krol	Poland	46.93	49.44	1:36.37	
25	25	Ariane Lavigne	Canada	49.30	47.23	1:36.53	
26	36	Madeline Wiencke	United States	47.33	49.38	1:36.71	
27	46	Nina Mićić	Serbia	46.52	50.39	1:36.91	
28	28	Ekaterina Zavialova	Canada	47.30	49.76	1:37.06	
29	41	Valeriya Tsoy	Kazakhstan	49.09	48.82	1:37.91	
30	27	Vanessa Cusini	Italy	50.69	47.30	1:37.99	
31	24	Lindsay Lloyd	United States	47.87	50.12	1:37.99	
32	34	Eri Yanetani	Japan	47.46	57.38	1:44.84	
33	40	Ester Ledecka	Czech Republic	48.45		48.45	
34	2	Camille de Faucompret	France	49.30		49.30	
35	38	Petra Elsterova	Czech Republic	49.60		49.60	
36	51	Niu Jiaqi	China		50.64	50.64	
37	43	Teodora Pentcheva	Bulgaria		50.88	50.88	
38	49	Li Xiaotong	China		51.00	51.00	
39	44	Iva Polanec	Slovenia	51.38		51.38	
40	29	Natalie Egger	Italy		51.55	51.55	
41	50	Zhang Xiao	China	51.78		51.78	
42	47	Jana Sindelarova	Czech Republic		51.81	51.81	
43	33	Lynn Ott	United States		52.45	52.45	
44	52	Gang Hye-Yun	South Korea	53.66		53.66	
45	42	Shin Da-Hae	South Korea	53.69		53.69	
46	53	Xu Xiaoxiao	China		55.64	55.64	
	21	Anke Carstens	Germany		DSQ	DSQ	
	35	Paulina Wozniak	Poland		DSQ	DSQ	
	30	Hilde-Katrine Engeli	Norway	DNF		DNF	
	45	Marieke Sauerbreij	Netherlands		DNF	DNF	
	26	Heather Herde	United States	DNS		DNS	
	39	Olga Fedak	Ukraine		DNS	DNS	
	48	Yuliya Hrechyn	Ukraine	DNS		DNS	

=== Elimination round ===
Round of 16
1	Mägert-Kohli (SUI)
16	Meschik (AUT)	+2.71
8	Zavarzina (RUS)
9	Laböck (GER)	+0.75
5	Günther (AUT)
12	Boldykova (RUS)	+0.66
13	Jörg (GER)
4	Boccacini (ITA)	+5.73
3	Riegler (AUT)
14	Kreiner (AUT)	+0.15
11	Desmares (FRA)
6	Dujmovits (AUT)	+0.29
7	Kober (GER)
10	Kummer (SUI)	+5.51
2	Tudegesheva (RUS)
15	Sauerbreij (NED)	+0.80

Quarterfinals
8	Zavarzina (RUS)
1	Mägert-Kohli (SUI)	+0.16
5	Günther (AUT)
13	Jörg (GER)	+0.18
3	Riegler (AUT)
11	Desmares (FRA)	+0.67
7	Kober (GER)
2	Tudegesheva (RUS)	+0.30

Semifinals
8	Zavarzina (RUS)
5	Günther (AUT)	+1.44
3	Riegler (AUT)
7	Kober (GER)	+0.20

Finals
8	Zavarzina (RUS)
3	Riegler (AUT)	+8.83
Third place
5	Günther (AUT)
7	Kober (GER)	+0.04
