= FIS Snowboarding World Championships 2011 – Women's parallel slalom =

The women's parallel slalom competition of the FIS Snowboarding World Championships 2011 was held at La Molina, Spain on January 22, 2011. 49 athletes from 21 countries competed.

== Results ==
=== Qualification ===
The following are the results of the qualification. Each participant takes one run on either of the courses. After the first run, only the top 32 are allowed a second run on the opposite course.

Rank	Bib	Name	Country	Blue Course	Red Course	Overall Time	Notes
1	11	Ekaterina Tudegesheva	Russia	35.86	35.81	1:11.67	Q
2	8	Marion Kreiner	Austria	36.07	35.65	1:11.72	Q
3	13	Julia Dujmovits	Austria	36.72	35.50	1:12.22	Q
4	3	Amelie Kober	Germany	37.12	35.22	1:12.34	Q
5	5	Heidi Neururer	Austria	37.00	35.59	1:12.59	Q
6	7	Ekaterina Ilyukhina	Russia	37.00	35.62	1:12.62	Q
7	10	Claudia Riegler	Austria	36.36	36.86	1:13.22	Q
8	2	Nicolien Sauerbreij	Netherlands	35.83	37.44	1:13.27	Q
9	20	Anke Karstens	Germany	36.17	37.20	1:13.37	Q
10	19	Tomoka Takeuchi	Japan	36.91	36.46	1:13.37	Q
11	28	Hilde-Katrine Engeli	Norway	36.70	36.71	1:13.41	Q
12	18	Julie Zogg	Switzerland	36.99	36.44	1:13.43	Q
13	22	Annamari Chundak	Ukraine	36.66	36.77	1:13.43	Q
14	15	Fränzi Mägert-Kohli	Switzerland	37.21	36.24	1:13.45	Q
15	14	Patrizia Kummer	Switzerland	36.28	37.22	1:13.50	Q
16	9	Nathalie Desmares	France	37.30	36.44	1:13.74	Q
17	21	Corinna Boccacini	Italy	37.73	36.23	1:13.96	
18	4	Caroline Calve	Canada	36.82	37.35	1:14.17	
19	17	Selina Jörg	Germany	37.72	36.61	1:14.33	
20	6	Svetlana Boldykova	Russia	36.02	38.60	1:14.62	
21	35	Ilona Ruotsalainen	Finland	37.39	37.37	1:14.76	
22	24	Ariane Lavigne	Canada	37.33	37.60	1:14.93	
23	29	Gloria Kotnik	Slovenia	38.22	37.05	1:15.27	
24	27	Natalie Egger	Italy	37.96	37.37	1:15.33	
25	42	Marieke Sauerbreij	Netherlands	37.07	38.79	1:15.86	
26	32	Eri Yanetani	Japan	38.17	38.06	1:16.23	
27	34	Madeline Wiencke	United States	38.29	38.04	1:16.33	
28	1	Isabella Laböck	Germany	40.99	36.28	1:17.27	
29	25	Vanessa Cusini	Italy	38.85	38.69	1:17.54	
30	23	Lindsay Lloyd	United States	42.76	37.96	1:20.72	
31	12	Camille de Faucompret	France	36.09	DSQ	-	
32	16	Alena Zavarzina	Russia	35.79	DNS	-	
33	38	Valeriya Tsoy	Kazakhstan	38.54		38.54	
34	43	Nina Mićić	Serbia		38.71	38.71	
35	26	Ekaterina Zavialova	Canada	38.85		38.85	
36	33	Paulina Wozniak	Poland		38.92	38.92	
37	40	Teodora Pentcheva	Bulgaria	39.02		39.02	
38	39	Shin Da-Hae	South Korea		39.08	39.08	
39	30	Aleksandra Krol	Poland	39.11		39.11	
40	37	Ester Ledecka	Czech Republic		39.36	39.36	
41	46	Niu Jiaqi	China	39.41		39.41	
42	41	Iva Polanec	Slovenia		40.71	40.71	
43	44	Jana Sindelarova	Czech Republic	40.82		40.82	
44	36	Petra Elsterova	Czech Republic	40.88		40.88	
45	45	Li Xiaotong	China		41.36	41.36	
46	49	Gang Hye-Yun	South Korea		44.09	44.09	
47	48	Xu Xiaoxiao	China	47.02		47.02	
	47	Zhang Xiao	China		DSQ	DSQ	
	31	Lynn Ott	United States			DNF	

=== Elimination round ===
Round of 16
1	Tudegesheva (RUS)
16	Desmares (FRA)	+0.94
8	Sauerbreij (NED)
9	Karstens (GER)	+0.01
5	Neururer (AUT)
12	Zogg (SUI)	+0.22
4	Kober (GER)
13	Chundak (UKR)	+0.43
14	Mägert-Kohli (SUI)
3	Dujmovits (AUT)	+5.83
11	Engeli (NOR)
6	Ilyukhina (RUS)	+0.13
7	Riegler (AUT)
10	Takeuchi (JPN)	+0.12
15	Kummer (SUI)
2	Kreiner (AUT)	+7.97

Quarterfinals
8	Sauerbreij (NED)
1	Tudegesheva (RUS)	+2.92
5	Neururer (AUT)
4	Kober (GER)	+0.38
11	Engeli (NOR)
14	Mägert-Kohli (SUI)	+0.20
7	Riegler (AUT)
15	Kummer (SUI)	+5.64

Semifinals
8	Sauerbreij (NED)
5	Neururer (AUT)	+0.18
11	Engeli (NOR)
7	Riegler (AUT)	+0.69

Finals
11	Engeli (NOR)
8	Sauerbreij (NED)	+0.92
Third place
7	Riegler (AUT)
5	Neururer (AUT)	+0.86
