= Austria at the 2010 Winter Olympics =

- IOC code: AUT
- NOC: Austrian Olympic Committee
- Website: www.olympia.at (in German)

in Vancouver
- Competitors: 80 in 13 sports
- Flag bearers: Andreas and Wolfgang Linger (opening); Nina Reithmayer (closing)
- Medals Ranked 9th: Gold 4 Silver 6 Bronze 7 Total 17

Winter Olympics appearances (overview)
- 1924; 1928; 1932; 1936; 1948; 1952; 1956; 1960; 1964; 1968; 1972; 1976; 1980; 1984; 1988; 1992; 1994; 1998; 2002; 2006; 2010; 2014; 2018; 2022; 2026

Austria participated at the 2010 Winter Olympics in Vancouver, British Columbia, Canada.

== Medalists ==
Medal	Name	Sport	Event	Date
Gold	Andreas Linger, Wolfgang Linger	Luge	Doubles	17 February
Gold	Andrea Fischbacher	Alpine skiing	Women's super-G	20 February
Gold	Wolfgang Loitzl, Andreas Kofler, Thomas Morgenstern, Gregor Schlierenzauer	Ski jumping	Large hill team	22 February
Gold	Bernhard Gruber, David Kreiner, Felix Gottwald, Mario Stecher	Nordic combined	Team large hill/4 x 5 km	23 February
Silver	Christoph Sumann	Biathlon	Men's pursuit	16 February
Silver	Nina Reithmeyer	Luge	Women's singles	16 February
Silver	Andreas Matt	Freestyle skiing	Men's ski cross	21 February
Silver	Simon Eder, Daniel Mesotitsch, Dominik Landertinger, Christoph Sumann	Biathlon	Men's relay	26 February
Silver	Marlies Schild	Alpine skiing	Women's slalom	26 February
Silver	Benjamin Karl	Snowboarding	Men's parallel giant slalom	27 February
Bronze	Gregor Schlierenzauer	Ski jumping	Normal hill	13 February
Bronze	Elisabeth Görgl	Alpine skiing	Women's downhill	17 February
Bronze	Gregor Schlierenzauer	Ski jumping	Large hill	20 February
Bronze	Elisabeth Görgl	Alpine skiing	Women's giant slalom	24 February
Bronze	Bernhard Gruber	Nordic combined	Individual large hill/10 km	25 February
Bronze	Marion Kreiner	Snowboarding	Women's parallel giant slalom	26 February

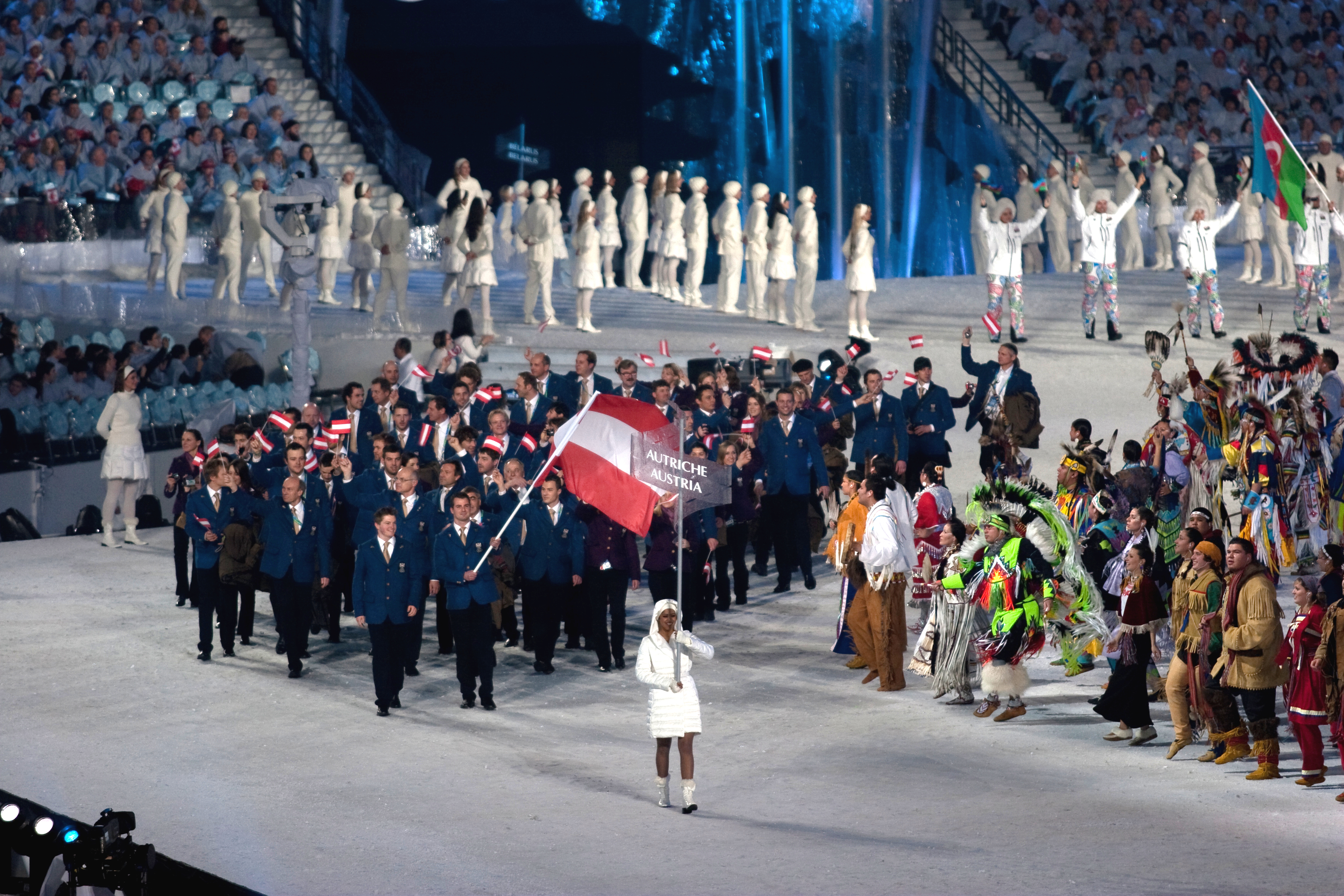
The athletes entering the stadium during the opening ceremonies.

== Alpine skiing ==
Athlete	Event	Run 1	Run 2	Final	
Athlete	Event	Time	Time	Time	Rank
Romed Baumann	Men's super combined	DNF	did not advance		
Romed Baumann	Men's giant slalom	1:17.29	1:21.51	2.38.80	5
Eva-Maria Brem	Women's giant slalom	1:15.38	1:12.24	2:27.62	7
Anna Fenninger	Women's downhill			1:49.95	25
Anna Fenninger	Women's super combined	1:27.19	46.08	2:13.27	16
Anna Fenninger	Women's super-G			1:22.30	16
Andrea Fischbacher	Women's downhill			1:45.68	4
Andrea Fischbacher	Women's super-G			1:20.14	1st place, gold medalist(s)
Elisabeth Görgl	Women's downhill			1:45.65	3rd place, bronze medalist(s)
Elisabeth Görgl	Women's super combined	1:25.60	47.98	2:13.58	18
Elisabeth Görgl	Women's super-G			1:21.14	5
Elisabeth Görgl	Women's slalom	53.01	51.96	1:44.97	7
Elisabeth Görgl	Women's giant slalom	1:15.12	1:12.13	2:27.25	3rd place, bronze medalist(s)
Johann Grugger	Men's downhill			1:55.81	22
Reinfried Herbst	Men's slalom	49.23	51.55	1:40.78	10
Marcel Hirscher	Men's giant slalom	1:17.48	1:21.04	2:38.52	4
Marcel Hirscher	Men's slalom	48.92	51.28	1:40.20	5
Michaela Kirchgasser	Women's super combined	1:27.09	44.26	2:11.35	9
Michaela Kirchgasser	Women's slalom	52.31	DNF		
Michaela Kirchgasser	Women's giant slalom	1:16.26	1:12.14	2:28.40	15
Klaus Kröll	Men's downhill			1:54.87	9
Regina Mader	Women's downhill			1:47.53	14
Manfred Pranger	Men's slalom	DNF	did not advance		
Benjamin Raich	Men's super combined	1:54.70	51.43	2:46.13	6
Benjamin Raich	Men's super-G			1:31.35	14
Benjamin Raich	Men's slalom	48.33	51.48	1:39.81	4
Benjamin Raich	Men's giant slalom	1:17.66	1:21.17	2:38.83	6
Mario Scheiber	Men's downhill			1:54.52	4
Mario Scheiber	Men's super-G			1:31.93	20
Marlies Schild	Women's slalom	51.40	51.92	1:43.32	2nd place, silver medalist(s)
Nicole Schmidhofer	Women's super-G			DNF	
Philipp Schörghofer	Men's giant slalom	1:18.37	1:21.00	2:39.37	12
Georg Streitberger	Men's super-G			1:31.49	17
Georg Streitberger	Men's super combined	1:55.55	DNS		
Michael Walchhofer	Men's downhill			1:54.88	10
Michael Walchhofer	Men's super-G			1:32.00	21
Kathrin Zettel	Women's super combined	1:26.01	44.49	2:10.50	4
Kathrin Zettel	Women's slalom	52.59	53.00	1:45.59	13
Kathrin Zettel	Women's giant slalom	1:15.28	1:12.25	2:27.53	5

Stefanie Köhle, Mario Matt and Hannes Reichelt were withdrawn from the squad prior to the opening ceremony.

== Biathlon ==
Athlete	Event	Final			
Athlete	Event	Ski time	Misses	Final time	Rank
Simon Eder	Men's individual	47:41.7	2	49:41.7	6
Simon Eder	Men's sprint		0	25:32.2	11
Simon Eder	Men's pursuit		3	34:09.4	4
Simon Eder	Men's mass start		4	37:29.7	25
Dominik Landertinger	Men's individual	48:00.8	4	52:00.8	23
Dominik Landertinger	Men's sprint		4	26:23.7	34
Dominik Landertinger	Men's pursuit		3	35:06.7	14
Dominik Landertinger	Men's mass start		4	36:09.7	7
Daniel Mesotitsch	Men's individual	48:32.0	2	50:32.0	9
Daniel Mesotitsch	Men's sprint		2	26:45.3	45
Daniel Mesotitsch	Men's pursuit		4	36:56.0	41
Daniel Mesotitsch	Men's mass start		3	36:05.9	5
Christoph Sumann	Men's individual	47:04.9	3	50:04.9	8
Christoph Sumann	Men's sprint		2	25:32.7	12
Christoph Sumann	Men's pursuit		2	33:54.9	2nd place, silver medalist(s)
Christoph Sumann	Men's mass start		1	36:01.6	4

Athletes	Event	Penalties			Final	
Athletes	Event	Prone	Standing	Total	Time	Rank
Austria; Simon Eder; Daniel Mesotitsch; Dominik Landertinger; Christoph Sumann	Men's relay	1; 0; 0; 0; 1	8; 1; 3; 1; 3	9; 1; 3; 1; 4	1:22:16.7; 20:10.0; 20:38.0; 20:25.9; 21:02.8	2nd place, silver medalist(s)

Tobias Eberhard and Friedrich Pinter were named in the squad but did not compete.

== Bobsleigh ==
Team	Event	Final					
Team	Event	Run 1	Run 2	Run 3	Run 4	Time	Rank
Wolfgang Stampfer; Jürgen Mayer	Two-man	DSQ	did not advance				
Jürgen Loacker; Christian Hackl	Two-man	52.55	52.86	52.73	52.64	3:30.78	18
Wolfgang Stampfer; Christian Hackl; Jürgen Mayer; Johannes Wipplinger	Four-man	53.64	DNS				

== Cross-country skiing ==
Athlete	Event	Qualification		Quarterfinals		Semifinals		Final	
Athlete	Event	Time	Rank	Time	Rank	Time	Rank	Time	Rank
Katerina Smutna	Women's sprint	3:45.03	12 Q	3:40.5	2 Q	3:45.1	6	did not advance	11
Katerina Smutna	Women's 15 km pursuit							42:50.3	29
Katerina Smutna	Women's 30 km classical							1:37:51.3	33

== Figure skating ==
Athlete(s)	Event	CD		SP/OD		FS/FD		Total	
Athlete(s)	Event	Points	Rank	Points	Rank	Points	Rank	Points	Rank
Viktor Pfeifer	Men's			60.88	23	115.05	20	175.93	21
Miriam Ziegler	Ladies'			43.84	26	did not advance			26

== Freestyle skiing ==
Men's team – ski cross

Athlete	Event	Qualifying		1/8 final	Quarterfinal	Semifinal	Final	
Athlete	Event	Time	Rank	Rank	Rank	Rank	Final	Rank
Patrick Koller	Ski cross	1:15.22	28 Q	4	did not advance			30
Andreas Matt	Ski cross	1:13.13	4 Q	2 Q	2 Q	2 Q	Big final 2	2nd place, silver medalist(s)
Markus Wittner	Ski cross	1:15.91	30 Q	2 Q	4	did not advance		15
Thomas Zangerl	Ski cross	1:13.44	6 Q	3	did not advance			18

Women's team – aerials and moguls

Athlete	Event	Qualifying		Final	
Athlete	Event	Points	Rank	Points	Rank
Margarita Marbler	Moguls	23.77	8 Q	23.69	6

Women's team – ski cross

Athlete	Event	Qualifying		1/8 final	Quarterfinal	Semifinal	Final	
Athlete	Event	Time	Rank	Rank	Rank	Rank	Final	Rank
Katharina Gutensohn	Ski cross	1:21.26	25 Q	3	did not advance			26
Karin Huttary	Ski cross	1:18.84	8 Q	1 Q	1 Q	1 Q	Big final 4	4
Andrea Limbacher	Ski cross	1:20.86	23 Q	4 DNF	did not advance			24
Katrin Ofner	Ski cross	1:20.61	22 Q	3	did not advance			23

== Luge ==
Athlete	Event	Finals					
Athlete	Event	Run 1	Run 2	Run 3	Run 4	Time	Rank
Veronika Halder	Women's singles	42.015	41.881	42.078	42.143	2:48.117	12
Nina Reithmayer	Women's singles	41.728	41.563	41.884	41.839	2:47.014	2nd place, silver medalist(s)
Wolfgang Kindl	Men's singles	48.707	48.755	49.080	48.673	3:15.215	9
Daniel Pfister	Men's singles	48.583	48.707	48.883	48.553	3:14.726	6
Manuel Pfister	Men's singles	48.677	48.835	49.064	48.693	3:15.269	10
Andreas Linger; Wolfgang Linger	Men's doubles	41.332	41.373			1:22.705	1st place, gold medalist(s)
Markus Schiegl; Tobias Schiegl	Men's doubles	41.727	41.801			1:23.528	8

== Nordic combined ==
Athlete	Event	Ski jumping		Cross-country		Final	
Athlete	Event	Points	Rank	Deficit	Ski time	Total time	Rank
Christoph Bieler	Normal hill/10 km	125.0	3	0:42	26:32.0	27:14.0	25
Christoph Bieler	Large hill/10 km	116.8	4	0:41	25:40.7	26:21.7	10
Felix Gottwald	Normal hill/10 km	102.5	41	2:12	24:20.2	26:32.2	14
Felix Gottwald	Large hill/10 km	78.8	40	3:13	24:29.4	27:42.4	17
Bernhard Gruber	Large hill/10 km	127.0	1	0:00	25:43.7	25:43.7	3rd place, bronze medalist(s)
David Kreiner	Normal hill/10 km	117.5	20	1:12	25:24.5	26:36.5	15
Mario Stecher	Normal hill/10 km	122.5	7	0:52	25:08.7	26:00.7	5
Mario Stecher	Large hill/10 km	109.8	10	1:09	25:12.1	26:21.1	8
Austria; Mario Stecher; David Kreiner; Bernhard Gruber; Felix Gottwald	Team large hill/4 x 5 km	479.9; 121.7; 114.7; 131.0; 112.5	3	0:36	48:55.6; 11:57.7; 11:49.0; 12:04.3; 13:04.6	49:31.6	1st place, gold medalist(s)

== Short track speed skating ==
Athlete	Event	Heat		Quarterfinal		Semifinal		Final		Ranking
Athlete	Event	Time	Rank	Time	Rank	Time	Rank	Time	Rank	Ranking
Veronika Windisch	Women's 1000 metres	1:32.775	3	did not advance						22
Veronika Windisch	Women's 1500 metres	2:24.440	5			did not advance				25

== Skeleton ==
Athlete	Event	Final					
Athlete	Event	Run 1	Run 2	Run 3	Run 4	Total	Rank
Matthias Guggenberger	Men's	52.75	53.02	53.03	53.01	3:31.81	8

== Ski jumping ==
Athlete	Event	Qualifying		First round		Final		
Athlete	Event	Points	Rank	Points	Rank	Points	Total	Rank
Andreas Kofler	Normal hill	Prequalified		121.0	17 Q	120.5	241.5	19
Andreas Kofler	Large hill	Prequalified		127.2	4 Q	134.0	261.2	4
Wolfgang Loitzl	Normal hill	Prequalified		124.5	12 Q	130.5	255.0	11
Wolfgang Loitzl	Large hill	Prequalified		124.1	6 Q	106.2	230.3	10
Thomas Morgenstern	Normal hill	Prequalified		130.0	4 Q	128.5	258.5	8
Thomas Morgenstern	Large hill	Prequalified		123.6	7 Q	123.1	246.7	5
Gregor Schlierenzauer	Normal hill	Prequalified		128.0	7 Q	140.0	268.0	3rd place, bronze medalist(s)
Gregor Schlierenzauer	Large hill	Prequalified		125.4	5 Q	136.8	262.2	3rd place, bronze medalist(s)
Austria; Wolfgang Loitzl; Andreas Kofler; Thomas Morgenstern; Gregor Schlierenzauer	Large hill team			547.3; 140.4; 126.1; 135.9; 144.9	1 Q	560.6; 141.8; 138.6; 135.0; 145.2	1107.9	1st place, gold medalist(s)

Martin Koch was named in the squad but did not compete.

== Snowboarding ==
Men's snowboard cross

Athlete	Event	Qualification		1/8 finals	Quarterfinals	Semifinals	Finals	
Athlete	Event	Time	Rank	Rank	Rank	Rank	Final	Rank
Mario Fuchs	Snowboard cross	1:21.53	5 Q	2 Q	1 Q	4 q	Small final 3	7
Lukas Gruner	Snowboard cross	1:22.04	12 Q	1 Q	2 Q	3 q	Small final 2	6
Markus Schairer	Snowboard cross	1:23.33	21 Q	3	did not advance			23

Men's parallel giant slalom

Athlete	Event	Qualification		Round of 16	Quarterfinals	Semifinals	Finals	
Athlete	Event	Qualification		Round of 16	Quarterfinals	5-8 rankings		Rank
Athlete	Event	Time	Rank	Opposition Time	Opposition Time	Opposition Time	Opposition Time	Rank
Siegfried Grabner	Parallel giant slalom	DNF		did not advance				30
Benjamin Karl	Parallel giant slalom	1:17.45	4 Q	Aaron March (ITA); W −2.27	Zan Kosir (SLO); W DSQ	Mathieu Bozzetto (FRA); W −2.58	Jasey Jay Anderson (CAN); L +0.35	2nd place, silver medalist(s)
Andreas Promegger	Parallel giant slalom	1:16.49	1 Q	Chris Klug (USA); L DSQ	did not advance			9
Ingemar Walder	Parallel giant slalom	DSQ	29	did not advance				29

Women's snowboard cross

Athlete	Event	Qualification		Quarterfinals	Semifinals	Finals	
Athlete	Event	Time	Rank	Rank	Rank	Final	Rank
Doresia Krings	Snowboard cross	1:28.98	10 Q	3	did not advance		10
Maria Ramberger	Snowboard cross	1:33.08	16 Q	4	did not advance		16
Manuela Riegler	Snowboard cross	DNS					

Women's parallel giant slalom

Athlete	Event	Qualification		Round of 16	Quarterfinals	Semifinals	Finals	
Athlete	Event	Qualification		Round of 16	Quarterfinals	5-8 rankings		Rank
Athlete	Event	Time	Rank	Opposition Time	Opposition Time	Opposition Time	Opposition Time	Rank
Doris Guenther	Parallel giant slalom	1:23.20	3 Q	Selina Joerg (GER); L +0.41	did not advance			9
Marion Kreiner	Parallel giant slalom	1:22.52	1 Q	Annamari Chundak (UKR); W −2.29	Anke Karstens (GER); W −8.34	Ekaterina Ilyukhina (RUS); L +0.14	Small final Selina Joerg (GER); W −2.29	3rd place, bronze medalist(s)
Ina Meschik	Parallel giant slalom	1:24.51	11 Q	Camille de Faucompret (FRA); W −4.88	Selina Joerg (GER); L +0.08	Claudia Riegler (AUT); W −0.91	Anke Karstens (GER); L +0.64	6
Claudia Riegler	Parallel giant slalom	1:23.74	7 Q	Tomoka Takeuchi (JPN); W −12.68	Nicolien Sauerbreij (NED); L +0.30	Ina Meschik (AUT); L +0.91	Amelie Kober (GER); W DNS	7

Heidi Neururer and Anton Unterkofler were originally named in the squad but were withdrawn prior to competition.

== Speed skating ==
Athlete	Event	Race 1		Race 2		Final	
Athlete	Event	Time	Rank	Time	Rank	Time	Rank
Anna Rokita	Women's 1500 m					2:02.67	28
Anna Rokita	Women's 3000 m					4:16.42	16

== See also ==
- Austria at the Olympics
- Austria at the 2010 Winter Paralympics
