= Snowboarding at the 2010 Winter Olympics – Women's parallel giant slalom =

Women's parallel giant slalom at the XXI Olympic Winter Games
- Venue: Cypress Mountain
- Date: February 26, 2010
- Competitors: 30 from 16 nations

Medalists
1st place, gold medalist(s)		Nicolien Sauerbreij	Netherlands
2nd place, silver medalist(s)		Yekaterina Ilyukhina	Russia
3rd place, bronze medalist(s)		Marion Kreiner	Austria

The women's parallel giant slalom competition of the Vancouver 2010 Olympics was held at Cypress Mountain on February 26, 2010.

== Results ==
=== Qualification ===
Rank	Bib	Name	Country	Qual. Pair	Time	Elim. Pair	Time	Total	Notes
1	11	Marion Kreiner	Austria	6	40.63	14	41.89	1:22.52	Q
2	8	Nicolien Sauerbreij	Netherlands	4	41.04	14	42.14	1:23.18	Q
3	1	Doris Guenther	Austria	1	40.52	15	42.68	1:23.20	Q
4	14	Yekaterina Ilyukhina	Russia	7	41.61	11	41.82	1:23.43	Q
5	3	Yekaterina Tudegesheva	Russia	2	41.15	12	42.57	1:23.72	Q
6	21	Camille De Faucompret	France	11	41.35	11	42.38	1:23.73	Q
7	7	Claudia Riegler	Austria	4	41.08	13	42.66	1:23.74	Q
8	23	Anke Karstens	Germany	12	41.59	9	42.31	1:23.90	Q
9	10	Alexa Loo	Canada	5	42.36	7	41.86	1:24.22	Q
10	4	Tomoka Takeuchi	Japan	2	41.61	12	42.81	1:24.42	Q
11	9	Ina Meschik	Austria	5	42.43	7	42.08	1:24.51	Q
12	6	Amelie Kober	Germany	3	41.98	9	42.61	1:24.59	Q
13	2	Michelle Gorgone	United States	1	40.19	15	44.44	1:24.63	Q
14	19	Selina Jörg	Germany	10	42.53	5	42.10	1:24.63	Q
15	17	Isabella Laboeck	Germany	9	42.22	8	42.74	1:24.96	Q
16	25	Annamari Chundak	Ukraine	13	42.46	6	42.98	1:25.44	Q
17	12	Alena Zavarzina	Russia	6	42.04	8	43.47	1:25.51	
18	18	Nathalie Desmares	France	9	41.89	10	43.82	1:25.71	
19	20	Joh Shaw	Australia	10	43.41	5	42.69	1:26.10	
20	15	Caroline Calvé	Canada	8	43.90	1	42.48	1:26.38	
21	22	Eri Yanetani	Japan	11	41.57	13	44.82	1:26.39	
22	29	Zuzana Doležalová	Czech Republic	15	43.33	2	43.22	1:26.55	
23	27	Ilona Ruotsalainen	Finland	14	43.29	4	43.37	1:26.66	
24	13	Svetlana Boldykova	Russia	7	43.30	3	43.36	1:26.66	
25	24	Carmen Ranigler	Italy	12	43.01	6	43.92	1:26.93	
26	30	Corinna Boccacini	Italy	15	44.49	4	44.39	1:28.88	
27	26	Glorija Kotnik	Slovenia	13	46.44	3	45.67	1:32.11	
28	16	Fraenzi Maegert-Kohli	Switzerland	8	1:09.11	2	41.65	1:50.76	
29	5	Kimiko Zakreski	Canada	3	41.36	10	DNF		
	28	Aleksandra Zhekova	Bulgaria	14	DNS				

=== Elimination round ===
Round of 16
1	Kreiner (AUT)
16	Chundak (UKR)	+2.29
9	Loo (CAN)	+0.01
8	Karstens (GER)
5	Tudegesheva (RUS)	DSQ
12	Kober (GER)
13	Gorgone (USA)	+0.21
4	Ilyukhina (RUS)
14	Jörg (GER)
3	Guenther (AUT)	+0.41
6	De Faucompret (FRA)	+4.88
11	Meschik (AUT)
7	Riegler (AUT)
10	Takeuchi (JPN)	+12.68
15	Laboeck (GER)	+17.98
2	Sauerbreij (NED)

Quarterfinals
1	Kreiner (AUT)
8	Karstens (GER)	+8.34
12	Kober (GER)	DSQ
4	Ilyukhina (RUS)
14	Jörg (GER)
11	Meschik (AUT)	+0.08
7	Riegler (AUT)	+0.30
2	Sauerbreij (NED)

Semifinals
1	Kreiner (AUT)	+0.14
4	Ilyukhina (RUS)
14	Jörg (GER)	DNF
2	Sauerbreij (NED)

Finals
4	Ilyukhina (RUS)	+0.23
2	Sauerbreij (NED)
Third place
1	Kreiner (AUT)
14	Jörg (GER)	+2.29

==== Classification 5-8 ====
The four quarterfinal losers entered the consolation bracket, where they raced for positions five through eight.

Placement 5-8
8	Karstens (GER)
12	Kober (GER)	DNS
11	Meschik (AUT)
7	Riegler (AUT)	DNF

Placement 5-6
8	Karstens (GER)
11	Meschik (AUT)	+0.64
Placement 7-8
7	Riegler (AUT)
12	Kober (GER)	DNS
