= Figure skating at the 2010 Winter Olympics – Men's singles =

Men's singles at the XXI Olympic Winter Games
- Venue: Pacific Coliseum; Vancouver, Canada
- Dates: 16 and 18 February 2010
- Competitors: 30 skaters from 20 nations
- Winning score: 257.67 points

Medalists
1st place, gold medalist(s)		Evan Lysacek	United States
2nd place, silver medalist(s)		Evgeni Plushenko	Russia
3rd place, bronze medalist(s)		Daisuke Takahashi	Japan

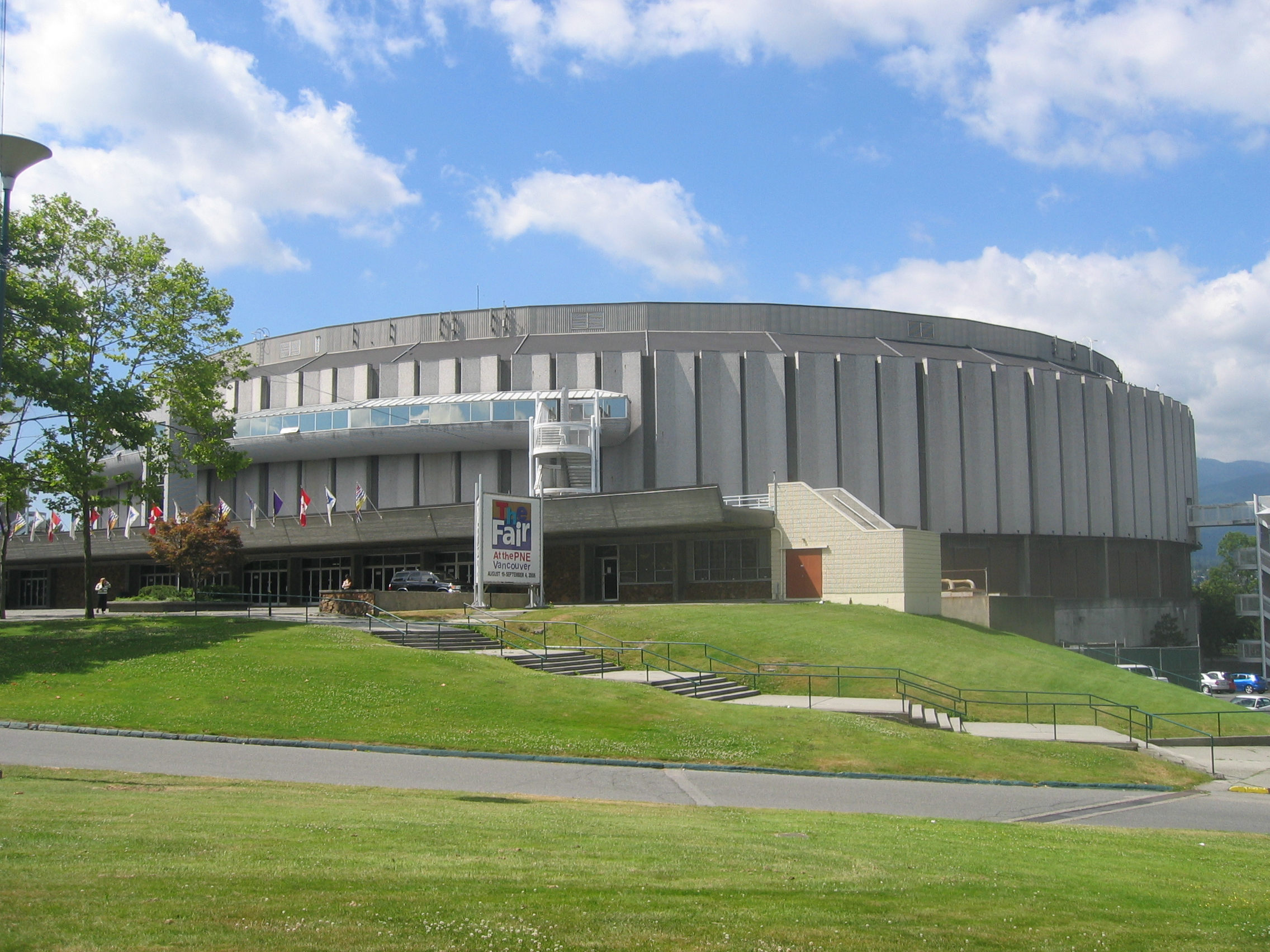
The figure skating events at the 2010 Winter Olympics were held at the Pacific Coliseum in Vancouver, Canada.

The men's singles figure skating competition at the 2010 Winter Olympics was held on 16 and 18 February 2010 at the Pacific Coliseum in Vancouver, Canada, and featured 30 skaters from 20 nations. While Evgeni Plushenko of Russia had been in the lead following the short program, Evan Lysacek of the United States pulled ahead in the free skate to win the gold medal. Plushenko won the silver medal and Daisuke Takahashi of Japan won the bronze. Lysacek's gold medal was the first for an American skater in the men's event in over twenty years, while Takahashi's bronze medal was the first Olympic medal in figure skating for a Japanese man. The results of the competition generated controversy when Lysacek won without performing a quadruple jump, which some felt was a necessary component of men's figure skating.

== Background ==
The men's single skating event was one of four figure skating competitions contested at the 2010 Winter Olympics in Vancouver, British Columbia, in Canada. It was held at the Pacific Coliseum over two nights: the short program took place on 16 February 2010 and the free skating on 18 February. The competition featured 30 skaters representing 20 nations. Evgeni Plushenko of Russia, who had won the gold medal at the 2006 Winter Olympics and retired shortly thereafter due to knee problems, came out of retirement with the goal of winning back-to-back Olympic gold medals. No man had won back-to-back Olympic gold medals in figure skating since Dick Button in 1952. Plushenko had just won the 2010 European Figure Skating Championships, finishing more than sixteen points ahead of Stéphane Lambiel of Switzerland. Plushenko credited his wife with encouraging him to return to competitive skating. "I wasn't certain, but it's such a great feeling," Plushenko explained. "I think that maybe I was missing that and didn't really know it." In addition to his gold medal from the 2006 Winter Olympics, Plushenko won the silver medal at the 2002 Winter Olympics, and was a three-time world champion, six-time European champion, four-time Grand Prix of Figure Skating Final champion, and eight-time Russian national champion.

Unlike the 2006 Winter Olympics, where Plushenko had been favored to win, he faced stiff competition in 2010. Stéphane Lambiel had finished second at the 2010 European Championships, and was a two-time world champion, two-time Grand Prix Final champion, and nine-time Swiss national champion. Brian Joubert of France, who finished in third place at the 2010 European Championships, was the 2007 world champion, a three-time European champion, the 2006 Grand Prix Final champion, and six-time French national champion. Other skaters seen as potential medalists included Patrick Chan of Canada, the 2009 Four Continents champion and three-time Canadian national champion; Evan Lysacek of the United States, the reigning world champion, two-time Four Continents champion, and two-time U.S. national champion; Daisuke Takahashi of Japan, the 2008 Four Continents champion and four-time Japanese national champion; and Jeremy Abbott of the United States, the 2008 Grand Prix Final champion and two-time U.S. national champion.

== Qualification ==
There is no individual athlete qualification to the Olympics; the choice of whom to send is at the discretion of each country's National Olympic Committee (NOC). Twenty-four quota spots in the men's event were awarded based on the results at the 2009 World Figure Skating Championships. Six additional quota spots were made available at the 2009 Nebelhorn Trophy.

Qualifying nations in men's singles
Event	Skaters per NOC	Qualifying NOCs	Total skaters
2009 World Championships	3	Japan; United States	24
2009 World Championships	2	Canada; Czech Republic; France; Italy; Kazakhstan; Russia	24
2009 World Championships	1	Belgium; Poland; Slovenia; Spain; Sweden; Ukraine	24
2009 Nebelhorn Trophy	1	Austria; Finland; Germany; North Korea; Romania; Switzerland	6
Total			30

== Required performance elements ==
Men performed their short programs on 16 February. Lasting no more than 2 minutes 50 seconds, the short program had to include the following elements: one double or triple Axel; one triple or quadruple jump immediately preceded by connecting steps; one jump combination consisting of a double jump and a triple jump, or two triple jumps, or a quadruple jump and a double or triple jump; one flying spin; one camel spin or sit spin with a change of foot; one spin combination consisting of sit, upright, and camel positions and a change of foot; and two different step sequences.

The twenty-four highest-scoring skaters after the short program advanced to the free skating, which they performed on 18 February. Lasting 4 minutes 30 seconds (+/− 10 seconds), the free skate had to include the following elements: eight jump elements, of which one had to be an Axel-type jump; three spins, of which one had to be a spin combination, one a flying spin, and one a spin with only one position; and two different step sequences.

== Judging ==
Skaters were judged according to the required technical elements of their program (such as jumps and spins), as well as the overall presentation of their program, based on five program components (skating skills, transitions/linking footwork and movement, performance/execution, choreography/composition, and musical interpretation). Each technical element in a figure skating performance was assigned a predetermined base point value and scored by a panel of nine judges on a scale from −3 to +3 based on the quality of its execution. Each Grade of Execution (GOE) from –3 to +3 was assigned a value as indicated on the Scale of Values. For example, a triple Axel was worth a base value of 8.20 points, and a GOE of +3 was worth 3.00 points, so a triple Axel with a GOE of +3 earned 11.20 points. The judging panel's GOE for each element was determined by calculating the trimmed mean (the average after discarding the highest and lowest scores). The panel's scores for all elements were added together to generate a Total Elements Score. At the same time, the judges evaluated each performance based on the five aforementioned program components and assigned each a score from 0.25 to 10 in 0.25-point increments. The judging panel's final score for each program component was also determined by calculating the trimmed mean. Those scores were then multiplied by the factor shown on the chart below; the results were added together to generate a total Program Component Score.

Program component factoring
Discipline	Short program	Free skate
Men	1.00	2.00

Deductions were applied for certain violations, such as time infractions or falls. The Total Elements Score and Program Component Score were then added together, minus any deductions, to generate a final performance score for each skater.

== Results ==
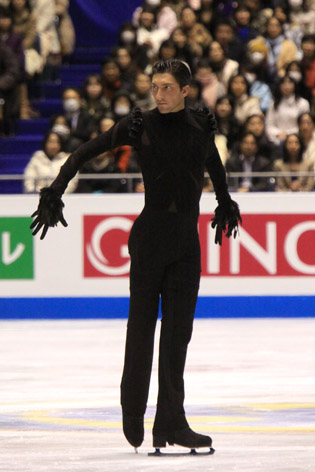
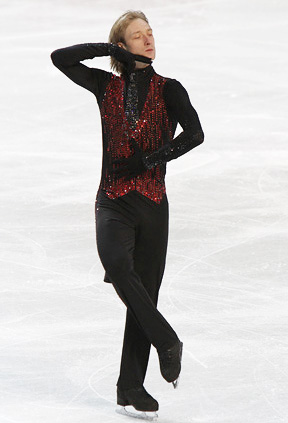
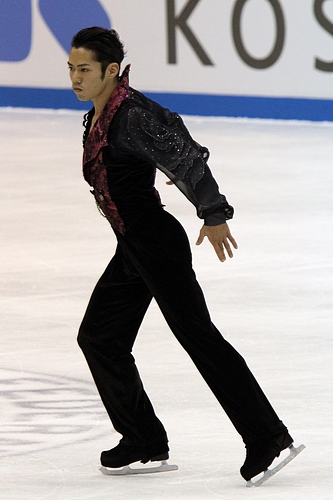
The medalists from the men's event at the 2010 Winter Olympics (from left to right):
Evan Lysacek of the United States (gold), Evgeni Plushenko of Russia (silver), and Daisuke Takahashi of Japan (bronze)

Code key

- TSS – Total Segment Score
- TES – Total Elements Score
- PCS – Program Component Score
- SS – Skating skills
- TR – Transitions
- PE – Performance
- CH – Choreography
- IN – Musical interpretation
- DED – Deductions

=== Short program ===
The men's short program was held on 16 February. Evgeni Plushenko of Russia finished in first place with what Dan Barnes of the Vancouver Sun described as an "awe-inspiring" performance that included a quadruple toe loop-triple toe loop jump combination and a "perfect" triple Axel. Evan Lysacek of the United States and Daisuke Takahashi of Japan were the only other skaters to approach Plushenko's score of 90.85, placing second and third, respectively. Lysacek scored 90.30 and Takahashi scored 90.25. More than five points separated Takahashi from the fourth-place finisher. Although neither included a quadruple jump in their routines, their performance scores for choreography, skating skills, and musical interpretation were enough to place them close to Plushenko. Stéphane Lambiel of Switzerland stumbled on an attempted quadruple toe loop, performing only a double toe loop in combination and leaving him in fifth place. Brian Joubert of France fell on his triple Lutz and stumbled on his attempted quadruple toe loop, leaving him in eighteenth place.

Evan Lysacek began celebrating before he even performed his final spin, pumping his fists, and when the music ended, he dropped to his knees, dazed at his performance. His performance was described by Philip Hersh of the Los Angeles Times as commanding, his jumps solid, and his spins dynamic. Lysacek had had a bad short program at the 2006 Winter Olympics, which he described as a "little monkey on [his] back from Torino four years ago". Making up for that by delivering what he felt was one of his best short program performances led to his emotional release on the ice. While he did not perform any quadruple jumps, Lysacek explained that performing an intricate routine was as difficult as performing a quadruple jump. Lysacek's jumps – all triples – received strong scores. Evgeni Plushenko responded to criticism of his choreography and skating skills: "I don't care today about the transitions or the scoring system. I care [that] I did a clean program." Plushenko's coach, Alexei Mishin, stated that "to do a good quad, you have to lose transitions," and that anyone dismissing quadruple jumps as unnecessary were just making "fake explanations" because they could not perform them. Plushenko added that "without quadruples... it's not men's figure skating".

Men's short program results
Pl.	Skater	Nation	TSS	TES	PCS	SS	TR	PE	CH	IN	DED
1	Evgeni Plushenko	Russia	90.85	51.10	39.75	8.20	6.80	8.65	7.85	8.25	0.00
2	Evan Lysacek	United States	90.30	48.30	42.00	8.20	7.95	8.60	8.50	8.75	0.00
3	Daisuke Takahashi	Japan	90.25	48.90	41.35	8.30	7.50	8.55	8.30	8.70	0.00
4	Nobunari Oda	Japan	84.85	46.00	38.85	8.00	7.15	8.00	7.80	7.90	0.00
5	Stéphane Lambiel	Switzerland	84.63	41.48	43.15	8.50	8.20	8.65	8.65	9.15	0.00
6	Johnny Weir	United States	82.10	42.90	39.20	7.90	7.45	7.90	7.80	8.15	0.00
7	Patrick Chan	Canada	81.12	41.42	40.70	8.30	7.85	8.00	8.25	8.30	1.00
8	Takahiko Kozuka	Japan	79.59	42.14	37.45	7.60	7.25	7.55	7.60	7.45	0.00
9	Michal Březina	Czech Republic	78.80	42.50	36.30	7.35	7.00	7.35	7.30	7.30	0.00
10	Denis Ten	Kazakhstan	76.24	41.24	35.00	7.20	6.55	7.10	6.90	7.25	0.00
11	Florent Amodio	France	75.35	41.90	33.45	6.65	6.40	6.80	6.65	6.95	0.00
12	Kevin van der Perren	Belgium	72.90	39.20	33.70	6.95	6.35	6.95	6.60	6.85	0.00
13	Artem Borodulin	Russia	72.24	39.94	32.30	6.50	5.95	6.70	6.55	6.60	0.00
14	Samuel Contesti	Italy	70.60	36.60	35.00	7.15	6.60	7.10	7.00	7.15	1.00
15	Jeremy Abbott	United States	69.40	30.70	38.70	7.90	7.75	7.30	7.85	7.90	0.00
16	Javier Fernández	Spain	68.69	37.64	31.05	6.25	5.85	6.30	6.15	6.50	0.00
17	Stefan Lindemann	Germany	68.50	37.70	30.80	6.40	5.85	6.30	6.05	6.20	0.00
18	Brian Joubert	France	68.00	31.90	37.10	7.90	6.80	7.45	7.35	7.60	1.00
19	Tomáš Verner	Czech Republic	65.32	30.02	36.30	7.50	7.05	7.20	7.30	7.25	1.00
20	Paolo Bacchini	Italy	64.42	34.82	29.60	5.90	5.55	6.00	6.00	6.15	0.00
21	Anton Kovalevski	Ukraine	63.81	36.66	27.15	5.60	4.90	5.60	5.40	5.65	0.00
22	Adrian Schultheiss	Sweden	63.13	32.78	30.35	6.25	5.85	6.25	6.00	6.00	0.00
23	Viktor Pfeifer	Austria	60.88	34.08	26.80	5.45	5.05	5.50	5.25	5.55	0.00
24	Vaughn Chipeur	Canada	57.22	30.22	27.00	5.80	5.05	5.35	5.40	5.40	0.00
25	Ri Song-chol	North Korea	56.60	33.40	23.20	5.15	4.15	4.80	4.60	4.50	0.00
26	Abzal Rakimgaliev	Kazakhstan	55.88	32.48	23.40	5.05	4.45	4.80	4.50	4.60	0.00
27	Gregor Urbas	Slovenia	53.02	28.92	24.10	5.10	4.45	4.85	4.90	4.80	0.00
28	Przemysław Domański	Poland	52.14	28.44	23.70	4.80	4.60	4.80	4.80	4.70	0.00
29	Zoltán Kelemen	Romania	51.95	27.40	25.55	5.25	4.75	5.25	5.10	5.20	1.00
30	Ari-Pekka Nurmenkari	Finland	44.62	22.72	22.90	5.00	4.30	4.50	4.70	4.40	1.00

=== Free skating ===
The men's free skate was held on 18 February. Evan Lysacek edged out Evgeni Plushenko to win the gold medal, setting a personal-best score of 257.67. Lysacek outscored Plushenko in his performed elements (jumps and spins), but their Program Component Scores – the measure of skating skills, transitions, choreography, and musical interpretation – were tied. Lysacek's performance, set to Scheherazade by Nikolai Rimsky-Korsakov, featured eight triple jumps, including a triple Axel, and complex step sequences. Lysacek's gold medal was the first to be won in the men's event without performing a quadruple jump since 1994, and the first in over twenty years for an American skater in the men's event.

Plushenko's performance, set to "Tango Amore", featured only one quadruple jump: a quadruple toe loop-triple toe loop jump combination that was meant to have a double loop added as a third element, but was omitted. Additionally, Plushenko had difficulty holding the landing of a triple Axel. Plushenko and his coach, Alexei Mishin, both disparaged Lysacek afterward for winning the gold medal without performing a quadruple jump. "If [an] Olympic champion doesn't know how to jump quad, I don't know," Plushenko stated, "now it's not men's skating; now it's dancing." Lysacek responded to Plushenko's criticism graciously. "Plushenko is... a great skater. I've admired him for years. For him to discredit the field is not right. It's probably the strongest men's field there's ever been." Lysacek later added: "All I know is that he's been a positive role model for me... I was a little disappointed that someone who was my role model would take a hit at me at one of the most special moments of my life, but it's tough to lose."

Lysacek's victory over Plushenko generated much press. Reuters reported that Russian president Vladimir Putin sent Plushenko a telegram telling him that his "silver is worth gold". However, a technical analysis demonstrated how Lysacek was able to outscore Plushenko after they both received identical artistic scores:

- Lysacek performed five jump elements in the second half of his program, where skaters received a ten percent bonus, while Plushenko only performed three.
- Plushenko landed his quadruple toe loop heavily and was able to follow it up with a triple toe loop, but not with the double loop that had been planned.
- Lysacek only received a judges' warning for an improper takeoff on his triple flip and not a point deduction.
- Lysacek's spins were faster and more centered than Plushenko's.
- Plushenko landed two of his jumps in a tilted position, nearly stepping out of his triple Axel.
- Plushenko only performed one quadruple jump, not two as he had done in previous performances.

Daisuke Takahashi, who had finished in eighth place at the 2006 Winter Olympics, won the bronze medal, becoming only the third Japanese athlete to win an Olympic medal in figure skating, but the first Japanese man to do so. He attempted a quadruple toe loop in his free skate, but fell hard on the ice; he followed that with two successful triple Axels. Takahashi's free skate, set to music from La Strada, received the highest Program Component Score of all the men in competition (84.50). He ultimately finished only 0.51 points ahead of Stéphane Lambiel. Takahashi stated afterward that he had intended to retire after the 2010 Winter Olympics, but his bronze medal win inspired him to continue competing.

Men's free skate results
Pl.	Skater	Nation	TSS	TES	PCS	SS	TR	PE	CH	IN	DED
1	Evan Lysacek	United States	167.37	84.57	82.80	8.20	7.95	8.50	8.35	8.40	0.00
2	Evgeni Plushenko	Russia	165.51	82.71	82.80	8.40	7.25	8.80	8.20	8.75	0.00
3	Stéphane Lambiel	Switzerland	162.09	78.49	83.60	8.30	8.05	8.30	8.45	8.70	0.00
4	Patrick Chan	Canada	160.30	79.30	82.00	8.35	7.95	8.20	8.25	8.25	1.00
5	Daisuke Takahashi	Japan	156.98	73.48	84.50	8.55	8.15	8.50	8.40	8.65	1.00
6	Johnny Weir	United States	156.77	79.67	77.10	7.70	7.45	7.80	7.75	7.85	0.00
7	Nobunari Oda	Japan	153.69	79.69	77.00	8.00	7.25	7.80	7.70	7.75	3.00
8	Takahiko Kozuka	Japan	151.60	78.40	74.20	7.60	7.05	7.55	7.50	7.40	1.00
9	Jeremy Abbott	United States	149.56	71.56	79.00	7.90	7.80	7.80	7.95	8.05	1.00
10	Javier Fernández	Spain	137.99	68.19	70.80	6.90	6.45	7.30	7.15	7.60	1.00
11	Michal Březina	Czech Republic	137.93	67.43	71.50	7.30	6.80	7.20	7.30	7.15	1.00
12	Artem Borodulin	Russia	137.92	72.62	65.30	6.60	5.95	6.95	6.50	6.65	0.00
13	Adrian Schultheiss	Sweden	137.31	74.01	63.30	6.25	5.95	6.45	6.40	6.60	0.00
14	Denis Ten	Kazakhstan	135.01	67.61	67.40	6.85	6.30	6.85	6.80	6.90	0.00
15	Florent Amodio	France	134.95	63.25	71.70	7.30	6.85	7.15	7.20	7.35	0.00
16	Brian Joubert	France	132.22	59.12	74.10	7.80	6.75	7.40	7.55	7.55	1.00
17	Tomáš Verner	Czech Republic	119.42	52.62	67.80	7.05	6.50	6.45	7.20	6.70	1.00
18	Kevin van der Perren	Belgium	116.94	54.04	62.90	6.55	5.90	6.20	6.35	6.45	0.00
19	Samuel Contesti	Italy	116.90	50.20	66.70	6.70	6.20	6.70	6.75	7.00	0.00
20	Viktor Pfeifer	Austria	115.05	61.25	54.80	5.60	5.00	5.50	5.55	5.75	1.00
21	Vaughn Chipeur	Canada	113.70	55.10	58.60	6.00	5.40	5.90	5.95	6.05	0.00
22	Paolo Bacchini	Italy	112.79	55.19	57.60	5.95	5.20	5.95	5.75	5.95	0.00
23	Stefan Lindemann	Germany	103.48	46.68	56.80	6.15	5.35	5.70	5.75	5.45	0.00
24	Anton Kovalevski	Ukraine	102.09	49.99	55.10	5.70	5.30	5.45	5.60	5.50	3.00

=== Overall ===
Men's results
Rank	Skater	Nation	Total	SP		FS	
1st place, gold medalist(s)	Evan Lysacek	United States	257.67	2	90.30	1	167.37
2nd place, silver medalist(s)	Evgeni Plushenko	Russia	256.36	1	90.85	2	165.51
3rd place, bronze medalist(s)	Daisuke Takahashi	Japan	247.23	3	90.25	5	156.98
4	Stéphane Lambiel	Switzerland	246.72	5	84.63	3	162.09
5	Patrick Chan	Canada	241.42	7	81.12	4	160.30
6	Johnny Weir	United States	238.87	6	82.10	6	156.77
7	Nobunari Oda	Japan	238.54	4	84.85	7	153.69
8	Takahiko Kozuka	Japan	231.19	8	79.59	8	151.60
9	Jeremy Abbott	United States	218.96	15	69.40	9	149.56
10	Michal Březina	Czech Republic	216.73	9	78.80	11	137.93
11	Denis Ten	Kazakhstan	211.25	10	76.24	14	135.01
12	Florent Amodio	France	210.30	11	75.35	15	134.95
13	Artem Borodulin	Russia	210.16	13	72.24	12	137.92
14	Javier Fernández	Spain	206.68	16	68.69	10	137.99
15	Adrian Schultheiss	Sweden	200.44	22	63.13	13	137.31
16	Brian Joubert	France	200.22	18	68.00	16	132.22
17	Kevin van der Perren	Belgium	189.84	12	72.90	18	116.94
18	Samuel Contesti	Italy	187.50	14	70.60	19	116.90
19	Tomáš Verner	Czech Republic	184.74	19	65.32	17	119.42
20	Paolo Bacchini	Italy	177.21	20	64.42	22	112.79
21	Viktor Pfeifer	Austria	175.93	23	60.88	20	115.05
22	Stefan Lindemann	Germany	171.98	17	68.50	23	103.48
23	Vaughn Chipeur	Canada	170.92	24	57.22	21	113.70
24	Anton Kovalevski	Ukraine	165.90	21	63.81	24	102.09
25	Ri Song-chol	North Korea	56.60	25	56.60	Did not advance to free skate	
26	Abzal Rakimgaliev	Kazakhstan	55.88	26	55.88	Did not advance to free skate	
27	Gregor Urbas	Slovenia	53.02	27	53.02	Did not advance to free skate	
28	Przemysław Domański	Poland	52.14	28	52.14	Did not advance to free skate	
29	Zoltán Kelemen	Romania	51.95	29	51.95	Did not advance to free skate	
30	Ari-Pekka Nurmenkari	Finland	44.62	30	44.62	Did not advance to free skate	

== Aftermath ==
Evgeni Plushenko of Russia received a fair amount of criticism after the men's event ended for what many perceived as poor sportsmanship. During the medal ceremony, Plushenko stepped onto the gold-medal podium. He later explained to reporters that he had forgotten that he had finished second. Later, Plushenko's website showed his three Olympic medals labeled as Silver of Salt Lake, Gold of Torino, Platinum of Vancouver. The Florida Times-Union likened Plushenko to Ivan Drago, the antagonist from Rocky IV, while Barbara Bradley of The Commercial Appeal called Plushenko a "sore loser".

Plushenko and his supporters were not the only people to have a problem with a skater winning the gold medal in the men's event without performing a quadruple jump. Brian Boitano of the United States, who won the gold medal at the 1988 Winter Olympics, and Philippe Candeloro of France, who twice won the Olympic bronze medal (in 1994 and 1998), both expressed the opinion that the gold medal should go to someone able to perform the most challenging technical elements. Candeloro explained: "Evan did a very good job; all the jumps were clean. But my problem is, I didn’t see any quad." In a column for Yahoo! Sports, Elvis Stojko of Canada, two-time Olympic silver medalist (in 1994 and 1998), decried the state of men's figure skating, calling Evan Lysacek's win "outrageous". "How can you be Olympic champion when you don't even try the quad?" Stojko asked. He wrote that Lysacek's performance "wasn't Olympic champion material", and then added, "There are junior skaters who can skate that same program."

== Works cited ==
- "Special Regulations & Technical Rules – Single & Pair Skating and Ice Dance 2008" (PDF). International Skating Union. Archived from the original (PDF) on 16 October 2021.
