= 2009 ISU World Team Trophy in Figure Skating =

2009 World Team Trophy
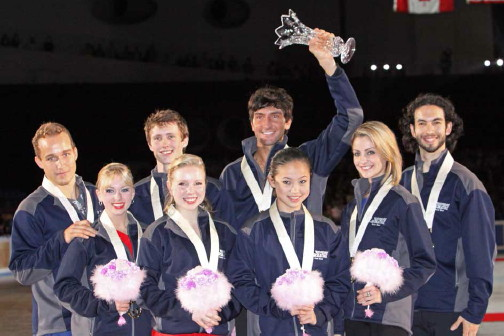
- Team USA at the medal ceremony
- Type: ISU Event
- Date: April 15 – 19
- Season: 2008–09
- Location: Tokyo, Japan
- Host: Japan Skating Federation
- Next: 2012 ISU World Team Trophy

The 2009 ISU World Team Trophy was an international figure skating competition in the 2008–09 season. The six countries with the best results during the season – in descending order of finish: the United States, Canada, Japan, France, Russia and China – selected two men's single skaters, two ladies' single skaters, one pair, and one ice dancing entry to compete in a team format. The planned Olympic team event will have one entry per discipline.

The country with the most points after all disciplines was awarded the trophy. The Japan Skating Federation (JSF) paid the prize money for the ISU World Team Trophy in 2009. Total prize money in 2009 was US$1,000,000, the highest ever at an ISU event.

== Results ==
=== Team standing ===
Rank	Nation	Total team points
1	United States	60
2	Canada	54
3	Japan	50
4	France	37
5	Russia	35
6	China	34

=== Men ===
Rank	Nation	Name	Total points	SP		FS		Team points
1	United States	Evan Lysacek	238.56	2	83.70	1	154.86	12
2	France	Brian Joubert	237.09	1	85.39	3	151.70	11
3	Japan	Nobunari Oda	229.25	3	79.35	4	149.90	10
4	Canada	Patrick Chan	217.98	9	66.03	2	151.95	9
5	United States	Jeremy Abbott	205.05	5	71.27	5	133.78	8
6	Canada	Vaughn Chipeur	198.91	6	71.05	6	127.86	7
7	Russia	Sergei Voronov	196.70	4	71.42	8	125.28	6
8	Japan	Takahiko Kozuka	190.93	10	65.25	7	125.68	5
9	China	Jialiang Wu	183.86	8	66.90	10	116.96	4
10	France	Florent Amodio	182.32	7	69.85	11	112.47	3
11	China	Chao Yang	177.94	11	55.73	9	122.21	2
12	Russia	Konstantin Menshov	165.21	12	54.99	12	110.22	1

=== Ladies ===
Rank	Nation	Name	Total points	SP		FS		Team points
1	Japan	Mao Asada	201.87	1	75.84	1	126.03	12
2	Canada	Joannie Rochette	182.16	2	62.08	2	120.08	11
3	United States	Caroline Zhang	175.68	4	58.88	3	116.80	10
4	United States	Rachael Flatt	171.81	5	58.40	4	113.41	9
5	Japan	Miki Ando	167.52	3	62.08	6	105.44	8
6	Russia	Alena Leonova	161.40	6	54.72	5	106.68	7
7	Canada	Cynthia Phaneuf	135.65	7	54.30	9	81.35	6
8	China	Yan Liu	135.41	10	44.36	7	91.05	5
9	China	Binshu Xu	133.26	8	50.30	8	82.96	4
10	France	Candice Didier	126.46	9	48.38	10	78.08	3
11	France	Gwendoline Didier	113.87	12	38.10	11	75.77	2
12	Russia	Katarina Gerboldt	112.03	11	42.42	12	69.61	1

=== Pairs ===
Rank	Nation	Name	Total points	SP		FS		Team points
1	China	Zhang Dan / Zhang Hao	193.82	1	70.42	1	123.40	12
2	Russia	Yuko Kavaguti / Alexander Smirnov	185.15	2	65.08	2	120.07	11
3	Canada	Jessica Dubé / Bryce Davison	164.12	4	55.44	3	108.68	10
4	United States	Caydee Denney / Jeremy Barrett	158.24	3	56.58	4	101.66	9
5	France	Vanessa James / Yannick Bonheur	128.79	5	46.20	6	82.91	8
6	Japan	Narumi Takahashi / Mervin Tran	125.91	6	43.00	5	82.59	7

=== Ice dancing ===
There was no compulsory dance.

Rank	Nation	Name	Total points	OD		FD		Team points
1	United States	Tanith Belbin / Benjamin Agosto	162.98	1	64.27	1	98.71	12
2	Canada	Tessa Virtue / Scott Moir	156.71	2	60.98	2	95.73	11
3	France	Nathalie Péchalat / Fabian Bourzat	150.63	4	57.36	3	93.27	10
4	Russia	Jana Khokhlova / Sergei Novitski	149.45	3	58.58	4	90.87	9
5	Japan	Cathy Reed / Chris Reed	120.23	5	44.80	5	75.43	8
6	China	Xintong Huang / Xun Zheng	110.40	6	44.26	6	66.14	7
