= Nina Micić =

Serbian snowboarder (born 1991)

Personal information
- Nationality: Serbian
- Born: 30 January 1991 (age 35) Kraljevo, FR Yugoslavia
- Home town: Belgrade, Serbia
- Height: 5 ft 7 in (170 cm)
- Weight: 119 lb (54 kg)

Sport
- Country: Serbia
- Sport: Snowboarding
- Events: Parallel slalom, parallel GS
- Team: Serbia (2014)
Medal record
Snowboarding
Representing Serbia
European Youth Olympic Festival
Silver medal – second place	2007 Jaca	Parallel GS

Nina Micić (Serbian Cyrillic: Нина Мицић, born 30 January 1991 in Kraljevo) is a Serbian snowboarder. She won a silver medal at the 2007 European Youth Winter Olympic Festival in the parallel giant slalom event. She is the first Serbian athlete who won a medal at the Winter EYOF. Nina qualified for 2014 Winter Olympics and became first Serbian Olympic snowboarder in history.

== Career highlights ==
Nina represents Serbia in the World Championships, World Cup and Winter Universiade.

YEAR	EVENT	DISCIPLINE	PLACE
2007	World Snowboard Championships	Snowboardcross	39th
2007	World Snowboard Championships	Parallel GS	45th
2007	World Snowboard Championships	Parallel Slalom	45th
2007	European Youth Olympic Festival	Parallel GS	2nd
2007	European Youth Olympic Festival	Giant Slalom	34th
2007	Junior World Championships	Snowboardcross	48th
2007	Junior World Championships	Parallel GS	26th
2007	Junior World Championships	Parallel Slalom	27th
2008	Junior World Championships	Parallel GS	30th
2008	Junior World Championships	Parallel Slalom	18th
2009	World Snowboard Championships	Parallel GS	34th
2009	World Snowboard Championships	Parallel Slalom	38th
2011	World Snowboard Championships	Parallel GS	27th
2011	World Snowboard Championships	Parallel Slalom	34th
2011	Winter Universiade	Parallel GS	14h
2011	Junior World Championships	Parallel GS	16th
2011	Junior World Championships	Parallel Slalom	9th
2013	Winter Universiade	Parallel GS	9th
2014	Winter Olympic Games	Parallel GS	27th
2014	Winter Olympic Games	Parallel Slalom	31st

== Personal life ==
Nina's younger brother, Vasilije Micić, is a professional basketball player. He has been an NBA player and is an Israeli Basketball Premier League basketball player and 2021 Euroleague MVP.

She is dating professional basketball player Luka Mitrović. In February 2022, she gave birth to their first child.
