= Zuzana Doležalová =

Czech snowboarder (born 1980)

Personal information
- Nationality: Czech
- Born: Zuzana Vojtěchová; September 12, 1980 (age 45) Děčín, Czechoslovakia

Sport
- Sport: Snowboarding

Zuzana Doležalová (born 12 September 1980 in Děčín) is a Czech former snowboarder. She placed 22nd in the women's parallel giant slalom event at the 2010 Winter Olympics.
