= Evan Lysacek =

American figure skater and Olympic gold medalist (born 1985)

Evan Lysacek OLY
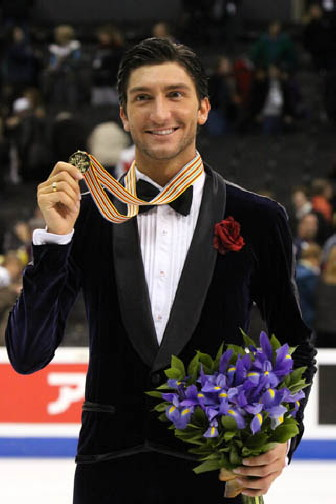
- Lysacek at the 2009 World Championships

Personal information
- Full name: Evan Frank Lysacek
- Born: June 4, 1985 (age 41) Chicago, Illinois, U.S.
- Home town: Los Angeles, California, U.S.
- Height: 6 ft 2 in (1.88 m)

Figure skating career
- Country: United States
- Discipline: Men's singles
- Began skating: 1994
Event	Gold medal – first place	Silver medal – second place	Bronze medal – third place
Olympic Games	1	0	0
World Championships	1	0	2
Four Continents Championships	2	1	2
Grand Prix Final	1	0	1
U.S. Championships	2	2	2
World Team Trophy	1	0	0
World Junior Championships	0	3	0
Junior Grand Prix Final	1	0	0
Medal list
Olympic Games
Gold medal – first place	2010 Vancouver	Singles
World Championships
Gold medal – first place	2009 Los Angeles	Singles
Bronze medal – third place	2005 Moscow	Singles
Bronze medal – third place	2006 Calgary	Singles
Four Continents Championships
Gold medal – first place	2005 Gangnueung	Singles
Gold medal – first place	2007 Colorado Springs	Singles
Silver medal – second place	2009 Vancouver	Singles
Bronze medal – third place	2004 Hamilton	Singles
Bronze medal – third place	2008 Goyang	Singles
Grand Prix Final
Gold medal – first place	2009–10 Tokyo	Singles
Bronze medal – third place	2007–08 Turin	Singles
U.S. Championships
Gold medal – first place	2007 Spokane	Singles
Gold medal – first place	2008 Saint Paul	Singles
Silver medal – second place	2006 St. Louis	Singles
Silver medal – second place	2010 Spokane	Singles
Bronze medal – third place	2005 Portland	Singles
Bronze medal – third place	2009 Cleveland	Singles
World Team Trophy
Gold medal – first place	2009 Tokyo	Team
World Junior Championships
Silver medal – second place	2001 Budapest	Singles
Silver medal – second place	2003 Ostrava	Singles
Silver medal – second place	2004 The Hague	Singles
Junior Grand Prix Final
Gold medal – first place	2003–04 Malmö	Singles

Evan Frank Lysacek (/ˈlaɪsətʃɛk/; born June 4, 1985) is an American retired figure skater. He is the 2010 Olympic champion, the 2009 World champion, a two-time (2005, 2007) Four Continents champion, the 2009 Grand Prix Final champion, and a two-time (2007, 2008) U.S. national champion. Lysacek was the 2010 United States Olympic Committee's SportsMan of the Year, and the winner of the James E. Sullivan Award as the top U.S. amateur athlete of 2010. On January 22, 2016, he was inducted into the U.S. Figure Skating Hall of Fame.

== Personal life ==
Lysacek was born in Chicago, Illinois, and raised in nearby Naperville. His mother, Tanya (née Santoro), is a substitute teacher in Naperville, and his father, Don, is a building contractor. He has an older sister, Laura, and a younger sister, Christina. Lysacek graduated from Neuqua Valley High School in 2003. During high school, Lysacek was a member of the honor roll, where he earned a number of academic achievement awards, including the Presidential Award for Academic Excellence in 1999. After graduation, he moved to Los Angeles, California to train at the Toyota Sports Performance Center in El Segundo, California. Lysacek studied acting at the Professional Arts School in Beverly Hills, and appeared in the independent short film Skate Great!, playing a Russian Olympic gold medalist.

Lysacek is of half-Czech descent; his paternal great-grandfather František Lysáček emigrated from Czechoslovakia's Moravia region to Chicago in 1925. On his maternal side, he is of one-quarter Italian descent. He is a Greek Orthodox Christian, having stated that one of his most prized possessions is his Orthodox cross.

He became engaged to real estate developer Duangpatra "Dang" Bodiratnangkura in April 2019. They married in December 2019 in Bangkok, Thailand.

== Career ==
Lysacek began skating at the age of eight. His grandmother had always wanted to be in the Ice Capades, so she bought him skates for Christmas. He originally wanted to play ice hockey, so his mother enrolled him and his sister Laura in figure skating lessons to learn how to skate.

=== Early career ===
In 1996, Lysacek won the U.S. national title at the juvenile level – the lowest qualifying level in the U.S. Figure Skating competition structure. In 1997, he moved up to intermediate and won the pewter medal (fourth place) at the Junior Olympics, after winning both his regional and his sectional qualifying competitions. After failing to qualify for Nationals at the novice level in 1998, Lysacek won the U.S. Novice title at the 1999 U.S. Championships at the age of thirteen.

=== Junior career ===
==== 1999–2000 season ====
In the 1999–2000 season, Lysacek made his international junior debut and competed on the 1999–2000 ISU Junior Grand Prix circuit. He placed seventh at his first event and then won his second event. He was the third alternate to the 1999–2000 ISU Junior Grand Prix Final.

At the 2000 U.S. Championships, Lysacek won the Junior title at the age of fourteen. He placed fifth in the short program and first in the free skate, placing first overall. He was the first male skater since Terry Kubicka to win back-to-back novice and junior men's titles in the United States. The win on the junior level was unusual in that Lysacek moved from third to first overall while sitting backstage, because he won through a tiebreak in the 6.0 ordinal system. Following the U.S. Championships, he was assigned to the 2000 Gardena Spring Trophy in Urtijëi, Italy, where he won the silver medal at the junior level.

==== 2000–2001 season ====
Lysacek had a strong showing in the 2000–2001 season. He competed in his second season on the Junior Grand Prix circuit and won two silver medals. He was the 7th qualifier for the 2000–2001 Junior Grand Prix Final and placed 8th at the Final.

He made his senior national debut at the 2001 U.S. Championships, placing 12th at the age of fifteen. Lysacek was named second alternate to the U.S. team to the 2001 World Junior Championships and was placed on the team after Ryan Bradley withdrew due to injury. Lysacek performed two clean programs and came in second behind fellow American Johnny Weir, giving the United States both a gold and a silver on the World Junior podium for the first time since 1987.

==== 2001–2002 season ====
Over the next season, Lysacek dealt with several injuries, including broken ribs, which resulted in lost training time. After the September 11, 2001 attacks, the United States Figure Skating Association cancelled the 2001–2002 ISU Junior Grand Prix event due to be held in Arizona and did not allow its junior skaters to compete on the Junior Grand Prix circuit for the rest of that season. At the 2002 U.S. Championships, Lysacek repeated his 12th-place finish from the previous year and was not selected for the team to the 2002 World Junior Championships. He was sent to the 2002 Triglav Trophy in April, where he won the gold medal on the junior level.

==== 2002–2003 season ====
In the 2002–2003 season, Lysacek competed on the 2002–2003 ISU Junior Grand Prix circuit and won two silver medals. He was the 4th qualifier for the 2002–2003 Junior Grand Prix Final, where he placed 5th. For the 2003 U.S. Championships, he finished in 7th place.

Lysacek was named third alternate for the 2003 Four Continents Championships and was placed on the team after other skaters withdrew. He placed 10th at this event in his senior international debut. He was also named to the 2003 Junior Worlds team. Following the withdrawal of Parker Pennington, Lysacek was the only United States men's skater at the competition. He landed the first clean triple Axel jump of his career in the qualifying round of this competition and his second clean one in the free skate.

==== 2003–2004 season ====
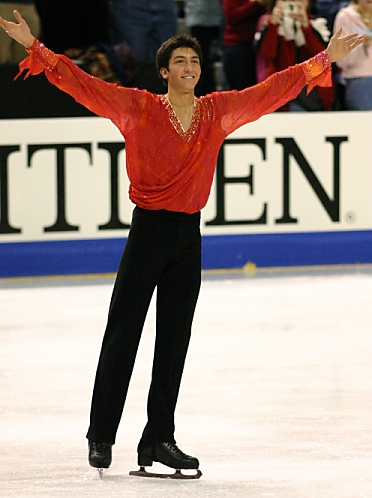
Lysacek at the 2004 Four Continents

After graduating from high school in 2003, Lysacek made a coaching change and began to work with Ken Congemi and Frank Carroll in El Segundo, California. With Congemi and Carroll, Lysacek won both of his Junior Grand Prix events. He was the second qualifier to the 2003–2004 Junior Grand Prix Final and won the event. He placed 5th at the 2004 U.S. Championships. At the 2004 Four Continents, he won the bronze medal, his first senior-level international medal. He then went on to compete at the 2004 World Junior Championships, where he won a third silver medal.

=== Senior career ===
==== 2004–2005 season ====
In the 2004–2005 season, having aged out of the junior level at age 19, Evan Lysacek made his senior international debut. Skating through a hip injury, Lysacek placed fifth at the 2004 Skate America, the first Grand Prix event of his career. He repeated that placement a few weeks later at the 2004 Cup of Russia. At the 2005 U.S. Championships, Lysacek won the bronze medal after receiving the only 6.0 of his career for his short program. He went on to win his first senior international title at the 2005 Four Continents. He competed next at the 2005 World Championships in Moscow. There, he won a bronze medal at his first senior World Championships, a competition for which his goal had been only to qualify for the free skate.

==== 2005–2006 season ====
In the 2005–2006 season, Lysacek again competed on the Grand Prix. He placed second at the 2005 Skate America, but he felt that his Grease free skate was not working. Lysacek and coach Frank Carroll made the decision to find a new long program. Lysacek's new Carmen program was a success at the 2005 NHK Trophy, where Lysacek finished second. Lysacek was the only American man to qualify for the 2005–2006 Grand Prix Final, but withdrew before the event because of bursitis and tendinitis in his right hip.

At the 2006 U.S. Championships, Lysacek was third after the short program, but won the free skate, finishing second overall. He was named to the 2006 Winter Olympic team alongside Johnny Weir and Matthew Savoie. At the Olympics, following a 10th place finish in the short program, Lysacek became sick with the stomach flu. Unable to practice, he stayed in bed at the Olympic village, receiving fluids from IVs. After considering withdrawing, he decided to skate the next day and went on to skate a career-best free skate. He finished his free skate with eight triple jumps and was ranked third of the night. He finished fourth overall. He commentated on his free-skating program on Olympic Ice the next day with Scott Hamilton and Mary Carillo.

Lysacek ended his season by winning the bronze medal at the 2006 World Championships in Calgary, Canada. He was once again troubled by illness, having been administered three different antibiotics to fight a bacterial infection. He rose from seventh place in the short program to finish third on the strength of his free skating program. After the World Championships, Lysacek toured with Champions on Ice as a full member of the cast.

==== 2006–2007 season ====
In the 2006–2007 season, Lysacek placed second at the 2006 Skate America. Two weeks later, Lysacek won the gold medal at the 2006 Cup of China by a 20-point margin. He was the fourth qualifier for the 2006–2007 Grand Prix Final in his second consecutive year in qualifying for the event. However, he withdrew from the competition before he was to skate his short program due to a hip injury.

Lysacek resumed training a few weeks later. At the 2007 U.S. Championships, he performed his first clean short program of the season, and then went on to land his first clean quadruple jump in competition (a quadruple toe loop-triple toe loop jump combination) to win his first national title. A week later, Lysacek competed at the 2007 Four Continents. He was fourth after the short program, but made yet another comeback in the free skate, landing a clean quadruple combination to earn a new personal best and to win his second Four Continents title.

At the 2007 World Championships, Lysacek placed fifth in the short program and earned himself his first new short program personal best in two years. In the long program, he completed a quadruple toe loop as the first part of a quad-triple combination, but lost control of the landing, adding a three-turn after it, and was unable to complete the following triple as intended. He performed a double loop instead of a planned triple loop and placed fifth once again in the long program, placing fifth over all.

Lysacek toured over the summer of 2007 with Champions on Ice for the second consecutive year.

==== 2007–2008 season ====
Lysacek began the 2007–2008 season at the 2007 Skate America. He fell on an attempted quadruple toe loop-triple toe loop in the short program, receiving only one point for that element. He was in second place going into the free skate, but won the free skate, landing a clean quadruple jump, although he was unable to finish in first overall. He went on to the 2007 Cup of China, where he won the short program with a score of 81.55, improving his personal best by almost thirteen points. He placed second in the free skate after falling on his quadruple jump, and finished second overall.

At the 2007–2008 Grand Prix Final, Lysacek was credited with a quadruple jump in both programs, and won the bronze medal overall, after placing third in both segments of the competition. He earned a new overall personal best of 229.78 points.

At the 2008 U.S. Championships, Lysacek was second after the short program and won the free skate. Although he tied with Johnny Weir on the overall score, Lysacek won the title on the tiebreaker, thereby earning his second national title.

His next event was the 2008 Four Continents, where he placed second in the short program and third in the free skate, and finished third overall. Lysacek was also named to the team for the 2008 World Championships. A week before the event, he was forced to withdraw due to an injury sustained while attempting a triple Axel; the blade broke off of his boot and he injured the left side of his body, from his forearm to his shoulder, and required a cast. Lysacek toured over the summer of 2008 with the Stars on Ice tour.

==== 2008–2009 season ====
Lysacek began the 2008–2009 season at the 2008 Skate America, where he won the bronze medal. The following week, he competed at the 2008 Skate Canada International, where he won a second bronze medal. Lysacek was the second alternate for the 2008–2009 Grand Prix Final.

At the 2009 U.S. Championships, Lysacek placed second in the short program. In the free skate, Lysacek fell on his quadruple combination attempt and placed fourth in that segment of the competition. He won the bronze medal overall. Due to his placement at the U.S. Championships, Lysacek was named to the teams to the 2009 Four Continents Championships and the 2009 World Championships.

At the 2009 Four Continents, Lysacek placed second in the short program. He placed second in the free skating segment as well, and then won the silver medal overall by a margin of 15.39 points.

At the 2009 World Championships, Lysacek placed second in the short program. He then won the free skating segment to win the competition overall, becoming the first American man since Todd Eldredge in 1996 to win the World title. At the World Championships, Lysacek competed with a stress fracture in his left foot, which prevented him from trying a quadruple jump at the competition. During the off-season, Lysacek took two months off from skating to give the injury time to heal. He was considered the front-runner for the 2010 Olympic gold by some journalists.

During the later part of the season and during the off-season, Lysacek toured with Stars on Ice.

==== 2009–2010 season ====
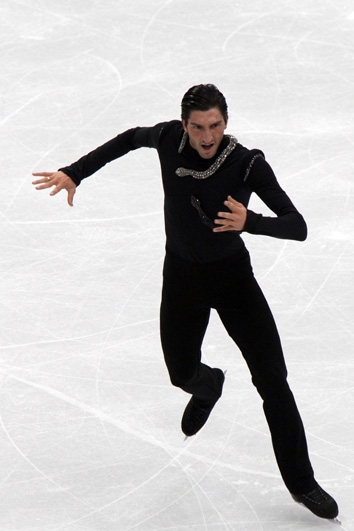
Lysacek at the 2010 Winter Olympics

Lysacek began the 2009–2010 season at the 2009 Cup of China, where he placed third in the short program and second in the free skating to win the silver medal overall. Afterwards he went on to the 2009 Skate America, where he won both segments of the competition and won the gold medal overall in his sixth time competing at Skate America. Lysacek was the second qualifier for the 2009–2010 Grand Prix Final.

At the Grand Prix Final, Lysacek placed second in the short program and won the free skating to win the title overall. He became the second consecutive American to win the title, following Jeremy Abbott the year before. At the 2010 U.S. Championships, he placed second in the short program and third in the free skating to win the silver medal overall. He was named to the Olympic team.

At the 2010 Winter Olympics, Lysacek placed second in the short program, with a score of 90.30 without any quadruple jumps. He won the free skate with a score of 167.37 and clinched the gold medal overall with a total score of 257.67, a margin of 1.31 over silver medalist and 2006 champion Evgeni Plushenko. He became the first American to win the Olympic title in men's singles since Brian Boitano in 1988, and the first reigning world champion to win since Scott Hamilton in 1984. Plushenko and the Russian figure skating federation, as well as the Russian public, criticized the result.

He had originally been named to the team for the 2010 World Championships, but withdrew from the World team following his win at the Olympics.

Lysacek was the recipient of the prestigious James E. Sullivan Award, which is given to America's best amateur athlete; he was the fourth figure skater to win the award after Dick Button in 1949, Michelle Kwan in 2001, and Sarah Hughes in 2002.

==== 2010–present ====
Lysacek did not skate competitively in 2010–2011, but did not announce a retirement.

In June 2011, he received two Grand Prix assignments for the 2011–2012 season: 2011 Skate America and 2011 Trophée Éric Bompard. He resumed training with Frank Carroll at Lake Arrowhead, California, and his publicist said he would make a decision whether to compete later in the summer. In September, he announced that his goal was to participate in the 2014 Winter Olympics. In October, U.S. Figure Skating announced that he would not compete at the 2011 Skate America due to a financial disagreement, and Lysacek confirmed that he would not take part in the Grand Prix series, explaining on his Twitter that "a suitable agreement could not be reached between U.S. Figure Skating and myself by the event entry deadline". In November, Lysacek confirmed he would not enter the 2012 U.S. Championships in January 2012 but negotiations with U.S. Figure Skating continued.

On August 10, 2012, U.S. Figure Skating announced that an agreement had been reached and Lysacek would return to competition at the 2012 Skate America. He withdrew after aggravating a groin injury. On November 20, 2012, Lysacek underwent surgery to repair a torn muscle in his lower abdomen, with an expected period of six weeks off the ice. In January 2013, he withdrew from the 2013 U.S. Championships, saying he was healthy but needed an additional three weeks to return to competition form.

On June 3, 2013, it was announced that Lysacek would compete at one ISU Grand Prix of Figure Skating event: the 2013 Skate America. However, on September 30, 2013, it was announced that he had withdrawn. On December 10, 2013, Lysacek announced on The Today Show that he would not attempt to qualify for the 2014 Winter Olympics due to the labrum injury that he sustained in September.

On August 30, 2014, during a TV interview, Lysacek mentioned his competitive skating career was coming to an end.

On December 15, 2015, U.S. Figure Skating announced Lysacek would be a member of the U.S. Figure Skating Hall of Fame Class of 2016. The induction ceremony was held on January 22, 2016, at the 2016 U.S. Figure Skating Championships.

=== After figure skating ===
In September 2014, Lysacek moved to New York City to pursue a career in commercial real estate. In 2015, he started working for Vera Wang, his former costume designer. He was hired by the Vera Wang Group to work as a strategic consultant in retail store development. In his 5 year tenure, Lysacek was promoted to a Vice-President of the company. In this role, Lysacek led marketing, advertising, and creative services efforts for Vera Wang Group, with emphasis on creating value for both internally operated product lines, as well as licensed partnerships. Lysacek’s role also included comprehensive account management for various licensed product partnerships. He also served on the Executive Leadership team, supporting in corporate strategy and business development. Lysacek resigned from his position in 2019, in order to join his wife, Duangpatra Bodiratnangkura in her residential real estate development company. In 2021, Lysacek and Bodiratnangkura founded Orum Capital, a venture capital investment company with a focus on their joint expertise; sports, technology, and real estate. The couple, who met in 2011, and were married on December 12, 2019 in Bangkok, Thailand.

== Coaches and choreographers ==
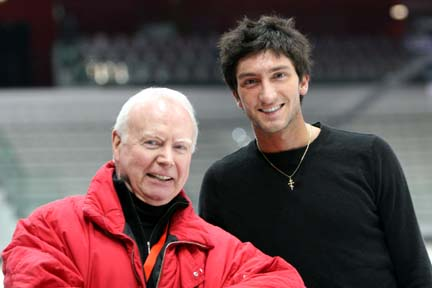
Lysacek with Frank Carroll, his coach since June 2003, at the 2007 Grand Prix Final where he won the bronze medal

Evan Lysacek was originally coached by Candice Brown in Naperville, Illinois. After that, he worked with Deborah Stoery in Naperville and Addison, Illinois, for three years. For the next two years, he had an arrangement where he would train under both Addison-based Maria Jeżak-Athey and Moscow-based Viktor Kudriavtsev. Kudriavtsev would come to Chicago for part of the year to coach, and Lysacek spent his summers at Kudriavtsev's summer training camps in Moscow, Russia and Flims, Switzerland. When that arrangement proved untenable, Kudriavtsev recommended Lysacek to Carroll, who agreed to coach Lysacek on the condition that Lysacek would work more with Congemi than with himself, due to Carroll's commitments to Timothy Goebel. Lysacek moved to El Segundo, California, to work with Frank Carroll and Ken Congemi in June 2003. Lysacek worked with both Congemi and Carroll through the 2006–2007 season, after which he began working solely with Carroll. He has also trained with ballerina Galina Barinova.

Lysacek trained with Carroll at the Toyota Sports Center in El Segundo. After Carroll moved to Palm Springs, they decided to meet midway at the Ice Castle International Training Center in Lake Arrowhead and Ontario, California, and Karen Kwan-Oppegard coached him at the East West Ice Palace in Artesia, California. In June 2013, Carroll moved back to the Toyota Sports Center.

Lysacek has worked with many choreographers over the years, including Oleg Epstein and Kurt Browning. Both of his programs for the 2007–2008 season were choreographed by Lori Nichol. He worked with Tatiana Tarasova on his programs for the 2008–2009 season. He returned to Nichol for the 2009–2010 season.

== Endorsements and public life ==
Lysacek supported a number of charities. He participated in Target – A Time for Heroes, a celebrity charity event benefiting the Elizabeth Glaser Pediatric AIDS Foundation. He also supported the Dana–Farber Cancer Institute (Jimmy Fund). He began supporting Figure Skating in Harlem in 2006 and is a board member of the charity. Lysacek has regularly attended their benefit gala in New York City.

Following his win at the 2009 World Figure Skating Championships, Lysacek acquired many sponsors, including Coca-Cola, AT&T, and Ralph Lauren. He also served as a spokesperson for Total Gym. In 2011, he switched agents from International Management Group to Creative Artists Agency. Lysacek left Creative Artists Agency in April 2012 and was represented by Shep Goldberg until his death in November 2014.

In April 2012, the U.S. Department of State's Bureau of Educational and Cultural Affairs named Lysacek a Sports Envoy.

=== Costumes ===
In the past, Lysacek has worn costumes designed by Christian Dior, Gianfranco Ferre, Alexander McQueen, and Vera Wang. Wang created the mock tuxedo Lysacek wore when he won the 2009 World Championships. Lysacek and Wang also collaborated to design his costumes for the 2010 Winter Olympics, as well as those worn for the rest of the 2009–2010 season.

=== Dancing with the Stars ===
Lysacek was a celebrity contestant on Dancing with the Stars for the tenth season, which premiered on Monday, March 22, 2010. He and his professional dance partner Anna Trebunskaya finished in second place.

Evan Lysacek - Dancing with the Stars (season 10)
Week	Dance	Music	Judges' scores (Note: Individual judges' scores are listed in the following order: Carrie Ann Inaba, Len Goodman, Bruno Tonioli.)			Total score	Result
1	Viennese waltz	"I'll Be" — Edwin McCain	8	7	8	23	Safe
2	Jive	"The Best Damn Thing" — Avril Lavigne	8	8	8	24	Safe
3	Quickstep	"Hot Honey Rag" — from Chicago	9	8	9	26	Safe
4	Tango	"Wait a Minute" — The Pussycat Dolls, feat. Timbaland	9	8	9	52 (Note: Contestants received two sets of scores from the judges during week 4: one for technical and one for performance. Evan's scores for both sets were 9–8–9.)	Safe
4	Tango	"Wait a Minute" — The Pussycat Dolls, feat. Timbaland	9	8	9	52	Safe
5	Rumba	"I Don't Want to Miss a Thing" — Aerosmith	9	9	9	27	Safe
6	Samba	"Hey Mama" — The Black Eyed Peas	7	7	7	21	Safe
6	Swing Marathon	"In the Mood" — Ernie Fields	—N/a			6 (Note: Evan received six points for this dance marathon.)	Safe
7	Argentine tango	"Bust Your Windows" — Jazmine Sullivan	10	10	10	30	Safe
7	Team; Cha-cha-cha	"Holiday" — Madonna	8	8	8	24	Safe
8	Waltz	"Open Arms" — Journey	9	9	9	27	Safe
8	Futuristic; Cha-cha-cha	"Bulletproof" — La Roux	9	8	9	26	Safe
9	Foxtrot	"I've Got the World on a String" — Frank Sinatra	10	9	10	29	Safe
9	Paso doble	"Bring Me to Life" — Evanescence	10	10	10	30	Safe
10 (Night 1)	Viennese waltz	"Piano Man" — Billy Joel	10	9	9	28	Safe
10 (Night 1)	Freestyle	"Footloose" — Kenny Loggins	8	8	8	24	Safe
10 (Night 1)	Argentine tango	"Bust Your Windows" — Jazmine Sullivan	—N/a			28 (Note: All three finalists performed the Argentine tango and were ranked by the judges. Evan received 28 points for being ranked second.)	Safe
10 (Night 2)	Quickstep	"I Want You to Want Me" — Letters To Cleo	10	9	9	28	Runner-up

== Programs ==
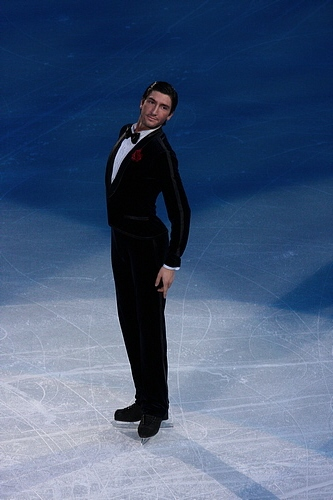
Lysacek performs his exhibition at the 2010 Winter Olympics.

=== Post-2014 ===
Season	Free skating	Exhibition
2014–2015	El Tango de Roxanne (from Moulin Rouge!) by Sting, Mariano Mores	Black Swan (soundtrack) by Clint Mansell; Take Me to Church by Hozier; Latch by Disclosure

=== Pre-2014 ===
Season	Short program	Free skating	Exhibition
2013–2014	Not shown in competitions: Black Swan (soundtrack) by Clint Mansell choreo. by Lori Nichol	Not shown in competitions: Don Quixote by Léon Minkus choreo. by Lori Nichol; Not shown in competitions: Samson and Delilah by Camille Saint-Saëns choreo. by Lori Nichol	Black Swan (soundtrack) by Clint Mansell; Samson and Delilah by Camille Saint-Saëns
2012–2013	Not shown in competitions: Poeta by Vicente Amigo choreo. by Lori Nichol	Not shown in competitions: Mon cœur s'ouvre à ta voix from Samson and Delilah by Camille Saint-Saëns choreo. by Lori Nichol	Poeta by Vicente Amigo
2011–2012 2010–2011	Did not compete		The Climb performed by David Hernandez; El Tango de Roxanne (from Moulin Rouge!) by Sting, Mariano Mores performed by José Feliciano; The Nutcracker by Pyotr Ilyich Tchaikovsky
2009–2010	The Firebird by Igor Stravinsky choreo. by Lori Nichol	Scheherazade by Nikolai Rimsky-Korsakov choreo. by Lori Nichol	An American in Paris by George Gershwin; Around the World by Frank Sinatra; Man in the Mirror by Michael Jackson
2008–2009	Boléro by Maurice Ravel choreo. by Tatiana Tarasova	An American in Paris by George Gershwin choreo. by Tatiana Tarasova	Seven Nation Army by the White Stripes; Harder, Better, Faster, Stronger by Daft Punk; Stronger by Kanye West; Billie Jean by Michael Jackson; Wall to Wall by Chris Brown; Waterworks by Almost Amy
2007–2008	The Legend of Zorro & The Mask of Zorro by James Horner choreo. by Lori Nichol	Tosca by Giacomo Puccini choreo. by Lori Nichol	Billie Jean by Michael Jackson; Wall to Wall by Chris Brown; Boston by Augustana; Tosca (vocal version) by Giacomo Puccini; Ave Maria by Andrea Bocelli
2006–2007	Passion (from The Last Temptation of Christ) by Peter Gabriel	Carmen Suite by Rodion Shchedrin	One by U2; Forever Young by Youth Group; Ave Maria by Andrea Bocelli; You Really Got Me by Van Halen; Boston by Augustana; I Need You Tonight by INXS
2005–2006	España cañí by Pascual Marquina performed by 101 Strings; Vamos a Bailar performed by Gipsy Kings	Grease arranged by Paul Rudolph; Carmen Suite; Carmen by Georges Bizet, Rodion Shchedrin	Sway by Michael Bublé; Time to Say Goodbye by Andrea Bocelli; Run It! by Chris Brown Get Rhythm by Johnny Cash and Hound Dog by Elvis Presley
2004–2005	España cañí by Pascual Marquina performed by 101 Strings	Singin' in the Rain by the MGM Studio Orchestra	Sway by Michael Bublé
2003–2004	España cañí by Pascual Marquina performed by 101 Strings	Piano Concerto No. 2 by Sergei Rachmaninoff	Time to Say Goodbye by Andrea Bocelli
2002–2003	España cañí by Pascual Marquina performed by 101 Strings	Drop Zone by Hans Zimmer	Time to Say Goodbye by Andrea Bocelli; Desert Rose by Sting
2000–2001	Dreams by C. J. Dolan-Winter	Waltz adapted for cello (Anniversary Waltz) by V. Smailovi; Four Seasons by Antonio Vivaldi modern version "Storm" by Vanessa-Mae	Let's Get Loud by Jennifer Lopez
1999–2000	42nd Street	Romeo and Juliet by Nino Rota, André Rieu	
1998–1999	Gipsy Kings medley	Romeo and Juliet by Nino Rota, André Rieu	

== Competitive highlights ==
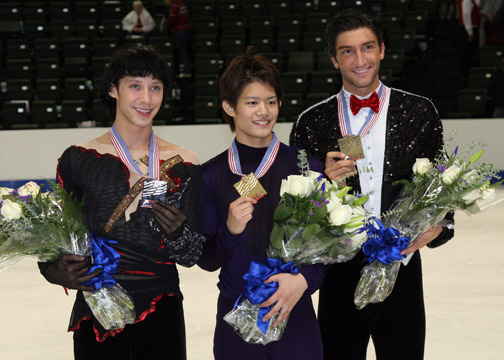
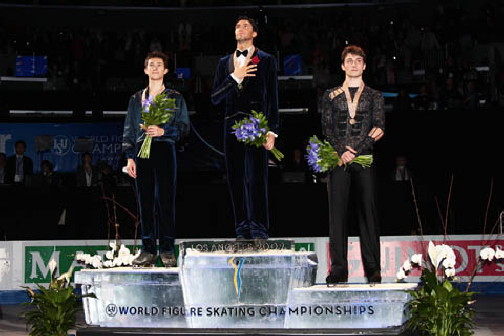
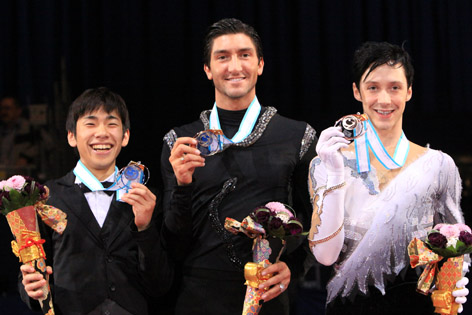
From left to right: the 2008 Skate America podium, the 2009 World Figure Skating Championships podium, and the 2009–10 Grand Prix of Figure Skating Final podium
- GP – Event of the ISU Grand Prix Series
- JGP – Event of the ISU Junior Grand Prix Series
- WD – Withdrew from competition
- Medals at team events are awarded for the team results only. Individual placements at team events are listed in parentheses.

Competition placements at senior level
Season	2000–01	2001–02	2002–03	2003–04	2004–05	2005–06	2006–07	2007–08	2008–09	2009–10
Winter Olympics						4th				1st
World Championships					3rd	3rd	5th		1st	
Four Continents Championships			10th	3rd	1st		1st	3rd	2nd	
Grand Prix Final								3rd		1st
U.S. Championships	12th	12th	7th	5th	3rd	2nd	1st	1st	3rd	2nd
World Team Trophy									1st (1st)	
GP Cup of China							1st	2nd		2nd
GP Cup of Russia					5th					
GP NHK Trophy						2nd				
GP Skate America					5th	2nd	2nd	2nd	3rd	1st
GP Skate Canada									3rd	
Japan Open								3rd (1st)		

Competition placements at junior level
Season	1999–2000	2000–01	2001–02	2002–03	2003–04
World Junior Championships		2nd		2nd	2nd
Junior Grand Prix Final		8th		5th	1st
U.S. Championships	1st				
JGP Canada	7th			2nd	
JGP Croatia					1st
JGP France				2nd	
JGP Germany		2nd			
JGP Japan					1st
JGP Norway		2nd			
JGP Sweden	1st				
Gardena Spring Trophy	2nd				
Triglav Trophy			1st		

== Detailed results ==
ISU personal best scores in the +3/-3 GOE System
Segment	Type	Score	Event
Total	TSS	257.67	2010 Winter Olympics
Short program	TSS	90.30	2010 Winter Olympics
Short program	TES	48.30	2010 Winter Olympics
Short program	PCS	42.00	2010 Winter Olympics
Free skating	TSS	167.37	2010 Winter Olympics
Free skating	TES	84.57	2010 Winter Olympics
Free skating	PCS	84.00	2009–10 Grand Prix Final

=== Senior level ===
Results in the 2000–01 season
Date	Event	SP		FS		Total	
Date	Event	P	Score	P	Score	P	Score
Jan 14–21, 2001	(United States) 2001 U.S. Championships	15	–	11	–	12	–

Results in the 2001–02 season
Date	Event	SP		FS		Total	
Date	Event	P	Score	P	Score	P	Score
Jan 6–13, 2002	(United States) 2002 U.S. Championships	10	–	13	–	12	–

Results in the 2002–03 season
Date	Event	SP		FS		Total	
Date	Event	P	Score	P	Score	P	Score
Jan 12–19, 2003	(United States) 2003 U.S. Championships	9	–	7	–	7	–
Feb 10–16, 2003	(China) 2003 Four Continents Championships	11	–	10	–	10	–

Results in the 2003–04 season
Date	Event	SP		FS		Total	
Date	Event	P	Score	P	Score	P	Score
Jan 3–11, 2004	(United States) 2004 U.S. Championships	3	–	5	–	5	–
Jan 19–25, 2004	(Canada) 2004 Four Continents Championships	4	–	3	–	3	–

Results in the 2004–05 season
Date	Event	SP		FS		Total	
Date	Event	P	Score	P	Score	P	Score
Oct 21–24, 2004	(United States) 2004 Skate America	5	54.87	8	107.64	5	162.51
Nov 25–28, 2004	2004 Cup of Russia	4	61.95	6	110.50	5	172.45
Jan 9–16, 2005	(United States) 2005 U.S. Championships	3	–	3	–	3	–
Feb 14–20, 2005	(South Korea) 2005 Four Continents Championships	5	63.25	1	133.14	1	196.39
Mar 14–20, 2005	(Russia) 2005 World Championships	4	73.42	4	133.74	3	239.29

Results in the 2005–06 season
Date	Event	SP		FS		Total	
Date	Event	P	Score	P	Score	P	Score
Oct 20–23, 2005	(United States) 2005 Skate America	3	67.75	3	125.96	2	193.71
Dec 1–4, 2005	(Japan) 2005 NHK Trophy	3	71.05	1	142.50	2	213.55
Jan 7–15, 2006	(United States) 2006 U.S. Championships	3	74.03	1	150.44	2	224.47
Feb 10–26, 2006	(United States) 2006 Winter Olympics	10	67.55	3	152.58	4	220.13
Mar 19–26, 2006	(Canada) 2006 World Championships	8	70.32	3	149.97	3	255.22

Results in the 2006–07 season
Date	Event	SP		FS		Total	
Date	Event	P	Score	P	Score	P	Score
Oct 25–29, 2006	(United States) 2006 Skate America	3	70.35	1	150.74	2	221.09
Nov 9–12, 2006	2006 Cup of China	2	69.20	1	150.84	1	220.04
Jan 21–28, 2007	(United States) 2007 U.S. Championships	1	78.99	1	169.89	1	248.88
Feb 7–10, 2007	(United States) 2007 Four Continents Championships	4	67.04	1	159.23	1	226.27
Mar 19–25, 2007	(Japan) 2007 World Championships	5	73.49	5	148.69	5	222.18

Results in the 2007–08 season
Date	Event	SP		FS		Total	
Date	Event	P	Score	P	Score	P	Score
Oct 25–28, 2007	(United States) 2007 Skate America	2	67.70	1	152.38	2	220.08
Nov 8–11, 2007	2007 Cup of China	1	81.55	2	147.81	2	229.36
Dec 13–16, 2007	(Italy) 2007–08 Grand Prix Final	3	79.70	3	150.08	3	229.78
Jan 20–27, 2008	(United States) 2008 U.S. Championships	2	82.05	2	162.72	1	244.77
Feb 13–17, 2008	(South Korea) 2008 Four Continents Championships	2	84.06	3	141.91	3	233.11
Apr 20, 2008	2008 Japan Open	–	–	1	151.95	3 (1)	–

Results in the 2008–09 season
Date	Event	SP		FS		Total	
Date	Event	P	Score	P	Score	P	Score
Oct 23–26, 2008	(United States) 2008 Skate America	1	81.30	3	141.91	3	223.21
Oct 30 – Nov 2, 2008	2008 Skate Canada International	4	71.40	4	137.87	3	209.27
Jan 18–25, 2009	(United States) 2009 U.S. Championships	2	83.59	4	145.51	3	229.10
Feb 4–8, 2009	(Canada) 2009 Four Continents Championships	2	81.65	2	155.50	2	237.15
Mar 23–29, 2009	(United States) 2009 World Championships	2	82.70	1	159.53	1	242.23
Apr 16–19, 2009	(Japan) 2009 World Team Trophy	2	83.70	1	154.86	1 (1)	238.56

Results in the 2009–10 season
Date	Event	SP		FS		Total	
Date	Event	P	Score	P	Score	P	Score
Oct 29 – Nov 1, 2009	2009 Cup of China	3	80.80	2	151.37	2	232.17
Nov 12–15, 2009	(United States) 2009 Skate America	1	79.17	1	158.55	1	237.72
Dec 3–6, 2009	(Japan) 2009–10 Grand Prix Final	2	89.85	1	159.60	1	249.45
Jan 14–24, 2010	(United States) 2010 U.S. Championships	2	83.69	3	154.94	2	238.63
Feb 12–28, 2010	(Canada) 2010 Winter Olympics	2	90.30	1	167.37	1	257.67

=== Junior level ===
Results in the 1999–2000 season
Date	Event	SP		FS		Total	
Date	Event	P	Score	P	Score	P	Score
Sep 29 – Oct 3, 1999	1999 JGP Canada	7	–	7	–	7	–
Nov 3–7, 1999	1999 JGP Sweden	4	–	1	–	1	–
Feb 6–13, 2000	(United States) 2000 U.S. Championships (Junior)	5	–	1	–	1	–
Mar 29 – Apr 3, 2000	(Italy) 2000 Gardena Spring Trophy		–		–	2	–

Results in the 2000–01 season
Date	Event	SP		FS		Total	
Date	Event	P	Score	P	Score	P	Score
Oct 5–8, 2000	2000 JGP Germany	2	–	2	–	2	–
Nov 2–5, 2000	2000 JGP Norway	3	–	2	–	2	–
Dec 14–17, 2000	(United Kingdom) 2000–01 JGP Final	7	–	7	–	8	–
Feb 26 – Mar 2, 2001	(Bulgaria) 2001 World Junior Championships	2	–	3	–	2	–

Results in the 2001–02 season
Date	Event	SP		FS		Total	
Date	Event	P	Score	P	Score	P	Score
Apr 18–21, 2002	(Slovenia) 2002 Triglav Trophy	3	–	1	–	1	–

Results in the 2002–03 season
Date	Event	SP		FS		Total	
Date	Event	P	Score	P	Score	P	Score
Aug 21–25, 2002	2002 JGP France	1	–	2	–	2	–
Sep 26–29, 2002	2002 JGP Canada	1	–	2	–	2	–
Dec 12–15, 2002	(Netherlands) 2002–03 JGP Final	7	–	4	–	5	–
Feb 24 – Mar 2, 2003	(Czech Republic) 2003 World Junior Championships	1	–	2	–	2	–

Results in the 2003–04 season
Date	Event	SP		FS		Total	
Date	Event	P	Score	P	Score	P	Score
Oct 16–19, 2003	2003 JGP Japan	1	–	1	–	1	–
Oct 22–26, 2003	2003 JGP Croatia	1	–	1	–	1	–
Dec 11–14, 2003	(Sweden) 2003–04 JGP Final	1	–	1	–	1	–
Feb 29 – Mar 7, 2004	(Netherlands) 2004 World Junior Championships	2	–	2	–	2	–

Awards and achievements
Preceded by Todd Lodwick	USOC Sportsman of the Year; 2010	Succeeded by Michael Phelps
