= Artem Borodulin =

Russian former competitive figure skater

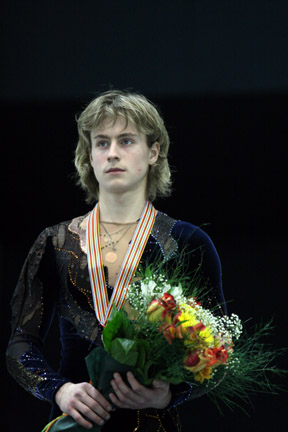
- Borodulin in 2008.

Personal information
- Full name: Artem Igorevich Borodulin
- Born: 9 March 1989 (age 37) Perm, Russian SFSR, Soviet Union
- Height: 1.71 m (5 ft 7 in)

Figure skating career
- Country: Russia
- Skating club: CSKA Moscow
- Began skating: 1994
- Retired: 2013
Medal record
Representing Russia
Figure skating: Men's singles
Winter Universiade
Silver medal – second place	2009 Harbin	Men's singles
Russian Championships
Silver medal – second place	2009 Kazan	Men’s Singles
Bronze medal – third place	2010 Saint Petersburg	Men’s Singles
World Junior Championships
Silver medal – second place	2008 Sofia	Men's singles

Artem Igorevich Borodulin (Russian: Артём Игоревич Бородулин, born 9 March 1989) is a Russian former competitive figure skater. He is the 2008 World Junior silver medalist and competed at the 2010 Winter Olympics, finishing 13th.

== Personal life ==
Artem Borodulin was born on 9 March 1989 in Perm, Russian SFSR, Soviet Union. His younger brother, Sergei, has also competed in figure skating. The brothers moved to Moscow in spring 2006.

== Career ==
Artem Borodulin began skating at age 5. He made his ISU Junior Grand Prix (JGP) debut in 2005. In spring 2006, he relocated from Perm to Moscow. He won two silver medals in the 2006 JGP series. He finished 7th at the 2007 World Junior Championships in Oberstdorf after placing 8th in the short program and 7th in the free skate.

Borodulin won bronze in Vienna and gold in Sofia during the 2007 JGP season. He broke his right ankle while practicing in November 2007 and returned to the ice in early January 2008. At the 2008 World Junior Championships in Sofia, he ranked second in both segments and was awarded the silver medal behind Adam Rippon.

Borodulin's first senior ISU Championship was the 2009 Europeans in Helsinki, Finland. He finished 13th after placing 15th in the short program and 12th in the free skate.

He represented Russia at the 2010 Winter Olympics in Vancouver. Ranked 13th in the short and 12th in the free, he finished 13th overall. He was also sent to the 2010 World Championships in Turin but his skate blade broke as he competed in the short program, forcing his withdrawal. The likelihood of such an event is 1 in 10,000.

== Programs ==
Season	Short program	Free skating
2011–12	The Skaters Waltz by J. Meyerbeer	Angels & Demons by Hans Zimmer; One Man's Dream by Yanni; Angels & Demons
2010–11	Polka by Alfred Schnittke	The Juggler by unknown
2009–10	Kalinka	Tango de Roxanne (from Moulin Rouge!); Assassin's Tango (from Mr. & Mrs. Smith)
2008–09	Yablochko (from The Red Poppy) by Reinhold Glière	Tango de Roxanne (from Moulin Rouge!); Assassin's Tango (from Mr. & Mrs. Smith)
2007–08	Yablochko (from The Red Poppy) by Reinhold Glière	Berlin Concerto
2006–07	Liebestraum by Franz Liszt	Berlin Concerto

== Competitive highlights ==
GP: Grand Prix; JGP: Junior Grand Prix

International
Event	04–05	05–06	06–07	07–08	08–09	09–10	11–12	12–13
Olympics						13th		
Europeans					13th			
GP Cup of China					4th			
GP Cup of Russia					9th	3rd		
GP NHK Trophy						8th		
Finlandia							10th	
Golden Spin						2nd	4th	
Nepela Memorial								5th
Universiade					2nd			
International: Junior
Junior Worlds			7th	2nd				
JGP Final			7th	WD				
JGP Andorra		5th						
JGP Austria				3rd				
JGP Bulgaria		4th		1st				
JGP Netherlands			2nd					
JGP Romania			2nd					
National
Russian Champ.	15th	14th	8th		2nd	3rd	11th	
Russian Junior	7th	7th	2nd					
WD: Withdrew
