= Vaughn Chipeur =

Retired Canadian figure skater (born 1984)

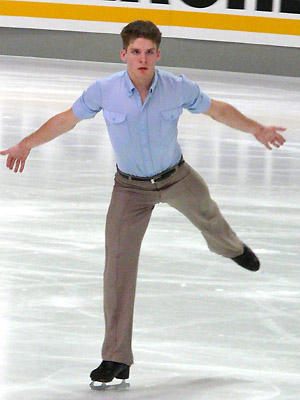
- Chipeur in 2007

Personal information
- Born: December 21, 1984 (age 41) Lloydminster, Saskatchewan
- Home town: Edmonton, Alberta
- Height: 1.70 m (5 ft 7 in)

Figure skating career
- Country: Canada
- Skating club: The Royal Glenora Club
- Began skating: 1990
- Retired: 2010
Medal record
Figure skating: Men's singles
Representing Canada
World Team Trophy
Silver medal – second place	2009 Tokyo	Team

Vaughn Chipeur (born December 21, 1984) is a former Canadian figure skater and figure-skating coach. He currently resides in Edmonton, Alberta. Chipeur is also the Figure Skate Technical Representative and Brand Ambassador for TRUE Temper Sports.

He is the 2009 & 2010 Canadian silver medalist and won the bronze medal at the 2006 Nebelhorn Trophy.

Chipeur began skating at age six. At the 2010 Canadian Figure Skating Championships, he was nominated to represent Canada at the 2010 Winter Olympics. He placed 23rd in the men's event. On July 15, 2010, Chipeur announced his retirement from competitive figure skating.

== Competitive programs ==
Season	Short program	Free skating	Exhibition
2009–10	Come on Baby by Joe Satriani; Cliffs of Dover by Eric Johnson	Go Chango by Les Baxter; Harlem Nocturne by Earle Hagen and Dick Rogers; Topsy by Eddie Durham	
2008–09	Come on Baby (from Professor Satchafunkilus) by Joe Satriani	Broken Sorrow (from Subway to the Charts) by Nuttin But Stringz; First Impressions (from Appalachian Waltzes) by Edgar Meyer performed by Yo Yo Ma; Tachan (from Turbo) by Hovan Drovan	Angel by Robbie Williams
2007–08	A Blues Concerto - Movement 3 by Russo; A Blues Concerto Movement 4 by Russo performed by Corky Siegal, Harmonica, and the San Francisco Symphony	Dances with Wolves by John Barry; Out of Africa by John Barry; Zulu by John Barry	
2006–07	Enter Sandman; Nothing Else Matters by Metallica	Phantom of the Opera by Andrew Lloyd Webber	
2003–04	No Leafclover by Metallica	Medley by George S. Clinton	
2002–03	Late Lounge Lover (3rd Door Left) by Hacienda	The Rock; Hummell Gets the Rockets; Rocket Away	

== Competitive results ==
GP: Grand Prix; JGP: Junior Grand Prix

International
Event	02–03	03–04	04–05	05–06	06–07	07–08	08–09	09–10
Olympics								23rd
Worlds							12th	
Four Continents						7th	6th	
GP Bompard								12th
GP Cup of China							5th	
GP Cup of Russia							12th	
GP NHK Trophy						11th		11th
GP Skate Canada					7th	5th		
Nebelhorn Trophy					3rd	6th		
Triglav Trophy		3rd						
International: Junior
JGP Germany	7th							
JGP Mexico		4th						
JGP Poland		7th						
National
Canadian Champ.	3rd J	3rd J	11th	16th	7th	4th	2nd	2nd
Team events
World Team; Trophy							2nd T 6th P	
J = Junior; T = Team result; P = Personal result. Medals awarded for team result only.
