= Juergen Mayer =

Austrian bobsledder

Juergen Mayer (sometimes listed as Jürgen Mayer, born 4 November 1976) is an Austrian bobsledder who has competed since 2007. His best World Cup finish was third in a four-man event at Lake Placid, New York, on 22 November 2009.

At the FIBT World Championships, Mayer earned his best finish of eighth twice in the four-man event (2008, 2009).

At the 2010 Winter Olympics in Vancouver, he was disqualified in the two-man event while crashing out in the four-man event.
