= Doris Günther =

Austrian snowboarder (born 1978)

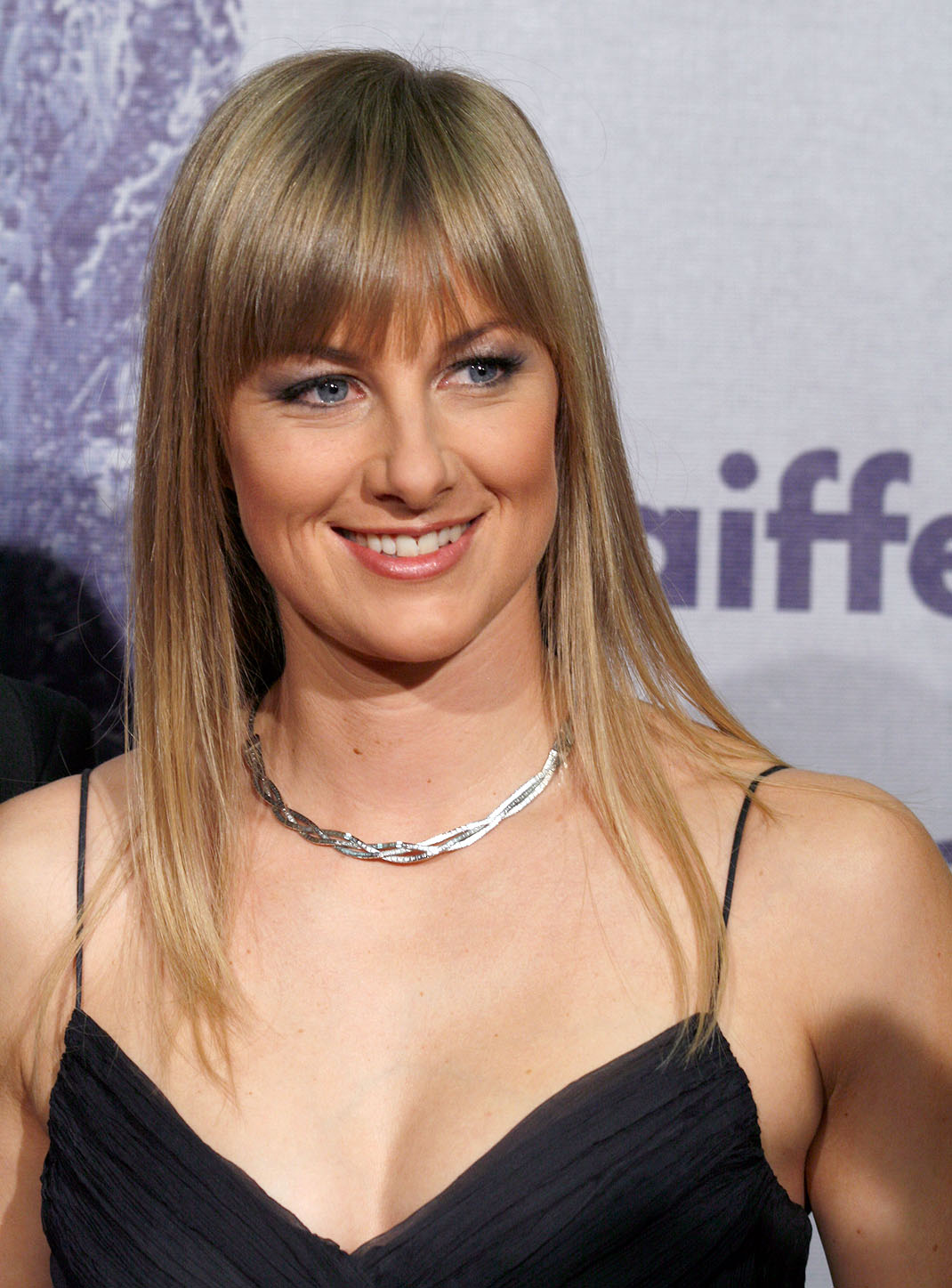
- Günther in 2009

Medal record

Women's snowboarding

Representing Austria

World Championships
Silver medal – second place	2009 Gangwon	Parallel GS
Silver medal – second place	2009 Gangwon	Parallel slalom
Bronze medal – third place	2011 La Molina	Parallel GS

Doris Günther (born 3 May 1978 in Zell am See) is a snowboarder from Austria. She competed for Austria at the 2010 Winter Olympics in parallel giant slalom, finishing ninth. Günther later captured a bronze medal at the 2011 FIS Snowboarding World Championships. She had previously won two silver medals at the 2009 FIS Snowboarding World Championships.
