= Christian Hackl =

Austrian bobsledder (born 1981)

Christian Hackl (born 22 September 1981) is an Austrian bobsledder who has competed since 2004. At the 2010 Winter Olympics, he finished 18th in the two-man event while crashing out in the four-man event.

Hackl finished 11th in the four-man event at the FIBT World Championships 2007 in St. Moritz. His best World Cup finish was 8th place in the four-man event at Königsee in 2008.
