= Hilde-Katrine Engeli =

Norwegian snowboarder (born 1988)

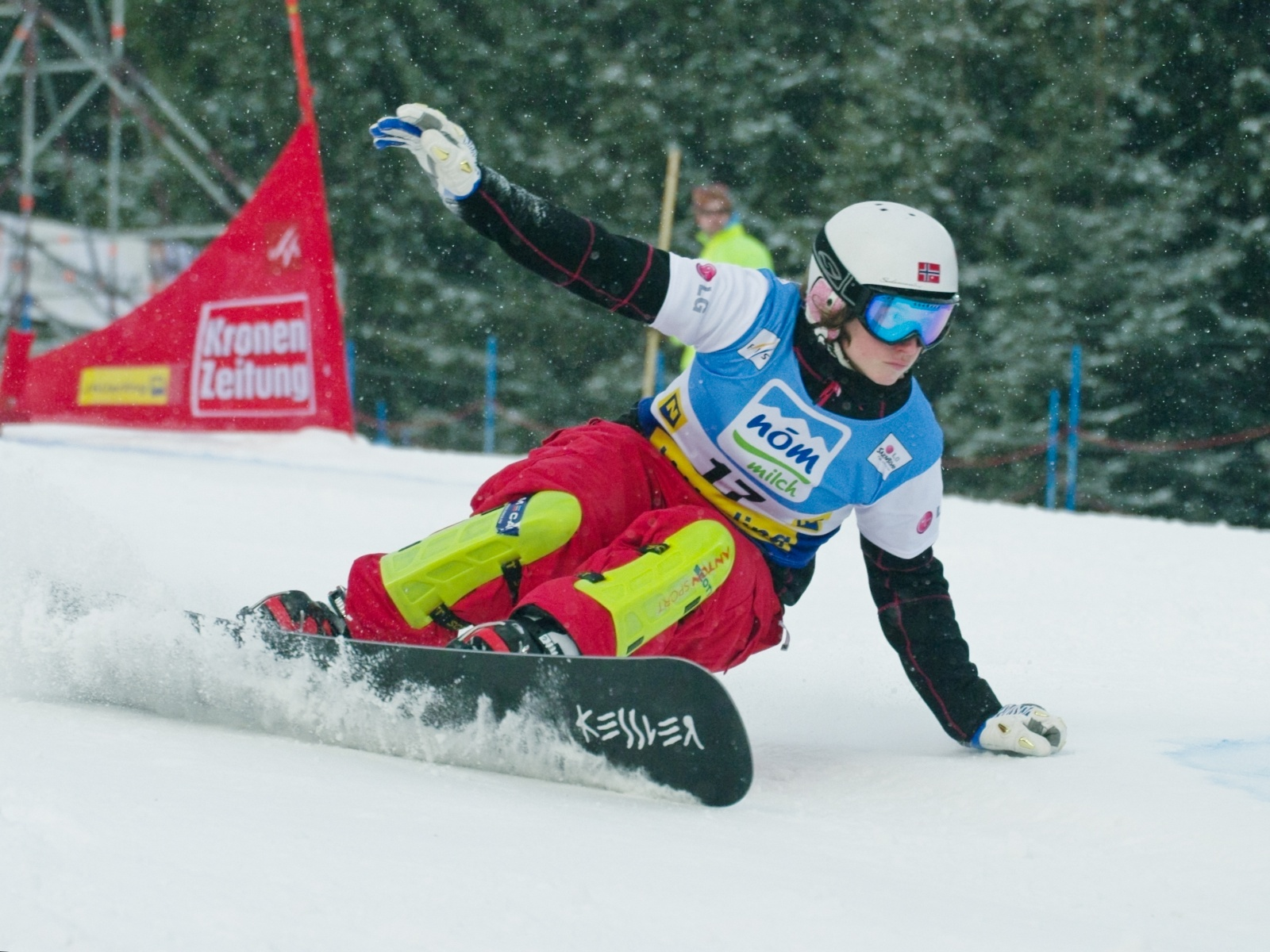
- Engeli in 2012

Personal information
- Born: 4 August 1988 (age 37) Dombås, Norway
- Height: 174 cm (5 ft 9 in) (2014)
Medal record
Representing Norway
FIS Snowboarding World Championships
Gold medal – first place	2011 La Molina	Parallel slalom

Hilde-Katrine Engeli (born 4 August 1988) is a snowboarder from Norway.

== Career ==
She won a gold medal at the 2011 FIS Snowboarding World Championships in the parallel slalom event.
