= Caroline Calvé =

Canadian snowboarder

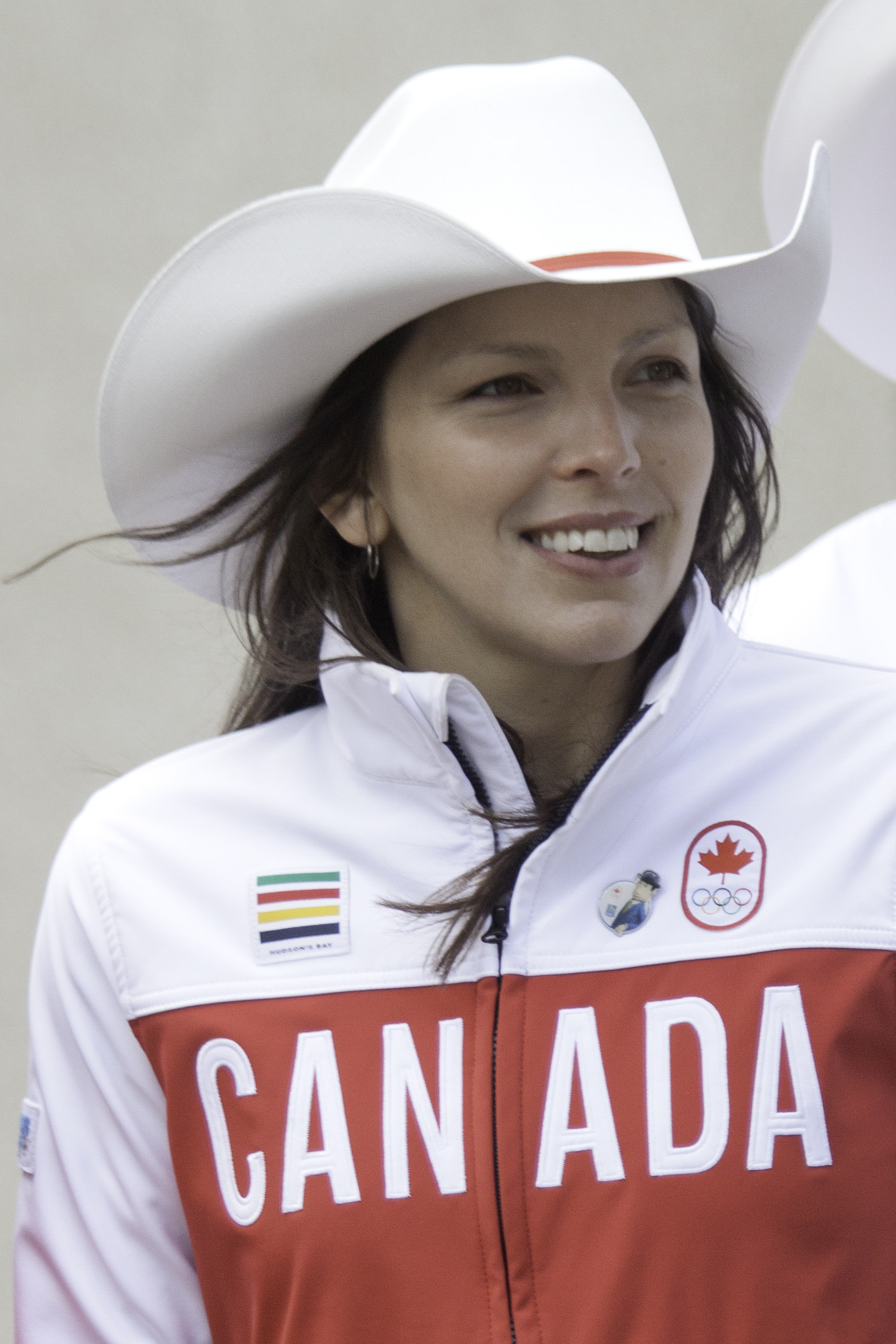
- Calvé in Parade of Excellence, Calgary, 2014

Personal information
- Born: 1 October 1978 (age 46); Hull, Quebec, Canada (now Gatineau, Quebec)
- Height: 1.77 m (5 ft 10 in)
- Weight: 74 kg (163 lb)
- Spouse: {Adam McLeish}
- Website: carolinecalve.com

Sport
- Country: Canada
- Sport: Snowboarding
- Event(s): Parallel slalom Parallel giant slalom

Caroline Calvé (born 1 October 1978) is a Canadian snowboarder. As a child, Skiing was the first sport she took interest in, and later on became a coach and certified instructor. At age 21, she made her snowboarding debut, and prepared for the Olympic Games.

She competed at the 2010 Winter Olympics in Vancouver in the women's parallel giant slalom competition. After taking 20th place, her breakthrough began in December 2011 when she received gold in the women's parallel giant slalom in Carezza, Italy. She was represented as the first female Canadian athlete to win and lead a Snowboard Alpine World cup. Calvé then followed this success by winning a silver medal at the 2011 Giant Slalom World cup the next year. Her successful career went on as she placed 4th in the Rogla, Slovenia event on 8 February 2013, finishing 3rd in the standings of the World cup in Parallel slalom before concluding her season.

"In addition to representing Canada, Calvé proudly represents her aboriginal roots. Her paternal great-grandmother is of Algonquin heritage. 'I certainly try to be a role model for aboriginal kids, but also for all little Canadians out there who aspire to great things,' said Calvé. 'With my experience as a person who hasn't been an athlete their whole life, it can be a great model to achieve anything you want in your life.'"

Calvé is very much a part of First Nations Athletic organizations seeking to uphold equality and respect to their aboriginal heritage. She continues to work closely with the First Nations snowboarding team, promoting values such as honor, commitment and performance, qualities Calvé wishes to uphold throughout her entire career.
