= Nathalie Desmares =

French snowboarder (born 1972)

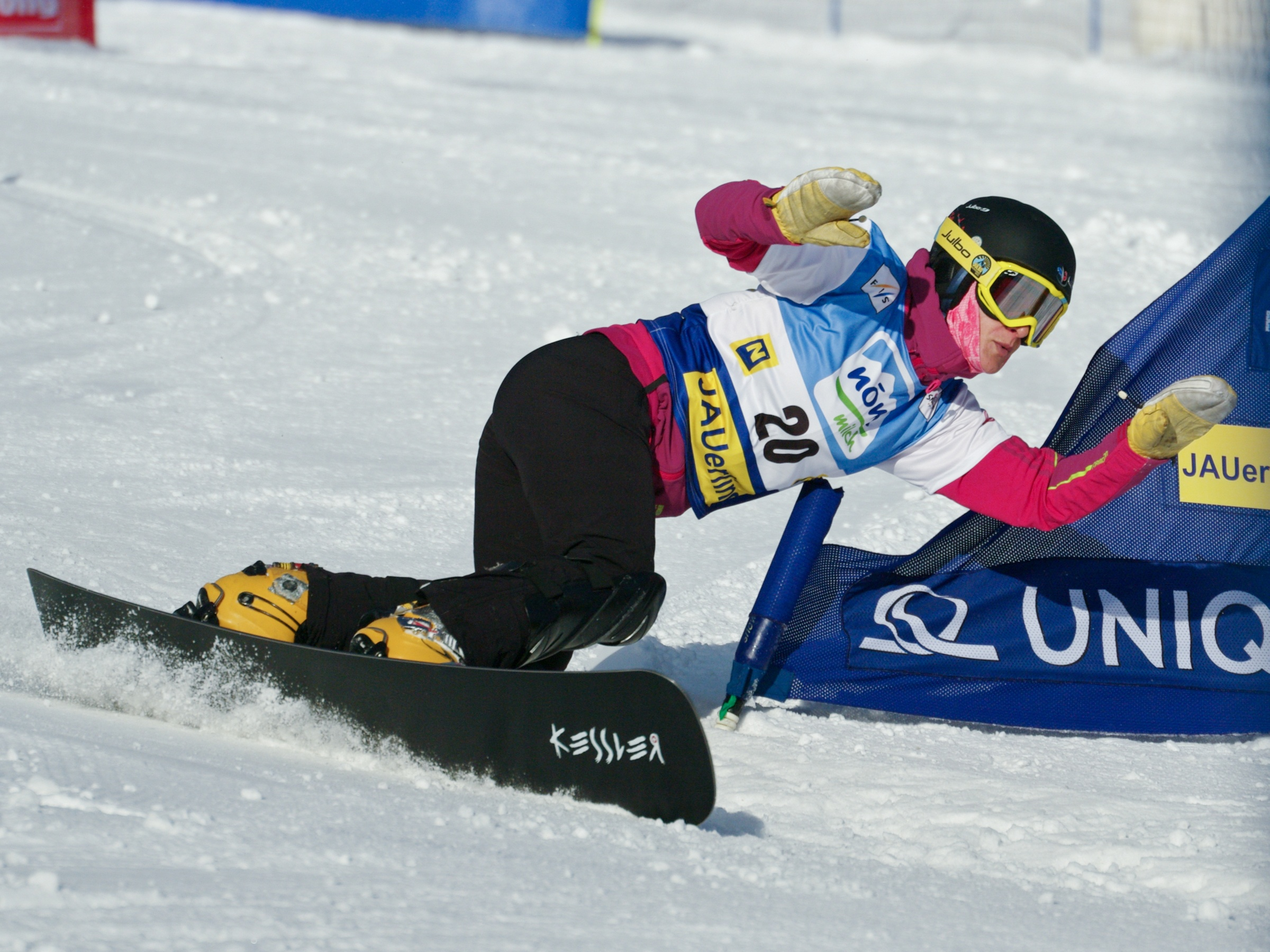
- Desmares in 2012

Personal information
- Nationality: French
- Born: 18 May 1972 (age 53) L'Aigle, France

Sport
- Country: France
- Sport: Snowboarding

Nathalie Desmares (born 18 May 1972) is a French snowboarder.

She was born in L'Aigle. She competed at the 1998 Winter Olympics in Nagano, in women's giant slalom, and she competed at the 2010 Winter Olympics in Vancouver, in women's parallel giant slalom.

Desmares competed in the Parallel giant slalom with Sylvain Dufour as a partner in 2018.
