= Ilona Ruotsalainen =

Finnish snowboarder

Personal information
- Nationality: Finnish
- Born: 8 January 1981 (age 44); Jyväskylä, Finland

Sport
- Country: Finland
- Sport: Snowboarding

Ilona Ruotsalainen (born 8 January 1981) is a Finnish snowboarder.

She was born in Jyväskylä. She competed at the 2010 Winter Olympics, in women's parallel giant slalom.
