= Camille de Faucompret =

French snowboarder (born 1985)

Personal information
- Nationality: French
- Born: 12 December 1985 (age 40)

Sport
- Sport: Snowboarding

Camille de Faucompret (born 12 December 1985 in Pau, Pyrénées-Atlantiques) is a French snowboarder. She placed 11th in the women's parallel giant slalom event at the 2010 Winter Olympics.

== Biography ==
The snowboarder from Pau made her FIS Snowboard World Cup debut in January 2006 by competing in the parallel giant slalom in Nendaz, Switzerland, from which she was disqualified.

On May 8, 2009, Camille de Faucompret and kayaker Éric Deguil became the first two athletes in their respective disciplines to descend the slopes of a volcano. They accomplished this feat on the slopes of Pico do Fogo in Cape Verde, an active volcano with a slope of approximately 40 degrees.

In 2010, she was selected to compete in the Vancouver Winter Olympics, where she finished 11th in the parallel giant slalom event held at Cypress Mountain Ski Area, being eliminated in the round of 16.

She achieved the best World Cup result of her career a month after the Games, finishing fourth in the parallel giant slalom in La Molina (ski resort), Spain. A few months later, she achieved her final significant results with top-ten finishes in Limone Piemonte in the parallel giant slalom (9th) and parallel slalom (9th), and then in Telluride, Colorado, United States, with a 5th-place finish in the parallel giant slalom.

Camille de Faucompret has won four French national titles: in 2007 in Saint-Gervais-les-Bains, in 2009 in Risoul, in 2010 in L'Alpe d'Huez, and in 2012 in Le Grand-Bornand, even though she hadn't competed in a race for a yearref.
