= List of 2010 Winter Olympics medal winners =

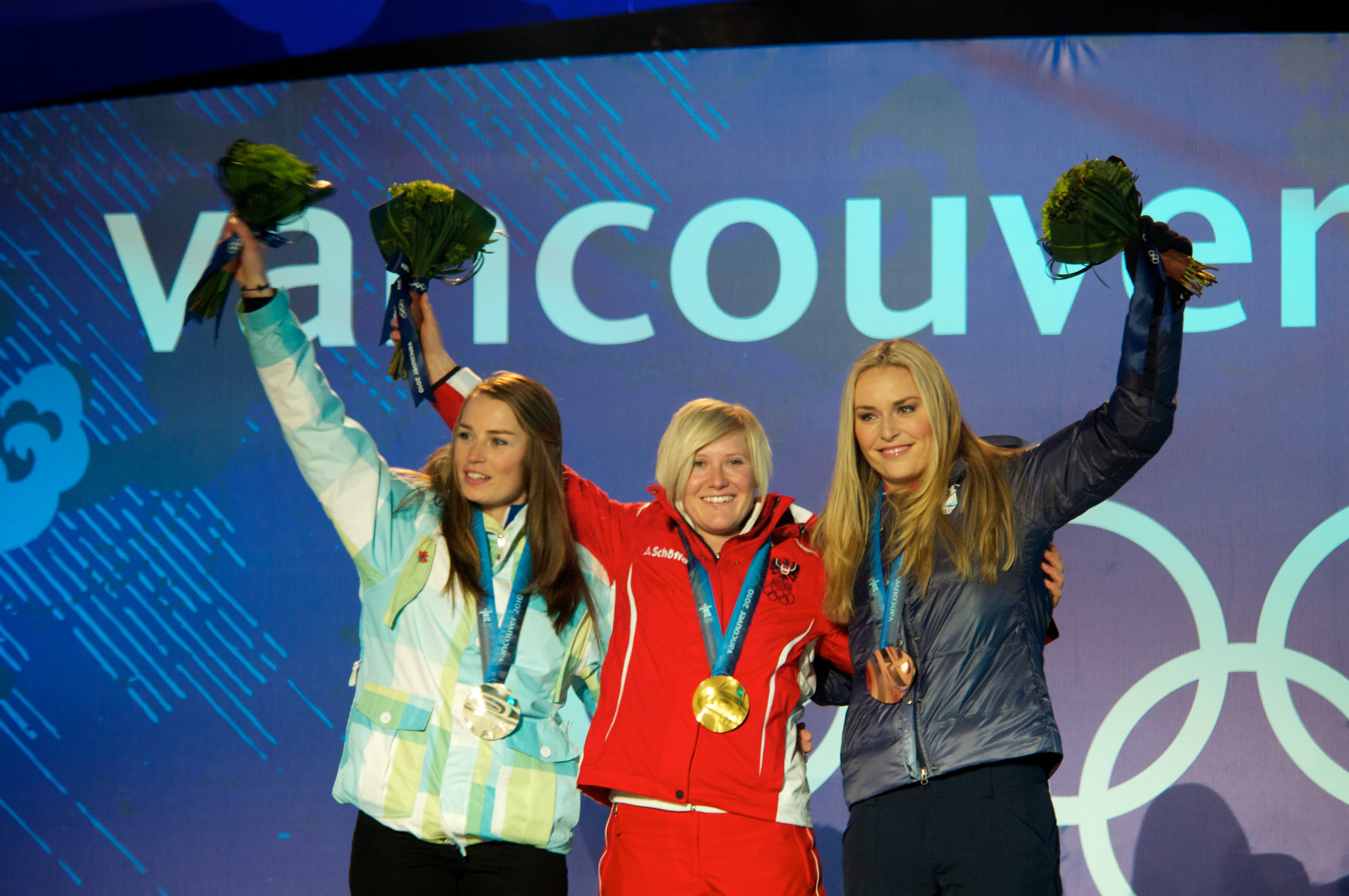
From left to right: Tina Maze of Slovenia (silver), Andrea Fischbacher of Austria (gold) and Lindsey Vonn of the United States (bronze) with the medals they earned in women's super-G in alpine skiing.

The 2010 Winter Olympics were held in Vancouver, British Columbia, Canada, from February 12 to February 28, 2010. A total of 2,632 athletes representing 82 National Olympic Committees participated in these Games. Overall, 86 events in 15 disciplines were contested; 46 events were open to men, 38 to women and 2 were mixed pairs. Two disciplines were open only to men: Nordic combined and ski jumping, while figure skating was the only sport in which men and women competed together in teams. Two new events were introduced: men's and women's ski cross.

Medals were won by 450 individual athletes from 26 countries; 19 of those countries won at least one gold. Canada won its first gold medal at an Olympic Games it hosted, having failed to do so at both the 1976 Summer Olympics in Montreal and the 1988 Winter Olympics in Calgary. Canada finished first in gold medal wins and became the first host nation since Norway in 1952 to lead the gold medal count, with 14. Canada also broke the record for the most golds won at a single Winter Olympics, which was previously 13, set by the Soviet Union in 1976 and Norway in 2002. The United States placed first in total medals—its second time doing so in a Winter Games—and set a record for most medals won at a single Winter Olympics, with 37, breaking the previous record of 36, set by Germany in 2002.

In the men's individual event in biathlon, two silver medals were awarded for a second-place tie. No bronze medal was awarded for that event. Athletes from Slovakia (Anastasiya Kuzmina – biathlon, women's sprint) and Belarus (Aleksei Grishin – freestyle skiing, men's aerials) won the first Winter Olympic gold medals for their nations. Norwegian cross-country skier Marit Bjørgen was the most successful athlete, winning three gold, one silver and one bronze medal, and became the ninth Winter Olympian to win five medals at one edition of the Games. Chinese short-track speed skater Wang Meng also won three gold medals.

== Alpine skiing ==
Event	Gold	Silver	Bronze
Men's slalom	Giuliano Razzoli; Italy	Ivica Kostelić; Croatia	André Myhrer; Sweden
Men's giant slalom	Carlo Janka; Switzerland	Kjetil Jansrud; Norway	Aksel Lund Svindal; Norway
Men's super-G	Aksel Lund Svindal; Norway	Bode Miller; United States	Andrew Weibrecht; United States
Men's downhill	Didier Défago; Switzerland	Aksel Lund Svindal; Norway	Bode Miller; United States
Men's combined	Bode Miller; United States	Ivica Kostelić; Croatia	Silvan Zurbriggen; Switzerland
Women's slalom	Maria Riesch; Germany	Marlies Schild; Austria	Šárka Záhrobská; Czech Republic
Women's giant slalom	Viktoria Rebensburg; Germany	Tina Maze; Slovenia	Elisabeth Görgl; Austria
Women's super-G	Andrea Fischbacher; Austria	Tina Maze; Slovenia	Lindsey Vonn; United States
Women's downhill	Lindsey Vonn; United States	Julia Mancuso; United States	Elisabeth Görgl; Austria
Women's combined	Maria Riesch; Germany	Julia Mancuso; United States	Anja Pärson; Sweden

== Biathlon ==
Event	Gold	Silver	Bronze
Men's 10 km sprint	Vincent Jay; France	Emil Hegle Svendsen; Norway	Jakov Fak; Croatia
Men's 12.5 km pursuit	Björn Ferry; Sweden	Christoph Sumann; Austria	Vincent Jay; France
Men's 15 km mass start	Martin Fourcade; France	Pavol Hurajt; Slovakia	Christoph Sumann; Austria
Men's 20 km individual	Emil Hegle Svendsen; Norway	Ole Einar Bjørndalen; Norway	shared silver
Men's 20 km individual	Emil Hegle Svendsen; Norway	Sergey Novikov; Belarus	shared silver
Men's 4 × 7.5 km relay	Norway; Halvard Hanevold; Tarjei Bø; Emil Hegle Svendsen; Ole Einar Bjørndalen	Austria; Simon Eder; Daniel Mesotitsch; Dominik Landertinger; Christoph Sumann	Russia; Ivan Tcherezov; Anton Shipulin; Maxim Tchoudov; Evgeny Ustyugov
Women's 7.5 km sprint	Anastasiya Kuzmina; Slovakia	Magdalena Neuner; Germany	Marie Dorin; France
Women's 10 km pursuit	Magdalena Neuner; Germany	Anastasiya Kuzmina; Slovakia	Marie-Laure Brunet; France
Women's 12.5 km mass start	Magdalena Neuner; Germany	Olga Zaitseva; Russia	Simone Hauswald; Germany
Women's 15 km individual	Tora Berger; Norway	Elena Khrustaleva; Kazakhstan	Darya Domracheva; Belarus
Women's 4 × 6 km relay	Russia; Svetlana Sleptsova; Anna Bogaliy-Titovets; Olga Medvedtseva; Olga Zaitseva	France; Marie-Laure Brunet; Sylvie Becaert; Marie Dorin; Sandrine Bailly	Germany; Kati Wilhelm; Simone Hauswald; Martina Beck; Andrea Henkel

== Bobsleigh ==
Event	Gold	Silver	Bronze
Two-man	Germany; André Lange; Kevin Kuske	Germany; Thomas Florschütz; Richard Adjei	Russia; Alexandr Zubkov; Alexey Voyevoda
Four-man	United States; Steve Holcomb; Steve Mesler; Curtis Tomasevicz; Justin Olsen	Germany; André Lange; Kevin Kuske; Alexander Rödiger; Martin Putze	Canada; Lyndon Rush; David Bissett; Lascelles Brown; Chris le Bihan
Two-woman	Canada; Kaillie Humphries; Heather Moyse	Canada; Helen Upperton; Shelley-Ann Brown	United States; Erin Pac; Elana Meyers

== Cross-country skiing ==
Event	Gold	Silver	Bronze
Men's sprint	Nikita Kriukov; Russia	Alexander Panzhinskiy; Russia	Petter Northug; Norway
Men's 15 km	Dario Cologna; Switzerland	Pietro Piller Cottrer; Italy	Lukáš Bauer; Czech Republic
Men's 30 km pursuit	Marcus Hellner; Sweden	Tobias Angerer; Germany	Johan Olsson; Sweden
Men's 50 km	Petter Northug; Norway	Axel Teichmann; Germany	Johan Olsson; Sweden
Men's team sprint	Norway; Øystein Pettersen; Petter Northug	Germany; Tim Tscharnke; Axel Teichmann	Russia; Nikolay Morilov; Alexey Petukhov
Men's 4 x 10 km relay	Sweden; Daniel Rickardsson; Johan Olsson; Anders Södergren; Marcus Hellner	Norway; Martin Johnsrud Sundby; Odd-Bjørn Hjelmeset; Lars Berger; Petter Northug	Czech Republic; Martin Jakš; Lukáš Bauer; Jiří Magál; Martin Koukal
Women's sprint	Marit Bjørgen; Norway	Justyna Kowalczyk; Poland	Petra Majdič; Slovenia
Women's 10 km	Charlotte Kalla; Sweden	Kristina Šmigun-Vähi; Estonia	Marit Bjørgen; Norway
Women's 15 km pursuit	Marit Bjørgen; Norway	Anna Haag; Sweden	Justyna Kowalczyk; Poland
Women's 30 km	Justyna Kowalczyk; Poland	Marit Bjørgen; Norway	Aino-Kaisa Saarinen; Finland
Women's team sprint	Germany; Evi Sachenbacher-Stehle; Claudia Nystad	Sweden; Charlotte Kalla; Anna Haag	Russia; Irina Khazova; Natalya Korostelyova
Women's 4 x 5 km relay	Norway; Vibeke Skofterud; Therese Johaug; Kristin Størmer Steira; Marit Bjørgen	Germany; Katrin Zeller; Evi Sachenbacher-Stehle; Miriam Gössner; Claudia Nystad	Finland; Pirjo Muranen; Virpi Kuitunen; Riitta-Liisa Roponen; Aino-Kaisa Saarinen

== Curling ==
Event	Gold	Silver	Bronze
Men's team	Canada; Kevin Martin; John Morris; Marc Kennedy; Ben Hebert; Adam Enright	Norway; Thomas Ulsrud; Torger Nergård; Christoffer Svae; Håvard Vad Petersson; Thomas Løvold	Switzerland; Ralph Stöckli; Jan Hauser; Markus Eggler; Simon Strübin; Toni Müller
Women's team	Sweden; Anette Norberg; Eva Lund; Cathrine Lindahl; Anna Le Moine; Kajsa Bergström	Canada; Cheryl Bernard; Susan O'Connor; Carolyn Darbyshire; Cori Bartel; Kristie Moore	China; Wang Bingyu; Liu Yin; Yue Qingshuang; Zhou Yan; Liu Jinli

== Figure skating ==
Event	Gold	Silver	Bronze
Men's singles	Evan Lysacek; United States	Evgeni Plushenko; Russia	Daisuke Takahashi; Japan
Women's singles	Kim Yuna; South Korea	Mao Asada; Japan	Joannie Rochette; Canada
Pairs	China; Shen Xue; Zhao Hongbo	China; Pang Qing; Tong Jian	Germany; Aliona Savchenko; Robin Szolkowy
Ice dancing	Canada; Tessa Virtue; Scott Moir	United States; Meryl Davis; Charlie White	Russia; Oksana Domnina; Maxim Shabalin

== Freestyle skiing ==
Event	Gold	Silver	Bronze
Men's moguls	Alexandre Bilodeau; Canada	Dale Begg-Smith; Australia	Bryon Wilson; United States
Men's aerials	Aleksei Grishin; Belarus	Jeret Peterson; United States	Liu Zhongqing; China
Men's ski cross	Michael Schmid; Switzerland	Andreas Matt; Austria	Audun Grønvold; Norway
Women's moguls	Hannah Kearney; United States	Jennifer Heil; Canada	Shannon Bahrke; United States
Women's aerials	Lydia Lassila; Australia	Li Nina; China	Guo Xinxin; China
Women's ski cross	Ashleigh McIvor; Canada	Hedda Berntsen; Norway	Marion Josserand; France

== Ice hockey ==
Event	Gold	Silver	Bronze
Men's team	Canada; Patrice Bergeron; Dan Boyle; Martin Brodeur; Sidney Crosby; Drew Doughty; Marc-André Fleury; Ryan Getzlaf; Dany Heatley; Jarome Iginla; Duncan Keith; Roberto Luongo; Patrick Marleau; Brenden Morrow; Rick Nash; Scott Niedermayer; Corey Perry; Chris Pronger; Mike Richards; Brent Seabrook; Eric Staal; Joe Thornton; Jonathan Toews; Shea Weber	United States; David Backes; Dustin Brown; Ryan Callahan; Chris Drury; Tim Gleason; Erik Johnson; Jack Johnson; Patrick Kane; Ryan Kesler; Phil Kessel; Jamie Langenbrunner; Ryan Malone; Ryan Miller; Brooks Orpik; Zach Parise; Joe Pavelski; Jonathan Quick; Brian Rafalski; Bobby Ryan; Paul Stastny; Ryan Suter; Tim Thomas; Ryan Whitney	Finland; Niklas Bäckström; Valtteri Filppula; Niklas Hagman; Jarkko Immonen; Olli Jokinen; Niko Kapanen; Miikka Kiprusoff; Mikko Koivu; Saku Koivu; Lasse Kukkonen; Jere Lehtinen; Sami Lepistö; Toni Lydman; Antti Miettinen; Antero Niittymäki; Janne Niskala; Ville Peltonen; Joni Pitkänen; Jarkko Ruutu; Tuomo Ruutu; Sami Salo; Teemu Selänne; Kimmo Timonen
Women's team	Canada; Meghan Agosta; Gillian Apps; Tessa Bonhomme; Jennifer Botterill; Jayna Hefford; Haley Irwin; Rebecca Johnston; Becky Kellar; Gina Kingsbury; Charline Labonté; Carla MacLeod; Meaghan Mikkelson; Caroline Ouellette; Cherie Piper; Marie-Philip Poulin; Kim St-Pierre; Colleen Sostorics; Shannon Szabados; Sarah Vaillancourt; Catherine Ward; Hayley Wickenheiser	United States; Kacey Bellamy; Caitlin Cahow; Lisa Chesson; Julie Chu; Natalie Darwitz; Meghan Duggan; Molly Engstrom; Hilary Knight; Jocelyne Lamoureux; Monique Lamoureux; Erika Lawler; Gigi Marvin; Brianne McLaughlin; Jenny Schmidgall-Potter; Angela Ruggiero; Molly Schaus; Kelli Stack; Karen Thatcher; Jessie Vetter; Kerry Weiland; Jinelle Zaugg-Siergiej	Finland; Anne Helin; Jenni Hiirikoski; Venla Hovi; Michelle Karvinen; Mira Kuisma; Emma Laaksonen; Rosa Lindstedt; Terhi Mertanen; Heidi Pelttari; Mariia Posa; Annina Rajahuhta; Karoliina Rantamäki; Noora Räty; Mari Saarinen; Saija Sirviö; Nina Tikkinen; Minnamari Tuominen; Saara Tuominen; Linda Välimäki; Anna Vanhatalo; Marjo Voutilainen

== Luge ==
Event	Gold	Silver	Bronze
Men's singles	Felix Loch; Germany	David Möller; Germany	Armin Zöggeler; Italy
Women's singles	Tatjana Hüfner; Germany	Nina Reithmayer; Austria	Natalie Geisenberger; Germany
Doubles	Austria; Andreas Linger; Wolfgang Linger	Latvia; Andris Šics; Juris Šics	Germany; Patric Leitner; Alexander Resch

== Nordic combined ==
Event	Gold	Silver	Bronze
Men's individual LH/10 km	Bill Demong; United States	Johnny Spillane; United States	Bernhard Gruber; Austria
Men's individual NH/10 km	Jason Lamy-Chappuis; France	Johnny Spillane; United States	Alessandro Pittin; Italy
Men's team LH/4 x 5 km	Austria; Bernhard Gruber; David Kreiner; Felix Gottwald; Mario Stecher	United States; Brett Camerota; Todd Lodwick; Johnny Spillane; Bill Demong	Germany; Johannes Rydzek; Tino Edelmann; Eric Frenzel; Björn Kircheisen

== Short track speed skating ==
Event	Gold	Silver	Bronze
Men's 500 m	Charles Hamelin; Canada	Sung Si-Bak; South Korea	François-Louis Tremblay; Canada
Men's 1000 m	Lee Jung-Su; South Korea	Lee Ho-Suk; South Korea	Apolo Anton Ohno; United States
Men's 1500 m	Lee Jung-Su; South Korea	Apolo Anton Ohno; United States	J. R. Celski; United States
Men's 5000 m relay	Canada; Charles Hamelin; François Hamelin; Olivier Jean; François-Louis Tremblay; Guillaume Bastille	South Korea; Kwak Yoon-Gy; Lee Ho-Suk; Lee Jung-Su; Sung Si-Bak; Kim Seoung-Il	United States; J. R. Celski; Travis Jayner; Jordan Malone; Apolo Anton Ohno; Simon Cho
Women's 500 m	Wang Meng; China	Marianne St-Gelais; Canada	Arianna Fontana; Italy
Women's 1000 m	Wang Meng; China	Katherine Reutter; United States	Park Seung-Hi; South Korea
Women's 1500 m	Zhou Yang; China	Lee Eun-Byul; South Korea	Park Seung-Hi; South Korea
Women's 3000 m relay	China; Sun Linlin; Wang Meng; Zhang Hui; Zhou Yang	Canada; Jessica Gregg; Kalyna Roberge; Marianne St-Gelais; Tania Vicent	United States; Allison Baver; Alyson Dudek; Lana Gehring; Katherine Reutter; Kimberly Derrick

== Skeleton ==
Event	Gold	Silver	Bronze
Men's	Jon Montgomery; Canada	Martins Dukurs; Latvia	Aleksandr Tretyakov; Russia
Women's	Amy Williams; Great Britain	Kerstin Szymkowiak; Germany	Anja Huber; Germany

== Ski jumping ==
Event	Gold	Silver	Bronze
Men's normal hill individual	Simon Ammann; Switzerland	Adam Małysz; Poland	Gregor Schlierenzauer; Austria
Men's large hill individual	Simon Ammann; Switzerland	Adam Małysz; Poland	Gregor Schlierenzauer; Austria
Men's large hill team	Austria; Wolfgang Loitzl; Andreas Kofler; Thomas Morgenstern; Gregor Schlierenzauer	Germany; Michael Neumayer; Andreas Wank; Martin Schmitt; Michael Uhrmann	Norway; Anders Bardal; Tom Hilde; Johan Remen Evensen; Anders Jacobsen

== Snowboarding ==
Event	Gold	Silver	Bronze
Men's Halfpipe	Shaun White; United States	Peetu Piiroinen; Finland	Scotty Lago; United States
Men's parallel giant slalom	Jasey-Jay Anderson; Canada	Benjamin Karl; Austria	Mathieu Bozzetto; France
Men's snowboard cross	Seth Wescott; United States	Mike Robertson; Canada	Tony Ramoin; France
Women's Halfpipe	Torah Bright; Australia	Hannah Teter; United States	Kelly Clark; United States
Women's parallel giant slalom	Nicolien Sauerbreij; Netherlands	Ekaterina Ilyukhina; Russia	Marion Kreiner; Austria
Women's snowboard cross	Maëlle Ricker; Canada	Déborah Anthonioz; France	Olivia Nobs; Switzerland

== Speed skating ==
Event	Gold	Silver	Bronze
Men's 500 m	Mo Tae-bum; South Korea	Keiichiro Nagashima; Japan	Joji Kato; Japan
Men's 1000 m	Shani Davis; United States	Mo Tae-bum; South Korea	Chad Hedrick; United States
Men's 1500 m	Mark Tuitert; Netherlands	Shani Davis; United States	Håvard Bøkko; Norway
Men's 5000 m	Sven Kramer; Netherlands	Lee Seung-hoon; South Korea	Ivan Skobrev; Russia
Men's 10000 m	Lee Seung-hoon; South Korea	Ivan Skobrev; Russia	Bob de Jong; Netherlands
Men's team pursuit	Canada; Mathieu Giroux; Lucas Makowsky; Denny Morrison	United States; Brian Hansen; Chad Hedrick; Jonathan Kuck; Trevor Marsicano	Netherlands; Jan Blokhuijsen; Sven Kramer; Simon Kuipers; Mark Tuitert
Women's 500 m	Lee Sang-hwa; South Korea	Jenny Wolf; Germany	Wang Beixing; China
Women's 1000 m	Christine Nesbitt; Canada	Annette Gerritsen; Netherlands	Laurine van Riessen; Netherlands
Women's 1500 m	Ireen Wüst; Netherlands	Kristina Groves; Canada	Martina Sáblíková; Czech Republic
Women's 3000 m	Martina Sáblíková; Czech Republic	Stephanie Beckert; Germany	Kristina Groves; Canada
Women's 5000 m	Martina Sáblíková; Czech Republic	Stephanie Beckert; Germany	Clara Hughes; Canada
Women's team pursuit	Germany; Daniela Anschütz-Thoms; Stephanie Beckert; Anni Friesinger-Postma; Katrin Mattscherodt	Japan; Masako Hozumi; Nao Kodaira; Maki Tabata	Poland; Katarzyna Bachleda-Curuś; Katarzyna Woźniak; Luiza Złotkowska

== Medal leaders ==
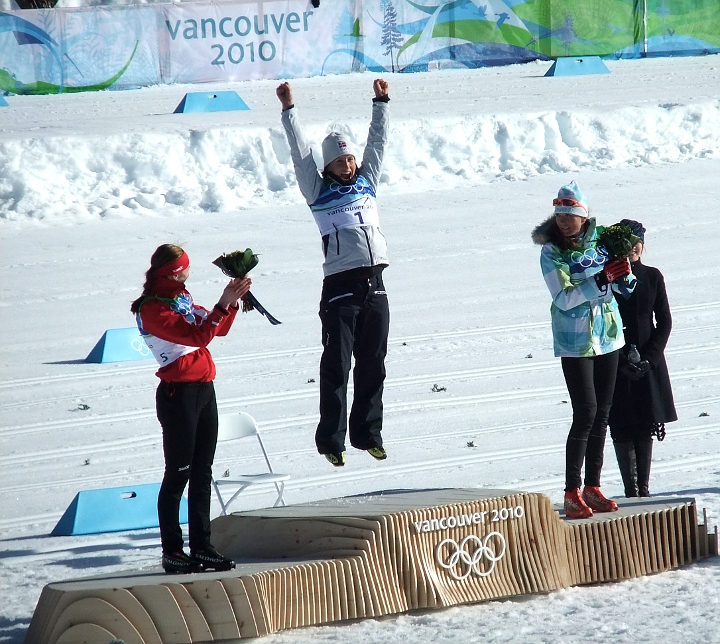
The medal winners in the women's sprint in cross-country skiing, from left to right: Justyna Kowalczyk (left) Marit Bjørgen (center) and Petra Majdič (right).

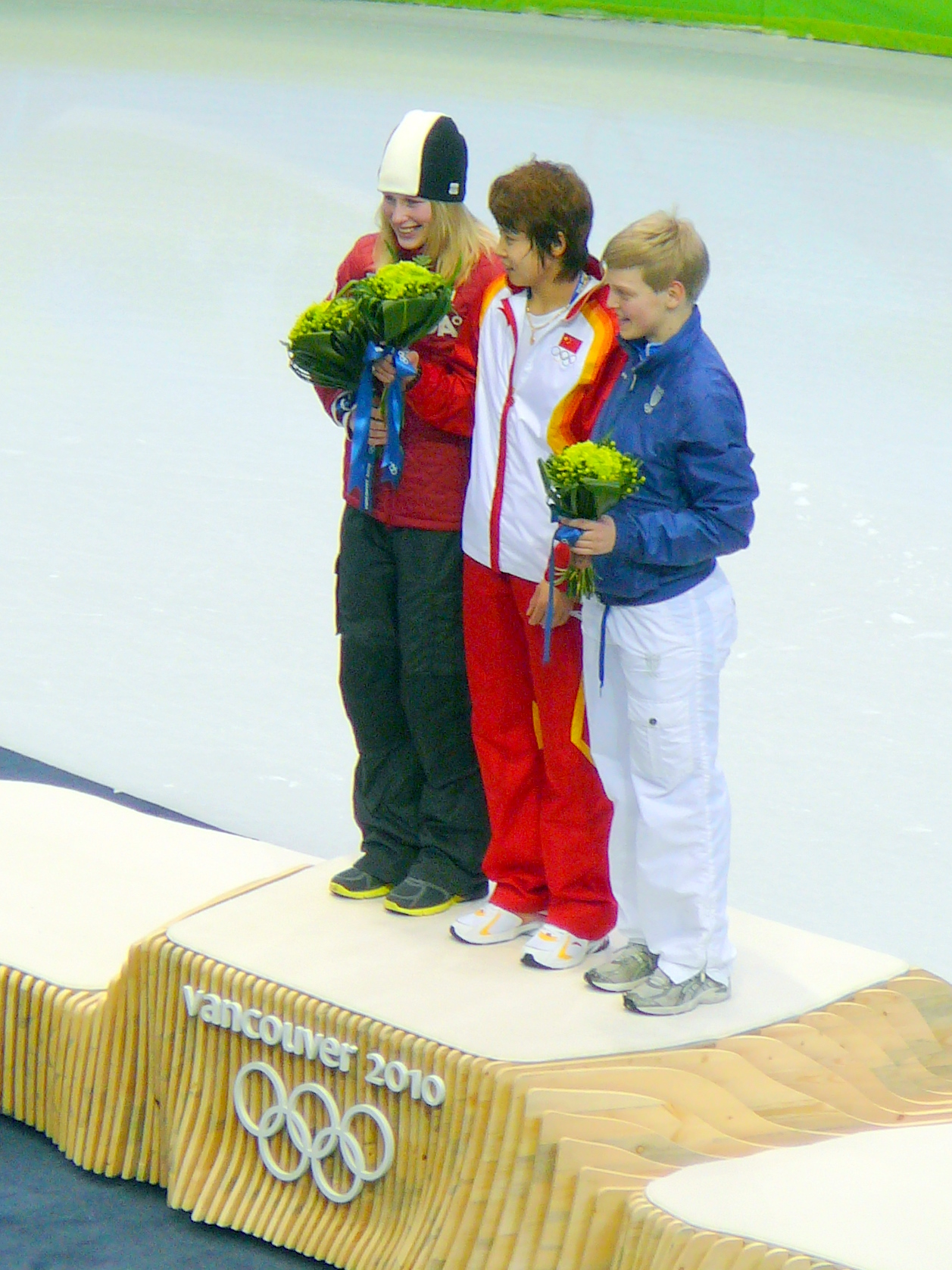
The medal winners in the women's 500 metres in short track speed skating, from left to right: Marianne St-Gelais (left) Wang Meng (center) and Arianna Fontana (right).

Athletes that won at least two gold medals or at least three total medals are listed below.

Athlete	Nation	Sport	Gold	Silver	Bronze	Total
Marit Bjørgen	Norway	Cross-country skiing	3	1	1	5
Wang Meng	China	Short track speed skating	3	0	0	3
Petter Northug	Norway	Cross-country skiing	2	1	1	4
Lee Jung-Su	South Korea	Short track speed skating	2	1	0	3
Magdalena Neuner	Germany	Biathlon	2	1	0	3
Emil Hegle Svendsen	Norway	Biathlon	2	1	0	3
Martina Sáblíková	Czech Republic	Speed skating	2	0	1	3
Simon Ammann	Switzerland	Ski jumping	2	0	0	2
Charles Hamelin	Canada	Short track speed skating	2	0	0	2
Marcus Hellner	Sweden	Cross-country skiing	2	0	0	2
Maria Riesch	Germany	Alpine skiing	2	0	0	2
Zhou Yang	China	Short track speed skating	2	0	0	2
Stephanie Beckert	Germany	Speed skating	1	2	0	3
Justyna Kowalczyk	Poland	Cross-country skiing	1	1	1	3
Bode Miller	United States	Alpine skiing	1	1	1	3
Aksel Lund Svindal	Norway	Alpine skiing	1	1	1	3
Johan Olsson	Sweden	Cross-country skiing	1	0	2	3
Gregor Schlierenzauer	Austria	Ski jumping	1	0	2	3
Johnny Spillane	United States	Nordic combined	0	3	0	3
Apolo Anton Ohno	United States	Short track speed skating	0	1	2	3

== See also ==
- 2010 Winter Olympics medal table
- List of 2010 Winter Paralympics medal winners
