= Speed skating at the 2010 Winter Olympics – Men's team pursuit =

Speed skating at the Olympics

Men's team pursuit at the XXI Olympic Winter Games
- Venue: Richmond Olympic Oval
- Dates: 26–27 February 2010

Medalists
1st place, gold medalist(s)		Mathieu Giroux; Lucas Makowsky; Denny Morrison	Canada
2nd place, silver medalist(s)		Brian Hansen; Chad Hedrick; Jonathan Kuck; Trevor Marsicano	United States
3rd place, bronze medalist(s)		Jan Blokhuijsen; Sven Kramer; Mark Tuitert; Simon Kuipers	Netherlands

The men's team pursuit speed skating competition of the Vancouver 2010 Olympics was held at Richmond Olympic Oval on 26 and 27 February 2010.

== Records ==
Prior to this competition, the existing world and Olympic records were as follows.

World record	Netherlands	3:37.80	Salt Lake City, United States	11 March 2007
Olympic record	Italy	3:43.64	Turin, Italy	15 February 2006

The following new records were set during this competition.

Date	Round	Athletes	Country	Time	Record
26 February	Quarterfinal 1	Mathieu Giroux; Lucas Makowsky; Denny Morrison	Canada	3:42.38	OR, TR
26 February	Semifinal 1	Mathieu Giroux; Lucas Makowsky; Denny Morrison	Canada	3:42.22	OR, TR
27 February	Final B	Jan Blokhuijsen; Sven Kramer; Simon Kuipers	Netherlands	3:39.95	OR, TR

OR = Olympic record, TR = track record

== Results ==
=== Bracket ===
Quarterfinal
1	Netherlands	3:44.25
7	Sweden	3:46.40
6	Japan	3:48.15
4	United States	3:44.25
3	Canada	3:42.38
5	Italy	3:46.35
8	South Korea	3:43.69
2	Norway	3:43.66

Semifinal
1	Netherlands	3:43.11
4	United States	3:42.71
3	Canada	3:42.22
2	Norway	3:43.44

Final
4	United States	3:41.58
3	Canada	3:41.37
Third place
1	Netherlands	3:39.95
2	Norway	3:40.50

=== Quarterfinals ===
Rank	Country	Name	Time	Deficit	Notes
Quarterfinal 1
1	Canada	Mathieu Giroux; Lucas Makowsky; Denny Morrison	3:42.38		Semifinal 1, OR
2	Italy	Matteo Anesi; Enrico Fabris; Luca Stefani	3:46.35	+3.97	Final C
Quarterfinal 2
1	United States	Chad Hedrick; Jonathan Kuck; Trevor Marsicano	3:44.25		Semifinal 2
2	Japan	Shigeyuki Dejima; Hiroki Hirako; Teruhiro Sugimori	3:48.15	+3.90	Final D
Quarterfinal 3
1	Norway	Håvard Bøkko; Mikael Flygind Larsen; Fredrik van der Horst	3:43.66		Semifinal 1
2	South Korea	Ha Hong-sun; Lee Jong-woo; Lee Seung-hoon	3:43.69	+0.03	Final C
Quarterfinal 4
1	Netherlands	Jan Blokhuijsen; Sven Kramer; Simon Kuipers	3:44.25		Semifinal 2
2	Sweden	Joel Eriksson; Daniel Friberg; Johan Röjler	3:46.40	+2.15	Final D

=== Semifinals ===
Rank	Country	Name	Time	Deficit	Notes
Semifinal 1
1	Canada	Mathieu Giroux; Lucas Makowsky; Denny Morrison	3:42.22		Final A, OR
2	Norway	Håvard Bøkko; Henrik Christiansen; Fredrik van der Horst	3:43.44	+1.22	Final B
Semifinal 2
1	United States	Brian Hansen; Chad Hedrick; Jonathan Kuck	3:42.71		Final A
2	Netherlands	Jan Blokhuijsen; Sven Kramer; Mark Tuitert	3:43.11	+0.40	Final B

=== Finals ===
Rank	Country	Name	Time	Deficit	Notes
Final A
1st place, gold medalist(s)	Canada	Mathieu Giroux; Lucas Makowsky; Denny Morrison	3:41.37		
2nd place, silver medalist(s)	United States	Brian Hansen; Chad Hedrick; Jonathan Kuck	3:41.58	+0.21	
Final B
3rd place, bronze medalist(s)	Netherlands	Jan Blokhuijsen; Sven Kramer; Mark Tuitert	3:39.95		OR
4	Norway	Håvard Bøkko; Henrik Christiansen; Mikael Flygind Larsen	3:40.50	+0.55	
Final C
5	South Korea	Ha Hong-sun; Lee Jong-woo; Lee Seung-hoon	3:48.60		
6	Italy	Matteo Anesi; Enrico Fabris; Luca Stefani	3:54.39	+5.79	
Final D
7	Sweden	Joel Eriksson; Daniel Friberg; Johan Röjler	3:46.18		
8	Japan	Shigeyuki Dejima; Hiroki Hirako; Teruhiro Sugimori	3:49.11	+2.93	
