= Speed skating at the 2010 Winter Olympics – Men's 1500 metres =

Speed skating at the Olympics

Men's 1500 metres at the XXI Olympic Winter Games
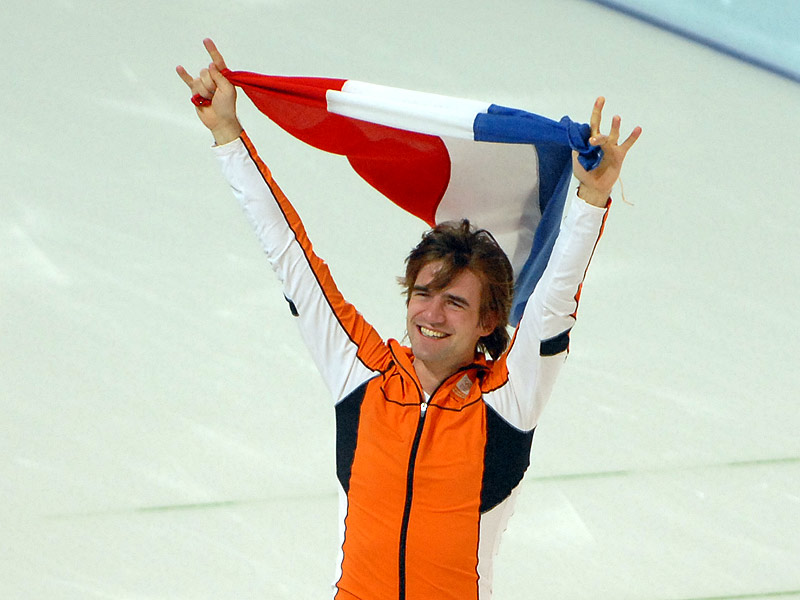
- Gold medal winner Mark Tuitert
- Venue: Richmond Olympic Oval
- Date: 20 February 2010
- Competitors: 37 from 14 nations
- Winning time: 1:45.57

Medalists
1st place, gold medalist(s)		Mark Tuitert	Netherlands
2nd place, silver medalist(s)		Shani Davis	United States
3rd place, bronze medalist(s)		Håvard Bøkko	Norway

The men's 1500 metres speed skating competition of the 2010 Winter Olympics in Vancouver was held at the Richmond Olympic Oval on 20 February 2010.

== Records ==
Prior to this competition, the existing world and Olympic records were as follows.

World record	Shani Davis (USA)	1:41.04	Salt Lake City, United States	11 December 2009
Olympic record	Derek Parra (USA)	1:43.95	Salt Lake City, United States	19 February 2002

No new world or Olympic records were set during this competition.

== Results ==
Rank	Pair	Lane	Name	Country	Time	Time behind	Notes
1st place, gold medalist(s)	17	o	Mark Tuitert	Netherlands	1:45.57	0.00	
2nd place, silver medalist(s)	19	i	Shani Davis	United States	1:46.10	+0.53	
3rd place, bronze medalist(s)	17	i	Håvard Bøkko	Norway	1:46.13	+0.56	
4	16	i	Ivan Skobrev	Russia	1:46.42	+0.85	
5	14	o	Mo Tae-bum	South Korea	1:46.47	+0.90	
6	18	o	Chad Hedrick	United States	1:46.69	+1.12	
7	10	o	Simon Kuipers	Netherlands	1:46.76	+1.19	
8	12	o	Mikael Flygind Larsen	Norway	1:46.77	+1.20	
9	16	o	Denny Morrison	Canada	1:46.93	+1.36	
10	15	i	Enrico Fabris	Italy	1:47.02	+1.45	
11	13	i	Yevgeny Lalenkov	Russia	1:47.06	+1.49	
12	13	o	Matteo Anesi	Italy	1:47.34	+1.77	
13	8	o	Sven Kramer	Netherlands	1:47.40	+1.83	
14	15	o	Mathieu Giroux	Canada	1:47.62	+2.05	
15	14	i	Trevor Marsicano	United States	1:47.84	+2.27	
16	18	i	Stefan Groothuis	Netherlands	1:48.03	+2.46	
17	12	i	Konrad Niedźwiedzki	Poland	1:48.15	+2.58	
18	9	i	Brian Hansen	United States	1:48.45	+2.88	
19	19	o	Lucas Makowsky	Canada	1:48.61	+3.04	
20	7	o	Christoffer Fagerli Rukke	Norway	1:48.62	+3.05	
21	8	i	Aleksey Yesin	Russia	1:48.65	+3.08	
22	4	o	Lee Jong-woo	South Korea	1:49.00	+3.43	
23	11	o	Denis Kuzin	Kazakhstan	1:49.05	+3.48	
24	9	o	Joel Eriksson	Sweden	1:49.08	+3.51	
25	2	i	Daniel Friberg	Sweden	1:49.13	+3.56	
26	10	i	Teruhiro Sugimori	Japan	1:49.19	+3.62	
27	11	i	Zbigniew Bródka	Poland	1:49.45	+3.88	
28	7	i	Johan Röjler	Sweden	1:49.50	+3.93	
29	3	o	Fredrik van der Horst	Norway	1:49.58	+4.01	
30	6	o	Shingo Doi	Japan	1:49.77	+4.20	
31	2	o	Ha Hong-seon	South Korea	1:49.93	+4.36	
32	3	i	Samuel Schwarz	Germany	1:50.07	+4.50	
33	4	i	Pascal Briand	France	1:50.71	+5.14	
34	6	i	Gao Xuefeng	China	1:50.78	+5.21	
35	5	o	Sun Longjiang	China	1:51.30	+5.73	
36	1	i	Aleksandr Lebedev	Russia	1:52.09	+6.52	
37	5	i	Kyle Parrott	Canada	1:52.67	+7.10	
