= Speed skating at the 2010 Winter Olympics – Men's 5000 metres =

Speed skating at the Olympics

Men's 5000 metres at the XXI Olympic Winter Games
- Venue: Richmond Olympic Oval
- Date: 13 February 2010
- Competitors: 28 from 16 nations
- Winning time: 6:14.60 OR

Medalists
1st place, gold medalist(s)		Sven Kramer; Netherlands
2nd place, silver medalist(s)		Lee Seung-hoon; South Korea
3rd place, bronze medalist(s)		Ivan Skobrev; Russia

The men's 5000 metres speed skating competition of the 2010 Winter Olympics in Vancouver was held at the Richmond Olympic Oval on 13 February 2010.

== Records ==
Prior to this competition, the existing world and Olympic records were as follows.

World record	Sven Kramer (NED)	6:03.32	Calgary, Canada	17 November 2007
Olympic record	Jochem Uytdehaage (NED)	6:14.66	Salt Lake City, United States	9 February 2002

The following new Olympic record was set during this competition.

Date	Round	Athlete	Country	Time	Record
13 February	Pair 11	Sven Kramer	Netherlands	6:14.60	OR

OR = Olympic record

== Results ==
Rank	Pair	Lane	Name	Country	Time	Time behind	Notes
1st place, gold medalist(s)	11	i	Sven Kramer	Netherlands	6:14.60		OR
2nd place, silver medalist(s)	12	i	Lee Seung-hoon	South Korea	6:16.95	+2.35	
3rd place, bronze medalist(s)	13	i	Ivan Skobrev	Russia	6:18.05	+3.45	
4	14	i	Håvard Bøkko	Norway	6:18.80	+4.20	
5	12	o	Bob de Jong	Netherlands	6:19.02	+4.42	
6	10	i	Alexis Contin	France	6:19.58	+4.98	
7	13	o	Enrico Fabris	Italy	6:20.53	+5.93	
8	10	o	Henrik Christiansen	Norway	6:24.80	+10.20	
9	7	o	Jan Blokhuijsen	Netherlands	6:26.30	+11.70	
10	6	i	Sverre Haugli	Norway	6:27.05	+12.45	
11	14	o	Chad Hedrick	United States	6:27.07	+12.47	
12	11	o	Shani Davis	United States	6:28.44	+13.84	
13	8	i	Lucas Makowsky	Canada	6:28.71	+14.11	
14	2	o	Trevor Marsicano	United States	6:30.93	+16.33	
15	6	o	Dmitry Babenko	Kazakhstan	6:31.19	+16.59	
16	3	i	Sławomir Chmura	Poland	6:33.20	+18.60	
17	8	o	Shane Dobbin	New Zealand	6:33.39	+18.78	
18	2	i	Denny Morrison	Canada	6:33.78	+19.17	
19	9	i	Hiroki Hirako	Japan	6:33.90	+19.30	
20	5	o	Haralds Silovs	Latvia	6:35.69	+21.09	
21	7	i	Johan Röjler	Sweden	6:35.88	+21.28	
22	4	i	Patrick Beckert	Germany	6:36.02	+21.42	
23	9	o	Marco Weber	Germany	6:36.45	+21.85	
24	1	o	Roger Schneider	Switzerland	6:39.30	+24.69	
25	4	o	Luca Stefani	Italy	6:41.75	+27.15	
26	1	i	Robert Lehmann	Germany	6:43.77	+29.17	
27	5	i	Shigeyuki Dejima	Japan	6:43.82	+29.22	
	3	o	Aleksandr Rumyantsev	Russia	(6:35.43)	–	DSQ
