= South Korea at the 2010 Winter Olympics =

- IOC code: KOR
- NOC: Korean Olympic Committee
- Website: www.sports.or.kr (in Korean and English)

in Vancouver
- Competitors: 46 in 12 sports
- Flag bearer (opening): Kang Kwang-bae
- Flag bearer (closing): Mo Tae-bum
- Medals Ranked 5th: Gold 6 Silver 6 Bronze 2 Total 14

Winter Olympics appearances (overview)
- 1948; 1952; 1956; 1960; 1964; 1968; 1972; 1976; 1980; 1984; 1988; 1992; 1994; 1998; 2002; 2006; 2010; 2014; 2018; 2022; 2026

Other related appearances
- Korea (2018)

South Korea participated as the Republic of Korea at the 2010 Winter Olympics in Vancouver, British Columbia, Canada. This was their best performance at the Winter Olympics to date, ranking 5th in gold medals and 7th in overall medals.

Korea won its first-ever medal in figure skating when Kim Yuna won gold and set a world record in the ladies' event.

== Medalists ==
Medal	Name	Sport	Event	Date
Gold	Lee Jung-su	Short track	Men's 1500 metres	13 Feb
Gold	Lee Jung-su	Short track	Men's 1000 metres	20 Feb
Gold	Mo Tae-bum	Speed skating	Men's 500 metres	15 Feb
Gold	Lee Sang-hwa	Speed skating	Women's 500 metres	16 Feb
Gold	Lee Seung-hoon	Speed skating	Men's 10000 metres	23 Feb
Gold	Kim Yuna	Figure skating	Ladies' singles	25 Feb
Silver	Lee Eun-byul	Short track	Women's 1500 metres	20 Feb
Silver	Lee Ho-suk	Short track	Men's 1000 metres	20 Feb
Silver	Lee Seung-hoon	Speed skating	Men's 5000 metres	13 Feb
Silver	Mo Tae-bum	Speed skating	Men's 1000 metres	17 Feb
Silver	Sung Si-bak	Short track	Men's 500 metres	26 Feb
Silver	Kwak Yoon-gy; Lee Ho-suk; Lee Jung-su; Sung Si-bak; Kim Seoung-il	Short track	Men's 5000 metre relay	26 Feb
Bronze	Park Seung-hi	Short track	Women's 1500 metres	20 Feb
Bronze	Park Seung-hi	Short track	Women's 1000 metres	26 Feb

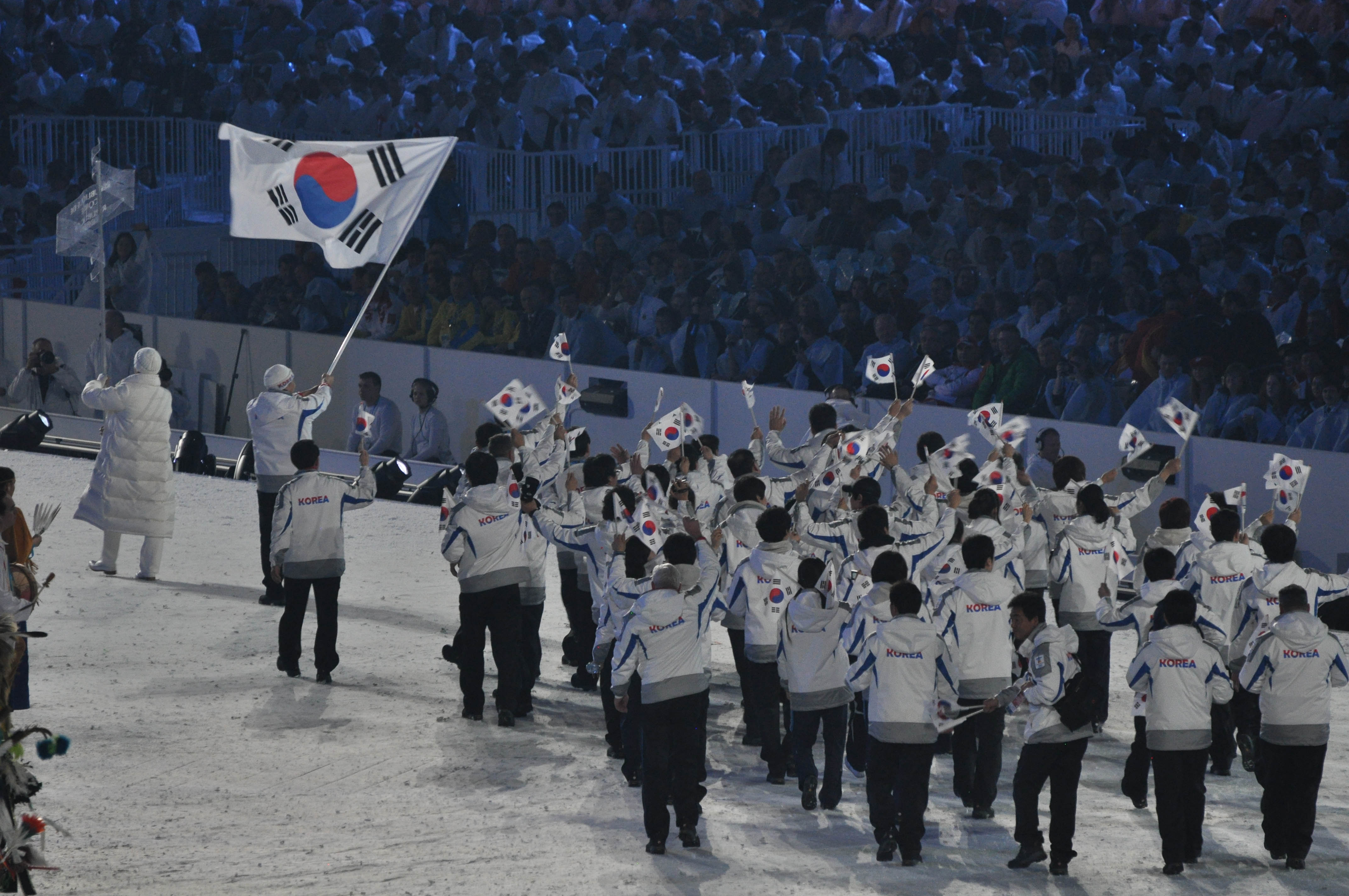
South Korea at the 2010 opening ceremony.

Medals by sport
Sport	Gold medal	Silver medal	Bronze medal	Total
Short track speed skating	2	4	2	8
Speed skating	3	2	0	5
Figure skating	1	0	0	1
Total	6	6	2	14

Medals by date						Cumulative			
Day	Date	Gold medal	Silver medal	Bronze medal	Total	Gold medal	Silver medal	Bronze medal	Total
Day 1	13th	1	1	0	2	1	1	0	2
Day 2	14th	0	0	0	0	1	1	0	2
Day 3	15th	1	0	0	1	2	1	0	3
Day 4	16th	1	0	0	1	3	1	0	4
Day 5	17th	0	1	0	1	3	2	0	5
Day 6	18th	0	0	0	0	3	2	0	5
Day 7	19th	0	0	0	0	3	2	0	5
Day 8	20th	1	2	1	4	4	4	1	9
Day 9	21st	0	0	0	0	4	4	1	9
Day 10	22nd	0	0	0	0	4	4	1	9
Day 11	23rd	1	0	0	1	5	4	1	10
Day 13	25th	1	0	0	1	6	4	1	11
Day 14	26th	0	2	1	3	6	6	2	14
Total		6	6	2	14	6	6	2	14

== Alpine skiing ==
Athlete	Date of birth	Event	Run 1		Run 2		Total	
Athlete	Date of birth	Event	Time	Rank	Time	Rank	Time	Rank
Jung Dong-hyun	1 June 1988	Men's slalom	DNF					
Kim Woo-sung	2 April 1986	Men's slalom	DNF					
Kim Woo-sung	2 April 1986	Men's giant slalom	DSQ					
Kim Sun-joo	13 November 1985	Women's slalom	1:23.88	53	1:20.70	49	2:44.58	49
Kim Sun-joo	13 November 1985	Women's giant slalom	1:23.88	53	1:20.70	49	2:44.58	49

== Biathlon ==
Athlete	Date of birth	Event	Final		
Athlete	Date of birth	Event	Time	Penalties	Rank
Lee In-bok	30 March 1984	Men's sprint	27:34.1	1+3	65
Lee In-bok	30 March 1984	Men's individual	56:24.5	2+0+0+2	71
Mun Ji-hee	2 August 1988	Women's sprint	22:34.1	1+1	63
Mun Ji-hee	2 August 1988	Women's individual	48:53.9	0+0+2+3	73

== Bobsleigh ==
Athlete	Date of birth	Event	Final					
Athlete	Date of birth	Event	Run 1	Run 2	Run 3	Run 4	Total	Rank
Kang Kwang-bae; Lee Jin-hee; Kim Jung-su; Kim Dong-hyun	29 July 1973; 7 July 1981; 20 April 1984; 12 November 1987	Four-man	52.76	52.53	52.92	53.15	53.11	19

== Cross-country skiing ==
Athlete	Date of birth	Event	Final	
Athlete	Date of birth	Event	Time	Rank
Lee Jun-gil	18 September 1985	Men's 15 km freestyle	39:51.6	79
Lee Chae-won	7 April 1981	Women's 10 km freestyle	27:56.0	54
Lee Chae-won	7 April 1981	Women's 15 kilometre pursuit	47:34.6	59

== Figure skating ==
South Korea qualified 2 entrants in ladies singles, for a total of 2 athletes. Kim Yuna's gold medal at the ladies' event is the South Korea's first medal at the Winter Olympics in an event other than short track and speed skating.

Athlete(s)	Date of birth	Event	CD		SP/OD		FS/FD		Total	
Athlete(s)	Date of birth	Event	Points	Rank	Points	Rank	Points	Rank	Points	Rank
Kim Yuna	5 September 1990	Ladies'			78.50 OR WR	1	150.06 OR WR	1	228.56 OR WR	1st place, gold medalist(s)
Kwak Min-jeong	23 January 1994	Ladies'			53.16	16	102.37	12	155.53	13

== Freestyle skiing ==
Athlete	Date of birth	Event	Qualifying		Final	
Athlete	Date of birth	Event	Points	Rank	Points	Rank
Seo Jung-hwa	27 September 1990	Women's moguls	20.88	21	DNQ	21

== Luge ==
Athlete	Event	Final					
Athlete	Event	Run 1	Run 2	Run 3	Run 4	Total	Rank
Lee Yong	Men's singles	50.549	50.607	51.012	51.128	3:23.296	36

== Short track speed skating ==
Men

Athlete	Date of birth	Event	Heat		Quarterfinal		Semifinal		Final	
Athlete	Date of birth	Event	Time	Rank	Time	Rank	Time	Rank	Time	Rank
Lee Ho-suk	25 June 1986	500m	41.632	1 Q	41.269	1 Q	1:24.514	4 QB	49.149	7
Lee Ho-suk	25 June 1986	1000m	1:25.925	1 Q	1:24.980	1 Q	1:25.347	1 Q	1:23.801	2nd place, silver medalist(s)
Lee Ho-suk	25 June 1986	1500m	2:14.324	2 Q	n/a		2:14.833	1 Q	DSQ	
Sung Si-bak	18 February 1987	500m	41.889	1 Q	40.821	2 Q	41.126	2 Q	41.340	2nd place, silver medalist(s)
Sung Si-bak	18 February 1987	1000m	1:24.245 OR	1 Q	1:24.570	1 Q	1:25.068	3 QB	DSQ	
Sung Si-bak	18 February 1987	1500m	2:14.836	1 Q	n/a		2:13.585	1 Q	2:45.010	5
Kwak Yoon-gy	26 December 1989	500m	42.147	1 Q	41.761	2 Q	41.620	3 QB	42.123	4
Lee Jung-su	30 November 1989	1000m	1:24.962	1 Q	1:25.822	1 Q	1:25.560	2 Q	1:23.747 OR	1st place, gold medalist(s)
Lee Jung-su	30 November 1989	1500m	2:12.380 OR	1 Q	n/a		2:10.949 OR	1 Q	2:17.611	1st place, gold medalist(s)
Lee Ho-suk; Sung Si-bak; Lee Jung-su; Kwak Yoon-gy; Kim Seoung-il	25 June 1986; 18 February 1987; 30 November 1989; 26 December 1989; 19 December 1990	5000m relay	n/a				6:43.845	1 Q	6:44.446	2nd place, silver medalist(s)

Women

Athlete	Date of birth	Event	Heat		Quarterfinal		Semifinal		Final	
Athlete	Date of birth	Event	Time	Rank	Time	Rank	Time	Rank	Time	Rank
Cho Ha-ri	29 July 1986	500m	44.313	2 Q	44.306	3	Did not qualify			10
Cho Ha-ri	29 July 1986	1000m	1:35.953	1 Q	1:30.543	2 Q	1:30.792	4 QB	1:31.932	4
Cho Ha-ri	29 July 1986	1500m	2:22.928	1 Q	n/a		2:35.492	3 ADV	2:18.831	5
Park Seung-hi	28 March 1992	500m	44.221	1 Q	DSQ		Did not qualify			15
Park Seung-hi	28 March 1992	1000m	1:31.885	1 Q	1:30.769	1 Q	1:29.165	2 Q	1:29.379	3rd place, bronze medalist(s)
Park Seung-hi	28 March 1992	1500m	2:24.129	1 Q	n/a		2:20.859	1 Q	2:17.927	3rd place, bronze medalist(s)
Lee Eun-byul	2 October 1991	500m	44.000	1 Q	44.582	2 Q	44.899	4 QB	44.860	8
Lee Eun-byul	2 October 1991	1500m	2:27.286	1 Q	n/a		2:24.318	1 Q	2:17.849	2nd place, silver medalist(s)
Cho Ha-ri; Park Seung-hi; Lee Eun-byul; Kim Min-jung; Choi Jung-won	29 July 1986; 28 March 1992; 2 October 1991; 20 March 1985; 16 March 1990	3000m relay	n/a				4:10.753	1 Q	DSQ	

== Skeleton ==
Athlete	Date of birth	Event	Final					
Athlete	Date of birth	Event	Run 1	Run 2	Run 3	Run 4	Total	Rank
Cho In-ho	24 June 1978	Men's singles	54.46	54.42	54.28	DNQ	2:43.16	22

== Ski jumping ==
Athlete	Date of birth	Event	Qualifying		First round		Final		
Athlete	Date of birth	Event	Points	Rank	Points	Rank	Points	Total	Rank
Choi Heung-chul	3 December 1981	Normal hill	108.5	40 Q	95.0	48	DNQ	95.0	48
Choi Heung-chul	3 December 1981	Large hill	107.0	34 Q	56.3	49	DNQ	56.3	49
Choi Yong-jik	3 December 1982	Normal hill	107.0	43	DNQ				
Choi Yong-jik	3 December 1982	Large hill	83.4	46	DNQ				
Kim Hyun-ki	9 February 1983	Normal hill	121.5	22 Q	107.0	30	DNQ	107.0	40
Kim Hyun-ki	9 February 1983	Large hill	108.9	33 Q	78.0	42	DNQ	78.0	42

== Snowboarding ==
Athlete	Date of birth	Event	Qualifying			Semifinal			Final		
Athlete	Date of birth	Event	Run 1	Run 2	Rank	Run 1	Run 2	Rank	Run 1	Run 2	Rank
Kim Ho-jun	1 May 1990	Men's halfpipe	8.4	25.8	12	Did not qualify					

== Speed skating ==
Men

Athlete	Date of birth	Event	Race 1		Final	
Athlete	Date of birth	Event	Time	Rank	Time	Rank
Mo Tae-bum	15 February 1989	500 m	34.923	34.906	69.82	1st place, gold medalist(s)
Mo Tae-bum	15 February 1989	1000 m	n/a		1:09.12	2nd place, silver medalist(s)
Mo Tae-bum	15 February 1989	1500 m	n/a		1:46.47	5
Lee Kyou-hyuk	16 March 1978	500 m	35.145	35.344	70.48	15
Lee Kyou-hyuk	16 March 1978	1000 m	n/a		1:09.92	9
Mun Jun	14 July 1982	500 m	35.552	35.640	71.19	19
Mun Jun	14 July 1982	1000 m	n/a		1:10.68	18
Lee Kang-seok	28 February 1985	500 m	35.053	34.988	70.041	4
Lee Ki-ho	17 August 1984	1000 m	n/a		1:12.33	36
Ha Hong-sun	1 June 1991	1500 m	n/a		1:49.93	31
Lee Jong-woo	5 July 1985	1500 m	n/a		1:49.00	22
Lee Seung-hoon	6 March 1988	5000 m	n/a		6:16.95	2nd place, silver medalist(s)
Lee Seung-hoon	6 March 1988	10000 m	n/a		12:58.55 OR	1st place, gold medalist(s)

Men's team pursuit

Athlete	Date of birth	Event	Quarterfinal	Semifinal	Final	
Athlete	Date of birth	Event	Opposition time	Opposition time	Opposition time	Rank
Lee Seung-hoon; Lee Jong-woo; Ha Hong-sun	6 March 1988; 5 July 1985; 1 June 1991	Team pursuit	Norway; 3:43.69 QC	n/a	Italy; 3:48.60	5

Women

Athlete	Date of birth	Event	Race 1		Final	
Athlete	Date of birth	Event	Time	Rank	Time	Rank
Lee Sang-hwa	25 February 1989	500 m	38.249	37.850	76.09	1st place, gold medalist(s)
Lee Sang-hwa	25 February 1989	1000 m	n/a		1:18.24	23
Ahn Ji-min	29 April 1992	500 m	39.595	39.549	79.14	31
Lee Bo-ra	16 August 1986	500 m	39.396	39.406	78.80	26
Oh Min-ji	29 March 1985	500 m	39.816	39.768	79.58	32
Kim Yoo-rim	3 February 1990	1000 m	n/a		DNF	
Lee Ju-yeon	29 October 1987	1500 m	n/a		2:03.67	33
Lee Ju-yeon	29 October 1987	3000 m	n/a		4:18.87	23
Noh Seon-yeong	19 October 1989	1500 m	n/a		2:02.84	30
Noh Seon-yeong	19 October 1989	3000 m	n/a		4:17.36	19
Park Do-yeong	30 January 1993	3000 m	n/a		4:20.92	27

Women's team pursuit

Athlete	Date of birth	Event	Quarterfinal	Semifinal	Final	
Athlete	Date of birth	Event	Opposition time	Opposition time	Opposition time	Rank
Lee Ju-yeon; Noh Seon-yeong; Park Do-yeong	29 October 1987; 19 October 1989; 30 January 1993	Team pursuit	Japan; 3:07.45 QD	n/a	Russia; 3:06.96	8

== See also ==
- South Korea at the Olympics
- South Korea at the 2010 Winter Paralympics
