= Loudmouth Golf =

American sportswear company

- Industry: Sportswear
- Founded: 2010
- Founder: Scott "Woody" Woodworth
- Fate: Acquired by Alegria Holdings
- Headquarters: Sonoma County, California
- Website: loudmouth.com

Loudmouth Golf is an American sportswear company based in Sonoma County, California, known for colorful trousers.

== History ==
The company was established in 2000 by Scott "Woody" Woodworth, then a graphic designer. His first design involved a children's fabric with prints of Warner Brothers cartoon characters, which he had made by a local seamstress. The designs caught the attention of various sports personalities, who began ordering the pants. In 2007, Woodworth began creating his own fabric designs.

In October 2021, Alegria Holdings, an investment firm, acquired Loudmouth Golf.

== Recognition ==
In 2009, golfer John Daly appeared wearing "loud" clothing from the company on the European Tour while banned from the PGA Tour. Daly later entered a formal endorsement agreement with the company.

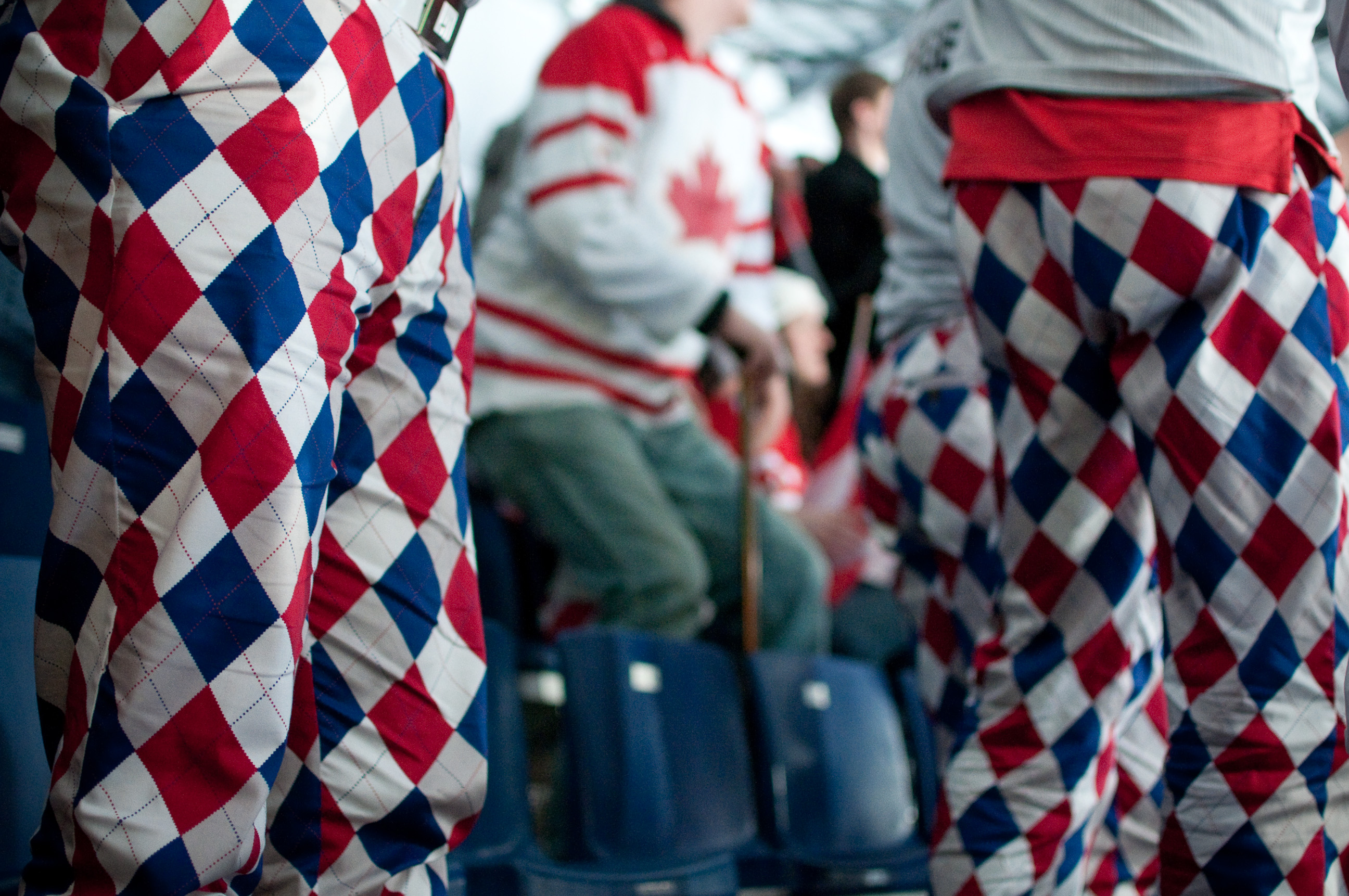
Loudmouth's Dixie-A pattern as worn by fans of Norway's curling team

The Norwegian curling team drew international attention to the company, and to themselves, at the 2010 Winter Olympics by wearing Loudmouth's "Dixie-A" pants with red, white, and blue diamonds as a uniform. The team wore the pants on advice from second Chris Svae who served as their fashion consultant. The team gave a pair to King Harald V of Norway. A Facebook fan page created for Norway's pants drew more than 500,000 fans during the games.
