= Fredrik Austbø =

Norwegian snowboarder (born 1988)

Fredrik Austbø (born 20 April 1988) is a Norwegian skateboarder and snowboarder with the specialty of half-pipe. He competed in the 2006 Winter Olympics and was once on an FIS World Cup podium. He competed for Norway at the 2010 Winter Olympics in the men's halfpipe.
