= 2010 Winter Olympics medal table =

2010 Winter Olympics medals
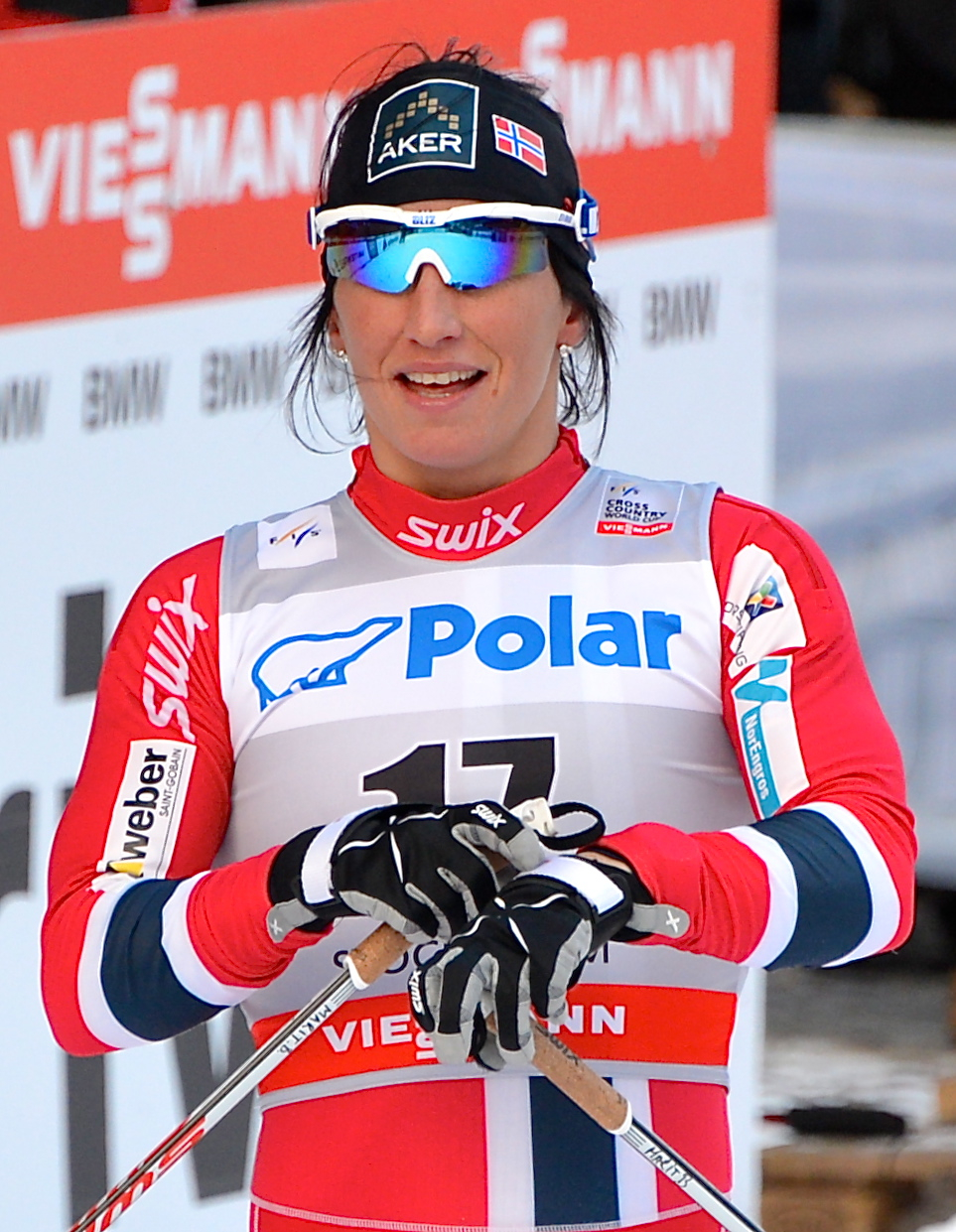
- Marit Bjørgen (pictured) won five medals at the 2010 Winter Olympics, the most of any competing athlete.
- Location: Vancouver, Canada

Highlights
- Most gold medals: Canada (14)
- Most total medals: United States (37)
- Medalling NOCs: 26

2010 Winter Olympic Games Medals map Legend: Gold represents countries that won at least one gold medal Silver represents countries that won at least one silver medal Red represents countries that did not win any medals Grey represents countries that did not participate

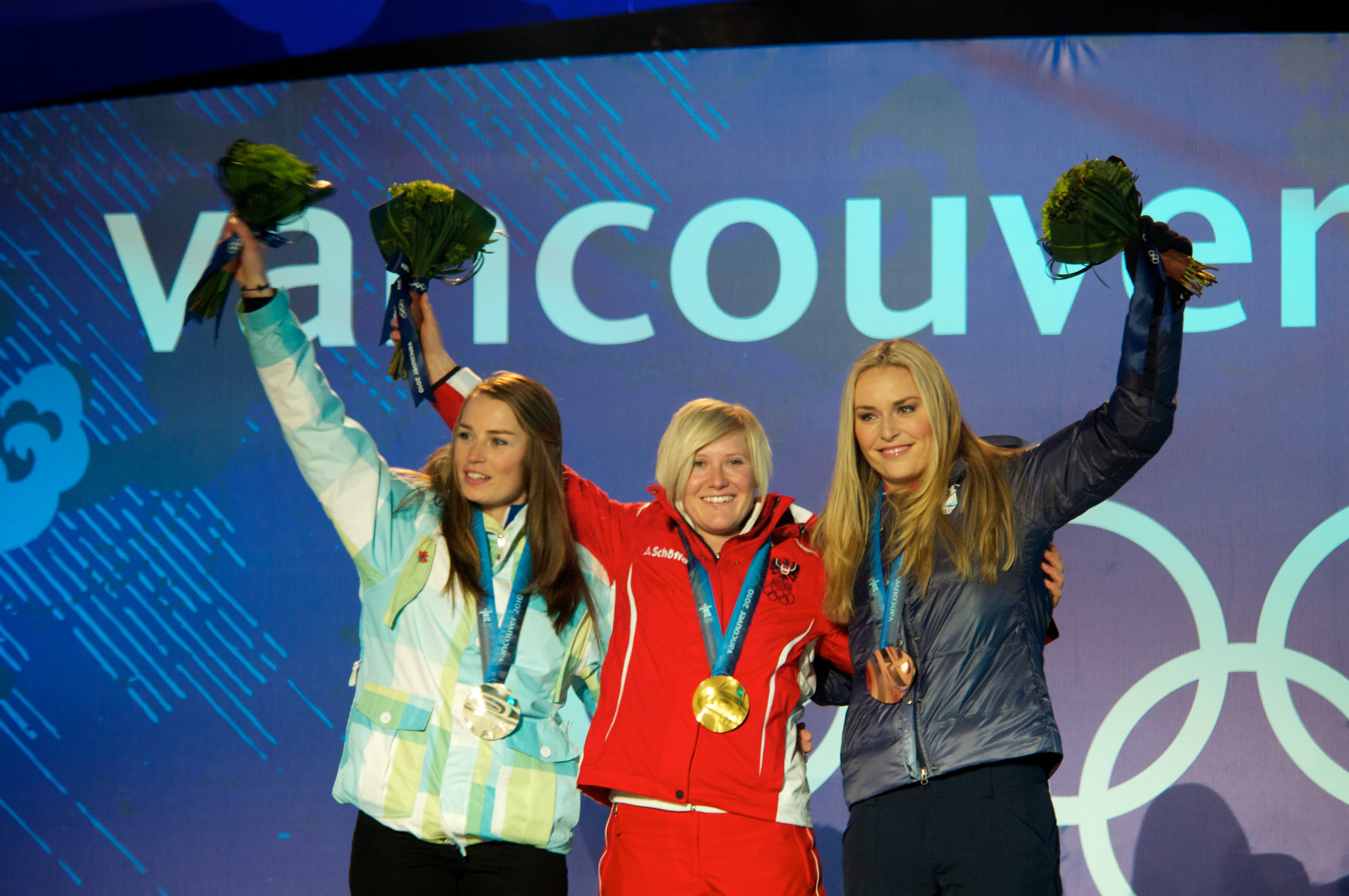
From left to right: Tina Maze of Slovenia (silver), Andrea Fischbacher of Austria (gold) and Lindsey Vonn of the United States (bronze) with the medals they earned in women's super-G in alpine skiing.

The 2010 Winter Olympics, officially known as the XXI Olympic Winter Games, was a winter multi-sport event held in Vancouver, British Columbia, Canada, from February 12 to February 28. A total of 2,632 athletes (+124 from 2006 Olympics) representing 82 National Olympic Committees (NOCs) (+2 from 2006) participated in 86 medal events (+2 from 2006) from 15 different sports and disciplines (unchanged from 2006).

Athletes from 26 NOCs won at least one medal, and athletes from 19 of these NOCs secured at least one gold. For the first time, Canada won a gold medal at an Olympic Games it hosted, having failed to do so at both the 1976 Summer Olympics in Montreal and the 1988 Winter Olympics in Calgary. In contrast to the lack of gold medals at these previous Olympics, the Canadian team finished first overall in gold medal wins, and became the first host nation—since Norway in 1952—to lead the gold medal count, with 14 medals. In doing so, it also broke the record for the most gold medals won by a NOC at a single Winter Olympics (the previous was 13, set by the Soviet Union in 1976 and matched by Norway in 2002). The United States placed first in total medals—its second time doing so in a Winter Games—and set a new record for most medals won by a NOC at a single Winter Olympics, with 37 (the previous record was 36, established by Germany in 2002). Athletes from Slovakia and Belarus won the first Winter Olympic gold medals for their nations.

Cross-country skier Marit Bjørgen from Norway won five medals (three gold, one silver, one bronze), more than any other athlete. Chinese short track speed skater Wang Meng tied Bjørgen for the lead in gold medals, with three.

== Medal table ==
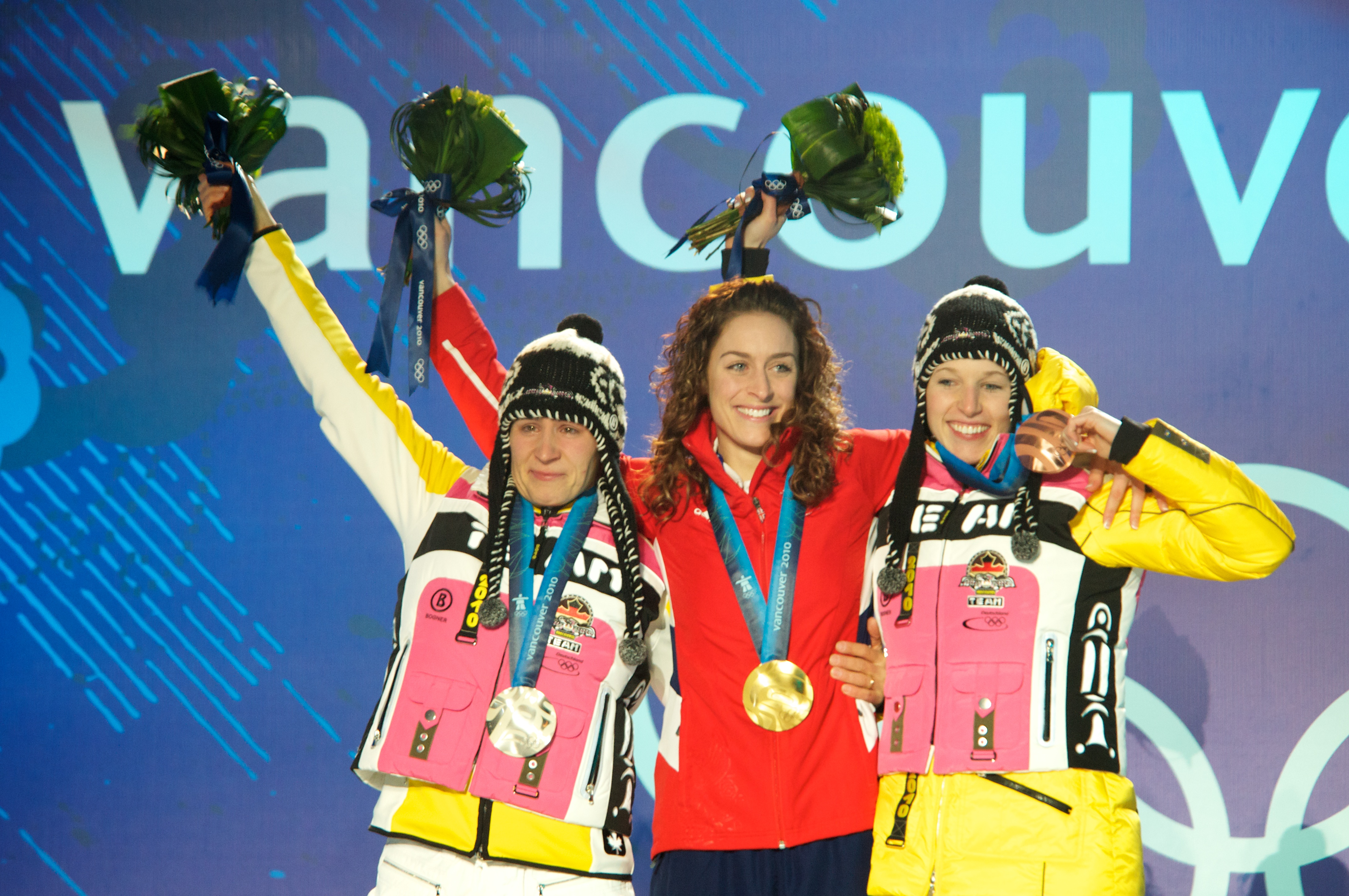
From left to right: Kerstin Szymkowiak of Germany (silver), Amy Williams of Great Britain (gold) and Anja Huber of Germany (bronze) with the medals they earned in women's skeleton.

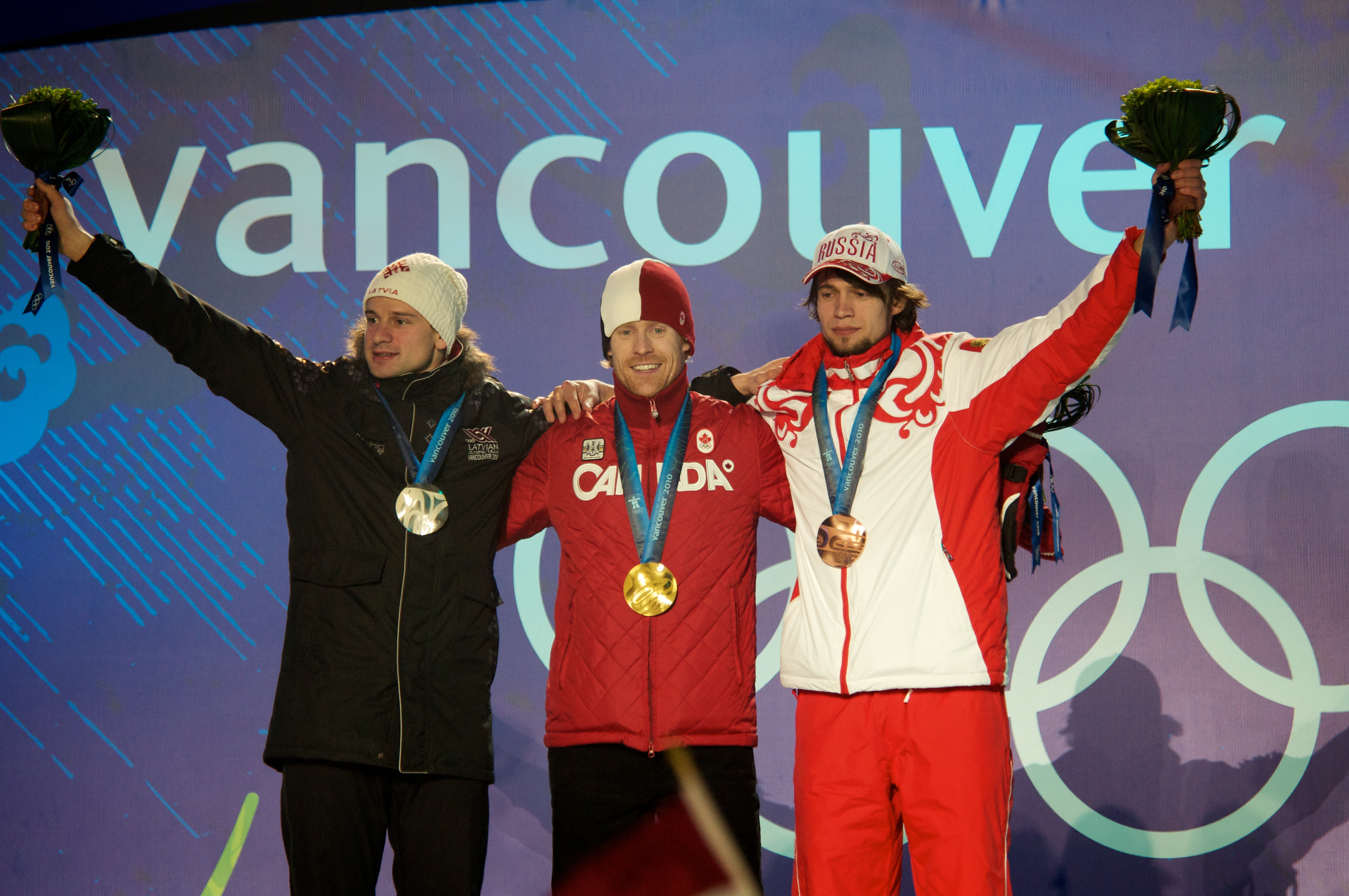
From left to right: Martins Dukurs of Latvia (silver), Jon Montgomery of Canada (gold), and Aleksandr Tretyakov of Russia (bronze) with the medals they earned in men's skeleton.

The medal table is based on information provided by the International Olympic Committee (IOC) and is consistent with IOC convention in its published medal tables. The table uses the Olympic medal table sorting method. By default, the table is ordered by the number of gold medals the athletes from a nation have won, where a nation is an entity represented by a National Olympic Committee (NOC). The number of silver medals is taken into consideration next, and then the number of bronze medals. If teams are still tied, equal ranking is given and they are listed alphabetically by their IOC country code.

In the men's individual biathlon competition, two silver medals were awarded for a second-place tie, so no bronze medal was awarded for that event.

* Host nation (Canada)

2010 Winter Olympics medal table
Rank	Nation	Gold	Silver	Bronze	Total
1	Canada*	14	7	5	26
2	Germany	10	13	7	30
3	United States	9	15	13	37
4	Norway	9	8	6	23
5	South Korea	6	6	2	14
6	Switzerland	6	0	3	9
7	Sweden	5	2	5	12
8	China	5	2	4	11
9	Austria	4	6	7	17
10	Netherlands	4	1	3	8
11	France	3	2	6	11
12	Russia	2	5	6	13
13	Australia	2	1	0	3
14	Czech Republic	2	0	4	6
15	Poland	1	3	2	6
16	Slovakia	1	2	0	3
17	Italy	1	1	3	5
18	Belarus	1	1	1	3
19	Great Britain	1	0	0	1
20	Japan	0	3	2	5
21	Croatia	0	2	1	3
21	Slovenia	0	2	1	3
23	Latvia	0	2	0	2
24	Finland	0	1	4	5
25	Estonia	0	1	0	1
25	Kazakhstan	0	1	0	1
Totals (26 entries)		86	87	85	258

== Changes in medal standings ==
On October 26, 2020, it was announced that biathlete Evgeny Ustyugov of Russia was charged by the Biathlon Integrity Unit for haemoglobin doping and could lose his 2010 gold medal. The decision was confirmed in 2024, with Ustyugov's appeal rejected in 2025. As a result, Russia's medal total decreased from three gold and 15 medals overall to two and 13, respectively.

List of official changes in medal standings
Ruling date	Sport/event	Athlete (NOC)	1st place, gold medalist(s)	2nd place, silver medalist(s)	3rd place, bronze medalist(s)	Net change	Ref.
19 September 2025	Biathlon; Men's mass start	Evgeny Ustyugov (RUS) DSQ	−1			−1	
19 September 2025	Biathlon; Men's mass start	Martin Fourcade (FRA)	+1	−1		0	
19 September 2025	Biathlon; Men's mass start	Pavol Hurajt (SVK)		+1	−1	0	
19 September 2025	Biathlon; Men's mass start	Christoph Sumann (AUT)			+1	+1	
19 September 2025	Biathlon; Men's relay	Evgeny Ustyugov (RUS) DSQ			−1	−1	
19 September 2025	Biathlon; Men's relay	team (SWE)			+1	+1	

A minus sign (−) indicates that medals were either stripped altogether or exchanged for a silver or gold when upgraded in a reallocation.

List of official changes by country
NOC	Gold	Silver	Bronze	Net Change
Russia	−1	0	−1	−2
France	+1	−1	0	0
Slovakia	0	+1	−1	0
Austria	0	0	+1	+1
Sweden	0	0	+1	+1

== See also ==
- 2010 Winter Paralympics medal table
