= Norway at the 2010 Winter Olympics =

- IOC code: NOR
- NOC: Norwegian Olympic Committee and Confederation of Sports
- Website: www.idrett.no (in Norwegian)

in Vancouver
- Competitors: 99 in 11 sports
- Flag bearers: Tommy Jakobsen (opening); Petter Northug (closing)
- Medals Ranked 4th: Gold 9 Silver 8 Bronze 6 Total 23

Winter Olympics appearances (overview)
- 1924; 1928; 1932; 1936; 1948; 1952; 1956; 1960; 1964; 1968; 1972; 1976; 1980; 1984; 1988; 1992; 1994; 1998; 2002; 2006; 2010; 2014; 2018; 2022; 2026

Norway participated at the 2010 Winter Olympics in Vancouver, British Columbia, Canada. Norway sent 99 competitors to the games and ended up with the fourth largest number of gold medals among participating nations.

== Medalists ==
Medal	Name	Sport	Event	Date
Gold	Marit Bjørgen	Cross-country skiing	Women's sprint	17 February
Gold	Tora Berger	Biathlon	Women's individual	18 February
Gold	Emil Hegle Svendsen	Biathlon	Men's individual	18 February
Gold	Aksel Lund Svindal	Alpine skiing	Men's super-G	19 February
Gold	Marit Bjørgen	Cross-country skiing	Women's 15 km pursuit	19 February
Gold	Øystein Pettersen; Petter Northug	Cross-country skiing	Men's team sprint	22 February
Gold	Vibeke Skofterud; Therese Johaug; Kristin Størmer Steira; Marit Bjørgen	Cross-country skiing	Women's 4 x 5 km relay	25 February
Gold	Halvard Hanevold; Tarjei Bø; Emil Hegle Svendsen; Ole Einar Bjørndalen	Biathlon	Men's relay	26 February
Gold	Petter Northug	Cross-country skiing	Men's 50 km classical	28 February
Silver	Emil Hegle Svendsen	Biathlon	Men's sprint	14 February
Silver	Aksel Lund Svindal	Alpine skiing	Men's downhill	15 February
Silver	Ole Einar Bjørndalen	Biathlon	Men's individual	18 February
Silver	Kjetil Jansrud	Alpine skiing	Men's giant slalom	23 February
Silver	Hedda Berntsen	Freestyle skiing	Women's ski cross	23 February
Silver	Martin Johnsrud Sundby; Odd-Bjørn Hjelmeset; Lars Berger; Petter Northug	Cross-country skiing	Men's 4 x 10 km relay	24 February
Silver	Marit Bjørgen	Cross-country skiing	Women's 30 km classical	27 February
Silver	Thomas Ulsrud; Torger Nergård; Christoffer Svae; Håvard Vad Petersson; Thomas Løvold	Curling	Men's tournament	27 February
Bronze	Marit Bjørgen	Cross-country skiing	Women's 10 km freestyle	15 February
Bronze	Petter Northug	Cross-country skiing	Men's sprint	17 February
Bronze	Håvard Bøkko	Speed skating	Men's 1500 m	20 February
Bronze	Audun Grønvold	Freestyle skiing	Men's ski cross	21 February
Bronze	Anders Bardal; Tom Hilde; Johan Remen Evensen; Anders Jacobsen	Ski jumping	Large hill team	22 February
Bronze	Aksel Lund Svindal	Alpine skiing	Men's giant slalom	23 February

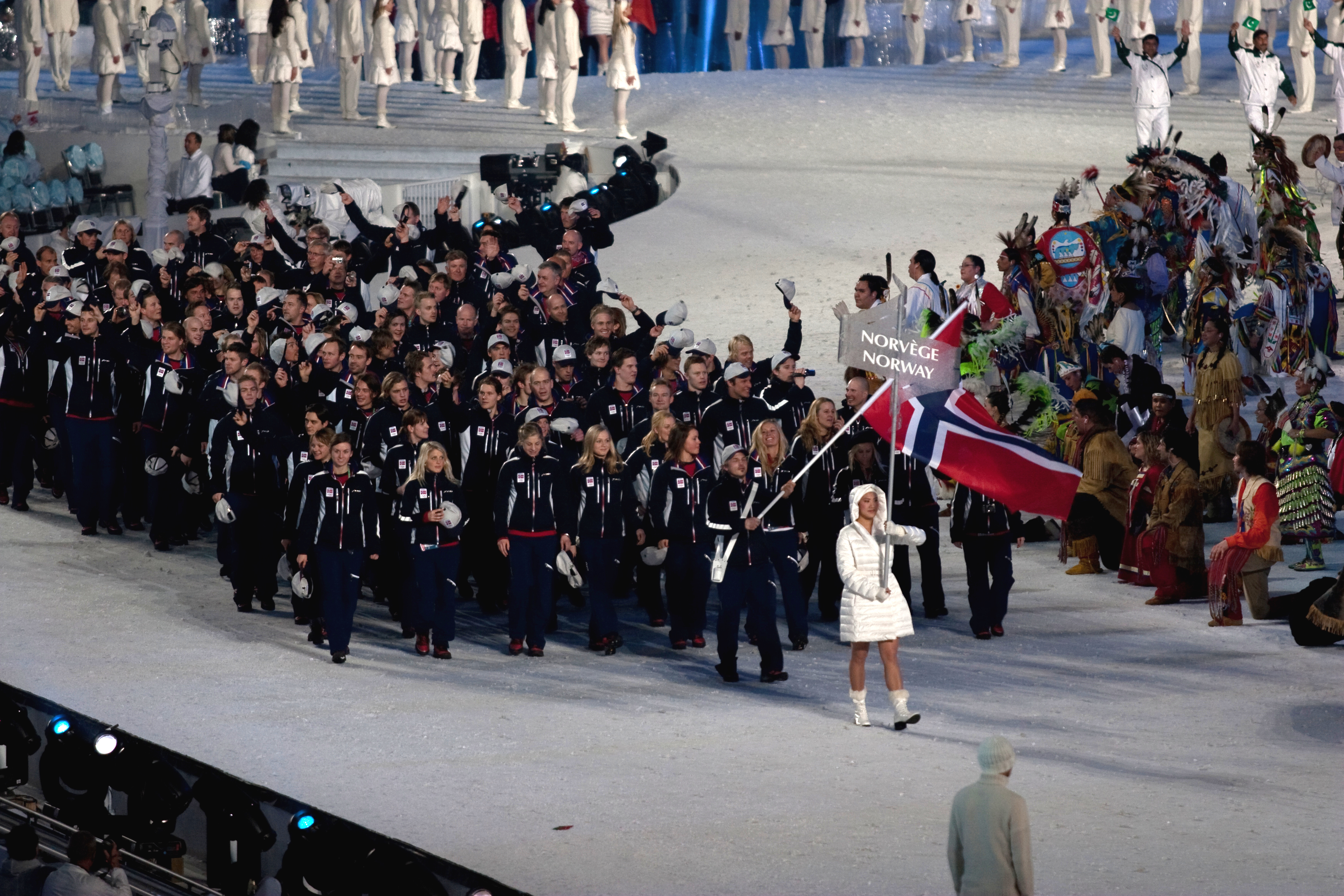
The athletes entering the stadium during the opening ceremonies.

Medals by sport
Sport	gold	silver	bronze	Total
Cross-country skiing	5	2	2	9
Biathlon	3	2	0	5
Alpine skiing	1	2	1	4
Freestyle skiing	0	1	1	2
Ski jumping	0	0	1	1
Speed skating	0	0	1	1
Curling	0	1	0	1
Total	9	8	6	23

== Alpine skiing ==
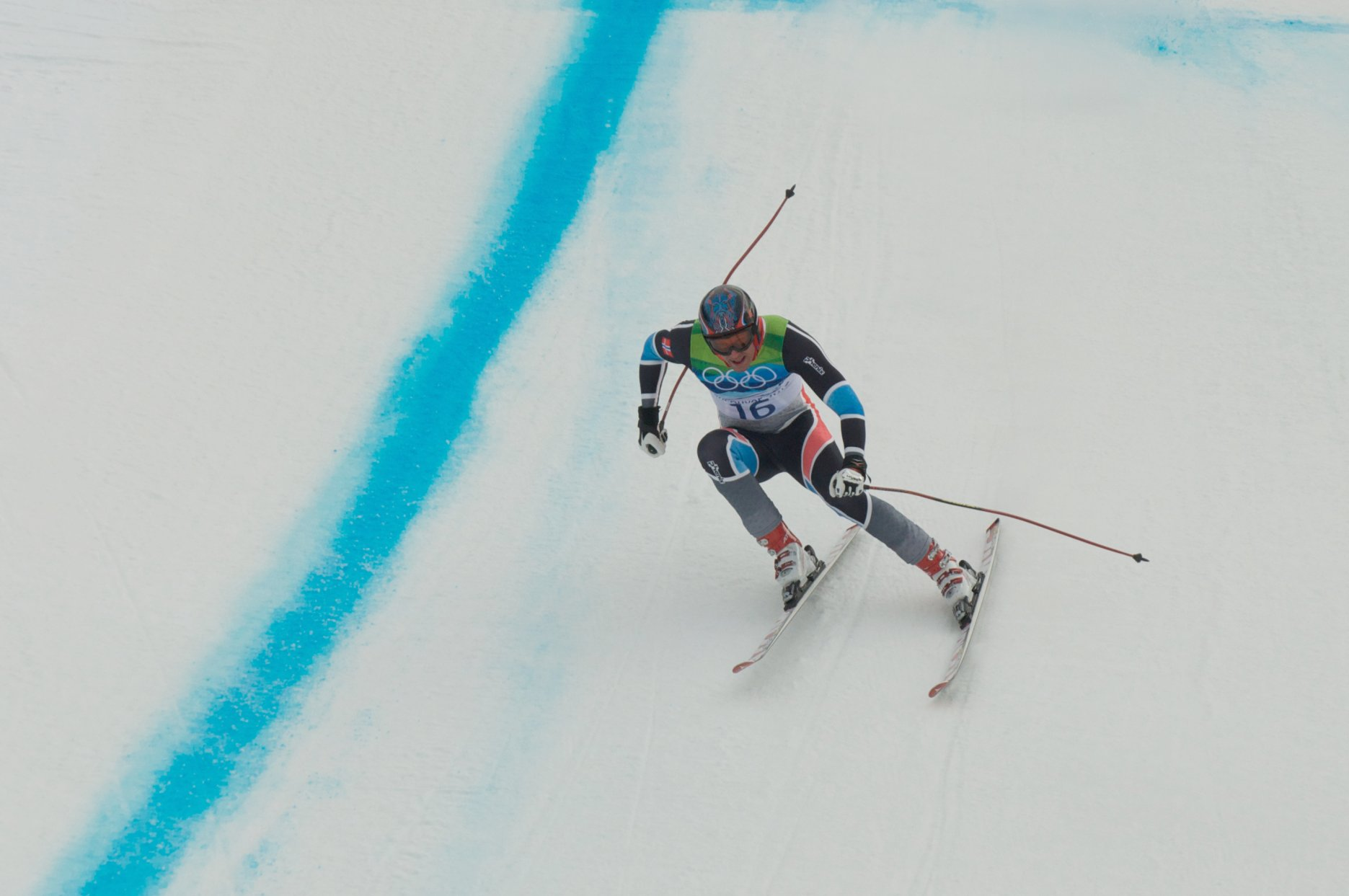
Aksel Lund Svindal racing for the silver medal in the men's downhill.

Athlete	Event	Final			
Athlete	Event	Run 1	Run 2	Total	Rank
Leif Kristian Haugen	Men's giant slalom	1:19.58	1:22.20	2:41.78	28
Leif Kristian Haugen	Men's slalom	did not finish			
Kjetil Jansrud	Men's downhill			1:56.69	31
Kjetil Jansrud	Men's super-G			1:31.21	12
Kjetil Jansrud	Men's combined	1:55.44	51.06	2:46.50	9
Kjetil Jansrud	Men's giant slalom	1:18.07	1:20.15	2:38.22	2nd place, silver medalist(s)
Kjetil Jansrud	Men's slalom	49.54	49.54	1:41.57	17
Truls Ove Karlsen	Men's downhill			1:59.52	46
Truls Ove Karlsen	Men's super-G			did not finish	
Truls Ove Karlsen	Men's combined	1:57.32	51.99	2:49.31	22
Truls Ove Karlsen	Men's giant slalom	1:18.93	1:21.27	2:40.20	21
Truls Ove Karlsen	Men's slalom	did not finish			
Mona Løseth	Women's combined	1:27.72	44.96	2:12.68	13
Mona Løseth	Women's super-G			1:23.97	21
Mona Løseth	Women's giant slalom	did not finish			
Mona Løseth	Women's slalom	54.53	did not finish		
Lars Elton Myhre	Men's downhill			1:56.69	31
Lars Elton Myhre	Men's super-G			1:32.36	25
Lars Elton Myhre	Men's combined	1:55.44	did not finish		
Lars Elton Myhre	Men's slalom	did not finish			
Aksel Lund Svindal	Men's downhill			1:54.38	2nd place, silver medalist(s)
Aksel Lund Svindal	Men's super-G			1:30.34	1st place, gold medalist(s)
Aksel Lund Svindal	Men's combined	1:53.15	did not finish		
Aksel Lund Svindal	Men's giant slalom	1:17.43	1:21.01	2:38.44	3rd place, bronze medalist(s)

Note: In the super combined, run 1 is the downhill, and run 2 is the slalom.

== Biathlon ==
Men

Athlete	Event	Final		
Athlete	Event	Time	Misses	Rank
Ole Einar Bjørndalen	Sprint	25:48.9	4	17
Ole Einar Bjørndalen	Pursuit	34:29.8	2	7
Ole Einar Bjørndalen	Individual	48:32.0	2	2nd place, silver medalist(s)
Ole Einar Bjørndalen	Mass start	37:46.5	7	27
Tarjei Bø	Individual	51:51.5	3	21
Lars Berger	Sprint	26:53.0	4	46
Lars Berger	Pursuit	35:37.2	2	23
Halvard Hanevold	Sprint	26:07.7	1	24
Halvard Hanevold	Pursuit	35:13.1	2	17
Halvard Hanevold	Mass start	36:56.6	3	19
Alexander Os	Individual	52:19.8	3	28
Emil Hegle Svendsen	Sprint	24:20.0	1	2nd place, silver medalist(s)
Emil Hegle Svendsen	Pursuit	34:30.4	4	8
Emil Hegle Svendsen	Individual	48:22.5	1	1st place, gold medalist(s)
Emil Hegle Svendsen	Mass start	36:20.7	3	13
Halvard Hanevold; Tarjei Bø; Emil Hegle Svendsen; Ole Einar Bjørndalen	Relay	1:21:38.1	0+1; 0+2; 0+2; 0+2	1st place, gold medalist(s)

Women

Athlete	Event	Final		
Athlete	Event	Time	Misses	Rank
Liv Kjersti Eikeland	Sprint	22:51.9	4	70
Liv Kjersti Eikeland	Individual	48:00.7	5	70
Ann Kristin Flatland	Sprint	20:29.7	1	10
Ann Kristin Flatland	Pursuit	31:33.3	1	8
Ann Kristin Flatland	Individual	43:06.4	2	14
Ann Kristin Flatland	Mass start	36:16.0	4	11
Gro Marit Istad Kristiansen	Sprint	22:41.0	5	66
Solveig Rogstad	Individual	46:55.1	4	61
Tora Berger	Sprint	21:42.1	2	33
Tora Berger	Pursuit	31:07.2	0	5
Tora Berger	Individual	40:52.8	1	1st place, gold medalist(s)
Tora Berger	Mass start	36:58.3	4	18
Liv Kjersti Eikeland; Ann Kristin Flatland; Solveig Rogstad; Tora Berger	Relay	1:10:34.1	0+2; 0+0; 0+0; 0+1	4

== Cross-country skiing ==
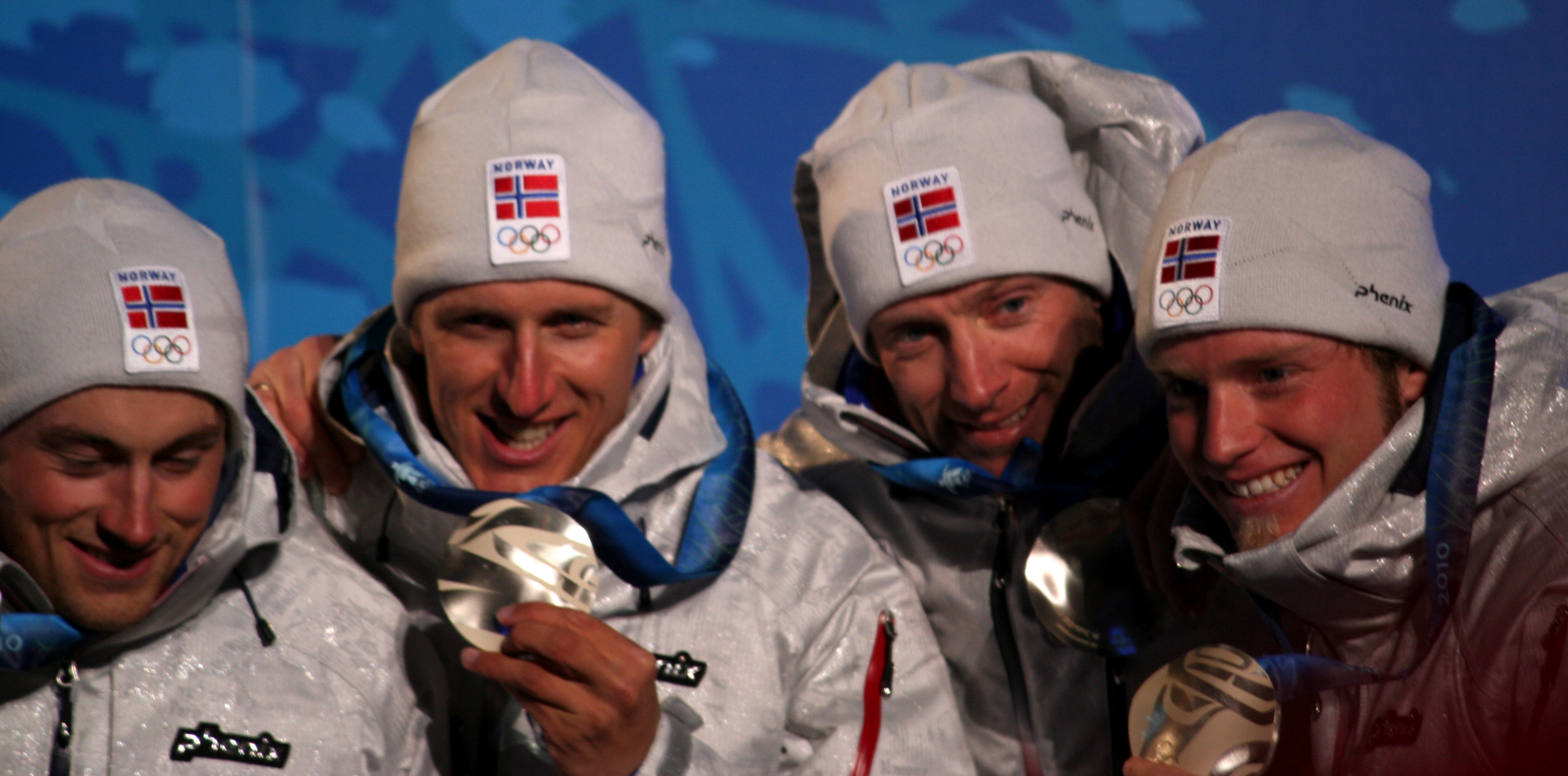
The silver medal winning team in the men's 4 x 10 km relay

Men

Athlete	Event	Final	
Athlete	Event	Time	Rank
Petter Northug	15 km freestyle	35:39.5	41
Petter Northug	30 km pursuit	1:15:53.1	11
Petter Northug	50 km classical	2:05.35.5	1st place, gold medalist(s)
Ronny Hafsås	15 km freestyle	35:41.8	42
Martin Johnsrud Sundby	15 km freestyle	35:26.3	33
Martin Johnsrud Sundby	30 km pursuit	1:17:05.5	17
Martin Johnsrud Sundby	50 km classical	2:05.57.7	15
Eldar Rønning	30 km pursuit	1:21:14.1	36
Tord Asle Gjerdalen	15 km freestyle	35:10.5	28
Tord Asle Gjerdalen	30 km pursuit	1:17:04.5	19
Odd-Bjørn Hjelmeset	50 km classical	2:06.08.3	17
Jens Arne Svartedal	50 km classical	2:07.32.5	23
Martin Johnsrud Sundby; Odd-Bjørn Hjelmeset; Lars Berger; Petter Northug	4 x 10 km relay	1:45:21.3	2nd place, silver medalist(s)

Sprint

Athlete	Event	Qualification		Quarterfinals		Semifinals		Final	
Athlete	Event	Time	Rank	Time	Rank	Time	Rank	Time	Rank
Petter Northug	Sprint	3:37.09	6 Q	3:34.5	1 Q	3:36.7	2 Q	3:45.5	3rd place, bronze medalist(s)
Ola Vigen Hattestad	Sprint	3:36.43	3 Q	3:37.8	1 Q	3:36.5	1 Q	3:50.0	4
Øystein Pettersen	Sprint	3:37.34	7 Q	3:36.9	1 Q	3:34.4	2 Q	4:56.2	6
Johan Kjølstad	Sprint	3:36.65	5 Q	3:35.3	3 q	3:35.9	5	DNQ	9
Jens Arne Svartedal									
Øystein Pettersen; Petter Northug	Team sprint					18:48.5	2 Q	19:01.0	1st place, gold medalist(s)

Women

Athlete	Event	Final	
Athlete	Event	Time	Rank
Marit Bjørgen	10 km freestyle	25:14.3	3rd place, bronze medalist(s)
Marit Bjørgen	15 km pursuit	39:58.1	1st place, gold medalist(s)
Marit Bjørgen	30 km classical	1:30.34.0	2nd place, silver medalist(s)
Kristin Størmer Steira	10 km freestyle	25:50.5	8
Kristin Størmer Steira	15 km pursuit	40:07.5	4
Kristin Størmer Steira	30 km classical	1:32.04.4	8
Vibeke Skofterud	10 km freestyle	26:16.3	22
Vibeke Skofterud	15 km pursuit	did not finish	
Marthe Kristoffersen	10 km freestyle	27:38.4	49
Marthe Kristoffersen	30 km classical	1:34.31.5	21
Therese Johaug	15 km pursuit	40:50.0	6
Therese Johaug	30 km classical	1:32.01.3	7
Vibeke Skofterud; Therese Johaug; Kristin Størmer Steira; Marit Bjørgen	4 x 5 km relay	55:19.5	1st place, gold medalist(s)

Sprint

Athlete	Event	Qualification		Quarterfinals		Semifinals		Final	
Athlete	Event	Time	Rank	Time	Rank	Time	Rank	Time	Rank
Marit Bjørgen	Sprint	3:38.05	1 Q	3:35.4	1 Q	3:39.3	1 Q	3:39.2	1st place, gold medalist(s)
Celine Brun-Lie	Sprint	3:44.71	8 Q	3:39.7	3 q	3:40.1	3 q	3:51.5	6
Maiken Caspersen Falla	Sprint	3:50.23	28 Q	3:41.6	4	did not qualify			18
Astrid Uhrenholdt Jacobsen	Sprint	3:45.01	11 Q	3:39.0	2 Q	3:44.2	3	DNQ	7
Astrid Uhrenholdt Jacobsen; Celine Brun-Lie	Team sprint					18:47.2	2 Q	18:32.8	5

== Curling ==
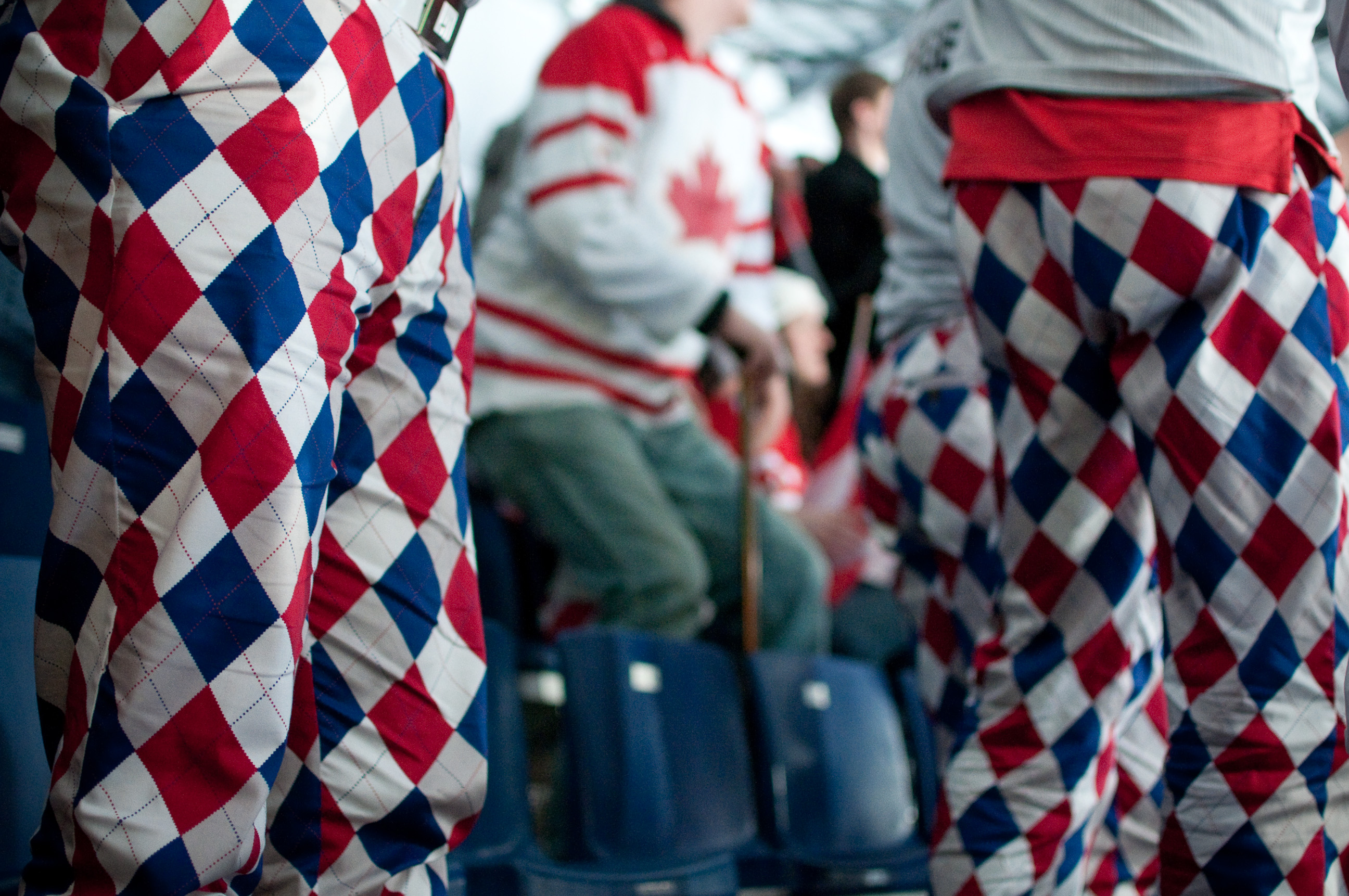
Norway's curling pants caused quite a stir.

Team: Thomas Ulsrud (skip), Torger Nergaard, Håvard Vad Petersson, Christoffer Svae, Thomas Løvold (alternate).

Much attention was paid to the team's pants, in the international media and on social media networks. The men wore pants with a red, white and blue diamond pattern from Loudmouth Golf. The pants were picked for the team by second Chris Svae.

Summary

Team	Event	Group Stage										Tiebreaker	Semifinal	Final / BM	
Team	Event	Opposition Score	Opposition Score	Opposition Score	Opposition Score	Opposition Score	Opposition Score	Opposition Score	Opposition Score	Opposition Score	Rank	Opposition Score	Opposition Score	Opposition Score	Rank
Torger Nergård; Håvard Vad Petersson; Christoffer Svae; Thomas Ulsrud; Thomas Løvold	Men's tournament	CAN; L 6–7	USA; W 6–5	GER; W 7–4	SUI; W 7–4	CHN; W 7–5	DEN; W 6–3	SWE; L 8–7	FRA; W 9–2	GBR; W 9–5	2 Q	BYE	SUI; W 7–5	CAN; L 3–6	2nd place, silver medalist(s)

=== Men's tournament ===
Standings

Final round robin standings
Team	Skip	Pld	W	L	PF	PA	EW	EL	BE	SE	S%	Qualification
Canada	Kevin Martin	9	9	0	75	36	36	28	14	2	85%	Playoffs
Norway	Thomas Ulsrud	9	7	2	64	43	40	32	15	7	84%	Playoffs
Switzerland	Ralph Stöckli	9	6	3	53	44	35	33	20	8	81%	Playoffs
Sweden	Niklas Edin	9	5	4	50	52	34	36	20	6	82%	Tiebreaker
Great Britain	David Murdoch	9	5	4	57	44	35	29	20	9	81%	Tiebreaker
Germany	Andy Kapp	9	4	5	48	60	35	38	11	9	75%	
France	Thomas Dufour	9	3	6	37	63	22	34	16	7	73%	
China	Wang Fengchun	9	2	7	52	60	37	37	9	7	77%	
Denmark	Ulrik Schmidt	9	2	7	45	63	31	29	12	6	78%	
United States	John Shuster	9	2	7	43	59	32	41	18	9	76%	

Round-robin

Norway had a bye in draws 3, 8 and 11.

Draw 1

Tuesday, 16 February, 09:00

Sheet B	1	2	3	4	5	6	7	8	9	10	11	Final
Norway (Ulsrud)	0	0	1	0	3	0	0	0	0	2	0	6
Canada (Martin) 🔨	0	3	0	2	0	0	0	0	1	0	1	7

Draw 2

Tuesday, 16 February, 19:00

Sheet D	1	2	3	4	5	6	7	8	9	10	11	Final
United States (Shuster) 🔨	0	0	0	1	0	0	2	0	2	0	0	5
Norway (Ulsrud)	0	1	0	0	1	0	0	2	0	1	1	6

Draw 4

Thursday, 18 February, 09:00

Sheet B	1	2	3	4	5	6	7	8	9	10	Final
Germany (Kapp) 🔨	0	1	0	1	0	1	0	0	1	0	4
Norway (Ulsrud)	1	0	2	0	2	0	1	0	0	1	7

Draw 5

Thursday, 18 February, 19:00

Sheet C	1	2	3	4	5	6	7	8	9	10	Final
Norway (Ulsrud) 🔨	2	0	0	1	0	1	0	1	0	2	7
Switzerland (Stöckli)	0	0	1	0	1	0	1	0	1	0	4

Draw 6

Friday, 19 February, 14:00

Sheet D	1	2	3	4	5	6	7	8	9	10	Final
Norway (Ulsrud) 🔨	1	0	1	0	0	1	0	2	0	2	7
China (Wang)	0	1	0	1	0	0	1	0	2	0	5

Draw 7

Saturday, 20 February, 09:00

Sheet A	1	2	3	4	5	6	7	8	9	10	Final
Norway (Ulsrud)	0	1	0	2	0	0	0	3	0	x	6
Denmark (Schmidt) 🔨	0	0	1	0	1	0	0	0	1	x	3

Draw 9

Sunday, 21 February, 14:00

Sheet B	1	2	3	4	5	6	7	8	9	10	Final
Norway (Ulsrud) 🔨	2	0	0	2	0	2	0	1	0	0	7
Sweden (Edin)	0	3	0	0	1	0	2	0	1	1	8

Draw 10

Monday, 22 February, 09:00

Sheet A	1	2	3	4	5	6	7	8	9	10	Final
France (Dufour)	0	0	0	1	0	1	0	0	x	x	2
Norway (Ulsrud) 🔨	1	1	1	0	1	0	3	2	x	x	9

Draw 12

Tuesday, 23 February, 14:00

Sheet C	1	2	3	4	5	6	7	8	9	10	Final
Great Britain (Murdoch) 🔨	0	3	0	1	0	0	0	1	x	x	5
Norway (Ulsrud)	2	0	2	0	2	0	3	0	x	x	9

Semifinal

Thursday, 25 February, 14:00

Sheet D	1	2	3	4	5	6	7	8	9	10	Final
Switzerland (Stöckli)	0	0	0	1	0	2	0	1	0	1	5
Norway (Ulsrud) 🔨	0	1	1	0	2	0	1	0	2	0	7

Gold medal game

Saturday, 27 February, 15:00

Team	1	2	3	4	5	6	7	8	9	10	Final
Canada (Martin) 🔨	0	1	0	1	1	0	2	0	1	x	6
Norway (Ulsrud)	0	0	0	0	0	2	0	1	0	x	3

== Freestyle skiing ==
Men

Athlete	Event	Qualifying		1/8 finals	Quarterfinals	Semifinals	Finals	
Athlete	Event	Time	Rank	Position	Position	Position	Position	Rank
Audun Grønvold	Men's ski cross	1:13.23	5 Q	1 Q	1 Q	1 Q	3	3rd place, bronze medalist(s)
Anders Rekdal	Men's ski cross	1:14.17	17 Q	DNF	did not advance			22

Women

Athlete	Event	Qualifying		1/8 finals	Quarterfinals	Semifinals	Finals	
Athlete	Event	Time	Rank	Position	Position	Position	Position	Rank
Hedda Berntsen	Women's ski cross	1:17.96	5 Q	1 Q	1 Q	1 Q	2	2nd place, silver medalist(s)
Marte Høie Gjefsen	Women's ski cross	1:19.30	12 Q	2 Q	3	did not advance		
Julie Jensen	Women's ski cross	1:20.23	18 Q	1 Q	2 Q	4	Small final 4	8
Gro Kvinlog	Women's ski cross	1:21.93	27 Q	3	did not advance			

== Ice hockey ==
=== Men's tournament ===
Roster

The following is the Norwegian roster in the men's ice hockey tournament of the 2010 Winter Olympics.

No.	Pos.	Name	Height	Weight	Birthdate	Birthplace	2009–10 team
33	G	Pål Grotnes	188 cm (6 ft 2 in)	86 kg (190 lb)	7 March 1977	Lørenskog	(Norway) Stjernen (GET)
34	G	André Lysenstøen	194 cm (6 ft 4 in)	112 kg (247 lb)	27 October 1988	Oslo	(Finland) HeKi (Mestis)
30	G	Ruben Smith	182 cm (6 ft 0 in)	75 kg (165 lb)	15 April 1984	Stavanger	(Norway) Storhamar Dragons (GET)
47	D	Alexander Bonsaksen	181 cm (5 ft 11 in)	83 kg (183 lb)	24 January 1987	Oslo	(Sweden) Modo (SEL)
6	D	Jonas Holøs	180 cm (5 ft 11 in)	88 kg (194 lb)	27 August 1987	Sarpsborg	(Sweden) Färjestad (SEL)
7	D	Tommy Jakobsen – C	173 cm (5 ft 8 in)	83 kg (183 lb)	10 December 1970	Oslo	(Norway) Lørenskog (GET)
5	D	Juha Kaunismäki	187 cm (6 ft 2 in)	88 kg (194 lb)	6 May 1979	Helsinki, Finland	(Norway) Stavanger Oilers (GET)
36	D	Lars Erik Lund	188 cm (6 ft 2 in)	95 kg (209 lb)	25 July 1974	Oslo	(Norway) Vålerenga (GET)
55	D	Ole-Kristian Tollefsen	188 cm (6 ft 2 in)	96 kg (212 lb)	29 March 1984	Oslo	(United States) Grand Rapids Griffins (AHL)
23	D	Mats Trygg – A	178 cm (5 ft 10 in)	82 kg (181 lb)	1 June 1976	Oslo	(Germany) Kölner Haie (DEL)
42	F	Jonas Solberg Andersen	184 cm (6 ft 0 in)	85 kg (187 lb)	8 March 1981	Sarpsborg	(Norway) Sparta Warriors (GET)
20	F	Anders Bastiansen	188 cm (6 ft 2 in)	97 kg (214 lb)	31 October 1980	Oslo	(Sweden) Färjestad (SEL)
26	F	Kristian Forsberg	183 cm (6 ft 0 in)	86 kg (190 lb)	5 May 1986	Oslo	(Sweden) Modo (SEL)
8	F	Mads Hansen – A	183 cm (6 ft 0 in)	90 kg (200 lb)	16 September 1978	Oslo	(Sweden) Brynäs (SEL)
9	F	Marius Holtet	183 cm (6 ft 0 in)	81 kg (179 lb)	31 August 1984	Hamar	(Sweden) Färjestad (SEL)
10	F	Lars Erik Spets	178 cm (5 ft 10 in)	82 kg (181 lb)	2 April 1985	Trondheim	(Norway) Vålerenga (GET)
46	F	Mathis Olimb	179 cm (5 ft 10 in)	79 kg (174 lb)	1 February 1986	Oslo	(Sweden) Frölunda (SEL)
22	F	Martin Røymark	184 cm (6 ft 0 in)	86 kg (190 lb)	10 November 1986	Oslo	(Sweden) Frölunda (SEL)
19	F	Per-Åge Skrøder	180 cm (5 ft 11 in)	92 kg (203 lb)	4 August 1978	Sarpsborg	(Sweden) Modo (SEL)
41	F	Patrick Thoresen	180 cm (5 ft 11 in)	85 kg (187 lb)	7 November 1983	Oslo	(Russia) Salavat Yulaev Ufa (KHL)
29	F	Tore Vikingstad	191 cm (6 ft 3 in)	93 kg (205 lb)	8 October 1975	Trondheim	(Germany) Hannover Scorpions (DEL)
35	F	Martin Laumann Ylven	190 cm (6 ft 3 in)	92 kg (203 lb)	22 December 1988	Oslo	(Sweden) Linköping (SEL)
48	F	Mats Zuccarello Aasen	170 cm (5 ft 7 in)	73 kg (161 lb)	1 September 1987	Oslo	(Sweden) Modo (SEL)

Forward Morten Ask was initially selected, but was injured and replaced by Jonas Solberg Andersen.

==== Group play ====
Norway played in Group A.

Round-robin

All times are local (UTC-8).

16 February 2010; 16:30	Canada	8–0 (0–0, 3–0, 5–0)	Norway	Canada Hockey Place, Vancouver; Attendance: 16,652

Game reference

Roberto Luongo
Goalies
Pål Grotnes (out 44:29) / André Lysenstøen (in 44:29)
Referees:
(Finland) Jyri Rönn
(United States) Chris Rooney
Linesmen:
(Finland) Stefan Fonselius
(United States) Tim Nowak

J. Iginla (S. Crosby, D. Doughty) (PP) – 22:30	1–0
D. Heatley (C. Pronger, J. Thornton) – 24:27	2–0
M. Richards (P. Bergeron, S. Weber) – 31:06	3–0
R. Getzlaf (S. Niedermayer, J. Toews) – 44:29	4–0
D. Heatley (P. Marleau, D. Boyle) (PP) – 46:43	5–0
J. Iginla (R. Nash, S. Crosby) – 47:36	6–0
C. Perry (E. Staal, D. Boyle) – 51:03	7–0
J. Iginla (R. Nash, S. Crosby) – 58:11	8–0

10 min
Penalties
12 min
42
Shots
15

18 February 2010; 12:00	United States	6–1 (2–0, 1–1, 3–0)	Norway	Canada Hockey Place, Vancouver; Attendance: 16,710

Game reference

Ryan Miller
Goalies
Pål Grotnes
Referees:
(Canada) Marc Joannette
(Canada) Guy Pellerin
Linesmen:
(Czech Republic) Petr Blümel
(Canada) Jean Morin

P. Kessel (J. Pavelski, R. Malone) – 2:39	1–0
C. Drury (R. Callahan, D. Backes) – 13:04	2–0
P. Kane (Z. Parise) – 25:52	3–0
	3–1	28:37 – M. Holtet (SH)
R. Malone (J. Johnson, R. Miller) – 54:19	4–1
B. Rafalski (Z. Parise, P. Kessel) (PP) – 57:00	5–1
B. Rafalski (R. Suter, J. Pavelski) – 59:23	6–1

4 min
Penalties
10 min
39
Shots
11

20 February 2010; 12:00	Norway	4–5 (OT) (1–1, 2–2, 1–1, 0–1)	Switzerland	Canada Hockey Place, Vancouver; Attendance: 16,952

Game reference

Pål Grotnes
Goalies
Jonas Hiller
Referees:
(Canada) Paul Devorski
(Slovakia) Peter Ország
Linesmen:
(Slovakia) Milan Novak
(Germany) Felix Winnekens

	0–1	1:03 – J. Sprunger (H. Domenichelli, R. Sannitz)
T. Vikingstad (P. Thoresen, T. Jakobsen) – 12:21	1–1
M. Hansen (P. Thoresen) (PP) – 25:24	2–1
	2–2	29:15 – R. Wick (M. Seger, M. Plüss)
	2–3	35:42 – R. Sannitz (M. Seger, R. Wick)
T. Vikingstad (M. Zuccarello, M. Olimb) – 38:46	3–3
	3–4	49:56 – S. Blindenbacher (R. Wick, M. Streit) (PP)
T. Vikingstad (P. Thoresen) – 52:18	4–4
	4–5	62:28 – R. Lemm (S. Jeannin)

4 min
Penalties
10 min
23
Shots
38

Standings

Team	Pld	W	OTW	OTL	L	GF	GA	GD	Pts	Qualification
United States	3	3	0	0	0	14	5	+9	9	Quarterfinals
Canada	3	1	1	0	1	14	7	+7	5	
Switzerland	3	0	1	1	1	8	10	−2	3	
Norway	3	0	0	1	2	5	19	−14	1	

Source: IIHF

==== Final rounds ====
Qualification playoff

23 February 2010; 21:00	Slovakia	4–3 (3–1, 0–2, 1–0)	Norway	Canada Hockey Place, Vancouver; Attendance: 17,583

Game reference

Jaroslav Halák
Goalies
Pål Grotnes
Referees:
(Russia) Vyacheslav Bulanov
(Canada) Marc Joannette
Linesmen:
(Ukraine) Andriy Kicha
(Canada) Sylvain Losier

M. Handzuš (M. Gáborík, Mari. Hossa) (PP) – 7:03	1–0
M. Gáborík (P. Demitra, Z. Chára) (PP) – 9:48	2–0
	2–1	18:06 – M. Zuccarello (J. Holøs)
R. Zedník (J. Stümpel, Ž. Pálffy) (PP) – 18:52	3–1
	3–2	27:27 – T. Vikingstad (P. Thoresen, M. Zuccarello)
	3–3	39:59 – A. Bastiansen (M. Olimb, P. Thoresen)
M. Šatan (Ľ. Višňovský, R. Zedník) – 48:41	4–3

4 min
Penalties
29 min
40
Shots
19

== Nordic combined ==
Athlete	Event	Ski jumping		Cross-country		
Athlete	Event	Points	Rank	Deficit	Time	Rank
Mikko Kokslien	Normal hill/10 km	101.5	42	+2:16	27:39.2 +1:52.1	32
Magnus Moan	Normal hill/10 km	104.0	40	+2:06	26:22.7 +35.6	9
Jan Schmid	Normal hill/10 km	110.0	33	+1:42	27:10.6 +1:22.5	23
Petter Tande	Normal hill/10 km	116.0	22	+1:18	26:47.2 +1:00.1	17
Ole Christian Wendel						
Espen Rian; Magnus Moan; Jan Schmid; Petter Tande	Team large hill/4 x 5 km	468.4	7	+0:51	50:25.9 +0:54.3	5

Note: 'Deficit' refers to the amount of time behind the leader a competitor began the cross-country portion of the event. Italicized numbers show the final deficit from the winner's finishing time.

== Skeleton ==
Athlete	Event	Final					
Athlete	Event	Run 1	Run 2	Run 3	Run 4	Total	Rank
Desiree Bjerke	Women's	56.48	55.28	55.34	55.26	3:42.36	17

== Ski jumping ==
Athlete	Event	Qualifying		First round		Final		
Athlete	Event	Points	Rank	Points	Rank	Points	Total	Rank
Anders Bardal	Normal hill	122.5	21 Q	118.5	22	124.0	242.5	18
Anders Bardal	Large hill	136.7	7 Q	100.7	24	110.7	211.4	22
Johan Remen Evensen	Large hill	137.1	6 Q	109.3	17	114.3	223.6	15
Tom Hilde	Normal hill	132.0	10 Q	124.0	13	128.0	252.0	12
Tom Hilde	Large hill	135.7	8 Q	111.2	15	116.7	227.9	11
Anders Jacobsen	Normal hill	DNS	PQ	123.5	15	133.5	257.0	9
Anders Jacobsen	Large hill	n/a	PQ	199.4	9	107.0	226.4	12
Bjørn Einar Romøren	Normal hill	n/a	PQ	120.5	19	114.5	235.0	23
Anders Bardal; Tom Hilde; Johan Remen Evensen; Anders Jacobsen	Large hill team			504.0	3	526.3	1030.3	3rd place, bronze medalist(s)

== Snowboarding ==
Halfpipe

Athlete	Event	Qualifying run 1		Qualifying run 2		Semifinal		Final		
Athlete	Event	Points	Rank	Points	Rank	Points	Rank	Run 1	Run 2	Rank
Fredrik Austbø	Men's halfpipe	did not start								
Kjersti Ø. Buaas	Women's halfpipe	20.6	16	21.8	22	did not advance				
Linn Haug	Women's halfpipe	11.5	26	12.8	27	did not advance				
Tore V. Holvik	Men's halfpipe	23.1	9	19.6	15	did not advance				
Roger S. Kleivdal	Men's halfpipe	15.7	10	18.4	13	did not advance				
Ståle Sandbech	Men's halfpipe	9.1	17	20.1	10	did not advance				
Lisa H. Wiik	Women's halfpipe	23.0	19	26.5	19	did not advance				

Snowboard cross

Athlete	Event	Qualifying		1/8 finals	Quarterfinals	Semifinals	Finals	
Athlete	Event	Time	Rank	Position	Position	Position	Position	Rank
Joachim Havikhagen	Men's snowboard cross	1:23.87	25 Q	3	did not advance			
Helene Olafsen	Women's snowboard cross	1:26.94	5 Q		2 Q	1 Q	4	4
Stian Sivertzen	Men's snowboard cross	1:23.80	24 Q	4	did not advance			

== Speed skating ==
Men

Athlete	Event	Final	
Athlete	Event	Time	Rank
Håvard Bøkko	1000 m	1:10.73	19
Håvard Bøkko	1500 m	1:46.13	3rd place, bronze medalist(s)
Håvard Bøkko	5000 m	6:18.80	4
Håvard Bøkko	10000 m	13:14.92	5
Henrik Christiansen	5000 m	6:24.80	8
Henrik Christiansen	10000 m	13:25.65	7
Mikael Flygind Larsen	1000 m	1:10.38	15
Mikael Flygind Larsen	1500 m	1:46.77	8
Sverre Haugli	5000 m	6:27.05	10
Sverre Haugli	10000 m	13:18.74	6
Christoffer Fagerli Rukke	1000 m	1:12.31	35
Christoffer Fagerli Rukke	1500 m	1:48.62	20
Fredrik van der Horst	1500 m	1:49.58	29

Women

Athlete	Event	Final	
Athlete	Event	Time	Rank
Maren Haugli	3000 m	4:10.01	8
Maren Haugli	5000 m	7:02.19	5
Hege Bøkko	1000 m	1:17.43	10
Hege Bøkko	1500 m	1:59.52	14

Team pursuit

Athlete	Event	Quarterfinal	Semifinal	Final	
Athlete	Event	Opposition time	Opposition time	Opposition time	Rank
From: Håvard Bøkko, Henrik Christiansen, Mikael Flygind Larsen, Fredrik van der Horst	Men's team pursuit	South Korea (4); W 3:47.81	Canada (1); L 3:47.81	Bronze final Netherlands (3); L 3:45.96	4

== See also ==
- Norway at the 2010 Winter Paralympics
