= Shigeyuki Dejima =

Japanese speed skater (born 1982)

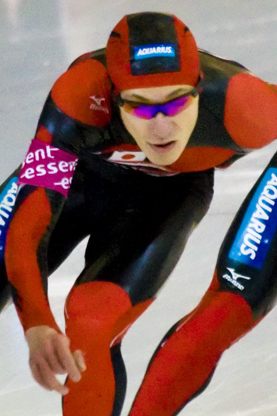
- Shigeyuki Dejima in 2009

Personal information
- Nationality: Japanese
- Born: 13 May 1982 (age 42); Hokkaido, Japan

Sport
- Sport: Speed skating

Shigeyuki Dejima (出島 茂幸, Dejima Shigeyuki, born 12 May 1982) is a Japanese speed skater. He competed in two events at the 2010 Winter Olympics.
