= Lucas Makowsky =

Canadian speed skater

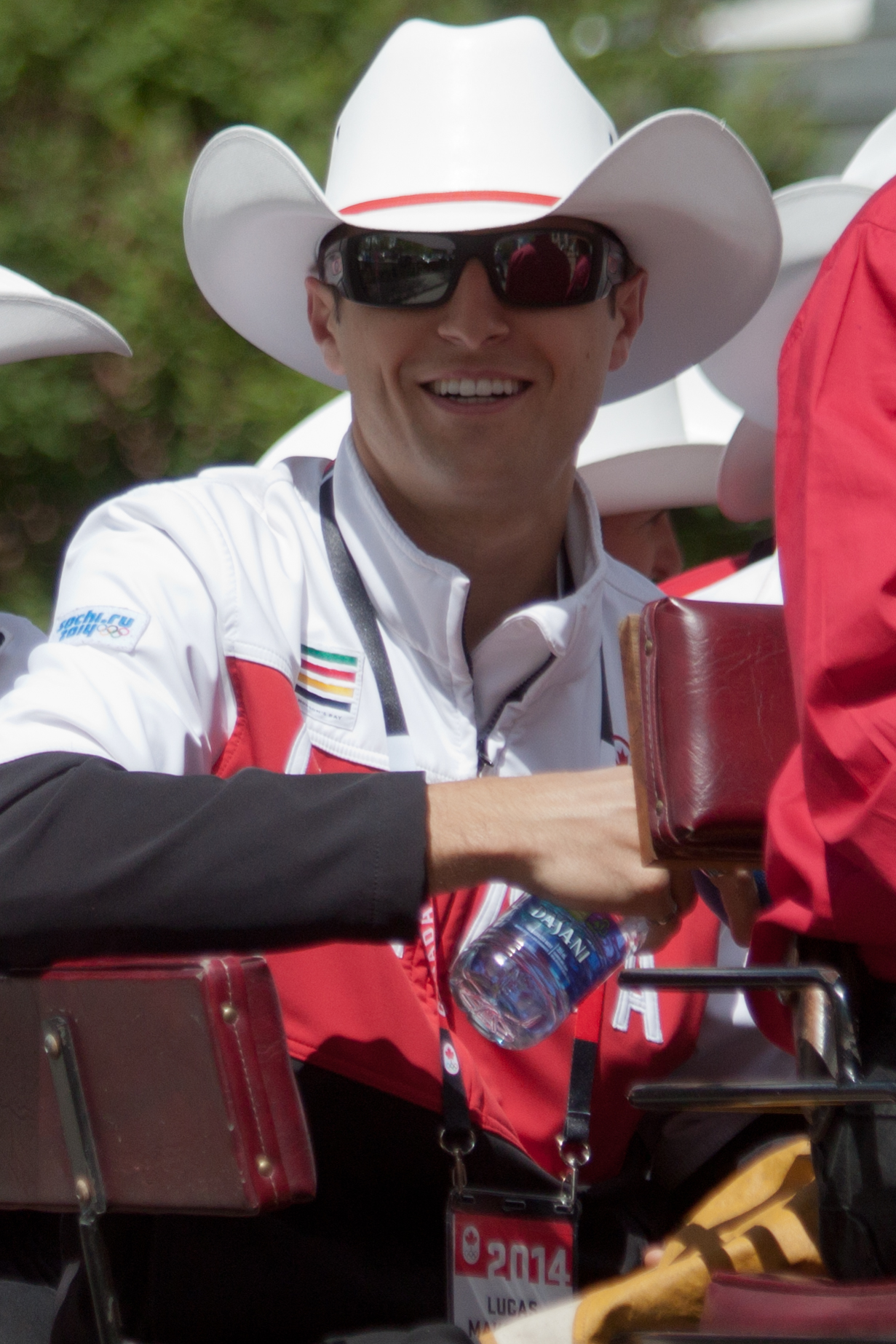
- Makowsky in Calgary (2014)

Personal information
- Born: May 30, 1987 (age 39) Regina, Saskatchewan
- Height: 1.80 m (5 ft 11 in)
- Weight: 78 kg (172 lb; 12.3 st)

Sport
- Country: Canada
- Sport: Speed skating
Medal record
Men's speed skating
Representing Canada
Olympic Games
| Gold medal – first place | 2010 Vancouver | Team pursuit |
World Championships
| Silver medal – second place | 2011 Inzell | Team pursuit |
| Bronze medal – third place | 2011 Inzell | 1500 m |

Lucas Makowsky (born May 30, 1987) is a Canadian speed skater. He started speed skating at six and went on to rank 1st in Canada in the 5000 m and 10000 m for the 2008–09 season.

He competed for Canada at the 2010 Winter Olympics in the 1500 m, 5000 m, and team pursuit. On February 27, he won a gold medal in the team pursuit along with Denny Morrison and Mathieu Giroux. He also competed in the 2014 Winter Olympics in Sochi with Giroux and Morrison, achieving fourth place, losing to Poland in the bronze-medal round.
