= Lee Jong-woo =

South Korean speed skater

Personal information
- Born: 7 July 1985 (age 40) South Korea
- Height: 1.78 m (5 ft 10 in)
- Weight: 70 kg (150 lb; 11 st)

Sport
- Country: South Korea
- Sport: Speed skating

Korean name
- Hangul: 이종우
- RR: I Jongu
- MR: I Chongu

Lee Jong-woo (born 7 July 1985) is a speed skater who competes for South Korea.

== Career ==
At the 2006 Winter Olympics in Turin he finished 14th overall in the 1500 with a time of 1:48.11. At the 2010 Winter Olympics in Vancouver he finished 22nd overall in the 1500 with a time of 1:49.00.

== Personal bests ==
Event	Time	Date
500 m	35.82	11 October 2008
1000 m	1:08.25	7 March 2009
1500 m	1:44.83	6 March 2009
3000 m	3:56.66	19 September 2009
5000 m	7:09.74	20 December 2005
10000 m	15:14.60	21 December 2004

Last updated 20 February 2010.
