= Ha Hong-seon =

South Korean speed skater (born 1991)

Personal information
- Nationality: South Korean
- Born: 1 June 1991 (age 34); Seoul, South Korea

Sport
- Sport: Speed skating

Ha Hong-seon (born 1 June 1991) is a South Korean speed skater. He competed in two events at the 2010 Winter Olympics.
