= Canada at the 2010 Winter Olympics =

- IOC code: CAN
- NOC: Canadian Olympic Committee
- Website: www.olympic.ca (in English and French)

in Vancouver
- Competitors: 206 in 15 sports
- Flag bearers: Clara Hughes (opening ceremony); Joannie Rochette (closing ceremony)
- Medals Ranked 1st: Gold 14 Silver 7 Bronze 5 Total 26

Winter Olympics appearances (overview)
- 1924; 1928; 1932; 1936; 1948; 1952; 1956; 1960; 1964; 1968; 1972; 1976; 1980; 1984; 1988; 1992; 1994; 1998; 2002; 2006; 2010; 2014; 2018; 2022; 2026

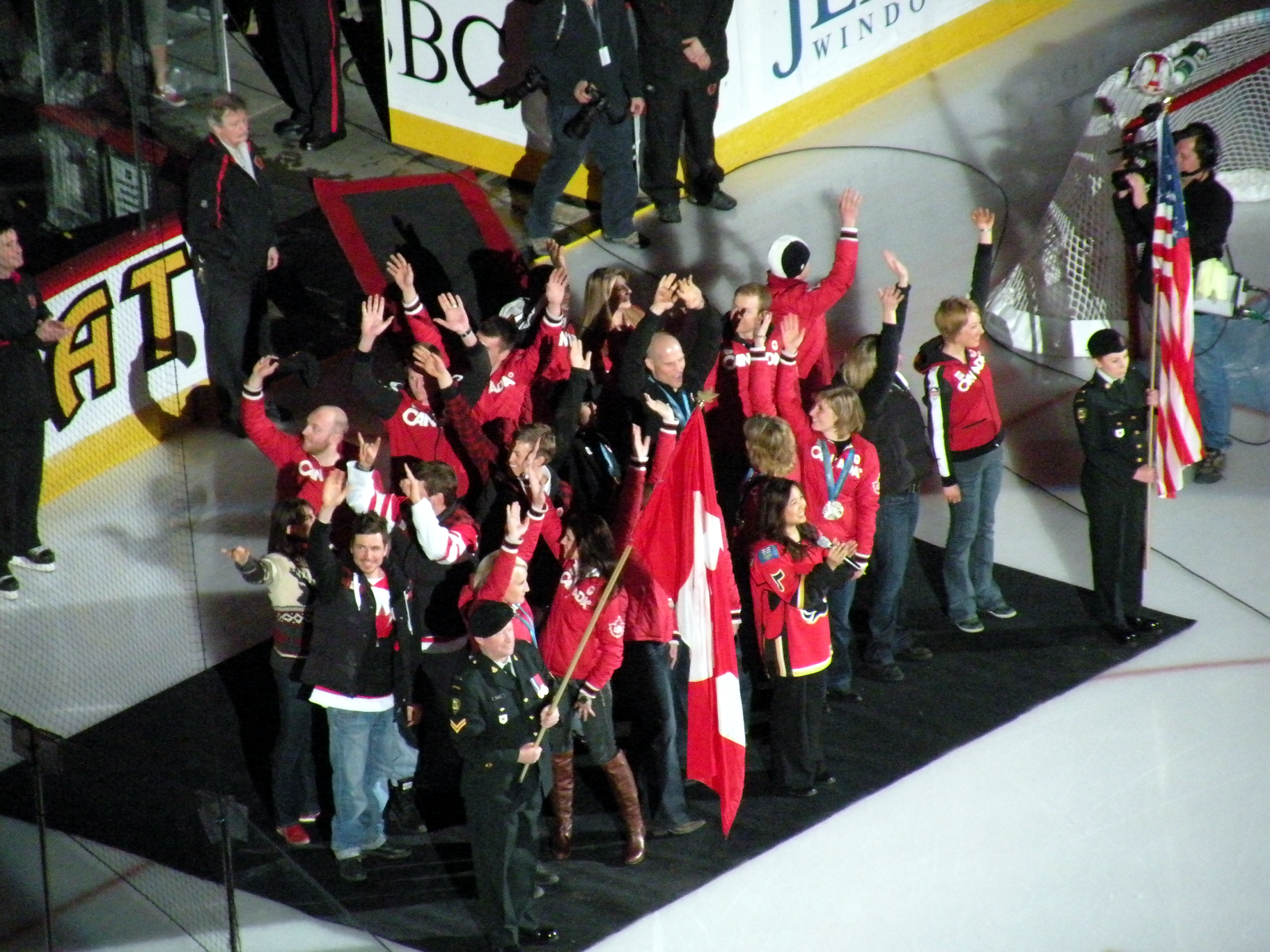
Several of Canada's medallists are honoured prior to a National Hockey League game in Calgary.

Canada hosted and participated in the 2010 Winter Olympics in Vancouver, British Columbia. Canada previously hosted the 1976 Summer Olympics in Montreal and the 1988 Winter Olympics in Calgary. Canada sent a team of 206 athletes (116 men, 90 women), including participants in all 15 sports, and finished with 14 gold medals and 26 in total (ranking 1st and 3rd respectively), surpassing their previous best medal performance at the 2006 Winter Olympics. The 14 gold medals also set the all-time record for most gold medals at a single Winter Olympics, one more than the previous record of 13 set by the former Soviet Union in 1976 and Norway in 2002. This record was matched at the 2018 PyeongChang Games when Germany and Norway tied it, and broken at the 2022 Beijing Games by Norway. Canada was the first host nation to win the gold medal count at a Winter Olympics since Norway at the 1952 Winter Olympics.

Brian McKeever became the first Canadian athlete to be named to both Paralympic and Olympic teams, although he did not compete in the Olympic Games.

== Medalists ==
Medal	Name	Sport	Event	Date
Gold	Alexandre Bilodeau	Freestyle skiing	Men's moguls	14 February
Gold	Maëlle Ricker	Snowboarding	Women's snowboard cross	16 February
Gold	Christine Nesbitt	Speed skating	Women's 1000 metres	18 February
Gold	Jon Montgomery	Skeleton	Men's	19 February
Gold	Scott Moir; Tessa Virtue	Figure skating	Ice dancing	22 February
Gold	Ashleigh McIvor	Freestyle skiing	Women's ski cross	23 February
Gold	Kaillie Humphries; Heather Moyse	Bobsleigh	Two-woman	24 February
Gold	Canada women's national ice hockey team: Meghan Agosta; Gillian Apps; Tessa Bonhomme; Jennifer Botterill; Jayna Hefford; Haley Irwin; Rebecca Johnston; Becky Kellar; Gina Kingsbury; Charline Labonté; Carla MacLeod; Meaghan Mikkelson; Caroline Ouellette; Cherie Piper; Marie-Philip Poulin; Colleen Sostorics; Kim St-Pierre; Shannon Szabados; Sarah Vaillancourt; Catherine Ward; Hayley Wickenheiser	Ice hockey	Women's tournament	25 February
Gold	Charles Hamelin	Short track	Men's 500 metres	26 February
Gold	Guillaume Bastille; Charles Hamelin; François Hamelin; Olivier Jean; François-Louis Tremblay	Short track	Men's 5000 metre relay	26 February
Gold	Mathieu Giroux; Lucas Makowsky; Denny Morrison	Speed Skating	Men's team pursuit	27 February
Gold	Jasey-Jay Anderson	Snowboarding	Men's parallel giant slalom	27 February
Gold	Adam Enright; Ben Hebert; Marc Kennedy; Kevin Martin; John Morris	Curling	Men's	27 February
Gold	Canada men's national ice hockey team: Patrice Bergeron; Dan Boyle; Martin Brodeur; Sidney Crosby; Drew Doughty; Marc-André Fleury; Ryan Getzlaf; Dany Heatley; Jarome Iginla; Duncan Keith; Roberto Luongo; Patrick Marleau; Brenden Morrow; Rick Nash; Scott Niedermayer; Corey Perry; Chris Pronger; Mike Richards; Brent Seabrook; Eric Staal; Joe Thornton; Jonathan Toews; Shea Weber	Ice hockey	Men's tournament	28 February
Silver	Jennifer Heil	Freestyle skiing	Women's moguls	13 February
Silver	Mike Robertson	Snowboarding	Men's snowboard cross	15 February
Silver	Marianne St-Gelais	Short track	Women's 500 metres	17 February
Silver	Kristina Groves	Speed skating	Women's 1500 metres	21 February
Silver	Jessica Gregg; Kalyna Roberge; Marianne St-Gelais; Tania Vicent	Short track	Women's 3000 metre relay	24 February
Silver	Shelley-Ann Brown; Helen Upperton	Bobsleigh	Two-woman	24 February
Silver	Cori Bartel; Cheryl Bernard; Carolyn Darbyshire; Kristie Moore; Susan O'Connor	Curling	Women's	26 February
Bronze	Kristina Groves	Speed skating	Women's 3000 metres	14 February
Bronze	Clara Hughes	Speed skating	Women's 5000 metres	24 February
Bronze	Joannie Rochette	Figure skating	Women's singles	25 February
Bronze	François-Louis Tremblay	Short track	Men's 500 metres	26 February
Bronze	David Bissett; Lascelles Brown; Chris Le Bihan; Lyndon Rush	Bobsleigh	Four-man	27 February

Medals by sport
Sport	gold	silver	bronze	Total
Short track speed skating	2	2	1	5
Speed skating	2	1	2	5
Freestyle skiing	2	1	0	3
Snowboarding	2	1	0	3
Ice hockey	2	0	0	2
Bobsled	1	1	1	3
Curling	1	1	0	2
Figure skating	1	0	1	2
Skeleton	1	0	0	1
Total	14	7	5	26

== Preparation ==
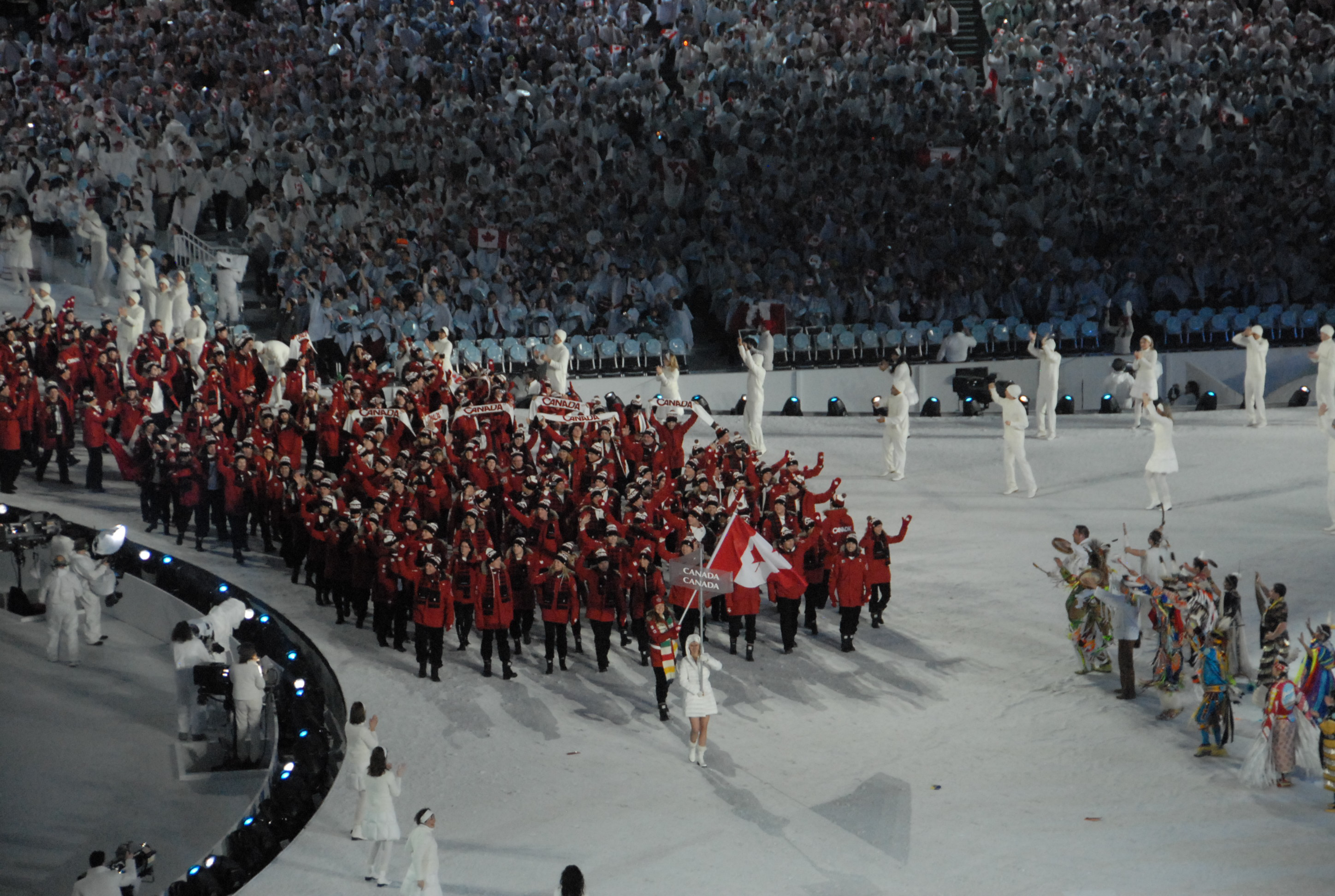
Led by flagbearer Clara Hughes, the Canadian team enters BC Place during the opening ceremonies.

In May 2009, a motion for the Canadian Olympic team to wear seal skin on their uniforms was unopposed in Canadian parliament. The motion read: "That, in the opinion of the House, the government should take advantage of the opportunity provided by the 2010 Vancouver Olympic Games to promote seal products, particularly by studying the possibility of using these products in the making of the Canadian Olympic clothing." The motion was proposed by Raynald Blais of the Bloc Québécois in protest of the European Parliament's passing of a bill to ban the import of seal products. Canadian Olympic Committee chief executive officer Chris Rudge quickly dismissed the idea, saying "It would be inappropriate for us and I think it would be inappropriate to use the athletes as a voice for issues that accrue to other elements to our society."

=== Own the Podium program ===
After Canadian athletes failed to obtain a gold medal in either the 1976 or 1988 Olympics, of which Canada were hosts, the Canadian Olympic Committee pledged to make Canada the top medal winning nation at 2010. They started the Own the Podium program and the Canadian government invested $120 million into the program.

=== Hockey uniform controversy ===
Since 1994, Canadian national hockey team players have worn uniforms that feature the logo of Hockey Canada, the governing body of the sport in Canada. The International Olympic Committee (IOC) does not allow the use of national federation logos, but did not strictly enforce the rule until the 2008 Summer Olympics. Canadian hockey teams used the Hockey Canada logo at the 1998, 2002 and 2006 Winter Olympics, because the IOC does allow an exemption if the nation's National Olympic Committee approves. The Canadian Olympic Committee (COC) chose not to support an exemption. Chris Rudge, the COCs chief executive officer, said "[Hockey Canada] is discontent is that we're not going the extra mile to go for an exemption for [them] ... but it's not our fight, it's the IOC's rule, and Hockey Canada knew this was coming. [...] We got directives on the summer uniforms two years ago, and we shared it then with the winter sports. We told them we didn't have the directives for winter sports at that time, but they had to know it was coming. … We let them know it would be a harder issue than before." Hockey Canada executives, concerned that they would lose money through apparel sales, unsuccessfully protested the decision. Bob Nicholson, president of Hockey Canada, said "The COC is supposed to lead Canada into the Olympics and hopefully this isn't the way the COC is going to lead us over the next 13 months. [...] I just wish they would support us at the IOC level and they did not do that and I don't like that type of teammate." A new design was unveiled on 17 August 2009. According to Nicholson, the new jerseys will only be used in the 2010 tournament, and players will use the old version at other international tournaments.

== Alpine skiing ==
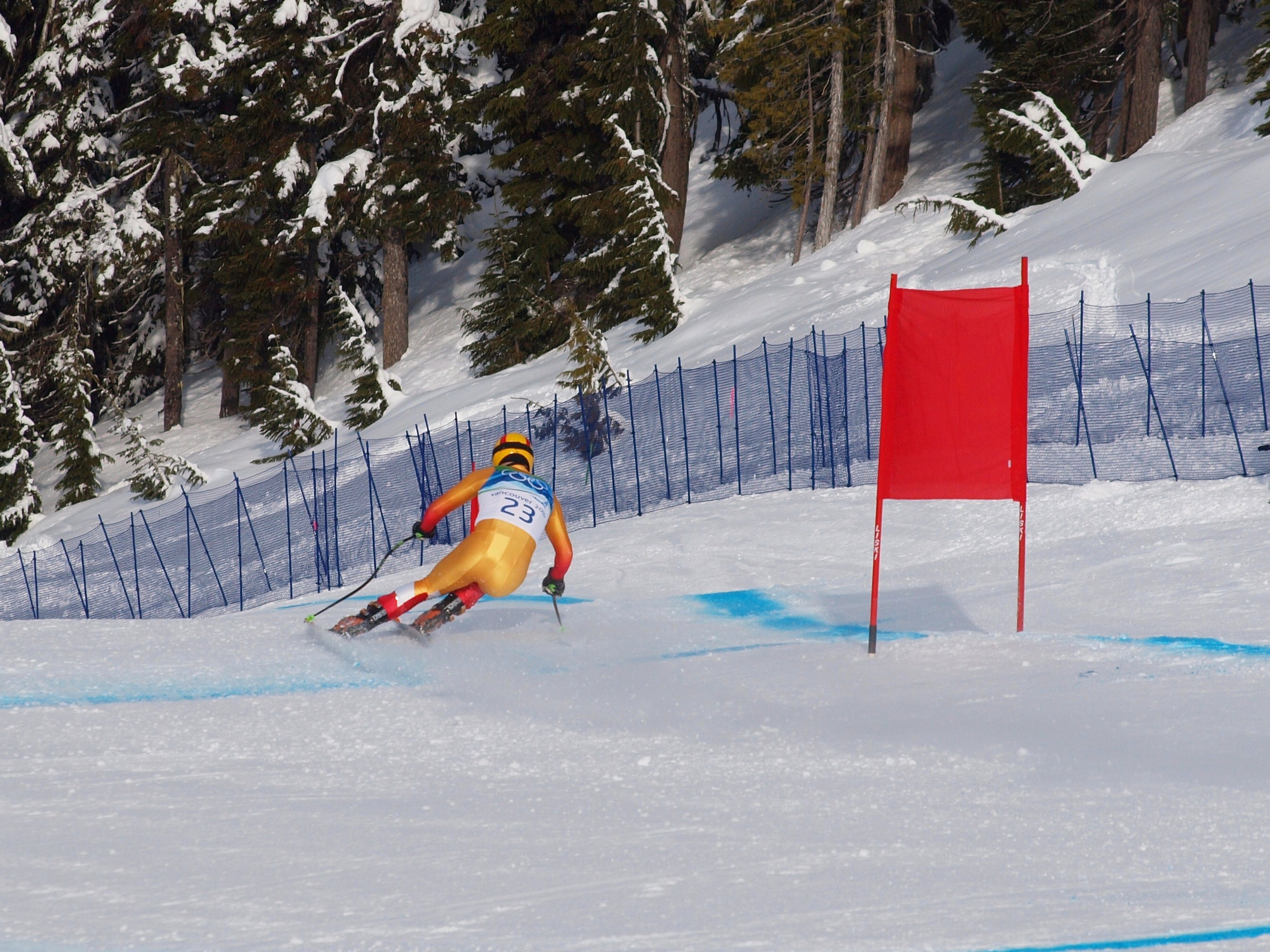
Robbie Dixon competes in the downhill competition.

The Canadian alpine skiing team is guaranteed 14 athletes, which is down from the original 22 (the maximum number a NOC may enter). The International Ski Federation (FIS) announced that the number of overall alpine skiers would be limited to 320, and that some of the guaranteed spots would go to smaller nations, so that there will be a more international field. Canada was originally guaranteed 14 skiers, although the number was later raised to 18, and can still enter a full team of 22 if other athletes meet the qualification standards. Gary Allan, president of Alpine Canada, felt that Canada should be allowed 22, arguing that television coverage and crowd reception will be better. Canada was allowed a team of 19 skiers, which was announced on 27 January 2010. That number was later increased to 22 when other nations were unable to fill their quotas.

Prior to the announcement of the team, several athletes thought to be medal contenders were injured severely enough to keep them out of the Olympics, including 2009 world downhill champion John Kucera, Kelly VanderBeek, François Bourque and Jean-Philippe Roy.

Men

Athlete	Event	Run 1 (DH)			Run 2 (Sl)			Final/Total		
Athlete	Event	Time	Diff	Rank	Time	Diff	Rank	Time	Diff	Rank
Patrick Biggs	Giant slalom	1:21.71	+4.44	44	1:23.12	+2.97	32	2:44.83	+7.00	35
Julien Cousineau	Slalom	49.59	+1.80	19	51.07	+0.34	2	1:40.66	+1.34	8
Robbie Dixon	Super-G							DNF		
Robbie Dixon	Downhill							DNF		
Robbie Dixon	Giant slalom	1:19.20	+1.93	28	1:21.78	+1.63	22	2:40.98	+3.15	24
Jeffrey Frisch										
Erik Guay	Super-G							1:30.68	+0.34	5
Erik Guay	Downhill							1:54.64	+0.33	5
Erik Guay	Giant slalom	1:19.38	+2.11	29	1:20.55	+0.10	2	2:39.63	+1.80	16
Louis-Pierre Hélie	Super combined	1:56.58	+3.43	31	55.00	+4.24	30	2:51.58	+6.66	30
Jan Hudec	Super-G							1:32.09	+1.75	T23
Jan Hudec	Downhill							1:56.19	+1.88	25
Michael Janyk	Super combined	1:59.75	+6.60	43	55.00	+4.24	30	2:51.58	+6.66	30
Michael Janyk	Slalom	49.18	+1.39	11	51.91	+1.18	11	1:41.09	+1.77	13
Tyler Nella	Super combined	1:56.60	+3.45	32	56.05	+5.29	33	2:52.65	+7.73	32
Manuel Osborne-Paradis	Super-G							DNF		
Manuel Osborne-Paradis	Downhill							1:55.44	+1.13	17
Ryan Semple	Super combined	1:56.13	+2.98	26	52.13	+1.37	16	2:48.26	+3.34	15
Brad Spence	Giant slalom	1:20.61	+3.34	37	1:25.63	+5.48	47	2:46.24	+8.41	42
Brad Spence	Slalom	DNF			did not advance					
Trevor White	Slalom	49.53	+1.74	17	57.64	+6.91	37	1:47.17	+7.85	31

Women

Athlete	Event	Run 1 (DH)			Run 2 (Sl)			Final/Total		
Athlete	Event	Time	Diff	Rank	Time	Diff	Rank	Time	Diff	Rank
Brigitte Acton	Slalom	52.11	+1.36	11	53.82	+1.90	21	1:45.93	+3.04	17
Emily Brydon	Downhill							1:47.88	+3.69	16
Emily Brydon	Super combined	1:26.49	+2.33	15	46.27	+2.58	17	2:12.76	+3.62	14
Emily Brydon	Super-G							DNF		
Marie-Michèle Gagnon	Slalom	55.64	+4.89	42	53.87	+1.95	23	1:49.51	+6.62	31
Marie-Michèle Gagnon	Giant slalom	1:17.41	+2.29	23	1:11.48	+0.33	5	2:28.89	+1.78	21
Anna Goodman	Slalom	53.01	+2.26	22	53.03	+1.11	11	1:46.04	+3.15	19
Britt Janyk	Downhill							1:46.21	+2.02	6
Britt Janyk	Super-G							1:22.89	+2.75	17
Britt Janyk	Giant slalom	1:18.13	+3.01	29	1:11.66	+0.51	8	2:29.79	+2.68	25
Erin Mielzynski	Slalom	52.60	+1.85	19	53.49	+1.57	18	1:46.09	+3.20	20
Marie-Pier Préfontaine	Giant slalom	1:18.01	+2.89	27	1:12.50	+1.35	23	2:30.51	+3.40	29
Shona Rubens	Downhill							1:48.53	+4.34	21
Shona Rubens	Super combined	1:26.90	+2.74	17	45.68	+1.99	13	2:12.58	+3.44	12
Shona Rubens	Super-G							DNF		
Shona Rubens	Giant slalom	1:17.38	+2.26	22	1:12.87	+1.72	26	2:30.25	+3.14	28
Georgia Simmerling	Downhill							DNS		
Georgia Simmerling	Super combined	DNS								
Georgia Simmerling	Super-G							1:25.21	+5.07	27

== Biathlon ==
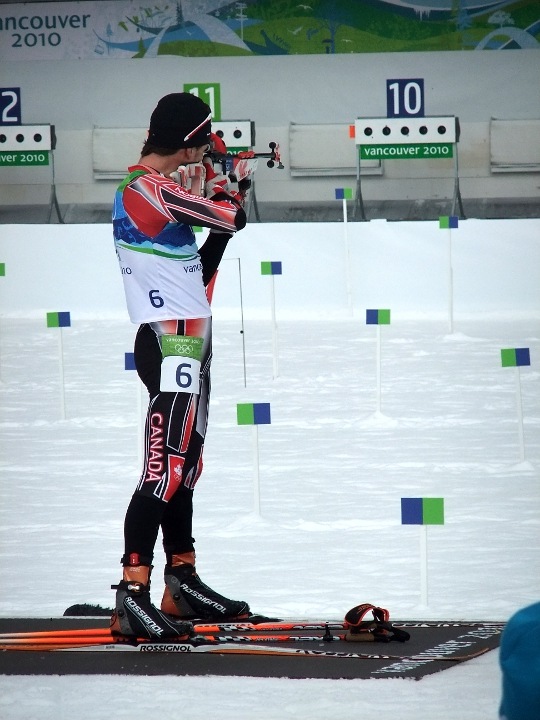
Jean Philippe Leguellec competes in biathlon.

Canada sent eight biathletes to Vancouver. Canada had four individual entries in women's events but only one individual entry in men's events. However, as the host nation Canada was allowed to send a men's relay team. The men's team comprised Jean Philippe Leguellec, Marc-André Bédard, Brendan Green and Robin Clegg. The women's team, meanwhile, comprised Zina Kocher, Megan Imrie, Megan Tandy and Rosanna Crawford.

Athlete	Event	Final		
Athlete	Event	Time	Misses	Rank
Jean Philippe Leguellec	Men's individual	50:47.1	2	13
Jean Philippe Leguellec	Men's sprint	24:57.6	2	6
Jean Philippe Leguellec	Men's pursuit	34:51.9	2	11
Jean Philippe Leguellec	Men's mass start	39:18.5	7	30
Robin Clegg; Marc-André Bédard; Brendan Green; Jean-Philippe Leguellec	Men's relay	1:24:50.7	0+7	9
Rosanna Crawford	Women's individual	49:22.1	4	76
Rosanna Crawford	Women's sprint	23:04.6	0	72
Megan Imrie	Women's individual	47:05.8	4	62
Megan Imrie	Women's sprint	23:17.0	3	76
Zina Kocher	Women's individual	48:19.3	6	72
Zina Kocher	Women's sprint	22:35.8	3	65
Megan Tandy	Women's individual	46:04.3	3	50
Megan Tandy	Women's sprint	22:07.7	0	46
Megan Tandy	Women's pursuit	34:02.2	1	36
Megan Imrie; Zina Kocher; Rosanna Crawford; Megan Tandy	Women's relay	1:14:25.5	1+12	15

== Bobsleigh ==
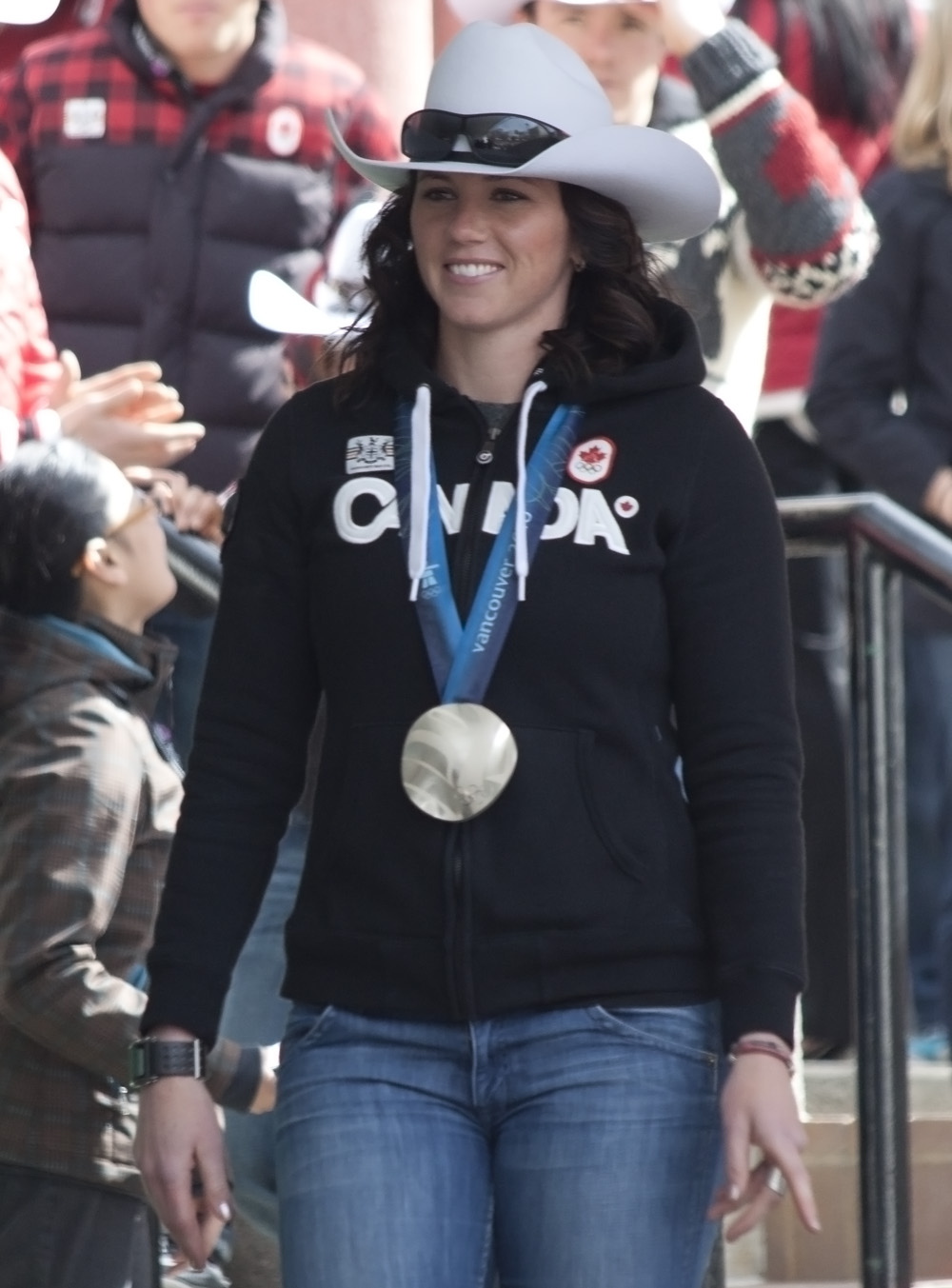
Helen Upperton displays the silver medal she won in the two-woman competition.

As the host nation, Canada was guaranteed an entry in all three events (two-man, two-woman and four-man). Canada's full 12 athlete team was announced on 27 January 2010.

Athlete	Event	Run 1		Run 2		Run 3		Run 4		Total	
Athlete	Event	Time	Rank	Time	Rank	Time	Rank	Time	Rank	Time	Rank
Pierre Lueders; Jesse Lumsden	Two-man	51.94	7	52.12	5	51.87	4	51.94	5	3:27.87	5
Lyndon Rush; Lascelles Brown	Two-man	51.67	3	54.70	23	51.93	6	52.16	8	3:30.46	15
Kaillie Humphries; Heather Moyse	Two-woman	53.19	1	53.01	1	52.85	1	53.23	2	3:32.28	1st place, gold medalist(s)
Helen Upperton; Shelley-Ann Brown	Two-woman	53.50	5	53.12	3	53.34	3	53.17	1	3:33.13	2nd place, silver medalist(s)
Lyndon Rush; Lascelles Brown; Chris Le Bihan; David Bissett	Four-man	51.12	2	51.03	2	51.24	2	51.46	2	3:24.85	3rd place, bronze medalist(s)
Pierre Lueders; Justin Kripps; Jesse Lumsden; Neville Wright	Four-man	51.27	6	51.29	6	51.50	5	51.54	4	3:25.60	5

== Cross-country skiing ==
The 11 athlete team was announced on 22 January 2010. The team consisted of Ivan Babikov, George Grey, Alex Harvey, Devon Kershaw, Stefan Kuhn, Brian McKeever, 2006 gold medalist Chandra Crawford, Daria Gaiazova, Perianne Jones, 2006 silver medalist Sara Renner and Madeleine Williams. Brian McKeever, who is legally blind, competed at the 2002 and 2006 Winter Paralympics in both cross-country skiing and biathlon. He won four gold medals (two at each Games) in cross-country skiing as well as a silver and a bronze in biathlon. He would have been the first athlete in Olympic history ever to compete in the Winter Olympics after participating in the Paralympics. Four more cross-country skiers were announced on 27 January 2010: Drew Goldsack, Brent McMurtry, Gordon Jewett and Brittany Webster.

Men

Athlete	Event	Qualification		Quarterfinals		Semifinals		Final	
Athlete	Event	Time	Rank	Time	Rank	Time	Rank	Time	Rank
Ivan Babikov	15 km freestyle							34:30.0	8
Ivan Babikov	30 km pursuit							1:15:20.5	5
Ivan Babikov	50 km classic							2:10:50.2	33
Drew Goldsack	Sprint	3:44.28	40	did not qualify					40
George Grey	15 km freestyle							35:13.0	29
George Grey	30 km pursuit							1:15:32.0	8
George Grey	50 km classic							2:06:18.1	18
Alex Harvey	15 km freestyle							34:55.6	21
Alex Harvey	30 km pursuit							1:15:43.0	9
Alex Harvey	50 km classic							2:10:49.9	32
Gordon Jewett	15 km freestyle							36:17.9	52
Devon Kershaw	Sprint	3:40.50	24 Q	3:39.9	5	did not qualify			23
Devon Kershaw	30 km pursuit							1:16:23.6	16
Devon Kershaw	50 km classic							2:05:37.1	5
Stefan Kuhn	Sprint	3:38.35	10 Q	3:37.4	3	did not qualify			15
Brian McKeever									
Brent McMurtry	Sprint	3:45.02	41	did not qualify					41
Devon Kershaw, Alex Harvey	Team sprint					18:49.2	4 LL	19:07.3	4
Devon Kershaw, Alex Harvey, Ivan Babikov, George Grey	4 x 10 km relay							1:47:03.2	7

Women

Athlete	Event	Qualification		Quarterfinals		Semifinals		Final	
Athlete	Event	Time	Rank	Time	Rank	Time	Rank	Time	Rank
Chandra Crawford	Sprint	3:47.25	18 Q	3:50.0	6	did not qualify			26
Daria Gaiazova	Sprint	3:46.97	17 Q	3:44.4	5	did not qualify			22
Daria Gaiazova	15 km pursuit							44:35.9	47
Perianne Jones	Sprint	3:54.27	41	did not qualify					41
Perianne Jones	15 km pursuit							45:48.7	57
Sara Renner	Sprint	3:51.79	34	did not qualify					34
Sara Renner	15 km pursuit							41:37.9	10
Sara Renner	30 km classic							1:34:04.2	16
Brittany Webster									
Madeleine Williams	10 km freestyle							27:43.6	51
Madeleine Williams	15 km pursuit							44:11.2	41
Madeleine Williams	30 km classic							1:42:33.7	46
Daria Gaiazova, Sara Renner	Team sprint					18:54.9	4 LL	18:51.8	7
Daria Gaiazova, Perianne Jones, Chandra Crawford, Madeleine Williams	4 x 5 km relay							1:00:05.0	15

== Curling ==
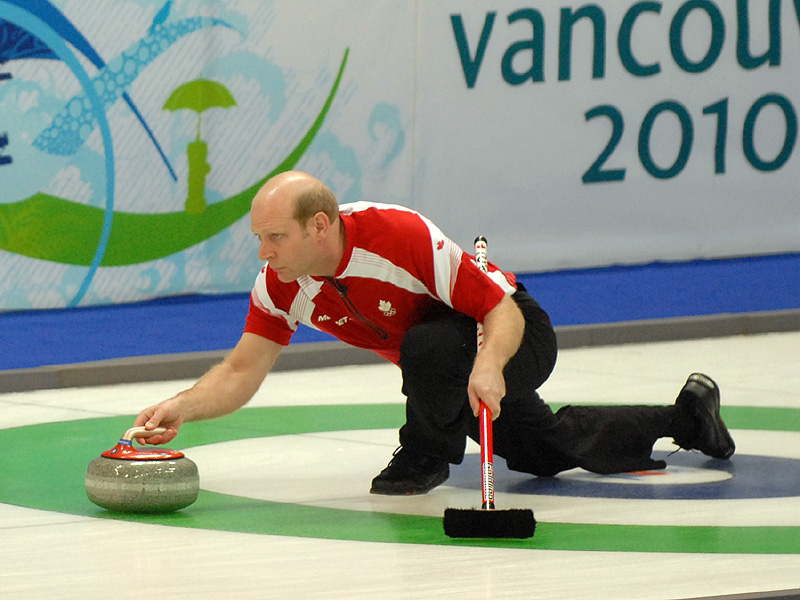
Kevin Martin throws a stone during a curling match.

Canada qualified both a men's and women's team. The representatives were decided at the 2009 Canadian Olympic Curling Trials, held 6–13 December 2009, in Edmonton. Brad Gushue and his team, the gold medallists in the men's tournament in 2006, were unable to qualify for the trials, and did not get the chance to defend their gold medal. In the men's tournament, Canada was represented by the team of Kevin Martin, John Morris, Marc Kennedy and Ben Hebert. This was the second Olympic tournament for Martin, who won a silver medal at the 2002 Winter Olympics. In the women's tournament, the team of Cheryl Bernard, Susan O'Connor, Carolyn Darbyshire and Cori Bartel participated.

Summary

Team	Event	Group Stage										Tiebreaker	Semifinal	Final / BM	
Team	Event	Opposition Score	Opposition Score	Opposition Score	Opposition Score	Opposition Score	Opposition Score	Opposition Score	Opposition Score	Opposition Score	Rank	Opposition Score	Opposition Score	Opposition Score	Rank
Ben Hebert; Marc Kennedy; Kevin Martin; John Morris; Adam Enright	Men's tournament	NOR; W 7–6	GER; W 9–4	SWE; W 7–3	FRA; W 12–5	DEN; W 10–3	GBR; W 7–6	SUI; W 6–4	USA; W 7–2	CHN; W 10–3	1 Q	BYE	SWE; W 6–3	NOR; W 6–3	1st place, gold medalist(s)
Cori Bartel; Cheryl Bernard; Carolyn Darbyshire; Susan O'Connor; Kristie Moore	Women's tournament	SUI; W 5–4	JPN; W 7–6	GER; W 6–5	DEN; W 5–4	USA; W 9–2	CHN; L 5–6	SWE; W 6–2	GBR; W 6–5	RUS; W 7–3	1 Q	—N/a	SUI; W 6–5	SWE; L 6–7	2nd place, silver medalist(s)

=== Men's tournament ===
Standings

Final round robin standings
Team	Skip	Pld	W	L	PF	PA	EW	EL	BE	SE	S%	Qualification
Canada	Kevin Martin	9	9	0	75	36	36	28	14	2	85%	Playoffs
Norway	Thomas Ulsrud	9	7	2	64	43	40	32	15	7	84%	Playoffs
Switzerland	Ralph Stöckli	9	6	3	53	44	35	33	20	8	81%	Playoffs
Sweden	Niklas Edin	9	5	4	50	52	34	36	20	6	82%	Tiebreaker
Great Britain	David Murdoch	9	5	4	57	44	35	29	20	9	81%	Tiebreaker
Germany	Andy Kapp	9	4	5	48	60	35	38	11	9	75%	
France	Thomas Dufour	9	3	6	37	63	22	34	16	7	73%	
China	Wang Fengchun	9	2	7	52	60	37	37	9	7	77%	
Denmark	Ulrik Schmidt	9	2	7	45	63	31	29	12	6	78%	
United States	John Shuster	9	2	7	43	59	32	41	18	9	76%	

Round-robin

Canada had a bye in draws 3, 7 and 11.

Draw 1

Tuesday, 16 February, 09:00

Sheet B	1	2	3	4	5	6	7	8	9	10	11	Final
Norway (Ulsrud)	0	0	1	0	3	0	0	0	0	2	0	6
Canada (Martin) 🔨	0	3	0	2	0	0	0	0	1	0	1	7

Draw 2

Tuesday, 16 February, 19:00

Sheet A	1	2	3	4	5	6	7	8	9	10	Final
Canada (Martin) 🔨	2	0	0	0	2	0	3	0	2	x	9
Germany (Kapp)	0	0	2	0	0	1	0	1	0	x	4

Draw 4

Thursday, 18 February, 09:00

Sheet C	1	2	3	4	5	6	7	8	9	10	Final
Canada (Martin) 🔨	2	0	0	0	3	1	0	0	1	x	7
Sweden (Edin)	0	0	0	1	0	0	1	1	0	x	3

Draw 5

Thursday, 18 February, 19:00

Sheet D	1	2	3	4	5	6	7	8	9	10	Final
France (Dufour)	0	0	2	0	1	1	1	0	x	x	5
Canada (Martin) 🔨	1	3	0	5	0	0	0	3	x	x	12

Draw 6

Friday, 19 February, 14:00

Sheet B	1	2	3	4	5	6	7	8	9	10	Final
Denmark (Schmidt) 🔨	1	0	1	0	1	0	x	x	x	x	3
Canada (Martin)	0	2	0	5	0	3	x	x	x	x	10

Draw 8

Saturday, 20 February, 19:00

Sheet D	1	2	3	4	5	6	7	8	9	10	Final
Canada (Martin) 🔨	0	2	0	1	0	2	0	0	0	2	7
Great Britain (Murdoch)	0	0	3	0	1	0	1	1	0	0	6

Draw 9

Sunday, 21 February, 14:00

Sheet C	1	2	3	4	5	6	7	8	9	10	Final
Switzerland (Stöckli)	0	1	0	0	0	1	0	2	0	0	4
Canada (Martin) 🔨	2	0	1	0	0	0	2	0	0	1	6

Draw 10

Monday, 22 February, 09:00

Sheet B	1	2	3	4	5	6	7	8	9	10	Final
Canada (Martin) 🔨	0	1	0	2	0	1	1	0	2	x	7
United States (Shuster)	1	0	1	0	0	0	0	0	0	x	2

Draw 12

Tuesday, 23 February, 14:00

Sheet A	1	2	3	4	5	6	7	8	9	10	Final
China (Li)	0	1	0	1	0	1	0	x	x	x	3
Canada (Martin) 🔨	4	0	1	0	1	0	4	x	x	x	10

Semifinal

Thursday, 25 February, 14:00

Sheet B	1	2	3	4	5	6	7	8	9	10	Final
Sweden (Edin)	0	0	1	0	0	0	0	1	1	x	3
Canada (Martin) 🔨	0	1	0	1	2	2	0	0	0	x	6

Gold medal game

Saturday, 27 February, 15:00

Team	1	2	3	4	5	6	7	8	9	10	Final
Canada (Martin) 🔨	0	1	0	1	1	0	2	0	1	x	6
Norway (Ulsrud)	0	0	0	0	0	2	0	1	0	x	3

=== Women's tournament ===
Standings

Final round robin standings
Team	Skip	Pld	W	L	PF	PA	EW	EL	BE	SE	S%	Qualification
Canada	Cheryl Bernard	9	8	1	56	37	40	29	20	13	81%	Playoffs
Sweden	Anette Norberg	9	7	2	56	52	36	36	13	5	79%	Playoffs
China	Wang Bingyu	9	6	3	61	47	39	37	12	7	74%	Playoffs
Switzerland	Mirjam Ott	9	6	3	67	48	40	36	7	12	76%	Playoffs
Denmark	Angelina Jensen	9	4	5	49	61	31	40	15	5	74%	
Germany	Andrea Schöpp	9	3	6	52	56	35	40	15	4	75%	
Great Britain	Eve Muirhead	9	3	6	54	59	36	41	11	10	75%	
Japan	Moe Meguro	9	3	6	64	70	36	37	13	5	73%	
Russia	Liudmila Privivkova	9	3	6	53	60	36	40	14	13	77%	
United States	Debbie McCormick	9	2	7	43	65	36	36	12	12	77%	

Round-robin

Canada had a bye in draws 3, 5 and 7.

Draw 1

Tuesday, 16 February, 14:00

Sheet D	1	2	3	4	5	6	7	8	9	10	Final
Canada (Bernard) 🔨	0	0	1	0	0	2	0	1	0	1	5
Switzerland (Ott)	0	0	0	2	0	0	1	0	1	0	4

Draw 2

Wednesday, 17 February, 09:00

Sheet D	1	2	3	4	5	6	7	8	9	10	Final
Japan (Meguro)	0	3	0	0	0	2	0	0	1	0	6
Canada (Bernard) 🔨	0	0	2	0	2	0	0	1	0	2	7

Draw 4

Thursday, 18 February, 14:00

Sheet A	1	2	3	4	5	6	7	8	9	10	11	Final
Canada (Bernard)	0	0	0	2	0	2	0	1	0	0	1	6
Germany (Schöpp) 🔨	0	1	0	0	1	0	1	0	1	1	0	5

Draw 6

Friday, 19 February, 19:00

Sheet A	1	2	3	4	5	6	7	8	9	10	11	Final
Denmark (Jensen)	0	1	0	0	0	2	0	0	0	1	0	4
Canada (Bernard) 🔨	1	0	0	1	0	0	0	1	1	0	1	5

Draw 8

Sunday, 21 February, 09:00

Sheet C	1	2	3	4	5	6	7	8	9	10	Final
Canada (Bernard)	0	0	4	0	2	0	3	x	x	x	9
United States (McCormick) 🔨	0	1	0	0	0	1	0	x	x	x	2

Draw 9

Sunday, 21 February, 19:00

Sheet B	1	2	3	4	5	6	7	8	9	10	11	Final
China (Wang) 🔨	2	1	0	1	0	0	0	1	0	0	1	6
Canada (Bernard)	0	0	1	0	1	1	1	0	0	1	0	5

Draw 10

Monday, 22 February, 14:00

Sheet C	1	2	3	4	5	6	7	8	9	10	Final
Sweden (Norberg)	0	0	0	0	1	0	0	0	1	x	2
Canada (Bernard) 🔨	0	2	1	1	0	0	1	1	0	x	6

Draw 11

Tuesday, 23 February, 09:00

Sheet D	1	2	3	4	5	6	7	8	9	10	11	Final
Canada (Bernard)	0	1	0	1	0	1	1	1	0	0	1	6
Great Britain (Muirhead) 🔨	0	0	2	0	0	0	0	0	2	1	0	5

Draw 12

Tuesday, 23 February, 19:00

Sheet B	1	2	3	4	5	6	7	8	9	10	Final
Canada (Bernard)	0	0	0	1	0	4	0	1	1	x	7
Russia (Sidorova) 🔨	0	1	0	0	1	0	1	0	0	x	3

Semifinal

Thursday, 25 February, 09:00

Team	1	2	3	4	5	6	7	8	9	10	Final
Canada (Bernard) 🔨	1	0	2	0	0	2	0	0	1	0	6
Switzerland (Ott)	0	1	0	1	1	0	0	1	0	1	5

Gold medal game

Friday, 26 February, 15:00

Sheet C	1	2	3	4	5	6	7	8	9	10	11	Final
Canada (Bernard) 🔨	0	1	0	1	0	1	2	0	1	0	0	6
Sweden (Norberg)	0	0	2	0	2	0	0	0	0	2	1	7

== Freestyle skiing ==
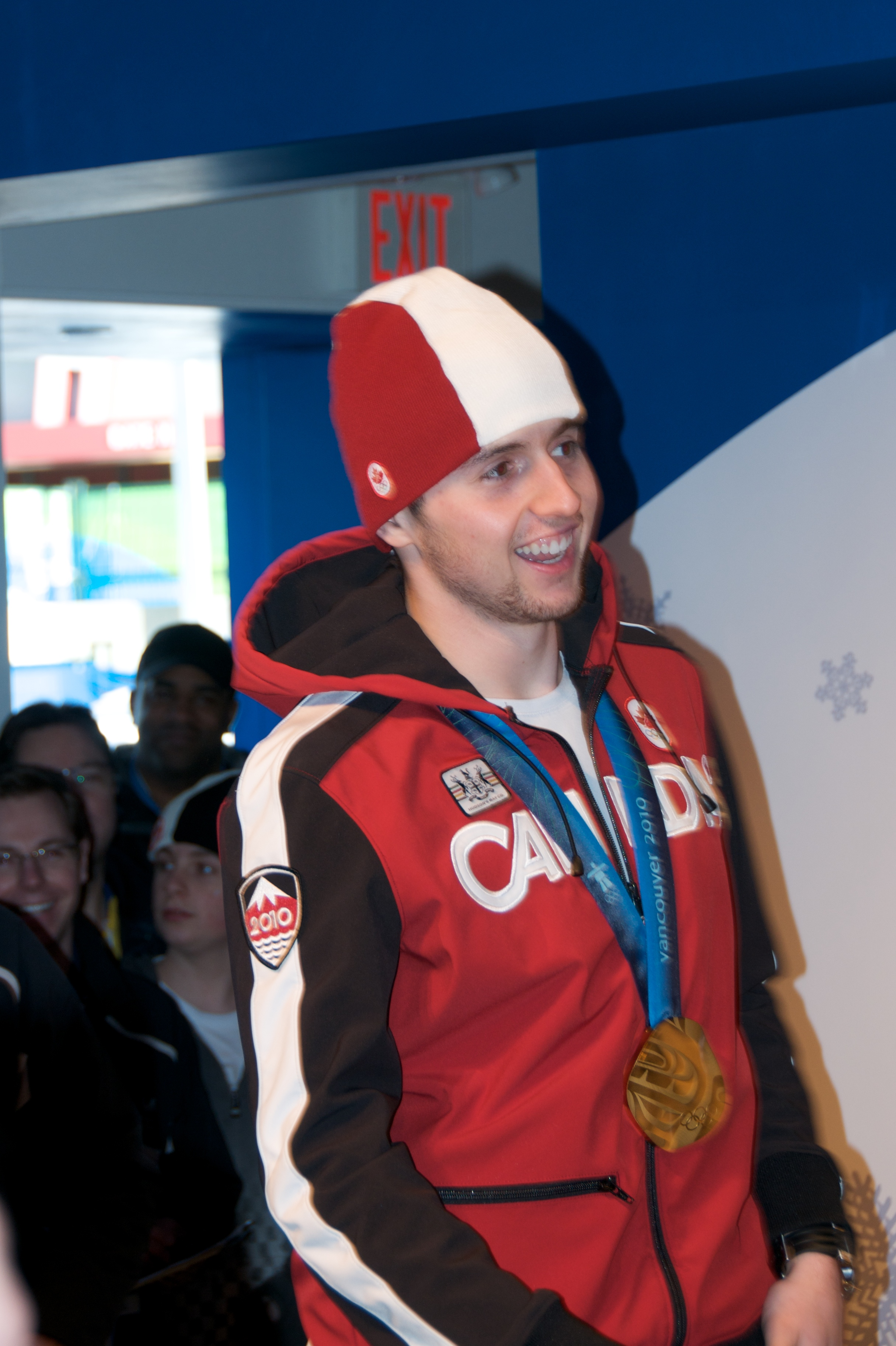
Alexandre Bilodeau displays the gold medal he won in the moguls competition.

The full 18 athlete freestyle skiing team was announced on 24 January 2010. Dave Duncan was originally named to the men's ski cross team, but he broke his collarbone during a training run at the Olympics and was unable to compete. Brady Leman was named his replacement. However, Leman aggravated a broken tibia he suffered in 2009, and also did not compete. Replacing both of them was Davey Barr.

Moguls and aerials

Athlete	Event	Qualifying		Final	
Athlete	Event	Points	Rank	Points	Rank
Kyle Nissen	Men's aerials	233.71	9 Q	239.31	5
Steve Omischl	Men's aerials	233.88	8 Q	233.66	8
Warren Shouldice	Men's aerials	235.93	6 Q	223.30	10
Alexandre Bilodeau	Men's moguls	25.48	2 Q	26.75	1st place, gold medalist(s)
Vincent Marquis	Men's moguls	23.71	13 Q	25.88	4
Pierre-Alexandre Rousseau	Men's moguls	24.36	7 Q	25.83	5
Maxime Gingras	Men's moguls	24.37	6 Q	24.13	10
Veronika Bauer	Women's aerials	160.46	15	DNQ	15
Jennifer Heil	Women's moguls	25.50	2 Q	25.69	2nd place, silver medalist(s)
Kristi Richards	Women's moguls	24.63	4 Q	4.36	20
Chloé Dufour-Lapointe	Women's moguls	23.74	9 Q	23.87	5

Ski cross

Athlete	Event	Qualifying		1/8 finals	Quarterfinals	Semifinals	Finals	
Athlete	Event	Time	Rank	Position	Position	Position	Position	Rank
Davey Barr	Men's ski cross	1:14.98	25 Q	2 Q	2 Q	3	Small Final; 2	6
Christopher Del Bosco	Men's ski cross	1:12.89	2 Q	1 Q	1 Q	2 Q	4	4
Stanley Hayer	Men's ski cross	1:13.74	10 Q	2 Q	4	DNQ		10
Ashleigh McIvor	Women's ski cross	1:17.17	2 Q	1 Q	1 Q	2 Q	1	1st place, gold medalist(s)
Julia Murray	Women's ski cross	1:19.54	14 Q	2 Q	4	DNQ		12
Danielle Poleschuk	Women's ski cross	1:19.02	10 Q	3	DNQ			19
Kelsey Serwa	Women's ski cross	1:17.94	4 Q	1 Q	1 Q	3	Small Final; 1	5

== Figure skating ==
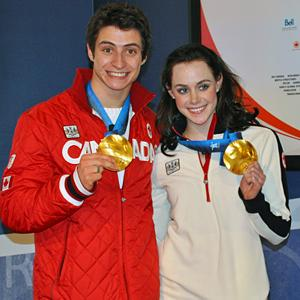
Scott Moir and Tessa Virtue, gold medalists in the ice dancing.

Canada qualified two athletes or pairs in each of the four events for a total of 12 athletes. Participants were decided at the 2010 Canadian Figure Skating Championships.

Athlete(s)	Event	CD		SP/OD		FS/FD		Total	
Athlete(s)	Event	Points	Rank	Points	Rank	Points	Rank	Points	Rank
Patrick Chan	Men's			81.12	7	160.30	4	241.42	5
Vaughn Chipeur	Men's			57.22	24	113.70	21	170.92	23
Joannie Rochette	Ladies'			71.36	3	131.28	3	202.64	3rd place, bronze medalist(s)
Cynthia Phaneuf	Ladies'			57.16	14	99.46	13	156.62	12
Jessica Dubé & Bryce Davison	Pairs			65.36	6	121.75	6	187.11	6
Anabelle Langlois & Cody Hay	Pairs			64.20	7	115.77	9	179.97	9
Tessa Virtue & Scott Moir	Ice dancing	42.74	2	68.41	1	110.42	1	221.57	1st place, gold medalist(s)
Vanessa Crone & Paul Poirier	Ice dancing	31.14	15	48.17	17	85.29	12	164.60	14

== Ice hockey ==
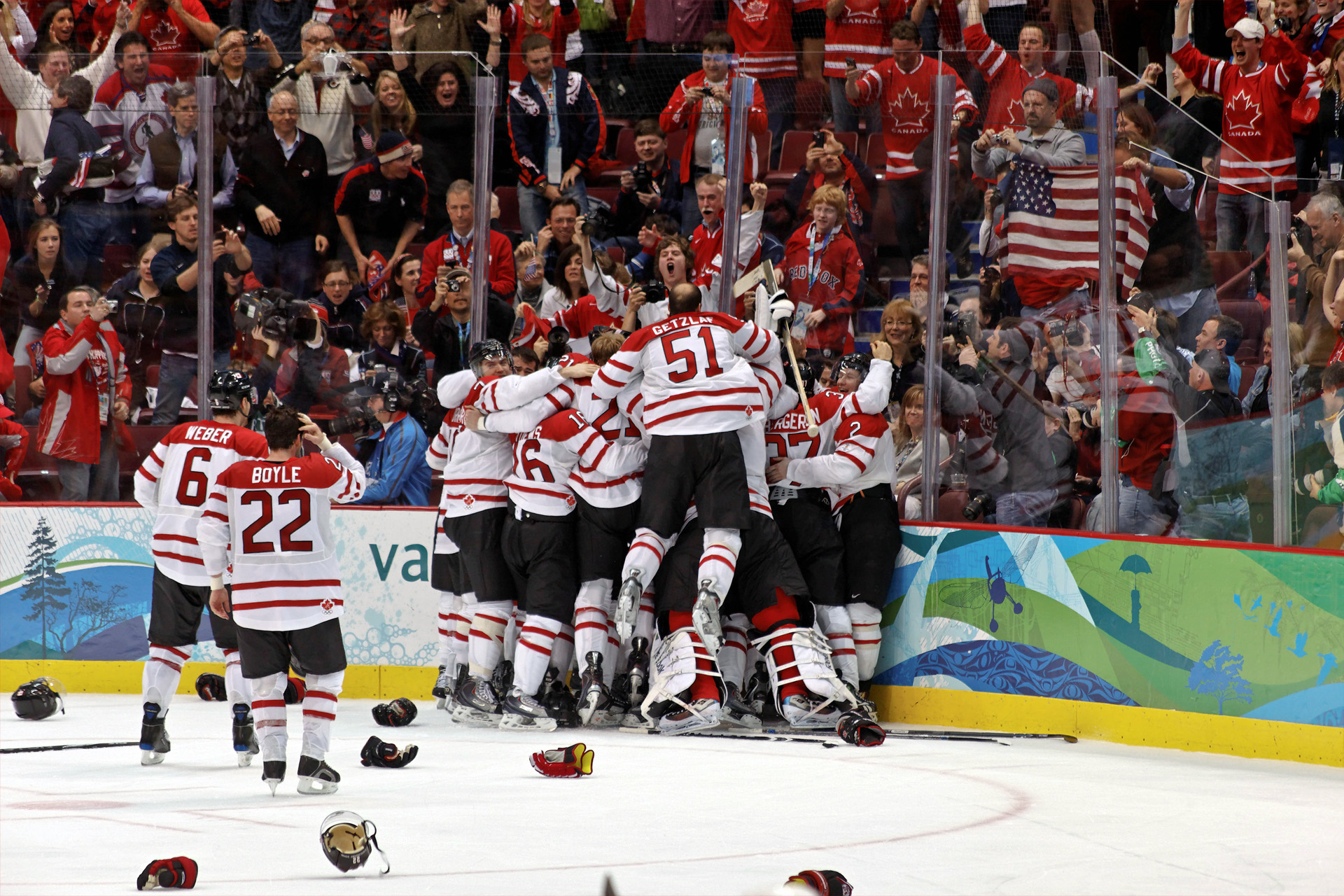
Canada men's national hockey team celebrating after winning the gold medal.

National teams are co-ordinated by Hockey Canada and players are chosen by the team's management staff. The men's and women's national teams both qualified for the 2010 Winter Olympics.

With Vancouver being home to the Canucks, the 2010 Winter Olympics were the first to take place in an NHL market since the league started allowing its players to compete in the games in 1998 in Nagano, Japan.

Summary

Team	Event	Group stage				Qualification playoff	Quarterfinal	Semifinal / Pl.	Final / BM / Pl.	
Team	Event	Opposition Score	Opposition Score	Opposition Score	Rank	Opposition Score	Opposition Score	Opposition Score	Opposition Score	Rank
Canada men's	Men's tournament	Norway; W 8–0	Switzerland; W 2–3 (SO)	United States; L 3–5	2 Q	Germany; W 8–2	Russia; W 3–7	Slovakia; W 3–2	United States; W 2–3 (OT)	1st place, gold medalist(s)
Canada women's	Women's tournament	Slovakia; W 18–0	Switzerland; W 1–10	Sweden; W 13–1	1 Q	—N/a		Finland; W 0–5	United States; W 2–0	1st place, gold medalist(s)

=== Men's tournament ===
A group of about 45 players were invited to an orientation camp in August 2009 (although players not invited could also have been named to the team) and the final 23 man roster was announced on 30 December 2009. The team was coached by Mike Babcock and included assistant coaches Ken Hitchcock, Lindy Ruff and Jacques Lemaire.

Roster

The following is the Canadian roster in the men's ice hockey tournament of the 2010 Winter Olympics.

No.	Pos.	Name	Height	Weight	Birthdate	Birthplace	2009–10 team
30	G	Martin Brodeur	188 cm (6 ft 2 in)	98 kg (216 lb)	6 May 1972	Montreal, QC	(United States) New Jersey Devils (NHL)
29	G	Marc-André Fleury	188 cm (6 ft 2 in)	82 kg (181 lb)	28 November 1984	Sorel-Tracy, QC	(United States) Pittsburgh Penguins (NHL)
1	G	Roberto Luongo	191 cm (6 ft 3 in)	93 kg (205 lb)	4 April 1979	Montreal, QC	(Canada) Vancouver Canucks (NHL)
22	D	Dan Boyle	180 cm (5 ft 11 in)	86 kg (190 lb)	12 July 1976	Ottawa, ON	(United States) San Jose Sharks (NHL)
8	D	Drew Doughty	185 cm (6 ft 1 in)	92 kg (203 lb)	8 December 1989	London, ON	(United States) Los Angeles Kings (NHL)
2	D	Duncan Keith	183 cm (6 ft 0 in)	85 kg (187 lb)	16 July 1983	Winnipeg, MB	(United States) Chicago Blackhawks (NHL)
27	D	Scott Niedermayer – C	185 cm (6 ft 1 in)	91 kg (201 lb)	31 August 1973	Cranbrook, BC	(United States) Anaheim Ducks (NHL)
20	D	Chris Pronger – A	198 cm (6 ft 6 in)	101 kg (223 lb)	10 October 1974	Dryden, ON	(United States) Philadelphia Flyers (NHL)
7	D	Brent Seabrook	191 cm (6 ft 3 in)	100 kg (220 lb)	20 April 1985	Richmond, BC	(United States) Chicago Blackhawks (NHL)
6	D	Shea Weber	193 cm (6 ft 4 in)	103 kg (227 lb)	14 August 1985	Sicamous, BC	(United States) Nashville Predators (NHL)
37	F	Patrice Bergeron	188 cm (6 ft 2 in)	88 kg (194 lb)	24 July 1985	L'Ancienne-Lorette, QC	(United States) Boston Bruins (NHL)
87	F	Sidney Crosby – A	180 cm (5 ft 11 in)	90 kg (200 lb)	7 August 1987	Cole Harbour, NS	(United States) Pittsburgh Penguins (NHL)
51	F	Ryan Getzlaf	193 cm (6 ft 4 in)	100 kg (220 lb)	10 May 1985	Regina, SK	(United States) Anaheim Ducks (NHL)
15	F	Dany Heatley	191 cm (6 ft 3 in)	100 kg (220 lb)	21 January 1981	Freiburg im Breisgau, West Germany	(United States) San Jose Sharks (NHL)
12	F	Jarome Iginla – A	185 cm (6 ft 1 in)	95 kg (209 lb)	1 July 1977	Edmonton, AB	(Canada) Calgary Flames (NHL)
11	F	Patrick Marleau	188 cm (6 ft 2 in)	100 kg (220 lb)	15 September 1979	Swift Current, SK	(United States) San Jose Sharks (NHL)
10	F	Brenden Morrow	180 cm (5 ft 11 in)	95 kg (209 lb)	16 January 1979	Carlyle, SK	(United States) Dallas Stars (NHL)
61	F	Rick Nash	193 cm (6 ft 4 in)	99 kg (218 lb)	16 June 1984	Brampton, ON	(United States) Columbus Blue Jackets (NHL)
18	F	Mike Richards	180 cm (5 ft 11 in)	91 kg (201 lb)	11 February 1985	Kenora, ON	(United States) Philadelphia Flyers (NHL)
24	F	Corey Perry	191 cm (6 ft 3 in)	95 kg (209 lb)	16 May 1985	Peterborough, ON	(United States) Anaheim Ducks (NHL)
21	F	Eric Staal	193 cm (6 ft 4 in)	93 kg (205 lb)	29 October 1984	Thunder Bay, ON	(United States) Carolina Hurricanes (NHL)
19	F	Joe Thornton	193 cm (6 ft 4 in)	107 kg (236 lb)	2 July 1979	London, ON	(United States) San Jose Sharks (NHL)
16	F	Jonathan Toews	188 cm (6 ft 2 in)	96 kg (212 lb)	29 April 1988	Winnipeg, MB	(United States) Chicago Blackhawks (NHL)

Defencemen Jay Bouwmeester and Stéphane Robidas, forwards Jeff Carter, Steven Stamkos and Martin St. Louis, and goaltender Chris Mason were selected as reserves in case of injury during the tournament.

==== Group play ====
Canada played in Group A.

Round-robin

All times are local (UTC-8).

16 February 2010; 16:30	Canada	8–0 (0–0, 3–0, 5–0)	Norway	Canada Hockey Place, Vancouver; Attendance: 16,652

Game reference

Roberto Luongo
Goalies
Pål Grotnes (out 44:29) / André Lysenstøen (in 44:29)
Referees:
(Finland) Jyri Rönn
(United States) Chris Rooney
Linesmen:
(Finland) Stefan Fonselius
(United States) Tim Nowak

J. Iginla (S. Crosby, D. Doughty) (PP) – 22:30	1–0
D. Heatley (C. Pronger, J. Thornton) – 24:27	2–0
M. Richards (P. Bergeron, S. Weber) – 31:06	3–0
R. Getzlaf (S. Niedermayer, J. Toews) – 44:29	4–0
D. Heatley (P. Marleau, D. Boyle) (PP) – 46:43	5–0
J. Iginla (R. Nash, S. Crosby) – 47:36	6–0
C. Perry (E. Staal, D. Boyle) – 51:03	7–0
J. Iginla (R. Nash, S. Crosby) – 58:11	8–0

10 min
Penalties
12 min
42
Shots
15

18 February 2010; 16:30	Switzerland	2–3 (SO) (0–1, 2–1, 0–0, 0–0, 0–1)	Canada	Canada Hockey Place, Vancouver; Attendance: 17,019

Game reference

Jonas Hiller
Goalies
Martin Brodeur
Referees:
(United States) Dennis LaRue
(Sweden) Marcus Vinnerborg
Linesmen:
(United States) Peter Feola
(United States) Tim Nowak

	0–1	9:21 – D. Heatley (P. Marleau, J. Toews)
	0–2	20:35 – P. Marleau (D. Heatley, S. Weber) (PP)
I. Rüthemann (M. Plüss, T. Paterlini) – 28:59	1–2
P. von Gunten (T. Monnet, P. Furrer) – 39:50	2–2

H. Domenichelli (miss)
R. Lemm (miss)
R. Wick (miss)
M. Plüss (miss)
Shootout
(miss) S. Crosby
(miss) J. Toews
(miss) R. Getzlaf
S. Crosby
14 min
Penalties
2 min
23
Shots
47

21 February 2010; 16:40	Canada	3–5 (1–2, 1–1, 1–2)	United States	Canada Hockey Place, Vancouver; Attendance: 16,910

Game reference

Martin Brodeur
Goalies
Ryan Miller
Referees:
(United States) Chris Rooney
(Canada) Brad Watson
Linesmen:
(United States) Thor Nelson
(Canada) Jay Sharrers

	0–1	0:41 – B. Rafalski (R. Suter, J. Langenbrunner)
E. Staal (B. Seabrook, J. Toews) – 8:53	1–1
	1–2	9:15 – B. Rafalski
D. Heatley (J. Toews, S. Weber) – 23:32	2–2
	2–3	36:46 – C. Drury (B. Ryan, D. Backes)
	2–4	47:09 – J. Langenbrunner (B. Rafalski, R. Suter) (PP)
S. Crosby (R. Nash, D. Keith) (PP) – 56:51	3–4
	3–5	59:15 – R. Kesler (Z. Parise) (EN)

8 min
Penalties
6 min
45
Shots
23

Standings

Team	Pld	W	OTW	OTL	L	GF	GA	GD	Pts	Qualification
United States	3	3	0	0	0	14	5	+9	9	Quarterfinals
Canada	3	1	1	0	1	14	7	+7	5	
Switzerland	3	0	1	1	1	8	10	−2	3	
Norway	3	0	0	1	2	5	19	−14	1	

Source: IIHF

==== Final rounds ====
Qualification playoff

23 February 2010; 16:30	Canada	8–2 (1–0, 3–1, 4–1)	Germany	Canada Hockey Place, Vancouver; Attendance: 17,723

Game reference

Roberto Luongo
Goalies
Thomas Greiss
Referees:
(Finland) Jyri Rönn
(United States) Chris Rooney
Linesmen:
(Finland) Stefan Fonselius
(United States) Brian Murphy

J. Thornton (D. Heatley, D. Keith) – 10:13	1–0
S. Weber (M. Richards) – 22:32	2–0
J. Iginla (D. Doughty, E. Staal) (PP) – 23:41	3–0
J. Iginla (E. Staal, D. Boyle) – 28:50	4–0
	4–1	36:34 – M. Goc (C. Schmidt, M. Müller)
S. Crosby (E. Staal, D. Keith) – 41:10	5–1
M. Richards (B. Morrow, J. Toews) – 46:41	6–1
S. Niedermayer – 51:22	7–1
R. Nash (C. Pronger) – 56:28	8–1
	8–2	58:58 – M. Klinge (M. Müller, K. Hospelt)

6 min
Penalties
4 min
39
Shots
23

Quarterfinal

24 February 2010; 16:30	Russia	3–7 (1–4, 2–3, 0–0)	Canada	Canada Hockey Place, Vancouver; Attendance: 17,740

Game reference

Evgeni Nabokov (out 24:07) / Ilya Bryzgalov (in 24:07)
Goalies
Roberto Luongo
Referees:
(United States) Dennis LaRue
(Sweden) Marcus Vinnerborg
Linesmen:
(United States) Thor Nelson
(Slovakia) Milan Novak

	0–1	2:21 – R. Getzlaf (D. Boyle, C. Pronger)
	0–2	12:09 – D. Boyle (D. Heatley, P. Marleau) (PP)
	0–3	12:55 – R. Nash (J. Toews, M. Richards)
D. Kalinin (A. Volchenkov, S. Fedorov) – 14:39	1–3
	1–4	18:18 – B. Morrow (D. Boyle, D. Keith)
	1–5	23:10 – C. Perry (R. Getzlaf, D. Keith)
	1–6	24:07 – S. Weber (J. Toews, J. Iginla)
M. Afinogenov (I. Kovalchuk, D. Grebeshkov) – 24:46	2–6
	2–7	29:51 – C. Perry (E. Staal, R. Getzlaf)
S. Gonchar (E. Malkin) (PP) – 31:40	3–7

10 min
Penalties
10 min
28
Shots
42

Semifinal

26 February 2010; 18:30	Canada	3–2 (2–0, 1–0, 0–2)	Slovakia	Canada Hockey Place, Vancouver; Attendance: 17,799

Game reference

Roberto Luongo
Goalies
Jaroslav Halák
Referees:
(United States) Dennis LaRue
(Finland) Jyri Rönn
Linesmen:
(Finland) Stefan Fonselius
(United States) Thor Nelson

P. Marleau (S. Weber, S. Niedermayer) – 13:30	1–0
B. Morrow (C. Pronger, R. Getzlaf) – 15:17	2–0
R. Getzlaf (C. Perry, C. Pronger) (PP) – 36:54	3–0
	3–1	51:35 – Ľ. Višňovský (J. Stümpel)
	3–2	55:07 – M. Handzuš (R. Zedník, M. Šatan)

2 min
Penalties
4 min
28
Shots
21

Gold medal game

28 February 2010; 12:15	(silver) United States	2–3 (OT) (0–1, 1–1, 1–0, 0–1)	Canada (gold)	Canada Hockey Place, Vancouver; Attendance: 17,748

Game reference

Ryan Miller
Goalies
Roberto Luongo
Referees:
(Canada) Bill McCreary
(Canada) Dan O'Halloran
Linesmen:
(Finland) Stefan Fonselius
(Canada) Jean Morin

	0–1	12:50 – J. Toews (M. Richards)
	0–2	27:13 – C. Perry (R. Getzlaf, D. Keith)
R. Kesler (P. Kane) – 32:44	1–2
Z. Parise (J. Langenbrunner, P. Kane) – 59:35	2–2
	2–3	67:40 – S. Crosby (J. Iginla)

4 min
Penalties
4 min
36
Shots
39

=== Women's tournament ===
In March 2009, the national team staff named 22 players to the 2009 World Championship team, as well as four additional players who would not compete in 2009 but could potentially be included in the Olympic roster. The final roster of 21 players was announced on 21 December 2009. Brianne Jenner, Jocelyne Larocque, Delaney Collins, Jennifer Wakefield and Gillian Ferrari were included in the centralized roster, but were cut before the Olympics. The team, which includes 14 Olympic veterans and seven players making their Olympic debut, is coached by Melody Davidson.

Roster

The following is the Canadian roster in the women's ice hockey tournament of the 2010 Winter Olympics.

Head Coach: (Canada) Melody Davidson

No.	Position	Name	Height (cm)	Weight (kg)	Birthdate	Birthplace	2009–10 team
32	G	Charline Labonté	175	78	15 October 1982	Boisbriand, Quebec	McGill Martlets
33	G	Kim St-Pierre	175	70	14 December 1978	Châteauguay, Quebec	Montreal Stars
1	G	Shannon Szabados	172	66	6 August 1986	Edmonton, Alberta	Grant MacEwan Griffins
25	D	Tessa Bonhomme	170	63	23 July 1985	Sudbury, Ontario	Calgary Oval X-Treme
3	D	Carla MacLeod	162	60	16 June 1982	Spruce Grove, Alberta	Calgary Oval X-Treme
4	D	Becky Kellar	170	70	1 January 1975	Hagersville, Ontario	Burlington Barracudas
5	D	Colleen Sostorics	162	78	17 December 1979	Kennedy, Saskatchewan	Calgary Oval X-Treme
12	D	Meaghan Mikkelson	175	74	4 January 1985	Regina, Saskatchewan	Edmonton Chimos
18	D	Catherine Ward	167	61	27 February 1987	Montreal, Quebec	McGill Martlets
2	F	Meghan Agosta	167	66	12 February 1987	Ruthven, Ontario	Mercyhurst Lakers
10	F	Gillian Apps	182	78	2 November 1983	Toronto, Ontario	Brampton Thunder
17	F	Jennifer Botterill	175	69	1 May 1979	Winnipeg, Manitoba	Mississauga Chiefs
16	F	Jayna Hefford – A	165	63	14 May 1977	Kingston, Ontario	Brampton Thunder
21	F	Haley Irwin	170	74	6 June 1988	Thunder Bay, Ontario	Minnesota Duluth Bulldogs
6	F	Rebecca Johnston	170	61	24 September 1989	Sudbury, Ontario	Cornell Big Red
27	F	Gina Kingsbury	172	62	26 November 1981	Uranium City, Saskatchewan	Calgary Oval X-Treme
13	F	Caroline Ouellette – A	180	78	25 May 1979	Montreal, Quebec	Montreal Stars
7	F	Cherie Piper	167	75	29 June 1981	Toronto, Ontario	Calgary Oval X-Treme
29	F	Marie-Philip Poulin	167	73	28 March 1991	Beauceville, Quebec	Dawson Blues
26	F	Sarah Vaillancourt	167	63	8 May 1985	Sherbrooke, Quebec	Harvard Crimson
22	F	Hayley Wickenheiser – C	177	77	12 August 1978	Shaunavon, Saskatchewan	Eskilstuna Linden

==== Group play ====
Canada played in Group A.

Round-robin

All times are local (UTC-8).

13 February 2010; 17:00	Canada	18–0 (7–0, 6–0, 5–0)	Slovakia	Canada Hockey Place, Vancouver; Attendance: 16,496

Game reference

Kim St-Pierre
Goalies
Zuzana Tomčíková
Referee:
Joy Tottman (Great Britain)

Irwin (Vaillancourt, Johnston) – 1:39	1–0
Bonhomme (Hefford, MacLeod) – 3:06	2–0
Agosta (Ouellette, Wickenheiser) (PP) – 5:38	3–0
MacLeod (Bonhomme, Ouellette) – 8:21	4–0
Agosta (Kellar, Sostorics) – 11:34	5–0
Kingsbury (Piper, Apps) – 15:09	6–0
Sostorics (Hefford, Agosta) – 16:20	7–0
Vaillancourt (Johnston) – 23:42	8–0
Poulin (PP) – 27:21	9–0
Agosta (Hefford, Ouellette) – 30:19	10–0
Hefford (Wickenheiser) (SH) – 32:00	11–0
Ouellette (Apps, Sostorics) (SH) – 32:44	12–0
MacLeod (Poulin, Sostorics) – 36:42	13–0
Hefford (Agosta, MacLeod) – 44:23	14–0
Irwin (Vaillancourt, Ward) – 44:37	15–0
Piper (Wickenheiser) – 46:54	16–0
Hefford (Ouellette, Kellar) – 51:03	17–0
Kingsbury (Botterill) – 52:52	18–0

10 min
Penalties
12 min
67
Shots
9

15 February 2010; 14:30	Switzerland	1–10 (0–2, 1–3, 0–5)	Canada	UBC Winter Sports Centre, Vancouver; Attendance: 5,413

Game reference

Florence Schelling (out 51:55)
Dominique Slongo (in 51:55)
Goalies
Shannon Szabados
Referee:
Nicole Hertrich (Germany)

	0–1	6:27 – Apps (Kingsbury, Piper) (PP)
	0–2	14:25 – Vaillancourt (Johnston)
	0–3	22:19 – Piper (Wickenheiser)
	0–4	28:08 – Agosta (Ward, Ouellette)
	0–5	31:15 – Agosta (Ouellette, Hefford)
Leimgruber (Lehmann, S. Marty) – 39:46	1–5
	1–6	40:54 – Hefford (Wickenheiser) (SH)
	1–7	49:08 – Ward
	1–8	49:27 – Poulin
	1–9	50:43 – Johnston (Vaillancourt, Kellar)
	1–10	51:55 – Wickenheiser (Piper, Apps)

8 min
Penalties
10 min
12
Shots
62

17 February 2010; 14:30	Canada	13–1 (5–0, 7–0, 1–1)	Sweden	UBC Winter Sports Centre, Vancouver; Attendance: 5,483

Game reference

Kim St-Pierre (out 40:00) / Charline Labonté (in 40:00)
Goalies
Kim Martin (out 28:47) / Sara Grahn (in 28:47)
Referee:
Leah Wrazidlo (United States)

Agosta (Piper, Ouellette) – 06:58	1–0
Poulin (Agosta, Wickenheiser) – 09:16	2–0
Piper (Wickenheiser, Sostorics) – 13:00	3–0
Vaillancourt (Johnston, Sostorics) – 15:27	4–0
Bonhomme (Agosta) – 15:57	5–0
Agosta (Hefford) – 21:06	6–0
Hefford (Ouellette, Kellar) – 25:36	7–0
Wickenheiser (Apps) – 25:14	8–0
Apps (Irwin, Piper) – 26:13	9–0
Agosta (Ouellette) (PP) – 27:59	10–0
Piper (Wickenheiser) – 29:17	11–0
Irwin (Vaillancourt, Ward) (PP) – 31:43	12–0
Apps (MacLeod, Wickenheiser) – 47:43	13–0
	13–1	52:16 – Timglas (Jordansson, Rooth) (PP)

8 min
Penalties
16 min
52
Shots
13

Standings

Team	Pld	W	OTW	OTL	L	GF	GA	GD	Pts	Qualification
Canada	3	3	0	0	0	41	2	+39	9	Semifinals
Sweden	3	2	0	0	1	10	15	−5	6	Semifinals
Switzerland	3	1	0	0	2	6	15	−9	3	5–8th classification
Slovakia	3	0	0	0	3	4	29	−25	0	5–8th classification

Source: ESPN

==== Final rounds ====
Semifinal

22 February 2010; 17:00	Finland	0–5 (0–2, 0–1, 0–2)	Canada	Canada Hockey Place, Vancouver; Attendance: 16,324

Game reference

Noora Räty
Goalies
Shannon Szabados
Referee:
Nicole Hertrich (Canada)

0–1	5:22 – Piper (Agosta, Hefford)
0–2	14:36 – Irwin
0–3	36:21 – Agosta (Bonhomme, Hefford)
0–4	44:23 – Irwin (Johnston, Vaillancourt)
0–5	58:57 – Ouellette (Poulin) (SH)

12 min
Penalties
10 min
11
Shots
50

Gold medal game

25 February 2010; 15:30	(gold) Canada	2–0 (2–0, 0–0, 0–0)	United States (silver)	Canada Hockey Place, Vancouver; Attendance: 16,805

Game reference
Shannon Szabados	Goalies	Jessie Vetter	Referee: Aina Høve (Norway)
Poulin (Botterill) – 13:55 / 1–0; Poulin (Agosta) – 16:50 / 2–0			Referee: Aina Høve (Norway)
12 min	Penalties	10 min	Referee: Aina Høve (Norway)
18	Shots	21	Referee: Aina Høve (Norway)

== Luge ==
Canada's Olympic luge team, announced on 19 December 2009, in Whistler, British Columbia, consisted of ten athletes: six individual competitors and two teams for the doubles event. The women's team consisted of Alex Gough, Regan Lauscher and Meaghan Simister. The men's singles team will comprise Sam Edney, Jeff Christie and Ian Cockerline. For the men's doubles event, two teams participated: Chris & Mike Moffat; and Tristan Walker & Justin Snith. The Fast Track Group, the title sponsor of the team, announced that they would give $1 million (which would be split between the athlete and Canadian Luge Federation) to any athlete that won a gold medal. The company also offered $50,000 for a silver and $5,000 for a bronze.

Athlete(s)	Event	Run 1	Run 2	Run 3	Run 4	Total	
Athlete(s)	Event	Time	Time	Time	Time	Time	Rank
Sam Edney	Men's	48.754	48.793	48.920	48.373	3:14.840	7
Jeff Christie	Men's	48.881	48.904	49.308	48.370	3:15.823	14
Ian Cockerline	Men's	49.033	49.132	49.297	48.781	3:16.243	20
Alex Gough	Women's	42.275	42.411	42.346	42.359	2:49.391	18
Regan Lauscher	Women's	42.368	42.289	42.211	42.153	2:49.021	15
Meaghan Simister	Women's	42.524	42.497	42.787	42.662	2:50.470	25
Chris Moffat & Mike Moffat	Doubles	41.675	41.723			1:23.398	7
Tristan Walker & Justin Snith	Doubles	42.100	42.120			1:24.220	15

== Nordic combined ==
Canada sent a single athlete, Jason Myslicki, to compete in the Nordic combined.

Athlete	Event	Ski jumping		Cross-country		
Athlete	Event	Points	Rank	Deficit	Time	Rank
Jason Myslicki	Large hill/10 km	69.3	42	3:51	27:02.4	44
Jason Myslicki	Normal hill/10 km	93.0	43	2:50	30:10.7	45

Note: 'Deficit' refers to the amount of time behind the leader a competitor began the cross-country portion of the event. Italicized numbers show the final deficit from the winner's finishing time.

== Short track speed skating ==
As the host nation, Canada can send a full team of five men and five women for short track speed skating. Charles Hamelin finished third overall at the 2009 World Short Track Speed Skating Championships and was guaranteed a spot in the 2010 team by Speed Skating Canada. At the Canadian short-track speedskating trials, Jessica Gregg, Marianne St-Gelais, Kalyna Roberge and Tania Vicent earned spots on the women's team and Olivier Jean and Guillaume Bastille earned spots on the men's team with their performances. Valérie Maltais and François Hamelin were added to the women's and men's teams respectively as discretionary picks by the coaches. François-Louis Tremblay was unable to participate in the trials due to an ankle injury, but was given a bye and was named to the team. The number of skaters that will participate in each event will be determined by the team's performances at the first three World Cup events for the 2009–10 season.

Men

Athlete	Event	Heat		Quarterfinal		Semifinal		Final	
Athlete	Event	Time	Rank	Time	Rank	Time	Rank	Time	Rank
François Hamelin	1000m	1:25.714	1 Q	1:25.037	2 Q	1:45.324	3 ADV	1:25.206	5
Charles Hamelin	500m	41.463	1 Q	40.770	1 Q	40.964	1 Q	40.981	1st place, gold medalist(s)
Charles Hamelin	1000m	1:25.256	1 Q	1:25.300	1 Q	1:25.062	2 Q	1:24.329	4
Charles Hamelin	1500m	2:16.153	2 Q			2:11.225	3 q	Final B 2:11.225	7
François-Louis Tremblay	500m	41.397	1 Q	41.326	1 Q	41.515	2 Q	46.366	3rd place, bronze medalist(s)
Olivier Jean	500m	41.737	2 Q	41.275	2 Q	DQ		did not advance	9
Olivier Jean	1500m	2:14.279	1 Q			2:32.358	5 ADV	2:14.279	4
Guillaume Bastille	1500m	DQ		did not advance					T34
Charles Hamelin; François Hamelin; François-Louis Tremblay; Olivier Jean; Guillaume Bastille	5000m relay					6:43.610	2 Q	6:44.224	1st place, gold medalist(s)

Women

Athlete	Event	Heat		Quarterfinal		Semifinal		Final	
Athlete	Event	Time	Rank	Time	Rank	Time	Rank	Time	Rank
Jessica Gregg	500m	44.009	2 Q	43.956	2 Q	43.854	1 Q	44.204	4
Jessica Gregg	1000m	1:32.565	1 Q	1:30.207	2 Q	1:33.139	4 q	Final B 1:32.333	5
Marianne St-Gelais	500m	44.708	1 Q	44.316	1 Q	43.241	2 Q	43.707	Silver medal
Valérie Maltais	1500m	2:30.321	3 Q			2:23.722	5	did not advance	14
Kalyna Roberge	500m	44.254	2 Q	44.143	2 Q	43.633	3 q	Final B 43.633	6
Kalyna Roberge	1000m	1:31.033	1 Q	1:31.479	2 Q	1:30.736	3 q	Final B 1:32.122	6
Kalyna Roberge	1500m	2:23.619	2 Q			2:47.998	5	did not advance	13
Tania Vicent	1000m	1:37.561	2 Q	DQ		did not advance			17
Tania Vicent	1500m	2:24.100	2 Q			2:24.742	2 Q	2:23.035	8
Kalyna Roberge; Marianne St-Gelais; Jessica Gregg; Tania Vicent	3000m relay					4:11.476	2 Q	4:09.137	2nd place, silver medalist(s)

== Skeleton ==
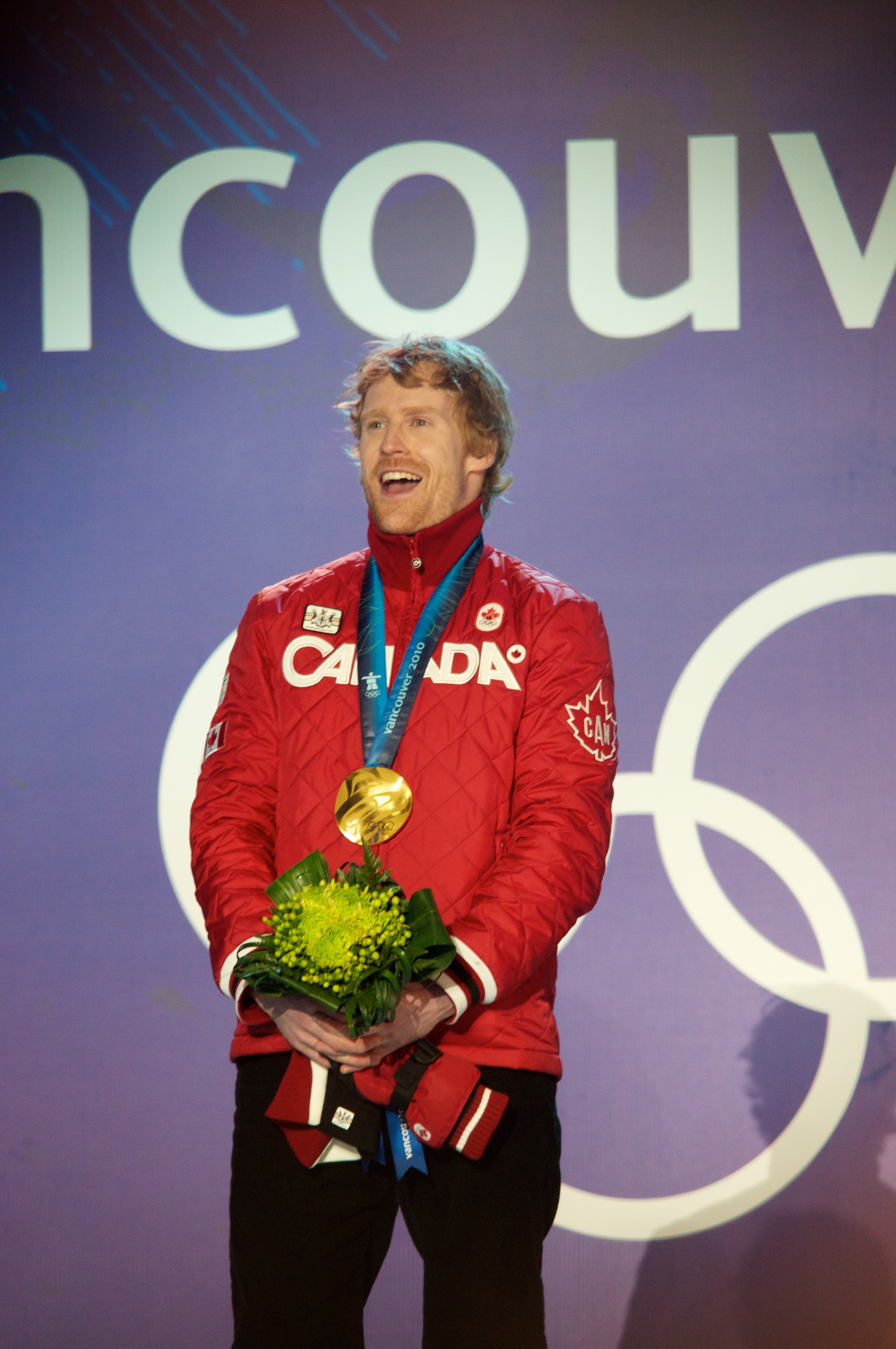
Men's skeleton gold medalist Jon Montgomery.

Canada's full six athlete team was announced on 27 January 2010.

Athlete(s)	Event	Run 1		Run 2		Run 3		Run 4		Total	
Athlete(s)	Event	Time	Rank	Time	Rank	Time	Rank	Time	Rank	Time	Rank
Jon Montgomery	Men's	52.60	2	52.57	2	52.20	1	52.36	1	3:29.73	1st place, gold medalist(s)
Jeff Pain	Men's	53.03	9	53.18	10	53.00	11	52.65	3	3:31.86	9
Michael Douglas	Men's	52.83	5	53.04	7	disqualified					
Amy Gough	Women's	54.14	2	54.78	7	53.92	6	54.17	7	3:37.01	7
Mellisa Hollingsworth	Women's	54.18	5	54.17	3	53.81	2	54.44	11	3:36.60	5
Michelle Kelly	Women's	54.73	12	55.49	13	55.56	18	55.01	14	3:40.79	13

== Ski jumping ==
Canada's ski jumping team comprised Stefan Read, Mackenzie Boyd-Clowes, Trevor Morrice and Eric Mitchell. None of them reached the final.

Athlete	Event	Qualifying		First round		Final		
Athlete	Event	Points	Rank	Points	Rank	Points	Total	Rank
Mackenzie Boyd-Clowes	Normal hill	105.0	44	DNQ				53
Mackenzie Boyd-Clowes	Large hill	111.0	45	DNQ				55
Eric Mitchell	Normal hill	98.5	49	DNQ				58
Eric Mitchell	Large hill	93.0	51	DNQ				61
Trevor Morrice	Normal hill	103.5	46	DNQ				55
Trevor Morrice	Large hill	106.0	49	DNQ				59
Stefan Read	Normal hill	103.0	47	DNQ				56
Stefan Read	Large hill	120.5	36 Q	71.6	46	DNQ		46
Mackenzie Boyd-Clowes; Eric Mitchell; Trevor Morrice; Stefan Read	Team			294.6	12	DNQ		12

== Snowboarding ==
Jasey-Jay Anderson secured an Olympic berth in the parallel giant slalom by winning the event at the 2009 FIS Snowboarding World Championships. The full 18 athlete team was announced on 25 January 2010.

Halfpipe

Athlete	Event	Qualifying			Semifinal			Final		
Athlete	Event	Run 1	Run 2	Rank	Run 1	Run 2	Rank	Run 1	Run 2	Rank
Jeff Batchelor	Men's halfpipe	14.9	18.5	17	did not advance					32
Justin Lamoureux	Men's halfpipe	12.6	35.4	9 QS	36.2	20.2	6 QF	33.8	35.9	7
Brad Martin	Men's halfpipe	11.2	27.5	13	did not advance					23
Sarah Conrad	Women's halfpipe	14.4	31.2	15 QS	17.8	21.4	12	did not advance		18
Mercedes Nicoll	Women's halfpipe	31.1	34.6	10 QS	40.1	28.5	3 QF	34.3	2.9	6
Palmer Taylor	Women's halfpipe	12.9	13.7	26	did not advance					26

Parallel GS

Athlete	Event	Qualification		Round of 16	Quarterfinals	Semifinals	Finals	
Athlete	Event	Time	Rank	Opposition time	Opposition time	Opposition time	Opposition time	Rank
Jasey-Jay Anderson	Men's parallel giant slalom	1:17.97	10 Q	Tyler Jewell (USA) (7); W -1.18	Rok Flander (SLO) (15); W -7.02	Stanislav Detkov (RUS) (11); W -1.72	Benjamin Karl (AUT) (4); W -0.35	1st place, gold medalist(s)
Michael Lambert	Men's parallel giant slalom	1:17.81	6 Q	Stanislav Detkov (RUS) (11); L +12.05	did not advance			12
Matthew Morison	Men's parallel giant slalom	1:17.69	5 Q	Žan Košir (SLO) (12); L +0.25	did not advance			11
Caroline Calvé	Women's parallel giant slalom	1:26.38	20	did not advance				20
Alexa Loo	Women's parallel giant slalom	1:24.22	9 Q	Ankes Karstens (GER) (8); L +0.01	did not advance			12
Kimiko Zakreski	Women's parallel giant slalom	DNF	29	did not advance				29

Key: '+ Time' represents a deficit; the brackets indicate the results of each run.

Snowboard cross

Athlete	Event	Qualifying		1/8 finals	Quarterfinals	Semifinals	Finals	
Athlete	Event	Time	Rank	Position	Position	Position	Position	Rank
François Boivin	Men's snowboard cross	1:32.72	15 Q	1 Q	4	did not advance		12
Robert Fagan	Men's snowboard cross	1:23.06	10 Q	1 Q	1 Q	3 q	Small Final; 1	5
Drew Neilson	Men's snowboard cross	1:22.01	11 Q	2 Q	4	did not advance		11
Mike Robertson	Men's snowboard cross	1:20.15	3 Q	1 Q	1 Q	1 Q	2	2nd place, silver medalist(s)
Dominique Maltais	Women's snowboard cross	1:45.56	20		did not advance			20
Maëlle Ricker	Women's snowboard cross	1:25.45	3 Q		1 Q	1 Q	1	1st place, gold medalist(s)

== Speed skating ==
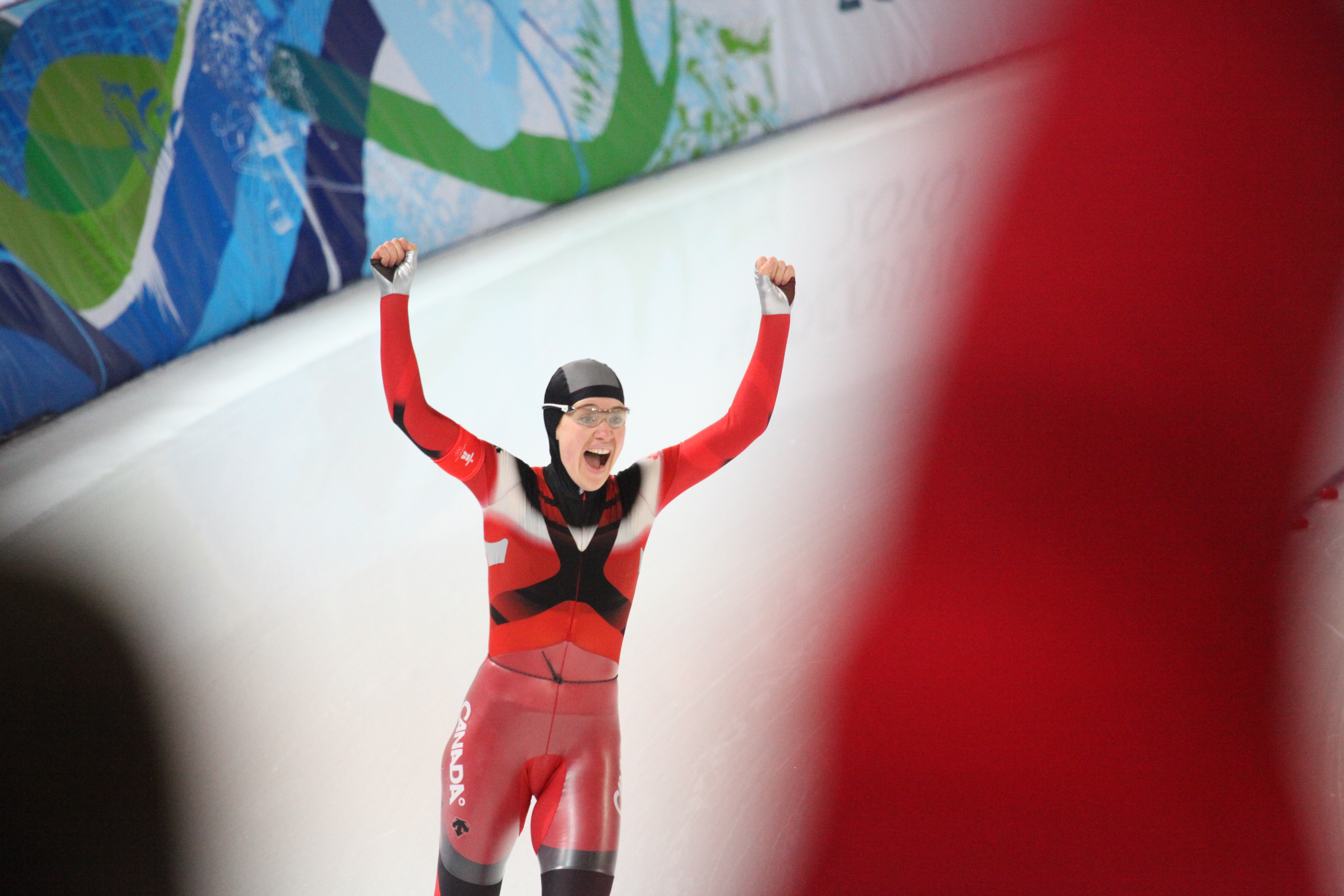
Clara Hughes after winning the bronze medal in the 5000 metres.

Canada's speed skating team consisted of eight men and eight women. Canadian speed skaters participated in every event, with the exception of the men's 10,000 m. The team was named on 11 January 2010.

Men

Athlete	Event	Race 1		Race 2		Final	
Athlete	Event	Time	Rank	Time	Rank	Time	Rank
Mathieu Giroux	1500 m					1:47.62	14
Jamie Gregg	500 m	35.142	9	35.126	8	70.26	8
Mike Ireland	500 m	35.38	17	35.253	13	70.63	16
Lucas Makowsky	1500 m					1:48.61	19
Lucas Makowsky	5000 m					6:28.71	13
Denny Morrison	1000 m					1:10.30	13
Denny Morrison	1500 m					1:46.93	9
Denny Morrison	5000 m					6:33.78	18
Kyle Parrott	500 m	35.57	21	35.767	23	71.344	21
Kyle Parrott	1000 m					1:10.89	24
Kyle Parrott	1500 m					1:52.67	37
François-Olivier Roberge	1000 m					1:10.75	20
Jeremy Wotherspoon	500 m	35.09	5	35.188	12	70.282	9
Jeremy Wotherspoon	1000 m					1:10.35	14

Women

Athlete	Event	Race 1		Race 2		Final	
Athlete	Event	Time	Rank	Time	Rank	Time	Rank
Anastasia Bucsis	500 m	39.879	34	39.876	35	79.755	34
Kristina Groves	1000 m					1:16.78	4
Kristina Groves	1500 m					1:57.14	2nd place, silver medalist(s)
Kristina Groves	3000 m					4:04.84	3rd place, bronze medalist(s)
Kristina Groves	5000 m					7:04.57	6
Clara Hughes	3000 m					4:06.01	5
Clara Hughes	5000 m					6:55.73	3rd place, bronze medalist(s)
Cindy Klassen	1500 m					2:00.67	21
Cindy Klassen	3000 m					4:15.53	14
Cindy Klassen	5000 m					7:22.09	12
Christine Nesbitt	500 m	38.881	13	38.694	8	77.57	10
Christine Nesbitt	1000 m					1:16.56	1st place, gold medalist(s)
Christine Nesbitt	1500 m					1:58.33	6
Tamara Oudenaarden	500 m	DNS					
Shannon Rempel	500 m	39.351	22	39.473	29	78.82	27
Shannon Rempel	1000 m					1:18.174	21
Brittany Schussler	1000 m					1:18.31	25
Brittany Schussler	1500 m					2:04.17	35

Team pursuit

Athlete	Event	Quarterfinal	Semifinal	Final	
Athlete	Event	Opposition time	Opposition time	Opposition time	Rank
Mathieu Giroux, Lucas Makowsky, Denny Morrison	Men's team pursuit	Italy; W -3.97	Norway; W -1.22	United States; W -0.21	1st place, gold medalist(s)
Kristina Groves, Christine Nesbitt, Brittany Schussler	Women's team pursuit	United States; L +0.05	did not advance	Final C Netherlands; W +0.63	5

== See also ==
- Canada at the 2010 Winter Paralympics
