= Snowboarding at the 2010 Winter Olympics – Men's parallel giant slalom =

Men's parallel giant slalom at the XXI Olympic Winter Games
- Venue: Cypress Mountain
- Date: February 27, 2010
- Competitors: 30 from 15 nations

Medalists
1st place, gold medalist(s)		Jasey-Jay Anderson	Canada
2nd place, silver medalist(s)		Benjamin Karl	Austria
3rd place, bronze medalist(s)		Mathieu Bozzetto	France

The men's parallel giant slalom competition of the Vancouver 2010 Olympics was held at Cypress Mountain on February 27, 2010.

== Results ==
=== Qualification ===
Rank	Bib	Name	Country	Qual. Pair	Time	Elim. Pair	Time	Total	Notes
1	10	Andreas Prommegger	Austria	5	37.64	15	38.85	1:16.49	Q
2	3	Sylvain Dufour	France	2	38.18	14	38.61	1:16.79	Q
3	16	Simon Schoch	Switzerland	8	38.13	14	38.82	1:16.95	Q
4	6	Benjamin Karl	Austria	3	38.24	13	39.21	1:17.45	Q
5	1	Matthew Morison	Canada	1	38.18	15	39.51	1:17.69	Q
6	4	Michael Lambert	Canada	2	38.74	12	39.07	1:17.81	Q
7	19	Tyler Jewell	United States	10	38.46	12	39.39	1:17.85	Q
8	13	Daniel Biveson	Sweden	7	38.41	13	39.45	1:17.86	Q
9	15	Mathieu Bozzetto	France	8	38.69	10	39.26	1:17.95	Q
10	5	Jasey-Jay Anderson	Canada	3	39.38	5	38.59	1:17.97	Q
11	20	Stanislav Detkov	Russia	10	38.96	10	39.33	1:18.29	Q
12	24	Zan Kosir	Slovenia	12	39.02	9	39.29	1:18.31	Q
13	23	Aaron March	Italy	12	39.08	6	39.28	1:18.36	Q
14	12	Patrick Bussler	Germany	6	39.30	7	39.19	1:18.49	Q
15	9	Rok Flander	Slovenia	5	38.77	9	39.87	1:18.64	Q
16	17	Chris Klug	United States	9	38.84	8	40.00	1:18.84	Q
17	7	Nevin Galmarini	Switzerland	4	38.99	7	39.87	1:18.86	
18	8	Roland Fischnaller	Italy	4	38.80	11	40.07	1:18.87	
19	18	Marc Iselin	Switzerland	9	40.39	5	38.77	1:19.16	
20	11	Roland Haldi	Switzerland	6	38.53	11	40.98	1:19.51	
21	27	Meinhard Erlacher	Italy	14	40.22	4	39.92	1:20.14	
22	28	Yosyf Penyak	Ukraine	14	40.83	4	40.17	1:21.01	
23	14	Rok Marguč	Slovenia	7	39.27	8	41.82	1:21.09	
24	25	Adam McLeish	Great Britain	13	40.30	3	40.79	1:21.09	
25	22	Izidor Sustersic	Slovenia	11	42.55	3	39.46	1:22.01	
26	26	Ivan Rantchev	Bulgaria	13	40.38	6	42.45	1:22.83	
27	29	Yuki Nofuji	Japan	15	42.42	1	41.46	1:23.88	
28	30	Petr Šindelář	Czech Republic	15	56.49	2	41.28	1:37.77	
29	21	Ingemar Walder	Austria	11	40.68	2	DSQ		
	2	Siegfried Grabner	Austria	1	DNF				

=== Elimination round ===
Round of 16
1	Prommegger (AUT)	DSQ
16	Klug (USA)
9	Bozzetto (FRA)
8	Biveson (SWE)	+0.36
5	Morison (CAN)	DSQ
12	Kosir (SLO)
13	March (ITA)	+2.27
4	Karl (AUT)
3	Schoch (SUI)
14	Bussler (GER)	+22.06
11	Detkov (RUS)
6	Lambert (CAN)	+12.05
7	Jewell (USA)	+1.18
10	Anderson (CAN)
15	Flander (SLO)
2	Dufour (FRA)	+1.65

Quarterfinals
16	Klug (USA)	DNF
9	Bozzetto (FRA)
12	Kosir (SLO)	DSQ
4	Karl (AUT)
3	Schoch (SUI)	DSQ
11	Detkov (RUS)
10	Anderson (CAN)
15	Flander (SLO)	+7.02

Semifinals
9	Bozzetto (FRA)	+3.70
4	Karl (AUT)
11	Detkov (RUS)	+1.72
10	Anderson (CAN)

Finals
4	Karl (AUT)	+0.35
10	Anderson (CAN)
Third place
9	Bozzetto (FRA)
11	Detkov (RUS)	DSQ

==== Classification 5-8 ====
The four quarterfinal losers entered the consolation bracket, where they raced for positions five through eight.

Placement 5-8
16	Klug (USA)	+1.71
12	Kosir (SLO)
3	Schoch (SUI)
15	Flander (SLO)	DNS

Placement 5-6
12	Kosir (SLO)	+0.92
3	Schoch (SUI)
Placement 7-8
16	Klug (USA)
15	Flander (SLO)	DNS
