= Yuki Nofuji =

Japanese snowboarder (born 1987)

Personal information
- Nationality: Japanese
- Born: June 11, 1987 (age 37); Suita, Osaka

Sport
- Sport: Snowboarding

Yūki Nofuji (野藤 優貴, Nofuji Yūki, ; born 11 June 1987 in Suita) is a Japanese snowboarder. He placed 27th in the men's parallel giant slalom event at the 2010 Winter Olympics.
