= Cross-country skiing at the 2010 Winter Olympics – Women's 30 kilometre classical =

Women's 30 kilometre classical at the XXI Olympic Winter Games
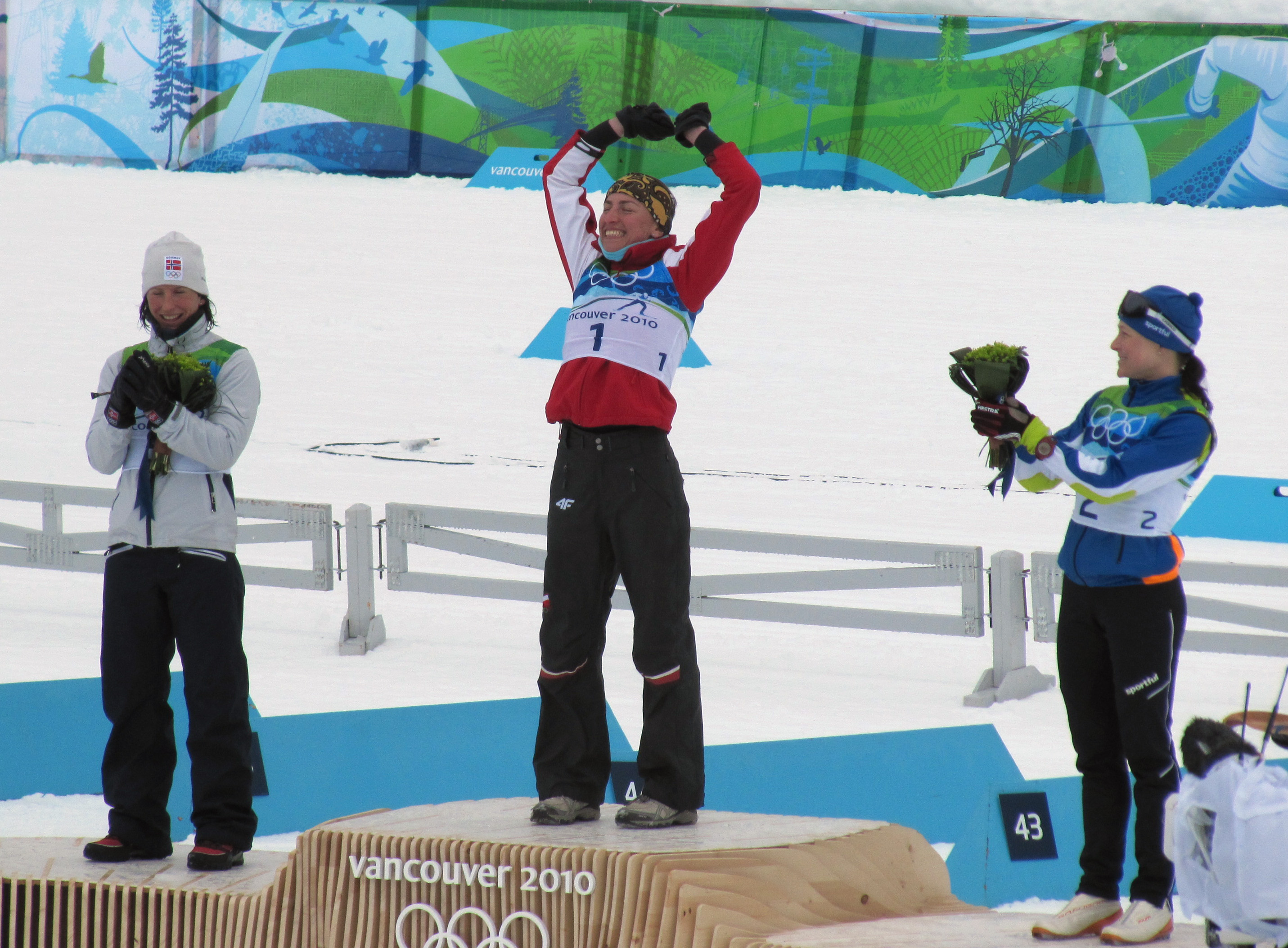
- Medal ceremony for the event. From left: Marit Bjørgen (silver), Justyna Kowalczyk (gold), Aino-Kaisa Saarinen (bronze)
- Venue: Whistler Olympic Park
- Dates: 27 February 2010
- Competitors: 55 from 21 nations
- Winning time: 1:30:33.7

Medalists
1st place, gold medalist(s)		Justyna Kowalczyk	Poland
2nd place, silver medalist(s)		Marit Bjørgen	Norway
3rd place, bronze medalist(s)		Aino-Kaisa Saarinen	Finland

The women's 30 kilometre classical cross-country skiing competition at the 2010 Winter Olympics in Vancouver, Canada was held on 27 February at Whistler Olympic Park in Whistler, British Columbia at 11:45 PST.

== Summary ==
The 30 kilometre has been skated as a mass start event at the World Championships since 2005 and since the 2006 Winter Olympics. Kateřina Neumannová of the Czech Republic was the defending Olympic champion though that event was held in the freestyle technique. She retired after the 2006-07 season and later chaired the organizing committee for the 2009 world championships. Poland's Justyna Kowalczyk, the defending Olympic bronze medallist, was the reigning world champion though that was also in the freestyle technique. The last World Cup event in the 30 km classical took place in Trondheim, Norway on 14 March 2009 and was won by Petra Majdič of Slovenia.

The race was a mass start event where all of the skiers start at the same time.

== Results ==
Majdič, the bronze medallist in the sprint event at these games who also won the last event in this format prior to this race, did not participate in the wake of crashing down a bank, into an unprotected 3 m (9.8 ft) deep gorge and landing on ice and rocks, resulting in five broken ribs and a pneumothorax prior to the start of qualifying for the sprint event ten days earlier. This race also matched up the last four world champions in this event (Zavyalova: 2003, Bjørgen: 2005, Kuitunen: 2007, and Kowalczyk: 2009.).

At the 7.1 km mark, the top three leaders were Størmer Steira (who finished eighth), Jatskaja (who finished 19th), and Kalla (who finished sixth). Kowalczyk, the defending world champion, led at the halfway mark, followed by Saarinen and Longa (who finished 12th). Bjørgen, the 2005 world champion in this event, held the lead at the 22.1 km mark, followed by Kowalczyk and Saarinen, who changed skis at the 25 km mark. Kowalczyk's finish over Bjørgen was the closest in Olympic history, edging out Neumannová's 1.4-second win over Russia's Yuliya Chepalova at the previous Olympics in Turin.

Kowalczyk is the first woman from Poland to win a gold medal at the Winter Olympics and only the second overall, after Wojciech Fortuna's victory in the ski jumping individual large hill event at the 1972 Winter Olympics in Sapporo. Saarinen earned her first and only individual Winter Olympic medal. She was the first Finnish woman to win an individual Olympic medal in cross-country skiing since Marja-Liisa Kirvesniemi at the 1994 Winter Olympics in Lillehammer. 2003 World champion Zavylova finished 23rd while 2007 World champion Kuitunen finished 14th.

Rank	Bib	Name	Country	Time	Deficit
1st place, gold medalist(s)	1	Justyna Kowalczyk	Poland	1:30:33.7	0.0
2nd place, silver medalist(s)	5	Marit Bjørgen	Norway	1:30:34.0	+0.3
3rd place, bronze medalist(s)	2	Aino-Kaisa Saarinen	Finland	1:31:38.7	+1:05.0
4	10	Evi Sachenbacher-Stehle	Germany	1:31:52.9	+1:19.2
5	24	Masako Ishida	Japan	1:31:56.5	+1:22.8
6	3	Charlotte Kalla	Sweden	1:31:57.6	+1:23.9
7	20	Therese Johaug	Norway	1:32:01.3	+1:27.6
8	4	Kristin Størmer Steira	Norway	1:32:04.4	+1:30.7
9	23	Anna Olsson	Sweden	1:33:00.3	+2:26.6
10	22	Karine Laurent Philippot	France	1:33:11.4	+2:37.7
11	6	Marianna Longa	Italy	1:33:19.9	+2:46.2
12	17	Riikka Sarasoja	Finland	1:33:33.2	+2:59.5
13	8	Virpi Kuitunen	Finland	1:33:36.7	+3:03.0
14	35	Aurore Cuinet	France	1:33:58.3	+3:24.6
15	25	Sara Renner	Canada	1:34:04.2	+3:30.5
16	27	Antonella Confortola	Italy	1:34:07.7	+3:34.0
17	26	Stefanie Böhler	Germany	1:34:08.7	+3:35.0
18	36	Oxana Yatskaya	Kazakhstan	1:34:11.0	+3:37.3
19	16	Katrin Zeller	Germany	1:34:18.1	+3:44.4
20	15	Marthe Kristoffersen	Norway	1:34:31.1	+3:57.8
21	38	Tetyana Zavalíy	Ukraine	1:34:32.3	+3:58.6
22	9	Olga Zavyalova	Russia	1:34:46.3	+4:12.6
23	33	Kikkan Randall	United States	1:34:59.0	+4:25.3
24	41	Sylwia Jaśkowiec	Poland	1:34:59.1	+4:25.4
25	30	Krista Lähteenmäki	Finland	1:35:08.4	+4:34.7
26	42	Kateryna Grygorenko	Ukraine	1:35:11.4	+4:37.7
27	11	Kristina Šmigun-Vähi	Estonia	1:35:27.2	+4:53.5
28	54	Paulina Maciuszek	Poland	1:36:31.7	+5:58.0
29	12	Olga Rocheva	Russia	1:37:15.5	+6:41.8
30	55	Madoka Natsumi	Japan	1:37:35.4	+7:01.7
31	32	Li Hongxue	China	1:37:50.4	+7:16.7
32	28	Kateřina Smutná	Austria	1:37:51.3	+7:17.6
33	19	Elena Kolomina	Kazakhstan	1:37:53.0	+7:19.3
34	48	Marina Matrosova	Kazakhstan	1:38:00.6	+7:26.9
35	46	Holly Brooks	United States	1:38:14.5	+7:40.8
36	34	Laura Orgué	Spain	1:38:18.3	+7:44.6
37	14	Olga Schuchkina	Russia	1:38:30.3	+7:56.6
38	29	Alena Sannikova	Belarus	1:38:31.3	+7:57.6
39	37	Eva Nývltová	Czech Republic	1:38:40.1	+8:06.4
40	31	Ivana Janečková	Czech Republic	1:40:13.6	+9:39.9
41	43	Tatjana Mannima	Estonia	1:40:51.3	+10:17.6
42	13	Svetlana Malahova-Shishkina	Kazakhstan	1:41:01.6	+10:27.9
43	51	Lada Nesterenko	Ukraine	1:41:40.1	+11:06.4
44	45	Nastassia Dubarezava	Belarus	1:42:28.1	+11:54.4
45	49	Madeleine Williams	Canada	1:42:33.7	+12:00.0
46	50	Monika Gyorgy	Romania	1:44:03.5	+13:29.8
47	53	Eva Skalníková	Czech Republic	1:44:47.8	+14:04.1
	47	Kornelia Marek	Poland	DSQ	
	7	Valentyna Shevchenko	Ukraine	DNF	
	44	Ida Ingemarsdotter	Sweden	DNF	
	39	Cécile Storti	France	DNF	
	40	Morgan Arritola	United States	DNF	
	52	Laurence Rochat	Switzerland	DNF	
	18	Sabina Valbusa	Italy	DNS	
	21	Kamila Rajdlová	Czech Republic	DNS	
