= Ivan Rantchev =

Bulgarian snowboarder (born 1990)

Personal information
- Nationality: Bulgarian
- Born: March 21, 1990 (age 34)

Sport
- Sport: Snowboarding

Ivan Rantchev (born 21 March 1990, in Sofia) is a Bulgarian snowboarder. He placed 26th in the men's parallel giant slalom event at the 2010 Winter Olympics.
