= Stefan Kuhn =

Canadian cross-country skier and chef (born 1979)

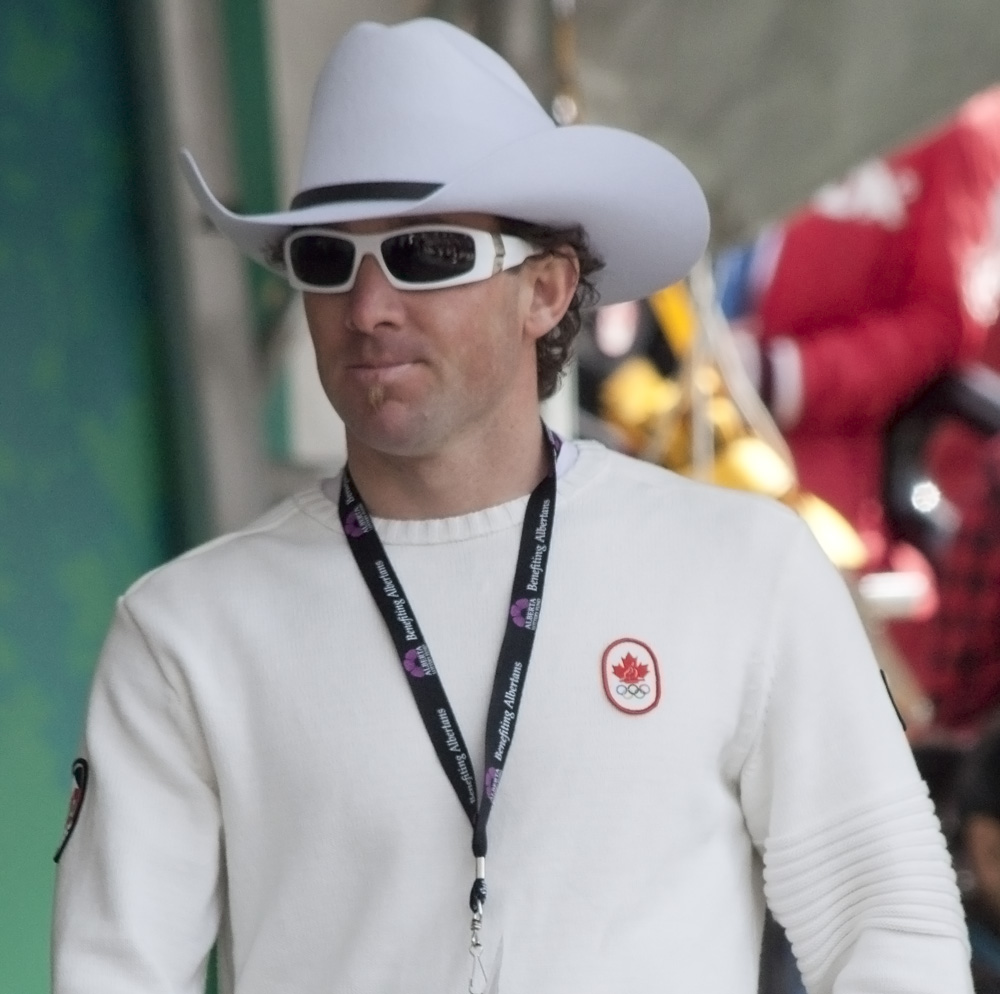
- Kuhn in 2010
- Born: October 1, 1979 (age 45); Banff, Alberta, Canada
- Height: 175 cm (5 ft 9 in)
- Ski club: Canmore Nordic Ski Club

Stefan Kuhn (born October 1, 1979) is a Canadian cross-country skier and chef. Kuhn was born in Banff and competed in various international skiing events from 1998 to 2000, before retiring in 2001 to become a full-time chef. In 2005, while working at a fine restaurant in Edmonton, Kuhn decided to relaunch his cross-country career. He participated in his first World Cup race in December 2005.

Kuhn's best finish in the World Cup is a 15th place in a sprint event in Kuusamo in 2008. He competed in the 2006-07 Tour de Ski, the 2007 World Ski Championships, and the 2010 Winter Olympics. Kuhn currently lives in Canmore and coaches with the AWCA ski team, he also appears at the Paint Box lodge as a guest chef.

He finished 15th in the individual sprint event at the 2010 Games, and holds Canada's best ever male result in this event.
