= Gordon Jewett =

Canadian cross-country skier

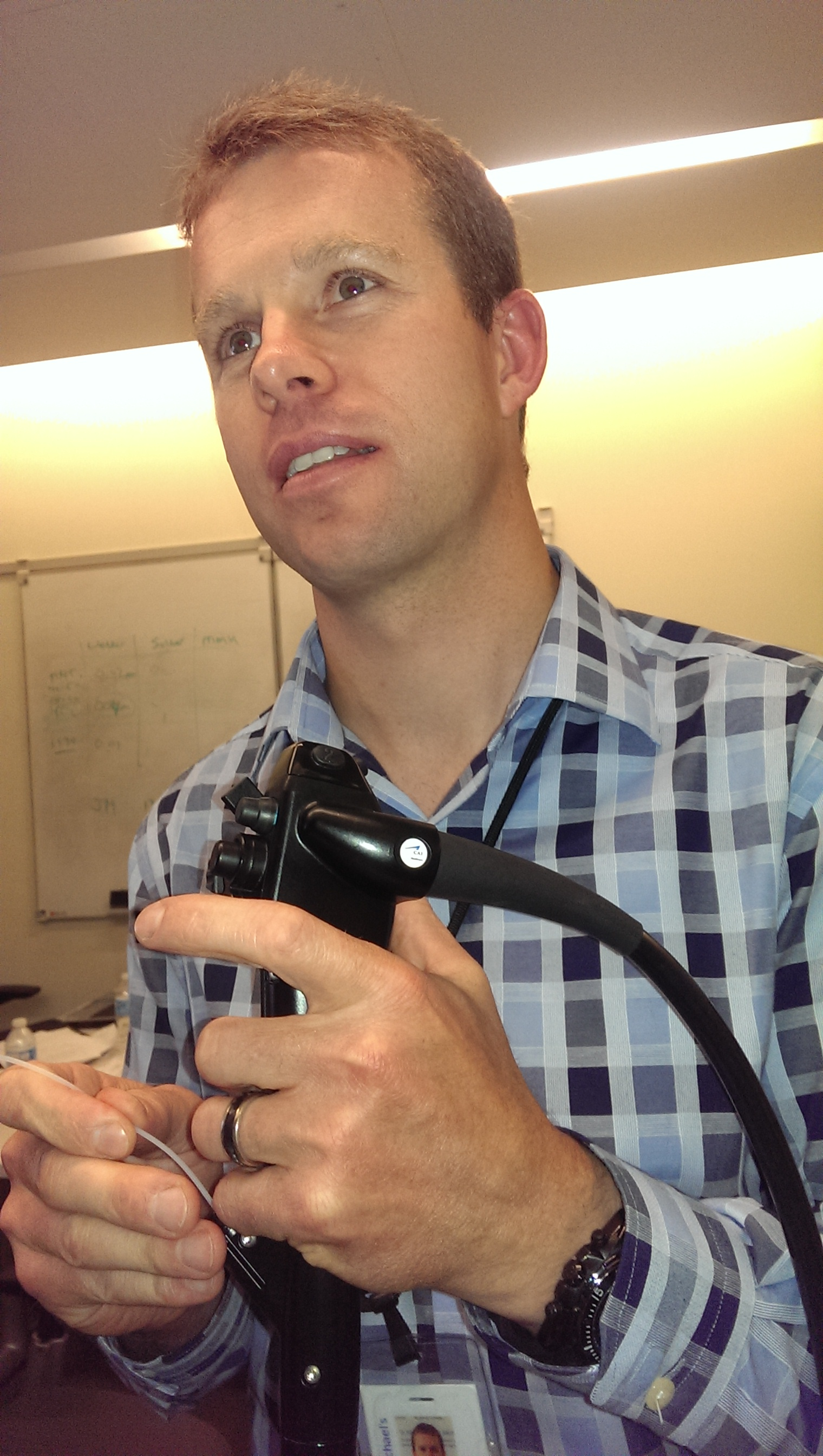
- Gordon Jewett

Personal information
- Born: 13 January 1978 (age 48) Toronto, Ontario, Canada
- Height: 181 cm (71 in)
- Weight: 72 kg (159 lb)

Sport
- Sport: Skiing
- Club: Foothills Nordic Ski Club; Calgary
- Updated on 19 February 2010

Gordon Jewett (born 13 January 1978 at Toronto, Ontario) is a Canadian cross-country skier who has competed since 1997.

He competed at the 2010 Winter Olympics in Vancouver in the men's 15 km freestyle competition where he finished 52nd with a time of 2:41.6 behind the gold medal time.

Jewett's best finish at the FIS Nordic World Ski Championships was 37th in the individual sprint event at Oberstdorf in 2005.

His best World Cup finish was 17th in a team sprint event at Canada in 2005.
