= Stefan Read =

Canadian ski jumper

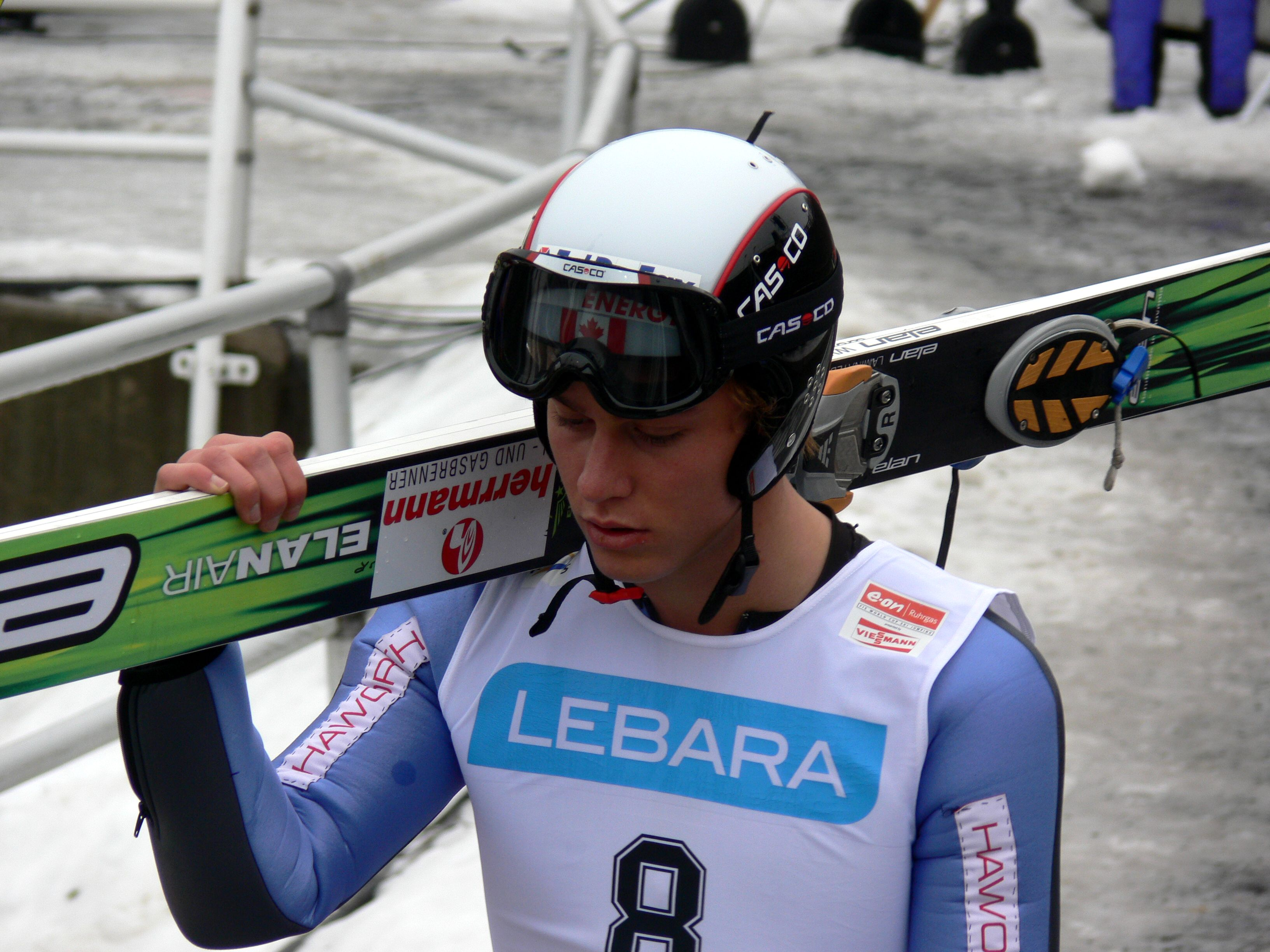

Personal information
- Full name: Stefan Read
- Born: May 7, 1987 (age 39) Edmonton, Alberta, Canada

Sport
- Sport: Skiing
- Club: Altius Nordic Ski Club

World Cup career
- Seasons: 2005-2010
- Indiv. podiums: 0
- Indiv. wins: 0

Achievements and titles
- Personal best: 177m

Stefan Read (born May 7, 1987) is a Canadian ski jumper. Competing in two Winter Olympics, he earned his best finish of 12th in the team large hill event at Vancouver in 2010.

== Early life ==
Read was born in Edmonton, Alberta. He began downhill skiing at an early age. He attended the National Sport School.

== Career ==
Read began competing in ski jumping in 2002. In 2004 he finished 27th at a Continental Cup in Lahti, Finland, which qualified him to take part in Olympic competition.

Read competed in both the normal hill and the K120m Large Hill events at the 2006 Olympic Games in Turin, Italy, placing 20th and 47th respectively.

His best result in the World Cup so far is a 23rd place at Zakopane in 2006. Read's best finish at the FIS Nordic World Ski Championships was 12th in the team large hill event at Sapporo in 2007.
