= Eric Mitchell (skier) =

Canadian ski jumper

Personal information
- National team: Canada
- Born: April 10, 1992 (age 32); Calgary, Alberta, Canada

Sport
- Sport: Ski jumper

Achievements and titles
- Olympic finals: 2010 Winter Olympics

Eric Mitchell (born 1992) is a Canadian ski jumper who has competed since 2008. At the 2010 Winter Olympics in Vancouver, he finished 12th in the team large hill, 49th in the individual normal hill, and 51st in the individual large hill events.

Mitchell's best career individual finish was 1st in an FIS Cup HS 106 event at Poland in 2011.

In 2013, he was the top Canadian at the National Championships in Whistler.

Mitchell officially came out as gay in a profile on the LGBT sports publication Outsports in 2015.
