= Madeleine Williams =

Canadian cross-country skier

Personal information
- Nationality: Canada
- Born: 28 March 1983 (age 43) Rocky Mountain House, Alberta, Canada
- Height: 163 cm (5 ft 4 in)
- Weight: 55 kg (121 lb)

Sport
- Sport: Skiing
- Club: Edmonton Nordic Ski Club

World Cup career
- Seasons: 4 – (2006, 2008–2010)
- Indiv. starts: 15
- Indiv. podiums: 0
- Team starts: 3
- Team podiums: 0
- Overall titles: 0 – (102nd in 2009)
- Discipline titles: 0

Madeleine Williams (born 28 March 1983 at Rocky Mountain House, Alberta) is a Canadian cross-country skier who has competed internationally since 2000.

Williams grew up in Edmonton, Alberta. She was always very dedicated at school. Madeleine excelled in athletics from an early age, being able to outrun every other child on the field.

She competed at the 2010 Winter Olympics in Vancouver in the 10 km freestyle and 15 km pursuit competitions. In the freestyle competition on 15 February, she placed 51st with a 27:43.6 time (2:45.2 behind first). Four days later she came in 41st in the pursuit race, 4:13.1 behind the gold medal winner Marit Bjørgen of Norway. She also anchored the Canadian women's 4x5km relay and competed in the 30 km classic race.

Williams' best finish in the World Cup was tenth in a team sprint event at Canada in 2009 while her best individual finish was 22nd in a 15 km mixed pursuit event at that same event.

== Cross-country skiing results ==
All results are sourced from the International Ski Federation (FIS).

=== Olympic Games ===
Year	Age	10 km individual	15 km skiathlon	30 km mass start	Sprint	4 × 5 km relay	Team sprint
2010	26	50	40	45	—	15	—

=== World Cup ===
==== Season standings ====
Season	Age	Discipline standings			Ski Tour standings		
Season	Age	Overall	Distance	Sprint	Nordic Opening	Tour de Ski	World Cup Final
2006	22	NC	NC	—	—N/a	—N/a	—N/a
2008	24	NC	NC	NC	—N/a	—	—
2009	25	102	73	NC	—N/a	—	—
2010	26	NC	NC	NC	—	—	—
