= Stanislav Detkov =

Russian snowboarder (born 1980)

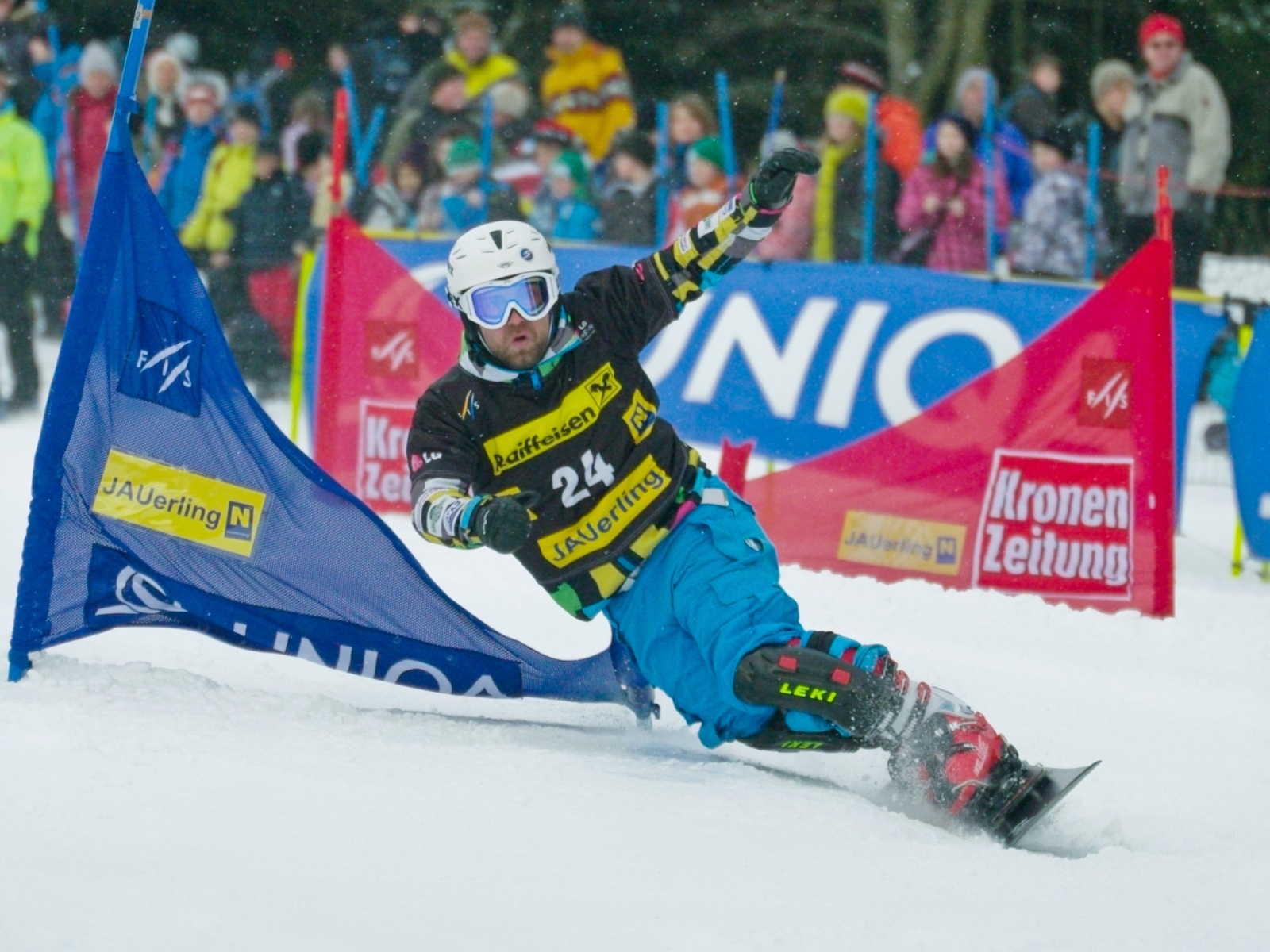
Stanislav Detkov (2012)

Stanislav Valeryevich Detkov (Russian: Станислав Валерьевич Детков; born September 16, 1980) is a Russian snowboarder. He competed at the 2010 Winter Olympics in the "Men's Parallel Giant Slalom" and came 11th with a total time of 1:18:29.
