= 2021 in sports =

2021 in sports describes the year's events in world sport.

== Major sports news ==
- In mountain running, the Gansu ultramarathon disaster in the Yellow River Stone Forest, China led 21 runners to die from hypothermia. The poor organization of this government-run race led to a national outcry on the regulations of the sport.
- In sprinting, during the Olympics, Krystsina Tsimanouskaya criticised her Belarusian coaches for entering her in the 4 × 400 m relay, a distance she had never contested, without her consent, after others missed doping tests and were disqualified. Her coaches forced her to fly back to Belarus. She entered the Polish embassy in Tokyo and was granted a humanitarian visa. The International Olympic Committee revoked the accreditation of her coaches and expelled them from the Olympic Village.

== World records ==
In chronological order

- 17 May: In swimming, Russian Kliment Kolesnikov broke the 50 metre backstroke world record at the 2020 European Aquatics Championships with a time of 23.93.
- 18 May: In swimming, Russian Kliment Kolesnikov broke the 50 metre backstroke world record at the 2020 European Aquatics Championships with a time of 23.80.
- 22 May: In swimming, Italian Benedetta Pilato broke the women's 50 metre breaststroke world record at the 2020 European Aquatics Championships with a time of 29.30.
- 13 June: In swimming, Australian Kaylee McKeown broke the women's 100 metre backstroke world record at the 2021 Australian Swimming Trials with a time of 57.45.
- 18 June: In athletics, American Ryan Crouser broke the shot put world record at the 2020 United States Olympic Trials (track and field) with a distance of 23.37 metres.
- 25 July: In swimming, Team Australia, consisting of Bronte Campbell, Meg Harris, Emma McKeon, and Cate Campbell broke the women's 4x100 metre freestyle relay world record at the 2020 Summer Olympics with a time of 3:29.69.
- 29 July: In swimming, Team China, consisting of Yang Junxuan, Tang Muhan, Zhang Yufei, and Li Bingjie broke the women's 4x200 metre freestyle relay world record at the 2020 Summer Olympics with a time of 7:40.33.
- 30 July: In swimming, South African Tatjana Schoenmaker broke the women's 200 metre breaststroke world record at the 2020 Summer Olympics with a time of 2:18.95.
- 31 July: In swimming, American Caeleb Dressel broke the 100 metre butterfly world record at the 2020 Summer Olympics with a time of 49.45.
- 31 July: In swimming, Team Great Britain, consisting of Kathleen Dawson, Adam Peaty, James Guy, and Anna Hopkin broke the mixed 4x100 metre medley relay world record at the 2020 Summer Olympics with a time of 3:37.58.
- 1 August: In swimming, Team USA, consisting of Ryan Murphy, Michael Andrew, Caeleb Dressel, and Zach Apple broke the 4x100 metre medley relay world record at the 2020 Summer Olympics with a time of 3:26.78.
- 1 August: In athletics, Venezuelan Yulimar Rojas broke the women's triple jump world record at the 2020 Summer Olympics with a distance of 15.67 metres.
- 3 August: In athletics, Norwegian Karsten Warholm broke the 400 metres hurdles world record at the 2020 Summer Olympics with a time of 45.94.
- 4 August: In athletics, American Sydney McLaughlin broke the women's 400 metres hurdles world record at the 2020 Summer Olympics with a time of 51.46.
- 29 August: In swimming, American Coleman Stewart broke the short course 100 metre backstroke world record at the 2021 International Swimming League with a time of 48.33.
- 29 October: In swimming, Australian Kyle Chalmers broke the short course 100 metre freestyle world record at the 2021 FINA Swimming World Cup with a time of 44.84.
- 3 November: In swimming, Team Italy, consisting of Michele Lamberti, Nicolo Martinenghi, Marco Orsi, and Lorenzo Zazzeri broke the short course 4x50 metre medley relay world record at the 2021 European Short Course Swimming Championships with a time of 1:30.14.
- 6 November: In swimming, Hungarian Szebasztián Szabó tied the short course 50 metre butterfly world record at the 2021 European Short Course Swimming Championships with a time of 21.75.
- 7 November: In swimming, Belarusian Ilya Shymanovich tied the short course 50 metre breastroke world record at the 2021 European Short Course Swimming Championships with a time of 25.25.
- 7 November: In swimming, Team Netherlands, consisting of Kira Toussaint, Arno Kamminga, Maaike de Waard, and Thom de Boer broke the short course 4x50 metre mixed medley relay world record at the 2021 European Short Course Swimming Championships with a time of 1:36.18.
- 19 November: In swimming, Belarusian Ilya Shymanovich broke the short course 100 metre breaststroke world record at the 2021 International Swimming League with a time of 55.32.

== Air sports ==
- 10 – 24 July: 5th FAI Junior European Gliding Championships in (Lithuania) Pociūnai
- 28 July – 6 August: 23rd FAI World Glider Aerobatic Championships and 11th FAI World Advanced Glider Aerobatic Championships in (Poland) Leszno
- 29 July – 7 August: 14th FAI World Advanced Aerobatic Championships in (Poland) Toruń
- 7 – 21 August: 36th FAI World Gliding Championships in (France) Montluçon – Guéret
- 9 – 21 August: 2020 FAI World Parachuting Championships in (Russia) Tanay-Kemerovo
- 2 – 8 October: 2021 FAI S World Championships for Space Models in (Romania) Buzău

== Alpine skiing ==
=== FIS Alpine World Ski Championships 2021 ===
- 9 – 21 February: in (Italy) Cortina d'Ampezzo
  - Super G winners: (Austria) Vincent Kriechmayr (m) / (Switzerland) Lara Gut-Behrami (f)
    - (gold) (Austria) Vincent Kriechmayr (m) / (Switzerland) Lara Gut-Behrami (f)
    - (silver) (Germany) Romed Baumann (m) / (Switzerland) Corinne Suter (f)
    - (bronze) (France) Alexis Pinturault (m) / (United States) Mikaela Shiffrin (f)
  - Downhill winners: (Austria) Vincent Kriechmayr (m) / (Switzerland) Corinne Suter (f)
  - Alpine Combined winners: (Austria) Marco Schwarz (m) / (United States) Mikaela Shiffrin
  - Parallel winners: (France) Mathieu Faivre (m) / (Italy) Marta Bassino & (Austria) Katharina Liensberger (f)
  - Team Parallel winners: Norway (Sebastian Foss-Solevåg, Kristin Lysdahl, Kristina Riis-Johannessen, Fabian Wilkens Solheim, Thea Louise Stjernesund)
  - Giant Slalom winners: (France) Mathieu Faivre (m) / (Switzerland) Lara Gut-Behrami (f)
  - Slalom winners: (Norway) Sebastian Foss-Solevåg (m) / (Austria) Katharina Liensberger (f)

=== World Junior Alpine Skiing Championships 2021 ===
- 2 – 10 March: in (Bulgaria) Bansko
  - Super G winners: (Italy) Giovanni Franzoni (m) / (Austria) Lena Wechner (f)
  - Giant Slalom winners: (Austria) Lukas Fuerstein (m) / (Sweden) Hanna Aronsson Elfman (f)
  - Slalom winners: (United States) Benjamin Ritchie (m) / (Italy) Sophie Mathiou (f)

=== 2020–21 FIS Alpine Ski World Cup ===
Men's

- 5 & 7 December 2020: World Cup #1 in (Italy) Santa Caterina
  - Men's Giant Slalom winners: (Croatia) Filip Zubčić (No. 1) / (Switzerland) Marco Odermatt (No. 2)
- 9 – 13 December 2020: World Cup #2 in (France) Val-d'Isère
  - Men's Super G winner: (Switzerland) Mauro Caviezel
  - Men's Downhill winner: (Slovenia) Martin Čater
- 16 – 19 December 2020: World Cup #3 in (Italy) Val Gardena
  - Men's Super G winner: (Norway) Aleksander Aamodt Kilde
  - Men's Downhill winner: (Norway) Aleksander Aamodt Kilde
- 20 & 21 December 2020: World Cup #4 in (Italy) Alta Badia
  - Men's Giant Slalom winner: (France) Alexis Pinturault
  - Men's Slalom winner: (Switzerland) Ramon Zenhäusern
- 22 December 2020: WC #5 in (Italy) Madonna di Campiglio (Men's only)
  - Me's Slalom winner: (Norway) Henrik Kristoffersen
- 26 – 29 December 2020: WC #6 in (Italy) Bormio
  - Men's Super G winner: (United States) Ryan Cochran-Siegle
  - Men's Downhill winner: (Austria) Matthias Mayer
- 8 – 10 January: WC #7 in (Switzerland) Adelboden
  - Men's Giant Slalom winners: (France) Alexis Pinturault (2 times)
  - Men's Slalom winner: (Austria) Marco Schwarz
- 16 & 17 January: WC #8 in (Austria) Flachau
  - Men's Slalom winners: (Austria) Manuel Feller (No. 1) / (Norway) Sebastian Foss-Solevåg (No. 2)
- 19 – 25 January: WC #9 in (Austria) Kitzbühel
  - Men's Downhill winners: (Switzerland) Beat Feuz (2 times)
  - Men's Super G winner: (Austria) Vincent Kriechmayr
- 26 January: WC #10 in (Austria) Schladming
  - Men's Slalom winner: (Austria) Marco Schwarz
- 30 & 31 January: WC #11 in (France) Chamonix
  - Men's Slalom winners: (France) Clément Noël (No. 1) / (Norway) Henrik Kristoffersen (No. 2)
- 3 – 6 February: WC #12 in (Germany) Garmisch-Partenkirchen
  - Men's Downhill winner: (Italy) Dominik Paris
  - Men's Super G winner: (Austria) Vincent Kriechmayr
- 27 & 28 February: WC #13 in (Bulgaria) Bansko
  - Men's Giant Slalom winners: (Croatia) Filip Zubčić (No. 1) / (France) Mathieu Faivre (No. 2)
- 3 – 7 March: WC #14 in (Austria) Saalbach-Hinterglemm
  - Men's Downhill winner: (Austria) Vincent Kriechmayr
  - Men's Super G winner: (Switzerland) Marco Odermatt
- 13 & 14 March: WC #15 in (Slovenia) Kranjska Gora
  - Men's Giant Slalom winner: (Switzerland) Marco Odermatt
  - Men's Slalom winner: (France) Clément Noël

Women's

- 21 & 22 November 2020: World Cup #1 in (Finland) Levi
  - Women's Slalom winners: (Slovakia) Petra Vlhová (2 times)
- 12 – 14 December 2020: World Cup #2 in (France) Courchevel
  - Women's Giant Slalom winners: (Italy) Marta Bassino (No. 1) / (United States) Mikaela Shiffrin (No. 2)
- 16 – 20 December 2020: World Cup #3 in (France) Val-d'Isère
  - Women's Downhill winners: (Switzerland) Corinne Suter (No. 1) / (Italy) Sofia Goggia (No. 2)
  - Women's Super G winner: (Czech Republic) Ester Ledecká
- 28 & 29 December 2020: WC #4 in (Austria) Semmering
  - Here, the Giant Slalom competition is cancelled.
- 7 – 10 January: WC #5 in (Austria) St Anton am Arlberg
  - Women's Downhill winner: (Italy) Sofia Goggia
  - Women's Super G winner: (Switzerland) Lara Gut-Behrami
- 12 January: WC #6 in (Austria) Flachau
  - Women's Slalom winner: (United States) Mikaela Shiffrin
- 16 & 17 January: WC #7 in (Slovenia) Kranjska Gora
  - Women's Giant Slalom winners: (Italy) Marta Bassino (2 times)
- 20 – 24 January: WC #8 in (Switzerland) Crans-Montana
  - Women's Downhill winners: (Italy) Sofia Goggia (2 times)
  - Women's Super G winner: (Switzerland) Lara Gut-Behrami
- 26 January: WC #9 in (Italy) Kronplatz
  - Women's Giant Slalom winner: (France) Tessa Worley
- 28 – 31 January: WC #10 in (Germany) Garmisch-Partenkirchen
  - Women's Super G winners: (Switzerland) Lara Gut-Behrami (2 times)
- 24 – 27 February: WC #11 in (Italy) Val di Fassa
  - Women's Downhill winners: (Switzerland) Lara Gut-Behrami (2 times)
  - Women's Super G winner: (Italy) Federica Brignone
- 6 & 7 March: WC #12 in (Slovakia) Jasná
  - Women's Slalom winner: (United States) Mikaela Shiffrin
  - Women's Giant Slalom winner: (Slovakia) Petra Vlhová
- 12 & 13 March: WC #13 in (Sweden) Åre
  - Women's Slalom winners: (Slovakia) Petra Vlhová (No. 1) / (Austria) Katharina Liensberger (No. 2)

Mixed

- 17 & 18 October 2020: World Cup #1 in (Austria) Sölden
  - Giant Slalom winners: (Norway) Lucas Braathen (m) / (Italy) Marta Bassino (f)
- 26 & 27 November 2020: World Cup #2 in (Austria) Lech/Zürs
  - Giant Parallel Slalom winners: (France) Alexis Pinturault (m) / (Slovakia) Petra Vlhová (f)
  - Women's Slalom winner: (Switzerland) Michelle Gisin
- 3 – 6 January: WC #3 in (Croatia) Zagreb
  - Slalom winners: (Germany) Linus Straßer (m) / (Slovakia) Petra Vlhová (f)
- 12 – 17 January: WC #4 in (Switzerland) Wengen
  - Event cancelled.
- 15 – 21 March: WC #5 in (Switzerland) Lenzerheide
  - Downhill and Super G events here are cancelled.
  - Slalom winners: (Austria) Manuel Feller (m) / (Austria) Katharina Liensberger (f)
  - Giant Slalom winners: (France) Alexis Pinturault (m) / (New Zealand) Alice Robinson (f)
  - Team Parallel winners: Norway (Kristina Riis-Johannessen, Leif Kristian Nestvold-Haugen, Kristin Lysdahl, Sebastian Foss-Solevåg)

=== 2020–21 Citizen World Cup ===
- 2 & 3 January: WC #1 in (Switzerland) Pontresina
  - Event cancelled
- 7 – 9 January: WC #2 in (Italy) Falcade/Moena
  - Men's Super G winners: (Italy) Francesco Gatto (No. 1) / (Italy) Matteo Pradal (No. 2)
  - Women's Super G winners: (Canada) Katrina van Soest (2 times)
- 9 & 10 January: WC #3 in (Germany) Lenggries/Brauneck
  - Event cancelled
- 9 & 10 January: WC #4 in (Austria) Turnau
  - Men's Slalom winners: (Czech Republic) Michał Staszowski (No. 1) / (Slovakia) Filip Botka (No. 2)
  - Women's Slalom winners: (Slovakia) Petra Hromcová (2 times)
- 16 & 17 January: WC #5 in (Austria) Reiteralm
  - Men's Giant Slalom winners: (Austria) Jakob Greber (No. 1) / (Austria) Max Greber (No. 2)
- 28 – 31 January: WC #6 in (Italy) Passo San Pellegrino
  - Men's Giant Slalom winner: (Czech Republic) Jan Koula (2 times)
  - Women's Giant Slalom winners: (Canada) Caroline Beauchamp (No. 1) / (Italy) Carlotta De Leonardis (No. 2)
- 9 – 12 February: WC #7 in (Italy) Abetone
  - Slalom winners: (United Kingdom) Toby Case (m) / (Italy) Lisa Rodari (f)
  - Giant Slalom winners: (Italy) Thomas Meraner (m) / (Italy) Camilla Furletti (f)
- 18 February 20: WC #8 in (Switzerland) Sils/Furtschellas
  - Men's Slalom winners: (Switzerland) Luc Herrmann (2 times)
  - Women's Slalom winners: (Italy) Carlotta Maria Clara Marcora (2 times)
- 20 & 21 February: WC #9 in (Spain) La Molina
  - Giant Slalom winners: (Spain) Andrés García (m) / (Spain) Inês Araújo (f)
  - Slalom winners: (Spain) Samuel Beso (m) / (Spain) Inés Sanmartín Arbones (f)
- 1 – 3 March: WC #10 in (Austria) Hinterreit
  - Men's Super G winners: (Austria) Luis Tritscher (2 times)
  - Women's Super G winners: (Austria) Florentina Schnittler (No. 1) / (Germany) Chantal-Isell Laszlo (No. 2)
- 6 & 7 March: WC #11 in (Spain) Espot
  - Men's Slalom winners: (Spain) Aniol Torres Casas (No. 1) / (Spain) Alejandro Miquel (No. 2)
  - Women's Slalom winners: (Spain) Inés Sanmartín Arbones (No. 1) / (Spain) Noelia Gasienica-Kotelnicka (No. 2)
- 6 & 7 March: WC #11 in (Switzerland) Tschappina
  - Men's Giant Slalom winner: (Austria) Martin-Luis Walch (No. 1) / (Switzerland) Dario Büschlen (No. 2)
  - Women's Giant Slalom winners: (Switzerland) Selina Gadient (2 times)
- 15 March: WC #12 in (Italy) Santa Caterina di Valfurva
  - Super G winners: (Italy) Luca Resinelli (m) / (Switzerland) Flavia Lüönd (f)

=== 2020–21 FIS Alpine Ski Europa Cup ===
- 2 & 3 November 2020: EC #1 in (Austria) Obergurgl
  - Men's Giant Slalom winners: (Austria) Raphael Haaser (No. 1) / (Germany) Julian Rauchfuss (No. 2)
- 7 – 9 December 2020: EC #2 in (Switzerland) Zinal (Men's only)
  - Men's Super G winner: (Switzerland) Ralph Weber
  - Men's Alpine Combined winner: (Switzerland) Joel Lütolf
  - Men's Giant Slalom winner: (France) Cyprien Sarrazin
- 12 & 13 December 2020: EC #3 in (Italy) Cadipietra (Women's only)
  - Women's Slalom winners: (Italy) Lara Della Mea (No. 1) / (Czech Republic) Martina Dubovská (f)
- 12 – 15 December 2020: EC #4 in (Italy) Santa Caterina di Valfurva (Men's only)
  - Men's Downhill winners: (Austria) Maximilian Lahnsteiner (No. 1) / (Austria) Clemens Nocker (No. 2)
- 16 & 17 December 2020: EC #5 in (Austria) Hippach (Women's only)
  - Women's Giant Slalom winners: (Poland) Maryna Gąsienica-Daniel (2 times)
- 17 & 18 December 2020: EC #6 in (Italy) Val di Fassa (Men's only)
  - Men's Slalom winners: (France) Clément Noël (No. 1) / (France) Théo Letitre (No. 2)
- 20 & 21 December 2020: EC #7 in (Italy) Andalo (Women's only)
  - Women's Giant Slalom winners: (Norway) Mina Fürst Holtmann (No. 1) / Second here is cancelled.
- 21 & 22 December 2020: EC #8 in (Austria) Altenmarkt (Men's only)
  - Men's Super G winners: (Austria) Raphael Haaser (No. 1) / (France) Roy Piccard (No. 2)
- 4 & 5 January: EC #9 in (Switzerland) Zinal (Women's only)
  - Women's Super G winners: (Switzerland) Stephanie Jenal (No. 1) / (Austria) Lisa Grill (No. 2)
- 6 & 7 January: EC #10 in (France) Val Cenis (Men's only)
  - Men's Slalom winners: (United Kingdom) Laurie Taylor (No. 1) / (United Kingdom) Billy Major (No. 2)
- 9 & 10 January: EC #11 in (France) Vaujany (Women's only)
  - Women's Slalom winners: (Sweden) Elsa Håkansson-Fermbäck (No. 1) / (Slovenia) Andreja Slokar (No. 2)
- 14 – 17 January: EC #12 in (Switzerland) Crans-Montana
  - Women's Downhill winners: (Switzerland) Jasmine Flury (No. 1) / Second here is cancelled.
- 18 & 19 January: EC #13 in (Switzerland) Zinal (Men's only)
  - Men's Super G winners: (Switzerland) Lars Rösti (No. 1) / (Switzerland) Joshua Mettler (No. 2)
- 20 & 21 January: EC #14 in (Switzerland) Gstaad (Women's only)
  - Women's Slalom winners: (Austria) Marie-Therese Sporer (No. 1) / (Slovenia) Andreja Slokar (No. 2)
- 25 & 26 January: EC #15 in (Austria) Zell am See (Women's only)
  - Women's Slalom winners: (Germany) Lena Dürr (No. 1) / (Croatia) Zrinka Ljutić (No. 2)
- 25 – 30 January: EC #16 in (France) Orcières-Merlette (Men's only)
  - Men's Downhill winners: (United States) Erik Arvidsson (No. 1) / (France) Victor Schuller (No. 2)
  - Men's Super G winner: (Austria) Maximilian Lahnsteiner
- 2 & 3 February: EC #17 in (Italy) Folgaria (Men's only)
  - Men's Giant Slalom winners: (Switzerland) Semyel Bissig (No. 1) / (Norway) Timon Haugan (No. 2)
- 2 & 3 February: EC #18 in (Slovenia) Krvavec (Women's only)
  - Women's Giant Slalom winner: (Croatia) Zrinka Ljutić
- 6 & 7 February: EC #19 in (Germany) Berchtesgaden (Men's only)
  - Men's Giant Slalom winners: (Austria) Dominik Raschner (No. 1) / (Austria) Stefan Brennsteiner (No. 2)
- 9 – 11 February: EC #20 in (Italy) Santa Caterina di Valfurva (Women's only)
  - Downhill winners: (Austria) Lisa Grill (2 times)
- 13 – 15 February: EC #21 in (Germany) Berchtesgaden (Women's only)
  - Giant Slalom winners: (Austria) Elisa Mörzinger (No. 1) / (Sweden) Hilma Loevblom (No. 2) / (No. 3)
- 18 & 19 February: EC #22 in (Switzerland) Hasliberg (Men's only)
  - Men's Slalom winners: (United Kingdom) Billy Major (No. 1) / (United States) Ben Ritchie (No. 2)
- 22 – 25 February: EC #23 in (Italy) Sella Nevea (Men's only)
  - Men's Downhill winners: (France) Victor Schuller (No. 1) / (United States) Erik Arvidsson (No. 2)
- 27 & 28 February: EC #24 in (Germany) Oberjoch (Men's only)
  - Men's Slalom winners: (Norway) Jonathan Nordbotten (No. 1) / Second Slalom competition is cancelled.
- 27 & 28 February: EC #25 in (Italy) Livigno (Women's only)
  - Giant Slalom winners: (Germany) Jessica Hilzinger (No. 1) / (Norway) Marte Monsen (No. 2)
- 2 & 3 March: EC #26 in (Italy) Val di Fassa (Women's only)
  - Women's Super G winners: (Switzerland) Jasmina Suter (No. 1) / (Russia) Iulija Pleshkova (No. 2)
- 10 – 18 March: EC #27 in (Austria) Saalbach-Hinterglemm
  - Downhill and Women's Super G events here are cancelled.
  - Men's Super G winner: (Switzerland) Stefan Rogentin
- 18 – 21 March: EC #28 in (Austria) Reiteralm
  - Giant Slalom winners: (Italy) Hannes Zingerle (m) / (Norway) Marte Monsen (f)
  - Slalom winners: (Norway) Alexander Steen Olsen (m) / (United Kingdom) Charlie Guest (f)

== American football ==
=== National Football League ===
- 31 January: 2021 Pro Bowl
  - Cancelled.
- 7 February: Super Bowl LV in (Florida) Tampa
  - (Florida) Tampa Bay Buccaneers (NFC) defeated Kansas City Chiefs (AFC), 31–9, to win their second Super Bowl title.
- 22–24 April: 2021 NFL draft in (Ohio) Cleveland
- 9 September – 2 January 2022: 2021 NFL season

=== 2020–21 NCAA football bowl games ===
- 21 December 2020: Myrtle Beach Bowl in (South Carolina) Conway
  - (North Carolina) Appalachian State Mountaineers defeated North Texas Mean Green, 56–28.
- 22 December 2020: Famous Idaho Potato Bowl in Boise
  - Nevada Wolf Pack defeated (Louisiana) Tulane Green Wave, 38–27.
- 22 December 2020: Boca Raton Bowl in (Florida) Boca Raton
  - (Utah) BYU Cougars defeated (Florida) UCF Knights, 49–23.
- 23 December 2020: New Orleans Bowl in New Orleans
  - (Georgia (U.S. state)) Georgia Southern Eagles defeated Louisiana Tech Bulldogs, 38–3.
- 23 December 2020: Montgomery Bowl in (Alabama) Montgomery
  - (Tennessee) Memphis Tigers defeated Florida Atlantic Owls, 25–10.
- 24 December 2020: New Mexico Bowl in (Texas) Frisco
  - Hawaii Rainbow Warriors defeated (Texas) Houston Cougars, 28–14.
- 25 December 2020: Camellia Bowl in (Alabama) Montgomery
  - (New York (state)) Buffalo Bulls defeated (West Virginia) Marshall Thundering Herd, 17–10.
- 26 December 2020: First Responder Bowl (Texas) Dallas
  - Louisiana Ragin' Cajuns defeated (Texas) UTSA Roadrunners, 31–24.
- 26 December 2020: LendingTree Bowl in (Alabama) Mobile
  - (Georgia (U.S. state)) Georgia State Panthers defeated Western Kentucky Hilltoppers, 39–21.
- 26 December 2020: Cure Bowl in (Florida) Orlando
  - (Virginia) Liberty Flames defeated (South Carolina) Coastal Carolina Chanticleers, 37–34, after overtime.
- 29 December 2020: Cheez-It Bowl in (Florida) Orlando
  - Oklahoma State Cowboys defeated (Florida) Miami Hurricanes, 37–34.
- 29 December 2020: Alamo Bowl in San Antonio
  - Texas Longhorns defeated Colorado Buffaloes, 55–23.
- 30 December 2020: Duke's Mayo Bowl in (North Carolina) Charlotte
  - Wisconsin Badgers defeated (North Carolina) Wake Forest Demon Deacons, 42–28.
- 30 December 2020: Cotton Bowl Classic in (Texas) Arlington
  - Oklahoma Sooners defeated Florida Gators, 55–20.
- 31 December 2020: Armed Forces Bowl in (Texas) Fort Worth
  - Mississippi State Bulldogs defeated (Oklahoma) Tulsa Golden Hurricane, 28–26.
- 31 December 2020: Arizona Bowl in Tucson
  - (Indiana) Ball State Cardinals defeated (California) San Jose State Spartans, 34–13.
- 31 December 2020: Liberty Bowl in (Tennessee) Memphis
  - West Virginia Mountaineers defeated (New York (state)) Army Black Knights, 24–21.
- 1 January: Peach Bowl in (Georgia (U.S. state)) Atlanta
  - (Georgia (U.S. state)) Georgia Bulldogs defeated Cincinnati Bearcats, 24–21.
- 1 January: Citrus Bowl in (Florida) Orlando
  - (Illinois) Northwestern Wildcats defeated (Alabama) Auburn Tigers, 35–19.
- 1 January: Rose Bowl in (Texas) Arlington
  - Alabama Crimson Tide defeated (Indiana) Notre Dame Fighting Irish, 31–14.
- 1 January: Sugar Bowl in (Louisiana) New Orleans
  - Ohio State Buckeyes defeated (South Carolina) Clemson Tigers, 49–28.
- 2 January: Gator Bowl in (Florida) Jacksonville
  - Kentucky Wildcats defeated (North Carolina) NC State Wolfpack, 23–21.
- 2 January: Outback Bowl in (Florida) Tampa
  - (Mississippi) Ole Miss Rebels defeated Indiana Hoosiers, 26–20.
- 2 January: Fiesta Bowl in (Arizona) Glendale
  - Iowa State Cyclones defeated Oregon Ducks, 34–17.
- 2 January: Orange Bowl in (Florida) Miami Gardens
  - Texas A&M Aggies defeated North Carolina Tar Heels, 41–27.
- 11 January: College Football Playoff National Championship at the (Florida) Hard Rock Stadium
  - Alabama Crimson Tide defeated Ohio State Buckeyes, 52–24.

== Aquatics ==
- 2021 FINA Diving World Cup in Tokyo, Japan.
- 2021 FINA Swimming World Cup.
- 2021 FINA World Swimming Championships (25 m) in Abu Dhabi, United Arab Emirates.
- TBD: 2021 World Para Swimming Championships.
- TBD: 2021 FINA World Junior Open Water Swimming Championships
- TBD: 2021 FINA World Men's Youth Water Polo Championships
- 2021 FINA World Women's Youth Water Polo Championships
- 2021 FINA World Junior Synchronised Swimming Championships
- 2021 FINA World Junior Diving Championships

== Archery ==
- 16–26 September: 2021 World Archery Championships in (United States) Yankton, SD
- 4–10 October: 2021 World Youth Archery Championships in (Australia) Perth
- 2021 World Indoor Archery Championships
- 2021 World 3D Archery Championships
- 2021 World Para Archery Championship delayed until 2022

=== 2021 Archery World Cup ===
- 19 – 25 April: WC #1 in Guatemala City
- 17 – 23 May: WC #2 in (Switzerland) Lausanne
- 22 – 27 June: WC #3 in (France) Paris

=== 2020–21 Indoor World Series ===
- 21 – 22 November 2020: Stage #1 (Worldwide Online)
  - Recurve winners: (Germany) Felix Wieser (m) / (South Korea) Jung-ah Oh (f)
  - Compound winners: (Slovenia) Staš Modic (m) / (Belgium) Sarah Prieels (f)
  - Barebow winners: (Sweden) Erik Jonsson (m) / (Italy) Cinzia Noziglia (f)
- 18 – 20 December 2020: Stage #2 (Worldwide Online)
  - Recurve winners: (United States) Brady Ellison (m) / (South Korea) Wi Nayeon (f)
  - Compound winners: (United States) Dave Cousins (m) / (United Kingdom) Bayley Sargeant (f)
  - Barebow winners: (Sweden) Erik Jonsson (m) / (Sweden) Lina Bjorklund
- 15 – 17 January: Stage #3 (Worldwide Online)
  - Recurve winners: (United States) Brady Ellison (m) / (South Korea) Jang Yoo-jung (f)
  - Compound winners: (France) Jean-Philippe Boulch (m) / (Mexico) Fátima Neri (f)
  - Barebow winners: (Sweden) Erik Jonsson (m) / (Sweden) Lina Bjorklund
- 12 – 14 February: Stage #4 (Worldwide Online)
- 27 & 28 February: Stage #5 (Worldwide Online, finals, Only for teams)

=== Archery Americas ===
- 8 – 14 March: City of Medellín World Ranking Event in (Colombia) Medellín
- 22 – 28 March: 2021 Pan American Archery Championships in (Mexico) Monterrey

=== Archery Europe ===
- 22–27 February: 2021 Archery European Indoor Championships in (Slovenia) Koper
- 16–21 March: European Grand Prix in (Croatia) Poreč
- 6–11 April: European Grand Prix in (Turkey) Antalya
- 30 April – 9 May: European Para-Archery Championships 2021 + Tokyo Paralympics CQT in (Italy) Olbia
- 17–22 May: European Youth Cup 1st leg in (Slovenia) Čatež ob Savi
- 21 May – 6 June: 2021 Archery European Outdoor Championships in (Turkey) Antalya
- 5–11 July: Para-Archery European Cup 2021 – Tokyo Paralympic FQT in (Czech Republic) Nové Město nad Metují
- 2–7 August: European Youth Cup – 2nd leg in (Romania) Bucharest
- 30 August – 4 September: European 3D Championships in (Slovenia) Maribor
- 5–12 September: European Field Championships in (Croatia) Zagreb
- 9 & 10 October: Run-Archery European Cup in (Czech Republic) Nové Město nad Metují

== Arm wrestling ==
- 24 November – 3 December: 2021 World Armwrestling Championship in (Romania) Bucharest

== Association football ==
=== FIFA ===
==== National Teams ====
- 20 May – 12 June: 2021 FIFA U-20 World Cup in Indonesia Cancelled
- 21 July – 6 August: Football at the 2020 Summer Olympics – Women's tournament in Japan
  - (gold) : Canada
  - (silver) : Sweden
  - (bronze) : United States
  - 4th: Australia
- 22 July – 7 August: Football at the 2020 Summer Olympics – Men's tournament in Japan
  - (gold) : Brazil
  - (silver) : Spain
  - (bronze) : Mexico
  - 4th: Japan
- Cancelled: 2021 FIFA U-17 World Cup in Peru

==== Clubs ====
- 1–11 February: 2020 FIFA Club World Cup in Qatar
  - In the final, (Germany) Bayern Munich defeated (Mexico) Tigres UANL, 1–0, to win their second FIFA Club World Cup title.
  - (Egypt) Al Ahly took third place by defeating (Brazil) Palmeiras 0–0 (a.e.t.) (3–2) after penalties.
- 9–19 December: 2021 FIFA Club World Cup in Japan

=== UEFA ===
==== National Teams ====
- 2–14 May: 2021 UEFA Women's U17 Championship in Faroe Islands Cancelled
- 6–22 May: 2021 UEFA U17 Championship in Cyprus Cancelled
- 24 March – 6 June: 2021 UEFA U21 Championship in Hungary and Slovenia Germany defeated Portugal 1–0 to win their 3rd title.
- 6–10 October: 2021 UEFA Nations League Finals
- 7 July – 1 August: 2021 UEFA Women's Euro in England Postponed to 6–31 July 2022
- 30 June – 13 July: 2021 UEFA U19 Championship in Romania Cancelled
- 21 July – 2 August: 2021 UEFA Women's U19 Championship in Belarus Cancelled

==== Clubs ====
- 7 October 2020 – 16 May: 2020–21 UEFA Women's Champions League (final in (Sweden) Gothenburg)
  - In the final, (Spain) Barcelona defeated (England) Chelsea, 4–0, to win their first UEFA Women's Champions League title.
- 17 September 2020 – 26 May: 2020–21 UEFA Europa League (final in (Poland) Gdańsk)
  - In the final, (Spain) Villarreal defeated (England) Manchester United, 1–1 (a.e.t.) (11–10 p), to win their first UEFA Europa League title.
- 15 September 2020 – 29 May: 2020–21 UEFA Champions League (final in (Portugal) Porto)
  - In the final, (England) Chelsea defeated (England) Manchester City, 1–0, to win their second UEFA Champions League title.
- 11 August: 2021 UEFA Super Cup in (Northern Ireland) Belfast
  - In the final, (England) Chelsea defeated (Spain) Villarreal, 1–1 (a.e.t.) (6–5 p), to win their second UEFA Super Cup title.

=== CONMEBOL ===
==== National Teams ====
- 13 June – 10 July: 2021 Copa América in Brazil: Argentina defeated Brazil 1–0 to win their 15th title.

==== Clubs ====
- 23 February – 20 November: 2021 Copa Libertadores
- 16 March – 6 November: 2021 Copa Sudamericana
- 7 April: 2021 Recopa Sudamericana (Argentina) Defensa y Justicia defeated (Brazil) Palmeiras, 4–3 on penalties after tied 3–3 on aggregate to win their first Recopa Sudamericana.
- 30 September – 16 October: 2021 Copa Libertadores Femenina

=== AFC ===
==== National Teams ====
- 28 April – 8 May: 2021 AFC Beach Soccer Asian Cup in Thailand (cancelled)

==== Clubs ====
- 14 April – 27 November: 2021 AFC Champions League
- 14 April – 26 November: 2021 AFC Cup
- 7–12 November: 2021 AFC Women's Club Championship

=== CAF ===
==== National Teams ====
- 16 January – 7 February: 2020 African Nations Championship in (Cameroon) Yaoundé, Douala and Limbe
  - In the final, Morocco defeated Mali, 2–0, to win their 2nd African Nations Championship.
  - Guinea took third place.
- 14 February – 6 March: 2021 Africa U-20 Cup of Nations in (Mauritania) Nouakchott and Nouadhibou
  - In the final, Ghana defeated Uganda, 2–0, to win their 4th African U-20 Cup of Nations Championship.
  - Gambia took third place.
- 11 June – 9 July: 2021 Africa Cup of Nations in Cameroon was postponed to 9 January – 6 February 2022.

==== Clubs ====
- 12 February – 17 July: 2020–21 CAF Champions League (Egypt) Al Ahly SC defeated (South Africa) Kaizer Chiefs 3–0 to win their 10th CAF Champions League title.
- 12 February – 17 July: 2020–21 CAF Confederation Cup (Morocco) Raja Casablanca defeated (Algeria) JS Kabylie 2–1 to win their second CAF Confederation Cup title.
- 28 May: 2020 CAF Super Cup (Egypt) Al Ahly SC defeated (Morocco) RS Berkane 2–0 to win their seventh CAF Super Cup title.
- TBD: 2021 CAF Super Cup

=== CONCACAF ===
==== National Teams ====
- 10 July – 1 August: 2021 CONCACAF Gold Cup
- 18–30 March 2021: 2020 CONCACAF Men's Olympic Qualifying Championship Honduras and Mexico qualified for the 2020 Olympic Games.

==== Clubs ====
- 6 April – 28 October: 2021 CONCACAF Champions League
- 3 August – 15 December: 2021 CONCACAF League
- 15 – 25 May: 2021 Caribbean Club Championship (Haiti) Cavaly defeated (Suriname) Inter Moengotapoe 2–0 in the final to win their first title.
- 23 April – May: 2021 Caribbean Club Shield Cancelled.

=== OFC ===
==== Clubs ====
- TBD: 2021 OFC Champions League Cancelled

== Athletics ==
- 2021 World Athletics Indoor Championships in Nanjing, China. Postponed to 17–19 March 2023
- 2021 World Athletics Cross Country Championships in Bathurst, Australia.
- 2021 Skyrunning World Championships in Pyrenees, Spain.
- (Chinese Taipei) 2021 IAU 50 km World Championships in Taipei, Taiwan.
- 2021 IAU 100 km World Championships
- 2021 IAU 24 hours World Championships in Timișoara, Romania.
- 1–2 May 2021 World Athletics Relays in Chorzów, Poland.
- 2021 World Para Athletics Championships in Kobe, Japan. delayed until 2022
- 30 July – 8 August Athletics at the 2020 Summer Olympics in Tokyo, Japan
- 17–22 August 2021 2021 World Athletics U20 Championships in Nairobi, Kenya.

=== 2021 World Athletics Label Road Races ===
Elite

- 31 January: Osaka International Ladies Marathon in (Japan) Osaka
  - Winner: (Japan) Mao Ichiyama
- 28 February: Lake Biwa Marathon in (Japan) Ōtsu
  - Winner: (Japan) Kengo Suzuki
- 5 March: Djibouti International Half Marathon in Djibouti
  - Winner: (United Kingdom) Mo Farah

=== 2021 World Athletics Indoor Tour ===
Gold

- 29 January: Indoor Meeting – Karlsruhe in (Germany) Karlsruhe
  - Women's 60 m winner: (United Kingdom) Dina Asher-Smith
  - Men's 400 m winner: (Germany) Marvin Schlegel
  - Men's 800 m winner: (United Kingdom) Elliot Giles
  - Women's 1500 m winner: (Germany) Katharina Trost
  - 3000 m winners: (Kenya) Bethwell Birgen (m) / (Kenya) Beatrice Chepkoech (f)
  - 60 m Hurdles winners: (France) Wilhem Belocian (m) / (Finland) Nooralotta Neziri (f)
  - Men's Long Jump winner: (Cuba) Juan Miguel Echevarría
  - Women's Triple Jump winner: (Cuba) Liadagmis Povea
  - Men's Pole Vault winner: (France) Renaud Lavillenie
  - Women's Shot Put winner: (Portugal) Auriol Dongmo Mekemnang
- 2 February: Banskobystricka latka in (Slovakia) Banská Bystrica (Men's High Jump)
  - Winner: (Italy) Gianmarco Tamberi
- 9 February: Meeting Hauts de France Pas de Calais in Liévin
  - 60 m winners: (Italy) Marcell Jacobs (m) / (United States) Javianne Oliver (f)
  - 800 m winners: (United Kingdom) Elliot Giles (m) / (United Kingdom) Jemma Reekie (f)
  - 1500 m winners: (Norway) Jakob Ingebrigtsen (m) / (Ethiopia) Gudaf Tsegay (f)
  - 3000 m winners: (Ethiopia) Getnet Wale (m) / (Ethiopia) Lemlem Hailu (f)
  - 60 m Hurdles winners: (United States) Grant Holloway (m) / (Netherlands) Nadine Visser (f)
  - Women's 2000 m Steeplechase winner: (Bahrain) Winfred Yavi
  - Men's Long Jump winner: (Cuba) Juan Miguel Echevarría
  - Women's Pole Vault winner: (United Kingdom) Holly Bradshaw
  - Women's Shot Put winner: (Portugal) Auriol Dongmo Mekemnang
- 13 February: New Balance Indoor Grand Prix in (United States) New York
  - 60 m winners: (United States) Trayvon Bromell (m) / (United States) Kayla White (f)
  - Men's 200 m winner: (United States) Noah Lyles
  - 300 m winners: (Trinidad and Tobago) Jereem Richards (m) / (United States) Gabrielle Thomas (f)
  - 400 m winners: (United States) Michael Norman (m) / (The Bahamas) Shaunae Miller-Uibo (f)
  - Women's 500 m winner: (United States) Olga Kosichenko
  - 800 m winners: (United States) Donavan Brazier (m) / (United States) Ajeé Wilson (f)
  - Men's 1000 m winner: (United States) Bryce Hoppel
  - 1500 m winners: (Australia) Oliver Hoare (m) / (United States) Heather MacLean (f)
  - 2 Miles winners: (Canada) Justyn Knight (m) / (United States) Elinor Purrier (f)
  - 3000 m winners: (United States) Eric Holt (m) / (United States) Dani Jones (f)
  - Women's 60 m Hurdles winner: (United States) Kendra Harrison
  - Men's High Jump winner: (United States) Trey Culver
  - Women's Pole Vault winner: (United States) Sandi Morris
- 17 February: Copernicus Cup in (Poland) Toruń
  - Women's 60 m winner: (United States) Javianne Oliver
  - Women's 400 m winner: (Netherlands) Femke Bol
  - 800 m winners: (United Kingdom) Elliot Giles (m) / (Ethiopia) Habitam Alemu (f)
  - Men's 1500 m winner: (Ethiopia) Selemon Barega
  - Women's 3000 m winner: (Ethiopia) Lemlem Hailu
  - 60 m Hurdles winners: (United States) Grant Holloway (m) / (United States) Christina Clemons (f)
  - Women's Triple Jump winner: (Greece) Paraskevi Papachristou
  - Men's High Jump winner: (Belarus) Maksim Nedasekau
  - Men's Pole Vault winner: (United States) Sam Kendricks
  - Men's Shot Put winner: (Poland) Michał Haratyk
- 24 February: Villa De Madrid Indoor Meeting in (Spain) Madrid
  - Men's 60 m winner: (Ivory Coast) Arthur Cissé
  - Men's 400 m winner: (Czech Republic) Pavel Maslák
  - 800 m winners: (Spain) Mariano García (m) / (Ethiopia) Habitam Alemu (f)
  - 1500 m winners: (Ethiopia) Selemon Barega (m) / (Ethiopia) Hirut Meshesha (f)
  - Women's 3000 m winner: (Ethiopia) Gudaf Tsegay
  - 60 m Hurdles winners: (United States) Grant Holloway (m) / (Netherlands) Nadine Visser (f)
  - Men's Long Jump winner: (Cuba) Juan Miguel Echevarría
  - Women's Triple Jump winner: (United States) Tori Franklin
  - Women's Pole Vault winner: (Ukraine) Iryna Zhuk

Silver

- 24 January: American Track League 1 in (United States) Fayetteville
  - 60 m winners: (United States) Trayvon Bromell (m) / (Nigeria) Blessing Okagbare (f)
  - 400 m winners: (United States) Fred Kerley (m) / (United States) Quanera Hayes (f)
  - 60 m Hurdles winners: (United States) Grant Holloway (m) / (United States) Tonea Marshall (f)
  - Women's High Jump winner: (United States) Vashti Cunningham
  - Women's Pole Vault winner: (United States) Megan Clark
  - Men's Shot Put winner: (United States) Ryan Crouser (World Record)
- 31 January: American Track League 2 in (United States) Fayetteville
  - 60 m winners: (United States) Maurice Eaddy (m) / (United States) Mikiah Brisco (f)
  - 200 m winners: (Trinidad and Tobago) Jereem Richards (m) / (The Bahamas) Shaunae Miller-Uibo (f)
  - 600 m winners: (United States) Nicholis Hilson (m) / (United States) Samantha Watson (f)
  - Men's 800 m winner: (United States) Bryce Hoppel
  - Women's 1 Mile Run winner: (United States) Heather MacLean
  - Men's 60 m Hurdles winner: (United States) Trevor Bassitt
  - Women's Long Jump winner: (United States) Kendell Williams
  - Women's Pole Vault winner: (United States) Sandi Morris
  - Men's Shot Put winner: (United States) Ryan Crouser
- 31 January: ISTAF Indoor in (Germany) Düsseldorf
  - 60 m winners: (Ivory Coast) Arthur Cissé (m) / (United Kingdom) Dina Asher-Smith (f)
  - 60 m Hurdles winners: (Poland) Damian Czykier (m) / (Netherlands) Nadine Visser (f)
  - Women's Long Jump winner: (Germany) Malaika Mihambo
  - Men's Pole Vault winner: (Sweden) Armand Duplantis
- 2 February: Banskobystricka latka in (Slovakia) Banská Bystrica (Women's High Jump)
  - Winner: (Ukraine) Yaroslava Mahuchikh
- 3 February: Czech Indoor Gala in (Czech Republic) Ostrava
  - 60 m winners: (United Kingdom) Oliver Bromby (m) / (Netherlands) Jamile Samuel (f)
  - 400 m winners: (Czech Republic) Pavel Maslák (m) / (Belgium) Cynthia Bolingo (f)
  - Men's 800 m winner: (United Kingdom) Jamie Webb
  - 1500 m winners: (Hungary) István Szögi (m) / (Sweden) Meraf Bahta (f)
  - Women's 60 m Hurdles winner: (Poland) Pia Skrzyszowska
  - Men's High Jump winner: (Bulgaria) Tihomir Ivanov
  - Men's Long Jump winner: (Czech Republic) Radek Juška
  - Men's Shot Put winner: (Czech Republic) Tomáš Staněk
  - Women's Pole Vault winner: (Slovenia) Tina Šutej
- 5 February: ISTAF Indoor in (Germany) Berlin
  - 60 m winners: (Ivory Coast) Arthur Cissé (m) / (Slovenia) Maja Mihalinec (f)
  - 60 m Hurdles winners: (United States) Aaron Mallett / (United States) Christina Clemons (f)
  - Women's Long Jump winner: (Germany) Malaika Mihambo
  - Men's Pole Vault winner: (Philippines) Ernest Obiena
- 6 February: Perche Elite Tour in (France) Rouen
  - Pole Vault winners: (Sweden) Armand Duplantis (m) / (United Kingdom) Holly Bradshaw (f)
- 6 February: Meeting Metz Moselle Athlélor in (France) Metz
  - 60 m winners: (United States) Devin Quinn (m) / (United States) Javianne Oliver (f)
  - 200 m winners: (Slovakia) Ján Volko (m) / (Netherlands) Lieke Klaver (f)
  - 400 m winners: (Netherlands) Liemarvin Bonevacia (m) / (Netherlands) Femke Bol (f)
  - 800 m winners: (Belgium) Eliott Crestan (m) / (Ethiopia) Habitam Alemu (f)
  - Men's 1500 m winner: (Ethiopia) Selemon Barega
  - Men's 3000 m winner: (Republic of Ireland) Seán Tobin
  - 60 m winners: (United States) Jarret Eaton (m) / (Nigeria) Oluwatobiloba Amusan (f)
  - Men's Long Jump winner: (Cuba) Maykel Massó
  - Men's Triple Jump winner: (Cuba) Andy Díaz
- 7 February: American Track League 3 in (United States) Fayetteville
  - 60 m winners: (United States) Ronnie Baker (m) / (Nigeria) Blessing Okagbare (f)
  - Women's 200 m winner: (Nigeria) Blessing Okagbare
  - 400 m winners: (United States) Michael Cherry (m) / (United States) Shamier Little (f)
  - Women's 800 m winner: (United Kingdom) Adelle Tracey
  - Men's 1 Mile winner: (Algeria) Takieddine Hedeilli
  - 60 m Hurdles winners: (Jamaica) Omar McLeod (m) / (United Kingdom) Tiffany Porter (f)
  - High Jump winners: (United States) Shelby McEwen (m) / (United States) Vashti Cunningham (f)
  - Men's Long Jump winner: (United States) Marquis Dendy
  - Women's Pole Vault winner: (United States) Sandi Morris
- 21 February: American Track League 4 in (United States) Fayetteville
  - 60 m winners: (United States) Zach Jewell (m) / (United Kingdom) Daryll Neita (f)
  - Women's 200 m winner: (United States) Allyson Felix
  - Men's 300 m winner: (Trinidad and Tobago) Asa Guevara
  - 400 m winners: (United States) Wilbert London (m) / (United States) Shamier Little (f)
  - 800 m winners: (Kenya) Michael Saruni (m) / (United States) Heather MacLean (f)
  - 60 m Hurdles winners: (United States) Michael Dickson (m) / (Jamaica) Danielle Williams (f)
  - Pole Vault winners: (United States) Andrew Irwin (m) / (United States) Olivia Gruver (f)
  - Men's Long Jump winner: (United States) Marquis Dendy
  - Shot Put winners: (United States) Ryan Crouser (m) / (United States) Raven Saunders (f)
- 27 February: All Star Perche in (France) Aubière
  - Winners: (France) Renaud Lavillenie (m) / (United Kingdom) Holly Bradshaw (f)

Bronze

- 5 February: Hvězdy v Nehvizdech in (Czech Republic) Nehvizdy
  - High Jump winners: (Belgium) Thomas Carmoy (m) / (Saint Lucia) Levern Spencer (f)
  - Long Jump winners: (United Kingdom) Reynold Banigo (m) / (Slovenia) Neja Filipič (f)
  - Men's Shot Put winner: (Czech Republic) Tomáš Staněk
- 6 & 7 February: Tallinn Indoor Meeting in (Estonia) Tallinn
  - Men's Heptathlon winner: (Estonia) Risto Lillemets
  - Women's Pentathlon winner: (Poland) Adrianna Sułek
- 7 February: PSD Bank Meeting in (Germany) Dortmund
  - 60 m winners: (Netherlands) Joris van Gool (m) / (Germany) Jennifer Montag (f)
  - Women's 400 m winner: (Germany) Laura Müller
  - 800 m winners: (Sweden) Andreas Kramer (m) / (Germany) Julia Swelam (f)
  - 1500 m winners: (Kenya) Kumari Taki (m) / (Germany) Caterina Granz (f)
  - Women's 2000 m Steeplechase winner: (Germany) Gesa Felicitas Krause
  - 60 m Hurdles winners: (Spain) Orlando Ortega (m) / (Belgium) Eline Berings (f)
  - Men's Pole Vault winner: (Philippines) Ernest Obiena
  - Women's Long Jump winner: (Sweden) Khaddi Sagnia
- 12 February: Orlen Cup in (Poland) Łódź
  - 60 m winners: (United States) Mike Rodgers (m) / (Poland) Ewa Swoboda (f)
  - 60 m Hurdles winners: (United States) Jarret Eaton (m) / (United States) Christina Clemons (f)
  - Women's High Jump winner: (Italy) Alessia Trost
  - Men's Pole Vault winner: (United States) Sam Kendricks
  - Men's Shot Put winner: (Poland) Michał Haratyk
- 13 February: CMCM Indoor Meeting in Luxembourg
  - Women's 50 m winner: (France) Floriane Gnafoua
  - Women's 60 m winner: (Germany) Jennifer Montag
  - 800 m winners: (Kenya) Collins Kipruto (m) / (Germany) Christina Hering (f)
  - 1500 m winners: (Luxembourg) Charles Grethen (m) / (Kenya) Josephine Chelangat Kiplangat (f)
  - 60 m Hurdles winners: (United Kingdom) Andrew Pozzi (m) / (Germany) Ricarda Lobe (f)
  - Men's High Jump winner: (Belgium) Thomas Carmoy
  - Women's Long Jump winner: (France) Hilary Kpatcha
  - Men's Shot Put winner: (Luxembourg) Bob Bertemes
- 13 February: IFAM Gent Indoor in (Belgium) Ghent
  - 60 m winners: (Denmark) Kojo Musah (m) / (Belgium) Rani Rosius (f)
  - 400 m winners: (Italy) Vladimir Aceti (m) / (Romania) Andrea Miklós (f)
  - Men's 600 m winner: (France) Pierre-Ambroise Bosse
  - 800 m winners: (France) Benjamin Robert (m) / (Republic of Ireland) Nadia Power (f)
  - 1500 m winners: (Kenya) Vincent Kibet Keter (m) / (Belgium) Elise Vanderelst (f)
  - Men's 3000 m winner: (Belgium) Isaac Kimeli
  - 60 m Hurdles winners: (Netherlands) Liam Van Der Schaaf (m) / (Spain) Teresa Errandonea (f)
  - Long Jump winners: (Spain) Eusebio Cáceres (m) / (Cyprus) Filippa Fotopoulou (f)
  - High Jump winners: (Bulgaria) Tihomir Ivanov (m) / (Belgium) Merel Maes (f)
  - Pole Vault winners: (United States) Cole Walsh (m) / (Slovenia) Tina Šutej (f)
- 14 February: Meeting de l'Eure in (France) Val-de-Reuil
  - 60 m winners: (United States) Mike Rodgers (m) / (United States) Javianne Oliver (f)
  - 400 m winners: (Chad) Bachir Mahamat (m) / (Belgium) Cynthia Bolingo (f)
  - Women's 800 m winner: (Ethiopia) Kudaf Tsegay
  - 1500 m winners: (Ethiopia) Getnet Wale (m) / (Republic of Ireland) Michelle Finn (f)
  - 60 m Hurdles winners: (United States) Grant Holloway (m) / (Belarus) Elvira Herman (f)
  - Men's Long Jump winner: (France) Grégoire Villain
  - Men's Triple Jump winner: (Burkina Faso) Hugues Fabrice Zango
  - High Jump winners: (France) Sébastien Micheau (m) / (Ukraine) Iryna Herashchenko
  - Men's Pole Vault winner: (United States) Chris Nilsen
- 24 February: Serbian Open Indoor Meeting 2021 in (Serbia) Belgrade
  - 60 m winners: (Italy) Massimiliano Ferraro (m) / (Switzerland) Salomé Kora (f)
  - 400 m winners: (Romania) Robert Parge (m) / (Romania) Andrea Miklós (f)
  - Men's 1500 m winner: (Bulgaria) Mitko Tsenov
  - 60 m Hurdles winners: (Serbia) Luca Trgovčević (m) / (Romania) Anamaria Nesteriuc (f)
  - Long Jump winners: (Albania) Izmir Smajlaj (m) / (Serbia) Ivana Španović (f)
  - Women's High Jump winner: (United Kingdom) Morgan Lake
  - Men's Shot Put winner: (Serbia) Armin Sinančević
  - Men's Pole Vault winner: (Sweden) Armand Duplantis

=== 2021 World Athletics Continental Tour ===
Bronze

- 6 February: International Track Meet in (New Zealand) Christchurch
  - 200 m winners: (New Zealand) Edward Osei-Nketia (m) / (New Zealand) Georgia Hulls (f)
  - Women's 800 m winner: (New Zealand) Camille Buscomb
  - Men's 1500 m winner: (New Zealand) Hamish Carson
  - 400 m Hurdles winners: (New Zealand) Cameron French (m) / (New Zealand) Portia Bing (f)
  - Men's 3000 m Steeplechase winner: (New Zealand) Niam Macdonald
  - Women's Long Jump winner: (New Zealand) Tegan Duffy
  - Men's Triple Jump winner: (New Zealand) Andrew Allan
  - High Jump winners: (New Zealand) Hamish Kerr (m) / (New Zealand) Keeley O'Hagan (f)
  - Shot Put winners: (New Zealand) Jacko Gill (m) / (New Zealand) Valerie Adams (f)
  - Discus Throw winners: (New Zealand) Connor Bell (m) / (New Zealand) Savannah Scheen (f)
  - Hammer Throw winners: (New Zealand) Anthony Nobilo (m) / (New Zealand) Lauren Bruce (f)
- 27 February: Sir Graeme Douglas International in (New Zealand) Auckland
  - 100 m winners: (New Zealand) Edward Osei-Nketia (m) / (New Zealand) Zoe Hobbs (f)
  - 400 m winners: (New Zealand) Hamish Gill (m) / (New Zealand) Jordyn Blake (f)
  - Men's 800 m winner: (New Zealand) James Preston
  - Women's 1500 m winner: (New Zealand) Camille Buscomb
  - Men's 110 m Hurdles winner: (New Zealand) Tom Moloney
  - Women's 100 m Hurdles winner: (New Zealand) Amy Robertson
  - Men's Long Jump winner: (New Zealand) Felix McDonald
  - Women's Triple Jump winner: (New Zealand) Anna Thomson
  - Men's High Jump winner: (New Zealand) Hamish Kerr
  - Pole Vault winners: (New Zealand) Ettiene Du Preez (m) / (New Zealand) Imogen Ayris (f)
  - Shot Put winners: (New Zealand) Tom Walsh (m) / (New Zealand) Valerie Adams (f)
  - Women's Javelin Throw winner: (New Zealand) Tori Peeters
- 11 March: Canberra Track Classic in (Australia) Canberra
  - 100 m winners: (Australia) Rohan Browning (m) / (Australia) Hana Basic (f)
  - 400 m winners: (Australia) Alex Beck (m) / (Australia) Angeline Blackburn (f)
  - 800 m winners: (Australia) Peter Bol (m) / (Australia) Catriona Bisset (f)
  - 1500 m winners: (Australia) Jye Edwards (m) / (Australia) Linden Hall (f)
  - Men's 110 m Hurdles winner: (Australia) Nicholas Hough
  - Women's 100 m Hurdles winner: (Australia) Abbie Taddeo
  - 400 m Hurdles winner: (Australia) Chris Douglas (m) / (Australia) Lauren Wells (f)
  - Long Jump winners: (Australia) Chris Mitrevski (m) / (Australia) Annie Mcguire (f)
  - High Jump winners: (Australia) Joel Baden (m) / (Australia) Nicola McDermott (f)
  - Javelin Throw winners: (Australia) Liam O'Brien (m) / (Australia) Mackenzie Little (f)

=== NACAC ===
- 23 & 24 April: 2021 NACAC Cross Country Championships and 2021 Central American Race Walking Championships in Guatemala City

==== NACAC Area Permit Meetings ====
- 18 – 20 March: Spring Break Classic Invitational in (Puerto Rico) Carolina (APM #1)
- 20 March: Velocity Fest #8 in (Jamaica) Kingston (APM #2)
- 17 April: Velocity Fest #9 in (Jamaica) Kingston (APM #3)

=== EA Athletics ===
- 13 February: Balkan U20 Indoor Championships in (Bulgaria) Sofia
  - 60 m winners: (Romania) Beniamin Duicu (m) / (Slovenia) Zala Istenič (f)
  - 400 m winners: (Romania) Denis Simon Toma (m) / (Ukraine) Tatiana Kharashchuk (f)
  - 800 m winners: (Romania) Márk Fándly (m) / (Slovenia) Veronika Sadek (f)
  - 1500 m winners: (Turkey) Devrim Kazan (m) / (Romania) Talida Sfârghiu (f)
  - 3000 m winners: (Austria) Emil Bezecny (m) / (Romania) Mădălina Sîrbu (f)
  - 60 m Hurdles winners: (Turkey) Demir Ayetullah (m) / (Croatia) Klara Koščak (f)
  - Long Jump winners: (Armenia) Gor Beglaryan (m) / (Ukraine) Mariia Horielova (f)
  - Triple Jump winners: (Ukraine) Oleksandr Aiko (m) / (Serbia) Jovana Gnjatović (f)
  - High Jump winners: (Ukraine) Roman Petruk (m) / (Cyprus) Styliana Ioannidou (f)
  - Pole Vault winners: (Turkey) Sedat Cacim (m) / (Slovenia) Ula Bohorč (f)
  - Shot Put winners: (Kosovo) Muhamet Ramadani (m) / (Turkey) Akyol Pınar (f)
  - 4 × 400 m winners: Turkey (m) / Slovenia (f)
- 20 February: 2021 Balkan Athletics Indoor Championships in Istanbul
  - 60 m winners: (Turkey) Kayhan Özer (m) / (Bulgaria) Inna Eftimova (f)
  - 400 m winners: (Turkey) İlyas Çanakçı (m) / (Romania) Andrea Miklós (f)
  - 800 m winners: (Ukraine) Oleh Myronets (m) / (Ukraine) Svitlana Zhulzhyk (f)
  - 1500 m winners: (Bulgaria) Mitko Tsenov (m) / (Slovenia) Maruša Mišmaš (f)
  - 3000 m winners: (North Macedonia) Dario Ivanovski (m) / (Slovenia) Klara Lukan (f)
  - 60 m Hurdles winners: (Turkey) Mikdat Sevler (m) / (Romania) Anamaria Nesteriuc (f)
  - Long Jump winners: (Albania) Izmir Smajlaj (m) / (Serbia) Ivana Španović (f)
  - Triple Jump winners: (Azerbaijan) Nazim Babayev (m) / (Turkey) Tuğba Danışmaz (f)
  - High Jump winners: (Bulgaria) Tihomir Ivanov (m) / (Montenegro) Marija Vuković (f)
  - Pole Vault winners: (Turkey) Ersu Şaşma (m) / (Ukraine) Iana Gladiichuk (f)
  - Shot Put winners: (Serbia) Armin Sinančević (m) / (Turkey) Emel Dereli (f)
  - 4 × 400 m winners: Turkey (Akın Özyürek, Ismail Nezir, Ali Aksu, Oğuzhan Kaya) (m) / Ukraine (Alina Lohvynenko, Viktoriya Tkachuk, Anastasiia Bryzgina, Anna Ryzhykova) (f)
- 4 – 7 March: 2021 European Athletics Indoor Championships in (Poland) Toruń

==== 2021 European Athletics Outdoor Area Permit Meetings ====
- 24 May: 36eme Meeting International Athletisme Montgeron-Essonne in (France) Montgeron (APM No. 1)

=== 2020–2021 Oceania Area Permit Meetings ===
- 18 December 2020: Night of 5's in (New Zealand) Auckland (APM No. 1)
  - 100 m winners: (New Zealand) Edward Osei-Nketia (m) / (New Zealand) Zoe Hobbs (f)
  - 800 m winners: (New Zealand) James Harding (m) / (New Zealand) Joanna Poland (f)
  - 5000 m winners: (New Zealand) Eric Speakman (m) / (New Zealand) Lydia O'Donnell (f)
  - 400 m Hurdles winners: (New Zealand) Cameron French (m) / (New Zealand) Anna Percy (f)
  - High Jump winners: (New Zealand) Hamish Kerr (m) / (New Zealand) Josie Taylor (f)
  - Pole Vault winners: (New Zealand) Max Attwell (m) / (New Zealand) Olivia McTaggart (f)
  - Shot Put winners: (New Zealand) Jacko Gill (m) / (New Zealand) Maddi Wesche (f)
  - Discus Throw winners: (New Zealand) Alexander Parkinson (m) / (New Zealand) Savannah Scheen (f)
  - Hammer Throw winners: (New Zealand) Anthony Nobilo (m) / (New Zealand) Julia Ratcliffe (f)
- 23 January: Potts Classic in (New Zealand) Hastings (APM No. 2)
  - 100 m winners: (New Zealand) Tiaan Whelpton (m) / (New Zealand) Zoe Hobbs (f)
  - 800 m winners: (New Zealand) James Preston (m) / (New Zealand) Rebekah Greene (f)
  - 3000m Steeplechase winners: (New Zealand) Samuel Tanner (m) / (New Zealand) Kara MacDermid (f)
  - Long Jump winners: (New Zealand) Angus Lyver (m) / (New Zealand) Mariah Ririnui (f)
  - Pole Vault winners: (New Zealand) James Steyn (m) / (New Zealand) Olivia McTaggart (f)
  - Shot Put winners: (New Zealand) Tom Walsh (m) / (New Zealand) Valerie Adams (f)
  - Discus Throw winners: (New Zealand) Connor Bell (m) / (New Zealand) Savannah Scheen (f)
  - Hammer Throw winners: (New Zealand) Anthony Nobilo (m) / (New Zealand) Lauren Bruce (f)
- 26 January: Zatopek Classic in (Australia) Melbourne (APM No. 3)
  - 800 m winners: (Australia) Jeffrey Riseley (m) / (Australia) Catriona Bisset (f)
  - 1500 m winners: (Australia) Jordan Williamsz (m) / (Australia) Linden Hall
  - 3000 m winners: (Australia) Adam Spencer (m) / (Australia) Abbey Caldwell (f)
  - 10000 m winners: (Australia) Brett Robinson (m) / (Australia) Rose Davies (f)
  - 400 m Hurdles winners: (Australia) Conor Fry (m) / (Australia) Sara Klein (f)
  - Pole Vault winners: (Australia) James Woods (m) / (Australia) Cassidy Bradshaw (f)
  - Long Jump winners: (Australia) Darcy Roper (m) / (Australia) Mia Scerri (f)
- 30 January: Cooks Classic in (New Zealand) Whanganui (APM No. 4)
  - 200 m winners: (New Zealand) Edward Osei-Nketia (m) / (New Zealand) Natasha Eady (f)
  - 400 m winners: (New Zealand) James Robertson (m) / (New Zealand) Camryn Smart (f)
  - 1 Mile Run winners: (New Zealand) Samuel Tanner (m) / (New Zealand) Camille Buscomb (f)
  - 400 m Hurdles winners: (New Zealand) Cameron French (m) / (New Zealand) Portia Bing (f)
  - High Jump winners: (New Zealand) Hamish Kerr (m) / (New Zealand) Josie Taylor (f)
  - Triple Jump winners: (New Zealand) Scott Thomson (m) / (New Zealand) Anna Thomsom (f)
  - Shot Put winners: (New Zealand) Jacko Gill (m) / (New Zealand) Lisa Adams (f)
  - Women's Hammer Throw winner: (New Zealand) Lauren Bruce
  - Javelin Throw winners: (New Zealand) Ben Langton Burnell (m) / (New Zealand) Tori Peeters (f)
- 13 February: Porritt Classic in (New Zealand) Hamilton (APM No. 5)
  - 200 m winners: (New Zealand) Edward Osei-Nketia (m) / (New Zealand) Georgia Hulls (f)
  - Men's 800 m winner: (New Zealand) James Preston
  - Women's 1500 m winner: (New Zealand) Camille Buscomb
  - Men's 5000 m winner: (New Zealand) Hayden Wilde
  - Men's 110 m Hurdles winner: (New Zealand) Joshua Hawkins
  - Women's 100 m Hurdles winner: (New Zealand) Amy Robertson
  - 400 m Hurdles winners: (New Zealand) Cameron French (m) / (New Zealand) Portia Bing (f)
  - Men's Long Jump winner: (New Zealand) Shay Veitch
  - Women's Triple Jump winner: (New Zealand) Anna Thomson
  - Shot Put winners: (New Zealand) Jacko Gill (m) / (New Zealand) Valerie Adams (f)
  - Women's Hammer Throw winner: (New Zealand) Lauren Bruce
  - Javelin Throw winners: (New Zealand) Ben Langton Burnell (m) / (New Zealand) Tori Peeters (f)
- 20 February: Capital Classic in (New Zealand) Wellington (APM No. 6)
  - 100 m winners: (New Zealand) Edward Osei-Nketia (m) / (New Zealand) Natasha Eady (f)
  - 400 m winners: (New Zealand) Hamish Gill (m) / (New Zealand) Camryn Smart (f)
  - Women's 800 m winner: (New Zealand) Katherine Camp
  - Men's 1500 m winner: (New Zealand) Julian Oakley
  - Men's 110 m Hurdles winner: (New Zealand) James Sandilands
  - Women's 100 m Hurdles winner: (New Zealand) Amy Robertson
  - Women's Long Jump winner: (New Zealand) Lili Szabó (f)
  - Men's Triple Jump winner: (New Zealand) Andrew Allan
  - High Jump winners: (New Zealand) Hamish Kerr (m) / (New Zealand) Keeley O'Hagan (f)
  - Pole Vault winners: (New Zealand) Ettiene du Preez (m) / (New Zealand) Olivia McTaggart (f)
  - Discus Throw winners: (New Zealand) Connor Bell (m) / (New Zealand) Savannah Scheen (f)
  - Hammer Throw winners: (New Zealand) Antony Nobilo (m) / (New Zealand) Lauren Bruce (f)
- 25 February: Summer Super Series in (Australia) Canberra (APM No. 7)
  - 100 m winners: (Australia) Jack Hale (m) / (Australia) Hana Basic (f)
  - Men's 200 m winner: (Australia) Alex Hartmann
  - 800 m winners: (Australia) Peter Bol (m) / (Australia) Catriona Bisset (f)
  - Men's 110 m Hurdles winner: (Australia) Nicholas Hough
  - Women's 100 m Hurdles winner: (Australia) Hannah Jones
  - 3000 m Steeplechase winners: (Australia) Ben Buckingham (m) / (Australia) Cara Feain-Ryan (f)
  - Long Jump winners: (Australia) Chris Mitrevski (m) / (Australia) Annie McGuire (f)
  - Triple Jump winners: (Australia) Ayo Ore (m) / (Australia) Chloe Grenade (f)
  - High Jump winners: (Australia) Brandon Starc (m) / (Australia) Nicola McDermott (f)
  - Men's Shot Put winner: (Australia) Damien Birkinhead
  - Hammer Throw winners: (Australia) Costa Kousparis (m) / (Australia) Alexandra Hulley (f)
  - Women's Javelin Throw winner: (Australia) Mackenzie Little

== Badminton ==
- 16 – 20 February: 2021 European Mixed Team Badminton Championships in (Finland) Vantaa
  - In the final, Denmark defeated France, 3–0, to win their eightteeth European Mixed Team Badminton Championships.
- 26 – 29 April: 2021 All Africa Mixed Team Championships in (South Africa) TBD
- 27 April – 2 May: 2021 Badminton Asia Championships in (China) TBD
- 27 April – 2 May: 2021 European Badminton Championships in (Ukraine) Kyiv
- 27 April – 2 May: 2021 Pan Am Badminton Championships in Guatemala City
- 30 April – 2 May: 2021 African Badminton Championships in (South Africa) TBD
- 12 – 19 December: 2021 BWF World Championships in (Spain) Huelva
- 2021 BWF Para-Badminton World Championships in Japan
- 2021 BWF World Junior Championships in Chengdu, China

=== 2021 BWF World Tour ===
Super 1000

- 17 – 21 March: 2021 All England Open in (United Kingdom) Birmingham

Super 750

- 31 March – 4 April: 2021 Malaysia Open in Kuala Lumpur

Super 500

- 6 – 11 April: 2021 Malaysia Masters in Kuala Lumpur
- 13 – 18 April: 2021 Singapore Open in Singapore

Super 300

- 2 – 7 March: 2021 Swiss Open in (Switzerland) Basel
  - Men's Singles: (Denmark) Viktor Axelsen defeated (Thailand) Kunlavut Vitidsarn, 21–16, 21–6.
  - Women's Singles: (Spain) Carolina Marín defeated (India) P. V. Sindhu, 21–12, 21–5.
  - Men's Doubles: (Denmark) Kim Astrup & (Denmark) Anders Skaarup Rasmussen defeated (Germany) Mark Lamsfuß & (Germany) Marvin Emil Seidel, 21–16, 21–11.
  - Women's Doubles: (Malaysia) Pearly Tan Koong Le & (Malaysia) Thinaah Muralitharan defeated (Bulgaria) Gabriela Stoeva & (Bulgaria) Stefani Stoeva, 21–19, 21–12.
  - Mixed Doubles: (France) Thom Gicquel & (France) Delphine Delrue defeated (Denmark) Mathias Christiansen & (Denmark) Alexandra Bøje, 21–19, 21–19

Super 100

- 23 – 28 March: 2021 Orléans Masters in France

=== 2021 BWF Continental Circuit ===
Africa

- 25 – 28 February: Uganda International in Kampala
  - Men's Singles: (India) Varun Kapur defeated (India) S. Sankar Muthusamy Subramanian, 21–18, 16–21, 21–17.
  - Women's Singles: (India) Malvika Bansod defeated (India) Anupama Upadhyaya, 17–21, 25–23, 21–10.
  - Men's Doubles: No competition
  - Women's Doubles: (Uganda) Husina Kobugabe & (Uganda) Mable Namakoye defeated (Uganda) Fadilah Mohamed Rafi & (Uganda) Tracy Naluwooza, 21–9, 21–17.
  - Mixed Doubles: (Uganda) Israel Wanagalya & (Uganda) Betty Apio defeated (Uganda) Brian Kasirye & (Uganda) Husina Kobugabe, 21–13, 22–20.

== Bandy ==
- 2021 Bandy World Championship
- 2021 Bandy World Cup
- Bandy World Championship U-21 2021
- Bandy World Championship U-19 2021
- Bandy World Championship U-17 2021
- Bandy World Championship U-15 2021
- Bandy World Championships for Girls U-17 2021

== Baseball ==
- 2021 U-23 Baseball World Cup
- 2021 World Junior Baseball Championship
- 2021 World Youth Baseball Championship
- 2021 World 12U Baseball Championship

=== Major League Baseball ===
- 1 April – 3 October: 2021 Major League Baseball season
- 11–13 July: 2021 Major League Baseball draft
- 13 July: 2021 Major League Baseball All-Star Game at Coors Field in (Colorado) Denver
- 26 October: 2021 World Series

=== 2021 Little League Baseball World Series ===
- 19 – 29 August: Little League World Series in (Pennsylvania) South Williamsport at both the Little League Volunteer Stadium and Howard J. Lamade Stadium

== Basketball ==
=== National Basketball Association ===
- 22 December – 16 May: 2020-21 NBA season
- 7 March: 2021 NBA All-Star Game at State Farm Arena in (United States) Atlanta, Georgia
  - All-Star Game: Team LeBron defeated Team Durant, 170 – 150.
  - Skills Challenge: Domantas Sabonis (Indiana) defeated Nikola Vučević (Orlando)
  - Three Point Contest: Stephen Curry (Golden State)
  - Slam Dunk Contest: Anfernee Simons (Portland)
- 22 May – 21 July: 2021 NBA playoffs (Wisconsin) Milwaukee Bucks defeated (Arizona) Phoenix Suns 4–2 in the 2021 NBA Finals.
- 29 July: 2021 NBA draft

=== National Collegiate Athletic Association ===
- 16 March – 5 April: 2021 NCAA Division I men's basketball tournament
- 19 March – 4 April: 2021 NCAA Division I women's basketball tournament

=== FIBA ===
- 17–29 August: 2021 FIBA Asia Cup
- 17–29 August: AfroBasket 2021 in Rwanda
- 6 February: 2021 FIBA Intercontinental Cup
- 3–11 July: 2021 FIBA Under-19 Basketball World Cup
- 7–15 August: 2021 FIBA Under-19 Women's Basketball World Cup

=== FIBA Europe ===
National teams

- 2–19 September: EuroBasket 2021 in Czech Republic, Georgia, Germany and Italy

Club teams

- 15 September 2020 – 9 May: 2020–21 Basketball Champions League
- 29 September 2020 – 14 April: 2020–21 EuroCup Basketball
- 1 October 2020 – 9 April: 2020–21 EuroLeague (Regular season)
- 28 October 2020 – 18 April: 2020–21 EuroLeague Women
- 9 December 2020 – 11 April: 2020–21 EuroCup Women
  - In the final, (Spain) Valencia Basket defeated (Italy) Reyer Venezia, 82–81, to win their 1st Women EuroCup.
  - (Hungary) Atomerőmű KSC Szekszárd took third place.
- 6 January – TBD 2020–21 FIBA Europe Cup

Regional competitions

- 2 October 2020 – 16 April: 2020–21 ABA League First Division (Regular season)
- 3 October 2020 – 11 April: 2020–21 Latvian–Estonian Basketball League
  - In the final, (Estonia) BC Kalev/Cramo defeated (Latvia) VEF Rīga, 86–75, to win their 1st Latvian–Estonian Basketball League.
  - (Latvia) BK Ogre took third place.
- 13 October 2020 – April: 2020–21 BIBL season
- 14 October 2020 – 3 March: 2020–21 WABA League (Regular season)
  - 20–21 March: WABA League (Final Four)
- 9 November 2020 – TBD: 2020–21 ABA League Second Division
- TBD: 2020–21 Alpe Adria Cup
- 6 – 14 April: 2020–21 Liga Unike

=== FIBA Americas ===
National teams

- 24 – 28 March: 2021 Centrobasket Women in El Salvador
  - Round Robin Final Placements: 1st. Puerto Rico, 2nd. Virgin Islands, 3rd. Dominican Republic, 4th. El Salvador, 5th. Costa Rica

Club teams

- 31 January – 14 April: 2020–21 BCLA season

=== FIBA 3X3 ===
- 10 – 12 September: 2021 FIBA 3x3 Europe Cup in (France) Paris
- 12–14 November: 2021 FIBA 3x3 AmeriCup in (United States) Miami, Florida

== Beach handball ==
- 2021 IHF Youth Beach Handball World Championship (Postponed to 2022)

== Beach soccer ==
- 2021 FIFA Beach Soccer World Cup (Russia)

== Beach tennis ==
=== 2021 ITF Beach Tennis World Tour ===
B10

- 15 January: BTWT #1 in (United Arab Emirates) Dubai
  - Men's: (Puerto Rico) Vladimir Helmut & (Puerto Rico) Javier Méndez defeated (South Africa) Tiaan Bredenkamp & (Spain) Emilio Misas, 6–1, 6–0.
  - Women's: (Spain) Marta Apraiz & (Morocco) Safaa Bahman defeated (Venezuela) Jessica Palma & (Slovakia) Rebeka Zálešáková, 6–3, 6–3.
- 16 January: BTWT #2 in (United States) Clearwater #1
  - Men's: (Venezuela) Diego Guzmán & (Aruba) Aksel Samardzic defeated (Puerto Rico) Luis Miguel Reyes Peñalverty & (United States) Carlos Rivera, 6–3, 1–6, [12–10].
  - Women's: (United States) Angela Bemquerer & (United States) Larissa Boechat defeated (Brazil) Mayra Kaefer & (United States) Emilie Katz, 4–6, 7–6^{(7–5)}, [10–8].
- 17 January: BTWT #3 in (United States) Clearwater #2
  - Men's: (Venezuela) Diego Guzmán & (Aruba) Aksel Samardzic defeated (Puerto Rico) Luis Miguel Reyes Peñalverty & (United States) Carlos Rivera, 6–1, 6–3.
  - Women's: (Brazil) Mayra Kaefer & (United States) Emilie Katz defeated (Venezuela) Mariandreina Morales & (United States) Sherilyn Villalobos, 6–1, 6–3.
- 15 & 16 February: BTWT #4 in (Spain) Las Palmas
  - Men's: (Spain) Javier González Rosales & (Spain) Santi Puente defeated (Spain) Alvaro García González & (Spain) Carlos Rodríguez Perera, 7–6^{(7–3)}, 7–5.
  - Women's: (Spain) Inés León Ojeda & (Spain) Daniela Rodríguez Perera defeated (Poland) Nicole Borzęcka & (Poland) Alina Robok, 6–3, 7–6^{(7–1)}.
- 13 March: BTWT #5 in (Portugal) Ponta Delgada
- 20 March: BTWT #6 in (Portugal) Angra do Heroísmo

B50

- 22 & 23 January: BTWT #1 in (United Arab Emirates) Dubai
  - Men's: (Russia) Nikita Burmakin & (Italy) Paolo Tronci defeated (Puerto Rico) Vladimir Helmut & (Puerto Rico) Javier Méndez, 6–1, 6–2.
  - Women's: (Spain) Marta Apraiz & (Slovakia) Katarína Páleníková defeated (Russia) Ekaterina Kamenetckaia & (Russia) Elena Koval, 6–2, 6–4.
- 12 – 14 February: BTWT #2 in (Spain) Las Palmas
  - Men's: (Spain) Victor López Rubio & (Spain) Saulo Tejada Dámaso defeated (Netherlands) Joeri Ertner & (Netherlands) Bo Groot Antink, 6–4, 6–3.
  - Women's: (Spain) Ariadna Costa Graell & (Spain) Eva Fernández Palos defeated (Spain) Carolina Miranda Naranjo & (Spain) Anely Ruiz Campos, 6–2, 6–3.

== Beach volleyball ==
- 2021 FIVB Beach Volleyball U21 World Championships
- 2021 FIVB Beach Volleyball U19 World Championships

=== 2021 FIVB Beach Volleyball World Tour ===
1 Star

- 26 – 28 February: #1 Competition in (Qatar) Doha (Men's only)
  - Winners: (Qatar) Cherif Younousse & (Qatar) Ahmed Tijan

4 Stars

- 8 – 13 March: #1 Competition in (Qatar) Doha

== Biathlon ==
- 24 – 31 January: Biathlon European Championships 2021 in (Poland) Duszniki-Zdrój
  - Men's 20 km Individual winner: (Latvia) Andrejs Rastorgujevs
  - Women's 15 km Individual winner: (Poland) Monika Hojnisz
  - Men's 10 km Sprint winner: (Switzerland) Martin Jäger
  - Women's 7.5 Sprint winner: (Latvia) Baiba Bendika
  - Men's 12.5 km Pursuit winner: (Ukraine) Artem Pryma
  - Women's 10 km Pursuit winner: (Poland) Kamila Żuk
  - Single Mixed Relay winners: Germany (Stefanie Scherer & Justus Strelow)
  - 4x6 km Mixed Relay winners: Norway (Emilie Ågheim Kalkenberg, Åsne Skrede, Erlend Bjøntegaard, Sivert Guttorm Bakken)
- 9 – 21 February: Biathlon World Championships 2021 in (Slovenia) Pokljuka
  - Men's 10 km sprint winner: (Sweden) Martin Ponsiluoma
  - Women's 7.5 km sprint winner: (Norway) Tiril Eckhoff
  - Men's 12.5 km pursuit winner: (France) Émilien Jacquelin
  - Women's 10 km pursuit winner: (Norway) Tiril Eckhoff
  - Men's 20 km individual winner: (Norway) Sturla Holm Lægreid
  - Women's 15 km individual winner: (Czech Republic) Markéta Davidová
  - Men's 15 km mass start winner: (Norway) Sturla Holm Lægreid
  - Women's 12.5 km mass start winner: (Austria) Lisa Theresa Hauser
  - Men's 4 × 7.5 km relay winners: Norway (Sturla Holm Lægreid, Tarjei Bø, Johannes Thingnes Bø, Vetle Sjåstad Christiansen)
  - Women's 4 × 6 km relay winners: Norway (Ingrid Landmark Tandrevold, Tiril Eckhoff, Ida Lien, Marte Olsbu Røiseland)
  - Mixed 4 × 7.5 km M+W relay winners: Norway (Sturla Holm Lægreid, Johannes Thingnes Bø, Tiril Eckhoff, Marte Olsbu Røiseland)
  - Mixed 6 km M + 7.5 km W single relay winners: France (Antonin Guigonnat & Julia Simon)
- 24 February – 7 March: Biathlon Junior World Championships 2021 in (Austria) Obertilliach
- 2021 Summer Biathlon World Championships in Nové Město na Moravě, Czech Republic

=== 2020–21 Biathlon World Cup ===
- 27 – 29 November 2020: WC #1 in (Finland) Kontiolahti #1
  - Men's 20 km Individual winner: (Norway) Sturla Holm Lægreid
  - Women's 15 km Individual winner: (Italy) Dorothea Wierer
  - Men's 10 km Sprint winner: (Norway) Johannes Thingnes Bø
  - Women's 7.5 Sprint winner: (Sweden) Hanna Öberg
- 30 November – 6 December 2020: WC #2 in (Finland) Kontiolahti #2
  - Men's 10 km Sprint winner: (Norway) Tarjei Bø
  - Women's 7.5 Sprint winner: (Sweden) Hanna Öberg
  - Men's 12.5 km Pursuit winner: (Sweden) Sebastian Samuelsson
  - Women's 10 km Pursuit winner: (Norway) Tiril Eckhoff
  - Men's 4x7.5 km Relay winners: Norway (Sturla Holm Lægreid, Vetle Sjåstad Christiansen, Tarjei Bø, Johannes Thingnes Bø)
  - Women's 4x6 km Relay winners: Sweden (Johanna Skottheim, Mona Brorsson, Elvira Öberg, Hanna Öberg)
- 11 – 13 December 2020: WC #3 in (Austria) Hochfilzen #1
  - Men's 10 km Sprint winner: (Norway) Johannes Dale
  - Women's 7.5 Sprint winner: (Belarus) Dzinara Alimbekava
  - Men's 12.5 km Pursuit winner: (France) Quentin Fillon Maillet
  - Women's 10 km Pursuit winner: (Norway) Marte Olsbu Røiseland
- 17 – 20 December 2020: WC #4 in (Austria) Hochfilzen #2
  - Men's 10 km Sprint winner: (Norway) Sturla Holm Lægreid
  - Women's 7.5 Sprint winner: (Norway) Tiril Eckhoff
  - Men's 12.5 km Pursuit winner: (Norway) Sturla Holm Lægreid
  - Women's 10 km Pursuit winner: (Norway) Tiril Eckhoff
  - Men's 15 km Mass Start winner: (Germany) Arnd Peiffer
  - Women's 12.5 km Mass Start winner: (Norway) Marte Olsbu Røiseland
- 4 – 10 January: WC #5 in (Germany) Oberhof #1
  - Men's 10 km Sprint winner: (Norway) Johannes Thingnes Bø
  - Women's 7.5 km Sprint winner: (Norway) Tiril Eckhoff
  - Men's 12.5 km Pursuit winner: (Norway) Sturla Holm Lægreid
  - Women's 10 km Pursuit winner: (Norway) Tiril Eckhoff
  - Single Mixed Relay winners: France (Julia Simon & Émilien Jacquelin)
  - 4x6 km Mixed Relay winners: Russia (Uliana Kaisheva, Svetlana Mironova, Alexander Loginov, Eduard Latypov)
- 11 – 17 January: WC #5 in Oberhof #2
  - Men's 10 km Sprint winner: (Norway) Johannes Thingnes Bø
  - Women's 7.5 km Sprint winner: (Norway) Tiril Eckhoff
  - Men's 15 km Mass Start winner: (Norway) Tarjei Bø
  - Women's 12.5 km Mass Start winner: (France) Julia Simon
  - Men's 4x7.5 km Relay winners: France Simon Desthieux, Quentin Fillon Maillet, Fabien Claude, Émilien Jacquelin)
  - Women's 4x6 km Relay winners: Germany (Vanessa Hinz, Janina Hettich, Denise Herrmann, Franziska Preuß)
- 18 – 24 January: WC #6 in (Italy) Antholz-Anterselva
  - Men's 20 km Individual winner: (Russia) Alexander Loginov
  - Women's 15 km Individual winner: (Austria) Lisa Hauser
  - Men's 15 km Mass Start winner: (Norway) Johannes Thingnes Bø
  - Women's 12.5 km Mass Start winner: (France) Julia Simon
  - Men's 4x7.5 km Relay winners: France Simon Desthieux, Quentin Fillon Maillet, Antonin Guigonnat, Émilien Jacquelin)
  - Women's 4x6 km Relay winners: Russia (Evgeniya Pavlova, Tatiana Akimova, Svetlana Mironova, Uliana Kaisheva)

=== 2020–21 IBU Cup ===
- 11 – 17 January: IBU Cup #1 in Arber #1
  - Men's 10 km Sprint winners: (Norway) Aleksander Fjeld Andersen (No. 1) / (Norway) Filip Fjeld Andersen (No. 2)
  - Women's 7.5 km Sprint winners: (Russia) Tatiana Akimova (2 times)
  - Men's 4x7.5 km Relay winners: Germany (Justus Strelow, Dominic Schmuck, Danilo Riethmüller, Philipp Nawrath)
  - Women's 4x6 km Relay winners: Russia (Valeriia Vasnetcova, Anastasiia Goreeva, Anastasia Shevchenko, Tatiana Akimova)
- 18 – 23 January: IBU Cup #2 in (Germany) Arber #2
  - Men's 15 km Short Individual winner: (Norway) Endre Strømsheim
  - Women's 12.5 km Short Individual winner: (Austria) Tamara Steiner
  - Men's 10 km Sprint winner: (Norway) Filip Fjeld Andersen
  - Women's 7.5 km Sprint winner: (Russia) Valeriia Vasnetcova
  - Single Mixed Relay winners: Norway (Endre Strømsheim & Karoline Erdal)
  - 4x7.5 km Mixed Relay winners: Russia (Said Karimulla Khalili, Daniil Serokhvostov, Anastasiia Goreeva, Valeriia Vasnetcova)

== Bobsleigh & Skeleton ==
- 8 – 10 January: IBSF European Championships 2021 in Winterberg
  - Two-man winners: Germany (Francesco Friedrich & Thorsten Margis)
  - Four-man winners: Germany (Francesco Friedrich, Thorsten Margis, Candy Bauer, Alexander Schüller)
  - Two-woman winners: Germany (Laura Nolte & Deborah Levi)
  - Skeleton winners: (Russia) Aleksandr Tretyakov (m) / (Russia) Elena Nikitina (f)
- 22 – 24 January: IBSF Junior World Championships 2021 in St. Moritz
  - U23 Two-man winners: Romania (Mihai Cristian Tentea & Nicolae Ciprian Daroczi)
  - U23 Two-woman winners: France (Margot Boch & Madison Stringer)
  - Junior Two-man winners: Germany (Hans Peter Hannighofer & Christian Röder)
  - Junior Two-woman winners: Germany (Laura Nolte & Deborah Levi)
  - U23 Four-man winners: Russia (Vyacheslav Popov, Dmitrii Abramov, Andrey Andriyanov, Egor Gryaznov)
  - Junior Four-man winners: Switzerland (Michael Vogt, Silvio Weber, Sandro Michel, Andreas Haas)
  - U20 Skeleton winners: (Germany) Lukas Nydegger (m) / (Russia) Anastasiia Tsyganova (f)
  - Junior Skeleton winners: (Russia) Evgeniy Rukosuev (m) / (Germany) Hannah Neise (f)
- 5 – 14 February: IBSF World Championships 2021 in Lake Placid
  - Two-man winners: Germany (Francesco Friedrich & Alexander Schüller)
  - Four-man winners: Germany (Francesco Friedrich, Thorsten Margis, Candy Bauer, Alexander Schüller)
  - Women's Monobob winner: (United States) Kaillie Humphries
  - Two-woman winners: United States (Kaillie Humphries & Lolo Jones)
  - Skeleton winners: (Germany) Christopher Grotheer (m) / (Germany) Tina Hermann (f)
  - Skeleton mixed team winners: Germany (Tina Hermann & Christopher Grotheer)
- 2021 IBSF Para Sport World Championship
- 2021 World Junior Bobsleigh Championships
- 2021 World Junior Skeleton Championships

=== 2020–21 Bobsleigh World Cup ===
- 20 & 21 November 2020: World Cup #1 in (Latvia) Sigulda #1
  - Two-man winners: Germany (Francesco Friedrich & Thorsten Margis) (No. 1) / Germany (Francesco Friedrich & Alexander Schüller) (No. 2)
  - Two-woman winners: Germany (Mariama Jamanka & Vanessa Mark)
- 28 & 29 November 2020: World Cup #2 in (Latvia) Sigulda #2
  - Two-man winners: Germany (Francesco Friedrich & Thorsten Margis) (No. 1) / Germany (Francesco Friedrich & Alexander Schüller) (No. 2)
  - Two-woman winners: Germany (Laura Nolte & Leonie Fiebig)
- 12 & 13 December 2020: World Cup #3 in (Austria) Innsbruck #1
  - Two-man winners: Germany (Johannes Lochner & Eric Franke) (No. 1) / Germany (Francesco Friedrich & Thorsten Margis) (No. 2)
- 19 & 20 December 2020: World Cup #4 in (Austria) Innsbruck #2
  - Two-man winners: Germany (Francesco Friedrich & Thorsten Margis) (2 times)
  - Two-women winners: Germany (Stephanie Schneider & Leonie Fiebig)
- 8 – 10 January: World Cup #5 in Winterberg
  - Two-man winners: Germany (Francesco Friedrich & Thorsten Margis)
  - Four-man winners: Germany (Francesco Friedrich, Thorsten Margis, Candy Bauer, Alexander Schüller)
  - Two-woman winners: Germany (Laura Nolte & Deborah Levi)
- 16 & 17 January: World Cup #6 in (Switzerland) St. Moritz
  - Two-man winners: Germany (Francesco Friedrich & Alexander Schüller)
  - Four-man winners: Germany (Francesco Friedrich, Thorsten Margis, Martin Grothkopp, Alexander Schüller)
  - Two-women winners: Germany (Stephanie Schneider & Leonie Fiebig)
- 23 & 24 January: World Cup #7 in Königssee
  - Two-man winners: Germany (Francesco Friedrich & Thorsten Margis)
  - Four-man winners: Germany (Francesco Friedrich, Thorsten Margis, Martin Grothkopp, Alexander Schüller)
  - Two-women winners: Germany (Kim Kalicki & Ann-Christin Strack)
- 30 & 31 January: World Cup #8 in (Austria) Innsbruck #3 (final)
  - Two-man winners: Germany (Francesco Friedrich & Alexander Schüller)
  - Four-man winners: Germany (Francesco Friedrich, Thorsten Margis, Candy Bauer, Alexander Schüller)
  - Two-women winners: United States (Kaillie Humphries & Lolo Jones)

=== 2020–21 Skeleton World Cup ===
- 20 November 2020: World Cup #1 in (Latvia) Sigulda #1
  - Winners: (Latvia) Martins Dukurs (m) / (Austria) Janine Flock (f)
- 27 November 2020 World Cup #2 in (Latvia) Sigulda #2
  - Winners: (Latvia) Martins Dukurs (m) / (Austria) Janine Flock (f)
- 11 December 2020: World Cup #3 in (Austria) Innsbruck #1
  - Winners: (Latvia) Martins Dukurs & (Russia) Aleksandr Tretyakov (m) / (Russia) Elena Nikitina (f)
- 18 December 2020: World Cup #4 in (Austria) Innsbruck #2
  - Winners: (Latvia) Martins Dukurs (m) / (Austria) Janine Flock (f)
- 8 January: World Cup #5 in (Germany) Winterberg
  - Winners: (Russia) Aleksandr Tretyakov (m) / (Russia) Elena Nikitina (f)
- 15 January: World Cup #6 in (Switzerland) St. Moritz
  - Winners: (Germany) Alexander Gassner (m) / (Germany) Tina Hermann (f)
- 22 January: World Cup #7 in (Germany) Königssee
  - Winners: (Germany) Alexander Gassner (m) / (Germany) Jacqueline Lölling (f)
- 29 January: World Cup #8 in (Austria) Innsbruck #3 (final)
  - Winners: (Russia) Alexander Tretyakov (m) / (Russia) Elena Nikitina (f)

=== 2020–21 Bobsleigh Europe Cup ===
- 5 & 6 December 2020: EC #1 in Winterberg
  - Two-man winners: Germany (Hans Peter Hannighofer & Christian Roeder) (2 times)
  - Two-women winners: Germany (Stephanie Schneider & Tamara Seer)
- 19 & 20 December 2020: EC #2 in Sigulda
  - Two-man winners: Latvia (Dāvis Kaufmanis & Krists Lindenblats) (No. 1) / Russia (Maksim Andrianov & Maxim Belugin) (No. 2)
  - Two-women winners: Russia (Alena Osipenko & Aleksandra Tarasova) (2 times)
- 7 – 9 January: EC #3 in Altenberg
  - Two-man winners: Germany (Hans Peter Hannighofer & Christian Roeder) (2 times)
  - Two-women winners: Germany (Stephanie Schneider & Claudia Schüßler)
  - Four-man winners: Canada (Christopher Spring, Mark Mlakar, Shaquille Murray-Lawrence, Mike Evelyn)
- 13 – 15 January: EC #4 in (Austria) Innsbruck
  - Two-man winners: Switzerland (Michael Kuonen & Marco Tanner)
  - Two-women winners: Germany (Lisa Buckwitz & Cynthia Kwofie)
  - Four-man winners: Germany (Philipp Zielasko, Joshua Kossmann, Benedikt Hertel, Erec Maximilian Bruckert) (2 times)
- 20 & 21 February: EC #5 in (Germany) Königssee (final)
  - Two-man winners: Romania (Mihai Cristian Tentea & Nicolae Ciprian Daroczi)
  - Two-women winners:
  - Four-man winners:

=== 2021 Bobsleigh North American Cup ===
- 15 – 17 January: NAC #1 in Park City #1
  - Two-man winners: United States (Sam Moeller & Joshua Williamson) (No. 1) / United States (Frank Delduca & Hakeem Abdul-Saboor) (No. 2) / United States (Sam Moeller & Hakeem Abdul-Saboor)
- 21 – 23 January: NAC #2 in Park City #2
  - Two-women winners: United States (Nicole Vogt & Kaysha Love) (No. 1) / United States (Nicole Vogt & Kelsey Kiel) (No. 2) / United States (Nicole Vogt & Colleen Fotsch) (No. 3)
  - Four-man winners: United States (Hunter Church, Charles Volker, Joshua Williamson, Hakeem Abdul-Saboor) (3 times)
- 1 – 4 February: NAC #3 in Lake Placid
  - Two-man winners: United States (Hunter Church & Hakeem Abdul-Saboor) (No. 1) / United States (Hunter Church & Joshua Williamson)
  - Two-women winners:
  - Four-man winners: United States (Hunter Church, Charles Volker, Joshua Williamson, Hakeem Abdul-Saboor) (2 times)

=== 2020–21 Skeleton Europe Cup ===
- 27 & 28 November 2020: EC #1 in (Germany) Winterberg
  - Men's winners: (Germany) Felix Seibel (No. 1) / (Germany) Kilian von Schleinitz (No. 2)
  - Women's winners: (Germany) Sarah Wimmer (2 times)
- 19 December 2020: EC #2 in (Latvia) Sigulda
  - Winners: (Latvia) Krists Netlaus (m) / (Germany) Stefanie Votz (f)
- 13 January: EC #3 in (Germany) Altenberg
  - Winners: (United Kingdom) Matt Weston (m) / (Germany) Corinna Leipold (f)
- 6 February: EC #4 in (Germany) Königssee
  - Winners: (Germany) Cedric Renner (m) / (Germany) Stefanie Votz (f)
- 19 February: EC #5 in (Austria) Innsbruck (final)
  - Winners: (Russia) Evgeniy Rukosuev (m) / (Russia) Alina Tararychenkova (f)

=== 2021 Skeleton Intercontinental Cup ===
- 16 January: IC #1 in (Germany) Altenberg
  - Winners: (Germany) Axel Jungk (m) / (Russia) Elena Nikitina (f)

=== 2021 Skeleton North American Cup ===
- 26 – 28 January: NAC #1 in (United States) Park City #1
  - Men's winners: (United States) John Daly (3 times)
  - Women's winners: (United States) Megan Henry (3 times)
  - 4 & 5 February: NAC #2 in (United States) Lake Placid (final)
  - Men's winners: (United States) John Daly (2 times)
  - Women's winners: (United States) Savannah Graybill (No. 1) / (United States) Mystique Ro (No. 2)

=== 2020–21 Women's Monobob World Series ===
- 5 December 2020: World Series #1 in (Germany) Winterberg
  - Women's Monobob winner: (Russia) Nadezhda Sergeeva
- 12 December 2020: World Series #2 in (Austria) Innsbruck
  - Women's Monobob winner: (Australia) Breeana Walker
- 14 January: World Series #3 in (Austria) Innsbruck
  - Women's Monobob winner: (Austria) Melissa Lotholz
- 15 – 17 January: World Series #4 in (United States) Park City
  - Women's Monobob winners: (United States) Nicole Vogt (2 times) / (Jamaica) Carrie Russell (No. 3)
- 16 January: World Series #5 in (Switzerland) St. Moritz
  - Women's Monobob winner: (United States) Kaillie Humphries
- 23 January: World Series #6 in (Germany) Königssee
  - Women's Monobob winner: (United States) Kaillie Humphries
- 30 January: World Series #7 in (Austria) Innsbruck
  - Women's Monobob winner: (Australia) Breeana Walker
- 1 & 2 February: World Series #8 in (United States) Lake Placid
  - Women's Monobob winners: (United States) Nicole Vogt (2 times)
- 13 & 14 February: World Series #9 in (Germany) Altenberg
  - Women's Monobob winner: (United States) Kaillie Humphries
- 20 February: World Series #10 in (Germany) Königssee
  - Women's Monobob winners: (Switzerland) Martina Fontanive / (Switzerland) Melanie Hasler

== Bowling ==
- 24 January – 21 February: 27th PBA Players Championship in Jupiter, FL (winner: Kyle Troup)
- 28 February: 56th PBA Tournament of Champions in Jupiter, FL (winner: Francois Lavoie)
- 13 March: 61st PBA Guaranteed Rate World Championship in Tampa, FL (winner: Tom Daugherty)
- 13 March: WSOB XII PBA Roth/Holman Doubles Championship (winners: Andrew Anderson/Kris Prather)
- 6–15 November: 2021 WTBA World Tenpin Bowling Championships

== Bowls ==
- 7 – 19 September: 2021 World Bowls Championship in (Australia) Gold Coast, cancelled
- 8 – 24 January: 2021 World Indoor Bowls Championship in (England) Norfolk

== Boxing ==
- 10 – 24 April: 2021 AIBA Youth World Boxing Championships in (Poland) Kielce
- 21 – 31 May: 2021 Asian Amateur Boxing Championships in (India) New Delhi
- 26 October – 6 November: 2021 AIBA World Boxing Championships in (Serbia) Belgrade
- October: 2021 AIBA Women's World Boxing Championships in TBD

=== EUBC ===
==== Elite tournaments ====
- 11 – 16 January: Women's Boxing EUBC European Nations Cup 2021 in (Serbia) Sombor (Women's Elite Only)

- Women's Light Fly winner: (Kazakhstan) Arailym Marat
- Women's Fly winner: (Serbia) Nina Radovanovic
- Women's Bantam winner: (Kazakhstan) Dina Zholaman
- Women's Light Welter winner: (Russia) Natalia Sychugova
- Women's Welter winner: (Turkey) Busenaz Sürmeneli
- Women's Light Heavy winner: (Serbia) Milena Matović
- Women's Heavy winner: (Kazakhstan) Lazzat Kungeibayeva

- 7 – 13 February: 65th Bocskai István Memorial International Boxing Tournament in (Hungary) Debrecen

- Women's

- Women's Fly winner: (Turkey) Buse Naz Çakıroğlu
- Women's Feather winner: (Italy) Irma Testa
- Women's Light winner: (Finland) Mira Potkonen
- Women's Light Middle winner: (Turkey) Busenaz Sürmeneli
- Women's Middle winner: (Netherlands) Nouchka Fontijn

- Men's

- Men's Fly winner: (Spain) Gabriel Escobar
- Men's Light winner: (Hungary) Richárd Kovács
- Men's Middle winner: (England) Lewis Richardson
- Men's Heavy winner: (Spain) Emmanuel Reyes Pla
- Men's Bantam winner: (France) Samuel Kistohurry
- Men's Welter winner: (England) Lambert Harvey
- Men's Light Heavy winner: (Italy) Simone Fiori
- Men's Super Heavy winner: (England) Frazer Clarke

- 21 – 28 February: 72nd International Boxing Tournament STRANDJA 2021 in (Bulgaria) Sofia

- Women's

- Women's Fly winner: (Bulgaria) Stoyka Krasteva
- Women's Light winner: (Bulgaria) Stanimira Petrova
- Women's Welter winner: (Kazakhstan) Valentina Khalzova
- Women's Light Welter winner: (Brazil) Beatriz Ferreira
- Women's Middle winner: (United States) Naomi Graham

- Men's

- Men's Fly winner: (Bulgaria) Daniel Asenov
- Men's Light winner: (Russia) Ilya Popov
- Men's Middle winner: (Ukraine) Oleksandr Khyzhniak
- Men's Heavy winner: (Bulgaria) Radoslav Pantaleev
- Men's Feather winner: (Bulgaria) Havier Ibanes
- Men's Welter winner: (Uzbekistan) Bobo-Usmon Baturov
- Men's Light Heavy winner: (Uzbekistan) Dilshodbek Ruzmetov
- Men's Super Heavy winner: (Uzbekistan) Bakhodir Jalolov

- 1 – 7 March: International Boxing Tournament "Boxam" in (Spain) Castellón de la Plana

Women

- Women's Light Flyweight winner: (Italy) Roberta Bonatti
- Women's Featherweight winner: (Italy) Irma Testa
- Women's Welterweight winner: (Italy) Angela Carini
- Women's Heavyweight winner: (Italy) Flavia Severin
- Women's Flyweight winner: (Russia) Svetlana Soluianova
- Women's Lightweight winner: (United States) Rashida Ellis
- Women's Middleweight winner: (United States) Naomi Graham

- Men's

- Men's Flyweight winner: (Kazakhstan) Makhmud Sabyrkhan
- Men's Light Welterweight winner: (India) Manish Kaushik
- Men's Middleweight winner: (Spain) Miguel Cuadrado
- Men's Heavyweight winner: (Spain) Emmanuel Reyes
- Men's Featherweight winner: (Puerto Rico) Jean Rivera
- Men's Welterweight winner: (Spain) Youba Sissokho
- Men's Light Heavyweight winner: (Italy) Simone Fiori
- Men's Super Heavyweight winner: (Spain) Ayoub Ghadfa Drissi

- 10 – 14 March: Cologne Boxing World Cup in (Germany) Köln

Women

- Women's Featherweight winner: (Brazil) Jucielen Romeu
- Women's Welterweight winner: (Germany) Leonie Müller
- Women's Flyweight winner: (Germany) Maxi Klötzer
- Women's Lightweight winner: (Brazil) Beatriz Ferreira
- Women's Middleweight winner: (Netherlands) Nouchka Fontijn

- Men's

- Men's 52 kg winner: (France) Billal Bennama
- Men's 57 kg winner: (France) Samuel Kistohurry
- Men's 63 kg winner: (Brazil) Wanderson Oliveira
- Men's 91 kg winner: (Kazakhstan) Aibek Oralbay
- Men's 69 kg winner: (Germany) Magomed Schachidov
- Men's 75 kg winner: (Germany) Kevin Schumann
- Men's 81 kg winner: (Brazil) Keno Machado
- Men's +91 kg winner: (Kazakhstan) Kamshybek Kunkabayev

- 15 – 21 March: International Elite Men & Women Istanbul Bosphorus Boxing Tournament in (Turkey) Istanbul

Women

- Women's Flyweight winner: (Turkey) Buse Naz Çakıroğlu
- Women's Battam winner: (Russia) Daria Abramovai
- Women's Welterweight winner: (Russia) Darima Sandakova
- Women's Lightweight winner: (Algeria) Imane Khelif
- Women's Middleweight winner: (Russia) Elena Gapeshina

- Men's

- Men's Flyweight winner: (Kyrgyzstan) Azat Usamaliev
- Men's Light Welterweight winner: (Turkey) Hakan Dogan
- Men's Middleweight winner: (Argentina) Francisco Daniel Verón
- Men's Heavyweight winner: (Kazakhstan) Abzal Kuttybekov
- Men's Battam winner: (Argentina) Nirco Cuello
- Men's Welterweight winner: (Kazakhstan) Darkhan Dusebay
- Men's Light Heavyweight winner: (Turkey) Bayram Malkan
- Men's Super Heavyweight winner: (Turkey) Berat Acar

- 1 – 7 April: International boxing tournament (group A) dedicated to the memory of the honored coach of Ukraine Nikolai Manger in Kherson
- 18 – 26 April: International Boxing Tournament "St. Petersburg Governor's Cup" in (Russia) Saint Petersburg
- 22 – 28 April: 58th Belgrade Winner in (Serbia) Belgrade
- 3 – 5 May: Open regional Boxing Tournament devoted to Victory Day in (Belarus) Gomel

== Canadian football ==
- 12 December – 108th Grey Cup: Winnipeg Blue Bombers defeat the Hamilton Tiger-Cats, 33–25 (in overtime).

== Canoeing ==
- 12 – 14 March: 2021 Oceania Canoe Slalom Championships in (New Zealand) Auckland
  - K1 winners: (New Zealand) Callum Gilbert (m) / (New Zealand) Luuka Jones (f)
  - C1 winners: (New Zealand) Finn Anderson (m) / (New Zealand) Luuka Jones (f)
- 6 – 9 May: 2021 European Canoe Slalom Championships in (Italy) Ivrea
  - K1 winners: (Czech Republic) Vít Přindiš (m) / (Austria) Corinna Kuhnle (f)
  - C1 winners: (France) Denis Gargaud Chanut (m) / (Spain) Miren Lazkano (f)
  - Extreme winners: (Czech Republic) Vít Přindiš (m) / (Czech Republic) Kateřina Minařík Kudějová (f)
- 11 June – 12 September: 2021 Canoe Slalom World Cup
  - K1 winners: (Czech Republic) Vít Přindiš (m) / (Australia) Jessica Fox (f)
  - C1 winners: (France) Denis Gargaud Chanut (m) / (Czech Republic) Tereza Fišerová (f)
  - Extreme winners: (Czech Republic) Vít Přindiš (m) / (Germany) Caroline Trompeter (f)
- 6 – 11 July: 2021 World Junior and U23 Canoe Slalom Championships in (Slovenia) Ljubljana
  - K1 winners: (Czech Republic) Jakub Krejčí (m U23) / (France) Titouan Castryck (m jr) / (France) Coline Charel (f U23) / (France) Evy Leibfarth (f jr)
  - C1 winners: (France) Nicolas Gestin (m U23) / (Italy) Martino Barzon (m jr) / (United Kingdom) Bethan Forrow (f U23) / (Czech Republic) Klára Kneblová (f jr)
  - Extreme winners: (Switzerland) Dimitri Marx (m U23) / (United States) Kaelin Friedenson (m jr) / (United Kingdom) Nikita Setchell (f U23) / (Switzerland) Jessica Duc (f jr)
- 3 – 6 September: 2021 ICF World Junior and U23 Canoe Sprint Championships in (Portugal) Montemor-o-Velho
- 16 – 19 September: 2021 ICF Canoe Sprint World Championships in (Denmark) Copenhagen
- 22 – 26 September: 2021 ICF Canoe Slalom World Championships in (Slovakia) Bratislava
  - K1 winners: (France) Boris Neveu (m) / (Germany) Ricarda Funk (f)
  - C1 winners: (Czech Republic) Václav Chaloupka (m) / (Germany) Elena Apel (f)
  - Extreme winners: (United Kingdom) Joe Clarke (m) / (Australia) Jessica Fox (f)
- 22 – 26 September: 2021 Wildwater Canoeing World Championships in (Slovakia) Bratislava
- 30 September – 3 October: 2021 ICF Canoe Marathon World Championships in (Romania) Pitesti
- Cancelled: 2021 ICF Canoe Polo World Championships in (Italy) Rome

== Cheerleading ==
- TBD: 2021 The Cheerleading Worlds

== Chess ==
- 19 – 27 April: Candidates Tournament 2020–2021 (2nd half) in (Russia) Yekaterinburg
- 24 November – 12 December: World Chess Championship 2021 in (United Arab Emirates) Dubai
  - (Norway) Magnus Carlsen defeated Ian Nepomniachtchi, 7½–3½.
- 25 – 31 December: World Blitz and Rapid Chess Championships 2021 in (Poland) Warsaw

== Cricket ==
- 2019–2021 ICC World Test Championship Final in England
- 2021 ICC Men's T20 World Cup in United Arab Emirates and Oman

== Cross-country skiing ==
- 8 – 14 February: 2021 Nordic Junior World Ski Championships in (Finland) Vuokatti
  - Junior Sprint Classic winners: (Finland) Niilo Moilainen (m) / (Poland) Monika Skinder (f)
  - U23 Sprint Classic winners: (Russia) Alexander Terentev (m) / (Germany) Lisa Lohmann (f)
  - Men's Junior 10 km Freestyle winner: (Norway) Martin Kirkeberg Mørk
  - Women's Junior 5 km Freestyle winner: (Russia) Veronika Stepanova
  - Men's U23 15 km Freestyle winner: (France) Hugo Lapalus
  - Women's U23 10 km Freestyle winner: (Poland) Izabela Marcisz
  - Men's Junior 30 km Mass Start Classic winner: (Russia) Alexander Ivshin
  - Women's Junior 15 km Mass Start Classic winner: (Norway) Margrethe Bergane
  - Mixed U23 4x5 km Relay winners: Norway
  - Men's Junior 4x5 km Relay winners: Norway
  - Women's Junior 4x3.3 km Relay winners: Sweden
- 24 February – 7 March: FIS Nordic World Ski Championships 2021 in (Germany) Oberstdorf
  - Sprint classical winners: (Norway) Johannes Høsflot Klæbo (m) / (Sweden) Jonna Sundling (f)
  - Men's 30 km skiathlon winner: (RSF flag) Alexander Bolshunov
  - Women's 15 km skiathlon winner: (Norway) Therese Johaug
  - Team sprint freestyle winners: Norway (Erik Valnes & Johannes Høsflot Klæbo) (m) / Sweden (Maja Dahlqvist & Jonna Sundling) (f)
  - Men's 15 km freestyle individual winner: (Norway) Hans Christer Holund
  - Women's 10 km freestyle individual winner: (Norway) Therese Johaug
  - Men's 4 × 10 km relay winners: Norway (Paal Golberg, Emil Iversen, Hans Christer Holund, Johannes Høsflot Klæbo)
  - Women's 4 × 5 km relay winners: Norway (Tiril Udnes Weng, Heidi Weng, Therese Johaug, Helene Marie Fossesholm)
  - Men's 50 km classical mass start winner: (Norway) Emil Iversen
  - Women's 30 km classical mass start winner: (Norway) Therese Johaug

=== 2021 Tour de Ski ===
- 1 – 3 January: TdS #1 in (Switzerland) Val Müstair
  - Sprint Freestyle winners: (Italy) Federico Pellegrino (m) / (Sweden) Linn Svahn (f)
  - Men's 15 km Classic Mass Start winner: (Russia) Alexander Bolshunov
  - Women's 10 km Classic Mass Start winner: (Sweden) Linn Svahn
  - Men's 15 km Freestyle Pursuit winner: (Russia) Alexander Bolshunov
  - Women's 10 km Freestyle Pursuit winner: (United States) Jessie Diggins
- 5 & 6 January: TdS #2 in (Italy) Toblach
  - Men's 15 km Freestyle winner: (Russia) Alexander Bolshunov
  - Women's 10 km Freestyle winner: (United States) Jessie Diggins
  - Men's 15 km Classic Pursuit winner: (Russia) Alexander Bolshunov
  - Women's 10 km Classic Pursuit winner: (Russia) Yuliya Stupak
- 8 – 10 January: TdS #3 in (Italy) Val di Fiemme
  - Men's 15 km Classic Mass Start winner: (Russia) Alexander Bolshunov
  - Women's 10 km Classic Mass Start winner: (Russia) Natalya Nepryayeva
  - Sprint Classic winners: (Sweden) Oskar Svensson (m) / (Sweden) Linn Svahn
  - Men's 10 km Classic Mass Start Climb winner: (Russia) Denis Spitsov
  - Women's 10 km Classic Mass Start Climb winner: (Sweden) Ebba Andersson
- Overall winners: (Russia) Alexander Bolshunov (m) / (United States) Jessie Diggins (f)

=== 2020–21 FIS Cross-Country World Cup ===
- 27–29 November 2020: WC #1 in (Finland) Ruka
  - Sprint Classic winners: (Norway) Erik Valnes (m) / (Sweden) Linn Svahn (f)
  - Men's 15 km Classic winner: (Norway) Johannes Høsflot Klæbo
  - Women's 10 km Classic winner: (Norway) Therese Johaug
  - Men's 15 km Freestyle Pursuit winner: (Norway) Hans Christer Holund
  - Women's 10 km Freestyle Pursuit winner: (Norway) Therese Johaug
- 12 & 13 December 2020: WC #2 in (Switzerland) Davos
  - Sprint Freestyle winners: (Italy) Federico Pellegrino (m) / (United States) Rosie Brennan (f)
  - Men's 15 km Freestyle winner: (Russia) Alexander Bolshunov
  - Women's 10 km Freestyle winner: (United States) Rosie Brennan
- 19 & 20 December 2020: WC #3 in (Germany) Dresden
  - Sprint Freestyle winners: (Italy) Federico Pellegrino (m) / (Switzerland) Nadine Fähndrich (f)
  - Team Sprint Freestyle winners: Russia I (Alexander Bolshunov, Gleb Retivykh) (m) / Switzerland I (Laurien van der Graaff, Nadine Fähndrich)
- 23 & 24 January: WC #7 in (Finland) Lahti
  - Men's 30 km Skiathlon winner: (Norway) Emil Iversen
  - Women's 15 km Skiathlon winner: (Norway) Therese Johaug
  - Men's 4 × 7.5 km Relay C/F winners: Norway (Pål Golberg, Emil Iversen, Sjur Røthe, Simen Hegstad Krüger)
  - Women's 4 × 5 km Relay C/F winners: Norway (Tiril Udnes Weng, Therese Johaug, Helene Marie Fossesholm, Heidi Weng)
- 29 – 31 January: WC #8 in (Sweden) Falun
  - Men's 15 km Freestyle winner: (Russia) Alexander Bolshunov
  - Women's 10 km Freestyle winner: (United States) Jessie Diggins
  - Men's 15 km Classic Mass Start winner: (Russia) Alexander Bolshunov
  - Women's 10 km Classic Mass Start winner: (Sweden) Linn Svahn
  - Sprint Classic winners: (Norway) Johannes Høsflot Klæbo (m) / (Sweden) Linn Svahn
- 6 & 7 February: WC #9 in (Sweden) Ulricehamn
  - Sprint Freestyle winners: (Sweden) Oskar Svensson (m) / (Sweden) Maja Dahlqvist (f)
  - Team Sprint Freestyle winners: Italy I (Francesco de Fabiani, Federico Pellegrino) (m) / Slovenia (Eva Urevc, Anamarija Lampič)
- 13 & 14 March: WC #10 in (Switzerland) Engadin (final)
  - Men's 15 km C Mass Start winner: (Russia) Alexander Bolshunov
  - Women's 10 km C Mass Start winner: (Russia) Yuliya Stupak
  - Men's 50 km F Pursuit winner: (Norway) Simen Hegstad Krüger
  - Women's 30 km F Pursuit: (Norway) Heidi Weng

=== 2020–21 FIS Cross-Country Continental Cup ===
==== 2020–21 OPA Alpen Cross Country Cup ====
- 5 & 6 December 2020: OPA #1 in (Switzerland) Ulrichen
  - Men's 1.5 Sprint Freestyle winner: (Russia) Artem Maltsev
  - Women's 1.3 Sprint Freestyle winner: (Switzerland) Nadine Fähndrich
  - Men's 15 km Freestyle winner: (Russia) Artem Maltsev
  - Women's 10 km Freestyle winner: (Italy) Francesca Franchi
- 18 – 20 December 2020: OPA #2 in (Italy) Formazza
  - Men's 15 km Classic winner: (Spain) Imanol Rojo
  - Women's 10 km Classic winner: (Italy) Anna Comarella
  - Men's 20 km Freestyle Must Start winner: (France) Adrien Backscheider
  - Women's 15 km Freestyle Must Start winner: (Italy) Ilaria Debertolis
- 6 & 7 March: OPA #3 in (France) Prémanon
  - Men's 15 km Freestyle winner: (France) Gérard Agnellet
  - Women's 10 km Freestyle winner: (France) Coralie Bentz
  - Men's 15 km Classic Pursuit winner: (Switzerland) Cedric Steiner
  - Women's 10 km Classic Pursuit winner: (France) Coralie Bentz
- 12 – 14 March: OPA #4 in (Slovenia) Pokljuka
  - Sprint Freestyle winners: (France) Lucas Chanavat (m) / (Germany) Coletta Rydzek (f)
  - Men's 15 km Classic winner: (Germany) Andreas Katz
  - Women's 10 km Classic winner: (Germany) Katherine Sauerbrey
  - Men's 15 km Freestyle Pursuit winner: (Germany) Friedrich Moch
  - Women's 10 km Freestyle Pursuit winner: (Germany) Lisa Lohmann

==== 2021 FIS Cross Country Balkan Cup ====
- 16 & 17 January: BC #1 in (Croatia) Ravna Gora
  - Men's 15 km Classic winner: (Romania) Paul Constantin Pepene
  - Women's 5 km Classic winner: (Croatia) Vedrana Malec
  - 1.5 Sprint Freestyle winners: (Romania) Raul Mihai Popa (m) / (Croatia) Nika Jagečić (f)
- 30 & 31 January: BC #2 in (Serbia) Zlatibor
  - Men's 10 km Classic winner: (Romania) Paul Constantin Pepene
  - Women's 5 km Classic winner: (Russia) Varvara Prokhorova
- 3 & 4 February: BC #3 in (North Macedonia) Mavrovo
  - Men's 10 km Freestyle winners: (Croatia) Krešimir Crnković (2 times)
  - Women's 5 km Freestyle winners: (Croatia) Vedrana Malec (2 times)
- 6 & 7 February: BC #4 in (Greece) 3–5 Pigadia
  - Event cancelled.
- 19 & 20 February: BC #5 in (Bosnia and Herzegovina) Dvorista/Pale
  - Men's 10 km Freestyle winners: (Croatia) Krešimir Crnković (2 times)
  - Women's 5 km Freestyle winners: (Croatia) Anika Kožica (No. 1) / (Croatia) Tena Hadžić (No. 2)
- 13 & 14 March: BC #6 in (Romania) Fundata
  - Men's 10 km Classic winner: (Romania) Paul Constantin Pepene
  - Women's 5 km Classic winner: (Romania) Tímea Lőrincz
  - Men's 10 km Freestyle winner: (Romania) Paul Constantin Pepene
  - Women's 5 km Freestyle winner (Romania) Tímea Lőrincz
- 18 – 20 March: BC #7 in (Turkey) Bolu-Gerede (final)
  - Men's 10 km C winner: (Romania) Paul Constantin Pepene
  - Women's 5 km Classic winner: (Estonia) Kaidy Kaasiku
  - Men's 10 km F Freestyle winner: (Romania) Paul Constantin Pepene
  - Women's 5 km Freestyle winner (Estonia) Kaidy Kaasiku
  - Men's Sprint F winner: (Romania) Paul Constantin Pepene
  - Women's 5 km C winner: (Estonia) Kaidy Kaasiku

==== 2020–21 East European Cup ====
- 29 November – 2 December 2020: EEC #1 in (Russia) Vershina Tea
  - Men's 1.7 Sprint Freestyle winner: (Russia) Denis Filimonov
  - Women's 1.5 Sprint Freestyle winner: (Russia) Marina Chernousova
  - Men's 15 km Classic winner: (Russia) Ivan Kirillov
  - Women's 10 km Classic winner: (Russia) Liliya Vasilyeva
  - Men's 1.7 Sprint Classic winner: (Russia) Andrey Kuznetsov
  - Women's 1.5 Sprint Classic winner: (Russia) Anastasiya Faleeva
  - Men's 15 km Freestyle winner: (Russia) Artem Nikolaev
  - Women's 10 km Freestyle winner: (Russia) Liliya Vasilyeva
- 23 – 27 December 2020: EEC #2 in (Russia) Krasnogorsk
  - 1.4 km Freestyle winners: (Russia) Denis Filimonov (m) / (Belarus) Anastasia Kirillova (f)
  - 1.4 Sprint Classic winners: (Russia) Sergey Ardashev (m) / (Russia) Olga Tsareva (f)
  - Men's 15 km Freestyle winner: (Russia) Dmitriy Bagrashov
  - Women's 10 km Freestyle winner: (Russia) Ekaterina Smirnova
  - Men's 15 km Classic winner: (Russia) Ilia Poroshkin
  - Women's 10 km Classic winner: (Russia) Nataliya Mekryukova
- 4 – 7 January: EEC #3 in (Belarus) Minsk/Raubichi
  - 1.5 km Sprint Classic winners: (Russia) Anton Timashov (m) / (Belarus) Anastasia Kirillova (f)
  - Men's 10.0 km Classic winner: (Russia) Andrey Larkov
  - Women's 5.0 km Classic winner: (Belarus) Anastasia Kirillova
  - Men's 10.0 km Freestyle winner: (Russia) Anton Timashov
  - Women's 5.0 km Freestyle winner: (Russia) Liliya Vasilyeva
- 22 January: EEC #4 in (Russia) Krasnogorsk
  - 1.4 km Freestyle winners: (Russia) Andrey Krasnov (m) / (Belarus) Anastasia Kirillova (f)
- 5 – 7 February: EEC #5 in (Russia) Krasnogorsk
  - Men's 15 km Classic winner: (Russia) Andrey Larkov
  - Women's 10 km Classic winner: (Russia) Lidia Durkina
  - 1.5 Sprint Freestyle winners: (Russia) Andrey Krasnov (m) / (Russia) Elizaveta Shalaboda (f)
- 11 – 13 February: EEC #6 in (Kazakhstan) Almaty
  - Men's 1.6 km Sprint Classic winner: (Russia) Andrey Krasnov
  - Women's 1.1 km Sprint Classic winner: (Russia) Lilia Vasilieva
  - Men's 15 km Classic winner: (Russia) Artem Nikolaev
  - Women's 10 km Classic winner: (Russia) Lilia Vasilieva
  - Men's 20 km Freestyle Mass Start winner: (Russia) Ivan Kirillov
  - Women's 15 km Freestyle Mass Start winner: (Russia) Lilia Vasilieva
- 27 February – 3 March: EEC #7 in (Russia) Syktyvkar (final)
  - Men's 15 km Classic winner: (Russia) Ilya Poroshkin
  - Women's 10 km Classic winner: (Russia) Alija Iksanova
  - 1.39 km Sprint Freestyle winners: (Russia) Fyodor Nazarov (m) / (Russia) Anna Grukhvina (f)
  - Skiathlon winners: (Russia) Anton Timashov (m) / (Russia) Ekaterina Smirnova (f)

==== 2021 FIS Cross Country Far East Cup ====
- 19 & 20 December 2020: FEC #1 in (South Korea) Alpencia
  - Event cancelled.
- 25 – 27 December 2020: FEC #2 in (Japan) Otoineppu
  - Event cancelled.
- 6 January: FEC #3 in (Japan) Sapporo
  - Event cancelled.
- 3 & 4 February: FEC #4 in (South Korea) Alpencia
  - Men's 10 km Classic winner: (South Korea) Lee Jin-bok
  - Women's 5 km Classic winner: (South Korea) Lee Chae-won
  - Men's 10 km Freestyle winner: (South Korea) Kim Eun-ho
  - Women's 5 km Freestyle winner: (South Korea) Lee Chae-won
- 12 & 13 February: FEC #5 in (Japan) Hakusan Shiramine Onsen (final)
  - Men's 15 km Classic winner: (Japan) Takatsugu Uda
  - Women's 10 km Classic winner: (Japan) Rin Sobue

==== 2020–21 FIS Cross Country Slavic Cup ====
- 19 & 20 December 2020: SC #1 in (Poland) Zakopane #1
  - Men's 10 km Classic winner: (Romania) Paul Constantin Pepene
  - Women's 5 km Classic winner: (Latvia) Patrīcija Eiduka
  - Men's 15 km Freestyle winner: (Czech Republic) Petr Knop
  - Women's 10 km Freestyle winner: (Latvia) Patrīcija Eiduka
- 29 & 30 December 2020: SC #2 in (Slovakia) Štrbské Pleso #1
  - Event cancelled.
- 20 & 21 February: SC #3 in (Slovakia) Štrbské Pleso #2
  - Event cancelled.
- 20 & 21 March: SC #4 in (Poland) Zakopane #2
  - 1.2 Sprint Classic winners: (Czech Republic) Tomáš Kalivoda (m) / (Slovakia) Alena Procházková (f)
  - Men's 30 km Freestyle Must Start winner: (Czech Republic) Petr Knop
  - Women's 15 km Freestyle Must Start winner: (Slovakia) Alena Procházková
- 27 March: SC #5 in (Slovakia) Kremnica (final)
  - Event cancelled.

==== 2021 FIS Cross Country North American Cup ====
- 7 – 10 January: NAC #1 at the (Canada) Whistler Olympic Park (final)
  - Event cancelled.

== Cue sports ==
- 7 – 11 December: 2021 UMB World Three-cushion Championship in (Egypt) Sharm el-Sheikh
  - (Netherlands) Dick Jaspers defeated (Turkey) Murat Naci Çoklu, 50–47.

== Curling ==
- 2 – 11 April 2021: 2021 World Men's Curling Championship in Calgary, Canada
  - Sweden defeated Scotland, 10–5, to win Sweden's third consecutive and tenth overall World Men's Curling Championship title.
    - Switzerland took third place.
- 30 April – 9 May 2021: 2021 World Women's Curling Championship in Calgary, Canada
- 17 – 23 May 2021: 2021 World Mixed Doubles Curling Championship in Aberdeen, Scotland

== Cycling – BMX ==
- TBD: 2021 UCI BMX World Championships in Arnhem, Netherlands

== Cycling – Cross ==
Continental and World Championships

- 7 & 8 November 2020: 2020 UEC Cyclo-cross European Championships in (Netherlands) 's-Hertogenbosch
  - Elite winners: (Belgium) Eli Iserbyt (m) / (Netherlands) Ceylin del Carmen Alvarado (f)
  - U23 winners: (Netherlands) Ryan Kamp (m) / (Netherlands) Puck Pieterse (f)
- 30 & 31 January: 2021 UCI Cyclo-cross World Championships in (Belgium) Ostend
  - Elite winners: (Netherlands) Mathieu van der Poel (m) / (Netherlands) Lucinda Brand (f)
  - U23 winners: (Netherlands) Pim Ronhaar (m) / (Netherlands) Fem van Empel (f)

=== 2020–21 UCI Cyclo-cross World Cup ===
- 29 November 2020: WC #1 in (Czech Republic) Tábor
  - Elite winners: (Belgium) Michael Vanthourenhout (m) / (Netherlands) Lucinda Brand (f)
  - U23 winner: (United Kingdom) Thomas Mein
  - Juniors winners: (Czech Republic) Matěj Stránský (b) / (United Kingdom) Zoe Backstedt (f)
- 20 December 2020: WC #2 in (Belgium) Namur
  - Elite winners: (Netherlands) Mathieu van der Poel (m) / (Netherlands) Lucinda Brand (f)
- 27 December 2020: WC #3 in (Belgium) Dendermonde
  - Elite winners: (Belgium) Wout van Aert (m) / (Netherlands) Lucinda Brand (f)
- 3 January: WC #4 in (Netherlands) Hulst
  - Elite winners: (Netherlands) Mathieu van der Poel (m) / (Netherlands) Denise Betsema
- 24 January: WC #5 in (Belgium) Overijse (final)
  - Elite winners: (Belgium) Wout van Aert (m) / (Netherlands) Ceylin del Carmen Alvarado (f)

=== 2020–21 Cyclo-cross Superprestige ===
- 11 October 2020: Superprestige #1 in (Netherlands) Gieten
  - Elite winners: (Belgium) Toon Aerts (m) / (Netherlands) Ceylin del Carmen Alvarado (f)
- 24 October 2020: Superprestige #2 in (Belgium) Oostkamp
  - Elite winners: (Belgium) Eli Iserbyt (m) / (Netherlands) Ceylin del Carmen Alvarado (f)
  - Juniors winner: (Belgium) Jente Michels
- 11 November 2020: Superprestige #3 in (Belgium) Niel
  - Elite winners: (Belgium) Laurens Sweeck (m) / (Netherlands) Lucinda Brand (f)
- 22 November 2020: Superprestige #4 in (Belgium) Merksplas
  - Elite winners: (Belgium) Michael Vanthourenhout (m) / (Netherlands) Lucinda Brand (f)
- 6 December 2020: Superprestige #5 in (Belgium) Boom
  - Elite winners: (Belgium) Eli Iserbyt (m) / (Netherlands) Lucinda Brand (f)
- 13 December 2020: Superprestige #6 in (Belgium) Gavere
  - Elite winners: (United Kingdom) Tom Pidcock (m) / (Netherlands) Lucinda Brand (f)
- 26 December 2020: Superprestige #7 in (Belgium) Heusden-Zolder
  - Elite winners: (Netherlands) Mathieu van der Poel (m) / (Netherlands) Lucinda Brand (f)
- 6 February: Superprestige #8 in (Belgium) Middelkerke (final)
  - Winners: (Belgium) Laurens Sweeck (m) / (Netherlands) Denise Betsema (f)

=== EKZ CrossTour 2020-2021 ===
- 13 September 2020: EKZ CrossTour #1 in (Switzerland) Baden
  - Elite winners: (Switzerland) Lars Forster (m) / (Germany) Elisabeth Brandau (f)
  - Juniors winner: (Belgium) Aaron Dockx
- 18 October 2020: EKZ CrossTour #2 in (Switzerland) Bern
  - Elite winners: (Belgium) Michael Vanthourenhout (m) / (Netherlands) Denise Betsema (f)
  - Juniors winner: (Switzerland) Nils Aebersold
- 2 January: EKZ CrossTour #3 in (Switzerland) Hittnau (final)
  - Elite winners: (Switzerland) Kevin Kuhn (m) / (Luxembourg) Christine Majerus (f)
  - Juniors winner: (Switzerland) Finn Treudler

=== Ethias Cross 2020-2021 ===
- 26 September 2020: Ethias Cross #1 in (Belgium) Lokeren
  - Elite winners: (Belgium) Eli Iserbyt (m) / (Netherlands) Aniek van Alphen (f)
- 3 October 2020: Ethias Cross #2 in (Belgium) Kruibeke
  - Elite winners: (Belgium) Toon Aerts (m) / (Netherlands) Lucinda Brand (f)
- 17 October 2020: Ethias Cross #3 in (Belgium) Beringen
  - Elite winners: (Belgium) Toon Aerts (m) / (Netherlands) Denise Betsema (f)
  - Juniors winner: (Italy) Lorenzo Masciarelli
- 14 November 2020: Ethias Cross #4 in (Belgium) Leuven
  - Elite winners: (Belgium) Laurens Sweeck (m) / (Netherlands) Ceylin del Carmen Alvarado (f)
- 22 December 2020: Ethias Cross #5 in (Belgium) Essen
  - Elite winners: (Netherlands) Mathieu van der Poel (m) / (Netherlands) Marianne Vos (f)
- 30 December 2020: Ethias Cross #6 in (Belgium) Bredene
  - Elite winners: (Netherlands) Mathieu van der Poel (m) / (Hungary) Kata Blanka Vas (f)
- 13 February: Ethias Cross #7 in (Belgium) Eeklo
  - Elite winners: (Belgium) Quinten Hermans (m) / (Netherlands) Denise Betsema (f)
- 20 February: Ethias Cross #8 in (Belgium) Sint-Niklaas (final)
  - Elite winners: (Belgium) Eli Iserbyt (m) / (Netherlands) Denise Betsema (f)

=== Toi Toi Cup 2020-2021 ===
- 26 September 2020: Toi Toi Cup #1 in (Czech Republic) Mladá Boleslav
  - Elite winners: (Czech Republic) Michael Boroš (m) / (Italy) Sara Casasola (f)
  - Juniors winners: (Czech Republic) Matěj Stránský (b) / (Czech Republic) Julia Kopecky (g)
- 27 September 2020: Toi Toi Cup #2 in (Czech Republic) Holé Vrchy
  - Elite winners: (Belgium) Lander Loockx (m) / (Italy) Sara Casasola (f)
  - Juniors winners: (Czech Republic) Matěj Stránský (b) / (Czech Republic) Julia Kopecky (g)
- 15 November 2020: Toi Toi Cup #3 in (Czech Republic) Hlinsko
  - Cancelled.
- 17 November 2020: Toi Toi Cup #4 in (Czech Republic) Rýmařov
  - Elite winners: (Czech Republic) Michael Boroš (m) / (Hungary) Kata Blanka Vas (f)
  - Juniors winners: (Czech Republic) Matěj Stránský (b) / (Czech Republic) Anna Růžičková (g)
- 22 November 2020: Toi Toi Cup #5 in (Czech Republic) Jičín
  - Elite winners: (Italy) Jakob Dorigoni (m) / (Belgium) Joyce Vanderbeken (f)
  - Juniors winners: (Czech Republic) Matěj Stránský (b) / (Czech Republic) Julia Kopecky (g)
- 12 December 2020: Toi Toi Cup #6 in (Czech Republic) Kolín (final)
  - Elite winners: (Poland) Marek Konwa (m) / (Czech Republic) Pavla Havlíková (f)

=== X2O Badkamers Trofee 2020-2021 ===
- 31 October 2020: X2O Badkamers Trofee #1 in (Belgium) Oudenaarde
  - Elite winners: (Belgium) Eli Iserbyt (m) / (Netherlands) Annemarie Worst (f)
- 28 November 2020: X2O Badkamers Trofee #2 in (Belgium) Kortrijk
  - Elite winners: (Belgium) Eli Iserbyt (m) / (Netherlands) Lucinda Brand (f)
- 12 December 2020: X2O Badkamers Trofee #3 in (Belgium) Antwerp
  - Elite winners: (Netherlands) Mathieu van der Poel (m) / (Netherlands) Denise Betsema (f)
- 23 December 2020: X2O Badkamers Trofee #4 in (Belgium) Herentals
  - Elite winners: (Belgium) Wout van Aert (m) / (Netherlands) Ceylin del Carmen Alvarado (f)
- 1 January: X20 Badkamers Trofee #5 in (Belgium) Baal
  - Elite winners: (Netherlands) Mathieu van der Poel (m) / (Netherlands) Ceylin del Carmen Alvarado (f)
- 23 January: X2O Badkamers Trofee #6 in (Belgium) Hamme
  - Elite winners: (Netherlands) Mathieu van der Poel (m) / (Netherlands) Ceylin del Carmen Alvarado (f)
- 7 February: X2O Badkamers Trofee #7 in (Belgium) Lille
  - Elite winners: (Belgium) Laurens Sweeck (m) / (Netherlands) Ceylin del Carmen Alvarado (f)
- 14 February: X2O Badkamers Trofee #8 in (Belgium) Brussels (final)
  - Elite winners: (Belgium) Toon Aerts (m) / (Netherlands) Ceylin del Carmen Alvarado (f)

== Cycling – Mountain Bike ==
=== 2020 Summer Olympics ===
- 26 & 27 July: Mountain Bike ath 2020 Summer Olimpics in (Japan) Tokyo

=== International mountain biking events ===
- 24 – 28 March: American Mountain Bike Continental Championships in (Puerto Rico) Salinas (XCO/XCR/XCE)
  - Elite XCO winners: (Mexico) Gerardo Ulloa (m) / (Mexico) Daniela Campuzano (f)
  - U23 XCO winners: (Chile) Martín Vidaurre Kossman (m) / (United States) Savilia Blunk (f)
  - Junior XCO winners: (Puerto Rico) Camilo Gómez (m) / (United States) Ruth Holcomb (f)
  - Elite XCE winners: (Puerto Rico) Jacob Morales Ortega (m) / (Puerto Rico) Kiara Marrero (f)
  - Elite XCC winners: (Mexico) Gerardo Ulloa (m) / (United States) Kelsey Urban (f)
  - XCR winners: United States (Russell Finsterwald, Bradyn Lange, Ruth Holcomb, Ethan Villaneda, Madigan Munro, Savilia Blunk)
- 23 April: American Mountain Bike Continental Championships in (Chile) San Pedro de Atacama and Antofagasta (XCM)
- 2 May: 2021 UCI Mountain Bike World Championships in (Austria) Graz (XCE)
- 20 June: European Continental Championships in (Switzerland) Evolène (XCM)
- 26 June: European Continental Championships in (Spain) Val d'Aran (Ultra XCM)
- 8 – 11 July: European Continental Championships in (Serbia) Novi Sad (XCO/XCR/XCE)
- 27 July – 1 August: European Continental Championships in (Slovenia) Maribor (DHI)
- 17 – 22 August: UCI Mountain Bike Masters World Championships in (France) Pra-Loup
- 25 – 29 August: 2021 UCI Mountain Bike World Championships in (Italy) Val di Sole (XCO/XCC/XCR/DHI/E-MTB/4X)
- 25 & 26 September: UCI Mountain Bike Masters World Championships in (Italy) II Ciocco
- 2 October: UCI Mountain Bike Marathon World Championships in (Italy) Capoliveri
- 22 – 24 October: Asian Continental Championships in Myanmar (XCO/DHI/XCR/XCE)

=== 2021 UCI Mountain Bike World Cup ===
- 24 April: WC #1 in Monaco (E-MTB)
  - Winners: (France) Jérôme Gilloux (m) / (Germany) Sofia Wiedenroth (f)
- 25 April: WC #2 in Monaco (E-MTB)
  - Winners: (France) Jérôme Gilloux (m) / (Germany) Sofia Wiedenroth (f)
- 8 & 9 May: WC #2 in (Germany) Albstadt (XCC/XCO)
  - Winners: (Netherlands) Mathieu van der Poel (m) / (France) Pauline Ferrand-Prévot (f) (XCC)
- 15 & 16 May: WC #3 in (Czech Republic) Nové Město na Moravě (XCO)
- 22 & 23 May: WC #4 in (United Kingdom) Fort William (DHI)
- 12 & 13 June: WC #5 in (Austria) Leogang (XCO & DHI)
- 3 & 4 July: WC #6 in (France) Les Gets (XCO & DHI)
- 8 August: WC #7 in (Belgium) Leuven (XCE)
- 15 August: WC #8 in (Belgium) Oudenaarde (XCE)
- 4 & 5 September: WC #9 in (Switzerland) Lenzerheide (XCO & DHI)
- 12 September: WC #10 in (Germany) Winterberg (XCE)
- 17 September: WC #11 in (France) Jablines-Annet (XCE)
- 18 & 19 September: WC #12 in (United States) Snowshoe (XCO & DHI)
- 19 September: WC #13 in (Netherlands) Valkenswaard (XCE)
- 2 October: WC #14 in (Spain) Barcelona (XCE)
- 10 October: WC #15 in Gibraltar (XCE)

== Cycling – Para-cycling ==
- TBD: 2021 UCI Para-cycling Track World Championships
- TBD: 2021 UCI Para-cycling Road World Championships

== Cycling – Road ==
- 2 – 6 March: 2021 African Road Championships in (Egypt) Giza
  - Senior Road Race winners: (South Africa) Ryan Gibbons (m) / (South Africa) Carla Oberholzer (f)
  - Junior Road Race winners: (Rwanda) Etienne Tuyizere (m) / (South Africa) Chanté Olivier (f)
  - Senior ITT winners: (South Africa) Ryan Gibbons (m) / (South Africa) Carla Oberholzer (f)
  - Junior ITT winners: (South Africa) Pedri Crause (m) / (South Africa) Chanté Olivier (f)
  - Senior TTT winners: South Africa (Ryan Gibbons, Kent Main, Gustav Basson, Jason Oosthuizen) (m) / South Africa (Frances Janse van Rensburg, Carla Oberholzer, Hayley Preen, Maroesjka Matthee) (f)
  - Junior TTT winners: Algeria (Salah Eddine Ayoubi Cherki, Abdelkrim Ferkous, Mohamed Redouane Brinis, Khaled Mansouri) (m) / South Africa (Chanté Olivier, Ainsli de Beer, Amber Hindmarch, McKenzie Pedro) (f)
  - Mixed TTT winners: South Africa (Gustav Basson, Carla Oberholzer, Frances Janse van Rensburg, Hayley Preen, Ryan Gibbons, Kent Main)
- TBD: 2021 UCI Road World Championships in Bruges and Leuven, Belgium

=== 2021 UCI World Tour ===
- 21 – 27 February: (United Arab Emirates) 2021 UAE Tour Winner: (Slovenia) Tadej Pogačar (UAE Team Emirates)
- 27 February: (Belgium) 2021 Omloop Het Nieuwsblad Winner: (Italy) Davide Ballerini (Deceuninck–Quick-Step)
- 6 March: (Italy) 2021 Strade Bianche Winner: (Netherlands) Mathieu van der Poel (Alpecin–Fenix)
- 7 – 14 March: (France) 2021 Paris–Nice Winner: (Germany) Maximilian Schachmann (Bora–Hansgrohe)
- 10 – 16 March: (Italy) 2021 Tirreno–Adriatico Winner: (Slovenia) Tadej Pogačar (UAE Team Emirates)
- 20 March: (Italy) 2021 Milan–San Remo Winner: (Belgium) Jasper Stuyven (Trek–Segafredo)
- 22 – 28 March: (Spain) 2021 Volta a Catalunya Winner: (United Kingdom) Adam Yates (INEOS Grenadiers)
- 24 March: (Belgium) 2021 Classic Brugge–De Panne Winner: (Republic of Ireland) Sam Bennett (Deceuninck–Quick-Step)
- 26 March: (Belgium) 2021 E3 Saxo Bank Classic Winner: (Denmark) Kasper Asgreen (Deceuninck–Quick-Step)
- 28 March: (Belgium) 2021 Gent–Wevelgem Winner: (Belgium) Wout van Aert (Team Jumbo–Visma)
- 31 March: (Belgium) 2021 Dwars door Vlaanderen Winner: (Netherlands) Dylan van Baarle (INEOS Grenadiers)
- 4 April: (Belgium) 2021 Tour of Flanders Winner: (Denmark) Kasper Asgreen (Deceuninck–Quick-Step)
- 5 – 10 April: (Spain) 2021 Tour of the Basque Country Winner: (Slovenia) Primož Roglič (Team Jumbo–Visma)
- 18 April: (Netherlands) 2021 Amstel Gold Race Winner: (Belgium) Wout van Aert (Team Jumbo–Visma)
- 25 April: (Belgium) 2021 Liège–Bastogne–Liège Winner: (Slovenia) Tadej Pogačar (UAE Team Emirates)

=== 2021 UCI Women's World Tour ===
- 6 March: (Italy) 2021 Strade Bianche Winner: (Netherlands) Chantal van den Broek-Blaak (SD Worx)
- 21 March: (Italy) 2021 Trofeo Alfredo Binda-Comune di Cittiglio Winner: (Italy) Elisa Longo Borghini (Trek–Segafredo)
- 25 March: (Belgium) 2021 Classic Brugge–De Panne Winner: (Australia) Grace Brown (Team BikeExchange)
- 28 March: (Belgium) 2021 Gent–Wevelgem Winner: (Netherlands) Marianne Vos (Team Jumbo–Visma)
- 4 April: (Belgium) 2021 Tour of Flanders for Women Winner: (Netherlands) Annemiek van Vleuten (Movistar Team)
- 18 April: (Netherlands) 2021 Amstel Gold Race Winner: (Netherlands) Marianne Vos (Team Jumbo–Visma)
- 21 April: (Belgium) 2021 Flèche Wallonne Winner: (Netherlands) Anna van der Breggen (SD Worx)
- 25 April: (Belgium) 2021 Liège–Bastogne–Liège Winner: (Netherlands) Demi Vollering (SD Worx)

== Cycling – Track ==
- 10 – 13 March: 2021 African Track Cycling Championships in (Egypt) Cairo
  - South Africa won overall gold medals tally and overall medal tally.
- 13–17 October: 2021 UCI Track Cycling World Championships in (France) Roubaix

== Darts ==
=== Professional Darts Corporation ===
- 15 December 2020 – 3 January 2021: 2021 PDC World Darts Championship in (England) London
  - Gerwyn Price beat Gary Anderson , 7–3.
- 29 – 31 January: 2021 Masters in (England) Milton Keynes
  - Jonny Clayton beat Mervyn King , 11–8.
- 5 – 7 March: 2021 UK Open in (England) Milton Keynes
  - James Wade beat Luke Humphries , 11–5.
- 5 April – 28 May: 2021 Premier League Darts in (England) Milton Keynes
  - Jonny Clayton beat José de Sousa , 11–5.
- 17 – 25 July: 2021 World Matchplay in (England) Blackpool
  - Peter Wright beat Dimitri Van den Bergh , 18–9.
- 9 – 12 September: 2021 PDC World Cup of Darts in (Germany) Jena
  - Scotland (Peter Wright & John Henderson) beat Austria (Mensur Suljović & Rowby-John Rodriguez), 3–1.
- 17 – 18 September: 2021 Nordic Darts Masters in (Denmark) Copenhagen
  - Michael van Gerwen beat Fallon Sherrock , 11–7.
- 3 – 9 October: 2021 World Grand Prix in (England) Leicester
  - Jonny Clayton beat Gerwyn Price , 5–1.
- 14 – 17 October: 2021 European Championship in (Austria) Salzburg
  - Rob Cross beat Michael van Gerwen , 11–8.
- 29 – 31 October: 2021 World Series of Darts Finals in (Netherlands) Amsterdam
  - Jonny Clayton beat Dimitri Van den Bergh , 11–6.
- 13 – 21 November: 2021 Grand Slam of Darts in (England) Wolverhampton
  - Gerwyn Price beat Peter Wright , 16–8.
- 26 – 28 November: 2021 Players Championship Finals in (England) Minehead
  - Peter Wright beat Ryan Searle , 11–10.
- 28 November: 2021 PDC World Youth Championship in (England) Minehead
  - Ted Evetts beat Nathan Rafferty , 6–4.

== Dance sport ==
- TBD: DanceSport at the 2021 World Games

== Dodgeball ==
- TBD: 2021 World Dodgeball Championships

== Disc golf ==
PDGA Majors:

21–23 May: (California) United States Women's Disc Golf Championship: (Texas) Paige Pierce

22–26 June: (Utah) Professional Disc Golf World Championships: Men's: (Virginia) James Conrad Women's: (Minnesota) Catrina Allen

6–9 October: (South Carolina) United States Disc Golf Championship:

Disc Golf Pro Tour:

25–28 February: (Nevada) Las Vegas Challenge: Men's: (Colorado) Eagle McMahon Women's: (Texas) Paige Pierce

12–14 March: (Texas) Waco Annual Charity Open: Men's: (Missouri) Nikko Locastro Women's: (California) Kona Star Panis

16–18 April: (Arkansas) Jonesboro Open: Men's: (South Carolina) Ricky Wysocki Women's: (Minnesota) Catrina Allen

14–16 May: (California) OTB Open: Men's: (Colorado) Eagle McMahon Women's: (Texas) Paige Pierce

4–6 June: (Oregon) Portland Open: Men's: (Colorado) Eagle McMahon Women's: (Texas) Paige Pierce

9–11 July: (Iowa) Des Moines Challenge: Men's: (California) Paul McBeth Women's: (New York (state)) Missy Gannon

23–25 July: (Michigan) Discraft Great Lakes Open: Men's: (Colorado) Eagle McMahon Women's: (Estonia) Kristin Tattar

30 July – 1 August: (Minnesota) The Preserve Championship: Men's: (South Carolina) Ricky Wysocki Women's: (Estonia) Kristin Tattar

5–8 August: (Illinois) Discraft Ledgestone Insurance Open: Men's: (South Carolina) Ricky Wysocki and (Florida) Calvin Heimburg Women's: (Texas) Paige Pierce

13–15 August: (Kentucky) Idlewild Open: Men's: (Michigan) Kyle Klein Women's: (Texas) Paige Pierce

3–5 September: (Massachusetts) MVP Open at Maple Hill: Men's: (Wisconsin) Adam Hammes Women's: (Minnesota) Catrina Allen

9–12 September: (Vermont) Green Mountain Championship: Men's: (Tennessee) Chris Dickerson Women's: (Wisconsin) Hailey King

14–17 October: (North Carolina) Tour Championship:

PDGA National Tour:

26–28 March: Texas State Disc Golf Championships: Men's: (South Carolina) Ricky Wysocki Women's: (Wisconsin) Hailey King

28 April – 1 May: (Kansas) Dynamic Discs Open: Men's: (California) Paul McBeth Women's: (Wisconsin) Hailey King

28–30 May: (California) Santa Cruz Master's Cup: Men's: (Wisconsin) Adam Hammes Women's: (Texas) Paige Pierce

27–29 August: Delaware Disc Golf Challenge: Men's: (Texas) Connor O'Reilly Women's: (Minnesota) Catrina Allen

23–26 September: (Tennessee) Music City Open: Men's: Women's:

== Fencing ==
- 3 – 11 April: 2021 Junior and Cadet World Fencing Championships in (Egypt) Cairo

=== 2020-21 Fencing World Cup ===
Men
Sabre

- 11 – 14 March: WC #1 in (Hungary) Budapest
  - Individual winner: (South Korea) Oh Sang-uk
  - Teams winners: Russia

Épée

- 19 – 23 March: WC #1 in (Russia) KAZ
  - Individual winner: (Ukraine) Ihor Reizlin
  - Teams winners: Italy

Women
Sabre

- 11 – 14 March: WC #1 in (Hungary) Budapest
  - Individual winner: (Hungary) Anna Márton
  - Teams winners: Poland

Épée

- 19 – 23 March: WC #1 in (Russia) KAZ
  - Individual winner: (South Korea) Choi In-jeong
  - Teams winners: Poland

=== 2021 Grand Prix ===
Foil

- 26 – 28 March: GP #1 in (Qatar) Doha
  - Winners: (United States) Gerek Meinhardt (m) / (Russia) Inna Deriglazova (f)

== Field hockey ==
- 2021 Men's FIH Hockey Junior World Cup
- 2021 Women's FIH Hockey Junior World Cup

=== EHF ===
- 2 – 5 April: 2021 Women's EuroHockey Club Trophy in (Belgium) Boom
- 2 – 5 April: Women's EuroHockey Club Challenge I in (Czech Republic) Prague
- 2 – 5 April: EuroHockey Club Trophy I in (Austria) Vienna
- 2 – 5 April: EuroHockey Club Trophy II in (Czech Republic) Plzeň
- 3 – 5 April: 2021 Euro Hockey League (Final Four) in (Netherlands) Amsterdam
  - In the final, (Netherlands) HC Bloemendaal defeated (Spain) Club Deportiu Terrassa, 5–2, to win their 4th Euro Hockey League.
  - (Belgium) Royal Léopold Club took third place.
- 3 – 5 April: 2021 Euro Hockey League Women (Final Four) in (Netherlands) Amsterdam
- 20 – 23 May: EuroHockey Club Challenge I in (Slovenia) Lipovci

=== AfHF ===
- 15 – 18 April: 2021 Men's Indoor African Cup and 2021 Women's Indoor African Cup in (South Africa) Durban
- 27 September – 3 October: 2021 Hockey Africa Cup for Club Champions in (Malawi) Blantyre
- TBD: 2021 Junior Africa Hockey Cup in TBD place

=== PAHF ===
- 22 – 27 June: 2021 Indoor Pan American Cup in (United States) Philadelphia

== Figure skating ==
=== International figure skating events ===
==== 2020–21 ISU Figure Skating Championships ====
- 22–28 March 2021: 2021 World Figure Skating Championships in Stockholm, Sweden
  - Men's winner: (United States) Nathan Chen
  - Ladies winner: Anna Shcherbakova
  - Pairs winners: Anastasia Mishina / Aleksandr Galliamov
  - Ice dance winners: Victoria Sinitsina / Nikita Katsalapov

==== 2020–21 ISU Grand Prix of Figure Skating ====
- 23–24 October 2020: 2020 Skate America in (United States) Las Vegas
  - Men's winner: (United States) Nathan Chen
  - Ladies winner: (United States) Mariah Bell
  - Pairs winners: (United States) Alexa Knierim / Brandon Frazier
  - Ice dance winners: (United States) Madison Hubbell / Zachary Donohue
- 6–8 November 2020: 2020 Cup of China in Chongqing
  - Men winner: (China) Jin Boyang
  - Ladies winner: (China) Chen Hongyi
  - Pairs winners: (China) Peng Cheng / Jin Yang
  - Ice dance winners: (China) Wang Shiyue / Liu Xinyu
- 20–22 November 2020: 2020 Rostelecom Cup in (Russia) Moscow
  - Men winner: (Russia) Mikhail Kolyada
  - Ladies winner: (Russia) Elizaveta Tuktamysheva
  - Pairs winners: (Russia) Aleksandra Boikova / Dmitrii Kozlovskii
  - Ice dance winners: (Russia) Victoria Sinitsina / Nikita Katsalapov
- 27–29 November 2020: 2020 NHK Trophy in (Japan) Osaka
  - Men winner: (Japan) Yuma Kagiyama
  - Ladies winner: (Japan) Kaori Sakamoto
  - No pairs event held.
  - Ice dance winners: (Japan) Misato Komatsubara / Tim Koleto

==== 2020–21 ISU Challenger Series ====
- 23–26 September 2020: 2020 CS Nebelhorn Trophy in (Germany) Oberstdorf
  - Men winner: (Latvia) Deniss Vasiļjevs
  - Ladies winner: (Estonia) Eva-Lotta Kiibus
  - Pairs winners: (Italy) Rebecca Ghilardi / Filippo Ambrosini
  - Ice dance winners: (Czech Republic) Natálie Taschlerová / Filip Taschler
- 15–17 October 2020: 2020 CS Budapest Trophy in (Hungary) Budapest
  - Men winner: (Italy) Daniel Grassl
  - Ladies winner: (Belgium) Loena Hendrickx
  - No pairs event held.
  - Ice dance winners: (Ukraine) Oleksandra Nazarova / Maxim Nikitin

==== Other ====
- 15–18 April 2021: 2021 ISU World Team Trophy in Figure Skating (Japan) Osaka
  - Team winners: Russia (Mikhail Kolyada, Evgeni Semenenko, Anna Shcherbakova, Elizaveta Tuktamysheva, Anastasia Mishina / Aleksandr Galliamov, Victoria Sinitsina / Nikita Katsalapov)

== Floorball ==
=== World ===
- 25 – 29 August: 2021 Men's under-19 World Floorball Championships in Brno
  - In final, Czech Republic defeated Finland, 4–3, to win their 2nd Men's U19 World Floorball Championships. Sweden took third place and Switzerland fourth place.
- 1 – 5 September: 2020 Women's under-19 World Floorball Championships in Uppsala (postponed from 2020)
  - In final, Finland defeated Sweden, 4–3, to win their 2th Women's U19 World Floorball Championships. Czech Republic took third place and Switzerland fourth place.
- 27 November – 5 December: 2021 Women's World Floorball Championships in Uppsala
  - Champion: Sweden
- 3 – 11 December: 2020 Men's World Floorball Championships in (Finland) Helsinki (postponed from 2020)
  - Champion: Sweden
- Champions Cup – cancelled

== Freestyle skiing ==
- 9 February – 16 March: FIS Freestyle Ski and Snowboarding World Championships 2021 in (Sweden) Idre, (Slovenia) Rogla, (Kazakhstan) Almaty and (United States) Aspen
  - Ski Cross winners: (Switzerland) Alex Fiva (m) / (Sweden) Sandra Näslund (f)
  - Slopestyle winners: (Switzerland) Andri Ragettli (m) / (China) Gu Ailing (f)
  - Halfpipe winners: (New Zealand) Nico Porteous (m) / (China) Gu Ailing (f)
  - Big Air winners: (Sweden) Oliwer Magnusson (m) / (RSF flag) Anastasia Tatalina (f)
  - Aerials winners: (RSF flag) Maxim Burov (m) / (Australia) Laura Peel (f)
  - Team Aerials winners: (RSF flag) (Liubov Nikitina, Pavel Krotov, Maxim Burov)
  - Moguls winners: (Canada) Mikaël Kingsbury (m) / (France) Perrine Laffont (f)
  - Dual moguls winners: (Canada) Mikaël Kingsbury (m) / (RSF flag) Anastasia Smirnova (f)
- 15 – 28 March: 2021 FIS Freestyle Junior World Ski Championships in Krasnoyarsk
  - Aerials winners: (Russia) Artem Potapov (m) / (Russia) Anastasiia Prytkova (f)
  - Team aerials winners: Russia I (Artem Potapov, Anastasiia Prytkova, Arsenii Vagin)
  - Moguls winners: (Russia) Nikita Andreev (m) / (Japan) Anri Kawamura (f)
  - Dual moguls winners: (Japan) Shima Kawaoka (m) / (Russia) Viktoriia Lazarenko (f)
  - Ski cross winners: (Austria) Oliver Vierthaler (m) / (Russia) Darya Melchakova (f)
  - Team Ski Cross winners: Austria I (Oliver Vierthaler, Christina Födermayr)
  - Halfpipe winners: (Estonia) Henry Sildaru (m) / (Russia) Alexandra Glazkova (f)
  - Slopestyle winners: (Czech Republic) Matěj Švancer (m) / (Russia) Ksenia Orlova (f)
  - Big Air winners: (Czech Republic) Matěj Švancer (m) / (Russia) Ksenia Orlova (f)

=== 2020–21 FIS Freestyle Ski World Cup ===
Big Air

- 7 & 8 January: WC #1 in (Austria) Kreischberg (final)
  - Winners: (Norway) Birk Ruud (m) / (Switzerland) Giulia Tanno (f)

Slopestyle

- 19 – 21 November 2020: WC #1 in (Austria) Stubai
  - Winners: (Switzerland) Andri Ragettli (m) / (France) Tess Ledeux (f)
- 18 – 20 March: WC #2 in (United States) Aspen
  - Winners: (United States) Colby Stevenson (m) / (France) Tess Ledeux (f)

Ski Cross

- 14 – 16 December 2020: WC #1 in (Switzerland) Arosa
  - Winners #1: (Sweden) David Mobärg (m) / (Sweden) Alexandra Edebo (f)
  - Winners #2: (Sweden) Viktor Andersson (m) / (Switzerland) Fanny Smith (f)
- 19 – 21 December 2020: WC #2 in (France) Val Thorens
  - Winners #1: (France) Jonathan Midol (m) / (Switzerland) Fanny Smith (f)
  - Winners #2: (Canada) Reece Howden (m) / (Austria) Katrin Ofner (f)
  - Winners #3: (Canada) Reece Howden (m) / (Switzerland) Fanny Smith (f)
- 29 – 31 January: WC #3 in (Germany) Feldberg
  - Event cancelled.
- 17 – 19 February: WC #4 in (Austria) Reiteralm
  - Winners: (Austria) Johannes Rohrweck (m) / (Sweden) Sandra Näslund (f)
- 26 – 28 February: WC #4 in (Georgia (country)) Bakuriani
  - Winners: (Germany) Florian Wilmsmann (m) / (Switzerland) Fanny Smith (f)
  - Team winners: Switzerland 1
- 12 & 13 March: WC #5 in (Russia) Sunny Valley
  - Winners: (Canada) Reece Howden (m) / (Switzerland) Fanny Smith (f)
- 21 March: WC #6 in (Switzerland) Veysonnaz (final)

Moguls

- 5 December 2020: WC #1 in (Finland) Ruka
  - Winners: (Japan) Ikuma Horishima (m) / (France) Perrine Laffont (f)
- 12 December 2020: WC #2 in (Sweden) Idre Fjäll
  - Winners: (France) Benjamin Cavet (m) / (France) Perrine Laffont (f)
- 4 – 6 February: WC #3 in (United States) Deer Valley
  - Winners: (Canada) Mikaël Kingsbury (m) / (France) Perrine Laffont (f)

Dual Moguls

- 13 December 2020: WC #1 in (Sweden) Idre Fjäll
  - Winners: (Australia) Matt Graham & (Sweden) Ludvig Fjallstrom (m) / (France) Perrine Laffont (f)
- 4 – 6 February: WC #2 in (United States) Deer Valley
  - Winners: (Canada) Mikaël Kingsbury (m) / (United States) Kai Owens (f)

Aerials

- 4 December 2020: WC #1 in (Finland) Ruka
  - Winners: (Russia) Maxim Burov (m) / (Australia) Laura Peel (f)
- 16 & 17 January: WC #3 in Yaroslavl
  - Men's winners: (Russia) Maxim Burov (2 times)
  - Women's winners: (Australia) Laura Peel (No. 1) / (United States) Megan Nick (No. 2)
  - Team winners: Russia I (Anastasiia Prytkova, Maxim Burov, Pavel Krotov)
- 23 January: WC #3 in (Russia) Moscow
  - Winners: (Russia) Maxim Burov (m) / (United States) Winter Vinecki (f)
- 30 January: WC #4 in (Belarus) Minsk
  - Winners: (Russia) Maxim Burov (m) / (United States) Megan Nick (f)
- 4 – 6 February: WC #5 in (United States) Deer Valley
  - Winners: (Switzerland) Noé Roth (m) / (Australia) Danielle Scott (f)
- 13 & 14 March: WC #6 in (Kazakhstan) Almaty (final)
  - Winners: (Switzerland) Pirmin Werner (m) / (Canada) Marion Thénault (f)

Halfpipe

- 19 – 21 March: WC #1 in (United States) Aspen (final)
  - Winners: (United States) Aaron Blunck (m) / (Canada) Rachael Karker (f)

=== 2020–21 FIS Freestyle Ski Europa Cup ===
Aerials

- 11 & 12 December 2020: EC #1 in (Finland) Ruka
  - Men's winners: (Switzerland) Noé Roth (2 times)
  - Women's winners: (Canada) Marion Thénault (No. 1) / (Australia) Laura Peel (No. 2)
- 5 – 7 February: EC #2 in Minsk
  - Men's winners: (Belarus) Ihar Drabiankou (No. 1) / (Belarus) Maxim Gustik (No. 2)
  - Women's winner: (Belarus) Hanna Huskova (2 times)
  - Teams winners: Belarus II
- 12 & 13 February: EC #3 in (Ukraine) Krasiya
  - Men's winner: (Ukraine) Maksym Kuznietsov (2 times)
  - Women's winner: (Belarus) Valeryia Balmatava (2 times)
- 28 February – 3 March: EC #4 in (Switzerland) Airolo
  - Men's winner: (Switzerland) Noé Roth (2 times)
  - Women's winner: (Australia) Danielle Scott (2 times)

Ski Cross

- 9 & 10 January: EC #1 in (Austria) Reiteralm
  - Men's winners: (Germany) Tim Hronek (No. 1) / (Germany) Tobias Müller (No. 2)
  - Women's winners: (Germany) Daniela Maier (No. 1) / (Austria) Katrin Ofner (No. 2)
- 6 & 7 February: EC #2 in (Switzerland) Crans-Montana
  - Winners: (Austria) Adam Kappacher (m) / (France) Mylène Ballet Baz (f)
- 6 & 7 March: EC #3 in (Austria) Reiteralm
  - Men's winners: (Austria) Johannes Rohrweck (No. 1) / (Germany) Florian Wilmsmann (No. 2)
  - Women's winners: (Austria) Katrin Ofner (No. 1) / (Canada) Courtney Hoffos (No. 2)
- 12 & 13 March: EC #4 in (Italy) San Pellegrino Pass
  - Men's winners: (France) Romain Mari (No. 1) / (Italy) Simone Deromedis (No. 2)
  - Women's winners: (Switzerland) Saskja Lack (2 times)

Moguls

- 30 & 31 January: EC #1 in (Sweden) Åre/Duved
  - Men's winners: (France) James Crozet (No. 1) / (France) Thibaud Mouille (No. 2)
  - Women's winners: (France) Fantine Degroote (2 times)
- 5 – 9 February: EC #2 in (Finland) Taivalkoski
  - Men's winner: (Finland) Johannes Suikkari (4 times)
  - Women's winners: (France) Fantine Degroote (3 times) / (Finland) Riikka Voutilainen (No. 2)
- 13 & 14 February: EC #3 in (Finland) Jyväskylä
  - Men's winners: (Finland) Olli Penttala (No. 1) / (Finland) Jimi Salonen (No. 2)
  - Women's winners: (Russia) Ekaterina Ogneva (2 times)
- 28 February – 3 March: EC #4 in (Switzerland) Airolo
  - Men's winners: (France) Marius Bourdette (No. 1) / (Finland) Johannes Suikkari (No. 2)
  - Women's winners: (Germany) Sophie Weese (No. 1) / (Germany) Hanna Weese (No. 2)

Halfpipe

- 27 – 31 January: EC #1 in (Switzerland) Crans Montana
  - Winners: (Switzerland) Robin Briguet (m) / (Japan) Saori Suzuki (f)
- 7 March: EC #2 in (Switzerland) Leysin
  - Winners: (Estonia) Henry Sildaru (m) / (Switzerland) Michelle Rageth (f)

Slopestyle

- 9 March: EC #1 in (Switzerland) Leysin
  - Winners: (Switzerland) Valentin Morel (m) / (Italy) Elisa Maria Nakab (f)

Big Air

- 6 & 7 February: EC #1 in (France) Les Arcs
  - Winners: (France) Antoine Adelisse (m) / (France) Bérénice Dode (f)
- 20 February: EC #2 in (Switzerland) Davos
  - Winners: (France) Timothé Sivignon (m) / (Russia) Ksenia Orlova (f)
- 5 March: EC #3 in (Germany) Götschen
  - Winners: (Italy) Miro Tabanelli (m) / (Germany) Muriel Mohr (f)

=== 2020–21 FIS Freestyle Ski North American Cup ===
Aerials

- 5 – 9 January: NAC #1 at the (United States) Utah Olympic Park #1
  - Men's winners: (United States) Derek Krueger (No. 1) / (United States) Justin Schoenefeld (No. 2)
  - Women's winners: (United States) Megan Smallhouse (No. 1) / (United States) Megan Nick (No. 2)
- 13 & 14 February: NAC #2 at the (United States) Utah Olympic Park #2
  - Men's winners: (Canada) Émile Nadeau (No. 1) / (Kazakhstan) Sherzod Khashyrbayev (No. 2)
  - Women's winners: (Kazakhstan) Zhanbota Aldabergenova (No. 1) / (United States) Madison Varmette (No. 2)

== Futsal ==
- 12 September – 3 October: 2021 FIFA Futsal World Cup in Lithuania

== Gymnastics ==
- 27–29 May: 2021 Aerobic Gymnastics World Championships in (Azerbaijan) Baku
- 18–20 June: 2021 Acrobatic Gymnastics World Championships in (Switzerland) Geneva
- 18–24 October: 2021 World Artistic Gymnastics Championships in (Japan) Kitakyushu
- 27–31 October: 2021 Rhythmic Gymnastics World Championships in (Japan) Kitakyushu
- 11–14 November: 2021 Trampoline Gymnastics World Championships in (Azerbaijan) Baku
- Various dates: 2021 FIG Artistic Gymnastics World Cup series
- Various dates: 2021 FIG Rhythmic Gymnastics World Cup series

Europe

- 21–25 April: 2021 European Artistic Gymnastics Championships in (Switzerland) Basel
- 29 April-2 May: 2021 European Trampoline Championships in (Russia) Sochi
- 9–13 June: 2021 Rhythmic Gymnastics European Championships in (Bulgaria) Varna
- 24–26 September: 2021 Aerobic Gymnastics European Championships in (Italy) Pesaro
- 6–10 November: 2021 Acrobatic Gymnastics European Championships in (Italy) Pesaro

== Handball ==
World

- 14 – 31 January: 2021 World Men's Handball Championship in Egypt
- 2 – 19 December: 2021 World Women's Handball Championship in Spain
- 4 – 10 October: 2021 IHF Men's Super Globe
- TBD: 2021 IHF Women's Super Globe
- 2021 Men's Junior World Handball Championship
- 2021 IHF Men's Youth World Championship

=== EHF ===
National teams

- 7 – 17 January: 2020 European Men's Under-20 Handball Championship in (Croatia) Poreč
  - Event cancelled.

Club teams

- 16 September 2020 – 13 June: 2020–21 EHF Champions League (final in (Germany) Cologne)
- 12 September 2020 – 30 May: 2020–21 Women's EHF Champions League (final in (Hungary) Budapest)
- 20 August 2020 – TBD: 2020–21 EHF European League
- 10 October 2020 – TBD: 2020–21 Women's EHF European League
- 13 November 2020 – TBD: 2020–21 EHF European Cup
- 10 October 2020 – TBD: 2020–21 Women's EHF European Cup

Regional leagues

- 27 August 2020 – TBD: 2020–21 Mol Liga
- 10 October 2020 – TBD: 2020–21 Bene League

== Horse Racing ==
=== United States ===
US Triple Crown

- 1 May: 2021 Kentucky Derby at Churchill Downs
- 15 May: 2021 Preakness Stakes at (Maryland) Pimlico
- 5 June: 2021 Belmont Stakes at (New York (state)) Belmont Park

Breeder's Cup

- 5–6 Nov: Breeder's Cup at (California) Del Mar Racetrack

== Ice hockey ==
- 25 December 2020 – 5 January: 2021 World Junior Ice Hockey Championships in Edmonton and Red Deer
  - In the final, the United States defeated Canada 2–0 to win their fifth World Junior Ice Hockey Championships.
  - Finland took third place.
- 6–16 May: 2021 IIHF Women's World Championship in Canada
- 21 May – 6 June: 2021 IIHF World Championship in Latvia and Belarus
- 2021 World Junior Ice Hockey Championships
- 2021 IIHF World U18 Championships
- 2021 IIHF World Women's U18 Championship

=== National Hockey League ===
- 13 January – 8 May: 2020-21 NHL season
- 21 February: 2021 NHL Stadium Series
- 23–24 July: 2021 NHL entry draft

=== Hockey Europe ===
- 3 October 2020 – 21 May: 2020–21 Alps Hockey League

== Indoor Soccer ==
- TBD: 2021 WMF Women's World Cup
- WMF U23 World Cup

== Judo ==
- 11 – 13 January: 2021 Judo World Masters in (Qatar) Doha
  - France won overall gold medals tally. France, Japan and Netherlands won overall medal tally.
- 6 – 13 June: 2021 World Judo Championships in (Hungary) Budapest

=== 2021 IJF World Tour ===
- 18 – 20 February: (Israel) 2021 Judo Grand Slam Tel Aviv
  - Extra-lightweight winners: (Azerbaijan) Davud Mammadov (m) / (France) Shirine Boukli (f)
  - Half-lightweight winners: (Spain) Alberto Gaitero (m) / (United Kingdom) Chelsie Giles (f)
  - Lightweight winners: (Romania) Alexandru Raicu (m) / (Israel) Timna Nelson-Levy (f)
  - Half-middleweight winners: (Uzbekistan) Sharofiddin Boltaboev (m) / (Slovenia) Tina Trstenjak (f)
  - Middleweight winners: (Georgia (country)) Lasha Bekauri (m) / (France) Margaux Pinot (f)
  - Half-heavyweight winners: (Netherlands) Michael Korrel (m) / (Germany) Anna-Maria Wagner (f)
  - Heavyweight winners: (Georgia (country)) Gela Zaalishvili (m) / (France) Romane Dicko (f)
- 5 – 7 March: (Uzbekistan) 2021 Judo Grand Slam Tashkent
  - Men's Half-lightweight winner (Japan) Ryuju Nagayama
  - Women's Extra-lightweight winner: (Mongolia) Mönkhbatyn Urantsetseg
  - Lightweight winners: (South Korea) An Baul (m) / (Japan) Uta Abe (f)
  - Half-middleweight winners: (Mongolia) Tsend-Ochiryn Tsogtbaatar (m) / (Japan) Momo Tamaoki (f)
  - Middleweight winners: (Italy) Christian Parlati (m) / (Japan) Miku Tashiro (f)
  - Half-heavyweight winners: (Japan) Kenta Nagasawa (m) / (Japan) Chizuru Arai (f)
  - Heavyweight winners (Japan) Kokoro Kageura (m) / (Japan) Akira Sone (f)
- 26 – 28 March: (Georgia (country)) 2021 Judo Grand Slam Tbilisi
  - Extra Lightweight winners: (Georgia (country)) Temur Nozadze (m) / (Mongolia) Mönkhbatyn Urantsetseg (f)
  - Half Lightweight winners: (Uzbekistan) Sardor Nurillaev (m) / (Italy) Odette Giuffrida (f)
  - Lightweight winners: (Mongolia) Tsend-Ochiryn Tsogtbaatar (m) / (Kosovo) Nora Gjakova (f)
  - Half Middleweight winners: (Belgium) Sami Chouchi (m) / (Canada) Catherine Beauchemin-Pinard (f)
  - Middleweight winners: (Sweden) Marcus Nyman (m) / (Brazil) Maria Portela (f)
  - Half Heavyweight winners: (Canada) Shady El Nahas (m) / (Netherlands) Natascha Ausma (f)
  - Heavyweight winners: (Georgia (country)) Gela Zaalishvili (m) / (China) Shiyan Xu (f)
- 1 – 3 April: (Turkey) 2021 Judo Grand Slam Antalya
- 5 – 7 May: (Russia) 2021 Judo Grand Slam Kazan
- 24 – 26 September: (Croatia) 2021 Judo Grand Prix Zagreb
- 16 & 17 October: (France) 2021 Judo Grand Slam Paris
- 5 – 7 November: (Azerbaijan) 2021 Judo Grand Slam Baku (final)

=== 2021 European Open ===
- 27 & 28 February: European Open #1 in (Czech Republic) Prague
  - Extra-lightweight winners: (Netherlands) Emiel Jaring (m) / (Romania) Monica Ungureanu (f)
  - Half-lightweight winners: (Romania) Lucian Borş Dumitrescu (m) / (Belgium) Amber Ryheul (f)
  - Lightweight winners: (Romania) Adrian Sulca (m) / (Netherlands) Pleuni Cornelisse (f)
  - Half-middleweight winners: (Hungary) Benedek Tóth (m) / (Netherlands) Geke van den Berg (f)
  - Middleweight winners: (Hungary) Péter Sáfrány (f) / (Croatia) Lara Cvjetko (f)
  - Half-heavyweight winners: (Hungary) Zalán Ohát (m) / (Netherlands) Renée van Harselaar (f)
  - Heavyweight winners: (Czech Republic) Lukáš Krpálek (m) / (Croatia) Helena Vuković (f)

=== 2021 European Cup ===
- 20 & 21 March: European Cup #1 in (Bosnia and Herzegovina) Sarajevo

=== 2021 Panamerican Open ===
- 6 & 7 March: Panamerican Open #1 in (Chile) Santiago
- 13 & 14 March: Panamerican Open #2 in (Peru) Lima
- 20 & 21 March: Panamerican Open #3 in (Argentina) TBD

=== 2021 Asian Open ===
- 13 & 14 March: Asian Open #1 in (Kazakhstan) Aktau
  - Extra Lightweight winners: (Kazakhstan) Magzhan Shamshadin (m) / (Kazakhstan) Abiba Abuzhakynova (f)
  - Half Lightweight winners: (Kazakhstan) Yeset Kuanov (m) / (Russia) Liliia Nugaeva (f)
  - Lightweight winners: (Uzbekistan) Murodjon Yuldoshev (m) / (Russia) Yulia Kazarina (f)
  - Half Middleweight winners: (Russia) Magomed Edilbiev (m) / (Russia) Aigul Bagautdinova (f)
  - Middleweight winners: (Kazakhstan) Yersultan Muzapparov (m) / (Russia) Dali Liluashvili (f)
  - Half Heavyweight winners: (Russia) Dmitry Dovgan (m) / (Russia) Marina Bukreeva (f)
  - Heavyweight winners: (Kazakhstan) Yerassyl Kazhibayev (m) / (Russia) Daria Vladimirova (f)

== Karate ==
- TBD: 2021 World Karate Championships in Dubai, United Arab Emirates
- 2021 World Junior Karate Championships

== Kendo ==
- TBD: World Kendo Championship

== Kurash ==
- TBD: 2021 World Kurash Championships

== Luge ==
- 9 & 10 January: 2021 FIL European Luge Championships in Sigulda
  - Men's singles winner: (Germany) Felix Loch
  - Women's singles winner: (Russia) Tatiana Ivanova
  - Doubles winners: Latvia (Andris Šics & Juris Šics)
  - Team relay winners: Russia (Tatiana Ivanova, Semen Pavlichenko, Vsevolod Kashkin/Konstantin Korshunov)
- 29 – 31 January: 2021 FIL World Luge Championships in Königssee
  - Men's singles winner: Roman Repilov
  - Men's sprint winner: (Austria) Nico Gleirscher
  - Women's singles winner: (Germany) Julia Taubitz
  - Women's sprint winner: (Germany) Julia Taubitz
  - Doubles winners: Germany (Toni Eggert & Sascha Benecken)
  - Doubles' sprint winners: Germany (Tobias Wendl & Tobias Arlt)
  - Team relay winners: Austria (Madeleine Egle, David Gleirscher, Thomas Steu/Lorenz Koller)
- 1 February: FIL Junior Natural Track European Championships in Jaufental
  - Men's Junior Singles winner: (Italy) Fabian Brunner
  - Women's Junior Singles winner: (Germany) Lisa Walch
  - Doubles Juniors winners: Italy (Anton Gruber Genetti & Hannes Unterholzner)
- 12 – 14 February: 2021 FIL World Luge Natural Track Championships in (Austria) Umhausen
  - Men's Singles winner: (Austria) Thomas Kammerlander
  - Women's Singles winner: (Italy) Evelin Lanthaler
  - Doubles winners: Italy (Patrick Pigneter & Florian Clara)
  - Team Relay winners: Italy (Evelin Lanthaler & Alex Gruber)

=== 2020–21 Luge World Cup ===
- 28 & 29 November 2020: WC #1 in Innsbruck
  - Men's singles winner: (Germany) Felix Loch
  - Women's singles winner: (Germany) Julia Taubitz
  - Doubles winners: Austria (Thomas Steu & Lorenz Koller)
  - Team relay winners: Germany (Julia Taubitz, Felix Loch, Toni Eggert/Sascha Benecken)
- 5 & 6 December 2020: WC #2 in (Germany) Altenberg
  - Men's singles winner: (Germany) Felix Loch
  - Women's singles winner: (Russia) Tatiana Ivanova
  - Doubles winners: Austria (Thomas Steu & Lorenz Koller)
  - Team relay winners: Italy (Andrea Vötter, Kevin Fischnaller, Ludwig Rieder/Patrick Rastner)
- 12 & 13 December 2020: WC #3 in Oberhof
  - Men's singles winner: (Germany) Felix Loch
  - Women's singles winner: (Germany) Dajana Eitberger
  - Doubles winners: Germany (Toni Eggert & Sascha Benecken)
  - Team relay winners: Germany (Dajana Eitberger, Felix Loch, Toni Eggert/Sascha Benecken)
- 19 & 20 December 2020: WC #4 in Winterberg
  - Men's singles winner: (Germany) Felix Loch
  - Women's singles winner: (Germany) Julia Taubitz
  - Doubles winners: Germany (Tobias Wendl & Tobias Arlt)
- 2 & 3 January: WC #5 in Königsee
  - Men's singles winner: (Germany) Felix Loch
  - Women's singles winner: (Germany) Julia Taubitz
  - Doubles winners: Germany (Toni Eggert & Sascha Benecken)
  - Team relay winners: Austria (Madeleine Egle, Nico Gleirscher, Thomas Steu/Lorenz Koller)
- 9 & 10 January: WC #6 in Sigulda
  - Men's singles winner: (Germany) Felix Loch
  - Women's singles winner: (Russia) Tatiana Ivanova
  - Doubles winners: Latvia (Andris Šics & Juris Šics)
  - Team relay winners: Russia (Tatiana Ivanova, Semen Pavlichenko, Vsevolod Kashkin/Konstantin Korshunov)
- 16 & 17 January: WC #7 in (Germany) Oberhof
  - Men's singles winner: (Germany) Felix Loch
  - Women's Singles winner: (Germany) Natalie Geisenberger
  - Doubles winners: Austria (Thomas Steu & Lorenz Koller)
- 23 & 24 January: WC #8 in (Austria) Innsbruck
  - Men's singles winner: (Germany) Felix Loch
  - Women's Singles winner: (Germany) Natalie Geisenberger
  - Doubles winners: Italy (Ludwig Rieder & Patrick Rastner)
- 23 & 24 January: WC #9 in (Switzerland) St. Moritz (final)
  - Men's Singles winner: (Austria) Nico Gleirscher
  - Women's Singles winner: (Latvia) Elīna leva Vītola
  - Doubles winners: Latvia (Mārtiņš Bots & Roberts Plūme)
  - Team relay winners: cancelled due to heavy snowfall.

=== 2020–21 Luge Sprint World Cup ===
- 28 & 29 November: WC #1 in Innsbruck
  - Men's singles winner: (Germany) Felix Loch
  - Women's singles winner: (Germany) Julia Taubitz
  - Doubles winner: Austria (Thomas Steu & Lorenz Koller)
- 19 & 20 December 2020: WC #2 in Winterberg
  - Men's singles winner: (Germany) Max Langenhan
  - Women's singles winner: (Germany) Julia Taubitz
  - Doubles winners: Germany (Toni Eggert & Sascha Benecken)
- 23 & 24 January: WC #3 in (Austria) Innsbruck (final)
  - Men's singles winner: (Russia) Semen Pavlichenko
  - Women's singles winner: (Germany) Julia Taubitz
  - Doubles winners: Latvia (Andris Šics & Juris Šics)

=== 2021 FIL Junior Luge World Cup ===
- 5 January: WC #1 in (Austria) Obdach #1
  - Men's singles winner: (Italy) Fabian Brunner
  - Women's singles winner: (Germany) Lisa Walch
  - Doubles winners: Italy (Anton Gruber Genetti & Hannes Unterholzner)
- 6 January: WC #2 in Obdach #2
  - Men's singles winner: (Italy) Fabian Brunner
  - Women's singles winner: (Germany) Lisa Walch
  - Doubles winners: Austria (Maximilian Pichler & Dominik Peter Maier)
- 9 & 10 January: WC #3 in (Austria) Umhausen
  - Men's singles winner: (Italy) Fabian Brunner
  - Women's singles winner: (Germany) Lisa Walch
  - Doubles winners: Italy (Anton Gruber Genetti & Hannes Unterholzner)
- 30 & 31 January: WC #4 in Jaufental (final)
  - Men's singles winner: (Italy) Fabian Brunner
  - Women's singles winner: (Austria) Ricarda Ruetz
  - Doubles winners: Italy (Anton Gruber Genetti & Hannes Unterholzner)

=== 2020–21 Luge Natural World Cup ===
- 17 December 2020: WC #1 in (Austria) Obdach #1
  - Men's singles winner: (Austria) Michael Scheikl
  - Women's singles winner: (Italy) Evelin Lanthaler
  - Doubles winners: Italy (Patrick Pigneter & Florian Clara)
- 18 & 19 December 2020: WC #2 in (Austria) Obdach #2
  - Men's singles winner: (Austria) Michael Scheikl
  - Women's singles winner: (Italy) Evelin Lanthaler
  - Doubles winners: Italy (Patrick Pigneter & Florian Clara)
  - Team winners: Italy (Evelin Lanthaler & Patrick Pigneter)
- 14 – 17 January: WC #3 in (Austria) Passeier #1
  - Men's singles winner: (Austria) Thomas Kammerlander
  - Women's singles winner: (Italy) Evelin Lanthaler
  - Doubles winners: Italy (Evelin Lanthaler & Patrick Pigneter)
  - Men's Singles Nations Cup winner: (Italy) Mathias Troger
- 14 – 17 January: WC #4 in Passeier #2
  - Men's singles winner: (Austria) Thomas Kammerlander
  - Women's singles winner: (Italy) Evelin Lanthaler
  - Doubles winners: Austria (Fabian Achenrainer & Simon Achenrainer)
  - Team winners: Italy (Evelin Lanthaler & Patrick Pigneter)
  - Men's Singles Nations Cup winner: (Austria) Florian Markt
- 8 – 10 February: WC #5 in Laas #1
  - Men's singles winner: (Austria) Thomas Kammerlander
  - Women's singles winner: (Italy) Evelin Lanthaler
  - Doubles winners: Italy (Evelin Lanthaler & Patrick Pigneter)
  - Men's Singles Nations Cup winner: (Italy) Florian Clara
- 8 – 10 February: WC #6 in (Italy) Laas #2 (final)
  - Men's singles winner: (Austria) Thomas Kammerlander
  - Women's singles winner: (Italy) Evelin Lanthaler
  - Doubles winners: Russia (Pavel Porshnev & Ivan Lazarev)

== Modern Pentathlon ==
- 8–13 June: 2021 World Modern Pentathlon Championships in Cairo, Egypt
- TBD: 2021 Modern Pentathlon World Cup
- 2021 Modern Pentathlon Junior World Championships
- 2021 Modern Pentathlon Youth World Championships

== Motorsports ==
=== 2021 Formula One World Championship ===
- 28 March: 2021 Bahrain Grand Prix #1 Winner: (United Kingdom) Lewis Hamilton (Mercedes)
- 18 April: (Italy) 2021 Emilia Romagna Grand Prix #2 Winner: (Netherlands) Max Verstappen (Red Bull Racing)
- 2 May: (Portugal) 2021 Portuguese Grand Prix #3 Winner: (United Kingdom) Lewis Hamilton (Mercedes)
- 9 May: (Spain) 2021 Spanish Grand Prix #4 Winner: (United Kingdom) Lewis Hamilton (Mercedes)
- 23 May: 2021 Monaco Grand Prix #5 Winner: (Netherlands) Max Verstappen (Red Bull Racing)
- 6 June: 2021 Azerbaijan Grand Prix #6 Winner: (Mexico) Sergio Pérez (Red Bull Racing)
- 20 June: (France) 2021 French Grand Prix #7 Winner: (Netherlands) Max Verstappen (Red Bull Racing)
- 27 June: (Austria) 2021 Styrian Grand Prix #8 Winner: (Netherlands) Max Verstappen (Red Bull Racing)
- 4 July: (Austria) 2021 Austrian Grand Prix #9 Winner: (Netherlands) Max Verstappen (Red Bull Racing)
- 18 July: (United Kingdom) 2021 British Grand Prix #10 Winner: (United Kingdom) Lewis Hamilton (Mercedes)
- 1 August: (Hungary) 2021 Hungarian Grand Prix #11 Winner: (France) Esteban Ocon (Alpine)
- 29 August: (Belgium) 2021 Belgian Grand Prix #12 Winner: (Netherlands) Max Verstappen (Red Bull Racing)
- 5 September: (Netherlands) 2021 Dutch Grand Prix #13 Winner: (Netherlands) Max Verstappen (Red Bull Racing)
- 12 September: (Italy) 2021 Italian Grand Prix #14 Winner: (Australia) Daniel Ricciardo (McLaren)
- 26 September: (Russia) 2021 Russian Grand Prix #15 Winner: (United Kingdom) Lewis Hamilton (Mercedes)
- 10 October: (Turkey) 2021 Turkish Grand Prix #16 Winner: (Finland) Valtteri Bottas (Mercedes)
- 24 October: 2021 United States Grand Prix #17 Winner: (Netherlands) Max Verstappen (Red Bull Racing)
- 7 November: 2021 Mexico City Grand Prix #18 Winner: (Netherlands) Max Verstappen (Red Bull Racing)
- 14 November: (Brazil) 2021 São Paulo Grand Prix #19 Winner: (United Kingdom) Lewis Hamilton (Mercedes)
- 21 November: 2021 Qatar Grand Prix #20 Winner: (United Kingdom) Lewis Hamilton (Mercedes)
- 5 December: (Saudi Arabia) 2021 Saudi Arabian Grand Prix #21 Winner: (United Kingdom) Lewis Hamilton (Mercedes)
- 12 December: (United Arab Emirates) 2021 Abu Dhabi Grand Prix #22 Winner: (Netherlands) Max Verstappen (Red Bull Racing)

=== 2020–21 Formula E World Championship ===
- 26 February: 2021 Diriyah ePrix #1 Winner: (Netherlands) Nyck de Vries (Mercedes-Benz EQ Formula E Team)
- 27 February: 2021 Diriyah ePrix #2 Winner: (United Kingdom) Sam Bird (Jaguar Racing)

=== 2021 World Touring Car Cup ===
- 14 – 16 May: #1 Round at the (Hungary) Hungaroring
- 21 – 23 May: #2 Round at the Automotodróm Slovakia Ring
- 3 – 5 June: #3 Round at the (Germany) Nürburgring
- 25 – 27 June: #4 Round at the (Portugal) Circuito Internacional de Vila Real
- 9 – 11 July: #5 Round at the (Spain) Ciudad del Motor de Aragón
- 8 – 11 October: #6 Round at the (South Korea) Inje Speedium
- 5 – 7 November: #7 Round at the (China) TBD place
- 19 – 21 November: #8 Round at the (Macau) Guia Circuit (final)

=== 2021 European Autocross Championship ===
- 15 & 16 May: #1 Round in (Germany) Seelow
- 5 & 6 June: #2 Round in (Latvia) Mūša
- 12 & 13 June: #3 Round in (Lithuania) Vilkyčiai
- 26 & 27 June: #4 Round in (Germany) Matschenberg
- 3 & 4 July: #5 Round in (Czech Republic) Nová Paka
- 17 & 18 July: #6 Round in (France) Saint-Georges-de-Montaigu
- 31 July & 1 August: #7 Round in (Netherlands) Toldijk
- 21 & 22 August: #8 Round in (Czech Republic) Přerov
- 18 & 19 September: #9 Round in (France) Saint-Igny-de-Vers
- 25 & 26 September: #10 Round in (Italy) Maggiora
- 9 & 10 October: #11 Round in (Spain) Mollerussa (final)

=== 2021 European Drag Racing Championship ===
- 28 – 31 May: #1 Round at the (United Kingdom) Santa Pod Raceway #1
- 10 – 13 June: #2 Round at the (Sweden) Tierp Arena #1
- 8 – 10 July: #3 Round in (Finland) Kauhava (Top Fuel and Pro Modified Competitions only)
- 12 – 15 August: #4 Round at the (Sweden) Tierp Arena #2
- 27 – 29 August: #5 Round at the (Germany) Hockenheimring
- 9 – 12 September: #6 Round at the (United Kingdom) Santa Pod Raceway #2 (final)

=== 2021 World Rally Championship ===
- 21 – 24 January: #1 Round in (France) Gap (Monte Carlo Rally) Winner: (France) Sébastien Ogier (Toyota Gazoo Racing WRT)
- 26 – 28 February: #2 Round in Finland (Arctic Rally Finland) Winner: (Estonia) Ott Tänak (Hyundai i20 Coupe WRC)
- 22 – 25 March: #3 Round in Croatia (Croatia Rally)

=== 2021 European Rally Championship ===
- 12 – 14 March: #1 Round in Portugal (Rallye Serras de Fafe e Felgueiras)
- 25 – 27 March: #2 Round in Portugal (Rallye Açores)
- 6 – 8 May: #3 Round in Spain (Rally Islas Canarias)
- 18 – 20 June: #4 Round in Poland (Rally Poland)
- 1 – 3 July: #5 Round in Latvia (Rally Liepāja)
- 23 – 25 July: #6 Round in Italy (Rally di Roma Capitale)
- 27 – 29 August: #7 Round in Czech Republic (Barum Czech Rally Zlín)
- 22 – 24 October: #8 Round in Hungary (Rally Hungary) (final)

=== 2021 European Truck Racing Championship ===
- 22 & 23 May: #1 Round at the (Italy) Misano
- 12 & 13 June: #2 Round at the (Hungary) Hungaroring
- 17 & 18 July: #3 Round at the (Germany) Nürburgring
- 28 & 29 August: #4 Round at the (Czech Republic) Most
- 11 & 12 September: #5 Round at the (Belgium) Zolder
- 25 & 26 September: #6 Round at the (France) Le Mans
- 2 & 3 October: #7 Round at the (Spain) Jarama (final)

=== Dakar Rally ===
- 3 – 15 January: 2021 Dakar Rally in Saudi Arabia
  - Trucks winner: (Russia) Dmitry Sotnikov (Kamaz Master)
  - SSV/Light prototype winner: (Chile) Francisco López Contardo (South Racing Can-Am)
  - Cars winner: (France) Stéphane Peterhansel (MINI John Cooper Works Rally – X-raid)
  - Quads winner: (Argentina) Manuel Andújar (Team 7240)
  - Bikes winner: (Argentina) Kevin Benavides (Monster Energy Honda Team)
  - Classics winner: (France) Marc Douton (Team Sunhill-R)

=== 2021 FIA World Cup for Cross-Country Bajas ===
- 4 – 7 February: #1 Round in the Baja Russia – Northern Forest Winners: Vladimir Vasilyev & Alexey Kuzmich (G-Energy Team)
- 18 – 20 February: #2 Round at the (United Arab Emirates) Dubai International Baja Winners: (Saudi Arabia) Yazeed Al-Rajhi & (United Kingdom) Michael Orr (Overdrive SA)
- 4 – 6 March: #3 Round at the (Saudi Arabia) Sharqiya Baja Winners: (Saudi Arabia) Yasir Seaidan & (Russia) Alexey Kuzmich (Race World)
- 18 – 20 March: #4 Round at the Jordan Baja
- 23 & 24 July: #5 Round at the (Spain) Baja Aragón
- 12 – 15 August: #6 Round at the (Hungary) Hungarian Baja
- 26 – 29 August: #7 Round at the Baja Poland
- 9 – 12 September: #8 Round at the (Italy) Italian Baja
- 28 – 30 October: #9 Round at the (Portugal) Baja Portalegre 500

=== 2021 Extreme E Championship ===
- 3 – 4 April: 2021 Desert X-Prix in (Saudi Arabia) Al-'Ula
  - Winners: (Sweden) Johan Kristoffersson / (Australia) Molly Taylor ( (Germany) Rosberg X Racing)
- 29 – 30 May: 2021 Ocean X-Prix in (Senegal) Lac Rose
- 28 – 29 August: 2021 Arctic X-Prix in (Greenland) Kangerlussuaq
- 23 – 24 October: 2021 Amazon X-Prix in (Brazil) Santarém
- 11 – 12 December: 2021 Glacier X-Prix in (Argentina) Ushuaia

== Mountain running ==
- 22 May: the Gansu ultramarathon disaster in the Yellow River Stone Forest, China led 21 runners to die from hypothermia.
- TBD: 2021 World Mountain Running Championships
- TBD: 2021 World Long Distance Mountain Running Championships
- TBD: 2021 IAU Trail World Championships
- 2021 World Mountain & Trail Running Championships

== Muay Thai ==
- TBD:2021 IFMA World Muaythai Championships

== Multi-sport events ==
- 23 July – 8 August: 2020 Summer Olympics in Tokyo, Japan
- 24 August – 5 September: 2020 Summer Paralympics in Tokyo, Japan
- 30 July – 8 August: 2021 World Police and Fire Games in Rotterdam, Netherlands
- August: 2021 Junior Pan American Games in Cali, Colombia
- 10–19 September: 2021 Islamic Solidarity Games in Konya, Turkey
- 21 November – 2 December: 2021 Southeast Asian Games in Hanoi, Vietnam
- 11–18 December: 2021 European Youth Olympic Winter Festival in Vuokatti, Finland
- TBD: 2021 Winter Universiade in Lucerne, Switzerland
- TBD: 2021 Asian Winter Games
- TBD: 2021 Winter Military World Games in Berchtesgaden, Germany
- TBD: 2021 Island Games in Guernsey
- TBD: 2021 Asian School's Sports Games
- TBD: 2021 Lusophony Games in Luanda, Angola
- TBD: 2021 African Para Games
- TBD: 2021 Asian Youth Para Games in Manama, Bahrain
- TBD: 2021 Central American Games in Santa Tecla, El Salvador
- TBD: 2021 Central Asian Games
- TBD: 2021 European Universities Games
- TBD: 2021 International Children's Games
- TBD: 2021 International Children's Games (Winter)
- TBD: 2021 Pan American Masters Games
- TBD: 2021 Youth Parapan American Games
- TBD: 2021 South American Beach Games
- TBD: 2021 South American University Games
- TBD: 2021 South American Youth Games
- TBD: 2021 World Martial Arts Games
- TBD: 2021 World Combat Games
- TBD: 2021 World Masters Games postponed to 2022
- TBD: 2021 World Urban Games
- TBD: 2021 World Senior Games

== Netball ==
International tournaments

Date	Tournament	Winners	Runners up
20–24 January	2021 Netball Legends Series	England	Superleague All-Stars
2–7 March	2021 Constellation Cup	New Zealand	Australia
24–31 March	2021 SPAR Challenge Series	South Africa	Uganda
20–24 September	2021 Taini Jamison Trophy Series	England	New Zealand
28 Nov–5 Dec	2021 England Jamaica netball series	England	Jamaica

Major national leagues

Host	League	Winners	Runners up
Australia	Suncorp Super Netball	New South Wales Swifts	Giants Netball
New Zealand	ANZ Premiership	Northern Mystics	Mainland Tactix
United Kingdom	Netball Superleague	Loughborough Lightning	Team Bath

== Nordic Combined ==
- 9 – 14 February: 2021 Nordic Junior World Ski Championships in (Finland) Vuokatti and Lahti
  - Winners: (Austria) Johannes Lamparter (m) / (Norway) Gyda Westvold Hansen (f)
  - Team winners: Norway (Eidar Johan Strøm, Marte Leinan Lund, Gyda Westvold Hansen, Andreas Skoglund)
- 22 February – 7 March: FIS Nordic World Ski Championships 2021 in (Germany) Obersdorf
  - Men's winners: (Norway) Jarl Magnus Riiber (No. 1) / (Austria) Johannes Lamparter (No. 2)
  - Women's winner: (Norway) Gyda Westvold Hansen
  - Men's Ski Jump Team winners: Norway (Espen Bjørnstad, Jørgen Graabak, Jens Lurås Oftebro, Jarl Magnus Riiber)
  - Men's Team Sprint winners: Austria (Johannes Lamparter & Lukas Greiderer)

=== 2020–21 FIS Nordic Combined World Cup ===
- 26–29 November 2020: WC #1 in (Finland) Ruka (Men's only)
  - Winners: (Norway) Jarl Magnus Riiber (2 times) / (Norway) Jens Lurås Oftebro (No. 3)
- 4 – 6 December 2020: WC #2 in (Norway) Lillehammer
  - Event cancelled.
- 17 – 20 December 2020: WC #3 in (Austria) Ramsau
  - Men's winner: (Germany) Vinzenz Geiger (2 times)
  - Women's winner: (United States) Tara Geraghty-Moats
- 2 & 3 January: WC #4 in (Estonia) Otepää
  - Event cancelled.
- 14 – 17 January: WC #5 in (Italy) Val di Fiemme (Men's only)
  - Winners: (Norway) Jarl Magnus Riiber (2 times)
  - Team Sprint winners: Germany I (Eric Frenzel & Fabian Rießle)
- 22 – 24 January: WC #6 in (Finland) Lahti (Men's only)
  - Winner: (Japan) Akito Watabe
  - Team Sprint winners: Norway I (Jørgen Graabak & Jarl Magnus Riiber)
- 28 – 31 January: WC #7 in (Austria) Seefeld
  - Winners: (Norway) Jarl Magnus Riiber (3 times)
- 5 – 7 February: WC #8 in (Germany) Klingenthal
  - Men's winner: (Germany) Vinzenz Geiger (2 times)

=== 2020–21 FIS Nordic Combined Alpen Cup ===
- 17 & 18 October 2020: OPA #1 in (Germany) Klingenthal
  - Men's winner: (Austria) Fabian Hafner (2 times)
  - Women's winners: (Germany) Jenny Nowak (No. 1) / (Austria) Sigrun Kleinrath (No. 2)
- 19 & 20 December 2020: OPA #2 in (Austria) Seefeld
  - Men's winners: (Austria) Samuel Lev (No. 1) / (Italy) Iacopo Bortolas (No. 2)
  - Women's winner: (Austria) Sigrun Kleinrath (2 times)
- 20 & 21 February: OPA #3 in (Austria) Ramsau (final)
  - Men's winners: (Austria) Florian Kolb (No. 1) / (France) Marco Heinis (No. 2)

=== 2020–21 FIS Nordic Combined Continental Cup ===
- 11 – 13 December 2020: CC #1 in (United States) Park City
  - Men's winners: (Germany) Jakob Lange (No. 1) / (Germany) Julian Schmid (No. 2)
  - Mass Start winner: (Germany) Julian Schmid
- 15 – 17 January: CC #2 in (Germany) Klingenthal
  - Men's winners: (Norway) Simen Tiller (2 times) / (Austria) Manuel Einkemmer (No. 2)
- 22 – 24 January: CC #3 in (Austria) Eisenerz
  - Men's winners: (Austria) Stefan Rettenegger (No. 1) / (Norway) Espen Andersen (No. 2) / (Norway) Leif Torbjørn Næsvold (No. 3)
  - Women's winner: (Norway) Gyda Westvold Hansen (3 times)
- 6 & 7 February: CC #4 in (Finland) Lahti
  - Winners: (Norway) Andreas Skoglund (No. 1) / (Norway) Lars Buraas (No. 2)
- 12 – 14 March: CC #5 in (Russia) Nizhny Tagil
  - Men's winners: (Germany) Terence Weber (2 times)
  - Women's winner: (United States) Tara Geraghty-Moats (2 times)
  - Mass Start winners: (Germany) Terence Weber (m) / (United States) Tara Geraghty-Moats (f)
- 12 – 14 March: CC #6 in (France) Prémanon
  - Men's winners: (Austria) Stefan Rettenegger (2 times)
  - Women's winner: (Italy) Annika Sieff (2 times)

== Orienteering ==
- 4–9 July: 2021 World Orienteering Championships in Doksy, Czech Republic
- TBD: 2021 World Ski Orienteering Championships
- TBD: 2021 Orienteering World Cup
- TBD: 2021 World Mountain Bike Orienteering Championships
- TBD: 2021 World Trail Orienteering Championships
- 2021 Junior World Orienteering Championships

== Pickleball ==
- Major League Pickleball (MLP) was established, the first professional level league format in the sport.
- 7 – 11 April: 2021 Bainbridge Cup in Holly Hill, Florida
- 6 – 14 December: 2021 Margaritaville USA Pickleball National Championships in Indian Wells, California

== Racquetball ==
- 29 November – 6 December: 2021 Racquetball World Championships in Guatemala City
  - Men's singles: (United States) Alejandro Landa def. (Costa Rica) Andrés Acuña, 15–6, 15–6.
  - Women's singles: (Mexico) Paola Longoria def. (United States) Kelani Lawrence, 15–6, 15–1.
  - Men's doubles: (Mexico) Javier Mar & Rodrigo Montoya def. (Bolivia) Koko Keller & Conrrado Moscoso, 15–10, 15–9.
  - Women's doubles: (Mexico) Paola Longoria & Samantha Salas def. (Bolivia) Koko Keller & Conrrado Moscoso, 15–10, 15–9.

=== IRT ===
Grand Slam

- 7 – 10 January: Suivant Consulting Pro Am in (Georgia (U.S. state)) Lilburn
  - Singles: (Canada) Samuel Murray def. (Bolivia) Conrrado Moscoso, 15–7, 8–15, 11–9.
  - Doubles: (United States) Sudsy Monchik & (Mexico) Alejandro Landa def. (Colombia) Eduardo Garay & (Colombia) Sebastian Franco, 15–12, 14–15, 11–6.

Tier 4

- 17 – 20 September 2020: Atlanta Open in (Georgia (U.S. state)) Lilburn
  - Singles: (Mexico) Daniel de la Rosa def. (Mexico) Alejandro Landa, 14–15, 15–11, 11–4.
  - Doubles: (Colombia) Juan Pablo Rodríguez & (Colombia) Eduardo Garay def. (Georgia (U.S. state)) Maurice Miller & (Colombia) Mario Mercado, 15–13, 15–8.

Tier 5

- 25 & 26 July 2020: Georgia Games in (Georgia (U.S. state)) Lilburn
  - Singles: (Colombia) Eduardo Garay def. (Georgia (U.S. state)) Maurice Miller, 15–9, 15–11.
- 23 & 24 October 2020: Warhawk Open at ULM in (Louisiana) Monroe
  - Singles: (Georgia (U.S. state)) Maurice Miller def. (Texas) Zachary Williams, 15–8, 15–4.
  - Doubles: (Georgia (U.S. state)) Maurice Miller & (Georgia (U.S. state)) Michael Miller Jr. def. (Texas) Michael Magana & (Texas) Zachary Williams, 15–14, 8–15, 11–3.
- 12 – 15 November 2020: Southern Open in (Georgia (U.S. state)) Lilburn
  - Singles: (Georgia (U.S. state)) Austin Cunningham def. (Florida) Timothy Baghurst, No show.
- 4 – 6 December 2020: 30th Annual Turkey Shootout Racquetball Tournament in (Kansas) Garden City
  - 1st. (Kansas) Bradly Rogers, 2nd. (Colorado) Nicholas Riffel, 3rd. (Kansas) Jared Torres
- 19 – 21 February: 2021 Peachtree OPEN in (Georgia (U.S. state)) Atlanta

Outdoor

- 14 – 18 October 2020: 2020 3WallBall World Championships in (United States) Las Vegas
  - Singles: (Mexico) Andree Parrilla def. (Bolivia) Marcelo Vargas Aguilar, 15–5, 15–8.
  - Doubles: (Mexico) Álvaro Beltrán & (Mexico) Daniel de la Rosa def. (United States) Ben Croft & (Canada) Kane Waselenchuk, 12–15, 15–9, 11–8.
  - Mixed Doubles: (Mexico) Daniel de la Rosa & (United States) Michelle De La Rosa def. (Colombia) Mario Mercado & (Colombia) Adriana Riveros, 15–8, 15–0.

=== LPRT ===
Super Max Slam

- 4 – 6 December 2020: TeamRoot.com Tournament in Kansas City
  - Singles: (Mexico) Paola Longoria def. (Bolivia) Angelica Barrios, 15–5, 15–9.
  - Doubles: (Argentina) Natalia Méndez & (Argentina) Valeria Centellas def. (Mexico) Paola Longoria & (Mexico) Samantha Salas, 15–14, 3–15, 11–2.

Outdoor

- 15 – 19 October 2020: 2020 3WallBall World Championships in (United States) Las Vegas
  - Singles: (Mexico) Paola Longoria def. (United States) Rhonda Rajsich, 4–15, 15–4, 11–4.
  - Doubles: (Mexico) Paola Longoria & (United States) Janel Tisinger def. (Chile) Carla Muñoz & (United States) Michelle De La Rosa, 12–15, 15–9, 11–5.
  - Mixed Doubles: (Mexico) Daniel de la Rosa & (United States) Michelle De La Rosa def. (Colombia) Mario Mercado & (Colombia) Adriana Riveros, 15–8, 15–0.

== Roller skating ==
=== World Skate America ===
- 4 – 14 February: Pan American of Clubs and Nations Championship in Ibagué (Speed Skating)
  - Clubs winner: (Colombia) Tequendama AC
  - Nations: Colombia won overall gold medals and overall medal tally.
- 22 – 28 February: Pan American of Nations Championship in (Colombia) Bogotá (Inline Hockey)
- 12 – 25 April: Pan American of Clubs and Nations Championship in (Ecuador) Guayaquil (Artistic Skating)
- 16 – 26 September: Roller Hockey Pan American Championships in (United States) Florida

== Rowing ==
- TBD: 2021 World Rowing Championships in Shanghai, China
- TBD: 2021 World Rowing Cup
- 2021 World Rowing Junior Championships
- 2021 World Rowing U23 Championships

== Rugby league ==
- 2021 Rugby League World Cup in England
- 2021 NRL season in Australasia
- Super League XXVI in Europe

== Rugby Union ==
- 6 February – 20 March: (England) / (France) / (Republic of Ireland) / (Italy) / (Scotland) / (Wales) 2021 Six Nations Championship
- 5 – 13 March: (Hong Kong) / (Japan) / (Kazakhstan) 2021 Women's Asia Rugby Championship
- 18 September – 16 October: 2021 Rugby World Cup in New Zealand
- 2021 World Rugby Under 20 Championship

=== 2020–21 Pro14 ===
- 2 October 2020 – 27 March: (Republic of Ireland) / (Italy) / (Scotland) / (Wales) 2020–21 Pro14

=== ECPR ===
- 12 December 2020 – 22 May: 2020–21 European Rugby Champions Cup (final in (France) Marseille)
- 11 December 2020 – 21 May: 2020–21 European Rugby Challenge Cup (final in (France) Marseille)

== Sailing ==
- 2020-2021 Vendee Globe
- 16–21 August: 2021 Raceboard World Championships in (Latvia) Riga
- 22–28 August: 2021 Platu 25 World Championship in (Lithuania) Nida
- 29 November – 6 December: 2021 Laser Radial World Championships in (Oman) Al-Musannah
- 8–12 December: 2021 Melges 20 World Championship in (United States) Miami

=== 2021 World Match Racing Tour ===
- 30 April – 2 May: Szczecin Match Race in (Poland) Szczecin

== Savate ==
=== World Savate Combat Championships ===
- Men's −56 kg: (France) Ahmad Ferradji defeated (Spain) Rubén Batan
- Men's −70 kg: (France) Amine Feddal defeated (Ukraine) Oleksandr Brachykov
- Men's −75 kg: (France) Damien Fabregas defeated (Ukraine) Mykyta Radionov
- Men's −80 kg: (France) Alexis Nicolas defeated (Ukraine) Anton Chernikov
- Men's −85 kg: (France) Christopher Brugiroux defeated (Mauritius) Olivier Lafleur
- Women's −52 kg: (France) Marine Nicol defeated (Ukraine) Anastasia Konovalchuk
- Women's −56 kg: (France) Mathilde Mignier defeated (Croatia) Lucija Regvat
- Women's −60 kg: (France) Sara Tebbakh defeated (Italy) Chiara Vincis
- Women's −65 kg: (France) Audrey Guillaume defeated (Serbia) Jelena Sedoglavić

== Shooting Sports ==
=== 2021 ISSF World Cup ===
- 22 February – 5 March: WC #1 in (Egypt) Cairo
  - Skeet winners: (Ukraine) Mykola Milchev (m) / (Slovakia) Danka Barteková (f)

=== 2021 ISSF Grand Prix ===
- 28 January – 6 February: ISSF Grand Prix Shotgun in (Morocco) Rabat
  - Skeet winners: (Qatar) Rashid Saleh Hamad (m) / (Russia) Alina Fazylzyanova (f)
  - Trap winners: (Russia) Maxim Kabatskiy (m) / (Russia) Ekaterina Subbotina (f)
  - Mixed Trap winners: Spain 1 (Alberto Fernández & Fátima Gálvez)
  - Mixed Skeet winners: Russia 1 (Natalia Vinogradova & Aleksei Skorobogatov)

== Ski jumping ==
- 11–13 December 2020: FIS Ski Flying World Championships 2020 in (Slovenia) Planica
  - Men's winner: (Germany) Karl Geiger
  - Men's team winners: Norway (Daniel-André Tande, Johann André Forfang. Robert Johansson, Halvor Egner Granerud)
- 9 – 14 February: 2021 Nordic Junior World Ski Championships in (Finland) Vuokatti and Lahti
  - Winners: (Austria) Niklas Bachlinger (m) / (Norway) Thea Minyan Bjørseth (f)
  - Team winners: Austria (David Haagen, Daniel Tschofenig, Elias Medwed, Niklas Bachlinger) (m) / Austria (Hannah Wiegele, Vanessa Moharitsch, Julia Mühlbacher, Lisa Eder)
- 22 February – 7 March: FIS Nordic World Ski Championships 2021 in Obersdorf
  - Men's winner: (Poland) Piotr Żyła (No. 1) / (Austria) Stefan Kraft (No. 2)
  - Women's winners: (Slovenia) Ema Klinec (No. 1) / (Norway) Maren Lundby (No. 2)
  - Men's Team winners: Germany (Pius Paschke, Severin Freund, Markus Eisenbichler, Karl Geiger)
  - Women's Team winners: Austria (Daniela Iraschko-Stolz, Sophie Sorschag, Chiara Hölzl, Marita Kramer)
  - Mixed Team winners: Germany (Katharina Althaus, Markus Eisenbichler, Anna Rupprecht, Karl Geiger)

=== Four Hills Tournament ===
- 28 December 2020 – 6 January: 2020–21 Four Hills Tournament in Germany and Austria
  - 28 & 29 December 2020: FH #1 in (Germany) Oberstdorf
    - Men's winner: (Germany) Karl Geiger
  - 31 December 2020 & 1 January: FH #2 in (Germany) Garmisch-Partenkirchen
    - Men's winner: (Poland) Dawid Kubacki
  - 2 & 3 January: FH #3 in (Austria) Innsbruck
    - Men's winner: (Poland) Kamil Stoch
  - 5 & 6 January: FH #4 in (Austria) Bischofshofen
    - Men's winner: (Poland) Kamil Stoch
  - Overall Men's winner: (Poland) Kamil Stoch

=== 2020–21 FIS Ski Jumping World Cup ===
- 20 – 22 November 2020: World Cup #1 in (Poland) Wisła (Men's only)
  - Men's winner: (Germany) Markus Eisenbichler
  - Men's team winners: Austria (Michael Hayböck, Philipp Aschenwald, Daniel Huber, Stefan Kraft)
- 27 – 29 November 2020: World Cup #2 in (Finland) Ruka (Men's only)
  - Men's winners: (Germany) Markus Eisenbichler (No. 1) / (Norway) Halvor Egner Granerud (No. 2)
- 4–6 December 2020: World Cup #3 in (Russia) Nizhny Tagil (Men's only)
  - Men's winner: (Norway) Halvor Egner Granerud (2 times)
- 17 – 20 December 2020: World Cup #4 in (Austria) Ramsau (Women's only)
  - Women's winner: (Austria) Marita Kramer
- 18 – 20 December 2020: World Cup #5 in (Switzerland) Engelberg
  - Men's winner: (Norway) Halvor Egner Granerud (2 times)
- 8 – 10 January: World Cup #6 in (Germany) Titisee-Neustadt (Men's only)
  - Men's winners: (Poland) Kamil Stoch (No. 1) / (Norway) Halvor Egner Granerud (No. 2)
- 15 – 17 January: World Cup #7 in (Poland) Zakopane (Men's only)
  - Men's winner: (Norway) Marius Lindvik
  - Team winners: Austria (Michael Hayböck, Jan Hörl, Philipp Aschenwald, Daniel Huber)
- 22 – 24 January: World Cup #8 in (Finland) Lahti (Men's only)
  - Men's winner: (Norway) Robert Johansson
  - Team winners: Norway (Marius Lindvik, Daniel-André Tande, Robert Johansson, Halvor Egner Granerud)
- 22 – 24 January: World Cup #9 in Ljubno ob Savinji (Women's only)
  - Women's winner: (Norway) Eirin Maria Kvandal
  - Team winners: Slovenia (Ema Klinec, Špela Rogelj, Urša Bogataj, Nika Križnar)
- 29 – 31 January: World Cup #10 in (Germany) Willingen (Men's only)
  - Men's winner: (Norway) Halvor Egner Granerud (2 times)
- 30 & 31 January: World Cup #11 in (Germany) Titisee-Neustadt (Women's only)
  - Women's winner: (Austria) Marita Kramer (2 times)
- 4 – 7 February: World Cup #12 in (Austria) Hinzenbach (Women's only)
  - Women's winners: (Slovenia) Nika Križnar (No. 1) / (Japan) Sara Takanashi (2 times)
- 5 – 7 February: World Cup #13 in (Germany) Klingenthal
  - Men's winner: (Norway) Halvor Egner Granerud (2 times)
- 12 – 14 February: World Cup #14 in (Poland) Zakopane (Men's only)
  - Men's winners: (Japan) Ryoyu Kobayashi (No. 1) / (Norway) Halvor Egner Granerud (No. 2)
- 18 – 20 February: World Cup #15 in (Romania) Râșnov
  - Men's winner: (Japan) Ryoyu Kobayashi
  - Women's winners: (Slovenia) Nika Križnar (No. 1) / (Japan) Sara Takanashi (No. 2)
  - Mixed Team winners: Norway (Maren Lundby, Daniel-André Tande, Silje Opseth, Halvor Egner Granerud)
- 18 – 21 March: World Cup #16 in (Russia) Nizhny Tagil (Women's only)
  - Winner: (Austria) Marita Kramer (2 times)

=== 2020 FIS Ski Jumping Grand Prix ===
- 14 & 15 August 2020: GP #1 in (Czech Republic) Frenštát pod Radhoštěm (women's only)
  - Winner: (Slovenia) Nika Križnar
- 21 – 23 August 2020: GP #2 in (Poland) Wisła (Men's only)
  - Winner #1: (Poland) Dawid Kubacki
  - Winner #2: (Poland) Dawid Kubacki

=== 2020–21 FIS Ski Jumping Continental Cup ===
- 18 & 19 September 2020: COC #1 in (Poland) Wisła (Men's only)
  - Winner: (Germany) Martin Hamann (2 times)
- 18 – 20 December 2020: COC #2 in (Finland) Ruka (Men's only)
  - Men's winners: (Austria) Stefan Rainer (2 times) / (Austria) Jan Hörl (No. 2)
- 27 & 28 December 2020: COC #3 in (Switzerland) Engelberg (Men's only)
  - Men's winners: (Poland) Jakub Wolny (No. 1) / (Austria) Maximilian Steiner (No. 2)
- 16 & 17 January: COC #4 in (Austria) Innsbruck (Men's only)
  - Men's winners: (Poland) Aleksander Zniszczoł (No. 1) / (Switzerland) Simon Ammann (No. 2)
- 5 – 7 February: COC #5 in (Germany) Willingen (Men's only)
  - Men's winner: (Austria) Ulrich Wohlgenannt (4 times)
- 13 & 14 February: COC #6 in (Germany) Klingenthal (Men's only)
  - Men's winner: (Austria) Markus Schiffner (2 times)
- 20 & 21 February: COC #7 in (Germany) Brotterode
  - Men's winners: (Poland) Stefan Hula Jr. (No. 1) / (Poland) Tomasz Pilch (No. 2)
  - Women's winners: (Austria) Hannah Wiegele (2 times)
- 13 & 14 March: COC #8 in (Poland) Zakopane
  - Men's winners: (Austria) Ulrich Wohlgenannt (2 times)

=== 2020–21 FIS Ski Jumping Alpen Cup ===
- 12 & 13 September 2020: OPA #1 in (Germany) Berchtesgaden
  - Winners #1: (Slovenia) Žak Mogel (m) / (Slovenia) Jerneja Repinc Zupančič
  - Winners #2: (Austria) Niklas Bachlinger (m) / (Czech Republic) Klára Ulrichová
- 18 & 19 December 2020: OPA #2 in (Austria) Seefeld
  - Men's winner: (Austria) Elias Medwed (2 times)
  - Women's winner: (Slovenia) Nika Prevc (2 times)
- 23 & 24 January: OPA #3 in (Germany) Oberhof
  - Men's winners: (Austria) David Haagen (No. 1) / (Austria) Daniel Tschofenig (No. 2)
  - Women's winner: (Austria) Hannah Wiegele (2 times)
- 20 & 21 February: OPA #4 in (Austria) Ramsau (Men's only)
  - Men's winners: (Austria) Markus Müller (No. 1) / (Austria) Jonas Schuster (No. 2)
- 12 – 14 March: OPA #5 in (France) Prémanon
  - Men's winners: (Austria) Markus Müller (No. 1) / (Austria) Julijan Smid (No. 2)
  - Women's winners: (France) Joséphine Pagnier (No. 1) / (Slovenia) Nika Prevc (No. 2)

=== 2020–21 FIS Ski Cup ===
- 3 & 4 October 2020: FC #1 in (Romania) Râșnov
  - Men's winners: (Ukraine) Yevhen Marusiak (No. 1) / (Ukraine) Vitaliy Kalinichenko (No. 2)
  - Women's competitions are cancelled.
- 11 – 13 December 2020: FC #2 in (Switzerland) Kandersteg
  - Men's winner: (Austria) Niklas Bachlinger (2 times)
  - Women's winners: (France) Julia Clair (No. 1) / (France) Joséphine Pagnier (No. 2)
- 9 & 10 January: FC #3 in (Poland) Zakopane (Only men's)
  - Men's winner: (Austria) Elias Medwed (2 times)
- 19 & 20 January: FC #4 in (Poland) Szczyrk (Only men's)
  - Men's winners: (Germany) Richard Freitag (No. 1) / (Germany) Philipp Raimund (No. 2)
- 6 & 7 February: FC #5 in (Finland) Lahti (Only men's)
  - Winners: (Austria) Hannes Landerer (No. 1) / (Switzerland) Dominik Peter (No. 2)
- 20 & 21 February: FC #6 in (Austria) Villach
  - Men's winner: (Austria) Maximilian Ortner (2 times)
  - Women's winners: (Slovenia) Tinkara Komar (No. 1) / (Czech Republic) Štěpánka Ptáčková (No. 2)
- 26 & 27 February: FC #7 in (Germany) Oberhof (final)
  - Men's winners: (Austria) Maximilian Ortner (No. 1) / (Austria) Francisco Mörth (No. 2)
  - Women's winner: (Slovenia) Jerneja Repinc Zupančič (2 times)

== Ski Mountaineering ==
- 1 – 6 March:2021 World Championship of Ski Mountaineering in (Andorra) La Massana

=== 2020–21 ISMF World Cup ===
- 19 & 20 December 2020: WC #1 in (Italy) Pontedilegno Tonale
  - Sprint Race winners: (France) Thibault Anselmet (m) / (Switzerland) Marianne Fatton (f)
  - Women's Vertical Long Race winner: (France) Axelle Mollaret

== Snooker ==
2020–21 snooker season
World Seniors Tour

- 19 – 22 August 2020: 2020 World Seniors Championship in (England) Sheffield
  - In the final, (England) Jimmy White defeated (Republic of Ireland) Ken Doherty, 5–4.

WR

- 13 September – 30 October 2020: 2020 Championship League in (England) Milton Keynes
  - (England) Kyren Wilson defeated (England) Judd Trump, 3–1.
- 21 – 27 September 2020: 2020 European Masters in (England) Milton Keynes
  - In the final, (England) Mark Selby defeated (England) Martin Gould, 9–8.
- 12 – 18 October 2020: 2020 English Open in (England) Milton Keynes
  - (England) Judd Trump defeated (Australia) Neil Robertson, 9–8.
- 16 – 22 November 2020: 2020 Northern Ireland Open in (England) Milton Keynes
  - (England) Judd Trump defeated (England) Ronnie O'Sullivan, 9–7.
- 23 November – 6 December 2020: 2020 UK Championship in (England) Milton Keynes
  - (Australia) Neil Robertson defeated (England) Judd Trump, 10–9.
- 7 – 13 December 2020: 2020 Scottish Open in (England) Milton Keynes
  - (England) Mark Selby defeated (England) Ronnie O'Sullivan, 9–3.
- 14 – 20 December 2020: 2020 World Grand Prix in (England) Milton Keynes
  - (England) Judd Trump defeated (England) Jack Lisowski, 10–7.
- 17 April – 3 May: 2021 World Snooker Championship in (England) Sheffield

NR

- 2 – 8 November 2020: 2020 Champion of Champions in (England) Milton Keynes
  - (Northern Ireland) Mark Allen defeated (Australia) Neil Robertson, 10–6.

== Snowboard ==
- 19 – 21 December 2020: FIS Snowboarding Junior World Championships in (Austria) Schönberg-Lachtal
  - Parallel Slalom winners: (Russia) Dmitry Loginov (m) / (Russia) Sofia Nadyrshina (f)
  - Parallel Giant Slalom winners: (Russia) Dmitry Loginov (m) / (Russia) Sofia Nadyrshina (f)
- 9 February – 16 March: FIS Freestyle Ski and Snowboarding World Championships 2021 in (Sweden) Idre, (Slovenia) Rogla, (Kazakhstan) Almaty and (United States) Aspen
  - Snowboard Cross winners: (Spain) Lucas Eguibar (m) / (United Kingdom) Charlotte Bankes (f)
  - Team Snowboard Cross winners: Australia (Jarryd Hughes & Belle Brockhoff)
  - Parallel Giant Slalom winners: (RSF flag) Dmitry Loginov (m) / (Germany) Selina Jörg (f)
  - Parallel Slalom winners: (Austria) Benjamin Karl (m) / (RSF flag) Sofia Nadyrshina (f)
  - Slopestyle winners: (Norway) Marcus Kleveland (m) / (New Zealand) Zoi Sadowski-Synnott (f)
  - Halfpipe winners: (Japan) Yuto Totsuka (m) / (United States) Chloe Kim (f)
  - Big Air winners: (Canada) Mark McMorris (m) / (Canada) Laurie Blouin (f)
- 15 – 28 March: 2021 FIS Snowboarding Junior World Championships in Krasnoyarsk
  - Parallel giant slalom winners: (Russia) Iaroslav Stepanko (m) / (Russia) Sofia Nadyrshina (f)
  - Parallel team winners: Russia I (Iaroslav Stepanko, Sofia Nadyrshina)
  - Parallel slalom winners: (Russia) Vsevolod Martynov (m) / (Russia) Sofia Nadyrshina (f)
  - Halfpipe winners: (Japan) Kaishu Nakagawa (m) / (Japan) Manon Kaji (f)
  - Snowboard cross winners: (Canada) Éliot Grondin (m) / (Czech Republic) Sára Strnadová (f)
  - Snowboard cross team winners: Russia II (Daniil Donskikh, Valeriya Komnatnaya)
  - Big air winners: (Japan) Taiga Hasegawa (m) / (Japan) Yura Murase (f)
  - Slopestyle winners: (Japan) Rikuto Watanabe (m) / (Belgium) Evy Poppe (f)

=== 2020–21 FIS Snowboard World Cup ===
Snowboard Cross

- 22 – 24 January: WC #1 in (Italy) Chiesa in Valmalenco
  - Men's winners: (Netherlands) Glenn de Blois (No. 1) / (Austria) Alessandro Hämmerle (No. 2)
  - Women's winners: (Italy) Michela Moioli (No. 1) / (Czech Republic) Eva Samková (No. 2)
- 16 – 18 February: WC #2 in (Austria) Reiteralm
  - Winners: (Austria) Alessandro Hämmerle (m) / (Italy) Michela Moioli (f)
- 3 – 5 March: WC #3 in (Georgia (country)) Bakuriani
  - Men's winners: (Canada) Éliot Grondin (No. 1) / (Italy) Omar Visintin (No. 2)
  - Women's winners: (Czech Republic) Eva Samková (No. 1) / (United Kingdom) Charlotte Bankes (No. 2)

Parallel Snowboard

- 12 December 2020: WC #1 in (Italy) Cortina d'Ampezzo
  - Winners: (Italy) Roland Fischnaller (m) / (Czech Republic) Ester Ledecká (f)
- 17 December 2020: WC #2 in (Italy) Carezza
  - Winners: (Austria) Benjamin Karl (m) / (Germany) Ramona Theresia Hofmeister (f)
- 9 January: WC #3 in (Switzerland) Scuol
  - Winners: (Russia) Igor Sluev (m) / (Russia) Sofia Nadyrshina (f)
- 12 & 13 January: WC #4 in Bad Gastein
  - Winners: (Italy) Aaron March (m) / (Russia) Sofia Nadyrshina (f)
  - Team winners: Austria I (Andreas Prommegger & Claudia Riegler)
- 30 January: WC #5 in (Russia) Moscow
  - Winners: (Russia) Dmitriy Karlagachev (m) / (Austria) Daniela Ulbing (f)
- 6 & 7 February: WC #6 in (Russia) Bannoye
  - Parallel Giant Slalom winners: (Russia) Dmitry Loginov (m) / (Germany) Ramona Theresia Hofmeister (f)
  - Parallel Slalom winners: (Russia) Dmitry Loginov (m) / (Switzerland) Julie Zogg (f)
- 6 March: WC #7 in (Slovenia) Rogla
  - Winners: (Slovenia) Žan Košir (m) / (Germany) Ramona Theresia Hofmeister (f)

Halfpipe

- 19 – 23 January: WC #1 in (Switzerland) Laax
  - Winners: (Japan) Yūto Totsuka (m) / (United States) Chloe Kim (f)
- 18 – 21 March: WC #2 in (United States) Aspen
  - Winners: (Japan) Yūto Totsuka (m) / (United States) Chloe Kim (f)

Slopestyle

- 19 – 23 January: WC #1 in (Switzerland) Laax
  - Winners: (Sweden) Niklas Mattsson (m) / (United States) Jamie Anderson (f)
- 19 & 20 March: WC #2 in (United States) Aspen
  - Winners: (Norway) Marcus Kleveland (m) / (Austria) Anna Gasser (f)

Big Air

- 7 – 9 January: WC #1 in (Austria) Kreischberg (final)
  - Winners: (Canada) Maxence Parrot (m) / (New Zealand) Zoi Sadowski-Synnott (f)

=== 2020–21 FIS Snowboard Europa Cup ===
Parallel Snowboard

- 16 & 17 January: EC #1 in (Austria) Simonhöhe
  - Men's winners: (Austria) Alexander Payer (No. 1) / (Poland) Michał Nowaczyk (No. 2)
  - Women's winners: (Japan) Tsubaki Miki (No. 1) / (Netherlands) Michelle Dekker (No. 2)
- 23 & 24 January: EC #2 in (Switzerland) Davos
  - Men's winners: (United States) Cody Winters (No. 1) / (Austria) Lukas Mathies (No. 2)
  - Women's winners: (Switzerland) Ladina Jenny (No. 1) / (Austria) Claudia Riegler (No. 2)
- 6 & 7 February: EC #3 in (Switzerland) Lenzerheide
  - Men's winners: (Austria) Dominik Burgstaller (No. 1) / (Slovenia) Črt Ikovic (No. 2)
  - Women's winners: (Ukraine) Annamari Dancha (No. 1) / (Switzerland) Flurina Neva Bätschi (No. 2)
- 27 & 28 February: EC #4 in (Italy) Villnöß
  - Men's winners: (Italy) Gabriel Messner (No. 1) / (Austria) Aron Juritz (No. 2)
  - Women's winners: (Italy) Lucia Dalmasso (No. 1) / (Switzerland) Larissa Gasser (No. 2)
- 13 & 14 March: EC #5 in (Switzerland) Davos
  - Parallel Giant Slalom winners: (Russia) Iaroslav Stepanko (m) / (Switzerland) Ladina Jenny (f)
  - Parallel Slalom are cancelled here.

Slopestyle

- 21 – 23 December 2020: EC #1 in (Switzerland) Corvatsch
  - Winners: (Italy) Emil Zulian (m) / (Australia) Tess Coady (f)
- 28 – 31 January: EC #2 in (Switzerland) Crans-Montana
  - Winners: (Switzerland) Nicolas Huber (m) / (Belgium) Evy Poppe (f)
- 21 & 22 February: EC #3 in (Germany) Götschen
  - Winners: (Germany) Leon Gütl (m) / (Switzerland) Livia Tannò (f)
- 11 March: EC #4 in (Switzerland) Leysin
  - Winners: (Switzerland) Jonas Junker (m) / (United Kingdom) Mia Brookes (f)

Halfpipe

- 28 – 31 January: EC #1 in (Switzerland) Crans-Montana
  - Winners: (Germany) André Höflich (m) / (Canada) Elizabeth Hosking (f)
- 8 March: EC #2 in (Switzerland) Leysin
  - Winners: (Switzerland) Elias Allenspach (m) / (Switzerland) Elena Schütz (f)

Snowboard Cross

- 26 January – 5 February: EC #1 in (France) Isola 2000
  - Men's winners: (France) Merlin Surget (No. 1) / (France) Quentin Sodogas (No. 2) / (Italy) Matteo Menconi (No. 3)
  - Women's winners: (France) Chloé Trespeuch (2 times) / (Switzerland) Muriel Jost (No. 3)
- 12 & 13 February: EC #2 in (Italy) Chiesa in Valmalenco
  - Men's winners: (Austria) Luca Hämmerle (No. 1) / (Austria) Julian Lüftner (No. 2)
  - Women's winners: (France) Margaux Herpin (No. 1) / (Andorra) Maeva Estevez (No. 2)
- 27 & 28 February: EC #3 in (Austria) Reiteralm
  - Men's winners: (United States) Michael Perle (No. 1) / (France) Guillaume Herpin (No. 2)
  - Women's winners: (France) Margaux Herpin (2 times)
- 6 & 7 March: EC #4 in (Austria) Montafon/Gargellen
  - Men's winners: (France) Guillaume Herpin (No. 1) / (Austria) Andreas Kroh (No. 2)
  - Women's winners: (France) Margaux Herpin (No. 1) / (United States) Livia Molodyh (No. 2)
- 12 – 14 March: EC #5 in (Switzerland) Lenk im Simmental
  - Men's winners: (Austria) Sebastian Jud (No. 1) / Second is cancelled
  - Women's winners: (Canada) Audrey McManiman (No. 1) / Second is cancelled

Big Air

- 8 & 9 February: EC #1 in (Serbia) Kopaonik
  - Winners: (Switzerland) Nicolas Huber (m) / (Spain) Maria Hidalgo (f)
- 19 February: EC #2 in (Switzerland) Davos
  - Winners: (Switzerland) Moritz Boll (m) / (United Kingdom) Mia Brookes (f)
- 21 & 22 February: EC #3 in (Germany) Götschen
  - Winners: (United Kingdom) Gabriel Adams (m) / (Switzerland) Ariane Burri (f)
- 27 February: EC #4 in (Russia) Moscow
  - Winners: (Switzerland) Nicolas Huber (m) / (Russia) Varvara Romanova (f)
- 5 & 6 March: EC #5 in (Germany) Götschen
  - Men's winners: (Slovenia) Ožbe Kuhar (No. 1) / (Germany) Niklas Huber (No. 2)
  - Women's winners: (Finland) Eveliina Taka (No. 1) / (United Kingdom) Amber Fennell (No. 2)

== Softball ==
- 2021 U-23 Men's Softball World Cup
- 2021 WBSC U-12 Softball World Cup
- 2021 WBSC U-18 Women's Softball World Cup
- 2021 WBSC U-15 Women's Softball World Cup

=== 2021 Little League Baseball World Series ===
- Men
- Women

=== 2021 Junior League Baseball World Series ===
- Women

=== 2021 Senior League Baseball World Series ===
- Men
- Women

== Speed Skating ==
- 16 – 17 January: 2021 European Speed Skating Championships in (Netherlands) Heerenveen
  - Allround winners: (Netherlands) Patrick Roest (m) / (Netherlands) Antoinette de Jong (f)
  - Sprint winners: (Netherlands) Thomas Krol (m) / (Netherlands) Jutta Leerdam (f)
- 22 – 24 January: 2021 European Short Track Speed Skating Championships in (Poland) Gdańsk
  - 500 m winners: (Russia) Konstantin Ivliev (m) / (Netherlands) Suzanne Schulting (f)
  - 1000 m winners: (Russia) Semion Elistratov (m) / (Netherlands) Suzanne Schulting (f)
  - 1500 m winners: (Russia) Semion Elistratov (m) / (Netherlands) Suzanne Schulting (f)
  - Men's 5000 m Relay winners: Netherlands (Itzhak de Laat, Dylan Hoogerwerf, Sjinkie Knegt, Jens van 't Wout, Friso Emons)
  - Women's 3000 m Relay winners: France (Gwendoline Daudet, Tifany Huot-Marchand, Aurélie Lévêque, Aurélie Monvoisin)
- 11 – 14 February: 2021 World Single Distances Speed Skating Championships in (Netherlands) Heerenveen
- 5 – 7 March: 2021 World Short Track Speed Skating Championships in (Netherlands) Dordrecht

=== 2020–21 ISU Speed Skating World Cup ===
- 22 – 24 January: 2020–21 ISU Speed Skating World Cup – World Cup 1 in Heerenveen
  - 500 m #1 winners: (Netherlands) Dai Dai Ntab (m) / (Netherlands) Femke Kok (f)
  - 500 m #2 winners: (Russia) Artem Arefyev (m) / (Netherlands) Femke Kok (f)
  - 1000 m winners: (Netherlands) Thomas Krol (m) / (United States) Brittany Bowe (f)
  - 1500 m winners: (Netherlands) Thomas Krol (m) / (United States) Brittany Bowe (f)
  - Women's 3000 m winner: (Netherlands) Irene Schouten
  - Men's 5000 m winner: (Netherlands) Patrick Roest
  - Mass Start winners: (Netherlands) Arjan Stroetinga (m) / (Netherlands) Irene Schouten (f)
  - Team Pursuit winners: Netherlands (Sven Kramer, Chris Huizinga, Beau Snellink) (m) / Canada (Ivanie Blondin, Isabelle Weidemann, Valerie Maltais) (f)
- 29 – 31 January: 2020–21 ISU Speed Skating World Cup – World Cup 2 in (Netherlands) Heerenveen
  - 500 m #1 winners: (Russia) Pavel Kulizhnikov (m) / (Netherlands) Femke Kok (f)
  - 500 m #2 winners: (Netherlands) Ronald Mulder (m) / (Netherlands) Femke Kok (f)
  - 1000 m winners: (Netherlands) Kai Verbij (m) / (United States) Brittany Bowe (f)
  - 1500 m winners: (Netherlands) Thomas Krol (m) / (United States) Brittany Bowe (f)
  - Women's 3000 m winner: (Russia) Natalia Voronina
  - Men's 5000 m winner: (Netherlands) Patrick Roest
  - Mass Start winners: (Netherlands) Jorrit Bergsma (m) / (Netherlands) Irene Schouten (f)
  - Team Pursuit winners: Norway (Sverre Lunde Pedersen, Allan Dahl Johansson, Hallgeir Engebråten) (m) / Canada (Ivanie Blondin, Isabelle Weidemann, Valerie Maltais) (f)

== Speed skiing ==
- 18 – 21 March: 2021 Speed Skiing World Championship in (France) Vars
  - Event Cancelled.

=== 2020–21 Speed Skiing World Cup ===
- 22 – 24 January: WC #1 in (France) Gavarnie/Gèdre
  - Event Cancelled.
- 3 & 4 March: WC #2 in (Andorra) Grandvalira/Grau Roig
  - Event Cancelled.
- 9 – 13 March: WC #3 in (Sweden) Idre
  - Speed Skiing #1 winners: (France) Simon Billy (m) / (Sweden) Britta Backlund (f)
  - Speed Skiing #2 winners: (France) Simon Billy (m) / (Italy) Valentina Greggio (f)
  - Speed Skiing #3 winners: (France) Simon Billy (m) / (Sweden) Britta Backlund (f)
- 21 – 24 March: 2021 WC #4 in (France) Vars (final)
  - Event Cancelled.

== Sport climbing ==
- 2021 IFSC Climbing World Youth Championships

== Squash ==
- 2021 World Junior Squash Championships

=== 2020–21 PSA World Tour ===
World Tour Platinum

- 10–17 October 2020: CIB Egyptian Squash Open in (Egypt) Cairo
  - Men's: (Egypt) Ali Farag defeated (Egypt) Tarek Momen, 11–8, 11–3, 11–4.
  - Women's: (Egypt) Nour El Sherbini defeated (Egypt) Nouran Gohar, 11–9, 11–9, 11–6.
- 1–7 November 2020: Qatar Classic in Doha
  - Men's: (Egypt) Ali Farag defeated (New Zealand) Paul Coll, 11–8, 6–11, 11–9, 11–9.

World Tour Gold

- 7 – 12 December 2020: CIB Black Ball Squash Open in (Egypt) Cairo
  - Women's: (England) Sarah-Jane Perry defeated (Egypt) Hania El Hammamy, 4–11, 9–11, 11–9, 12–10, 11–9.
- 13 – 18 December 2020: CIB Black Ball Squash Open in (Egypt) Cairo
  - Men's: (Egypt) Fares Dessouky defeated (Egypt) Ali Farag, 5–11, 8–11, 11–7, 11–8, 11–8.

World Tour Silver

- 16–22 September 2020: Manchester Open in (England) Manchester
  - Men's: (Egypt) Mohamed El Shorbagy defeated (Egypt) Karim Abdel Gawad, 9–11, 11–8, 11–7, 13–11.
  - Women's: (Egypt) Nour El Tayeb defeated (France) Camille Serme, 3–11, 11–8, 11–7, 11–3.

== Surfing ==
- 2021 World Junior Surfing Championships

== Synchronized skating ==
- 2021 ISU World Junior Synchronized Skating Championships

== Table tennis ==
- TBD: 2021 World Table Tennis Championships
- TBD: 2021 World Team Table Tennis Championships
- 2021 World Junior Table Tennis Championships

== Taekwondo ==
- TBD: 2021 World Taekwondo Championships in Wuxi, China

== Telemark skiing ==
- 15 – 21 March: 2021 World Telemarking Championships and 2021 FIS Telemark Junior World Championships in (Germany) Melchsee-Frutt
  - Senior Sprint winners: (Switzerland) Bastien Dayer (m) / (Switzerland) Amélie Wenger-Reymond (f)
  - Junior Sprint winners: (France) Alexis Page (m) / (Norway) Kaja Bjørnstad Konow (f)
  - Senior Parallel Sprint winners: (Norway) Trym Nygaard Løken (m) / (Switzerland) Amélie Wenger-Reymond (f)
  - Junior Parallel Sprint winners: (Italy) Giacomo Bormolini (m) / (Norway) Kaja Bjørnstad Konow (f)
  - Senior Parallel Sprint Team winners: Switzerland
  - Junior Parallel Sprint Team winners: France
  - Senior Classic winners: (Switzerland) Bastien Dayer (m) / (Switzerland) Amélie Wenger-Reymond (f)
  - Junior Classic winners: (France) Charly Petex (m) / (Norway) Kaja Bjørnstad Konow (f)

=== 2021 Telemark Skiing World Cup ===
- 21 – 25 January: WC #1 in (Germany) Bad Hindelang/Oberjoch
  - Men's Sprint winners: (Slovenia) Jure Aleš (No. 1) / (Switzerland) Nicolas Michel (No. 2)
  - Women's Sprint winner: (Switzerland) Amélie Wenger-Reymond (2 times)
  - Men's Parallel Sprint winners: (Switzerland) Bastien Dayer (No. 1) / (Norway) Trym Nygaard Løken (No. 2)
  - Women's Parallel Sprint winners: (Switzerland) Beatrice Zimmermann (No. 1) / (Switzerland) Amélie Wenger-Reymond (No. 2)
  - Men's Classic winners: (France) Noé Claye (No. 1) / (Switzerland) Nicolas Michel (No. 2)
  - Women's Classic winner: (Switzerland) Amélie Wenger-Reymond (2 times)
- 28 – 31 January: WC #2 in (Slovenia) Krvavec
  - Event Cancelled.
- 10 – 13 February: WC #3 in (France) Passy Plaine-Joux
  - Men's Sprint winners: (Switzerland) Nicolas Michel (No. 1) / (Switzerland) Bastien Dayer (No. 2)
  - Women's Sprint winner: (Switzerland) Amélie Wenger-Reymond (2 times)
  - Men's Classic winners: (Switzerland) Bastien Dayer (2 times)
  - Women's Classic winner: (Switzerland) Amélie Wenger-Reymond (2 times)
- 8 & 9 March: WC #4 in (France) Saint-Gervais-les-Bains
  - Event Cancelled.
- 10 – 15 March: WC #5 in (Switzerland) Thyon/4 Vallèes
  - Men's Sprint winner: (Switzerland) Bastien Dayer
  - Women's Sprint winner: (Switzerland) Amélie Wenger-Reymond
  - Men's Classic winner: (Norway) Trym Nygaard Løken
  - Women's Classic winner: (Switzerland) Amélie Wenger-Reymond

== Tennis ==
=== Grand Slam ===
- 8 – 21 February: 2021 Australian Open in (Australia) Melbourne
  - Men's Singles: (Serbia) Novak Djokovic defeated (Russia) Daniil Medvedev, 7–5, 6–2, 6–2.
  - Women's Singles: (Japan) Naomi Osaka defeated (United States) Jennifer Brady, 6–4, 6–3.
  - Men's Doubles: (Croatia) Ivan Dodig & (Slovakia) Filip Polášek defeated (United States) Rajeev Ram & (United Kingdom) Joe Salisbury, 6–3, 6–4.
  - Women's Doubles: (Belgium) Elise Mertens & (Belarus) Aryna Sabalenka defeated (Czech Republic) Barbora Krejčíková & (Czech Republic) Kateřina Siniaková, 6–2, 6–3.
  - Mixed Doubles: (Czech Republic) Barbora Krejčíková & (United States) Rajeev Ram defeated (Australia) Samantha Stosur & (Australia) Matthew Ebden, 6–1, 6–4.
- 30 May – 12 June: 2021 French Open
- 28 June – 11 July: 2021 Wimbledon Championships
- 30 August – 12 September: 2021 U.S. Open

=== 2021 ATP Tour ===
ATP Tour 250

- 7 – 13 January: 2021 Delray Beach Open in (United States) Delray Beach
  - Singles: (Poland) Hubert Hurkacz defeated (United States) Sebastian Korda, 6–3, 6–3.
  - Doubles: (Uruguay) Ariel Behar & (Ecuador) Gonzalo Escobar defeated (United States) Christian Harrison & (United States) Ryan Harrison, 6–7^{(5–7)}, 7–6^{(7–4)}, [10–4].
- 7 – 13 January: 2021 Antalya Open in (Turkey) Antalya
  - Singles: (Australia) Alex De Minaur defeated (Kazakhstan) Alexander Bublik, 2–0, ret.
  - Doubles: (Croatia) Nikola Mektić & (Croatia) Mate Pavić defeated (Croatia) Ivan Dodig & (Slovakia) Filip Polášek, 6–2, 6–4.
- 1 – 7 February: 2021 Great Ocean Road Open in (Australia) Melbourne
  - Singles: (Italy) Jannik Sinner defeated (Italy) Stefano Travaglia, 7–6^{(7–4)}, 6–4.
  - Doubles: (United Kingdom) Jamie Murray & (Brazil) Bruno Soares defeated (Colombia) Juan Sebastián Cabal & (Colombia) Robert Farah, 6–3, 7–6^{(9–7)}.
- 1 – 7 February: 2021 Murray River Open in (Australia) Melbourne
  - Singles: (United Kingdom) Dan Evans defeated (Canada) Félix Auger-Aliassime, 6–2, 6–3.
  - Doubles: (Croatia) Nikola Mektić & (Croatia) Mate Pavić defeated (France) Jérémy Chardy & (France) Fabrice Martin, 7–6^{(7–2)}, 6–3.

Teams

- 2 – 7 February: 2021 ATP Cup in (Australia) Melbourne
  - In the final, Russia defeated Italy, 2–0, to win their first ATP Cup.

=== 2021 WTA Tour ===
WTA 500

- 6 – 13 January: 2021 Abu Dhabi Women's Tennis Open in (United Arab Emirates) Abu Dhabi
  - Singles: (Belarus) Aryna Sabalenka defeated (Russia) Veronika Kudermetova, 6–2, 6–2.
  - Doubles: (Japan) Shuko Aoyama & (Japan) Ena Shibahara defeated (United States) Hayley Carter & (Brazil) Luisa Stefani, 7–6^{(7–5)}, 6–4.
- 31 January – 7 February: 2021 Yarra Valley Classic in (Australia) Melbourne
  - Singles: (Australia) Ashleigh Barty defeated (Spain) Garbiñe Muguruza, 7–6^{(7–3)}, 6–4.
  - Doubles: (Japan) Shuko Aoyama & (Japan) Ena Shibahara defeated (Russia) Anna Kalinskaya & (Slovakia) Viktória Kužmová, 6–3, 6–4.
- 31 January – 7 February: 2021 Gippsland Trophy in (Australia) Melbourne
  - Singles: (Belgium) Elise Mertens defeated (Estonia) Kaia Kanepi, 6–4, 6–1.
  - Doubles: (Czech Republic) Barbora Krejčíková & (Czech Republic) Kateřina Siniaková defeated (Chinese Taipei) Chan Hao-ching & (Chinese Taipei) Latisha Chan, 6–3, 7–6^{(7–4)}.
- 3 – 7 February: 2021 Grampians Trophy in (Australia) Melbourne
  - Singles: (Estonia) Anett Kontaveit vs (United States) Ann Li, The final was abandoned due to a delay in schedule.
  - Doubles: Not was.

WTA 250

- 13 – 19 February: 2021 Phillip Island Trophy in (Australia) Melbourne
  - Singles: (Russia) Daria Kasatkina defeated (Czech Republic) Marie Bouzková, 4–6, 6–2, 6–2.
  - Doubles: (India) Ankita Raina & (Russia) Kamilla Rakhimova defeated (Russia) Anna Blinkova & (Russia) Anastasia Potapova, 2–6, 6–4, [10–7].

== Volleyball ==
- 23 September – 3 October: 2021 FIVB Volleyball Men's U21 World Championship
- 24 August – 2 September: 2021 FIVB Volleyball Boys' U19 World Championship
- 9–18 July 2021: 2021 FIVB Volleyball Women's U20 World Championship Italy defeated Serbia 3–0 to win their 2nd title.
- 20–29 September 2021: 2021 FIVB Volleyball Girls' U18 World Championship

=== AVC ===
- 29 August 29 – 5 September: 2021 Asian Women's Volleyball Championship
- 12–19 September: 2021 Asian Men's Volleyball Championship

=== CAVB ===
- 18 – 26 February: 2020 African Volleyball Championship U21 in Cairo
  - Group Stage Format: 1st. Egypt, 2nd. Cameroon, 3rd. Morocco, 4th. DR Congo
  - Egypt qualified at the 2021 FIVB Volleyball Men's U21 World Championship.
- 1 – 9 March: Girls' Africa Volleyball Championship U18 and African Volleyball Championship U19 in (Nigeria) Abuja

=== CEV ===
- 22 September 2020 – 1 May: 2020–21 CEV Champions League
- 24 November 2020 – 1 May: 2020–21 CEV Women's Champions League
- 8 October 2020 – 24 March: 2020–21 CEV Challenge Cup
- 10 November 2020 – TBD 2020–21 CEV Women's Challenge Cup
- 10 November 2020 – 23 March: 2020–21 Men's CEV Cup
- 10 November 2020 – TBD: 2020–21 Women's CEV Cup

Regional leagues

- 27 September 2020 – TBD: 2020–21 MEVZA League
- 26 September 2020 – 27 February: 2020–21 Baltic Men Volleyball League

== Water Polo ==
- 2021 FINA World Men's Youth Water Polo Championships
- 12 November 2019 – 1 July: 2020 FINA Men's Water Polo World League Montenegro defeated United States 9–8 to won their 3rd title.
- 12 November 2019 – 19 June: 2020 FINA Women's Water Polo World League United States defeated Hungary 14–8 to won their 14th title.

=== LEN ===
- 11 November 2020 – 5 Jun: 2020–21 LEN Champions League (final 8 in (Germany) Hannover) (Italy) Pro Recco defeated (Hungary) FTC Telekom 9–6 to win their 9th title.
- 13 November 2020 – 8 May: 2020–21 LEN Euro Cup Szolnok won their first title.

== Weightlifting ==
- 2 – 7 April: 2021 African Weightlifting Championships in (Madagascar) Antananarivo
- 3 – 11 April: 2021 European Weightlifting Championships in (Russia) Moscow
- 16 – 25 April: 2020 Asian Weightlifting Championships in (Uzbekistan) Tashkent
- 18 – 25 April: 2020 Pan American Weightlifting Championships in (Dominican Republic) Santo Domingo
- 30 April – 2 May: 7th European Union Cup in (Malta) Cottonera
- 23 – 31 May: 2021 IWF Junior World Weightlifting Championships in (Saudi Arabia) Jeddah
- 7 – 17 December: 2021 World Weightlifting Championships in (Uzbekistan) Tashkent

== Wrestling ==
=== 2021 Wrestling Continental Championships ===
- Wrestling at the 2020 Summer Olympics in (Japan) Tokyo ⇒ 1–7 August
- 2021 World Wrestling Championships in (Norway) Oslo ⇒ 2–10 October
- 2021 European Wrestling Championships in (Poland) Warsaw ⇒ 19–25 April
- 2021 Asian Wrestling Championships in (Kazakhstan) Almaty ⇒ 13–18 April
- 2021 Pan American Wrestling Championships in Guatemala City ⇒ 27–30 May
- 2021 World Wrestling Olympic Qualification Tournament in (Bulgaria) Sofia ⇒ 6–9 May
- 2021 European Wrestling Olympic Qualification Tournament in (Hungary) Budapest ⇒ 18–21 March
- 2021 Asian Wrestling Olympic Qualification Tournament in (Kazakhstan) Almaty ⇒ 9–11 April
- 2021 African & Oceania Wrestling Olympic Qualification Tournament in (Tunisia) Hammamet ⇒ 2–4 April
- 2021 U23 World Wrestling Championships in (Serbia) Belgrade ⇒ 1–7 November
- 2021 European U23 Wrestling Championship in (North Macedonia) Skopje ⇒ 17–23 May
- 2021 World Junior Wrestling Championships in (Russia) Ufa ⇒ 16–22 August
- 2021 European Juniors Wrestling Championships in (Germany) Dortmund ⇒ 28 June–4 July
- Wrestling at the 2021 Junior Pan American Games in (Colombia) Cali ⇒ 1–4 December
- 2021 World Cadet Wrestling Championships in (Hungary) Budapest ⇒ 19–25 July
- 2021 European Cadets Wrestling Championships in (Bulgaria) Samokov ⇒ 14–20 June
- 2021 Veterans World Wrestling Championships in (Greece) Loutraki ⇒ 19–24 October

=== 2021 Wrestling International tournament ===
- 2021 Yasar Dogu Tournament in (Turkey) Istanbul ⇒ 25–27 June
- 2021 Vehbi Emre & Hamit Kaplan Tournament in (Turkey) Istanbul ⇒ 18–20 June
- 2021 Dan Kolov & Nikola Petrov Tournament in (Bulgaria) Plovdiv ⇒ 8–11 April
- Golden Grand Prix Ivan Yarygin 2021 in (Russia) Krasnoyarsk ⇒ 27–30 May
- 2021 Grand Prix Zagreb Open in (Croatia) Zagreb ⇒ 16–17 January
- Grand Prix de France Henri Deglane 2021 in Nice ⇒ 15–17 January
- 2021 Poland Open in Warsaw ⇒ 8–13 June
- Matteo Pellicone Ranking Series 2021 in (Italy) Rome ⇒ 4–7 March

== Wushu ==
- 2023: 2023 World Wushu Championships in (United States) Dallas
- TBD: 8th World Junior Wushu Championships in Morocco
- TBD: 4th World Taijiquan Championships in (Italy) Catania
