= Luge at the 2010 Winter Olympics – Men's singles =

Men's singles at the XXI Olympic Winter Games
- Pictogram for luge
- Venue: Whistler Sliding Centre
- Dates: 13–14 February 2010
- Competitors: 38 from 22 nations
- Winning time: 3:13.085

Medalists
1st place, gold medalist(s)		Felix Loch	Germany
2nd place, silver medalist(s)		David Möller	Germany
3rd place, bronze medalist(s)		Armin Zoeggeler	Italy

The men's luge at the 2010 Winter Olympics took place on 13–14 February 2010 at the Whistler Sliding Centre in Whistler, British Columbia. Germany's Felix Loch was the two-time defending world champion and won the gold medal with the fastest time in each of the four runs. The test event that took place at the venue was won by Germany's David Möller, who would win the silver medal in this event. Italy's Armin Zöggeler was the two-time defending Olympic champion and won a bronze medal in this event. The last World Cup event prior to the 2010 games took place in Cesana, Italy on 30 January 2010 and was won by Zöggeler, who also won the overall World Cup title.

As a consequence of the training accident that killed Nodar Kumaritashvili on 12 February 2010 officials moved the start of the men's singles competition to the women's/doubles start to reduce the speed of the racers. This change was met with mixed reviews, with some participants saying that the change made them feel safer, while others complained that it gave an advantage to stronger starters.

== Logistics ==
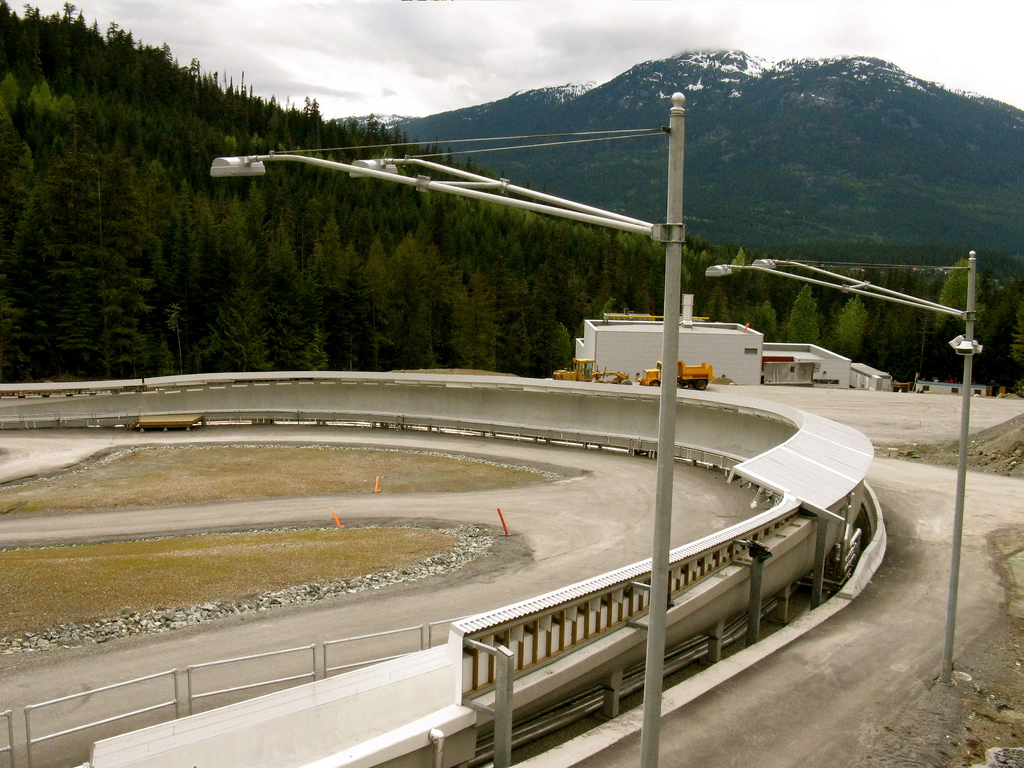
The Whistler Sliding Centre in June, 2008

=== Track ===
Men's singles luge at the 2010 Olympic Games in Vancouver, Canada was held at the Whistler Sliding Centre in Whistler, British Columbia. The track was constructed between 2005 and 2008, and became the 15th competition-level track in the world. It was certified for competition in sliding sports by the International Luge Federation (FIL) and the International Bobsleigh and Tobogganing Federation (FIBT) in March 2008 in a process called homologation where hundreds of athletes ran the track. This was the first time many competitors at the 2010 Games were able to try the track and begin to develop strategies for it. Canadian athletes hoped that having it open two years before the Games, and having that amount of time to train on it, would give them an advantage in the Games. The Whistler Sliding Centre quickly gained a reputation as among the fastest tracks in the world.

=== Rules and description of competition ===
Rules for Olympic luge competitions are set by the International Luge Federation (FIL) and the International Olympic Committee (IOC). They entrust 5 officials with making decisions about whether competition rules have been followed: a technical delegate, three jury members from different countries, and an international judge. These decisions are implemented and enforced by a race director, to whom the overall responsibility for running the competition is given, but who is assisted by a start leader who coordinates the starting area, a finish leader who coordinates the finish area, and a Chief of Track who is in charge of track maintenance. Under the rules, competitors were guaranteed a minimum of five official training runs in the days prior to the competition. The competition itself consists of four runs. Athletes begin their runs on their sleds at a starting block, use their hands to push themselves off in the starting area, and then on their backs on the sleds through the remainder of the course. Athletes are ranked by the speed of their times measured between their start and the finish line at the bottom of the track.

== Preview ==
In a 2 February 2010 interview with the International Luge Federation, Italy's Zöggeler predicted that Russia's Albert Demtschenko, the defending Olympic silver medalist and the European champion, would win the event, with the other medalists being Germany's Loch and Möller. In the final results, Zöggeler edged out Demtschenko for third place.

== Records ==
While the IOC does not consider luge times eligible for Olympic records, the International Luge Federation (FIL) does maintain records for both the start and a complete run at each track it competes.

These records were set during the test event from the men's start house for the 2010 Games on 21 February 2009.

Type	Date	Athlete	Time
Start	21 February 2009	Andi Langenhan (GER)	3.541
Track	21 February 2009	Felix Loch (GER)	46.808

== Death of Nodar Kumaritashvili ==
During training on 12 February 2010, Georgian luger, Nodar Kumaritashvili was going at over 143 km/h (89 mph) when he crashed in the last turn and hit a steel pole. He was administered CPR at the track, then taken away to hospital where he was later pronounced dead. Training was immediately stopped. As a result, the start of the men's single competition was moved to the women's/doubles' start to reduce speed and the wall at corner where Kumaritashvili crashed was raised.

Investigations conducted the same day concluded that the accident was not caused by deficiencies in the track. As a preventative measure, the walls at the exit of curve 16 were to be raised and a change in the ice profile would be made. A joint statement was issued by the FIL, the International Olympic Committee, and the Vancouver Organizing Committee over Kurmaitasvili's death with training suspended for the rest of that day. According to the Coroners Service of British Columbia and the Royal Canadian Mounted Police, the cause was to Kumaritashvili coming out of turn 15 late and not compensating for turn 16. Because of this fatality, an extra 40 yd (37 m) of wall was added after the end of Turn 16 and the ice profile was changed. It also moved the men's singles luge event from its starthouse to the one for both the women's singles and men's doubles event. Kumaritashvili is the first Olympic athlete to die at the Winter Olympics in training since the death of Nicolas Bochatay during a speed skiing practice at the 1992 Winter Olympics and the first luger to die in a practice event at the Winter Olympics since Kazimierz Kay-Skrzypeski of Great Britain was killed at the luge track used for the 1964 Winter Olympics in Innsbruck. It was also luge's first fatality (on an artificial track) since 10 December 1975, when an Italian luger was killed. Kumaritavili's teammate Levan Gureshidze withdrew prior to the first run of the event.

The women's singles and men's doubles start was moved to the Junior start house of the track, located after turn 5. Germany's Natalie Geisenberger complained that it was not a women's start but more of a kinder ("child" in German) start. Her teammate Tatjana Hüfner who had the fastest speed on two runs of 82.3 mph (132.4 km/h) stated that the new start position "..does not help good starters like myself". American Erin Hamlin stated the track was still demanding even after the distance was lessened from 1,193 to 953 m (3,914 to 3,127 ft) and that athletes were still hitting 80 mph (130 km/h).

Despite the changes, and celebrations by the victorious athletes, Kumaritashvili's death overshadowed the race. Some athletes who participated in the competition said they were scared during their runs, and welcomed the track changes. Others criticized the changes as having given an advantage to stronger starters like the German participants, as opposed to weaker starters who would have benefited from having a longer course. Argentina's Ruben Gonzalez said, "God blessed the Germans today."

On 23 March 2010, FIL President Fendt, VANOC President John Furlong, 2010 men's singles gold medalist Felix Loch of Germany visited Kumaritashvili's grave in his hometown of Bakuriani to pay respects as part of tradition in the Georgian Orthodox Church.

The FIL published their reports in regards to Kumaritashvili's death on 12 April 2010 following the FIL Commissions Meeting in St. Leonhard, in Graz, Austria, for both sport and technical commissions on 9–11 April 2010. This report was prepared by Romstad and Claire DelNegro, Vice-President Sport Artificial Track, who is from the United States.

== Qualifying athletes ==
Forty athletes qualified for the men's singles event as of 4 February 2010.

- Tony Benshoof (USA)
- Jeff Christie (CAN)
- Ian Cockerline (CAN)
- Valentin Cretu (ROU)
- Albert Demtschenko (RUS)
- Samuel Edney (CAN)
- Stepan Fedorov (RUS)
- Thomas Girod (FRA)
- Rubén González (ARG)
- Levan Gureshidze (GEO) (withdrew)
- Stefan Höhener (SUI)
- Jakub Hyman (CZE)
- Ondřej Hyman (CZE)
- Peter Iliev (BUL)
- Shiva Keshavan (IND)
- Wolfgang Kindl (AUT)
- Inars Kivlenieks (LAT)
- Viktor Kneib (RUS)
- Nodar Kumaritashvili (GEO) (died during training)
- Maciej Kurowski (POL)
- Andi Langenhan (GER)
- Lee Yong (KOR)
- Felix Loch (GER)
- Ma Chih-hung (TPE)
- Bogdan Macovei (MDA)
- David Mair (ITA)
- Chris Mazdzer (USA)
- David Möller (GER)
- Jozef Ninis (SVK)
- Takahisa Oguchi (JPN)
- Ivan Papukchiev (BUL)
- Daniel Pfister (AUT)
- Manuel Pfister (AUT)
- Domen Pociecha (SLO)
- Reinhold Rainer (ITA)
- Guntis Rekis (LAT)
- Adam Rosen (GBR)
- Mārtiņš Rubenis (LAT)
- Bengt Walden (USA)
- Armin Zöggeler (ITA)

== Results ==
The first two runs took place on 13 February 2010 at 17:00 PST and 19:00 PST. On 14 February 2010, the final two runs took place at 13:00 PST and 15:00 PST.

Time listed at top in italics is start time while time below is the track time. SR - Start Record. TR - Track Record. Top finishes in both times are in boldface.

Loch ended Zöggeler's two straight championships with the fastest times in each of the four runs to become the youngest Olympic champion ever in luge. Zöggeler's fifth medal in this event matched that of Georg Hackl, now a coach on the German team, who won three golds and two silvers between 1988 and 2002. The winning margin of victory was the second largest in this event in Winter Olympics history with Paul Hildgartner of Italy's win over Sergey Danilin of the then-Soviet Union at the 1984 Games being larger (0.704 seconds)

Rank	Bib	Athlete	Country	Run 1	Run 2	Run 3	Run 4	Total	Behind
Gold medal	3	Felix Loch	Germany	**7.016**; **48.168**	7.060; **48.402**	**6.983**; **48.344**	7.000; **48.171**	3:13.085	0.000
Silver medal	6	David Möller	Germany	7.043; 48.341	7.055; 48.511	7.016; 48.582	6.999; 48.330	3:13.764	+0.679
Bronze medal	8	Armin Zöggeler	Italy	7.099; 48.473	7.092; 48.529	7.078; 48.914	7.079; 48.459	3:14.375	+1.290
4	10	Albert Demtschenko	Russia	7.178; 48.590	7.144; 48.579	7.098; 48.769	7.085; 48.467	3:14.405	+1.320
5	12	Andi Langenhan	Germany	7.062; 48.629	**7.027**; 48.658	6.995; 48.869	**6.985**; 48.473	3:14.629	+1.544
6	7	Daniel Pfister	Austria	7.111; 48.583	7.118; 48.707	7.087; 48.883	7.076; 48.553	3:14.726	+1.641
7	17	Samuel Edney	Canada	7.171; 48.754	7.088; 48.793	7.047; 48.920	7.031; 48.373	3:14.840	+1.755
8	5	Tony Benshoof	United States	7.143; 48.657	7.146; 48.747	7.107; 49.010	7.031; 48.714	3:15.128	+2.043
9	9	Wolfgang Kindl	Austria	7.150; 48.707	7.151; 48.755	7.124; 49.080	7.099; 48.553	3:15.525	+2.130
10	21	Manuel Pfister	Austria	7.184; 48.677	7.194; 48.835	7.159; 49.064	7.122; 48.693	3:15.269	+2.184
11	20	Mārtiņš Rubenis	Latvia	7.194; 48.818	7.172; 48.831	7.145; 49.210	7.133; 48.809	3:15.668	+2.583
12	15	Viktor Kneib	Russia	7.170; 48.899	7.139; 48.862	7.097; 49.224	7.085; 48.747	3:15.272	+2.647
13	1	Chris Mazdzer	United States	7.128; 48.811	7.161; 48.963	7.112; 49.223	7.078; 48.816	3:15.813	+2.726
14	19	Jeff Christie	Canada	7.128; 48.881	7.155; 48.904	7.109; 49.308	7.088; 48.730	3:15.623	+2.738
15	13	Bengt Walden	United States	7.164; 49.002	7.137; 48.865	7.118; 49.323	7.125; 48.794	3:15.984	+2.899
16	22	Adam Rosen	Great Britain	7.191; 48.896	7.214; 49.005	7.229; 49.259	7.133; 48.856	3:16.016	+2.931
17	11	David Mair	Italy	7.148; 48.978	7.150; 48.989	7.105; 49.367	7.119; 48.845	3:16.199	+3.114
18	35	Inars Kivlenieks	Latvia	7.148; 48.960	7.150; 49.065	7.113; 49.259	7.062; 48.920	3:16.204	+3.114
19	18	Stepan Fedorov	Russia	7.233; 49.214	7.138; 48.859	7.091; 49.123	7.098; 49.021	3:16.217	+3.312
20	24	Ian Cockerline	Canada	7.180; 49.033	7.185; 49.132	7.135; 49.297	7.100; 48.871	3:16.243	+3.158
21	4	Reinhold Rainer	Italy	7.260; 48.846	7.306; 49.065	7.256; 49.416	7.256; 49.007	3:16.334	+3.349
22	23	Thomas Girod	France	7.186; 49.077	7.210; 49.192	7.150; 49.294	7.136; 49.157	3:16.850	+3.765
23	30	Maciej Kurowski	Poland	7.349; 49.427	7.182; 49.200	7.173; 49.361	7.162; 49.039	3:17.027	+3.942
24	14	Jozef Ninis	Slovakia	7.233; 49.196	7.210; 49.153	7.165; 49.643	7.156; 49.039	3:17.414	+4.029
25	33	Ondřej Hyman	Czech Republic	7.152; 49.284	7.128; 49.346	7.103; 49.512	7.092; 49.247	3:17.389	+4.304
26	36	Guntis Rekis	Latvia	7.222; 49.275	7.195; 49.625	7.146; 49.476	7.171; 49.071	3:17.447	+4.362
27	29	Domen Pociecha	Slovenia	7.299; 49.340	7.291; 49.457	7.286; 49.587	7.262; 49.362	3:17.746	+4.661
28	27	Jakub Hyman	Czech Republic	7.226; 49.379	7.235; 49.726	7.202; 49.465	7.186; 49.231	3:17.801	+4.716
29	37	Shiva Keshavan	India	7.303; 49.561	7.311; 49.529	7.265; 49.597	7.253; 49.786	3:18.473	+5.388
30	16	Takahisa Oguchi	Japan	7.366; 49.542	7.287; 49.780	7.269; 49.818	7.254; 49.903	3:19.043	+5.958
31	34	Valentin Cretu	Romania	7.299; 49.726	7.276; 50.224	7.260; 49.931	7.281; 49.594	3:19.475	+6.390
32	2	Stefan Höhener	Switzerland	7.143; 48.728	7.172; 53.838	7.142; 49.559	7.092; 48.713	3:20.838	+7.753
33	32	Bogdan Macovei	Moldova	7.373; 50.425	7.362; 50.175	7.299; 49.931	7.386; 50.331	3:21.354	+8.269
34	31	Ma Chih-hung	Chinese Taipei	7.442; 50.318	7.410; 50.460	7.474; 51.090	7.451; 50.494	3:22.362	+9.277
35	25	Peter Iliev	Bulgaria	7.338; 50.348	7.272; 50.701	7.250; 50.921	7.351; 50.428	3:22.398	+9.313
36	26	Lee Yong	South Korea	7.430; 50.549	7.386; 50.607	7.397; 51.012	7.358; 51.128	3:23.296	+10.211
37	28	Ivan Papukchiev	Bulgaria	7.527; 50.932	7.428; 50.909	7.343; 51.105	7.323; 50.386	3:23.332	+10.247
38	39	Rubén González	Argentina	7.567; 52.540	7.549; 52.155	7.601; 52.298	7.501; 51.312	3:28.305	+15.220
	38	Levan Gureshidze	Georgia					DNS	
