= Speed skiing world records =

Speed skiing world records are the highest speeds reached in the different categories of this sport.

== Organization ==
These records have been registered in the official competitions organized by the different federations which have managed this sport at a mondial level, across the time (ISS, FISV, FIS, ...). Today, all the races are supervised by the International Ski Federation (FIS). Nevertheless, this federation doesn't publish any record.

Speed skiing is performed in two principal categories :

- Speed One (S1), the best class, performed with specific speed skiing equipment
- S2, the second class, performed with standard alpine skiing equipment (also called Production then Speed Downhil (SDH))

Records are existing for theses 2 categories, and also for age sub-categories (Juniors U21 : under 21 years old, ...)

These records have been established on the quickest tracks of each time. In 2022, the quickest active track is Chabrières in Vars (France). Furthermore, one specific race (Speedmasters) is organized every year for permitting skiers to approach these records, at the period where the track is the quicker (end of March).

Otherwise, other speed sports use skis : monoski, snowboard, telemark, skibob, snowscoot. Their Speed records are also established on the same tracks.

== Current records ==
=== Men ===
Discipline	Category	Name	Nation	Speed	Date	Location
Ski	S1	Simon Billy	France	255,500 km/h	March 22, 2023	(France) Vars
Ski	S1 Junior	Ivan Origone	Italy	250,700 km/h	2006	(France) Les Arcs
Ski	S2	Gregory Meichtry	Switzerland	211,020 km/h	2014	(France) Vars
Ski	S2 Junior	Jimmy Montès	France	204,890 km/h	2006	(France) Les Arcs
Ski	Handisport	Michael Milton	Australia	213,650 km/h	2006	(France) Les Arcs
Monoski	—	Xavier Cousseau	France	212,260 km/h	2006	(France) Les Arcs
Snowboard	—	Edmond Plawczyk	France	203,275 km/h	2015	(France) Vars
Telemark	—	Mao Alban	Switzerland	188,482 km/h	2018	(France) Vars
Skibob	—	Romuald Bonvin	Switzerland	204,430 km/h	2006	(France) Les Arcs
Snowscoot	—	Corentin Desbois	France	168,382 km/h	2017	(France) Vars

=== Women ===
Discipline	Category	Name	Nation	Speed	Date	Location
Ski	S1	Valentina Greggio	Italy	248,27 km/h	April 3, 2026	(France) Vars
Ski	S2	Valentina Greggio	Italy	202,576 km/h	2013	(France) Vars
Ski	S2 Junior	Charlotte Bar	France	200,511 km/h	2006	(France) Les Arcs
Monoski	—	Patty Moll	Switzerland	145,000 km/h	2003	(France) Les Arcs

== S1 record history ==
=== Men ===
Order	Name	Nation	Speed	Year	Location
1	Gustav Lantschner	Austria	105,675 km/h	1930	(Switzerland) Saint-Moritz
2	Leo Gasperl	Austria	136,600 km/h	1932	(Switzerland) Saint-Moritz
3	Zeno Colò	Italy	159,292 km/h	1947	(Italy) Cervinia
4	Edoardo Agreiter	Italy	160,714 km/h	1959	(Italy) Sestriere
5	Luigi Di Marco	Italy	163,265 km/h	1960	(Italy) Cervinia
6	Alfred Planger	Italy	168,224 km/h	1963	(Italy) Cervinia
7	Dick Dorworth	United States	171,428 km/h	1963	(Chile) Portillo
7	Charles Bird Vaughan	United States	171,428 km/h	1963	(Chile) Portillo
9	Luigi Di Marco	Italy	174,757 km/h	1964	(Italy) Cervinia
10	Masaru Morishita	Japan	183,392 km/h	1970	(Italy) Cervinia
11	Alessandro Casse	Italy	184,143 km/h	1971	(Italy) Cervinia
—	Alessandro Casse	Italy	184,237 km/h	1973	(Italy) Cervinia
12	Steve McKinney	United States	189,473 km/h	1974	(Italy) Cervinia
13	Pino Meynet	Italy	194,384 km/h	1975	(Italy) Cervinia
14	Tom Simmons	United States	194,489 km/h	1976	(Italy) Cervinia
—	Steve McKinney	United States	195,200 km/h	1977	(Chile) Portillo
—	Steve McKinney	United States	195,975 km/h	1977	(Italy) Cervinia
—	Steve McKinney	United States	200,222 km/h	1978	(Chile) Portillo
—	Steve McKinney	United States	201,230 km/h	1982	(France) Les Arcs
15	Franz Weber	Austria	203,916 km/h	1982	(United States) Silverton
—	Franz Weber	Austria	208,092 km/h	1983	(United States) Silverton
—	Franz Weber	Austria	208,937 km/h	1984	(France) Les Arcs
16	Graham Wilkie	United Kingdom	212,514 km/h	1987	(France) Les Arcs
17	Michael Prufer	France	217,680 km/h	1987	(Chile) Portillo
—	Michael Prufer	Monaco	223,741 km/h	1988	(France) Les Arcs
—	Michael Prufer	France	229,299 km/h	1992	(France) Les Arcs
18	Philippe Goitschel	France	233,610 km/h	1993	(France) Les Arcs
19	Jeffrey Hamilton	United States	241,448 km/h	1995	(France) Vars
20	Philippe Billy	France	243,902 km/h	1997	(France) Vars
21	Harry Egger	Austria	248,105 km/h	1999	(France) Les Arcs
—	Philippe Goitschel	France	250,700 km/h	2002	(France) Les Arcs
22	Simone Origone	Italy	251,397 km/h	2006	(France) Les Arcs
—	Simone Origone	Italy	252,454 km/h	2014	(France) Vars
—	Simone Origone	Italy	252,632 km/h	2015	(France) Vars
23	Ivan Origone	Italy	254,958 km/h	2016	(France) Vars
24	Simon Billy	France	255,500 km/h	2023	(France) Vars

=== Women ===
Order	Name	Nation	Speed	Year	Location
1	Christl Staffner	Austria	143,027 km/h	1964	(Italy) Cervinia
2	Catherine Breyton	France	165,000 km/h	1978	(Chile) Portillo
—	Catherine Breyton	France	169,332 km/h	1980	(United States) Silverton
3	Annie Breyton	France	175,353 km/h	1982	(France) Les Arcs
4	Marti Martin-Kuntz	United States	190,375 km/h	1983	(France) Les Arcs
5	Melissa Dimino	United States	200,780 km/h	1984	(France) Les Arcs
6	Jacqueline Blanc	France	201,005 km/h	1987	(France) Les Arcs
7	Tarja Mulari	Finland	214,413 km/h	1988	(France) Les Arcs
—	Tarja Mulari	Finland	219,245 km/h	1992	(France) Les Arcs
8	Karine Dubouchet Revol	France	225,000 km/h	1995	(France) Vars
—	Karine Dubouchet Revol	France	225,140 km/h	1996	(France) Vars
—	Karine Dubouchet Revol	France	225,766 km/h	1996	(France) Les Arcs
9	Carolyn Curl	United States	231,660 km/h	1997	(France) Vars
—	Karine Dubouchet Revol	France	234,528 km/h	1999	(France) Les Arcs
—	Karine Dubouchet Revol	France	242,260 km/h	2002	(France) Les Arcs
10	Sanna Tidstrand	Sweden	242,590 km/h	2006	(France) Les Arcs
11	Valentina Greggio	Italy	247,083 km/h	2016	(France) Vars
-	Valentina Greggio	Italy	248,27 km/h	2026	(France) Vars

== S1 best performers of all times ==
=== Men ===
Rank	Name	Nation	Speed	Year	Location	Note
1	Simon Billy	France	255,500 km/h	2023	(France) Vars	France record
2	Ivan Origone	Italy	254,958 km/h	2016	(France) Vars	Italy record
3	Simone Origone	Italy	254,05 km/h	2023	(France) Vars	
4	Manuel Kramer	Austria	252,84 km/h	2023	(France) Vars	Austria record
5	Bastien Montès	France	251,397 km/h	2016	(France) Vars	
6	Jonathan Moret	Switzerland	250,80 km/h	2023	(France) Vars	Switzerland record
7	Philippe Goitschel	France	250,700 km/h	2002	(France) Les Arcs	
8	Philippe May	Switzerland	250,000 km/h	2006	(France) Les Arcs	
9	Laurent Sistach	France	249,653 km/h	2002	(France) Les Arcs	
10	Jukka Viitasaari	Finland	248,791 km/h	2006	(France) Les Arcs	Finland record
11	Tawny Wagstaff	New Zealand	248,61 km/h	2023	(France) Vars	New Zealand record
12	Michal Bekes	Slovakia	248,550 km/h	2023	(France) Vars	Slovak record
13	Klaus Schrottshammer	Austria	248,447 km/h	2016	(France) Vars	
14	Radim Palan	Czech Republic	248,220 km/h	2023	(France) Vars	Czech Republic record
15	Harry Egger	Austria	248,105 km/h	1999	(France) Les Arcs	
16	Christian Jansson	Sweden	248,105 km/h	2017	(France) Vars	Sweden record
17	Ross Anderson	United States	247,934 km/h	2006	(France) Les Arcs	United States record
17	Martin Lachaud	France	247,934 km/h	2006	(France) Les Arcs	
19	Nikolay Pimkin	Russia	247,763 km/h	2016	(France) Vars	Russia record
20	Roger Wickman	Sweden	247,253 km/h	2006	(France) Les Arcs	
21	John Hembel	United States	246,238 km/h	2002	(France) Les Arcs	
22	Tor Schultze	Sweden	245,734 km/h	2006	(France) Les Arcs	
23	Marc Poncin	United Kingdom	245,232 km/h	2005	(France) Les Arcs	United Kingdom record
24	Johan Rousseau	France	245,065 km/h	2005	(France) Les Arcs	
25	Chris Wikler	United States	244,898 km/h	2006	(France) Les Arcs	
26	Jedrezj Dobrowolski	Poland	244,233 km/h	2016	(France) Vars	Poland record
27	Philippe Billy	France	243,902 km/h	1997	(France) Vars	
28	Meryn Vunderink	Netherlands	243,902 km/h	2005	(France) Les Arcs	Netherlands record
29	Radek Cermak	Czech Republic	243,572 km/h	2017	(France) Vars	
30	Michel Goumoens	Switzerland	243,408 km/h	2005	(France) Les Arcs	
31	Serge Perroud	France	243,408 km/h	2006	(France) Les Arcs	
32	Jeffrey Hamilton	United States	242,915 km/h	1997	(France) Les Arcs	
33	Martin Hochrainer	Austria	242,751 km/h	2006	(France) Les Arcs	

=== Women ===
Rank	Name	Nation	Speed	Year	Location	Note
1	Valentina Greggio	Italy	248,27 km/h	2026	(France) Vars	Italy record
2	Britta Backlund	Sweden	244,93 km/h	2023	(France) Vars	Sweden record
3	Sanna Tidstrand	Sweden	242,588km/h	2006	(France) Les Arcs	
4	Karine Dubouchet	France	242,261 km/h	2002	(France) Les Arcs	France record
5	Tracie Sachs	United States	238,570 km/h	2006	(France) Les Arcs	United States record
6	Elena Banfo	Italy	238,410 km/h	2006	(France) Les Arcs	
7	Kati Metsapelto	Finland	237,780 km/h	2006	(France) Les Arcs	Finland record
8	Siri Kling Andersson	Sweden	234,83 km/h	2026	(France) Vars	
9	Cléa Martinez	France	234,78 km/h	2023	(France) Vars	
10	Célia Martinez	France	233,010 km/h	2016	(France) Vars	
11	Linda Baginski	Sweden	231,959 km/h	2014	(France) Vars	
12	Carolyn Curl	United States	231,660 km/h	1999	(France) Vars	
13	Jaana Viitasaari	Finland	229,740 km/h	2002	(France) Les Arcs	
14	Liss-Anne Pettersen	Norway	228,715 km/h	2013	(France) Vars	Norway record
15	Hannamiina Tanninen	Finland	227,850 km/h	2006	(France) Les Arcs	
16	Régine Bianco	Switzerland	225,846 km/h	1997	(France) Vars	Switzerland record
17	Ludivine Toche	France	224,29 km/h	2026	(France) Vars	
18	Seraina Murk	Switzerland	222,910 km/h	2016	(France) Vars	
19	Lisa Hovland-Udén	Sweden	220,990 km/h	2019	(France) Vars	
20	Tarja Mulari	Finland	219,250 km/h	1992	(France) Les Arcs	
21	Agnes Abrahamsson	Sweden	218,42 km/h	2025	(France) Vars	
22	Nicole Schmidhofer	Austria	217,786 km/h	2019	(France) Vars	Austria record
23	Mathilda Persson	Sweden	217,49 km/h	2024	(France) Vars	
24	Laurence Leuba	Switzerland	216,606 km/h	1998	(France) Vars	
25	Aleisha Cline	Canada	215,054 km/h	1993	(France) Les Arcs	Canada record
26	Marta Visa Carol	Spain	214,61 km/h	2024	(France) Vars	Spain record
27	Teria Davies	Canada	214,160 km/h	2002	(France) Les Arcs	
28	Mira Saarikettu	Finland	213,904 km/h	1993	(France) Les Arcs	
29	Maëlle Loridon	France	213,822 km/h	2025	(France) Vars	
30	Cornelia Thun Sandström	Sweden	213,32 km/h	2024	(France) Vars	
31	Kaori Yamazaki	Japan	212,640 km/h	2006	(France) Les Arcs	Japan record
32	Jacqueline Blanc	France	211,143 km/h	1988	(France) Les Arcs	
33	Renata Kolarova	Switzerland	210,526 km/h	1993	(France) Les Arcs	
34	Heini Pipponen	Finland	210,160 km/h	2005	(France) Les Arcs	
35	Anna Morin	Sweden	209,790 km/h	1992	(France) Les Arcs	
36	Françoise Béguin	France	209,546 km/h	1992	(France) Les Arcs	
37	Ulla Riimaki	Finland	208,575 km/h	1996	(France) Les Arcs	
