= Luge at the 2006 Winter Olympics – Men's singles =

Men's singles at the XX Olympic Winter Games
- Pictogram for luge
- Venue: Cesana Pariol
- Dates: February 11 – 12, 2006
- Competitors: 36 from 19 nations

Medalists
1st place, gold medalist(s)		Armin Zöggeler	Italy
2nd place, silver medalist(s)		Albert Demtschenko	Russia
3rd place, bronze medalist(s)		Mārtiņš Rubenis	Latvia

The men's luge at the 2006 Winter Olympics began on February 11, and was completed on February 12 at Cesana Pariol.

== Results ==
The men's singles luge event was run over two days, with the first two runs on February 11, and the second two runs on February 12. The total time was the combined time of all four runs.

Place	Athlete	Country	Run 1	Run 2	Run 3	Run 4	Total	Behind
Gold medal	Armin Zöggeler	Italy	51.718	51.414	51.430	51.526	3:26.088	—
Silver medal	Albert Demtschenko	Russia	51.747	51.543	51.396	51.512	3:26.198	+0.110
Bronze medal	Mārtiņš Rubenis	Latvia	51.913	51.497	51.561	51.474	3:26.445	+0.357
4	Tony Benshoof	United States	51.907	51.458	51.674	51.559	3:26.598	+0.510
5	David Möller	Germany	52.085	51.533	51.655	51.655	3:26.711	+0.623
6	Jan Eichhorn	Germany	52.103	51.469	51.656	51.515	3:26.743	+0.655
7	Georg Hackl	Germany	51.856	51.583	51.806	51.674	3:26.919	+0.831
8	Reinhold Rainer	Italy	51.926	51.696	51.647	51.733	3:27.002	+0.914
9	Markus Kleinheinz	Austria	52.140	51.767	51.841	51.839	3:27.587	+1.499
10	Wilfried Huber	Italy	52.095	51.748	51.848	51.984	3:27.675	+1.587
11	Viktor Kneib	Russia	52.050	52.150	51.981	51.884	3:28.065	+1.977
12	Reiner Margreiter	Austria	52.200	51.880	52.234	51.800	3:28.114	+2.026
13	Daniel Pfister	Austria	52.317	52.103	52.058	51.882	3:28.360	+2.272
14	Jeff Christie	Canada	52.382	52.027	52.013	51.939	3:28.361	+2.273
15	Stefan Höhener	Switzerland	52.459	51.989	52.124	52.212	3:28.784	+2.696
16	Adam Rosen	Great Britain	52.610	52.130	52.093	52.150	3:28.983	+2.895
17	Kaspars Dumpis	Latvia	52.432	52.063	52.391	52.402	3:29.288	+3.200
18	Jonathan Myles	United States	52.579	52.267	52.230	52.332	3:29.408	+3.320
19	Samuel Edney	Canada	52.663	52.523	52.360	52.311	3:29.857	+3.769
20	Takahisa Oguchi	Japan	52.795	52.449	52.498	52.366	3:30.108	+4.020
21	Guntis Rekis	Latvia	52.769	52.338	52.307	52.742	3:30.156	+4.068
22	Jozef Ninis	Slovakia	52.769	52.517	52.525	52.386	3:30.197	+4.109
23	Christian Niccum	United States	53.669	52.675	52.306	52.539	3:31.189	+5.101
24	Kiril Serikov	Russia	54.164	52.468	52.473	52.790	3:31.895	+5.807
25	Shiva Keshavan	India	53.729	52.972	52.696	52.540	3:31.937	+5.849
26	Domen Pociecha	Slovenia	53.141	53.073	53.039	53.072	3:32.325	+6.237
27	Jakub Hyman	Czech Republic	53.262	53.667	52.964	52.930	3:32.823	+6.735
28	Ma Chih-Hung	Chinese Taipei	53.939	53.605	53.977	53.620	3:35.141	+9.053
29	Kim Min-Kyu	South Korea	53.748	54.961	53.528	53.344	3:35.581	+9.493
30	Bogdan Macovei	Moldova	55.681	55.101	54.005	53.599	3:38.386	+12.298
31	Peter Iliev	Bulgaria	54.806	55.189	55.761	53.927	3:39.683	+13.595
32	Werner Hoeger	Venezuela	56.754	55.411	56.256	55.169	3:43.590	+17.502
33	Jaroslav Slavik	Slovakia	52.786	52.066	73.877	52.156	3:50.885	+24.797
34	Shigeaki Ushijima	Japan	53.306	89.310	52.414	52.318	4:07.348	+41.260
35	Mark Hatton	Great Britain	52.790	52.720	94.895	52.494	4:12.899	+46.811
—	Ian Cockerline	Canada	52.290	52.107	52.255	DNF	—	—
