= Jeff Hamilton (skier) =

American speed skier (1966–2023)

Personal information
- Born: Jeffrey Alan Hamilton; November 22, 1966 Auburn, California, U.S.
- Died: January 10, 2023 (aged 56) Truckee, California, U.S.

Sport
- Sport: speed skiing
Medal record
Men speed skiing
Representing United States
Winter Olympics
Bronze medal – third place	Albertville	Speed Skiing

Jeffrey Alan Hamilton (November 22, 1966 – January 10, 2023) was an American speed skier.

== Career ==
Hamilton competed at the 1992 Winter Olympics in the speed skiing demonstration event. In this event he finished third behind the French competitors Michael Prufer and Philippe Goitschel. In 1995, Hamilton became the first skier to go faster than 150 miles per hour (240 km/h) and he held the world record between 1995 and 1997. He was a three-time world champion between 1998 and 2000; he also medaled in two other years. He also set a world record for inline speed skating at 65 miles per hour (105 km/h).

== Personal life and death ==
Hamilton attended Placer High School in Auburn. He had a ski shop in Aspen, Colorado.

Hamilton died in Truckee, California, on January 10, 2023, at the age of 56. He died from pancreatic cancer.
