= Olympic and Paralympic deaths =

At the modern Olympic Games, as of the conclusion of the 2024 Summer Paralympics, eight Olympic or Paralympic athletes and nine horses have died as a result of competing in or practicing their sport at Games venues; three other deaths were potentially a result of competition. In addition, another 16 participants have died at the Olympics from other causes; 11 of these deaths were from the Munich massacre.

Several incidents related to the Olympics have caused the death of non-participants. Large numbers were killed during the Lima football riot of 1964 and the Tlatelolco massacre in Mexico City in 1968. The Centennial Olympic Park bombing at the 1996 Atlanta Games killed two people.

== In competition during the Olympics ==
- Francisco Lázaro (24), Portugal — Runner — 1912, Stockholm. Having covered his skin with suet to prevent sunburn and improve performance, the resulting impairment of his perspiration caused a fatal electrolyte imbalance at the 30-km mark.
- Knud Enemark Jensen (23), Denmark — Cyclist — 1960, Rome. Fell unconscious due to heat stroke during a race, then died during treatment in a military tent.

=== Horses ===
- Legény (11) (ridden by István Visy), HUN 1936, Berlin – euthanised after breaking a leg at fence four, The Pond. Legény was one of 3 horses euthanised because of injuries at the obstacle.
- Monaster (6) (ridden by Gustaf Nyblaeus), SWE 1936, Berlin – euthanised after being injured at fence four
- Slippery Slim (8) (ridden by John Willems), USA 1936, Berlin – euthanised after breaking a foreleg at fence four
- Iller (12) (ridden by Johan Asker), SWE 1956, Stockholm – euthanised after breaking a leg on the cross country course
- Mures II (ridden by Andrei Cadar), ROU 1960, Rome – collapsed and died after finishing the cross country course
- Balerina (ridden by Svetozar Glushkov), URS 1968, Mexico City - Suffered a fatal injury on the cross country course
- Loughlin (ridden by Penelope Moreton), IRL, 1968, Mexico City - Suffered a fatal injury on the cross country course
- Over and Over (ridden by Joris Vanspringel), BEL 2004, Athens – suffered a fracture of the left femur during the cross-country portion of the event. The horse was euthanized when veterinarians concluded that the injury could not be repaired.
- Jet Set (14) (ridden by Robin Godel), SUI 2020, Tokyo – euthanised after pulling up extremely lame on the Sea Forest cross-country course

== In competition during the Paralympics ==
- Bahman Golbarnezhad (48), Iran – Cyclist – 2016, Rio de Janeiro – cardiac arrest following crash

== During Olympic practice or potentially from competing ==
- David Bratton (35) and George Van Cleaf (25), United States – Water polo and swimming – 1904, St. Louis. The artificial lake created in the middle of the World’s Fair for the lifesaving exhibition was also used for livestock exhibits. Cattle at these exhibits grazed around and stood in the lake, and the water polo and swimming events were held at the other end of the lake. Within four months of the water polo and swimming events, Bratton and Van Cleaf died from typhoid fever. Each competed in water polo and the 4 x 50 yards freestyle relay.
- Nicolae Berechet (20), Romania – Boxing – 1936, Berlin. Berechet died three days after losing his bout against Evald Seeberg. His death was officially recorded as being due to blood poisoning, but it has been suggested that damage caused in the fight may have been a factor in his death.
- Ignaz Stiefsohn (25), Austria – Gliding (demonstration event) – 1936, Berlin. Stiefsohn was killed on 3 August when his glider broke a wing and crashed during practice.
- Ross Milne (19), Australia – Downhill skiing – 1964, Innsbruck. Milne died in a ski collision with a tree in practice at Innsbruck four days before the opening of the Games.
- Kazimierz Kay-Skrzypecki (58), Britain – Luge – 1964, Innsbruck. Kay-Skrzypecki died one day after a luge crash during practice at Innsbruck, which occurred eight days before the opening of the Games.
- Nicolas Bochatay (27), Switzerland – Speed skiing (demonstration sport) – 1992, Albertville. Bochatay collided with a snow machine on an adjacent public slope outside of competition.
- Nodar Kumaritashvili (21), Georgia – Luge – 2010, Vancouver. Kumaritashvili died in a luge crash in practice on the day of the opening ceremony.

== Other deaths of Olympic participants ==
=== Paris 1900 ===
Edmond Brassart, (30), France – Fencing – 1900, Paris – Brassard was killed alongside three others in the collapse of the Passerelle des Invalides, a temporary bridge built for the Exposition Universelle of 1900. This occurred two months after he participated in the Olympic Games but also two months before the Games concluded.

=== St. Louis 1904 ===
Galen Spencer was admitted to hospital for surgery three weeks after becoming Olympic champion in archery. He died a week later. This was a month before the concluding events of the 1904 Games.

=== London 1948 ===
During the London Olympics, Eliška Misáková, one of nine members of the Czechoslovak women's team in gymnastics, became ill on arrival in the host city. Diagnosed with polio, she died on the last day of the Olympics, the same day her teammates won the competition.

=== Melbourne 1956 ===
Arrigo Menicocci, Italian rower who competed in eights, was killed as a passenger in a car crash about 90 km northwest of Melbourne during the Olympics on 1 December 1956, four days after the end of the rowing competition.

=== Munich 1972 ===
In 1972, during the Munich Olympics, the Palestinian militant organisation Black September killed 11 members of the Israeli team.

The 11 Israeli Olympic Team members who were murdered in the 1972 Olympic Games in Munich are:

- Mark Slavin, 18, wrestler
- Eliezer Halfin, 24, wrestler
- David Mark Berger, 28, weightlifter
- Ze'ev Friedman, 28, weightlifter
- Yossef Romano, 32, weightlifter
- Andre Spitzer, 27, fencing coach
- Moshe Weinberg, 33, wrestling coach
- Yossef Gutfreund, 40, wrestling referee
- Amitzur Shapira, 40, track and field coach
- Yakov Springer, 51, weightlifting judge
- Kehat Shorr, 53, shooting coach

=== Calgary 1988 ===
Between the morning and afternoon runs of the men's giant slalom, Jörg Oberhammer, 47, the Austrian team doctor, was skiing on a recreational slope when he collided with another skier (a CTV technician) and was knocked under a snow-grooming machine, which crushed him instantly.

=== Rio de Janeiro 2016 ===
German Olympic canoe slalom coach and Olympic silver-medalist Stefan Henze, 35, died on 15 August 2016 after his taxi was hit in a high-speed head-on collision in Rio three days earlier.

=== Tokyo 2020 ===
The Chinese coach of the Vietnamese Olympic swim team, Huang Guohui, 57, was suspected to have died by suicide whilst being held under COVID-19 quarantine in Hanoi following the return from Tokyo.

=== Paris 2024 ===
The coach of the Samoan boxing team, Lionel Elika Fatupaito, died on 26 July 2024 in the Olympic Village due to cardiac arrest when he was leaving the Olympic Village to attend the opening ceremony.

== Deaths of non-participants at Olympic-related events ==
=== Lima 1964 ===
In a qualifying match for the Olympic football tournament, home fans began rioting after a late Peru goal was disallowed. Police fired tear gas into the crowd, exacerbating the situation, which ended with at least 328 deaths.

=== Mexico 1968 ===
The Mexico 68 protests were part of a worldwide series of leftwing student-led protests. While the protesting National Strike Council claimed not to link its demands to the Olympics, some students protested at the perceived extravagance of hosting the games, and some sought to exploit the increased foreign media presence in the city for publicity. The authoritarian government had a secret "Olympia Battalion" to ensure security during the Games. Ten days before the games, the unit swept through a mass meeting in the Plaza de las Tres Culturas making arrests. Estimates of the number killed in the operation range from thirty to several hundred.

=== Munich 1972 ===
In addition to the 11 Israeli Olympic Team members who died, West German police officer Anton Fliegerbauer and five Palestinian terrorists were killed during a shootout. Carmel Eliash, cousin of Moshe Weinberg, had a heart attack during the public memorial service the following day.

=== Atlanta 1996 (Olympic Park Bombing) ===
On 27 July 1996 (the eighth day of the 1996 Atlanta Summer Games), a bomb exploded at the Centennial Olympic Park in Atlanta, Georgia. The blast directly killed one person and injured 111 others; another person later died of a heart attack.

=== Sydney 2000 ===
Hyginus Anugo, 22, of Nigeria, a 4 × 400 metres relay reserve, was killed after being struck by a car while crossing a street in Sydney eight days before the Games opened. He did not have Olympic accreditation and was not staying at the Olympic athletes' village. Anugo was with the team training in Adelaide, where final selections for relay squads were made, and was not selected. He had been due to return to Nigeria but had voluntarily proceeded to Sydney.

=== Athens 2004 Paralympics ===
Seven teenagers from Farkadona were killed in a crash while travelling to Athens for the Games, when their bus collided with a truck near the town of Kamena Vourla. Out of respect for their deaths, the cultural portion of the closing ceremonies of these Paralympics was cancelled.

=== Beijing 2008 ===
A Hong Kong Police motorcyclist was on a VIP escort to Sheung Yue River for 2008 Olympic Equestrian events and was killed en route in a traffic collision.

=== London 2012 ===
On 1 August 2012, a special bus carrying media from the London Olympic Park was involved in a collision in which a cyclist was killed.

== See also ==
- List of Olympians killed in World War I
- List of Olympians killed in World War II
