= Sergei Chalibashvili =

Soviet diver

- Sergei Chalibashvili

Personal information
- Native name: Georgian: სერგო შალიბაშვილი; Russian: Шалибашвили Сергей
- Nationality: Soviet Union
- Born: 22 June 1962; Tbilisi, Georgian SSR, Soviet Union
- Died: 16 July 1983 (aged 21); Edmonton, Alberta, Canada

Sport
- Sport: Diving
- Events: Springboard diving; Platform diving

Sergei Chalibashvili (Georgian: სერგო შალიბაშვილი; Russian: Сергей Шалибашвили; 22 June 1962 – 16 July 1983) was a Georgian competitive diver from the Soviet Union. He earned a silver medal at the European Youth Championship in 1978 in Florence, diving from the 10-meter diving platform.

== Death ==
Chalibashvili died at the age of 21 following an accident during competition at the 1983 Summer Universiade in Edmonton, Alberta, when he hit his head on the platform while attempting a reverse 3½ somersault in the tuck position. He fell into a week-long coma and died of heart failure, never having regained consciousness.

Greg Louganis was a participant in the competition and witnessed the incident. He remembered what had happened as follows:

I had a premonition. I closed my eyes and plugged my ears. I knew something terrible had happened when I felt the tower shake. I heard screaming. I ran to the edge of the platform and saw a lot of blood in the pool. I wanted to jump in after him, but people were yelling, 'Don't touch him! Don't touch him!' I couldn't watch anymore.

Bob Rydze, the U.S. diving coach at the Edmonton games, blamed the tragedy on the athlete's coach, saying that Chalibashvili had been having difficulty with the dive all week in practice. In answer to a journalist's question as to why Rydze did not warn Soviet coaches, he replied that he would have appeared to be interfering in the Soviet coaches' business. According to Olympic diving champion Elena Vaytsekhovskaya, Chalibashvili went to the Universiade without a coach. According to reports, Chalibashvili's coach was his mother, Thais Muntean, who worked at the department of water sports at the Georgian State Institute of Physical Education (now dissolved and converted into a chair at the State University). She was absent from the competition. Subsequently, she grieved the loss of her only son and gave praise for the care given to him in an Edmonton hospital.

A few years later a similar dive killed Nathan Meade (1966 – 1987), an Australian athlete in training. Greg Louganis earned a gold medal with the same dive at the 1988 Summer Olympics. At the University of Calgary, there was a memorial scholarship named after Chalibashvili for members of the university's swim team.

Chalibashvili is the only water sports athlete known to have died as a direct result of a mishap during training or competition at an international multi-sport event such as the World University Games, Olympic Games or Commonwealth Games.

== See also ==
- Nodar Kumaritashvili
- Kazimierz Kay-Skrzypeski
- Ross Milne
- Nicolas Bochatay
- Knut Jensen
- Francisco Lázaro
