= Speed skiing at the 1992 Winter Olympics =

Speed skiing was a demonstration sport at the 1992 Winter Olympics. The venue was in Les Arcs, about 60 km from the host city, Albertville. Michael Prufer, a 31-year-old medical doctor from Savoie, improved his own 1988 world record by 5.558 km/h. Philippe Goitschel, the nephew of French ski champion Marielle Goitschel, was second and the American Jeffrey Hamilton was third. The competition was, however, marred by the death of Nicolas Bochatay from Switzerland, who died while free skiing the morning of the finals.

Tarja Mulari from Finland achieved a top speed of 219.245 kilometres per hour (136.233 mph), breaking the previous women's world record of 214.723 km/h (133.423 mph).

== Men's event ==
The competition was held on 20–22 February.

Rank	Athlete	Preliminary	Semifinal	Final
1st place, gold medalist(s)	Michaël Prüfer (FRA)	205.362 km/h (127.606 mph)	217.129 km/h (134.918 mph)	229.299 km/h (142.480 mph) WR
2nd place, silver medalist(s)	Philippe Goitschel (FRA)	203.160 km/h (126.238 mph)	218.978 km/h (136.067 mph)	228.717 km/h (142.118 mph)
3rd place, bronze medalist(s)	Jeff Hamilton (USA)	201.342 km/h (125.108 mph)	211.144 km/h (131.199 mph)	226.700 km/h (140.865 mph)
4	Laurent Sistach (FRA)	202.931 km/h (126.095 mph)	215.440 km/h (133.868 mph)	225.000 km/h (139.809 mph)
5	Claude Basile (FRA)	201.681 km/h (125.319 mph)	208.817 km/h (129.753 mph)	223.464 km/h (138.854 mph)
6	Petr Kakes (TCH)	200.334 km/h (124.482 mph)	209.790 km/h (130.357 mph)	223.325 km/h (138.768 mph)
7	Jim Morgan (USA)	199.667 km/h (124.067 mph)	212.889 km/h (132.283 mph)	222.910 km/h (138.510 mph)
8	Franz Weber (AUT)	203.505 km/h (126.452 mph)	213.777 km/h (132.835 mph)	222.222 km/h (138.082 mph)
9	Silvano Meli (SUI)	202.931 km/h (126.095 mph)	213.650 km/h (132.756 mph)	222.085 km/h (137.997 mph)
10	John Mueller (USA)	201.681 km/h (125.319 mph)	213.650 km/h (132.756 mph)	221.811 km/h (137.827 mph)
11	Tore Nyløkken (NOR)	201.681 km/h (125.319 mph)	210.526 km/h (130.815 mph)	221.402 km/h (137.573 mph)
12	Gerhard Pöttler (AUT)	198.456 km/h (123.315 mph)	208.213 km/h (129.378 mph)	221.266 km/h (137.488 mph)
13	Cristian Anguita (CHI)	195.865 km/h (121.705 mph)	208.213 km/h (129.378 mph)	220.994 km/h (137.319 mph)
14	Graham Wilkie (GBR)	197.911 km/h (122.976 mph)	208.938 km/h (129.828 mph)	217.918 km/h (135.408 mph)
15	Vincent Poscente (CAN)	197.694 km/h (122.841 mph)	212.766 km/h (132.207 mph)	216.737 km/h (134.674 mph)
16	Juhani Laakso (FIN)	197.477 km/h (122.707 mph)	211.020 km/h (131.122 mph)	216.346 km/h (134.431 mph)
17	Dale Womack (USA)	203.275 km/h (126.309 mph)	210.158 km/h (130.586 mph)	213.270 km/h (132.520 mph)
18	Roger Stump (SUI)	201.342 km/h (125.108 mph)	214.925 km/h (133.548 mph)	DNS (Note: Nicolas Bochatay died in a training run before the final, causing Roger Stump and Pierre-Yves Jorand to withdraw.)
19	Pierre-Yves Jorand (SUI)	202.931 km/h (126.095 mph)	214.669 km/h (133.389 mph)	DNS
20	Nicolas Bochatay (SUI)	197.260 km/h (122.572 mph)	210.650 km/h (130.892 mph)	DNS
21	Kazunaga Kusumi (JPN)	201.342 km/h (125.108 mph)	206.540 km/h (128.338 mph)	—
22	Harry Egger (AUT)	205.479 km/h (127.679 mph)	206.304 km/h (128.191 mph)	—
23	Marc Poncin (GBR)	199.778 km/h (124.136 mph)	205.714 km/h (127.825 mph)	—
23	Laurent Marechal (CAN)	195.972 km/h (121.771 mph)	205.714 km/h (127.825 mph)	—
25	Hugh Grierson (NZL)	195.759 km/h (121.639 mph)	205.597 km/h (127.752 mph)	—
26	Kenneth Dale (CAN)	197.152 km/h (122.505 mph)	204.429 km/h (127.026 mph)	—
27	Anders Forsberg (SWE)	199.005 km/h (123.656 mph)	204.197 km/h (126.882 mph)	—
28	Stuart Wilkie (GBR)	201.230 km/h (125.039 mph)	203.046 km/h (126.167 mph)	—
29	Florian Maurer (GER)	195.440 km/h (121.441 mph)	201.794 km/h (125.389 mph)	—
30	Aare Tamme (EST)	196.721 km/h (122.237 mph)	201.455 km/h (125.178 mph)	—
31	Petter Jorman (SWE)	194.805 km/h (121.046 mph)	—	—
32	Christian Zach (GER)	194.280 km/h (120.720 mph)	—	—
33	David Scott (NZL)	193.966 km/h (120.525 mph)	—	—
34	Martín Buschmann (CHI)	193.757 km/h (120.395 mph)	—	—
35	Joaquín Oyarzún (CHI)	193.653 km/h (120.330 mph)	—	—
36	Richard Powell (NZL)	193.237 km/h (120.072 mph)	—	—
37	Falk Hess (GER)	191.898 km/h (119.240 mph)	—	—
38	Claudio Gottardo (ARG)	191.591 km/h (119.049 mph)	—	—
39	Michael Gay (NZL)	191.286 km/h (118.860 mph)	—	—
40	Jean-Daniel Guerin (AUS)	191.184 km/h (118.796 mph)	—	—
41	Andrzej Tobiasz (POL)	188.778 km/h (117.301 mph)	—	—
42	Jonathan Elabor (GBR)	188.679 km/h (117.240 mph)	—	—
43	Robert Empl (GER)	187.110 km/h (116.265 mph)	—	—
44	Eric Hards (CAN)	185.950 km/h (115.544 mph)	—	—
45	Leslie Herstik (AUS)	183.299 km/h (113.897 mph)	—	—

Mohamed Hadid is reported to have taken part representing Jordan, however no result for him was recorded.

== Women's event ==
The competition was held on 20–22 February.

Rank	Athlete	Preliminary	Semifinal	Final
1st place, gold medalist(s)	Tarja Mulari (FIN)	200.222 km/h (124.412 mph)	211.889 km/h (131.662 mph)	219.245 km/h (136.233 mph) WR
2nd place, silver medalist(s)	Liss-Anne Pettersen (NOR)	195.972 km/h (121.771 mph)	202.134 km/h (125.600 mph)	212.892 km/h (132.285 mph)
3rd place, bronze medalist(s)	Renata Kolarova (SUI)	194.384 km/h (120.785 mph)	204.313 km/h (126.954 mph)	210.526 km/h (130.815 mph)
4	Anna Morin (SWE)	194.805 km/h (121.046 mph)	202.247 km/h (125.670 mph)	209.790 km/h (130.357 mph)
5	Melissa Dimino-Simons (USA)	194.280 km/h (120.720 mph)	196.078 km/h (121.837 mph)	203.620 km/h (126.524 mph)
6	Lark Frolek (CAN)	199.115 km/h (123.724 mph)	181.910 km/h (113.034 mph)	—
7	Françoise Beguin (FRA)	195.972 km/h (121.771 mph)	195.440 km/h (121.441 mph)	—
8	Jacqueline Blanc (FRA)	195.334 km/h (121.375 mph)	195.865 km/h (121.705 mph)	—
9	Lisa Powell (NZL)	193.966 km/h (120.525 mph)	—	—
10	Kirsten Culver (USA)	193.548 km/h (120.265 mph)	—	—
11	Pia Ruuskanen (FIN)	193.444 km/h (120.201 mph)	—	—
12	Marie-Noëlle Lappert-Estier (SUI)	193.029 km/h (119.943 mph)	—	—
13	Camilla Hackman-Uski (FIN)	192.719 km/h (119.750 mph)	—	—
14	Amy Guras (USA)	192.616 km/h (119.686 mph)	—	—
15	Valerie Gomez (SUI)	190.779 km/h (118.545 mph)	—	—
16	Sarah Bonfanti (FRA)	189.724 km/h (117.889 mph)	—	—
17	Donnah Corminboeuf (GBR)	188.186 km/h (116.933 mph)	—	—
18	Richelle Reichsfeld (USA)	187.500 km/h (116.507 mph)	—	—
19	Divina Galica (GBR)	182.927 km/h (113.666 mph)	—	—
20	Mary McCann (CAN)	182.094 km/h (113.148 mph)	—	—
