= Bulgaria at the 2010 Winter Olympics =

- IOC code: BUL
- NOC: Bulgarian Olympic Committee
- Website: www.bgolympic.org (in Bulgarian and English)

in Vancouver
- Competitors: 19 in 6 sports
- Flag bearers: Aleksandra Zhekova (opening); Evgenia Radanova (closing)
- Medals: Gold 0 Silver 0 Bronze 0 Total 0

Winter Olympics appearances (overview)
- 1936; 1948; 1952; 1956; 1960; 1964; 1968; 1972; 1976; 1980; 1984; 1988; 1992; 1994; 1998; 2002; 2006; 2010; 2014; 2018; 2022; 2026

Bulgaria participated at the 2010 Winter Olympics in Vancouver, British Columbia, Canada. The Bulgarian team consisted of 19 athletes in 6 sports.

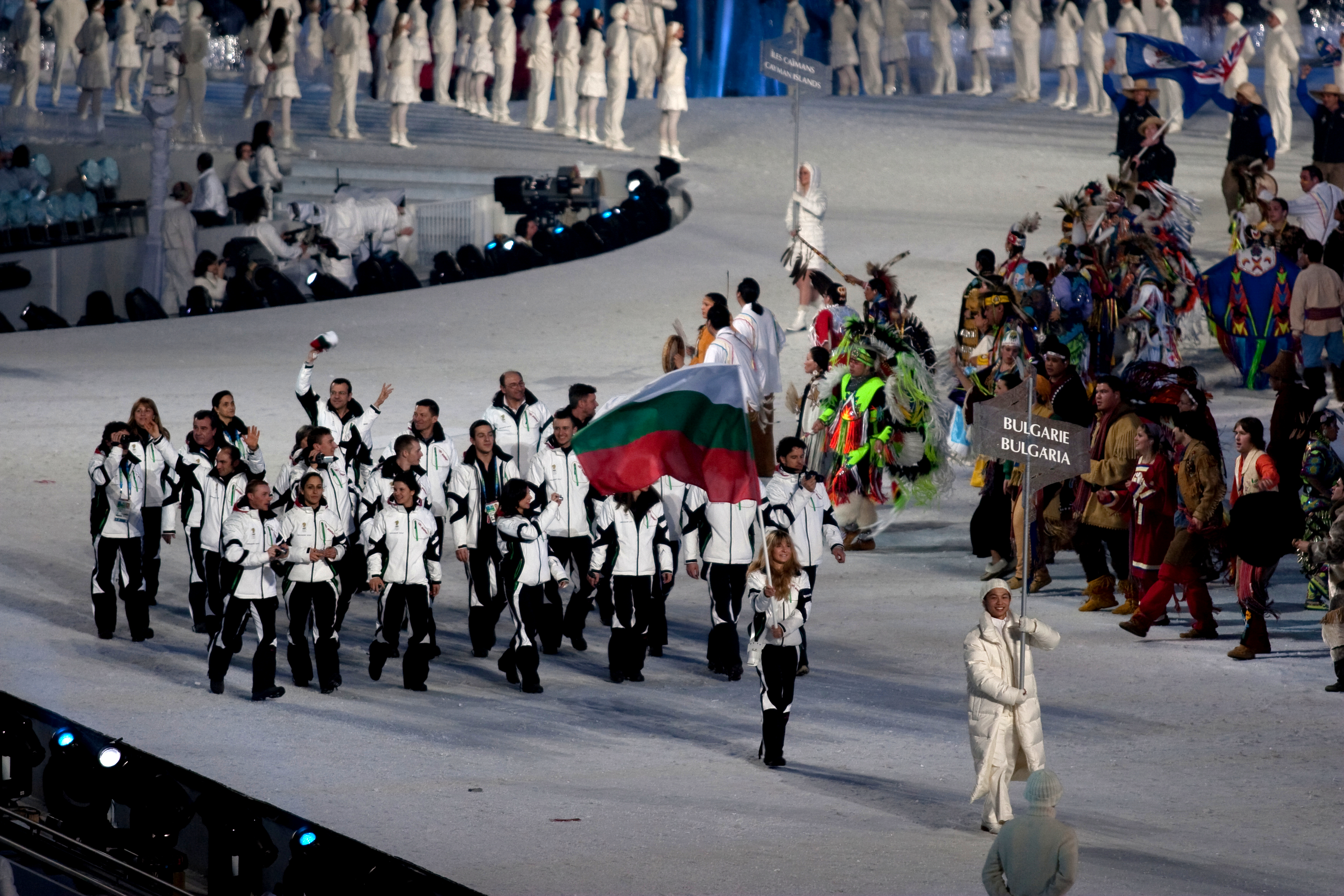
The athletes entering the stadium during the opening ceremonies.

== Alpine skiing ==
Bulgaria qualified three alpine skiers.

Men

Athlete	Event	Run 1	Run 2	Total	Rank
Kilian Albrecht	Men's slalom	50.08	52.28	1:42.36	20
Kilian Albrecht	Men's giant slalom	DNS			
Stefan Georgiev	Men's slalom	50.86	53.06	1:43.92	25
Stefan Georgiev	Men's super-G			1:36.32	41
Stefan Georgiev	Men's downhill			DNF	
Stefan Georgiev	Men's combined	2:02.77	54.64	2:57.41	34
Stefan Georgiev	Men's giant slalom	1:23.82	1:25.09	2:48.91	48

Women

Athlete	Event	Run 1	Run 2	Total	Rank
Maria Kirkova	Women's slalom	DNF			
Maria Kirkova	Women's super-G			DNF	
Maria Kirkova	Women's downhill			1:56.80	33
Maria Kirkova	Women's giant slalom	DNF			

== Biathlon ==
Bulgaria qualified six biathletes (five male and one female).

Men

Athlete	Event			
Athlete	Event	Time	Misses	Rank
Krasimir Anev	Individual	52:09.2	2 (0+2+0+0)	25
Krasimir Anev	Sprint	26:09.1	0 (0+0)	25
Krasimir Anev	Pursuit	37:24.2	3 (2+0+0+1)	45
Martin Bogdanov	Individual	58:29.6	4 (1+2+0+1)	84
Vladimir Iliev	Individual	57:37.8	5 (2+1+1+1)	79
Vladimir Iliev	Sprint	28:45.0	3 (1+2)	83
Miroslav Kenanov	Sprint	28:40.2	1 (1+0)	82
Michail Kletcherov	Individual	54:54.6	3 (1+1+1+0)	63
Michail Kletcherov	Sprint	27:23.1	0 (0+0)	59
Michail Kletcherov	Pursuit	37:08.1	0 (0+0+0+0)	44
Krasimir Anev; Miroslav Kenanov; Michail Kletcherov; Vladimir Iliev	Relay	1:29:39.7	9 (0+9)	15

Women

Athlete	Event			
Athlete	Event	Time	Misses	Rank
Nina Klenovska	Individual	45:49.8	3 (0+1+1+1)	48
Nina Klenovska	Sprint	22:32.4	3 (1+2)	61

== Cross-country skiing ==
Men

Athlete	Event		
Athlete	Event	Time	Rank
Veselin Tsinzov	Men's 15 km freestyle	36:11.7	50
Veselin Tsinzov	Men's 30 km pursuit	DNF	

Women

Athlete	Event		
Athlete	Event	Time	Rank
Teodora Malcheva	Women's 10 km freestyle	29:52.4	66
Antonia Grigorova	Women's 10 km freestyle	28:27.7	60
Antonia Grigorova	Women's 15 km pursuit	49:31.5	62

== Luge ==
Athlete	Event	Run 1		Run 2		Run 3		Run 4		Total	
Athlete	Event	Time	Rank	Time	Rank	Time	Rank	Time	Rank	Time	Rank
Peter Iliev	Men's singles	50.348	34	50.701	35	50.921	34	50.427	35	3:22.398	35
Ivan Papukchiev	Men's singles	50.932	37	50.909	36	51.105	37	50.386	34	3:23.332	37

== Short track speed skating ==
Men

Athlete	Event	Heat		Quarterfinal		Semifinal		Final	
Athlete	Event	Time	Rank	Time	Rank	Time	Rank	Time	Rank
Asen Pandov	Men's 1000 m	1:28.580	4	Did not advance					

Women

Athlete	Event	Heat		Quarterfinal		Semifinal		Final	
Athlete	Event	Time	Rank	Time	Rank	Time	Rank	Time	Rank
Marina Georgieva-Nikolova	Women's 500 m	DSQ	Did not advance						
Marina Georgieva-Nikolova	Women's 1500 m	2:28.732	3 Q			2:25.604	7	Did not advance	
Evgenia Radanova	Women's 500 m	45.125	1 Q	44.047	3	Did not advance			
Evgenia Radanova	Women's 1000 m	1:32.829	4	Did not advance					
Evgenia Radanova	Women's 1500 m	2:23.698	3 Q			2:24.376	2	2:19.411	7

== Snowboarding ==
Parallel GS

Athlete	Event	Qualification		Round of 16	Quarterfinals	Semifinals	Finals	
Athlete	Event	Time	Rank	Opposition time	Opposition time	Opposition time	Opposition time	Rank
Ivan Ranchev	Men's parallel giant slalom	1:22.83	26	Did not advance				
Aleksandra Zhekova	Women's parallel giant slalom	DNS						

Snowboard cross

Athlete	Event	Qualifying		1/8 finals	Quarterfinals	Semifinals	Finals	
Athlete	Event	Time	Rank	Position	Position	Position	Position	Rank
Aleksandra Zhekova	Women's snowboard cross	DNF			Did not advance			

== See also ==
- Bulgaria at the 2010 Winter Paralympics
