= Gurgel (surname) =

Gurgel is a surname. Notable people with the surname include:

- Fábio Gurgel (born 1970), Brazilian jiu-jitsu practitioner
- João do Amaral Gurgel (1926–2009), Brazilian businessman
- Jorge Gurgel (born 1977), Brazilian mixed martial artist
- Luciana Gurgel (born 1982), Brazilian politician
- Melissa Gurgel (born 1994), Brazilian designer, model and beauty pageant titleholder
- Newton Holanda Gurgel (1923–2017), Brazilian Roman Catholic prelate
- Roberto Gurgel (born 1954), Brazilian prosecutor
- Silvino Gurgel do Amaral (1874–1961), Brazilian diplomat
- Udo Gurgel (born 1938), German engineer and designer of luge, bobsled and skeleton tracks
- Zoila Frausto Gurgel (born 1983), American professional female mixed martial artist and kickboxer
