= Goitschel =

Goitschel is a surname. Notable people with the surname include:

- Christine Goitschel (born 1944), French alpine skier
- Marielle Goitschel (born 1945), French alpine skier, sister of Christine
- Philippe Goitschel (born 1962), French alpine skier, nephew of Christine and Marielle
