= Lee Yong =

Lee Yong (이용) may refer to:

- Lee Yong (luger) (born 1978), South Korean luger
- Lee Yong (footballer, born 1986), South Korean footballer
- Lee Yong (footballer, born 1989), South Korean footballer
- Lee Yong (politician) (1888–1954), North Korean politician
