= Mohamed Hadid =

Palestinian-American real estate developer (born 1948)

- Born: Mohamed Anwar Hadid; November 6, 1948 (age 78); Nazareth (now Israel)
- Citizenship: US; Jordan
- Occupation: Real estate developer
- Years active: Late 1970s–present
- Known for: Developing mansions in Bel Air and Beverly Hills, California
- Spouses: Mary Butler (div. 1992); Yolanda van den Herik (m. 1994; div. 2000)
- Partner: Shiva Safai (2014–2019)
- Children: 6, including Gigi and Bella
- Website: mohamedhadid.com

Mohamed Anwar Hadid (/həˈdiːd/ hə-DEED; Arabic: محمد أنور حديد; born November 6, 1948) is a Palestinian-American real estate developer. He is known for building luxury hotels and mansions, mainly in the Bel Air neighborhood of Los Angeles and the city of Beverly Hills, California. He is the father of models Gigi and Bella Hadid. Born in Nazareth, Hadid immigrated to the United States as a teenager.

== Early life ==
Hadid was born into a Palestinian Muslim family on November 6, 1948, in Nazareth. His parents were Khairiah (née Daher; 1925–2008) and Anwar Mohamed Hadid (1918–1989). Hadid has two brothers and five sisters. Through Khairiah, he claims descent from Daher al-Umar, an 18th-century Arab ruler of northern Palestine. Anwar studied at teachers' college in Jerusalem and attended university in Syria to study law before working in land settlement for the British Mandatory authorities and teaching English at a teachers' college in Palestine.

During the 1948 Palestine war, the family fled to Lebanon as part of the expulsion and flight. The same year, they moved to Damascus, Syria, where Anwar joined the United States Information Agency (USIA) and Voice of America (VOA). There, all of them obtained Jordanian citizenship when Anwar defeated the Jordanian ambassador in backgammon; by then, the family had been stateless for seven years. In 1989, Hadid stated that they left Palestine because Anwar "did not want the family to live under the Israeli occupation." In 2015, Hadid stated in a post on Instagram: "...[W]e became refugees to Syria and we lost our home in Safad to a Jewish family that we sheltered when they were refugees from Poland on the ship that was sailing from country to country and no one would take them... they were our guest for 2 years till they made us refugees and they kicked us out of our own home."

The family lived in Damascus, Tunisia, and Greece before moving to Washington, D.C., when Hadid was 14 years old, as Anwar had a job at the VOA headquarters there and spent the rest of his career there with VOA and USIA as a writer, editor, and translator. Hadid holds dual Jordanian and US citizenship, and identifies as an American Palestinian. He graduated from Washington-Lee High School, where he was the only Arab student, before attending North Carolina State University and the Massachusetts Institute of Technology.

== Career ==
Among his early ventures was a company that exported equipment to the Middle East. He started his career restoring and reselling classic cars in the Georgetown neighbourhood of Washington, D.C., before moving to Greece, where he opened a nightclub on an island, and with the profits, started developing real estate in the United States.

In the 1980s, much of his financial clout came from the SAAR Foundation, a Herndon-based foundation with Saudi roots. The foundation was a 50–50 partner in many of Hadid's ventures. In the late 1980s, he faced at least 30 lawsuits from creditors and banks claiming he had not fulfilled various financial obligations. He paid $150 million for the Ritz-Carlton hotels in Washington and New York. He also converted a Houston hotel into a Ritz-Carlton Hotel and developed a Ritz-Carlton resort in Scottsdale, Arizona. He outmaneuvered Donald Trump, paying $42.9 million for several choice parcels in Aspen and announcing plans for a 292-room Ritz resort.

In 1992, a settlement was reached in a lawsuit by Riggs Bank against Columbia First Bank Chairman Melvin Lenkin, a Hadid partner in a Washington, D.C., construction project that involved a loan on which Hadid defaulted. Following the settlement Hadid closed his local office, lost his McLean home to foreclosure, and left the Washington area.

He developed Le Belvedere, a mansion in Bel Air, Los Angeles, that sold for $50 million in 2010. In 2012, he developed The Crescent Palace, a 48,000-square-foot home on an acre plot next door to the Beverly Hills Hotel, which he listed for sale at $58 million.

=== Estate on Strada Vecchia Road ===
Shortly after Hadid received approval for the construction of a mansion in Bel Air, the Bel Air Homeowners Alliance, chaired by Fred Rosen, was formed to oppose it. In January 2015, Nancy Walton Laurie, an heiress to the Walmart fortune and a Bel Air resident, filed a lawsuit through her company, LW Partnership, against Hadid. Laurie accused Hadid of damaging the roots of a eucalyptus tree on her property with a retaining wall he built next to her house.

In December 2015, the Los Angeles City Council voted to pursue criminal charges over a claim that Hadid violated local zoning laws. The council alleged he built his house contrary to multiple planning orders and made it twice the permitted size. In May 2017, Hadid pleaded no contest to misdemeanor charges stemming from mansion-construction issues for which he did not receive city approval, and was sentenced that July to community service and fines.

In July 2017, he was sentenced to 200 hours of community service, summoned to return $14,191 to the City of Los Angeles in damages, and fined $3,000. He was also given a three-year probation period to ensure the property would comply with existing regulations, or he would face a 180-day jail sentence.

A 2018 civil lawsuit filed by multiple neighbors resulted in Hadid being made to pay a reward of $3 million. In 2019, Los Angeles County Superior Court Judge Craig D. Karlan ordered the demolition of the 30,000 sq ft (2,800 m^{2}) structure, declaring that it put neighbors at, "legitimate risk of suffering damage and harm to their home." The property was offloaded by Hadid in an auction, with the winning bidder paying $5 million.

=== Athletic career ===
Hadid competed in the demonstration sport of speed skiing at the 1992 Winter Olympics, representing Jordan. He was 43 years old at the time. Hadid was encouraged to participate by his friend, Austrian Olympic skier Franz Weber. Hadid was the only member of the Jordanian delegation, and remains the only person to have represented Jordan in the Winter Olympics.

== Television appearances ==
Hadid has appeared on the TV show The Real Housewives of Beverly Hills, as the ex-husband of Yolanda Hadid. He has also appeared on Shahs of Sunset, and Second Wives Club on E! with his fiancée Shiva Safai in 2017.

== Personal life ==
Hadid's first marriage was with Mary Butler, with whom he had two daughters, Alana Hadid and Marielle Hadid. He and Butler ended their marriage in 1992.

From 1994 until their divorce in 2000, he was married to the Dutch model Yolanda Hadid, née Van den Herik. They had three children, who all became models: Gigi (born 1995), Bella (born 1996), and Anwar (born 1999). After his marriage ended, he had a brief relationship with a woman that ended with the birth of his youngest daughter, Aydan Nix.

In 2014, Hadid was engaged to Shiva Safai, a model and businesswoman. She was born in Iran and raised in Norway, and at age 19, moved to Los Angeles with her family. Safai, who is 33 years his junior, began to appear in E! reality show, Second Wives Club in 2017. As of December 2019, Hadid and Safai had split.

On November 13, 2026, he became engaged to television personality, author, and entrepreneur Keni Silva.

Hadid does not consider himself a devout Muslim but does not drink or smoke and fasts during Ramadan. He has never drunk alcohol, although he does have a 5,000-bottle wine cellar, including some from his own Beverly Hills winery.
