= Franz Weber =

Franz Weber may refer to:

- Franz Weber (actor) (1888–1962), German actor
- Franz Weber (footballer) (1888–1947), Austrian football player
- Franz Weber (soldier) (1921–2014), German soldier
- Franz Weber (activist) (1927–2019), Swiss environmentalist and animal welfare activist
- Franz Weber (skier) (born 1956), Austrian skier
