= Alessandro Casse =

Italian ski racer (1946–2021)

- Born: 30 April 1946; Oulx, Italy
- Died: 22 December 2021 (aged 75); Vercelli, Italy
- Occupation: Ski racer

Alessandro Casse (30 April 1946 – 22 December 2021) was an Italian ski racer.

== Life and career ==
Born in Oulx, Casse formed at the Edoardo Agnelli ski school in Sestriere, and later joined the Sci club Sestriere team. He competed in several specialties but specialized in the speed skiing specialty, in which he established the world record (112.49 m.p.h.) in 1971 at Cervinia, a record he himself improved in 1973 (114.227 m.p.h.).

After his retirement, he was a coach, training among others the Olympic gold medalist Piero Gros. He later relocated in Vercelli, where he ran a sport store together with his wife.

Casse was the father of World Cup alpine ski racer Mattia Casse. He died on 22 December 2021, at the age of 75.

== See also ==
- Speed skiing world records
