= Renata Kolarova =

Swiss speed skier (born 1966)

Medal record

Representing Switzerland

Women's speed skiing

Winter Olympic Games
| Bronze medal – third place | 1992 Albertville | Speed skiing |

Renata Kolarova (born 14 April 1966) is a Swiss former speed skier. She won the bronze medal in the women's speed skiing demonstration event at the 1992 Winter Olympics in Albertville.

At the 1992 Olympics, Kolarova and the rest of the Swiss team were given the choice to race or withdraw after the death of their team colleague Nicolas Bochatay in a training run. Kolarova and Silvano Meli decided to compete while two other male racers withdrew. In the competition, Kolarova placed third with a speed of 210.526 kilometres per hour (131 mph).
