= Bahman Golbarnezhad =

Iranian Paralympic athlete

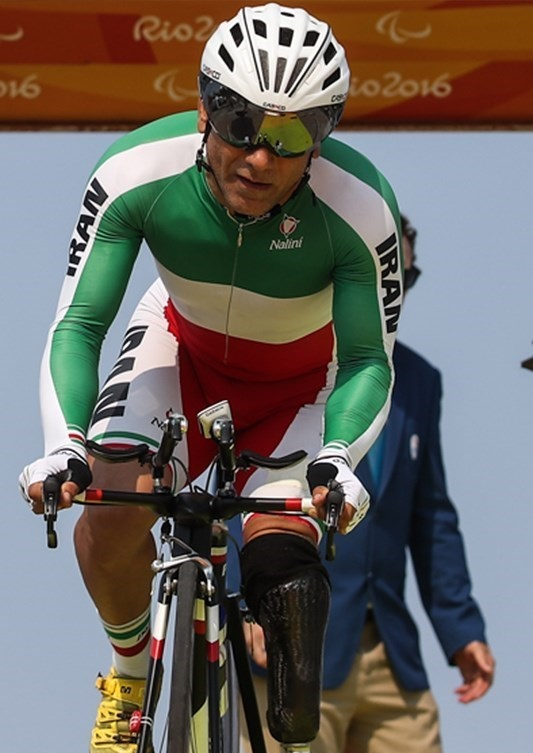
- Golbarnezhad competing in the 2016 Summer Paralympics

Personal information
- Nationality: Iranian
- Born: 12 June 1968 Abadan, Iran
- Died: 17 September 2016 (aged 48) Rio de Janeiro, Brazil

Sport
- Country: Iran
- Sport: Track and road cycling
- Disability class: C4

Bahman Golbarnezhad (Persian: بهمن گلبارنژاد, 12 June 1968 – 17 September 2016) was an Iranian Paralympic racing cyclist competing in C4 classification events and an earlier powerlifter. During his powerlifting career, he won twelve gold medals and one silver medal in international competitions. Golbarnezhad had represented Iran in two Summer Paralympic Games, first in 2012 in London and later in 2016 in Rio de Janeiro. He was the only Iranian cyclist at the 2016 Paralympics. He was a veteran of the Iran–Iraq war.

On 17 September 2016, Golbarnezhad died in an accident which occurred during the 2016 Summer Paralympics' men's C4-5 road cycling event.

== Early life and career ==
Golbarnezhad was born and raised in Abadan, Iran. During the Iran–Iraq War, he relocated to Shiraz. In 1988, he fought for Iran in the war and lost his left leg when he walked on a land mine. Three years after his injury, he started his professional sporting career first as a wrestler, then he turned to weightlifting. In his weightlifting career, he won twelve gold medals and one silver medal. He stopped weightlifting due to a shoulder injury and started cycling in 2006. He qualified for 2012 London Paralympics the same year that his first wife died due to cancer. Golbarnezhad and his wife had one son.

== Major competitions ==
2012 Summer Paralympics
DNF Men's road race C4-5
18th Men's 1 km time trial C4-5

2016 Summer Paralympics
14th Men's time trial C4
DNF Men's road race C4-5

== Death ==
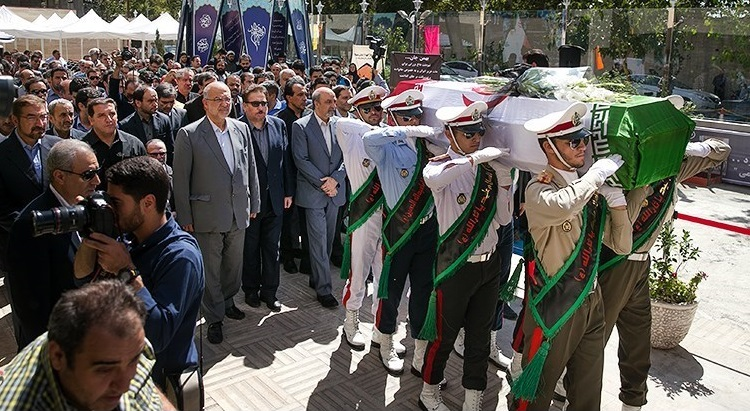
Funeral of Golbarnezhad in Tehran, 22 September 2016

During the men's C4-5 road cycling event on 17 September 2016 at the 2016 Summer Paralympics, Golbarnezhad suffered a head injury during a collision with a rock on a mountainous stretch of the circuit in Pontal, a small peninsula and beach area in the Recreio dos Bandeirantes neighborhood of western Rio. Golbarnezhad was treated on-site, and was in the process of being transported to the athletes' hospital when he died from a cardiac arrest. The Union Cycliste Internationale (UCI) announced that it would investigate the incident, and the I. R. Iran National Paralympic Committee requested a report on the incident from the IPC. Golbarnezhad's death marked the first time since the 1960 Summer Olympics that an Olympic or Paralympic athlete had died during competition.

Following the incident, the flag of Iran was lowered to half-staff in the Paralympic Village, and for the Iranian sitting volleyball victory against Bosnia and Herzegovina. A period of silence was also held during the closing ceremony of the 2016 Summer Paralympics.

=== Reactions to his death ===
- The IPC President Sir Philip Craven: "This is truly heart-breaking news and the thoughts and condolences of the whole Paralympic Movement are with Bahman's family, friends, and teammates as well as the whole of the National Paralympic Committee (NPC) of Iran. The Paralympic Family is united in grief at this horrendous tragedy which casts a shadow over what have been great Paralympic Games here in Rio."
- Iranian Paralympic Committee: "He was an exemplary Paralympic sportsman who, with love and energy, tried his best to promote the name of Iran and to make all of us proud and at the end he gave his life for this. All members of the Iranian cultural and sports camp here express condolences to his family and the Iranian nation. The name of Bahman Golbarnezhad will be inscribed in the proud history of Iranian Paralympics."
- Carlos Arthur Nuzman, president of the Rio 2016 Organizing Committee: "This is very sad news for sport and for the Paralympic movement. Our hearts and prayers are with Bahman's family, his team-mates and all the people of Iran."
- Brian Cookson: "Devastated to hear about the death of Iranian rider Bahman Golbarnezhad. Our thoughts are with his family and friends, and the NPC of Iran to whom we offer our most sincere condolences."
- Iranian president Hassan Rouhani condoled the demise of Golbarnezhad and said on his Twitter account that "The death of Bahman Golbarnezhad during Rio Paralympic Games is sad news for all of us."
- The Iranian men's national sitting volleyball team dedicated their gold win at the 2016 Summer Paralympics to the memory of Bahman Golbarnezhad.

== See also ==
- Olympic deaths
- List of cyclists with a cycling related death
