= Ross Anderson (skier) =

American alpine skier (born 1971)

- Ross Anderson

Personal information
- Citizenship: Cheyenne and Arapaho Tribes, American
- Born: May 8, 1971 (age 54) Alamogordo, New Mexico
- Home town: Durango, Colorado
- Spouse: Juanita Anderson 2024
- Children: Sierra Star Anderson Born 2003 (Age 19) https://www.youtube.com/watch?v=Im3secQRrV8 https://www.fieldlevel.com/app/profile/sierra.anderson/softball
- Website: rossanderson.org

Sport
- Sport: speed skiing

Ross Anderson (born 1971) is a FIS World Cup/professional speed skier as well as All American Record Holder speed skier a speed of 154.06 mph.

== Background ==
Ross Anderson was born on May 8, 1971, in Holloman Air Force Base, New Mexico He is an enrolled member of the Cheyenne and Arapaho Tribes and a Mescalero Apache and Choctaw descendant. He grew up in Durango, Colorado and now lives in Albuquerque, New Mexico.

== Skiing career ==
He broke the former All American record in 2006 with a speed of 154.06 mph flying past the former record held by John Hembel from Aspen Colorado with a speed of 153.03 mph at Les Arcs France 2006." On April 19, places him 10th in the world all-time rankings.

== Honors and recognition ==
- Ski New Mexico and New Mexico Ski Hall of Fame – Lifetime Achievement Award (October 26, 2024); first Indigenous person to be inducted.
- Colorado Snowsports Hall of Fame – Inducted September 7, 2024; first Indigenous person to be inducted.
- U.S. Ski and Snowboard Hall of Fame – Inducted March 2024; first Indigenous athlete ever inducted.
- North American Indigenous Athletics Hall of Fame – Inducted 2023.
- National Native American Hall of Fame – Inducted 2025.
- Eight-time National Champion.
- Four-time podium finisher.
- All-American Record Holder (2006–present) – recognized as the "Fastest skier in the Western Hemisphere".
- Marketing consultant in outdoor and action sports.
- Former action sports model.
Les Arc, France

In Canada 2008
