= Tarja Mulari =

Finnish speed skier (born 1965)

Medal record

Representing Finland

Women's speed skiing

Winter Olympic Games
Gold medal – first place	1992 Albertville	Speed skiing

Tarja Mulari (born 3 May 1965 in Kuopio) is a Finnish former speed skier. She is best known for winning the women's speed skiing demonstration event at the 1992 Winter Olympics in Albertville, setting a then-world record of 219.245 kilometres per hour (136 mph).

== Career ==
Mulari began as an alpine skier but switched to speed skiing after breaking her kneecap in 1986. During her career, Mulari won 24 Speed Skiing World Cup races and two overall World Cup titles. At the 1992 Winter Olympics in Albertville, France, Mulari won the women's speed skiing demonstration event, recording a speed of 219.245 km/h and breaking her own world record, which had been set in 1988. She is the only woman to have won a speed skiing title at the Olympic Games.

After retiring from competition in spring 1992, Mulari worked in marketing and corporate development.
