= Johan Rousseau =

French luger (born 1978)

Personal information
- Nationality: French
- Born: 8 October 1978 (age 46); Uppsala, Sweden

Sport
- Sport: Luge & Speed skiing

Johan Rousseau (born 8 October 1978) is a French luger and speed skier.

== Career ==
In April 1997, he became junior world recordman in speed skiing with a 228.426 km/h speed in Les Arcs (France). He got his best performance in 2005 in Les Arcs with a 245.065 km/h speed.

He competed in the men's singles event at the 2002 Winter Olympics where he finished 15th.
