= Rubén González (luger) =

Argentine luger (born 1962)

Ruben Gonzalez
- Born: Rubén Oscar González; 26 July 1962 (age 64); Campana, Buenos Aires, Argentina
- Other names: "The Luge Man", "Speedy"
- Education: Houston Christian University
- Occupation: Motivational keynote speaker
- Known for: Olympian, author, speaker
- Website: ruben-gonzalez.com

Rubén Oscar González (born 26 July 1962) is a four-time Olympian, a professional keynote speaker and a bestselling author.

González competed in the men's luge from 1988 to 2010. Competing in four Winter Olympics, he holds the record for being the first athlete to participate in four different Winter Olympics in four different decades.

== Early life ==
González was born in Campana, Argentina, an oil town about 50 miles north of Buenos Aires. His father worked as a chemical engineer at the local Exxon refinery. His family emigrated to the United States in 1968.

When González was 10 years old, while watching the 1972 Winter Olympics, he decided he wanted to become an Olympian.

Although he lived in Queens, New York, and Maracaibo, Venezuela, Gonzalez spent most of his life in Houston. He graduated from Houston Baptist University with degrees in chemistry and biology and played on the varsity soccer team.

== Olympic career ==
González took up the sport of luge when he was 21 after being inspired by watching figure skater Scott Hamilton win the gold medal at the 1984 Winter Olympics.

González trained in Lake Placid, New York and in Europe and competed in the 1988 Calgary, 1992 Albertville, 2002 Salt Lake City, and 2010 Vancouver Winter Olympics.

Because of his inspirational story, González was selected to be a torchbearer at the 2002 Winter Olympics.

González qualified for the 2010 Winter Olympics, at the age of 47. He told reporters that Vancouver 2010 would be his last Olympics, since the death of the Georgian luger Nodar Kumaritashvili gave him perspective on the sport.

== Writing and public speaking ==
Gonzalez is the author of "The Courage to Succeed," "The Inner Game of Success," "Fight for Your Dream," "Dream, Struggle, Victory," "Success Secrets for Teens," "How to Get Where You Want to Be," "Launch Pad," and "The Shortcut." His books intend to teach sports, business and life principles.

His bestselling books have been translated to over 10 languages and sold over 300,000 copies.

González has been a professional motivational keynote speaker since 2002. Gonzalez has spoken for over 100 of the Fortune 500 companies about developing mental toughness, attitude, and the principles that lead to success in business and in life.

In 2021, Ruben gave a TED Talk titled "The Power of Following the Leader".

== Media ==
González is a frequent media guest on success principles, peak performance, leadership, change, sales and mental toughness. He's appeared on ABC, CBS, NBC, Fox News, CNN and more. His articles have been published around the world.

== Personal life ==
He now resides in where he continues his work as a professional keynote speaker.

== Sources ==
- Darlington, Nick (2017). “Finding the Courage to Succeed,”. H.U.G.E. Magazine.
- Beaulieu, Ken (2010). “Mental Toughness in Business, in the Olympics and in Life”. Continental Airlines Magazine.
- Azevedo, Ann (2009). “Olympian Ruben Gonzalez Talks and Companies Listen”. Houston Business Journal
- Rogers, Martin (2016). “Transitioning to Life after the Olympics”. USA Today
- Rampton, John (2017). “How to Hack Our Brain for Success”. Entrepreneur
- Nichols, Michelle (2008). “It’s Not Just About Sales Goals”. BusinessWeek
- Tutton, Mark (2009). “Business Lessons from an Olympic Luger”. CNN
- Hairopoulos, Kate (2010). “Luge’s Celebration Shaken in Vancouver”. Dallas News
- Conner, Cheryl (2016). “10 Top Keynote Speakers Tell How Presenting Advances their PR Success”. Forbes
- Abrams, Jonathan (2010). “End of Run for 47-Year-Old Luger?”. New York Times
- Herman, Martyn (2010). “Olympics-Luge-Broken Bones just Horse Play for Speedy Gonzalez”. Reuters
- Atance, Christian (2010). “Ruben Gonzalez Luge - Espiritu Olimpico”. Ski Mundial.
- Botchford, Jason (2010). “Adjustments to Luge Track Handicap Favorites”. Vancouver Sun
- Fuchs, Thomas (2007). “Talking Business with Ruben Gonzalez: The Champion’s Creed”. Success
- Darlington, Nick (2017). “Finding the Courage to Succeed,”. H.U.G.E. Magazine.
- Canfield, Jack (2015). "Take Action". The Success Principles, 10th Anniversary
