= Pierre-Yves Jorand =

Swiss sailor

Pierre-Yves Jorand (born 20 May 1963) is a Swiss speed skier and sailor who has competed at multiple America's Cups.

Jorand joined North Sails Switzerland in 1984. Jorand was also a speed skier and was European champion. In 1984, he was the first skier to go faster than 200 km/h. He then represented Switzerland at the 1992 Winter Olympics, where he competed in the speed skiing event, which was a demonstration sport. On the morning of the finals, Jorand was warming up with a fellow competitor, Nicolas Bochatay, when Bochatay crashed into a snowmobile and died instantly.

He joined Alinghi and was their technical coach at the 2003 and 2007 America's Cups. He was then a main trimmer on the catamaran Alinghi 5 during the 2010 America's Cup. Since then, he has sailed with Alinghi in the Extreme Sailing Series.

In 2014 he joined the sailing selection committee for the Swiss Olympic Association.
