= Nodar Kumaritashvili =

Georgian luge athlete (1988–2010)

- Official IOC picture of Kumaritashvili

Personal information
- Full name: Nodar Kumaritashvili; (Georgian: ნოდარ ქუმარიტაშვილი)
- Born: 25 November 1988 Borjomi, Georgian SSR, Soviet Union
- Died: 12 February 2010 (aged 21) Whistler, British Columbia, Canada
- Home town: Bakuriani, Georgia
- Education: Georgian Technical University
- Height: 1.79 m (5 ft 10 1/2 in)
- Weight: 80 kg (176 lb)

Sport
- Country: Georgia
- Sport: Luge
- Turned pro: 2008

Nodar Kumaritashvili (Georgian: ნოდარ ქუმარიტაშვილი; pronounced [nodaɾ kʰumaɾitʼaʃʷili]; 25 November 1988 – 12 February 2010) was a Georgian luge athlete who suffered a fatal crash during a training run for the 2010 Winter Olympics competition in Whistler, British Columbia, Canada, on the day of the opening ceremony. He became the fourth athlete to die during preparations for a Winter Olympics, and the eighth athlete to die as a result of Olympic competition or during practice at their sport's venue at an Olympic Games.

Kumaritashvili, who first began to participate in luge when he was 13, came from a family of seasoned lugers: his grandfather had introduced the sport to Soviet Georgia, and both his father and uncle had competed when they were younger, with his uncle later serving as the head of the Georgian Luge Federation. Kumaritashvili himself began competing in the 2008–09 Luge World Cup. He had also been a student at the Georgian Technical University, where he earned an economics degree in 2009.

== Life and career ==
Kumaritashvili was born on 25 November 1988, in Borjomi, Georgian SSR, present-day Georgia, to David and Dodo Kumaritashvili. He had one sister, Mariam, who was four years younger.

Kumaritashvili's family had a long association with luge. His grandfather Aleko Kumaritashvili introduced luge to Georgia after first training for it in East Germany. Aleko helped build a primitive luge run in Bakuriani in 1970; a more finished track, funded by the Soviet authorities, was built in 1973. Kumaritashvili's uncle and coach, Felix Kumaritashvili, served as the head of the Georgian Luge Federation. His father David won a USSR Youth Championship when Georgia was part of the Soviet Union, and he was a three-time champion at the Spartakiad: once in two-man bobsleigh and twice in luge. Kumaritashvili's cousin, Saba Kumaritashvili, later competed in luge at the 2022 Winter Olympics.

Kumaritashvili grew up in nearby Bakuriani, which is known for its many ski slopes. He enjoyed several winter sports and started luge when he was 13 years old. While attending the Georgian Technical University, where he graduated with a bachelor's degree in economics in 2009, Kumaritashvili maintained a rigorous training and competition schedule. Though his family endured economic hardship, Kumaritashvili attended as many luge events as he could, often driving for days to reach World Cup events. As a devout member of the Georgian Orthodox Church, he prayed at church before every competition.

During his first season of competition, Kumaritashvili finished 55th out of 62 competitors at the 2008–09 Luge World Cup, where he was entered in four races. He finished 28th out of 32 competitors at the 2009–10 Luge World Cup event at Cesana Pariol in January, which was his fifth and last World Cup event. At the time of his death, he was ranked 44th out of 65 competitors in the 2009–10 World Cup season and was regarded as one of the best lugers to come from Georgia.

By 31 December 2009, the cut-off date for luge qualifications for the Olympics, Kumaritashvili was ranked 38th overall. He qualified for the luge men's singles event at the 2010 Winter Olympics, his Olympic debut, by racing in five World Cup races over two years.

== Olympic luge track ==
The venue for the Olympic luge competition, the Whistler Sliding Centre, was designed by Udo Gurgel and his firm, Ingenieurburo Gurgel (IBG) of Leipzig. Using the specified track dimensions for a variety of sled entrance and exit trajectories, IBG calculated the predicted speeds and G forces an athlete would experience in each curve of the track. After a series of studies and track realignments, the final design was produced on 23 October 2004. Although a top speed was not requested for the design, IBG indicated that it was in the nature of sliding sports to have a faster track than the one before. However, the new curve configurations were expected to provide the main challenge, not the speed alone. The maximum calculated speed for men's luge was 136.3 km/h (84.7 mph).

In February 2005, concerns arose regarding the difficulties posed by Cesana Pariol, the track built for the 2006 Winter Olympics in Turin, Italy. Several serious crashes occurred, prompting calls for physical modifications to that track. The International Luge Federation (FIL) was concerned that similar modifications might be required at the Whistler track and communicated these concerns to the Vancouver Organizing Committee (VANOC) in March 2005. Uncertainty about the track design persisted into 2006 until the scheduled start of track construction, when it was determined that construction would be based on the original design.

After construction, during the track homologation (certification) process, the track produced speeds exceeding the design calculations by at least 10 km/h (6.2 mph). Following the Olympic test event in February 2009, Josef Fendt, president of FIL, sent a letter to IBG expressing surprise that a record speed of 153.937 km/h (95.652 mph) had been reached, concluding that the designer's calculations were incorrect, and stating that the high speed "makes me worry." The letter also said that "overstepping this limit would be an absolute unreasonable demand for the athletes." He asked IBG to respond, in particular with regard to the future Sochi Olympic track. Fendt also informed VANOC that the Whistler track was not supplied as ordered. VANOC, however, concluded that no action was required regarding the Whistler track, since the focus of Fendt's letter to IBG was the new Sochi track.

In April 2009, IBG explained that the differences between the calculated and actual observed speeds were caused by new sled technology that reduced drag coefficients and ice friction coefficients. Because of the secrecy inherent in sled development, the IBG engineers had difficulty obtaining the latest sled specifications required for their engineering calculations. In the view of the Games organizers, the high speeds and technical challenges could be safely mitigated by imposing additional practice and graduated training requirements on the athletes.

== Fatal accident ==
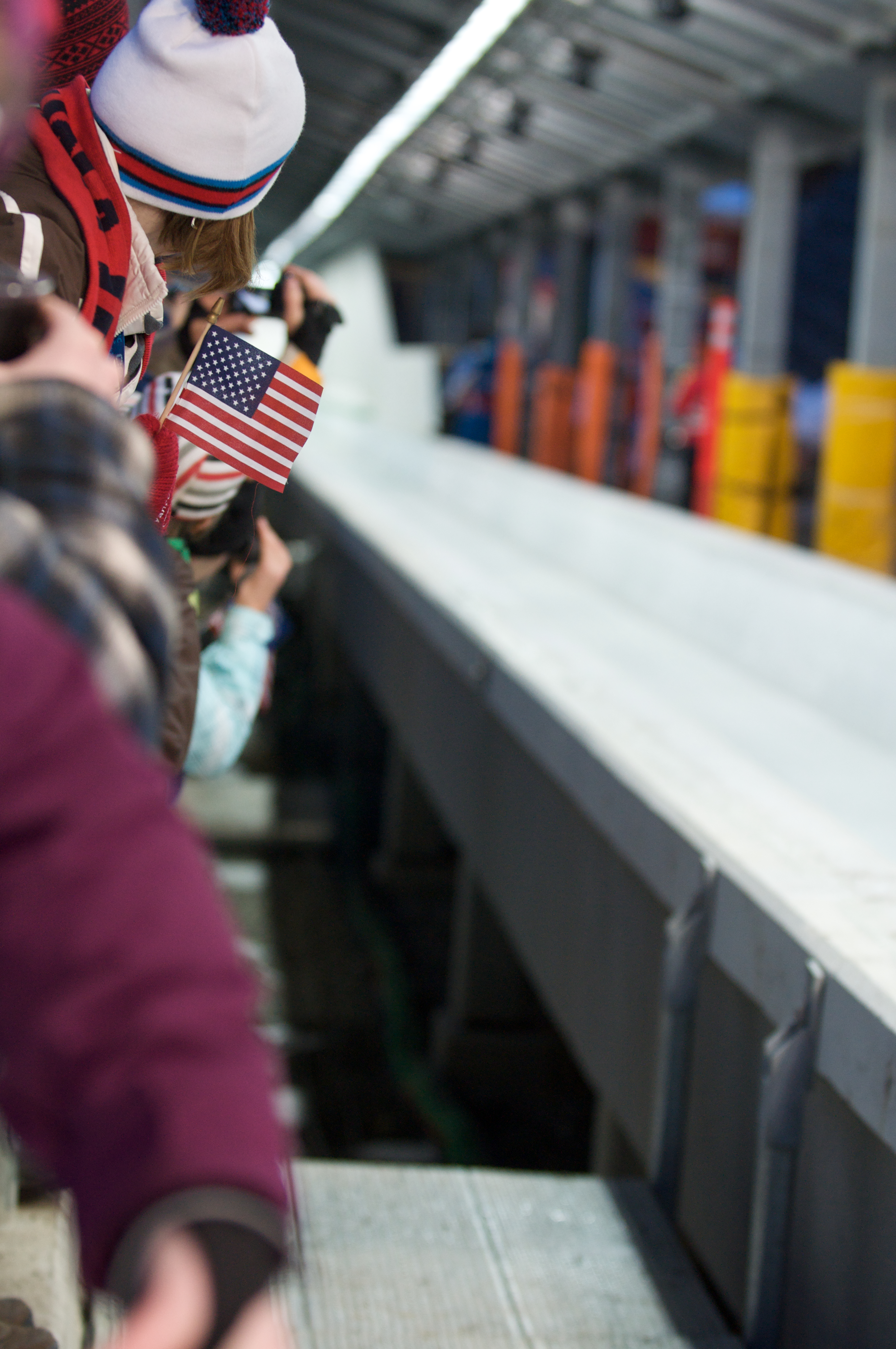
Spectators at the Whistler Sliding Centre look down the track as sliders pass the point where Kumaritashvili crashed.

On 12 February 2010, after 25 previous attempts, 15 of them from the men's start, Kumaritashvili was fatally injured in a crash during his final training run, after losing control in the last turn of the course. He was thrown off his luge and over the sidewall of the track, striking an unpadded steel support pole at the end of the run. He was travelling at 143.6 km/h (89.2 mph) at the moment of impact.

Medics were at Kumaritashvili's side immediately after the crash. Both cardio-pulmonary and mouth-to-mouth resuscitation were performed. He was airlifted to the Whistler Health Care Centre, where he died of his injuries. It was luge's first fatality since 10 December 1975, when Italian luger Luigi Craffonara had been killed. Kumaritashvili became the fourth athlete to die during preparations for a Winter Olympics, after British luger Kazimierz Kay-Skrzypecki and Australian skier Ross Milne (both 1964 Innsbruck), and Swiss speed skier Nicolas Bochatay (1992 Albertville). He was also the sixteenth participating athlete to die during the course of the Olympic Games, including practice at the Olympic venue before the opening ceremony.

=== Mourning ===
After footage of Kumaritashvili's death was televised, there was shock and mourning in Georgia. In response to the accident, the Georgian team announced that it would consider skipping the opening ceremonies or withdrawing from the games entirely, but Nika Rurua, the Georgian minister for sports and culture, later announced the team would stay in Vancouver and "dedicate their efforts to their fallen comrade". At the opening ceremony, only hours after Kumaritashvili was killed, the seven remaining members of the Georgian Olympic team wore black armbands, bore the Georgian flag with a black ribbon tied to it, and left a space vacant in the procession, as marks of respect. Upon entering BC Place Stadium, the Georgian team was greeted with a standing ovation from the assembled crowd. The team left the stadium immediately after the procession.

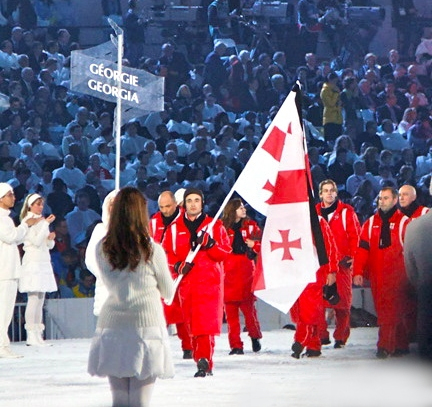
Georgian athletes during the opening ceremony

Later, during the opening ceremonies, a moment of silence was held to honour Kumaritashvili's memory, and both the Canadian and Olympic flags were lowered to half-mast. Fellow teammate and luger Levan Gureshidze, who was to compete with Kumaritashvili, withdrew after the crash, telling teammates that he "couldn't go on", and went home to attend the funeral. The lugers who stayed to compete all wore a black stripe on their helmets in honour of Kumaritashvili.

Early in the morning of 17 February 2010, Kumaritashvili's body arrived in Tbilisi. It reached his hometown of Bakuriani later that day. Thousands of Georgians attended a funeral feast for him on 19 February, and he was buried on 20 February at the church he had attended. Georgian President Mikheil Saakashvili attended the funeral service dressed in a Georgian Olympic uniform.

In Bakuriani, the street of Kumaritashvili's childhood home was renamed in his honour. Felix Loch of Germany, who won the gold medal in luge at the Vancouver Olympics, had his medal melted down and refashioned into two disks, giving one, etched with an image of Kumaritashvili and the years of his birth and death, to Kumaritashvili's parents. There were several donations of money made to the Kumaritashvili family. The tragedy remained hard on them; twice in the years afterwards, Dodo, who continued to fix a meal for Kumaritashvili every day, attempted suicide, while David dealt with severe health problems resulting in multiple hospital stays.

=== Emergency safety measures ===
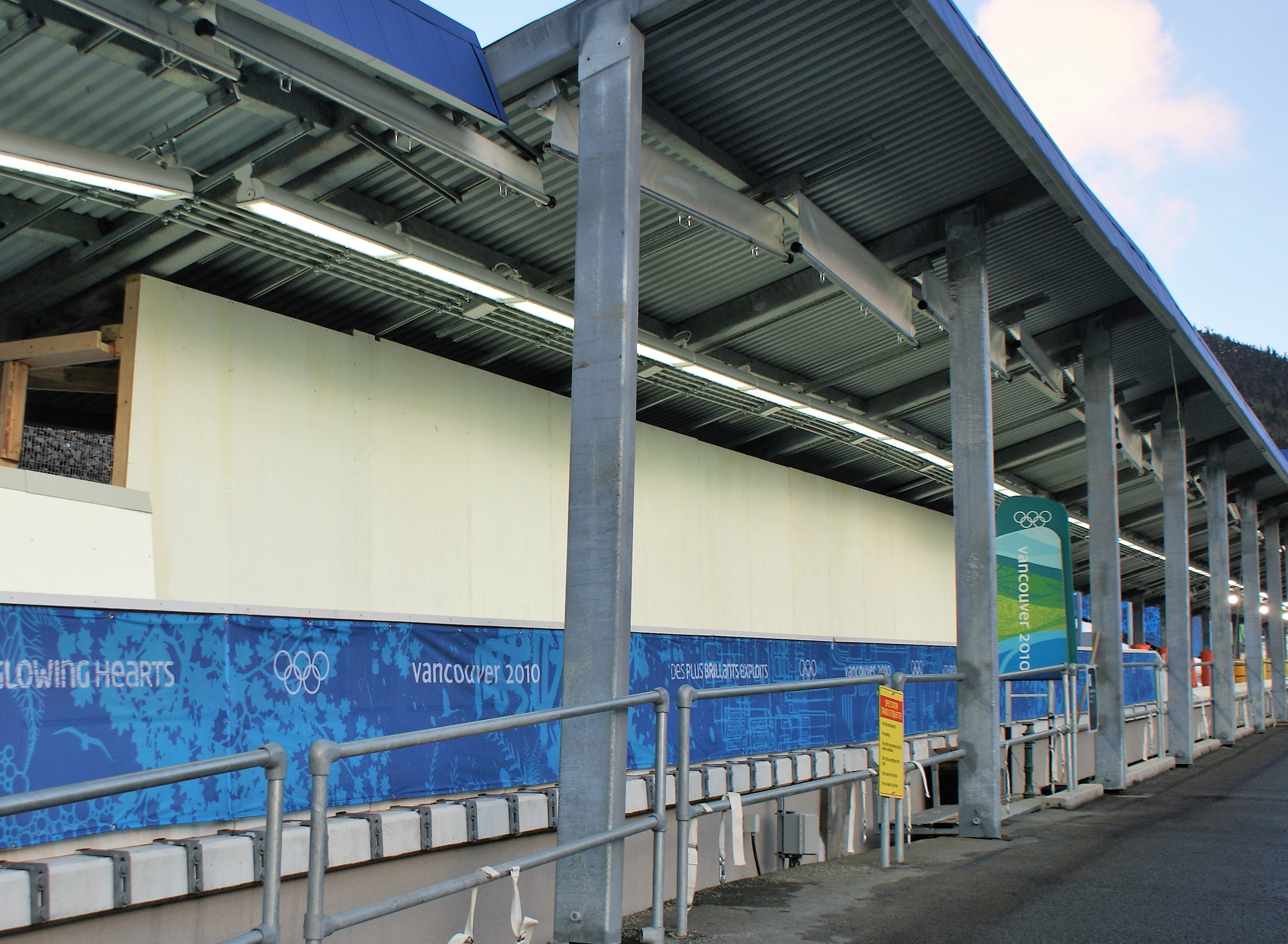
The wall that was installed just past the final turn of the Whistler Sliding Centre after the death of Kumaritashvili

The FIL stated that Kumaritashvili's death "was not caused by an unsafe track," but as a preventive measure the walls at the exit of curve 16 were raised, and the ice profile was adjusted. Padding was also added to exposed metal beams near the finish line. Olympic officials claimed the changes were "not for safety reasons but to accommodate the emotional state of the lugers." In addition, the start of the men's luge was moved to the women's starting point, to reduce speed, while the start of the women's luge was also moved farther down the track.

Training runs on the track resumed on 13 February, after the changes to the track were finished. Three lugers, including the departed Gureshidze, did not participate in any training runs on that day.

=== International Luge Federation report ===
On 19 April 2010, the FIL published its final report to the International Olympic Committee on Kumaritashvili's death. The report found that the sled used by Kumaritashvili had met all FIL standards. It attributed the accident to "driving errors starting in curve 15/16 which as an accumulation ended in the impact that resulted in him leaving the track and subsequently hitting a post... This is a tragic result that should not have occurred as a result of an initial driving error." As the sled hit the wall at the curve-16 exit, it catapulted off the track, causing Kumaritashvili to lose control of it entirely. This was a type of accident not seen before, and therefore "[w]ith the unknown and unpredictable dynamics of this crash, the calculation and construction of the walls in that section of the track did not serve to prevent the tragedy that happened." However, the report also determined that during the homologation process and later sessions at the Whistler Sliding Centre, the track was faster than originally calculated. Instead of the expected 136 km/h (85 mph), the highest speed recorded was 153.98 km/h (95.68 mph). The FIL felt that luge athletes were able to cope with this speed, but "this was not a direction the FIL would like to see the sport head [in]." FIL President Fendt wrote to the Sochi 2014 Olympic Organizing Committee that the FIL would homologate the proposed Sochi track only if speeds did not exceed 130 to 135 km/h (81 to 84 mph). The FIL also said it was "determined" to do what it could to prevent such accidents from occurring again. It would re-examine changes to the sport, sled design, and track technology. FIL Secretary General Svein Romstad summarized: "What happened to Nodar has been an unforeseeable fatal accident."

=== Coroner's report ===
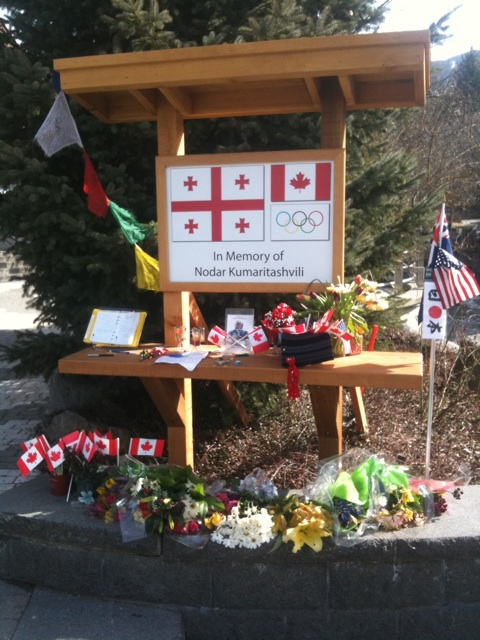
Kumaritashvili memorial, Whistler, 2010

The British Columbia Coroners Service investigated the incident. It was reported to be considering, among other pieces of evidence, written complaints about the safety of the Whistler track by Venezuelan luger Werner Hoeger – who crashed on the track on 13 November 2009, suffering a severe concussion – and information suggesting that the track was constructed in such a narrow and steep location, near the Whistler Blackcomb mountains, for commercial reasons. The track designer, Udo Gurgel, said: "The track had to be near Whistler, for use after the Olympics. You don't want to ruin an investment so the track is on terrain that's a little steep." According to John Furlong, the chief executive of the 2010 Winter Olympics organizing committee, proposals to build the sliding centre on Grouse Mountain near Vancouver were rejected early in the bid phase due to reservations expressed by the international luge, and the bobsleigh and skeleton, federations.

In a report dated 16 September 2010, the coroner ruled Kumaritashvili's death an accident brought on by an "interaction of factors," including the high speed of the track, its technical difficulty, and the athlete's relative unfamiliarity with the track. He wrote that during Kumaritashvili's training runs, it was reasonable to assume that "Mr. Kumaritashvili was sliding faster than ever before in his life, and was attempting to go even faster, while simultaneously struggling to learn the intricacies of the track and the dynamics it created." The coroner accepted that luging would always carry an element of risk and that the best practices known at the time had been followed in the construction of the Whistler track. He also called upon the FIL to require athletes to engage in more mandatory training sessions prior to the Olympic Games and other major competitions.

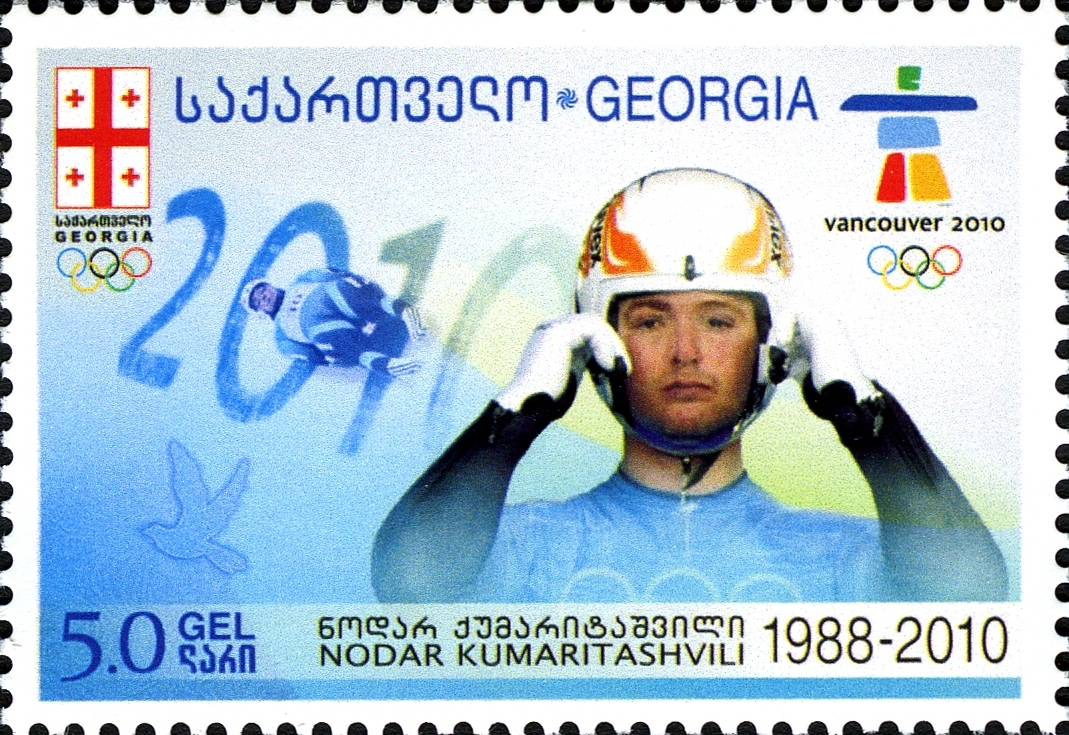
2010 Georgian postal stamp commemorating Kumaritashvili

The coroner also commented, "The organizers, regulatory bodies and venue owners must ensure that no effort is spared to anticipate the unforeseeable as far as safety is concerned," and to "err on the side of caution, insisting on more, rather than less."

Responding to the report, Kumaritashvili's father said: "I don't accept the statement about Nodar's lack of experience. He wouldn't have won the right to take part in the Olympics if he lacked experience."

=== Mont Hubbard report ===
In 2013, Mont Hubbard, a University of California, Davis, mechanical and aerospace engineering professor, issued a report claiming that Kumaritashvili's crash was probably caused by a "fillet," a joint between the lower edge of the curve and a vertical wall. Hubbard suggested that the right runner of Kumaritashvili's sled rose up the fillet, launching him into the air. Terry Gudzowsky, the president of ISC/IBG Group, a consortium involved in the construction of the Whistler track, dismissed Hubbard's theory as "flawed," stating that the data to replicate the ice surface at the site of the accident in three dimensions do not exist. The luge track built for use at the 2014 Winter Olympics in Sochi, Russia, was designed with two uphill sections to reduce speeds, and for runs about 10 miles per hour (16 km/h) slower than the Whistler track.

== See also ==
- Lists of sportspeople who died during their careers
- Sergei Chalibashvili
- Georgia at the 2010 Winter Olympics
- Georgia at the Olympics
- Luge at the 2010 Winter Olympics
