= Liss-Anne Pettersen =

Norwegian speed skier (born 1972)

Medal record

Representing Norway

Women's speed skiing

Winter Olympic Games
Silver medal – second place	1992 Albertville	Speed skiing

Liss-Anne Pettersen (born 7 November 1972) is a Norwegian speed skier. She won the silver medal in the women's speed skiing demonstration event at the 1992 Winter Olympics in Albertville.

== Career ==
Pettersen began speed skiing in 1986 and competed in her first World Cup in 1989. At the 1992 Olympic demonstration event, she placed second with a speed of 212.892 kilometres per hour (132 mph).

After a period of retirement, she returned to the sport in 2008. In 2013, she won the World Championships. Pettersen last competed in a World Cup race in January 2025 at the age of 52.

Pettersen has worked as a project engineer.
