= Jeff Christie =

Canadian luger (born 1983)

Jeff Christie (born February 2, 1983, in Vancouver, British Columbia) is a Canadian luger who has slid since 1995 and competed internationally since 2000. Competing in two Winter Olympics, he earned his best finish at 14th place in the men's singles event twice at the 2006 Winter Olympics and the 2010 Winter Olympics.

Christie's best finish at the FIL World Luge Championships was 12th in the men's singles event at Park City, Utah, in 2005.

His comments garnered attention regarding the death of Georgian luger Nodar Kumaritashvili when he criticized the change in start heights enacted, saying:

"The changes certainly haven't helped us. I've had 200-plus runs from the top. We put a lot of time, money and effort into coming here to slide off the top and they decided to move it down... yes, it's definitely a disadvantage. I have had all those runs from the top and I have the rhythm down. It's mentally tough to be able to switch that rhythm and come down from the ladies' start. It's going to be a grind for the next two races."

Jeff Christie also made an appearance on the reality show MTV Cribs.
