= Thomas Girod =

French luger (born 1983)

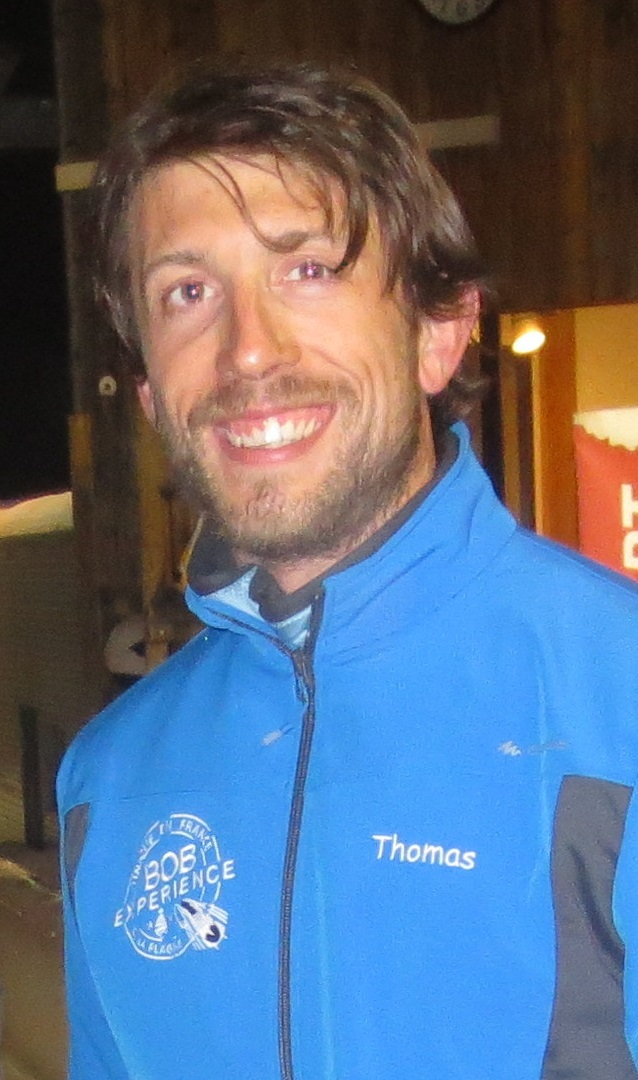
Thomas Girod

Thomas Girod (born 6 June 1983) is a French luger who has been competing since 1997. His best finish at the FIL World Luge Championships was 23rd place in the men's singles event at Oberhof in 2008.

Girod's best finish at the FIL European Luge Championships was 17th place in the men's singles event at Sigulda in 2010.

He qualified for the 2010 Winter Olympics, France's first luge qualification since the 2002 Winter Olympics. Girod finished in 22nd place.
