= Francisco Lázaro =

Portuguese marathon runner (1888–1912)

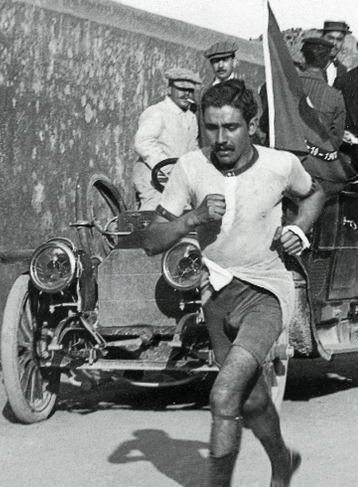

Personal information
- Born: 21 January 1888 Lisbon, Portugal
- Died: 15 July 1912 (aged 24) Stockholm, Sweden

Sport
- Sport: Athletics
- Event: Marathon

Achievements and titles
- Personal best: 2:52:08 (1912)

Francisco Lázaro (21 January 1888 – 15 July 1912) was a Portuguese Olympic marathon runner and Portugal's standard-bearer in their first-ever participation at the Olympic Games, the 1912 Summer Olympics in Stockholm, Sweden. He is known for having died of severe electrolyte imbalance during his Olympic competition, caused by an inability to properly perspire due to having covered his body in suet to prevent sunburn.

== Career ==
Like all the Olympic athletes of his time, Lázaro was an amateur sportsman. His actual job was as a carpenter in an automobile factory in Lisbon. Prior to the Olympics, he had won three national marathon championships in Portugal, where he represented S.L. Benfica.

Lázaro was the first athlete to die during a modern Olympic event after collapsing at the 30-kilometer mark (19 miles) of the marathon with a body temperature of 41 °C (105.8 °F). He was initially thought to have died of severe dehydration due to the high temperature registered at the time of the race. It was later discovered that Lázaro had covered large portions of his body with suet to prevent sunburn and to help with speed and lightness while running. However, the wax restricted his natural perspiration, leading to a fatal body fluid electrolyte imbalance. Before the race, he had reportedly said: "Either I win or I die."

The following weekend, a memorial service for Lázaro was attended by 23,000 people at the Olympic Stadium. Approximately US$3,800 (equivalent to $127,000 in 2025) was collected for his wife, and later a monument of Lázaro was placed at the marathon's turning point at Sollentuna, Stockholm. The novel The Piano Cemetery, by Portuguese novelist José Luís Peixoto, is based on Francisco Lázaro's story. A street in Lisbon and the stadium of C.F. Benfica are named after him.

== See also ==
- Olympic and Paralympic deaths
