= Michaël Prüfer =

French speed skier (born 1959)

Medal record

Representing France

Men's speed skiing

Winter Olympic Games
Gold medal – first place	1992 Albertville	Speed skiing

Michaël Prüfer (born 6 November 1959) is a French former speed skier and physician. He is best known for winning the speed skiing demonstration event at the 1992 Winter Olympics in Albertville, where he set a then-world record speed of 229.299 kilometres per hour (142 mph). He was one of the leading competitors in speed skiing during the late 1980s and early 1990s.

== Career ==
Prüfer emerged as one of the world's top speed skiers in the 1980s, setting world records in 1987 and 1988. He primarily represented France but also represented Monaco for a period around 1990.

At the 1992 Winter Olympics in Albertville, France, where speed skiing was contested as a demonstration sport, Prüfer won the men's event and established a new world record of 229.299 km/h. The achievement made him the only male athlete to win an Olympic speed skiing title, as the discipline was never included as a medal event in subsequent Olympic Games.

Prüfer worked as a doctor while still actively competing in speed skiing, and advised Formula 1 drivers such as Alain Prost. He currently works as an angiologist in France.
