= Steve McKinney (skier) =

American alpine skier and mountaineer

- Born: 1953; Baltimore, Maryland
- Died: November 10, 1990; Sacramento, California
- Occupations: Speed skier, mountaineer
- Known for: First person to break 200 km/h on skis; first person to fly a hang-glider off Mount Everest

Steve McKinney (1953 – November 10, 1990) was an American Alpine skier and mountaineer who is acknowledged as an early pioneer in the sport of extreme skiing. A gifted all-around athlete, McKinney is best remembered as a world-class speed skier. In 1978 at Portillo, Chile, McKinney's record-breaking run of 200.222 km/h (124.137 mph) made him the first speed skier to break the 200 km/h barrier. Between 1974 and 1987, McKinney set seven world speed skiing records in competitions around the world.

In the 1980s, McKinney became an accomplished mountain climber. In 1986 he led an expedition to Mount Everest, during which he became the first person to fly a hang-glider off the mountain.

Steve was one of eight McKinney children. His half-sister, Tamara McKinney, became a world champion World Cup skier.

== Early life ==
McKinney was born in Baltimore, Maryland in 1953. He and his family settled near Lake Tahoe, California. Steve regularly skied at nearby Squaw Valley, and was a junior ski racer with the Far West Ski Association. He graduated from high school through correspondence courses, and briefly attended the University of Colorado in 1971. He quit college soon after and joined the U.S. Ski Team as a downhill specialist. The independent-minded McKinney clashed with the team's authorities. He finally left the team in 1973 after making an advertising transaction, for which he was disqualified from amateur status.

After his departure from the U.S. Ski Team, McKinney's next pursuit was mountain climbing. One of his first ascents was at Donner Summit near Lake Tahoe. While attempting to climb a route called Rated X, McKinney fell 100 feet off the rock wall and broke his back and a heel bone. He spent the next several months in a full-torso body cast.

== Speed skiing ==
Steve was probably the most important speed skier who ever lived. He marked it more than anyone. He was special.

— Dick Dorworth

During winters at Squaw Valley, McKinney gained a reputation there for skiing long, expert-level runs at high speed using 225 cm downhill skis.

McKinney learned about speed skiing from his friend, Dick Dorworth, who was the first skier to break 105 mph. In speed skiing, the limits were few, so McKinney could ski as fast as he dared. In 1973, on a whim, he took a flight to Milan, Italy, and then hitchhiked to Cervinia to watch speed skiing on the Kilometro Lanciato ('flying kilometer'). He made his first tentative speed runs there, despite still wearing the body cast from his broken back.

The following year, in 1974, McKinney returned to Cervinia and established his first world speed skiing record, passing through the speed traps at 189.473 km/h (117.7 mph). His record was surpassed the following year at Cervinia. Two years after that, at Portillo, Chile in 1977, McKinney set a new record at 198.020 km/h (123.0 mph).

In 1978 at Portillo, McKinney broke his own record. His run at 200.222 km/h (124.137 mph) marked the first time a skier had ever broken the 200 km/h barrier. This record would stand for four years. In 1982 at Silverton, Colorado, McKinney saw his record surpassed by Franz Weber, with a run of more than 203 km/h. McKinney had been the fastest skier in the world for five years.

In 1987, in something of a comeback, McKinney placed 4th in Les Arcs, France, with a speed of 209.790 km/h (130.4 mph), the fastest speed he had ever recorded in competition.

During his speed skiing career, McKinney introduced rubberized ski suits and special aerodynamic helmets, both of which became standard equipment for the sport.

== Mountaineering ==
In 1981, McKinney took part in the Everest Grand Circle Expedition, the first expedition to navigate a circle around Mount Everest. This also included the first winter ascent of Pumori by an American team. In 1984, McKinney and Jim Bridwell undertook a successful ski descent of Denali. In 1986, McKinney returned to Everest as an expedition leader. He became the first person to fly a hang-glider at Mount Everest, making a flight from the West Ridge at about 22,000 feet. He also made an earlier, test flight at Base Camp, in which he survived a spectacular crash into a glacial moraine.

== Death ==
In the early hours of November 10, 1990, while on his way to San Francisco for a business meeting, McKinney pulled his Volkswagen off of Interstate 5 near Sacramento, California. Another car veered off the road and slammed into the back of the parked Volkswagen, killing McKinney. According to investigators, McKinney's car may have had mechanical problems, and he had apparently climbed into the back seat to sleep before seeking help.

== Honors ==
McKinney was honored posthumously with the North American Snowsports Journalists Association's inaugural Lifetime Achievement Award for 1992-93, for outstanding contributions to skiing.

== Quotations ==
- I discovered the middle path of stillness within speed, calmness within fear, and I held it longer and quieter than ever before. (On maintaining his composure during a world record speed skiing run, as described for SKI magazine, Spring/March 1975)
- Racing for pure speed is uncomplicated, straightforward, and decisive.
