= Ignaz Stiefsohn =

Olympic Glider (1911- 1936)

- Born: April 26, 1911; Vienna
- Died: August 3, 1936 (aged 25); Berlin

Ignaz Stiefsohn (April 26, 1911 - August 3, 1936) was an Austrian aviator who led the Austrian gliding team in the 1936 Olympics. Stiefsohn worked for the 1st Aviation Regiment of the Theresian Military Academy and was one of the earliest aviators in Austria to practice gliding, even leading his own gliding school.

On August 3, 1936, during a gliding demonstration at the Germany Summer Olympics, the wing of Stiefsohn's glider broke. Unable to deploy his parachute in time, Stiefsohn died in the crash.
