= Levan Gureshidze =

Georgian luger (born 1988)

Levan Gureshidze (Georgian: ლევან გურეშიძე; born September 21, 1988) is a Georgian luger who has competed since 2008. He finished 55th in the 2008-09 Luge World Cup.

Gureshidze qualified for the 2010 Winter Olympics but withdrew from the competition after teammate Nodar Kumaritashvili died during a training run accident at the Olympics. He instead flew back to Georgia to mourn the loss of his teammate at Kumaritashvili's funeral.
