= Franz Weber (skier) =

Austrian alpine skier

Franz Weber (born October 3, 1956 in Innsbruck, Austria) is an Austrian skier and multiple world record holder in speed skiing.

== Life ==
Raised in Tirol, Franz Weber was the 1977 European Skateboard Champion, before changing his focus to speed skiing. From 1980 to 1985 he dominated this discipline and was six times world champion and held the world record; in 1985, he retired. He returned to the sport at the 1992 Winter Olympics in Albertville, France, in which speed skiing was featured as a demonstration sport. He came in 8th place overall, and set his personal best time of 222.222 km/h.

Weber now lives with his family on a ranch near Reno, and has been successful in sports marketing and as an event organizer.

== Achievements ==
- 1977 European Skateboard Championships - high jump record, winning
- 1980 World Speed Skiing Championships, Silverton, CO - winner
- 1981 World Speed Skiing Championships, Silverton, CO - winner
- 1982 Camel World Speed Skiing Championships, Silverton, CO - World Record: 203.16 km / h, Winner
- 1983 Camel World Speed Skiing Championships, Silverton, CO - World Record: 208.092 km / h, Winner
- 1984 Ford World Speed Skiing Championships, Les Arcs, France - two world records:
  - Special equipment 208.937 km/h;
  - Series equipment 182.186 km/h, winner
- Four world records (1982, 1983 and twice in 1984)
