= Ivan Papukchiev =

Bulgarian luger (born 1986)

Ivan Papukchiev (Bulgarian: Иван Папукчиев, born 9 July 1986) is a Bulgarian luger who has competed since 2004. He finished 38th in the men's singles event at the FIL World Luge Championships 2009 in Lake Placid, New York.

Papukchiev also finished 30th in the men's singles event at the FIL European Luge Championships 2010 in Sigulda.

He qualified for the 2010 Winter Olympics where he finished 37th in the men's singles event.
