= Lee Yong (luger) =

South Korean luger (born 1978)

- Hangul: 이용
- RR: I Yong
- MR: I Yong

Lee Yong (Korean: 이용; born June 23, 1978) is a South Korean luger who has competed since 1997. He finished 43rd in the men's singles event at the FIL World Luge Championships 2007 in Igls. Lee qualified for the 2010 Winter Olympics, finishing 36th in the men's singles event.
