= Philippe Goitschel =

French speed skier (born 1962)

Medal record

Representing France

Men's speed skiing

Winter Olympic Games
Silver medal – second place	1992 Albertville	Speed skiing

Philippe Goitschel (born 1962) is a French skier. He won a silver medal in speed skiing, a demonstration sport at the 1992 Winter Olympics in Albertville, France.

He is the nephew of champion skiers of the 1960s, Christine and Marielle Goitschel, sisters of his mother Patricia.

He achieved a world record for speed skiing, achieving a speed of 250.7 km/h (155.434 mph) at Les Arcs on April 23, 2002. After breaking the record, Goitschel announced his retirement from competitive skiing.
