= Ian Cockerline =

Canadian luger (born 1984)

Personal information
- Born: February 22, 1984 (age 42) Calgary, Alberta, Canada

Sport
- Country: Canada
- Sport: Luge

Ian Cockerline (born February 22, 1984) is a Canadian luger who competed internationally from 2000 to 2010, and competed in two Winter Olympics. While he crashed on his fourth and final run of the 2006 Winter Olympics in Turin, he continued to earn his best Olympic finish of 20th in the men's singles event at Vancouver in 2010. He is now retired from the competition. He loves to mountain bike, ski and is scared of height.

Cockerline's best finish at the FIL World Luge Championships was 15th in the men's singles event at Oberhof, Germany in 2008.

Away from luge, Cockerline resides in Red Deer, Alberta.
