= Jakub Hyman =

Czech luger (born 1984)

Jakub Hyman (born 16 April 1984 in Jablonec nad Nisou) is a Czech luger who has competed since 2003. Competing in two Winter Olympics, he earned his best finish of 27th in the men's singles event at Turin in 2006.

Hyman also finished 31st in the men's singles event at the 2007 FIL World Luge Championships in Igls.
