= Domen Pociecha =

Slovenian luger (born 1985)

Domen Pociecha (born 21 October 1985 in Kisovec) is a Slovenian luger who has competed since 1998. Competing in two Winter Olympics, he earned his best finish of 26th in the men's singles event at Turin in 2006.

Pociecha's best finish at the FIL World Luge Championships was 31st in the men's singles event at Oberhof in 2008. His best finish at the FIL European Luge Championships was 27th twice in the men's singles event, in 2006 and 2010.
