= Udo Gurgel =

German engineer

Udo Gurgel (born 1938 in Schwerin, Germany) is a German engineer and designer of luge, bobsled and skeleton tracks.

== Life ==
Gurgel studied structural engineering at the School of Civil Engineering in Cottbus until 1963 and then at the Bauhaus University, Weimar. He then worked as an engineer on the team commissioned with the planning of a track for Oberhof, Germany in 1966: the Oberhof bobsleigh, luge, and skeleton track. Since then, he has designed and constructed bobsleigh and toboggan runs.

In 1968, the Scientific and Technical Centre for sports facilities (STC sports facilities) in Leipzig, commissioned the first bobsleigh and luge track to be built in East Germany, following the first permanent track in West Germany: the Königssee bobsleigh, luge, and skeleton track. Since Gurgel and his colleagues had no insight into the detailed planning of the Königssee track - i.e. because the countries were rivals because of the cold war - many technical solutions had to be rethought. Thus they developed the use of no wood for shuttering the curve geometry, the STC and the contractor Ulrich Müther together made a concrete formwork free injection method, which is still used in railway construction. In addition, use was made for the first time of calculations by a mainframe computer. The luge track in Oberhof was the first fully computer calculated path in the world.

The development of the luge and bobsleigh meant that from 1982-86 a second track in the Erzgebirge Altenberg was constructed. It was commissioned by the then Ministry for State Security which demanded secrecy, thus preventing successful teamwork which had a negative impact on construction, so that the track had to be rebuilt after a testing season. After this setback, engineers specialized more in design, planning and calculation and developed their own software, so that Gurgel's engineering firm is today a leader in the planning of bobsled and luge tracks around the world.

After German reunification, Gurgel became independent and in 1993 founded an engineering office in order to implement the long-term experience of STC sports facilities. Today the engineering firm is called Gurgel + Partner Leipzig with Mike Richter and Jörg Penseler. Gurgel is officially active only as a consultant.

Gurgel has lived in Leipzig since 1966.

== Buildings (with the planning periods) ==
- 1968-1970: combined bob and luge track in Oberhof (first fully calculated on the computer, artificially cooled bobsleigh and toboggan run in the world)
- 1980, 1982-1986, 2007: combined bob and luge track in Altenberg and their reconstruction (considered as the most difficult track in the world)
- 1982-1985: toboggan run Sigulda, Latvia
- 1984-1986: combined bobsled and luge track for the 1988 Winter Olympics in Calgary, Canada
- 1989-1991: combined bobsled and luge track for the 1994 Winter Olympics in Lillehammer, Norway
- 1993-1995: combined bobsled and luge track for the 1998 Winter Olympics in Nagano, Japan
- 1992, 1996-1998: combined bobsled and luge track for the 2002 Winter Olympics in Park City, United States (Draft 1500 meter track and rescheduling, the curtailment)
- 2003-2004: combined bobsled and luge track for the 2006 Winter Olympic Games in Cesana, Italy
- 2004-2006: combined bob and luge track for the 2010 Winter Olympics in Whistler-Blackcomb in Vancouver, Canada
- 2009-2010: combined bobsled and luge track for the 2014 Winter Olympics in Krasnaya Polyana in Sochi, Russia (homologation in March 2012)
