= Peter Iliev =

Bulgarian luger (born 1984)

Peter Iliev (Bulgarian: Петър Илиев; born June 11, 1984) is a Bulgarian luger who has competed since 2000. Competing in two Winter Olympics, he earned his best finish of 31st in the men's singles event at Turin in 2006.

Iliev also finished 41st in the men's singles event at the 2007 FIL World Luge Championships in Igls.
