= Nicolas Bochatay =

Swiss alpine skier (1964–1992)

Nicolas Bochatay (August 27, 1964 – February 22, 1992) was a Swiss speed skier who died during the 1992 Winter Olympics. Bochatay was killed when he collided with a snow grooming vehicle on the morning of the speed skiing finals. He was the nephew of Olympic skier Fernande Bochatay.

== Personal life ==
Bochatay, a carpenter, was twenty-seven years of age at the time of the accident. He was married and had two children. Fernande Bochatay, Nicolas' aunt, won the bronze medal in the women's giant slalom during the 1968 Winter Olympics held in Grenoble, France.

== Skiing ==
The 1991 Swiss Champion, Bochatay was among the best speed skiers. Speed skiing is a dramatic sport, with competitors flying down the slope at 195 kilometres per hour (121 mph). At Les Arcs, during the Albertville Games in 1992, Bochatay placed 13th in the men's race with a speed of 210 km/h (130 mph).

== Accident and death ==
Around 9:30 am on February 22, the next-to-last day of competition at the 1992 Winter Olympics and morning of the speed-skiing final, Bochatay was warming up with teammate Pierre-Yves Jorand and American skiers Jeff Hamilton, Jimbo Morgan, and Dale Womack, when he crashed into a Snowcat used to groom snow on a public slope. The group was skiing and catching air on a bump in the slope. The group had made other runs on the trail. Bochatay was airborne before landing immediately in front of the groomer. He died of internal injuries immediately after impact.

Speed skiing was a demonstration sport at the 1992 Games, thus Bochatay's death was not considered as part of the official competition. Bochatay was the third athlete to die at a Winter Olympics, after British luger Kazimierz Kay-Skrzypeski and Australian skier Ross Milne, who both died at Innsbruck 1964.
