= 2023–24 in skiing =

This topic lists the snow ski sports for the 2023–24 season.

== Alpine skiing ==
=== World & Olympic Championships ===
- January 21–26: 2024 Winter Youth Olympics in (South Korea) Gangwon
  - Super-G winners: (Germany) Benno Brandis (m) / (Italy) Camilla Vanni (w)
  - Combined winners: (United Kingdom) Zak Carrick-Smith (m) / (Austria) Maja Waroschitz (w)
  - Giant slalom winners: (France) Nash Hout-Marchand (m) / (Italy) Giorgia Collomb (w)
  - Slalom winners: (United Kingdom) Zak Carrick-Smith (m) / (Austria) Maja Waroschitz (w)
  - Mixed Team winners: Austria
- January 28–February 3: 2024 World Junior Alpine Skiing Championships in (France) Haute Savoie
  - Downhill winners: (Switzerland) Livio Hiltbrand (m) / (Austria) Victoria Olivier (w)
  - Super-G winners: (Italy) Max Perathoner (m) / (Switzerland) Malorie Blanc (w)
  - Giant slalom winners: (United States) Ryder Sarchett (m) / (Canada) Britt Richardson (f)
  - Slalom winners: (Switzerland) Lenz Haechler (m) / (Latvia) Dženifera Ģērmane (f)
  - Team Combined winners: Italy (m) / Switzerland (f)
  - Team Parallel winner: Norway

=== 2023–24 FIS Alpine Ski World Cup ===
- October 28 – 29, 2023: WC #1 in (Austria) Sölden
  - Women's Giant slalom winner: (Switzerland) Lara Gut-Behrami
  - Men's Giant slalom was cancelled.
- November 8 – 12, 2023: WC #2 in (Switzerland) Zermatt-Cervinia
  - Event was cancelled.
- November 11 – 12, 2023: WC #3 in (Finland) Levi
  - Women's Slalom winners: (Slovakia) Petra Vlhová (#1) / (United States) Mikaela Shiffrin (#2)
- November 15 – 19, 2023: WC #4 in (Italy) Zermatt-Cervinia
  - Event was cancelled.
- November 18, 2023: WC #5 in (Austria) Gurgl
  - Men's Slalom winner: (Austria) Manuel Feller
- November 25 – 26, 2023: WC #6 in (United States) Killington
  - Women's Giant slalom winner: (Switzerland) Lara Gut-Behrami
  - Women's Slalom winner: (United States) Mikaela Shiffrin
- November 28 – December 3, 2023: WC #7 in (United States) Beaver Creek
  - Event was cancelled.
- December 2 – 3, 2023: WC #8 in (Canada) Tremblant
  - Women's Giant slalom winners: (Italy) Federica Brignone (2 times)
- December 6 – 10, 2023: WC #9 in (Switzerland) St. Moritz
  - Women's Super-G winner: (Italy) Sofia Goggia
  - Women's Downhill winner: (United States) Mikaela Shiffrin
  - Second Women's Super-G was cancelled.
- December 9 – 10, 2023: WC #10 in (France) Val d'Isere
  - Men's Giant slalom winner: (Switzerland) Marco Odermatt
  - Men's Slalom was cancelled
- December 12 – 16, 2023: WC #11 in (Italy) Val Gardena
  - Men's Downhill winners: (United States) Bryce Bennett (#1) / (Italy) Dominik Paris (#2)
  - Men's Super-G winner: (Austria) Vincent Kriechmayr
- December 14 – 17, 2023: WC #12 in (France) Val d'Isere
  - Women's Downhill winner: (Switzerland) Jasmine Flury
  - Women's Super-G winner: (Italy) Federica Brignone
- December 17 – 18, 2023: WC #13 in (Italy) Alta Badia
  - Men's Giant slalom winners: (Switzerland) Marco Odermatt (2 times)
- December 21, 2023: WC #14 in (France) Courchevel
  - Women's Slalom winner: (Slovakia) Petra Vlhová
- December 22, 2023: WC #15 in (Italy) Madonna di Campiglio
  - Men's Slalom winner: (Austria) Marco Schwarz
- December 26 – 29, 2023: WC #16 in (Italy) Bormio
  - Men's Downhill winner: (France) Cyprien Sarrazin
  - Men's Super-G winner: (Switzerland) Marco Odermatt
- December 28 – 29, 2023: WC #17 in (Austria) Lienz
  - Women's Giant slalom winner: (United States) Mikaela Shiffrin
  - Women's Slalom winner: (United States) Mikaela Shiffrin
- January 6 – 7: WC #18 in (Slovenia) Kranjska Gora
  - Women's Giant slalom winner: (Canada) Valérie Grenier
  - Women's Slalom winner: (Slovakia) Petra Vlhová
- January 6 – 7: WC #19 in (Switzerland) Adelboden
  - Men's Giant slalom winner: (Switzerland) Marco Odermatt
  - Men's Slalom winner: (Austria) Manuel Feller
- January 9 – 14: WC #20 in (Switzerland) Wengen
  - Men's Downhill winners: (Switzerland) Marco Odermatt (2 times)
  - Men's Super-G winner: (France) Cyprien Sarrazin
  - Men's Slalom winner: (Austria) Manuel Feller
- January 11 – 14: WC #21 in (Austria) Altenmarkt-Zauchensee
  - Women's Super-G winners: (Austria) Cornelia Hütter (#1) / (Switzerland) Lara Gut-Behrami (#2)
  - Women's Downhill winner: (Italy) Sofia Goggia
- January 16: WC #22 in (Austria) Flachau
  - Women's Slalom winner: (United States) Mikaela Shiffrin
- January 16 – 21: WC #23 in (Austria) Kitzbühel
  - Men's Downhill winners: (France) Cyprien Sarrazin (2 times)
  - Men's Slalom winner: (Germany) Linus Straßer
- January 20 – 21: WC #24 in (Slovakia) Jasná
  - Women's Giant slalom winner: (Sweden) Sara Hector
  - Women's Slalom winner: (United States) Mikaela Shiffrin
- January 23 – 24: WC #25 in (Austria) Schladming
  - Men's Giant slalom winner: (Switzerland) Marco Odermatt
  - Men's Slalom winner: (Germany) Linus Straßer
- January 24 – 28: WC #26 in (Italy) Cortina d'Ampezzo
  - Women's Downhill winners: (Austria) Stephanie Venier (#1)/ (Norway) Ragnhild Mowinckel (#2)
  - Women's Super-G winner: (Switzerland) Lara Gut-Behrami
- January 27 – 28: WC #27 in (Germany) Garmisch-Partenkirchen
  - Men's Super-G winner: (France) Nils Allègre (#1)/ (Switzerland) Marco Odermatt (#2)
- January 30: WC #28 in (Italy) Kronplatz
  - Women's Giant slalom winner: (Switzerland) Lara Gut-Behrami
- January 31 – February 4: WC #29 in (France) Chamonix
  - Men's two Downhill races were cancelled
  - Men's Slalom winner: (Switzerland) Daniel Yule
- February 1 – 4: WC #30 in (Germany) Garmisch-Partenkirchen
  - Event was cancelled
- February 10 – 11: WC #31 in (Bulgaria) Bansko
  - Men's Giant slalom winner: (Switzerland) Marco Odermatt
  - Men's Slalom was cancelled
- February 10 – 11: WC #32 in (Andorra) Soldeu
  - Stephanie Venier Giant slalom winner: (Switzerland) Lara Gut-Behrami
  - Women's Slalom winner: (Sweden) Anna Swenn-Larsson
- February 14 – 18: WC #33 in (Switzerland) Crans Montana
  - Women's Downhill winners: (Switzerland) Lara Gut-Behrami (#1) / (Italy) Marta Bassino (#2)
  - Women's Super-G winner: (Austria) Stephanie Venier
- February 15 – 18: WC #34 in (Norway) Kvitfjell
  - Men's Downhill winner: (Switzerland) Niels Hintermann
  - Men's Super-G winner: (Austria) Vincent Kriechmayr
- February 24 – 25: WC #35 in (Italy) Val di Fassa
  - Event was cancelled
- February 24 – 25: WC #36 in (United States) Palisades Tahoe
  - Men's Giant slalom winner: (Switzerland) Marco Odermatt
  - Men's Slalom winner: (Austria) Manuel Feller
- February 29 – March 3: WC #37 in (Norway) Kvitfjell
  - Women's Super-G winners: (Switzerland) Lara Gut-Behrami (#1) / (Italy) Federica Brignone (#2)
- March 1 – 3: WC #38 in (United States) Aspen
  - Men's Giant slalom winners: (Switzerland) Marco Odermatt (2 times)
  - Men's Slalom winner: (Switzerland) Loïc Meillard
- March 9 – 10: WC #39 in (Sweden) Åre
  - Women's Giant slalom winner: (Italy) Federica Brignone
  - Women's Slalom winner: (United States) Mikaela Shiffrin
- March 9 – 10: WC #40 in (Slovenia) Kranjska Gora
  - Event was cancelled.
- March 16 – 24: WC #41 in (Austria) Saalbach
  - Giant slalom winners: (Switzerland) Loïc Meillard (m) / (Italy) Federica Brignone (f)
  - Slalom winners: (Norway) Timon Haugan (m) / (United States) Mikaela Shiffrin (f)
  - Super-G winners: (Switzerland) Stefan Rogentin (m) / (Czech Republic) Ester Ledecká (f)
  - Downhill winners: Men's event was cancelled / (Austria) Cornelia Hütter (f)
- Overall winners: (Switzerland) Marco Odermatt (m) / (Switzerland) Lara Gut-Behrami (f)

=== 2023–24 FIS Alpine Skiing Continental Cup ===
==== 2023 FIS Alpine Skiing Australian and New Zealand Cup ====
- August 26 – September 2, 2023: ANC #1 at the (New Zealand) Coronet Peak
  - Here, the Super G events are cancelled.
  - Men's Giant Slalom winners: (Denmark) Christian Borgnaes (#1st) / (Switzerland) Fadri Janutin (#2nd)
  - Women's Giant Slalom winners: (United States) AJ Hurt (#1st) / (United States) Ava Sunshine (#2nd)
  - Men's Slalom winners: (United States) Jimmy Krupka (#1st) / (United Kingdom) Laurie Taylor (#2nd)
  - Women's Slalom winners: (United States) AJ Hurt (#1st) / (Austria) Nina Astner (#2nd)
- September 4 – 7, 2023: ANC #2 at the (Australia) Mount Hotham
  - Event is cancelled.

==== 2023–24 FIS Alpine Ski Europa Cup ====
- December 5 – 8, 2023: EC #1 at the (Switzerland) Zinal
  - One of the Women's Giant Slalom events was cancelled
  - Men's Giant Slalom winner: (France) Léo Anguenot
  - Women's Giant Slalom winner: (Switzerland) Nina Astner
- December 9 – 10, 2023: EC #2 at the (Austria) Mayrhofen
  - Women's Giant Slalom winner: (Sweden) Liv Ceder
  - Women's Slalom winner: (Italy) Lara Della Mea
- December 11 – 15, 2023: EC #3 at the (Italy) Santa Caterina
  - Men's Downhill winners: (Austria) Vincent Wieser (#1) / (Austria) Stefan Rieser (#2)
- December 12 – 13, 2023: EC #4 at the (Switzerland) St. Moritz
  - One of the Women's Super-G events was cancelled
  - Women's Super-G winner: (Austria) Lisa Grill
- December 15 – 16, 2023: EC #5 at the (Italy) Ahrntal
  - Women's Slalom winners: (Switzerland) Nicole Good (#1) / (France) Doriane Escané (#2)
- December 17, 2023: EC #6 at the (Italy) Val di Fassa
  - Men's Slalom winner: (France) Steven Amiez
- December 18 – 22, 2023: EC #7 at the (Italy) Passo San Pellegrino
  - Women's Super-G event was cancelled
  - Women's Downhill winners: (Austria) Lisa Grill (#1) (2 times)
- December 19, 2023: EC #8 at the (Italy) Obereggen
  - Men's Slalom winner: (Switzerland) Reto Schmidiger
- December 21 – 22, 2023: EC #9 at the (France) Valloire
  - Men's Giant Slalom winners: (Denmark) Christian Borgnaes (#1) / (France) Léo Anguenot (#2)
- January 8 – 9: EC #10 at the (Italy) Sestriere
  - Women's Giant Slalom winners: (France) Doriane Escané (2 times)
- January 8 – 12: EC #11 at the (Austria) Saalbach
  - Men's Super-G winners: (France) Florian Loriot (#1) / (Austria) Felix Hacker (#2)
  - Two Men's Downhill events were cancelled
- January 12 – 13: EC #12 at the (Austria) Zell am See
  - Women's Slalom winners: (Latvia) Dženifera Ģērmane (2 times)
- January 13 – 14: EC #13 at the (Germany) Berchtesgaden
  - Men's Slalom winners: (Norway) Eirik Hystad Solberg (#1) / (Switzerland) Fadri Janutin (#2)
- January 15 – 18: EC #14 at the (Austria) St. Anton
  - Two Women's Downhill events were cancelled
- January 17 – 18: EC #15 at the (France) Val Cenis
  - Men's Giant Slalom winner: (Germany) Fabian Gratz
  - One of the Men's Giant Slalom events was cancelled
- January 21 – 25: EC #16 at the (France) Orcières-Merlette
  - Women's Giant Slalom winners: (Austria) Emily Schöpf (2 times)
  - Women's Super-G winner: (Italy) Vicky Bernardi
- January 22 – 26: EC #17 at the (Italy) Tarvisio
  - Men's Super-G winner: (Austria) Vincent Wieser
  - Men's Downhill winners: (Switzerland) Lars Rösti (#1) / (Italy) Nicolò Molteni (#2)
- February 5 – 6: EC #18 at the (Switzerland) Gstaad
  - Men's Slalom winners: (Sweden) Fabian Ax Swartz (#1) / (Norway) Theodor Brækken (#2)
- February 5 – 6: EC #19 at the (Italy) La Thuile
  - Women's Super-G winners: (Italy) Teresa Runggaldier (#1) / (France) Karen Clement (#2)
- February 8 – 11: EC #20 at the (Switzerland) Crans Montana
  - Women's Downhill winners: (France) Karen Clement (#1) / (Bosnia and Herzegovina) Elvedina Muzaferija (#2)
- February 21 – 22: EC #21 at the (Italy) Sella Nevea
  - Men's Super-G winners: (France) Florian Loriot (2 times)
- February 21 – 22: EC #22 at the (Liechtenstein) Malbun
  - Women's Slalom winners: (Croatia) Leona Popović (#1) / (Sweden) Hanna Aronsson Elfman (#2)
- February 24 – 25: EC #23 at the (Germany) Oberjoch
  - Event was cancelled
- February 26 – 27: EC #24 at the (Austria) Pass Thurn
  - Men's Giant Slalom winners: (Austria) Noel Zwischenbrugger (#1) / (Norway) Jesper Wahlqvist (#2)
- February 29 – March 1: EC #25 at the (Switzerland) Stoos
  - Event was cancelled
- February 29 – March 1: EC #26 at the (Italy) Sarntal
  - Women's Super G winner: (Italy) Asja Zenere
- March 4 – 8: EC #27 at the (Switzerland) Verbier
  - Men's Downhill winners: (Austria) Manuel Traninger (#1) / (Switzerland) Lars Rösti (#2)
  - Men's Super G winner: (Switzerland) Arnaud Boisset
- March 10 – 11: EC #28 at the (Sweden) Klaeppen
  - Men's Slalom winners: (Finland) Eduard Hallberg (#1) / (Norway) Theodor Brækken (#2)
- March 10 – 11: EC #29 at the (Norway) Ål
  - Women's Giant Slalom winners: (Italy) Ilaria Ghisalberti (#1) / (France) Karen Clement (#2)
- March 13 – 14: EC #30 at the (Norway) Norefjell
  - Women's Slalom winners: (Sweden) Hanna Aronsson Elfman (#1) / (Italy) Emilia Mondinelli (#2)
- March 13 – 14: EC #31 at the (Norway) Trysil
  - Men's Giant Slalom winners: (Norway) Jesper Wahlqvist (#1) / (France) Diego Orecchioni (#2)
- March 16 – 18: EC #32 at the (Norway) Hafjell
  - Giant Slalom winners: (France) Diego Orecchioni (m) / (Norway) Marte Monsen (f)
  - Slalom winners: (Finland) Eduard Hallberg (m) / (Switzerland) Elena Stoffel (f)
- March 19 – 22: EC #33 at the (Norway) Kvitfjell
  - Downhill winners: (Switzerland) Livio Hiltbrand (m) / (Italy) Nadia Delago (f)
  - Super G winners: (Germany) Jacob Schramm & (Italy) Nicolò Molteni (m) / (France) Tiffany Roux (f)

==== 2023–24 FIS Alpine Skiing Far East Cup ====
- December 5 – 8, 2023: FEC #1 at the (China) Wanglong Ski Resort
  - Men's Giant Slalom winners: (South Korea) Jung Dong-hyun (2 times)
  - Women's Giant Slalom winners: (Japan) Mikoto Onishi (#1) / (Japan) Ayano Yokoo (#2)
  - Men's Slalom winners: (South Korea) Jung Dong-hyun (2 times)
  - Women's Slalom winners: (Japan) Eren Watanabe (#1) / (New Zealand) Mikayla Smyth (#2)
- January 4 – 11: FEC #2 at the (China) Yanqing
  - Men's Downhill winners: (China) Xu Mingfu (2 times)
  - Women's Downhill winners: (Japan) Hinata Fukasawa (2 times)
  - Men's Super-G winners: (Japan) Yusaku Naoe (#1) / (Japan) Jinro Kirikubo (#2)
  - Women's Super-G winners: (Japan) Mikoto Onishi (2 times)
- February 1 – 2: FEC #3 at the (South Korea) Yong pyong
  - Men's Slalom winners: (Japan) Takayuki Koyama (#1) / (Poland) Michał Jasiczek (#2)
  - Women's Slalom winners: (South Korea) Gim So-hui (#1) / (Japan) Chisaki Maeda (#2)
- February 5 – 8: FEC #4 at the (South Korea) Yong pyong
  - Men's Slalom winners: (Japan) Takayuki Koyama (#1) / (Poland) Piotr Habdas (#2)
  - Women's Slalom winners: (Japan) Eren Watanabe (2 times)
- February 28 – March 1: FEC #5 at the (Japan) Sugadairakohgen
  - Men's Slalom winners: (Japan) Yohei Koyama (2 times)
  - Women's Slalom winners: (South Korea) Gim So-hui (#1) / (New Zealand) Mikayla Smyth (#2)
  - Giant Slalom winners: (Austria) Ralph Seidler (m) / (Japan) Shizuku Hirota (w)

==== 2023–24 FIS Alpine Skiing Nor-Am Cup ====
- December 4 – 9, 2023: NAC #1 at the (United States) Copper Mountain
  - Men's Downhill winners: (Canada) Kyle Alexander (2 times)
  - Men's Super-G winners: (Canada) Cameron Alexander (2 times)
  - Women's Downhill winners: (United States) Haley Cutler (#1) / (United States) Allison Mollin (#2)
  - Women's Super-G winners: (United States) Allison Mollin (2 times)
- December 11 – 14, 2023: NAC #2 at the (United States) Beaver Creek Resort
  - Men's Giant Slalom winners: (Canada) Simon Fournier (#1) / (United States) Bridger Gile (#2)
  - Men's Slalom winners: (United States) Cooper Puckett (#1) / (Canada) Simon Fournier (#2)
- December 13 – 16, 2023: NAC #3 at the (Canada) Mont-Tremblant
  - Women's Giant Slalom winners: (Poland) Magdalena Łuczak (2 times)
  - Women's Slalom winners: (United States) AJ Hurt (2 times)
- January 2 – 5: NAC #4 at the (United States) Stratton Mountain Resort
  - Women's Giant Slalom winners: (Sweden) Sara Rask (#1) / (Canada) Arianne Forget (#2)
  - Women's Slalom winners: (United Kingdom) Victoria Palla (2 times)
- January 2 – 5: NAC #5 at the (United States) Burke Mountain
  - Men's Giant Slalom winners: (Switzerland) Sandro Zurbrügg (2 times)
  - Men's Slalom winners: (Croatia) Matej Vidović (#1) / (United States) Camden Palmquist (#2)
- February 22 – 23: NAC #6 at the (United States) Whiteface
  - Men's Super G winners: (Canada) Kyle Alexander (#1) / (Canada) Riley Seger (#2)
  - Women's Super G winners: (United States) Mary Bocock (#1) / (United States) Tatum Grosdidier (#2)
- February 24 – 25: NAC #7 at the (Canada) Devils Glen
  - Women's Slalom winners: (United Kingdom) Victoria Palla (#1) / (Canada) Arianne Forget (#2)
- February 26 – 27: NAC #8 at the (Canada) Georgian Peaks
  - Women's Giant slalom winner: (Canada) Arianne Forget
- February 26 – 29: NAC #9 at the (Canada) Mont Ste-Marie
  - Men's Giant slalom winners: (Sweden) Isac Hedstroem (#1) / (Estonia) Tormis Laine (#2)
  - Men's Slalom winner: (Canada) Declan McCormack
- April 1 – 11: NAC #10 at the (Canada) Panorama Resort

==== 2023–24 FIS Alpine Skiing South American Cup ====
- August 4 – 6, 2023: SAC #1 at the (Argentina) Chapelco
  - Men's Giant Slalom winners: (Chile) Kay Holscher (2 times)
  - Women's Giant Slalom winners: (United Kingdom) Giselle Gorringe (#1) / (Switzerland) Leandra Zehnder (#2)
- August 7 – 12, 2023: SAC #2 at the (Argentina) Cerro Catedral
  - Men's Slalom winners: (Argentina) Tomás Birkner de Miguel (#1) / (Italy) Gabriele Sartori (#2)
  - Women's Slalom winner: (United Kingdom) Giselle Gorringe (2 times)
- August 21 – 24, 2023: SAC #3 at the (Argentina) Las Leñas
  - Event cancelled due lack of snow.
- August 25 – 27, 2023: SAC #4 at the (Argentina) Cerro Catedral
  - Slalom winners: (Sweden) Philip Lundquist (m) / (Belgium) Kim Vanreusel (f)
  - Giant slalom winners: (Chile) Kay Holscher (m) / (France) Laurine Lugon-Moulin (f)
- August 28 – September 1, 2023: SAC #5 at the (Chile) La Parva
  - Here, Super G events are cancelled.
  - Men's Downhill winners: (Slovenia) Nejc Naraločnik (#1) / (Chile) Henrik Von Appen (#2nd)
  - Women's Downhill winners: (Canada) Britt Richardson (#1) / (France) Léna Dauphin (#2nd)
- September 2, 2023: SAC #6 at the (Chile) El Colorado
  - Event is cancelled.
- September 3, 2023: SAC #7 at the (Chile) La Parva
  - Slalom winners: (Sweden) Philip Lundquist (m) / (Italy) Maria Sole Antonini (f)
- September 11–14, 2023: SAC #8 at the (Argentina) Cerro Castor
  - Men's Giant Slalom winner: (Sweden) William Hansson (2 times)
  - Women's Giant Slalom winners: (Austria) Julia Scheib (#1) / (Switzerland) Simone Wild (#2nd)
  - Men's Slalom winners: (Austria) Joshua Sturm (#1) / (France) Paco Rassat (#2nd)
  - Women's Slalom winners: (Sweden) Moa Boström Müssener (#1) / (Italy) Beatrice Sola (#2nd)
- September 23 – 28, 2023: SAC #9 at the (Chile) Ski resort Corralco
  - Men's Downhill winner: (United States) Wiley Maple (2 times)
  - Women's Downhill winners: (Canada) Stefanie Fleckenstein (#1) / (Chile) Matilde Schwencke (#2nd)
  - Men's Super G winners: (United States) Wiley Maple (#1) / (United States) Tristan Lane (#2nd)
  - Women's Super G winner: (Canada) Stefanie Fleckenstein (2 times)
  - Here, the Alpine Combined competitions are cancelled.

=== Other Events ===
- March 9–10: 32nd Asian Alpine Ski Championships (Junior) in (China) Beidahu Ski Resort
  - Giant slalom winners: (Uzbekistan) Medet Nazarov (m) / (South Korea) Choi Ye-rin (f)
  - Slalom winners: (South Korea) Yu Si-wan (m) / (South Korea) Choi Ye-rin (f)
- March 21: Zoll Skimeisterschaften 2024 in (Germany) Garmisch-Partenkichen
  - Event was cancelled

=== 2023–24 Alpine Skiing FIS Events ===
- For Full 2023-24 Alpine Skiing FIS Events Calendar here.

=== 2023–24 Alpine Skiing National Championships ===
- For Full 2023-24 Alpine Skiing National Championships Calendar here.

=== 2023–24 Alpine Skiing National Junior Championships ===
- For Full 2023-24 Alpine Skiing National Junior Championships Calendar here.

=== 2023–24 Alpine Skiing National Junior Races ===
- For Full 2023-24 Alpine Skiing National Junior Races Calendar here.

=== 2023–24 Alpine Skiing CIT Events ===
- For Full 2023-24 Alpine Skiing CIT Events Calendar here.

=== 2023–24 Alpine Skiing University Events ===
- For Full 2023-24 Alpine Skiing University Events Calendar here.

=== 2023–24 Alpine Skiing Entry League FIS Events ===
- For Full 2023-24 Alpine Skiing Entry League FIS Events Calendar here.

=== 2023–24 Alpine Skiing Children Events ===
- For Full 2023-24 Alpine Skiing Children Events Calendar here.

=== 2023–24 FIS Masters Cup & FIS World Criterium Masters ===
- For Full 2023-24 FIS Masters Cup Calendar here.

=== 2023–24 FIS Masters Events ===
- For Full 2023-24 FIS Masters Events Calendar here.

== Biathlon ==
- IBU Datacenter here.

=== World & Continental Championships ===
- August 21–27, 2023: Summer Biathlon World Championships 2023 in (Slovakia) Brezno-Osrblie
  - Super sprint winners: (Latvia) Andrejs Rastorgujevs (m) / (Germany) Marion Wiesensarter (w) / (Poland) Jan Guńka (mj) / (Bulgaria) Lora Hristova (wj)
  - Sprint winners: (Belgium) Florent Claude (m) / (Estonia) Tuuli Tomingas (w) / (Ukraine) Bohdan Borkovskyi (mj) / (Bulgaria) Lora Hristova (wj)
  - Pursuit winners: (Croatia) Matija Legović (mj) / (Bulgaria) Lora Hristova (wj)
  - Mass start winners: (Ukraine) Taras Lesiuk (m) / (Czech Republic) Markéta Davidová (w)
- January 20–24: 2024 Winter Youth Olympics in (South Korea) Gangwon
  - Sprint winners: (France) Antonin Guy (m) / (Italy) Carlotta Gautero (w)
  - Individual race winners: (France) Antonin Guy (m) / (Czech Republic) Ilona Plecháčová (w)
  - Mixed Relay winners: France (Single mixed) / Italy (Mixed)
- January 24–28: 2024 IBU Open European Championships in (Slovakia) Brezno-Osrblie
  - Individual race winners: (Norway) Vebjørn Sørum (m) / (Norway) Maren Kirkeeide (w)
  - Sprint winners: (France) Antonin Guigonnat (m) / (Norway) Ida Lien (w)
  - Pursuit winners: (Norway) Isak Frey (m) / (Norway) Maren Kirkeeide (w)
  - Mixed Relay winners: Sweden (Single mixed) / Norway (mixed)
- February 5–11: 2024 IBU Junior Open European Championships in (Poland) Jakuszyce
  - Individual race winners: (Mongolia) Enkhsaikhan Enkhbat (m) / (Austria) Anna Andexer (w)
  - Sprint winners: (Finland) Arttu Heikkinen (m) / (Austria) Lara Wagner (w)
  - Mass start winners: (Croatia) Matija Legović (m) / (Austria) Anna Andexer (w)
  - Mixed Relay Events were cancelled
- February 7–18: Biathlon World Championships 2024 in (Czech Republic) Nové Město na Moravě
  - Individual race winners: (Norway) Johannes Thingnes Bø (m) / (Italy) Lisa Vittozzi (w)
  - Sprint winners: (Norway) Sturla Holm Lægreid (m) / (France) Julia Simon (f)
  - Pursuit winners: (Norway) Johannes Thingnes Bø (m) / (France) Julia Simon (w)
  - Mass start winners: (Norway) Johannes Thingnes Bø (m) / (France) Justine Braisaz-Bouchet (w)
  - Relay winners: Sweden (m) / France (w)
  - Mixed relay winners: France (Single mixed) / France (Mixed)
- February 20 – March 2: Biathlon Junior World Championships 2024 in (Estonia) Otepää
  - Junior individual race winners: (Germany) Leonhard Pfund (m) / (Germany) Julia Tannheimer (w)
  - Junior sprint winners: (Norway) Isak Frey (m) / (Sweden) Sara Andersson (f)
  - Junior mass start 60 winners: (Norway) Sivert Gerhardsen (m) / (Germany) Julia Kink (w)
  - Junior relay winners: Norway (m) / Germany (w)
  - Junior mixed relay winners: Norway
  - Youth individual race winners: (France) Antonin Guy (m) / (Germany) Alma Siegismund (w)
  - Youth sprint winners: (Norway) Kasper Kalkenberg (m) / (Sweden) Elsa Tänglander (f)
  - Youth mass start 60 winners: (Norway) Kasper Kalkenberg (m) / (Ukraine) Oleksandra Merkushyna (w)
  - Youth relay winners: Norway (m) / Norway (w)
  - Youth mixed relay winners: France

=== 2023–24 Biathlon World Cup ===
- November 25 – December 3, 2023: WC #1 in Östersund
  - Individual winners: (Germany) Roman Rees (m) / (Italy) Lisa Vittozzi (f)
  - Sprint winners: (Germany) Philipp Nawrath (m) / (France) Lou Jeanmonnot (f)
  - Pursuit winners: (Sweden) Sebastian Samuelsson (m) / (France) Lou Jeanmonnot (f)
  - Relay winners: Norway (m) / Norway (f)
  - Mixed Relay winners: Sweden (6 km + 7.5 km) / France (4 x 6 km)
- December 8 – 10, 2023: WC #2 in (Austria) Hochfilzen
  - Sprint winners: (Norway) Tarjei Bø (m) / (Norway) Ingrid Landmark Tandrevold (f)
  - Pursuit winners: (Norway) Johannes Thingnes Bø (m) / (Sweden) Elvira Öberg (f)
  - Relay winners: Norway (m) / Norway (f)
- December 14 – 17, 2023: WC #3 in (Switzerland) Lenzerheide
  - Sprint winners: (Germany) Benedikt Doll (m) / (France) Justine Braisaz-Bouchet (f)
  - Pursuit winners: (Norway) Johannes Thingnes Bø (m) / (France) Justine Braisaz-Bouchet (f)
  - Mass start winners: (Norway) Johannes Thingnes Bø (m) / (France) Justine Braisaz-Bouchet (f)
- January 4–7: WC #4 in (Germany) Oberhof
  - Sprint winners: (Germany) Benedikt Doll (m) / (France) Justine Braisaz-Bouchet (f)
  - Pursuit winners: (Norway) Endre Strømsheim (m) / (France) Julia Simon (f)
  - Relay winners: Norway (m) / France (f)
- January 10–14: WC #5 in (Germany) Ruhpolding
  - Sprint winners: (Norway) Vetle Sjåstad Christiansen (m) / (Norway) Ingrid Landmark Tandrevold (f)
  - Pursuit winners: (Norway) Johannes Dale-Skjevdal (m) / (Italy) Lisa Vittozzi (f)
  - Relay winners: Norway (m) / France (f)
- January 18–21: WC #6 in (Italy) Antholz-Anterselva
  - Short Individual winners: (Norway) Johannes Thingnes Bø (m) / (Switzerland) Lena Häcki-Groß (f)
  - Mass start winners: (Norway) Vetle Sjåstad Christiansen (m) / (France) Julia Simon (f)
  - Mixed Relay winners: Germany (6 km + 7.5 km) / Norway (4 x 6 km)
- February 29 – March 3: WC #7 in Oslo Holmenkollen
  - Individual winners: (Norway) Sturla Holm Lægreid (m) / (Norway) Ingrid Landmark Tandrevold (f)
  - Mass start winners: (Norway) Sturla Holm Lægreid (m) / (Switzerland) Lena Häcki-Groß (f)
  - Mixed Relay winners: Norway (6 km + 7.5 km) / France (4 x 6 km)
- March 8–10: WC #8 in (United States) Soldier Hollow
  - Sprint winners: (France) Éric Perrot (m) / (France) Justine Braisaz-Bouchet (f)
  - Pursuit winners: (Norway) Johannes Thingnes Bø (m) / (France) Lou Jeanmonnot (f)
  - Relay winners: Norway (m) / Norway (f)
- March 14–17: WC #9 in (Canada) Canmore
  - Sprint winners: (Norway) Johannes Thingnes Bø (m) / (Italy) Lisa Vittozzi (f)
  - Pursuit winners: (Norway) Johannes Thingnes Bø (m) / (Italy) Lisa Vittozzi (f)
  - Mass start winners: (Norway) Johannes Thingnes Bø (m) / (France) Lou Jeanmonnot (f)
- Overall winners: (Norway) Johannes Thingnes Bø (m) / (Italy) Lisa Vittozzi (f)

=== 2023–24 Biathlon IBU Cup ===
- November 30 – December 3, 2023: IC #1 in (Finland) Kontiolahti
  - Individual winners: (Norway) Johan-Olav Botn (m) / (France) Jeanne Richard (f)
  - Sprint winners: (Norway) Johan-Olav Botn (m) / (Norway) Emilie Ågheim Kalkenberg (f)
  - Mixed Relay winners: Norway (6 km + 7.5 km) / Norway (4 x 6 km)
- December 8–10, 2023: IC #2 in (Sweden) Idre Fjäll
  - Sprint #1 winners: (Norway) Johan-Olav Botn (m) / (Germany) Johanna Puff (f)
  - Sprint #2 winners: (Germany) Philipp Horn (m) / (Norway) Karoline Erdal (f)
  - Pursuit winners: (Norway) Johan-Olav Botn (m) / (Norway) Jenny Enodd (f)
- December 13–16, 2023: IC #3 in (Norway) Sjusjøen
  - Sprint winners: (Germany) Simon Kaiser (m) / (France) Océane Michelon (f)
  - Pursuit winners: (Norway) Johan-Olav Botn (m) / (France) Anaelle Bondoux (f)
  - Mass start winners: (Norway) Martin Nevland (m) / (Germany) Julia Tannheimer (f)
- January 4–7: IC #4 in (Italy) Martell-Val Martello
  - Short individual winners: (Norway) Vebjørn Sørum (m) / (Germany) Julia Kink (f)
  - Sprint winners: (Norway) Isak Frey (m) / (Norway) Maren Kirkeeide (f)
  - Pursuit winners: (Norway) Isak Frey (m) / (France) Gilonne Guigonnat (f)
- January 10–13: IC #5 in (Italy) Ridnaun-Val Ridanna
  - Sprint winners: (Norway) Johan-Olav Botn (m) / (France) Gilonne Guigonnat (f)
  - Mass start winners: (Germany) Danilo Riethmüller (m) / (Germany) Johanna Puff (f)
  - Mixed Relay winners: Norway (6 km + 7.5 km) / Norway (4 x 6 km)
- February 1–3: IC #6 in (Germany) Arber
  - Sprint #1 winners: (Norway) Martin Uldal (m) / (Italy) Hannah Auchentaller (f)
  - Sprint #2 winners: (Norway) Johan-Olav Botn (m) / (Norway) Karoline Erdal (f)
- February 29 – March 3: IC #7 in (Austria) Obertilliach
  - Sprint winners: (Norway) Mats Øverby (m) / (Norway) Ragnhild Femsteinevik (f)
  - Pursuit winners: (Norway) Mats Øverby (m) / (Norway) Marthe Kråkstad Johansen (f)
- March 6–9: IC #8 in (Austria) Obertilliach
  - Short individual winners: (Norway) Mats Øverby (m) / (Germany) Lisa Maria Spark (f)
  - Sprint winners: (Norway) Martin Uldal (m) / (Germany) Stefanie Scherer (f)
  - Mass start winners: (Norway) Sverre Dahlen Aspenes (m) / (France) Anaëlle Bondoux (f)
- Overall winners: (Norway) Mats Øverby (m) / (France) Océane Michelon (f)

=== 2023–24 Biathlon IBU Junior Cup ===
- December 6–10, 2023: IJC #1 in (Slovenia) Pokljuka
  - Individual winners: (Italy) Nicolò Betemps (m) / (France) Fanny Bertrand (f)
  - Sprint winners: (Slovakia) Jakub Borgula (m) / (Austria) Anna Andexer (f)
- December 11–16, 2023: IJC #2 in (Italy) Ridnaun-Val Ridanna
  - Sprint #1 winners: (Croatia) Matija Legović (m) / (Austria) Anna Andexer (f)
  - Sprint #2 winners: (Germany) Leonhard Pfund (m) / (Austria) Anna Andexer (f)
  - Mixed Relay winners: Austria (6 km + 7.5 km) / Ukraine (4 x 6 km)
- January 30 – February 4: IJC #3 in (Poland) Jakuszyce
  - Individual winners: (Germany) Benjamin Menz (m) / (Germany) Alina Nußbicker (f)
  - Sprint #1 winners: (Estonia) Jakob Kublin (m) / (Austria) Anna Andexer (f)
  - Sprint #2 winners: (Austria) Lukas Haslinger (m) / (Austria) Anna Andexer (f)

== Cross-country skiing ==
=== World & Olympic Championships ===
- 29 January – 1 February: 2024 Winter Youth Olympics in (South Korea) Gangwon
  - Sprint free winners: (Italy) Federico Pozzi (m) / (Sweden) Elsa Tänglander (f)
  - 7.5 km classic winners: (Germany) Jakob Moch (m) / (Finland) Nelli-Lotta Karppelin (f)
  - Mixed relay: Germany
- February 5 – 11: 2024 Nordic Junior World Ski Championships in (Slovenia) Planica
  - Sprint Juniors winners: (Norway) Lars Heggen (m) / (Andorra) Gina del Rio (f)
  - Sprint U23 winners: (Norway) Aleksander Elde Holmboe (m) / (Canada) Sonjaa Schmidt (f)
  - 10 km classic Juniors winners: (Sweden) Alvar Myhlback (m) / (Sweden) Evelina Crüsell (f)
  - 10 km classic U23 winners: (Norway) Mathias Holbæk (m) / (Germany) Helen Hoffmann (f)
  - Mass start Juniors winners: (Norway) Jørgen Nordhagen (m) / (Italy) Maria Gismondi (f)
  - Mass start U23 winners: (France) Mathis Desloges (m) / (Switzerland) Marina Kälin (f)
  - Mixed Juniors relay: Sweden
  - Mixed U23 relay: Canada

=== 2023–24 FIS Cross-Country World Cup ===
- November 24–26, 2023: WC #1 in (Finland) Ruka
  - Sprint C winners: (Norway) Erik Valnes (m) / (Sweden) Emma Ribom (w)
  - 10 km C winners: (Norway) Martin Løwstrøm Nyenget (m) / (Sweden) Ebba Andersson (w)
  - 20 km F MSS winners: (Norway) Jan Thomas Jenssen (m) / (Sweden) Moa Ilar (w)
- December 2 & 3, 2023: WC #2 in Gällivare
  - 10 km F winners: (Norway) Pål Golberg (m) / (United States) Jessie Diggins (w)
  - Relay winners: Norway (m) / Sweden (w)
- December 9 & 10, 2023: WC #3 in (Sweden) Östersund
  - Sprint C winners: (Norway) Johannes Høsflot Klæbo (m) / (Sweden) Emma Ribom (w)
  - 10 km F winners: (Norway) Harald Østberg Amundsen (m) / (United States) Jessie Diggins (w)
- December 15–17, 2023: WC #4 in (Norway) Trondheim
  - Sprint F winners: (Norway) Johannes Høsflot Klæbo (m) / (Norway) Kristine Stavås Skistad (w)
  - 20 km skiathlon winners: (Norway) Johannes Høsflot Klæbo (m) / (Sweden) Ebba Andersson (w)
  - 10 km C winners: (Norway) Johannes Høsflot Klæbo (m) / (Germany) Victoria Carl (w)
- December 30, 2023 – January 1: WC #5 in (Italy) Toblach
  - Sprint F winners: (France) Lucas Chanavat (m) / (Sweden) Linn Svahn (w)
  - 10 km C winners: (Finland) Perttu Hyvärinen (m) / (Finland) Kerttu Niskanen (w)
  - 20 km F PUR winners: (Norway) Harald Østberg Amundsen (m) / (United States) Jessie Diggins (w)
- January 3 & 4: WC #6 in (Switzerland) Davos
  - Sprint F winners: (France) Lucas Chanavat (m) / (Sweden) Linn Svahn (w)
  - 20 km C PUR winners: (Norway) Harald Østberg Amundsen (m) / (Finland) Kerttu Niskanen (w)
- January 6 & 7: WC #7 in (Italy) Val di Fiemme
  - 15 km C MSS winners: (Norway) Erik Valnes (m) / (Sweden) Linn Svahn (w)
  - 10 km F MSS Climb winners: (France) Jules Lapierre (m) / (United States) Sophia Laukli (w)
- January 19–21: WC #8 in (Germany) Oberhof
  - Sprint C winners: (Norway) Erik Valnes (m) / (Sweden) Linn Svahn (w)
  - 20 km C MSS winners: (Norway) Erik Valnes (m) / (Sweden) Frida Karlsson (w)
  - Relay winners: Norway (m) / Sweden (w)
- January 26–28: WC #9 in (Switzerland) Goms
  - Sprint F winners: (Norway) Johannes Høsflot Klæbo (m) / (Sweden) Linn Svahn (w)
  - 20 km F MSS winners: (Norway) Johannes Høsflot Klæbo (m) / (United States) Jessie Diggins (w)
  - Mixed relay winners: Sweden
- February 9–13: WC #10 in (Canada) Canmore
  - 15 km F MSS winners: (Norway) Simen Hegstad Krüger (m) / (United States) Jessie Diggins (w)
  - Sprint F winners: (Norway) Johannes Høsflot Klæbo (m) / (Norway) Kristine Stavås Skistad (w)
  - 20 km C MSS winners: (Norway) Pål Golberg (m) / (Sweden) Frida Karlsson (w)
  - Sprint C winners: (Norway) Johannes Høsflot Klæbo (m) / (Sweden) Linn Svahn (w)
- February 17 & 18: WC #11 in (United States) Minneapolis
  - Sprint F winners: (Norway) Johannes Høsflot Klæbo (m) / (Sweden) Jonna Sundling (w)
  - 10 km F winners: (United States) Gus Schumacher (m) / (Sweden) Jonna Sundling (w)
- March 1–3: WC #12 in (Finland) Lahti
  - 20 km C winners: (Norway) Johannes Høsflot Klæbo (m) / (Finland) Krista Pärmäkoski (w)
  - Sprint F winners: (Norway) Johannes Høsflot Klæbo (m) / (Norway) Kristine Stavås Skistad (w)
  - Team sprint winners: Norway (m) / Sweden (w)
- March 9 & 10: WC #13 in (Norway) Oslo
  - 50 km C MSS winners: (Norway) Johannes Høsflot Klæbo (m) / (Sweden) Frida Karlsson (w)
- March 12: WC #14 in (Norway) Drammen
  - Sprint C winners: (Norway) Johannes Høsflot Klæbo (m) / (Norway) Kristine Stavås Skistad (w)
- March 15–17: WC #15 in (Sweden) Falun
  - Sprint C winners: (Norway) Johannes Høsflot Klæbo (m) / (Norway) Kristine Stavås Skistad (w)
  - 10 km C winners: (Norway) Johannes Høsflot Klæbo (m) / (United States) Jessie Diggins (w)
  - 20 km F MSS winners: (Norway) Johannes Høsflot Klæbo (m) / (United States) Jessie Diggins (w)
- Overall winners: (Norway) Harald Østberg Amundsen (m) / (United States) Jessie Diggins (f)

=== 2023–24 FIS Cross-Country Continental Cup ===
==== Australia/New Zealand Cup ====
- July 29 & 30, 2023: ANC #1 at the (Australia) Perisher Ski Resort
  - Sprint Classic winners: (Australia) Seve de Campo (m) / (Australia) Katerina Paul (f)
  - 15 km Individual Free winners: (Australia) Seve de Campo (m) / (Australia) Darcie Morton (f)
- August 19 & 20, 2023: ANC #2 at the (Australia) Falls Creek Alpine Resort
  - Sprint Classic winners: (Germany) Christian Winker (m) / (Australia) Darcie Morton (f)
  - 10 km Individual Free winners: (Germany) Christian Winker (m) / (Switzerland) Flavia Lindegger (f)

==== FIS Cross-country skiing South American Cup ====
- September 7 – 10, 2023: SAC #1 at the (Argentina) Cerro Catedral
  - Men's 10 km Individual Free winner: (Argentina) Franco Dal Farra
  - Women's 5 km Individual Free winner: (Argentina) Nahiara Díaz
  - Sprint Classic winners: (Argentina) Franco Dal Farra (m) / (Argentina) Nahiara Díaz (f)
- Here, Men's 10 km Individual Classic and Women's 5 km Individual Classic are cancelled.
- September 23 – 28, 2023: SAC #2 at the (Chile) Ski resort Corralco
  - Men's 10 km Individual Free winner: (Argentina) Franco Dal Farra
  - Women's 7.5 km Individual Free winner: (Argentina) Nahiara Díaz
  - Sprint Free winners: (Argentina) Franco Dal Farra (m) / (Argentina) Nahiara Díaz (f)

=== 2023–24 Cross-Country Skiing FIS Events ===
- For Full 2023-24 Cross-Country Skiing FIS Events Calendar here.

=== 2023–24 Cross-Country Skiing Junior Events ===
- For Full 2023-24 Cross-Country Skiing Junior Events Calendar here.

=== 2023–24 Cross-Country Skiing Masters Events ===
- For Full 2023-24 Cross-Country Skiing Masters Events Calendar here.

=== 2023–24 Cross-Country Skiing National Championships ===
- For Full 2023-24 Cross-Country Skiing National Championships Calendar here.

=== 2023–24 Cross-Country Skiing National Junior Championships ===
- For Full 2023-24 Cross-Country Skiing National Junior Championships Calendar here.

=== 2023–24 Cross-Country Skiing Popular Cross-Country Events ===
- For Full 2023-24 Cross-Country Skiing Popular Cross-Country Events Calendar here.

=== 2023–24 Cross-Country Skiing Children Events ===
- For Full 2023-24 Cross-Country Skiing Children Events Calendar here.

=== 2023–24 World Loppet Events ===
- For Full 2023-24 World Loppet Calendar here.

== Grass skiing ==
=== World Championships ===
- August 3–6, 2023: FIS Grass Skiing Junior World Championships 2023/2024 in (Austria) Rettenbach
  - Slalom winners: (Austria) Sebastian Posch (m) / (Austria) Tina Hetfleisch (f)
  - Giant Slalom winners: (Italy) Andrea Iori (m) / (Austria) Lara Teynor (f)
  - Super G winners: (Austria) Leopold Schoen (m) / (Austria) Emma Eberhardt (f)
  - Super Combined winners: (Austria) Leopold Schoen (m) / (Austria) Tina Hetfleisch (f)
- August 30 – 2 September 2023: FIS Grass Skiing World Championships 2023/2024 in (Italy) Cortina d'Ampezzo
  - Slalom winners: (Czech Republic) Martin Barták (m) / (Japan) Chisaki Maeda (f)
  - Giant Slalom winners: (Italy) Andrea Iori (m) / (Japan) Chisaki Maeda (f)
  - Super G winners: (Czech Republic) Martin Barták (m) / (Japan) Chisaki Maeda (f)
  - Super Combined winners: (Austria) Hannes Angerer (m) / (Austria) Lara Teynor (f)

=== 2023–24 FIS Grass Skiing World Cup ===
- June 23–25, 2023: WC #1 in (Czech Republic) Orlické Záhoří
  - Giant Slalom winners: (Italy) Daniele Buio (m) / (Czech Republic) Šárka Abrahamová (f)
  - Super G winners: (Switzerland) Mirko Hüppi (m) / (Czech Republic) Lenka Knorová (f)
- July 1–2, 2023: WC #2 in (Czech Republic) Předklášteří
  - Slalom #1 winners: (Czech Republic) Martin Barták (m) / (Czech Republic) Eliška Rejchrtová (f)
  - Slalom #2 winners: (Czech Republic) Jan Borak (m) / (Czech Republic) Eliška Rejchrtová (f)
- July 29–30, 2023: WC #3 in (Italy) Tambre - Belluno
  - Event was cancelled
- September 8–10, 2023: WC #4 in (Switzerland) Marbach
  - Slalom winners: (Switzerland) Mirko Hüppi (m) / (Italy) Margherita Mazzoncini (f)
  - Giant Slalom winners: (Switzerland) Mirko Hüppi (m) / (Italy) Margherita Mazzoncini (f)
  - Super G winners: (Switzerland) Mirko Hüppi (m) / (Czech Republic) Šárka Abrahamová (f)
- Overall Men's winner: (Czech Republic) Martin Barták
- Overall Women's winner: (Czech Republic) Eliška Rejchrtová

=== 2023–24 FIS Grass Skiing FIS Races & Junior Cups ===
- June 10 & 11, 2023: Event #1 in (Austria) Schwarzenbach
- June 16–18, 2023: Event #2 in (Sweden) Vrinnevibacken Norrköping
- July 21–23, 2023: Event #3 in (Slovakia) Jasenská Dolina
- August 18–20, 2023: Event #4 in (Italy) Tambre - Belluno
- September 15–17, 2023: Event #5 in (Germany) Neudorf

== Freeriding ==
=== 2024 Freeride World Tour ===
- January 27–28: 2024 Verbier Pro in (Switzerland) Verbier
  - Ski winners: (Germany) Max Hitzig (m) / (Poland) Zuzanna Witych (w)
  - Snowboard winners: (France) Victor de Le Rue (m) / (Spain) Núria Castán Barón (w)
- February 1–7: 2024 Ordino Arcalís Pro in (Andorra) Vallnord
  - Event cancelled
- February 14–20: 2024 Kicking Horse Golden BC Pro in (Canada) Kicking Horse Resort
  - Ski winners: (Germany) Max Hitzig (m) / (France) Astrid Cheylus (w)
  - Snowboard winners: (France) Victor de Le Rue (m) / (France) Anna Martinez (w)
- March 1–7: 2024 Georgia Pro in (Georgia (country)) Tetnuldi
  - Ski winners: (Canada) Marcus Goguen (m) / (Switzerland) Sybille Blanjean (w)
  - Snowboard winners: (France) Victor de Le Rue (m) / (Spain) Núria Castán Barón (w)
- March 12–18: 2024 Fieberbrunn Pro in (Austria) Fieberbrunn
  - Ski winners: (New Zealand) Ben Richards (m) / (France) Astrid Cheylus (w)
  - Snowboard winners: (France) Victor de Le Rue (m) / (Canada) Erin Sauvé (w)
- March 23–31: 2024 Yeti Xtreme Verbier in (Switzerland) Verbier
  - Ski winners: (Canada) Marcus Goguen (m) / (Norway) Hedvig Wessel (w)
  - Snowboard winners: (United States) Jonathan Penfield (m) / (Canada) Erin Sauvé (w)

== Freestyle skiing ==
=== World & Olympic Championships ===
- January 23–31: 2024 Winter Youth Olympics in (South Korea) Gangwon
  - Big Air winners: (Canada) Charlie Beatty (m) / (Italy) Flora Tabanelli (f)
  - Ski Cross winners: (Germany) Niklas Höller (m) / (Sweden) Uma Kruse Een (w)
  - Slopestyle winners: (United States) Henry Townshend (m) / (Italy) Flora Tabanelli (f)
  - Dual moguls winners: (South Korea) Lee Yoon-seung (m) / (United States) Elizabeth Lemley (w)
  - Mixed Team Dual moguls winner: United States
  - Mixed Team Ski Cross winner: Sweden
- March 25 – 30: 2024 FIS Freeski SS/BA Junior World Championships in (Italy) Livigno
- April 3 – 6: 2024 FIS Freestyle Junior Ski World Championships in (Italy) Chiesa in Valmalenco
- April 14 – 15: 2024 FIS Freestyle Junior Ski Cross World Championships in (Sweden) Idre Fjäll

=== 2023–24 FIS Freestyle Ski World Cup ===
- October 19 – 20, 2023: WC #1 in (Switzerland) Chur
  - Big Air winners: (Canada) Dylan Deschamps (m) / (Switzerland) Mathilde Gremaud (f)
- November 23 – 25, 2023: WC #2 in (Austria) Stubai
  - Big Air winners: (Canada) Evan McEachran (m) / (Switzerland) Mathilde Gremaud (f)
- November 30 – December 2, 2023: WC #3 in (China) Beijing
  - Big Air winners: (United States) Alexander Hall (m) / (Switzerland) Mathilde Gremaud (f)
- December 2 – 3, 2023: WC #4 in (Finland) Ruka
  - Moguls winners: (Japan) Ikuma Horishima (m) / (Australia) Jakara Anthony (f)
  - Aerials winners: (China) Qi Guangpu (m) / (Canada) Marion Thénault (f)
- December 5 – 9, 2023: WC #5 in (France) Val Thorens
  - Ski Cross #1 winners: (Austria) Tristan Takats (m) / (Sweden) Sandra Näslund (f)
  - Ski Cross #2 winners: (Canada) Jared Schmidt (m) / (Germany) Daniela Maier (f)
- December 7 – 9, 2023: WC #6 in (Sweden) Idre Fjäll
  - Moguls winners: (Canada) Mikaël Kingsbury (m) / (Australia) Jakara Anthony (f)
  - Dual Moguls winners: (Canada) Mikaël Kingsbury (m) / (United States) Jaelin Kauf (f)
- December 7 – 9, 2023: WC #7 in (China) Secret Garden
  - Halfpipe winners: (United States) Alex Ferreira (m) / (China) Eileen Gu (f)
- December 11 – 12, 2023: WC #8 in (Switzerland) Arosa
  - Ski Cross winners: (Canada) Jared Schmidt (m) / (Canada) Hannah Schmidt (f)
- December 13 – 16, 2023: WC #9 in (United States) Copper Mountain
  - Halfpipe winners: (United States) Alex Ferreira (m) / (China) Eileen Gu (f)
  - Big Air winners: (United States) Mac Forehand (m) / (France) Tess Ledeux (f)
- December 14 – 16, 2023: WC #10 in (France) Alpe d'Huez
  - Moguls winners: (Canada) Mikaël Kingsbury (m) / (Australia) Jakara Anthony (f)
  - Dual Moguls winners: (Sweden) Walter Wallberg (m) / (Australia) Jakara Anthony (f)
- December 16 – 17, 2023: WC #11 in (China) Changchun
  - Aerials winners: (Switzerland) Pirmin Werner (m) / (United States) Winter Vinecki (f)
  - Team Aerials winners: United States
- December 19 – 22, 2023: WC #12 in (Italy) Innichen
  - Ski Cross #1 winners: (Canada) Jared Schmidt (m) / (Sweden) Sandra Näslund (f)
  - Ski Cross #2 winners: (France) Terence Tchiknavorian (m) / (Switzerland) Sixtine Cousin (f)
- December 22 – 23, 2023: WC #13 in (Georgia (country)) Bakuriani
  - Moguls winners: (Japan) Ikuma Horishima (m) / (Australia) Jakara Anthony (f)
  - Dual Moguls winners: (Canada) Mikaël Kingsbury (m) / (Australia) Jakara Anthony (f)
- January 12 – 14: WC #14 in (France) Font Romeu
  - Event was cancelled.
- January 17 – 21: WC #15 in (Switzerland) Laax
  - Slopestyle winners: (Norway) Birk Ruud (m) / (Switzerland) Mathilde Gremaud (f)
- January 18 – 21: WC #16 in (Canada) Nakiska
  - Ski Cross #1 winners: (Canada) Reece Howden (m) / (Canada) Hannah Schmidt (f)
  - Ski Cross #2 winners: (Switzerland) Jonas Lenherr (m) / (Canada) Hannah Schmidt (f)
- January 19 – 20: WC #17 in (Canada) Val Saint-Côme
  - Moguls winners: (Sweden) Walter Wallberg (m) / (Australia) Jakara Anthony (f)
  - Dual Moguls winners: (Canada) Mikaël Kingsbury (m) / (Australia) Jakara Anthony (f)
- January 26 – 27: WC #18 in (United States) Waterville
  - Moguls winners: (Japan) Ikuma Horishima (m) / (Australia) Jakara Anthony (f)
  - Dual Moguls winners: (Canada) Mikaël Kingsbury (m) / (Australia) Jakara Anthony (f)
- January 27 – 28: WC #19 in (Switzerland) St. Moritz
  - Ski Cross winners: (Italy) Simone Deromedis (m) / (Canada) Marielle Thompson (f)
- January 31 – February 3: WC #20 in (Italy) Alleghe
  - Ski Cross #1 winners: (Sweden) Erik Mobärg (m) / (Canada) India Sherret (f)
  - Ski Cross #2 winners: (Canada) Reece Howden (m) / (Canada) Marielle Thompson (f)
- January 31 – February 4: WC #21 in (United States) Mammoth Mountain
  - Halfpipe winners: (United States) Alex Ferreira (m) / (Canada) Amy Fraser (f)
  - Slopestyle winners: (United States) Alexander Hall (m) / (Switzerland) Mathilde Gremaud (f)
- February 1 – 3: WC #22 in (United States) Deer Valley
  - Moguls winners: (Canada) Mikaël Kingsbury (m) / (United States) Olivia Giaccio (f)
  - Dual Moguls winners: (Japan) Ikuma Horishima (m) / (Australia) Jakara Anthony (f)
  - Aerials winners: (Canada) Alexandre Duchaine (m) / (United States) Winter Vinecki (f)
- February 8 – 11: WC #23 in (Georgia (country)) Bakuriani
  - Ski Cross #1 winners: (Sweden) David Mobärg (m) / (Canada) Marielle Thompson (f)
  - Ski Cross #2 winners: (Italy) Simone Deromedis (m) / (Canada) Marielle Thompson (f)
- February 10 – 11: WC #24 in (Canada) Lac-Beauport
  - Aerials #1 winners: (China) Qi Guangpu (m) / (United States) Karenna Elliott (f)
  - Aerials #2 winners: (China) Zhang Yifan (m) / (United States) Winter Vinecki (f)
- February 15 – 17: WC #25 in (Canada) Calgary
  - Halfpipe #1 winners: (United States) Alex Ferreira (m) / (China) Eileen Gu (f)
  - Halfpipe #2 winners: (United States) Alex Ferreira (m) / (China) Eileen Gu (f)
- February 22 – 25: WC #26 in (Austria) Reiteralm
  - Ski Cross #1 winners: (Sweden) Erik Mobärg (m)
  - Ski Cross #2 winners: (France) Youri Duplessis Kergomard (m) / (Canada) Brittany Phelan (f)
- February 29 – March 3: WC #27 in (Germany) Oberwiesenthal
  - Event was cancelled.
- March 8 – 10: WC #28 in (Kazakhstan) Almaty
  - Moguls winners: (Canada) Mikaël Kingsbury (m) / (Australia) Jakara Anthony (f)
  - Dual Moguls winners: (Canada) Mikaël Kingsbury (m) / (Australia) Jakara Anthony (f)
  - Aerials winners: (China) Qi Guangpu (m) / (Canada) Marion Thénault (f)
- March 13 – 16: WC #29 in (France) Tignes
  - Big Air winners: (United States) Alexander Hall (m) / (Switzerland) Mathilde Gremaud (f)
  - Slopestyle winners: (United States) Mac Forehand (m) / (France) Tess Ledeux (f)
- March 15 – 17: WC #30 in (Switzerland) Veysonnaz
  - Ski Cross winners: (Sweden) David Mobärg (m) / (Canada) Marielle Thompson (f)
- March 16: WC #31 in (Italy) Valmalenco
  - Dual Moguls winners: (Canada) Mikaël Kingsbury (m) / (Australia) Jakara Anthony (f)
- March 21 – 23: WC #32 in (Sweden) Idre Fjäll
  - Ski Cross #1 winners: (Sweden) David Mobärg (m) / (Canada) Brittany Phelan (f)
  - Ski Cross #2 winners: (Sweden) David Mobärg (m) / (Canada) Marielle Thompson (f)
- March 22 – 24: WC #33 in (Switzerland) Silvaplana
  - Slopestyle winners: (Switzerland) Andri Ragettli (m) / (France) Tess Ledeux (f)

=== 2023–24 FIS Freestyle skiing Continental Cup ===
==== 2023–24 FIS Freestyle skiing Grand Prix ====
- August 20, 2023: GP #1 in (Switzerland) Mettmenstetten
  - Aerials winners: (Switzerland) Noé Roth (m) / (Canada) Marion Thénault (f)
- August 26, 2023: GP #2 at the (United States) Utah Olympic Park
  - Aerials winners: (United States) Christopher Lillis (m) / (Canada) Marion Thénault (f)
- September 9, 2023: GP #3 in (Australia) Brisbane
  - Aerials winners: (Switzerland) Pirmin Werner (m) / (Australia) Airleigh Frigo (f)

==== 2023–24 FIS Freestyle skiing Asian Cup ====
- January 17–18: AC #1 in (China) Changchun
  - Men's Aerials winners: (China) Sun Jiaxu (#1) / (China) Jia Zongyang (#2)
  - Women's Aerials winners: (China) Xu Mengtao (2 times)
- February 2–3: AC #2 at the (Japan) Fukushima
  - Event cancelled
- February 7–8: AC #3 at the (Japan) Hakuba
  - Event cancelled
- February 17–18: AC #4 at the (Japan) Taira Ski Resort
  - Moguls winners: (Japan) Taketo Nishizawa (m) / (Japan) Haruka Nakao (f)
- March 1–2: AC #5 at the (Japan) Sapporo
  - Moguls winners: (Japan) Shima Kawaoka (m) / (Japan) Yuki Kajiwara (f)
- March 4–15: AC #6 at the (China) Tiger Ridge Mountain Park

==== 2023–24 FIS Freestyle skiing Australian and New Zealand Cup ====
- August 12 & 13, 2023: ANC #1 at (New Zealand) The Remarkables
  - Freeski Slopestyle winners: (Australia) Kai Martin (m) / (New Zealand) Madeleine Disbrowe (f)
- August 16 – 18, 2023: ANC #2 at the (Australia) Mount Hotham Alpine Resort
  - Men's Ski Cross winners: (Australia) Douglas Crawford (#1) / (Australia) Liam Michael (#2) / (Australia) Alfred Wenk (#3)
  - Women's Ski Cross winners: (Japan) Lin Nakanishi (#1st and #3rd) / (Australia) April Wynn (#2)
- August 29 & 30, 2023: ANC #3 at the (Australia) Perisher Ski Resort
  - Men's Moguls winners: (Australia) Cooper Woods-Topalovic (#1st) / (Australia) Jackson Harvey (#2nd)
  - Women's Moguls winners: (Australia) Jakara Anthony (2 times)
- September 2, 2023: ANC #4 at the (Australia) Mount Buller Alpine Resort
  - Event is cancelled.
- September 28 – October 1, 2023: ANC #5 at the (New Zealand) Cardrona
  - Freeski Big Air was cancelled.
  - Freeski Slopestyle winners: (New Zealand) Luca Harrington (m) / (New Zealand) Mischa Thomas (f)

==== 2023–24 FIS Freestyle skiing European Cup ====
- November 24 – 26, 2023: EC #1 at the (Austria) Pitztal
  - Ski cross events were cancelled
- December 8 – 9, 2023: EC #2 at the (Finland) Ruka
  - Men's Aerials winners: (Ukraine) Dmytro Kotovskyi (#1) / (Canada) Miha Fontaine (#2)
  - Women's Aerials winners: (United States) Winter Vinecki (#1) / (Kazakhstan) Zhanbota Aldabergenova (#2)
- December 15 – 16, 2023: EC #3 at the (Sweden) Idre Fjäll
  - Men's Ski cross winners: (Germany) Cornel Renn (#1) / (Australia) Douglas Crawford (#2)
  - Women's Ski cross winners: (Germany) Veronika Redder (#1) / (France) Mathilde Brodier (#2)
- January 7 – 8: EC #4 at the (France) Les Arcs
  - Big air winners: (Norway) William Bostadloekken (m) / (Switzerland) Anouk Andraska (f)
- January 12 – 13: EC #5 at the (Austria) Reiteralm
  - Men's Ski cross winners: (Germany) Ferdinand Dorsch (#1) / (Germany) Cornel Renn (#2)
  - Women's Ski cross winners: (France) Mylene Ballet Baz (2 times)
- January 16 – 19: EC #6 at the (France) Alpe d'Huez
  - Event cancelled
- January 18 – 19: EC #7 at the (Switzerland) Lenk
  - Event cancelled
- January 27 – 28: EC #8 at the (Switzerland) Leysin
  - Event cancelled
- February 3 – 4: EC #9 at the (Sweden) Duved
  - Moguls winners: (Sweden) Elis Moberg (m) / (Sweden) Nicolina Stenkula (f)
  - Dual Moguls winners: (Sweden) Karl Wärme (m) / (Sweden) Elis Lundholm (f)
- February 3 – 4: EC #10 at the (Germany) Grasgehren
  - Ski Cross winners: (Germany) Niklas Illig (m) / (Germany) Veronika Redder (w)
  - #2 Ski cross event was cancelled
- February 5 – 7: EC #11 at the (France) La Clusaz
  - Slopestyle winners: (Switzerland) Thierry Wili (m) / (Australia) Abi Harrigan (f)
  - Big air winners: (Switzerland) Nicola Bolinger (m) / (Switzerland) Michelle Rageth (f)
- February 8 – 9: EC #12 at the (France) Les Contamines
  - Men's Ski cross winners: (France) Alexis Jay (#1) / (Austria) Claudio Andreatta (#2)
  - Women's Ski cross winners: (Switzerland) Natalie Schaer (#1) / (Canada) Abby McEwen (#2)
- February 9 – 10: EC #13 at the (Poland) Kotelnica Bialczanska
  - Big air winners: (Finland) Joel Liimatainen (m) / (Ukraine) Mariia Aniichyn (f)
- February 10 – 11: EC #14 at the (Finland) Taivalkoski
  - Moguls winners: (Finland) Akseli Ahvenainen (m) / (Sweden) Nicolina Stenkula (f)
  - Dual Moguls winners: (Finland) Akseli Ahvenainen (m) / (France) Marie Duaux (f)
- February 15 – 16: EC #15 at the (Finland) Levi
  - Moguls #1 winners: (Sweden) Karl Wärme (m) / (France) Marie Duaux (f)
  - Moguls #2 winners: (Finland) Akseli Ahvenainen (m) / (France) Marie Duaux (f)
- February 15 – 16: EC #16 at the (Switzerland) Davos
  - Big Air winners: (Switzerland) Fadri Rhyner (m) / (Switzerland) Michelle Rageth (f)
- February 16 – 17: EC #17 at the (Italy) San Pellegrino
  - Men's Ski cross winners: (Germany) Cornel Renn (#1) / (Japan) Ryuto Kobayashi (#2)
  - Women's Ski cross winners: (Canada) Abby McEwen (#1) / (Austria) Tatjana Meklau (#2)
- February 22 – 23: EC #18 at the (Sweden) Stockholm
  - Dual Moguls #1 winners: (Finland) Akseli Ahvenainen (m) / (France) Marie Duaux (f)
  - Dual Moguls #2 winners: (Sweden) Filip Gravenfors (m) / (France) Marie Duaux (f)
- February 24 – 25: EC #19 at the (Italy) Prato Nevoso
  - Slopestyle winners: (Switzerland) Fadri Rhyner (m) / (France) Amelie Cancel (f)
- March 3 – 4: EC #20 at the (Switzerland) Airolo
  - Moguls winners: (Switzerland) Marco Tadé (m) / (France) Marie Duaux (f)
  - Dual Moguls winners: (Finland) Akseli Ahvenainen (m) / (Germany) Katharina Michl (f)
- March 4 – 7: EC #21 at the (France) Font Romeu
  - Slopestyle winners: (Switzerland) Adrien Vaudaux (m) / (France) Amelie Cancel (f)
  - Big Air winners: (France) Noah Viande (m) / (Switzerland) Anouk Andraska (f)
- March 7 – 8: EC #22 at the (Italy) San Pellegrino
  - Men's Ski cross winners: (France) Alexis Jay (#1) / (France) Romain Mari (#2)
  - Women's Ski cross winners: (Austria) Tatjana Meklau (2 times)
- March 9 – 10: EC #23 at the (France) Megève
  - Men's Moguls winners: (Finland) Akseli Ahvenainen (2 times)
  - Women's Moguls winners: (France) Perrine Laffont (#1) / (France) Marie Duaux (#2)
- March 9 – 14: EC #24 at the (Switzerland) Laax
- March 15 – 16: EC #25 at the (Switzerland) Airolo
- March 20 – 21: EC #26 at the (Austria) Reiteralm
- March 20 – 23: EC #27 at the (Austria) St. Anton
- March 21 – 22: EC #28 at the (Italy) Chiesa in Valmalenco
- April 8 – 14: EC #29 at the (Switzerland) Corvatsch

==== 2023–24 FIS Freestyle skiing Nor-Am Cup ====
- December 9 – 10, 2023: NAC #1 at the (Canada) Nakiska
  - Men's Ski cross winners: (United States) Jack Mitchell (#1) / (Canada) Nicholas Katrusiak (#2)
  - Women's Ski cross winners: (Canada) Emeline Bennett (#1) / (United States) Morgan Shute (#2)
- January 23 – 24: NAC #2 at the (United States) Copper Mountain
  - Halfpipe winners: (New Zealand) Ben Harrington (m) / (Germany) Sabrina Cakmakli (f)
  - Slopestyle winners: (United States) Walker Woodring (m) / (Canada) Skye Clarke (f)
- February 7 – 8: NAC #3 at the (United States) Deer Valley
  - Moguls winners: (Canada) Quinn Dawson (m) / (United States) Kasey Hogg (f)
  - Dual Moguls winners: (Canada) Cole Carey (m) / (United States) Kasey Hogg (f)
- February 9 – 11: NAC #4 at the (United States) Mammoth Mountain
  - Halfpipe winners: (United States) Cael McCarthy (m) / (United States) Kathryn Gray (f)
  - Slopestyle winners: (Canada) Jeremy Gagne (m) / (United States) Kathryn Gray (f)
- February 17 – 18: NAC #5 at the (Canada) Apex Mountain Resort
  - Moguls winners: (Canada) Charles Beaulieu (m) / (United States) Kasey Hogg (f)
  - Dual Moguls winners: (Canada) Samuel Goodison (m) / (United States) Kylie Kariotis (f)
- February 21 – 23: NAC #6 at the (United States) Gore Mountain
  - Men's Ski cross winners: (Canada) Nicholas Katrusiak (2 times)
  - Women's Ski cross winners: (United States) Morgan Shute (#1) / (Canada) Emeline Bennett (#2)
- February 22 – 23: NAC #7 at the (Canada) Lac-Beauport
  - Aerials #1 winners: (Canada) Émile Nadeau (m) / (Germany) Emma Weiss (f)
  - Aerials #2 winners: (Switzerland) Noé Roth (m) / (Germany) Emma Weiss (f)
- February 23 – 25: NAC #8 at the (Canada) Winsport Calgary
  - Halfpipe #1 winners: (United States) Nick Geiser (m) / (Canada) Emma Morozumi (f)
  - Halfpipe #2 winners: (Canada) Ethan Fernandes (m) / (United States) Kathryn Gray (f)
- February 24 – 25: NAC #9 at the (Canada) Val Saint-Côme
  - Moguls winners: (United States) Charlie Mickel (m) / (Canada) Jessica Linton (f)
  - Dual Moguls winners: (United States) Charlie Mickel (m) / (United States) Kasey Hogg (f)
- February 27 – March 1: NAC #10 at the (United States) Sunday River Resort
  - Ski cross winners: (Canada) Nicholas Katrusiak (m) / (United States) Morgan Shute (f)
  - 2nd Ski cross events were cancelled
- March 1 – 2: NAC #11 at the (United States) Stratton Mountain Resort
  - Moguls winners: (United States) Charlie Mickel (m) / (United States) Kasey Hogg (f)
  - Dual Moguls winners: (United States) Asher Michel (m) / (Canada) Ashley Koehler (f)
- March 1 – 2: NAC #12 at the (United States) Lake Placid
  - Aerials #1 winners: (Canada) Alexandre Duchaine (m) / (Canada) Marion Thenault (f)
  - Aerials #2 winners: (Canada) Émile Nadeau (m) / (United States) Megan Smallhouse (f)
- March 7 – 8: NAC #13 at the (Canada) Horseshoe Resort
  - Event was cancelled
- March 16 – 19: NAC #14 at the (United States) Steamboat Ski Resort
- March 19 – 20: NAC #15 at the (United States) Aspen/Snowmass
- March 30 – 31: NAC #16 at the (Canada) Stoneham-et-Tewkesbury
- April 4 – 7: NAC #17 at the (Canada) Nakiska

==== 2023–24 FIS Freestyle Skiing South American Cup ====
- August 4 – 6, 2023: SAC #1 in (Argentina) Cerro Catedral
  - Men's Slopestyle: (United States) Sean Jensen (2 times)
  - Women's Slopestyle winners: (Argentina) Josefina Magni (#1) / (Chile) Dominique Ohaco (#2)
  - Big Air winners: (Argentina) Cristóbal Colombo (m) / (Chile) Dominique Ohaco (f)
- August 13 – 15, 2023: SAC #2 at the (Chile) El Colorado
  - Men's Big Air winners: (Argentina) Nahuel Medrano (#1) / (Chile) Francisco Salas (#2)
  - Women's Big Air winner: (Chile) Dominique Ohaco (2 times)
- August 16 – 19, 2023: SAC #3 at the (Chile) Valle Nevado
  - Men's Freeski Slopestyle winner: (Argentina) Nahuel Medrano (2 times)
  - Women's Freeski Slopestyle winners: (Chile) Dominique Ohaco (2 times)
- September 30 & October 1, 2023: SAC #4 at the (Chile) Corralco
  - Men's Ski Cross winners: (France) Nicolas Raffort (#1) / (France) Youri Duplessis Kergomard (#2)
  - Women's Ski Cross winners: (Canada) Marielle Thompson (2 times)

=== 2023–24 Freestyle Skiing FIS Events ===
- For Full 2023-24 Freestyle Skiing FIS Events Calendar here.

=== 2023–24 Freestyle Skiing Open Events ===
- For Full 2023-24 Freestyle Skiing Junior Open Calendar here.

=== 2023–24 Freestyle Skiing Junior Events ===
- For Full 2023-24 Freestyle Skiing Junior Events Calendar here.

=== 2023–24 Freestyle Skiing National Championships ===
- For Full 2023-24 Freestyle Skiing National Championships Calendar here.

=== 2023–24 Freestyle Skiing National Junior Championships ===
- For Full 2023-24 Freestyle Skiing National Junior Championships Calendar here.

=== 2023–24 Freestyle Skiing Children Events ===
- For Full 2023-24 Freestyle Skiing Children Events Calendar here.

== Nordic combined ==
=== World & Olympic Championships ===
- January 29–31: 2024 Winter Youth Olympics in (South Korea) Gangwon
- February 6 – 11: 2024 Nordic Junior World Ski Championships in (Slovenia) Planica

=== 2023–24 FIS Nordic Combined World Cup ===
- November 24–26, 2023: WC #1 in (Finland) Ruka (Men's only)
  - Winners: (Norway) Jens Lurås Oftebro (#1st) / (Norway) Jarl Magnus Riiber (#2nd) & (#3rd)
- December 1–3, 2023: WC #2 in (Norway) Lillehammer
  - Men's winners: (Norway) Jarl Magnus Riiber (2 times)
  - Women's winners: (Norway) Gyda Westvold Hansen (2 times)
- December 15 & 16, 2023: WC #3 in (Austria) Ramsau
  - Men's winners: (Austria) Johannes Lamparter (2 times)
  - Women's winners: (Norway) Gyda Westvold Hansen (#1st) / (Norway) Ida Marie Hagen (#2nd)
- January 13 & 14: WC #4 in (Germany) Oberstdorf
  - Men's winners: (Norway) Jarl Magnus Riiber (2 times)
  - Women's winners: (Norway) Mari Leinan Lund (#1st) / (Norway) Ida Marie Hagen (#2nd)
- January 27 & 28: WC #5 in (Germany) Schonach
  - Men's winners: (Norway) Jarl Magnus Riiber (2 times)
  - Women's winners: (Norway) Mari Leinan Lund (#1st) / (Norway) Ida Marie Hagen (#2nd)
- February 2–4: WC #6 in (Austria) Seefeld
  - Men's winners: (Norway) Jarl Magnus Riiber (3 times)
  - Women's winners: (Norway) Ida Marie Hagen (2 times)
- February 9–11: WC #7 in (Estonia) Otepää
  - Men's winners: (Norway) Jarl Magnus Riiber (3 times)
  - Women's winners: (Norway) Gyda Westvold Hansen (#1st) / (Norway) Ida Marie Hagen (#2nd) & (#3rd)
- March 2 & 3: WC #8 in (Finland) Lahti
  - Men's winner: (Austria) Johannes Lamparter
  - Team sprint winners: Norway
- March 7–10: WC #9 in (Norway) Oslo
  - Men's winners: (Norway) Jarl Magnus Riiber (2 times)
  - Women's winner: (Norway) Ida Marie Hagen
- March 17: WC #10 in Trondheim
  - Men's winner: (Austria) Johannes Lamparter
  - Women's winner: (Norway) Ida Marie Hagen
  - Team winner: Norway

=== 2023–24 FIS Nordic combined Continental Cup ===
- December 8 & 9, 2023: CC #1 in (Norway) Lillehammer
  - Men's winners: (Germany) Jakob Lange (#1st) / (Norway) Aleksander Skoglund (#2nd)
  - Women's winners: (Finland) Minja Korhonen (2 times)
- December 16 & 17, 2023: CC #2 in (Finland) Ruka (Men's only)
  - Winners: (Austria) Mario Seidl (2 times)
- January 12–14: CC #3 in (Norway) Trondheim (Men's only)
  - Winners: (Norway) Marius Solvik (#1st) / (Germany) Simon Mach (#2nd) / (Norway) Aleksander Skoglund (#3rd)
- January 19–21: CC #4 in (Germany) Klingenthal
  - Men's winners: (Germany) Fabian Rießle (#1st) & (#2nd) / (Finland) Wille Karhumaa (#3rd)
  - Women's winners: (Poland) Joanna Kil (#1st) / (Germany) Jenny Nowak (#2nd) / (Germany) Sophia Maurus (#3rd)
- February 16–18: CC #5 in (Austria) Eisenerz
  - Men's winners: (Austria) Mario Seidl (2 times)
  - Women's winners: (Austria) Claudia Purker (#1st) / (Austria) Lisa Hirner (#2nd)
  - Team sprint winners: Germany
- February 24 & 25: CC #6 in (Germany) Oberwiesenthal
  - Event cancelled
- March 1–3: CC #7 in (Germany) Klingenthal
  - Event cancelled
- March 8–10: CC #8 in (Finland) Lahti (Men's only)
  - Winners: (Germany) Jakob Lange (2 times)
  - Team sprint winners: Germany

=== 2023–24 FIS Nordic combined Grand Prix ===
- August 19 & 20, 2023: GP #1 in (Germany) Oberwiesenthal
  - Winners: (Germany) Julian Schmid (m) / (Norway) Gyda Westvold Hansen (f)
- August 29 & 30, 2023: GP #2 in (Germany) Oberstdorf
  - Winners: (Germany) Julian Schmid (m) / (Norway) Gyda Westvold Hansen (f)
- September 1–3, 2023: GP #3 in (Austria) Villach
  - Men's winners: (Germany) Johannes Rydzek (#1st) / (Finland) Ilkka Herola (#2nd)
  - Women's winners: (Norway) Ida Marie Hagen (#1st) / (Slovenia) Ema Volavšek (#2nd)

=== 2023–24 FIS Nordic combined Alpen Cup ===
- August 19 & 20, 2023: OPA #1 in (Germany) Bischofsgrün(Women's only)
  - Winners: (Italy) Greta Pinzani (#1st) / (Germany) Ronja Loh (#2nd)
- September 9 & 10, 2023: OPA #2 in (Czech Republic) Liberec (Men's only)
  - Winners: (Germany) Richard Stenzel (#1st) / (Czech Republic) Jiří Konvalinka (#2nd)
- September 16 & 17, 2023: OPA #3 in (Austria) Tschagguns
  - Men's winner: (Czech Republic) Jiří Konvalinka (2 times)
  - Women's winner: (Slovenia) Teja Pavec (2 times)
- October 14 & 15, 2023: OPA #4 in (Switzerland) Gibswil
  - Winners: (Slovenia) Timon Brglez (m) / (Slovenia) Maša Likozar Brankovič (f)
  - Team winners: Austria (m) / Germany (f)
- December 16 & 17, 2023: OPA #5 in (Austria) Seefeld
  - Men's winners: (Czech Republic) Jiří Konvalinka (2 times)
  - Women's winners: (Austria) Katharina Gruber (#1st) / (Slovenia) Teja Pavec (#2nd)
- January 26–28: OPA #6 in (Poland) Szczyrk
  - Event cancelled
- February 17 & 18: OPA #7 in (Czech Republic) Harrachov
  - Men's winner: (Czech Republic) Jiří Konvalinka (2 times)
  - Women's winner: (Slovenia) Teja Pavec (2 times)
- February 24 & 25: OPA #8 in (Slovenia) Planica
  - Event cancelled
- February 24 & 25: OPA #8 in (Germany) Schonach
  - Event cancelled
- February 24 & 25: OPA #8 in (Austria) Seefeld
  - Event cancelled
- March 9 & 10: OPA #9 in (Germany) Oberhof
  - Men's winners: (Italy) Manuel Senoner (#1st) / (Germany) Felix Brieden (#2nd)
  - Women's winners: (Germany) Anne Häckel (2 times)

=== 2023–24 Nordic combined FIS Events ===
- For Full 2023-24 Nordic combined FIS Events Calendar here.

=== 2023–24 Nordic combined Youth Cup Events ===
- For Full 2023-24 Nordic combined Youth Cup Calendar here.

== Roller skiing ==
=== World Championships ===
- August 10–13, 2023: 2023 FIS Roller Skiing World Championships in (Italy) Lazzate
  - Event was cancelled
- August 18–20, 2023: 2023 FIS Roller Skiing Junior World Championships in (Latvia) Madona
  - 10 km/7.5 km C winners: (Sweden) Anton Grahn (m) / (Estonia) Gerda Kivil (w)
  - Sprint F winners: (Sweden) Anton Grahn (m) / (Latvia) Linda Kaparkalēja (w)
  - 20 km/15 km Mass Start F winners: (Sweden) Anton Grahn (m) / (Sweden) Nora Wallenius (w)

=== 2023–24 FIS Roller Skiing World Cup ===
- July 13–16, 2023: WC #1 in (Kazakhstan) Shchuchinsk
  - 1.4 km Sprint F winners: (Italy) Emanuele Becchis (m) / (Sweden) Linn Sömskar (w)
  - Sprint F winners: (Italy) Emanuele Becchis (m) / (Norway) Julie Henriette Arnesen (w)
  - 10 km F winners: (Italy) Tommaso Dellagiacoma (m) / (Sweden) Linn Sömskar (w)
  - 20 km Mass Start C winners: (Italy) Matteo Tanel (m) / (Sweden) Linn Sömskar (w)
- August 18–20: WC #2 in (Latvia) Madona
  - 15 km/10 km C winners: (Italy) Matteo Tanel (m) / (Sweden) Linn Sömskar (w)
  - Sprint F winners: (Italy) Emanuele Becchis (m) / (Norway) Julie Henriette Arnesen (w)
  - 20 km/15 km Mass Start F winners: (Norway) Kasper Herland (m) / (Sweden) Linn Sömskar (w)
- September 8–10: WC #3 in (Italy) Ziano di Fiemme
  - 15 km/10 km Mass Start F winners: (Latvia) Raimo Vīgants (m) / (Sweden) Linn Sömskar (w)
  - Sprint F winners: (Italy) Emanuele Becchis (m) / (Sweden) Linn Sömskar (w)
  - 15 km/13 km Mass Start C winners: (Kazakhstan) Vladislav Kovalyov (m) / (Italy) Maria Gismondi (w)
- Overall Men's winner: (Italy) Tommaso Dellagiacoma
- Overall Women's winner: (Sweden) Linn Sömskar

=== 2023–24 FIS Roller Skiing Junior World Cup ===
- July 13–16, 2023: WC #1 in (Kazakhstan) Shchuchinsk
  - 1.4 km Sprint F winners: (Kazakhstan) Sultan Bazarbekov (m) / (Italy) Anna Maria Ghiddi (w)
  - Sprint F winners: (Kazakhstan) Dastan Kalibekov (m) / (Italy) Anna Maria Ghiddi (w)
  - 10 km F winners: (Kazakhstan) Sultan Bazarbekov (m) / (Italy) Anna Maria Ghiddi (w)
  - 20 km/16 km Mass Start C winners: (Kazakhstan) Dastan Kalibekov (m) / (Italy) Anna Maria Ghiddi (w)
- August 18–20: WC #2 in (Latvia) Madona
  - 10 km/7.5 km C winners: (Sweden) Anton Grahn (m) / (Estonia) Gerda Kivil (w)
  - Sprint F winners: (Sweden) Anton Grahn (m) / (Latvia) Linda Kaparkalēja (w)
  - 20 km/15 km Mass Start F winners: (Sweden) Anton Grahn (m) / (Sweden) Nora Wallenius (w)
- September 8–10: WC #3 in (Italy) Ziano di Fiemme
  - 10 km Mass Start F winners: (Italy) Aksel Artusi (m) / (Italy) Maria Gismondi (w)
  - Sprint F winners: (Sweden) Jonatan Lindberg (m) / (Latvia) Linda Kaparkalēja (w)
  - 13 km Mass Start C winners: (Italy) Gabriele Rigaudo (m) / (Sweden) Matilda Grahn (w)
- Overall Men's winner: (Kazakhstan) Sultan Bazarbekov
- Overall Women's winner: (Italy) Anna Maria Ghiddi

=== Other FIS Roller Skiing Competitions ===
- Calendar & Results here

=== Roller Skiing Junior Competitions ===
- Calendar & Results here

== Ski jumping ==
=== World & Olympic Championships ===
- January 20–21: 2024 Winter Youth Olympics in (South Korea) Gangwon
  - Individual normal hill winners: (Kazakhstan) Ilya Mizernykh (m) / (Slovenia) Taja Bodlaj (w)
  - Mixed team winner: Slovenia
- February 7 – 11: 2024 Nordic Junior World Ski Championships in Planica
  - Individual normal hill winners: (Austria) Stephan Embacher (m) / (Slovenia) Tina Erzar (w)
  - Team normal hill winners: Austria (m) / Slovenia (w)
  - Mixed team winner: Austria

=== 2023–24 FIS Ski Jumping Continental Cup ===
Summer

- September 9 & 10, 2023: COC #1 in (Norway) Oslo (Men's only)
  - Winner: (Norway) Robert Johansson (2 times)
- September 16 & 17, 2023: COC #2 in (Austria) Stams (Men's only)
  - Winners: (Austria) Marco Wörgötter (#1st) / (Austria) Clemens Leitner (#2nd)
- September 22–24, 2023: COC #3 in (Germany) Klingenthal (Men's only)
  - Winners: (Slovenia) Domen Prevc (#1st) / (Slovenia) Lovro Kos (#2nd)
- October 6 & 7, 2023: COC #4 in (Germany) Lake Placid (Men's only)
  - Winners: (Germany) Pius Paschke (#1st) / (Norway) Fredrik Villumstad (#2nd) / (Austria) Clemens Aigner (#3rd)
- Overall Winner: (Germany) Pius Paschke

Winter

- December 9 & 10, 2023: COC #1 in (Norway) Lillehammer (Men's only)
  - Winners: (Germany) Luca Roth (#1st) / (Austria) Clemens Aigner (#2nd)
- December 15 & 16, 2023: COC #2 in (Finland) Ruka (Men's only)
  - Winners: (Norway) Benjamin Østvold (#1st) / (Austria) Clemens Leitner (#2nd)
- December 27 & 28, 2023: COC #3 in (Switzerland) Engelberg (Men's only)
  - Winners: (Norway) Anders Håre (#1st) / (Austria) Stephan Embacher (#2nd)
- January 6 & 7: COC #4 in (Germany) Garmisch-Partenkirchen (Men's only)
  - Winners: (Germany) Constantin Schmid (#1st) / (Norway) Robin Pedersen (#2nd)
- January 13 & 14: COC #5 in (Austria) Innsbruck (Men's only)
  - Winners: (Norway) Robin Pedersen (2 times)
- January 20 & 21: COC #6 in (Japan) Sapporo (Men's only)
  - Winners: (Austria) Francisco Mörth (#1st) / (Norway) Robin Pedersen (#2nd) / (Germany) Felix Hoffmann (#3rd)
- January 27 & 28: COC #7 in (Germany) Willingen (Men's only)
  - Winners: (Austria) Daniel Huber (#1) / (Norway) Benjamin Østvold (#2)
- February 3 & 4: COC #8 in (Norway) Lillehammer (Men's only)
  - Winners: (Poland) Maciej Kot (#1) / (Austria) Maximilian Ortner (#2)
- February 17 & 18: COC #9 in (Germany) Brotterode (Men's only)
  - Winners: (Norway) Pål-Håkon Bjørtomt (#1st) / (Austria) Maximilian Ortner (#2nd)
- February 23 – 25: COC #10 in (United States) Iron Mountain (Men's only)
  - Winners: (Norway) Jonas Schuster (#1st) / (Germany) Markus Eisenbichler (#2nd)
- March 2 & 3: COC #11 in (Slovenia) Planica (Men's only)
  - Winners: (Norway) Clemens Aigner (#1st) / (Austria) Clemens Aigner (#2nd)
- March 9 & 10: COC #12 in (Finland) Lahti (Men's only)
  - Winners: (Slovenia) Žak Mogel (#1st) / (Germany) Markus Eisenbichler (#2nd)
- March 16 & 17: COC #13 in (Poland) Zakopane (Men's only)
  - Winners: (Austria) Clemens Aigner (#1st) / (Poland) Paweł Wąsek (#2nd)
- Overall Winner: (Austria) Maximilian Ortner

=== 2023 FIS Ski Jumping Grand Prix ===
- July 29 & 30, 2023: GP #1 in (France) Courchevel
  - Men's winners: (Switzerland) Gregor Deschwanden (#1st) / (Bulgaria) Vladimir Zografski (#2nd)
  - Women's winner: (Slovenia) Nika Križnar (2 times)
- August 4 – 6, 2023: GP #2 in (Poland) Szczyrk
  - Men's winners: (Bulgaria) Vladimir Zografski (#1st) / (Poland) Piotr Żyła (#2nd)
  - Women's winner: (Slovenia) Nika Križnar (2 times)
- September 23 & 24, 2023: GP #3 in (Romania) Râșnov
  - Men's winners: (Switzerland) Gregor Deschwanden (#1st) / (Bulgaria) Vladimir Zografski (#2nd)
  - Women's winner: (Slovenia) Nika Križnar (2 times)
- September 30 & October 1, 2023: GP #4 in (Austria) Hinzenbach (Men's only)
  - Winners: (Germany) Andreas Wellinger (#1st) / (Bulgaria) Vladimir Zografski (#2nd)
- October 7 & 8, 2023: GP #5 in Klingenthal
  - Men's winner: (Austria) Manuel Fettner
  - Women's winner: (Slovenia) Ema Klinec
  - Mixed team winners: Germany
- Overall Men's winner: (Bulgaria) Vladimir Zografski
- Overall Women's winner: (Slovenia) Nika Križnar

=== 2023–24 FIS Ski Jumping Inter-Continental Cup ===
Summer

- September 2 & 3, 2023: ICOC #1 in (Slovenia) Ljubno ob Savinji
  - Event is cancelled.
- September 9 & 10, 2023: ICOC #2 in (Norway) Oslo (Women's only)
  - Winners: (Norway) Ingvild Synnøve Midtskogen (#1st) / (Italy) Annika Sieff (#2nd)
- September 16 & 17, 2023: ICOC #3 in (Austria) Stams (Women's only)
  - Winners: (France) Joséphine Pagnier (#1st) / (Italy) Annika Sieff (#2nd)
- October 6 – 8, 2023: ICOC #4 in (United States) Lake Placid
  - Event is cancelled.
- Overall Winner: (Italy) Annika Sieff

Winter

- December 9 & 10, 2023: ICOC #1 in (Norway) Lillehammer (Women's only)
  - Winners: (Slovenia) Tina Erzar (#1st) / (Germany) Agnes Reisch (#2nd)
- December 15 & 16, 2023: ICOC #2 in (Norway) Notodden (Women's only)
  - Winners: (Norway) Ingvild Synnøve Midtskogen (2 times)
- January 6 & 7: ICOC #3 in (Sweden) Falun (Women's only)
  - Winners: (Austria) Hannah Wiegele (2 times)
- January 13 & 14: ICOC #4 in (Austria) Innsbruck (Women's only)
  - Winners: (Czech Republic) Anežka Indráčková (#1st) / (Austria) Hannah Wiegele (#2nd)
- February 3 & 4: ICOC #5 in (Poland) Szczyrk (Women's only)
  - Event is cancelled.
- February 17 & 18: ICOC #6 in (Germany) Brotterode (Women's only)
  - Winners: (Slovenia) Tina Erzar (2 times)
- February 23 & 24: ICOC #7 in (Austria) Villach (Women's only)
  - Event is cancelled.
- March 8 & 9: ICOC #8 in (Finland) Lahti (Women's only)
  - Winners: (Slovenia) Tina Erzar (2 times)
- Overall winner: (Slovenia) Tina Erzar

=== 2023–24 FIS Cup ===
- August 26 & 27, 2023: FC #1 in (Poland) Szczyrk (Men's only)
  - Winners: (Austria) Niklas Bachlinger (#1st) / (Poland) Klemens Murańka (#2nd)
- September 2 & 3, 2023: FC #2 in (Slovenia) Ljubno ob Savinji
  - Event was cancelled
- September 16 & 17, 2023: FC #3 in (Switzerland) Einsiedeln (Men's only)
  - Winners: (Austria) Francisco Mörth (#1st) / (Slovenia) Matija Vidic (#2nd)
- October 7 & 8, 2023: FC #4 in (Austria) Villach (Men's only)
  - Winners: (Austria) Stefan Rainer (2 times)
- October 14 & 15, 2023: FC #5 in (Romania) Râșnov (Men's only)
  - Winners: (Austria) Francisco Mörth (2 times)
- December 9 & 10, 2023: FC #6 in (Switzerland) Kandersteg (Men's only)
  - Winners: (Austria) Marco Wörgötter (#1st) / (Austria) Stephan Embacher (#2nd)
- December 15 & 16, 2023: FC #7 in (Norway) Notodden (Men's only)
  - Winners: (Austria) Francisco Mörth (#1st) / (Austria) Stefan Rainer (#2nd)
- January 6 & 7: FC #8 in (Sweden) Falun (Men's only)
  - Winners: (Austria) Ulrich Wohlgenannt (2 times)
- February 3 & 4: FC #9 in (Poland) Szczyrk (Men's only)
  - Winners: (Austria) Hannes Landerer (2 times)
- February 23 & 24: FC #10 in (Austria) Villach (Men's only)
  - Event was cancelled
- March 2 & 3: FC #11 in (Germany) Oberhof (Men's only)
  - Winners: (Austria) Timon-Pascal Kahofer (#1st) / (Austria) Ulrich Wohlgenannt (#2nd)
- March 14 & 15: FC #12 in (Poland) Zakopane (Men's only)
  - Winners: (Kazakhstan) Danil Vassilyev (#1st) / (Austria) Stefan Rainer (#2nd)
- Overall Winner: (Austria) Stefan Rainer

=== 2023–24 FIS Ski Jumping Alpen Cup ===
- August 11 & 12, 2023: OPA #1 in (Germany) Pöhla (Women's only)
  - Winner: (Italy) Noelia Vuerich (2 times)
- September 9 & 10, 2023: OPA #2 in (Czech Republic) Liberec
  - Men's winner: (Germany) Adrian Tittel (2 times)
  - Women's winners: (Slovenia) Tina Erzar (#1st) / (Czech Republic) Anežka Indráčková (#2nd)
- September 23 & 24, 2023: OPA #3 in (Switzerland) Kandersteg
  - Men's winners: (Austria) Simon Steinberger (#1st) / (Switzerland) Juri Kesseli (#2nd)
  - Women's winner: (Slovenia) Tina Erzar (2 times)
- December 15 & 16, 2023: OPA #4 in (Austria) Seefeld
  - Men's winner: (Austria) Simon Steinberger (2 times)
  - Women's winner: (Slovenia) Tina Erzar (2 times)
- January 27 & 28: OPA #5 in (Poland) Szczyrk
  - Event was cancelled
- February 17 & 18: OPA #6 in (Slovenia) Planica
  - Men's winner: (Germany) Jannik Faißt (2 times)
  - Women's winner: (France) Lilou Zepchi (2 times)
- March 9 & 10: OPA #7 in (Germany) Oberhof
  - Men's winners: (Austria) Johannes Pölz (#1st) / 2nd competition was cancelled
  - Women's winner: (Slovenia) Živa Andrić (#1st) / 2nd competition was cancelled
- Overall men's winner: (Germany) Jannik Faißt
- Overall women's winner: (Slovenia) Tina Erzar

== Ski mountaineering ==
- For Full 2023 / 2024 season results here.

=== ISMF Championships ===
- January 8–12: 2024 ISMF European Championships in (France) Chamonix
  - Individual Race winners: (Switzerland) Rémi Bonnet (m) / (Sweden) Tove Alexandersson (f)
  - Sprint winners: (Spain) Oriol Cardona Coll (m) / (Switzerland) Marianne Fatton (f)
  - Vertical Race winners: (Switzerland) Rémi Bonnet (m) / (Austria) Sarah Dreier (f)
  - Mixed Relay winners: (Spain) Ana Alonso Rodriguez & Oriol Cardona Coll
- March 1–3: Wasatch Powderkeg in (United States) Solitude Mountain Resort
  - Individual Race winners: (United States) John Gaston (m) / (United States) Maria Lamb (f)
  - Sprint winners: (United States) Jules Goguely (m) / (United States) Hali Hafeman (f)
  - Vertical Race winners: (United States) John Gaston (m) / (United States) Hali Hafeman (f)
- March 2–6: 2024 Asian Championships of Ski Mountaineering in (China) Songhua Lake Ski Resort
  - Individual Race winners: (China) Buluer (m) / (China) Cidan Yuzhen (f)
  - Sprint winners: (China) (m) / (China) Cidan Yuzhen (f)
  - Vertical Race winners: (China) Buluer (m) / (China) Cidan Yuzhen (f)
  - Mixed Relay winners: (China) Cidan Yuzhen & Buluer
- April 20: Patrouille des Glaciers in (Switzerland) Verbier
  - Men winners: (Germany) Young Guns ( (Germany) Finn Hösch, (Andorra) Oriol Olm Rouppert & (Norway) Erik Kårvatn)
  - Women winners: (Switzerland) SAC Swiss Team Women 2 ( (Switzerland) Caroline Ulrich, (Switzerland) Alessandra Schmid & (Switzerland) Thibe Deseyn)

=== 2023–24 ISMF World Cup ===
- November 25–26, 2023: ISMF World Cup #1 in (France) Val Thorens
  - Sprint winners: (Spain) Oriol Cardona Coll (m) / (Switzerland) Caroline Ulrich (f)
  - Mixed Relay winners: (France) Emily Harrop & Thibault Anselmet
- January 20–21: ISMF World Cup #2 in (Andorra) Arinsal
  - Individual Race winners: (Switzerland) Rémi Bonnet (m) / (France) Emily Harrop (f)
  - Vertical Race winners: (Switzerland) Rémi Bonnet (m) / (Italy) Alba de Silvestro (f)
- January 27–28: ISMF World Cup #3 in (Spain) La Vall de Boí
  - Sprint winners: (France) Thibault Anselmet (m) / (France) Emily Harrop (f)
  - Mixed Relay winners: (Italy) Michele Boscacci & Alba de Silvestro
- February 2–5: ISMF World Cup #4 in (Switzerland) Villars-sur-Ollon
  - Sprint winners: (Switzerland) Robin Bussard (m) / (France) Emily Harrop (f)
  - Individual Race winners: (Switzerland) Rémi Bonnet (m) / (France) Emily Harrop (f)
  - Mixed Relay winners: (Spain) Oriol Cardona Coll & Marta Garcia Farres
- February 22–25: ISMF World Cup #5 in (Italy) Val Martello
  - Sprint winners: (France) Robin Galindo (m) / (France) Emily Harrop (f)
  - Individual Race winners: (France) Xavier Gachet (m) / (France) Axelle Gachet Mollaret (f)
  - Mixed Relay winners: (Italy) Michele Boscacci & Alba de Silvestro
- March 1–2: ISMF World Cup #6 in (Austria) Schladming
  - Sprint winners: (Spain) Oriol Cardona Coll (m) / (Switzerland) Caroline Ulrich (f)
  - Vertical Race winners: (Switzerland) Rémi Bonnet (m) / (Austria) Sarah Dreier (f)
- April 6–10: ISMF World Cup #7 in (Italy) Cortina d'Ampezzo

== Snowboarding ==
=== World & Olympic Championships ===
- January 20 – February 1: 2024 Winter Youth Olympics in (South Korea) Gangwon
  - Big air winners: (Canada) Eli Bouchard (m) / (Japan) Yura Murase (f)
  - Snowboard cross winners: (France) Jonas Schollet (m) / (Switzerland) Noemie Widmer (f)
  - Slopestyle winners: (South Korea) Lee Chae-un (m) / (Austria) Hanna Karrer (f)
  - Snowboard cross team winner: France
- March 22–24: 2024 FIS Snowboard Junior Alpine World Championships in (Austria) Lachtal
  - Parallel slalom winners: (Bulgaria) Kristian Georgiev (m) / (Canada) Aurelie Moisan (f)
  - Parallel giant slalom winners: (Germany) Samuel Vojtasek (m) / (Canada) Aurelie Moisan (f)
  - Parallel slalom team winners: (Germany) Benedikt Riel & (Germany) Salome Jansing
- March 24–30: 2024 FIS Snowboard SS/BA Junior World Championships in (Italy) Livigno
- April 6 & 7: 2024 Snowboard Cross FIS Junior World Championships in (Georgia (country)) Gudauri

=== 2023–24 FIS Snowboard World Cup ===
- October 21, 2023: WC #1 in (Switzerland) Chur
  - Big Air winners: (Japan) Hiroto Ogiwara (m) / (Japan) Kokomo Murase (f)
- November 30 – December 2, 2023: WC #2 in (China) Beijing
  - Big Air winners: (China) Su Yiming (m) / (Austria) Anna Gasser (f)
- December 1 – 3, 2023: WC #3 in (France) Les Deux Alpes
  - Snowboard Cross winners: (Canada) Éliot Grondin (m) / (France) Chloé Trespeuch (f)
  - Snowboard Cross mixed team winners: United Kingdom
- December 6 – 8, 2023: WC #4 in (China) Secret Garden
  - Halfpipe winners: (Australia) Scotty James (m) / (China) Cai Xuetong (f)
- December 8 – 9, 2023: WC #5 in (Canada) Edmonton
  - Big Air winners: (Japan) Taiga Hasegawa (m) / (New Zealand) Zoi Sadowski-Synnott (f)
- December 13 – 16, 2023: WC #6 in (United States) Copper Mountain
  - Halfpipe winners: (Japan) Ayumu Hirano (m) / (South Korea) Gaon Choi (f)
  - Big Air winners: (Japan) Hiroaki Kunitake (m) / (Japan) Kokomo Murase (f)
- December 14, 2023: WC #7 in (Italy) Carezza
  - Parallel Giant Slalom winners: (Italy) Maurizio Bormolini (m) / (Germany) Ramona Theresia Hofmeister (f)
- December 15 – 17, 2023: WC #8 in Cervinia
  - Snowboard Cross winners: (Austria) Alessandro Hämmerle (m) / (Switzerland) Sina Siegenthaler (f)
  - Snowboard Cross mixed team winners: Italy
- December 16, 2023: WC #9 in (Italy) Cortina d'Ampezzo
  - Parallel Giant Slalom winners: (Austria) Benjamin Karl (m) / (Germany) Ramona Theresia Hofmeister (f)
- December 23, 2023: WC #10 in (Switzerland) Davos
  - Parallel Slalom winners: (Italy) Daniele Bagozza (m) / (Germany) Ramona Theresia Hofmeister (f)
- January 13: WC #11 in (Switzerland) Scuol
  - Parallel Giant Slalom winners: (Austria) Benjamin Karl (m) / (Italy) Lucia Dalmasso (f)
- January 16 – 17: WC #12 in (Austria) Bad Gastein
  - Parallel Slalom winners: (Italy) Maurizio Bormolini (m) / (Germany) Ramona Theresia Hofmeister (f)
- January 17 – 20: WC #13 in (Switzerland) Laax
  - Halfpipe winners: (Australia) Scotty James (m) / (Japan) Mitsuki Ono (f)
  - Slopestyle winners: (Canada) Liam Brearley (m) / (United States) Julia Marino (f)
- January 20 – 21: WC #14 in (Bulgaria) Pamporovo
  - Men's Parallel Slalom winners: (Italy) Daniele Bagozza (#1) / (South Korea) Lee Sang-ho (#2)
  - Women's Parallel Slalom winners: (Czech Republic) Ester Ledecká (2 times)
- January 25: WC #15 in (Slovenia) Rogla
  - Parallel Giant Slalom winners: (Austria) Benjamin Karl (m) / (Japan) Tsubaki Miki (f)
- January 25 – 26: WC #16 in (Switzerland) St. Moritz
  - Snowboard Cross winners: (Canada) Éliot Grondin (m) / (Czech Republic) Eva Adamczyková (f)
- January 27 – 28: WC #17 in Simonhöhe
  - Parallel Giant Slalom winners: (Italy) Daniele Bagozza (m) / (Austria) Sabine Schöffmann (f)
  - Parallel Mixed Giant Slalom winner: Austria
- January 31 – February 4: WC #18 in (United States) Mammoth Mountain
  - Halfpipe winners: (Japan) Yuto Totsuka (m) / (Japan) Mitsuki Ono (f)
  - Slopestyle was cancelled
- February 2 – 4: WC #19 in (Georgia (country)) Gudauri
  - Snowboard Cross #1 winners: (Canada) Éliot Grondin (m) / (France) Chloé Trespeuch (f)
  - Snowboard Cross #2 winners: (Canada) Éliot Grondin (m) / (United Kingdom) Charlotte Bankes (f)
- February 8 – 11: WC #20 in (Canada) Calgary
  - Halfpipe winners: (Australia) Valentino Guseli (m) / (Japan) Mitsuki Ono (f)
  - Slopestyle was cancelled
- February 15 – 16: WC #21 in (Canada) Craigleith
  - Event was cancelled
- February 24 – 25: WC #22 in (Poland) Krynica
  - Men's Parallel Giant Slalom winners: (Austria) Andreas Prommegger (#1) / (Austria) Arvid Auner (#2)
  - Women's Parallel Giant Slalom winners: (Germany) Ramona Theresia Hofmeister (#1) / (Japan) Tsubaki Miki (#2)
- March 1 – 3: WC #23 in (Spain) Sierra Nevada
  - Snowboard Cross #1 winners: (Germany) Leon Ulbricht (m) / (United Kingdom) Charlotte Bankes (f)
  - Snowboard Cross #2 winners: (France) Merlin Surget (m) / (Italy) Michela Moioli (f)
- March 8 – 9: WC #24 in (Italy) Cortina d'Ampezzo
  - Snowboard Cross winners: (Canada) Éliot Grondin (m) / (United Kingdom) Charlotte Bankes (f)
- March 9 – 10: WC #25 in (Germany) Winterberg
  - Parallel Slalom winners: (South Korea) Lee Sang-ho (m) / (Czech Republic) Ester Ledecká (f)
  - Parallel Mixed Giant Slalom winner: Italy
- March 15 – 16: WC #26 in (Czech Republic) Špindlerův Mlýn
  - Parallel Slalom winners: (Poland) Anatol Kulpinski (m) / (Czech Republic) Zuzana Maděrová (f)
- March 15 – 17: WC #27 in (Austria) Montafon
  - Snowboard Cross #1 winners: (Austria) Alessandro Hämmerle (m) / (Italy) Michela Moioli (f)
  - Snowboard Cross #2 winners: (Austria) Alessandro Hämmerle (m) / (France) Chloé Trespeuch (f)
- March 16 – 17: WC #28 in (Germany) Berchtesgaden
  - Event was cancelled
- March 21 – 23: WC #29 in (Switzerland) Silvaplana
  - Slopestyle winners: (Canada) Liam Brearley (m) / (Japan) Reira Iwabuchi (f)
- March 22 – 24: WC #30 in (Canada) Mont-Sainte-Anne
  - Snowboard Cross #1 winners: (Canada) Éliot Grondin (m) / (United Kingdom) Charlotte Bankes (f)
  - Snowboard Cross #2 winners: (Canada) Éliot Grondin (m) / (United Kingdom) Charlotte Bankes (f)

=== 2023–24 FIS Snowboarding Asian Cup ===
- February 15 – 17: AC #1 in (Japan) Fukushima
  - Big Air winners: (Japan) Ryoma Kimata (m) / (Japan) Chihiro Edamatsu (f)
- February 26 – 28: AC #2 in (Japan) Hakuba
  - Slopestyle winners: (Japan) Yuto Miyamura (m) / (Japan) Kokomo Murase (f)
- March 4 – 14: AC #3 in (China) Yanbian
  - Men's Slopestyle winners: (Japan) Kaito Hamada (1st) / (Japan) Ruki Tobita (2nd)
  - Women's Slopestyle winners: (China) Zhang Xiaonan (2 times)
  - Men's Halfpipe winners:
  - Women's Halfpipe winners:
- March 4 – 5: AC #4 in (South Korea) Seoul
  - Parallel Giant Slalom winners: (South Korea) Cho Wan-hee (m) / (China) Gong Naiying (f)
  - Giant Slalom winners: (China) Bi Ye (m) / (China) Gong Naiying (f)

=== 2023–24 FIS Snowboarding European Cup ===
- November 20 – 22, 2023: EC #1 in (Austria) Pitztal
  - Event was cancelled
- December 8 – 9, 2023: EC #2 in (Germany) Götschen
  - Men's Parallel Slalom winners: (Austria) Arvid Auner (#1) / (Canada) Arnaud Gaudet (#2)
  - Women's Parallel Slalom winners: (Germany) Ramona Theresia Hofmeister (2 times)
- December 19 – 20, 2023: EC #3 in (Czech Republic) Moninec
  - Men's Parallel Slalom winners: (Germany) Ole-Mikkel Prantl (2 times)
  - Women's Parallel Slalom winners: (Canada) Kaylie Buck (#1) / (Canada) Aurelie Moisan (#2)
- January 4 – 6: EC #4 in (France) Font Romeu
  - Big Air winners: (France) Romain Allemand (m) / (Czech Republic) Laura Záveská (f)
- January 11 – 12: EC #5 in (Italy) Folgaria
  - Men's Parallel Slalom winners: (Germany) Ole-Mikkel Prantl (#1) / (Czech Republic) Kryštof Minárik (#2)
  - Women's Parallel Slalom winners: (Austria) Jessica Pichelkastner (#1) / (Austria) Carmen Kainz (#2)
- January 23 – 24: EC #6 in (Bulgaria) Pamporovo
  - Men's Parallel Slalom winners: (Ukraine) Mykhailo Kharuk (#1) / (Bulgaria) Petar Gergyovski (#2)
  - Women's Parallel Slalom winners: (Italy) Elisa Fava (#1) / (Switzerland) Flurina Neva Baetschi (#2)
- January 27 – 28: EC #7 in (Switzerland) Leysin
  - Event cancelled
- January 27 – 28: EC #8 in (France) Puy-Saint-Vincent
  - Men's Snowboard Cross winners: (Australia) Angus Jones (#1) / (Italy) Filippo Ferrari (#2)
  - Women's Snowboard Cross winners: (France) Lea Casta (#1) / (France) Felicie Leicht (#2)
- January 31 – February 1: EC #9 in (Czech Republic) Dolní Morava
  - Men's Snowboard Cross winners: (Germany) Kurt Hoshino (#1) / (France) Achille Leleu (#2)
  - Women's Snowboard Cross winners: (Switzerland) Noemie Wiedmer (2 times)
- February 5 – 6: EC #10 in (Austria) Reiteralm
  - Men's Snowboard Cross winners: (Italy) Niccolò Colturi (2 times)
  - Women's Snowboard Cross winners: (Switzerland) Camille Poulat (2 times)
- February 9 – 10: EC #11 in (Poland) Kotelnica Bialczanska
  - Big Air winners: (Netherlands) Lucas Hendriks (m) / (Czech Republic) Laura Záveská (f)
- February 15 – 16: EC #12 in (Switzerland) Davos
  - Big Air winners: (New Zealand) Txema Mazet-Brown (m) / (Austria) Hanna Karrer (f)
- February 16 – 17: EC #13 in (Italy) Colere
  - Men's Snowboard Cross winners: (France) Guillaume Herpin (#1) / (Austria) Elias Leitner (#2)
  - Women's Snowboard Cross winners: (Australia) Belle Brockhoff (#1) / (Switzerland) Noemie Wiedmer (#2)
- February 21 – 22: EC #14 in (Italy) Prato Nevoso
  - Slopestyle winners: (France) Romain Allemand (m) / (Austria) Hanna Karrer (f)
- February 24 – 25: EC #15 in (Germany) Grasgehren
  - Men's Snowboard Cross winners: (Germany) Leon Ulbricht (#1) / (Germany) Umito Kirchwehm (#2)
  - Women's Snowboard Cross winners: (Switzerland) Noemie Wiedmer (2 times)
- March 9 – 10: EC #16 in (Switzerland) Lenzerheide
  - Men's Parallel Slalom winners: (Italy) Mike Santuari (#1) / (#2)
  - Women's Parallel Slalom winners: (Ukraine) Eleonora Pavliuk (#1) / (Italy) Fabiana Fachin (#2)
- March 9 – 13: EC #17 in (Switzerland) Laax
- March 12 – 13: EC #18 in (Switzerland) Davos
- March 13 – 14: EC #19 in (France) Isola
- March 16 – 17: EC #20 in (Switzerland) St. Moritz
- March 21 – 24: EC #21 in (Switzerland) Lenk
- April 8 – 14: EC #22 in (Switzerland) Corvatsch
- April 17 – 20: EC #23 in (Austria) Kitzsteinhorn

=== 2023–24 FIS Snowboarding Nor-Am Cup ===
- January 4 – 5: NAC #1 at the (United States) Afton Alps
  - Men's Parallel Slalom winners: (Canada) Jules Lefebvre (#1) / (United States) Dylan Udolf (#2)
  - Women's Parallel Slalom winners: (Canada) Aurelie Moisan (#1) / (Canada) Kaylie Buck (#2)
- January 10 – 12: NAC #2 at the (United States) Steamboat Ski Resort
  - Parallel Giant Slalom winners: (Canada) Justin Carpentier (m) / (Canada) Aurelie Moisan (f)
  - Parallel Slalom winners: (United States) Robert Burns (m) / (Canada) Aurelie Moisan (f)
- January 10 – 12: NAC #3 at the (Canada) Sunshine Village
  - Event was cancelled
- January 16 – 18: NAC #4 at the (Canada) Sun Peaks Resort
  - Slopestyle winners: (Canada) Tosh Krauskopf (m) / (United States) Rebecca Flynn (f)
  - Big Air winners: (China) Yang Wenlong (m) / (Italy) Alessia Vergani (f)
- January 25 – 26: NAC #5 at the (United States) Copper Mountain
  - Halfpipe winners: (United States) Levko Fedorowycz (m)/ (Japan) Tsuki Yamazaki (f)
  - Slopestyle winners: (United States) Fynn Bullock-Womble (m)/ (United States) Kaitlyn Adams (f)
- February 4 – 6: NAC #6 at the (Canada) Val Saint-Côme
  - Men's Parallel Giant Slalom winners: (Canada) Ben Heldman (#1) / (Japan) Masaki Shiba (#2)
  - Women's Parallel Giant Slalom winners: (Canada) Aurelie Moisan (#1) / (Canada) Kaylie Buck (#2)
- February 7 – 9: NAC #7 at the (United States) Mammoth Mountain
  - Slopestyle winners: (Italy) Ian Matteoli (m)/ (United States) Hailey Langland (f)
  - Halfpipe and Big Air events were cancelled
- February 9 – 10: NAC #8 at the (Canada) Alpine Ski Club Collingwood
  - Parallel Slalom winners: (Canada) Arnaud Gaudet (m) / (Canada) Aurelie Moisan (f)
  - Parallel Giant Slalom winners: (Canada) Arnaud Gaudet (m) / (Japan) Noa Kanazawa (f)
- February 12 – 21: NAC #9 at the (Canada) Winsport Calgary
  - Halfpipe winners: (United States) Alessandro Barbieri (m)/ (Canada) Brooke D'Hondt (f)
  - Slopestyle and Big Air events were cancelled
- February 14 – 16: NAC #10 at the (United States) Big White Ski Resort
  - Event was cancelled
- February 21 – 23: NAC #11 at the (United States) Gore Mountain
  - Men's Snowboard Cross winners: (United States) Nathan Pare (2 times)
  - Women's Snowboard Cross winners: (United States) Virginia Boyd (#1) / (Canada) Hannah Turkington (#2)
- February 26 – 27: NAC #12 at the (United States) Holiday Valley Resort
  - Men's Parallel Giant Slalom winners: (Canada) Jules Lefebvre (#1) / (United States) Robert Burns (#2)
  - Women's Parallel Giant Slalom winners: (Japan) Asa Toyoda (#1) / (United States) Kaiya Kizuka (#2)
- February 27 – March 1: NAC #13 at the (United States) Sunday River Resort
  - Men's Snowboard Cross winners: (United States) Theodore McLemore (#1) / (United States) Nathan Pare (#2)
  - Women's Snowboard Cross winners: (United States) Madeline Lochte Bono (2 times)
- March 8 – 11: NAC #14 at the (Canada) Horseshoe Resort
  - Event was cancelled
- March 10 – 11: NAC #15 at the (Canada) Ontario
  - Event was cancelled
- March 16 – 19: NAC #16 at the (United States) Steamboat Ski Resort
- March 17 – 18: NAC #17 at the (United States) Aspen/Snowmass
- March 27 – 29: NAC #18 at the (Canada) Mont-Sainte-Anne
- April 2 – 4: NAC #19 at the (Canada) Stoneham-et-Tewkesbury

=== 2023–24 FIS Snowboarding South American Cup ===
- August 4 – 6, 2023: SAC #1 in (Argentina) Cerro Catedral
  - Men's Slopestyle winners: (Chile) Pedro Pizarro Sallato (#1) / (Chile) Álvaro Yáñez (#2)
  - Women's Slopestyle winner: (Italy) Alessia Vergani (2 times)
  - Big Air winners: (Chile) Pedro Pizarro Sallato / Women's event is cancelled.
- August 13 – 15, 2023: SAC #2 at the (Chile) El Colorado
  - Men's Big Air winners: (Chile) Álvaro Yáñez (#1) / (Chile) Pedro Pizarro Sallato (#2)
  - Women's Big Air winners: (Chile) Amanda Cardone (2 times)
- August 16 – 19, 2023: SAC #3 at the (Chile) Valle Nevado
  - Men's Slopestyle winners: (Chile) Álvaro Yáñez (#1) / (Argentina) Valentín Moreno (#2)
  - Women's Slopestyle winner: (Chile) Amanda Cardone (2 times)
- September 3 & 4, 2023: SAC #4 at the (Brazil) Corralco (CHI)
  - Men's Snowboard Cross winners: (Canada) Kai Hooper (#1) / (Brazil) Noah Bethonico (#2)
  - Women's Snowboard Cross winners: (Canada) Kennedy Justinen (2 times)
- September 30 & October 1, 2023: SAC #5 at the (Chile) Corralco
  - Men's Snowboard Cross winners: (United States) Nathan Pare (#1) / (France) Aidan Chollet (#2)
  - Women's Snowboard Cross winners: (Japan) Runa Suzuki (#1) / (France) Lea Casta (#2)

=== 2023 FIS Snowboarding Australian and New Zealand Cup ===
- August 12 & 13, 2023: ANC #1 at (New Zealand) The Remarkables
  - Slopestyle winners: (South Korea) Lee Dong-heon (m) / (New Zealand) Cool Wakushima (f)
- August 17 – 20, 2023: ANC #2 at the (Australia) Mount Hotham Alpine Resort
  - Men's Snowboard Cross winners: (Czech Republic) Jan Kubičík (#1st) / (Australia) James Johnstone (#2nd) / (Czech Republic) Radek Houser (#3rd)
  - Women's Snowboard Cross winners: (Australia) Amber Essex (#1st) / (Australia) Josie Baff (#2nd & #3rd)
- September 28 – October 1, 2023: ANC #3 at the (New Zealand) Cardrona
  - Slopestyle winners: (Japan) Taiga Hasegawa (m) / (Japan) Mari Fukada (f)
  - Big Air events were cancelled

=== 2023–24 Snowboarding FIS Events ===
- For Full 2023-24 Snowboarding FIS Events Calendar here.

=== 2023–24 Snowboarding Junior Events ===
- For Full 2023-24 Snowboarding Junior Events Calendar here.

=== 2023–24 Snowboarding National Championships ===
- For Full 2023-24 Snowboarding National Championships Calendar here.

=== 2023–24 Snowboarding National Junior Championships ===
- For Full 2023-24 Snowboarding National Junior Championships Calendar here.

=== 2023–24 Snowboarding Children Events ===
- For Full 2023-24 Snowboarding Children Events Calendar here.

== Speed skiing ==
=== World Championships ===
- March 19–24: 2024 FIS Speed World Ski Championships in (France) Vars
  - Senior winners: (France) Simon Billy (m) / (Italy) Valentina Greggio (w)
  - Junior winners: (Sweden) Victor Persson (m) / (France) Mareva Cau-Lapique (w)

=== 2024 Speed Skiing World Cup ===
- January 28–29: WC #1 in (France) Vars
  - Men's winners: (Italy) Simone Origone (2 times)
  - Women's winners: (Italy) Valentina Greggio (2 times)
- February 29: WC #2 in (Spain) Formigal
  - Event cancelled
- March 13–14: WC #3 in (Andorra) Grau Roig
  - Event cancelled
- March 27–29: WC #4 in (France) Vars

== Telemark skiing ==
- Full 2023–24 FIS Telemark Skiing World Cup Calendar here.

=== 2023–24 FIS Telemark Skiing World Cup ===
- December 15–17, 2023: WC #1 in (Italy) Pinzolo
  - Men's Sprint winners: (Switzerland) Nicolas Michel (2 times)
  - Women's Sprint winners: (United Kingdom) Jasmin Taylor (2 times)
- January 9–11: WC #2 in (United Kingdom) Les Houches
  - Event was cancelled
- January 17–18: WC #3 in (Italy) Carezza
  - Men's Sprint winners: (France) Élie Nabot (2 times)
  - Women's Sprint winners: (United Kingdom) Jasmin Taylor (2 times)
- January 26–28: WC #4 in (Switzerland) Melchsee-Frutt
  - Men's Classic winner: (France) Noe Claye
  - Men's Parallel Sprint winners: (Switzerland) Alexi Mosset (#1st) / (France) Élie Nabot (#2nd)
  - Women's Classic winner: (Switzerland) Martina Wyss
  - Women's Parallel Sprint winner: (Switzerland) Martina Wyss (2 times)
- January 31 – February 2: WC #5 in (France) Saint-Gervais-les-Bains
  - Event was cancelled
- February 15–18: WC #6 in (Norway) Ål
  - Sprint winners: (France) Charly Petex (m) / (Norway) Gøril Strøm Eriksen (w)
  - Parallel Sprint winners: (France) Élie Nabot (m) / (Norway) Gøril Strøm Eriksen (w)
  - Men's Classic winners: (France) Noe Claye (#1st) / (France) Charly Petex (#2nd)
  - Women's Classic winner: (Norway) Kaja Bjørnstad Konow (2 times)
- March 6–10: WC #7 in (Slovenia) Stari Vrh
  - Event was cancelled
- March 14–15: WC #8 in (Italy) Livigno
  - Men's Sprint winners: (France) Élie Nabot (#1st) / (France) Noe Claye (#2nd)
  - Women's Sprint winners: (France) Argeline Tan-Bouquet (#1st) / (Norway) Kaja Bjørnstad Konow (#2nd)
  - Men's Classic winner: (Norway) Trym Nygaard Løken
  - Women's Classic winner: (France) Argeline Tan-Bouquet
- March 18–21: WC #9 in (Italy) Bardonecchia
  - Event was cancelled
- March 18–22: WC #10 in (France) Pra Loup
  - Classic winners: (Norway) Trym Nygaard Løken (m) / (France) Augustine Carliez (w)
  - Sprint winners: (Norway) Trym Nygaard Løken (m) / (Norway) Goril Strom Eriksen (w)
  - Parallel Sprint winners: (France) Noe Claye (m) / (United Kingdom) Jasmin Taylor (w)
- Overall World Cup winners: (France) Élie Nabot (m) / (United Kingdom) Jasmin Taylor (w)

=== Other events ===
- December 1 & 2, 2023: FIS Telemark Sprint During Freeheeler Opening Hintertux in (Austria) Innsbruck
  - Sprint winners: (France) Theo Sillon (m) / (France) Laly Chaucheprat (w)
- January 7: Thyon 4 Vallées in (Switzerland) Sion
  - Sprint winners: (Switzerland) Nicolas Michel (m) / (United Kingdom) Jasmin Taylor (w)
- January 13 & 14: Trofeo Colomion in (Italy) Bardonecchia
  - Event was cancelled
- February 10 & 11: Varingskollen FIS & NC in (Norway) Varingskollen
  - Sprint winners: (France) Élie Nabot (m) / (France) Augustine Carliez (w)
  - Parallel sprint winners: (France) Élie Nabot (m) / (Norway) Gøril Strøm Eriksen (w)
- March 3: Österreichische Meisterschaften 2.0 in (Austria) Fageralm
  - Event was cancelled
- March 18–22: FIS Telemark World Junior Championships in Pra Loup
  - Classic winners: (France) Alexis Pagé (m) / (France) Augustine Carliez (w)
  - Sprint winners: (France) Alexis Pagé (m) / (Switzerland) Lea Lathion (w)
  - Parallel Sprint winners: (France) Alexis Pagé (m) / (Switzerland) Lea Lathion (w)
  - Team Parallel Sprint winners: France
