= 2012 FIS Speed Ski World Cup =

Competitions
- Venues: 4
- Individual: 10

The 13th FIS Speed Ski World Cup season began on 26 February 2012, in Pas de la Casa-Grandvalira, Andorra, and was concluded on 18 April 2012, at Verbier, Switzerland.

== Calendar ==
=== Key ===
S1	Speed One

=== Men ===
Date	Venue	Event	Winner	Second	Third	Details
26 Feb 2012	(Andorra) Pas de la Casa-Grandvalira	S1	(Austria) Klaus Schrottshammer	(Switzerland) Philippe May	(France) Bastien Montes	
09 Mar 2012	(Canada) Sun Peaks, British Columbia	S1	cancelled			
10 Mar 2012	(Canada) Sun Peaks, British Columbia	S1	cancelled			
18 Mar 2012	(France) Vars	S1	(Austria) Klaus Schrottshammer	(Italy) Ivan Origone	(Poland) Jędrzej Dobrowolski	
22 Mar 2012	(Sweden) Hundfjallet	S1	cancelled: replaced at Idre Fjäll on Mar 24, 2012			
24 Mar 2012	(Sweden) Idre Fjäll	S1	(Austria) Klaus Schrottshammer	(Switzerland) Philippe May	(Italy) Ivan Origone	
25 Mar 2012	(Sweden) Idre Fjäll	S1				
18 Apr 2012	(Switzerland) Verbier	S1				
19 Apr 2012	(Switzerland) Verbier	S1	cancelled: rescheduled to Apr 18, 2012			

=== Ladies ===
Date	Venue	Event	Winner	Second	Third	Details
26 Feb 2012	(Andorra) Pas de la Casa-Grandvalira	S1	(Sweden) Sanna Tidstrand	(Sweden) Linda Baginski	(France) Karine Dubouchet Revol	
09 Mar 2012	(Canada) Sun Peaks, British Columbia	S1	cancelled			
10 Mar 2012	(Canada) Sun Peaks, British Columbia	S1	cancelled			
18 Mar 2012	(France) Vars	S1	(Sweden) Sanna Tidstrand	(France) Karine Dubouchet Revol		
22 Mar 2012	(Sweden) Hundfjallet	S1	cancelled: replaced at Idre Fjäll on Mar 24, 2012			
24 Mar 2012	(Sweden) Idre Fjäll	S1	(France) Jennifer Romano	(France) Karine Dubouchet Revol	(Sweden) Sanna Tidstrand	
25 Mar 2012	(Sweden) Idre Fjäll	S1				
18 Apr 2012	(Switzerland) Verbier	S1				
19 Apr 2012	(Switzerland) Verbier	S1	cancelled: rescheduled to Apr 18, 2012			
