= FIS World Championships =

FIS (International Ski Federation) World Championships may refer to:

- FIS Alpine World Ski Championships, biennial international alpine skiing competition
  - FIS Alpine Junior World Ski Championships
- FIS Freestyle World Ski Championships, biennial international freestyle skiing competition
  - FIS Freestyle Junior World Ski Championships
- FIS Nordic World Ski Championships, biennial international Nordic combined competition
  - FIS Nordic Junior World Ski Championships
- FIS Ski Flying World Championships, biennial international ski flying competition
- FIS Snowboard World Championships, biennial international snowboarding competition
- World Para Alpine Skiing Championships, biennial international paralympic alpine skiing competition
- FIS Speed World Ski Championships, biennial international speed skiing competition
- FIS Telemark World Championships, biennial international Telemark racing competition
- FIS Grass Ski World Championships, biennial international grass skiing competition
