= FIS Speed World Ski Championships =

International Speed skiing competitions

- Status: active
- Genre: sporting event
- Date: January-February
- Frequency: biennial (since 1995)
- Location: various
- Inaugurated: 1995
- Organiser: FIS

The FIS World Speed Skiing Championships are a biannual speed skiing competition organized by FIS. A demonstration sport on the occasion of the 1992 Olympic Games in Albertville, the World Championships are today the most prestigious event, followed by the World Cup. The first World Championships officially recognized by the FIS were held in 1995 though they have existed since 1985.

== Venues ==
| Year | Location |
|---|---|
| 1995 | (Finland) Kolari |
| 1996 | (France) Vars / Les Arcs |
| 1997 | (France) Vars |
| 1998 | (France) Vars |
| 1999 | (Sweden) Idre |
| 2001 | (Italy) Cervinia |
| 2003 | (Finland) Salla |
| 2005 | (Italy) Breuil / Cervinia |
| 2007 | (Switzerland) Verbier |
| 2009 | (France) Vars |
| 2011 | (Switzerland) Verbier |
| 2013 | (France) Vars |
| 2015 | (Andorra) Grandvalira |
| 2017 | (Sweden) Idre |
| 2019 | (France) Vars |
| 2022 | (France) Vars |
| 2024 | (France) Vars |
| 2025 | (France) Vars |
| 2026 | (France) Vars |

== Medallists ==
=== Men's championship ===
| Year | Gold | Silver | Bronze |
|---|---|---|---|
| 2026 | Simon Billy (FRA) | Simone Origone (ITA) | Jukka Viitasaari (FIN) |
| 2025 | Simon Billy (FRA) | Manuel Kramer (AUT) | Simone Origone (ITA) |
| 2024 | Simon Billy (FRA) | Radim Palan (CZE) | Manuel Kramer (AUT) |
| 2022 | Simon Billy (FRA) | Manuel Kramer (AUT) | Simone Origone (ITA) |
| 2019 | Simone Origone (ITA) | Simon Billy (FRA) | Klaus Schrottshammer (AUT) |
| 2017 | Bastien Montes (FRA) | Manuel Kramer (AUT) | Klaus Schrottshammer (AUT) |
| 2015 | Ivan Origone (ITA) | Simone Origone (ITA) | Klaus Schrottshammer (AUT) |
| 2013 | Simone Origone (ITA) | Bastien Montes (FRA) | Simon Billy (FRA) |
| 2011 | Simone Origone (ITA) | Ivan Origone (ITA) | Bastien Montes (FRA) |
| 2009 | Simone Origone (ITA) | Philippe May (SUI) | Jonathan Moret (SUI) |
| 2007 | Simone Origone (ITA) | Philippe May (SUI) | Bastien Montes (FRA) |
| 2005 | Simone Origone (ITA) | Philippe May (SUI) | Ross Anderson (USA) |
| 2003 | Jukka Viitasaari (FIN) | John Hembel (USA) | Marc Poncin (GBR) |
| 2001 | Jukka Viitasaari (FIN) | Philippe Goitschel (FRA) | Serge Perroud (FRA) |
| 1999 | Philippe Goitschel (FRA) | Kokipii Jyrki (FRA) | Johan Rousseau (FRA) |
| 1998 | Jeffrey Hamilton (USA) | Philippe Goitschel (FRA) | Harry Egger (AUT) |
| 1997 | Harry Egger (AUT) | Jeffrey Hamilton (USA) | Mark Rupprecht (USA) |
| 1996 | Philippe Billy (FRA); Markku Tammela (FIN) | - | Jeffrey Hamilton (USA) |
| 1995 | Philippe Goitschel (FRA) | Bengt Jonnson (SWE) | Esa Maata (FIN) |

=== Women's championship ===
| Year | Gold | Silver | Bronze |
|---|---|---|---|
| 2026 | Valentina Greggio (ITA) | Siri Kling-Andersson (SWE) | Ludivine Toche (FRA) |
| 2025 | Valentina Greggio (ITA) | Agnes Abrahamsson (SWE) | Cléa Martinez (FRA) |
| 2024 | Valentina Greggio (ITA) | Cléa Martinez (FRA) | Mathilda Persson (SWE) |
| 2022 | Valentina Greggio (ITA) | Cléa Martinez (FRA) | Britta Backlund (SWE) |
| 2019 | Britta Backlund (SWE) | Lisa Hovland-Udén (SWE) | Valentina Greggio (ITA) |
| 2017 | Valentina Greggio (ITA) | Karine Dubouchet (FRA) | Lisa Hovland-Udén (SWE) |
| 2015 | Valentina Greggio (ITA) | Linda Baginski (SWE) | Lisa Hovland-Udén (SWE) |
| 2013 | Liss-Anne Pettersen (NOR) | Sanna Tidstrand (SWE) | Karine Dubouchet (FRA) |
| 2011 | Karine Dubouchet (FRA) | Linda Baginski (SWE) | Sanna Tidstrand (SWE) |
| 2009 | Karine Dubouchet (FRA) | Elena Banfo (ITA); Sanna Tidstrand (SWE) | Not awarded |
| 2007 | Sanna Tidstrand (SWE) | Elena Banfo (ITA) | Emeli Wolff (SWE) |
| 2005 | Tracie Sachs (USA) | Kati Matsaepelto (FIN) | Elena Banfo (ITA) |
| 2003 | Jaana Viitasaari (FIN) | Tracie Sachs (USA) | Kati Matsaepelto (FIN) |
| 2001 | Karine Dubouchet (FRA) | Jaana Viitasaari (FIN) | Tracie Sachs (USA) |
| 1999 | Karine Dubouchet (FRA) | Carolyn Curl (USA) | Tracie Sachs (USA) |
| 1998 | Karine Dubouchet (FRA) | Carolyn Curl (USA) | Laurence Leuba (SUI) |
| 1997 | Carolyn Curl (USA) | Karine Dubouchet (FRA) | Régine Bianco (SUI) |
| 1996 | Karine Dubouchet (FRA) | Carolyn Curl (USA) | Ulla Riihimäki (FIN) |
| 1995 | Cheryl Sandercock (CAN) | Anna Morin (SWE) | Liss-Anne Pettersen (NOR) |
