= Valentina Greggio =

Italian speedskier

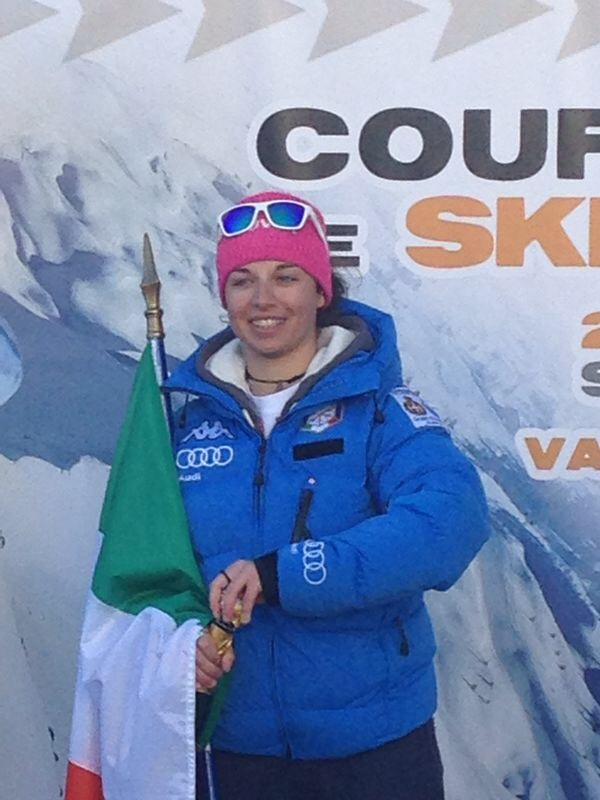
Valentina Greggio in Vars, Hautes-Alpes 2014.

Valentina Greggio (born 19 March 1991) is an Italian speed skier. She is the current women's world record holder with a speed of 248.270 kilometres per hour (154 mph).

== Career ==
Greggio first broke the world record in 2016 with 247.083 km/h. She held that record until she improved it on 3 April 2026 in Vars, France, achieving a speed of 248.270 km/h.

As of the end of the 2025/2026 season, Greggio had won 55 World Cup races and 6 World Championships titles.

Outside of speed skiing, she has worked as a teacher, ski instructor and athletic trainer.
