= Simon Billy =

French speedskier

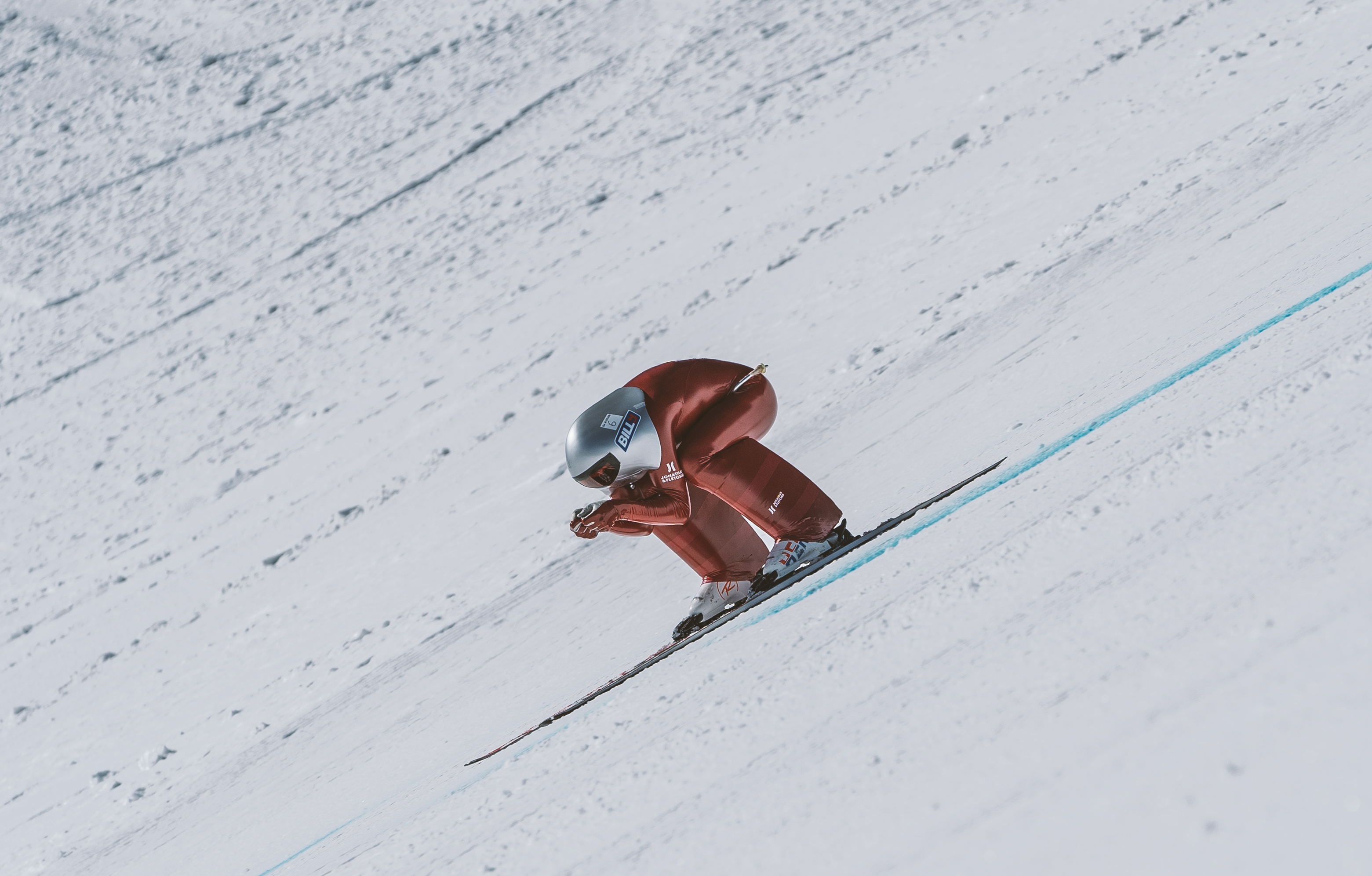
Simon Billy in Vars, Hautes-Alpes 2019.

Simon Billy (born 5 December 1991 in Montpellier) is a French speedskier. He is the son of speedskier Philippe Billy, former world record holder of 243.902 km/h.

Billy skied from an early age and was trained by his father, his younger brother Louis Billy is also a speedskier (241.125 km/h.)

Billy lives in Vars, Hautes-Alpes where the world's fastest speedski track is located.

On 22 March 2023, Billy set a new world record with 255.500 km/h.
