= Sanna Tidstrand =

Swedish freestyle skier

Sanna Tidstrand (born 1985) is a retired Swedish freestyle skier who specialized in ski cross.

She made her FIS Freestyle Ski World Cup debut in March 2003 in Les Contamines, being disqualified. She collected her first World Cup points with an 11th place in November 2003 in Saas-Fee, and toward the end of the 2003–04 World Cup circuit she managed three top-10 placements, the best being 6th in February 2004 in Naeba. The next season, in January–February 2005, she managed a 4th place in Pozza di Fassa and a 5th place in Naeba. She also finished 16th at the 2005 World Championships.

At the Winter X Games she finished 8th in 2003, won the bronze medal in 2004, the gold medal in 2005, finished 4th in 2006 and 17th in 2007. She also took up speed skiing, breaking the world speed ski record in April 2006.

She represented the sports club Sälens IF.
