= Vars, Hautes-Alpes =

Vars
- Commune
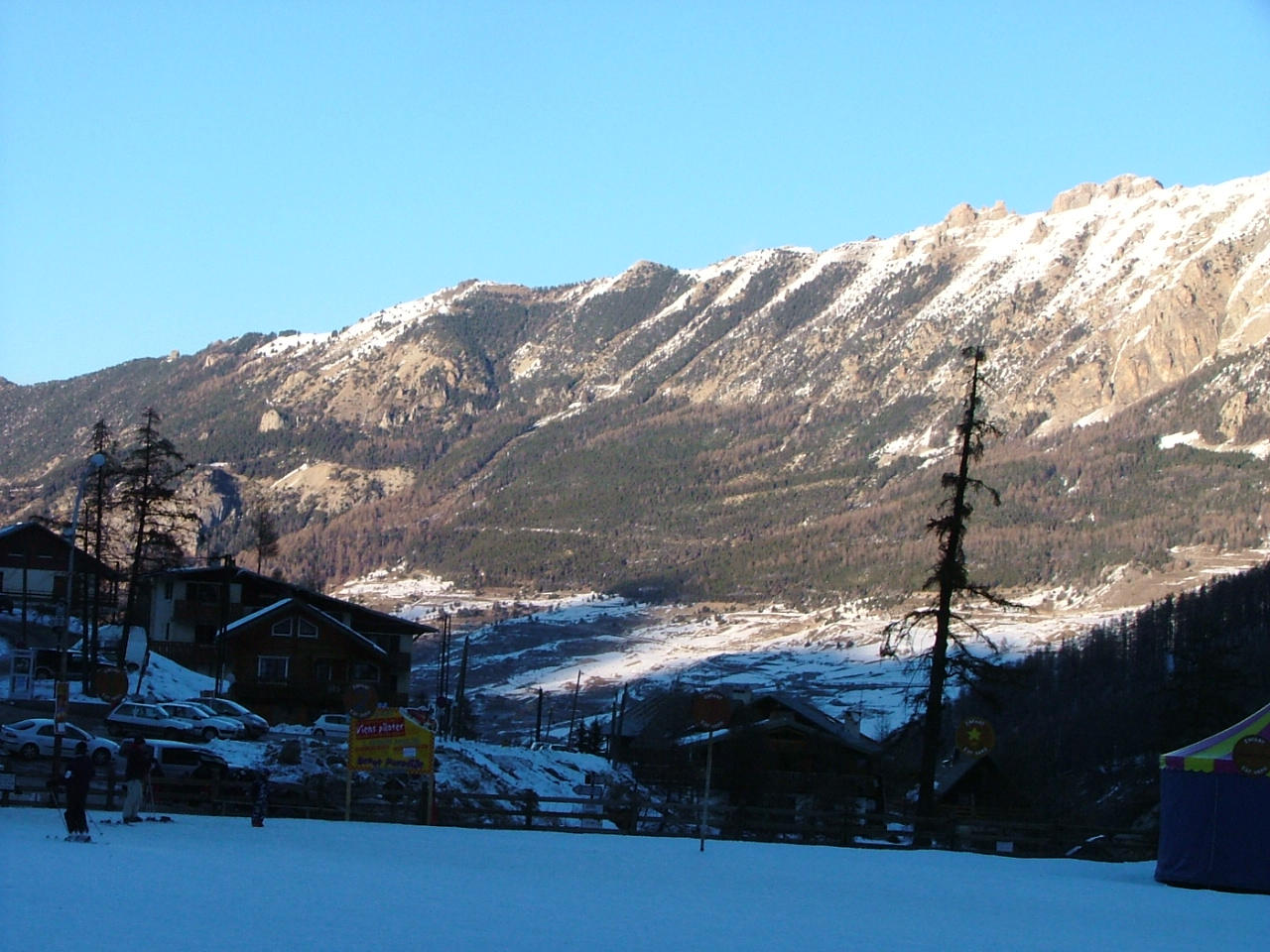
- The mountainous landscape around Vars

- Coat of arms
- Location of Vars
- Location within France Location within Provence-Alpes-Côte d'Azur
- Coordinates: 44°35′45″N 6°41′26″E
- Country: France
- Region: Provence-Alpes-Côte d'Azur
- Department: Hautes-Alpes
- Arrondissement: Briançon
- Canton: Guillestre

Government
  - Mayor (2026–32): Jérôme Hosszu
- Area^{1}: 92.2 km^{2} (35.6 sq mi)
- Elevation: 1,650 m (5,410 ft)
- Highest elevation: 3,381 m (11,093 ft)
- Lowest elevation: 1,320 m (4,330 ft)
- Population (2023): 588
  - Density: 6.38/km^{2} (16.5/sq mi)
- Time zone: UTC+01:00 (CET)
  - Summer (DST): UTC+02:00 (CEST)
- INSEE/Postal code: 05177 /05560
- ^{1} French Land Register data, which excludes lakes, ponds, glaciers > 1 km^{2} (0.386 sq mi or 247 acres) and river estuaries.

Vars (French pronunciation: [vaʁs]) is a commune in the Hautes-Alpes department, southeastern France.

It is famous for its ski resort, with seven snow parks and 185 kilometres (115 mi) of ski slopes.

== Population ==
Historical population
Year	Pop.	±% p.a.
1968	433	—
1975	779	+8.75%
1982	897	+2.04%
1990	941	+0.60%
1999	637	−4.24%
2007	599	−0.77%
2012	706	+3.34%
2017	525	−5.75%
2023	588	+1.91%
Source: INSEE

== See also ==
- Communes of the Hautes-Alpes department
