= Alpine skiing at the 2010 Winter Olympics – Women's slalom =

Women's slalom at the XXI Olympic Winter Games
- alpine skiing
- Venue: Whistler Creekside; Whistler, British Columbia; Canada
- Date: February 26, 2010
- Competitors: 87 from 47 nations
- Winning time: 1:42.89

Medalists
1st place, gold medalist(s)		Maria Riesch	Germany
2nd place, silver medalist(s)		Marlies Schild	Austria
3rd place, bronze medalist(s)		Šárka Záhrobská	Czech Republic

The women's slalom competition of the Vancouver 2010 Olympics was held at Whistler Creekside in Whistler, British Columbia on February 26, 2010.

The race was held in challenging weather conditions of fog, snow, and warm temperatures. Maria Riesch of Germany won her second gold medal of these Olympics.

== Results ==
Rank	Bib	Name	Country	Run 1	Rank	Run 2	Rank	Total	Difference
1st place, gold medalist(s)	5	Maria Riesch	Germany	50.75	1	52.14	3	1:42.89	+0.00
2nd place, silver medalist(s)	7	Marlies Schild	Austria	51.40	3	51.92	1	1:43.32	+0.43
3rd place, bronze medalist(s)	1	Šárka Záhrobská	Czech Republic	51.15	2	52.75	7	1:43.90	+1.01
4	9	Maria Pietilä Holmner	Sweden	51.64	5	52.58	6	1:44.22	+1.33
5	6	Sandrine Aubert	France	51.68	7	52.78	8	1:44.46	+1.57
6	3	Tanja Poutiainen	Finland	51.67	6	53.26	16	1:44.93	+2.04
7	31	Elisabeth Görgl	Austria	53.01	22	51.96	2	1:44.97	+2.08
8	18	Nicole Gius	Italy	51.71	8	53.30	17	1:45.01	+2.12
9	14	Tina Maze	Slovenia	52.28	14	52.81	9	1:45.09	+2.20
10	29	Veronika Zuzulová	Slovakia	52.11	11	53.03	11	1:45.14	+2.25
11	16	Manuela Mölgg	Italy	53.09	24	52.22	4	1:45.31	+2.42
12	8	Ana Jelušić	Croatia	52.37	16	53.06	14	1:45.43	+2.54
13	4	Kathrin Zettel	Austria	52.59	18	53.00	10	1:45.59	+2.70
14	11	Christina Geiger	Germany	52.10	10	53.52	19	1:45.62	+2.73
15	15	Frida Hansdotter	Sweden	52.50	17	53.17	15	1:45.67	+2.78
16	26	Sarah Schleper	United States	51.83	9	54.05	28	1:45.88	+2.99
17	25	Brigitte Acton	Canada	52.11	11	53.82	21	1:45.93	+3.04
18	30	Denise Karbon	Italy	53.44	27	52.50	5	1:45.94	+3.05
19	23	Anna Goodman	Canada	53.01	22	53.03	11	1:46.04	+3.15
20	37	Erin Mielzynski	Canada	52.60	19	53.49	18	1:46.09	+3.20
21	17	Therese Borssén	Sweden	52.97	21	53.74	20	1:46.71	+3.82
22	36	Marina Nigg	Liechtenstein	53.78	30	53.05	13	1:46.83	+3.94
23	24	Maruša Ferk	Slovenia	53.20	26	53.83	22	1:47.03	+4.14
24	43	Jana Gantnerová	Slovakia	53.54	28	53.92	26	1:47.46	+4.57
25	27	Nika Fleiss	Croatia	53.68	29	53.91	25	1:47.59	+4.70
26	38	Anne-Sophie Barthet	France	53.82	31	54.01	27	1:47.83	+4.94
27	39	Karen Persyn	Belgium	54.09	33	53.87	23	1:47.96	+5.07
28	49	Elena Prosteva	Russia	54.20	34	54.14	30	1:48.34	+5.45
29	21	Nastasia Noens	France	54.49	36	54.08	29	1:48.57	+5.68
30	32	Hailey Duke	United States	54.02	32	54.67	31	1:48.69	+5.80
31	33	Marie-Michèle Gagnon	Canada	55.64	42	53.87	23	1:49.51	+6.62
32	53	Nevena Ignjatović	Serbia	55.27	41	55.21	33	1:50.48	+7.59
33	52	Lyaysan Rayanova	Russia	55.13	40	55.69	35	1:50.82	+7.93
34	42	Matea Ferk	Croatia	54.95	39	55.98	36	1:50.93	+8.04
35	44	Agnieszka Gąsienica-Daniel	Poland	57.06	46	55.13	32	1:52.19	+9.30
36	50	Macarena Simari Birkner	Argentina	56.84	44	55.51	34	1:52.35	+9.46
37	51	Bogdana Matsotska	Ukraine	56.46	43	56.54	37	1:53.00	+10.11
38	64	Maria Shkanova	Belarus	56.92	45	57.58	39	1:54.50	+11.61
39	47	Sofija Novoselić	Croatia	58.17	48	56.74	38	1:54.91	+12.02
40	61	Žana Novaković	Bosnia and Herzegovina	58.19	49	57.76	40	1:55.95	+13.06
41	70	Noelle Barahona	Chile	58.74	50	59.08	41	1:57.82	+14.93
42	73	Tiiu Nurmberg	Estonia	58.91	52	59.08	41	1:57.99	+15.10
43	68	Chirine Njeim	Lebanon	58.97	53	59.23	43	1:58.20	+15.31
44	65	Zsófia Döme	Hungary	58.74	50	59.58	44	1:58.32	+15.43
45	72	Anna Berecz	Hungary	59.81	60	59.82	45	1:59.63	+16.74
46	58	Kim Sun-Joo	South Korea	59.70	58	1:00.33	46	2:00.03	+17.14
47	66	Sophia Ralli	Greece	59.32	55	1:01.09	48	2:00.41	+17.52
48	77	Maya Harrisson	Brazil	1:01.18	64	1:00.49	47	2:01.67	+18.78
49	76	Liene Fimbauere	Latvia	1:00.30	62	1:01.81	50	2:02.11	+19.22
50	79	Nino Tsiklauri	Georgia	59.77	59	1:02.55	52	2:02.32	+19.43
51	80	Cynthia Denzler	Colombia	1:01.14	63	1:01.25	49	2:02.39	+19.50
52	78	Yina Moe-Lange	Denmark	1:02.75	66	1:01.95	51	2:04.70	+21.81
53	86	Sophia Papamichalopoulou	Cyprus	1:02.47	65	1:02.71	53	2:05.18	+22.29
54	87	Jacky Chamoun	Lebanon	1:09.41	69	1:08.62	54	2:18.03	+35.14
55	85	Marjan Kalhor	Iran	1:08.65	68	1:09.95	55	2:18.60	+35.71
	40	Jelena Lolović	Serbia	1:05.67	67	DNS			
	19	Chiara Costazza	Italy	53.18	25	DNF			
	13	Anja Pärson	Sweden	52.93	20	DNF			
	22	Michaela Kirchgasser	Austria	52.31	15	DNF			
	12	Fanny Chmelar	Germany	52.12	13	DNF			
	2	Susanne Riesch	Germany	51.46	4	DNF			
	34	Megan McJames	United States	54.41	35	DNF			
	35	Mona Løseth	Norway	54.53	37	DNF			
	46	Mireia Gutiérrez	Andorra	54.81	38	DNF			
	55	Anastasiya Skryabina	Ukraine	57.53	47	DNF			
	60	María Belén Simari Birkner	Argentina	58.99	54	DNF			
	56	Maja Klepić	Bosnia and Herzegovina	59.43	56	DNF			
	82	Ornella Oettl Reyes	Peru	59.61	57	DNF			
	67	Lizaveta Kuzmenka	Belarus	59.97	61	DNF			
	81	Xia Lina	China	1:10.60	70	DNF			
	10	Lindsey Vonn	United States	DNF					
	20	Sanni Leinonen	Finland	DNF					
	28	Claire Dautherives	France	DNF					
	41	Ana Drev	Slovenia	DNF					
	45	Petra Zakouřilová	Czech Republic	DNF					
	48	Maria Kirkova	Bulgaria	DNF					
	54	Chemmy Alcott	Great Britain	DNF					
	57	Marija Trmčić	Serbia	DNF					
	59	Andrea Jardi	Spain	DNF					
	62	Íris Guðmundsdóttir	Iceland	DNF					
	63	Sofie Juarez	Andorra	DNF					
	71	Nicol Gastaldi	Argentina	DNF					
	74	Gaia Bassani Antivari	Azerbaijan	DNF					
	75	Tuğba Daşdemir	Turkey	DNF					
	83	Kseniya Grigoreva	Uzbekistan	DNF					
	69	Kirsten McGarry	Ireland	DSQ					
	84	Ani-Matilda Serebrakian	Armenia	DSQ					
