= Alpine skiing at the 2010 Winter Olympics – Women's giant slalom =

Women's giant slalom at the XXI Olympic Winter Games
- Alpine skiing
- Venue: Whistler Creekside; Whistler, British Columbia; Canada
- Date: February 24 – 25, 2010
- Competitors: 86 from 47 nations
- Winning time: 2:27.11

Medalists
1st place, gold medalist(s)		Viktoria Rebensburg	Germany
2nd place, silver medalist(s)		Tina Maze	Slovenia
3rd place, bronze medalist(s)		Elisabeth Görgl	Austria

The women's giant slalom competition of the Vancouver 2010 Olympics was held at Whistler Creekside in Whistler, British Columbia, on February 24. Following the first run, the event was postponed due to heavy fog in the afternoon; the second run was held the next morning, February 25.

Viktoria Rebensburg of Germany won the gold medal, her first victory in international competition. Her previous best finish was second place at a GS a month earlier, her only World Cup podium.

== Results ==
Rank	Bib	Name	Country	Run 1	Rank	Run 2	Rank	Total	Difference
1st place, gold medalist(s)	2	Viktoria Rebensburg	Germany	1:15.47	6	1:11.64	7	2:27.11	
2nd place, silver medalist(s)	7	Tina Maze	Slovenia	1:15.39	5	1:11.76	11	2:27.15	+0.04
3rd place, bronze medalist(s)	16	Elisabeth Görgl	Austria	1:15.12	1	1:12.13	15	2:27.25	+0.14
4	19	Fabienne Suter	Switzerland	1:15.97	11	1:11.55	6	2:27.52	+0.41
5	4	Kathrin Zettel	Austria	1:15.28	3	1:12.25	19	2:27.53	+0.42
6	1	Kathrin Hölzl	Germany	1:15.81	10	1:11.77	12	2:27.58	+0.47
7	10	Eva-Maria Brem	Austria	1:15.38	4	1:12.24	18	2:27.62	+0.51
8	18	Julia Mancuso	United States	1:16.42	18	1:11.24	3	2:27.66	+0.55
9	8	Taïna Barioz	France	1:15.14	2	1:12.65	24	2:27.79	+0.68
10	12	Maria Riesch	Germany	1:15.60	7	1:12.37	20	2:27.97	+0.86
11	26	Anemone Marmottan	France	1:16.55	19	1:11.45	4	2:28.00	+0.89
12	22	Olivia Bertrand	France	1:16.32	17	1:11.81	13	2:28.13	+1.02
13	3	Tanja Poutiainen	Finland	1:16.16	13	1:12.01	14	2:28.17	+1.06
14	23	Sarah Schleper	United States	1:16.19	14	1:12.17	17	2:28.36	+1.25
15	15	Michaela Kirchgasser	Austria	1:16.26	15	1:12.14	16	2:28.40	+1.29
16	13	Tessa Worley	France	1:15.80	9	1:12.74	25	2:28.54	+1.43
17	5	Manuela Mölgg	Italy	1:15.79	8	1:12.87	26	2:28.66	+1.55
18	11	Federica Brignone	Italy	1:17.01	20	1:11.67	9	2:28.68	+1.57
19	36	Ana Drev	Slovenia	1:17.63	26	1:11.20	2	2:28.83	+1.72
20	21	Nicole Gius	Italy	1:17.16	21	1:11.71	10	2:28.87	+1.76
21	32	Marie-Michèle Gagnon	Canada	1:17.41	23	1:11.48	5	2:28.89	+1.78
22	9	Anja Pärson	Sweden	1:16.01	12	1:12.89	28	2:28.90	+1.79
23	14	Denise Karbon	Italy	1:18.22	30	1:11.15	1	2:29.37	+2.26
24	6	Maria Pietilä Holmner	Sweden	1:16.28	16	1:13.35	29	2:29.63	+2.52
25	39	Britt Janyk	Canada	1:18.13	29	1:11.66	8	2:29.79	+2.68
26	29	Kajsa Kling	Sweden	1:17.49	24	1:12.44	22	2:29.93	+2.82
27	24	Chemmy Alcott	Great Britain	1:17.53	25	1:12.41	21	2:29.94	+2.83
28	37	Shona Rubens	Canada	1:17.38	22	1:12.87	26	2:30.25	+3.14
29	31	Marie-Pier Préfontaine	Canada	1:18.01	27	1:12.50	23	2:30.51	+3.40
30	43	Sanni Leinonen	Finland	1:18.38	33	1:14.06	30	2:32.44	+5.33
31	25	Jessica Lindell-Vikarby	Sweden	1:18.34	32	1:14.37	31	2:32.71	+5.60
32	27	Megan McJames	United States	1:18.30	31	1:14.68	33	2:32.98	+5.87
33	41	Jelena Lolović	Serbia	1:20.03	39	1:14.51	32	2:34.54	+7.43
34	42	Carolina Ruiz Castillo	Spain	1:19.17	35	1:15.90	35	2:35.07	+7.96
35	53	Jana Gantnerová	Slovakia	1:20.00	38	1:15.73	34	2:35.73	+8.62
36	46	Tea Palić	Croatia	1:19.95	37	1:16.17	36	2:36.12	+9.01
37	38	Lyaysan Rayanova	Russia	1:20.37	41	1:16.58	38	2:36.95	+9.84
38	33	María José Rienda	Spain	1:21.22	45	1:16.23	37	2:37.45	+10.34
39	49	Nevena Ignjatović	Serbia	1:20.04	40	1:17.47	39	2:37.51	+10.40
40	59	Maria Shkanova	Belarus	1:22.18	46	1:18.20	41	2:40.38	+13.27
41	54	Žana Novaković	Bosnia and Herzegovina	1:22.77	48	1:18.02	40	2:40.79	+13.68
42	55	Anna Berecz	Hungary	1:22.29	47	1:18.58	43	2:40.87	+13.76
43	56	Chirine Njeim	Lebanon	1:23.28	50	1:18.33	42	2:41.61	+14.50
44	69	Bogdana Matsotska	Ukraine	1:23.04	49	1:18.94	46	2:41.98	+14.87
45	66	Macarena Simari Birkner	Argentina	1:23.29	51	1:18.73	44	2:42.02	+14.91
46	52	María Belén Simari Birkner	Argentina	1:23.60	52	1:18.78	45	2:42.38	+15.27
47	58	Yina Moe-Lange	Denmark	1:24.68	57	1:18.99	47	2:43.67	+16.56
48	62	Nicol Gastaldi	Argentina	1:24.25	54	1:19.53	48	2:43.78	+16.67
49	63	Kim Sun-Joo	South Korea	1:23.88	53	1:20.70	49	2:44.58	+17.47
50	61	Kirsten McGarry	Ireland	1:24.28	55	1:20.92	50	2:45.20	+18.09
51	74	Liene Fimbauere	Latvia	1:25.16	58	1:21.77	51	2:46.93	+19.82
52	80	Maja Klepić	Bosnia and Herzegovina	1:27.37	61	1:22.97	53	2:50.34	+23.23
53	76	Sophia Ralli	Greece	1:27.75	62	1:22.86	52	2:50.61	+23.50
54	72	Lizaveta Kuzmenka	Belarus	1:24.60	56	1:26.29	58	2:50.89	+23.78
55	84	Sophia Papamichalopoulou	Cyprus	1:28.38	64	1:23.48	54	2:51.86	+24.75
56	79	Tuğba Daşdemir	Turkey	1:28.37	63	1:25.10	55	2:53.47	+26.36
57	77	Gaia Bassani Antivari	Azerbaijan	1:30.82	66	1:26.05	57	2:56.87	+29.76
58	81	Kseniya Grigoreva	Uzbekistan	1:31.59	67	1:25.63	56	2:57.22	+30.11
59	73	Xia Lina	China	1:30.41	65	1:28.48	59	2:58.89	+31.78
60	85	Marjan Kalhor	Iran	1:36.87	68	1:28.52	60	3:05.39	+38.28
	20	Šárka Záhrobská	Czech Republic	1:18.06	28	DNS			
	35	Veronika Zuzulová	Slovakia	1:18.96	34	DNS			
	44	Ana Jelušić	Croatia	1:20.62	44	DNS			
	45	Nika Fleiss	Croatia	1:19.75	36	DNS			
	48	Andrea Jardi	Spain	1:20.41	42	DNF			
	51	Mireia Gutiérrez	Andorra	1:20.61	43	DNF			
	70	Noelle Barahona	Chile	1:26.76	59	DNF			
	86	Ornella Oettl Reyes	Peru	1:27.25	60	DNF			
	17	Lindsey Vonn	United States	DNF					
	28	Mona Løseth	Norway	DNF					
	30	Agnieszka Gąsienica-Daniel	Poland	DNF					
	34	Andrea Dettling	Switzerland	DNF					
	40	Elena Prosteva	Russia	DNF					
	47	Matea Ferk	Croatia	DNF					
	50	Alexandra Coletti	Monaco	DNF					
	57	Zsófia Döme	Hungary	DNF					
	60	Maya Harrisson	Brazil	DNF					
	64	Sofie Juarez	Andorra	DNF					
	65	Maria Kirkova	Bulgaria	DNF					
	68	Tiiu Nurmberg	Estonia	DNF					
	71	Petra Zakouřilová	Czech Republic	DNF					
	75	Cynthia Denzler	Colombia	DNF					
	78	Nino Tsiklauri	Georgia	DNF					
	82	Lyudmila Fedotova	Kazakhstan	DNF					
	83	Ani-Matilda Serebrakian	Armenia	DNF					
	67	Anastasiya Skryabina	Ukraine	DSQ					
