= Alpine skiing at the 2010 Winter Olympics – Men's combined =

Men's combined at the XXI Olympic Winter Games
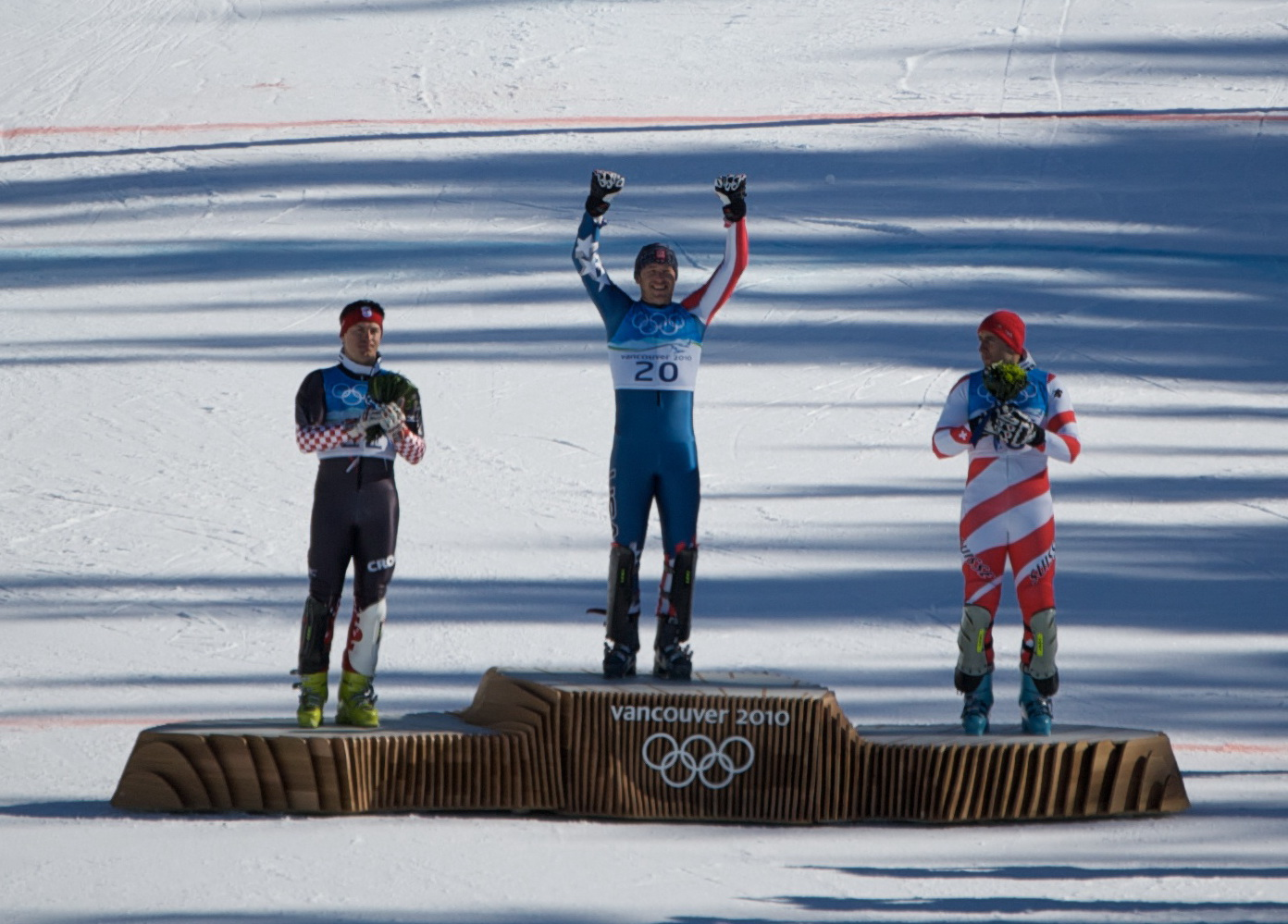
- The on-hill podium ceremony. From left: Ivica Kostelić (silver), Bode Miller (gold) and Silvan Zurbriggen (bronze)
- Venue: Whistler Creekside; Whistler, British Columbia; Canada
- Date: February 21, 2010
- Competitors: 52 from 22 nations
- Winning time: 2:44.92

Medalists
1st place, gold medalist(s)		Bode Miller	United States
2nd place, silver medalist(s)		Ivica Kostelić	Croatia
3rd place, bronze medalist(s)		Silvan Zurbriggen	Switzerland

The men's super combined competition of the Vancouver 2010 Olympics was held at Whistler Creekside in Whistler, British Columbia. The competition was scheduled for February 16, but was postponed due to weather delays in preceding races; it was held five days later on February 21. American athlete Bode Miller won his only Olympic gold medal, Ivica Kostelić of Croatia won silver, and Silvan Zurbriggen of Switzerland took the bronze.

One major change in this event for the 2010 Olympics was the switch from a traditional dedicated "combined" (K), taking place over one or two days and involving a downhill run and two slalom runs (as the combined had been since its reintroduction to the Olympics in 1988), to a one-day "super combined" (SC), consisting of a downhill run in the morning and one slalom run in the afternoon. The super combined format lessens the advantage of the slalom specialists.

== Results ==
Rank	Bib	Name	Country	Downhill	Rank	Slalom	Rank	Total	Differential
1st place, gold medalist(s)	20	Bode Miller	United States	1:53.91	7	51.01	3	2:44.92	
2nd place, silver medalist(s)	22	Ivica Kostelić	Croatia	1:54.20	9	51.05	6	2:45.25	+0.33
3rd place, bronze medalist(s)	16	Silvan Zurbriggen	Switzerland	1:53.88	6	51.44	10	2:45.32	+0.40
4	17	Carlo Janka	Switzerland	1:53.65	3	51.89	12	2:45.54	+0.62
5	3	Ted Ligety	United States	1:55.06	15	50.76	1	2:45.82	+0.90
6	21	Benjamin Raich	Austria	1:54.70	12	51.43	9	2:46.13	+1.21
7	9	Ondřej Bank	Czech Republic	1:55.17	16	51.02	4	2:46.19	+1.27
8	8	Christof Innerhofer	Italy	1:54.55	10	51.90	13	2:46.45	+1.53
9	12	Kjetil Jansrud	Norway	1:55.44	18	51.06	7	2:46.50	+1.58
10	33	Will Brandenburg	United States	1:56.28	27	50.78	2	2:47.06	+2.14
11	6	Andrew Weibrecht	United States	1:55.23	17	52.35	19	2:47.58	+2.66
12	26	Adrien Theaux	France	1:55.05	14	52.92	24	2:47.97	+3.05
13	29	Dominik Paris	Italy	1:53.54	2	54.45	29	2:47.99	+3.07
14	15	Sandro Viletta	Switzerland	1:55.72	21	52.47	20	2:48.19	+3.27
15	4	Ryan Semple	Canada	1:56.13	26	52.13	16	2:48.26	+3.34
16	24	Markus Larsson	Sweden	1:56.51	30	51.79	11	2:48.30	+3.38
17	25	Kryštof Krýzl	Czech Republic	1:56.06	23	52.25	18	2:48.31	+3.39
18	11	Julien Lizeroux	France	1:57.18	35	51.18	8	2:48.36	+3.44
19	7	Thomas Mermillod-Blondin	France	1:56.50	29	52.12	15	2:48.62	+3.70
20	18	Natko Zrnčić-Dim	Croatia	1:54.87	13	53.99	27	2:48.86	+3.94
21	28	Aleksandr Khoroshilov	Russia	1:56.77	34	52.51	21	2:49.28	+4.36
22	38	Truls Ove Karlsen	Norway	1:57.32	37	51.99	14	2:49.31	+4.39
23	45	Stepan Zuev	Russia	1:57.23	36	52.52	22	2:49.75	+4.83
24	23	Stephan Keppler	Germany	1:56.09	24	53.70	25	2:49.79	+4.87
25	40	Roger Vidosa	Andorra	1:57.48	38	52.85	23	2:50.33	+5.41
26	48	Michael Janyk	Canada	1:59.75	43	51.02	4	2:50.77	+5.85
27	32	Andrej Jerman	Slovenia	1:56.03	22	54.81	31	2:50.84	+5.92
28	41	Filip Trejbal	Czech Republic	1:58.62	41	52.23	17	2:50.85	+5.93
29	36	Edward Drake	Great Britain	1:56.63	33	54.28	28	2:50.91	+5.99
30	35	Louis-Pierre Hélie	Canada	1:56.58	31	55.00	32	2:51.58	+6.66
31	34	Martin Vráblík	Czech Republic	1:58.54	40	53.92	26	2:52.46	+7.54
32	43	Tyler Nella	Canada	1:56.60	32	56.05	33	2:52.65	+7.73
33	49	Igor Zakurdaev	Kazakhstan	1:58.95	42	57.25	34	2:56.20	+11.28
34	51	Stefan Georgiev	Bulgaria	2:02.77	46	54.64	30	2:57.41	+12.49
	31	Georg Streitberger	Austria	1:55.55	20	DNS			
	1	Peter Fill	Italy	1:54.15	8	DNF			
	2	Hans Olsson	Sweden	1:53.83	5	DNF			
	10	Didier Défago	Switzerland	1:53.69	4	DNF			
	13	Aksel Lund Svindal	Norway	1:53.15	1	DNF			
	14	Manfred Mölgg	Italy	1:58.29	39	DNF			
	27	Andrej Šporn	Slovenia	1:54.56	11	DNF			
	30	Lars Elton Myhre	Norway	1:55.44	18	DNF			
	39	Andrej Križaj	Slovenia	1:56.48	28	DNF			
	42	Andreas Romar	Finland	2:00.89	45	DNF			
	44	Ferran Terra	Spain	1:56.12	25	DNF			
	46	Cristian Javier Simari Birkner	Argentina	2:00.58	44	DNF			
	5	Johan Clarey	France	DNF					
	19	Romed Baumann	Austria	DNF					
	37	Ivan Ratkić	Croatia	DNF					
	47	Jaroslav Babušiak	Slovakia	DNF					
	50	Kevin Esteve Rigail	Andorra	DNF					
	52	Roberts Rode	Latvia	DNF					

== See also ==
- Alpine skiing at the 2010 Winter Paralympics – Men's combined
