= Andorra at the 2014 Winter Olympics =

- IOC code: AND
- NOC: Andorran Olympic Committee
- Website: (in Catalan)

in Sochi
- Competitors: 6 in 3 sports
- Flag bearers: Mireia Gutiérrez (opening); Laure Soulie (closing)
- Medals: Gold 0 Silver 0 Bronze 0 Total 0

Winter Olympics appearances (overview)
- 1976; 1980; 1984; 1988; 1992; 1994; 1998; 2002; 2006; 2010; 2014; 2018; 2022; 2026

Andorra competed at the 2014 Winter Olympics in Sochi, Russia, from 7 to 23 February 2014. The Andorran team consisted of six athletes in three sports.

== Alpine skiing ==
According to the final quota allocation released on 20 January 2014, Andorra had five athletes in qualification position. The final team was announced with four athletes, meaning the country decided to reject one of its quota spots.

Athlete	Event	Run 1		Run 2		Total	
Athlete	Event	Time	Rank	Time	Rank	Time	Rank
Kevin Esteve	Men's downhill	—N/a				2:10.80	32
Marc Oliveras	Men's combined	1:57.08	33	1:01.46	32	2:58.54	31
Marc Oliveras	Men's downhill	—N/a				2:12.76	40
Marc Oliveras	Men's giant slalom	1:26.40	41	1:27.34	39	2:53.74	38
Marc Oliveras	Men's super-G	—N/a				1:22.02	35
Joan Verdu Sanchez	Men's giant slalom	DNF					
Mireia Gutierrez	Women's combined	1:49.04	32	53.26	15	2:42.30	18
Mireia Gutierrez	Women's giant slalom	DNF					
Mireia Gutierrez	Women's slalom	DNF					

== Biathlon ==
Reallocation of quotas, allowed Andorra to enter one female athlete. Laure Soulie was officially announced as a member of the team on 24 January 2014.

Athlete	Event	Time	Misses	Rank
Laure Soulie	Women's individual	50:04.2	3 (1+1+0+1)	48
Laure Soulie	Women's sprint	23:57.8	2 (1+1)	66

== Snowboarding ==
According to the final quota allocation released on 20 January 2014, Andorra had one athlete in qualification position. The final team was announced on 24 January 2014. Tarroch was disqualified in the round of 39, and thus finished a joint 25th.

Athlete	Event	Seeding		Round of 39	Quarterfinal	Semifinal	Final	
Athlete	Event	Time	Rank	Position	Position	Position	Position	Rank
Lluis Marin Tarroch	Men's snowboard cross	CAN		DSQ	Did not advance			=25

== Non-qualified sports ==
=== Cross-country skiing ===
According to the quota allocation released on 20 January 2014, Andorra had one athlete in qualification position. However the final team did not include the qualified athlete, Irineu Esteve Altimiras.
