= Alpine skiing at the 2010 Winter Olympics – Men's downhill =

Men's downhill at the XXI Olympic Winter Games
- Alpine skiing
- Venue: Whistler Creekside
- Date: February 15, 2010
- Competitors: 64 from 28 nations
- Winning time: 1:54.31

Medalists
1st place, gold medalist(s)		Didier Défago	Switzerland
2nd place, silver medalist(s)		Aksel Lund Svindal	Norway
3rd place, bronze medalist(s)		Bode Miller	United States

Men's Downhill
- Interactive map of Men's Downhill
- Location: Whistler Creekside; Dave Murray Downhill
- Vertical: 853 m (2,799 ft)
- Top elevation: 1,678 m (5,505 ft)
- Base elevation: 825 m (2,707 ft)

The Men's Downhill competition of the Vancouver 2010 Olympics was held at Whistler Creekside in Whistler, British Columbia. The competition was scheduled for Saturday, February 13, but was postponed due to rain and warm temperatures; it was held on Monday, February 15.

The defending Olympic champion was Antoine Dénériaz of France and the reigning world champion was John Kucera of Canada; neither competed as Dénériaz had retired and Kucera was out for the season with a broken leg. Austrian Michael Walchhofer was the defending World Cup downhill champion and Didier Cuche of Switzerland led the current season, ahead of teammate Carlo Janka and Walchhofer.

Switzerland's Didier Défago won the gold medal, Aksel Lund Svindal of Norway took the silver, and the bronze medalist was Bode Miller of the United States; Cuche was sixth, Walchhofer tenth, and Janka eleventh.

The vertical drop of the Dave Murray Downhill course was 853 m (2,799 ft), starting at an elevation of 1,678 m (5,505 ft) above sea level, with a length of 3.105 km (1.929 mi). Défago's winning time of 114.31 seconds yielded an average course speed of 97.787 km/h (60.8 mph), with an average vertical descent speed of 7.462 m/s (24.5 ft/s).

This was the seventeenth edition of the men's downhill at the Olympics and the time margins between the medalists were the closest in history; only 0.09 seconds separated gold and bronze.

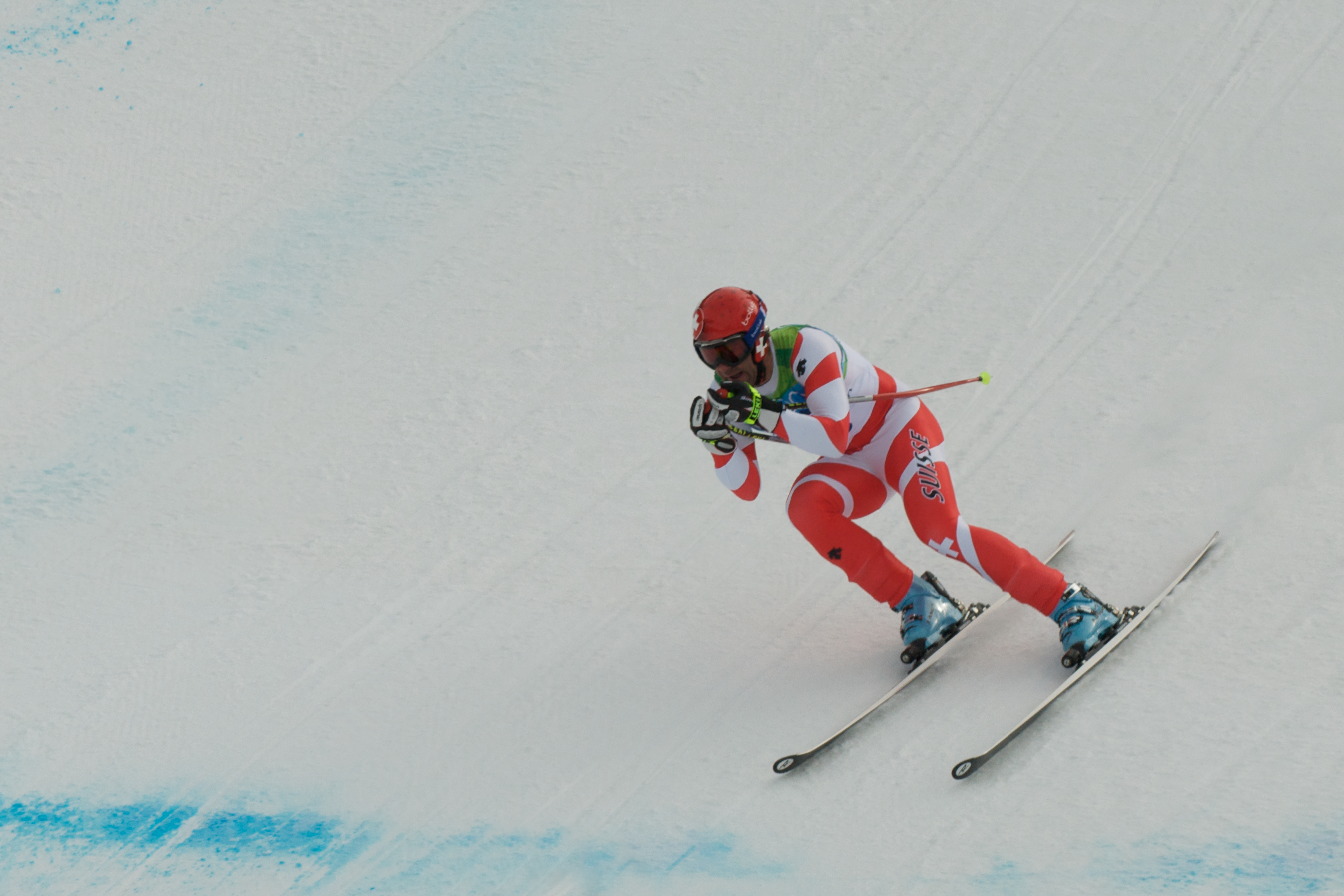
Didier Défago winning gold

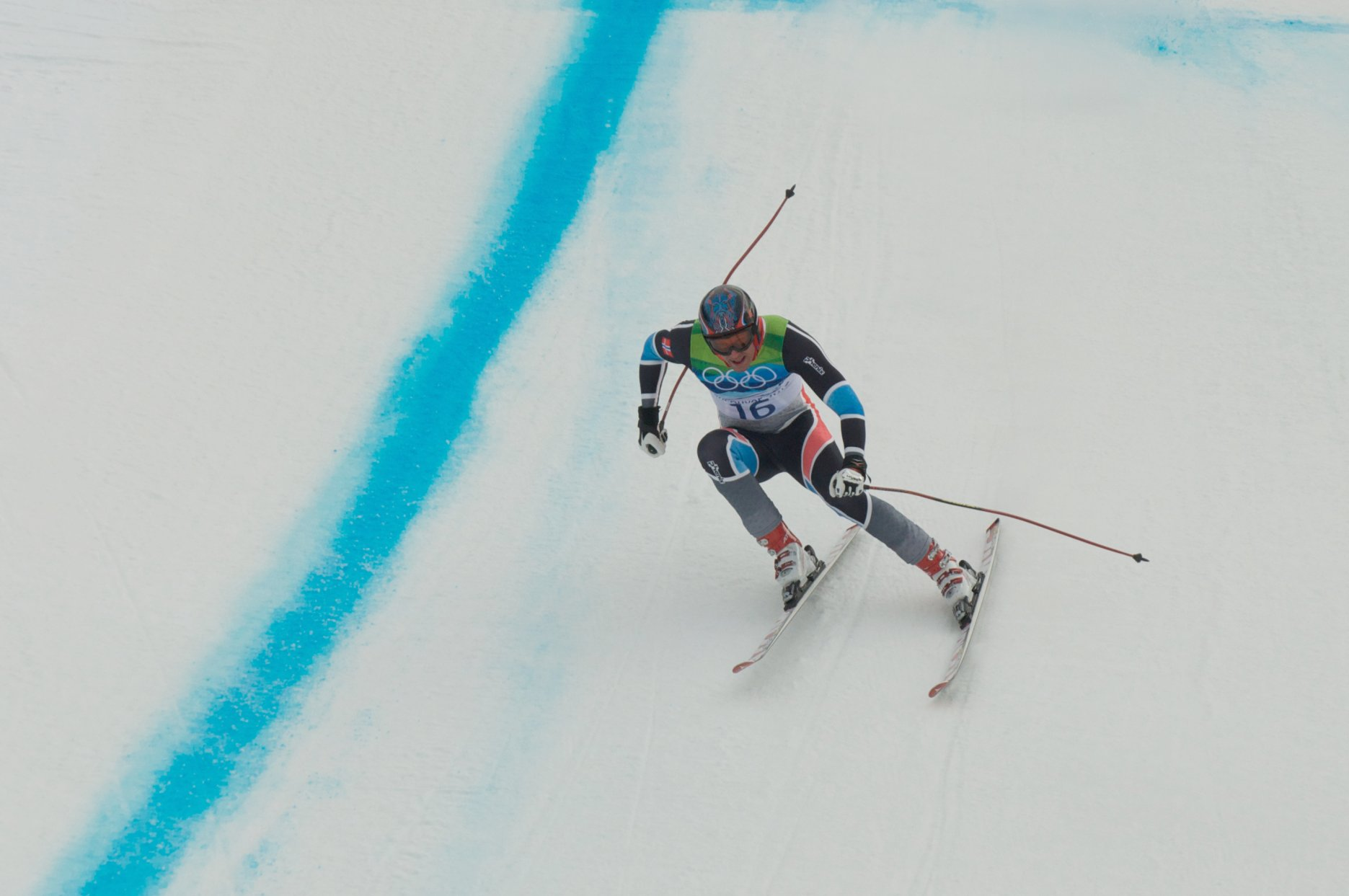
Aksel Lund Svindal racing for the silver medal

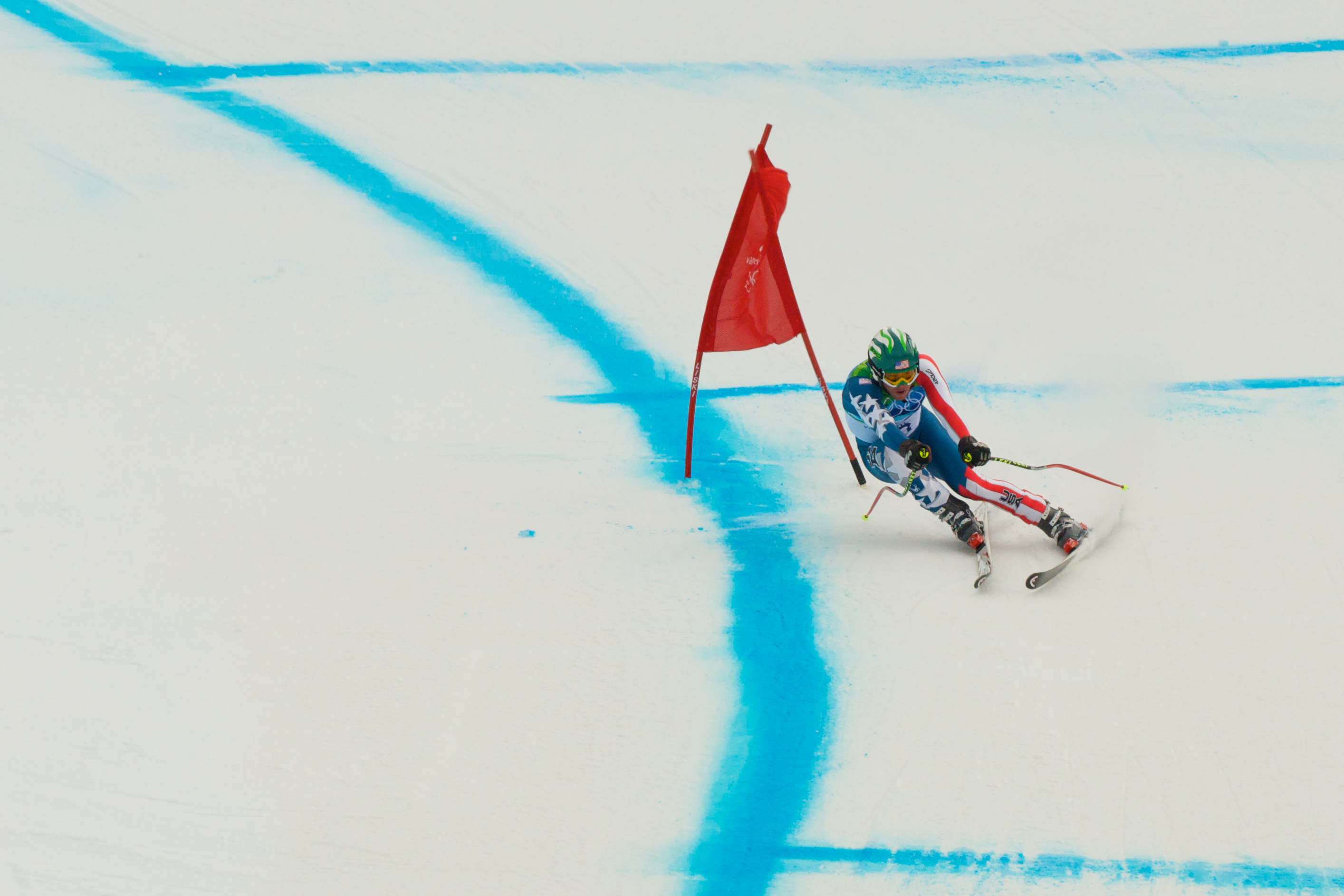
Bode Miller, the bronze medalist

== Results ==
The race was started at 10:30 local time, (UTC −8). At the starting gate, the skies were cloudy, the temperature was −1.9 °C (28.6 °F), and the snow condition was granular; the temperature at the finish was 2.5 °C (36.5 °F).

Rank	Bib	Name	Country	Time	Difference
1st place, gold medalist(s)	18	Didier Défago	Switzerland	1:54.31	0.00
2nd place, silver medalist(s)	16	Aksel Lund Svindal	Norway	1:54.38	+0.07
3rd place, bronze medalist(s)	8	Bode Miller	United States	1:54.40	+0.09
4	15	Mario Scheiber	Austria	1:54.52	+0.21
5	9	Erik Guay	Canada	1:54.64	+0.33
6	22	Didier Cuche	Switzerland	1:54.67	+0.36
7	3	David Poisson	France	1:54.82	+0.51
8	10	Marco Büchel	Liechtenstein	1:54.84	+0.53
9	13	Klaus Kröll	Austria	1:54.87	+0.56
10	17	Michael Walchhofer	Austria	1:54.88	+0.57
11	20	Carlo Janka	Switzerland	1:55.02	+0.71
12	11	Hans Olsson	Sweden	1:55.19	+0.88
12	21	Werner Heel	Italy	1:55.19	+0.88
14	33	Rok Perko	Slovenia	1:55.26	+0.95
15	25	Peter Fill	Italy	1:55.29	+0.98
16	26	Adrien Theaux	France	1:55.40	+1.09
17	19	Manuel Osborne-Paradis	Canada	1:55.44	+1.13
18	30	Ivica Kostelić	Croatia	1:55.49	+1.18
19	24	Christof Innerhofer	Italy	1:55.58	+1.27
20	6	Steven Nyman	United States	1:55.71	+1.40
21	4	Andrew Weibrecht	United States	1:55.74	+1.43
22	2	Hans Grugger	Austria	1:55.81	+1.50
23	14	Ambrosi Hoffmann	Switzerland	1:56.04	+1.73
24	32	Stephan Keppler	Germany	1:56.11	+1.80
25	31	Jan Hudec	Canada	1:56.19	+1.88
26	34	Guillermo Fayed	France	1:56.20	+1.89
27	28	Johan Clarey	France	1:56.29	+1.98
28	12	Andrej Jerman	Slovenia	1:56.35	+2.04
29	1	Patrik Järbyn	Sweden	1:56.58	+2.27
30	38	Ondřej Bank	Czech Republic	1:56.66	+2.35
31	36	Kjetil Jansrud	Norway	1:56.69	+2.38
31	42	Lars Elton Myhre	Norway	1:56.69	+2.38
33	5	Natko Zrnčić-Dim	Croatia	1:57.02	+2.71
34	39	Craig Branch	Australia	1:57.19	+2.88
35	29	Patrick Staudacher	Italy	1:57.21	+2.90
36	35	Petr Záhrobský	Czech Republic	1:57.44	+3.13
37	40	Andrej Križaj	Slovenia	1:57.72	+3.41
38	43	Edward Drake	Great Britain	1:57.91	+3.60
39	45	Jono Brauer	Australia	1:58.08	+3.77
40	48	Kryštof Krýzl	Czech Republic	1:58.43	+4.12
41	52	Ivan Ratkić	Croatia	1:58.58	+4.27
42	37	Andreas Romar	Finland	1:58.71	+4.40
43	50	Markus Larsson	Sweden	1:58.82	+4.51
44	41	Ferran Terra	Spain	1:58.85	+4.54
45	51	Aleksandr Khoroshilov	Russia	1:59.21	+4.90
46	55	Truls Ove Karlsen	Norway	1:59.52	+5.21
47	54	Kevin Esteve Rigail	Andorra	1:59.61	+5.30
48	58	Roger Vidosa	Andorra	1:59.65	+5.34
49	44	Maui Gayme	Chile	1:59.76	+5.45
50	46	Igor Zakurdaev	Kazakhstan	1:59.80	+5.49
51	49	Paul de la Cuesta	Spain	1:59.84	+5.53
52	59	Jaroslav Babušiak	Slovakia	1:59.99	+5.68
53	56	Johnny Albertsen	Denmark	2:00.12	+5.81
54	63	Stepan Zuev	Russia	2:00.58	+6.27
55	47	Cristian Javier Simari Birkner	Argentina	2:01.67	+7.36
56	61	Jorge Mandru	Chile	2:01.72	+7.41
57	53	Filip Trejbal	Czech Republic	2:02.57	+8.26
58	57	Roberts Rode	Latvia	2:03.36	+9.05
59	64	Andrei Drygin	Tajikistan	2:04.44	+10.13
	7	Andrej Šporn	Slovenia	DNF	
	23	Robbie Dixon	Canada	DNF	
	60	Dragoș Staicu	Romania	DNF	
	62	Stefan Georgiev	Bulgaria	DNF	
	27	Marco Sullivan	United States	DSQ	
