= Andorra at the 2010 Winter Olympics =

- IOC code: AND
- NOC: Andorran Olympic Committee

in Vancouver
- Competitors: 6 in 3 sports
- Flag bearer: Lluís Marin Tarroch
- Medals: Gold 0 Silver 0 Bronze 0 Total 0

Winter Olympics appearances (overview)
- 1976; 1980; 1984; 1988; 1992; 1994; 1998; 2002; 2006; 2010; 2014; 2018; 2022; 2026

Andorra sent a delegation to compete in the 2010 Winter Olympics held in Vancouver, British Columbia, Canada, from 12 to 28 February 2010. Andorra has never won an Olympic medal, despite appearing at every Winter and Summer Games since 1976. The Andorran delegation to these Olympics consisted of six athletes, four in alpine skiing, one in cross-country skiing, and one in snowboarding, the last being Lluís Marin Tarroch, the first snowboarder to represent Andorra at the Olympics. He placed 34th in his only event, and failed to advance to the quarterfinals as a result. Francesc Soulié, the first Andorran cross-country skier to compete at the Games, made his second Olympics appearance, achieving a 47th place finish in the best of his three events. The four alpine skiers that competed recorded six DNFs in their thirteen combined events, though Mireia Gutiérrez recorded a team-high 24th-place result in her best event.

== Background ==
The Winter Olympics were first held in 1924, and since then had grown to include 86 events covering 7 different winter sports. The Andorran Olympic Committee was recognized by the International Olympic Committee on 31 December 1974. They first participated in Olympic competition at the 1976 Winter Olympics and have taken part in every Summer and Winter Olympics since. Coming into 2010, Andorra had never won a medal in either the Summer or Winter Olympics. Competition in Vancouver, British Columbia, lasted from 12 to 28 February 2010. The bidding process to host the competition was won by Vancouver on the second ballot, defeating eventual 2018 hosts Pyongchang. Andorra's delegation made up six of the 2,626 total athletes competing, with 82 nations represented.

The Andorran delegation to Vancouver consisted of six athletes, four in alpine skiing, one in cross-country skiing, and one in snowboarding. Lluís Marin Tarroch, the snowboarder, was chosen as the flag bearer for the opening ceremony, while alpine skier Mireia Gutiérrez was selected to carry the flag for the closing ceremony. Alpine skiers Sofie Juarez, Kevin Esteve Rigail, and Roger Vidosa, and cross-country skier Francesc Soulié, comprised the rest of the Andorran delegation.

== Alpine skiing ==
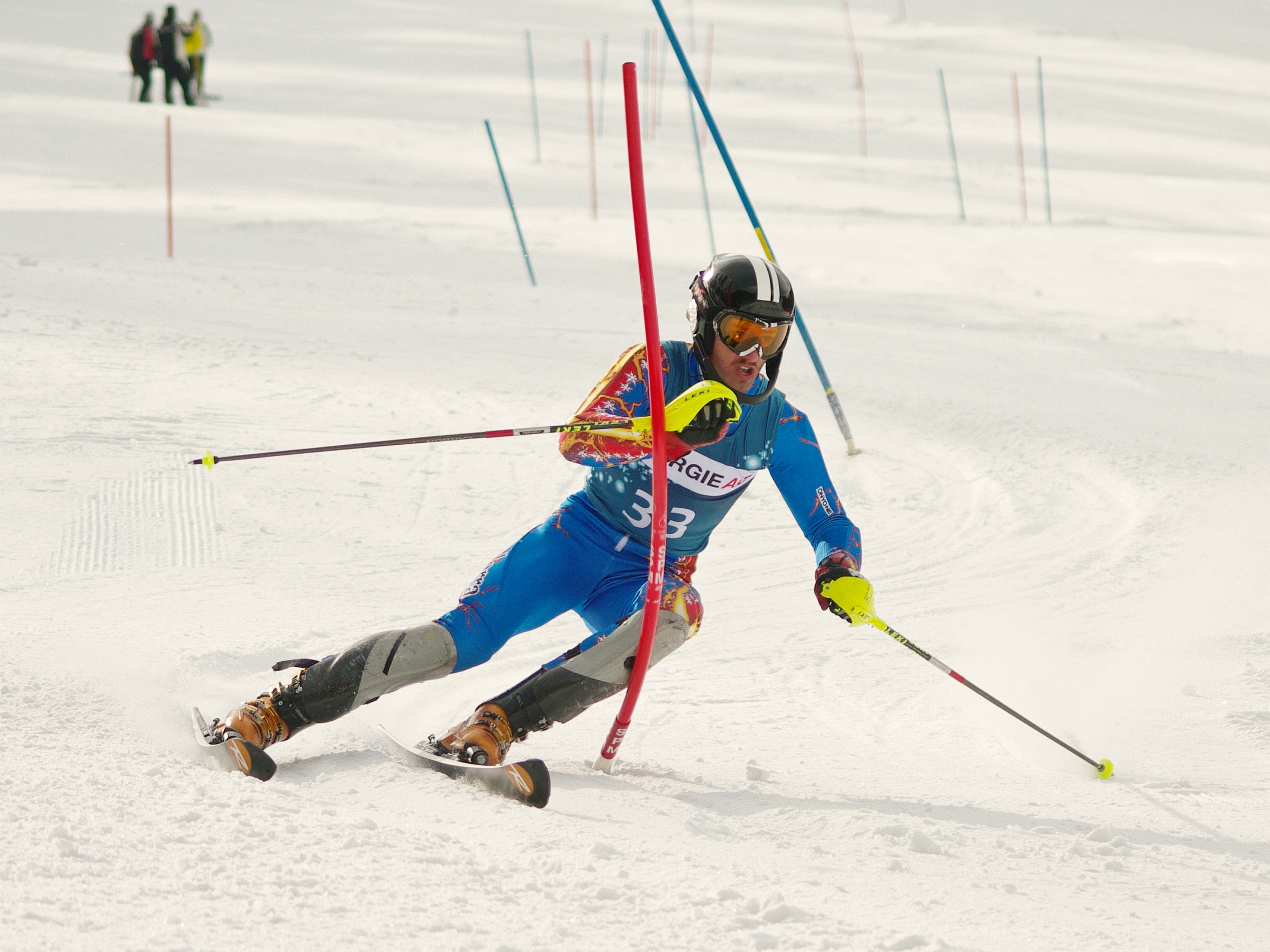
Roger Vidosa competed in four events in what would be his second and final Olympic Games.

The Andorran alpine skiing team consisted of four members: Mireia Gutiérrez, in her first Games at age 21, Sofie Juarez, in her first Games at age 18, Kevin Esteve Rigail, in his first Games at age 20, and Roger Vidosa, in his second Games at age 25. On the women's side, Gutiérrez competed in four events, while Juarez competed in two. Both women competed in the giant slalom, though neither finished the race; the latter was not able to finish her other event, the slalom, either. Gutiérrez recorded a DNF in the super-G, but finished in 28th position in the downhill race and in 24th in the combined race, the latter of which was the best finish for an Andorran in any event at the 2010 Games. The men's side had a bit more overlap, as Esteve was joined by Vidosa in all three of his events. The pair finished side-by-side—47th and 48th—and separated by only 0.04 seconds in the downhill event, while Vidosa finished ahead of Esteve by six spots in the super-G. Vidosa finished in 25th position in the combined race, but Esteve was one of 18 competitors not to finish. In addition, Vidosa competed in the giant slalom event, but recorded a DNF.

Of the four competitors, two would go on to compete in another Olympic Games – Esteve competed in one event in 2014, and Gutiérrez competed in three and one events in 2014 and 2018, respectively.

Athlete	Event	Time	Rank
Mireia Gutiérrez	Women's downhill	1:52.87	28
Mireia Gutiérrez	Women's combined	1:29.16	24
Mireia Gutiérrez	Women's super-G	DNF	
Mireia Gutiérrez	Women's giant slalom	DNF	
Sofie Juarez	Women's slalom	DNF	
Sofie Juarez	Women's giant slalom	DNF	
Kevin Esteve Rigail	Men's downhill	1:59.61	47
Kevin Esteve Rigail	Men's combined	DNF	
Kevin Esteve Rigail	Men's super-G	1:35.67	39
Roger Vidosa	Men's downhill	1:59.65	48
Roger Vidosa	Men's combined	2:50.33	25
Roger Vidosa	Men's super-G	1:33.65	33
Roger Vidosa	Men's giant slalom	DNF	

== Cross-country skiing ==
The first cross-country skier to represent Andorra in the Winter Olympics (and the only one until Irineu Esteve Altimiras in 2018), Francesc Soulié competed in his second Games in 2010 at the age of 31. Both of Soulié's two distance races did not include qualifiers, but rather one single event that functioned as a final. In the 15 km race, he finished in 73rd place out of the 95 competitors to start the race, nearly five minutes behind the gold medalist, while in the 50 km race he placed 47th out of the 53 skiers to start, though only 48 finished the race. In his lone non-distance event, the men's sprint, Soulié was eliminated after placing 56th in the field of 62 competitors during the qualification stage, in which only the top 30 skiers advanced to the quarterfinals. As of 2018, this was Soulié's last appearance at an Olympic Games.

Athlete	Event	Qualifying		Quarterfinal		Semifinal		Final	
Athlete	Event	Total	Rank	Total	Rank	Total	Rank	Total	Rank
Francesc Soulié	Men's 15 km freestyle							38:36.0	73
Francesc Soulié	Men's sprint	3:55.22	56	Did not advance					
Francesc Soulié	Men's 50 km classical							2:25:00.8	47

== Snowboarding ==
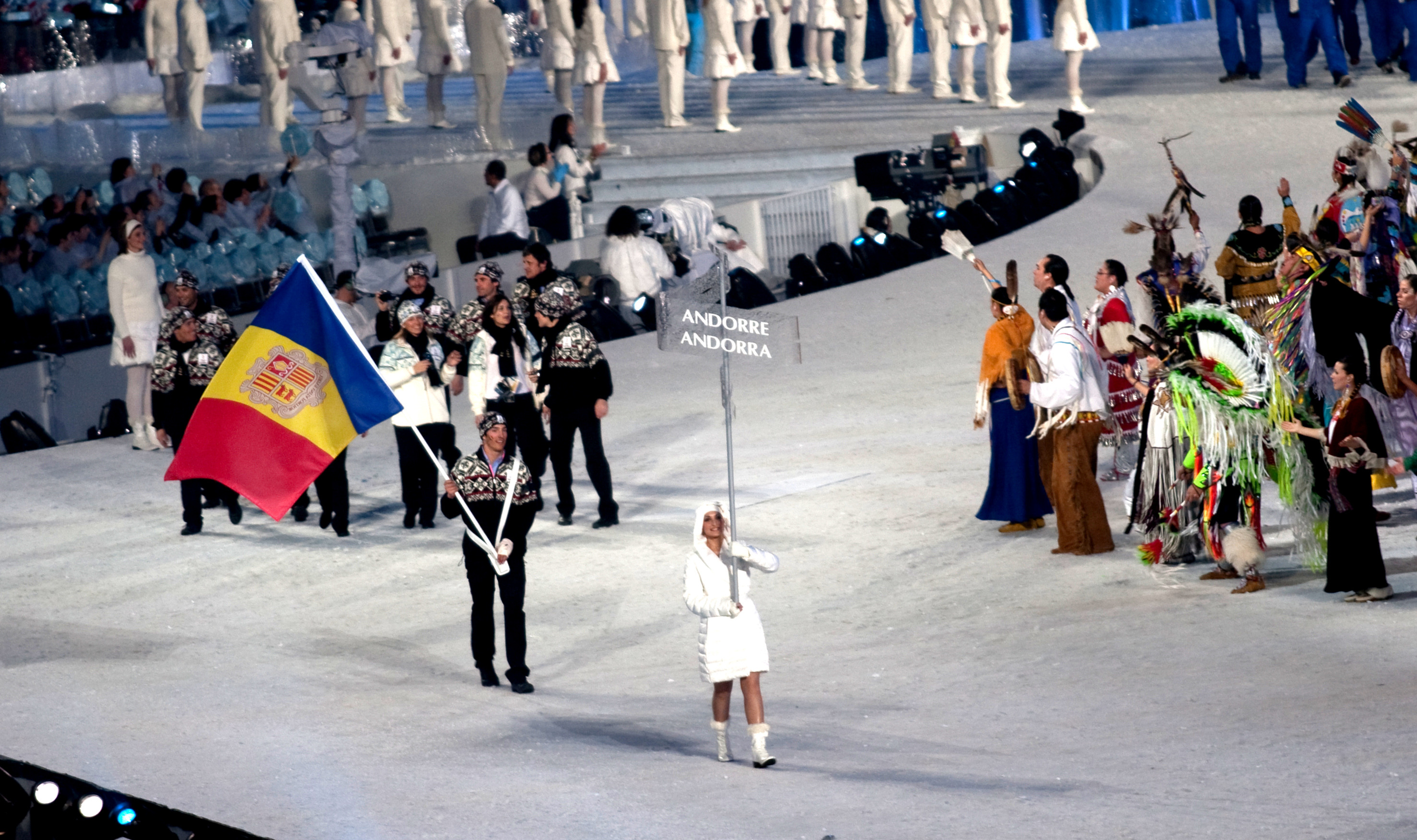
Andorran athletes entering the stadium during the opening ceremonies, led by flagbearer Lluís Marin Tarroch.

Lluís Marin Tarroch became the first, and as of the 2018 Winter Olympics, only snowboarder to represent Andorra at the Olympics. Tarroch was 21 years old at the time of the Vancouver Olympics. In the men's snowboard cross, the qualifying round was held on 15 February. The format was that everyone got two races, and the best of an athlete's two times counted. The top 32 would advance to the next round. Tarroch did not finish the first run, and had to rely on his second run time of 1 minute and 47.36 seconds, which put him in 34th place, and he was eliminated. He would go on to represent Andorra at the 2014 and 2018 Winter Olympics.

Athlete	Event	Qualification		1/8 round	Quarterfinal	Semifinal	Final
Athlete	Event	Time	Rank	Rank	Rank	Rank	Rank
Lluís Marin Tarroch	Men's snowboard cross	1:47.36	34	Did not advance			

== See also ==
- Andorra at the Olympics
- Andorra at the 2010 Winter Paralympics
