= Alpine skiing at the 2014 Winter Olympics – Men's downhill =

Men's downhill at the XXII Olympic Winter Games
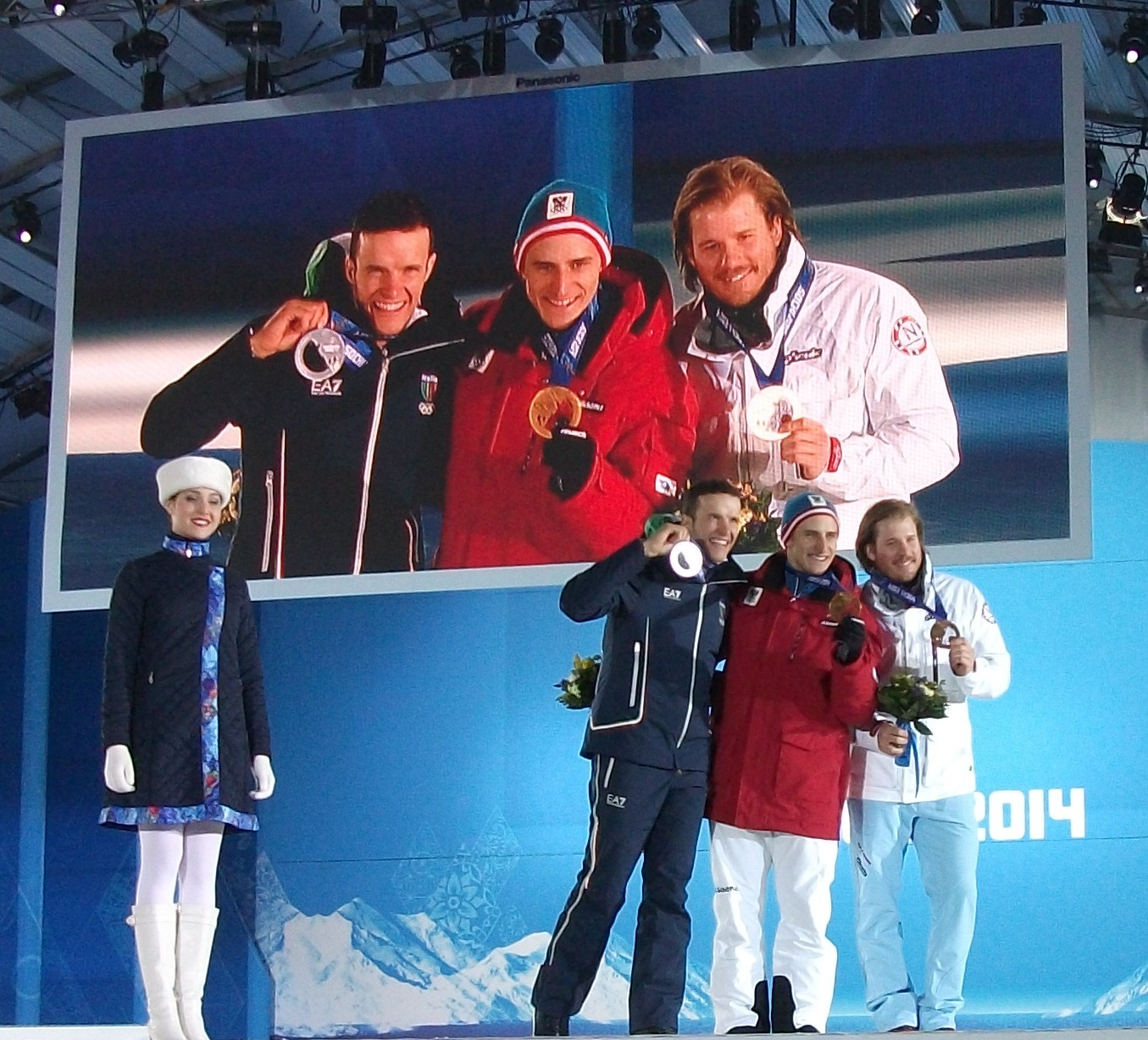
- Medalists
- Venue: Rosa Khutor Alpine Resort; Krasnaya Polyana, Russia
- Date: 9 February 2014
- Competitors: 49 from 24 nations
- Winning time: 2:06.23

Medalists
1st place, gold medalist(s)		Matthias Mayer	Austria
2nd place, silver medalist(s)		Christof Innerhofer	Italy
3rd place, bronze medalist(s)		Kjetil Jansrud	Norway

Men's Downhill
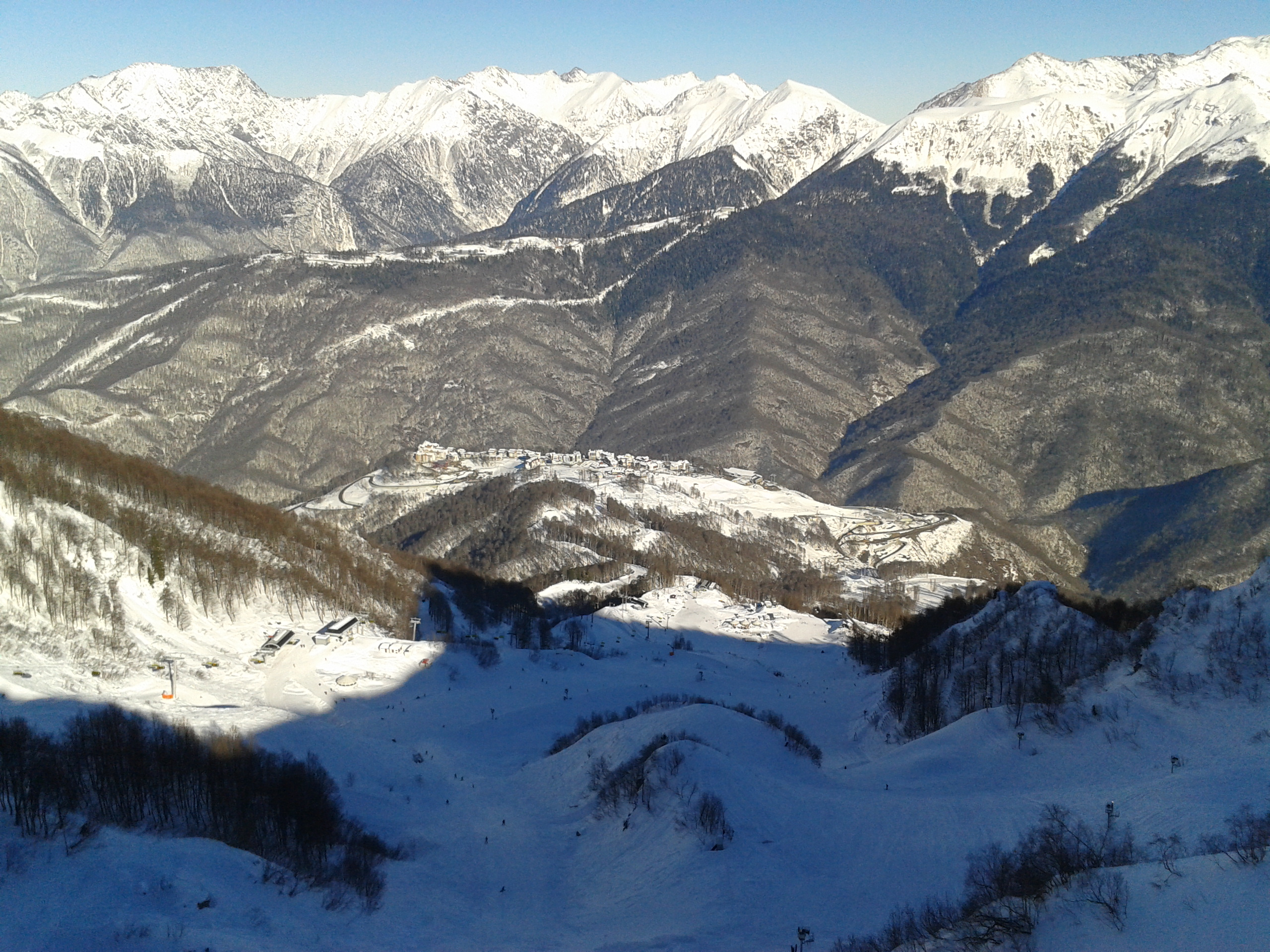
- Location: Rosa Khutor
- Vertical: 1,075 m (3,527 ft)
- Top elevation: 2,045 m (6,709 ft)
- Base elevation: 970 m (3,182 ft)

The men's downhill competition of the 2014 Winter Olympics was held at Rosa Khutor Alpine Resort near Krasnaya Polyana, Russia, on 9 February at 11:15 MSK. The race course was longer than average at 3.495 km (2.17 mi), with a vertical drop of 1,075 m (3,527 ft).

== Summary ==
The defending champion was Didier Défago from Switzerland. Aksel Lund Svindal, silver medalist in 2010, and bronze medalist Bode Miller also participated, with Miller posting the best training time. None of the 2010 medalists returned to the podium.

Matthias Mayer of Austria won the gold medal, with Christof Innerhofer from Italy in second and Kjetil Jansrud from Norway taking bronze. Mayer had an average speed of 99.675 km/h (61.94 mph) and an average vertical descent rate of 8.516 m/s (27.94 ft/s).

Third racer on the course was Carlo Janka, who took the early lead, soon pushed to the third position by Travis Ganong and immediately after him by Jansrud. Starting 11th, Mayer overtook Jansrud by 0.10 seconds, and Svindal was 0.19 behind Jansrud. Innerhofer was ahead of Mayer's pace in the first half of the course, but fell back and finished 0.06 seconds behind Mayer, pushing Jansrud to the bronze medal position. No competitor after Innerhofer, including Défago, finished in the top nine.

== Results ==
The race was started at 11:15 local time, (UTC+4). At the starting gate, the skies were partly cloudy, the temperature was −2.0 °C (28.4 °F), and the snow condition was hard.

Rank	Bib	Name	Country	Time	Difference
1st place, gold medalist(s)	11	Matthias Mayer	Austria	2:06.23	—
2nd place, silver medalist(s)	20	Christof Innerhofer	Italy	2:06.29	+0.06
3rd place, bronze medalist(s)	8	Kjetil Jansrud	Norway	2:06.33	+0.10
4	18	Aksel Lund Svindal	Norway	2:06.52	+0.29
5	7	Travis Ganong	United States	2:06.64	+0.41
6	3	Carlo Janka	Switzerland	2:06.71	+0.48
7	14	Peter Fill	Italy	2:06.72	+0.49
8	15	Bode Miller	United States	2:06.75	+0.52
9	9	Max Franz	Austria	2:07.03	+0.80
10	21	Erik Guay	Canada	2:07.04	+0.81
11	17	Dominik Paris	Italy	2:07.13	+0.90
12	10	Werner Heel	Italy	2:07.16	+0.93
13	13	Beat Feuz	Switzerland	2:07.49	+1.26
14	27	Didier Défago	Switzerland	2:07.79	+1.56
15	16	Patrick Küng	Switzerland	2:07.82	+1.59
16	26	David Poisson	France	2:07.83	+1.60
17	23	Georg Streitberger	Austria	2:07.86	+1.63
18	19	Adrien Théaux	France	2:07.89	+1.66
19	6	Benjamin Thomsen	Canada	2:08.00	+1.77
20	29	Ondřej Bank	Czech Republic	2:08.24	+2.01
21	2	Jan Hudec	Canada	2:08.49	+2.26
22	22	Klaus Kröll	Austria	2:08.50	+2.27
23	5	Aleksandr Glebov	Russia	2:08.96	+2.73
24	33	Klemen Kosi	Slovenia	2:08.98	+2.75
25	28	Manuel Osborne-Paradis	Canada	2:09.00	+2.77
26	30	Guillermo Fayed	France	2:09.03	+2.80
27	1	Steven Nyman	United States	2:09.15	+2.92
28	31	Paul de la Cuesta	Spain	2:09.46	+3.23
29	24	Natko Zrnčić-Dim	Croatia	2:09.80	+3.57
30	25	Marco Sullivan	United States	2:10.10	+3.87
31	36	Yuri Danilochkin	Belarus	2:10.58	+4.35
32	34	Kevin Esteve Rigail	Andorra	2:10.80	+4.57
33	35	Igor Zakurdayev	Kazakhstan	2:11.28	+5.05
34	4	Ferran Terra	Spain	2:11.43	+5.20
35	46	Martin Vráblík	Czech Republic	2:11.73	+5.50
36	49	Georgi Georgiev	Bulgaria	2:12.49	+6.26
37	41	Christoffer Faarup	Denmark	2:12.55	+6.32
38	45	Nikola Chongarov	Bulgaria	2:12.57	+6.34
39	39	Arnaud Alessandria	Monaco	2:12.71	+6.48
40	37	Marc Oliveras	Andorra	2:12.76	+6.53
41	42	Henrik von Appen	Chile	2:13.16	+6.93
42	48	Martin Khuber	Kazakhstan	2:13.51	+7.28
43	40	Dmitriy Koshkin	Kazakhstan	2:14.63	+8.40
44	47	Igor Laikert	Bosnia and Herzegovina	2:15.07	+8.84
45	43	Martin Bendík	Slovakia	2:15.39	+9.16
46	50	Ioan Valeriu Achiriloaie	Romania	2:17.46	+11.23
47	38	Roberts Rode	Latvia	2:17.50	+11.27
	44	Cristian Javier Simari Birkner	Argentina	DNS	
	12	Johan Clarey	France	DNF	
	32	Aleksander Aamodt Kilde	Norway	DNF	
