= Paul de la Cuesta =

Spanish alpine skier (born 1988)

Paul de la Cuesta Esnal (born 28 November 1988) is an alpine skier from Spain. He competed for Spain at the 2010 Winter Olympics.

== Olympic results ==
Season	Date	Location	Discipline	Place
2010	15 Feb 2010	Vancouver, Canada	Downhill	51st
2010	19 Feb 2010	Vancouver, Canada	Super-G	35th
2010	23 Feb 2010	Vancouver, Canada	Giant Slalom	32nd
2014	9 Feb 2014	Sochi, Russia	Downhill	28th
2014	14 Feb 2014	Sochi, Russia	Super Combined	22nd
2014	16 Feb 2014	Sochi, Russia	Super-G	DNF
2014	19 Feb 2014	Sochi, Russia	Giant Slalom	36th
