= Tyler Nella =

Canadian alpine skier (born 1988)

Personal information
- Born: 8 March 1988 (age 38) Burlington, Ontario, Canada
- Height: 183 cm (6 ft 0 in)
- Weight: 87 kg (192 lb)

Sport
- Sport: Skiing
- Updated on 26 May 2016

Tyler Nella (born 8 March 1988) is a Canadian alpine skier.

He competed at the 2010 Winter Olympics in Vancouver in the men's super combined competition.
