= Czech Republic at the 2010 Winter Olympics =

- IOC code: CZE
- NOC: Czech Olympic Committee
- Website: www.olympic.cz (in Czech and English)

in Vancouver, Canada 12-26 February
- Competitors: 92 (70 men, 22 women) in 13 sports
- Flag bearers: Jaromír Jágr (opening); Martina Sáblíková (closing)
- Medals Ranked 14th: Gold 2 Silver 0 Bronze 4 Total 6

Winter Olympics appearances (overview)
- 1994; 1998; 2002; 2006; 2010; 2014; 2018; 2022; 2026

Other related appearances
- Czechoslovakia (1924–1992)

The Czech Republic participated in the 2010 Winter Olympics in Vancouver, British Columbia, Canada, sending 92 participants, the largest Czech team ever to appear at the Winter Olympics. The Czechs competed in the majority of events, except curling, skeleton and women's ice hockey. Hockey player Jaromír Jágr served as flag bearer at the opening ceremony.

The medal hopes were set on speed skater Martina Sáblíková, cross-country skier Lukáš Bauer, freestyle skier Tomáš Kraus and alpine skier Šárka Záhrobská. As for ice hockey team, the expectations were less ambitious than at previous Olympics and this became true when the Czech teams went out in the quarterfinals. The games of Vancouver were with six medals the most successful in history of independent Czech Republic, equalling the medal count of its predecessor Czechoslovakia from Sarajevo 1984 but surpassing it in quality. The most successful Czech participant (and also the flag bearer during the closing ceremony) was speed skater Martina Sáblíková with two gold and one bronze medal.

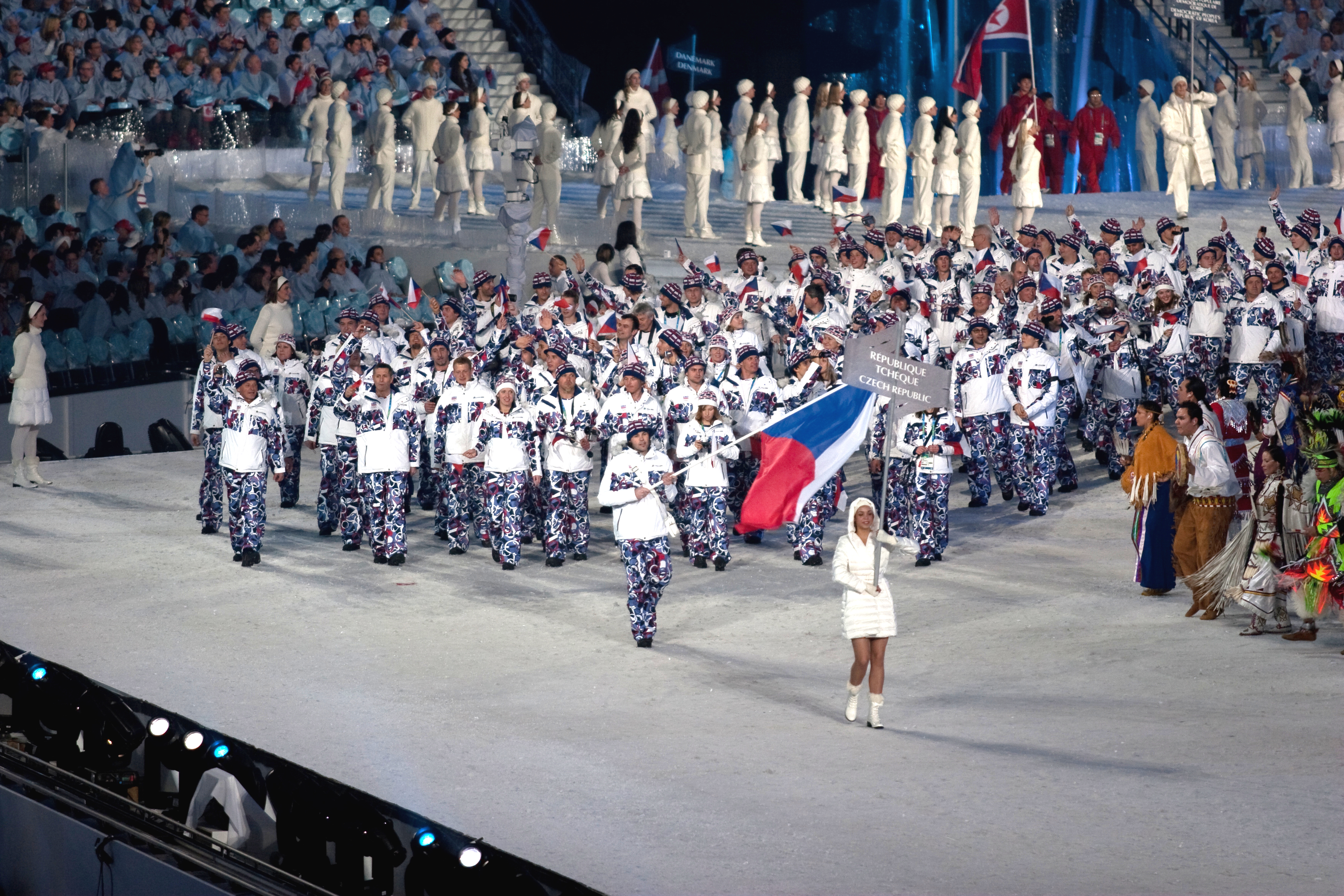
The athletes entering the stadium during the opening ceremonies

== Medalists ==
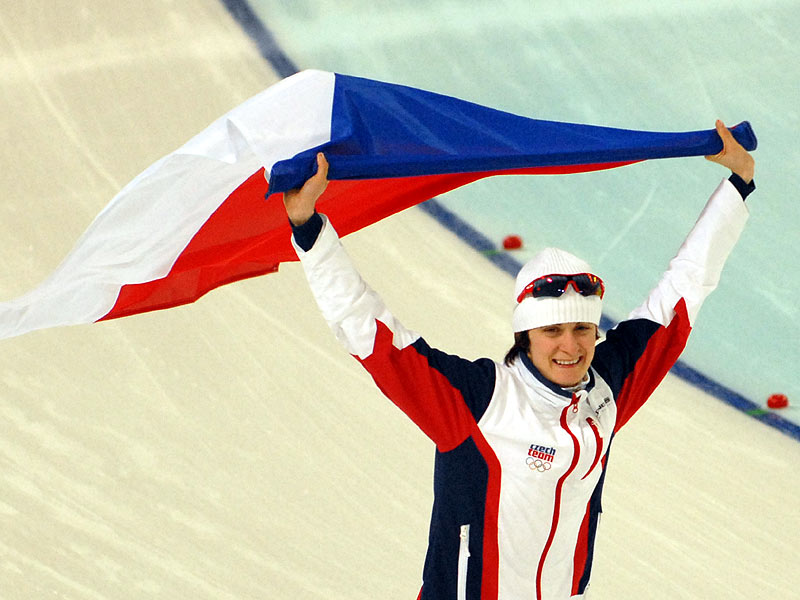
Martina Sáblíková

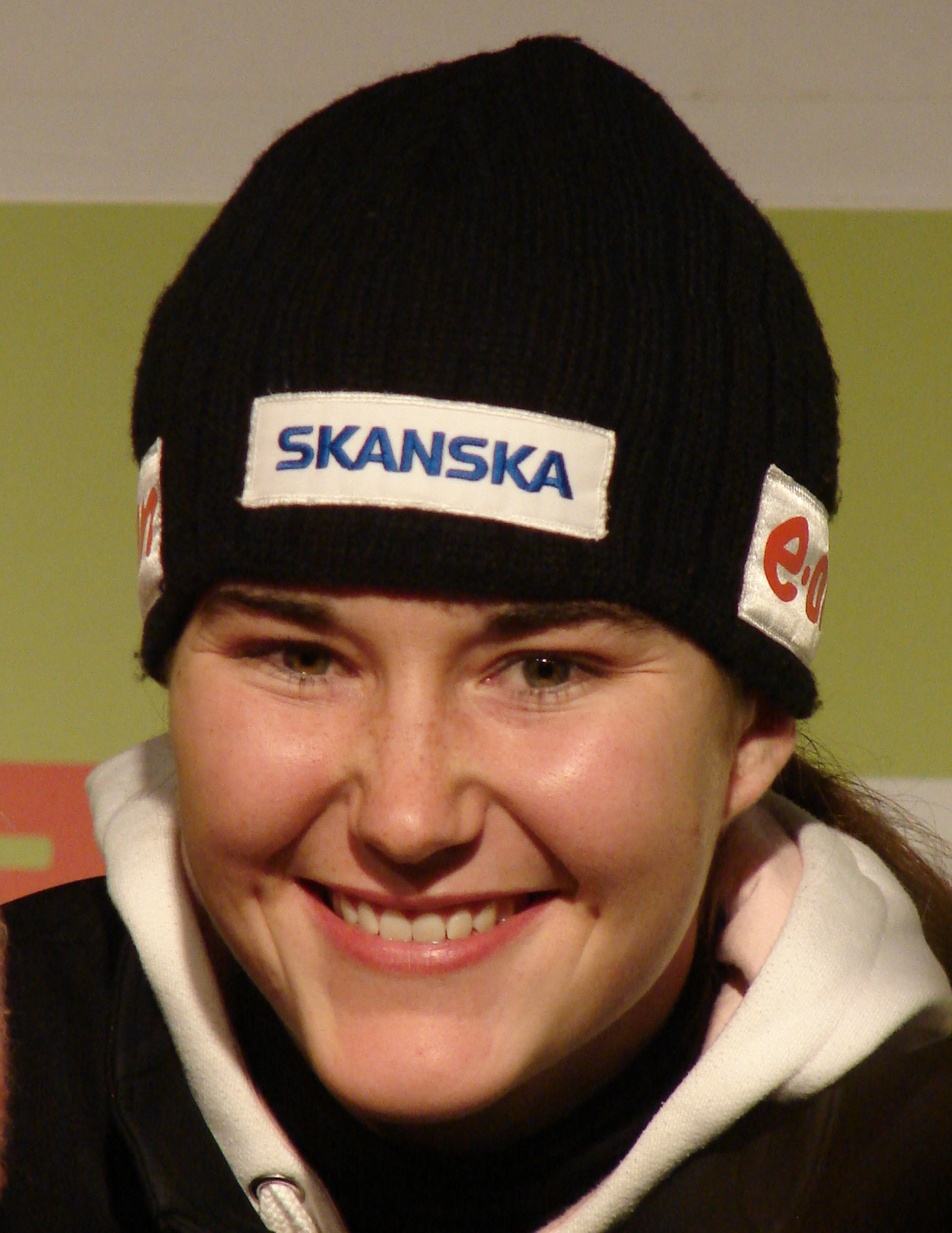
Šárka Záhrobská

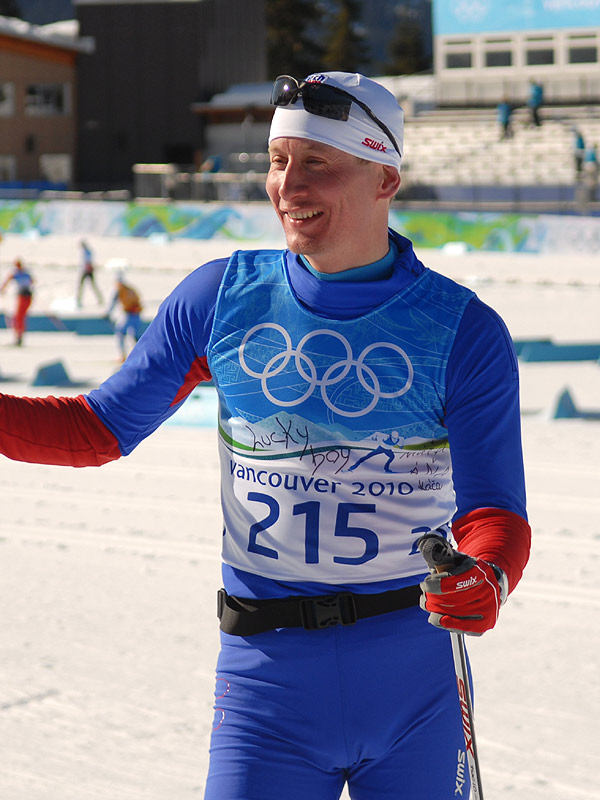
Lukáš Bauer

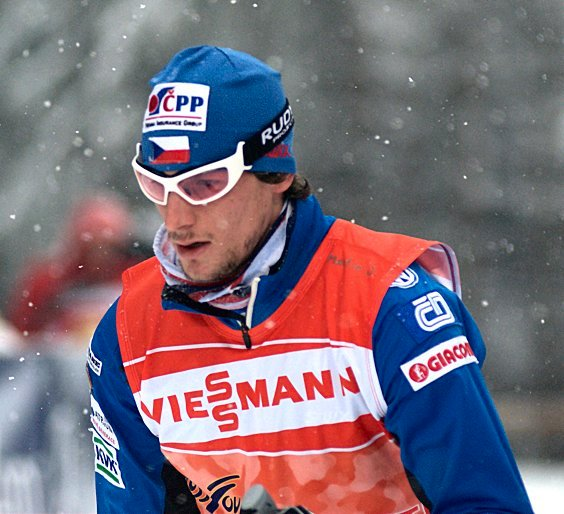
Martin Jakš

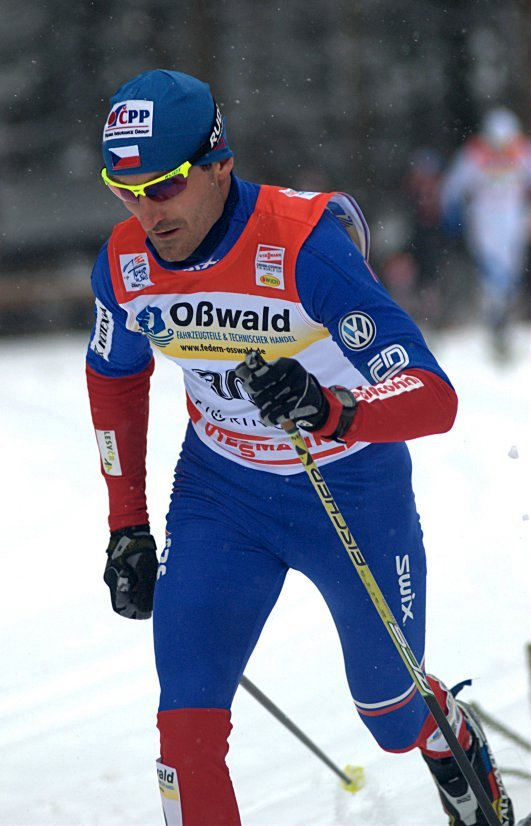
Jiří Magál

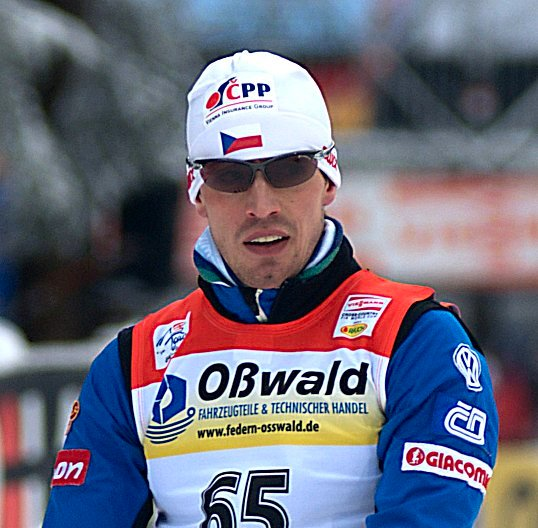
Martin Koukal

| Medal | Name | Sport | Event |
|---|---|---|---|
| Gold | Martina Sáblíková | Speed skating | Women's 3000 metres |
| Gold | Martina Sáblíková | Speed skating | Women's 5000 metres |
| Bronze | Lukáš Bauer | Cross-country skiing | Men's 15 km freestyle |
| Bronze | Martina Sáblíková | Speed skating | Women's 1500 metres |
| Bronze | Martin Jakš; Lukáš Bauer; Jiří Magál; Martin Koukal | Cross-country skiing | Men's 4 x 10 km relay |
| Bronze | Šárka Záhrobská | Alpine skiing | Women's slalom |

== Alpine skiing ==
| Athlete | Event | Final | | | |
| Athlete | Event | Run 1 | Run 2 | Total | Rank |
|---|---|---|---|---|---|
| Ondřej Bank | Men's downhill | n/a | | 1:56.66 | 30 |
| Ondřej Bank | Men's giant slalom | 1:18.39 | 1:21.25 | 2:39.64 | 17 |
| Ondřej Bank | Men's slalom | 48.69 | 52.12 | 1:40.81 | 11 |
| Ondřej Bank | Men's combined | 1:55.17 | 51.02 | 2:46.19 | 7 |
| Klára Křížová | Women's downhill | n/a | | 2:09.27 | 37 |
| Klára Křížová | Women's super-G | n/a | | 1:26.46 | 29 |
| Kryštof Krýzl | Men's downhill | n/a | | 1:58.43 | 40 |
| Kryštof Krýzl | Men's giant slalom | 1:18.57 | 1:22.16 | 2:40.73 | 23 |
| Kryštof Krýzl | Men's slalom | Disqualified | | | |
| Kryštof Krýzl | Men's combined | 1:56.06 | 52.25 | 2:48.31 | 17 |
| Filip Trejbal | Men's downhill | n/a | | 2:02.57 | 57 |
| Filip Trejbal | Men's giant slalom | 1:21.74 | 1:23.67 | 2:45.41 | 39 |
| Filip Trejbal | Men's slalom | did not finish | | | |
| Filip Trejbal | Men's combined | 1:58.62 | 52.23 | 2:50.85 | 28 |
| Martin Vráblík | Men's super-G | n/a | | Disqualified | |
| Martin Vráblík | Men's giant slalom | Did not finish | | | |
| Martin Vráblík | Men's slalom | Did not finish | | | |
| Martin Vráblík | Men's combined | 1:58.54 | 53.92 | 2:52.46 | 31 |
| Šárka Záhrobská | Women's downhill | n/a | | 1:50.68 | 27 |
| Šárka Záhrobská | Women's giant slalom | 1:18.06 | did not finish | | |
| Šárka Záhrobská | Women's slalom | 51.15 | 52.75 | 1:43.90 | 3rd place, bronze medalist(s) |
| Šárka Záhrobská | Women's combined | 1:27.33 | 43.69 | 2:11.02 | 7 |
| Petr Záhrobský | Men's downhill | n/a | | 1:57.44 | 36 |
| Petra Zakouřilová | Women's giant slalom | did not finish | | | |
| Petra Zakouřilová | Women's slalom | did not finish | | | |

== Biathlon ==
Men

| Athlete | Event | Final | | |
| Athlete | Event | Time | Misses | Rank |
|---|---|---|---|---|
| Roman Dostál | Individual | 52:51.4 | 3 | 35 |
| Ondřej Moravec | Sprint | 27:39.8 | 3 | 67 |
| Michal Šlesingr | Sprint | 25:50.9 | 1 | 18 |
| Michal Šlesingr | Pursuit | 35:58.8 | 3 | 29 |
| Michal Šlesingr | Mass start | 36:35.6 | 2 | 16 |
| Michal Šlesingr | Individual | 51:04.8 | 2 | 17 |
| Jaroslav Soukup | Sprint | 27:10.4 | 2 | 52 |
| Jaroslav Soukup | Pursuit | 38:04.9 | 4 | 51 |
| Jaroslav Soukup | Individual | 52:35.2 | 3 | 30 |
| Zdeněk Vítek | Sprint | 26:13.7 | 1 | 28 |
| Zdeněk Vítek | Pursuit | 36:45.1 | 5 | 38 |
| Zdeněk Vítek | Individual | 55:41.2 | 6 | 67 |
| Czech Republic; Jaroslav Soukup; Zdeněk Vítek; Roman Dostál; Michal Šlesingr | Relay | 1:23:55.2; 20:13.5; 20:36.8; 21:45.7; 21:19.2 | 0+9; 0+1; 0+2; 0+4; 0+2 | 6 |

Women

| Athlete | Event | Final | | |
| Athlete | Event | Time | Misses | Rank |
|---|---|---|---|---|
| Magda Rezlerová | Sprint | 20:51.0 | 0 | 19 |
| Magda Rezlerová | Pursuit | 33:46.9 | 5 | 32 |
| Magda Rezlerová | Individual | 47:13.1 | 5 | 64 |
| Zdeňka Vejnarová | Sprint | 22:28.5 | 2 | 60 |
| Zdeňka Vejnarová | Pursuit | 37:30.6 | 6 | 55 |
| Zdeňka Vejnarová | Individual | 46:38.0 | 4 | 55 |
| Veronika Vítková | Sprint | 21:10.9 | 0 | 24 |
| Veronika Vítková | Pursuit | 34:02.5 | 3 | 37 |
| Veronika Vítková | Individual | 47:33.4 | 4 | 68 |
| Veronika Zvařičová | Sprint | 22:52.9 | 2 | 71 |
| Gabriela Soukalová | Individual | 46:49.8 | 2 | 60 |
| Czech Republic; Veronika Vítková; Magda Rezlerová; Gabriela Soukalová; Zdeňka Vejnarová | Relay | 1:14:37.5; 17:51.1; 18:25.9; 18:23.7; 19:56.8 | 3+10; 0+2; 1+3; 0+1; 2+4 | 16 |

== Bobsleigh ==
| Athlete | Event | Final | | | | | |
| Athlete | Event | Run 1 | Run 2 | Run 3 | Run 4 | Total | Rank |
|---|---|---|---|---|---|---|---|
| Ivo Danilevič; Jan Stokláska | Two-man | 52.73 | 52.59 | 52.52 | 52.44 | 3:30.28 | 16 |
| Ivo Danilevič; Jan Kobián; Dominik Suchý; Jan Stokláska | Four-man | 51.54 | 51.72 | 51.76 | 51.96 | 3:26.98 | 12 |
| Jan Vrba; Miloš Veselý; Martin Bohman; Ondřej Kozlovský | Four-man | 52.00 | 52.09 | 52.43 | 52.61 | 3:29.13 | 16 |

== Cross-country skiing ==
Distance
Men

| Athlete | Event | Final | |
| Athlete | Event | Time | Rank |
|---|---|---|---|
| Lukáš Bauer | 15 km freestyle | 34:12.0 | 3rd place, bronze medalist(s) |
| Lukáš Bauer | 30 km pursuit | 1:15:25.2 | 7 |
| Lukáš Bauer | 50 km classical | 2:05:49.4 | 12 |
| Martin Jakš | 15 km freestyle | 35:13.0 | 29 |
| Martin Jakš | 30 km pursuit | 1:17:58.2 | 27 |
| Martin Koukal | 15 km freestyle | 34:53.5 | 18 |
| Martin Koukal | 30 km pursuit | 1:14:25.9 | 20 |
| Milan Šperl | 15 km freestyle | 35:46.4 | 43 |
| Jiří Magál | 50 km classical | 2:10:22.7 | 29 |
| Czech Republic; Martin Jakš; Lukáš Bauer; Jiří Magál; Martin Koukal | 4 x 10 km relay | 1:45:21.9; 28:22.4; 27:36.4; 24:34.8; 24:48.3 | 3rd place, bronze medalist(s) |

Women

| Athlete | Event | Final | |
| Athlete | Event | Time | Rank |
|---|---|---|---|
| Ivana Janečková | 10 km freestyle | 26:51.3 | 32 |
| Ivana Janečková | 30 km classical | 1:40:13.6 | 40 |
| Eva Nývltová | 10 km freestyle | 28:04.1 | 54 |
| Eva Nývltová | 15 km pursuit | 44:52.8 | 50 |
| Eva Nývltová | 30 km classical | 1:38:40.1 | 39 |
| Kamila Rajdlová | 10 km freestyle | 26:26.2 | 25 |
| Kamila Rajdlová | 15 km pursuit | 42:26.5 | 23 |
| Eva Skalníková | 30 km classical | 1:44:47.8 | 47 |
| Czech Republic; Eva Nývltová; Kamila Rajdlová; Ivana Janečková; Eva Skalníková | 4 x 5 km relay | 59:11.2; 15:15.0; 15:28.9; 13:34.3; 14:53.0 | 13 |

Sprint

| Athlete | Event | Qualifying | | Quarterfinal | | Semifinal | | Final | |
| Athlete | Event | Total | Rank | Total | Rank | Total | Rank | Total | Rank |
|---|---|---|---|---|---|---|---|---|---|
| Dušan Kožíšek | Men's sprint | 3:42.45 | 35 | did not advance | | | | | |
| Eva Nývltová | Women's sprint | 3:51.37 | 33 | did not advance | | | | | |
| Aleš Razým | Men's sprint | 3:46.42 | 44 | did not advance | | | | | |
| Dušan Kožíšek; Martin Koukal | Men's team sprint | n/a | | | | 3:10.4 | 1 Q | 3:19.6 | 6 |

== Figure skating ==
The Czech Republic qualified two entrants in men's singles and one in ice dancing, for a total of four athletes.

| Athlete(s) | Event | CD | | SP/OD | | FS/FD | | Total | |
| Athlete(s) | Event | Points | Rank | Points | Rank | Points | Rank | Points | Rank |
|---|---|---|---|---|---|---|---|---|---|
| Michal Březina | Men's | | | 78.80 | 9 | 137.93 | 11 | 216.73 | 10 |
| Tomáš Verner | Men's | | | 65.32 | 19 | 119.42 | 17 | 184.74 | 19 |
| Kamila Hájková, David Vincour | Ice dancing | 23.19 | 22 | 40.54 | 22 | 70.08 | 21 | 133.81 | 21 |

== Freestyle skiing ==
| Athlete | Event | Qualifying | | Final | |
| Athlete | Event | Points | Rank | Points | Rank |
|---|---|---|---|---|---|
| Martina Konopová | Women's aerials | 115.07 | 21 | did not advance | |
| Nikola Sudová | Women's moguls | 22.40 | 12 Q | 19.41 | 16 |
| Šárka Sudová | Women's moguls | 18.55 | 25 | did not advance | |
| Tereza Vaculíková | Women's moguls | 1.50 | 27 | did not advance | |
| Lukáš Vaculík | Men's moguls | 21.78 | 26 | did not advance | |

Ski cross

| Athlete | Event | Qualifying | | 1/8 finals | Quarterfinals | Semifinals | Finals | |
| Athlete | Event | Time | Rank | Position | Position | Position | Position | Rank |
|---|---|---|---|---|---|---|---|---|
| Tomáš Kraus | Men's ski cross | 1:13.75 | 11 Q | 1 Q | 3 | did not advance | | |
| Zdeněk Šafář | Men's ski cross | did not finish | | | | | | |

== Ice hockey ==
=== Men's tournament ===
Roster

The following is the Czech roster in the men's ice hockey tournament of the 2010 Winter Olympics.

| No. | Pos. | Name | Height | Weight | Birthdate | Birthplace | 2009–10 team |
|---|---|---|---|---|---|---|---|
| 31 | G | Ondřej Pavelec | 188 cm (6 ft 2 in) | 91 kg (201 lb) | 31 August 1987 | Kladno | (United States) Atlanta Thrashers (NHL) |
| 33 | G | Jakub Štěpánek | 187 cm (6 ft 2 in) | 71 kg (157 lb) | 20 June 1986 | Vsetín | (Czech Republic) Vítkovice (CZE) |
| 29 | G | Tomáš Vokoun | 183 cm (6 ft 0 in) | 88 kg (194 lb) | 2 July 1976 | Karlovy Vary | (United States) Florida Panthers (NHL) |
| 44 | D | Miroslav Blaťák | 183 cm (6 ft 0 in) | 79 kg (174 lb) | 25 May 1982 | Zlín | (Russia) Salavat Yulaev Ufa (KHL) |
| 35 | D | Jan Hejda | 191 cm (6 ft 3 in) | 95 kg (209 lb) | 18 June 1978 | Prague | (United States) Columbus Blue Jackets (NHL) |
| 15 | D | Tomáš Kaberle – A | 185 cm (6 ft 1 in) | 90 kg (200 lb) | 2 March 1978 | Rakovník | (Canada) Toronto Maple Leafs (NHL) |
| 17 | D | Filip Kuba | 196 cm (6 ft 5 in) | 103 kg (227 lb) | 29 December 1976 | Ostrava | (Canada) Ottawa Senators (NHL) |
| 77 | D | Pavel Kubina | 193 cm (6 ft 4 in) | 111 kg (245 lb) | 15 April 1977 | Čeladná | (United States) Atlanta Thrashers (NHL) |
| 4 | D | Zbyněk Michálek | 185 cm (6 ft 1 in) | 91 kg (201 lb) | 23 December 1982 | Jindřichův Hradec | (United States) Phoenix Coyotes (NHL) |
| 5 | D | Roman Polák | 185 cm (6 ft 1 in) | 103 kg (227 lb) | 28 April 1986 | Ostrava | (United States) St. Louis Blues (NHL) |
| 3 | D | Marek Židlický | 180 cm (5 ft 11 in) | 86 kg (190 lb) | 3 February 1977 | Most | (United States) Minnesota Wild (NHL) |
| 16 | RW | Petr Čajánek | 180 cm (5 ft 11 in) | 80 kg (180 lb) | 18 August 1975 | Zlín | (Russia) SKA Saint Petersburg (KHL) |
| 10 | C | Roman Červenka | 181 cm (5 ft 11 in) | 85 kg (187 lb) | 10 December 1985 | Prague | (Czech Republic) Slavia Prague (CZE) |
| 26 | LW | Patrik Eliáš – C | 181 cm (5 ft 11 in) | 88 kg (194 lb) | 13 April 1976 | Třebíč | (United States) New Jersey Devils (NHL) |
| 91 | RW | Martin Erat | 183 cm (6 ft 0 in) | 91 kg (201 lb) | 12 August 1982 | Třebíč | (United States) Nashville Predators (NHL) |
| 34 | LW | Tomáš Fleischmann | 185 cm (6 ft 1 in) | 87 kg (192 lb) | 16 May 1984 | Kopřivnice | (United States) Washington Capitals (NHL) |
| 24 | RW | Martin Havlát | 188 cm (6 ft 2 in) | 98 kg (216 lb) | 19 April 1981 | Mladá Boleslav | (United States) Minnesota Wild (NHL) |
| 68 | RW | Jaromír Jágr – A | 191 cm (6 ft 3 in) | 110 kg (240 lb) | 15 February 1972 | Kladno | (Russia) Avangard Omsk (KHL) |
| 46 | C | David Krejčí | 183 cm (6 ft 0 in) | 80 kg (180 lb) | 28 April 1986 | Šternberk | (United States) Boston Bruins (NHL) |
| 9 | LW | Milan Michálek | 188 cm (6 ft 2 in) | 102 kg (225 lb) | 7 December 1984 | Jindřichův Hradec | (Canada) Ottawa Senators (NHL) |
| 14 | C | Tomáš Plekanec | 180 cm (5 ft 11 in) | 90 kg (200 lb) | 31 October 1982 | Kladno | (Canada) Montreal Canadiens (NHL) |
| 60 | F | Tomáš Rolinek | 175 cm (5 ft 9 in) | 78 kg (172 lb) | 17 February 1980 | Žďár nad Sázavou | (Russia) Metallurg Magnitogorsk (KHL) |
| 63 | C | Josef Vašíček | 193 cm (6 ft 4 in) | 104 kg (229 lb) | 12 September 1980 | Havlíčkův Brod | (Russia) Lokomotiv Yaroslavl (KHL) |

==== Group play ====
The Czech Republic will play in Group B.

Round-robin

All times are local (UTC-8).

| 17 February 2010; 21:00 | Czech Republic | 3–1 (1–0, 2–1, 0–0) | Slovakia | Canada Hockey Place, Vancouver; Attendance: 16,924 |

Game reference

Tomáš Vokoun
Goalies
Jaroslav Halák
Referees:
(Switzerland) Brent Reiber
(Canada) Brad Watson
Linesmen:
(United States) Shane Heyer
(Canada) Sylvain Losier

| P. Eliáš (M. Havlát, M. Blaťák) – 9:02 | 1–0 |
| | 1–1 | 20:47 – M. Gáborík (Mari. Hossa, P. Demitra) |
| J. Jágr (R. Červenka) – 37:56 | 2–1 |
| T. Plekanec (J. Jágr, M. Židlický) – 39:58 | 3–1 |

8 min
Penalties
12 min
24
Shots
35

| 19 February 2010; 16:30 | Czech Republic | 5–2 (3–0, 1–2, 1–0) | Latvia | Canada Hockey Place, Vancouver; Attendance: 16,984 |

Game reference

Tomáš Vokoun
Goalies
Edgars Masaļskis
Referees:
(Finland) Jyri Rönn
(United States) Chris Rooney
Linesmen:
(Finland) Stefan Fonselius
(United States) Thor Nelson

| D. Krejčí (M. Erat, T. Fleischmann) – 2:30 | 1–0 |
| M. Michálek (M. Židlický, T. Plekanec) – 3:33 | 2–0 |
| J. Jágr (M. Židlický, T. Kaberle) (PP) – 5:07 | 3–0 |
| T. Kaberle (P. Eliáš, M. Židlický) (PP) – 26:33 | 4–0 |
| | 4–1 | 35:30 – K. Sotnieks (H. Vasiļjevs) |
| | 4–2 | 38:26 – Ģ. Ankipāns (M. Karsums, G. Pujacs) (PP) |
| P. Eliáš (SH) (EN) – 59:42 | 5–2 |

10 min
Penalties
26 min
39
Shots
18

| 21 February 2010; 12:00 | Russia | 4–2 (1–1, 1–0, 2–1) | Czech Republic | Canada Hockey Place, Vancouver; Attendance: 17,114 |

Game reference

Evgeni Nabokov
Goalies
Tomáš Vokoun
Referees:
(Canada) Dan O'Halloran
(Canada) Guy Pellerin
Linesmen:
(United States) Peter Feola
(Canada) Jean Morin

| E. Malkin (P. Datsyuk, A. Ovechkin) (PP) – 15:13 | 1–0 |
| | 1–1 | 19:06 – T. Plekanec (P. Eliáš, T. Kaberle) (PP2) |
| V. Kozlov (A. Radulov, S. Fedorov) – 34:34 | 2–1 |
| E. Malkin (A. Semin, F. Tyutin) – 41:49 | 3–1 |
| | 3–2 | 54:51 – M. Michálek (M. Židlický, M. Blaťák) |
| P. Datsyuk (E. Malkin, A. Ovechkin) (EN) – 59:47 | 4–2 |

12 min
Penalties
6 min
31
Shots
25

Standings

| Team | Pld | W | OTW | OTL | L | GF | GA | GD | Pts | Qualification |
|---|---|---|---|---|---|---|---|---|---|---|
| Russia | 3 | 2 | 0 | 1 | 0 | 13 | 6 | +7 | 7 | Quarterfinals |
| Czech Republic | 3 | 2 | 0 | 0 | 1 | 10 | 7 | +3 | 6 | |
| Slovakia | 3 | 1 | 1 | 0 | 1 | 9 | 4 | +5 | 5 | |
| Latvia | 3 | 0 | 0 | 0 | 3 | 4 | 19 | −15 | 0 | |

Source: IIHF

==== Final rounds ====
Qualification playoff

| 23 February 2010; 19:00 | Czech Republic | 3–2 (OT) (2–0, 0–0, 0–2, 1–0) | Latvia | UBC Thunderbird Arena, Vancouver; Attendance: 5,448 |

Game reference

Tomáš Vokoun
Goalies
Edgars Masaļskis
Referees:
(Canada) Bill McCreary
(Switzerland) Brent Reiber
Linesmen:
(Slovakia) Milan Novak
(Germany) Felix Winnekens

| T. Rolinek (F. Kuba, M. Havlát) (PP) – 5:52 | 1–0 |
| T. Fleischmann (D. Krejčí, R. Červenka) – 11:06 | 2–0 |
| | 2–1 | 52:02 – M. Cipulis (A. Ņiživijs, K. Rēdlihs) |
| | 2–2 | 56:19 – M. Rēdlihs (A. Bērziņš, L. Dārziņš) |
| D. Krejčí (T. Fleischmann) – 65:10 | 3–2 |

10 min
Penalties
10 min
50
Shots
26

Quarterfinal

| 24 February 2010; 19:00 | Finland | 2–0 (0–0, 0–0, 2–0) | Czech Republic | UBC Thunderbird Arena, Vancouver; Attendance: 5,461 |

Game reference
| Miikka Kiprusoff | Goalies | Tomáš Vokoun | Referees: (Canada) Dan O'Halloran (Canada) Brad Watson; Linesmen: (Russia) Yuri Oskirko (Canada) Jay Sharrers |
| N. Hagman (J. Niskala) (PP) – 53:34 / 1–0; V. Filppula (M. Koivu) (EN) – 58:25 / 2–0 | | | Referees: (Canada) Dan O'Halloran (Canada) Brad Watson; Linesmen: (Russia) Yuri Oskirko (Canada) Jay Sharrers |
| 4 min | Penalties | 12 min | Referees: (Canada) Dan O'Halloran (Canada) Brad Watson; Linesmen: (Russia) Yuri Oskirko (Canada) Jay Sharrers |
| 31 | Shots | 31 | Referees: (Canada) Dan O'Halloran (Canada) Brad Watson; Linesmen: (Russia) Yuri Oskirko (Canada) Jay Sharrers |

== Luge ==
| Athlete | Event | Final | | | | | |
| Athlete | Event | Run 1 | Run 2 | Run 3 | Run 4 | Total | Rank |
|---|---|---|---|---|---|---|---|
| Jakub Hyman | Men's singles | 49.379 | 49.726 | 49.465 | 49.231 | 3:17.801 | 28 |
| Ondřej Hyman | Men's singles | 49.284 | 49.346 | 49.512 | 49.247 | 3:17.389 | 25 |
| Luboš Jíra; Matěj Kvíčala | Doubles | 42.204 | 42.459 | n/a | | 1:24.663 | 18 |

== Nordic combined ==
| Athlete | Event | Ski Jumping | | Cross-Country | | |
| Athlete | Event | Points | Rank | Deficit | Time | Rank |
|---|---|---|---|---|---|---|
| Pavel Churavý | Individual normal hill/10 km | 121.5 | 10 | 0:56 | 25:32.7 | 12 |
| Pavel Churavý | Individual large hill/10 km | 114.0 | 8 | 0:34 | 25:14.9 | 5 |
| Miroslav Dvořák | Individual normal hill/10 km | 105.5 | 39 | 2:00 | 26:33.5 | 35 |
| Miroslav Dvořák | Individual large hill/10 km | 107.5 | 36 | 2:53 | 25:36.7 | 15 |
| Tomáš Slavík | Individual normal hill/10 km | 115.5 | 24 | 1:20 | 25:36.8 | 20 |
| Tomáš Slavík | Individual large hill/10 km | 104.7 | 18 | 1:29 | 26:29.8 | 25 |
| Aleš Vodseďálek | Individual normal hill/10 km | 108.5 | 35 | 1:48 | 27:45.8 | 44 |
| Aleš Vodseďálek | Individual large hill/10 km | 102.8 | 20 | 1:37 | 27:29.8 | 34 |
| Czech Republic; Aleš Vodseďálek; Miroslav Dvořák; Tomáš Slavík; Pavel Churavý | Team | 457.3; 109.0; 110.5; 113.3; 124.5 | 8 | 1:06 | 51:44.2; 12:51.1; 12:10.8; 13:08.1; 13:33.8 | 8 |

== Short track speed skating ==
| Athlete | Event | Heat | | Quarterfinal | | Semifinal | | Final | |
| Athlete | Event | Time | Rank | Time | Rank | Time | Rank | Time | Rank |
|---|---|---|---|---|---|---|---|---|---|
| Kateřina Novotná | 500 m | 44.614 | 2 Q | 44.438 | 3 | did not advance | | | 12 |
| Kateřina Novotná | 1000 m | 1:45.300 | 4 | did not advance | | | | | 28 |
| Kateřina Novotná | 1500 m | 2:24.504 | 3 Q | Disqualified | | | | | 19 |

== Ski jumping ==
| Athlete | Event | Qualifying | | First Round | | Final | | |
| Athlete | Event | Points | Rank | Points | Rank | Points | Total | Rank |
|---|---|---|---|---|---|---|---|---|
| Martin Cikl | Large hill | 114.3 | 29 Q | 78.4 | 41 | did not advance | | 41 |
| Antonín Hájek | Normal hill | 134.5 | 4 Q | 121.0 | 17 Q | 118.5 | 239.5 | 21 |
| Antonín Hájek | Large hill | 138.0 | 3 Q | 119.4 | 9 Q | 121.2 | 240.6 | 7 |
| Lukáš Hlava | Normal hill | 112.0 | 37 Q | 108.0 | 38 | did not advance | | 38 |
| Jakub Janda | Normal hill | 135.5 | 2 Q | 127.5 | 8 Q | 123.0 | 250.5 | 14 |
| Roman Koudelka | Normal hill | 123.5 | 18 Q | 127.0 | 9 Q | 125.0 | 252.0 | 12 |
| Roman Koudelka | Large hill | 117.0 | 27 Q | 97.0 | 29 Q | 111.5 | 208.5 | 23 |
| Czech Republic; Antonín Hájek; Roman Koudelka; Lukáš Hlava; Lukáš Hlava | Team | n/a | | 477.4; 121.2; 124.3; 112.5; 119.4 | 7 Q | 504.4; 134.0; 134.4; 114.3; 121.7 | 981.8 | 7 |

== Snowboarding ==
Halfpipe

| Athlete | Event | Qualifying | | | Semifinal | | | Final | | |
| Athlete | Event | Run 1 | Run 2 | Rank | Run 1 | Run 2 | Rank | Run 1 | Run 2 | Rank |
|---|---|---|---|---|---|---|---|---|---|---|
| Šárka Pančochová | Women's halfpipe | 15.4 | 28.1 | 17 QS | 34.4 | 24.9 | 8 | did not advance | | |

Parallel GS

| Athlete | Event | Qualification | | Round of 16 | Quarterfinals | Semifinals | Finals | |
| Athlete | Event | Time | Rank | Opposition Time | Opposition Time | Opposition Time | Opposition Time | Rank |
|---|---|---|---|---|---|---|---|---|
| Zuzana Doležalová | Women's parallel giant slalom | 1:26.55 | 22 | did not advance | | | | 22 |
| Petr Šindelář | Men's parallel giant slalom | 1:37.77 | 28 | did not advance | | | | 28 |

Snowboard cross

| Athlete | Event | Qualifying | | 1/8 finals | Quarterfinals | Semifinals | Finals | |
| Athlete | Event | Time | Rank | Position | Position | Position | Position | Rank |
|---|---|---|---|---|---|---|---|---|
| David Bakeš | Men's snowboard cross | 1:26.05 | 32 Q | 4 | did not advance | | | 32 |
| Michal Novotný | Men's snowboard cross | 1:24.23 | 29 Q | 2 Q | 4 | did not advance | | 16 |

== Speed skating ==
| Athlete | Event | Race 1 | | Race 2 | | Final | |
| Athlete | Event | Time | Rank | Time | Rank | Time | Rank |
|---|---|---|---|---|---|---|---|
| Karolína Erbanová | Women's 500 m | 39.365 | 25 | 39.321 | 26 | 78.686 | 23 |
| Karolína Erbanová | Women's 1000 m | n/a | | | | 1:17.53 | 12 |
| Karolína Erbanová | Women's 1500 m | n/a | | | | 2:02.01 | 25 |
| Martina Sáblíková | Women's 1500 m | n/a | | | | 1:57.96 | 3rd place, bronze medalist(s) |
| Martina Sáblíková | Women's 3000 m | n/a | | | | 4:02.53 | 1st place, gold medalist(s) |
| Martina Sáblíková | Women's 5000 m | n/a | | | | 6:50.91 | 1st place, gold medalist(s) |

== See also ==
- Czech Republic at the Olympics
- Czech Republic at the 2010 Winter Paralympics
