= Xia Lina =

Chinese alpine skier (born 1987)

Xia Lina (Chinese: 夏丽娜; born October 26, 1987, in Harbin) is a Chinese female alpine ski racer.

She competed for China at the 2010 Winter Olympics in the Slalom and Giant Slalom events. She then competed in the 2014 Winter Olympics in Sochi where she finished 66th in the Giant Slalom.
