= Claire Dautherives =

French alpine skier

Claire Dautherives (born 5 September 1982 in Saint-Jean-de-Maurienne) is an alpine skier from France. She competed for France at the 2010 Winter Olympics. She failed to finish in the slalom, her only event at the games. She has one top-ten place on the World Cup, an eighth-place finish in the slalom at Lienz, Austria in 2007.
