= Anna Berecz =

Hungarian alpine skier (born 1988)

Personal information
- Nationality: Hungarian
- Born: 4 September 1988 (age 37) Budapest, Hungarian People's Republic
- Height: 174 cm (5 ft 9 in)
- Weight: 68 kg (150 lb)

Sport
- Country: Hungary
- Sport: Alpine skiing
- Event(s): Downhill, super-G, giant slalom, slalom, combined

Achievements and titles
- Olympic finals: 2010 Winter Olympics: Downhill–35; Super combined–27 Super-G–DNF; Slalom–45; Giant slalom–42 2014 Winter Olympics: Downhill–35; Combined–34; Giant slalom–48 Slalom–44; Super-G–28

Anna Berecz (4 September 1988, in Budapest) is a female skier from Hungary. She took part in the alpine skiing events at the 2010 Winter Olympics and the 2014 Winter Olympics. She has also competed in the FIS Alpine World Ski Championships 2007 and the FIS Alpine World Ski Championships 2009.

In the 2010 Winter Olympics, Berecz competed in the women's downhill, coming 35, super combined, 27, super-G, where she failed to finish, slalom, 45, and giant slalom, 42.

== Results ==
FIS Alpine World Ski Championships 2007:
Slalom–53
Giant slalom–42
FIS Alpine World Ski Championships 2009:
Giant slalom–39
Super-G–34
2010 Winter Olympics:
Downhill–35
Super combined–27
Super-G–DNF
Slalom–45
Giant slalom–42
2014 Winter Olympics:
Downhill–35
Super combined–21
Super-G–28
Slalom–35
Giant slalom–48
