= Olivia Gallay Bertrand =

French alpine skier (born 1989)

Olivia Bertrand
Personal information
- Born: 2 January 1989 (age 37) Évian-les-Bains, France
- Height: 1.58 m (5 ft 2 in)
- Website: www.websitename.com

Sport
- Sport: Alpine skiing
- Club: Morzine/Avoriaz

Olivia Bertrand (born 2 January 1989 in Évian-les-Bains) is a French Alpine skier and non-commissioned officer.

She made her debut at the FIS Alpine Ski World Cup on 15 December 2006, and her best World Cup placing is two 12th places in the giant slalom from 2009.

Bertrand competed for France at the 2010 Winter Olympics and finished in 12th place in the Alpine skiing at the 2010 Winter Olympics – Women's giant slalom.
