= Spain at the 2010 Winter Olympics =

- IOC code: ESP
- NOC: Spanish Olympic Committee
- Website: www.coe.es (in Spanish)

in Vancouver
- Competitors: 18 in 7 sports
- Flag bearer: Queralt Castellet
- Medals: Gold 0 Silver 0 Bronze 0 Total 0

Winter Olympics appearances (overview)
- 1936; 1948; 1952; 1956; 1960; 1964; 1968; 1972; 1976; 1980; 1984; 1988; 1992; 1994; 1998; 2002; 2006; 2010; 2014; 2018; 2022; 2026; 2030

Spain participated at the 2010 Winter Olympics in Vancouver, British Columbia, Canada. The Spanish NOC nominated 18 athletes on 28 January 2010.

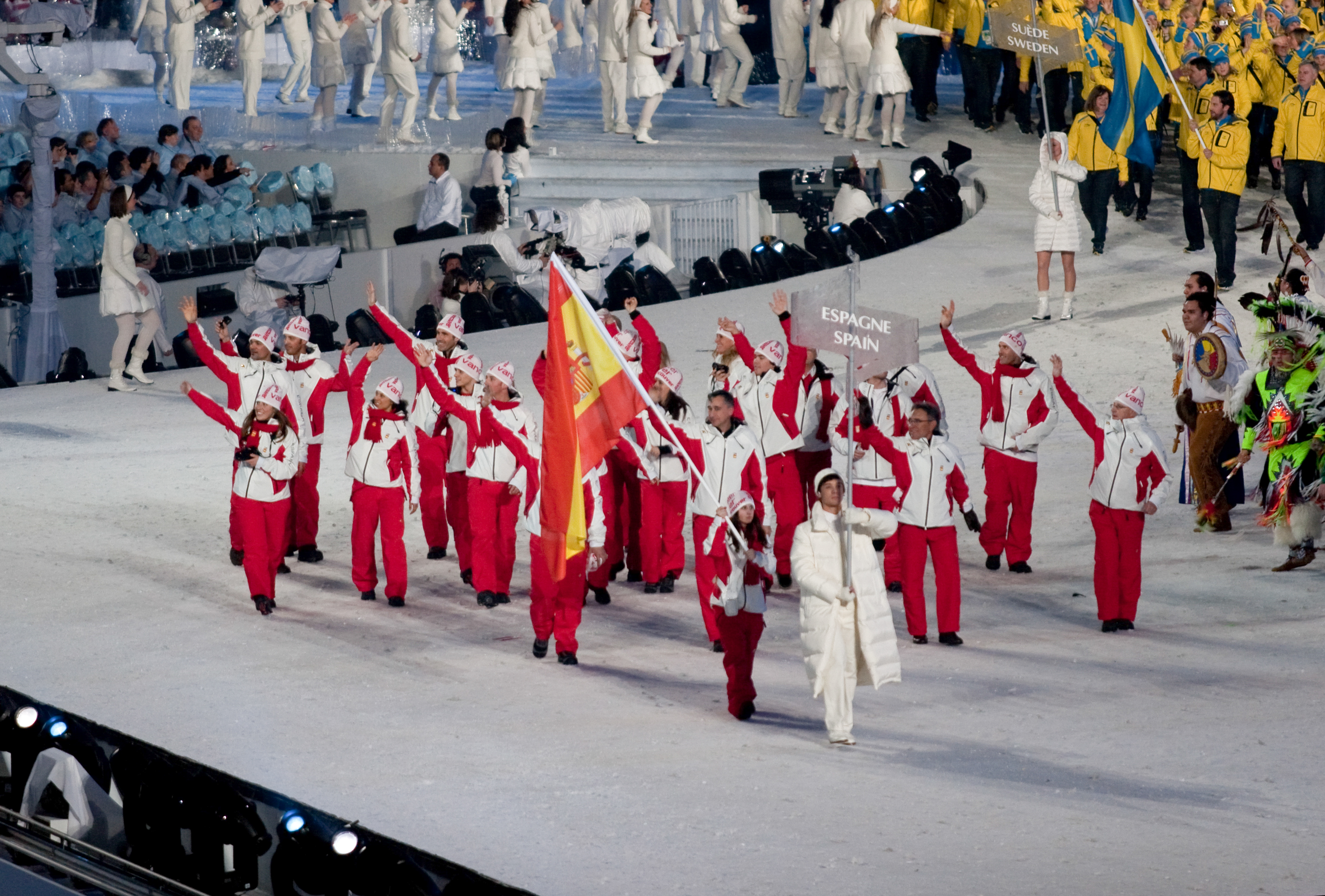
The athletes entering the stadium during the opening ceremonies.

== Alpine skiing ==
=== Men ===
Athlete	Event	Run 1	Run 2	Total	Rank
Paul de la Cuesta	Downhill			1:59.84	51
Paul de la Cuesta	Super-G			1:34.03	35
Paul de la Cuesta	Giant slalom	1:20.06	1:23.16	2:43.22	32
Ferrán Terra	Downhill			1:58.85	44
Ferrán Terra	Combined	1:56.12	DNF	DNF	n/a
Ferrán Terra	Super-G			1:32.75	27
Ferrán Terra	Giant slalom	DNF	—	DNF	n/a

=== Women ===
Athlete	Event	Run 1	Run 2	Total	Rank
Andrea Jardi	Super-G			DNF	n/a
Andrea Jardi	Giant slalom	1:20.41	DNF	DNF	n/a
Andrea Jardi	Slalom	DNF	—	DNF	n/a
María José Rienda	Giant slalom	1:21.22	1:16.23	2:37.45	38
Carolina Ruiz Castillo	Downhill			1:47.62	15
Carolina Ruiz Castillo	Super-G			1:23.05	18
Carolina Ruiz Castillo	Giant slalom	1:19.17	1:15.90	2:35.07	34

== Biathlon ==
=== Women ===
Athlete	Event	Time	Rank
Victoria Padial Hernández	7.5 km sprint	24:55.5	87
Victoria Padial Hernández	15 km individual	56:41.8	86

== Cross-country skiing ==
=== Men ===
Distance

Athlete	Event	Time	Rank
Javier Gutiérrez	15 km freestyle	37:55.7	69
Javier Gutiérrez	30 km pursuit	1:22:20.4	40
Javier Gutiérrez	50 km classical	DNF	n/a
Diego Ruiz Asin	15 km freestyle	37:31.8	65
Diego Ruiz Asin	50 km classical	2:17:49.8	44
Vicenç Vilarrubla	15 km freestyle	36:22.7	53
Vicenç Vilarrubla	30 km pursuit	1:19:48.2	31
Vicenç Vilarrubla	50 km classical	2:13:33.8	40

=== Women ===
Distance

Athlete	Event	Time	Rank
Laura Orgue	10 km freestyle	27:09.4	38
Laura Orgue	15 km pursuit	42:38.3	27
Laura Orgue	30 km classical	1:31:18.3	36

== Figure skating ==
Spain has qualified 1 entrant in men's singles and 1 in ladies singles, for a total of 2 athletes.

=== Men ===
Athlete	Event	SP		FS		Total	
Athlete	Event	Points	Rank	Points	Rank	Points	Rank
Javier Fernández	Men	68.69	16	137.99	10	206.68	14

=== Women ===
Athlete	Event	SP		FS		Total	
Athlete	Event	Points	Rank	Points	Rank	Points	Rank
Sonia Lafuente	Ladies	49.74	22	83.77	21	133.51	22

== Freestyle skiing ==
=== Women ===
Athlete	Event	Qualifying		1/8 finals	Quarterfinals	Semifinals	Finals	
Athlete	Event	Time	Rank	Position	Position	Position	Position	Rank
Rocío Delgado	Women's ski cross	1:22.67	31 Q	3	did not advance			

== Skeleton ==
=== Men ===
Athlete	Event	Run 1	Run 2	Run 3	Run 4	Total	Rank
Ander Mirambell	Men's	54.77	54.59	54.26	Did not advance	2:43.62	24

== Snowboard ==
=== Men ===
Halfpipe

Athlete	Qualification			Semifinals			Finals		
Athlete	Run 1	Run 2	Rank	Run 1	Run 2	Rank	Run 1	Run 2	Rank
Rubén Verges	9.4	19.5	15	did not advance					31

Snowboard cross

Athletes	Qualification		1/8 finals	Quarterfinals	Semifinals	Finals	
Athletes	Time	Rank	Position	Position	Position	Position	Rank
Jordi Font	DNF	n/a	did not advance				
Regino Hernández	1:25.90	31 Q	4	did not advance			

=== Women ===
Halfpipe

Athlete	Qualification			Semifinals			Finals		
Athlete	Run 1	Run 2	Rank	Run 1	Run 2	Rank	Run 1	Run 2	Rank
Queralt Castellet	44.3	19.9	3 Q	Qualified directly to final			DNS	DNS	12

== See also ==
- Spain at the 2010 Winter Paralympics
