= Lyaysan Rayanova =

Russian alpine skier (born 1989)

Lyaysan Rayanova (born February 1, 1989) is an alpine skier from Russia. She competed for Russia at the 2010 Winter Olympics. Her best result was a 33rd in the slalom.
