= Lizaveta Kuzmenka =

Belarusian alpine skier (born 1987)

Personal information
- Born: 18 April 1987 (age 39) Saint Petersburg, Russia
- Height: 1.68 m (5 ft 6 in)

Skiing career
- Sport: Alpine skiing
- Disciplines: Giant slalom, slalom

Olympics
- Teams: 1 – 2010
- Medals: 0 (0 gold)

Lizaveta Kuzmenka (born 18 April 1987) is an alpine skier from Belarus. She competed for Belarus at the 2010 Winter Olympics. Her best result was a 54th place in the giant slalom.
