= Maja Klepić =

Bosnian alpine skier (born 1988)

Maja Klepić Jokanović (born 23 May 1988) is an alpine skier from Bosnia and Herzegovina. She competed as Maja Klepić for Bosnia and Herzegovina at the 2010 Winter Olympics. Her best result was a 52nd place in the giant slalom.
