= Sanni Leinonen =

Finnish alpine skier (born 1989)

Sanni Maaria Leinonen (born November 8, 1989, in Siilinjärvi) is a former alpine skier from Finland. She competes for Finland in technical events on the World Cup. She represented Finland at the 2010 Winter Olympics. Her best result was a 30th place in the giant slalom. Her best result on the World Cup was a 7th-place finish in the slalom at Maribor, Slovenia in 2010.
