= Roger Vidosa =

Andorran alpine skier (born 1984)

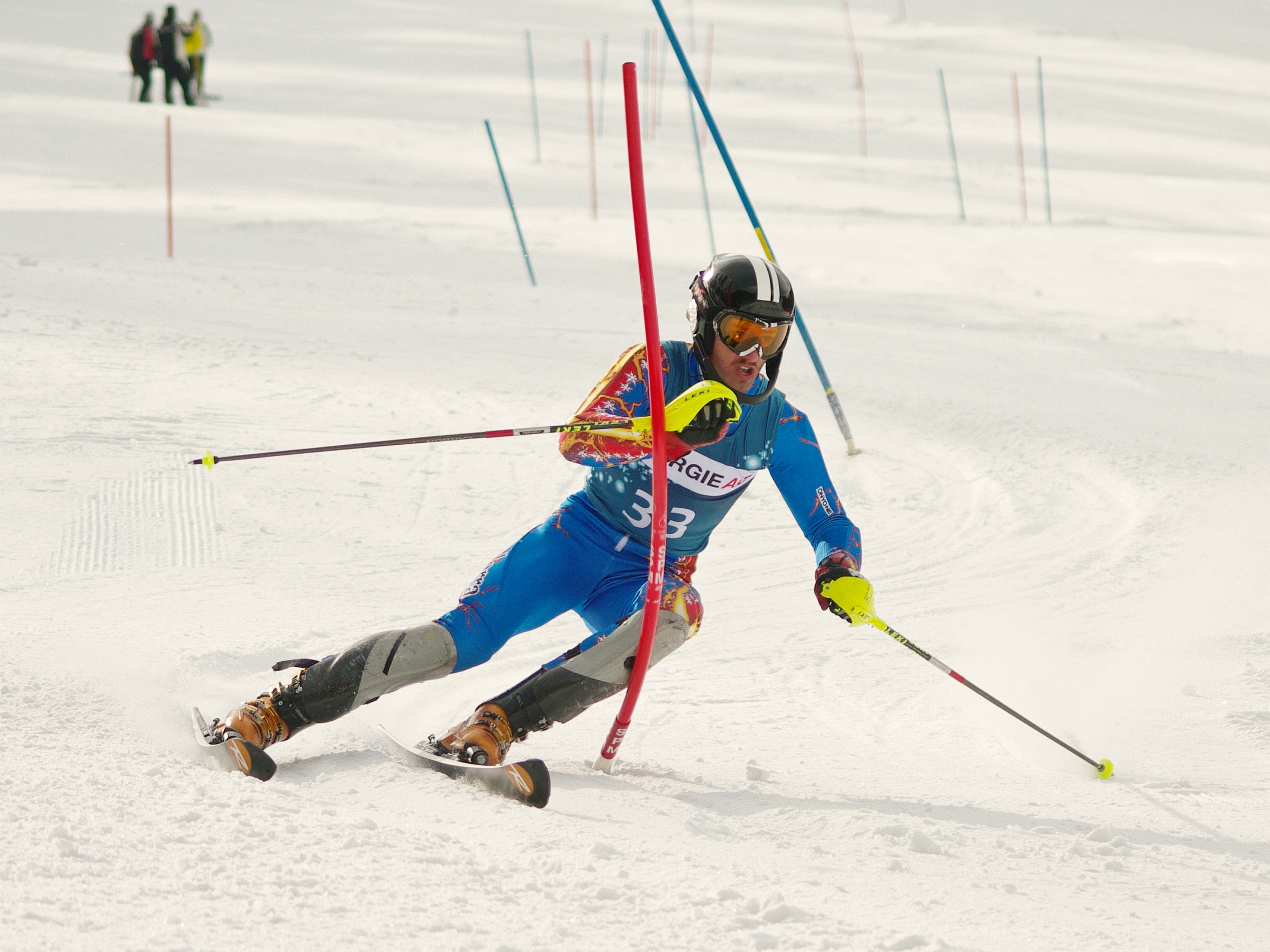

Personal information
- Full name: Roger Vidosa Riba
- Born: February 29, 1984 (age 42) La Massana, Andorra
- Height: 184 cm (6 ft 0 in)

Sport
- Sport: Skiing
- Club: Arinsal Pal

Roger Vidosa
Skiing career
- Sport: Alpine skiing
- Retired: April 2013
- Disciplines: Giant slalom, Slalom, Super Combined, Super G, Downhill

Roger Vidosa Riba (Note: In this Catalan name, the first or paternal surname is Vidosa and the second or maternal family name is Riba; both are generally joined by the conjunction "i".) (born February 29, 1984, in La Massana) is an Andorran former alpine skier. He represented Andorra at the 2006 Winter Olympics and the 2010 Winter Olympics.

== Best results ==
=== FIS Race results ===
Slalom

1st place - 5 times
2nd place - 9 times
3rd place - 3 times

Giant slalom

1st place - 5 times
2nd place - 7 times
3rd place - 1 time

=== FIS World Cup ===
Super Combined - 22
Downhill - 46
Super G - 33

=== Olympic Games ===
2006 Winter Olympics

Combined - 28
Downhill - 50
Slalom - 27

2010 Winter Olympics

Downhill - 48
Super G - 33
Super combined - 25

=== World Ski Championships ===
2005 Bormio World Ski Championships

Giant slalom - 39
Slalom - 36

2007 Are World Ski Championships

Downhill - 46
Super G - 55
SuperCombined - 28

== After retirement ==
Vidosa retired as an alpine skier in April 2013. After retirement he became a ski instructor in Andorra for 5 months and then in Leeds, United Kingdom for 10 months. He took up the job of a personal trainer in July 2013 at The Gym Group in Leeds, UK for a year.

He studied at Paul Sabatier University for a year and became Strength and Conditioning Coach at Track League of Midi-Pyrénées, Toulouse Area, France, in December 2014.
