= Liene Fimbauere =

Latvian alpine skier (born 1989)

Liene Fimbauere (born 30 January 1989) is a Latvian alpine skier. She competed for Latvia at the 2010 Winter Olympics. Her best result was a 49th place in the slalom.
