= Elena Prosteva =

Russian alpine skier (born 1990)

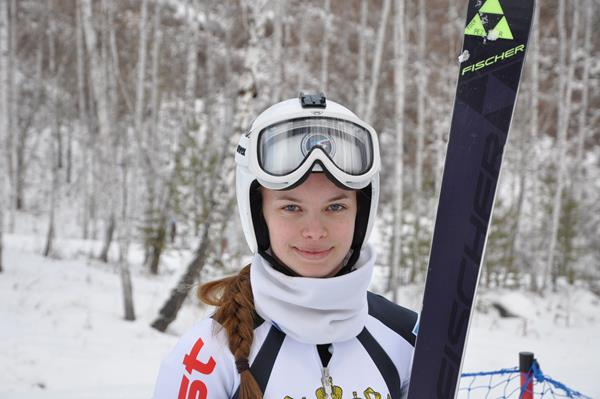

Personal information
- Nationality: Russian
- Born: November 22, 1990 (age 34)
- Height: 163 cm (64 in)
- Weight: 56 kg (123 lb)

Sport
- Country: Russia
- Sport: Skiing
- Event: Alpine Skiing

Achievements and titles
- Olympic finals: 2010 Winter Olympics: Downhill–26; Combined–DNF; Super-G–24; Giant Slalom–DNF; Slalom–28

Elena Prosteva (November 22, 1990) is a female skier from Russia. She represented Russia in the 2010 Winter Olympics, in the Alpine skiing events.

Results

2010 Winter Olympics:
Downhill–26
Combined–DNF
Super-G–24
Giant Slalom–DNF
Slalom–28
