= Mireia Gutiérrez =

Andorran alpine skier (born 1988)

Personal information
- Full name: Mireia Gutiérrez Cabanes
- Born: 9 October 1988 (age 37) Andorra la Vella, Andorra
- Height: 1.62 m (5 ft 4 in)

Skiing career
- Sport: Alpine skiing ♀
- Club: Esqui Club Ordino - Arcalís
- Retired: 2 March 2021 (age 32)
- Disciplines: Slalom
- World Cup debut: 14 December 2008 (age 20)

Olympics
- Teams: 3 – (2010, 2014, 2018)

World Championships
- Teams: 5 – (2009–2017)

World Cup
- Seasons: 9 – (2011–2019)

Mireia Gutiérrez Cabanes (Note: In this Catalan name, the first or paternal surname is Gutiérrez and the second or maternal family name is Cabanes; both are generally joined by the conjunction "i".) (born 9 October 1988) is an Andorran female former skier. She represented Andorra in the 2010 Winter Olympics, in the Alpine skiing events. She also took part in the FIS Alpine World Ski Championships 2009.

== World Cup results ==
Season	Age	Overall	Slalom	Giant slalom	Super-G	Downhill	Combined
2015	26	103	45	—	—	—	—
2016	27	didn't score world cup point					
2017	28	122	55	—	—	—	—
2018	29	didn't score world cup point					
2019	30	didn't score world cup point					

=== Results per discipline ===
Discipline	Starts	Top 30	Top 15	Top 5	Podiums	Best result		
Discipline	Starts	Top 30	Top 15	Top 5	Podiums	Date	Location	Place
Slalom	49	4	0	0	0	4 January 2015	Zagreb, Croatia	20th
Giant slalom	2	0	0	0	0	16 December 2012	Courchevel, France	42nd
Super-G	0	0	0	0	0			
Downhill	0	0	0	0	0			
Combined	3	0	0	0	0	28 February 2016	Soldeu, Andorra	32nd
Total	54	4	0	0	0			

Standings through 2 February 2019

== World Championship results ==
Year
Year	Age	Slalom	Giant; Slalom	Super G	Downhill	Combined
2009	20	DNF1	—	29	—	19
2011	22	DNF1	DNF1	DNF	—	DNF2
2013	24	DNF1	—	—	—	DNF2
2015	26	25	—	—	—	—
2017	28	34	—	—	—	—
2019	30	23	—	—	—	—

== Olympic results ==
Year
Year	Age	Slalom	Giant; Slalom	Super G	Downhill	Combined
2010	21	DNF2	DNF2	DNF	28	24
2014	25	DNF1	DNF1	—	—	18
2018	29	30	—	—	—	—

== Notees ==
Olympic Games
Preceded by Joan Tomàs Roca	Flag bearer for Andorra; Sochi 2014	Succeeded by Laura Sallés
