= Sofie Juarez =

Andorran alpine skier (born 1991)

Sofie Juárez
- Born: 9 April 1991 (age 33); Incles, Andorra

Sofie Juárez (born 9 April 1991) is an alpine skier from Andorra. She competed for Andorra at the 2010 Winter Olympics. She did not finish either of her events.
