= Andrej Križaj =

Slovenian alpine skier (born 1986)

Andrej Križaj (born 11 September 1986) is a Slovenian alpine skier.

Križaj represented Slovenia at the 2010 Winter Olympics.
