= Andrea Jardi =

Spanish alpine skier (born 1990)

Andrea Jardi Cuadrado (Note: In this Spanish name, the first or paternal surname is Jardi and the second or maternal family name is Cuadrado.) (born March 13, 1990) is an alpine skier from Spain. She competed for Spain at the 2010 Winter Olympics. She did not complete any of the events she competed in.
