= François Soulié =

Andorran cross country skier (born 1978)

Francesc Soulié
- Country: Andorra
- Full name: François Jacques Soulié
- Born: 22 March 1978 (age 46); Carcassonne, Aude, France
- Height: 181 cm (5 ft 11 in)

François Jacques "Francesc" Soulié (born 22 March 1978) is an Andorran cross-country skier who has competed since 1999. Competing in two Winter Olympics, he earned his best finish of 47th in the 50 km event at Vancouver in 2010.

Soulié's best finish at the FIS Nordic World Ski Championships was 51st in the team sprint at Sapporo in 2007.

His best World Cup finish was 24th in the team sprint at the China in 2007.
