= Kevin Esteve =

Andorran alpine skier (born 1989)

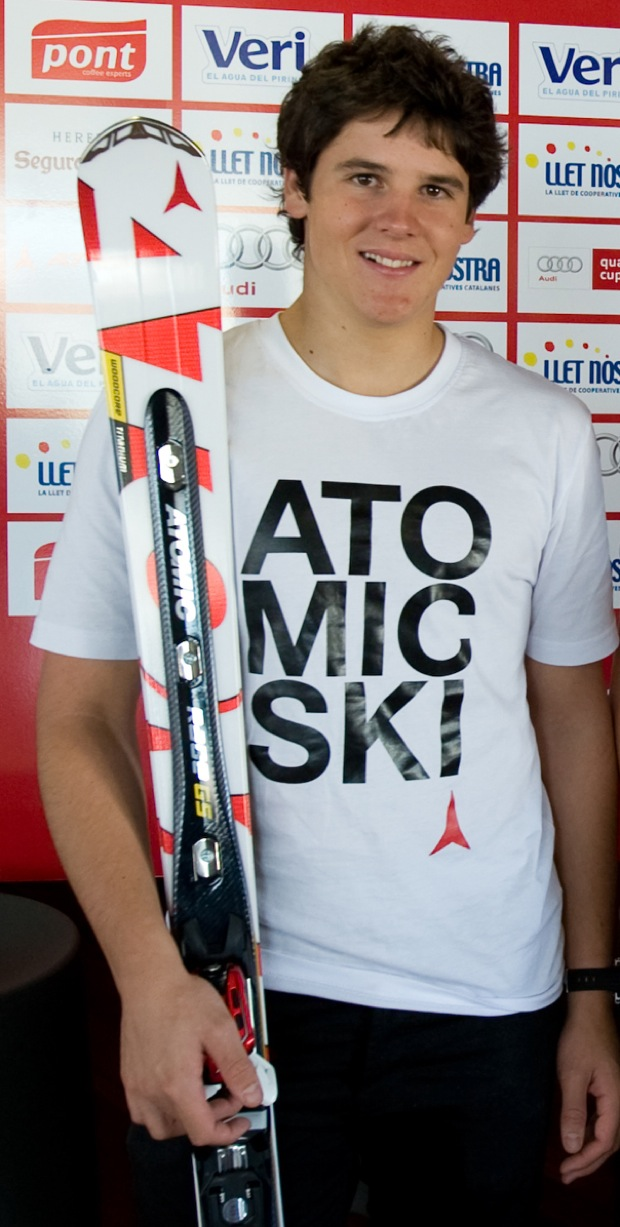
- Esteve in 2013

Personal information
- Full name: Kevin Esteve Rigail
- Born: 27 December 1989 (age 36) Andorra
- Education: A School
- Height: 180 cm (5 ft 11 in)
- Weight: 80 kg (176 lb)

Sport
- Country: Andorra
- Sport: Alpine skiing
- Golf career
- Full name: Kevin Esteve Rigail
- Nationality: Andorra
- Sport: Golf
- Turned professional: 2015
- Current tour: MENA Tour
- Former tours: Alps Tour; Professional Golf Tour of India; Nordic Golf League
- Professional wins: 1

Kevin Esteve Rigail (born 27 December 1989) is an alpine skier and professional golfer from Andorra. He competed for Andorra at the 2010 Winter Olympics.

== Golf career ==
Esteve turned professional in 2015 after breaking his knee in 2014. He has primarily played on the Alps Tour, MENA Tour and Nordic Golf League.

=== Professional wins (1) ===
==== Toro Tour wins (1) ====
No.	Date	Tournament	Winning score	Margin of victory	Runner-up
1	12 Feb 2022	Azata Golf 1	−2 (77-69-65=211)	2 strokes	(Wales) Jake Hapgood
