= Ski jumping at the 2010 Winter Olympics – Normal hill individual =

Men's normal hill individual at the XXI Olympic Winter Games
- Venue: Whistler Olympic Park
- Dates: 12–13 February 2010
- Competitors: 61 from 18 nations
- Winning Score: 276.5

Medalists
| 1st place, gold medalist(s) | | Simon Ammann | Switzerland |
| 2nd place, silver medalist(s) | | Adam Małysz | Poland |
| 3rd place, bronze medalist(s) | | Gregor Schlierenzauer | Austria |

The men's normal hill individual ski jumping competition for the 2010 Winter Olympics in Vancouver, Canada was held on 12 and 13 February 2010 at Whistler Olympic Park in Whistler, British Columbia. It was the first medal event of the 2010 Games.

Sixty-one athletes took part in the qualifying round of the competition, from which 50 athletes advanced to the two competition rounds. Swiss athlete Simon Ammann had the longest jumps in both competition rounds, winning the gold medal. The silver medal was won by Polish jumper Adam Małysz who had the third best results in both the first and second competition rounds. German jumper Michael Uhrmann was in second place following the first jump, but did poorly on his second jump and ended up fifth in the overall standings. Gregor Schlierenzauer of Austria moved up from seventh place to win the bronze medal after jumping a full 5 meters (16 ft) longer on his second attempt.

== Background ==
The men's normal hill individual ski jumping competition for the 2010 Winter Olympics was held on 12 and 13 February 2010 at Whistler Olympic Park in Whistler, British Columbia. It was the first medal event of the 2010 Games.

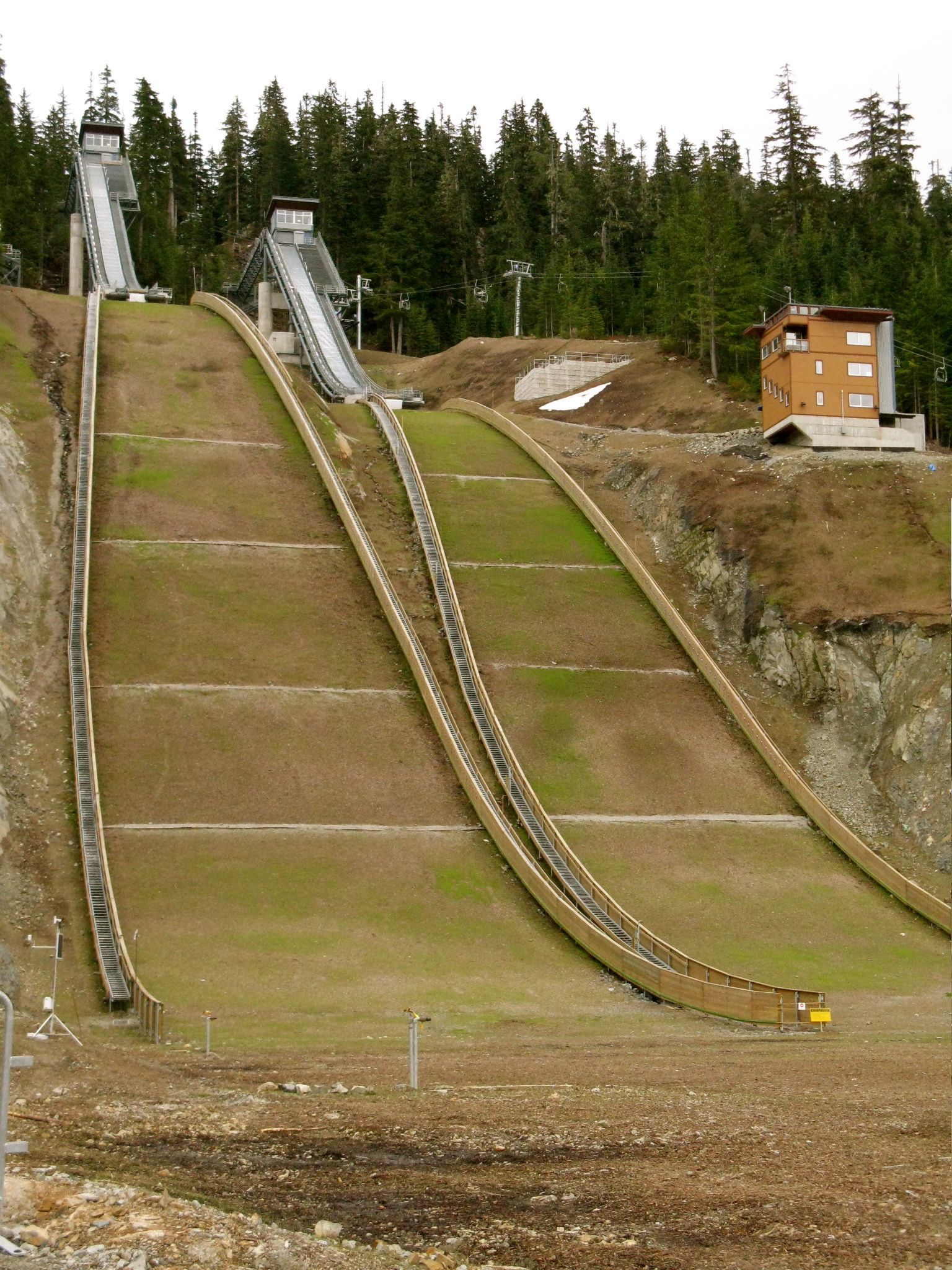
The ski jumps at Whistler Olympic Park in warmer weather

A normal hill in ski jumping is defined as a jump in which the width of the hill ranges from 85 meters (279 ft) to 109 meters (358 ft). Skiers ski down a sloped ramp, which then turns flat into a takeoff jump, and complete their jump on a landing slope. The rules of international ski jumping competitions, set by the governing body for ski jumping, the Fédération Internationale de Ski, award points based on two factors: distance and judge's score. Distance is measured from the edge of the takeoff ramp to the point where the jumper first touches the landing slope. The three judges are able to award up to 20 points each, for a total of 60 points. The judge's scores are based on a variety of factors including the timing of the takeoff, the skier's ability to carry out the movements involved in the jump, and their stability in the air.

== The field ==
Allocation of slots in the Olympic ski jumping competition was based upon the World Ranking List (WRL) consisting of Ski Jumping World Cup and Grand Prix points, followed by Continental Cup Standings from the 2008-09 and 2009-10 Ski Jumping World Cup, with no nation being allowed more than five skiers.

Norway's Lars Bystøl was the defending Olympic champion on the normal hill, but he retired after the 2007-08 season and therefore did not participate in the 2010 Games. However, The 2006 large hill gold medalist, Austrian Thomas Morgenstern was present. Morgenstern had won the last scheduled normal hill event of the World Cup (on 14 December 2007 in Villach, Austria), and was expected to be among the strongest competitors in the event. The last World Cup event in this discipline took place on 8 March 2009 at Lahti, Finland (though it was originally scheduled to be a large hill event) and was won by Gregor Schlierenzauer of Austria. Although a relative newcomer to the sport, having only started competing in 2005-06, Schlierenzauer entered the competition with thirty-five World Cup victories under his belt.

Other competitors expected to finish strongly included Poland's Adam Małysz and Finland's Janne Ahonen, the latter of whom had come out of retirement in hopes of winning an Olympic medal. Simon Ammann, who had won gold medals in both normal and large hill competitions at the 2002 Winter Olympics but failed to medal in 2006, was expected to be a strong competitor as well. Wolfgang Loitzl of Austria was the defending world champion.

== Qualifying ==
The qualifying round for the men's normal hill individual event took place on 12 February with a trial qualification at 09:00 PST and a qualification round at 10:00 PST the same day. Sixty-one athletes participated in the qualification round, with ten pre-qualified, including all four athletes from Austria. The forty athletes with the highest scores advanced to the medal round on 13 February, joining the ten pre-qualified jumpers.

Roberto Dellasega of Italy was disqualified, and therefore excluded from any opportunity to advance. Norway's Anders Jacobsen did not show, but because he was pre-qualifie,d he advanced to the competition round anyway. The top finisher in the qualifying round was Michael Uhrmann of Germany. His countryman Michael Neumayer, had the second-longest jump but placed third to Czech jumper Jakub Janda because of Janda's higher judge's score. All four jumpers from the host country of Canada failed to qualify.

== Competition Rounds ==
The final competition, consisting of two jumps, took place on 13 February. The top thirty jumpers after the first jump qualified for the second jump. The combined total points over the two jumps was used to determine the final ranking. A practice round took place at 08:30 PST, with the first and second rounds of the event taking place at 09:45 PST and 10:45 PST respectively.

Simon Ammann of Switzerland landed the longest distance in the first jump, 105 meters. Following the first jump, Michael Uhrmann of Germany was the second-placed jumper, followed by Adam Małysz of Poland. Austrian jumper Thomas Morgenstern was just outside of the medal positions in fourth place, whereas his countryman Gregor Schlierenzauer, was 7.5 points behind and in seventh place. Harri Olli of Finland had a 97.5 meters jump with 116.0 points, and would have been eligible to jump in the final roun, but was disqualified.

In the second jump, Ammann again landed the longest jump, reaching a distance of 108 meters. After Ammann landed the jump, he immediately began pumping his arms in the air, confident that he had secured the gold medal. Uhrmann, second after the first round, was one of the few competitors who had a shorter jump in the final round, placing tenth in the final round and fifth overall. Among the jumpers who surpassed him was Adam Małysz, who again took third place in the final round and finished in second overall, winning the silver medal. The bronze was won by Gregor Schlierenzauer, whose significantly better performance in the final round netted him second place for the round and third overall. Schlierenzauer's second jump was a full five meters longer than his first, the single largest improvement between the two rounds by any competitor. Uhrmann's fifth-place finish was the top result by an athlete not pre-qualified for the competition round.

== Results ==
=== Qualifying ===
| Rank | Bib | Name | Country | Distance (m) | Distance Points | Judges Points | Total | Notes |
|---|---|---|---|---|---|---|---|---|
| 1 | 51 | Michael Uhrmann | Germany | 106.0 | 82.0 | 56.5 | 138.5 | Q |
| 2 | 44 | Jakub Janda | Czech Republic | 105.0 | 80.0 | 55.5 | 135.5 | Q |
| 3 | 45 | Michael Neumayer | Germany | 105.5 | 81.0 | 54.0 | 135.0 | Q |
| 4 | 43 | Antonín Hájek | Czech Republic | 105.0 | 80.0 | 54.5 | 134.5 | Q |
| 5 | 49 | Daiki Ito | Japan | 104.5 | 79.0 | 55.5 | 134.5 | Q |
| 6 | 46 | Noriaki Kasai | Japan | 105.5 | 81.0 | 52.5 | 133.5 | Q |
| 7 | 48 | Harri Olli | Finland | 105.0 | 80.0 | 53.5 | 133.5 | Q |
| 8 | 24 | Janne Happonen | Finland | 104.5 | 79.0 | 54.0 | 133.0 | Q |
| 9 | 40 | Martin Schmitt | Germany | 103.5 | 77.0 | 55.5 | 132.5 | Q |
| 10 | 41 | Tom Hilde | Norway | 103.5 | 77.0 | 55.0 | 132.0 | Q |
| 11 | 35 | Kalle Keituri | Finland | 103.0 | 76.0 | 54.0 | 130.0 | Q |
| 12 | 42 | Kamil Stoch | Poland | 103.0 | 76.0 | 51.5 | 127.5 | Q |
| 13 | 29 | Peter Prevc | Slovenia | 101.5 | 73.0 | 54.0 | 127.0 | Q |
| 13 | 47 | Emmanuel Chedal | France | 102.0 | 74.0 | 53.0 | 127.0 | Q |
| 15 | 34 | Krzysztof Mietus | Poland | 101.5 | 73.0 | 53.5 | 126.5 | Q |
| 15 | 38 | Jernej Damjan | Slovenia | 102.5 | 75.0 | 51.5 | 126.5 | Q |
| 17 | 22 | Stefan Hula | Poland | 101.5 | 73.0 | 52.5 | 125.5 | Q |
| 18 | 23 | Vincent Descombes Sevoie | France | 100.5 | 71.0 | 52.5 | 123.5 | Q |
| 18 | 25 | Roman Koudelka | Czech Republic | 100.0 | 70.0 | 53.5 | 123.5 | Q |
| 18 | 50 | Pascal Bodmer | Germany | 100.5 | 71.0 | 52.5 | 123.5 | Q |
| 21 | 33 | Anders Bardal | Norway | 99.5 | 69.0 | 53.5 | 122.5 | Q |
| 22 | 17 | Kim Hyun-Ki | South Korea | 99.0 | 68.0 | 53.5 | 121.5 | Q |
| 23 | 5 | Volodymyr Boshchuk | Ukraine | 99.0 | 68.0 | 52.5 | 120.5 | Q |
| 23 | 37 | Andreas Kuettel | Switzerland | 99.0 | 68.0 | 52.5 | 120.5 | Q |
| 25 | 8 | David Lazzaroni | France | 97.5 | 65.0 | 52.5 | 117.5 | Q |
| 26 | 26 | Denis Kornilov | Russia | 97.5 | 65.0 | 52.0 | 117.0 | Q |
| 27 | 27 | Primoz Pikl | Slovenia | 97.5 | 65.0 | 51.5 | 116.5 | Q |
| 27 | 28 | Pavel Karelin | Russia | 97.5 | 65.0 | 51.5 | 116.5 | Q |
| 29 | 15 | Alexey Korolev | Kazakhstan | 97.0 | 64.0 | 52.0 | 116.0 | Q |
| 30 | 7 | Peter Frenette | United States | 97.0 | 64.0 | 51.0 | 115.0 | Q |
| 31 | 18 | Nikolay Karpenko | Kazakhstan | 97.0 | 64.0 | 50.5 | 114.5 | Q |
| 32 | 30 | Andrea Morassi | Italy | 96.5 | 63.0 | 51.0 | 114.0 | Q |
| 33 | 20 | Dimitry Ipatov | Russia | 96.0 | 62.0 | 51.5 | 113.5 | Q |
| 33 | 31 | Taku Takeuchi | Japan | 96.0 | 62.0 | 51.5 | 113.5 | Q |
| 35 | 13 | Nicholas Alexander | United States | 96.0 | 62.0 | 51.0 | 113.0 | Q |
| 35 | 36 | Sebastian Colloredo | Italy | 96.0 | 62.0 | 51.0 | 113.0 | Q |
| 37 | 21 | Vitaliy Shumbarets | Ukraine | 95.5 | 61.0 | 51.0 | 112.0 | Q |
| 37 | 32 | Lukáš Hlava | Czech Republic | 95.5 | 61.0 | 51.0 | 112.0 | Q |
| 39 | 39 | Shōhei Tochimoto | Japan | 95.0 | 60.0 | 51.0 | 111.0 | Q |
| 40 | 2 | Anders Johnson | United States | 93.5 | 57.0 | 51.5 | 108.5 | Q |
| 40 | 14 | Choi Heung-Chul | South Korea | 93.5 | 57.0 | 51.5 | 108.5 | Q |
| 42 | 4 | Tomas Zmoray | Slovakia | 94.0 | 58.0 | 49.5 | 107.5 | |
| 43 | 10 | Choi Yong-Jik | South Korea | 93.5 | 57.0 | 50.0 | 107.0 | |
| 44 | 9 | Mackenzie Boyd-Clowes | Canada | 92.5 | 55.0 | 50.0 | 105.0 | |
| 45 | 19 | Ilya Rosliakov | Russia | 92.0 | 54.0 | 50.5 | 104.5 | |
| 46 | 6 | Trevor Morrice | Canada | 92.0 | 54.0 | 49.5 | 103.5 | |
| 47 | 3 | Stefan Read | Canada | 91.5 | 53.0 | 50.0 | 103.0 | |
| 48 | 12 | Oleksandr Lazarovych | Ukraine | 90.5 | 51.0 | 49.0 | 100.0 | |
| 49 | 1 | Eric Mitchell | Canada | 89.0 | 48.0 | 50.5 | 98.5 | |
| 50 | 11 | Alexandre Mabboux | France | 89.0 | 48.0 | 49.5 | 97.5 | |
| * | 52 | Robert Kranjec | Slovenia | 102.0 | 74.0 | N/A | N/A | Q, |
| * | 53 | Bjørn Einar Romøren | Norway | 97.5 | 65.0 | N/A | N/A | Q, |
| * | 54 | Anders Jacobsen | Norway | N/A | N/A | N/A | N/A | Q, |
| * | 55 | Janne Ahonen | Finland | 102.0 | 74.0 | N/A | N/A | Q, |
| * | 56 | Adam Małysz | Poland | 105.0 | 81.0 | N/A | N/A | Q, |
| * | 57 | Wolfgang Loitzl | Austria | 103.5 | 77.0 | N/A | N/A | Q, |
| * | 58 | Andreas Kofler | Austria | 105.0 | 80.0 | N/A | N/A | Q, |
| * | 59 | Thomas Morgenstern | Austria | 105.5 | 81.0 | N/A | N/A | Q, |
| * | 60 | Gregor Schlierenzauer | Austria | 107.0 | 84.0 | N/A | N/A | Q, |
| * | 61 | Simon Ammann | Switzerland | 103.0 | 76.0 | N/A | N/A | Q, |
| | 16 | Roberto Dellasega | Italy | 0.0 | 0.0 | 0.0 | 0.0 | DSQ |

1: These skiers were pre-qualified; they did perform jumps in the qualification round, but were not ranked with the non-pre-qualified jumpers.

=== Final ===
| Rank | Bib | Name | Country | Round 1 Distance (m) | Round 1 Points | Round 1 Rank | Final Round Distance (m) | Final Round Points | Final Round Rank | Total Points |
|---|---|---|---|---|---|---|---|---|---|---|
| 1st place, gold medalist(s) | 51 | Simon Ammann | Switzerland | 105.0 | 135.5 | 1 | 108.0 | 141.0 | 1 | 276.5 |
| 2nd place, silver medalist(s) | 46 | Adam Małysz | Poland | 103.5 | 132.5 | 3 | 105.0 | 137.0 | 3 | 269.5 |
| 3rd place, bronze medalist(s) | 50 | Gregor Schlierenzauer | Austria | 101.5 | 128.0 | 7 | 106.5 | 140.0 | 2 | 268.0 |
| 4 | 45 | Janne Ahonen | Finland | 102.0 | 129.5 | 5 | 104.0 | 133.5 | 5 | 263.0 |
| 5 | 41 | Michael Uhrmann | Germany | 103.5 | 133.0 | 2 | 102.0 | 129.5 | 10 | 262.5 |
| 6 | 42 | Robert Kranjec | Slovenia | 102.0 | 129.0 | 6 | 102.5 | 130.5 | 8 | 259.5 |
| 7 | 19 | Peter Prevc | Slovenia | 100.0 | 124.0 | 13 | 104.5 | 135.0 | 4 | 259.0 |
| 8 | 49 | Thomas Morgenstern | Austria | 102.0 | 130.0 | 4 | 101.5 | 128.5 | 11 | 258.5 |
| 9 | 44 | Anders Jacobsen | Norway | 99.5 | 123.5 | 15 | 104.0 | 133.5 | 5 | 257.0 |
| 10 | 30 | Martin Schmitt | Germany | 99.5 | 123.0 | 16 | 103.5 | 133.0 | 7 | 256.0 |
| 11 | 47 | Wolfgang Loitzl | Austria | 100.0 | 124.5 | 12 | 102.5 | 130.5 | 8 | 255.0 |
| 12 | 31 | Tom Hilde | Norway | 100.0 | 124.0 | 13 | 101.5 | 128.0 | 12 | 252.0 |
| 12 | 15 | Roman Koudelka | Czech Republic | 101.5 | 127.0 | 9 | 100.5 | 125.0 | 13 | 252.0 |
| 14 | 34 | Jakub Janda | Czech Republic | 101.0 | 127.5 | 8 | 99.5 | 123.0 | 18 | 250.5 |
| 15 | 39 | Daiki Ito | Japan | 100.5 | 125.0 | 10 | 100.0 | 124.5 | 14 | 249.5 |
| 16 | 35 | Michael Neumayer | Germany | 101.0 | 125.0 | 10 | 99.5 | 122.0 | 19 | 247.0 |
| 17 | 36 | Noriaki Kasai | Japan | 99.0 | 120.5 | 19 | 100.5 | 124.0 | 15 | 244.5 |
| 18 | 23 | Anders Bardal | Norway | 98.0 | 118.5 | 22 | 100.0 | 124.0 | 15 | 242.5 |
| 19 | 48 | Andreas Kofler | Austria | 98.0 | 121.0 | 17 | 98.5 | 120.5 | 21 | 241.5 |
| 19 | 14 | Janne Happonen | Finland | 97.5 | 117.5 | 25 | 100.0 | 124.0 | 15 | 241.5 |
| 21 | 33 | Antonin Hajek | Czech Republic | 98.5 | 121.0 | 17 | 98.0 | 118.5 | 22 | 239.5 |
| 22 | 25 | Kalle Keituri | Finland | 97.0 | 116.0 | 27 | 99.5 | 122.0 | 19 | 238.0 |
| 23 | 43 | Bjørn Einar Romøren | Norway | 98.5 | 120.5 | 19 | 96.0 | 114.5 | 27 | 235.0 |
| 24 | 37 | Emmanuel Chedal | France | 99.0 | 120.0 | 21 | 96.5 | 114.5 | 27 | 234.5 |
| 24 | 17 | Primoz Pikl | Slovenia | 97.5 | 117.5 | 25 | 97.5 | 117.0 | 23 | 234.5 |
| 26 | 16 | Denis Kornilov | Russia | 98.0 | 118.5 | 22 | 96.5 | 114.0 | 29 | 232.5 |
| 27 | 32 | Kamil Stoch | Poland | 98.5 | 118.5 | 22 | 96.5 | 113.5 | 30 | 232.0 |
| 28 | 13 | Vincent Descombes Sevoie | France | 96.0 | 113.5 | 29 | 97.0 | 116.5 | 24 | 230.0 |
| 29 | 26 | Sebastian Colloredo | Italy | 96.0 | 114.0 | 28 | 96.5 | 115.0 | 26 | 229.0 |
| 29 | 9 | Nikolay Karpenko | Kazakhstan | 96.0 | 113.0 | 30 | 97.0 | 116.0 | 25 | 229.0 |
| 31 | 40 | Pascal Bodmer | Germany | 95.5 | 112.5 | 31 | | | | 112.5 |
| 31 | 12 | Stefan Hula | Poland | 95.0 | 112.5 | 31 | | | | 112.5 |
| 33 | 18 | Pavel Karelin | Russia | 95.0 | 111.5 | 33 | | | | 111.5 |
| 34 | 21 | Taku Takeuchi | Japan | 94.5 | 110.5 | 34 | | | | 110.5 |
| 35 | 27 | Andreas Küttel | Switzerland | 94.0 | 110.0 | 35 | | | | 110.0 |
| 36 | 24 | Krzysztof Mietus | Poland | 94.0 | 109.0 | 36 | | | | 109.0 |
| 37 | 29 | Shōhei Tochimoto | Japan | 93.5 | 108.5 | 37 | | | | 108.5 |
| 38 | 28 | Jernej Damjan | Slovenia | 93.5 | 108.0 | 38 | | | | 108.0 |
| 38 | 22 | Lukas Hlava | Czech Republic | 94.0 | 108.0 | 38 | | | | 108.0 |
| 40 | 8 | Kim Hyun-Ki | South Korea | 93.0 | 107.0 | 40 | | | | 107.0 |
| 41 | 5 | Nicholas Alexander | United States | 93.5 | 106.5 | 41 | | | | 106.5 |
| 41 | 3 | Peter Frenette | United States | 93.0 | 106.5 | 41 | | | | 106.5 |
| 43 | 20 | Andrea Morassi | Italy | 92.5 | 106.0 | 43 | | | | 106.0 |
| 44 | 7 | Alexey Korolev | Kazakhstan | 93.0 | 105.0 | 44 | | | | 105.0 |
| 45 | 11 | Vitaliy Shumbarets | Ukraine | 92.0 | 104.5 | 45 | | | | 104.5 |
| 46 | 10 | Dimitry Ipatov | Russia | 91.0 | 102.5 | 46 | | | | 102.5 |
| 47 | 4 | David Lazzaroni | France | 90.5 | 101.0 | 47 | | | | 101.0 |
| 48 | 6 | Choi Heung-Chul | South Korea | 87.5 | 95.0 | 48 | | | | 95.0 |
| 49 | 1 | Anders Johnson | United States | 86.5 | 92.5 | 49 | | | | 92.5 |
| 50 | 2 | Volodymyr Boshchuk | Ukraine | 87.5 | 91.5 | 50 | | | | 91.5 |
| | 38 | Harri Olli | Finland | | DSQ | | | | | |
