= Ski jumping at the 2010 Winter Olympics – Large hill individual =

Men's large hill individual at the XXI Olympic Winter Games
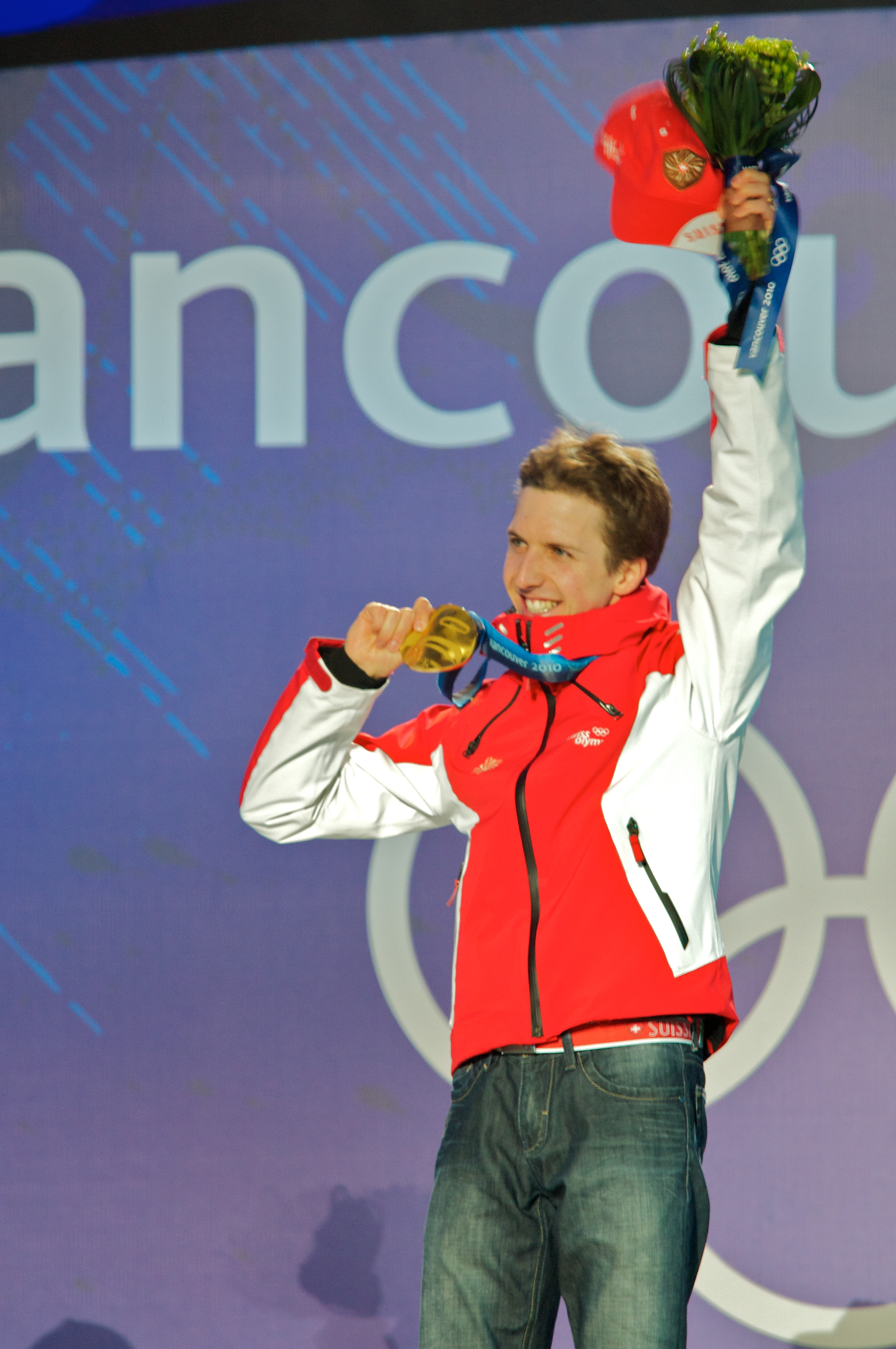
- Gold medallist Simon Ammann
- Venue: Whistler Olympic Park
- Dates: 19–20 February 2010
- Competitors: 61 from 18 nations
- Winning Score: 283.6

Medalists
1st place, gold medalist(s)		Simon Ammann	Switzerland
2nd place, silver medalist(s)		Adam Małysz	Poland
3rd place, bronze medalist(s)		Gregor Schlierenzauer	Austria

The Men's large hill individual ski jumping competition for the 2010 Winter Olympics in Vancouver, Canada was held at Whistler Olympic Park in Whistler, British Columbia. It started on 19 February and ended on 20 February. Austria's Thomas Morgenstern was the defending Olympic champion in this event. Andreas Küttel of Switzerland was the defending world champion in this event. Two test events took place at the Olympic venue on 24–25 January 2009, both won by Austria's Gregor Schlierenzauer. On the 25th, Schlierenzauer set the hill jumping record with a jump of 149.0 metres (488.8 ft) which was also tied by Finland's Ville Larinto. The last World Cup event in this format prior to the 2010 Games took place on 6 February 2010 in Willingen, Germany and was won by Schlierenzauer.

== Results ==
=== Qualifying ===
A qualifying round for this event took place on 19 February with a trial qualification at 08:30 PST and a qualification round at 10:00 PST the same day.

Rank	Bib	Name	Country	Distance (m)	Distance Points	Judges Points	Total	Notes
1	47	Noriaki Kasai	Japan	142.5	91.5	52.0	143.5	Q
2	51	Daiki Ito	Japan	139.5	86.1	56.5	142.6	Q
3	36	Matti Hautamäki	Finland	137.5	82.5	55.5	138.0	Q
3	43	Antonin Hajek	Czech Republic	137.5	82.5	55.5	138.0	Q
3	46	Andreas Wank	Germany	137.5	82.5	55.5	138.0	Q
6	50	Johan Remen Evensen	Norway	137.0	81.6	55.5	137.1	Q
7	33	Anders Bardal	Norway	136.5	80.7	56.0	136.7	Q
8	41	Tom Hilde	Norway	136.5	80.7	55.0	135.7	Q
9	49	Harri Olli	Finland	137.0	81.6	54.0	135.6	Q
10	48	Emmanuel Chedal	France	137.0	81.6	53.5	135.1	Q
11	44	Jakub Janda	Czech Republic	134.5	77.1	54.5	131.6	Q
12	45	Michael Neumayer	Germany	136.0	79.8	49.5	129.3	Q
13	24	Janne Happonen	Finland	133.0	74.4	54.0	128.4	Q
14	22	Stefan Hula	Poland	132.0	72.6	55.0	127.6	Q
14	27	Denis Kornilov	Russia	132.0	72.6	55.0	127.6	Q
16	34	Krzysztof Miętus	Poland	132.5	73.5	53.5	127.0	Q
17	42	Kamil Stoch	Poland	131.0	70.8	54.5	125.3	Q
18	35	Sebastian Colloredo	Italy	131.5	71.7	53.5	125.2	Q
19	39	Shōhei Tochimoto	Japan	130.5	69.9	53.5	123.4	Q
20	37	Andreas Küttel	Switzerland	130.0	69.0	53.5	122.5	Q
21	29	Peter Prevc	Slovenia	129.5	68.1	54.0	122.1	Q
22	32	Taku Takeuchi	Japan	129.5	68.1	53.5	121.6	Q
23	38	Jernej Damjan	Slovenia	129.5	68.1	53.0	121.1	Q
24	28	Pavel Karelin	Russia	128.5	66.3	53.0	119.3	Q
25	40	Martin Schmitt	Germany	128.0	65.4	53.5	118.9	Q
26	23	Vincent Descombes Sevoie	France	128.0	65.4	52.5	117.9	Q
27	25	Roman Koudelka	Czech Republic	127.5	64.5	52.5	117.0	Q
28	13	Nicholas Alexander	United States	127.5	64.5	52.0	116.5	Q
29	26	Martin Cikl	Czech Republic	126.0	61.8	52.5	114.3	Q
30	7	Peter Frenette	United States	126.0	61.8	52.0	113.8	Q
31	30	Andrea Morassi	Italy	124.0	58.2	51.5	109.7	Q
32	15	Alexey Korolev	Kazakhstan	123.5	57.3	52.0	109.3	Q
33	17	Kim Hyun-Ki	South Korea	123.0	56.4	52.5	108.9	Q
34	14	Choi Heung-Chul	South Korea	122.5	55.5	51.5	107.0	Q
35	8	David Lazzaroni	France	122.5	55.5	49.5	105.0	Q
36	3	Stefan Read	Canada	120.5	51.9	51.0	102.9	Q
37	20	Dimitry Ipatov	Russia	120.0	51.0	51.0	102.0	Q
38	19	Ilya Rosliakov	Russia	119.5	50.1	51.0	101.1	Q
39	31	Mitja Mežnar	Slovenia	120.0	51.0	50.0	101.0	Q
40	4	Tomáš Zmoray	Slovakia	119.5	50.1	50.5	100.6	Q
41	18	Nikolay Karpenko	Kazakhstan	119.0	49.2	51.0	100.2	
42	2	Anders Johnson	United States	117.0	45.6	50.0	95.6	
43	12	Oleksandr Lazarovych	Ukraine	116.5	44.7	49.5	94.2	
44	16	Roberto Dellasega	Italy	113.5	39.3	48.5	87.8	
45	9	Mackenzie Boyd-Clowes	Canada	111.0	34.8	49.0	83.8	
46	10	Choi Yong-Jik	South Korea	110.5	33.9	49.5	83.4	
47	5	Volodymyr Boshchuk	Ukraine	109.5	32.1	49.0	81.1	
48	11	Alexandre Mabboux	France	107.0	27.6	48.5	76.1	
49	6	Trevor Morrice	Canada	106.0	25.8	48.0	73.8	
50	21	Vitaliy Shumbarets	Ukraine	102.0	18.6	47.0	65.6	
51	1	Eric Mitchell	Canada	93.0	2.4	45.0	47.4	
*	52	Michael Uhrmann	Germany	134.5				Q,
*	53	Robert Kranjec	Slovenia	134.5				Q,
*	54	Anders Jacobsen	Norway	142.5				Q,
*	55	Janne Ahonen	Finland	126.5				Q,
*	56	Adam Małysz	Poland	133.5				Q,
*	57	Wolfgang Loitzl	Austria	125.5				Q,
*	58	Andreas Kofler	Austria	125.5				Q,
*	59	Thomas Morgenstern	Austria	129.5				Q,
*	60	Gregor Schlierenzauer	Austria	134.5				Q,
*	61	Simon Ammann	Switzerland	140.0				Q,

1: These skiers were pre-qualified; they did perform jumps in the qualification round, but were not ranked with the non-pre-qualified jumpers.

=== Final ===
The final took place on 20 February. Consisting of two jumps, the top thirty jumpers after the first jump qualify for the second jump. The combined total of the two jumps was used to determine the final ranking. A practice round for competition took place at 08:30 PST with the first and second rounds of the event taking place at 11:30 PST and 12:30 PST, respectively.

Defending Olympic champion Morgenstern finished fifth, test event winner Schlierenzauer earned bronze, and defending world champion Küttel finished a disappointing 24th. Ammann's first jump was the longest in Olympic history though it was eclipsed by Schlierenzauer in the team event two days later.

Rank	Bib	Name	Country	Round 1 Distance (m)	Round 1 Points	Round 1 Rank	Final Round Distance (m)	Final Round Points	Final Round Rank	Total Points
1st place, gold medalist(s)	50	Simon Ammann	Switzerland	144.0	144.7	1	138.0	138.9	1	283.6
2nd place, silver medalist(s)	45	Adam Małysz	Poland	137.0	138.1	2	133.5	131.3	6	269.4
3rd place, bronze medalist(s)	49	Gregor Schlierenzauer	Austria	130.5	125.4	5	136.0	136.8	2	262.2
4	47	Andreas Kofler	Austria	131.5	127.2	4	135.0	134.0	4	261.2
5	48	Thomas Morgenstern	Austria	129.5	123.6	7	129.5	123.1	8	246.7
6	34	Michael Neumayer	Germany	130.0	122.5	8	130.0	123.0	9	245.5
7	32	Antonin Hajek	Czech Republic	128.0	119.4	9	129.0	121.2	12	240.6
8	36	Noriaki Kasai	Japan	121.5	105.7	21	135.0	133.5	5	239.2
9	42	Robert Kranjec	Slovenia	118.5	99.3	27	135.5	134.4	3	233.7
10	46	Wolfgang Loitzl	Austria	129.5	124.1	6	121.5	106.2	22	230.3
11	30	Tom Hilde	Norway	124.0	111.2	15	126.5	116.7	13	227.9
12	43	Anders Jacobsen	Norway	128.0	119.4	9	122.5	107.0	21	226.4
13	37	Emmanuel Chedal	France	118.5	99.8	25	131.5	125.7	7	225.5
14	31	Kamil Stoch	Poland	126.0	114.3	13	123.5	109.8	20	224.1
15	39	Johan Remen Evensen	Norway	123.5	109.3	17	126.0	114.3	14	223.6
16	18	Peter Prevc	Slovenia	124.5	111.6	14	124.0	110.7	16	222.3
17	33	Jakub Janda	Czech Republic	126.5	115.2	12	121.5	106.2	23	221.4
18	38	Harri Olli	Finland	117.0	95.6	30	129.0	122.2	10	217.8
19	11	Stefan Hula	Poland	122.5	106.5	20	124.0	110.7	17	217.2
20	40	Daiki Ito	Japan	117.0	95.6	30	128.5	121.3	11	216.9
21	12	Vincent Descombes Sevoie	France	120.0	101.0	23	124.5	110.6	19	211.6
22	22	Anders Bardal	Norway	119.0	100.7	24	124.0	110.7	18	211.4
23	14	Roman Koudelka	Czech Republic	117.5	97.0	29	125.0	111.5	15	208.5
24	26	Andreas Küttel	Switzerland	121.5	105.2	22	119.0	99.7	25	204.9
25	41	Michael Uhrmann	Germany	122.5	108.0	18	116.5	94.7	27	202.7
26	25	Matti Hautamäki	Finland	134.0	131.7	3	104.0	70.7	30	202.4
27	24	Sebastian Colloredo	Italy	118.5	99.3	27	120.5	102.9	24	202.2
28	35	Andreas Wank	Germany	127.5	118.0	11	110.0	82.5	28	200.5
29	20	Mitja Mežnar	Slovenia	119.0	99.7	26	118.5	98.8	26	198.5
30	29	Martin Schmitt	Germany	122.5	108.0	18	108.0	74.4	29	182.4
31	44	Janne Ahonen	Finland	125.0	111.0	16		DNS		111.0
32	3	Peter Frenette	United States	114.5	90.6	32				
33	27	Jernej Damjan	Slovenia	114.0	89.7	33				
34	4	David Lazzaroni	France	112.0	85.6	34				
35	16	Denis Kornilov	Russia	111.5	85.2	35				
36	23	Krzysztof Miętus	Poland	111.5	84.7	36				
37	21	Taku Takeuchi	Japan	110.5	83.9	37				
38	17	Pavel Karelin	Russia	109.0	80.2	38				
39	7	Alexey Korolev	Kazakhstan	108.5	79.8	39				
40	5	Nicholas Alexander	United States	109.0	79.2	40				
41	15	Martin Cikl	Czech Republic	108.0	78.4	41				
42	8	Kim Hyun-Ki	South Korea	107.5	78.0	42				
43	2	Tomáš Zmoray	Slovakia	108.0	77.4	43				
44	9	Ilya Rosliakov	Russia	105.5	73.9	44				
45	28	Shōhei Tochimoto	Japan	105.5	73.4	45				
46	1	Stefan Read	Canada	104.5	71.6	46				
47	10	Dimitry Ipatov	Russia	100.5	63.9	47				
48	19	Andrea Morassi	Italy	100.5	59.9	48				
49	6	Choi Heung-Chul	South Korea	98.5	56.3	49				
	13	Janne Happonen	Finland	122.0	105.6	DSQ				
