= Nordic skiing at the 2010 Winter Olympics =

At the 2010 Winter Olympics, eighteen Nordic skiing events were contested – twelve cross-country skiing events, three ski jumping events, and three Nordic combined events.

Nordic skiing discipline	Men's events	Women's events
Cross-country skiing	15 km freestyle (interval start); 15 km + 15 km pursuit; 50 km classical (mass start); 4 × 10 km relay; Individual sprint; Team sprint	10 km freestyle (interval start); 7.5 km + 7.5 km pursuit; 30 km classical (mass start); 4 × 5 km relay; Individual sprint; Team sprint
Ski jumping	Individual normal hill; Individual large hill; Team large hill	none
Nordic combined	Normal hill/10 km; Large hill/10 km; Team large hill/4 × 5 km	none
