= Ukraine at the 2010 Winter Olympics =

- IOC code: UKR
- NOC: National Olympic Committee of Ukraine
- Website: www.noc-ukr.org (in Ukrainian and English)

in Vancouver
- Competitors: 47 (24 men, 23 women) in 9 sports
- Flag bearer: Liliya Ludan
- Medals: Gold 0 Silver 0 Bronze 0 Total 0

Winter Olympics appearances (overview)
- 1994; 1998; 2002; 2006; 2010; 2014; 2018; 2022; 2026

Other related appearances
- Czechoslovakia (1924–1936); Poland (1924–1936); Romania (1924–1936); Soviet Union (1956–1988); Unified Team (1992)

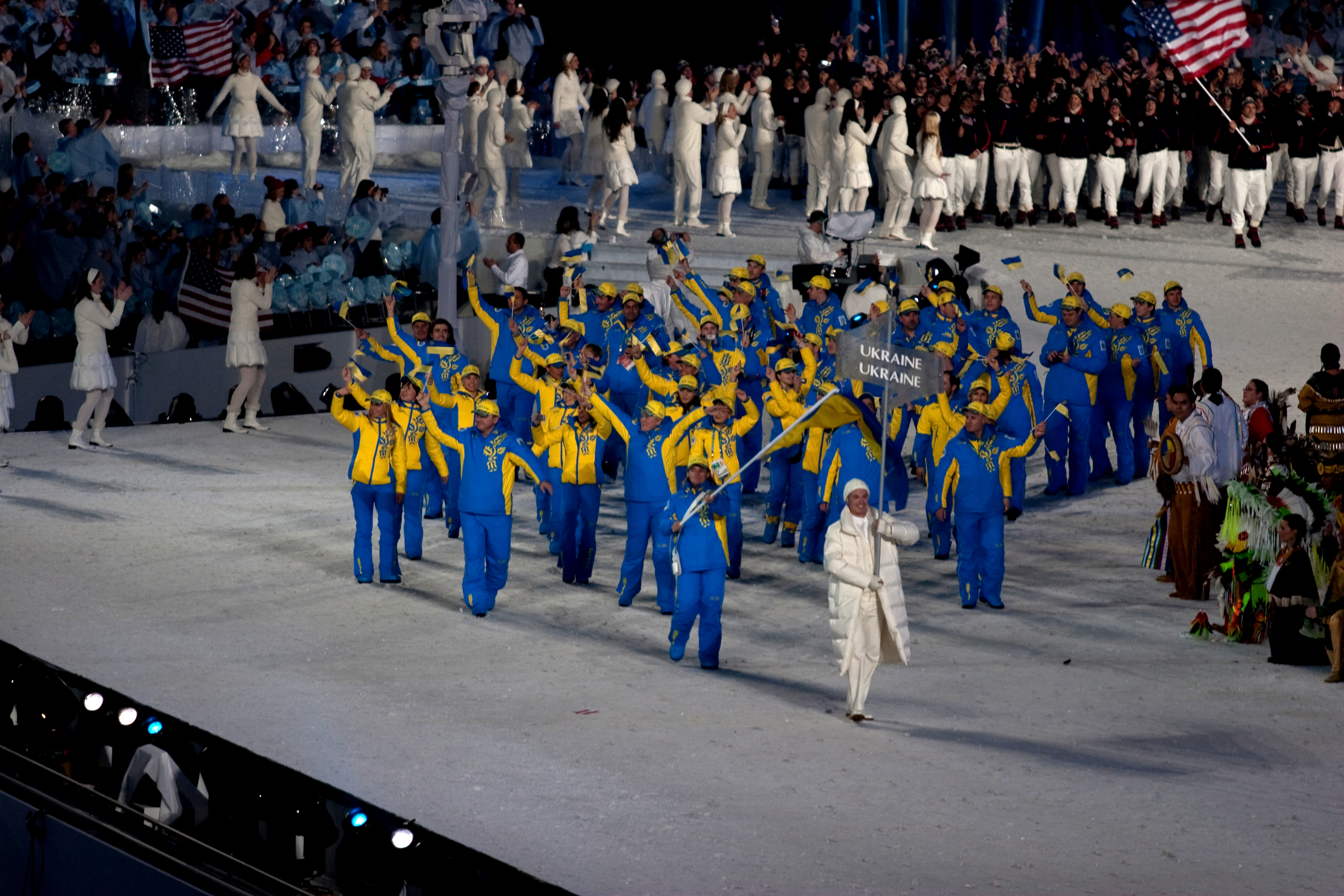
The athletes entering the stadium during the opening ceremonies.

Ukraine participated at the 2010 Winter Olympics in Vancouver, British Columbia, Canada.

Although ahead of the start of the Olympic Games, the Ministry for Affairs of Family, Youth Policy, and Sport expected Ukrainians to win medals in figure skating, freestyle, tobogganing and skiing, the Ukrainian national team completed its performance in the Olympic Games without any medals.

== Competitors ==
The following is the list of number of competitors participating at the Games per sport/discipline.

Sport	Men	Women	Total
Alpine skiing	1	2	3
Biathlon	5	6	11
Cross-country	2	6	8
Figure skating	4	3	7
Freestyle skiing	3	3	6
Luge	4	2	6
Nordic combined	1	0	1
Ski jumping	3	0	3
Snowboarding	1	1	2
Total	24	23	47

== Alpine skiing ==
Men

Athlete	Event	Run 1	Rank	Run 2	Rank	Total	Rank
Rostyslav Feshchuk	Giant slalom	1:29.79	77	1:32.74	67	3:02.53	68
Rostyslav Feshchuk	Slalom	55.35	45	58.44	39	1:53.79	39

Women

Athlete	Event	Run 1	Rank	Run 2	Rank	Total	Rank
Anastasiya Skryabina	Super-G	1:28.60	34				34
Anastasiya Skryabina	Slalom		DNF				DNF
Anastasiya Skryabina	Giant slalom		DSQ				DSQ
Bogdana Matsotska	Slalom	56.46	43	56.54	37	1:53.00	37
Bogdana Matsotska	Giant slalom	1:23.04	49	1:18.94	46	2:41.98	44

== Biathlon ==
Men

Athlete	Event	Final		
Athlete	Event	Time	Misses	Rank
Andriy Deryzemlya	Sprint	24:48.5	2 (2+0)	5
Andriy Deryzemlya	Pursuit	35:48.7	6 (1+0+3+2)	26
Andriy Deryzemlya	Individual	52:19.1	3 (0+2+0+1)	27
Andriy Deryzemlya	Mass start	37:43.9	5 (0+2+3+0)	26
Serhiy Sednev	Sprint	25:57.2	0 (0+0)	22
Serhiy Sednev	Pursuit	34:50.0	0 (0+0+0+0)	10
Serhiy Sednev	Individual	55:47.1	4 (0+3+0+1)	68
Serhiy Sednev	Mass start	37:02.8	2 (0+0+2+0)	21
Serhiy Semenov	Sprint	26:20.5	1 (0+1)	33
Serhiy Semenov	Pursuit	36:55.7	4 (3+1+0+0)	39
Serhiy Semenov	Individual	53:57.5	3 (1+0+1+1)	52
Vyacheslav Derkach	Sprint	28:22.9	3 (0+3)	77
Oleksandr Bilanenko	Individual	52:00.3	1 (0+1+0+0)	22
Oleksandr Bilanenko; Andriy Deryzemlya; Vyacheslav Derkach; Serhiy Sednev	Team relay	1:24:25.1; 20:38.7; 20:44.3; 21:47.3; 21:14.8	0+1 0+3; 0+0 0+1; 0+1 0+1; 0+0 0+0; 0+0 0+1	7

Women

Athlete	Event	Final		
Athlete	Event	Time	Misses	Rank
Oksana Khvostenko	Sprint	20:38.9	0 (0+0)	11
Oksana Khvostenko	Pursuit	32:50.3	1 (0+0+1+0)	22
Oksana Khvostenko	Individual	42:38.6	0 (0+0+0+0)	8
Oksana Khvostenko	Mass start	39:11.0	3 (0+2+1+0)	29
Olena Pidhrushna	Sprint	20:47.3	1 (0+1)	18
Olena Pidhrushna	Pursuit	32:34.0	2 (1+0+0+1)	21
Olena Pidhrushna	Individual	44:15.9	2 (0+3+0+0)	32
Olena Pidhrushna	Mass start	36:22.8	2 (1+0+0+1)	12
Valj Semerenko	Sprint	21:08.3	2 (0+2)	23
Valj Semerenko	Pursuit	32:57.6	3 (0+1+2+0)	23
Valj Semerenko	Individual	42:44.5	1 (0+0+0+1)	13
Valj Semerenko	Mass start	37:12.5	3 (0+2+1+0)	19
Vita Semerenko	Sprint	21:42.3	3 (0+3)	34
Vita Semerenko	Pursuit	34:26.4	5 (2+0+1+2)	42
Vita Semerenko	Individual	43:30.8	2 (1+0+0+1)	22
Olena Pidhrushna; Valj Semerenko; Oksana Khvostenko; Vita Semerenko	Team relay	1:11:08.2; 17:36.9; 17:56.3; 17:44.7; 17:50.3	0+2 0+6; 0+0 0+1; 0+1 0+3; 0+1 0+0; 0+0 0+2	6

- Lyudmila Pysarenko (in team but did not participate)
- Lilia Vaygina-Efremova (in team but did not participate)

== Cross-country skiing ==
Men

Athlete	Event	Final	
Athlete	Event	Time	Rank
Roman Leybyuk	15 km freestyle	36:49.7	61
Roman Leybyuk	30 km pursuit	1:22:32.0	41
Roman Leybyuk	50 km classical	2:15:19.9	42
Olexandr Putsko	15 km freestyle	37:09.8	62
Olexandr Putsko	30 km pursuit	1:24:47.1	52

Women

Athlete	Event	Final	
Athlete	Event	Time	Rank
Valentina Shevchenko	10 km freestyle	25:51.1	9
Valentina Shevchenko	15 km pursuit	41:58.7	14
Valentina Shevchenko	30 km classical		DNF
Maryna Antsybor	10 km freestyle	41:58.7	14
Maryna Antsybor	15 km pursuit		DNF
Kateryna Hryhorenko	10 km freestyle	27:29.7	46
Kateryna Hryhorenko	30 km classical	1:35:11.4	37
Lada Nesterenko	10 km freestyle	28:06.4	57
Lada Nesterenko	30 km classical	1:41:40.1	44
Tatiana Zavaliy	15 km pursuit	42:50.7	31
Tatiana Zavaliy	30 km classical	1:34:32.3	22
Vita Jakimchuk	15 km pursuit	44:24.8	46
Tatiana Zavaliy; Kateryna Hryhorenko; Maryna Antsybor; Valentina Shevchenko	4 x 5 km relay	15:38.1; 16:16.7; 13:34.2; 13:56.7; 59:25.7	13

Athlete	Event	Semi-final		Final	
Athlete	Event	Time	Rank	Time	Rank
Kateryna Hryhorenko; Maryna Antsybor	Team sprint	19:55.6	8	Did not advance	

== Figure skating ==
Athlete(s)	Event	CD		SP/OD		FS/FD		Total	
Athlete(s)	Event	Points	Rank	Points	Rank	Points	Rank	Points	Rank
Anton Kovalevski	Men's			63.81	21	102.09	24	165.90	24
Tatiana Volosozhar / Stanislav Morozov	Pairs			62.14	9	119.64	8	181.78	8
Ekaterina Kostenko / Roman Talan	Pairs			39.54	19	81.44	20	120.98	20
Anna Zadorozhniuk / Sergei Verbillo	Ice dancing	33.87	11	50.02	16	79.26	17	163.15	16

== Freestyle skiing ==
Men's team – aerials

Athlete	Event	Qualifying		Final	
Athlete	Event	Points	Rank	Points	Rank
Stanislav Kravchuk	Aerials	197.39	19	DNQ	
Enver Ablaev	Aerials	189.41	22	DNQ	
Oleksandr Abramenko	Aerials	164.56	24	DNQ	

Women's team – aerials

Athlete	Event	Qualifying		Final	
Athlete	Event	Points	Rank	Points	Rank
Nadiya Didenko	Aerials	161.26	13	DNQ	
Olha Volkova	Aerials	160.78	14	DNQ	
Olga Polyuk	Aerials	115.73	20	DNQ	

== Luge ==
Doubles

Athletes	Run 1	Run 2	Total	Rank
Andriy Kis; Yuriy Hayduk	8.415; 42.219	8.437; 42.136	1:24.355	16
Taras Senkiv; Roman Zaharkiv	8.721; 42.767	8.639; 42.595	1:25.362	19

Women's singles

Athlete	Run 1	Run 2	Run 3	Run 4	Total	Rank
Natalya Yakuchenko	8.478; 42.119	8.473; 41.809	8.539; 42.132	8.489; 42.026	2:48.086	11
Liliya Ludan	8.660; 42.312	8.650; 42.302	8.699; 42.477	8.669; 42.364	2:49.455	19

== Nordic combined ==
Event	Athletes	Jump distance	Jump score	Jump rank	Cross-country time	Total	CC rank	Rank
Individual normal hill/10 km	Volodymyr Trachuk	85.5	49.5	45	26:18.4	29:14.4	31	41
Individual large hill/10 km	Volodymyr Trachuk	99.5	68.8	43	26:25.2	30:18.2	34	42

== Ski jumping ==
Athlete	Event	Qualifying		First round		Final		
Athlete	Event	Points	Rank	Points	Rank	Points	Total	Rank
Volodymyr Boshchuk	Normal hill	120.5	23	91.5	50	DNQ		
Volodymyr Boshchuk	Large hill	81.1	47	DNQ				
Oleksandr Lazarovych	Normal hill	100.0	48	DNQ				
Oleksandr Lazarovych	Large hill	94.2	43	DNQ				
Vitaliy Shumbarets	Normal hill	112.0	37	104.5	45	DNQ		
Vitaliy Shumbarets	Large hill	65.6	50	DNQ				

== Snowboarding ==
Men's

Athlete	Event	Qualification		Round of 16		Quarterfinals		Semifinals		Finals		
Athlete	Event	Time	Rank	Opponent	Time	Opponent	Time	Opponent	Time	Opponent	Time	Rank
Yosyf Penyak	Men's giant slalom	1:21.01	17	Did not advance								

Women's

Athlete	Event	Qualification		Round of 16	Quarterfinals	Semifinals	Finals	
Athlete	Event	Time	Rank	Opposition time	Opposition time	Opposition time	Opposition time	Rank
Annamari Chundak	Women's giant slalom	1:25.44	16 Q	Kreiner (AUT) (1); L +2.29	Did not advance			16
