= France at the 2010 Winter Olympics =

- IOC code: FRA
- NOC: French National Olympic and Sports Committee
- Website: www.franceolympique.com (in French)

in Vancouver
- Competitors: 108 in 13 sports
- Flag bearers: Vincent Defrasne (opening); Sandrine Bailly (closing)
- Medals Ranked 11th: Gold 3 Silver 2 Bronze 6 Total 11

Winter Olympics appearances (overview)
- 1924; 1928; 1932; 1936; 1948; 1952; 1956; 1960; 1964; 1968; 1972; 1976; 1980; 1984; 1988; 1992; 1994; 1998; 2002; 2006; 2010; 2014; 2018; 2022; 2026

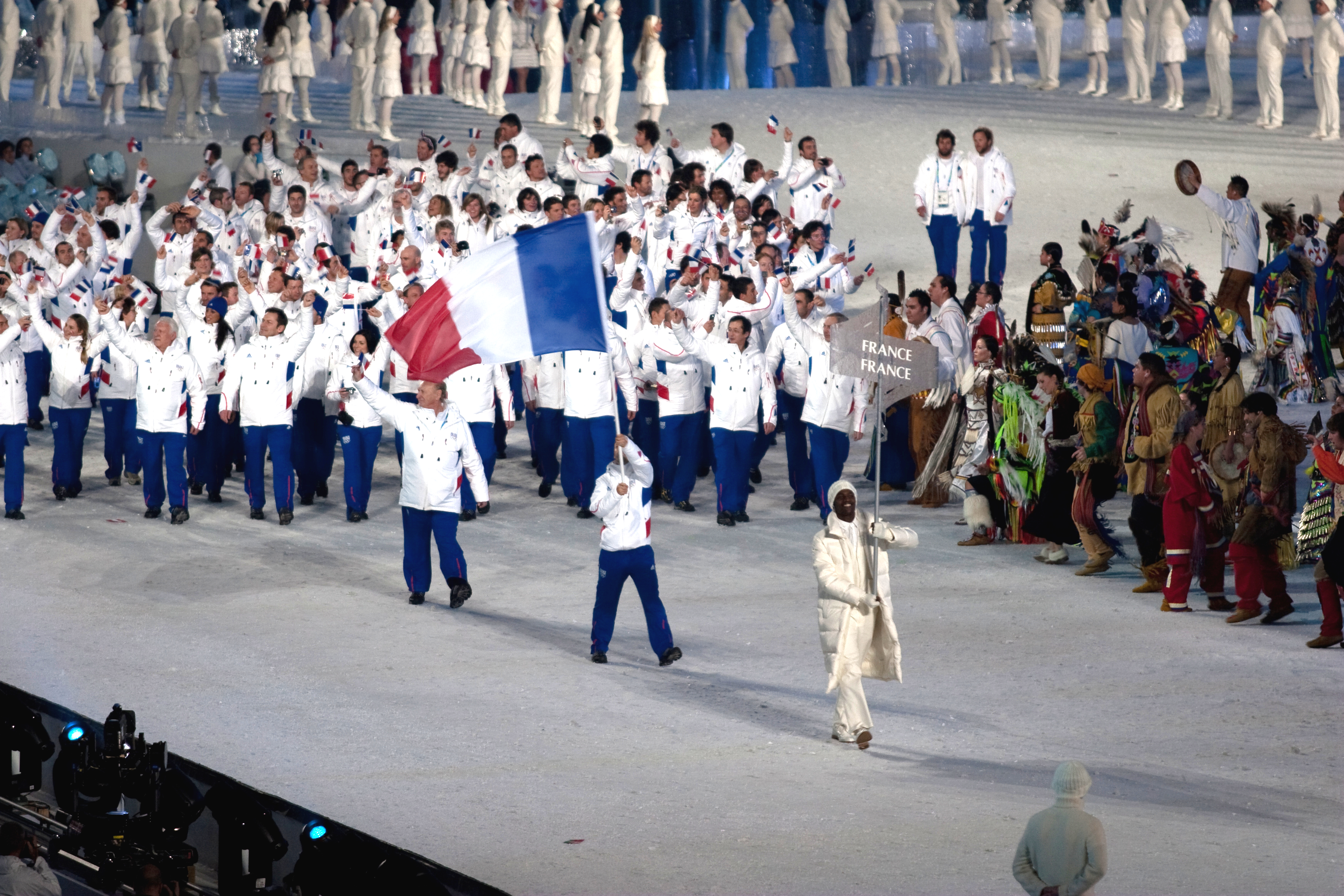
The athletes entering the stadium during the opening ceremonies.

France participated at the 2010 Winter Olympics in Vancouver, British Columbia, Canada. 108 French competitors competed, and 11 medals were won.

== Medalists ==
Medal	Name	Sport	Event
Gold	Vincent Jay	Biathlon	Men's sprint
Gold	Jason Lamy-Chappuis	Nordic combined	Individual normal hill/10 km
Gold	Martin Fourcade	Biathlon	Men's mass start
Silver	Déborah Anthonioz	Snowboarding	Women's snowboard cross
Silver	Marie-Laure Brunet; Sylvie Becaert; Marie Dorin; Sandrine Bailly	Biathlon	Women's relay
Bronze	Vincent Jay	Biathlon	Men's pursuit
Bronze	Marie Dorin	Biathlon	Women's sprint
Bronze	Marie-Laure Brunet	Biathlon	Women's pursuit
Bronze	Tony Ramoin	Snowboarding	Men's snowboard cross
Bronze	Marion Josserand	Freestyle skiing	Women's ski cross
Bronze	Mathieu Bozzetto	Snowboarding	Men's parallel giant slalom

== Alpine skiing ==
France qualified 22 skiers, most of any nation at the Games.

Men

Athlete	Event	Run 1	Run 2	Total	Rank
Johan Clarey	Men's combined	DNF			
Johan Clarey	Men's downhill			1:56.29	27
Guillermo Fayed	Men's downhill			1:56.20	26
Guillermo Fayed	Men's super-G			1:32.03	22
Julien Lizeroux	Men's combined	1:57.18	51.18	2:48.36	18
Julien Lizeroux	Men's slalom	48.82	51.90	1:40.72	9
Thomas Mermillod-Blondin	Men's combined	1:56.50	52.12	2:48.62	19
Thomas Mermillod-Blondin	Men's giant slalom	DNF			
Thomas Mermillod-Blondin	Men's slalom	49.90	52.58	1:42.48	21
Steve Missillier	Men's giant slalom	1:18.20	1:21.23	2:39.43	13
Steve Missillier	Men's slalom	49.49	DNS		
David Poisson	Men's downhill			1:54.82	7
David Poisson	Men's super-G			DNF	
Cyprien Richard	Men's giant slalom	1:17.86	DNF		
Gauthier de Tessières	Men's giant slalom	1:19.50	DNS		
Gauthier de Tessières	Men's super-G			1:33.17	31
Adrien Theaux	Men's combined	1:55.05	52.92	2:47.97	12
Adrien Theaux	Men's downhill			1:55.40	16
Adrien Theaux	Men's super-G			1:31.24	13
Maxime Tissot	Men's slalom	49.52	52.02	1:41.54	16

Women

Athlete	Event	Run 1	Run 2	Total	Rank
Sandrine Aubert	Women's combined	1:29.50	44.46	2:13.96	20
Sandrine Aubert	Women's slalom	51.68	52.78	1:44.46	5
Taïna Barioz	Women's giant slalom	1:15.14	1:12.65	2:27.79	9
Anne-Sophie Barthet	Women's slalom	53.82	54.01	1:47.83	26
Olivia Bertrand	Women's giant slalom	1:16.32	1:11.81	2:28.13	12
Claire Dautherives	Women's slalom	DNF			
Ingrid Jacquemod	Women's downhill			1:48.85	23
Ingrid Jacquemod	Women's super-G			1:21.77	10
Marie Marchand-Arvier	Women's combined	1:25.41	46.41	2:11.82	10
Marie Marchand-Arvier	Women's downhill			1:46.22	7
Marie Marchand-Arvier	Women's super-G			DNF	
Anemone Marmottan	Women's giant slalom	1:16.55	1:11.45	2:28.00	11
Nastasia Noens	Women's slalom	54.49	54.08	1:48.57	29
Aurélie Revillet	Women's downhill			1:47.92	17
Aurélie Revillet	Women's super-G			1:24.08	22
Marion Rolland	Women's downhill			DNF	
Tessa Worley	Women's giant slalom	1:15.80	1:12.74	2:28.54	16

== Biathlon ==
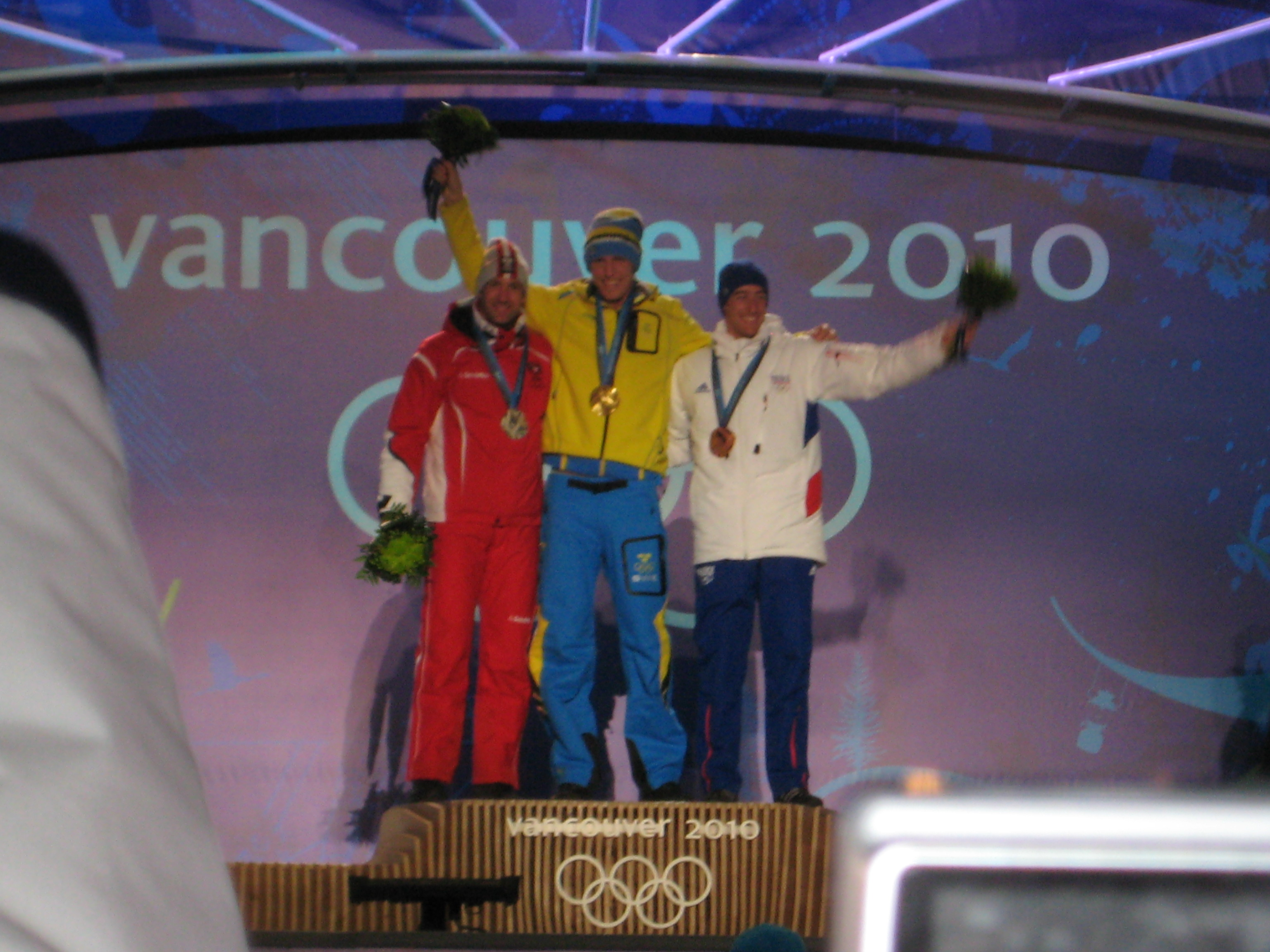
Vincent Jay (right) bronze medalist in the Men's pursuit.

Men

Athlete	Event	Final		
Athlete	Event	Time	Misses	Rank
Vincent Defrasne	Men's individual	52:14.9	0+1+2+0	26
Vincent Defrasne	Men's sprint	27:14.6	2+1	53
Vincent Defrasne	Men's pursuit	35:35.6	0+0+0+0	22
Martin Fourcade	Men's individual	50:55.4	1+0+2+0	14
Martin Fourcade	Men's sprint	26:25.6	3+0	35
Martin Fourcade	Men's pursuit	36:28.4	1+0+2+2	34
Martin Fourcade	Men's mass start	35:46.2	2+0+0+1	1st place, gold medalist(s)
Simon Fourcade	Men's individual	53:06.2	3+0+0+1	40
Simon Fourcade	Men's sprint	27:53.0	1+3	71
Simon Fourcade	Men's mass start	36:28.1	0+1+0+0	14
Vincent Jay	Men's individual	54:37.5	1+1+0+2	60
Vincent Jay	Men's sprint	24:07.8	0+0	1st place, gold medalist(s)
Vincent Jay	Men's pursuit	34:06.6	0+0+1+1	3rd place, bronze medalist(s)
Vincent Jay	Men's mass start	36:10.3	0+0+0+1	8
Vincent Jay; Martin Fourcade; Simon Fourcade; Vincent Defrasne	Men's relay	1:24:50.7	1+9	5

Women

Athlete	Event	Final		
Athlete	Event	Time	Misses	Rank
Sandrine Bailly	Women's individual	46:28.8	1+0+3+1	52
Sandrine Bailly	Women's sprint	20:45.3	2+1	15
Sandrine Bailly	Women's pursuit	33:15.0	1+0+1+2	27
Sandrine Bailly	Women's mass start	36:02.0	0+0+2+0	7
Marie-Laure Brunet	Women's individual	42:44.4	0+1+0+1	12
Marie-Laure Brunet	Women's sprint	20:23.3	0+0	6
Marie-Laure Brunet	Women's pursuit	30:44.3	0+0+0+0	3rd place, bronze medalist(s)
Marie-Laure Brunet	Women's mass start	36:39.5	0+0+1+2	15
Marie Dorin	Women's individual	46:17.7	2+1+0+1	51
Marie Dorin	Women's sprint	20:06.5	0+0	3rd place, bronze medalist(s)
Marie Dorin	Women's pursuit	32:03.2	0+1+0+1	17
Marie Dorin	Women's mass start	36:40.9	1+0+0+0	16
Sylvie Becaert	Women's individual	44:13.2	1+1+1+0	30
Sylvie Becaert	Women's sprint	21:21.6	1+1	29
Sylvie Becaert	Women's pursuit	33:34.8	1+0+2+0	29
Marie-Laure Brunet; Sylvie Becaert; Marie Dorin; Sandrine Bailly	Women's relay	1:10:09.1	2+8	2nd place, silver medalist(s)

== Cross-country skiing ==
Men

Athlete	Event	Qualification		Quarterfinals		Semifinals		Final	
Athlete	Event	Time	Rank	Time	Rank	Time	Rank	Time	Rank
Roddy Darragon	Sprint	3:41.88	31	did not qualify					31
Robin Duvillard	30 km pursuit							1:23:57.6	50
Jean-Marc Gaillard	15 km freestyle							35:20.5	32
Jean-Marc Gaillard	30 km pursuit							1:19:48.1	30
Jean-Marc Gaillard	50 km classic							2:06:38.0	19
Emmanuel Jonnier	15 km freestyle							34:55.1	20
Maurice Manificat	15 km freestyle							34:27.4	6
Maurice Manificat	30 km pursuit							1:17:58.2	26
Cyril Miranda	Sprint	3:38.83	17 Q	3:37.3	3	did not advance			
Cyril Miranda	50 km classic							2:11:56.9	38
Vincent Vittoz	15 km freestyle							34:16.2	5
Vincent Vittoz	30 km pursuit							1:16:23.4	15
Vincent Vittoz	50 km classic							2:05:49.6	13
Cyril Miranda, Vincent Vittoz	Team sprint					18:43.8	2	19:18.7	7
Jean-Marc Gaillard, Vincent Vittoz, Maurice Manificat, Emmanuel Jonnier	4 x 10 km relay							1:45:26.3	4

Women

Athlete	Event	Qualification		Quarterfinals		Semifinals		Final	
Athlete	Event	Time	Rank	Time	Rank	Time	Rank	Time	Rank
Laure Barthélémy	10 km freestyle							28:43.9	62
Celia Bourgeois	10 km freestyle							27:31.4	48
Aurore Cuinet	Sprint	3:48.52	23 Q	3:48.7	5	did not qualify			23
Aurore Cuinet	10 km freestyle							27:30.2	47
Aurore Cuinet	15 km pursuit							21:59.8	32
Aurore Cuinet	30 km classic							1:33:58.3	15
Karine Laurent Philippot	10 km freestyle							26:27.9	26
Karine Laurent Philippot	15 km pursuit							22:11.5	19
Karine Laurent Philippot	30 km classic							1:33:11.4	10
Cécile Storti	15 km pursuit							23:41.7	45
Cécile Storti	30 km classic							did not finish	
Emilie Vina	15 km pursuit							23:01.1	49
Karine Laurent Philippot, Laure Barthélémy	Team sprint					18:42.2	1 Q	19:04.2	10
Aurore Cuinet, Karine Laurent Philippot, Celia Bourgeois, Cécile Storti	4 x 5 km relay							56:30.6	6

== Curling ==
=== Men's tournament ===
Men's team

- Thomas Dufour
- Tony Angiboust
- Jan Ducroz
- Richard Ducroz
- Raphael Mathieu

Standings

Final round robin standings
Team	Skip	Pld	W	L	PF	PA	EW	EL	BE	SE	S%	Qualification
Canada	Kevin Martin	9	9	0	75	36	36	28	14	2	85%	Playoffs
Norway	Thomas Ulsrud	9	7	2	64	43	40	32	15	7	84%	Playoffs
Switzerland	Ralph Stöckli	9	6	3	53	44	35	33	20	8	81%	Playoffs
Sweden	Niklas Edin	9	5	4	50	52	34	36	20	6	82%	Tiebreaker
Great Britain	David Murdoch	9	5	4	57	44	35	29	20	9	81%	Tiebreaker
Germany	Andy Kapp	9	4	5	48	60	35	38	11	9	75%	
France	Thomas Dufour	9	3	6	37	63	22	34	16	7	73%	
China	Wang Fengchun	9	2	7	52	60	37	37	9	7	77%	
Denmark	Ulrik Schmidt	9	2	7	45	63	31	29	12	6	78%	
United States	John Shuster	9	2	7	43	59	32	41	18	9	76%	

== Figure skating ==
Athlete(s)	Event	CD		SP/OD		FS/FD		Total	
Athlete(s)	Event	Points	Rank	Points	Rank	Points	Rank	Points	Rank
Florent Amodio	Men			75.35	11	134.95	15	210.30	12
Brian Joubert	Men			68.00	18	132.22	16	200.22	16
Vanessa James / Yannick Bonheur	Pairs			51.16	15	93.94	14	145.10	14
Isabelle Delobel / Olivier Schoenfelder	Ice dancing	37.99	6	58.68	7	97.06	6	193.73	6
Nathalie Péchalat / Fabian Bourzat	Ice dancing	36.13	9	59.99	6	94.37	7	190.49	7

== Freestyle skiing ==
Moguls

Athlete	Event	Qualifying		Final	
Athlete	Event	Points	Rank	Points	Rank
Guilbaut Colas	Men's moguls	25.93	1 Q	25.74	6
Anthony Benna	Men's moguls	RNS'		DNQ'	
Arnaud Burille	Men's moguls	22.58	22	DNQ	22
Pierre Ochs	Men's moguls	23.19	17 Q	23.62	12

Ski cross

Athlete	Event	Qualifying		1/8 finals	Quarterfinals	Semifinals	Finals	
Athlete	Event	Time	Rank	Position	Position	Position	Position	Rank
Enak Gavaggio	Men's ski cross	1:13.90	1 Q	1 Q	2 Q	4	Small Final; 1	5
Xavier Kuhn	Men's ski cross	1:12.91	3 Q	4	DNQ			29
Ted Piccard	Men's ski cross	1:14.10	16 Q	4	DNQ			30
Sylvain Miaillier	Men's ski cross	1:13.91	14 Q	1 Q	3	DNQ		11
Ophélie David	Women's ski cross	1:18.14	6 Q	1 Q	4	DNQ		16
Chloe Georges	Women's ski cross	1:22.03	28 Q	4	DNQ			25
Marion Josserand	Women's ski cross	1:19.42	13 Q	2 Q	2 Q	1 Q	3	3rd place, bronze medalist(s)

== Luge ==
Athlete(s)	Event	Run 1	Run 2	Run 3	Run 4	Total	
Athlete(s)	Event	Time	Time	Time	Time	Time	Rank
Thomas Girod	Men's	49.077	49.192	49.294	49.157	3:16.850	22

== Nordic combined ==
Athlete	Event	Ski jumping		Cross-country		Final	
Athlete	Event	Points	Rank	Deficit	Ski Time	Total Time	Rank
Jason Lamy-Chappuis	Normal hill/10 km	124.0	5	0:46	25:01.1	25:47.1	1st place, gold medalist(s)
Jason Lamy-Chappuis	Large hill/10 km	91.5	29	2:22	25:22.6	27:34.1	18
François Braud	Normal hill/10 km	122.0	8	0:54	26:58.3	27:52.3	34
François Braud	Large hill/10 km	116.3	5	0:43	26:16.6	26:59.6	14
Maxime Laheurte	Large hill/10 km	80.0	39	3:08	26:24.2	29:33.0	38
Jonathan Felisaz	Normal hill/10 km	112.0	30	1:34	26:03.7	27:37.7	30
Sébastien Lacroix	Normal hill/10 km	113.0	29	1:30	25:26.3	26:56:3	19
Sébastien Lacroix	Large hill/10 km	101.2	21	1:43	26:02.2	26:45.2	19
France; Maxime Laheurte; François Braud; Sébastien Lacroix; Jason Lamy-Chappuis	Team large hill/4 x 5 km	474.7	5	0:43	48:35.4	49:28.4	4

== Short track speed skating ==
Men

Athlete	Event	Heat		Quarterfinal		Semifinal		Final	
Athlete	Event	Time	Rank	Time	Rank	Time	Rank	Time	Rank
Maxime Chataignier	1000 m	DQ		did not advance					T34
Maxime Chataignier	1500 m	DQ		did not advance					T34
Thibaut Fauconnet	500 m	41.730	1 Q	51.339	4	did not advance			16
Thibaut Fauconnet	1000 m	1:27.080	2 Q	1:26.213	4	did not advance			15
Benjamin Macé	1500 m	2:12.875	4	did not advance					
Jean Charles Mattei	1500 m	2:33.989	5 ADV	2:36.291	7	did not advance			21
Jean Charles Mattei; Benjamin Macé; Thibaut Fauconnet; Maxime Chataignier; Jeremy Masson	5000 m relay					6:51.071	3 ADV	6:51.566	5

Women

Athlete	Event	Heat		Quarterfinal		Semifinal		Final	
Athlete	Event	Time	Rank	Time	Rank	Time	Rank	Time	Rank
Stéphanie Bouvier	500 m	44.376	3	did not advance					
Stéphanie Bouvier	1000 m	1:36.199	2 Q	1:30.420	4	did not advance			9
Stéphanie Bouvier	1500 m	2:24.966	4 Q	did not advance					
Veronique Pierron	500 m	45.218	2	1:10.899	4	did not advance			

== Skeleton ==
Men

Athlete(s)	Event	Run 1		Run 2		Run 3		Run 4		Total	
Athlete(s)	Event	Time	Rank	Time	Rank	Time	Rank	Time	Rank	Time	Rank
Gregory Saint Genies	Men's	53.40	15	53.16	8	53.32	16	53.43	20	3:33.31	15

== Ski jumping ==
Men

Athlete	Event	Qualifying		First round		Final		
Athlete	Event	Points	Rank	Points	Rank	Points	Total	Rank
Emmanuel Chedal	Normal hill	127.0	13	120.0	24	114.5	27	24
Emmanuel Chedal	Large hill	135.1	10	99.8	25	125.7	7	13
Vincent Descombes Sevoie	Normal hill	123.5	18	113.5	29	116.5	24	28
Vincent Descombes Sevoie	Large hill	117.9	26	101.0	23	110.6	19	21
David Lazzaroni	Normal hill	117.9	26	101.0	47	DNQ		47
David Lazzaroni	Large hill	105.0	35	85.6	34	DNQ		34
Alexandre Mabboux	Normal hill	103.0	50	DNQ				60
Alexandre Mabboux	Large hill	76.1	48	DNQ				58
Emmanuel Chedal; Vincent Descombes Sevoie; David Lazzaroni; Alexandre Mabboux	Team			419.8	9	DNQ		9

== Snowboarding ==
- Déborah Anthonioz
- Mathieu Bozzetto
- Mathieu Crepel
- Paul-Henri de Le Rue
- Camile De Foucompre
- Xavier de Le Rue
- Natalie Desmares
- Sylvain Dufour
- Nelly Moenne Loccoz
- Tony Ramoin
- Claire Chapotot
- Pierre Vaultier

Halfpipe

Athlete	Event	Qualifying			Semifinal			Final		
Athlete	Event	Run 1	Run 2	Rank	Run 1	Run 2	Rank	Run 1	Run 2	Rank
Mathieu Crépel	Men's halfpipe	32.6	2.5	6 QS	37.2	22.6	4 QF	16.7	18.6	10
Arthur Longo	Men's halfpipe	34.5	32.4	10	did not advance					
Aluan Ricciardi	Men's halfpipe	25.4	37.9	4	33.2	12.8	9	did not advance		
Gary Zebrowski	Men's halfpipe	31.6	18.7	8	20.1	36.1	7	did not advance		
Sophie Rodriguez	Women's halfpipe	30.1	34.5	11 QS	36.9	9.5	5 QF	34.4	8.3	5
Mirabelle Thovex	Women's halfpipe	14.6	24.0	20	did not advance					

== Speed skating ==
Men

Athlete	Event	Final	
Athlete	Event	Time	Rank
Pascal Briand	1500 m	1:50.71	33
Alexis Contin	5000 m	6:19.58	6
Alexis Contin	10000 m	13:12.11	4

== See also ==
- France at the 2010 Winter Paralympics
