= Mabboux =

Mabboux is a French surname. Notable people with the surname include:

- Alexandre Mabboux (born 1991), French ski jumper
- André Mabboux (1923–2011), French curler
