= Alpine skiing at the 2010 Winter Olympics – Women's super-G =

Women's super-G at the XXI Olympic Winter Games
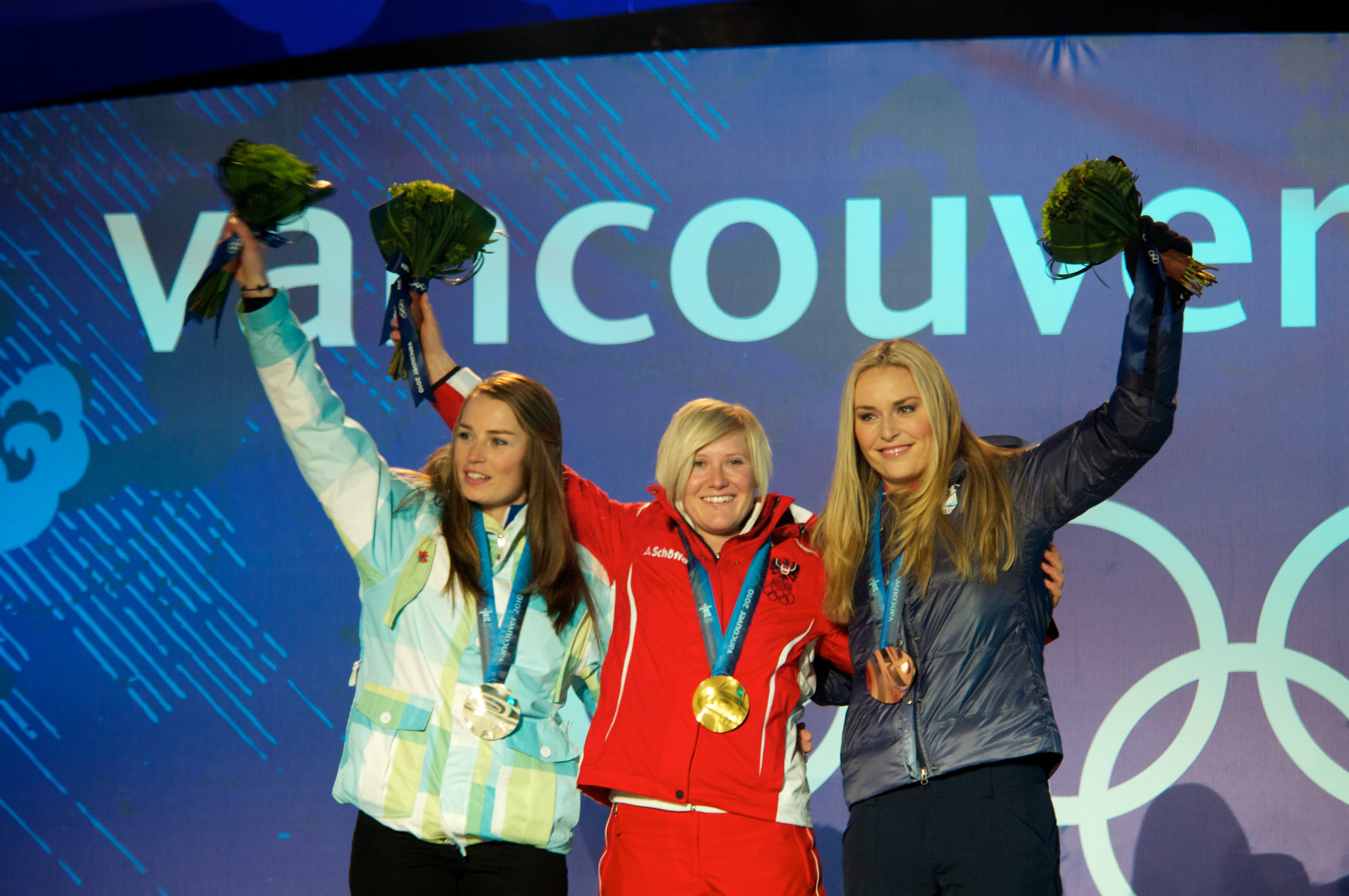
- Medalists: Maze, Fischbacher, Vonn
- Venue: Whistler Creekside
- Date: February 20, 2010
- Competitors: 53 from 27 nations
- Winning time: 1:20.14

Medalists
1st place, gold medalist(s)		Andrea Fischbacher	Austria
2nd place, silver medalist(s)		Tina Maze	Slovenia
3rd place, bronze medalist(s)		Lindsey Vonn	United States

Women's super-G
- Interactive map of Women's super-G
- Location: Whistler Creekside; Franz's Super-G
- Vertical: 600 m (1,969 ft)
- Top elevation: 1,425 m (4,675 ft)
- Base elevation: 825 m (2,707 ft)

The women's super-G competition of the Vancouver 2010 Olympics was held at Whistler Creekside in Whistler, British Columbia, on Saturday, February 20.

Andrea Fischbacher of Austria won the gold medal, Tina Maze of Slovenia took the silver, and the bronze medalist was Lindsey Vonn of the United States, who had won gold in the downhill.

The Franz's Super-G course started at an elevation of 1,425 m (4,675 ft) above sea level with a vertical drop of 600 m (1,969 ft) and a length of 2.005 km (1.25 mi). Fischbacher's winning time of 80.14 seconds yielded an average course speed of 90.067 km/h (56.0 mph), with an average vertical descent rate of 7.487 m/s (24.6 ft/s).

== Results ==
Saturday, February 20, 2010

The race was started at 10:00 local time, (UTC −8). At the starting gate, the skies were clear, the temperature was 2.8 °C (37 °F), and the snow condition was hard packed. The temperature at the finish was 5.9 °C (43 °F).

Rank	Bib	Name	Country	Time	Difference
1st place, gold medalist(s)	19	Andrea Fischbacher	Austria	1:20.14	—
2nd place, silver medalist(s)	22	Tina Maze	Slovenia	1:20.63	+0.49
3rd place, bronze medalist(s)	17	Lindsey Vonn	United States	1:20.88	+0.74
4	30	Johanna Schnarf	Italy	1:20.99	+0.85
5	16	Elisabeth Görgl	Austria	1:21.14	+1.00
6	20	Nadia Styger	Switzerland	1:21.25	+1.11
7	26	Lucia Recchia	Italy	1:21.43	+1.29
8	12	Maria Riesch	Germany	1:21.46	+1.32
9	1	Julia Mancuso	United States	1:21.50	+1.36
10	14	Ingrid Jacquemod	France	1:21.77	+1.63
11	21	Anja Pärson	Sweden	1:21.98	+1.84
12	13	Andrea Dettling	Switzerland	1:22.03	+1.89
13	18	Fabienne Suter	Switzerland	1:22.16	+2.02
14	28	Elena Fanchini	Italy	1:22.17	+2.03
15	6	Gina Stechert	Germany	1:22.21	+2.07
16	15	Anna Fenninger	Austria	1:22.30	+2.16
17	25	Britt Janyk	Canada	1:22.89	+2.75
18	4	Carolina Ruiz Castillo	Spain	1:23.05	+2.91
18	23	Leanne Smith	United States	1:23.05	+2.91
20	2	Chemmy Alcott	Great Britain	1:23.46	+3.32
21	34	Mona Løseth	Norway	1:23.97	+3.83
22	33	Aurelie Revillet	France	1:24.08	+3.94
23	35	Agnieszka Gąsienica-Daniel	Poland	1:24.31	+4.17
24	31	Elena Prosteva	Russia	1:24.43	+4.29
25	32	Alexandra Coletti	Monaco	1:24.56	+4.42
26	8	Jessica Lindell-Vikarby	Sweden	1:24.83	+4.69
27	36	Georgia Simmerling	Canada	1:25.21	+5.07
28	3	Viktoria Rebensburg	Germany	1:25.23	+5.09
29	38	Klára Křížová	Czech Republic	1:26.46	+6.32
30	41	Jelena Lolović	Serbia	1:26.67	+6.53
31	47	María Belén Simari Birkner	Argentina	1:27.24	+7.10
32	42	Macarena Simari Birkner	Argentina	1:27.48	+7.34
33	43	Maria Shkanova	Belarus	1:27.84	+7.70
34	49	Anastasiya Skryabina	Ukraine	1:28.60	+8.46
35	52	Noelle Barahona	Chile	1:28.66	+8.52
36	50	Zsófia Döme	Hungary	1:29.09	+8.95
37	51	Chirine Njeim	Lebanon	1:29.59	+9.45
38	53	Lyudmila Fedotova	Kazakhstan	1:31.43	+11.29
	5	Nicole Schmidhofer	Austria	DNF	
	7	Maruša Ferk	Slovenia	DNF	
	9	Emily Brydon	Canada	DNF	
	10	Nadja Kamer	Switzerland	DNF	
	11	Marie Marchand-Arvier	France	DNF	
	24	Shona Rubens	Canada	DNF	
	27	Chelsea Marshall	United States	DNF	
	29	Daniela Merighetti	Italy	DNF	
	37	Lyaysan Rayanova	Russia	DNF	
	39	Nevena Ignjatović	Serbia	DNF	
	40	Mireia Gutierrez	Andorra	DNF	
	44	Andrea Jardi	Spain	DNF	
	45	Íris Guðmundsdóttir	Iceland	DNF	
	46	Anna Berecz	Hungary	DNF	
	48	Maria Kirkova	Bulgaria	DNF	
