= Slovenia at the 2010 Winter Olympics =

- IOC code: SLO
- NOC: Olympic Committee of Slovenia
- Website: www.olympic.si (in Slovene and English)

in Vancouver
- Competitors: 47 in 10 sports
- Flag bearer: Tina Maze
- Medals Ranked 21st: Gold 0 Silver 2 Bronze 1 Total 3

Winter Olympics appearances (overview)
- 1992; 1994; 1998; 2002; 2006; 2010; 2014; 2018; 2022; 2026

Other related appearances
- Yugoslavia (1924–1988)

Slovenia participated at the 2010 Winter Olympics in Vancouver, British Columbia, Canada. Alpine skier Tina Maze won two silver medals, and cross-country skier Petra Majdič won bronze in the women's sprint event, despite having crashed into a pit during warm-up, suffering four broken ribs and a punctured lung.

Among other notable results were Robert Kranjec's 6th place in normal hill and 9th place in large hill ski jumping event, Tina Maze's 9th place in slalom, and Aleš Gorza's 10th place in giant slalom.

== Medalists ==
| Medal | Name | Sport | Event |
|---|---|---|---|
| Silver | Tina Maze | Alpine skiing | Women's super-G |
| Silver | Tina Maze | Alpine skiing | Women's giant slalom |
| Bronze | Petra Majdič | Cross-country skiing | Women's individual classic sprint |

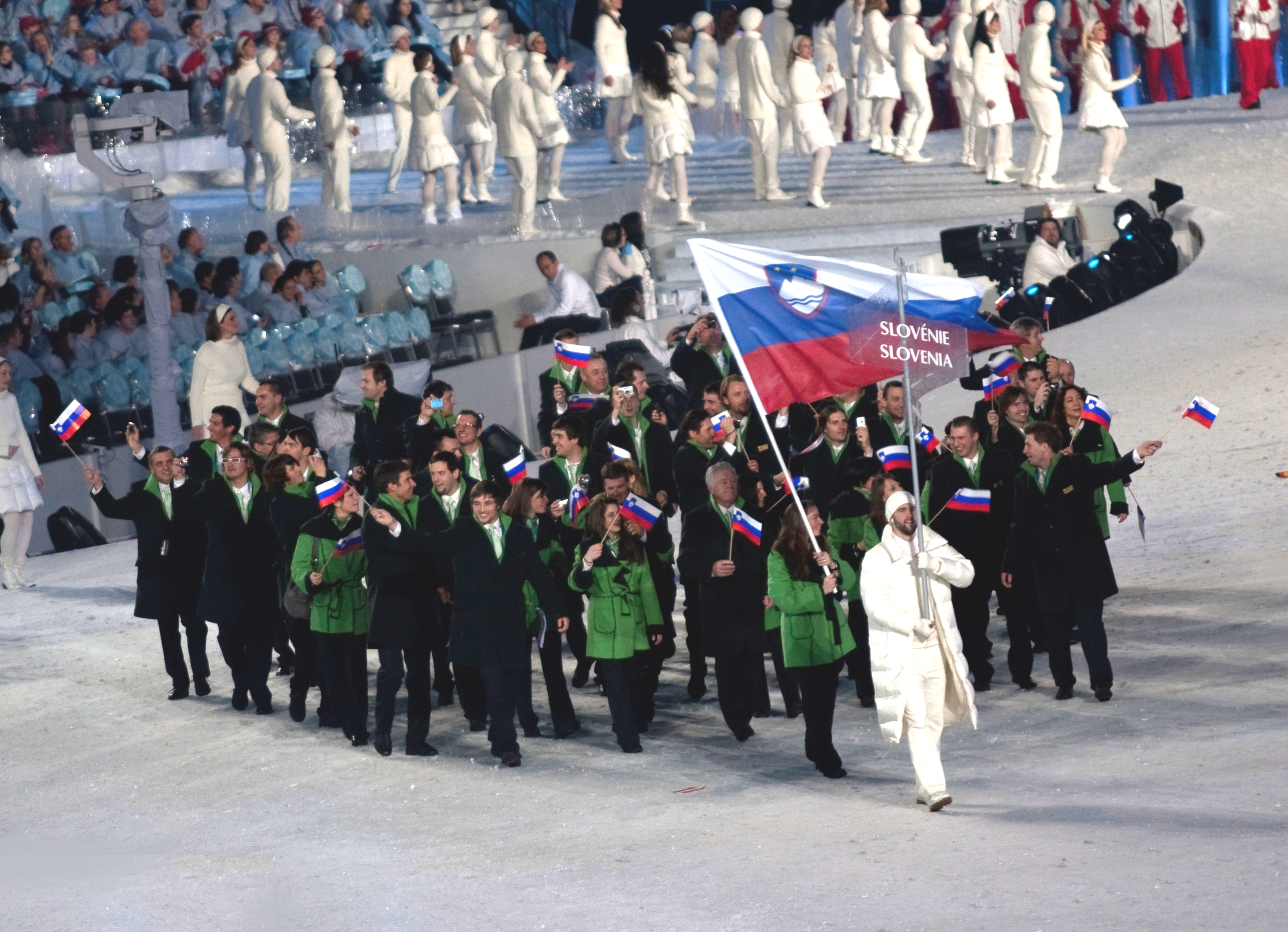
Slovenia at the opening ceremony

== Alpine skiing ==
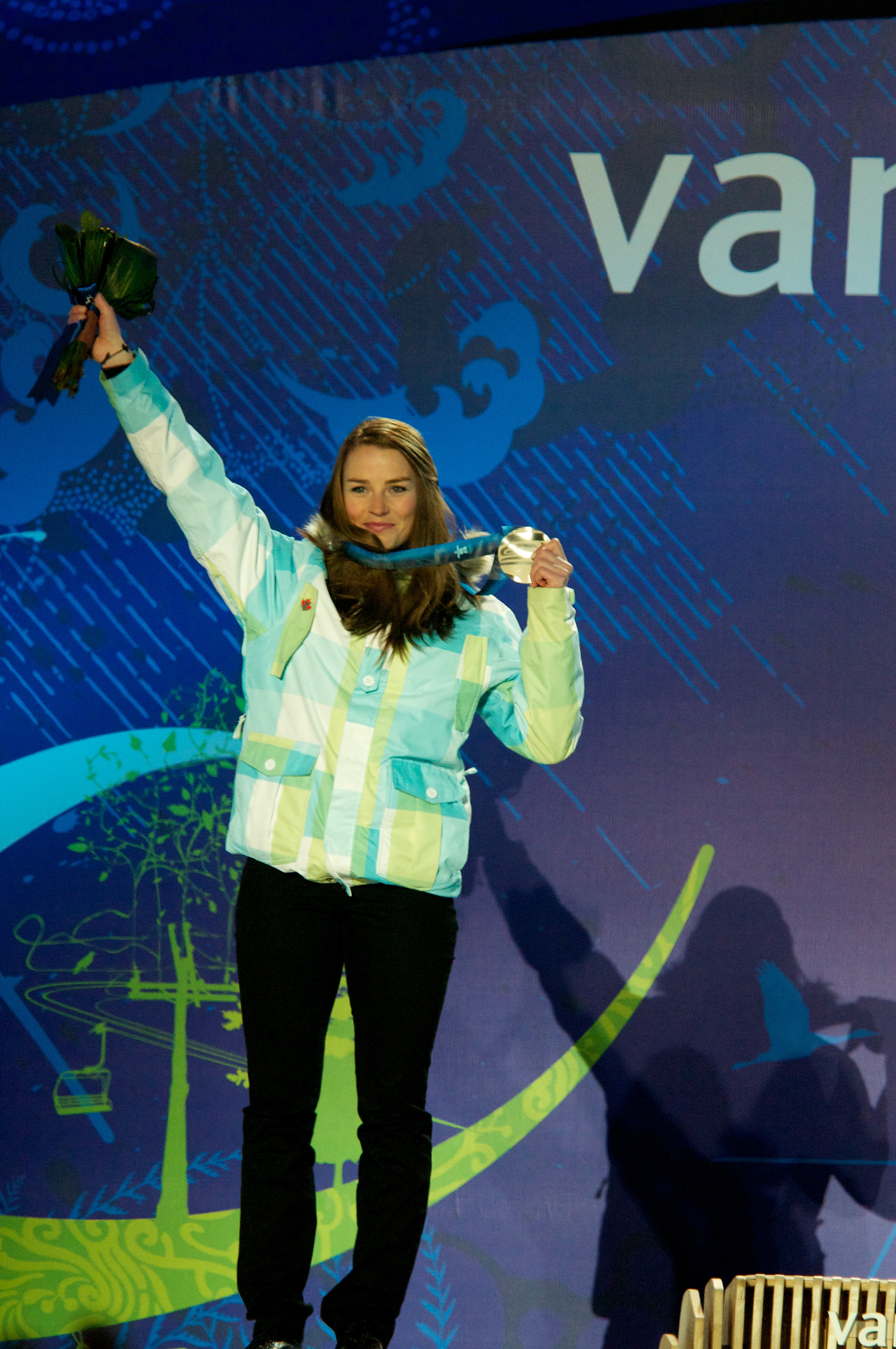
Tina Maze with one of the silver medals she won.

Men

| Athlete | Event | Run 1 | Run 2 | Total | Rank |
|---|---|---|---|---|---|
| Mitja Dragšič | Men's slalom | DNF | | | |
| Aleš Gorza | Men's giant slalom | 1:17.95 | 1:21.26 | 2:39.21 | 10 |
| Aleš Gorza | Men's super-G | | | 1:31.07 | 11 |
| Janez Jazbec | Men's giant slalom | 1:18.92 | 1:21.04 | 2:39.96 | 19 |
| Andrej Jerman | Men's combined | 1:56.03 | 54.81 | 2:50.84 | 27 |
| Andrej Jerman | Men's downhill | | | DNF | |
| Andrej Jerman | Men's super-G | | | 1:56.35 | 28 |
| Andrej Križaj | Men's combined | 1:56.48 | DNF | | |
| Andrej Križaj | Men's downhill | | | 1:57.72 | 37 |
| Andrej Križaj | Men's giant slalom | 1:20.48 | 1:23.74 | 2:44.22 | 33 |
| Andrej Križaj | Men's super-G | | | DSQ | |
| Rok Perko | Men's downhill | | | 1:55.26 | 14 |
| Matic Skube | Men's slalom | DNF | | | |
| Andrej Šporn | Men's combined | 1:54.56 | DNF | | |
| Andrej Šporn | Men's downhill | | | DNF | |
| Andrej Šporn | Men's giant slalom | 1:19.19 | 1:21.86 | 2:41.05 | 25 |
| Andrej Šporn | Men's super-G | | | 1:31.58 | 18 |
| Bernard Vajdič | Men's slalom | DNF | | | |
| Mitja Valenčič | Men's slalom | 48.22 | 52.13 | 1:40.35 | 6 |

Women

| Athlete | Event | Run 1 | Run 2 | Total | Rank |
|---|---|---|---|---|---|
| Ana Drev | Women's slalom | DNF | | | |
| Ana Drev | Women's giant slalom | 1:17.63 | 1:11.20 | 2:28.83 | 19 |
| Maruša Ferk | Women's slalom | 53.20 | 52.83 | 1:47.03 | 23 |
| Maruša Ferk | Women's super-G | | | DNF | |
| Maruša Ferk | Women's downhill | | | 1:48.24 | 20 |
| Maruša Ferk | Women's combined | 1:26.15 | 46.83 | 2:12.98 | 15 |
| Tina Maze | Women's slalom | 52.28 | 52.81 | 1:45.09 | 9 |
| Tina Maze | Women's super-G | | | 1:20.63 | 2nd place, silver medalist(s) |
| Tina Maze | Women's downhill | | | 1:47.94 | 18 |
| Tina Maze | Women's combined | 1:25.97 | 44.56 | 2:10.53 | 5 |
| Tina Maze | Women's giant slalom | 1:15.39 | 1:11.76 | 2:27.15 | 2nd place, silver medalist(s) |

== Biathlon ==
Men

| Athlete | Event | Final | | |
| Athlete | Event | Time | Misses | Rank |
|---|---|---|---|---|
| Klemen Bauer | Sprint | 24:25.2 | 1 (0+1) | 4 |
| Klemen Bauer | Pursuit | 34:33.8 | 5 (1+0+2+2) | 9 |
| Klemen Bauer | Mass start | 38:16.9 | 5 (2+0+0+3) | 28 |
| Klemen Bauer | Individual | 52:43.9 | 3 (0+2+0+1) | 32 |
| Vasja Rupnik | Sprint | 27:20.8 | 3 (0+3) | 57 |
| Vasja Rupnik | Pursuit | 41:59.2 | 11 (1+2+4+4) | 59 |
| Vasja Rupnik | Individual | 53:49.8 | 4 (1+1+1+1) | 49 |
| Janez Marič | Sprint | 26:12.5 | 2 (1+1) | 27 |
| Janez Marič | Pursuit | 37:28.4 | 5 (0+1+3+1) | 47 |
| Janez Marič | Individual | 54:46.4 | 5 (1+2+1+1) | 62 |
| Peter Dokl | Sprint | 27:21.0 | 0 (0+0) | 58 |
| Peter Dokl | Pursuit | LAP | 5 (0+3+2+ ) | DNF |
| Peter Dokl | Individual | 56:41.9 | 2 (2+0+0+0) | 75 |

Men's relay

| Athlete | Event | Final | | |
| Athlete | Event | Time | Misses | Rank |
|---|---|---|---|---|
| Peter Dokl; Klemen Bauer; Vasja Rupnik; Janez Marič | 4 x 7.5 km relay | 1:29:52.4 | 19 (3+16) | 16 |

Women

| Athlete | Event | Final | | |
| Athlete | Event | Time | Misses | Rank |
|---|---|---|---|---|
| Andreja Mali | Sprint | 21:32.6 | 0 (0+0) | 31 |
| Andreja Mali | Pursuit | 33:53.9 | 2 (1+0+1+0) | 33 |
| Andreja Mali | Individual | 43:14.4 | 0 (0+0+0+0) | 19 |
| Andreja Mali | Mass start | 38:53.9 | 4 (0+2+0+2) | 26 |
| Dijana Ravnikar | Sprint | 21:49.7 | 1 (0+1) | 37 |
| Dijana Ravnikar | Pursuit | 34:02.7 | 1 (0+0+0+1) | 39 |
| Dijana Ravnikar | Individual | 44:27.4 | 2 (1+0+0+1) | 35 |
| Teja Gregorin | Sprint | 20:29.2 | 0 (0+0) | 9 |
| Teja Gregorin | Pursuit | 31:38.6 | 2 (0+0+1+1) | 9 |
| Teja Gregorin | Individual | 44:29.1 | 3 (0+1+0+2) | 36 |
| Teja Gregorin | Mass start | 35:49.0 | 1 (0+0+0+1) | 5 |
| Tadeja Brankovič-Likozar | Sprint | 23:13.3 | 4 (1+3) | 75 |
| Tadeja Brankovič-Likozar | Individual | 47:09.5 | 4 (1+1+2+0) | 63 |

Women's relay

| Athlete | Event | Final | | |
| Athlete | Event | Time | Misses | Rank |
|---|---|---|---|---|
| Dijana Ravnikar; Andreja Mali; Tadeja Brankovič-Likozar; Teja Gregorin | 4 x 6 km relay | 1:12:02.4 | 6 (0+6) | 8 |

== Cross-country skiing ==
- Vesna Fabjan
- Barbara Jezeršek
- Katja Višnar

| Athlete | Event | Qualification | | Quarterfinals | | Semifinals | | Final | |
| Athlete | Event | Time | Rank | Time | Rank | Time | Rank | Time | Rank |
|---|---|---|---|---|---|---|---|---|---|
| Anja Eržen | 15 km pursuit | | | | | | | 48:22.9 | 60 |
| Vesna Fabjan | 10 km freestyle | | | | | | | 26:51.6 | 33 |
| Barbara Jezeršek | 10 km freestyle | | | | | | | 27:17.3 | 41 |
| Barbara Jezeršek | 15 km pursuit | | | | | | | 42:17.0 | 17 |
| Petra Majdič | Sprint | 3:47.84 | 19 Q | 3:40.2 | 1 Q | 3:41.2 | 4 LL | 3:41.0 | 3rd place, bronze medalist(s) |
| Katja Visnar, Vesna Fabjan | Team sprint | | | | | 18:58.9 | 4 LL | Did not advance | |
| Anja Erzen, Katja Višnar, Vesna Fabjan, Barbara Jezeršek | 4 x 5 km relay | | | | | | | 59:47.5 | 14 |

== Figure skating ==
| Athlete(s) | Event | CD | | SP/OD | | FS/FD | | Total | |
| Athlete(s) | Event | Points | Rank | Points | Rank | Points | Rank | Points | Rank |
|---|---|---|---|---|---|---|---|---|---|
| Gregor Urbas | Men | | | 53.02 | 27 | DNQ | | 53.02 | 27 |
| Teodora Poštič | Ladies' | | | 43.80 | 27 | DNQ | | 43.80 | 27 |

== Freestyle skiing ==
| Athlete | Event | Qualifying | | 1/8 finals | Quarterfinals | Semifinals | Finals | |
| Athlete | Event | Time | Rank | Position | Position | Position | Position | Rank |
|---|---|---|---|---|---|---|---|---|
| Filip Flisar | Men's ski cross | 1:13.46 | 7 Q | 1 Q | 2 Q | 4 | Small final 4 | 8 |
| Sasa Faric | Women's ski cross | 1:20.01 | 16 Q | 2 Q | 4 | DNQ | | 20 |

== Luge ==
| Athlete(s) | Event | Run 1 | Run 2 | Run 3 | Run 4 | Total | |
| Athlete(s) | Event | Time | Time | Time | Time | Time | Rank |
|---|---|---|---|---|---|---|---|
| Domen Pociecha | Men's | 49.340 | 49.457 | 49.587 | 49.362 | 3:17.746 | 27 |

== Nordic combined ==
| Athlete | Event | Ski jumping | | Cross-country | | |
| Athlete | Event | Points | Rank | Deficit | Time | Rank |
|---|---|---|---|---|---|---|
| Gašper Berlot | Large hill/10 km | 119.5 | 13 | 1:04 | 27:15.5 | 37 |
| Gašper Berlot | Normal hill/10 km | 89.2 | 32 | 2:31 | 26:57.9 | 37 |
| Mitja Oranič | Large hill/10 km | 108.0 | 36 | 1:50 | 1:51.2 | 31 |
| Mitja Oranič | Normal hill/10 km | 88.5 | 33 | 2:41 | 27:42.1 | 41 |

== Skeleton ==
| Athlete | Event | Run 1 | Run 2 | Run 3 | Run 4 | Total | Rank |
|---|---|---|---|---|---|---|---|
| Anže Šetina | Men's | 54.50 | 54.35 | 53.75 | Did not advance | 2:42.60 | 21 |

== Ski jumping ==
| Athlete | Event | Qualifying | | First round | | Final | | |
| Athlete | Event | Points | Rank | Points | Rank | Points | Total | Rank |
|---|---|---|---|---|---|---|---|---|
| Jernej Damjan | Normal hill | 126.5 | 15 Q | 108.0 | 38 Q | DNQ | | |
| Jernej Damjan | Large hill | 121.1 | 23 Q | 89.7 | 33 | DNQ | | |
| Robert Kranjec | Normal hill | 0.0 | PQ | 129.0 | 6 Q | 130.5 | 259.5 | 6 |
| Robert Kranjec | Large hill | 0.0 | PQ | 99.3 | 27 Q | 134.4 | 233.7 | 9 |
| Peter Prevc | Normal hill | 127.0 | 13 Q | 124.0 | 13 Q | 135.0 | 259.0 | 7 |
| Peter Prevc | Large hill | 122.1 | 21 Q | 111.6 | 14 Q | 110.7 | 222.3 | 16 |
| Primož Pikl | Normal hill | 116.5 | 27 Q | 117.5 | 25 Q | 117.0 | 234.5 | 24 |
| Mitja Mežnar | Large hill | 101.0 | 39 Q | 99.7 | 26 Q | 98.8 | 198.5 | 29 |
| Robert Kranjec; Mitja Mežnar; Primoz Pikl; Peter Prevc | Team | | | 472.2 | 8 Q | 486.6 | 958.8 | 8 |

== Snowboarding ==
Halfpipe

| Athlete | Event | Qualifying | | | Semifinal | | | Final | | |
| Athlete | Event | Run 1 | Run 2 | Rank | Run 1 | Run 2 | Rank | Run 1 | Run 2 | Rank |
|---|---|---|---|---|---|---|---|---|---|---|
| Cilka Sadar | Women's halfpipe | 18.2 | 26.8 | 18 QS | 21.5 | 30.1 | 11 | Did not advance | | 17 |

Parallel GS

| Athlete | Event | Qualification | | Round of 16 | Quarterfinals | Semifinals | Finals | |
| Athlete | Event | Time | Rank | Opposition time | Opposition time | Opposition time | Opposition time | Rank |
|---|---|---|---|---|---|---|---|---|
| Rok Flander | Men's parallel giant slalom | 1:18.64 | 15 Q | Sylvain Dufour (FRA) (2); W −1.65 | Jasey-Jay Anderson (CAN) (15); L +7.02 | Did not advance | | 8 |
| Zan Kosir | Men's parallel giant slalom | 1:18.31 | 12 Q | Matthew Morison (CAN) (5); W DSQ | Benjamin Karl (AUT) (4); L DSQ | Did not advance | | 6 |
| Rok Marguč | Men's parallel giant slalom | 1:21.09 | 23 | Did not advance | | | | 23 |
| Izidor Sustersic | Men's parallel giant slalom | 1:22.01 | 25 | Did not advance | | | | 25 |
| Glorija Kotnik | Women's parallel giant slalom | 1:32.11 | 27 | Did not advance | | | | 27 |

Snowboard cross

| Athlete | Event | Qualifying | | 1/8 finals | Quarterfinals | Semifinals | Finals | |
| Athlete | Event | Time | Rank | Position | Position | Position | Position | Rank |
|---|---|---|---|---|---|---|---|---|
| Rok Rogelj | Men's snowboard cross | 1:23.37 | 22 Q | 4 | Did not advance | | | 29 |
