= Anastasiya Skryabina =

Ukrainian alpine skier (born 1985)

Anastasiya Skryabina (born 10 May 1985) is an alpine skier from Ukraine. She competed for Ukraine at the 2010 Winter Olympics. Her best result was a 34th in the super-G.
