= Biathlon at the 2010 Winter Olympics – Men's sprint =

Men's sprint at the XXI Olympic Winter Games
- Pictogram for biathlon
- Venue: Whistler Olympic Park
- Date: February 14, 2010
- Competitors: 88 from 32 nations
- Winning time: 24:07.8

Medalists
1st place, gold medalist(s)		Vincent Jay	France
2nd place, silver medalist(s)		Emil Hegle Svendsen	Norway
3rd place, bronze medalist(s)		Jakov Fak	Croatia

The men's sprint competition of the Vancouver 2010 Olympics was held at Whistler Olympic Park in Whistler, British Columbia on February 14, 2010.

== Results ==
Rank	Bib	Name	Country	Time	Penalties (P+S)	Deficit
1st place, gold medalist(s)	6	Vincent Jay	France	24:07.8	0 (0+0)	
2nd place, silver medalist(s)	10	Emil Hegle Svendsen	Norway	24:20.0	1 (1+0)	+12.2
3rd place, bronze medalist(s)	4	Jakov Fak	Croatia	24:21.8	0 (0+0)	+14.0
4	2	Klemen Bauer	Slovenia	24:25.2	1 (0+1)	+17.4
5	9	Andriy Deryzemlya	Ukraine	24:48.5	2 (2+0)	+40.7
6	8	Jean-Philippe Leguellec	Canada	24:57.6	1 (0+1)	+49.8
7	14	Pavol Hurajt	Slovakia	25:15.0	1 (0+1)	+1:07.2
8	26	Björn Ferry	Sweden	25:20.0	0 (0+0)	+1:12.4
9	13	Jeremy Teela	United States	25:21.7	2 (1+1)	+1:13.9
10	5	Ivan Tcherezov	Russia	25:25.9	2 (1+1)	+1:18.1
11	42	Simon Eder	Austria	25:32.2	0 (0+0)	+1:24.4
12	7	Christoph Sumann	Austria	25:32.7	2 (2+0)	+1:24.9
13	11	Thomas Frei	Switzerland	25:36.9	0 (0+0)	+1:29.1
14	15	Ilmārs Bricis	Latvia	25:41.3	2 (1+1)	+1:33.5
15	24	Evgeny Ustyugov	Russia	25:47.9	2 (0+2)	+1:40.1
16	37	Simon Hallenbarter	Switzerland	25:48.3	2 (2+0)	+1:40.5
17	21	Ole Einar Bjørndalen	Norway	25:48.9	4 (3+1)	+1:41.1
18	22	Michal Šlesingr	Czech Republic	25:50.9	1 (0+1)	+1:43.1
19	58	Christoph Stephan	Germany	25:51.1	1 (0+1)	+1:43.3
20	18	Alexandr Syman	Belarus	25:53.5	0 (0+0)	+1:45.7
21	31	Michael Greis	Germany	25:56.0	3 (1+2)	+1:48.2
22	39	Serhiy Sednev	Ukraine	25:57.2	0 (0+0)	+1:49.4
23	70	Andreas Birnbacher	Germany	26:06.4	1 (0+1)	+1:58.6
24	73	Halvard Hanevold	Norway	26:07.7	1 (1+0)	+1:59.9
25	25	Krasimir Anev	Bulgaria	26:09.1	0 (0+0)	+2:01.3
26	66	Matthias Simmen	Switzerland	26:11.5	1 (1+0)	+2:03.7
27	47	Janez Marič	Slovenia	26:12.5	2 (1+1)	+2:04.7
28	64	Zdeněk Vítek	Czech Republic	26:13.7	1 (0+1)	+2:05.9
29	32	Tomasz Sikora	Poland	26:16.2	2 (0+2)	+2:08.4
30	76	Anton Shipulin	Russia	26:18.7	1 (0+1)	+2:10.9
31	19	Indrek Tobreluts	Estonia	26:18.9	1 (0+1)	+2:11.1
32	49	Zhang Chengye	China	26:19.9	1 (0+1)	+2:12.1
33	83	Serhiy Semenov	Ukraine	26:20.5	1 (0+1)	+2:12.7
34	27	Dominik Landertinger	Austria	26:23.7	4 (2+2)	+2:15.9
35	44	Martin Fourcade	France	26:25.6	3 (3+0)	+2:17.8
36	62	Lowell Bailey	United States	26:26.6	0 (0+0)	+2:18.8
37	34	Arnd Peiffer	Germany	26:29.1	2 (1+1)	+2:21.3
38	85	Fredrik Lindström	Sweden	26:33.3	1 (1+0)	+2:25.5
39	48	Yan Savitskiy	Kazakhstan	26:35.2	1 (1+0)	+2:27.4
40	71	Sergey Novikov	Belarus	26:37.4	1 (1+0)	+2:29.6
40	72	Timo Antila	Finland	26:37.4	1 (1+0)	+2:29.6
42	43	Carl Johan Bergman	Sweden	26:41.7	2 (1+1)	+2:33.9
43	38	Rustam Valiullin	Belarus	26:43.7	2 (1+1)	+2:35.9
44	63	Markus Windisch	Italy	26:44.7	0 (0+0)	+2:36.9
45	54	Daniel Mesotitsch	Austria	26:45.3	2 (1+1)	+2:37.5
46	56	Lars Berger	Norway	26:53.0	4 (2+2)	+2:45.2
47	29	Tim Burke	United States	26:54.8	3 (1+2)	+2:47.0
48	82	Kauri Koiv	Estonia	26:56.0	2 (1+1)	+2:48.2
49	84	Evgeny Abramenko	Belarus	26:57.8	0 (0+0)	+2:50.0
50	75	Andrejs Rastorgujevs	Latvia	27:05.3	3 (2+1)	+2:57.5
51	20	Alexsandr Chervyhkov	Kazakhstan	27:09.9	3 (1+2)	+3:02.1
52	40	Jaroslav Soukup	Czech Republic	27:10.4	2 (1+1)	+3:02.6
53	36	Vincent Defrasne	France	27:14.6	3 (2+1)	+3.06.8
54	51	Jay Hakkinen	United States	27:17.4	0 (0+0)	+3.09.6
55	23	Lee-Steve Jackson	Great Britain	27:18.1	2 (1+1)	+3:10.3
56	33	Lukas Hofer	Italy	27:18.3	4 (2+2)	+3:10.5
57	65	Vasja Rupnik	Slovenia	27:20.8	3 (0+3)	+3:13.0
58	87	Peter Dokl	Slovenia	27:21.0	0 (0+0)	+3:13.2
59	59	Michail Kletcherov	Bulgaria	27:23.1	0 (0+0)	+3.15.3
60	79	Mattia Cola	Italy	27:24.9	1 (0+1)	+3.17.1
61	46	Christian de Lorenzi	Italy	27:25.9	4 (2+2)	+3.18.1
62	55	Roland Lessing	Estonia	27:26.0	3 (2+1)	+3.18.2
63	53	Maxim Tchoudov	Russia	27:28.0	2 (1+1)	+3.20.2
64	86	Kristaps Libietis	Latvia	27:32.5	1 (1+0)	+3.24.7
65	3	Lee In-Bok	South Korea	27:34.1	4 (1+3)	+3:26.3
66	67	Marek Matiasko	Slovakia	27:37.4	3 (1+2)	+3:29.6
67	88	Ondřej Moravec	Czech Republic	27:39.8	3 (2+1)	+3:32.0
68	30	Hidenori Isa	Japan	27:42.2	3 (1+2)	+3:34.4
69	81	Benjamin Weger	Switzerland	27:43.6	3 (3+0)	+3:35.8
70	1	Victor Pinzaru	Moldova	27:52.6	1 (1+0)	+3:44.8
71	17	Simon Fourcade	France	27:53.0	4 (1+3)	+3:45.2
72	68	Dias Keneshev	Kazakhstan	28:04.6	1 (0+1)	+3:56.8
73	45	Paavo Puurunen	Finland	28:04.8	4 (2+2)	+3:57.0
74	74	Martten Kaldvee	Estonia	28:07.7	2 (2+1)	+3:59.9
75	50	Dušan Šimočko	Slovakia	28:11.4	3 (1+2)	+4:03.6
76	77	Miroslav Matiaško	Slovakia	28:15.9	4 (1+3)	+4:08.1
77	69	Vyacheslav Derkach	Ukraine	28:22.9	3 (0+3)	+4:15.1
78	41	Edgars Piksons	Latvia	28:23.0	2 (1+1)	+4:15.2
79	60	Magnus Jonsson	Sweden	28:29.2	3 (0+3)	+4:21.4
80	12	Imre Tagscherer	Hungary	28:38.8	4 (2+2)	+4:31.0
81	16	Milanko Petrović	Serbia	28:38.9	4 (1+3)	+4:31.1
82	80	Miroslav Kenanov	Bulgaria	28:40.2	1 (1+0)	+4:32.4
83	61	Vladimir Iliev	Bulgaria	28:45.0	3 (1+2)	+4:37.2
84	78	Nikolay Braichenko	Kazakhstan	28:52.0	3 (1+2)	+4:44.2
85	57	Łukasz Szczurek	Poland	29:02.0	2 (1+1)	+4:54.2
86	35	Øystein Slettemark	Denmark	30:55.8	7 (3+4)	+6:48.0
87	28	Alexei Almoukov	Australia	30:57.9	4 (3+1)	+6:50.1
	52	Athanassios Tsakiris	Greece		5 (2+3)	DNF
