= Kazakhstan at the 2010 Winter Olympics =

- IOC code: KAZ
- NOC: National Olympic Committee of the Republic of Kazakhstan
- Website: www.olympic.kz (in Kazakh, Russian, and English)

in Vancouver
- Competitors: 37 in 8 sports
- Flag bearer: Dias Keneshev
- Medals Ranked 25th: Gold 0 Silver 1 Bronze 0 Total 1

Winter Olympics appearances (overview)
- 1994; 1998; 2002; 2006; 2010; 2014; 2018; 2022; 2026

Other related appearances
- Soviet Union (1956–1988); Unified Team (1992)

Kazakhstan participated in the 2010 Winter Olympics in Vancouver, British Columbia, Canada. Kazakhstan was represented by 37 athletes in eight sports. Elena Khrustaleva won the country's only medal- a silver in the 15km individual biathlon.

== Medalists ==
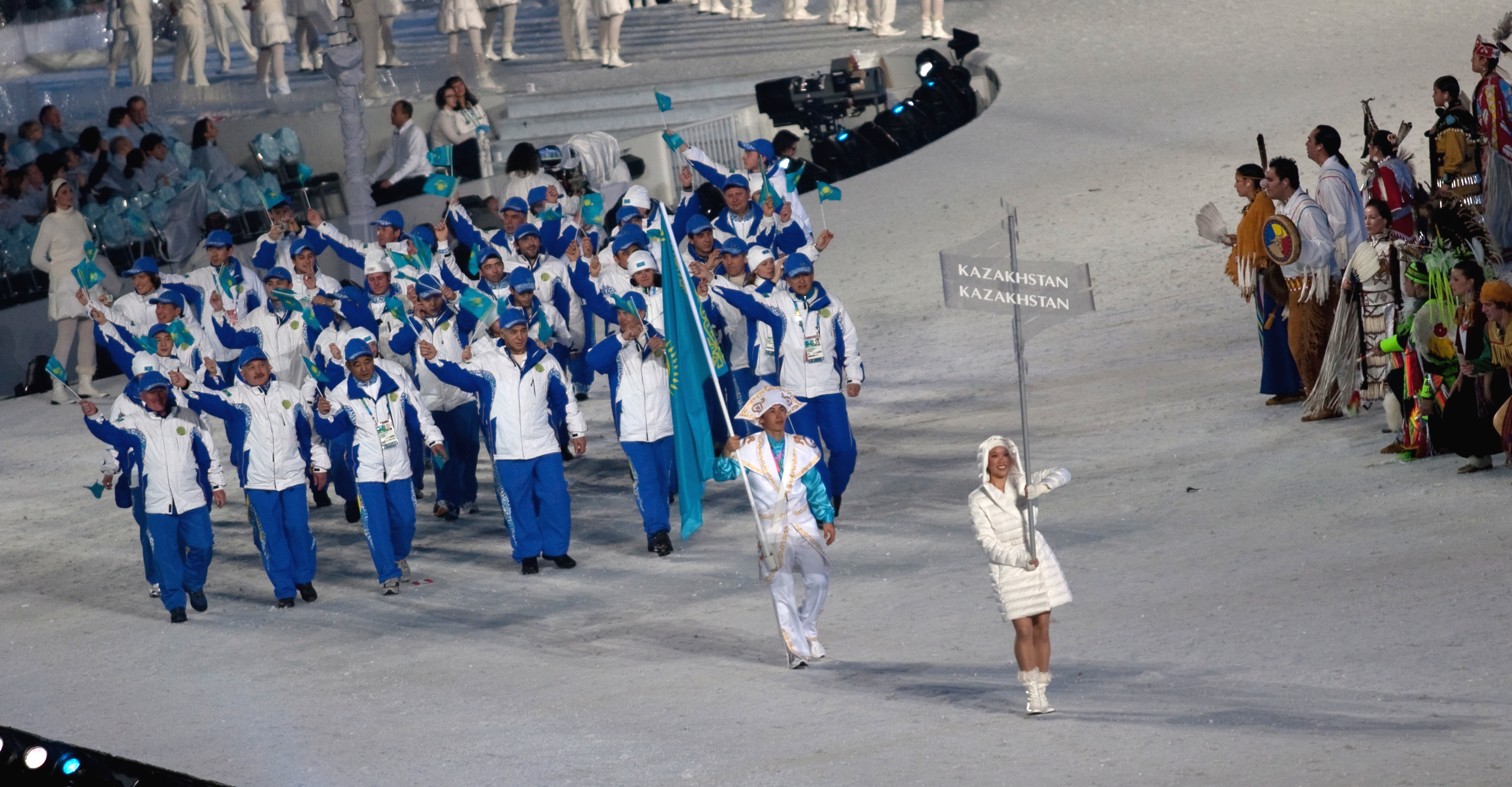
The athletes entering the stadium during the opening ceremonies

Medal	Name	Sport	Event	Date
Silver	Elena Khrustaleva	Biathlon	Women's individual	18 February

== Alpine skiing ==
Athlete	Event	Run 1	Run 2	Total	Rank
Lyudmila Fedotova	Women's downhill			2:01.58	36
Lyudmila Fedotova	Women's super-G			1:31.43	38
Lyudmila Fedotova	Women's giant slalom	DNF			
Lyudmila Fedotova	Women's slalom	DNS			
Igor Zakurdaev	Men's downhill			1:59.80	50
Igor Zakurdaev	Men's super-G			1:36.97	43
Igor Zakurdaev	Men's combined	Downhill; 1:58.95	Slalom; 57.25	2:56.20	33
Igor Zakurdaev	Men's giant slalom	1:24.50	1:26.86	2:51.36	51
Igor Zakurdaev	Men's slalom	54.41	58.40	1:52.81	38

== Biathlon ==
Men

Athlete	Event	Final		
Athlete	Event	Time	Misses	Rank
Nikolay Braichenko	Sprint	28:52.0	3	84
Alexsandr Chervyhkov	Individual	53:53.1	4	50
Alexsandr Chervyhkov	Sprint	27:09.9	3	51
Alexsandr Chervyhkov	Pursuit	37:30.5	3	49
Dias Keneshev	Individual	56:27.0	4	72
Dias Keneshev	Sprint	28:04.6	1	72
Yan Savitskiy	Individual	55:07.3	5	64
Yan Savitskiy	Sprint	26:35.2	1	39
Yan Savitskiy	Pursuit	35:49.6	1	27
Alexandr Trifonov	Individual	55:53.1	4	69
Alexsandr Chervyhkov; Yan Savitskiy; Dias Keneshev; Alexandr Trifonov	Relay	1:30:31.1	4+13	17

Women

Athlete	Event	Final		
Athlete	Event	Time	Misses	Rank
Lyubov Filimonova	Individual	46:45.4	3	57
Lyubov Filimonova	Sprint	22:44.4	2	67
Elena Khrustaleva	Individual	41:13.5	0	Silver medal
Elena Khrustaleva	Sprint	20:20.4	0	5
Elena Khrustaleva	Pursuit	31:42.1	3	11
Elena Khrustaleva	Mass start	39:01.3	5	27
Anna Lebedeva	Individual	44:36.3	2	38
Anna Lebedeva	Pursuit	34:49.8	2	44
Anna Lebedeva	Sprint	22:15.1	0	52
Marina Lebedeva	Individual	48:04.9	3	71
Marina Lebedeva	Sprint	22:27.0	1	58
Marina Lebedeva	Pursuit	LAP	5	-
Elena Khrustaleva; Anna Lebedeva; Lyubov Filimonova; Marina Lebedeva	Relay	1:13:42.9	0+9	14

== Cross-country skiing ==
Men

Athlete	Event	Final		
Athlete	Event	Time	Deficit	Rank
Nikolay Chebotko	15 km freestyle	35:34.1	+1:57.8	38
Sergey Cherepanov	15 m freestyle	35:50.8	+2:14.6	47
Sergey Cherepanov	30 km pursuit	1:23:43.7	+8:32.3	49
Alexey Poltaranin	15 km freestyle	34:50.5	+1:14.2	14
Alexey Poltaranin	50 km classical	2:09:29.6	+3:54.1	27
Yevgeniy Velichko	15 km freestyle	36:33.0	+2:56.7	56
Yevgeniy Velichko	30 km pursuit	1:18:00.2	+2:48.8	28
Yevgeniy Velichko	50 km classical	2:13:01.5	+7:26.0	39
Sergey Cherepanov; Alexey Poltaranin; Yevgeniy Velichko; Nikolay Chebotko	4 x 10 km relay	1:49:49.1	+4:43.7	11

Women

Athlete	Event	Final		
Athlete	Event	Time	Deficit	Rank
Oxana Jatskaja	10 km freestyle	27:16.3	+2:17.9	40
Oxana Jatskaja	15 km pursuit	42:53.0	+2:54.9	33
Oxana Jatskaja	30 km classical	1:34:11.0	+3:37.3	19
Elena Kolomina	10 km freestyle	26:35.6	+1:37.2	27
Elena Kolomina	15 km pursuit	42:48.4	+2:50.3	28
Elena Kolomina	30 km classical	1:37:53.0	+7:19.3	34
Svetlana Malahova-Shishkina	10 km freestyle	25:53.9	+55.5	10
Svetlana Malahova-Shishkina	15 km pursuit	42:27.1	+2:29.0	25
Svetlana Malahova-Shishkina	30 km classical	1:41:01.6	+10:27.9	43
Marina Matrossova	15 km pursuit	44:36.2	+4:38.1	48
Marina Matrossova	30 km classical	1:38:00.6	+7:26.9	35
Tatjana Roshina	10 km freestyle	27:06.6	+2:08.2	36
Elena Kolomina; Oxana Jatskaja; Tatjana Roshina; Svetlana Malahova-Shishkina	4 x 5 km relay	58:23.3	+3:03.8	9

Sprint

Athlete	Event	Qualifying		Quarterfinal		Semifinal		Final	
Athlete	Event	Total	Rank	Total	Rank	Total	Rank	Total	Rank
Nikolay Chebotko	Men's sprint	3:37.84	8 Q	3:38.6	3	did not advance			13
Sergey Cherepanov	Men's sprint	3:48.29	48	did not advance					48
Yevgeniy Koshevoy	Men's sprint	3:49.51	52	did not advance					52
Alexey Poltaranin	Men's sprint	3:38.68	15 Q	3:34.7	2 Q	3:35.6	4 Q	3:54.4	5
Oxana Jatskaja	Women's sprint	3:51.27	32	did not advance					32
Elena Kolomina	Women's sprint	3:52.12	36	did not advance					36
Elena Antonova	Women's sprint	4:01.35	45	did not advance					45
Marina Matrossova	Women's sprint	4:03.14	48	did not advance					48
Nikolay Chebotko; Alexey Poltaranin	Men's team sprint					18:45.3 q	5	19:07.5	5
Oxana Jatskaja; Elena Kolomina	Women's team sprint					19:33.6	6	did not advance	

== Figure skating ==
Athlete(s)	Event	SP		FS		Total	
Athlete(s)	Event	Points	Rank	Points	Rank	Points	Rank
Denis Ten	Men	76.54	10	135.01	14	211.25	11
Abzal Rakimgaliyev	Men	55.88	26	Did not advance to free skate			

== Freestyle skiing ==
Athlete	Event	Qualifying		Final	
Athlete	Event	Points	Rank	Points	Rank
Zhibek Arapbayeva	Women's aerials	86.98	23	Did not advance	
Dmitriy Barmashov	Men's moguls	11.56	29	Did not advance	
Dmitry Reiherd	Men's moguls	24.26	9 Q	19.23	18
Yulia Galysheva	Women's moguls	21.51	16 Q	22.17	11
Yuliya Rodionova	Women's moguls	20.73	22	Did not advance	
Darya Rybalova	Women's moguls	21.31	17 Q	20.85	14

== Short track speed skating ==
Athlete	Event	Heat		Quarterfinal		Semifinal		Final	
Athlete	Event	Time	Rank	Time	Rank	Time	Rank	Time	Rank
Aidar Bekzhanov	Men's 500 m	DSQ		DNQ					
Aidar Bekzhanov	Men's 1000 m	1:26.536	4	Did not advance					

== Ski jumping ==
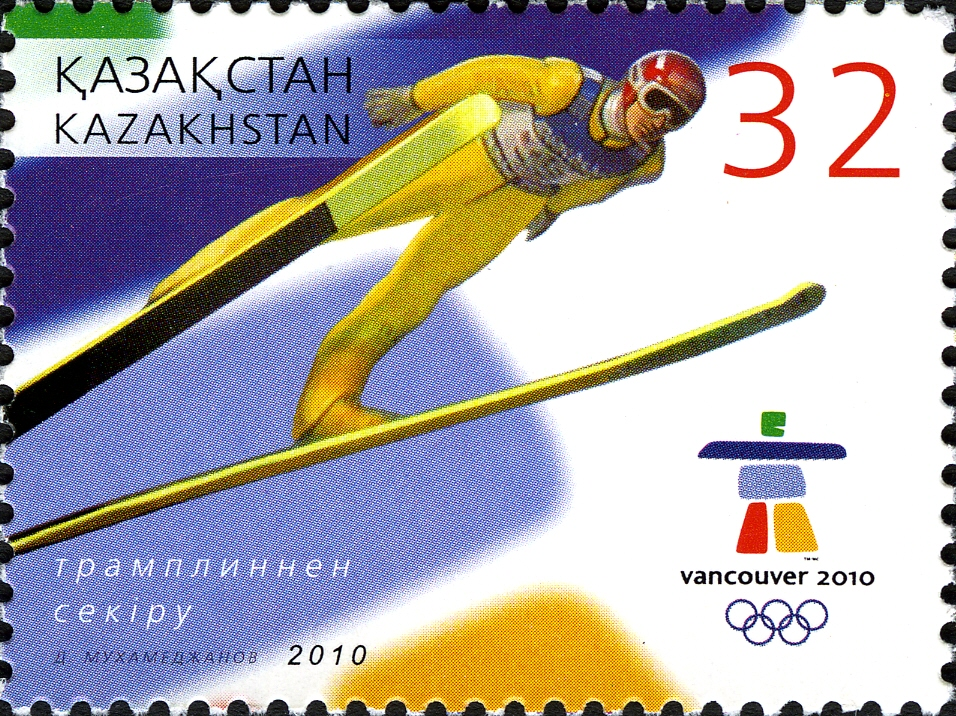
Kazakhstan ski jumping stamp commemorating the 2010 Olympics

Athlete	Event	Qualifying		First round		Final		
Athlete	Event	Points	Rank	Points	Rank	Points	Total	Rank
Nikolay Karpenko	Normal hill	114.5	31	113.0	30	116.0	229.0	29
Nikolay Karpenko	Large hill	100.2	41	Did not advance				
Alex Korolev	Normal hill	116.0	29	105.0	44	Did not advance		44
Alex Korolev	Large hill	109.3	32	79.8	39	Did not advance		39

== Speed skating ==
Athlete	Event	Race 1		Final	
Athlete	Event	Time	Rank	Time	Rank
Dmitry Babenko	Men's 5000 metres			6:31.19	15
Roman Krech	Men's 500 metres	36.26	35	36.27	34
Roman Krech	Men's 1000 metres			1:11.26	28
Denis Kuzin	Men's 1000 metres			1:10.88	23
Denis Kuzin	Men's 1500 metres			1:49.05	23
Yekaterina Aydova	Women's 500 metres	39.02	19	39.116	18
Yekaterina Aydova	Women's 1000 metres			1:17.85	16
Yekaterina Aydova	Women's 1500 metres			2:02.81	29

== See also ==
- Kazakhstan at the Olympics
- Kazakhstan at the 2010 Winter Paralympics
