= Chelsea Marshall =

American alpine skier (born 1986)

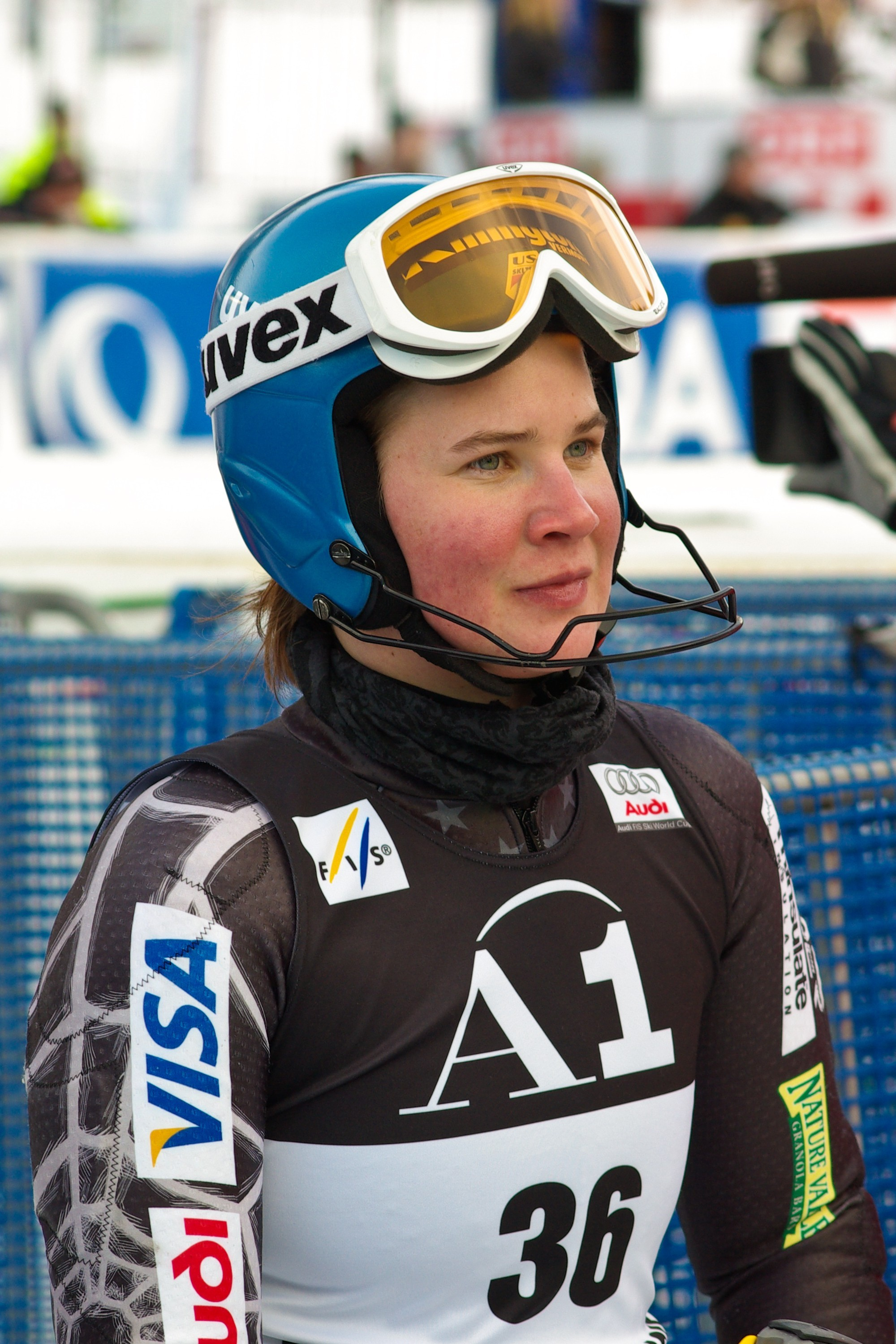
Marshall in 2009

Chelsea Marshall (born August 14, 1986, in Randolph, Vermont) is an American alpine ski racer who has competed since 2002. Her best World Cup finish was eighth in a downhill event in Italy in 2008.

Marshall finished 27th in the downhill event at the FIS Alpine World Ski Championships 2009 in Val d'Isère.

She was named to the US Olympic team for the 2010 Winter Olympics in late 2009.
