= Oleksandr Lazarovych =

Ukrainian ski jumper

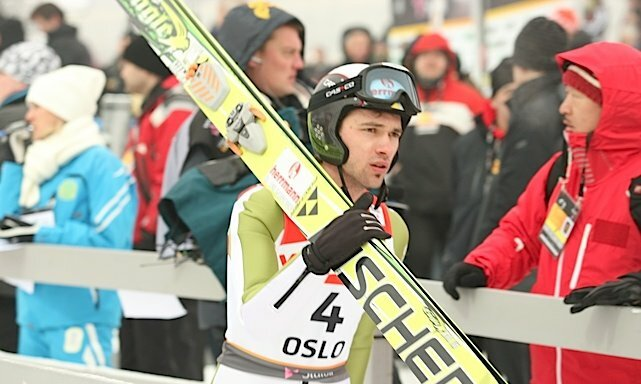

Personal information
- Nickname: Shurik
- Born: 30 August 1984 (age 41) Vorokhta, Ukrainian SSR

Sport
- Sport: Skiing
- Club: Vorokhta Ski School

World Cup career
- Seasons: 2007-present
- Indiv. wins: 0
- Updated on 27 March 2010

Oleksandr Lazarovych (Ukrainian: Олександр Лазарович) (born 30 August 1984) is a Ukrainian ski jumper who has competed since 2003. At the 2010 Winter Olympics, he did not advance passed the qualifying rounds of the individual large hill and individual normal hill events.

Lazarovych's best finish at the FIS Nordic World Ski Championships was 13th twice in the team large hill event (2003, 2007) while his best individual finish was 38th in the individual normal hill event at Liberec in 2009.

His best World Cup finish was ninth in a team large hill event at Finland in 2008 while his best individual finish was 28th in an individual large hill event at Germany the following year.
