= Vitaliy Shumbarets =

Ukrainian ski jumper

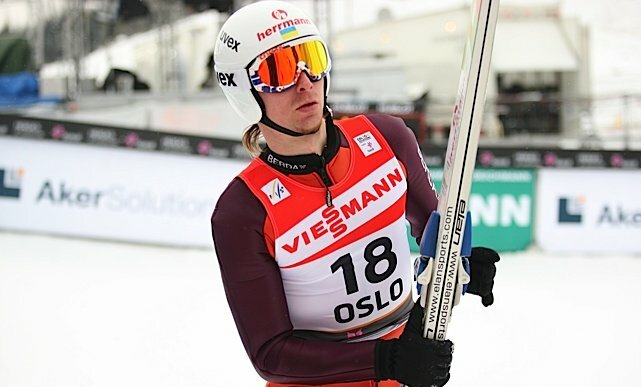
Vitaliy Shumbarets in 2011

Vitaliy Shumbarets (born 14 July 1983 in Kremenets, Ternopil Oblast) is a Ukrainian ski jumper who has competed since 2003. He finished 45th in the individual normal hill event at the 2010 Winter Olympics in Vancouver, British Columbia, Canada.

Shumbaret's best finish at the FIS Nordic World Ski Championships was 13th in the team large hill event twice (2003, 2007) while his best individual finish was 35th in the individual large hill event at Liberec in 2009.

His best World cup finish was ninth in a team large hill event at Finland in 2008 while his best individual finish was 21st in an individual large hill event at Japan in January 2010.
