= David Lazzaroni =

French ski jumper (born 1985)

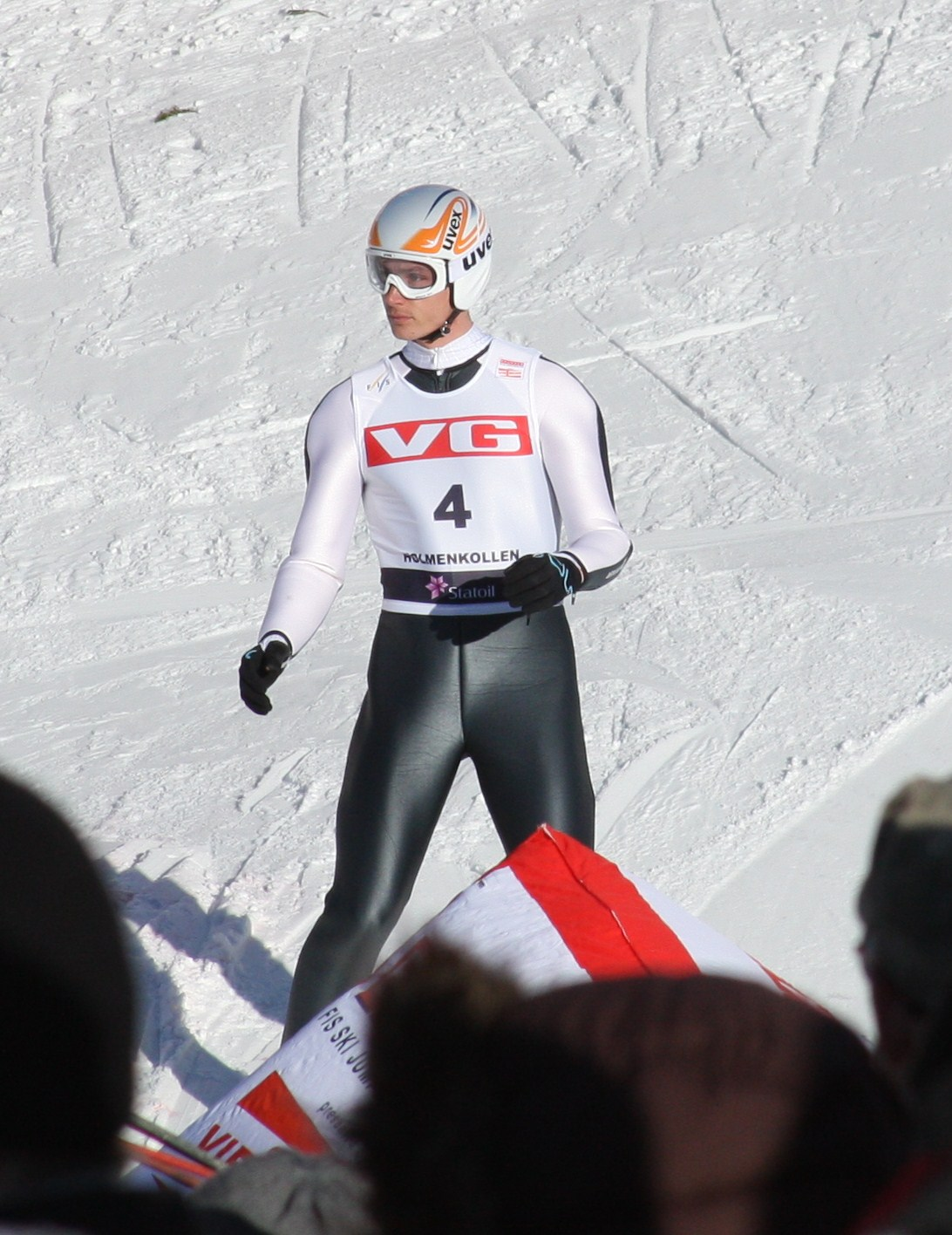
- Lazzaroni at Holmenkollen in 2010
- Born: 4 February 1985 (age 40); Échirolles, Isère, France

David Lazzaroni (born 4 February 1985 in Échirolles) is a French ski jumper who has competed since 2002. At the 2010 Winter Olympics in Vancouver, he finished ninth in the team large hill, 34th in the team large hill, and 47th in the individual normal hill events.

Lazzaroni's best finish at the FIS Nordic World Ski Championships was eighth in the team large hill event at Liberec in 2009.

His best World Cup finish was seventh in an HS 128 event at Norway in 2008.
