= Alexandre Mabboux =

French ski jumper (born 1991)

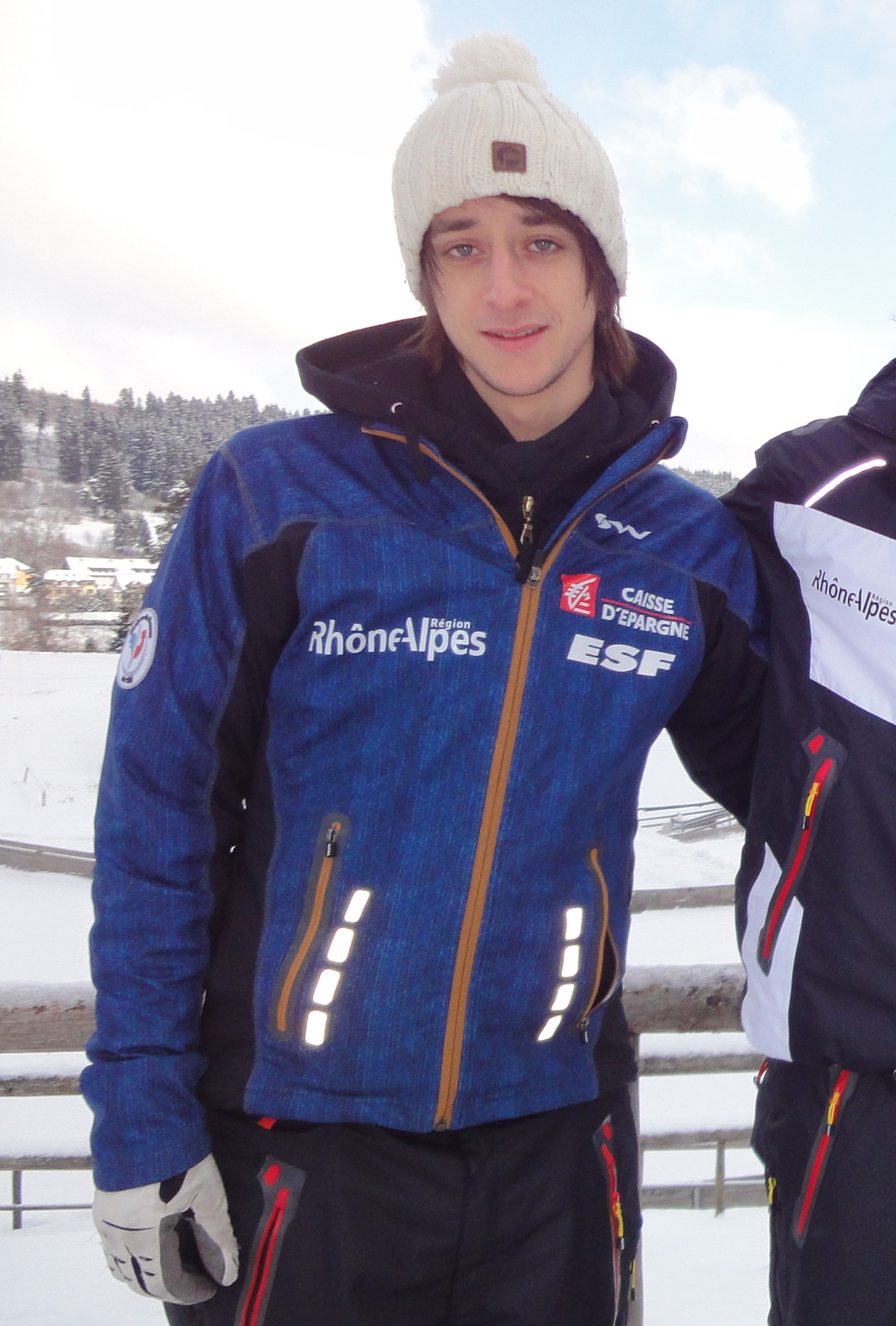
Alexandre Mabboux.

Alexandre Mabboux (born September 19, 1991) is a French ski jumper who has competed since 2006. At the FIS Nordic World Ski Championships 2009 in Liberec, he finished eighth in the team large hill and 42nd in the individual normal hill events. He competed for France at the 2010 Winter Olympics.

Mabboux's best World Cup finish was seventh in a team large hill event at Germany in February 2010.
