= List of flag bearers for Andorra at the Olympics =

Andorra at the Olympics
- IOC code: AND
- NOC: Andorran Olympic Committee
- Website: www.coa.ad (in Catalan)
- Medals: Gold 0 Silver 0 Bronze 0 Total 0

Summer appearances
- 1976; 1980; 1984; 1988; 1992; 1996; 2000; 2004; 2008; 2012; 2016; 2020; 2024; 2028

Winter appearances
- 1976; 1980; 1984; 1988; 1992; 1994; 1998; 2002; 2006; 2010; 2014; 2018; 2022; 2026

This is a list of flag bearers who have represented Andorra at the Olympics.

Flag bearers carry the national flag of their country at the opening ceremony of the Olympic Games.

| # | Event year | Season | Flag bearer | Sport | |
|---|---|---|---|---|---|
| 1 | 1976 | Winter | | | |
| 2 | 1976 | Summer | Esteve Dolsa | Shooting | |
| 3 | 1980 | Winter | Carlos Font | Alpine skiing | |
| 4 | 1980 | Summer | Francesc Gaset Fris | Shooting | (Note: Marched under the Olympic flag) |
| 5 | 1984 | Winter | Albert Llovera | Alpine skiing | |
| 6 | 1984 | Summer | Joan Tomàs Roca | Shooting | |
| 7 | 1988 | Winter | Claudina Rossel | Alpine skiing | |
| 8 | 1988 | Summer | Josep Graells | Athletics | |
| 9 | 1992 | Winter | | | |
| 10 | 1992 | Summer | Maggy Moreno | Athletics | |
| 11 | 1994 | Winter | Vicky Grau | Alpine skiing | |
| 12 | 1996 | Summer | Aitor Osorio | Swimming | |
| 13 | 1998 | Winter | Victor Gómez | Alpine skiing | |
| 14 | 2000 | Summer | Toni Bernadó | Athletics | |
| 15 | 2002 | Winter | Victor Gómez | Alpine skiing | |
| 16 | 2004 | Summer | Hocine Haciane | Swimming | |
| 17 | 2006 | Winter | Alex Antor | Alpine skiing | |
| 18 | 2008 | Summer | Montserrat García | Canoeing | |
| 19 | 2010 | Winter | Lluís Marín | Snowboarding | |
| 20 | 2012 | Summer | Joan Tomàs Roca | Shooting | |
| 21 | 2014 | Winter | Mireia Gutiérrez | Alpine skiing | |
| 22 | 2016 | Summer | Laura Sallés | Judo | |
| 23 | 2018 | Winter | Irineu Esteve Altimiras | Cross-country skiing | |
| 24 | 2020 | Summer | Mònica Dòria | Canoeing | |
| 24 | 2020 | Summer | Pol Moya | Athletics | |
| 25 | 2022 | Winter | Maeva Estevez | Snowboarding | |
| 26 | 2024 | Summer | Nahuel Carabaña | Athletics | |
| 26 | 2024 | Summer | Mònica Dòria | Canoeing | |
| 27 | 2026 | Winter | Joan Verdú | Alpine Skiing | |
| 27 | 2026 | Winter | Cande Moreno | Alpine Skiing | |
| 27 | 2026 | Winter | Irineu Esteve Altimiras | Cross-country skiing | |

== See also ==
- Andorra at the Olympics
