= Andorra at the Olympics =

- IOC code: AND
- NOC: Andorran Olympic Committee
- Website: www.coa.ad (in Catalan)
- Medals: Gold 0 Silver 0 Bronze 0 Total 0

Summer appearances
- 1976; 1980; 1984; 1988; 1992; 1996; 2000; 2004; 2008; 2012; 2016; 2020; 2024; 2028

Winter appearances
- 1976; 1980; 1984; 1988; 1992; 1994; 1998; 2002; 2006; 2010; 2014; 2018; 2022; 2026

Andorra first participated at the Olympic Games in 1976, appearing in both the Winter Olympic Games and Summer Olympic Games. The nation has appeared in every games since it first entered.

Andorran athletes have never won a medal in the Summer nor Winter Games, with its best placement being 6th by canoeist Mònica Dòria at the Women's slalom C-1 at the 2024 Summer Olympics. At the Summer Games, they have competed in sports including cycling, swimming, athletics, shooting and judo. As a mountainous country with popular skiing resorts, Andorra's Winter Olympic delegation has often been as large as or larger than its Summer team, and all its participations have come in skiing or snowboarding sports.

They have been represented by Comitè Olímpic Andorrà since 1976.

== Medal tables ==
=== Medals by Summer Games ===
Games	Athletes	Gold	Silver	Bronze	Total	Rank
1976 Montreal	3	0	0	0	0	–
1980 Moscow	2	0	0	0	0	–
1984 Los Angeles	2	0	0	0	0	–
1988 Seoul	3	0	0	0	0	–
1992 Barcelona	8	0	0	0	0	–
1996 Atlanta	8	0	0	0	0	–
2000 Sydney	5	0	0	0	0	–
2004 Athens	6	0	0	0	0	–
2008 Beijing	5	0	0	0	0	–
2012 London	6	0	0	0	0	–
2016 Rio de Janeiro	5	0	0	0	0	–
2020 Tokyo	2	0	0	0	0	–
2024 Paris	2	0	0	0	0	–
2028 Los Angeles	future event					
2032 Brisbane	future event					
Total		0	0	0	0	–

=== Medals by Winter Games ===
Games	Athletes	Gold	Silver	Bronze	Total	Rank
1976 Innsbruck	5	0	0	0	0	–
1980 Lake Placid	3	0	0	0	0	–
1984 Sarajevo	2	0	0	0	0	–
1988 Calgary	4	0	0	0	0	–
1992 Albertville	5	0	0	0	0	–
1994 Lillehammer	6	0	0	0	0	–
1998 Nagano	3	0	0	0	0	–
2002 Salt Lake City	3	0	0	0	0	–
2006 Turin	3	0	0	0	0	–
2010 Vancouver	6	0	0	0	0	–
2014 Sochi	6	0	0	0	0	–
2018 Pyeongchang	5	0	0	0	0	–
2022 Beijing	5	0	0	0	0	–
2026 Milano Cortina	7	0	0	0	0	–
2030 French Alps	future event					
2034 Utah	future event					
Total		0	0	0	0	–

== Flagbearers ==
Summer Olympics
Games	Athlete	Sport
1976 Montreal	Esteve Dolsa	Shooting
1980 Moscow		
1984 Los Angeles	Joan Tomàs Roca	Shooting
1988 Seoul	Josep Graells	Athletics
1992 Barcelona	Maggy Moreno	Athletics
1996 Atlanta	Aitor Osorio	Swimming
2000 Sydney	Toni Bernadó	Athletics
2004 Athens	Hocine Haciane	Swimming
2008 Beijing	Montserrat García	Canoeing
2012 London	Joan Tomàs Roca	Shooting
2016 Rio de Janeiro	Laura Sallés	Judo
2020 Tokyo	Mònica Dòria	Canoeing
2020 Tokyo	Pol Moya	Canoeing
2024 Paris	Nahuel Carabaña	Athletics
2024 Paris	Mònica Dòria	Canoeing

Winter Olympics
Games	Athlete	Sport
1976 Innsbruck		
1980 Lake Placid	Carlos Font	Alpine skiing
1984 Sarajevo		
1988 Calgary	Claudina Rossel	Alpine skiing
1992 Albertville		
1994 Lillehammer	Vicky Grau	Alpine skiing
1998 Nagano	Victor Gómez	Alpine skiing
2002 Salt Lake City	Victor Gómez	Alpine skiing
2006 Turin	Alex Antor	Alpine skiing
2010 Vancouver	Lluís Marín	Snowboarding
2014 Sochi	Mireia Gutiérrez	Alpine skiing
2018 Pyeongchang	Irineu Esteve Altimiras	Cross-country skiing
2022 Beijing	Maeva Estévez	Snowboarding
2026 Milano Cortina	Joan Verdú	Alpine skiing
2026 Milano Cortina	Cande Moreno	Alpine skiing
2026 Milano Cortina	Irineu Esteve Altimiras	Cross-country skiing
