= Andorra at the 1996 Summer Olympics =

- IOC code: AND
- NOC: Andorran Olympic Committee

in Atlanta
- Competitors: 8 (6 men and 2 women) in 5 sports
- Flag bearer: Aitor Osorio
- Medals: Gold 0 Silver 0 Bronze 0 Total 0

Summer Olympics appearances (overview)
- 1976; 1980; 1984; 1988; 1992; 1996; 2000; 2004; 2008; 2012; 2016; 2020; 2024

Andorra was represented at the 1996 Summer Olympics in Atlanta, Georgia, United States by the Andorran Olympic Committee.

In total, eight athletes including six men and two woman represented Andorra in five different sports including athletics, judo, sailing, shooting and swimming.

== Competitors ==
In total, eight athletes represented Andorra at the 1996 Summer Olympics in Atlanta, Georgia, United States across five different sports.

Sport	Men	Women	Total
Athletics	1	0	1
Judo	1	0	1
Sailing	2	1	3
Shooting	1	0	1
Swimming	1	1	2
Total	6	2	8

== Athletics ==
In total, one Andorran athlete participated in the athletics events – Antoni Bernadó in the men's marathon.

The men's marathon took place on 4 August 1996 at 7:05 am. The course began and ended at the Centennial Olympic Stadium and followed the general route of the Atlanta Marathon. Bernadó completed the race in a time of two hours 31 minutes and 28 seconds to finish 87th overall.

Athlete	Event	Final	
Athlete	Event	Result	Rank
Antoni Bernadó	Marathon	2-31:28	87

== Judo ==
In total, one Andorran athlete participated in the judo events – Antoni Molne in the men's −65 kg category.

The men's men's −65 kg category took place on 25 July 1996. Molne received a bye in the round of 64. In the round of 32, he lost by ippon to Timur Mukhamedkhanov of Uzbekistan.

Athlete	Event	Round of 64	Round of 32	Round of 16	Quarterfinals	Semifinals	Repechage 1	Repechage 2	Repechage 3	Final / BM
Athlete	Event	Opposition Result	Opposition Result	Opposition Result	Opposition Result	Opposition Result	Opposition Result	Opposition Result	Opposition Result	Rank
Antoni Molne	−65 kg	Bye	Mukhamedkhanov (UZB); L	did not advance						

== Sailing ==
In total, three Andorran athletes participated in the sailing events – Fiona Morrison in the women's mistral and David Ramón and Oscar Ramón in the men's 470.

The nine races in the women's mistral competition took place from 23–29 July 1996. Morrison achieved her best result in race five finishing 20th. Overall, she finished with a net 153 points and placed 24th.

The 11 races in the men's 470 competition took place from 24 July – 1 August 1996. Rámon and Rámon achieved their best result in race nine finishing 11th. Overall, they finished with a net 183 points and placed 27th.

Athlete	Event	Race											Total	
Athlete	Event	1	2	3	4	5	6	7	8	9	10	11	Points	Rank
Fiona Morrison	Women's mistral	~~PMS~~	23	~~25~~	24	20	22	22	24	18	—N/a		153	24
David Ramón; Oscar Ramón	Men's 470	23	~~31~~	24	~~35~~	23	17	12	26	11	28	19	183	27

== Shooting ==
In total, one Andorran athlete participated in the shooting events – Gerard Barcia in the men's trap.

The preliminary round for the men's trap took place on 20 July 1996. Barcia scored 117 points in the preliminary round. He did not advance to the final round and finished joint-37th overall.

Athlete	Event	Final	
Athlete	Event	Points	Rank
Gerard Barcia	Trap	117	37T

== Swimming ==
In total, two Andorran athletes participated in the swimming events – Aitor Osorio in the men's 200 m butterfly and Meritxell Sabaté in the women's 200 m individual medley.

The heats for the men's 200 m butterfly took place on 22 July 1996. Osorio finished third in his heat in a time of two minutes 12.59 seconds which was ultimately not fast enough to qualify for the finals.

The heats for the women's 200 m individual medley took place on 24 July 1996. Sabaté finished second in her heat in a time of two minutes 37.38 seconds which was ultimately not fast enough to qualify for the finals.

Athlete	Event	Heat		Semifinal		Final	
Athlete	Event	Time	Rank	Time	Rank	Time	Rank
Aitor Osorio	Men's 200 m butterfly	2:12.56	42	did not advance			
Meritxell Sabaté	Women's 200 m individual medley	2:37.38	42	did not advance			
