= Andorra at the 1992 Summer Olympics =

- IOC code: AND
- NOC: Andorran Olympic Committee

in Barcelona
- Competitors: 8 (7 men and 1 woman) in 5 sports
- Flag bearer: Margarida Moreno
- Medals: Gold 0 Silver 0 Bronze 0 Total 0

Summer Olympics appearances (overview)
- 1976; 1980; 1984; 1988; 1992; 1996; 2000; 2004; 2008; 2012; 2016; 2020; 2024; 2028

Andorra competed at the 1992 Summer Olympics in Barcelona, Spain. Eight competitors, seven men and one woman, took part in five events in five sports.

== Competitors ==
The following is the list of number of competitors in the Games.

Sport	Men	Women	Total
Athletics	0	1	1
Cycling	3	0	3
Judo	1	0	1
Sailing	2	0	2
Shooting	1	0	1
Total	7	1	8

== Athletics ==
=== Women ===
Field events

Athlete	Event	Qualification		Final	
Athlete	Event	Result	Rank	Result	Rank
Margarida Moreno	High jump	1.70	41	Did not advance	

== Cycling ==
Three male cyclists represented Andorra in 1992.

=== Road ===
Men

Athlete	Event	Time	Rank
Juan González	Road race	Did not finish	
Emili Pérez	Road race	4:58:25	82
Xavier Pérez	Road race	4:35:56	31

== Judo ==
Men

Athlete	Event	Result
Antoni Molne	Extra-Lightweight	=23

== Sailing ==
Men

Athlete	Event	Race							Score	Rank
Athlete	Event	1	2	3	4	5	6	7	Score	Rank
David Ramón; Oscar Ramón	470	21	35	37	33	3	31	(41)	160	27

== Shooting ==
Mixed

Athlete	Events	Qualification		Semifinal		Final		Rank
Athlete	Events	Score	Rank	Score	Rank	Score	Rank	Rank
Joan Besoli	Trap	140	=29	Did not advance				=29
