= Andorra at the 2000 Summer Olympics =

- IOC code: AND
- NOC: Andorran Olympic Committee

in Sydney
- Competitors: 5 (3 men and 2 women) in 3 sports
- Flag bearer: Antoni Bernadó
- Medals: Gold 0 Silver 0 Bronze 0 Total 0

Summer Olympics appearances (overview)
- 1976; 1980; 1984; 1988; 1992; 1996; 2000; 2004; 2008; 2012; 2016; 2020; 2024

Andorra participated at the 2000 Summer Olympics in Sydney, Australia, held between 15 September and 1 October 2000. The country's participation in Sydney marked its seventh appearance at the Summer Olympics since its debut in 1976.

The Andorran team consisted of athletes Antoni Bernadó and Silvia Felipo, shooter Joan Tomàs, and swimmers Santiago Deu and Meritxell Sabaté. Bernadó was the country's flag-bearer during the opening ceremony. Andorra did not win a medal in the Games, and as of these Games, the country had not earned a Summer Olympic medal.

== Background ==
The Andorran Olympic Committee was set up in 1967 and was recognized by the International Olympic Committee in 1975. The nation made its first Summer Olympics appearance at the 1976 Summer Olympics held in Montreal, Canada. This edition of the Games marked the nation's seventh appearance at the Summer Games.

The 2000 Summer Olympics were held in Sydney, Australia held between 15 September and 1 October 2000. The Andorran delegation consisted of five athletes. Antoni Bernadó was the country's flag-bearer in the Parade of Nations during the opening ceremony. Andorra did not win a medal in the Games, and as of these Games, the country had not earned a Summer Olympic medal.

== Competitors ==
There were five athletes who took part in the medal events across three sports.

Sport	Men	Women	Athletes
Athletics	1	1	2
Shooting	1	0	1
Swimming	1	1	2
Total	3	2	5

== Athletics ==
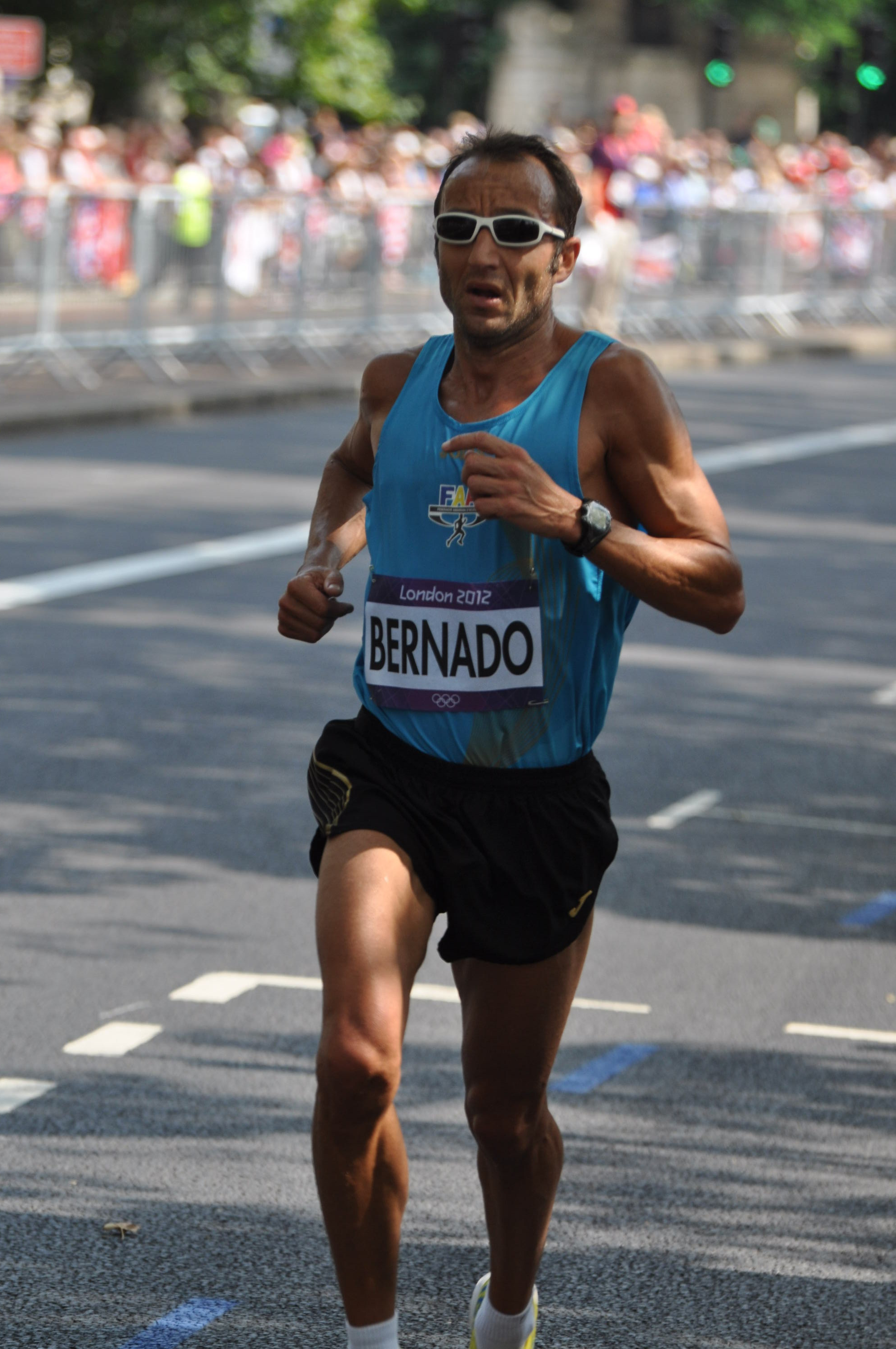
Antoni Bernadó participated in the men's marathon event.

Andorra qualified two athletes for the athletics event at the Games. In the men's marathon, Antoni Bernadó was ranked 49th amongst the 81 finishers with a time of 2:23.03. In the women's 1500 m event, Silvia Felipo finished 13th in the heats and failed to advance to the finals.

Athlete	Event	Heat		Quarterfinal		Semifinal		Final	
Athlete	Event	Time	Rank	Time	Rank	Time	Rank	Time	Rank
Antoni Bernadó	Men's marathon	—N/a						2:23:03	49
Silvia Felipo	Women's 1500 m	4:45.32	13	—N/a		Did not advance			

Note: Ranks given for track events are within the athlete's heat only

== Shooting ==
Andorra qualified one athlete for the sports shooting event at the Games. In the men's trap, Joan Tomàs was ranked 39th and second last with a score of 101 in the qualification event. In the women's 1500 m event, Silvia Felipo finished 13th in the heats and failed to advance to the finals.

Athlete	Event	Qualification		Final		Total	
Athlete	Event	Points	Rank	Points	Rank	Points	Rank
Joan Tomàs	Men's Trap	101	39	Did not advance			

== Swimming ==
Andorra were allocated two quota places for the swimming event at the Games. In the men's 200 m freestyle Santiago Deu was classified 51st and failed to advance to the finals. In the women's medley event, Meritxell Sabaté finished 35th in the heats and failed to advance to the finals.

Athlete	Event	Heat		Semifinal		Final	
Athlete	Event	Time	Rank	Time	Rank	Time	Rank
Santiago Deu	Men's 200 m freestyle	1:59.31	51	Did not advance			
Meritxell Sabaté	Women's 200 metre individual medley	1:59.31	35	—N/a		Did not advance	
