= List of Andorran records in swimming =

The Andorran records in swimming are the fastest ever performances of swimmers from Andorra, which are recognised and ratified by the Federació Andorrana de Natació (FAN).

All records were set in finals unless noted otherwise.

== Long Course (50 m) ==
=== Men ===
Event	Time		Name	Club	Date	Meet	Location	Ref
50 m freestyle	23.13	h	Bernat Lomero	C.N. Lleida	12 April 2022	Spanish Championships	Torremolinos, Spain	
100 m freestyle	50.99	h, †	Bernat Lomero	Andorra	20 June 2024	European Championships	Belgrade, Serbia	
200 m freestyle	1:51.26	h	Biel Cuen Sibila	Andorra	13 August 2026	European Championships	Paris, France	
400 m freestyle	3:56.91	b	Kevin Teixeira	Andorra	5 March 2025	Spanish Spring Championships	Sabadell, Spain	
800 m freestyle	8:12.64		Kevin Teixeira	CN Antibes	29 March 2025	French Southern Region Spring Championships	Saint-Raphaël, France	
1500 m freestyle	15:48.64		Kevin Teixeira	Andorra	7 March 2025	Spanish Spring Championships	Sabadell, Spain	
50m backstroke	27.46	h	Patrick Pelegrina Cuén	Andorra	3 July 2022	Mediterranean Games	Oran, Algeria	
100m backstroke	59.43	b	Patrick Pelegrina Cuén	C.E. Mediterrani	27 March 2026	Catalonia International Open	Terrassa, Spain	
200m backstroke	2:07.54		Biel Cuen Sibila	C.N. Sant Andreu	29 July 2026	CN Sabadell Trophy	Sabadell, Spain	
50m breaststroke	28.30		Patrick Pelegrina Cuén	C.E. Mediterrani	23 February 2024	Spanish Winter Championships	Sabadell, Spain	
100m breaststroke	1:02.27		Patrick Pelegrina Cuén	C.E. Mediterrani	25 February 2024	Spanish Winter Championships	Sabadell, Spain	
200m breaststroke	2:14.47		Hocine Haciane	Andorra	29 June 2009	Mediterranean Games	Pescara, Italy	
50m butterfly	24.33	h	Bernat Lomero Arenas	C.N. Lleida	13 April 2022	Spanish Championships	Torremolinos, Spain	
100m butterfly	55.04	h	Tomas Lomero Arenas	Andorra	23 June 2022	World Championships	Budapest, Hungary	
200m butterfly	2:03.79		Hocine Haciane	Andorra	2 June 2009	Games of the Small States of Europe	Limassol, Cyprus	
200m individual medley	2:05.83		Hocine Haciane	C.E. Mediterrani	22 December 2007	Spanish Championships	Gijón, Spain	
400m individual medley	4:26.19		Hocine Haciane	C.E. Mediterrani	4 April 2008	Spanish Open Championships	Palma de Mallorca, Spain	
4×100m freestyle relay	3:30.80		Bernat Lomero (53.17); Biel Cuen Sibila (51.86); Tomàs Lomero (53.24); Patrick Pelegrina Cuén (52.53)	Andorra	27 May 2025	Games of the Small States of Europe	Andorra la Vella, Andorra	
4×200m freestyle relay	7:52.19		Kevin Teixeira (1:55.96); Patrick Pelegrina Cuén (1:59.92); Biel Cuen Sibila (1:55.68); Aleix Ferriz Vallejo (2:00.63)	Andorra	29 May 2025	Games of the Small States of Europe	Andorra la Vella, Andorra	
4×100m medley relay	3:49.18		Aleix Ferriz Vallejo (59.60); Patrick Pelegrina Cuén (1:02.49); Tomàs Lomero (55.59); Bernat Lomero (51.50)	Andorra	28 May 2025	Games of the Small States of Europe	Andorra la Vella, Andorra	

Legend: # – Record awaiting ratification by FAN; WR – World record; ER – European record; e – equalled existing record;
Records not set in finals: h – heat; sf – semifinal; r – relay 1st leg; rh – relay heat 1st leg; b – B final; † – en route to final mark; so – swim-off; tt – time trial

=== Women ===
Event	Time		Name	Club	Date	Meet	Location	Ref
50m freestyle	26.87		Nadia Tudó	Team Bochum	10 May 2025	Arena Meet Bochum	Bochum, Germany	
100m freestyle	58.54	r	Mònica Ramírez	C.N. Barcelona	5 August 2019	Spanish Summer Championships	Terrassa, Spain	
200m freestyle	2:08.43	r	Nadia Tudó	SV Waiblingen	2 August 2019	German Championships	Berlin, Germany	
400m freestyle	4:30.77		Nadia Tudó	C.E. Serradells	27 April 2018	-	Cleveland, United States	
800m freestyle	9:17.06		Alexandra Mejía Gallego	CN Antibes	29 March 2025	French Southern Region Spring Championships	Saint-Raphaël, France	
1500m freestyle	17:35.72		Alexandra Mejía Gallego	CN Antibes	30 March 2025	French Southern Region Spring Championships	Saint-Raphaël, France	
50m backstroke	30.28		Mònica Ramírez	Andorra	30 May 2019	Games of the Small States of Europe	Podgorica, Montenegro	
100m backstroke	1:03.79	h	Mònica Ramírez	Andorra	27 July 2009	World Championships	Rome, Italy	
200m backstroke	2:20.39		Mònica Ramírez	C.N. Escaldes	5 July 2009	-	Sabadell, Spain	
50m breaststroke	33.00	h	Nadia Tudo	Andorra	27 May 2025	Games of the Small States of Europe	Andorra la Vella, Andorra	
100m breaststroke	1:11.18		Nadia Tudo	Team Bochum	2 May 2025	German Championships	Berlin, Germany	
200m breaststroke	2:33.19	b	Nadia Tudo	SG Ruhr	28 April 2024	German Championships	Berlin, Germany	
50m butterfly	29.27		Nadia Tudó	Team Bochum	10 May 2025	Arena Meet Bochum	Bochum, Germany	
100m butterfly	1:06.01		Carolina Cerqueda	S.E. Serradells	26 July 2001	-	Lleida, Spain	
200m butterfly	2:29.18		Silvia Ribes Sabate	S.E. Serradells	9 July 2010	-	Sabadell, Spain	
200m individual medley	2:21.74		Nadia Tudo	Andorra	30 May 2023	Games of the Small States of Europe	Msida, Malta	
400m individual medley	5:03.59		Meritxell Sabaté	C.E. Serradells	22 July 2000	-		
4×100m freestyle relay	4:00.52		Lea Ricart Martínez (1:00.23); Laia Rodriguez Jareño (1:01.02); Nadia Tudo Cubells (1:00.46); Mònica Ramírez (58.81)	Andorra	2 June 2017	Games of the Small States of Europe	Serravalle, San Marino	
4×200m freestyle relay	9:05.79		L Haciane; Carolina Cerqueda; T. Salles; Meritxell Sabaté	Andorra	27 May 1999	Games of the Small States of Europe	Vaduz, Liechtenstein	
4×100m medley relay	4:45.91		M. Canlas; J. Romero; Carolina Cerqueda; Meritxell Sabaté	Andorra	28 May 1999	Games of the Small States of Europe	Vaduz, Liechtenstein	

=== Mixed relay ===
Event	Time		Name	Club	Date	Meet	Location	Ref
4×100 m freestyle relay	3:43.57	h	Tomás Lomero (52.58); Bernat Lomero (52.30); Nàdia Tudó (1:00.10); Mònica Ramírez (58.59)	Andorra	22 May 2021	European Championships	Budapest, Hungary	
4×100 m medley relay	4:10.01	h	Mònica Ramírez (1:06.01); Nàdia Tudó (1:14.91); Bernat Lomero (56.96); Tomàs Lomero (52.13)	Andorra	20 May 2021	European Championships	Budapest, Hungary	

Legend: # – Record awaiting ratification by FAN; WR – World record; ER – European record; e – equalled existing record;
Records not set in finals: h – heat; sf – semifinal; r – relay 1st leg; rh – relay heat 1st leg; b – B final; † – en route to final mark; so – swim-off; tt – time trial

== Short Course (25 m) ==
=== Men ===
Event	Time		Name	Club	Date	Meet	Location	Ref
50 m freestyle	22.64	r	Bernat Lomero Arenas	C.N. Lleida	21 December 2023	Spanish Club Cup First Division	Castellón de la Plana, Spain	
100 m freestyle	50.32	h	Tomas Lomero Arenas	Andorra	14 December 2022	World Championships	Melbourne, Australia	
200 m freestyle	1:48.59	h	Biel Cuen Sibila	C.N. Sant Andreu	15 November 2026	Spanish Championships	Madrid, Spain	
400 m freestyle	3:49.79		Biel Cuen Sibila	C.N. Sant Andreu	12 November 2026	Spanish Championships	Madrid, Spain	
800 m freestyle	7:56.29		Biel Cuen Sibila	C.N. Sant Andreu	20 December 2025	Spanish Club Cup Division of Honor	Sabadell, Spain	
1500 m freestyle	15:18.42		Biel Cuen Sibila	C.N. Sant Andreu	19 December 2025	Spanish Club Cup Division of Honor	Sabadell, Spain	
50 m backstroke	26.52	h	Patrick Pelegrina Cuén	C.E. Mediterrani	14 November 2024	Spanish Championships	Madrid, Spain	
100 m backstroke	56.66	r	Aleix Ferriz Vallejo	C.N. Mataró	22 December 2024	Spanish Club Cup First Division	Castellón de la Plana, Spain	
200 m backstroke	2:02.84	h	Biel Cuen Sibila	C.N. Sant Andreu	29 July 2026	CN Sabadell Trophy	Sabadell, Spain	
50m breaststroke	27.16		Patrick Pelegrina Cuén	C.E. Mediterrani	22 December 2023	Spanish Club Cup First Division	Castellón de la Plana, Spain	
100m breaststroke	59.27		Patrick Pelegrina Cuén	C.E. Mediterrani	20 December 2023	Spanish Club Cup First Division	Castellón de la Plana, Spain	
200m breaststroke	2:09.61	h	Hocine Haciane	C.E. Mediterrani	27 November 2009	Spanish Championships	Castellón, Spain	
50m butterfly	23.97	h	Tomas Lomero Arenas	Andorra	19 December 2021	World Championships	Abu Dhabi, United Arab Emirates	
100m butterfly	53.73		Tomas Lomero Arenas	C.N. Sant Andreu	22 December 2023	Spanish Club Cup Division of Honor	Barcelona, Spain	
200m butterfly	1:59.21	h	Hocine Haciane	C.E. Mediterrani	26 November 2009	Spanish Championships	Castellón, Spain	
100m individual medley	55.36 (Note: by official result source; 55.35 by FAN source, a typo)	b	Patrick Pelegrina Cuén	C.E. Mediterrani	13 November 2026	Spanish Championships	Madrid, Spain	
200m individual medley	2:01.66		Hocine Haciane	C.E. Serradells	15 December 2005	Spanish Championships	Palma de Mallorca, Spain	
400m individual medley	4:16.34		Hocine Haciane	C.E. Serradells	17 December 2005	Spanish Championships	Palma de Mallorca, Spain	
4×50m freestyle relay	1:41.23		Carles Ridaura; Marc Catarino; Ivan Grougnet; Santiago Deu	Andorra	5 February 1999	-	L'Hospitalet de Llobregat, Spain	
4×100m freestyle relay	3:42.07		Santiago Deu; Aitor Osorio; Enric Claret; Carles Ridaura	Andorra	6 February 1999	-	Banyoles, Spain	
4×200m freestyle relay	8:03.28		Enric Claret; Aitor Osorio; Santiago Deu; Carles Ridaura	Andorra	6 February 1999	-	Banyoles, Spain	
4×50m medley relay	1:42.87		Aleix Ferriz; Patrick Pelegrina; Tomas Lomero; Bernat Lomero	Andorra	27 March 2021	-	Encamp, Andorra	
4×100m medley relay	4:04.13		Santiago Deu; D. Ferrer; Aitor Osorio; Carles Ridaura	Andorra	7 February 1999	-	Banyoles, Spain	

Legend: # – Record awaiting ratification by FAN; WR – World record; ER – European record; e – equalled existing record;
Records not set in finals: h – heat; sf – semifinal; r – relay 1st leg; rh – relay heat 1st leg; b – B final; † – en route to final mark; so – swim-off; tt – time trial

=== Women ===
Event	Time		Name	Club	Date	Meet	Location	Ref
50m freestyle	26.65	h	Mònica Ramírez	Andorra	8 December 2019	European Championships	Glasgow, Great Britain	
100m freestyle	57.67	h	Mònica Ramírez	C.N. Escaldes	4 December 2014	World Championships	Doha, Qatar	
200m freestyle	2:04.55	h	Mònica Ramírez	Andorra	7 December 2019	European Championships	Glasgow, Great Britain	
400m freestyle	4:25.22		Alexandra Mejía Gallego	CN Antibes	17 November 2024	Interclub All Categories - South Region - Group B	Hyères, France	
800m freestyle	9:07.97		Alexandra Mejía Gallego	CN Antibes	5 December 2024	French Junior Championships	Massy, France	
1500m freestyle	17:33.41		Alexandra Mejía Gallego	Aas Sarcelles Natation 95	9 December 2023	French Junior Championships	Montlucon, France	
50m backstroke	29.28	h	Mònica Ramírez	Andorra	14 December 2018	World Championships	Hangzhou, China	
100m backstroke	1:02.39	h	Mònica Ramírez	S.N. Escaldes	26 November 2009	Spanish Championships	Castellón, Spain	
200m backstroke	2:16.16	h	Mònica Ramírez	S.N. Escaldes	29 November 2009	Spanish Championships	Castellón, Spain	
50m breaststroke	32.88	h, †	Nadia Tudó	Andorra	11 December 2024	World Championships	Budapest, Hungary	
100m breaststroke	1:09.67	h	Nadia Tudó	SV Waiblingen	14 November 2019	German Championships	Berlin, Germany	
200m breaststroke	2:29.32		Nadia Tudó	Sport-Union Neckarsulm	5 February 2023	German Team Championships	Essen, Germany	
50m butterfly	29.35		Nadia Tudó	SV Waiblingen	6 July 2019	2. Summer Finals	Waiblingen, Germany	
100m butterfly	1:05.62		Nadia Tudó	SV Waiblingen	7 July 2019	2. Summer Finals	Waiblingen, Germany	
200m butterfly	2:25.03		Nadia Tudó	C.N. Barcelona	30 January 2021	-	Barcelona, Spain	
100m individual medley	1:04.53	h	Nadia Tudó	Andorra	5 December 2019	European Championships	Glasgow, Great Britain	
200m individual medley	2:19.71		Nadia Tudó	SV Waiblingen	2 February 2020	DMS der Oberliga Baden-Wuerttemberg	Waiblingen, Germany	
400m individual medley	4:54.14		Nadia Tudó	Sport-Union Neckarsulm	5 February 2023	German Team Championships	Essen, Germany	
4×50m freestyle relay	1:55.61							
4×100m freestyle relay	4:08.15							
4×200m freestyle relay	9:03.82							
4×50m medley relay	2:11.41							
4×100m medley relay	4:33.50							

Legend: # – Record awaiting ratification by FAN; WR – World record; ER – European record; e – equalled existing record;
Records not set in finals: h – heat; sf – semifinal; r – relay 1st leg; rh – relay heat 1st leg; b – B final; † – en route to final mark; so – swim-off; tt – time trial

=== Mixed relay ===
Event	Time		Name	Nationality	Date	Meet	Location	Ref
4×50 m freestyle relay	1:39.90	h	Tomàs Lomero (23.10); Patrick Pelegrina (23.27); Mònica Ramírez (26.72); Nàdia Tudó (26.81)	Andorra	17 December 2021	World Championships	Abu Dhabi, United Arab Emirates	
4×100 m freestyle relay								
4×50 m medley relay	1:48.79	h	Mònica Ramírez (30.04); Patrick Pelegrina (28.29); Tomàs Lomero (23.56); Nàdia Tudó (26.90)	Andorra	18 December 2021	World Championships	Abu Dhabi, United Arab Emirates	
4×100 m medley relay	4:27.94			-	20 May 2017	-	Les Escaldes, Andorra	

Legend: # – Record awaiting ratification by FAN; WR – World record; ER – European record; e – equalled existing record;
Records not set in finals: h – heat; † – en route to final mark; so – swim-off
