= Andorra at the 1988 Summer Olympics =

- IOC code: AND
- NOC: Andorran Olympic Committee
- Website: no link present

in Seoul
- Competitors: 3 (3 men and 0 women) in 2 sports
- Flag bearer: Josep Graells
- Medals: Gold 0 Silver 0 Bronze 0 Total 0

Summer Olympics appearances (overview)
- 1976; 1980; 1984; 1988; 1992; 1996; 2000; 2004; 2008; 2012; 2016; 2020; 2024

Andorra competed at the 1988 Summer Olympics in Seoul, South Korea. Three competitors, all men, took part in three events in two sports.

== Competitors ==
The following is the list of number of competitors in the Games.

Sport	Men	Women	Total
Athletics	1	0	1
Cycling	2	0	2
Total	3	0	3

== Athletics ==
Key

- Note–Ranks given for track events are within the athlete's heat only
- Q = Qualified for the next round
- q = Qualified for the next round as a fastest loser or, in field events, by position without achieving the qualifying target
- NR = National record
- N/A = Round not applicable for the event
- Bye = Athlete not required to compete in round

Men
Track & road events

Athlete	Event	Heat		Quarterfinal		Semifinal		Final	
Athlete	Event	Result	Rank	Result	Rank	Result	Rank	Result	Rank
Josep Graells	800 m	1:53.34	7	did not advance					
Josep Graells	1500 m	3:52.68	11	—N/a		did not advance			

== Cycling ==
Two cyclists represented Andorra in 1988.

Men

Athlete	Event	Time	Rank
Emili Pérez	Individual road race	4-32:46	9
Xavier Pérez	Individual road race	4-32:56	59
