= Andorra at the 2008 Summer Olympics =

- IOC code: AND
- NOC: Andorran Olympic Committee

in Beijing
- Competitors: 5 in 4 sports
- Flag bearer: Montserrat García Riberaygua
- Medals: Gold 0 Silver 0 Bronze 0 Total 0

Summer Olympics appearances (overview)
- 1976; 1980; 1984; 1988; 1992; 1996; 2000; 2004; 2008; 2012; 2016; 2020; 2024; 2028

Andorra, represented by the Andorran Olympic Committee, sent a team of five athletes to compete at the 2008 Summer Olympics in Beijing, China.

== Athletics ==
Two Andorran athletes participated in the athletics events – Antoni Bernadó in the men's marathon and Montserrat Pujol in the women's 100 m.

The heats for the women's 100 m took place on 16 August 2008. Pujol contested heat six which took place at 11:25 am. She finished seventh of nine starts in a time of 12.73 seconds and failed to advance to the semi-finals.

The men's marathon took place eight days later on 24 August 2008 at 7:30 am. Bernadó completed the race in a time of 2 hours, 26 minutes and 29 seconds to finish 58th overall.

Men

Athlete	Event	Final	
Athlete	Event	Result	Rank
Antoni Bernadó	Marathon	2:26:29	58

Women

Athlete	Event	Heat		Quarterfinal		Semifinal		Final	
Athlete	Event	Result	Rank	Result	Rank	Result	Rank	Result	Rank
Montserrat Pujol	100 m	12.73	7	did not advance					

== Canoeing ==
One Andorran athlete participated in the canoeing events – Montserrat García Riberaygua in the women's slalom K-1.

The preliminary round for the women's slalom K-1 was held on 13 August 2008. Over two runs, García Riberaygua's total time was 268.93 seconds as she placed 20th of the 21 competitors and was eliminated from the competition.

Athlete	Event	Preliminary						Semifinal		Final			
Athlete	Event	Run 1	Rank	Run 2	Rank	Total	Rank	Time	Rank	Time	Rank	Total	Rank
Montserrat García Riberaygua	Women's K-1	166.67	21	102.26	11	268.93	20	did not advance					

== Judo ==
One Andorran athlete participated in the judo events – Daniel García in the men's −66 kg.

The men's −66 kg event took place on 10 August 2008. García received a bye in the preliminary round but lost by ippon to Yordanis Arencibia of Cuba in the round of 32. In the repechage contest, García lost by ippon to Amin El Hady of Egypt.

Athlete	Event	Preliminary	Round of 32	Round of 16	Quarterfinals	Semifinals	Repechage 1	Repechage 2	Repechage 3	Final / BM	
Athlete	Event	Opposition Result	Opposition Result	Opposition Result	Opposition Result	Opposition Result	Opposition Result	Opposition Result	Opposition Result	Opposition Result	Rank
Daniel García	Men's −66 kg	Bye	Arencibia (CUB); L 0000–1010	did not advance				El Hady (EGY); L 0001–1001	did not advance		

== Swimming ==
One Andorran athlete participated in the swimming events – Hocine Haciane in the men's 400 m individual medley.

The heats for the men's 400 m individual medley took place on 9 August 2008 at 11:33 am. Haciane contested heat five and started in lane five. He finished first in his heat in a time of 4 minutes and 32 seconds which was ultimately not fast enough to qualify for the final.

Men

Athlete	Event	Heat		Final	
Athlete	Event	Time	Rank	Time	Rank
Hocine Haciane	400 m individual medley	4:32.00	29	did not advance	
