= Andorra at the 2012 Summer Olympics =

- IOC code: AND
- NOC: Andorran Olympic Committee

in London
- Competitors: 6 in 4 sports
- Flag bearers: Joan Tomàs Roca (opening); Antoni Bernadó (closing)
- Medals: Gold 0 Silver 0 Bronze 0 Total 0

Summer Olympics appearances (overview)
- 1976; 1980; 1984; 1988; 1992; 1996; 2000; 2004; 2008; 2012; 2016; 2020; 2024

Andorra competed at the 2012 Summer Olympics in London, United Kingdom from 27 July to 12 August 2012. This nation marked its tenth appearance at the Olympic games.

The Andorra Olympic Committee (Catalan: Comitè Olímpic Andorrà) sent a total of six athletes to the Games, sharing the same record, both by gender and by overall, with Athens. Sprinter Cristina Llovera was the youngest athlete of the team, at age 15. Meanwhile, trap shooter Joan Tomàs Roca, the oldest of the team at age 61, competed at his fifth Olympics since its national debut in Montreal. For being the team's most experienced member, Roca was appointed by the committee to be the nation's flag bearer at the opening ceremony. Andorra, however, has yet to win its first Olympic medal.

== Athletics ==
Andorran athletes have so far achieved qualifying standards in the following athletics events (up to a maximum of 3 athletes in each event at the 'A' Standard, and 1 at the 'B' Standard):

Key

- Note–Ranks given for track events are within the athlete's heat only
- Q = Qualified for the next round
- q = Qualified for the next round as a fastest loser or, in field events, by position without achieving the qualifying target
- NR = National record
- N/A = Round not applicable for the event
- Bye = Athlete not required to compete in round

Men

Athlete	Event	Final	
Athlete	Event	Result	Rank
Antoni Bernadó	Marathon	2:28:34	74

Women

Athlete	Event	Heat		Quarterfinal		Semifinal		Final	
Athlete	Event	Result	Rank	Result	Rank	Result	Rank	Result	Rank
Cristina Llovera	100 m	12.78	5	did not advance					

== Judo ==
Andorra has qualified 1 judoka.

Athlete	Event	Round of 64	Round of 32	Round of 16	Quarterfinals	Semifinals	Repechage	Final / BM	
Athlete	Event	Opposition Result	Opposition Result	Opposition Result	Opposition Result	Opposition Result	Opposition Result	Opposition Result	Rank
Daniel García	Men's −66 kg	Bye	Acevedo (PAR); W 0020–0001	Uriarte (ESP); L 0002–0013	did not advance				

== Shooting ==
Men

Athlete	Event	Qualification		Final	
Athlete	Event	Points	Rank	Points	Rank
Joan Tomàs Roca	Trap	103	33	did not advance	

== Swimming ==
Men

Athlete	Event	Heat		Semifinal		Final	
Athlete	Event	Time	Rank	Time	Rank	Time	Rank
Hocine Haciane	200 m butterfly	2:06.37	37	did not advance			

Women

Athlete	Event	Heat		Semifinal		Final	
Athlete	Event	Time	Rank	Time	Rank	Time	Rank
Mónica Ramírez	100 m backstroke	1:07.72	42	did not advance			
