= Andorra at the 1976 Summer Olympics =

- IOC code: AND
- NOC: Andorran Olympic Committee

in Montreal
- Competitors: 3 (3 men and 0 women) in 2 sports
- Flag bearer: Esteve Dolsa
- Medals: Gold 0 Silver 0 Bronze 0 Total 0

Summer Olympics appearances (overview)
- 1976; 1980; 1984; 1988; 1992; 1996; 2000; 2004; 2008; 2012; 2016; 2020; 2024; 2028

Andorra first competed in the Summer Olympic Games at the 1976 Summer Olympics in Montreal, Quebec, Canada.

== Boxing ==
Athlete	Event	Round of 32	Round of 16	Quarterfinals	Semifinals	Final	
Athlete	Event	Opposition Result	Opposition Result	Opposition Result	Opposition Result	Opposition Result	Rank
Joan Montane	Light heavyweight	Walkover	Sachse (GDR); L	did not advance			9

== Shooting ==
Athlete	Event	Final	
Athlete	Event	Points	Rank
Joan Tomàs Roca	Trap	162	33
Esteve Dolsa	Trap	159	35T
