= Andorra at the 1984 Summer Olympics =

- IOC code: AND
- NOC: Andorran Olympic Committee

in Los Angeles
- Competitors: 2 (2 men and 0 women) in 1 sport
- Flag bearer: Joan Tomas
- Medals: Gold 0 Silver 0 Bronze 0 Total 0

Summer Olympics appearances (overview)
- 1976; 1980; 1984; 1988; 1992; 1996; 2000; 2004; 2008; 2012; 2016; 2020; 2024

Andorra competed at the 1984 Summer Olympics in Los Angeles, United States This was Andorra's third participation at the Summer Olympic Games, after its apparition in 1976 in Montreal (Canada) and in 1980 in Moscow (USSR). Two Andorran athletes, both shooters, were selected and participated: Joan Tomàs Roca (who has also flag bearer during the opening ceremony) and Francesc Gaset Fris.

== Shooting ==
Athlete	Event	Final	
Athlete	Event	Points	Rank
Joan Tomàs Roca	Mixed trap	180	26T
Francesc Gaset Fris	Mixed trap	179	28T
