= Andorran Athletics Championships =

National athletics competition

- Sport: Track and field
- Country: Andorra

The Andorran Athletics Championships is an annual outdoor track and field competition organised by the Andorran Athletics Federation, which serves as the national championship for the sport in Andorra.

== Events ==
The competition programme varies depending on the level of participation and several globally common athletics events are typically missing from the programme due to a lack of entries or organisational limitations. Unlike most national outdoor competitions, Andorran runners contest the 3000 metres rather than 5000 metres distance. Below are the events regularly held at the competition:

Track running

- 100 metres, 200 metres, 400 metres, 800 metres, 1500 metres, 3000 metres

Distance running

- 10K run, half marathon, cross country running

Obstacle events

- 100 metres hurdles (women only), 400 metres hurdles

Jumping events

- Pole vault, high jump, long jump

Throwing events

- Shot put, discus throw, javelin throw, hammer throw

== Championships records ==
=== Men ===
Event	Record	Athlete/Team	Date	Place	Ref.
200 m	21.89 (+2.0 m/s) NR	Guillem Arderiu Vilanova	30 March 2025	Andorra la Vella	

== Men's champions ==
=== 100 metres ===
- 2001: Javier Rodríguez
- 2002: Sergi Vidal
- 2003: Patrick Montané
- 2004: Oriol Guillem
- 2005: Oriol Guillem
- 2006: Oriol Guillem

=== 200 metres ===
- 2001: Javier Rodríguez
- 2002: Sergi Vidal
- 2003: Javier Rodríguez
- 2004: Oriol Guillem
- 2005: Bernat Villela
- 2006: Ángel Miret

=== 400 metres ===
- 2001: Jordi Martínez
- 2002: Farid Arrahaoui
- 2003: Víctor Martínez
- 2004: Sergi Vidal
- 2005: Víctor Martínez
- 2006: Eric Rossell

=== 800 metres ===
- 2001: Víctor Martínez
- 2002: Josep Sansa
- 2003: Daniel Maciel
- 2004: Víctor Martínez
- 2005: Josep Graells
- 2006: Víctor Martínez

=== 1500 metres ===
- 2001: Pere Cornella
- 2002: Antoni Bernadó
- 2003: Pere Cornella
- 2004: Antoni Bernadó
- 2005: Josep Sansa
- 2006: Antoni Bernadó

=== 3000 metres ===
- 2003: Antoni Bernadó
- 2004: Antoni Bernadó
- 2005: Antoni Bernadó
- 2006: Antoni Bernadó

=== 5000 metres ===
- 2001: Manuel Fernandes
- 2002: Antoni Bernadó

=== 10K run ===
- 2001: Antoni Bernadó
- 2002: ?
- 2003: Antoni Bernadó
- 2004: Antoni Bernadó
- 2005: Antoni Bernadó

=== Half marathon ===
- 2001: Antoni Bernadó
- 2002: Alonso López
- 2003: Josep Sansa
- 2004: Not held
- 2005: Antoni Bernadó

=== 400 metres hurdles ===
- 2002: Jordi Martínez
- 2003: Not held
- 2004: Not held
- 2005: Marc Medina
- 2006: Marc Medina

=== High jump ===
- 2001: Óscar Chinchilla
- 2002: Óscar Chinchilla
- 2003: Bernat Vilella
- 2004: Esteve Martín
- 2005: Esteve Martín
- 2006: Oriol Guillem

=== Pole vault ===
- 2001: Xavier Consegal
- 2002: Xavier Consegal
- 2003: Bernat Vilella
- 2004: Bernat Vilella
- 2005: Robert Aleu
- 2006: Bernat Vilella

=== Long jump ===
- 2001: Óscar Chinchilla
- 2002: Óscar Chinchilla
- 2003: Patrick Montané
- 2004: Esteve Martín
- 2005: Ángel Miret
- 2006: Not held

=== Triple jump ===
- 2001: Xavier Consegal
- 2002: Jordi Raya
- 2003: Not held
- 2004: Not held
- 2005: Not held
- 2006: Not held

=== Shot put ===
- 2001: Unai Olea
- 2002: Ángel Moreno
- 2003: Not held
- 2004: Joan Fernández
- 2005: Carlos Queirós
- 2006: Carlos Queirós

=== Discus throw ===
- 2001: Ángel Moreno
- 2002: Ángel Moreno
- 2003: Ángel Moreno
- 2004: Ángel Moreno
- 2005: Ángel Moreno
- 2006: Carlos Queirós

=== Hammer throw ===
- 2001: Joan Valls
- 2002: Joan Valls
- 2003: Not held
- 2004: Not held
- 2005: Not held
- 2006: Joan Valls

=== Javelin throw ===
- 2001: Adrià Pérez
- 2002: Adrià Pérez
- 2003: Adrià Pérez
- 2004: Adrià Pérez
- 2005: Carlos Queirós
- 2006: Adrià Pérez

=== Cross country ===
- 2001: Antoni Bernadó
- 2002: Joan Ramón Moya
- 2003: Víctor Martínez
- 2004: Joan Ramón Moya
- 2005: Antoni Bernadó
- 2006: Antoni Bernadó

== Women's champions ==
=== 100 metres ===
- 2001: Montserrat Pujol
- 2002: Roser Mazón
- 2003: Sara Guerra
- 2004: Montserrat Pujol
- 2005: Carmen Fernández
- 2006: Montserrat Pujol

=== 200 metres ===
- 2001: Carme Domenjó
- 2002: Imma Sabaté
- 2003: Sónia González
- 2004: Sara Guerra
- 2005: Roser Mazón
- 2006: Sónia Villacampa

=== 400 metres ===
- 2001: Not held
- 2002: Eva Iglesias
- 2003: Imma Sabaté
- 2004: Sílvia Rossell
- 2005: Roser Mazón
- 2006: Natàlia Gallego

=== 800 metres ===
- 2001: María Betriu
- 2002: Eva Iglesias
- 2003: Sílvia Felipo
- 2004: Eva Iglesias
- 2005: Natàlia Gallego
- 2006: Natàlia Gallego

=== 1500 metres ===
- 2001: María Betriu
- 2002: Sílvia Felipo
- 2003: Sílvia Felipo
- 2004: no finishers
- 2005: Not held
- 2006: Natàlia Gallego

=== 3000 metres ===
- 2002: Sílvia Felipo
- 2003: Sílvia Felipo
- 2004: Not held
- 2005: Not held
- 2006: Natàlia Gallego

=== 5000 metres ===
- 2001: María Betriu

=== 10K run ===
- 2001: Estefanía Jiménez
- 2002: ?
- 2003: Eva Iglesias
- 2004: Not held
- 2005: Gemma Reig

=== Half marathon ===
- 2001: Eva Iglesias
- 2002: María Betriu
- 2003: María Betriu
- 2004: Not held
- 2005: Estefanía Jiménez

=== 2000 metres steeplechase ===
- 2005: Gemma Iglesias

=== 100 metres hurdles ===
- 2001: Not held
- 2002: Montserrat Pujol
- 2003: Not held
- 2004: Not held
- 2005: Not held
- 2006: Montserrat Pujol

=== 400 metres hurdles ===
- 2001: Not held
- 2002: Elsa Santos
- 2003: Elsa Santos
- 2004: no finishers
- 2005: Not held
- 2006: Dina Chiguen

=== High jump ===
- 2001: Nerea Coto
- 2002: Montserrat Pujol
- 2003: Montserrat Pujol
- 2004: Margarida Moreno
- 2005: Margarida Moreno
- 2006: Margarida Moreno

=== Pole vault ===
- 2001: Laura Rossell
- 2002: Laura Rossell
- 2003: Laura Rossell
- 2004: María Martínez
- 2005: María Martínez
- 2006: Barbara Coma

=== Long jump ===
- 2001: Montserrat Pujol
- 2002: Vicky Barberà
- 2003: Montserrat Pujol
- 2004: Montserrat Pujol
- 2005: Montserrat Pujol
- 2006: Not held

=== Triple jump ===
- 2001: Vicky Barberà
- 2002: Montserrat Pujol
- 2003: Montserrat Pujol
- 2004: Montserrat Pujol
- 2005: Montserrat Pujol
- 2006: Not held

=== Shot put ===
- 2001: Montserrat Pujol
- 2002: Lorena Álvarez
- 2003: Not held
- 2004: Joana Santamaría
- 2005: Lorena Álvarez
- 2006: Lorena Álvarez

=== Discus throw ===
- 2001: Not held
- 2002: Elena Villalón
- 2003: Elena Villalón
- 2004: Joana Santamaría
- 2005: Not held
- 2006: Elena Villalón

=== Hammer throw ===
- 2001: Elena Villalón
- 2002: Tania González
- 2003: Elena Villalón
- 2004: Elena Villalón
- 2005: Elena Villalón
- 2006: Elena Villalón

=== Javelin throw ===
- 2001: Not held
- 2002: Vicky Barberà
- 2003: Not held
- 2004: Not held
- 2005: Laura Rossell
- 2006: Montserrat Pujol

=== Cross country ===
- 2001: María Betriu
- 2002: María Betriu
- 2003: Estefanía Jiménez
- 2004: Eva Iglesias
- 2005: Eva Iglesias
- 2006: Eva Iglesias
