= Andorra at the 1980 Summer Olympics =

- IOC code: AND
- NOC: Andorran Olympic Committee

in Moscow
- Competitors: 2 (2 men and 0 women) in 1 sport
- Flag bearer: Francesc Gaset Fris
- Medals: Gold 0 Silver 0 Bronze 0 Total 0

Summer Olympics appearances (overview)
- 1976; 1980; 1984; 1988; 1992; 1996; 2000; 2004; 2008; 2012; 2016; 2020; 2024

Andorra competed at the 1980 Summer Olympics in Moscow, USSR. In partial support of the American-led boycott of the 1980 Summer Olympics, Andorra competed under the Olympic Flag instead of its national flag.

== Shooting ==
Athlete	Event	Final	
Athlete	Event	Points	Rank
Francesc Gaset Fris	Mixed trap	184	24
Joan Tomàs Roca	Mixed trap	181	26T
