= FAV =

FAV may refer to:

- Film-animation-video, a combination of film studies disciplines
- An alternate spelling of "fave," short for favourite
- Fabrikarbeiterverband, a defunct German trade union
- Fakarava Airport, in French Polynesia
- Fast Attack Vehicle
- Fav peninsula, in Iraq
- Faversham railway station, in England
- Andorran Sailing Federation (Catalan: Federació Andorrana de Vela)
- Venezuelan Air Force (Spanish: Fuerza Aérea Venezolana)
- A slang Internet acronym meaning Forever a virgin
