= Victor Gómez =

Victor Gómez may refer to:

- Victor Gómez (alpine skier) (born 1974), Andorran skier (Victor Gómez Javalera)
- Víctor Gómez (footballer) (born 2000), Spanish footballer (Víctor Gómez Perea)

== See also ==
- Victor Gomes (born 1982), South African football referee (Victor Miguel de Freitas Gomes)
