= Sözeri =

Sözeri (IPA: [sœˈzeːri], literally "man (Turkish: er (definite accusative eri)) of the word (Turkish: söz)") is a Turkish surname and may refer to:

- Ayşe Sözeri (1974), Turkish windsurfer
- Ayta Sözeri (1976), Turkish actress and singer
- Erkan Sözeri (1966), Turkish football manager and former player
