= Joan Tomàs =

Joan Tomàs may refer to:

- Joan Tomàs (footballer) (born 1985), Spanish footballer
- Joan Tomàs (sport shooter) (born 1951), Andorran sport shooter
