= Andorra at the 2004 Summer Olympics =

- IOC code: AND
- NOC: Andorran Olympic Committee

in Athens
- Competitors: 6 in 4 sports
- Flag bearer: Hocine Haciane
- Medals: Gold 0 Silver 0 Bronze 0 Total 0

Summer Olympics appearances (overview)
- 1976; 1980; 1984; 1988; 1992; 1996; 2000; 2004; 2008; 2012; 2016; 2020; 2024

Andorra competed at the 2004 Summer Olympics in Athens, Greece from 13 to 29 August 2004.

== Athletics ==
Andorran athletes have so far achieved qualifying standards in the following athletics events (up to a maximum of 3 athletes in each event at the 'A' Standard, and 1 at the 'B' Standard).

Key

- Note–Ranks given for track events are within the athlete's heat only
- Q = Qualified for the next round
- q = Qualified for the next round as a fastest loser or, in field events, by position without achieving the qualifying target
- NR = National record
- N/A = Round not applicable for the event
- Bye = Athlete not required to compete in round

Men

Athlete	Event	Final	
Athlete	Event	Result	Rank
Antoni Bernadó	Marathon	2:23:55	57

Women

Athlete	Event	Heat		Semifinal		Final	
Athlete	Event	Result	Rank	Result	Rank	Result	Rank
Silvia Felipo	1500 m	4:44.40	13	did not advance			

== Judo ==
Andorra sent one competitor to the Olympic Games in Judo.

Athlete	Event	Round of 32	Round of 16	Quarterfinals	Semifinals	Repechage 1	Repechage 2	Repechage 3	Final / BM	
Athlete	Event	Opposition Result	Opposition Result	Opposition Result	Opposition Result	Opposition Result	Opposition Result	Opposition Result	Opposition Result	Rank
Toni Besolí	Men's −90 kg	Geraldino (DOM); L 0000–1000	did not advance							

== Shooting ==
Andorra sent one competitor to the Olympic Games in shooting.

Men

Athlete	Event	Qualification		Final	
Athlete	Event	Points	Rank	Points	Rank
Francesc Repiso Romero	Trap	106	35	did not advance	

== Swimming ==
Andorra sent two competitors to the Olympic games in swimming.

Men

Athlete	Event	Heat		Semifinal		Final	
Athlete	Event	Time	Rank	Time	Rank	Time	Rank
Hocine Haciane	200 m individual medley	2:06.48	36	did not advance			

Women

Athlete	Event	Heat		Semifinal		Final	
Athlete	Event	Time	Rank	Time	Rank	Time	Rank
Carolina Cerqueda	100 m freestyle	1:00.38	48	did not advance			
