= Mónica Fechino =

Argentine windsurfer

Personal information
- Birth name: Mónica Fechino Wilson
- Born: 18 February 1967 (age 58); Buenos Aires, Argentina
- Height: 160 cm (5 ft 3 in)
- Weight: 52 kg (115 lb; 8 st 3 lb)

Sport
- Sport: Windsurfing

Mónica Fechino Wilson (born 18 February 1967) is an Argentine windsurfer. She competed in the women's one design mistral event at the 1996 Summer Olympics.
