= Cathleen Moore-Linn =

Guamanian windsurfer

Personal information
- Born: 9 July 1961 (age 64)

Sport
- Country: Guam
- Sport: Windsurfing

Cathleen Moore-Linn (born 9 July 1961) is a Guamanian windsurfer. She competed in the women's mistral one design event at the 1996 Summer Olympics.
