= Mònica Dòria =

Slalom canoeist

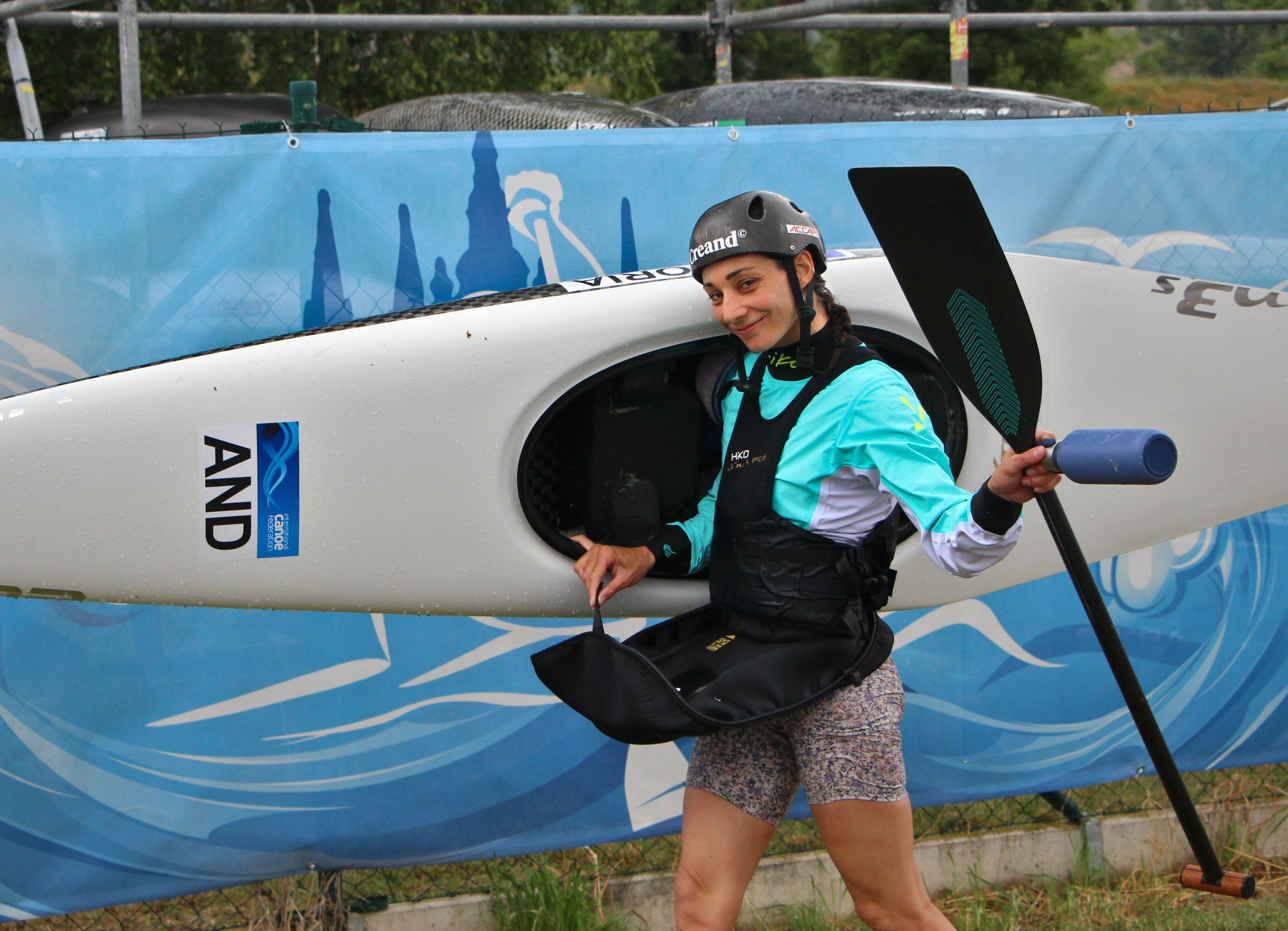
- Dòria in 2023

Personal information
- Nationality: Andorran
- Born: Mònica Dòria Vilarrubla; 4 December 1999 (age 26) La Seu d'Urgell, Spain

Sport
- Country: Andorra
- Sport: Canoe slalom
- Event: C1, K1, Kayak cross
Medal record
Women's canoe slalom
Representing Andorra
World Championships
Silver medal – second place	2026 Oklahoma City	C1
Bronze medal – third place	2022 Augsburg	Kayak cross
European Championships
Gold medal – first place	2025 Vaires-sur-Marne	C1
U23 World Championships
Bronze medal – third place	2022 Ivrea	K1
Bronze medal – third place	2022 Ivrea	Kayak cross
U23 European Championships
Bronze medal – third place	2021 Solkan	C1
Junior European Championships
Gold medal – first place	2017 Hohenlimburg	C1

Mònica Dòria Vilarrubla (born 4 December 1999) is an Andorran slalom canoeist who has competed at the international level since 2014. Mònica was the flagbearer for Andorra at the 2020 Summer Olympics and at the 2024 Summer Olympics.

== Career ==
Dòria won two medals at the ICF Canoe Slalom World Championships with a silver in the C1 event in 2026 and a bronze in kayak cross in 2022.

She also won a gold medal in the C1 event at the 2025 European Championships in Vaires-sur-Marne.

At the 2020 Olympics, she finished 16th in the K1 event and 11th in the C1 event after being eliminated in the semifinals of both.

At the 2024 Paris Olympics, Dòria competed in the K1 event, kayak cross and the C1 event, finishing in 22nd place, 15th place and 6th place respectively.

She won a gold medal in the C1 event at the 2017 Junior European Championships in Hohenlimburg, Germany. She earned her best senior world championship results of 8th and 30th (C1 and K1, respectively), at the 2019 ICF Canoe Slalom World Championships in La Seu d'Urgell. These results secured her a quota place for the 2020 Summer Olympics in Tokyo, where she represented Andorra in the C1 and K1 events. This was only the second time Andorra has been represented in canoe slalom at the Olympic Games, after Montserrat García Riberaygua competed in the K1 event at the 2008 Beijing Olympics.

She is based in Spain but competes for Andorra.

== Results ==
=== World Cup individual podiums ===
Season	Date	Venue	Position	Event
2019	23 June 2019	Bratislava	2nd	C1
2022	3 September 2022	La Seu d'Urgell	3rd	K1
2023	4 June 2023	Augsburg	3rd	Kayak cross
2023	10 June 2023	Prague	2nd	C1
2024	1 June 2024	Augsburg	3rd	C1
2025	6 June 2025	La Seu d'Urgell	3rd	K1
2026	11 September 2026	La Seu d'Urgell	3rd	K1
2026	13 September 2026	La Seu d'Urgell	3rd	Kayak cross

=== Complete World Cup results ===
Year	Class	WC1	WC2	WC3	WC4	WC5	Points	Position
2014	C1	Lee Valley (United Kingdom)	Tacen (Slovenia)	Prague (Czech Republic)	La Seu (Spain); 18	Augsburg (Germany)	9	40th
2014	K1	Lee Valley (United Kingdom)	Tacen (Slovenia)	Prague (Czech Republic)	42	Augsburg (Germany)	2	77th
2015	C1	Prague (Czech Republic)	Kraków (Poland)	Liptovský Mikuláš (Slovakia)	La Seu (Spain); 18	Pau (France); 21	11	32nd
2015	K1	Prague (Czech Republic)	Kraków (Poland)	Liptovský Mikuláš (Slovakia)	37	42	4	86th
2016	C1	Ivrea (Italy)	La Seu (Spain); 17	Pau (France); 14	Prague (Czech Republic); 37	Tacen (Slovenia); 8	96	12th
2016	K1	Ivrea (Italy)	39	40	37	38	8	58th
2017	C1	Prague (Czech Republic)	Augsburg (Germany); 31	Markkleeberg (Germany)	Ivrea (Italy); 28	La Seu (Spain); 30	21	46th
2017	K1	Prague (Czech Republic)	52	Markkleeberg (Germany)	32	45	6	61st
2018	C1	Liptovský Mikuláš (Slovakia)	Kraków (Poland)	Augsburg (Germany)	Tacen (Slovenia)	La Seu (Spain); 9	72	25th
2018	K1	Liptovský Mikuláš (Slovakia)	Kraków (Poland)	Augsburg (Germany)	Tacen (Slovenia)	30	10	55th
2019	C1	Lee Valley (United Kingdom); 29	Bratislava (Slovakia); 2	Tacen (Slovenia)	Markkleeberg (Germany); 21	Prague (Czech Republic)	84	26th
2019	K1	33	23	Tacen (Slovenia)	20	Prague (Czech Republic)	44	38th
2020	C1	Tacen (Slovenia)	Pau (France); 15				N/A^{[a]}	
2020	K1	Tacen (Slovenia)	19				N/A^{[a]}	
2021	C1	Prague (Czech Republic); 24	Markkleeberg (Germany); 30	La Seu (Spain); 5	Pau (France); 27		88	20th
2021	K1	20	37	14	10		122	16th

Notes
^{a} No overall rankings were determined by the ICF, with only two races possible due to the COVID-19 pandemic.

Olympic Games
Preceded by Irineu Esteve Altimiras	Flagbearer for Andorra (with Pol Moya); Tokyo 2020	Succeeded by Maeva Estevez
Preceded by Maeva Estevez	Flagbearer for Andorra (with Nahuel Carabaña); París 2024	Succeeded by Joan Verdú; Irineu Esteve Altimiras
