= Sailing at the 1996 Summer Olympics – Women's Mistral One Design =

Sailing at the Olympics

Mistral One Design Women's at the Games of the XXVI Olympiad
- Mistral One Design
- Venue: Savannah
- Dates: 22 July to 2 August
- Competitors: 27 from 27 nations
- Teams: 27

Medalists
1st place, gold medalist(s)		Lai Shan Lee	Hong Kong
2nd place, silver medalist(s)		Barbara Kendall	New Zealand
3rd place, bronze medalist(s)		Alessandra Sensini	Italy

The Women's Sailboard (Mistral One Design Class) Competition at the 1996 Summer Olympics was held from 23 to 29 July 1996, in Savannah, Georgia, United States. Points were awarded for placement in each race. Eleven races were scheduled. Nine races were sailed. Each sailor had two discards.

== Results ==
Rank	Helmsman (Country)	Race I		Race II		Race III		Race IV		Race V		Race VI		Race VII		Race VIII		Race IX		Total Points	Total -1
Rank	Helmsman (Country)	Rank	Points	Rank	Points	Rank	Points	Rank	Points	Rank	Points	Rank	Points	Rank	Points	Rank	Points	Rank	Points	Total Points	Total -1
1st place, gold medalist(s)	Lai Shan Lee (HKG)	3	3.0	2	2.0	2	2.0	2	2.0	4	4.0	2	2.0	~~7~~	~~7.0~~	1	1.0	~~DNC~~	~~28.0~~	51.0	16.0
2nd place, silver medalist(s)	Barbara Kendall (NZL)	2	2.0	3	3.0	6	6.0	1	1.0	~~10~~	~~10.0~~	5	5.0	5	5.0	~~6~~	~~6.0~~	2	2.0	40.0	24.0
3rd place, bronze medalist(s)	Alessandra Sensini (ITA)	1	1.0	7	7.0	1	1.0	6	6.0	7	7.0	~~15~~	~~15.0~~	~~14~~	~~14.0~~	5	5.0	1	1.0	57.0	28.0
4	Ke Li (CHN)	4	4.0	~~14~~	~~14.0~~	5	5.0	9	9.0	2	2.0	~~7~~	~~7.0~~	6	6.0	2	2.0	3	3.0	52.0	29.0
5	Jorunn Horgen (NOR)	7	7.0	~~8~~	~~8.0~~	4	4.0	4	4.0	3	3.0	1	1.0	8	8.0	4	4.0	~~PMS~~	~~28.0~~	67.0	31.0
6	Dorota Staszewska (POL)	6	6.0	4	4.0	8	8.0	~~12~~	~~12.0~~	~~13~~	~~13.0~~	3	3.0	9	9.0	3	3.0	5	5.0	63.0	38.0
7	Penny Wilson (GBR)	5	5.0	YMP	5.0	14	14.0	5	5.0	5	5.0	6	6.0	4	4.0	~~20~~	~~20.0~~	~~PMS~~	~~28.0~~	92.0	44.0
8	Maud Herbert (FRA)	8	8.0	1	1.0	~~17~~	~~17.0~~	8	8.0	1	1.0	9	9.0	~~11~~	~~11.0~~	10	10.0	9	9.0	74.0	46.0
9	Natasha Sturges (AUS)	~~12~~	~~12.0~~	10	10.0	3	3.0	3	3.0	~~12~~	~~12.0~~	4	4.0	10	10.0	11	11.0	7	7.0	72.0	48.0
10	Dorien de Vries (NED)	~~13~~	~~13.0~~	5	5.0	~~DSQ~~	~~28.0~~	10	10.0	8	8.0	8	8.0	3	3.0	12	12.0	6	6.0	93.0	52.0
11	Lanee Butler (USA)	9	9.0	~~15~~	~~15.0~~	~~18~~	~~18.0~~	7	7.0	11	11.0	13	13.0	1	1.0	8	8.0	4	4.0	86.0	53.0
12	Caroll-Ann Alie (CAN)	11	11.0	6	6.0	7	7.0	~~16~~	~~16.0~~	6	6.0	10	10.0	2	2.0	14	14.0	~~PMS~~	~~28.0~~	100.0	56.0
13	Mireia Casas (ESP)	14	14.0	13	13.0	11	11.0	11	11.0	~~23~~	~~23.0~~	11	11.0	~~15~~	~~15.0~~	7	7.0	12	12.0	117.0	79.0
14	Lisa Neuburger (ISV)	10	10.0	12	12.0	~~15~~	~~15.0~~	13	13.0	9	9.0	12	12.0	12	12.0	~~13~~	~~13.0~~	11	11.0	107.0	79.0
15	Masako Imai (JPN)	~~18~~	~~18.0~~	11	11.0	16	16.0	17	17.0	16	16.0	17	17.0	~~18~~	~~18.0~~	9	9.0	10	10.0	132.0	96.0
16	Joo Soon-ahn (KOR)	15	15.0	~~20~~	~~20.0~~	9	9.0	14	14.0	14	14.0	14	14.0	13	13.0	~~16~~	~~16.0~~	16	16.0	131.0	95.0
17	Mónica Fechino (ARG)	17	17.0	18	18.0	10	10.0	18	18.0	~~25~~	~~25.0~~	16	16.0	~~20~~	~~20.0~~	15	15.0	14	14.0	153.0	108.0
18	Ilona Dzelme (LAT)	~~20~~	~~20.0~~	19	19.0	20	20.0	15	15.0	17	17.0	~~25~~	~~25.0~~	17	17.0	17	17.0	8	8.0	158.0	113.0
19	Lucía Martínez (PUR)	16	16.0	17	17.0	12	12.0	20	20.0	19	19.0	18	18.0	~~PMS~~	~~28.0~~	~~23~~	~~23.0~~	15	15.0	168.0	117.0
20	Minna Aalto (FIN)	~~21~~	~~21.0~~	~~22~~	~~22.0~~	13	13.0	19	19.0	18	18.0	20	20.0	16	16.0	18	18.0	13	13.0	160.0	117.0
21	Catarina Fagundes (POR)	~~PMS~~	~~28.0~~	16	16.0	19	19.0	21	21.0	15	15.0	~~23~~	~~23.0~~	23	23.0	19	19.0	20	20.0	184.0	133.0
22	Turia Vogel (COK)	24	24.0	~~26~~	~~26.0~~	21	21.0	~~27~~	~~27.0~~	24	24.0	19	19.0	19	19.0	22	22.0	17	17.0	199.0	146.0
23	Angeliki Skarlatou (GRE)	~~23~~	~~23.0~~	21	21.0	~~24~~	~~24.0~~	22	22.0	22	22.0	24	24.0	21	21.0	21	21.0	19	19.0	197.0	149.0
24	Fiona Morrison (AND)	~~PMS~~	~~28.0~~	23	23.0	~~25~~	~~25.0~~	24	24.0	20	20.0	22	22.0	22	22.0	24	24.0	18	18.0	206.0	153.0
25	Ayşe Sözeri (TUR)	22	22.0	~~25~~	~~25.0~~	22	22.0	~~25~~	~~25.0~~	21	21.0	21	21.0	24	24.0	25	25.0	21	21.0	206.0	156.0
26	Christina Forte (BRA)	19	19.0	24	24.0	23	23.0	23	23.0	~~DNC~~	~~28.0~~	~~DNC~~	~~28.0~~	DNC	28.0	DNC	28.0	DNC	28.0	229.0	173.0
27	Cathleen Moore-Linn (GUM)	25	25.0	~~27~~	~~27.0~~	~~26~~	~~26.0~~	26	26.0	26	26.0	26	26.0	25	25.0	26	26.0	22	22.0	229.0	176.0

DNF = Did Not Finish, DNC= Did Not Come to the starting area, DSQ = Disqualified, PMS = Premature Start, YMP = Yacht Materially Prejudiced

=== Daily standings ===
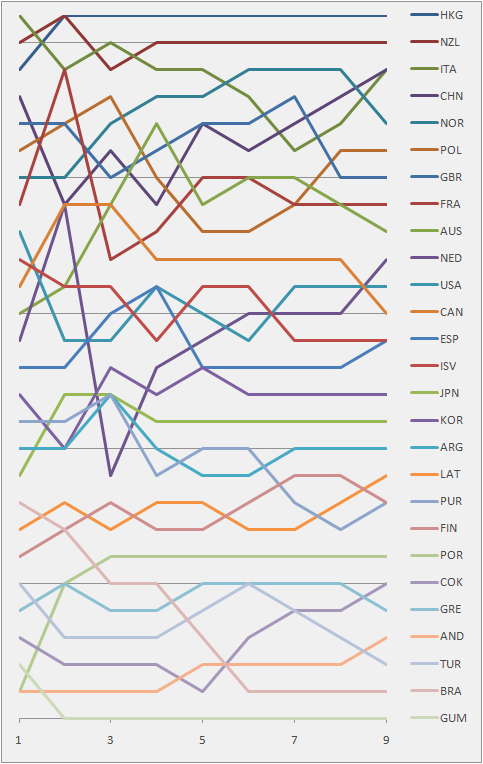
Graph showing the daily standings in the Mistral One Design Woman's during the 1996 Summer Olympics

== Conditions at the Mistral course area's ==
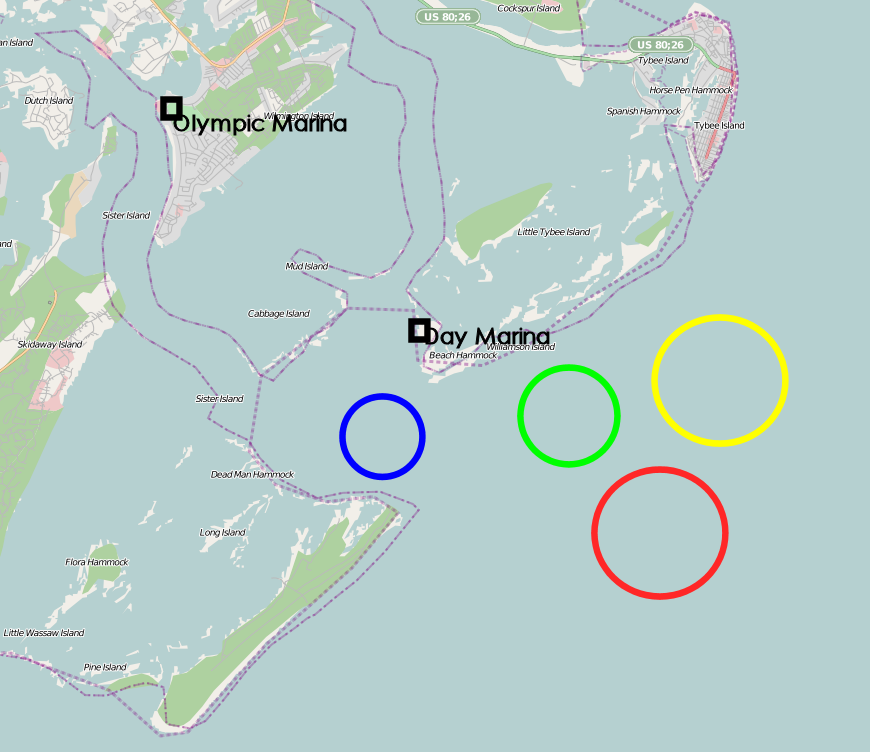
Black: Marinas
Blue: Alpha course
Green: Bravo course
Yellow: Charly course
Red: Delta course

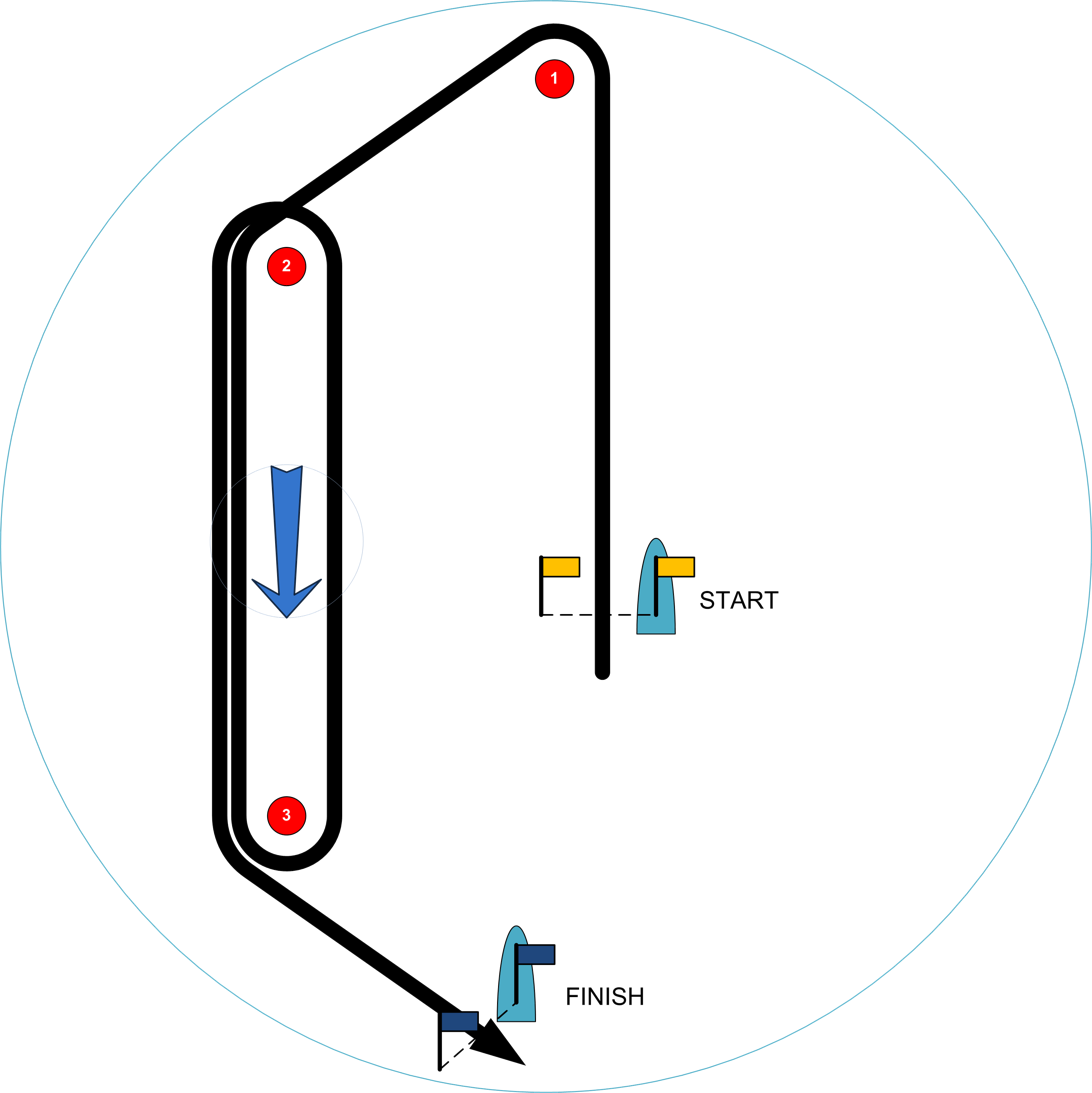
Olympic course ZO.
S(Start) - 1 - 2 - 3 - 2 - 3 - F(Finish reaching)

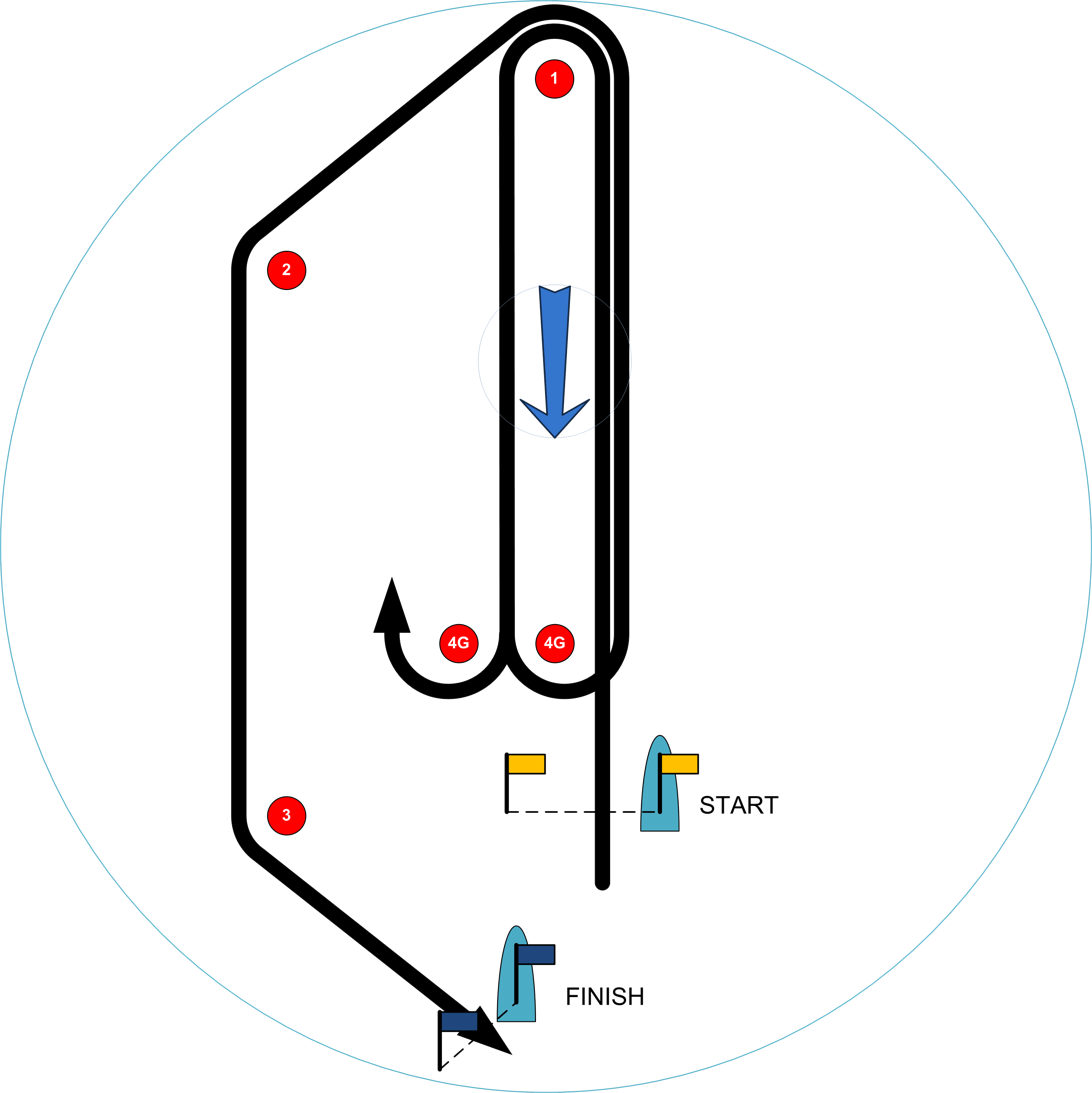
Olympic course ZI.
S(Start) - 1 - 4G - 1 - 2 - 3 - F(Finish reaching)

Date	Race	°C	Knot	Meter	Course	Course area
23 July 1996	I	31	13	0.3		Alpha
23 July 1996	II	30	12	0.3		Alpha
24 July 1996	III	29	10	0.3		Alpha
24 July 1996	IV	26	13	0.3		Alpha
25 July 1996	V	30	11	0.3	ZO	Alpha
26 July 1996	VI	27	8	0.2	ZI	Alpha
26 July 1996	VII	28	10	0.2	ZI	Alpha
28 July 1996	VIII	29	9	0.3	ZO	Alpha
29 July 1996	IX	29	10	0.1	ZI	Alpha
