= Andorra at the 2024 Summer Olympics =

- IOC code: AND
- NOC: Andorran Olympic Committee
- Website: www.coa.ad

in Paris, France 26 July 2024 – 11 August 2024
- Competitors: 2 (1 man and 1 woman) in 2 sports
- Flag bearer (opening): Nahuel Carabaña & Mònica Dòria
- Flag bearer (closing): Nahuel Carabaña
- Medals: Gold 0 Silver 0 Bronze 0 Total 0

Summer Olympics appearances (overview)
- 1976; 1980; 1984; 1988; 1992; 1996; 2000; 2004; 2008; 2012; 2016; 2020; 2024

Andorra competed at the 2024 Summer Olympics in Paris from 26 July to 11 August 2024. It was the nation's thirteenth appearance at the Summer Olympics, since the official debut at 1976.

The Andorran delegation consisted of two athletes competing in two sports. Both athletes, Nahuel Carabaña and Mònica Dòria were the country's flagbearers during the 2024 Summer Olympics opening ceremony.

== Competitors ==
The following is the list of number of competitors in the Games.

Sport	Men	Women	Total
Athletics	1	0	1
Canoeing	0	1	1
Total	1	1	2

== Athletics ==
Andorran track and field athletes achieved the entry standards by world ranking, in the following events (a maximum of 3 athletes each):

Key

- Note–Ranks given for track events are within the athlete's heat only
- Q = Qualified for the next round
- q = Qualified for the next round as the fastest loser or, in field events, by position without achieving the qualifying target
- NR = National record
- N/A = Round not applicable for the event
- Bye = Athlete not required to compete in round

Track and road events

Athlete	Event	Preliminary		Heat		Repechage		Semifinal		Final	
Athlete	Event	Time	Rank	Time	Rank	Time	Rank	Time	Rank	Time	Rank
Nahuel Carabaña	Men's 3000 m steeplechase	—		8:19.44	7	—				Did not advance	

== Canoeing ==
=== Slalom ===
Andorra entered one boat into the slalom competition, for the Games through the 2023 ICF Canoe Slalom World Championships in London, Great Britain.

Athlete	Event	Preliminary						Semifinal		Final	
Athlete	Event	Run 1	Rank	Run 2	Rank	Best	Rank	Time	Rank	Time	Rank
Mònica Dòria	Women's C-1	101.28	3	151.68	19	101.28	3 Q	106.53	3 Q	113.58	6
Mònica Dòria	Women's K-1	95.93	4	98.51	15	95.93	10 Q	156.28	22	Did not advance	

Kayak cross

Athlete	Event	Time trial		Round 1	Repechage	Heat	Quarterfinal	Semifinal	Final	
Athlete	Event	Time	Rank	Position	Position	Position	Position	Position	Position	Rank
Mònica Dòria	Women's KX-1	73.15	9	1 Q	Bye	2 Q	4	Did not advance		15
