= Andorra at the 2016 Summer Olympics =

- IOC code: AND
- NOC: Andorran Olympic Committee

in Rio de Janeiro
- Competitors: 5 in 4 sports
- Flag bearers: Laura Sallés (opening); Pol Moya (closing)
- Medals: Gold 0 Silver 0 Bronze 0 Total 0

Summer Olympics appearances (overview)
- 1976; 1980; 1984; 1988; 1992; 1996; 2000; 2004; 2008; 2012; 2016; 2020; 2024

Andorra competed at the 2016 Summer Olympics in Rio de Janeiro, Brazil, from 5 to 21 August 2016. This was the nation's eleventh consecutive appearance at the Summer Olympics.

The Andorra Olympic Committee (Catalan: Comitè Olímpic Andorrà) sent a total of five athletes, two men and three women, to the Games, competing in athletics, judo, shooting, and swimming. Four of them made their maiden appearance at these Games, with swimmer Mónica Ramírez being the only returning athlete from London 2012. Half-middleweight judoka Laura Sallés was the nation's flag bearer in the opening ceremony. Andorra, however, has yet to win its first ever Olympic medal.

== Athletics ==
Andorra received a universality slot from IAAF to send a male athlete to the Olympics.

Key

- Note–Ranks given for track events are within the athlete's heat only
- Q = Qualified for the next round
- q = Qualified for the next round as a fastest loser or, in field events, by position without achieving the qualifying target
- NR = National record
- N/A = Round not applicable for the event
- Bye = Athlete not required to compete in round

Track & road events

| Athlete | Event | Heat | | Semifinal | | Final | |
| Athlete | Event | Result | Rank | Result | Rank | Result | Rank |
|---|---|---|---|---|---|---|---|
| Pol Moya | Men's 800 m | 1:48.88 | 6 | Did not advance | | | |

== Judo ==
Andorra received an invitation from the Tripartite Commission to send a judoka competing in the women's half-middleweight category (63 kg) to the Olympics.

| Athlete | Event | Round of 32 | Round of 16 | Quarterfinals | Semifinals | Repechage | Final / BM | |
| Athlete | Event | Opposition Result | Opposition Result | Opposition Result | Opposition Result | Opposition Result | Opposition Result | Rank |
|---|---|---|---|---|---|---|---|---|
| Laura Sallés | Women's −63 kg | Haecker (AUS); L 000–100 | Did not advance | | | | | |

== Shooting ==
Andorra received an invitation from the Tripartite Commission to send a women's air rifle shooter to the Olympics.

| Athlete | Event | Qualification | | Final | |
| Athlete | Event | Points | Rank | Points | Rank |
|---|---|---|---|---|---|
| Esther Barrugués | Women's 10 m air rifle | 396.9 | 51 | Did not advance | |

Qualification Legend: Q = Qualify for the next round; q = Qualify for the bronze medal (shotgun)

== Swimming ==
Andorra received a universality invitation from FINA to send two swimmers (one male and one female) to the Olympics.

| Athlete | Event | Heat | | Semifinal | | Final | |
| Athlete | Event | Time | Rank | Time | Rank | Time | Rank |
|---|---|---|---|---|---|---|---|
| Pol Arias | Men's 400 m freestyle | 4:21.16 | 49 | —N/a | | Did not advance | |
| Mónica Ramírez | Women's 100 m freestyle | DNS | | Did not advance | | | |
