= Andorra at the 2020 Summer Olympics =

- IOC code: AND
- NOC: Andorran Olympic Committee
- Website: www.coa.ad

in Tokyo, Japan 23 July 2021 – 8 August 2021
- Competitors: 2 (1 men and 1 women) in 2 sports
- Flag bearers (opening): Mònica Dòria; Pol Moya
- Flag bearer (closing): Pol Moya
- Medals: Gold 0 Silver 0 Bronze 0 Total 0

Summer Olympics appearances (overview)
- 1976; 1980; 1984; 1988; 1992; 1996; 2000; 2004; 2008; 2012; 2016; 2020; 2024

Andorra competed at the 2020 Summer Olympics in Tokyo. Originally scheduled to take place from 24 July to 9 August 2020, the Games were postponed to 23 July to 8 August 2021, because of the COVID-19 pandemic. It is the nation's twelfth consecutive appearance at the Summer Olympics.

== Competitors ==
The following is the list of number of competitors in the Games.

Sport	Men	Women	Total
Athletics	1	0	1
Canoeing	0	1	1
Total	1	1	2

== Athletics ==
Andorra received universality slots from IAAF to send a male track and field athlete to the Olympics.

Key

- Note–Ranks given for track events are within the athlete's heat only
- Q = Qualified for the next round
- q = Qualified for the next round as a fastest loser or, in field events, by position without achieving the qualifying target
- NR = National record
- N/A = Round not applicable for the event
- Bye = Athlete not required to compete in round

Track & road events

Athlete	Event	Heat		Semifinal		Final	
Athlete	Event	Result	Rank	Result	Rank	Result	Rank
Pol Moya	Men's 800 m	1:47.44	7	Did not advance			

== Canoeing ==
=== Slalom ===
Andorra qualified one boat through the 2019 ICF Canoe Slalom World Championships in La Seu d'Urgell, Spain, marking the country's return to the sport after a twelve-year absence.

Athlete	Event	Preliminary						Semifinal		Final	
Athlete	Event	Run 1	Rank	Run 2	Rank	Best	Rank	Time	Rank	Time	Rank
Mònica Dòria	Women's C-1	113.78	6	119.69	14	113.78	9 Q	128.32	11	Did not advance	
Mònica Dòria	Women's K-1	110.57	11	110.54	13	110.54	14 Q	118.15	16	Did not advance	
