= 2026 ICF Canoe Slalom World Championships – Women's C1 =

Women's canoe at the 2026 ICF Canoe Slalom World Championships
- Venue: RIVERSPORT OKC
- Location: Oklahoma City, United States
- Dates: 22–24 July 2026
- Competitors: 55 from 27 nations

Medalists
gold medal	Tereza Kneblová	Czech Republic
silver medal	Mònica Dòria	Andorra
bronze medal	Klaudia Zwolińska	Poland

The women's canoe event at the 2026 ICF Canoe Slalom World Championships took place on 24 July 2026 at the RIVERSPORT OKC in Oklahoma City, with the qualification heats on 22 July 2026.

== Competition format ==
The event uses a three-round format with qualification heats, semifinal and final. The top 30 paddlers from the single qualification run qualify for the semifinal. Paddlers start in the reverse order of their qualification position in the semifinal and complete a single run, with the top 12 advancing to the final. The start list for the final is once again in reverse order of the semifinal results. The athlete with the best time in the single-run final is awarded gold.

A penalty of 2 seconds is awarded for touching a gate and a 50-second penalty is awarded for missing a gate or negotiating it in the opposite direction.

The qualification course had 22 gates including 6 upstream gates (5-7-11-14-17-20). The semifinal and final course also had 22 gates with 6 upstream gates (5-7-11-14-17-22).

== Schedule ==
All times listed are UTC-5.

Date	Time	Round
22 July 2026
22 July 2026	11:56	Heats
24 July 2026
24 July 2026	11:11	Semifinal
24 July 2026	14:45	Final

== Results ==
Penalties are included in the time shown. The fastest time in each round is shown in bold.

Rank	Bib	Canoeist	Nation	Heats			Semifinal			Final		
Rank	Bib	Canoeist	Nation	Time	Pen	Rank	Time	Pen	Rank	Time	Pen	Rank
1st place, gold medalist(s)	13	Tereza Kneblová	Czech Republic	95.08	0	7	103.63	4	12	**100.52**	0	1
2nd place, silver medalist(s)	6	Mònica Dòria	Andorra	93.48	0	2	**98.03**	0	1	103.04	0	2
3rd place, bronze medalist(s)	20	Klaudia Zwolińska	Poland	98.21	0	16	101.76	0	6	103.21	0	3
4	15	Marta Bertoncelli	Italy	96.44	0	11	100.64	0	4	104.17	0	4
5	2	Kimberley Woods	Great Britain	94.26	0	4	103.62	2	11	104.48	2	5
6	5	Zuzana Paňková	Slovakia	96.11	0	8	99.89	0	2	104.63	2	6
7	19	Angèle Hug	France	94.93	0	6	102.47	0	9	105.04	2	7
8	21	Marjorie Delassus	France	**93.19**	0	1	101.00	0	5	105.45	2	8
9	7	Evy Leibfarth	United States	98.87	0	19	100.63	0	3	106.58	2	9
10	32	Taisiia Pospelova	Individual Neutral Athletes	101.44	0	28	102.45	0	8	113.04	4	10
11	8	Miren Lazkano	Spain	97.45	0	15	102.13	0	7	113.81	2	11
12	29	Adriana Morenová	Czech Republic	98.94	0	20	102.67	2	10	153.71	52	12
13	12	Andrea Herzog	Germany	100.82	4	25	104.02	2	13	Did not advance		
14	1	Jessica Fox	Australia	96.20	0	10	104.04	4	14	Did not advance		
15	16	Doriane Delassus	France	100.34	4	24	104.08	4	15	Did not advance		
16	18	Soňa Stanovská	Slovakia	98.77	0	18	104.47	2	16	Did not advance		
17	11	Núria Vilarrubla	Spain	96.18	0	9	104.50	2	17	Did not advance		
18	3	Eva Alina Hočevar	Slovenia	97.13	2	14	105.39	2	18	Did not advance		
19	35	Lucie Krech	Germany	101.29	2	27	107.03	4	19	Did not advance		
20	25	Emanuela Luknárová	Slovakia	102.49	0	30	107.05	2	20	Did not advance		
21	31	Ellis Miller	Great Britain	101.11	0	26	107.33	2	21	Did not advance		
22	26	Nele Bayn	Germany	100.08	0	23	107.56	4	22	Did not advance		
23	30	Alsu Minazova	Individual Neutral Athletes	98.37	0	17	107.74	0	23	Did not advance		
24	22	Elena Borghi	Italy	96.70	0	12	107.84	4	24	Did not advance		
24	33	Huang Juan	China	101.63	2	29	107.84	0	24	Did not advance		
26	14	Viktoriia Us	Ukraine	99.10	0	21	112.59	4	26	Did not advance		
27	17	Alena Marx	Switzerland	93.60	0	3	114.44	4	27	Did not advance		
28	10	Ana Sátila	Brazil	94.32	0	5	151.96	50	28	Did not advance		
29	28	Klara Olazabal	Spain	99.59	0	22	167.87	52	29	Did not advance		
30	34	Mallory Franklin	Great Britain	96.91	0	13	234.12	104	30	Did not advance		
31	38	Eyleen Vuilleumier	Switzerland	102.63	2	31	Did not advance					
32	23	Lea Novak	Slovenia	103.24	2	32	Did not advance					
33	4	Martina Satková	Czech Republic	103.51	0	33	Did not advance					
34	9	Noemie Fox	Australia	103.75	2	34	Did not advance					
35	44	Chen Shi	China	103.79	2	35	Did not advance					
36	37	Michaela Corcoran	Ireland	105.69	0	36	Did not advance					
37	47	Carden Oetting	United States	106.08	0	37	Did not advance					
38	41	Lois Betteridge	Canada	106.71	2	38	Did not advance					
39	27	Alja Kozorog	Slovenia	108.82	0	39	Did not advance					
40	46	Haruka Okazaki	Japan	109.02	0	40	Did not advance					
41	55	Georgina Cochrane	Ireland	109.14	4	41	Did not advance					
42	36	Omira Estácia Neta	Brazil	109.52	2	42	Did not advance					
43	43	Anastassiya Ananyeva	Kazakhstan	110.00	2	43	Did not advance					
44	42	Carolina Massarenti	Colombia	110.46	4	44	Did not advance					
45	49	Rosie Rex	New Zealand	111.35	2	45	Did not advance					
46	39	Marcella Altman	United States	113.51	4	46	Did not advance					
47	48	Kahlia Cullwick	New Zealand	114.68	6	47	Did not advance					
48	45	Hanna Danek	Poland	116.07	4	48	Did not advance					
49	51	Ana Paula Fernandes Castro	Paraguay	124.81	4	49	Did not advance					
50	54	Yekaterina Tarantseva	Kazakhstan	126.44	4	50	Did not advance					
51	50	Chung Yu-han	Chinese Taipei	134.07	6	51	Did not advance					
52	24	Lena Teunissen	Netherlands	156.82	52	52	Did not advance					
53	53	Alua Mauletkan	Kazakhstan	158.90	6	53	Did not advance					
54	52	Georgia Rellia	Greece	190.22	60	54	Did not advance					
55	40	Yang Ting	China	207.38	100	55	Did not advance					
