= Gerard Barcia =

Andorran trap shooter

Gerard Barcia Duedra
Personal information
- Born: 9 November 1963 (age 62)

Sport
- Sport: Sports shooting

Gerard Barcia Duedra (born 9 November 1963) is an Andorran trap shooter who competed in the 1996 Summer Olympics.

Barcia competed in the trap shooting event at the 1996 Summer Olympics, and after two days of shooting Barcia scored 117 points and finished the competition in 37th place so didn't qualify for the final.
