= Alex Antor =

Andorran alpine skier (born 1979)

Personal information
- Full name: Alex Antor Seignourel
- Born: 1 April 1979 (age 46) Narbonne, Aude, France
- Height: 187 cm (6 ft 2 in)

Sport
- Country: Andorra
- Sport: Skiing

Alex Antor Seignourel (Note: In this Catalan name, the first or paternal surname is Antor and the second or maternal family name is Seignourel; both are generally joined by the conjunction "i".) (born 1 April 1979) is an Andorran alpine skier. He represented Andorra at the 2002 and 2006 Winter Olympics. He was their flag bearer in the 2006 Opening Ceremonies.

== Notes ==
Olympic Games
Preceded by Hocine Haciane	Flag bearer for Andorra; Torino 2006	Succeeded by Montserrat García
