= Andorran Sailing Federation =

Sports governing body in Andorra

Federació Andorrana de Vela
- IOC nation: Andorran (AND)
- Sport: Sailing
- Official website: www.andorravela.com

HISTORY
- Year of formation: 1988

DEMOGRAPHICS
- Number of Sailing clubs: TBC

AFFILIATIONS
- International federation: International Sailing Federation (ISAF)
- ISAF member since: 1989
- Continental association: EUROSAF
- National Paralympic Committee: Andorran Olympic Committee

ELECTED
- President: Josep M Pla

SECRETARIAT
- Address: Edifici Telecabina 1er FAV; Cami d'Engolasters S/N; AD200 Encamp
- Country: Andorra
- Secretary General: Rosa Val

FINANCE
- Company status: Association

The Andorran Sailing Federation (Catalan: Federació Andorrana De Vela, FAV) is the national governing body for the sport of sailing in Andorra, recognised by the International Sailing Federation.
