= Irineu Esteve Altimiras =

Andorran cross-country skier (born 1996)

Irineu Esteve
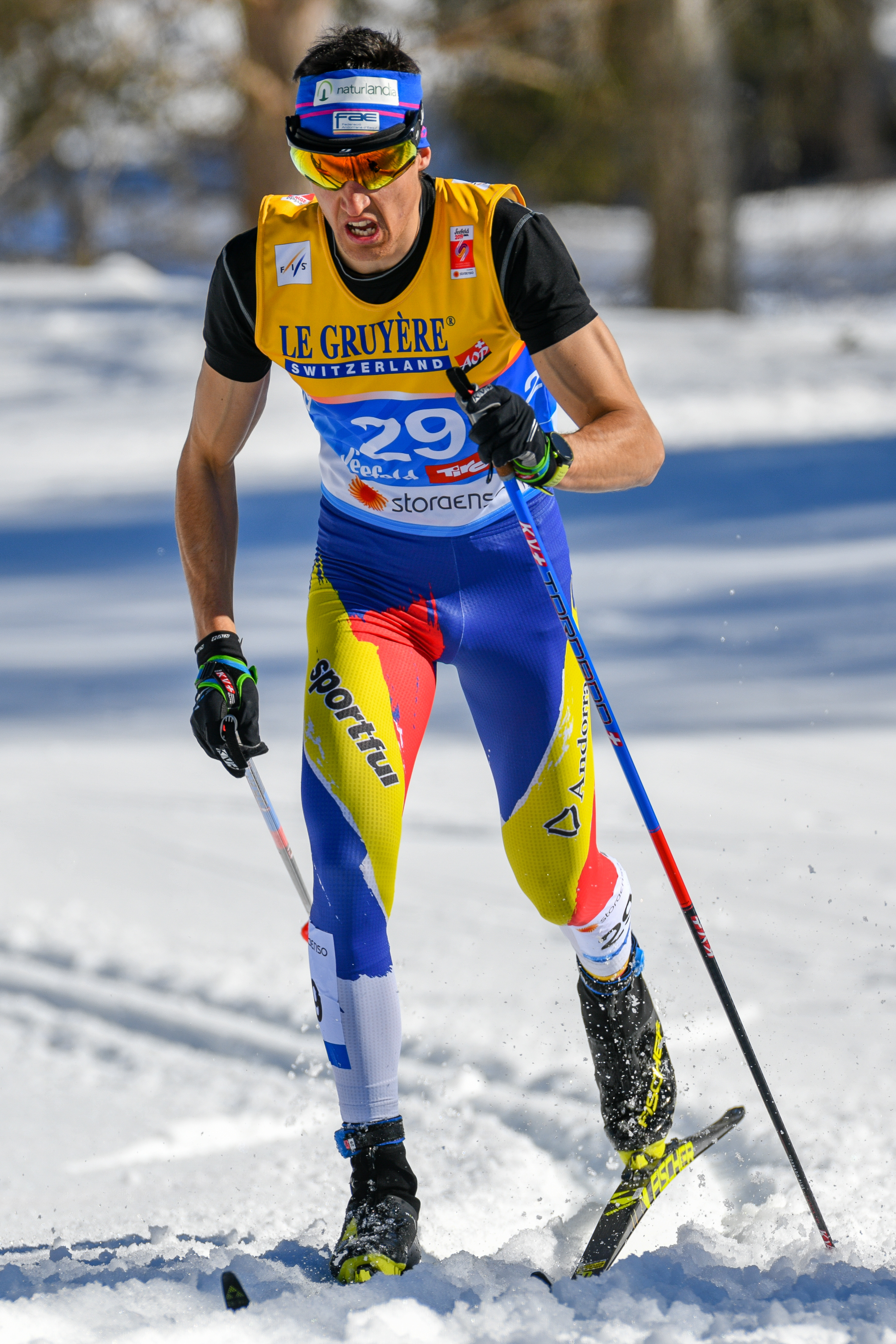
- Esteve in 2019

Personal information
- Full name: Irineu Esteve Altimiras
- Nationality: Andorra
- Born: 21 June 1996 (age 30) Andorra la Vella, Andorra
- Height: 179 cm (5 ft 10 in)

Sport
- Sport: Skiing
- Club: NEC La Rabassa-Naturlandia

World Cup career
- Seasons: 6 – (2018–present)
- Indiv. starts: 81
- Indiv. podiums: 0
- Team starts: 0
- Overall titles: 0 – (42nd in 2023)
- Discipline titles: 0
- Updated on 29 March 2023

Irineu Esteve Altimiras (Note: In this Catalan name, the first or paternal surname is Esteve and the second or maternal family name is Altimiras; both are generally joined by the conjunction "i".) (born 21 June 1996) is an Andorran cross-country skier who competes internationally.

He competed for Andorra at the FIS Nordic World Ski Championships 2017 in Lahti, Finland.

== Cross-country skiing results ==
All results are sourced from the International Ski Federation (FIS).

=== Olympic Games ===
Year	Age	15 km individual	30 km skiathlon	50 km mass start	Sprint	4 × 10 km relay	Team sprint
2018	21	27	46	34	—	—	—
2022	25	24	20	25^{[a]}	—	—	—

^{a} Distance reduced to 30 km due to weather conditions.

=== World Championships ===
Year	Age	15 km individual	30 km skiathlon	50 km mass start	Sprint	4 × 10 km relay	Team sprint
2017	20	29	33	—	—	—	—
2019	22	22	21	29	—	—	—
2021	24	15	21	34	—	—	—
2023	26	7	12	14	—	—	—

=== World Cup ===
==== Season standings ====
Season	Age	Discipline standings				Ski Tour standings			
Season	Age	Overall	Distance	Sprint	U23	Nordic Opening	Tour de Ski	Ski Tour 2020	World Cup Final
2018	21	NC	NC	—	NC	—	—	—N/a	—
2019	22	55	39	NC	8	41	24	—N/a	43
2020	23	44	23	NC	—N/a	—	23	25	—N/a
2021	24	46	34	NC	—N/a	—	22	—N/a	—N/a
2022	25	68	48	NC	—N/a	—N/a	26	—N/a	—N/a
2023	26	42	29	NC	—N/a	—N/a	31	—N/a	—N/a

== Notes ==
Olympic Games
Preceded by Laura Sallés	Flag bearer for Andorra; PyeongChang 2018	Succeeded by Mònica Dòria; Pol Moya
Preceded by Nahuel Carabaña; Mònica Dòria	Flag bearer for Andorra; Milano Cortina 2026 with Joan Verdú	Succeeded by Incumbent
