= Lluís Marín =

Andorran snowboarder

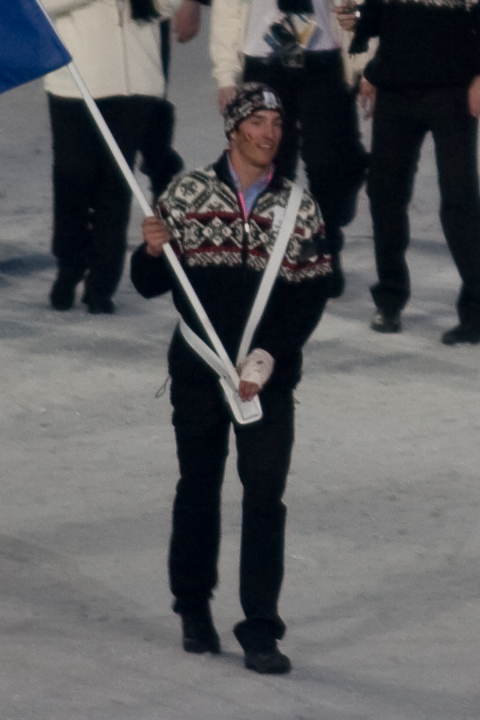
- Marín carrying the Andorran flag at the 2010 Winter Olympics opening ceremony

Personal information
- Full name: Lluís Marín Tarroch
- Born: 12 October 1988 (age 37) Andorra la Vella, Andorra
- Height: 6 ft 1 in (185 cm)
- Weight: 187 lb (85 kg)

Sport
- Country: Andorra
- Sport: Snowboarding

Lluís Marín Tarroch (Note: In this Catalan name, the first or paternal surname is Marín and the second or maternal family name is Tarroch; both are generally joined by the conjunction "i".) (born 12 October 1988) is an Andorran snowboarder. He competed for Andorra in snowboard cross at the 2010, 2014, and 2018 Winter Olympics. Marin was Andorra's flag bearer during the 2010 Winter Olympics opening ceremony. In 2010, Tarroch failed to qualify for the head-to-head rounds of his event after falling in one of his runs and ended up in 34th place.

Marín Tarroch twice finished 3rd in the World Cup: on 16 March 2012 in Italian Valmalenco and on 24 January 2016 in German Feldberg.

== Notes ==
Olympic Games
Preceded by Montserrat García	Flag bearer for Andorra; Vancouver 2010	Succeeded by Joan Tomàs Roca
