= Antoni Molne =

Andorran Olympic judoka

Antoni Molné
Personal information
- Full name: Antoni Molné Oviedo
- Nickname: Tony
- Born: 27 April 1969 (age 57)

Sport
- Country: Andorra
- Sport: Judo
- Event: 60 kg / 65 kg

Antoni Molné Oviedo (Note: In this Catalan name, the first or paternal surname is Molné and the second or maternal family name is Oviedo; both are generally joined by the conjunction "i".) (born 27 April 1969) is an Andorran judoka who competed in the 1992 Summer Olympics and the 1996 Summer Olympics.

Molne entered the extra lightweight competition at the 1992 Summer Olympics and after receiving a bye in the first round he lost to the Italian, Marino Cattefra in the next round. Four years later at the 1996 Summer Olympics he competed in the 65 kg weight division, again he received a bye in the first round before losing to Timur Mukhamedkhanov from Uzbekistan.
