= Ayşe Sözeri =

Turkish windsurfer

Personal information
- Nationality: Turkish
- Born: Ayşe Oktay Sözeri; 27 January 1974 (age 51) Kayseri, Turkey
- Height: 178 cm (5 ft 10 in)
- Weight: 70 kg (154 lb; 11 st 0 lb)

Sport
- Sport: Windsurfing

Ayşe Oktay Sözeri (born 27 January 1974) is a Turkish windsurfer. She competed in the women's Mistral One Design event at the 1996 Summer Olympics.
