= Maeva Estévez =

Andorran retired snowboarder

Personal information
- Born: 2 March 1995 (age 30)

Sport
- Country: Andorra
- Sport: Snowboarding
- Event: Snowboard cross
- Retired: 2024

Maeva Estévez Baux (born 2 March 1995) is an Andorran retired snowboarder who specialises in snowboard cross.

At the 2012 Winter Youth Olympics, Estévez competed in the girls' halfpipe and slopestyle events. Estévez participated in the 2022 Beijing Winter Olympics in the women's snowboard cross event, where she placed 31st overall after suffering a fall in her heat. She was the Andorran flag bearer at the opening ceremony. Estévez retired from competition in 2024.

Olympic Games
Preceded by Mònica Dòria; Pol Moya	Flag bearer for Andorra; Beijing 2022	Succeeded by Mònica Dòria; Nahuel Carabaña
