= Fiona Morrison =

Andorran windsurfer

Personal information
- Full name: Fiona Morrison Porta
- Nationality: Andorra
- Born: 18 May 1970; Encamp, Andorra

Sport
- Country: Andorra
- Sport: Windsurfing

Fiona Morrison Porta (Note: In this Catalan name, the first or paternal surname is Morrison and the second or maternal family name is Porta; both are generally joined by the conjunction "i".) (born 18 May 1970) is an Andorran windsurfer who competed at the 1996 Summer Olympics and artist who exhibited at the 55th Venice Biennale.

Morrison competed in the Women's Mistral One Design windsurfing event at the 1996 Summer Olympics, and after her nine races she ended with a net total of 153 points and finished in 24th place out of 27 starters.
