= Hocine Haciane =

Andorran swimmer

Personal information
- Full name: Hocine Haciane Constantin
- Nationality: Andorra
- Born: 7 July 1986 (age 40) Andorra la Vella, Andorra
- Height: 1.68 m (5 ft 6 in)
- Weight: 72 kg (159 lb)

Sport
- Sport: Swimming
Medal record
Games of the Small States of Europe
Gold medal – first place	2003 Malta	400 m medley
Gold medal – first place	2011 Liechtenstein	200 m butterfly
Silver medal – second place	2003 Malta	200 m breaststroke
Silver medal – second place	2003 Malta	200 m butterfly
Silver medal – second place	2009 Cyprus	200 m breaststroke
Silver medal – second place	2009 Cyprus	200 m butterfly
Silver medal – second place	2009 Cyprus	200 m medley
Silver medal – second place	2009 Cyprus	400 m medley
Silver medal – second place	2011 Liechtenstein	200 m medley
Bronze medal – third place	2003 Malta	400 m freestyle
Bronze medal – third place	2003 Malta	4x200 m freestyle
Bronze medal – third place	2009 Cyprus	100 m breaststroke
Bronze medal – third place	2011 Liechtenstein	400 m medley
Bronze medal – third place	2011 Liechtenstein	200 m breaststroke

Hocine Haciane Constantin (Note: In this Catalan name, the first or paternal surname is Haciane and the second or maternal family name is Constantin; both are generally joined by the conjunction "i".) (born 7 July 1986 in Andorra la Vella) is an Olympic and national record holding swimmer from Andorra. At the 2004 Olympics, he was Andorra's flagbearer.

He has swum for Andorra at the:

- Olympics: 2004, 2008, 2012
- World Championships:2003, 2005, 2009, 2011
- Mediterranean Games: 2009
- GSSE: 2001, 2003, 2005, 2007, 2009, 2011
- Short Course Worlds: 2010

== Notes ==
Olympic Games
Preceded by Victor Gómez	Flag bearer for Andorra; Athens 2004	Succeeded by Alex Antor
