= Santiago Deu =

Andorran swimmer (born 1980)

Personal information
- Full name: Santiago Deu
- National team: Andorra
- Born: 21 March 1980 (age 46) Andorra la Vella, Andorra
- Height: 1.88 m (6 ft 2 in)
- Weight: 80 kg (176 lb)

Sport
- Sport: Swimming
- Strokes: Freestyle

Santiago Deu Sandoval (born March 21, 1980) is an Andorran former swimmer, who specialized in middle-distance freestyle events. Deu competed only in the men's 200 m freestyle at the 2000 Summer Olympics in Sydney. He received a Universality place from FINA in an entry time of 1:59.39. He challenged four other swimmers in heat one, including Uzbekistan's two-time Olympian Oleg Tsvetkovskiy. Deu rounded out the field to last place in a personal best of 1:59.31, finishing behind the leader Tsvetskovskiy by 4.38 seconds. Deu failed to advance into the semifinals, as he placed fifty-first overall in the prelims.
