= Francesc Gaset Fris =

Andorran sport shooter

Personal information
- Born: 26 April 1947 (age 79) Andorra
- Height: 1.84 m (6 ft 1/2 in)
- Weight: 84 kg (185 lb)

Sport
- Country: Andorra
- Sport: Shooting sport
- Event: Olympic trap

Francesc Gaset Fris (born 26 April 1947) is an Andorran former sport shooter who competed at the 1980 and 1984 Summer Olympics. He was the flagbearer for Andorra at the 1980 Olympics.
