= Timur Mukhamedkhanov =

Uzbekistani judoka

Personal information
- Nationality: Uzbekistani
- Born: 13 October 1971 (age 53)

Sport
- Sport: Judo

Timur Mukhamedkhanov (born 13 October 1971) is an Uzbekistani judoka. He competed in the men's half-lightweight event at the 1996 Summer Olympics.
