= Oscar Ramón =

Andorran sailor

Oscar Ramón Borra
Personal information
- Born: 27 July 1971 (age 54) El Pas de la Casa, Andorra

Sport
- Country: Andorra
- Sport: Sailing (sport)
- Event: 470 (dinghy)

Oscar Ramón Borra (born 27 July 1971) is an Andorran sailor who competed in the 1992 Summer Olympics and the 1996 Summer Olympics.

Oscar Ramón competed in the two man 470 (dinghy) class with his younger brother David Ramón in both Olympics, at the 1992 Summer Olympics in the 470 class the pair finished in 27th place after all seven races, their best finish was 2nd place in race five. Four years later again in the 470 class the brothers finished again in 27th place at the 1996 Summer Olympics.
