= Xavier Pérez =

Andorran cyclist

Personal information
- Born: 15 January 1968 (age 58) Escaldes-Engordany, Andorra

Cycling career
- Sport: Cycling
- Current team: Retired
- Discipline: Road
- Role: Rider

Professional team
- 1993–1994: Festina–Lotus

Xavier Pérez Font (born 15 January 1968) is an Andorran former cyclist. He competed at the 1988 Summer Olympics and the 1992 Summer Olympics. He also rode in the 1993 Giro d'Italia, but failed to finish.
