= Emili Pérez =

Andorran cyclist

Personal information
- Born: 3 October 1966 (age 60) Escaldes-Engordany, Andorra

Cycling career
- Sport: Cycling
- Current team: Retired
- Discipline: Road
- Role: Rier

Professional team
- 1993: Festina–Lotus

Emili Pérez Font (born 3 October 1966) is an Andorran former cyclist. He competed at the 1988 Summer Olympics and the 1992 Summer Olympics.
