= Victor Gómez (alpine skier) =

Andorran alpine skier (born 1974)

Personal information
- Full name: Victor Gómez Javalera
- Born: 10 February 1974 (age 52) Andorra la Vella, Andorra

Sport
- Country: Andorra
- Sport: Alpine skiing

Victor Gómez Javalera (Note: In this Catalan name, the first or paternal surname is Gómez and the second or maternal family name is Javalera; both are generally joined by the conjunction "i".) (born 10 February 1974) is an Andorran alpine skier. He competed at the 1992, 1994, 1998 and the 2002 Winter Olympics.

== Notes ==
Olympic Games
Preceded by Aitor Osorio	Flag bearer for Andorra; Nagano 1998	Succeeded by Antoni Bernadó
Preceded by Antoni Bernadó	Flag bearer for Andorra; Salt Lake 2002	Succeeded by Hocine Haciane
