= Esteve Dolsa =

Andorran trap shooter

Esteve Dolsa Montaña
Personal information
- Born: 17 March 1936
- Died: 22 November 2007 (aged 71) Lleida

Sport
- Sport: Sports shooting

Esteve Dolsa Montaña (17 March 1936 - 22 November 2007) was an Andorran trap shooter who competed in the 1976 Summer Olympics.

Dolsa was 40 years old when he competed in the trap shooting event at the 1976 Summer Olympics with fellow countryman Joan Tomàs Roca, in the event Dolsa scored 159 points and finished in 35th position out of 43 shooters.

While out hunting on the 22 November 2007 in Lleida, he was accidentally shot and died from his wound.
