= David Ramón =

Andorran sailor

David Ramón Borra
Personal information
- Born: 13 April 1974 (age 52) El Pas de la Casa, Andorra

Sport
- Country: Andorra
- Sport: Sailing (sport)
- Event: 470 (dinghy)

David Ramón Borra (born 13 April 1974) is an Andorran sailor who competed in the 1992 Summer Olympics and the 1996 Summer Olympics.

David Ramón competed in the two man 470 (dinghy) class with his older brother Oscar Ramón in both Olympics, at the 1992 Summer Olympics in the 470 class the pair finished in 27th place after all seven races, their best finish was 2nd place in race five. Four years later again in the 470 class the brothers finished again in 27th place at the 1996 Summer Olympics.
