= Josep Graells =

Andorran middle-distance runner

Personal information
- Full name: Josep Graells Esquius
- Born: 1 February 1964 (age 62) Les Escaldes, Andorra
- Height: 170 cm (5 ft 7 in)
- Weight: 62 kg (137 lb)

Sport
- Country: Andorra
- Sport: Middle-distance running

Josep Graells Esquius (Note: In this Catalan name, the first or paternal surname is Graells and the second or maternal family name is Esquius; both are generally joined by the conjunction "i".) (born 1 February 1964) is an Andorran Olympic middle-distance runner. He represented his country in the men's 1500 meters and the men's 800 meters at the 1988 Summer Olympics. His time was a 1:53.34 in the 800, and a 3:52.68 in the 1500 heats.

Graells was the flag bearer for Andorra in the Seoul 1988 opening ceremony.
