= Montserrat García =

Andorran canoeist

Personal information
- Full name: Montserrat García Riberaygua
- Born: 26 November 1989 (age 36) Andorra la Vella, Andorra

Sport
- Country: Andorra
- Sport: Canoe slalom
- Event: K-1 (kayak single)

Montserrat García Riberaygua (Note: In this Catalan name, the first or paternal surname is García and the second or maternal family name is Riberaygua; both are generally joined by the conjunction "i".) (born 26 November 1989 in Andorra la Vella) is an Andorran slalom canoer who has competed since the mid-2000s. She was eliminated in the qualifying round of the K-1 event at the 2008 Summer Olympics in Beijing, finishing in 20th place.

== Notes ==
Olympic Games
Preceded by Alex Antor	Flag bearer for Andorra; Beijing 2008	Succeeded by Lluís Marín
