= Meritxell Sabaté =

Andorran swimmer

Personal information
- Full name: Meritxell Sabaté González
- Nationality: Andorra
- Born: 8 September 1980 (age 45) Andorra la Vella, Andorra
- Height: 1.71 m (5 ft 7 in)
- Weight: 65 kg (143 lb)

Sport
- Sport: Swimming
- Strokes: Freestyle, medley

Meritxell Sabaté González (Note: In this Catalan name, the first or paternal surname is Sabaté and the second or maternal family name is González; both are generally joined by the conjunction "i".) (born September 8, 1980) is an Andorran former swimmer, who specialized in long-distance freestyle and individual medley events. She represented Andorra in two editions of the Olympic Games (1996 and 2000), and also held numerous national records in long-distance freestyle (both 400 and 800 m) and medley double (both 200 and 400 m).

Sabaté made her first Andorran team, as a 16-year-old teen, at the 1996 Summer Olympics in Atlanta. She failed to reach the top 16 final in the 200 m individual medley, finishing in forty-second place at 2:37.38.

At the 2000 Summer Olympics in Sydney, Sabate swam only in the 200 m individual medley. She established an Andorran record and a FINA B-cut of 2:23.24 from the Mare Nostrum Meet in Barcelona, Spain. She participated in heat one against three other swimmers Marina Mulyayeva of Kazakhstan, Alexandra Zertsalova of Kyrgyzstan, and Fernanda Cuadra of Nicaragua. Entering the race with the fastest-seeded time, Sabaté faded down the stretch to touch the wall with a third-place time of 2:30.41, but missed a chance to lower her own national record by 7.17 seconds. Sabaté failed to advance into the semifinals, as she placed thirty-fifth overall in the prelims.
