= Aitor Osorio =

Andorran swimmer

Personal information
- Full name: Joan Aitor Osorio Marti
- Nationality: Andorra
- Born: 31 October 1975 (age 51) Escaldes-Engordany, Andorra

Sport
- Sport: Swimming
- Strokes: Butterfly

Joan Aitor Osorio Marti (Note: In this Catalan name, the first or paternal surname is Osorio and the second or maternal family name is Marti; both are generally joined by the conjunction "i".) (born 31 October 1975) is an Andorran swimmer who competed at the 1996 Summer Olympics.

== Biography ==
Osorio was 20 years old when he represented his country at the 1996 Summer Olympics. He competed in the 200 metre butterfly event. He swam his heat in 2:12.59 minutes and finished 42nd overall, so he didn't qualify for the finals.

Osorio would later become the president of the Andorran Swimming Federation.

== Notes ==
Olympic Games
Preceded by Vicky Grau	Flag bearer for Andorra; Atlanta 1996	Succeeded by Victor Gómez
