= Antoni Bernadó =

Andorran long-distance runner (born 1966)

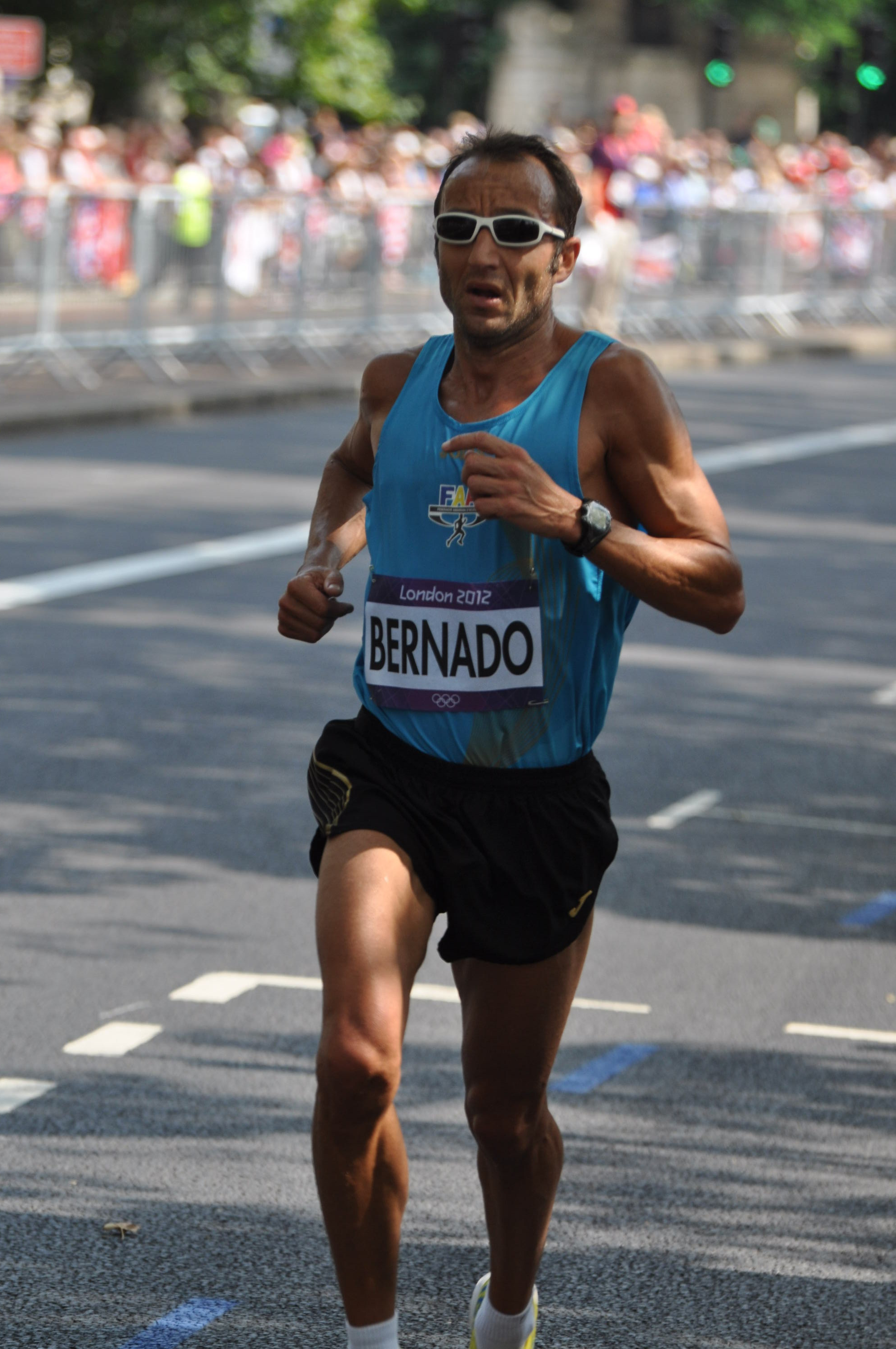
- Bernadó in the marathon at the 2012 Olympics in London

Personal information
- Full name: Antoni Bernadó Planas
- Nickname: Toni
- Born: 9 December 1966 (age 59) Sant Julià de Lòria, Andorra
- Height: 1.75 m (5 ft 9 in)
- Weight: 64 kg (141 lb)

Sport
- Country: Andorra
- Sport: Athletics
- Event: Marathon
Medal record
Representing Andorra
Games of the Small States of Europe
Gold medal – first place	Liechtenstein 1999	10000 m
Gold medal – first place	San Marino 2001	10000 m
Gold medal – first place	San Marino 2001	5000 m
Gold medal – first place	Malta 2003	10000 m
Gold medal – first place	Malta 2003	5000 m
Gold medal – first place	Andorra 2005	5000 m
Gold medal – first place	Monaco 2007	5000 m
Gold medal – first place	Liechtenstein 2011	10000 m
Silver medal – second place	Andorra 2005	10000 m
Silver medal – second place	Monaco 2007	10000 m
Silver medal – second place	Liechtenstein 2011	5000 m
Bronze medal – third place	San Marino 2017	10000 m
- Updated on 16 April 2017

Antoni "Toni" Bernadó Planas (Note: In this Catalan name, the first or paternal surname is Bernadó and the second or maternal family name is Planas; both are generally joined by the conjunction "i".) (born 9 December 1966) is an Andorran long-distance runner who finished 87th in Men's marathon at the 1996 Summer Olympics, 49th at the 2000 Summer Olympics, 57th at the 2004 Summer Olympics, 58th at the 2008 Summer Olympics and 74th at the 2012 Summer Olympics. He is the first and so far only athlete to have finished five Olympic Marathons. He held the Masters M40 3000 metres world record for three years.

== Personal bests ==
- 3000 metres – 8:03.69 (Palafrugell 2007)
- 5000 metres – 14:10.06 (Mataró 2005)
- 10,000 metres – 29:47.74 (Vic 2002)
- Half marathon – 1:05:24 (Barcelona 2005)
- Marathon – 2:14:25 (Barcelona 2003)

== Competition record ==
Year	Competition	Venue	Position	Event	Notes
Representing Andorra
1996	Olympic Games	Atlanta, United States	87th	Marathon	2:31:28
1998	World Cross Country Championships	Marrakesh, Morocco	125th	Long race	
1999	Games of the Small States of Europe	Schaan, Liechtenstein	1st	10,000 m	30:52.13
2000	World Cross Country Championships	Vilamoura, Portugal	114th	Long race	
2000	Olympic Games	Sydney, Australia	49th	Marathon	2:23:03
2001	Games of the Small States of Europe	Serravalle, San Marino	2nd	5000 m	14:41.87
2001	Games of the Small States of Europe	Serravalle, San Marino	1st	10,000 m	32:01.90
2001	Mediterranean Games	Radès, Tunisia	14th	5000 m	14:51.62
2001	Mediterranean Games	Radès, Tunisia	8th	10,000 m	30:54.84
2002	World Half Marathon Championships	Brussels, Belgium	61st	Half marathon	1:05:29
2002	European Championships	Munich, Germany	25th	Marathon	2:23:13
2003	Games of the Small States of Europe	Marsa, Malta	1st	5000 m	14:29.93
2003	Games of the Small States of Europe	Marsa, Malta	1st	10,000 m	30:57.33
2003	World Championships	Paris, France	36th	Marathon	2:16:19
2004	Olympic Games	Athens, Greece	57th	Marathon	2:23:55
2005	Games of the Small States of Europe	Andorra la Vella, Andorra	1st	5000 m	14:39.46
2005	Games of the Small States of Europe	Andorra la Vella, Andorra	2nd	10,000 m	31:40.85
2005	World Championships	Helsinki, Finland	26th	Marathon	2:19:06
2006	European Championships	Gothenburg, Sweden	23rd	Marathon	2:17:37
2007	Games of the Small States of Europe	Fontvieille, Monaco	1st	5000 m	14:17.08
2007	Games of the Small States of Europe	Fontvieille, Monaco	2nd	10,000 m	30:12.61
2007	World Championships	Osaka, Japan	48th	Marathon	2:34:28
2008	Olympic Games	Beijing, China	58th	Marathon	2:26:29
2010	European Championships	Barcelona, Spain	33rd	Marathon	2:30:52
2011	Games of the Small States of Europe	Schaan, Liechtenstein	2nd	5000 m	14:46.15
2011	Games of the Small States of Europe	Schaan, Liechtenstein	1st	10,000 m	30:57.70
2012	Olympic Games	London, United Kingdom	74th	Marathon	2:28:34
2013	Games of the Small States of Europe	Luxembourg, Luxembourg	4th	5000 m	14:53.68
2013	Games of the Small States of Europe	Luxembourg, Luxembourg	4th	10,000 m	31:15.40
2017	Games of the Small States of Europe	Serravalle, San Marino	6th	5000 m	15:28.69
2017	Games of the Small States of Europe	Serravalle, San Marino	3rd	10,000 m	33:56.17
2018	World Half Marathon Championships	Valencia, Spain	131st	Half Marathon	1:10:19

== Notes ==
Olympic Games
Preceded by Victor Gómez	Flag bearer for Andorra; Sydney 2000	Succeeded by Victor Gómez
