= Joan Tomàs (sport shooter) =

Andorran sport shooter

Personal information
- Born: 17 February 1951 (age 75)

Sport
- Sport: Sports shooting

Joan Tomàs Roca (born 17 February 1951) is an Andorran trap shooter who competed in five Summer Olympics spanning 36 years.

Tomàs started practicing shooting in 1971, and two years later, he started to compete in events.

Tomàs was 25 years old when he made his first appearance in the Olympics, when he competed in the mixed trap event at the 1976 Summer Olympics in Montreal, where he scored 162 points and finished in 33rd place. At the 1980 and 1984 Summer Olympics he had his best Olympic results, when he finished in 26th place at both Games. It was 16 years before Tomàs returned to the Olympic scene, when he competed in the trap event at the 2000 Summer Olympics. He went on to finish in 39th place out of 41 shooters. His final Olympic appearance was at the 2012 Summer Olympics in London aged 61 when he again competed in the trap event, finishing in 33rd place out of 34 shooters.

Tomàs was also his country's flag bearer at the 1984 Summer Olympics and the 2012 Summer Olympics.

In addition to his five Olympic appearances, he also competed in nine ISSF World Shooting Championships, with his best finish of 69th in 2003, and 15 ISSF European Shooting Championships, with his best finish of 38th in 2000.

He is married with two children, and works in insurance, and shoots for the Mollet Club in Barcelona, his younger brother Esteve Tomàs competed in the giant slalom at the 1976 Winter Olympics.

Olympic Games
| Preceded by Lluís Marín | Flag bearer for Andorra; London 2012 | Succeeded by Mireia Gutiérrez |
