= Andorran Olympic Committee =

National Olympic Committee

- Country: Andorra
- Code: AND
- Created: 1971
- Recognized: 1975
- Continental Association: EOC
- Headquarters: Andorra la Vella, Andorra
- President: Jaume Marti Mandico
- Secretary General: Josep Antoni Guerra Alvarez
- Website: www.coa.ad

The Andorran Olympic Committee (Catalan: Comitè Olímpic Andorrà, COA; IOC Code: AND) is the National Olympic Committee representing Andorra.

== History ==
Andorran Olympic Committee in Andorra la Vella

The Andorran Olympic Committee was created in 1971 and recognized by the IOC in 1975.

== Member federations ==
The Andorran National Federations are the organizations that coordinate all aspects of their individual sports. They are responsible for training, competition and development of their sports. There are currently 20 Olympic Summer and 3 Winter Sport Federations and six Non-Olympic Sports Federations in Andorra.

=== Olympic Sport federations ===
National Federation	Summer or Winter	Headquarters
Andorran Archery Association	Summer	Andorra la Vella
Andorran Athletics Federation	Summer	Ordino
Andorran Basketball Federation	Summer	Andorra la Vella
Andorran Canoeing Association	Summer	Andorra la Vella
Andorran Cycling Federation	Summer	Ordino
Andorran Equestrian Federation	Summer	Ordino
Andorran Football Federation	Summer	Escaldes-Engordany
Andorran Golf Association	Summer	Escaldes-Engordany
Andorran Gymnastics Federation	Summer	Ordino
Andorran Handball Federation	Summer	Ordino
Andorran Federation of Ice Sports	Winter	Canillo
Andorran Judo Federation	Summer	Ordino
Andorran Karate Federation	Summer	Ordino
Andorran Rugby Federation	Summer	Andorra la Vella
Andorran Sailing Federation	Summer	Andorra la Vella
Andorran Shooting Federation	Summer	Andorra la Vella
Andorran Ski Federation	Winter	Andorra la Vella
Andorran Federation of Ski-Mountaineering	Winter	Ordino
Andorran Swimming Federation	Summer	Ordino
Andorran Table Tennis Federation	Summer	Encamp
Andorran Taekwondo Federation	Summer	Ordino
Andorran Tennis Federation	Summer	Andorra la Vella
Andorran Volleyball Federation	Summer	Ordino

=== Non-Olympic Sport federations ===
National Federation	Headquarters
Automobile Club of Andorra	Andorra la Vella
Andorran Chess Federation	Ordino
Andorran Motorcycle Federation	Sant Julià de Lòria
Andorran Pétanque Federation	Ordino
Andorran Roller Sports Federation	Ordino
Special Olympics Andorra	Ordino

== See also ==
- Andorra at the Olympics
