= Health in Andorra =

Life expectancy in Andorra was 79.8 for men and 85.2 years for women in 2010.

A new measure of expected human capital calculated for 195 countries from 1990 to 2016 and defined for each birth cohort as the expected years lived from age 20 to 64 years and adjusted for educational attainment, learning or education quality, and functional health status was published by The Lancet in September 2018. Andorra had the eighteenth highest level of expected human capital with 24 health, education, and learning-adjusted expected years lived between age 20 and 64 years.

Andorra became a member of the World Health Organization on January 14, 1997.

== Healthcare ==
The Andorran health care system was set up on 24 September 1918 in response to the Spanish flu pandemic. Before that each commune was responsible for contracting physicians and for such regulation on health care issues as they chose. Under the Health Care Administration Ordinance of 9 May 1931 the parish health boards were given statutory status.

In The Lancet's Healthcare Access and Quality Index, which ranked 195 countries' healthcare systems between 1990 and 2015 the country scored 95/100, the best in the world.

Healthcare in Andorra is provided to all employed persons and their families by the government-run social security system, Caixa Andorrana de Seguretat Social, which is funded by employer and employee contributions in respect of salaries. The cost of healthcare is covered at rates of 75% for outpatient expenses such as medicines and hospital visits, 90% for hospitalisation, and 100% for work-related accidents. The remainder of the costs may be covered by private health insurance. Other residents and tourists require full private health insurance.

The main hospital, Nostra Senyora de Meritxell Hospital, is in Escaldes-Engordany. There are also 12 primary health care centres run by Servei Andorrà d’Atenció Sanitària, the Andorran Health Care Service, in various locations around the principality. For specialist treatment patients may be sent to Barcelona or Toulouse.
