= Engordany =

Village in Escaldes-Engordany, Andorra

- Location in Andorra
- Coordinates: 42°31′N 1°33′E
- Country: Andorra
- Parish: Escaldes-Engordany
- Elevation: 3,638 ft (1,109 m)

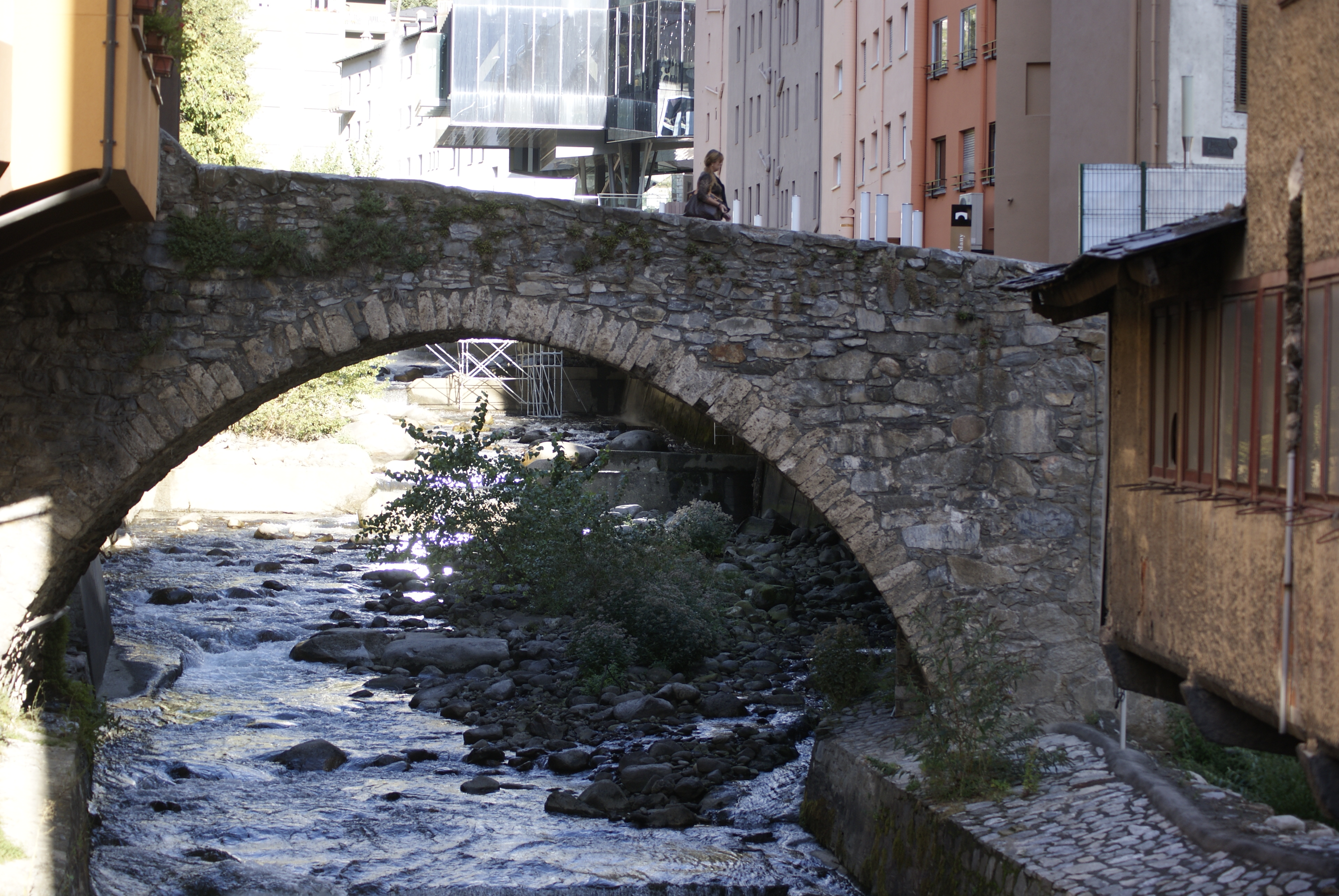
Pont d'Ergordany, a heritage bridge in Engordany

Engordany (Catalan pronunciation: [əŋɡuɾˈðaɲ]) is a village in Andorra, located in the parish of Escaldes-Engordany. It is contiguous with Les Escaldes and Andorra la Vella.

The village has a tradition of staging street theatre which is popular with tourists. Catalan writer Esteve Albert organised a live nativity play in Engordany involving all the villagers. In 2024, amateur actors from the Animal School of Theater staged performances of "Tourists and Bathers", a street show depicting ten scenes from the parish's history as a destination for visitors seeking its thermal waters.
