= 2006–07 Segona Divisió =

Segona Divisió
- Season: 2006-07
- Dates: 23 September 2006 - 20 May 2007
- Champions: Casa Estrella Del Benfica
- Promoted: Casa Estrella Del Benfica; UE Engordany
- Matches: 69
- Goals: 278 (4.03 per match)

The 2006-07 Segona Divisió was the eighth season of the Segona Divisió, the second tier of football in Andorra. The season began on 23 September 2006 and finished on 20 May 2007. Casa Estrella Del Benfica won the division and were promoted to the 2007–08 Primera Divisió. UE Engordany won a promotion/relegation playoff against FC Encamp and were also promoted to the 2007–08 Primera Divisió.

== League format ==
The league consisted of eight teams playing each other twice. After fourteen games the top four clubs retained their record and entered a play off. The play off consisted on each side playing each other twice. The top team became champions and won promotion to the 2007–08 Primera Divisió. The next highest placed team entered a playoff against the seventh placed team in the 2006–07 Primera Divisió. B teams were ineligible for promotion.

== Teams ==
The following eight clubs comprised the Segona Divisió in 2006-07:

Official Club Name	Home City	Stadium Name
UE Engordany	Escaldes-Engordany	Estadio Comunal de Aixovall
Estrella Casa del Benfica	Andorra la Vella	Estadio Comunal de Aixovall
UE Extremenya	La Massana	Estadio Comunal de Aixovall
FC Lusitanos II	Andorra la Vella	Estadio Comunal de Aixovall
CE Principat II	Andorra la Vella	Estadio Comunal de Aixovall
FC Ranger's II	Andorra la Vella	Estadio Comunal de Aixovall
FC Santa Coloma II	Santa Coloma	Estadio Comunal de Aixovall
Sporting Escaldes	Escaldes-Engordany	Estadio Comunal de Aixovall

== League table ==
Each team played each other twice with the top four qualifying for the playoff.

Pos	Team	Pld	W	D	L	GF	GA	GD	Pts	Qualification
1	Casa Estrella del Benfica	14	10	3	1	25	12	+13	33	Advance to play-off round
2	Santa Coloma II	14	8	4	2	38	18	+20	28	Advance to play-off round
3	UE Engordany	14	7	4	3	29	19	+10	25	Advance to play-off round
4	CE Principat II	14	6	4	4	35	27	+8	22	Advance to play-off round
5	UE Extremenya	14	4	3	7	30	29	+1	15	
6	Sporting Escaldes	14	4	1	9	19	38	−19	13	
7	FC Lusitanos II	14	3	3	8	26	41	−15	12	
8	FC Ranger's II	14	3	0	11	17	35	−18	9	

Source: GSA

== Playoff ==
Casa Estrella del Benfica were crowned champions and promoted to the following season's Primera Divisió. The next highest placed team entered a playoff against the seventh placed team in the 2006–07 Primera Divisió. B teams were ineligible for promotion. This meant that third placed UE Engordany took part in the playoff instead of second placed Santa Coloma B.

Pos	Team	Pld	W	D	L	GF	GA	GD	Pts	Promotion or qualification
1	Casa Estrella del Benfica (C, P)	20	14	4	2	38	16	+22	46	Promotion to Primera Divisió
2	Santa Coloma II	20	10	5	5	47	33	+14	35	
3	UE Engordany (P)	20	9	5	6	46	33	+13	32	Qualification to Primera Divisió play-offs
4	CE Principat II	20	8	5	7	46	44	+2	29	

Source: GSA
(C) Champions; (P) Promoted

== Promotion/relegation playoff ==
UE Engordany won and were promoted to the next season's Primera Divisió.

Team 1	Agg.	Team 2	1st leg	2nd leg
UE Engordany	5–4	FC Encamp	2–1	3–3
