= Rosa Gili Casals =

Rosa Gili
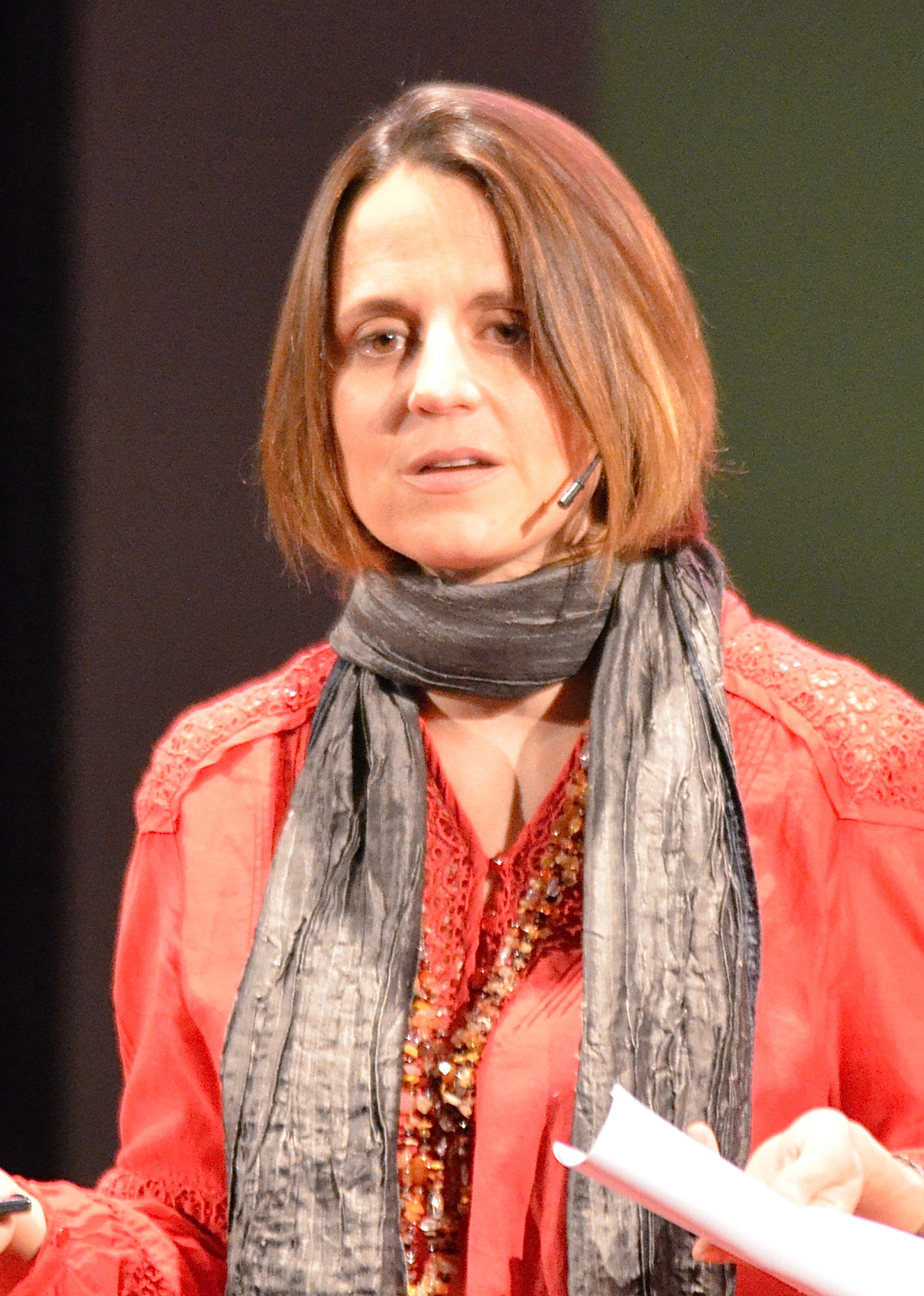
- Born: 28 July 1972 (age 53); Les Escaldes
- Other name: Rosa Gili Casals
- Occupation: politician
- Political party: Social Democratic Party till 2021

Rosa Gili Casals or Rosa Gili (born 28 July 1972) is an Andorran academic and politician. She became a consul major of the parish of Escaldes–Engordany in 2019.

== Life ==
Gili was born in Les Escaldes in 1972 and graduated as a chemist.

In 2009 Gili became a General Counselor. She served on the Legislative Commission for Social Affairs and the Legislative Commission for Education, Culture, Youth and Sports until 2011.

She became consul major of Escaldes-Engordany in 2019.

She left the Social Democratic Party in 2021 because of differences over policy. The party were said to have been surprised at her decision but Gili was keen to point out that she had not changed.

On 8 May 2025 she was celebrating in Escaldes–Engordany at the feast of Sant Miquel d’Engolasters as the local people had decided to take a day's holiday to celebrate starting that year. In the same month she ordered that an artwork be removed from an exhibition on the grounds of national security. The artwork in question featured a cover of the Charlie Hebdo magazine. It was part of an exhibition by Tatxo Benet at the Espai Caldes museum in Andorra and the whole exhibition was eventually closed. The announcement confirmed the support for freedom of expression but the security concerns were paramount.

== Private life ==
She and her partner have two children.
