= Meritxell (given name) =

Maria de Meritxell (Catalan pronunciation: [məˈɾi.ə ðə məɾiˈtʃeʎ]), usually just Meritxell and informally shortened to Meri or Txell, is a feminine given name referring to Our Lady of Meritxell, patron saint of Andorra. It is common in Andorra and frequent in Catalonia. Notable people with the name include:

- Meritxell Batet (born 1973), Spanish politician
- Meritxell Borràs (born 1964), Spanish politician
- Meritxell Budó (born 1969), Spanish politician
- Meritxell Colell Aparicio (born 1983), Spanish film director
- Meritxell Ferré (born 2006), Spanish synchronized swimmer
- Meritxell Font (born 2004), Spanish footballer
- Meritxell Huch (born 1978), Spanish stem cell biologist
- Meritxell Mas (born 1994), Spanish synchronized swimmer
- Meritxell Mateu i Pi (born 1966), Andorran politician
- Meritxell Negre (1971–2020), Spanish singer-songwriter
- Meritxell Palmitjavila Naudí (born 1964), Andorran politician
- Meritxell Sabaté (born 1980), Andorran swimmer
- Meritxell Serret (born 1975), Spanish politician

== See also ==
- Nostra Senyora de Meritxell Hospital, the only hospital in Andorra
