= Pilar Burgués Monserrat =

Andorran writer (1958–2026)

Pilar Burgués Monserrat (1958 – 24 October 2026) was an Andorran short story writer. She worked on the literary review Ex-libris Casa Bauró, and at the National Library of Andorra on the bibliography and publication catalogue of the government of Andorra, producing some publications which became standard references. Burgués Monserrat published two collections of short stories, and was awarded the Àgora Cultura Prize in 2022.

== Life and career ==
Burgués Monserrat came from a family of doctors, and was born in Escaldes-Engordany, in 1958. Her parents are from the Matarraña region originally. Monserrat received her diploma in geography and history from the University of Zaragoza. As a student she participated in archeological excavations at Sant Vicenç d'Enclar, led by Xavier Llovera and Jordi Guillament. She returned to Andorra, working first as a teacher, which she did not enjoy. She worked from 1983 until 2012 at the National Library of Andorra. There she worked on the literary review Ex-libris Casa Bauró, and on the bibliography and publication catalogue of the government of Andorra, producing some publications which became standard references. She published her first stories in the review Portella. Andorra, lletres, arts, and has since seen her work published in a variety of other works, such as l’Església de les Valls and the Annals de l'Institut d'Estudis Andorrans. Between 2011 and 2014 she wrote a series of autobiographical sketches that were published as Flaixos de llum blanca, with illustrations by Berta Oromí.

She was awarded the Àgora Cultura Prize in 2022. Burgués Monserrat died on 24 October 2026.

== Works ==
- Flaixos de llum blanca, in: Portella. Andorra, lletres, arts. Andorra: Col·lectiu Portella, 2012. Núm. 5, p. 30-32
- Flaixos de llum blanca. Andorra: Editorial Andorra, 2015 (ISBN 978-99920-53-76-8)
