= Juan Benlloch i Vivó =

Spanish Roman Catholic Cardinal, Co-Prince of Andorra

His Eminence Juan Bautista Benlloch i Vivó
- Archbishop of Burgos
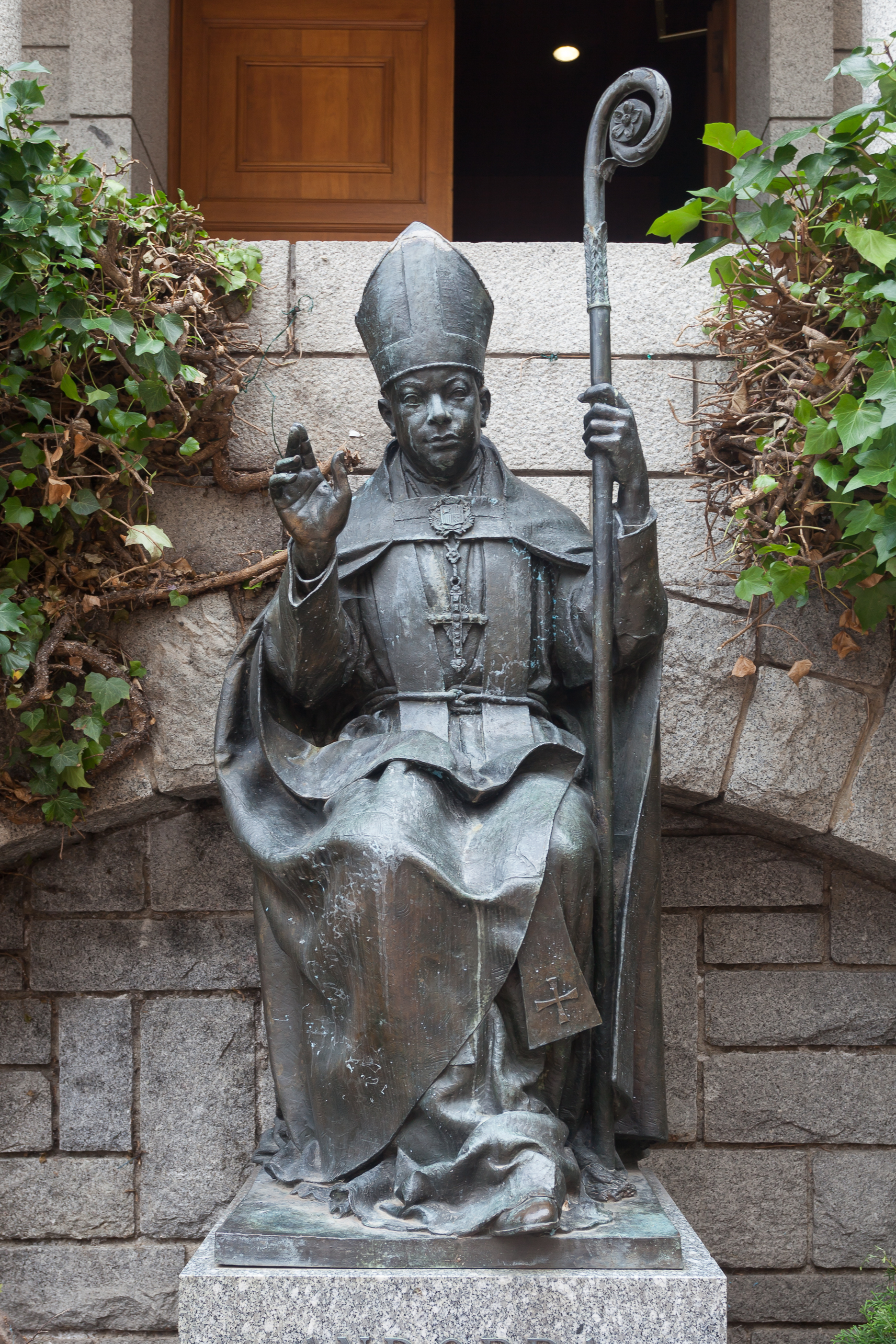
- Church: Roman Catholic Church
- Archdiocese: Burgos
- See: Burgos
- Appointed: 7 January 1919
- Term ended: 14 February 1926
- Predecessor: José Cadena y Eleta
- Successor: Pedro Segura y Sáenz
- Other post: Cardinal-Priest of Santa Maria in Ara Coeli (1921–26)
- Previous posts: Titular Bishop of Hermopolis maior (1901–06); Apostolic Administrator of Solsona (1901–06); Bishop of Urgell (1906–19)

Orders
- Ordination: 25 February 1888
- Consecration: 2 February 1902 by Jaime Cordona y Tur
- Created cardinal: 7 March 1921 by Pope Benedict XV
- Rank: Cardinal-Priest

Personal details
- Born: Juan Bautista Benlloch i Vivó; 29 December 1864 Valencia, Spanish Kingdom
- Died: 14 February 1926 (aged 61) Madrid, Kingdom of Spain
- Buried: Burgos Cathedral
- Parents: Juan Benlloch i David; Carmen Vivó Sabater

Styles of Juan Bautista Benlloch i Vivó
- Reference style: His Eminence
- Spoken style: Your Eminence
- Informal style: Cardinal
- See: Burgos

Juan Baptista Benlloch i Vivó (Eastern Catalan: [ʒuˈam bəɲˈʎɔk i βiˈβo], Valencian: [ʒuˈam beɲˈʎɔk i viˈvo]; 29 December 1864 – 14 February 1926) was a Spanish cardinal of the Roman Catholic Church who was Archbishop of Burgos from 1919, who was elevated to the cardinalate in 1921, and who, as Co-Prince of Andorra, composed the text for "El Gran Carlemany", that country's national anthem.

== Biography ==
Juan Baptista Benlloch i Vivó and his twin sister, Regina Baptista Benlloch i Vivó, were born in Valencia, Spain on 29 December 1864. He studied at its seminary and obtained his doctorate in theology and doctorate in canon law in October 1887. He was ordained to the priesthood on 25 February 1888, and was then served an auxiliary professor at the Valencia seminary and co-adjutor in Almàssera, teaching humanities and metaphysics. From 1893 to 1898, Benlloch was pastor of the parish of Santos Juan Evangelista y Bautista in Valencia. He then taught at the seminary of Segovia, where he was also chanter of the cathedral chapter, provisor and vicar general (1899–1900), and vicar capitular (1900–1901).

On 16 December 1901, Benlloch was appointed Apostolic Administrator of Solsona and titular bishop of Hermopolis Maior. He received his episcopal consecration on 2 February 1902 from Bishop Jaime Cardona y Tur, with Bishops José Cadena y Eleta and Salvador Castellote y Pinazo serving as co-consecrators, in Madrid. He was later named Bishop of Urgell on 6 December 1906; in this position, he was also Co-Prince of Andorra and composed the text of its national anthem. His tenure saw Andorra enter World War I on the side of the Allies, but it was not included in the Treaty of Versailles and officially remained in a state of belligerency until 1957. The French co-princes of Andorra during Benlloch's leadership include Armand Fallières and Raymond Poincaré.

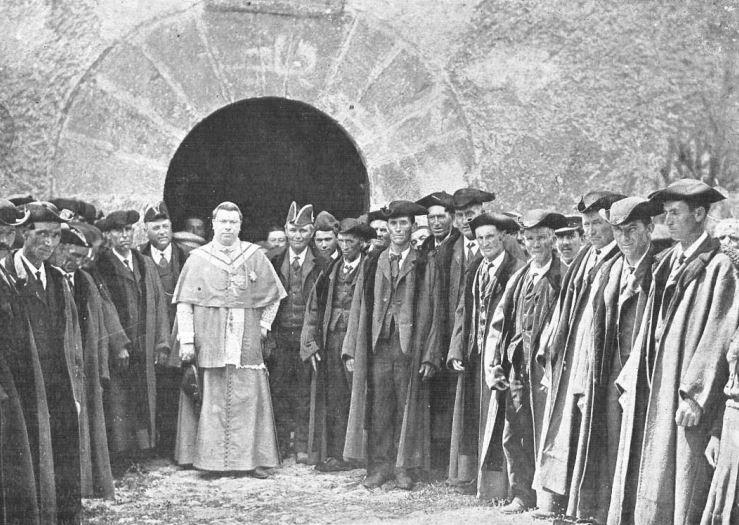
Benlloch with members of the Andorra parliament

Benlloch was eventually advanced to Archbishop of Burgos on 7 January 1919. Pope Benedict XV created him Cardinal Priest of Santa Maria in Aracoeli in the consistory of 7 March 1921.He was one of the cardinal electors who participated in the 1922 papal conclave, which selected Pope Pius XI. He was a special envoy of the Spanish government to the Latin American republics from September 1923 to January 1924.

He died in Madrid, at the age of 61. He is buried in the Real Basílica de la Virgen de los Desamparados in Valencia.

Catholic Church titles
Preceded by Juan Laguarda y Fenollera	Bishop of Urgell; 1906–1919	Succeeded by Justí Guitart i Vilardebó
Preceded by José Cadena y Eleta	Archbishop of Burgos; 1919–1926	Succeeded by Pedro Segura y Sáenz
Regnal titles
Preceded by Juan Laguarda y Fenollera	Co-Prince of Andorra; 1906–1919	Succeeded by Justí Guitart i Vilardebó
