= Pont de la Tosca =

Bridge in Escaldes-Engordany, Andorra

Coordinates: 42.5093°N 1.5455°E

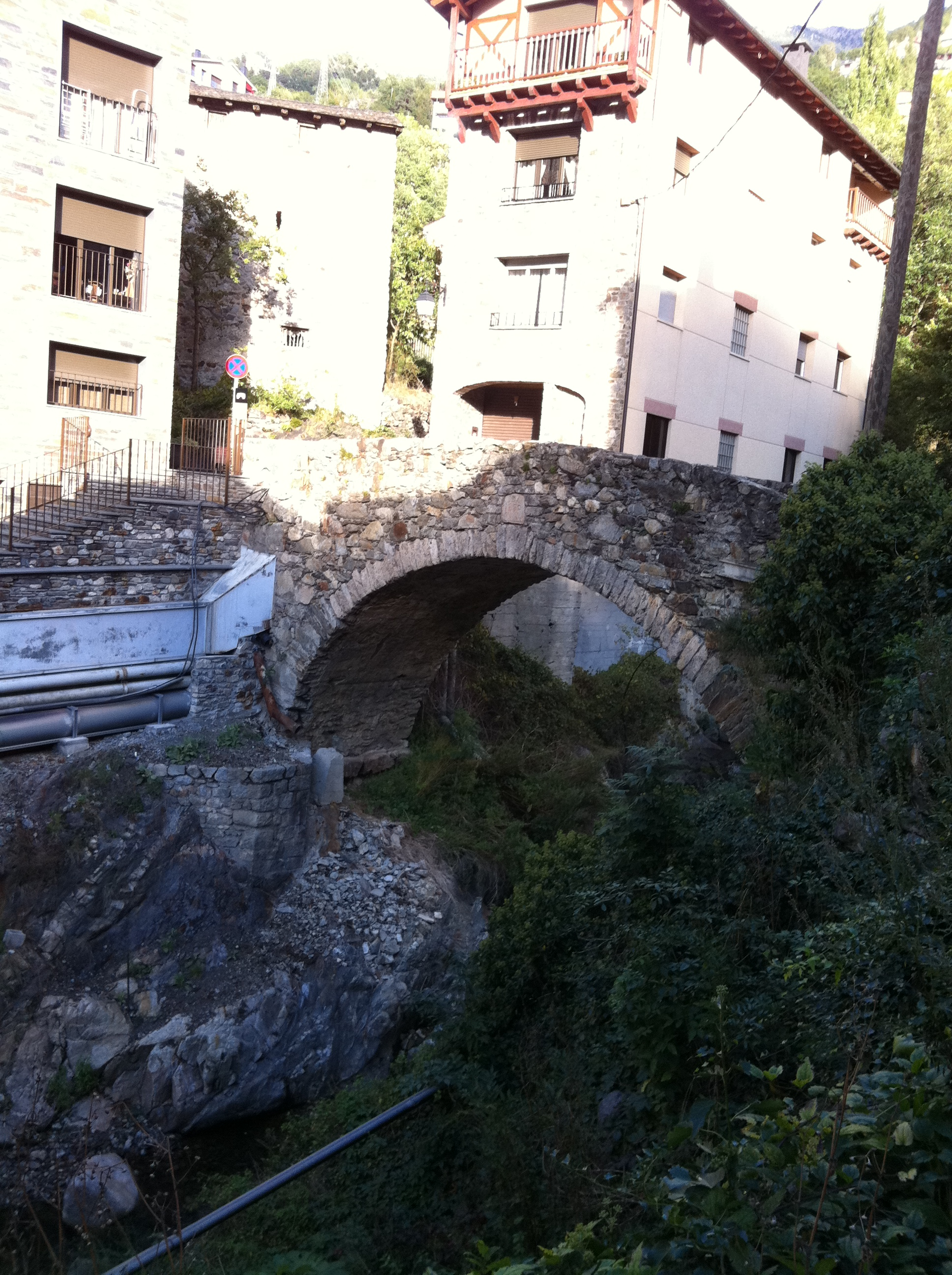
Pont de la Tosca

Pont de la Tosca is a bridge located in Escaldes-Engordany Parish, Andorra. It is a heritage property registered in the Cultural Heritage of Andorra. It was built in 1820.
