= Our Lady of Meritxell =

Andorran Roman Catholic statue of a Virgin Mary apparition

Coordinates: 42°33′14″N 1°35′25″E

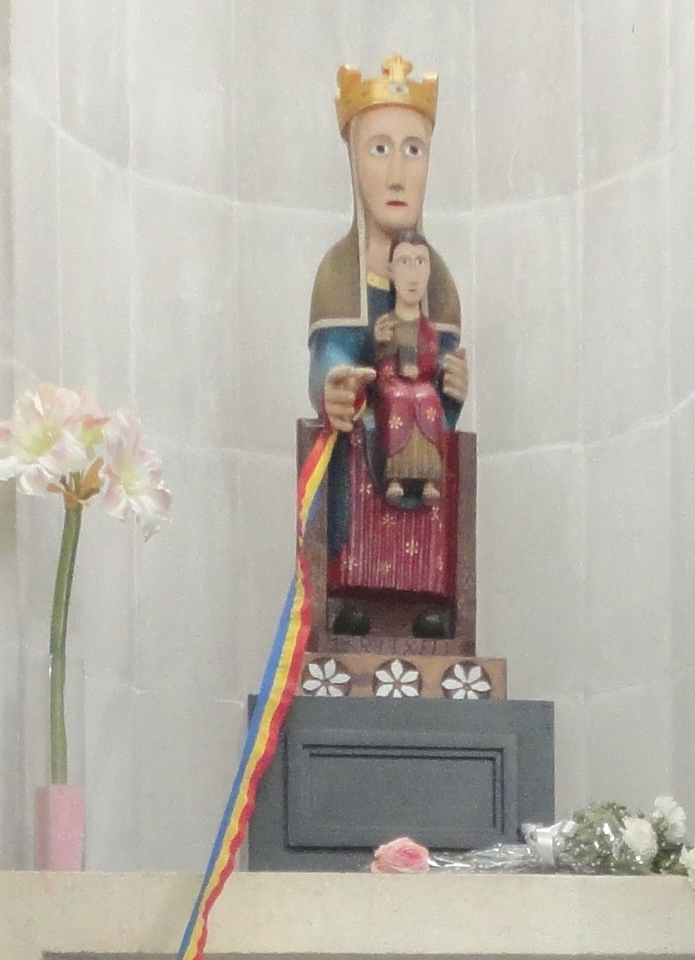
- Also called: Diada de Meritxell, festivitat de Nostra Senyora de Meritxell
- Observed by: Andorra
- Date: 8 September
- Next time: 8 September 2026
- Frequency: annual

Our Lady of Meritxell (Catalan: Mare de Déu de Meritxell [ˈmaɾə ðə ˈðew ðə məɾiˈtʃeʎ] or Nostra Senyora de Meritxell [ˈnɔstɾə səˈɲoɾə ðə məɾiˈtʃeʎ]) is an Andorran Catholic statue depicting an apparition of the Virgin Mary. Our Lady of Meritxell is the patron saint of Andorra. The original Romanesque statue dated from the late 12th century. However, the chapel in which it was housed burned down on 8 September 1972, and the statue was destroyed. A replica can be found in the new Meritxell Basilica, designed in 1976 by Ricardo Bofill Taller de Arquitectura.

The image was canonically crowned by Pope Benedict XV on 8 September 1921.

== Legend ==
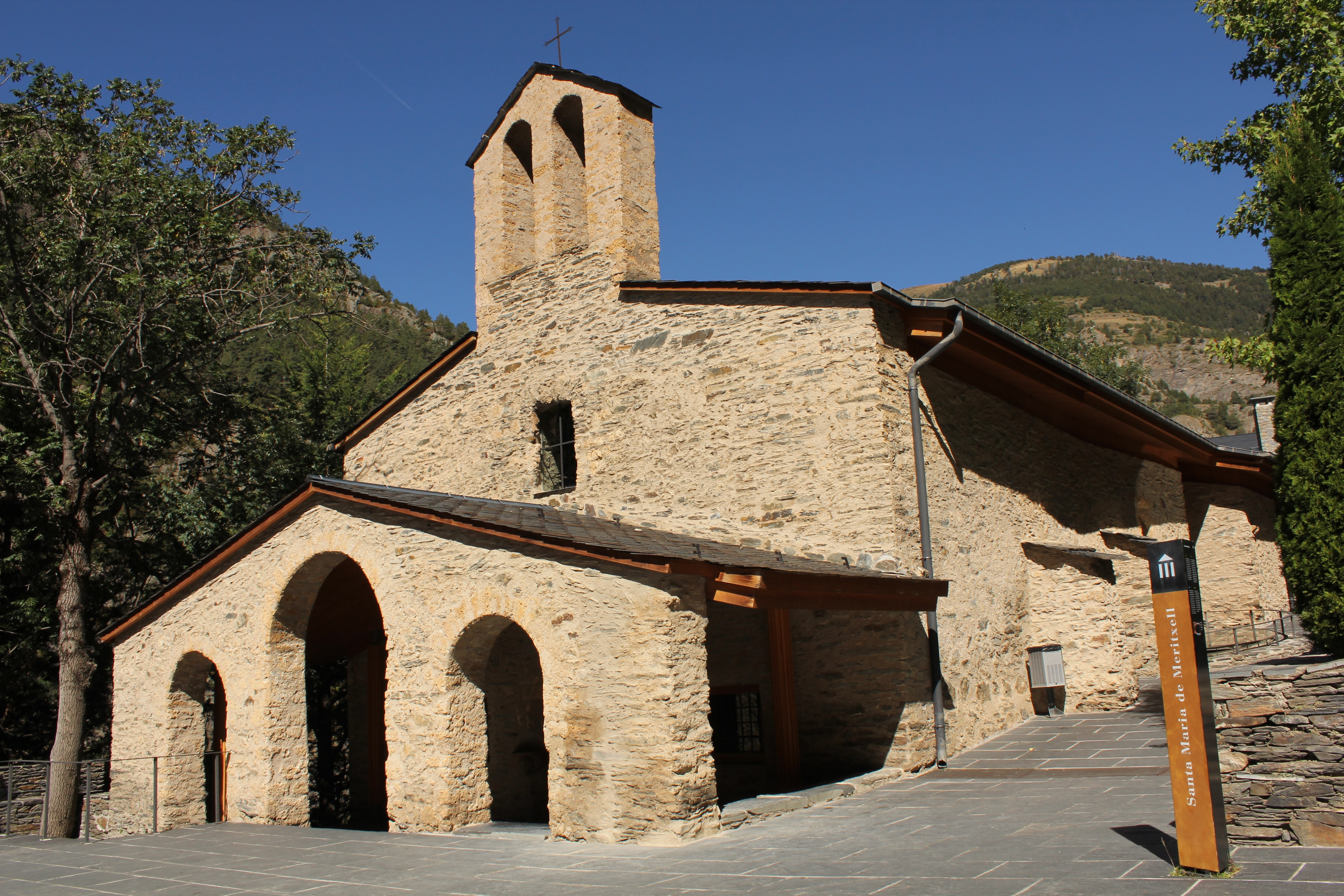
Old Sanctuary of Meritxell

According to legend, in the late 12th century, on January 6, a wild rose in bloom was found by villagers from Meritxell going to Mass in Canillo. It was out of season and at its base was found a statue of the Virgin and Child. The statue was placed in the Canillo church. However, the statue was found under the same wild rose the next day. The statue was taken to the church of Encamp. However, as before, the statue was again found under the same wild rose on the next day. As in similar legends elsewhere, the villagers of Meritxell took this as a sign and decided to build a new chapel in their town after they found an open space miraculously untouched by the winter snows.

== Influence ==
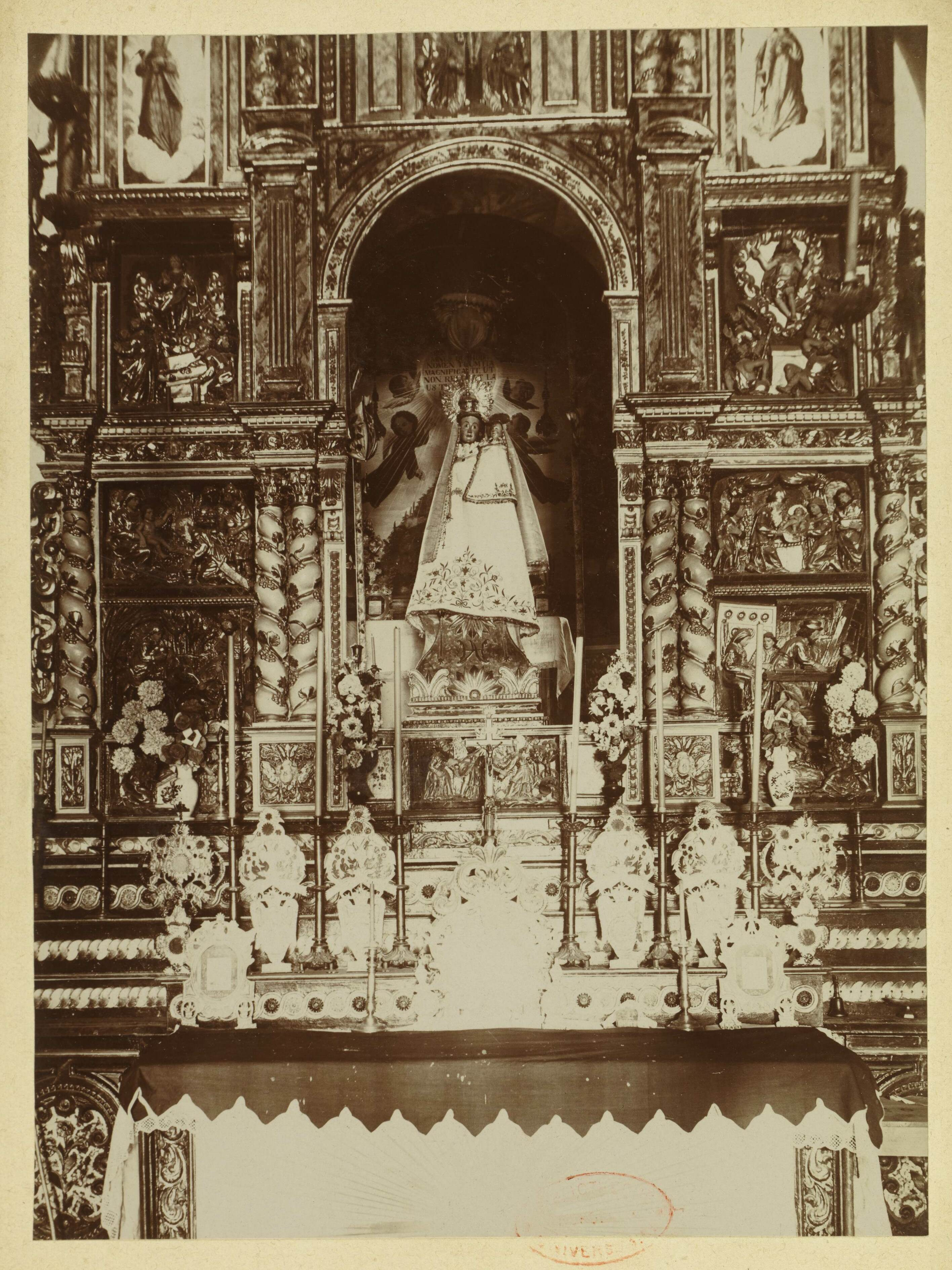
The statue that was granted a canonical coronation on 1921.

September 8 is both the feast day of Our Lady of Meritxell and the Andorran National Day. The image is mentioned in the anthem of Andorra.

Meritxell is a relatively frequent female name among Andorran women and other Catalan-speaking women. The hospital, Nostra Senyora de Meritxell Hospital, is also named after her.

== See also ==
- List of works by Ricardo Bofill Taller de Arquitectura
