= El gran Carlemany =

National anthem of Andorra

English: The Great Charlemagne
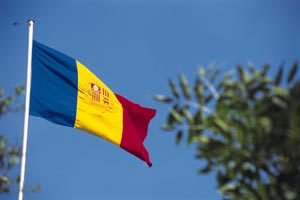
- National anthem of Andorra
- Lyrics: Juan Benlloch i Vivó
- Music: Enric Marfany Bons
- Adopted: September 1921, 08; 105 years ago

Audio sample
- Official band instrumental version in G major: file; help

"El gran Carlemany" (Western Catalan: [el ˈɣɾaŋ ˌkaɾleˈmaɲ]; "The Great Charlemagne") is the national anthem of the Principality of Andorra. Enric Marfany Bons composed the music, while the lyrics were authored by Joan Benlloch i Vivó, written in a first-person narrative from the point of view of Andorra. It was adopted as the national anthem on 8 September 1921, which is also the national day of Andorra. The lyrics make reference to several key aspects of Andorran culture and history, such as the heritage of the Carolingian Empire.

== History ==
"El Gran Carlemany" was composed by Enric Marfany Bons (1871–1942), who was a priest. The lyrics to the song were penned by Juan Benlloch i Vivó (1864–1926), who served as the Bishop of Urgell from 1906 to 1919. This position also made him an ex officio Co–Prince of Andorra. The song was officially designated as the country's national anthem on 8 September 1921, when it was sung at the country's cathedral for the first time. The day it was adopted – 8 September – is the National Day of Andorra. This coincides with the feast day of Our Lady of Meritxell, the country's patron saint, who is mentioned in the lyrics.

== Lyrics ==
The lyrics of "El Gran Carlemany" give a short account of Andorra's history "in a first-person narrative". It recounts the traditional Andorran legend that Charlemagne reconquered the region from the Moors between 788 and 790, after the Catalan people had guided his army through the rugged valleys, which Charlemagne compensated with granting Andorra its independence, and its first borders were delineated that same year. It formed part of the Marca Hispanica, a buffer zone formed by Charlemagne in order to protect his state (the Carolingian Empire). According to legend, he was responsible for restructuring the country, reintroducing Christianity to its people and overseeing the construction of monasteries. Because of these accomplishments, he was given "a mythical aura" and is regarded as the founder of Andorra.

The hymn begins with "El gran Carlemany mon pare" ("Great Charlemagne my father") and memorialises this view and celebrates the country's status as "the only remaining daughter of the Carolingian empire", since it is the only remnant of the Marca Hispanica.

Catalan original

El gran Carlemany, mon pare,
dels alarbs em (Note: Sometimes written me, which is the forma plena ("full form") of the weak (unstressed) first person singular personal pronoun, usually appended with a hyphen to verbs ending in a consonant when they are infinitives, gerunds or positive imperatives, while em is the forma reforçada ("reinforced form"), usually used before verbs starting with a consonant when they are conjugated or negative imperatives, but in some varieties of Catalan, it is replaced with the full form.) deslliurà,
i del cel vida em donà
de Meritxell, la gran Mare.

Princesa nasquí i pubilla
entre dos (Note: Sometimes written dues, which, although the feminine form in other varieties of Catalan, is not used in the Northwestern Catalan of Andorra.) nacions, neutral;
sols resto l'única filla
de l'imperi Carlemany.

Creient i lliure onze segles,
creient i lliure vull ser.
Siguin els furs mos tutors
𝄆 i mos Prínceps defensors! 𝄇

North-Western Catalan IPA (Note: See Help:IPA/Catalan and Catalan phonology.)

[el‿ɣɾan kaɾ.le.ˈmaɲ | mon ˈpa.ɾe |]
[ðelz‿a.ˈlaɾbz‿em‿ðez.ʎiw.ˈɾa |]
[i‿ðel sɛl‿ˈβi.ða‿m‿ðo.ˈna]
[ðe me.ɾi.ˈt͡ɕeʎ la‿ɣɾan ˈma.ɾe ǁ]

[pɾin.ˈse.za nas.ˈki‿i pu.ˈbi.ʎa]
[ˈen.tɾe‿ðos na.ˈsjonz‿new.ˈtɾal |]
[sɔl ˈres.to ˈlu.ni.ka ˈfi.ʎa]
[ðe lim.ˈpɛ.ɾi kaɾ.le.ˈmaɲ ǁ]

[kɾe.ˈjen i ˈʎiw.ɾe ˈon.ze ˈse.ɡles |]
[kɾe.ˈjen i ˈʎiw.ɾe‿βuʎ se ǁ]
[ˈsi.ɣin els fuɾz‿mos tu.ˈtos]
𝄆 [i mos ˈpɾin.seps de.fen.ˈsos ǁ] 𝄇

Spanish translation

El gran Carlomagno, mi padre,
me liberó de los árabes,
Y del cielo vida me dio
de Meritxell, la gran Madre.

Princesa nací y heredera
entre dos naciones, neutral;
soy la única hija que queda
del imperio Carolingio.

Creyente y libre once siglos,
creyente y libre quiero ser.
¡Sean los fueros mis tutores
𝄆 y mis Príncipes defensores! 𝄇

French translation

Le Grand Charlemagne mon père
nous délivra des arabes
et du ciel me donna la vie,
de Meritxell la grande Mère.

Je suis née princesse héritière
neutre entre deux nations;
je reste la seule fille
de l'empire Charlemagne.

Croyante et libre onze siècles,
croyante et libre je veux demeurer.
Que les fueros soient mes tuteurs
𝄆 et mes Princes mes défenseurs ! 𝄇

English translation

The great Charlemagne, my father,
liberated me from the Saracens,
and from heaven he gave me life
of Meritxell, the great Mother.

I was born a princess and heiress
between two nations, neutral;
I am the only remaining daughter
of the Carolingian empire.

Faithful and free for eleven centuries,
Faithful and free I want to be.
May the laws be my tutors
𝄆 and my Princes defenders! 𝄇
