= Els Vilars d'Engordany =

Village in Escaldes-Engordany, Andorra

Els Vilars
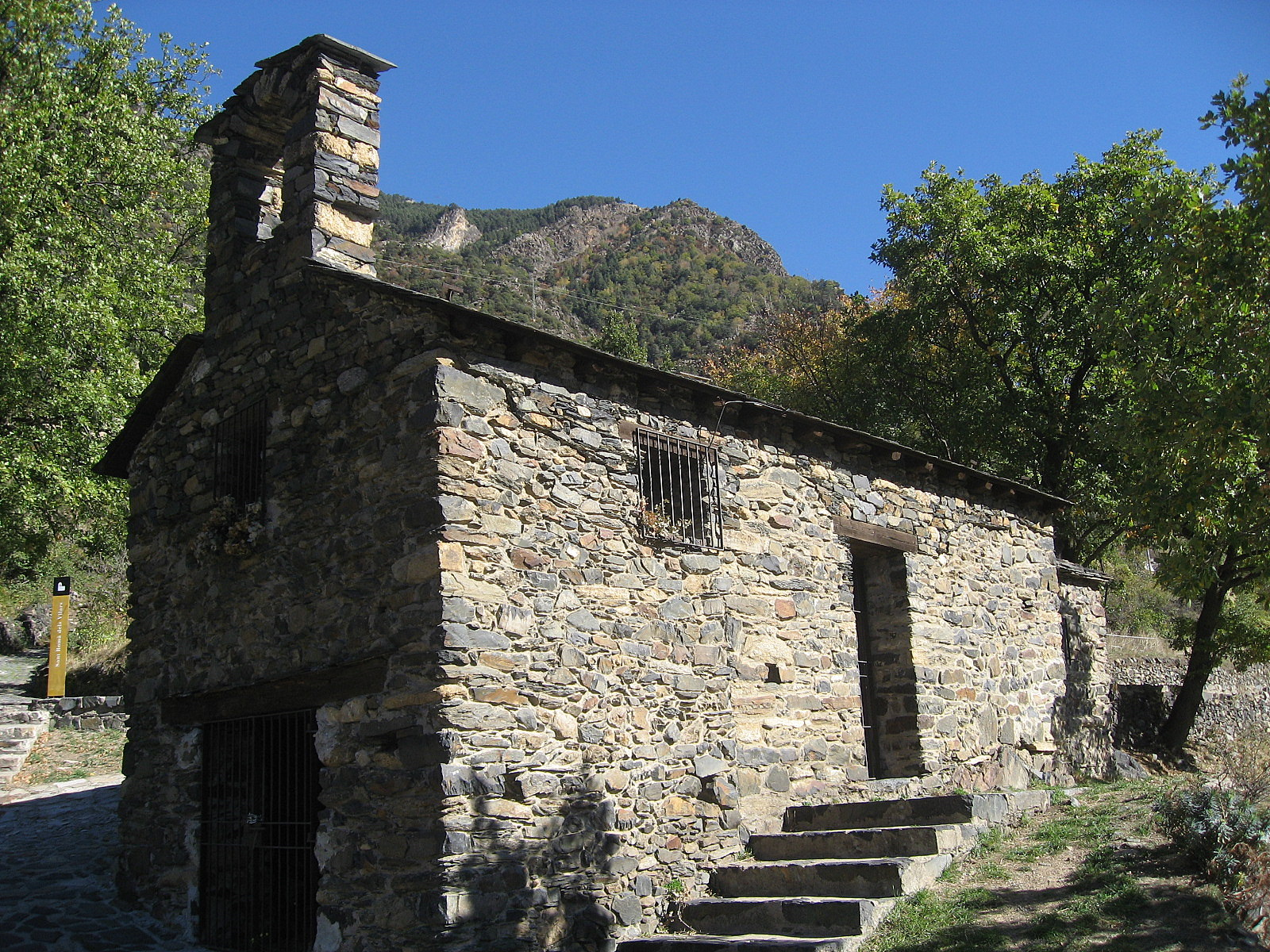
- Església de Sant Romà dels Vilars

- Location in Andorra
- Coordinates: 42°31′N 1°33′E
- Country: Andorra
- Parish: Escaldes-Engordany

Population (2005)
  - Total: 1,354

Els Vilars d'Engordany (Catalan pronunciation: [əlz βiˈlaz ðəŋɡuɾˈðaɲ]), or simply Els Vilars, is a village in Andorra, located in the parish of Escaldes-Engordany. It is part of the contiguous urban area of Escaldes-Engordany and Andorra La Vella, and has panoramic views over the capital and the Gran Valira river valley. Església de Sant Romà dels Vilars is located here.
