= Església de Sant Romà dels Vilars =

Church in Escaldes-Engordany, Andorra

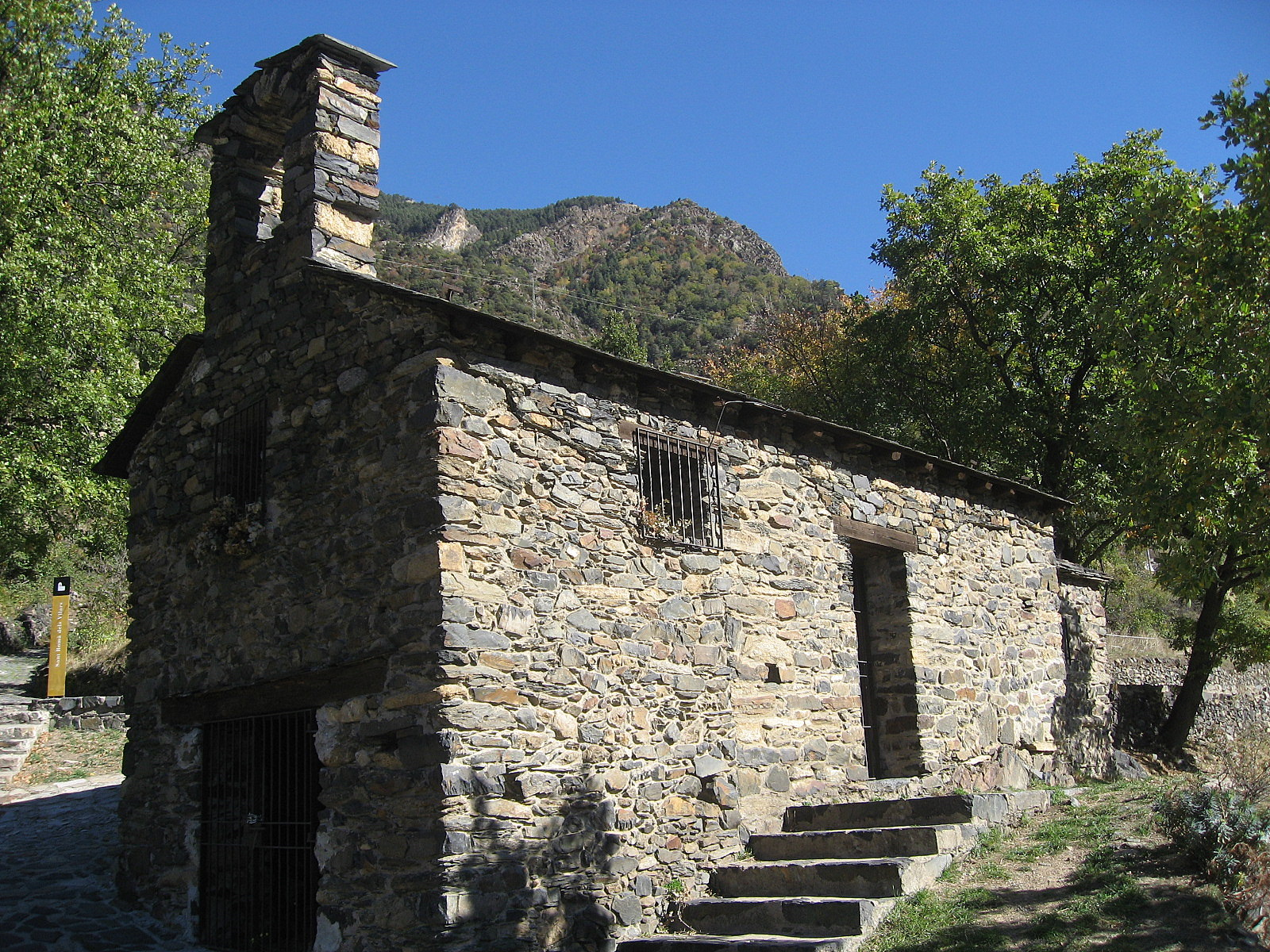
- Església de Sant Romà dels Vilars
- 42°30′53″N 1°32′05″E
- Location: Els Vilars, Escaldes-Engordany, Andorra
- Country: Andorra
- Denomination: Catholic Church
- Sui iuris church: Latin Church

Architecture
- Architectural type: Pre-Romanesque architecture

Església de Sant Romà dels Vilars is a church located in Els Vilars, Escaldes-Engordany, Andorra. Constructed in the 10th century using pre-Romanesque architecture, the church is noted for its austere design and is one of the oldest churches in Andorra. Cèsar Martinell i Brunet conducted a restoration of the church in the 1950s.

== History ==
Located in Els Vilars, Escaldes-Engordany, Andorra, the church of Sant Romà dels Vilars is one of the oldest churches in the country and is believed to have been constructed in the 10th century. It stands at an altitude of 1,861 metres. In 1957, Cèsar Martinell i Brunet was hired to conduct a restoration of Sant Romà dels Vilars and three other churches.

== Structure ==
Pre-Romanesque architecture was used for Sant Romà dels Vilars. The Gran Enciclopèdia Catalana notes the building's austere design, lack of major details, bare walls, and simple construction. The nave is small and rectangular and has an apse on its eastern side. Sant Romà dels Vilars' design is similar to Sant Vicenç d'Enclar and Santa Coloma, but it does not have a triumphal arch.

The nave is 9 m x 4.63 m in width and its walls are 64 cm thick. Llicorella and limestone held together by lime mortar were used to construct the building. The original door of the church was replaced by one that is 0.96 m x 2.20 m in size. In 2022, €8,254.44 were allocated for maintenance work on the slate roofing of thirteen churches, including Sant Romà dels Vilars.

== Works cited ==
- "La Casa d'Areny-Plandolit s'afegeix a la col·lecció de maquetes del CAEE". Bondia. 1 February 2012. Archived from the original on 16 June 2025.
- "Martinell i els eterns entorns". Bondia. 9 February 2024. Archived from the original on 30 April 2025.
- "Patrimoni Cultural adjudica el cobriment de pissarra de tretze esglésies". Ara. 9 July 2022. Archived from the original on 16 June 2025.
- "Sant Romà dels Vilars (Escaldes-Engordany)". Gran Enciclopèdia Catalana. Archived from the original on 16 June 2025.
