= Ludmilla Lacueva Canut =

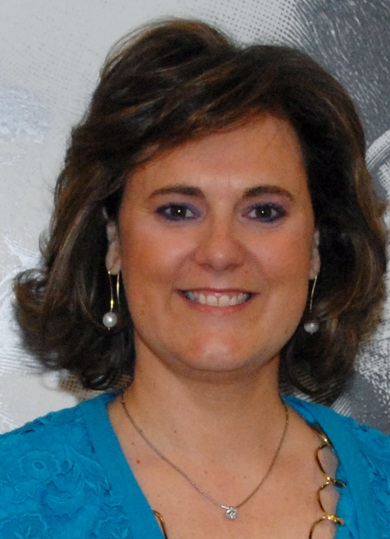
- Ludmilla Lacueva Canut
- Born: July 28, 1971 (age 55); Escaldes-Engordany, Andorra
- Occupation: Writer
- Writing career
- Language: Catalan

Ludmilla Lacueva Canut (born 28 July 1971) is an Andorran writer of both fiction and non-fiction works, as well as an opinion columnist for the newspaper Bondia.

== Career ==
Ludmilla Lacueva Canut was originally trained in the hospitality industry, and liked to collect anecdotes about former hotels in Andorra. Her first published work was Los pioneros de la hoteleria andorrana, a history of the hotel industry of Andorra. She was awarded the Research Prize by the General Council of Andorra for her work on the book. When it was published in 2001, it became the best selling book in the run up to Saint George's Day, where it is tradition for women to give men a book. Although that was a non-fiction work, she has since moved into fiction while continuing to write opinion pieces for newspaper Bondia.

Her second novel, L’home de mirada clara, explored the isolationism and then development of late 19th century Andorra through the eyes of Charles Romeu. Lacueva Canut has also worked with the Andorran Ministry of Education and collaborated on the non-fiction books Andorra, nova aproximació a la història d’Andorra and Papers de recerca històrica. She routinely produces limited edition runs of Christmas stories, which are intended to be fiction but contain some non-fiction elements. Her works are kept in the Andorran National Library. She has placed twice in the Andorran National Literary Contest; in 2011 she was a finalist with Cursa d’esquí amb el bus exprés, and in 2012 she came second with El Bus de la memòria.
