= El Fener =

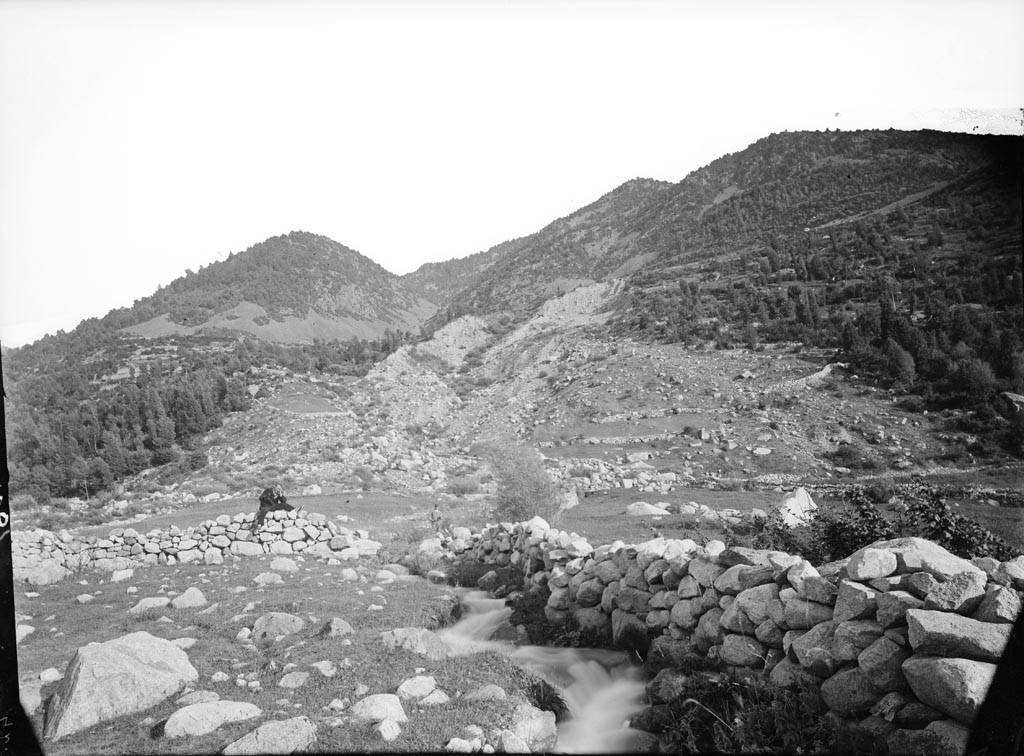
- 1890

- Location in Andorra
- Coordinates: 42°30′10″N 1°31′50″E
- Country: Andorra
- Parish: Escaldes-Engordany

El Fener (Catalan pronunciation: [əl fəˈne]) was a place in the parish of Escaldes-Engordany, Andorra. A landslide from the neighboring mountain destroyed it in 1865.
