= Les Escaldes =

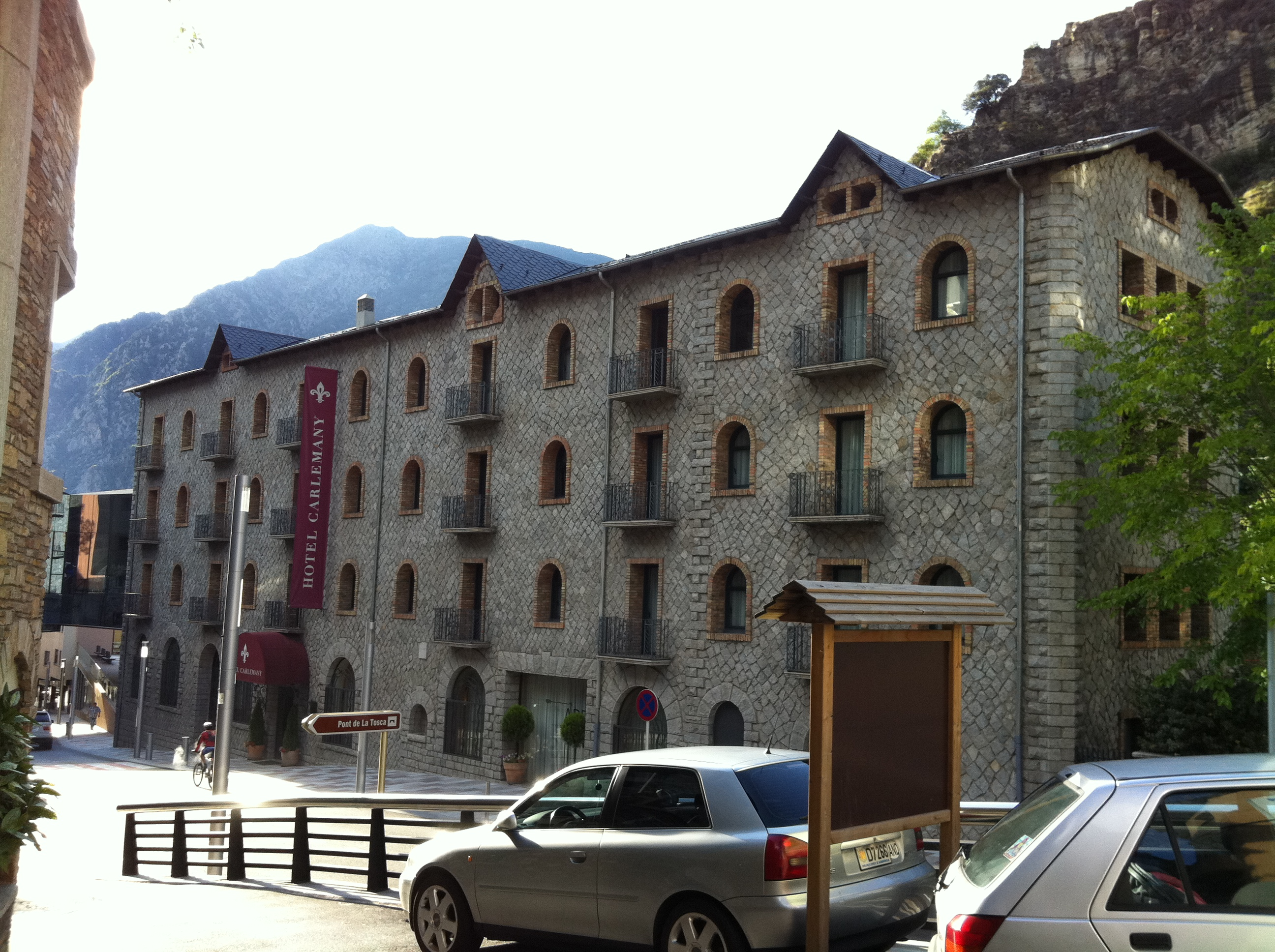
- Avinguda Charlemany in Les Escaldes

- Location in Andorra
- Coordinates: 42°30′N 1°32′E
- Country: Andorra
- Parish: Escaldes-Engordany
- Elevation: 1,053 m (3,455 ft)

Les Escaldes (Catalan pronunciation: [lez esˈkaldes]) or Escaldes is an urban area in Escaldes-Engordany parish, Andorra. It is located near the nation's capital, Andorra la Vella.

== Overview ==
Caldea thermal spa and wellness resort

The name Les Escaldes comes from the presence of numerous hot springs, which produce highly sulphurous and nitrogenous waters at temperatures between 22 and 66 °C (72 and 151 °F). The hot springs were known by the Romans who used them for medical purposes.

There was a textile industry from the Middle Ages, producing woven fabrics and umbrellas in several guilds. The area is also known for its traditional dance, the Santa Anna.

In the 1800s some proposed establishing baths to take advantage of the natural hot springs, but there was resistance from the government of Les Escaldes, possibly for fear that visitors to the hot springs would bring diseases to Andorra.

Nowadays Les Escaldes is home to the spa resort Caldea.

== Education ==
The Spanish international primary school Escuela Española de Escaldes serves the community.

== Climate ==
Climate data for Les Escaldes
Month	Jan	Feb	Mar	Apr	May	Jun	Jul	Aug	Sep	Oct	Nov	Dec	Year
Record high °C (°F)	15 (59)	17 (63)	20 (68)	25 (77)	29 (84)	36 (97)	35 (95)	33 (91)	31 (88)	27 (81)	20 (68)	13 (55)	36 (97)
Mean daily maximum °C (°F)	6 (43)	7 (45)	12 (54)	14 (57)	17 (63)	23 (73)	26 (79)	24 (75)	22 (72)	16 (61)	10 (50)	6 (43)	15.3 (59.5)
Mean daily minimum °C (°F)	−1 (30)	−1 (30)	2 (36)	4 (39)	6 (43)	10 (50)	12 (54)	12 (54)	10 (50)	6 (43)	2 (36)	−1 (30)	5.1 (41.2)
Record low °C (°F)	−13 (9)	−18 (0)	−9 (16)	−4 (25)	0 (32)	2 (36)	5 (41)	4 (39)	2 (36)	−5 (23)	−5 (23)	−11 (12)	−18 (0)
Average precipitation mm (inches)	34 (1.3)	37 (1.5)	46 (1.8)	63 (2.5)	105 (4.1)	69 (2.7)	65 (2.6)	98 (3.9)	81 (3.2)	73 (2.9)	68 (2.7)	69 (2.7)	808 (31.8)
Source: BBC Weather
