= Escaldes–Engordany =

Parish in southern Andorra

- view of Escaldes

- Flag Coat of arms

- Location of Escaldes–Engordany within Andorra
- Coordinates (Escaldes town): 42°30′32″N 1°32′27″E
- Country: Andorra
- Parishes: Escaldes–Engordany
- Villages: Escaldes, Engordany, El Fener, Els Vilars d'Engordany, Engolasters

Government
  - Mayor: Rosa Gili Casals (Independent)

Area
  - Total: 30 km^{2} (12 sq mi)
- Elevation: 1,050 m (3,440 ft)

Population (2005)
  - Total: 14,395
  - Density: 479.83/km^{2} (1,242.8/sq mi)
- Demonym(s): escaldenc, escaldenca
- Postal code: AD700
- Website: Official site

Escaldes–Engordany (Catalan pronunciation: [esˈkaldez aŋɡoɾˈðaɲ]) is one of the seven parishes of Andorra. The Escaldes–Engordany parish was founded in 1978 by being separated from Andorra la Vella. The parish is composed of the areas les Escaldes, Engordany, Els Vilars d'Engordany, Engolasters, and El Fener. As of 2014 it has a population of 13,634, the second largest population after Andorra la Vella. Notable events include the 8 May feast of Sant Miquel d'Engolasters which the people decided to make a local holiday starting in 2025.

It borders four parishes: Encamp to the north and northeast, Sant Julià de Lòria in the southwest, Andorra la Vella in the west, and La Massana in the northwest. Escaldes–Engordany also borders Spain in the east, south and southeast.

The town grew up around hot springs that rise where the Madriu river meets the Valira d'Orient. The springs supported a wool-working trade organised as a guild from 1604, bathing establishments from the mid-19th century, a communal hot-water network in the 20th century and, since 1994, the Caldea thermal leisure complex. Part of the Madriu-Perafita-Claror Valley, a cultural landscape inscribed on the UNESCO World Heritage List in 2004, lies within the parish.

== Etymology ==
The name Escaldes comes from the hot springs (Latin calidae) beside which the settlement arose. Places that grew up around thermal springs in the Pyrenees and Catalonia often bear names of this caldes type. A confraternity account book begun in 1660 still refers to the place as les Caldes, in the parish of Andorra la Vella.

== Geography ==
The main settlement stands at about 1,050 m (3,440 ft) above sea level. The Valira del Nord, which rises at the Tristaina lakes and crosses the parishes of Ordino and La Massana, joins the Valira d'Orient in the parish, just below the Pont dels Escalls, to form the Gran Valira, which flows south to the Segre. The Madriu meets the Valira d'Orient at Les Escaldes, and the thermal springs emerge around this confluence. Les Escaldes occupies a narrow, gorge-like stretch of the valley on its shaded side (obaga). The hot water encouraged settlement on a site that would otherwise have been considered unsuitable for building before heating began to be installed in houses in the mid-20th century. The three valleys were shaped by Quaternary glaciers: the Madriu, Valira d'Orient and Valira del Nord glaciers converged at Les Escaldes into a single tongue of ice that extended down the Gran Valira valley as far as the vicinity of Sant Julià de Lòria.

Besides Les Escaldes and Engordany, the parish includes the old hamlets of Els Vilars, El Fener and Engolasters, which in the Middle Ages were small farming and herding communities. To the north-west the Pont Pla marks the limit with La Massana. The parish's communal land extends into the Madriu valley. Under the agreement of 1988 that settled the division of communal land with Andorra la Vella, part of that valley, lying between the land administered solely by Escaldes–Engordany, the boundary with Encamp and the Spanish border, was left undivided under the joint administration of the two parishes.

=== Climate ===
Escaldes–Engordany has an oceanic climate (Köppen climate classification Cfb). The average annual temperature in Escaldes–Engordany is 8.5 °C (47.3 °F). The average annual rainfall is 799.9 mm (31.49 in) with May as the wettest month. The temperatures are highest on average in July, at around 17.3 °C (63.1 °F), and lowest in January, at around 1.9 °C (35.4 °F). The highest temperature ever recorded in Escaldes-Engordany was 33.0 °C (91.4 °F) on 16 August 1974; the coldest temperature ever recorded was −21.0 °C (−5.8 °F) on 30 January 1935.

Climate data for Escaldes–Engordany (1981–2010 averages, extremes 1934−2017)
Month	Jan	Feb	Mar	Apr	May	Jun	Jul	Aug	Sep	Oct	Nov	Dec	Year
Record high °C (°F)	20.0 (68.0)	18.0 (64.4)	23.0 (73.4)	29.0 (84.2)	29.0 (84.2)	31.0 (87.8)	32.0 (89.6)	33.0 (91.4)	30.0 (86.0)	25.0 (77.0)	23.0 (73.4)	21.0 (69.8)	33.0 (91.4)
Mean daily maximum °C (°F)	5.7 (42.3)	6.5 (43.7)	9.3 (48.7)	10.3 (50.5)	14.4 (57.9)	19.4 (66.9)	23.1 (73.6)	22.7 (72.9)	18.7 (65.7)	13.8 (56.8)	8.8 (47.8)	6.3 (43.3)	13.3 (55.9)
Daily mean °C (°F)	1.9 (35.4)	2.2 (36.0)	4.3 (39.7)	5.5 (41.9)	9.4 (48.9)	14.0 (57.2)	17.3 (63.1)	17.0 (62.6)	13.4 (56.1)	9.3 (48.7)	4.9 (40.8)	2.6 (36.7)	8.5 (47.3)
Mean daily minimum °C (°F)	−1.9 (28.6)	−2.2 (28.0)	−0.6 (30.9)	0.7 (33.3)	4.4 (39.9)	8.6 (47.5)	11.4 (52.5)	11.2 (52.2)	8.2 (46.8)	4.9 (40.8)	1.0 (33.8)	−1.1 (30.0)	3.8 (38.8)
Record low °C (°F)	−21.0 (−5.8)	−20.0 (−4.0)	−14.0 (6.8)	−11.0 (12.2)	−8.0 (17.6)	−2.0 (28.4)	1.0 (33.8)	−2.0 (28.4)	−4.0 (24.8)	−13.0 (8.6)	−13.0 (8.6)	−15.0 (5.0)	−21.0 (−5.8)
Average precipitation mm (inches)	51.8 (2.04)	30.6 (1.20)	38.8 (1.53)	71.3 (2.81)	90.9 (3.58)	81.3 (3.20)	59.8 (2.35)	79.2 (3.12)	82.1 (3.23)	79.4 (3.13)	73.3 (2.89)	61.4 (2.42)	799.9 (31.49)
Average precipitation days (≥ 1.0 mm)	6.5	5.5	6.6	9.8	11.6	8.9	6.7	7.6	6.9	8.0	7.2	7.0	92.3
Source: Météo France

=== Thermal springs ===
Pont de la Tosca

Several springs of hot, sulphurous water rise at Les Escaldes, to the north-east of the major fault that runs lengthwise along the plain of Andorra. Geochemically the waters resemble those of other geothermal systems in the Pyrenees and belong to the group of granite-related alkaline thermal waters: they have a high pH (8.95), low total dissolved solids, very little magnesium, and sodium as the dominant cation. Geothermometric modelling indicates that they are in equilibrium with the minerals of the reservoir rock at about 90 ± 10 °C.

Some of the springs are communal and others privately owned. Before 1985 the water collected from them amounted to about 500 cubic metres a day at an average temperature of 52 °C (126 °F). A survey ordered by the parish council in 1984 measured 30 private springs belonging to nine owners, whose combined flow of some 630,000 litres a day exceeded that of the communal springs. In 1985 an inclined borehole about 125 m (410 ft) deep, drilled beside the Pont de la Tosca to reach the intersection of two fault planes, the Madriu and Valira faults, produced an artesian flow at 70 °C (158 °F), put at about 2,000 cubic metres a day in technical accounts and at 2.5 million litres a day by the parish archivist.

Writing in 2010, Jordi Llovera described the Escaldes field as Andorra's principal geothermal resource; the country's geothermal production then amounted to about 2,000 tonnes of oil equivalent, some 20 per cent of the energy produced in the country but about 1 per cent of the energy it consumed. Medical studies cited by the same author recommend the water for bathing and for skin treatment, but not for drinking.

=== Madriu-Perafita-Claror Valley ===
Part of the parish lies within the Madriu-Perafita-Claror Valley, a glacial valley of 4,247 ha (42.47 km^{2}), about 9 per cent of Andorra's territory, which extends over parts of Encamp, Andorra la Vella, Sant Julià de Lòria and Escaldes–Engordany. Its main valley, carved by a glacier in the granite of south-eastern Andorra, runs from east to west; the glacier extended for about 12.5 km (7.8 mi) from the Port de Vall Civera, at 2,517 m (8,258 ft), down to El Noguer, at 1,250 m (4,100 ft), where it met the ice of the Valira d'Orient. A path along the valley floor links Les Escaldes with the pass. The valley was inscribed on the World Heritage List in 2004 under criterion (v), with a minor boundary modification in 2006, as a cultural landscape illustrating how the inhabitants of the high Pyrenees have exploited scarce mountain resources, and as the reflection of a system of communal land management that has survived for more than 700 years. UNESCO describes it as the last place in the country without roads; it preserves shepherds' huts, summer settlements, terraced fields, paved tracks and the remains of iron working.

Archaeological and palaeoenvironmental research carried out after the inscription, in the headwaters of the valley within Escaldes–Engordany and Encamp, located more than 400 archaeological structures, of which 55 were excavated, and traced human use of the high pastures from the Mesolithic to the 20th century. According to this work, the cultural landscape first took shape in the Neolithic, when grazing pressure increased and fire began to be used to open pastures, and activities diversified in the Roman period to include pine-resin extraction, charcoal production and pastoralism.

== History ==
=== Early settlement and the Middle Ages ===
According to the parish council, Engordany is the older of the two urban nuclei and was already inhabited around the 2nd or 1st century BC. The parish archivist Montserrat Bota places the first settlement at Les Escaldes in the Roman period, on the shaded bank where the hot water could be used, in the district still known as el Barri.

An archaeological report prepared for the Andorran government notes that between the 11th and 16th centuries Andorra was divided into three large districts (partides), Andorra la Vella, Santa Coloma and Enclar, and that new ones, among them Escaldes and Engordany, appear from the 17th and 18th centuries. Small farming and herding communities existed at Engordany, Els Vilars, El Fener and Engolasters. The pre-Romanesque church of Sant Romà dels Vilars has been dated to the 10th century and the bell tower of the Romanesque church of Sant Miquel d'Engolasters to the 12th. The Pont dels Escalls is mentioned in a document of 27 January 1434, and the Pont d'Engordany in another document of the 15th century.

=== Wool working ===
Wool dressers (paraires) used the thermal water to wash and dye wool, and a rudimentary woollen industry became concentrated at Les Escaldes. In 1604 the trade was organised as a guild of the wool dressers and weavers of the Valleys of Andorra, whose statutes were approved by the Bishop of Urgell. Its confraternity, dedicated to Saint Peter Martyr and Saint Ivo and based in the chapel of Sant Pere Màrtir, passed under the control of the General Council in the 18th century. Francisco de Zamora, who visited in September 1788, described Les Escaldes as a village of weavers and fulling mills and one of the richest in the valley. A century later the travellers Félix Régnault and Gaston Vuillier reported that the mills, which made coarse woollen cloth, had been badly hit by cheap imported fabrics.

=== Bathing establishments ===
Travellers of the late 18th and the 19th centuries also remarked on the sulphurous springs. Some of them, such as a cleric of Anyós writing in 1838 and L. Boucoiran in 1854, regretted that the waters were not exploited for bathing. The first bathhouse, equipped with rough wooden tubs, opened in the middle of the 19th century. Marble baths were later installed at Francisco Pla's spa hotel on the square of Les Escaldes (now the Plaça Santa Anna), and other families opened establishments such as the Hotel Muntanya, the Hotel Paulet, the Fonda Roca and the Hostal Valira, which led the quart to draw up rules for concessions of hot water. The women of Les Escaldes, meanwhile, washed clothes in a communal hot-water wash-house beside the Valira, which remained in use until the 1970s.

In 1881 an agreement known as the Treaty of the Pont dels Escalls was signed in a Gothic tower, no longer standing, beside the bridge. It ended an armed revolt of 8 and 9 June 1881 by Andorrans who the previous year had entered the Casa de la Vall by force and unilaterally set up a revolutionary council.

=== Roads, hydroelectricity and the Montserrat concession ===
In 1909 the partners of Tabacalera Andorrana agreed to build a small hydroelectric installation at the Roc de les Anelletes in Escaldes to supply lighting to Andorra la Vella, Escaldes, Encamp and Canillo. On 27 March 1929 the General Council granted a 75-year concession for three hydroelectric falls, which passed in 1930 to the newly formed company Forces Hidroelèctriques d'Andorra (FHASA). In return the concessionaires undertook to build roads, and those from Andorra la Vella to the Pas de la Casa and to Ordino opened in 1933 and 1934. The "Escaldes fall" (salt d'Escaldes), which uses the waters of the Valira d'Orient and the Madriu and was the only one of the three falls to be built, came into service on 4 August 1934. The power station, begun in 1931 and completed in 1934, was given the name of Escaldes by its engineers although it stands in the territory of the parish of Encamp; it is fed through a penstock from the Engolasters reservoir, to which water from the Madriu has been led by tunnel since 1944. Its construction, directed by Swiss and German engineers, is credited with spreading in Andorra the so-called granite architecture (arquitectura de granit), a current characterised by façades faced with dressed granite that lasted from the early 1930s to the late 1960s. The parish council regards the road building and the FHASA concession of the 1930s as the turning point in local history: Engordany kept its agricultural and pastoral character and later became mainly residential, while Les Escaldes turned to tourism and commerce.

In the early 20th century the quart reached agreements with the Benedictine monks of Montserrat. The Societat Cultural Andorrana, founded by the monks, was authorised to prospect for and extract hot water in return for building a spa hotel, the Hostal Valira, and founding a school. The hotel was inaugurated in 1933. The exploitation and distribution of the hot water gave rise to disputes over the ownership of the springs that lasted for decades, including litigation between the quart and the General Council over the concession to the Societat Cultural Andorrana, on which the co-princes' permanent delegations issued a decree in November 1935.

A decree of the General Council of 12 June 1935 granted the quart of Escaldes–Engordany administrative autonomy, giving it greater independence in regulating urban development, collecting taxes and creating public services. As spa hotels multiplied in the mid-20th century the local economy shifted towards services, and from about the 1950s the quart laid pipes to distribute thermal water to homes for heating and domestic hot water. Between 1960 and 1980 the combined population of Andorra la Vella and Escaldes–Engordany rose from 4,777 to 23,671.

=== Creation of the parish ===
Until 1978 Escaldes–Engordany was one of the two quarts, the traditional subdivisions of an Andorran parish, into which the parish of Andorra was divided, the other being Andorra la Vella. From the 1950s its demands centred on political representation: in 1953 the quart formally protested that it had one member of the General Council against three for Andorra la Vella. In 1968 the co-princes' permanent delegations decreed that the parish's councillors should increase from four to eight, but the other councillors rejected the decree and an Assemblea Magna declared it invalid. In 1977 the councillors of the parish of Andorra repeatedly absented themselves from the General Council in protest. The tension eased when the co-princes opened a process of institutional reform, in which the General Council was required to propose a solution to the problem of the parish's representation. After public consultations in 1977 and 1978, and a proposal by the quart for the creation of a seventh parish, the permanent delegations promulgated Decree 78-9 of 14 June 1978, which gave legal existence to the parish of Escaldes–Engordany.

Article 5 of the decree fixed the boundary in the urban area according to an existing agreement between the two quarts and gave the two parishes six months to agree on the division, or joint ownership, of their communal lands. The question took ten years to settle, partly because of a dispute more than four centuries old over high-mountain land between the former parish of Andorra and Sant Julià de Lòria. A preliminary accord of 4 May 1987 provided for the three parishes jointly to develop a ski area, and on 14 June 1988, ten years to the day after the creation of the parish, the councils of Andorra la Vella and Escaldes–Engordany signed an agreement at the Casa de la Vall that delimited the land each would administer and left part of the Madriu valley undivided. The Constitution of 1993 names Escaldes–Engordany last among the seven parishes of which Andorra is composed.

=== Since 1978 ===
In the early 1980s the new parish council drew up a study of the capture and distribution of the thermal water, both as a source of energy and as the basis for thermal tourism. Regulations on its use and supply came into force in 1986, and the borehole drilled between 24 May and 2 June 1985 was followed by the construction of a main pumping station in the former wash-house and of substations supplying several districts of the town. On 2 December 1986 the council defined the project for a thermal leisure centre to be run by a mixed public–private company. The architect Jean-Michel Ruols presented a model in May 1987, and the centre, Caldea, was inaugurated on 14 March 1994; it takes most of the water produced by the borehole.

In 2021 the council launched the "Caldes" project to remodel the old core of Les Escaldes, including the Plaça del Madriu, the Roc del Metge, the riverside walk and the Pont d'Engordany, with water as its guiding theme. The design competition was won by a team led by Javier Balmaseda. On 21 October 2026 the general assembly of the European Historic Thermal Towns Association, meeting in Loutraki, Greece, admitted Escaldes–Engordany as a member.

== Government and politics ==
Like the other parishes, Escaldes–Engordany is governed by a comú. Under the Constitution the comuns are public corporations that represent and administer the parishes, with powers that include the population census, local planning and communal public services. The council is presided over by a cònsol major and a cònsol menor. Like each of the seven parishes, it elects two members of the 28-seat General Council by a majoritarian party block vote; the other 14 members are elected by proportional representation in a single national constituency.

In the communal election of 17 December 2023 the list Consens per Escaldes-Engordany, which united the Social Democratic Party, Concòrdia and independents under the incumbent cònsol major Rosa Gili, won 1,606 votes (51.49 per cent) and nine of the twelve council seats. A joint list of Democrats for Andorra, Acció, Progressistes-SDP and independents, headed by the independent Anna Garcia, won 1,513 votes (48.51 per cent) and three seats. Turnout was 56.9 per cent. Gili, who has been cònsol major since January 2020, had won the previous election by ten votes; Quim Dolsa is cònsol menor.

=== Urban planning ===
High-rise construction has been a contentious issue in the parish. Its urban development plan (POUP), last revised in 2018, permits towers in the Clot d'Emprivat district, where buildings of about twenty storeys have multiplied. In January 2024 the council temporarily suspended the granting of new building licences until a new plan is approved; according to Gili, the new plan will limit new buildings to five storeys and will create no further zones for towers. Projects submitted before the suspension have nevertheless proceeded. On 1 December 2025 the park and car park on the Avinguda de les Nacions Unides, which stood on private land leased by the council, closed permanently to make way for three privately developed towers that comply with the 2018 plan as modified in 2023. Gili then asked the national government and the General Council to form a joint commission with the council on the future of the district, arguing that the question affected the whole country. The head of government, Xavier Espot, declined in February 2026, replying that urban planning is the exclusive competence of the comuns and that the council could amend its own plan.

== Demographics ==
The Department of Statistics estimated the resident population at 16,206 on 31 March 2026, which was 18.1 per cent of Andorra's 89,368 inhabitants and 380 more (2.4 per cent) than a year earlier. Only Andorra la Vella, with 24,806 residents, was more populous. Andorran nationals made up 45.5 per cent of the parish's residents (7,374), followed by Spanish (4,152; 25.6 per cent), Portuguese (1,396; 8.6 per cent) and French (609; 3.8 per cent) nationals and people of other nationalities (2,675; 16.5 per cent). People aged under 15 accounted for 10.8 per cent of the population, those aged 15 to 64 for 71.9 per cent and those aged 65 or over for 17.3 per cent.

== Economy and services ==
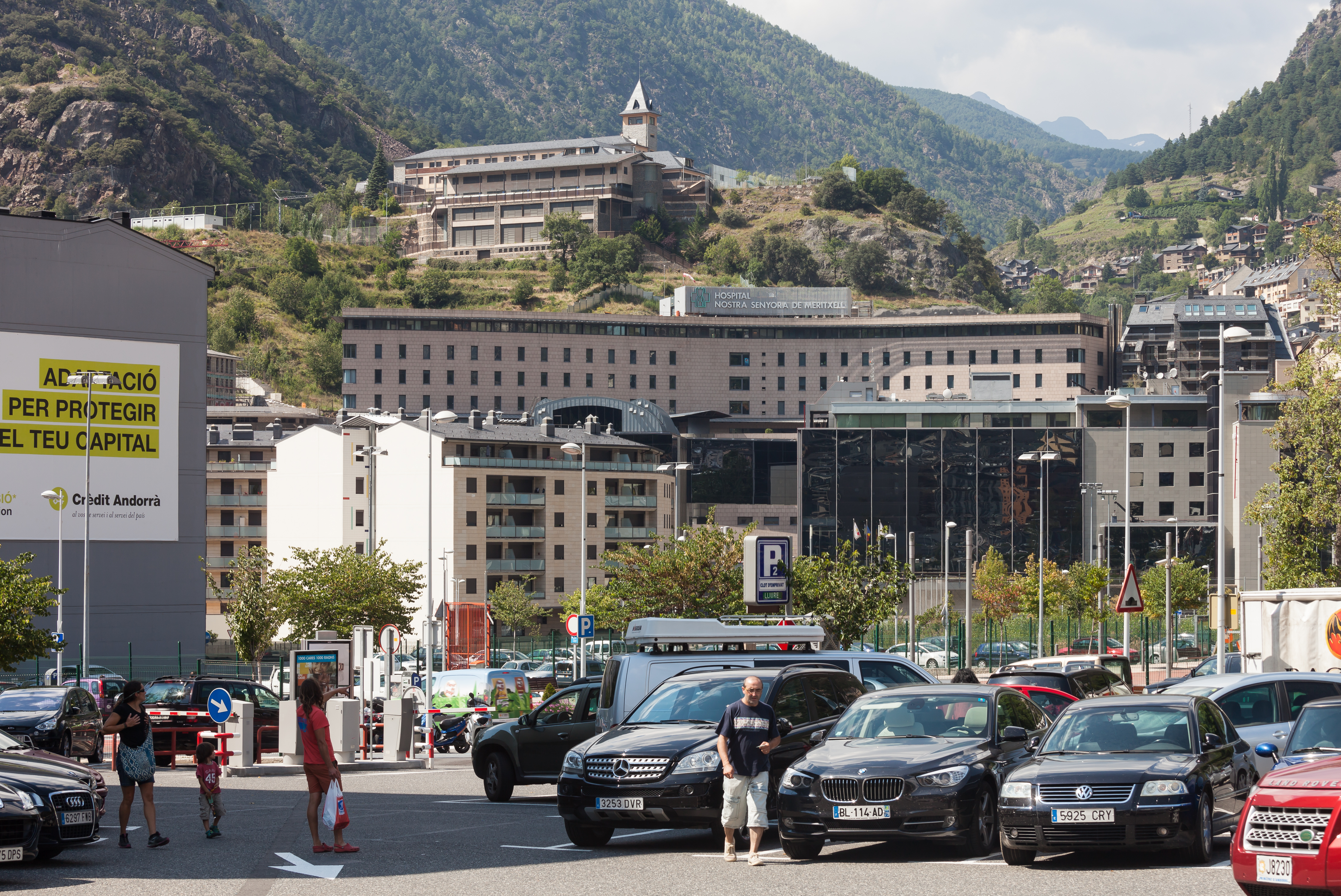
Nostra Senyora de Meritxell Hospital

Since the 1930s the economy of Les Escaldes has been oriented towards tourism, at first based on the thermal water and the spa hotels, and towards commerce. Caldea's operating company, Semtee, reported more than 420,000 admissions to the spa and a turnover of €25.3 million for 2025. Thermal water from the communal borehole is carried in insulated mains to Caldea, to a communal swimming pool and to homes in part of the town, where it is used for heating and domestic hot water.

The Hospital Nostra Senyora de Meritxell, run by the public health service Servei Andorrà d'Atenció Sanitària (SAAS) and opened in 1994, is located in the parish.

== Culture and heritage ==
=== Monuments ===
The Pont dels Escalls, a humpbacked stone bridge over the Valira del Nord on the old road from Andorra la Vella to Engordany, is protected as a property of cultural interest under Andorra's cultural heritage law of 2003. Excavations in 2023 and 2024 uncovered two earlier pavements of stone and lime mortar beneath the modern surface but could not establish when the bridge was built, and the bridge was restored in 2024. A 16th-century wayside cross that stood at its southern end is kept at the parish's historical archive. The Pont de la Tosca over the Madriu, whose keystone bears the date 1820, appears on the council's coat of arms together with a hot-water spout, a sprig of holly and an ear of wheat.

The apse of Sant Miquel d'Engolasters was decorated with wall paintings in the 12th century. Montserrat Pagès attributes them to the Master of Santa Coloma, a painter active in the valley of Andorra in the second half of that century, whereas the catalogue of the Museu Nacional d'Art de Catalunya (MNAC) assigns them to the master's circle and dates them to about 1160. The paintings were among the Romanesque murals bought, detached and transferred to Barcelona in the campaign conducted by the city's Junta de Museus between 1919 and 1923, and are now in the MNAC.

=== Museums and events ===
The Centre d'Art d'Escaldes-Engordany (CAEE) occupies a building erected between 1932 and 1934 on the initiative of the monks of Montserrat, which the national tourist board describes as an example of Andorran granite architecture; it housed a garage for the Hostal Valira and a school, and later became a cinema. It holds about fifty works by the Catalan sculptor Josep Viladomat, who died in Escaldes–Engordany in 1989, and a collection of models of Andorran Romanesque art.

The Museu Carmen Thyssen Andorra, which showed works from the collection of Carmen Thyssen-Bornemisza, opened in the former Hostal Valira in March 2017. Its ninth and last exhibition there closed on 4 January 2026. The museum is being relocated to the Node building, the new headquarters of Andorra Telecom in Andorra la Vella, and the council is to give up the Valira premises when its lease expires at the end of 2026.

The council organises the Festival Internacional de Jazz d'Andorra Escaldes-Engordany, held in July. The festival, revived in 2022 after several years in which it was not held, reached its 40th edition in 2024 and its 42nd in 2026, when it drew about 6,400 spectators.

== Sport ==
Escaldes–Engordany was the start of the tenth stage of the 2016 Tour de France, a 197 km (122 mi) stage to Revel won by Michael Matthews. In football, Inter Club d'Escaldes retained the Andorran league title in May 2026 with a 3–1 win over Atlètic Club d'Escaldes, qualifying for the preliminary round of the UEFA Champions League.

== Notable people ==
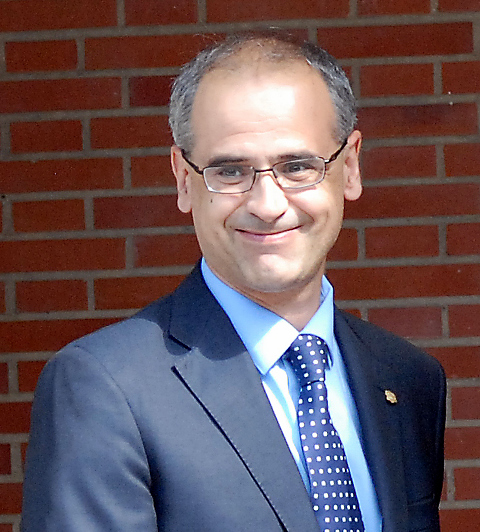
Antoni Martí, 2011

- Pilar Burgués Monserrat (born Escaldes 1958) short story writer
- Antoni Martí (1963–2023) architect and politician who was the Prime Minister of Andorra between May 2011 and May 2019.
- Xavier Espot Zamora (born 1979), judge and politician who has served as Prime Minister of Andorra and President of the Democrats for Andorra since May 2019
- Trinitat Marín González (born 1964), politician
- Ludmilla Lacueva Canut (born 1971) fiction and non-fiction writer

=== Sport ===
- brothers Emili Pérez (born 1966) & Xavier Pérez (born 1968) former cyclists, competed at the 1988 & 1992 Summer Olympics
- Xavier Capdevila Romero (born 1976 in Canillo) from Escaldes–Engordany ski mountaineer.
- Ariadna Tudel Cuberes (born 1978 in Escaldes–Engordany) road cyclist and ski mountaineer.
- David Albós (born 1984 in Escaldes–Engordany) professional road racing cyclist.
- Sergi Moreno (born 1987 in Escaldes–Engordany) footballer
- Marc Vales (born 1990 in Les Escaldes) footballer
- Claudia Guri (born 1995 in Escaldes) athlete and former basketball player
