= Caldea =

Resort in Escaldes-Engordany, Andorra

Coordinates: 42.5117°N 1.5368°E

Caldea is a spa resort in Escaldes-Engordany, Andorra.

Finished in 1994, it has 18 floors. At 6,000m² it is one of Europe's largest spas, and at 80 metres in height, it is Andorra's tallest building.
