= Nostra Senyora de Meritxell Hospital =

Hospital in Andorra

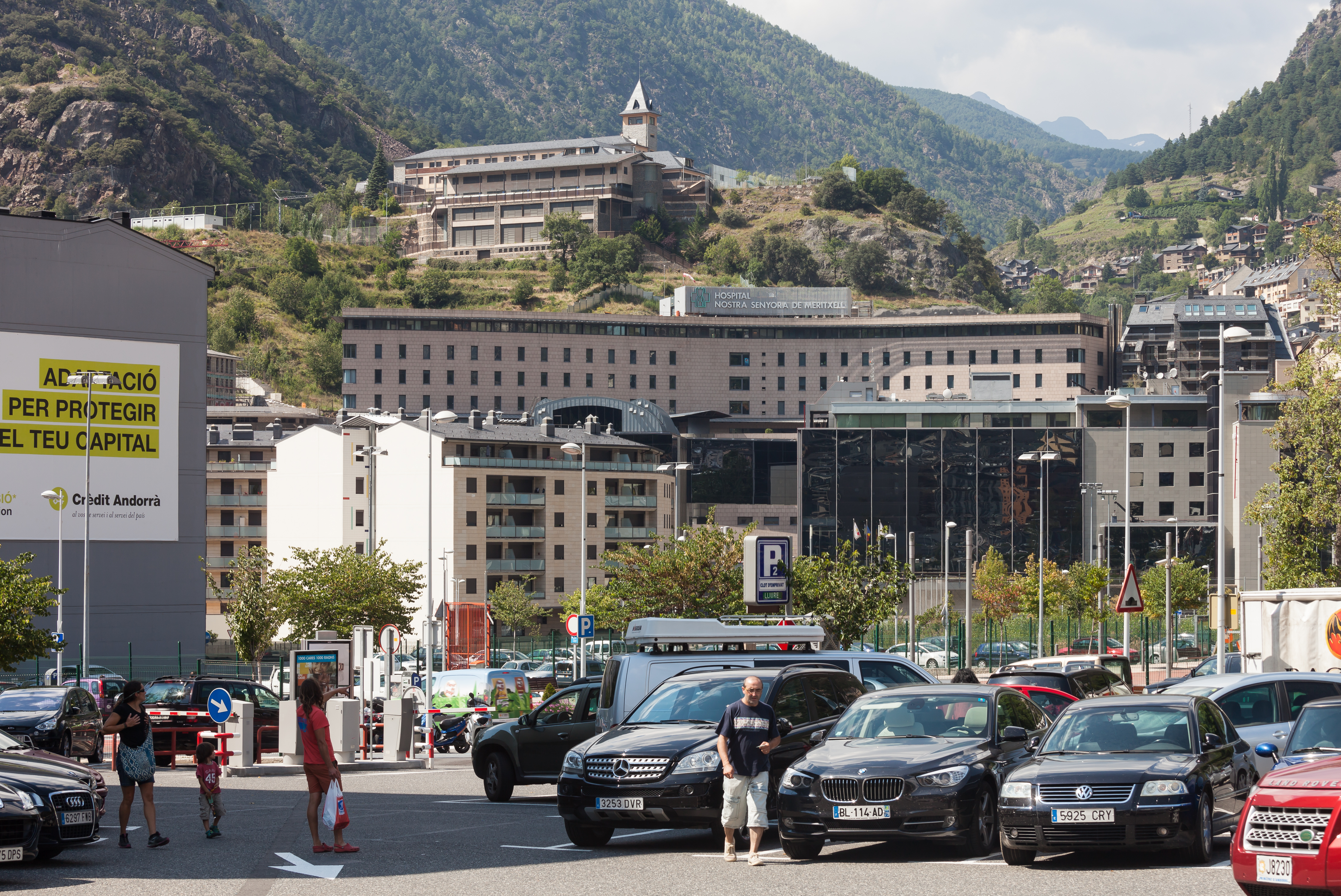
- Nostra Senyora de Meritxell Hospital

Geography
- Location: Carrer dels Escalls, AD700 Escaldes-Engordany, Andorra
- Coordinates: 42.511657°N 1.533566°E

History
- Opened: 1993

Links
- Lists: Hospitals in Andorra

Nostra Senyora de Meritxell Hospital (Catalan: Hospital Nostra Senyora de Meritxell) is the only hospital in Andorra. It is named after Our Lady of Meritxell the patron saint of Andorra.

== History ==
The hospital was built in 1993 on a very steep site of only 5,000 sqm in Escaldes-Engordany. It is constructed on 12 levels. The three lowest levels constitute a car park for 267 cars. The upper floors form an S-shaped linear block. There are 192 single bed rooms with bathrooms.

An artistic installation in the hospital square to commemorate the 70th anniversary of the Universal Declaration of Human Rights was opened by the Minister of Health, Carles Álvarez in December 2018.

A new radiotherapy unit is to be constructed in the car park on Avenida Fiter i Rossell, next to the hospital, and connected to it by a lift.

For specialist treatment patients may be sent to Barcelona or Toulouse by helicopter.
