= Servei Andorrà d'Atenció Sanitària =

The Servei Andorrà d'Atenció Sanitària is the Andorran Health Care Service. It was established in December 1986 and manages all the public health care facilities in the country. It co-ordinates the private, public and voluntary sectors.

The Sant Joan de Déu Terres de Lleida centre in Lleida, which has a high dependency unit, provides services for Andorran people with severe mental disorders.

The Social Democratic Party takes an interest in the employment policies of the organisation, and in November 2018 expressed concern that a number of senior positions had gone to candidates who did not live in the country.

In September 2018 the service moved to a referral system, where patients must register with a general practitioner who would decide whether to refer them to a specialist. Those who follow this integrated route are to be encouraged by a higher rate of reimbursement.

In September 2018 the service had a crisis in the dermatology service, as for various reasons none of the five dermatologists were taking on new patients.

A helicopter may be used for medical transfers and also for rescue services. A charge will be made for rescue services for people who were carrying out risky recreational activities or who have neglected warnings of dangerous conditions.
